= Patti LaBelle discography =

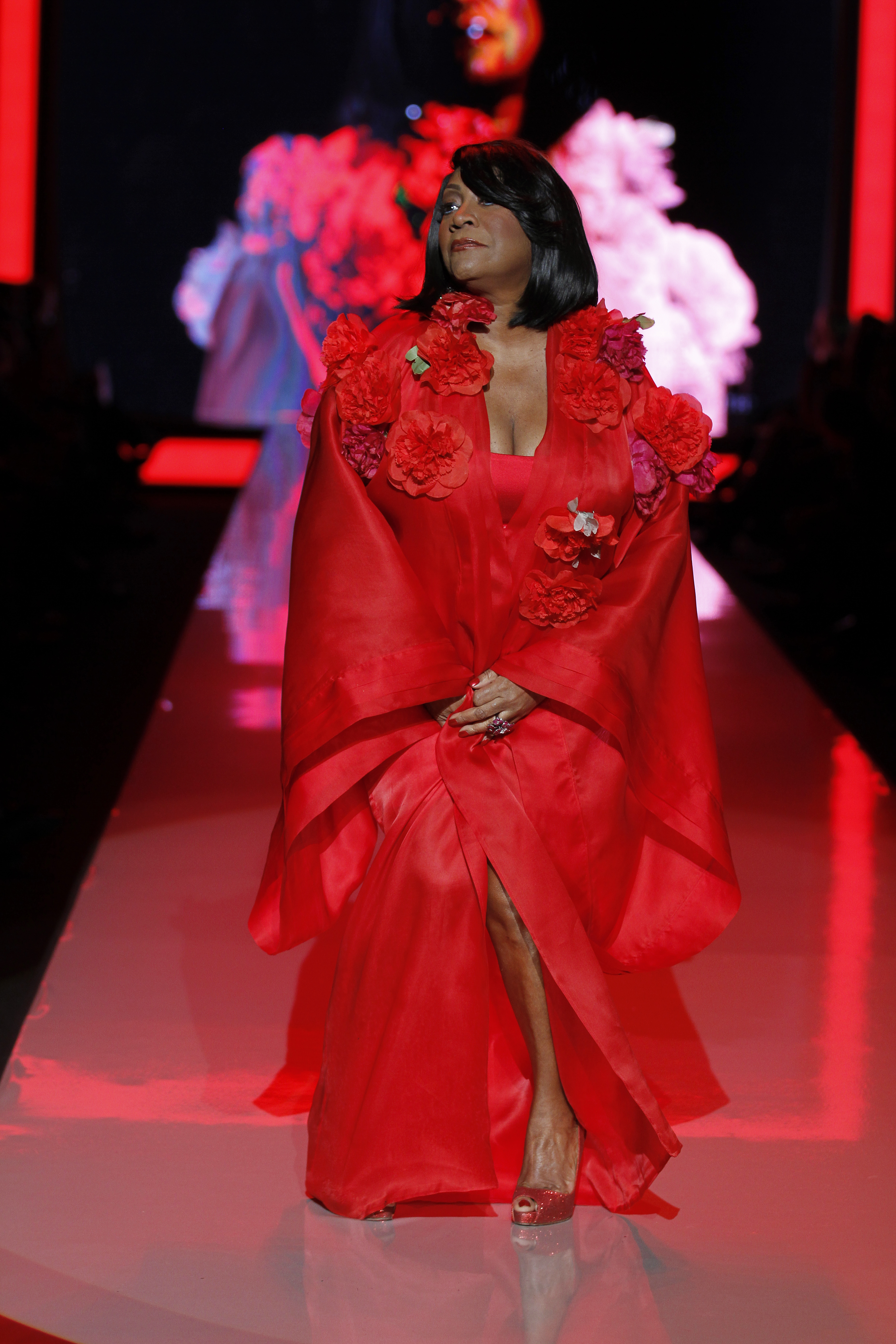
- LaBelle in 2011
- Studio albums: 18
- Live albums: 3
- Compilation albums: 8
- Singles: 47

American R&B singer Patti LaBelle has released eighteen studio albums, three live albums, fourteen compilation albums, and forty-seven singles. To date, LaBelle has sold 50 million records worldwide. According to RIAA, she has attained five gold and two platinum-certified albums in the United States. LaBelle has also charted forty-two hits on Billboard's Hot/R&B Hip-Hop Songs, 13 of which reached the Top 10.

In 2015, Billboard ranked “Lady Marmalade” with the all-female group LaBelle as the 30th Biggest Girl Group song of all time on Billboard Hot 100. She has charted twenty albums on Billboard 200, two of which reached the Top 10 and one reaching the top. Winner In You is her most successful album to date with eight million copies sold worldwide, and about 900,000 copies were sold in the US in just seven weeks.

== Albums ==
=== Studio albums ===
List of albums, with selected chart positions
Title	Album details	Peak chart positions										Certifications
Title	Album details	US	US R&B	US Cashbox R&B	US Gospel	US Jazz	AUS	CAN	NL	NZ	UK	Certifications
Patti LaBelle	Released: October 13, 1977; Label: Epic; Format: LP	62	31	5	—	—	—	—	—	—	—	
Tasty	Released: October 23, 1978; Label: Epic; Format: LP/CD	129	39	34	—	—	—	—	—	—	—	
It's Alright with Me	Released: November 12, 1979; Label: Epic; Format: CD	145	33	23	—	—	—	—	—	—	—	
Released	Released: November 24, 1980; Label: Epic; Format: LP/CD	114	21	31	—	—	—	—	—	—	—	
The Spirit's in It	Released: November 30, 1981; Label: Philadelphia Int'l / CBS; Format: CD	156	43	36	—	—	—	—	—	—	—	
I'm in Love Again	Released: November 21, 1983; Label: Philadelphia Int'l / CBS; Format: CD	40	4	3	—	—	—	—	—	—	—	RIAA: Gold
Patti	Released: July 11, 1985; Label: Philadelphia Int'l / CBS; Format: CD	72	13	7	—	—	—	—	—	—	—	
Winner in You	Released: April 28, 1986; Label: MCA; Format: CD, CS	1	1	1	—	—	72	7	28	10	30	RIAA: Platinum; MC: Platinum
Be Yourself	Released: June 22, 1989; Label: MCA; Format: CD, CS	86	14	14	—	—	—	—	—	—	—	
This Christmas	Released: October 30, 1990; Label: MCA; Format: CD, CS	—	—	—	—	—	—	—	—	—	—	
Burnin'	Released: October 1, 1991; Label: MCA; Format: CD, CS	71	9	11	—	—	184	—	—	—	—	RIAA: Gold
Gems	Released: June 7, 1994; Label: MCA; Format: CD, CS	48	7	5	—	—	136	—	—	—	—	RIAA: Gold
Flame	Released: June 24, 1997; Label: MCA; Format: CD, CS	39	10	n/a	—	—	192	—	—	—	—	RIAA: Platinum
When a Woman Loves	Released: October 24, 2000; Label: MCA; Format: CD, CS	63	26	n/a	—	—	—	—	—	—	—	
Timeless Journey	Released: May 4, 2004; Label: Def Soul Classics; Format: CD	18	5	n/a	—	—	—	—	—	—	—	RIAA: Gold
Classic Moments	Released: June 21, 2005; Label: Def Soul Classics; Format: CD	24	5	n/a	—	—	—	—	—	—	—	RIAA: Gold
The Gospel According to Patti LaBelle	Released: November 21, 2006; Label: Umbrella / Bungalo; Format: CD	86	17	n/a	1	—	—	—	—	—	—	
Miss Patti's Christmas	Released: October 9, 2007; Label: Def Soul Classics; Format: CD	174	26	n/a	—	—	—	—	—	—	—	
Bel Hommage	Released: May 5, 2017; Label: GPE Records; Format: CD, Digital Download	—	—	n/a	—	2	—	—	—	—	—	
Patti Labelle Presents: Home for the Holidays with Friends	Released: November 24, 2017; Label: GPE Records; Format: CD, Download	—	—	n/a	—	—	—	—	—	—	—	
"—" denotes a recording that did not chart or was not released in that territory.

=== Live albums ===
List of albums, with selected chart positions
Title	Album details	Peak chart positions	
Title	Album details	US	US R&B
Live!	Released: November 10, 1992; Label: MCA; Format: CD, CS	135	18
Live! One Night Only	Released: September 22, 1998; Label: MCA; Format: CD, CS	182	51
Live in Washington, D.C.	Released: June 10, 2008; Label: Philadelphia International / Legacy; Format: CD	—	43
"—" denotes a recording that did not chart.

=== Compilation albums ===
Year	Album	Peaks		Record label
Year	Album	US R&B	AUS	Record label
1982	Best of Patti LaBelle	61	—	Epic
1993	Miss Soul	—	—	Sony Music
1995	Lady Marmalade: The Best of Patti & Labelle	—	—	Legacy/Epic
1995	La Belle	—	—	Sony Music
1996	Greatest Hits	58	168	MCA
1997	You Are My Friend: the Ballads	—	—	Legacy/Epic
1999	20th Century Masters - The Millennium Collection: The Best of Patti LaBelle	—	—	MCA
2001	Love Songs	—	—	Legacy/Epic
2001	Classic: The Universal Masters Collection	—	—	MCA
2002	Greatest Love Songs	—	—	Hip-O
2003	The Essential Collection	—	—	Spectrum Music
2004	Anthology	95	—	The Right Stuff
2005	Gold	—	—	Hip-O
2006	The Definitive Collection	36	—	Geffen
2006	Beautiful Ballads	—	—	Legacy/Epic
2008	The Essential Patti LaBelle	—	—	Sony BMG
2011	Playlist: The Very Best of Patti LaBelle	—	—	Legacy/Epic
2014	Icon	—	—	Geffen
"—" denotes a recording that did not chart.

== Singles ==
Year	Single	Peak chart positions											Certifications	Album
Year	Single	US	US R&B	US Dan	US Cashbox R&B	US A/C	AUS	CAN	IRE	NL	NZ	UK	Certifications	Album
1977	"Joy to Have Your Love"	—	31	—	24	—	—	—	—	—	—	—		Patti LaBelle
1978	"You Are My Friend"	—	61	—	48	—	—	—	—	—	—	—		Patti LaBelle
1978	"Dan Swit Me"	—	—	29	—	—	—	—	—	—	—	—		Patti LaBelle
1978	"Teach Me Tonight (Me Gusta Tu Baile)"	—	51	—	70	—	—	—	—	—	—	—		Tasty
1978	"Little Girls"	—	60	—	61	—	—	—	—	—	—	—		Tasty
1979	"It's Alright with Me"	—	34	—	19	—	—	—	—	—	—	—		It's Alright with Me
1979	"Music Is My Way of Life"	—	81	10	82	—	—	—	—	—	—	—		It's Alright with Me
1980	"Release (The Tension)"	—	61	48	53	—	—	—	—	12	—	—		Released
1980	"I Don't Go Shopping"	—	26	—	22	—	—	—	—	—	—	—		Released
1980	"Don't Make Your Angel Cry"	—	—	—	—	—	—	—	—	—	—	—		Released
1981	"Rocking Pneumonia and the Boogie Woogie Flu"	—	—	—	—	—	—	—	—	—	—	—		The Spirit's in It
1981	"The Spirit's in It"	—	—	49	—	—	—	—	—	—	—	—		The Spirit's in It
1982	"The Best Is Yet to Come" (with Grover Washington, Jr.)	—	14	—	14	—	—	—	—	—	—	—		The Best Is Yet to Come
1983	"If Only You Knew" (A-side)	46	1	—	1	—	—	—	—	—	—	118		I'm in Love Again
1983	"I'll Never, Never Give Up" (B-side)	—	—	57	—	—	—	—	—	—	—	—		I'm in Love Again
1984	"Love Has Finally Come at Last" (with Bobby Womack)	88	3	—	1	—	—	—	—	—	—	—		The Poet II
1984	"Love, Need and Want You"	—	10	—	6	—	—	—	—	—	—	—		I'm in Love Again
1984	"It Takes a Lot of Strength to Say Goodbye" (with Bobby Womack)	—	76	—	—	—	—	—	—	—	—	—		The Poet II
1985	"New Attitude"	17	3	1	10	—	84	—	—	—	30	136		Beverly Hills Cop: Original Motion Picture Soundtrack
1985	"Stir It Up"	41	5	18	10	—	—	—	—	—	—	115		Beverly Hills Cop: Original Motion Picture Soundtrack
1985	"I Can't Forget You"	—	63	—	72	—	—	—	—	—	—	—		Patti
1985	"Shy"	—	—	—	—	—	—	—	—	—	—	—		Patti
1986	"If You Don't Know Me by Now (Part 1)"	—	79	—	—	—	—	—	—	—	—	—		Patti
1986	"On My Own" (with Michael McDonald)	1	1	—	1	2	12	1	1	1	4	2	RIAA: Platinum; MC: Platinum; BPI: Silver	Winner in You
1986	"Oh, People"	29	7	—	9	—	—	42	10	31	36	26		Winner in You
1986	"Kiss Away the Pain"	—	13	—	12	—	—	—	—	—	—	—		Winner in You
1987	"Something Special (Is Gonna Happen Tonight)"	—	50	10	42	—	—	—	—	—	—	110		Winner in You
1987	"The Last Unbroken Heart" (with Bill Champlin)	—	—	—	—	15	—	—	—	—	—	—		Miami Vice II
1987	"Just the Facts"	—	33	—	35	—	—	—	—	—	—	—		Dragnet
1989	"If You Asked Me To"	79	10	—	8	11	163	—	—	—	—	133		Be Yourself
1989	"Yo Mister"	—	6	—	7	—	—	—	—	43	—	127		Be Yourself
1990	"I Can't Complain"	—	65	—	71	—	—	—	—	—	—	—		Be Yourself
1991	"Superwoman" (with Gladys Knight & Dionne Warwick) ^{[A]}	—	19	—	30	—	—	—	—	—	—	—		Good Woman
1991	"Feels Like Another One"	—	3	17	3	—	—	—	—	—	—	—		Burnin'
1991	"Somebody Loves You Baby (You Know Who It Is)"	—	2	—	2	—	—	—	—	—	—	—		Burnin'
1992	"When You've Been Blessed (Feels Like Heaven)"	—	4	—	2	—	—	—	—	—	—	—		Burnin'
1992	"When You Love Somebody (Saving My Love for You)"	—	70	—	33	—	—	—	—	—	—	—		Burnin'
1992	"All Right Now"	—	30	—	32	—	—	—	—	—	—	—		Live!
1993	"With Your Hand upon My Heart" (with Michael Crawford)	—	—	—	—	—	59	—	—	—	—	—		A Touch of Music in the Night
1994	"The Right Kinda Lover"	61	8	1	5	—	—	—	—	—	—	50		Gems
1994	"All This Love"	—	42	—	31	—	—	—	—	—	—	—		Gems
1995	"I Never Stopped Loving You"	—	67	—	40	—	—	—	—	—	—	—		Gems
1997	"When You Talk About Love"	56	12	1	n/a	—	—	—	—	—	50	—		Flame
1997	"Shoe Was on the Other Foot"	—	35	10	n/a	—	—	—	—	—	—	—		Flame
1998	"Someone Like You" ^{[A]}	—	43	—	n/a	—	—	—	—	—	—	—		Flame
2000	"Too Many Tears, Too Many Times"	—	—	—	n/a	—	—	—	—	—	—	—		When a Woman Loves
2000	"Call Me Gone"	—	—	—	n/a	—	—	—	—	—	—	—		When a Woman Loves
2001	"Why Do We Hurt Each Other"	—	—	—	n/a	—	—	—	—	—	—	—		When a Woman Loves
2003	"Way Up There"	—	—	—	n/a	—	—	—	—	—	—	—		Church: Songs of Soul & Inspiration
2003	"You Are Everything" (with Terry Steele)	—	—	—	n/a	—	—	—	—	—	—	—		Day by Day
2004	"New Day"	93	36	11	n/a	—	—	—	—	—	—	—		Timeless Journey
2004	"Gotta Go Solo" (with Ronald Isley)	89	31	—	n/a	—	—	—	—	—	—	—		—N/a
2005	"Ain't No Way" (with Mary J. Blige)	—	62	—	n/a	—	—	—	—	—	—	—		Classic Moments
2006	"When Love Begins" (with Yolanda Adams)	—	68	—	n/a	—	—	—	—	—	—	—		The Gospel According To Patti LaBelle
2007	"Anything" (with Mary Mary, Kanye West & Consequence)	—	64	—	n/a	—	—	—	—	—	—	—		The Gospel According To Patti LaBelle
"—" denotes a recording that did not chart or was not released in that territory.

Notes

- ^{A} Did not chart on the Hot R&B/Hip-Hop Songs charts (Billboard rules at the time prevented album cuts from charting). Chart peak listed represents the Hot R&B/Hip-Hop Airplay chart.

== Other Billboard charts ==
Adult R&B Airplay

Year	Song title	Peak
1994	"The Right Kinda Lover"	1
1994	"All This Love"	30
1997	"When You Talk About Love"	1
1997	"Shoe Was on the Other Foot"	2
1998	"Someone Like You"	9
2000	"Call Me Gone"	10
2001	"Why Do We Hurt Each Other"	35
2004	"New Day"	4
2004	"Gotta Go Solo" (featuring Ron Isley)	1
2005	"Ain't No Way" (featuring Mary J. Blige)	13
2006	"Where Love Begins" (featuring Yolanda Adams)	17
2007	"Anything" (featuring Mary Mary with Kanye West & Consequence)	21
2008	"What Do the Lonely Do at Christmas?"	40
2014	"Jesus" (Kem featuring Patti LaBelle & Ronald Isley)	25

Hot R&B/Hip-Hop Singles Sales

Year	Song title	Peak
1992	"When You've Been Blessed (Feels Like Heaven)"	44
1994	"The Right Kinda Lover"	13
1997	"When You Talk About Love"	16
2004	"New Day"	60
2004	"Gotta Go Solo" (featuring Ron Isley)	1

Mainstream R&B/Hip-Hop Airplay

Year	Song title	Peak
1994	"The Right Kinda Lover"	6
1994	"All This Love"	40
1997	"When You Talk About Love"	14

R&B Digital Song Sales

Year	Song title	Peak
2013	"Jesus" (Kem featuring Patti LaBelle & Ronald Isley)	15

Dance Singles Sales

Year	Song title	Peak
1985	"New Attitude" / "Axel F"	1
1985	"Stir It Up" (remix)	7
1986	"On My Own"	1
1986	"Oh, People" (remix)	21
1987	"Something Special (Is Gonna Happen Tonight)"	40
1989	"Yo Mister"	44
1991	"Feels Like Another One"	12
1994	"The Right Kinda Lover"	13
1997	"When You Talk About Love"	27

Gospel Airplay

Year	Song title	Peak
2006	"Walk Around Heaven"	15
2019	"Changed" (featuring Deborah Joy Winans)	27

Gospel Digital Song Sales

Year	Song title	Peak
2019	"Ohhh Lord"	3
2019	"Changed" (featuring Deborah Joy Winans)	19

== Labelle (1962–1976) ==
The group was known as The Blue Belles (a.k.a. Patti La Belle and Her Blue Belles; Patti LaBelle and the Bluebelles) from 1962 to 1970, changing their name to simply Labelle in 1971.

=== Studio albums ===
Year	Album	Peak chart positions					Certifications	Record label
Year	Album	US	US R&B	AUS	CAN	NL	Certifications	Record label
1963	Sleigh Bells, Jingle Bells and Bluebelles	—	—	—	—	—		Newtown
1966	Over the Rainbow	—	20	—	—	—		Atlantic
1967	Dreamer	—	—	—	—	—		Atlantic
1971	Labelle	—	—	—	—	—		Warner Bros.
1971	Gonna Take a Miracle (with Laura Nyro)	46	41	—	—	—		Columbia
1972	Moon Shadow	—	42	—	—	—		Warner Bros.
1973	Pressure Cookin'	—	—	—	—	—		RCA
1974	Nightbirds	7	4	15	12	8	RIAA: Gold	Epic
1975	Phoenix	44	10	52	—	—		Epic
1976	Chameleon	94	21	—	—	—		Epic
2008	Back to Now	45	9	—	—	—		Verve
"—" denotes a recording that did not chart or was not released in that territory.

=== Live albums ===
- Sweethearts of the Apollo (1963, Newtown)
- The Bluebelles on Stage (1965, Parkway)

=== Compilation albums ===
- Golden Classics (1993, Collectables)
- Over the Rainbow: The Atlantic Years (1994, Ichiban)
- Lady Marmalade: The Best of Patti and Labelle (1995, Legacy/Epic)
- Something Silver (1997, Warner Bros.)
- The Best of the Early Years (1999, Hip-O)
- The Anthology (2017, SoulMusic)

Singles

Year	Single	Peak chart positions							Certifications	Album
Year	Single	US	US R&B	US Dan	AUS	CAN	NL	UK	Certifications	Album
1962	"I Sold My Heart to the Junkman"^{[A]}	15	13	—	—	—	—	—	RIAA: Gold	—N/a
1962	"I Found a New Love"	122	—	—	—	—	—	—		—N/a
1962	"Tear After Tear"	—	—	—	—	—	—	—		—N/a
1963	"Cool Water"	127	—	—	—	—	—	—		—N/a
1963	"Decatur Street"	—	—	—	—	—	—	—		—N/a
1963	"Down the Aisle (The Wedding Song)"	37	14	—	—	—	—	—		—N/a
1964	"You'll Never Walk Alone"	34	32	—	—	—	—	—		—N/a
1964	"One Phone Call (Will Do)"	—	—	—	—	—	—	—		—N/a
1964	"Danny Boy"	76	15	—	—	—	—	—		—N/a
1965	"All or Nothing"	68	—	—	—	—	—	—		Over the Rainbow
1966	"Over the Rainbow"	—	—	—	—	—	—	—		Over the Rainbow
1966	"Ebb Tide"	—	—	—	—	—	—	—		Over the Rainbow
1966	"I'm Still Waiting"	—	36	—	—	—	—	—		Dreamer
1966	"Take Me for a Little While"	89	36	—	—	—	—	—		Dreamer
1967	"Always Something There to Remind Me"	125	—	—	—	—	—	—		Dreamer
1967	"Dreamer"	—	—	—	—	—	—	—		Dreamer
1967	"Oh My Love"	—	—	—	—	—	—	—		—N/a
1968	"Wonderful"	—	—	—	—	—	—	—		—N/a
1969	"Dance to the Rhythm of Love"	—	—	—	—	—	—	—		—N/a
1969	"Pride's No Match for Love"	—	—	—	—	—	—	—		—N/a
1970	"Trustin' in You"	—	—	—	—	—	—	—		—N/a
1971	"Morning Much Better"	—	—	—	—	—	—	—		Labelle
1972	"It's Gonna Take a Miracle" (with Laura Nyro)	103	—	—	—	—	—	—		Gonna Take a Miracle
1972	"Moon Shadow"	—	—	—	—	—	—	—		Moon Shadow
1972	"Ain't It Sad It's All Over"	—	—	—	—	—	—	—		Moon Shadow
1973	"Open Up Your Heart"	—	—	—	—	—	—	—		Pressure Cookin'
1973	"Sunshine (Woke Me Up This Morning)"	—	—	—	—	—	—	—		Pressure Cookin'
1974	"Lady Marmalade"	1	1	7	13	1	2	17	RIAA: Gold; MC: Gold	Nightbirds
1975	"What Can I Do for You?"	48	8	7	—	52	—	—		Nightbirds
1975	"Messin' with My Mind"	—	19	8	—	—	—	—		Phoenix
1975	"Far as We Felt Like Goin'"	—	99	—	—	—	—	—		Phoenix
1976	"Get You Somebody New"	102	50	—	—	—	—	—		Chameleon
1976	"Isn't It a Shame "	—	18	—	—	—	—	—		Chameleon
1995	"Turn It Out"	—	—	1	—	—	—	—		Music from the Motion Picture To Wong Foo, Thanks for Everything! Julie Newmar
2008	"Roll Out" (with Wyclef Jean)	—	—	—	—	—	—	—		Back to Now
2008	"Superlover"	—	62	8	—	—	—	—		Back to Now
"—" denotes a recording that did not chart or was not released in that territory.

- ^{A} "I Sold My Heart to the Junkman" was first recorded by The Starlets but was credited as The Blue Bells.

== Other appearances ==
Year	Song title	Album
1984	"Love Has Finally Come at Last" (with Bobby Womack)	Poet II
1984	"It Takes a Lot of Strength to Say Goodbye" (with Bobby Womack)	Poet II
1984	"Through the Eyes of a Child" (with Bobby Womack)	Poet II
1985	"Don't Make Me Sorry"	Into the Night: Music from the Motion Picture Soundtrack
1986	"The Last Unbroken Heart" (with Bill Champlin)	Miami Vice II (soundtrack)
1987	"Just the Facts"	Music from the Original Motion Picture Soundtrack "Dragnet"
1989	"Total Concentration"	Sing: Music from the Original Motion Picture Soundtrack
1990	"I Love It When I'm Naughty"	Am I Cool or What?
1991	"We're Not Makin' Love Anymore" (duet with Michael Bolton)	Time, Love & Tenderness
1991	"We Haven't Finished Yet" (with Tressa Thomas and Billy Valentine)	The Five Heartbeats: Music from the Motion Picture
1991	"Barbeque Bess"	Fried Green Tomatoes: Original Motion Picture Soundtrack
1992	"Ready for a Miracle" (with Edwin Hawkins)	Leap of Faith: Music from the Motion Picture Soundtrack
1994	"Bewitched, Bothered and Bewildered" (duet with Frank Sinatra)	Duets II
1995	"My Love, Sweet Love"	Waiting to Exhale: Original Soundtrack Album
1996	"America" (with Natalie Cole and Sheila E.)	The Songs of West Side Story
2002	"The Voice Inside My Heart"	John Q. soundtrack
2003	"You Are My Friend" (with Shirley Caesar)	Shirley Caesar and Friends
2003	"I Know It Was the Blood" (with Shirley Caesar)	Shirley Caesar and Friends
2004	"Black Butterfly"	Johnson Family Vacation: Music from and Inspired by the Motion Picture
2005	"Stir it up" (with Joss Stone)	Chicken Little: An Original Walt Disney Records Soundtrack
2005	"Shout" (with Ray Charles and the Andrae Crouch Singers)	Genius & Friends
2005	"Roses" (Kanye West song)	Late Registration
2005	"I Wanna Be Free"	Music from the Soundtrack of Tyler Perry's Diary of a Mad Black Woman
2005	"Phenomenal Woman" (with Olivia Newton-John)	Stronger Than Before
2006	"One of These Mornings" (Moby featuring Patti LaBelle)	Miami Vice: Original Motion Picture Soundtrack
2006	"Here and Now" (Luther Vandross song)	So Amazing: An All-Star Tribute to Luther Vandross
2006	"I Wish" (with Fantasia and Yolanda Adams)	Happy Feet: Music from the Motion Picture
2010	"Soul Brother" (Harold Faltermeyer)	Cop Out: Original Motion Picture Soundtrack
2011	"Lady Marmalade" (live December 7, 1974)	The Best of Soul Train Live
