= Labelle discography =

Cataloging of published recordings by Labelle

- Studio albums: 11
- Live albums: 2
- Compilation albums: 5
- Singles: 36
- Music videos: 4

This is the discography documenting albums and singles released by the American female vocal group Labelle. The group was known as The Ordettes from 1958 to 1961 and The Blue Belles (a.k.a. Patti La Belle and Her Blue Belles; Patti LaBelle and the Bluebelles) from 1962 to 1970, changing their name to simply Labelle in 1971.

== Albums ==
=== Studio albums ===
Year	Album	Peak chart positions					Certifications	Record label
Year	Album	US	US R&B	AUS	CAN	NL	Certifications	Record label
1963	Sleigh Bells, Jingle Bells and Bluebelles	—	—	—	—	—		Newtown
1966	Over the Rainbow	—	20	—	—	—		Atlantic
1967	Dreamer	—	—	—	—	—		Atlantic
1971	Labelle	—	—	—	—	—		Warner Bros.
1971	Gonna Take a Miracle (with Laura Nyro)	46	41	—	—	—		Columbia
1972	Moon Shadow	—	42	—	—	—		Warner Bros.
1973	Pressure Cookin'	—	—	—	—	—		RCA
1974	Nightbirds	7	4	15	12	8	RIAA: Gold	Epic
1975	Phoenix	44	10	52	—	—		Epic
1976	Chameleon	94	21	—	—	—		Epic
2008	Back to Now	45	9	—	—	—		Verve
"—" denotes a recording that did not chart or was not released in that territory.

=== Live albums ===
- Sweethearts of the Apollo (1963, Newtown)
- The Bluebelles on Stage (1965, Parkway)

=== Compilation albums ===
- Golden Classics (1993, Collectables)
- Over the Rainbow: The Atlantic Years (1994, Ichiban)
- Lady Marmalade: The Best of Patti and Labelle (1995, Legacy/Epic)
- Something Silver (1997, Warner Bros.)
- The Best of the Early Years (1999, Hip-O)
- The Anthology (2017, SoulMusic)

== Singles ==
Year	Single	Peak chart positions							Certifications	Album
Year	Single	US	US R&B	US Dan	AUS	CAN	NL	UK	Certifications	Album
1962	"I Sold My Heart to the Junkman"^{[A]}	15	13	—	—	—	—	—	RIAA: Gold	—N/a
1962	"I Found a New Love"	122	—	—	—	—	—	—		—N/a
1962	"Tear After Tear"	—	—	—	—	—	—	—		—N/a
1963	"Cool Water"	127	—	—	—	—	—	—		—N/a
1963	"Decatur Street"	—	—	—	—	—	—	—		—N/a
1963	"Down the Aisle (The Wedding Song)"	37	14	—	—	—	—	—		—N/a
1964	"You'll Never Walk Alone"	34	32	—	—	—	—	—		—N/a
1964	"One Phone Call (Will Do)"	—	—	—	—	—	—	—		—N/a
1964	"Danny Boy"	76	15	—	—	—	—	—		—N/a
1965	"All or Nothing"	68	—	—	—	—	—	—		Over the Rainbow
1966	"Over the Rainbow"	—	—	—	—	—	—	—		Over the Rainbow
1966	"Ebb Tide"	—	—	—	—	—	—	—		Over the Rainbow
1966	"I'm Still Waiting"	—	36	—	—	—	—	—		Dreamer
1966	"Take Me for a Little While"	89	36	—	—	—	—	—		Dreamer
1967	"Always Something There to Remind Me"	125	—	—	—	—	—	—		Dreamer
1967	"Dreamer"	—	—	—	—	—	—	—		Dreamer
1967	"Oh My Love"	—	—	—	—	—	—	—		—N/a
1968	"Wonderful"	—	—	—	—	—	—	—		—N/a
1969	"Dance to the Rhythm of Love"	—	—	—	—	—	—	—		—N/a
1969	"Pride's No Match for Love"	—	—	—	—	—	—	—		—N/a
1970	"Trustin' in You"	—	—	—	—	—	—	—		—N/a
1971	"Morning Much Better"	—	—	—	—	—	—	—		Labelle
1972	"It's Gonna Take a Miracle" (with Laura Nyro)	103	—	—	—	—	—	—		Gonna Take a Miracle
1972	"Moon Shadow"	—	—	—	—	—	—	—		Moon Shadow
1972	"Ain't It Sad It's All Over"	—	—	—	—	—	—	—		Moon Shadow
1973	"Open Up Your Heart"	—	—	—	—	—	—	—		Pressure Cookin'
1973	"Sunshine (Woke Me Up This Morning)"	—	—	—	—	—	—	—		Pressure Cookin'
1974	"Lady Marmalade"	1	1	7	13	1	2	17	RIAA: Gold; MC: Gold	Nightbirds
1975	"What Can I Do for You?"	48	8	7	—	52	—	—		Nightbirds
1975	"Messin' with My Mind"	—	19	8	—	—	—	—		Phoenix
1975	"Far as We Felt Like Goin'"	—	99	—	—	—	—	—		Phoenix
1976	"Get You Somebody New"	102	50	—	—	—	—	—		Chameleon
1976	"Isn't It a Shame"	—	18	—	—	—	—	—		Chameleon
1995	"Turn It Out"	—	—	1	—	—	—	—		To Wong Foo, Thanks for Everything! Julie Newmar
2008	"Roll Out" (with Wyclef Jean)	—	—	—	—	—	—	—		Back to Now
2008	"Superlover"	—	62	8	—	—	—	—		Back to Now
"—" denotes a recording that did not chart or was not released in that territory.

- ^{A} "I Sold My Heart to the Junkman" was recorded by The Starlets but was credited as The Blue Bells.

== Other appearances ==
Year	Song	Album
2011	"Lady Marmalade" (live December 7, 1974)	The Best of Soul Train Live
