= Sarah Dash =

American singer (1945–2021)

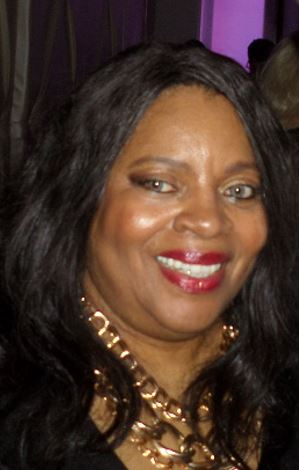
- Dash in 2014

Background information
- Born: August 18, 1945; Trenton, New Jersey, U.S.
- Died: September 20, 2021 (aged 76)
- Genres: R&B; soul; funk; disco; funk rock; blues; rock; pop; dance music; jazz; hip hop
- Occupations: Singer; songwriter
- Years active: 1961–2021
- Labels: Kirshner; Manhattan; EMI; Megatone; Cutting
- Website: sarahdash.net

Sarah Dash (August 18, 1945 – September 20, 2021) was an American singer. She first appeared on the music scene as a member of Patti LaBelle & The Bluebelles. Dash was later a member of Labelle, and worked as a singer, session musician, and sidewoman for The Rolling Stones, and Keith Richards.

== Biography ==
=== Early career ===
The seventh of 13 children, Dash was born in Trenton, New Jersey. Her father was a pastor at the Trenton Church of Christ, while her mother was a nurse. Although she initially sang gospel music, Dash turned to secular music as a pre-teen when she formed a vocal duo, the Capris. When she moved to Philadelphia in the mid-1960s she got reacquainted with fellow adopted Philadelphian Nona Hendryx and Philadelphia natives Patricia "Patsy" Holte (AKA Patti LaBelle) and Sundray Tucker. In 1961, following the break-up of a rival girl group, Hendryx and Dash joined Holte and Tucker in "The Ordettes". In 1961, Tucker was replaced by Philadelphia-born Cindy Birdsong and the quartet became The Bluebelles in 1962. The group changed their name again to Patti LaBelle and the Bluebelles after Holte was advised to adopt the stage name of Patti LaBelle. Among the Bluebelles hits were the doo-wop classic, "I Sold My Heart to the Junkman" and doo-wop-esque R&B ballads "You'll Never Walk Alone" and "Danny Boy", the top forty classic, "Down the Aisle", the soul standard "All or Nothing" and their now-legendary rendition of "Over the Rainbow", which LaBelle later transformed into a tour-de-force in her 1981 solo cover. Dash sang with a sharp soprano.

=== Labelle ===
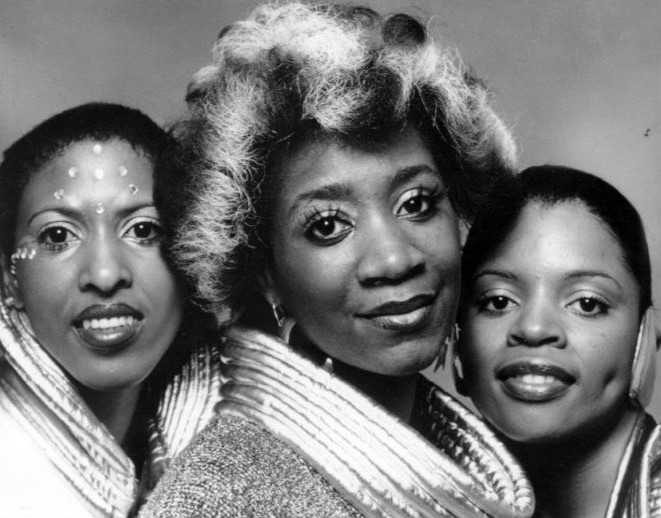
L-R: Nona Hendryx, Patti LaBelle, Sarah Dash, 1975

In 1967, Birdsong left the group to join The Supremes and four years later, The Bluebelles changed their name to Labelle and began recording material that set them apart from other girl groups including songs of political, social and sexual matters, transforming them into a "hard-rocking, sexually and politically outspoken group". Much like The Supremes' Mary Wilson, Dash was often the "middle" of two of the group's extremes, Nona Hendryx and Patti LaBelle, who often had differed in the group's change of direction before LaBelle eventually agreed to "go along with it". After a tour of England where they changed managers, hiring Vicki Wickham, in 1971, the group ditched their bouffant wigs and dresses for Afros and jeans, releasing transitional records such as Labelle (which included the Hendryx-penned sexual "Morning Much Better") and Moon Shadow (which featured the group's gospel-fueled renditions of the Pete Townshend penned "Won't Get Fooled Again", and Cat Stevens' "Moon Shadow").

During this period, the group gained notice from the mainstream after opening for singer-songwriter Laura Nyro and recording an album, Gonna Take a Miracle, together. They also toured with British rock group The Who, leading up to the 1973 release of Pressure Cookin' This featured more songwriting from Hendryx and a more unified group effort in which Dash sang co-lead, including the ballad, "Can I Speak to You Before You Go to Hollywood?", where Dash sings most of the song. Dash's strong vocals in the group provided for balance and stability when LaBelle and Hendryx occasionally went off on vocal tangents or were pulling audience members up onto the stage to dance. Dash also wrote several songs.

Despite the group's cult raves for their early material, their critical success did not translate to commercial acclaim until the releases of 1974's Nightbirds (which featured the group's biggest smash single of their careers, "Lady Marmalade") and 1975's Phoenix. Following the release of 1976's Chameleon and a 1977 tour, the group agreed to split after the trio failed to come to terms with material (the group were working on an album titled Shaman when they split) and had finally "rocked and rolled themselves out".

=== Solo career ===
In 1978, Dash released her self-titled debut album, which included the top-ten disco hit, "Sinner Man". She also performed vocals on several ballads, notably "You," and "We're Lovers After All," and "I Can't Believe Someone Like You Could Really Love Me," (with a full gospel choir backing); she also had another minor disco hit with "(Come and Take) This Candy from Your Baby". Dash enjoyed much success and television and public appearances with "Sinner Man." At this time, she was asked to compose and sing "For The Love of You" (the theme song for the 1980s PBS show Watch Your Mouth) and "Bringing It All Home." She also guest-starred on an episode of Watch Your Mouth, playing a fictional character, a super diva with an attitude, "Tessie Bright".

However, on her Don Kirshner albums, and especially Ooh La La, Sarah Dash, (1980) she was given substandard material to work with, although she wrote "I Feel Good Being Me" for this album. It featured one disco track, "Ooh La La, Too Soon," which was used in a Sassoon jeans commercial, and Phyllis Hyman provided backing vocals to the album. After releasing one more album Close Enough, for Kirshner, which features ballads such as "Somebody's Angel" and "God Bless You," and the rocker, "Paradise," Dash left Kirshner for other opportunities.

In 1983, Dash released two dance singles for Megatone Records in San Francisco, both produced by Patrick Cowley. The first, "Low Down Dirty Rhythm" was basically ignored, but the second single "Lucky Tonight" (featuring background vocals by Sylvester), was much more successful, even rising to the #5 spot on Billboard's Dance Chart, and was even a Billboard "Pick of the Week."

Dash's next endeavor was the recording she made on the rap record, Satisfaction, for High Fidelity Three in 1985. Also during this time, Dash did session work for The O'Jays, Nile Rodgers of Chic (duetting on a ballad with Rodgers, "My Love Song for You" from, The Adventures in the Land of the Good Groove), The Marshall Tucker Band, and David Johansen.

In the later 1980s, she teamed up with musician Dr. York for the duet "It's Too Late" (for which York took out advertisement space on the cover of Billboard magazine, to little success).

Then in 1988, she was signed to Manhattan Records, (via EMI) and released the album entitled You're All I Need. This set included a title track duet with Patti LaBelle; a further duet "Don't Make Me Wait" with Ray, Goodman & Brown; and "To Tell You The Truth". It was met with only moderate success, and Dash did not record another album thereafter. Subsequently, Dash released a little-noticed dance single in 1990, "When You Talk to Me/ Manhandled," with Disc jockey Jellybean Benitez.

A dance music single with gospel lyrics called "Hold On (He'll Be Right There)," produced by Jason King and Gavin Bradley, was released in 2012.

=== Reunited with the Rolling Stones ===
In 1988, Keith Richards invited Dash to accompany him on tour: her association with him led to another world tour, a tour with Richards' X-pensive Winos, appearances on two of his albums, and on The Rolling Stones' Steel Wheels album in 1989. With Richards, she guested on Live at the Hollywood Palladium in 1988, and Main Offender, in 1992. In the early 1990s, Dash developed her own one-woman show, "Dash of Diva," performing at different club venues, as well as doing a more jazz-flavored set that resulted in various appearances. In 1995, she reunited with Patti LaBelle and Nona Hendryx to record the track "Turn It Out" for the movie soundtrack, To Wong Foo, Thanks for Everything! Julie Newmar, garnering a No. 1 dance music hit in the process. Also in 1988, Dash was asked to add her backing vocals to the Rolling Stones' Steel Wheels album, which eventually led to a tour with her old friend Keith Richards. They became close when Dash was still performing with Patti LaBelle and The Blue Belles, who opened for Stones in the early 1960s. She recorded the duet "Make No Mistake" with him, and she took the lead vocal on "Time Is on My Side", showcasing her powerful delivery and vocal range, which, Keith has said in his autobiography, is 'the best version of that song he's ever heard'. She also recorded as lead vocalist for "Rock Awhile". For his next album, Dash wrote and sang another track, "Body Talk". Another highlight during her tour with Richards was her singing the female vocal on "Gimme Shelter." Dash started the song with her silvery "Oohs' and then cut loose on her solo in the middle of the song. Another contribution is only available on the Keith Richards song "Eileen", a CD single from his album Main Offender on the Virgin Records label. In 1992, Dash added her background vocals on the collaboration between Bo Diddley and Ronnie Wood's Live at the Ritz album.

=== Later career and Labelle reunion ===
Dash made later guest appearances on albums, including Temptation and Persuasions' cut "Greener." From time to time, she also performed jazz/blues shows in small clubs on the east coast. She took a break to work on her autobiography, Dash of Diva. She decided with her friend and confidante Pam Johnson on scripted excerpts and wrote a musical with the same title debut at The Cross Roads Theater in New Brunswick.

Labelle, having reunited for television a few times over the years and sporadic recordings, recorded in January 2006, a tribute to civil rights leader Rosa Parks tentatively titled, "Dear Rosa." In 2008, the long-awaited new album from Labelle founders Patti LaBelle, Nona Hendryx & Sarah Dash, Back to Now, was released to rave reviews. Dash sang lead vocals in the group's political song, "System", which featured LaBelle and Hendryx singing side by side to Dash in autotone, resurrecting songs that did not make the final cut from earlier recordings, including Cole Porter's composition, "Miss Otis Regrets" amongst other songs. Dash's voice had taken a while to return after an injury on the New York City Subway and hospitalization, but she recovered her voice by the time of the recording. Producers on the project included Lenny Kravitz, Wyclef Jean, and Philadelphia writer/producers Kenny Gamble & Leon Huff.

Dash headlined for a month in the San Francisco Cirque du Soleil-influenced Teatro Zinzanni and performed at the 2007 Lesbian, Bisexual, Gay, Transgender parade. She also worked on a gospel album at the time.

Dash was honored by her hometown of Trenton, New Jersey, by being the grand marshal in the annual Thanksgiving Day Parade. The parade was held on Saturday November 22, 2008. The honor was presented to Dash during a time when her hometown of Trenton was at a point where morale was at an all-time low and violent crimes such as murder reached an all-time high. The hope was that such honors would spark encouragement in the city and show that people from Trenton can reach a measure of success with hard work.

It was announced in 2012 that Dash planned to release a full-length gospel album. She released a ballad from the album called "I'm Still Here" in late 2011, and a dance music single "Hold On (He'll Be Right There)," in May 2012.

Dash along with the group LaBelle, were inducted into the Philadelphia Music Alliance Walk of Fame in October 2017.

In 2016, Dash was honored with a Lifetime Achievement Award by The National R&B Music Society.

=== Charity work ===
Much of Dash's focus since the early 1990s was on helping to raise money for homeless single women with children in New York. Dash received a citation from the deputy Mayor of New York City, Ruth Messinger, for her work and efforts in the underprivileged New York City community where she raised funds. Dash collected donations and funds she acquired for these mothers and their children which included clothing, toys, books, after-school activities, excursions to amusement parks, theater in the parks, and food.

=== Personal life ===
Sarah Dash was married briefly and had no children. The author of an autobiography, Dash of Diva, Dash also wrote and appeared in a self-penned musical of the same title that was presented at the Cross Roads Theater in New Brunswick, New Jersey.

=== Death ===
Dash died unexpectedly on September 20, 2021, at the age of 76. No cause of death was given.

Dash's last performance was on September 18, 2021 (two days before her death) in Atlantic City, New Jersey. Patti LaBelle called Dash up to the stage for them to sing a song together.

== Discography ==
=== Albums ===
- Sarah Dash, 1978, Kirshner Records
- Ooh La La, Sarah Dash, 1980, Kirshner Records
- Close Enough, 1983, Kirshner Records
- You're All I Need, 1988, EMI

=== Singles ===
- "Sinner Man" (1978), Kirshner Records
- "(Come and Take This) Candy from Your Baby" (1978), Kirshner
- "Ooh La La Too Soon" (1980), Kirshner
- "Leaving Again" (1983), Kirshner
- "Low Down Dirty Rhythm" (1983), Megatone Records
- "Lucky Tonight" (1983), Megatone Records
- "Satisfaction" (with High Fidelity Three) (1985), Cutting Records
- "It's Too Late" (with Dr. York) (1985)
- "Feel Good" (1988), EMI
- "When You Talk to Me" (1990), EMI-Manhattan
- "Sparkle" (with Ari Gold) (2011), Gold 18 Records
- "Hold On (He'll Be Right There)" (2012), Superlatude
- "Sinner Man" (2021 Remixes), House of Pride Music

== Film and television ==
- SOUL!, 1968
- Sgt. Pepper's Lonely Heart's Club Band, 1978, MCA
- Midnight Special, 1978
- Merv Griffin Show, 1978
- Dinah Shore Show, 1978
- Dance Fever, 1978
- Soul Train, 1978
- Don Kirshner's Rock Concert, 1978
- Watch Your Mouth (acting as character 'Tessie Bright'), 1978, PBS
- Soul Train, 1978
- Mr. SOUL!, 2018 (archival footage)

== Theater ==
- Teatro Zinzanni (San Francisco), May – August 2007

== Sources ==
- Lewis, Pete. "Labelle in-depth interview by Pete Lewis, Blues & Soul May 2009"
- Dillinger, Tim. "Interview with Sarah Dash" June 2007. Available: iTunes.
- "Gals Too Big for Broadway." PlanetOut.com (2006)
- LaBelle, Patti, with Laura B. Randolph (1996). "Don't Block the Blessings: Revelations of a Lifetime." New York, NY: Riverhead Books. ISBN 1-57322-039-6.
- Pratt, Paul E. "Zinzanni Adds Dash of Diva to 'Ceative Fantasy'" San Fanciso Bay Times. July 5, 2007 http://www.sfbaytimes.com/?sec=article&article_id=6595
- Schaefer, Stephen. "Sarah Dash: RED." Disco World. March 1979, p. 32.
- Taraborrelli, Randy J. "Sarah Dash: The Next Group I Join Will Be Group Health Insurance." Inside Gossip. March 1989, p. 32.
- Teatro Zinzanni website "Bio" May 2007. Available: http://love.zinzanni.org/cast.htm
- West, Damon. "Sarah Dash: One Hot Lady." In Touch Magazine. June 1990, p. 18.
