= Larry LeGaspi =

American fashion designer

Larry LeGaspi (June 25, 1950 – April 26, 2001) was an American fashion designer best known for creating signature designs worn by Labelle, Kiss, Grace Jones, George Clinton and Funkadelic, Divine, and other notables in the 1970s and 1980s.

== Early years and career ==
Legaspi was born in Lakewood Township, New Jersey, and attended the Fashion Institute of Technology in New York City. He subsequently opened his own studio and boutique, Moonstone, where he sold his Art Deco-inspired futuristic styles in a space decorated with a moon and stars motif.

By 1972, he had started designing costumes for the members of Labelle, whom he had met after one of their concerts in New York. He created distinct variations of what he described as his "futuristic concept" for each singer, replete with metallic designs expressing his belief that 1970s fashion would soon embrace a "Space Deco" style resonant with 1930s motifs. LeGaspi's designs would go on to have an extensive influence on 1970s music industry costume design and popular culture, most notably in his creation of the costumes worn by the band Kiss. Within the fashion industry, the mass market popularity of futuristic designs following Star Wars and the rise of disco was seen as a fulfillment of LeGaspi's vision earlier in the decade.

LeGaspi also created costume designs for theater and club performances, such as the costumes for Divine's play Pork and Grace Jones' designs in her 1970s nightclub act. LeGaspi's work on the stage was seen by Afro-futurist musician George Clinton, who recounted to Vogue that "I watched a lot of these plays, and when we first did the Mothership Connection album in 1975, I knew that I had to get the costuming from Larry LeGaspi, who was a famous costume designer for Broadway and bands like Kiss and Labelle.” Together with his iconic designs for Labelle, Kiss, and Clinton, his work for the stage and social events embodied a range of elements that presaged later developments in mainstream fashion design, including a blend of metallic futurism with black-leather primalism, the integration of electronic technology, designs that could transform into different looks, the use of flamboyant costume elements in personal dress, and stylized androgyny.

== Influence ==
Fashion designer Rick Owens attributes LeGaspi's work as the inspiration for his own career and celebrated LeGaspi in his Fall/Winter 2019 "Larry" menswear collection, shown in February 2019. According to Owens, LeGaspi's importance in fashion and culture stems from his creation of the silver-and-black 1970s style combining Art Deco, sci-fi, black soul culture, and sexuality, a subversive sensibility that LeGaspi's work for musicians such as LaBelle and Kiss took to mainstream middle America. In addition to his LeGaspi-inspired collection, Owens has also written a book on LeGaspi published by Rizzoli in September 2019 titled LeGaspi: Larry LeGaspi, the '70s, and the Future of Fashion.

== Personal life ==
LeGaspi was married to Valerie Arnoff. He was openly gay for his whole life, and was friends with Divine and part of the group of friends known as Divine's "New York family".

LeGaspi died of AIDS on April 26, 2001 at Mission-St. Joseph's Health System in Asheville, North Carolina. In reviewing Owens' Larry collection, the New York Times' culture and style critic Guy Trebay described the homage to LeGaspi, who "exercised an outsize influence on pop culture" but was unduly overlooked in recent years as a powerful reminder of the entire generation of designers lost due to the disease but deserving of contemporary recognition.

== Bibliography ==
- Allison Janae Hamilton, "Black Marvelous: An Examination of the Carnivalesque in African American Visual Culture," Ph.D. dissertation, New York University (2015).
- Diana L. Mankowski, "Gendering the Disco Inferno: Sexual Revolution, Liberation, and Popular Culture in 1970s America," Ph.D. dissertation, University of Michigan (2010).
- Francesca T. Royster, "Labelle, Funk, and the Politics of Flight and Fight," American Studies, 52:4 (2013), 77–98.
- Mark Redondo Villegas, "Savage Vernacular: Performing Race, Memory, and Hip Hop in Filipino America," Ph.D. dissertation, University of California-Irvine (2015).
