= Nightbirds =

1974 studio album by Labelle

Studio album by Labelle
- Released: September 13, 1974
- Recorded: 1974
- Studio: Sea Saint, New Orleans, Louisiana
- Genre: Funk; pop; soul; glam rock; disco
- Length: 36:40
- Label: Epic
- Producer: Allen Toussaint

Labelle chronology
Pressure Cookin' (1973)	Nightbirds (1974)	Phoenix (1975)

Singles from Nightbirds
- 1. "Lady Marmalade" Released: November 5, 1974; 2. "What Can I Do for You?" Released: April 1975

Nightbirds is an album by the all-female singing group Labelle, released in 1974 on Epic Records. The album features the group's biggest hit, "Lady Marmalade". It became their best-selling album.

== Background ==
Nona Hendryx became the primary songwriter for the group. Their first three albums—Labelle, Moon Shadow, and Pressure Cookin'—had seen limited commercial success. These albums blended elements of rock music with the group's soul/gospel roots from their days as Patti LaBelle and the Bluebelles. Despite limited chart success, the group gained recognition as an opening act for artists such as The Who, Laura Nyro, and The Rolling Stones. After touring with the Rolling Stones in 1973, Labelle signed with Epic Records.

Producer Allen Toussaint was assigned to the group, and they traveled to Toussaint's hometown of New Orleans to record Nightbirds. The album was completed in two months. Reflecting their glam rock-inspired stage costumes, the group incorporated elements of funk, a style they had explored on their previous album, Pressure Cookin, with the song "Goin' On a Holiday." This funk influence is prominent in songs like "Are You Lonely," "Somebody, Somewhere", "Space Children," and "Lady Marmalade". Other tracks, such as "Nightbirds" and "It Took a Long Time," showcase the group's range, while "You Turn Me On" offered a departure from the Bluebelles' earlier material.

== Reception ==
Professional ratings
Review scores
Source	Rating
Allmusic	4.5/5 stars
Christgau's Record Guide	A−
Rolling Stone	4.5/5 stars

Nightbirds became Labelle's most successful album, reaching the pop and R&B charts. It peaked at number seven on the R&B chart, driven by the success of "Lady Marmalade," one of the few songs not written by Nona Hendryx. "What Can I Do For You," their other hit single from the album, was written by Edward Batts and James Ellison. Touring band members Jeffrey Shannon (drums), Hector Seda (bass), and Leslie "Chuggy" Carter (percussion) contributed instrumental arrangements to the album and live performances. The album was certified platinum in the U.S. for sales exceeding one million copies, and Labelle was featured on the cover of Rolling Stone.

== Legacy ==
Nightbirds garnered praise for its fusion of R&B, soul, rock, and funk. The success of its singles contributed to the rise of disco. In 2003, Rolling Stone ranked the album number 272 on its list of the 500 greatest albums of all time, later revising its position to 274 in 2012. "Lady Marmalade" was inducted into the Grammy Hall of Fame in 2012. The song has been covered by numerous artists, including All Saints and a quartet featuring Christina Aguilera, Mýa, Lil' Kim, and Pink. "It Took a Long Time" was featured in the film Precious: Based on the Novel "Push" by Sapphire.

== Release history ==
In addition to the standard stereo version, Nightbirds was released in quadraphonic format on LP record and 8-track tape, using the SQ matrix system. Audio Fidelity reissued the album on Super Audio CD in 2015, including both the stereo and quadraphonic mixes.

== Track listing ==
All tracks are written by Nona Hendryx, except where noted.

Side one
No.	Title	Writer(s)	Length
1.	"Lady Marmalade"	Bob Crewe, Kenny Nolan	3:56
2.	"Somebody Somewhere"		3:25
3.	"Are You Lonely?"		3:12
4.	"It Took a Long Time"	Raymond Bloodworth, L. Russell Brown, Bob Crewe	4:03
5.	"Don't Bring Me Down"	Allen Toussaint	2:48
Total length:			17:24

Side two
No.	Title	Writer(s)	Length
6.	"What Can I Do for You?"	Edward Batts, James Budd Ellison	4:02
7.	"Nightbird"		3:09
8.	"Space Children"		3:02
9.	"All Girl Band"	Allen Toussaint	3:50
10.	"You Turn Me On"		4:37
Total length:			18:40

== Personnel ==
- Patti LaBelle, Nona Hendryx and Sarah Dash – lead and backing vocals
- Allen Toussaint – keyboards, percussion, guitar, arrangements
- Art Neville – organ
- George Porter Jr., Walter Payton – bass guitar
- Leo Nocentelli, Rev. Edward Levone Batts – guitar
- Smokey Johnson, Herman "Roscoe" Ernest III – drums
- James "Budd" Ellison – piano
- Earl Turbinton – alto saxophone, soprano saxophone, clarinet
- Alvin Thomas, Lon Price – tenor saxophone, flute
- Clyde Kerr, Jr., Steve Howard – trumpet
- Lester Caliste – trombone
- Carl Blouin – baritone saxophone
- Clarence Ford – alto saxophone
- Jeffrey Shannon – drums, arrangements, touring band member
- Hector Seda – bass guitar, arrangements, touring band member
- Leslie "Chuggy" Carter – percussion, arrangements, touring band member

Technical

- Vicki Wickham – executive producer
- Ken Laxton – engineer

== Charts ==
=== Weekly charts ===
Chart (1975)	Peak position
Australia Albums (Kent Music Report)	15
Dutch Albums (Album Top 100)	8
US Billboard 200	7
US Top R&B/Hip-Hop Albums (Billboard)	4

=== Year-end charts ===
Chart (1975)	Position
Dutch Albums (Album Top 100)	45
US Billboard 200	67
US Top R&B/Hip-Hop Albums (Billboard)	22

=== Singles ===
Year	Single	Chart positions			
Year	Single	US	US R&B	US Dance	AUS
1974	"Lady Marmalade"	1	1	1	13
