= Patti LaBelle =

American singer and actress (born 1944)

- LaBelle at Black Excellence Brunch 2026

Background information
- Also known as: Miss Patti
- Born: Patricia Louise Holte; May 24, 1944 (age 82); Philadelphia, Pennsylvania, U.S.
- Genres: R&B; soul; pop; dance
- Occupations: Singer; songwriter; actress
- Years active: 1960–present
- Labels: Epic; Philadelphia Int'l; MCA; Def Soul Classics; Umbrella; Bungalo; Resolution
- Formerly of: The Ordettes; Labelle
- Spouse: Armstead Edwards (m. 1969; div. 2003)
- Website: pattilabelle.com

Patricia Louise Holte (born May 24, 1944), known professionally as Patti LaBelle, is an American R&B singer and actress. She is also known as the "Godmother of Soul". LaBelle began her career in the early 1960s as lead singer and frontwoman of the vocal group Patti LaBelle and the Bluebelles. After the group's name changed to Labelle in the 1970s, they released the US number-one hit "Lady Marmalade". After the group disbanded in 1977, LaBelle began a solo career, achieving mainstream success in the 1980s with singles including "If Only You Knew", "New Attitude" and "Stir It Up". In 1986, she achieved both a US number-one album, Winner in You, and a US number-one single with "On My Own", a duet with Michael McDonald. LaBelle won a 1992 Grammy for Best Female R&B Vocal Performance for her album Burnin', and a second Grammy in 1999 for the live album Live! One Night Only. She reunited with her Labelle bandmates in 2008 for the album Back to Now.

LaBelle has also had success as an actress with a role in the Academy Award-nominated film A Soldier's Story, and in television shows such as A Different World and American Horror Story: Freak Show. In 1992, LaBelle starred in her own sitcom Out All Night. In 2002, LaBelle hosted her own lifestyle show, Living It Up with Patti LaBelle, on TV One. In 2015, LaBelle took part in the dance competition Dancing with the Stars. Labelle has given her name to brands of bedding, cookbooks and food, including Patti's Sweet Potato Pie, which became a viral sensation after featuring in a YouTube video that year.

In a career which has spanned seven decades, LaBelle has sold more than 50 million records worldwide. She has been inducted into the Grammy Hall of Fame, the Hollywood Walk of Fame, the Black Music & Entertainment Walk of Fame, and the Apollo Theater Hall of Fame. Rolling Stone included her on their list of 100 Greatest Singers. LaBelle is a dramatic soprano recognized for her vocal power, modal register range and emotive delivery.

== Early life and career ==
=== Patti LaBelle and the Bluebelles ===
Patricia Louise Holte was born in the Eastwick section of Southwest Philadelphia, Pennsylvania, the second-youngest child of Henry (1919–1989) and Bertha (née Robinson; 1916–1978) three children, and the next-to-youngest of five children overall. Her siblings were Thomas Hogan Jr. (1930–2013), Vivian Hogan (1932–1975), Barbara (1942–1982), and Jacqueline "Jackie" (1945–1989). Her father was a railroad worker and club performer and her mother was a domestic. Despite enjoying her childhood, LaBelle would later write in her memoirs, Don't Block the Blessings, that her parents' marriage was abusive. Shortly after her parents' divorce when she was 12, she was sexually molested by a family friend. She joined a local church choir at the Beulah Baptist Church at 10 and performed her first solo two years later. While she was growing up, she listened to secular music styles such as R&B and jazz music as well.

When she was 16, LaBelle won a talent competition at her high school, John Bartram High School. The success led to her first singing group, the Ordettes, in 1960 with schoolmates Jean Brown, Yvonne Hogen, and Johnnie Dawson. With LaBelle as the front woman, the group became a local attraction until two of its members left to marry, while another was forced to quit the group by her religious father. In 1962, the Ordettes included three new members: Cindy Birdsong; and Sarah Dash and Nona Hendryx, who had sung for another vocal group which was defunct at the time. That year, they auditioned for local record-label owner Harold Robinson, who agreed to work with the group after hearing LaBelle sing the song "I Sold My Heart to the Junkman". Initially, he had been dismissive of LaBelle, believing her to be "too dark and too plain".

Shortly after Robinson signed them, he had them record as the Blue Belles and they were selected to promote the recording of "I Sold My Heart to the Junkman", which had been recorded by The Starlets. It was recorded as a Blue Belles single due to label conflict. The Starlets' manager sued Harold Robinson after the Blue Belles were seen performing a lip-synching version of the song on American Bandstand. After settling out of court, Robinson altered the group's name to "Patti LaBelle and The Blue Belles". Robinson gave Holte the name "LaBelle", which meant "the beautiful" in French. Initially, a Billboard ad cited the group as "Patti Bell and the Blue Bells". In late 1963, the group entered the top 40 with the ballad, "Down the Aisle", which was distributed by King Records. This was soon followed by a rendition of "You'll Never Walk Alone", which was re-released by Cameo-Parkway Records and was another top 40 hit, followed by a rendition of "Danny Boy".

Following the dissolution of Cameo-Parkway in late 1965, the Bluebelles signed with Atlantic Records, where they had modest success with the songs "All or Nothing" and "Take Me for a Little While". Their Atlantic debut album, Over the Rainbow, featured their modern soul rendition of the title track. Birdsong left the group to join the Supremes in July 1967; three years later, they were dropped from Atlantic as well as their longtime manager Bernard Montague. Under the advice of Dusty Springfield, Vicki Wickham, producer of the UK music show Ready, Steady, Go, began managing the trio. Wickham's first direction was for the group to change their name to simply Labelle and renew their act, going for a more earthy look and sound that reflected progressive soul. In 1971, the group opened for the Who in several stops on the group's U.S. tour.

=== Labelle ===
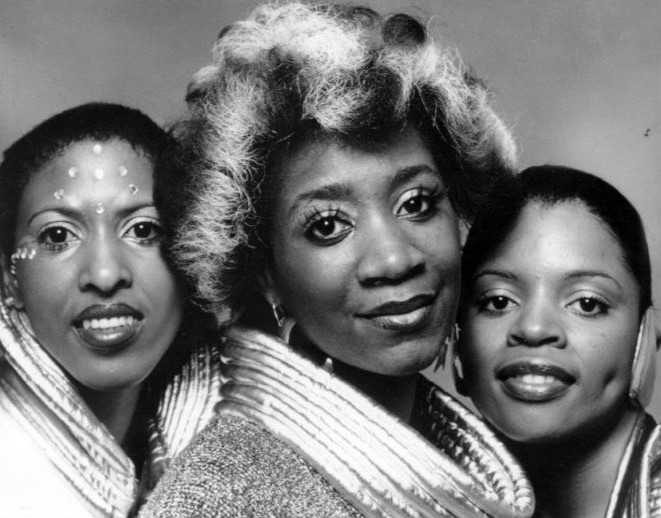
LaBelle (center) with her Labelle bandmates Nona Hendryx and Sarah Dash in a 1974 promotional photo

Labelle signed with Warner Bros. Records and released their self-titled debut album in 1971. The record's progressive soul sound and its blending of rock, funk, soul and gospel rhythms was a departure from their early girl-group R&B sound. In the same year, they sang background vocals on Laura Nyro's album, Gonna Take a Miracle. A year later in 1972, the group released Moon Shadow, which repeated the progressive sound of the previous album. In 1973, influenced by glam rockers David Bowie and Elton John, Wickham had the group dressed in silver space suits and luminescent makeup, designed for them by Larry LeGaspi.

After their third successive album, Pressure Cookin', failed to generate a hit, Labelle signed with Epic Records in 1974, releasing their most successful album to date, with Nightbirds, which blended soul, funk and rock music, thanks to the work of the album's producer, Allen Toussaint. The proto-disco single, "Lady Marmalade", would become their biggest-selling single, going number one on the Billboard Hot 100 and selling over a million copies, as did Nightbirds, which later earned a RIAA gold award, for sales of a million units. "Lady Marmalade" was later inducted into the Grammy Hall of Fame. In October 1974, Labelle made history by becoming the first rock and roll vocal group to perform at the Metropolitan Opera House. Riding high on the success of "Lady Marmalade" and the Nightbirds album, Labelle made the cover of Rolling Stone in 1975.

Labelle released two more albums, Phoenix in 1975 and Chameleon in 1976. While both albums continued the group's critical success, none of the singles issued on those albums ever crossed over to the pop charts. By 1976, Patti, Nona, and Sarah began arguing over the group's musical direction. Personal difficulties came to a head during a show on December 16, 1976, in Baltimore where Hendryx went backstage and injured herself during a nervous breakdown. After the incident, LaBelle advised that the group separate.

== Solo career ==
=== Early solo career (1977–1984) ===
Following Labelle's split, she signed a solo contract with Epic and issued her self-titled debut album in 1977. The album included her composition, "You Are My Friend", which was only a modest R&B chart hit in 1978 but would become one of her early showstoppers in concert. Three more Epic releases followed in succession through 1980 (Tasty, It's Alright with Me, and Released), all of whom failed to generate a top 40 chart hit until her rendition of Peter Allen's "I Don't Go Shopping" reached the top 30 on the R&B charts in 1981.

That year, LaBelle's contract with Epic was reassigned to Philadelphia International Records where she recorded a notable version of "Over the Rainbow" on the album The Spirit's in It, which while not released as a single, became a signature staple in her live shows from then on. In 1982, she was featured on the Grover Washington duet "The Best Is Yet to Come", which became her first top 20 hit on the R&B charts in early 1983, and won LaBelle her first Grammy Award nomination. At the same time, LaBelle starred in the Broadway musical Your Arms Too Short to Box with God.

In October 1983, LaBelle's sixth solo album, I'm in Love Again, became her breakthrough recording, reaching the top five of the Top Black Albums chart and including her first top ten solo R&B hits, "Love, Need and Want You" and "If Only You Knew", the latter song becoming her first number one hit on the Hot Black Singles chart in January 1984, leading to the I'm in Love Again album being certified gold. She earned a third successive top ten R&B single with her duet with Bobby Womack, "Love Has Finally Come at Last" that same year and made her film debut as Big Mary in the film A Soldier's Story, co-writing two original songs for the film's soundtrack.

=== Crossover success (1984–2009) ===
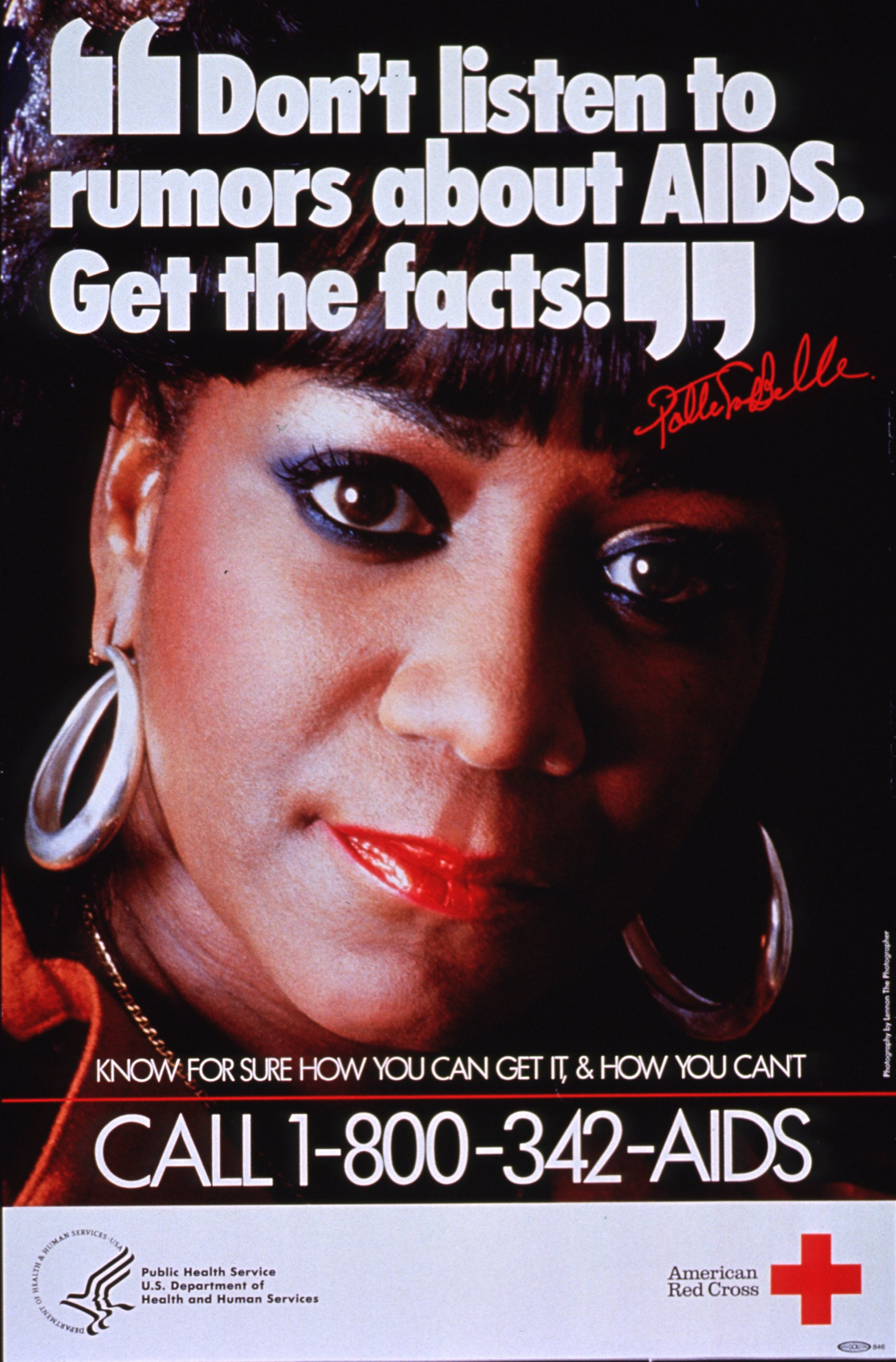
LaBelle promoting AIDS awareness in the 1980s

In late 1984, LaBelle recorded the songs "New Attitude" and "Stir It Up" for the soundtrack to the Eddie Murphy film, Beverly Hills Cop. Following the release of the film, "New Attitude" was released as a single in late 1984 and became LaBelle's first top 20 pop hit, peaking at number 17 on the Billboard Hot 100 in early 1985 and topped the Hot Dance Club Play chart, with the music video earning rotation on MTV. "Stir It Up" nearly repeated the success while both songs reached the top five of the Black Singles chart.

In 1985, LaBelle performed on the TV special, Motown Returns to Apollo and also as part of the all-star benefit concert, Live Aid. Her notoriety from performing on the two specials made her a pop star and national celebrity and later led to her starring in her own television special that same year. Also in 1985, a video of a performance from her tour of that year was issued on VHS. During this time, LaBelle ended her contractual obligations to Philadelphia International and signed with MCA Records.

LaBelle shared a stage with Gladys Knight and Dionne Warwick for the 1986 HBO special Sisters in the Name of Love. During the same year, LaBelle released the album Winner in You, which featured her biggest solo hit, "On My Own". The ballad topped the Billboard Hot 100 and was certified gold, leading to Winner in You topping the Billboard 200, her first and only number one album of her career. This was followed by Be Yourself (1989), which was a more moderate success and notable for including her original version of "If You Asked Me To", which reached the top 20 of the adult contemporary chart and was featured on the James Bond film, Licence to Kill. The song later became a top ten pop hit for Canadian singer Celine Dion. The year of its release, that August, LaBelle performed as the Acid Queen for The Who's second all-star concert celebrating the 20th anniversary of their rock-opera Tommy at the Universal Amphitheater in Los Angeles. Later that same year LaBelle began a successful stint in a recurring role on A Different World, the success of which spawned a brief sitcom of her own, titled Out All Night, which only lasted a season.

In 1991, she reunited with Knight and Warwick on a remake of Karyn White's "Superwoman" on Knight's solo album, Good Woman. The recording led to a Grammy nomination for the trio. That same year, LaBelle released the solo album, Burnin'. Featuring three top five hits on the R&B charts, the album went gold and won LaBelle her first Grammy Award for Best Female R&B Vocal Performance at the 1992 ceremony, sharing the win with singer Lisa Fischer, who won for her hit ballad, "How Can I Ease the Pain", in a rare tie.

Her next studio release, Gems (1994), featured the top ten R&B hit, "The Right Kinda Lover", and also was certified gold. On January 29, 1995, LaBelle performed at the Super Bowl XXIX halftime show, held at the Joe Robbie Stadium (which later became Hard Rock Stadium) in Miami with Tony Bennett, Arturo Sandoval and Miami Sound Machine. LaBelle released her best-selling memoir, Don't Block the Blessings, in 1996. In December of that year, LaBelle performed at the White House National Christmas Tree Lighting in Washington D.C., singing "This Christmas". The performance was famously shambolic, with LaBelle repeatedly asking where the backing vocalists were and berating a stagehand for holding the incorrect cue cards. Despite its subsequent notoriety and eventual internet virality, LaBelle later revealed on a 2017 Christmas episode of Watch What Happens Live with Andy Cohen that she had no recollection whatsoever of the performance. In 1997, she released the first of five bestselling cookbooks, as well as the album Flame. It included the dance hit "When You Talk About Love", and would be her fifth and final Gold-certified album. In 1998, she released the live album, Live! One Night Only, giving her a second Grammy win in February 1999. She was honored with the Triumphant Spirit Award for Career Achievement at the 1998 Essence Awards, featuring tributes from Michael Bolton, Mariah Carey, Whitney Houston, SWV, and Luther Vandross.

In 2000, LaBelle released her final MCA album, When a Woman Loves, before signing with Def Soul Classics to release the 2004 album, Timeless Journey. During the promotional run of the album, she headlined VH1 Divas for the first time, alongside artists like Debbie Harry and Jessica Simpson and good friends Knight and Cyndi Lauper. After the release of her 2005 covers album, Classic Moments, LaBelle was in a rivalry with Antonio "L.A." Reid over the direction of her career, leading to her leaving the label. That same year she collaborated with singer Olivia Newton-John on Newton-John's album Stronger Than Before.

In 2006, she released her first gospel album, The Gospel According to Patti LaBelle on the Bungalo label, reaching number one on Billboard's gospel chart. LaBelle also released the book, Patti's Pearls, during this period. In 2007, the World Music Awards recognized her years in the music business by awarding her the Legend Award. She returned to Def Jam in 2007 and released her second holiday album, Miss Patti's Christmas. In 2008, LaBelle briefly reunited with Nona Hendryx and Sarah Dash as Labelle on the group's first new album in more than 30 years, Back to Now.

=== Later career (2010–present) ===
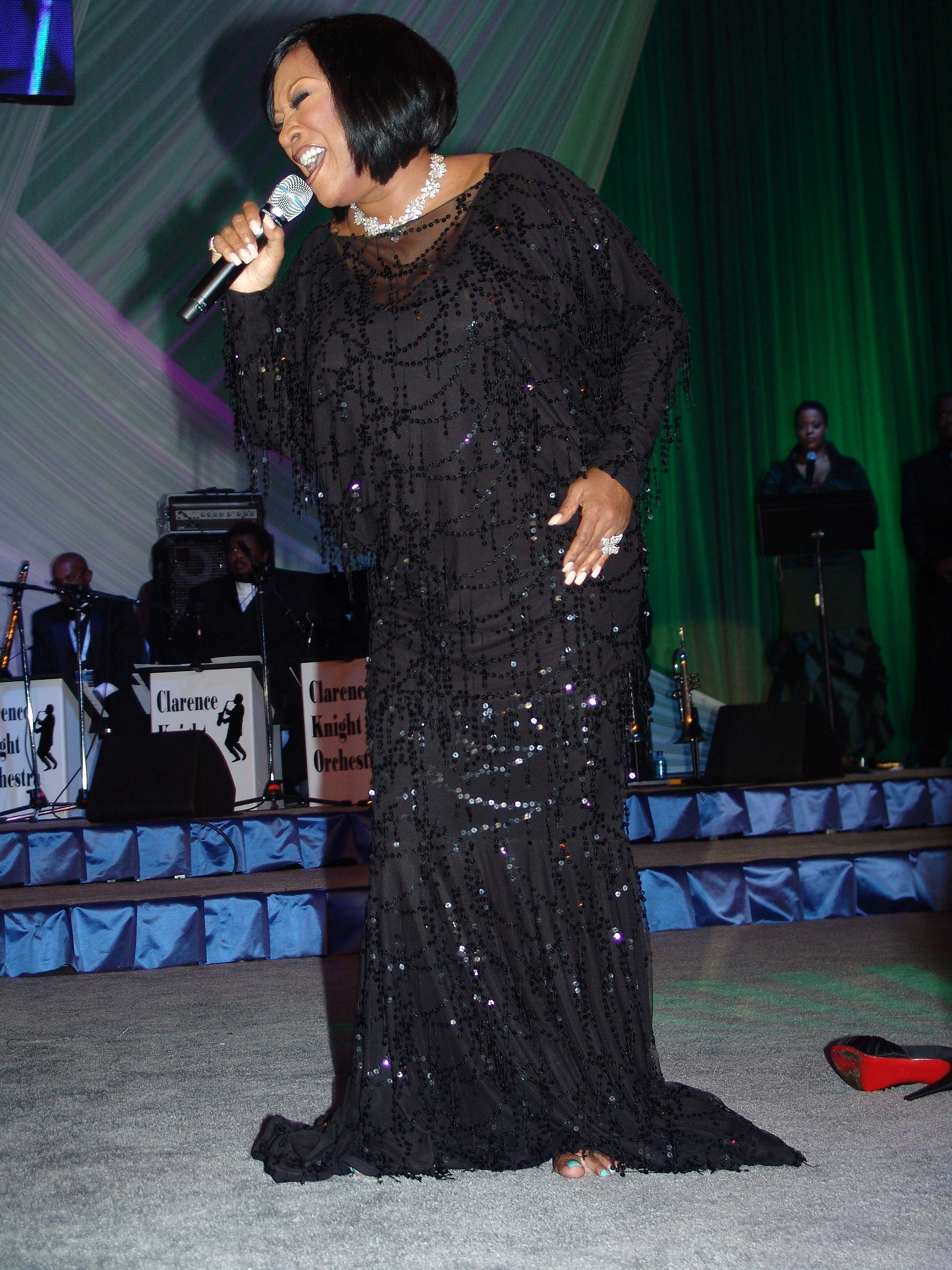
LaBelle singing at an Obama presidential campaign event in 2008

On September 14, 2010, LaBelle made a return two decades after her last Broadway performance to star in the award-winning musical Fela! about Afrobeat legend Fela Anikulapo-Kuti. She replaced Tony Award-nominee Lillias White as Fela's mother, Funmilayo Ransome-Kuti, and performed with the production through the end of its run on January 2, 2011.

On May 23, 2011, LaBelle appeared on "Oprah's Farewell Spectacular, Part 1" the first show in a series of three shows which was the finale of The Oprah Winfrey Show, singing "Over the Rainbow" with Josh Groban. She was honored with the Lifetime Achievement Award at the BET Awards on June 26, 2011. On January 2, 2012, LaBelle sang The Star Spangled Banner at the 2012 NHL Winter Classic at Citizens Bank Park in Philadelphia. LaBelle and Aretha Franklin, among others, performed at the "Women of Soul: In Performance at the White House" concert hosted by President Barack Obama at the White House, recorded on March 6, 2014.

On June 10, 2014, LaBelle returned to Broadway as the cast and creative team of the Tony Award-nominated smash hit Broadway musical After Midnight, welcomed her as "Special Guest Star". In 2014, she appeared in a guest role on the fourth season of the FX horror anthology television series American Horror Story which was subtitled Freak Show.

In 2015, LaBelle was one of the celebrities who competed on the 20th season of Dancing with the Stars. She partnered with professional dancer Artem Chigvintsev. The couple was eliminated on Week 6 and finished in eighth place. She has consistently toured the United States selling out shows in various markets. In 2012 and 2014 she appeared with Frankie Beverly & Maze on cross-country U.S. tours. In 2015 LaBelle made a guest appearance on Fox's television series Empire as herself.

She appeared as a "key advisor" for Christina Aguilera on the tenth season of the NBC series The Voice.

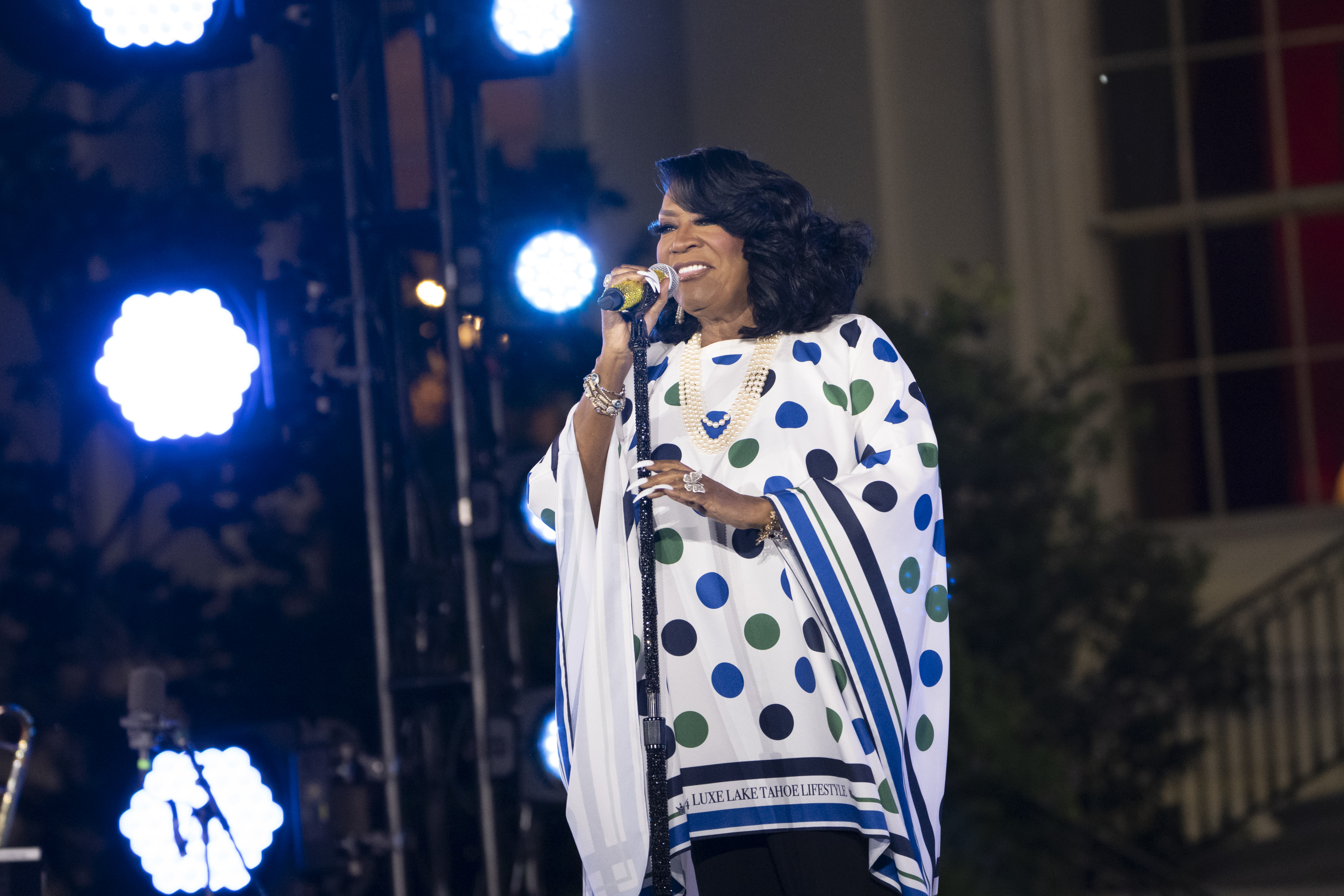
LaBelle sings in 2024.

She returned to the VH1 Divas stage in 2016, headlining a holiday-themed concert alongside Chaka Khan, Vanessa Williams, and her goddaughter Mariah Carey. Her first jazz album, Bel Hommage, was released in 2017. In 2018 she began appearing in recurring roles on the television series Daytime Divas, Greenleaf and Star.

On July 2, 2019, LaBelle was honored in Philadelphia with her very own street name Patti LaBelle Way between Locust and Spruce Street. On November 20 of the same year, LaBelle was revealed to have competed on the second season of The Masked Singer as "Flower". LaBelle continued her acting career with roles alongside Cedric the Entertainer on The Neighborhood and Dulé Hill on The Wonder Years. In September 2020 live from The Fillmore in Philadelphia, LaBelle participated in the American webcast series Verzuz, alongside longtime friend Gladys Knight with a surprise appearance by Dionne Warwick.

On December 10, 2022, LaBelle's Christmas concert in Milwaukee, Wisconsin, was disrupted when a bomb threat resulted in evacuation of the venue. While celebrating her 80th birthday in 2024, LaBelle revealed she was releasing a new album, 8065, celebrating her 80 years of life and 65 years in music. A few weeks later she announced a tour of the same name, kicking off on July 7 in Los Angeles.

== Charity work, foundations and activism ==
LaBelle has supported numerous charities and foundations. She is strongly committed to peace by promoting access to education, healthcare, housing, employment and equality of justice. She has served on several national boards as a devoted advocate for health causes, including diabetes, AIDS, Alzheimer's, and cancer.

In 1987, LaBelle became a spokesperson for the 'National Minority AIDS council' and promoted the "Live Long, Sugar" campaign to encourage people of color to seek treatment for AIDS. She used her influence to raise awareness around the AIDS crisis and the treatment of gay and lesbian community. She has been a vocal about her support for the LGBT community and has performed at numerous pride events.

== Personal life ==
LaBelle dropped out of Philadelphia's John Bartram High School just a semester before graduating in 1962. In her mid-thirties, she returned to the school and later earned her diploma.

LaBelle wrote that she was sexually assaulted by Jackie Wilson while at the Brevoort Theatre in Brooklyn in the 1960s. Around 1966, LaBelle was engaged to Otis Williams, founding member of The Temptations. The engagement lasted a year before LaBelle broke it off after fearing Williams would force her to move to Detroit and retire from the road.

On July 23, 1969, LaBelle married a longtime friend, Armstead Edwards, who was a schoolteacher. After LaBelle started her solo career, Edwards became her manager, a position he would remain in until 2000. That year, LaBelle and Edwards legally separated, with their divorce finalized in 2003. They have a son, Zuri Kye Edwards (born July 17, 1973), who is now her manager. After Zuri's birth, LaBelle suffered from postpartum depression for a year and said singer-songwriter Laura Nyro helped to take care of Zuri while LaBelle recovered. Through Zuri (whose name means "good" in Swahili), LaBelle is a grandmother of two girls and one boy. Edwards and LaBelle adopted two sons together, Dodd Stocker-Edwards and Stanley Stocker-Edwards.

LaBelle's mother Bertha died from diabetes in October 1978 at age 62. Her father, Henry Holte Jr., died of complications from emphysema and Alzheimer's disease in October 1989 at age 70.

All three of LaBelle's sisters died young. Her eldest sister, Vivian Hogan Rogers, died of lung cancer in October 1975 at 43. Seven years later, in October 1982, her elder sister Barbara Holte Purifoy died from complications of colon cancer at 40. In July 1989, three months before her father's death, LaBelle lost her youngest sister, Jacqueline "Jackie" Holte-Padgett, to brain cancer at 43. A day after she buried Padgett, an emotionally-wrecked LaBelle shot the music video to "If You Asked Me To" where she was seen crying in various shots; the video was shot on what would have been Padgett's 44th birthday. The singer dedicated her 1991 Burnin' album, and her famous rendition of the song "Wind Beneath My Wings" during her concert tour in 1991–92 to Padgett. After Padgett's death, LaBelle adopted her two children, William Holte and Stayce Holte.

LaBelle said that because of her sisters and parents dying "before their time", she wrote in her autobiography that she feared she would not make it to 50. Once she reached that age, however, the singer said she felt her life "had just begun". A year later, LaBelle was diagnosed with diabetes and later became a spokesperson for several organizations dedicated to fighting the disease.

She has a home in the Philadelphia suburb of Wynnewood and also has condos in Los Angeles and in Eleuthera, the Bahamas. LaBelle is an honorary member of the Alpha Kappa Alpha sorority.

== Civil suits ==
In 2010, LaBelle yelled at a woman and spilled water on her baby; that happened in the lobby of the Trump Place Apartments in Manhattan. LaBelle agreed to a settlement of $100,000 to avoid a trial. The family donated the award to a charity.

In June 2011, a West Point cadet filed a civil suit against LaBelle after he was allegedly assaulted by her bodyguards at George Bush Intercontinental Airport in Houston, Texas. LaBelle and her entourage were on their way to a gig in Louisiana when Richard King, a 23-year-old cadet on spring break, was waiting to be picked up in the ride-share area. King alleged that Labelle's entourage attacked him, causing a concussion. Labelle's entourage said that he had provoked the attack. King lost his court case after five days of testimony. King was suspended from the U.S. Military Academy. He sued LaBelle and Holmes for assault, seeking $1 million in civil court. LaBelle filed a counter-suit. Efrem Holmes, Labelle's bodyguard, was acquitted of misdemeanor assault on November 12, 2013, stemming from the incident.

== Influence ==
Patti LaBelle has been described as "the greatest gay icon of all time and a prime example of the intersection of the LGBT community and black female artists". In a 2017 interview, she said: "when I think about it, the gay fans are some of the reason—one big reason—I'm still standing, 'cause they loved me when other people tried not to. Everybody always says, "What makes gay men like you?" "I have no clue," I say. I still don't. But I know that love has lifted me up for many, many years." The New York Times called LaBelle one of three of "America's Most Beloved Divas" alongside Dolly Parton and Barbra Streisand.

LaBelle is the primary character on the popular web parody Got 2B Real. During the 2010s, her performance of "This Christmas" at the 1996 National Tree Lighting Ceremony broadcast live on C-SPAN began going viral annually during the holiday season due to LaBelle's reactions to technical difficulties and other performance challenges. The viral video is referenced in LaBelle's A Black Lady Sketch Show appearance, including the episode's title.

LaBelle made some headlines in late 2015 when James Wright (No Channel), a vlogger, spoke enthusiastically on YouTube of her brand of sweet potato pies. The video quickly went viral and for a time, one pie sold every second at Walmart, selling out at stores across the country. She has appeared in two Walmart commercials also an Old Spice commercial.

== Discography ==
Studio albums with Labelle

- Sweethearts of the Apollo (as The Blue Belles, 1963)
- Sleigh Bells, Jingle Bells and Blue Belles (as The Blue Belles, 1963)
- On Stage (as The Blue Belles, 1964)
- Over the Rainbow (as The Blue Belles, 1966)
- Dreamer (as The Blue Belles, 1967)
- Labelle (1971)
- Gonna Take a Miracle (with Laura Nyro, 1971)
- Moon Shadow (1972)
- Pressure Cookin' (1973)
- Nightbirds (1974)
- Phoenix (1975)
- Chameleon (1976)
- Back to Now (2008)

Solo studio albums

- Patti LaBelle (1977)
- Tasty (1978)
- It's Alright with Me (1979)
- Released (1980)
- The Spirit's in It (1981)
- I'm in Love Again (1983)
- Patti (1985)
- Winner in You (1986)
- Be Yourself (1989)
- This Christmas (1990)
- Burnin' (1991)
- Gems (1994)
- Flame (1997)
- When a Woman Loves (2000)
- Timeless Journey (2004)
- Classic Moments (2005)
- The Gospel According to Patti LaBelle (2006)
- Miss Patti's Christmas (2007)
- Bel Hommage (2017)

== Filmography ==
=== Film ===
Year	Title	Role	Notes
1984	A Soldier's Story	Big Mary	
1986	Unnatural Causes	Jeanette Thompson	TV movie
1989	Sing	Mrs. DeVere	
1989	Fire and Rain	Lucille Jacobson	TV movie
1990	Parker Kane	Cartier	TV movie
2001	Santa Baby	Melody Songbird (voice)	TV movie
2002	Sylvester: Mighty Real	Herself	Short
2005	Preaching to the Choir	Sister Jasmine	
2006	Idlewild	The Real Angel Davenport	
2006	Why I Wore Lipstick to My Mastectomy	Moneisha	TV movie
2007	Cover	Mrs. Persons	
2008	Semi-Pro	Mrs. Moon	
2012	Mama, I Want to Sing!	Sister Carrie	
2018	Christmas Everlasting	Mrs. Swinson	TV movie
2019	A Family Christmas Gift	Dora Douchon	TV movie
2022	A New Orleans Noel	Loretta Brown	TV movie

=== Television ===
Year	Title	Role	Notes
1982	American Playhouse	Cleaning Woman	Episode: "Working"
1983	Great Performances	Herself	Episode: "Ellington: The Music Lives On"
1987	Dolly	Herself	Episode: "Episode #1.4"
1987–2000	Sesame Street	Herself	Recurring Guest
1989	Showtime at the Apollo	Herself	Episode: "Episode #3.8"
1989–1995	Soul Train Music Awards	Herself/Co-Host	Main Co-Host
1990	Big Break	Herself	Episode: "Episode #1.12"
1990–1993	A Different World	Adele Wayne	Guest: Season 3 & 5, Recurring Cast: Season 4 & 6
1991	The Real Story of...	Miss Widow (voice)	Episode: "Spider Junior High"
1992	Out All Night	Chelsea Paige	Main Cast
1993	Essence Awards	Herself/Co-Host	Main Co-Host
1994	The Nanny	Herself	Episode: "I Don't Remember Mama"
1995	Great Performances	Herself	Episode: "Some Enchanted Evening: Celebrating Oscar Hammerstein II"
1995	The History of Rock 'n' Roll	Herself	Recurring Guest
1995	Showtime at the Apollo	Herself	Episode: "60th Anniversary Special"
1995	The Puzzle Place	Herself	Episode: "Deck the Halls"
1997	NAACP Image Awards	Herself/Co-Host	Main Co-Host
1997	Cosby	Charlene	Episode: "The Return of the Charlites"
1998	Soul Train Music Awards	Herself/Co-Host	Main Co-Host
1998	Soul Train Christmas Starfest	Herself/Host	Main Host
1998–2003	Intimate Portrait	Herself	Recurring Guest
1999	Sesame English	Herself	Episode: "Do You Like It?"
2000–2002	Hollywood Squares	Herself/Panelist	Recurring Guest
2001	Biography	Herself	Episode: "Patti LaBelle"
2001	Bravo Profiles	Herself	Episode: "RuPaul"
2001	Say It Loud: A Celebration of Black Music in America	Herself	Episode: "Express Yourself"
2001	Journeys in Black	Herself	Episode: "Patti LaBelle"
2001–2008	E! True Hollywood Story	Herself	Recurring Guest
2003	Blue's Clues	Backseat Boogie Singer	Episode: "Blue's Big Car Trip"
2004	Evening at Pops	Herself	Episode: "Keith Lockhart's 10th Anniversary Special"
2004	All of Us	Marvella James	Episode: "O Brother, Where Art Thou?"
2005	Extreme Makeover: Home Edition	Herself	Episode: "The Ginyard Family"
2005	Ballroom Bootcamp	Herself	Episode: "The Bodybuilder, the Nerd and the Tough Guy"
2006	Unique Whips	Herself	Episode: "Blazing a Trail to NASCAR"
2006	Hi-Jinks	Herself	Episode: "Patti LaBelle"
2007	Celebrity Duets	Herself	Episode: "Episode #1.6" & "#1.7"
2007	Real Life Divas	Herself	Episode: "Patti LaBelle"
2007	Clash of the Choirs	Herself/Judge	Main Judge
2008	Iron Chef America	Herself/ICA Judge	Episode: "Cora vs. Symon: Chocolate Holiday Battle"
2008	Living It Up with Patti LaBelle	Herself	Episode: "Holiday Special"
2010	VH1 Rock Docs	Herself	Episode: "Soul Train: The Hippest Trip in America"
2011	The Marriage Ref	Herself	Episode: "Bill Maher, Patti Labelle, Ali Wentworth"
2011	America's Got Talent	Herself	Episode: "Finale Results"
2011	Top Chef	Herself/Guest Judge	Episode: "Tribute Dinner"
2012	The Real Housewives of New Jersey	Herself	Episode: "Jersey Side Step"
2014	American Horror Story: Freak Show	Dora Brown	Recurring Cast: Season 4
2015	Dancing with the Stars	Herself/Contestant	Contestant: Season 20
2015	RuPaul's Drag Race	Herself	Episode: "Grand Finale"
2015	Oprah's Master Class	Herself	Episode: "Patti LaBelle"
2015	Empire	Herself	Episode: "Who I Am"
2015–2017	Patti LaBelle's Place	Herself/Host	Main Host
2016	The Voice	Herself/Advisor	Recurring Advisor: Season 10, Season 30
2016	The Chew	Herself/Guest Co-Host	Episode: "The Chew's Ultimate Shortcuts"
2017	Soundtracks: Songs That Defined History	Herself	Recurring Guest
2017	Daytime Divas	Gloria Thomas	Recurring Cast
2018	American Idol	Herself	Episode: "119 (Grand Finale)"
2018	Beat Bobby Flay	Herself/Guest Judge	Episode: "Food Star Face-Off"
2018	The Kominsky Method	Herself	Episode: "Chapter 2: An Agent Grieves"
2018	Greenleaf	Maxine Patterson	Recurring Cast: Season 3
2018–2019	Star	Christine Brown	Recurring Cast: Season 2-3
2019	A Black Lady Sketch Show	Herself	Episode: "Where Are My Background Singers?"
2019	The Masked Singer	Herself/Flower	Contestant: Season 2
2019	Live in Front of a Studio Audience	Herself	Episode: "All in the Family" & "Good Times"
2020	To Tell the Truth	Herself/Panelist	Episode: "Mark Duplass, Patti LaBelle, Kevin Nealon, Constance Zimmer"
2022	Soul of a Nation	Herself	Episode: "Sound of Freedom - A Juneteenth Celebration"
2022	Fraggle Rock: Back to the Rock	Merggle Queen (voice)	Episode: "The Merggle Moon Migration"
2022	The Neighborhood	Marilyn Butler	Episode: "Welcome to the Mama Drama"
2023	That's My Jam	Herself	Episode: "Billy Porter & Patti LaBelle vs. Darren Criss & Sarah Hyland"
2023	The Wonder Years	Shirley Williams	Recurring Cast: Season 2
2024	The Simpsons	Herself (voice)	Episode: "O C'mon All Ye Faithful (Part 2)"
2025	American Idol	Herself	Episode: "138 (Grand Finale)"
2025	Celebrity Family Feud	Herself	Episode: "The Arquettes vs Martha McBride and Patti LaBelle vs Fantasia"

=== Documentary ===
Year	Title	Notes
1979	Richard Pryor: Live in Concert	
1995	Queen: Champions of the World	

Year	Title	Role	Notes
2019	The Breakfast Club	Herself	"Ms. Patti LaBelle Graces The Breakfast Club To Talks Home Cooking, Haters + More"
2023	Drink Champs	Herself	"Patti LaBelle On Her Iconic Career, Aretha Franklin, Her Verzuz Battle & More"

== Awards and nominations ==
Honorary Doctorates

- Berklee College of Music (1996)
- Temple University (2010)

=== Emmy Awards ===
Emmy Awards
Year	Category	Work	Result	Ref.
1985	Outstanding Individual Performance in a Variety or Music Program	Motown Returns to the Apollo	Nominated	
1986	Outstanding Individual Performance in a Variety or Music Program	Sylvia Fine Kaye's Musical Comedy Tonight III	Nominated	

=== Grammy Awards ===
Grammy Awards
Year	Category	Work	Result
1984	Best Female R&B Vocal Performance	"The Best Is Yet to Come"	Nominated
1986	Best Female R&B Vocal Performance	"New Attitude"	Nominated
1987	Best Female R&B Vocal Performance	Winner in You	Nominated
1987	Best Pop Performance by a Duo or Group	"On My Own" (with Michael McDonald)	Nominated
1991	Best Female R&B Vocal Performance	"I Can't Complain"	Nominated
1992	Best R&B Performance by a Duo or Group with Vocals	"Superwoman" (with Gladys Knight & Dionne Warwick)	Nominated
1992	Best Female R&B Vocal Performance	Burnin'	Won
1994	Best Female R&B Vocal Performance	"All Right Now"	Nominated
1998	Best Female R&B Vocal Performance	"When You Talk About Love"	Nominated
1998	Best R&B Album	Flame	Nominated
1999	Best Traditional R&B Performance	Live! One Night Only	Won
2004	Best Traditional R&B Performance	"Way Up There"	Nominated
2003	Grammy Hall of Fame	"Lady Marmalade"	Inducted
2005	Best Traditional R&B Vocal Performance	"New Day"	Nominated

=== Image Awards ===
NAACP Image Awards
Year	Category	Work	Result
1986	Entertainer of the Year	Patti LaBelle	Won
1992	Entertainer of the Year	Patti LaBelle	Won
1996	Outstanding Performance – Variety Series/Special	The Essence Awards	Won
1998	Outstanding Performance – Variety Series/Special	Live! One Night Only	Won
2005	Outstanding Female Artist	Patti LaBelle	Nominated
2006	Outstanding Actress – Television, Movie, Miniseries or Dramatic Special	Why I Wore Lipstick to My Mastectomy	Won
2006	Outstanding Gospel Artist	Patti LaBelle	Won

=== Lifetime achievement awards ===
Year	Association	Category
1995	Soul Train 25th Anniversary Hall of Fame	Hall of Fame induction
1996	Soul Train Music Awards	Heritage Award – Career Achievement
1998	The Essence Awards	Triumphant Spirit Award – Career Achievement
2001	BET Walk of Fame	Walk of Fame Award
2001	Lady of Soul Awards	Lena Horne Lifetime Achievement Award
2003	Songwriter's Hall of Fame	Sammy Cahn Lifetime Achievement Award
2007	World Music Awards	Legend Award
2009	Apollo Theater	Legends Hall of Fame
2011	BET Awards	Lifetime Achievement Award
2013	Black Girls Rock	Living Legend Award
2016	BET Honors	Musical Arts Award
2022	Black Music & Entertainment Walk of Fame	Legacy

=== Others ===
Year	Association	Category	Work	Result
1993	American Music Awards	Favorite Soul/R&B Female Artist	Herself	Won
2007	GLAAD	Media Excellence Award	Herself	Honoree
2009	UNCF Evening of Stars	UNCF Award of Excellence	Herself	Honoree

== See also ==
- List of number-one dance hits (United States)
- List of artists who reached number one on the US Dance chart
