= Turn It Out (song) =

Single by Labelle
- Released: 1995
- Genre: House
- Label: MCA Records
- Songwriters: Shep Pettibone; Steve Feldman
- Producer: Shep Pettibone

Labelle singles chronology
| "Isn't It a Shame" (1976) | "Turn It Out" (1995) | "Roll Out" (2008) |

Music video
- "Turn It Out" on YouTube

"Turn it Out" is a song by American soul band Labelle, their first new music as a band in nearly twenty years. It was written by Shep Pettibone and Steve Feldman, and was recorded for the 1995 movie To Wong Foo, Thanks for Everything! Julie Newmar. "Turn it Out" was produced by Pettibone and went to number one on the US dance charts, where it stayed for one week.

== Track list ==
1. 1. "Turn It Out (The Bomb Mix)" remix, producer [additional] – Frankie Knuckles 9:46
2. 2. "Turn It Out (Miss Thing's Runway Dub") remix, producer [additional] – Frankie Knuckles 6:03
3. 3. "Turn It Out (Shep's Totally Turnt Out Twelve Inch Anthem Mix)" 10:26
4. 4. "Turn It Out (Shep's Totally Turnt dub)" 8:30

== Charts ==
| Chart (1995) | Peak position |
|---|---|
| US Dance Club Play (Billboard) | 1 |
| US Maxi-Singles Sales (Billboard) | 6 |

== See also ==
- List of number-one dance singles of 1995 (U.S.)
