= Back to Now =

Studio album by Labelle
- Released: October 21, 2008; April 20, 2009 (UK)
- Genre: Rock; soul; funk
- Length: 49:22
- Label: Verve, Universal
- Producer: Lenny Kravitz, Wyclef Jean, Gamble & Huff

Labelle chronology
Chameleon (1976)	Back to Now (2008)

Singles from Back to Now
- 1. "Roll Out" Released: November 18, 2008

Back to Now is the seventh studio album by American female vocal group Labelle, released on October 21, 2008 by Verve/Universal Records.

== Background ==
Back to Now was produced by Wyclef Jean, Gamble and Huff and Lenny Kravitz. This marked the group's first album in over thirty years. In an interview with Pete Lewis of Blues & Soul, Nona Hendryx revealed the album's title, "basically stem(s) from two of the songs on this album being songs I'd specifically written for what would have been the next Labelle album back in 1977. So the title 'Back To Now" is really signifying that this record represents us really getting back to where we were. It's basically a continuation from where we stopped off."

=== Covers ===
Labelle covered "The Truth Will Set You Free" by Mother's Finest and Cole Porter's, "Miss Otis Regrets" on the album. The album's iTunes edition also featured a rendition of Sylvester's "You Make Me Feel (Mighty Real)".

== Critical reception ==
Professional ratings
Review scores
Source	Rating
About.com	3/5 stars
Allmusic	3/5 stars
BBC Music	favorable
Baltimore Sun	3/5 stars
Entertainment Weekly	(B+)
The Miami Herald	3/5 stars
USA Today	3/5 stars
Robert Christgau	(choice cut)
Village Voice	(favorable)

Roshod D. Ollison of the Baltimore Sun, in a 3/5 star review noted, "Back to Now, in stores today, isn't the wild rock-soul-funk hybrid their classic '70s albums were. But that was another place and time. The new music and lyrics, most written by the sorely underrated Hendryx, echo the sentiments of wiser women who are still fierce...A few full-throttle dance cuts would have made the album even better. But beyond that, the women still possess the roof-raising voices that cemented their legend more than 30 years ago."

Laura Greenblatt of Entertainment Weekly, in a B+ review proclaimed, "Labelle opened for the Who, made a spectacular 1971 album with songwriter Laura Nyro (Gonna Take a Miracle), and produced some of the most sneakily ambitious funk music of their era. Now reunited after various solo outings, the ladies have turned out an admirably solid collection of midtempo soul burners with Back to Now."

Daryl Easlea of the BBC remarked, "This is a comeback album with its dignity completely intact. 33 years on since they split in 1976, Back To Now sounds infinitely better than had they recorded some over-produced disco confection in 1978. With help from Gamble and Huff and Lenny Kravitz, the formidable trio – Nona Hendryx, Sarh Dash and Patti Labelle – have created a memorable album...Back To Now is one of the best soul albums you'll hear all year, possibly this decade?".

Miles Marshall Lewis of the Village Voice proclaimed, "All praises due: Their first disc since 1976 ain't a Pharrell production with guest spots from Weezy and T-Pain. Instead, the trio called in old hands like Kenny Gamble, Leon Huff, and retro king Lenny Kravitz to do a surprisingly capable job re-creating the operatic gospel feel of classic albums like Nightbirds."

Thom Jurek of Allmusic, in a 3/5 star review, "Labelle's first offering since 1976's Chameleon could have been a stone disaster. It's not; in fact, it's far from it...Vocally, this trio hasn't slipped a notch – particularly Labelle. Indeed Back to Now exceeds expectations and will no doubt satisfy most fans of the trio's fantasies and hopefully – thanks to the ultra sleek "Rollout" – hook a few new ones to boot."

Howard Cohen of the Miami Herald, in a 3/5 star review wrote, "Back to Now, in stores today, isn't the wild rock-soul-funk hybrid their classic '70s albums were. But that was another place and time. The new music and lyrics, most written by the sorely underrated Hendryx, echo the sentiments of wiser women who are still fierce...There isn't an undeniable, instant hit here like Lady Marmalade but Back to Now is a timeless and welcome visit with three true originals."

Christian John Wikane of PopMatters also named Back to Now as 2008's No. 1 R&B album.

== Track listing ==
1. "Candlelight" (Nona Hendryx) 4:41
2. "Roll Out" (featuring Wyclef Jean) (Hendryx, Wyclef Jean, Jerry Duplessis, Patti LaBelle, Sarah Dash) 3:51
3. "Superlover" (Hendryx, LaBelle, Dash) 4:14
4. "System" (Hendryx) 5:32
5. "The Truth Will Set You Free" (Barry Borden, Michael Keck, Gary Moore, Joyce Kennedy, Jerry Seay, Glenn Murdock) 4:58
6. "Without You in My Life" (Hendryx, Dash, LaBelle, Kenneth Gamble) 5:29
7. "Tears for the World" (Gamble, LaBelle, Leon A. Huff) 4:33
8. "Dear Rosa" (Hendryx, Roni Morgan, Michael Waters) 6:47
9. "How Long" (Hendryx, LaBelle, Dash) 4:33
10. "Miss Otis Regrets" (Cole Porter) 4:39
11. "You Make Me Feel (Mighty Real)" (James Wirrick, Sylvester) (4:31) (iTunes Bonus Track)

== Charts ==
Back to Now debuted at number 45 on Billboard's album chart in the issue dated November 8, 2008. It also charted on R&B/Hip-Hop Albums, debuting at number 9. Back to Now is Labelle's seventh overall, and third highest-ranked album to chart in the United States.

Chart (2008)	Peak position
U.S. Billboard 200	45
U.S. Billboard Top R&B/Hip-Hop Albums	9
