= Isn't It a Shame =

Single by Labelle

from the album Chameleon
- Released: June 17, 1976
- Genre: R&B
- Length: 2:28
- Label: Epic Records
- Songwriter(s): Randy Edelman
- Producer(s): David Rubinson

"Isn't It a Shame" is a song by girl group Labelle from their sixth studio album Chameleon, released as a single in 1976 on Epic Records. "Isn't It a Shame" peaked at No. 18 on the US Billboard Hot Soul Songs chart.

== Covers & Samples ==
This tune was covered by Patti LaBelle on, Live in Washington, D.C., her 2008 live album.

Isn't It a Shame was later sampled on My Place by Nelly (Ft. Jaheim), Fake Love by Lil B, Catch Me by Monica.

== Critical reception ==
Christian John Wikane of PopMatters declared, "A stirring eight-minute ballad written by Randy Edelman, with exquisite piano work by Bud Ellison, it’s perhaps Labelle’s finest recording from the Epic era that’s dedicated to the lovelorn. The vocals are pristinely recorded with a sheen rounding out the rough edges of each singer’s voice, yet retaining the rawness of emotion: “Isn’t it a shame that such a love must end, whoa“. Whoa, indeed." Craig Lytle of Allmusic also called the tune, "breathtaking".

== Charts ==
Chart (1977)	Peak position
US Hot R&B/Hip-Hop Songs (Billboard)	18
