= Chameleon (Labelle album) =

Studio album by Labelle
- Released: June 17, 1976
- Recorded: Wally Heider Studios, San Francisco, California
- Genre: Funk; disco; doo-wop; hard rock; Latin
- Length: 50:12
- Label: Epic
- Producer: David Rubinson & Friends Inc., in association with Vicki Wickham

Labelle chronology
Phoenix (1975)	Chameleon (1976)	Back To Now (2008)

Singles from Chameleon
- 1. "Isn't It a Shame" Released: June 17, 1976

Chameleon is the sixth album by the American singing trio Labelle. Though Patti LaBelle's autobiography Don't Block The Blessings revealed that LaBelle planned a follow-up to Chameleon entitled Shaman, the album never materialized. The trio would not release another new recording until 2008's Back to Now. The final album was moderately successful peaking at #94 at the Pop charts and #21 on the R&B charts. Only two singles made the charts which were "Get You Somebody New" which peaked at #50 on the Pop charts and their memorable song "Isn't It A Shame" which peaked at #18 on the R&B charts. "Isn't It A Shame" was later sampled by Nelly on his 2004 hit, "My Place", which featured Jaheim.

== Critical reception ==
Professional ratings
Review scores
Source	Rating
AllMusic	3/5 stars
Christgau's Record Guide	B−
Rolling Stone	(favorable)

Christian John Wikane of PopMatters exclaimed, "With a new producer in tow — David Rubinson — Chameleon arrived in 1976. Like its namesake, the album emphasized the group’s mutability in a range of styles — doo wop, funk, Latin, hard rock — further confounding those who wanted to label Labelle. In just the wingspan of eight songs, Chameleon covered even more territory than its predecessors."

Craig Lytle of Allmusic, in a 3/5 star review remarked, "While Patti LaBelle was the vocal force behind the group bearing her name, Nona Hendryx was providing the material that Patti would use to deliver her energetic sound. Of the eight numbers presented, Hendryx is credited with six...On every level of creativity, LaBelle, the group, are as diverse as these selections."

== Track listing ==
All tracks composed by Nona Hendryx; except where indicated

1. "Get You Somebody New" (Joe Crane) (6:10)
2. "Come into My Life" (6:44)
3. "Isn't It a Shame" (Randy Edelman) (7:58)
4. "Who's Watching the Watcher?" (4:15)
5. "Chameleon" (5:15)
6. "Gypsy Moths" (5:00)
7. "A Man in a Trenchcoat (Voodoo)" (7:49)
8. "Going Down Makes Me Shiver" (7:07)

== Personnel ==
- Patti LaBelle, Nona Hendryx, Sarah Dash - vocals
- James Ellison - piano, keyboards, synthesizer
- David Rubinson, Tom Coster - synthesizer
- Eddie Martinez, Ray Parker Jr., Wah Wah Watson - guitar
- Carmine Rojas - bass guitar
- James Gadson - drums, percussion
- Scott Mathews - drums
- José Chepitó Áreas, Leon "Ndugu" Chancler - percussion
- Emilio Castillo, Lenny Pickett - tenor saxophone
- Stephen Kupka - baritone saxophone
- Kurt McGettrick - bass saxophone
- Fred Catero, David Rubinson - engineers

Basic song arrangements for Nona Hendryx material were: LaBelle, James "Budd" Ellison, Eddie Martinez and Rev. Batts
