= Down the Aisle (The Wedding Song) =

Single by Patti LaBelle And Her Blue Belles
- Released: 1963
- Recorded: 1963, Philadelphia, PA
- Genre: Blues; gospel
- Label: Cameo-Parkway Records
- Songwriter: Robert L Martin

"Down the Aisle (The Wedding Song)" is a doo-wop ballad recorded and released by girl group Patti LaBelle and the Bluebelles in 1963. The song became a hit success for the Philadelphia-based vocal group following the controversial release of their "debut hit", 1962's "I Sold My Heart to the Junkman".

== Background ==
By 1963, the controversy over the hit song, "I Sold My Heart to the Junkman", which was credited to the Bluebelles singing group but was rumored to be recorded by another group, had died down. Despite getting credit for "Junkman", the group failed to find a follow-up hit with songs such as "Go On" and "Cool Water". Finally, Newtown released their next single, which is dedicated to a wedding day.

The song is notable for lead singer Patti LaBelle singing in a high whistle register vocal near the end of the song while backed up by her lower-octave singing partners. The group recorded an alternate version that same year.

== Credits ==
- Lead vocal by Patti LaBelle
- Background vocals by the Bluebelles: Nona Hendryx, Sarah Dash and Cindy Birdsong

== Chart performance ==
Charts	Peak Position
U.S. Billboard Hot 100	37
U.S. Billboard R&B chart	14
U.S Cashbox Top 100	39
U.S Cashbox Top 50 R&B	8

The song was one of the first Bluebelles songs to be given massive play on both AM pop and rhythm and blues radio stations. The song later became a favorite for "blue night basement parties" and slow dances.

Year-end charts 1964	Rank
U.S. Cashbox Top R&B Records	40

== Popular culture ==
- The song is heard in the 1995 film, Stonewall
