= Pressure Cookin' =

Studio album by Labelle
- Released: August 7, 1973
- Recorded: 1973
- Studio: RCA Studio D, New York City
- Genre: R&B; jazz-funk; fusion
- Length: 40:05
- Label: RCA
- Producer: Vicki Wickham; and "friend" (Stevie Wonder) on "Goin' On a Holiday"

Labelle chronology
Moon Shadow (1972)	Pressure Cookin' (1973)	Nightbirds (1974)

Pressure Cookin' is the third album by American singing trio Labelle, released in August 1973. This release was their first and only for RCA Records, and was critically raved due to the songs that songwriter and member Nona Hendryx composed. The album is also notable for being the first album released following lead singer Patti LaBelle giving birth to her only child, son Zuri Edwards (she recorded the album while still pregnant with Zuri).

Among notable songs were "Something in the Air"/"The Revolution Will Not Be Televised", in which all three bandmates, Patti LaBelle, Nona Hendryx and Sarah Dash each shared a rap, the biographical "(Can I Speak to You Before You Go to) Hollywood", which was inspired by the events following former member Cindy Birdsong ditching the group during its Blue Belles tenure to join The Supremes and which featured all three members having notable lead vocal parts, mainly from Dash, while Hendryx sang in the beginning and Patti LaBelle sang the following verses, the soulful ballad "Last Dance" and the bossa nova-inspired "Let Me See You in the Light".

Despite RCA releasing the Stevie Wonder composition, "Open Up Your Heart", the album failed to become a success. In spite of its initial failure, the album has gone on to become a cult classic and is considered a revolutionary album because few female groups talked so openly about social issues and other topics. Wonder was uncredited due to contractual reasons - the production credit was listed as "Vicki Wickham and friend". Musicians on this track included members out of a Philadelphia-based band, Buff, and others from a Latin-black band from Queens called Harlem River Drive. Several of them would morph to become Labelle's road band, including guitarist, Eddie Martinez.

Professional ratings
Review scores
Source	Rating
Allmusic	link
Christgau's Record Guide	B

== Track listing ==
All songs written and composed by Nona Hendryx, except where noted.

=== Side A ===
1. "Pressure Cookin'" - 3:00
2. "Medley: Something in the Air/The Revolution Will Not Be Televised" (Speedy Keen/Gil-Scott Heron) - 5:50
3. "Sunshine (Woke Me Up This Morning)" - 3:18
4. "(Can I Speak Before You Go To) Hollywood" - 6:38

=== Side B ===
1. "Mr. Music Man" - 4:05
2. "Goin' On a Holiday" - 3:21
3. "Let Me See You in the Light" - 6:13
4. "Open Up Your Heart" (Stevie Wonder) - 3:25
5. "Last Dance" - 4:15

== Personnel ==
LaBelle

- Patti LaBelle - vocals
- Nona Hendryx - vocals
- Sarah Dash - vocals

Musicians

- Buzz Feiten, Eddie Martinez, Hank Redd - guitars
- Leroi Conley - guitars, percussion (congas, tambourine)
- Andre Lewis - organ, electric piano, clavinet, bass guitar, drums, percussion, arrangements
- Luther Eaddy - organ
- Carmine Rojas - bass guitar
- Larry Davis, Emry Thomas - drums
- Daniel Ben Zebulon - percussion

Technical

- Mike Moran, Tom Brown - recording engineers
- Roger Williams - artwork, design
- Bob Gruen - photography
