= Phoenix (Labelle album) =

Studio album by Labelle
- Released: August 19, 1975
- Recorded: 1975
- Genre: Funk
- Length: 40:49
- Label: Epic
- Producer: Allen Toussaint

Labelle chronology
| Nightbirds (1974) | Phoenix (1975) | Chameleon (1976) |

Professional ratings
Review scores
| Source | Rating |
|---|---|
| AllMusic | 3/5 stars |
| Christgau's Record Guide | C |
| PopMatters | (favourable) |

Phoenix is the fifth album by the American singing trio Labelle. The album was moderately successful, peaking at #44 on the pop charts and #10 on the R&B charts. Only one minor hit was released, "Messin With My Mind", written by Nona Hendryx.

== Track listing ==
All tracks composed by Nona Hendryx; except where indicated

Side A

1. "Phoenix (The Amazing Flight of a Lone Star)" (6:17)
2. "Slow Burn" (3:32)
3. "Black Holes in the Sky" (3:21)
4. "Good Intentions" (3:57)
5. "Far As We Felt Like Goin'" (2:58) (Bob Crewe, Kenny Nolan)

Side B

1. "Messin' with My Mind" (4:36)
2. "Chances Go Round" (Nona Hendryx, Edward Levone Batts, James Budd Ellison) (2:50)
3. "Cosmic Dancer" (5:49)
4. "Take the Night Off" (3:38)
5. "Action Time" (Edward Levone Batts, James Ellison; with additional lyrics by Nona Hendryx) (3:51)

== Charts ==
| Year | Album | Chart positions | | |
| Year | Album | US | US R&B | AUS |
|---|---|---|---|---|
| 1975/76 | Phoenix | 42 | 10 | 52 |

== Personnel ==
- Nona Hendryx, Patti LaBelle, Sarah Dash - vocals
- Edward Batts - guitar; acoustic guitar on tracks A5, B5
- Carmine Rojas - bass guitar on tracks A4, B1, B5
- James Ellison - keyboards
- Larry Davis - drums
- Jeffrey Shannon - percussion

with:

- George Porter Jr. - bass on tracks A1 to A3, A5, B2 to B4)
- Herman "Roscoe" Ernest III - drums
- Leo Nocentelli (tracks: A1, A2, A4, B1 to B5), Steve Hughes (tracks: A4, B1, B5), Teddy Royal (tracks: A2, A5) - guitar
- Allen Toussaint - Fender Rhodes, arrangements
- James Booker - organ
- Carl Blouin - baritone saxophone
- Jim Moore - tenor & alto saxophone, flute
- Lon Price - tenor saxophone
- Lester Caliste - trombone
- John Longo - trumpet
- Steve Howard - trumpet, flugelhorn
- Vicki Wickham - executive producer
- Don Puluse, Ken Laxton - engineers
- Tom Huetis - photography
