= What Can I Do for You? =

Single by Labelle

from the album Nightbirds
- B-side: "Nightbird"
- Released: April 1975
- Recorded: 1974
- Genre: Soul
- Length: 4:03
- Label: Epic; 50048
- Songwriter(s): Edward Batts, James R. Budd Ellison
- Producer(s): Allen Toussaint, Vicki Wickham

Labelle singles chronology
"Lady Marmalade" (1975)	"What Can I Do for You?" (1975)	"Messin' With My Mind" (1975)

"What Can I Do for You?" is a song by R&B girl group Labelle. It was released as the follow-up single to the number-one charting song, "Lady Marmalade", in 1975. It peaked at number 48 on the Billboard Hot 100, number 8 on the Billboard Hot Soul Singles chart, and number 10 on the Cashbox Top 100 R&B chart.

== Chart performance ==
Chart (1975)	Peak position
US Billboard Hot 100	48
US Hot Soul Singles (Billboard)	8
