= Moon Shadow (album) =

Studio album by Labelle
- Released: June 10, 1972
- Recorded: 1972
- Studio: The Record Plant, Los Angeles and NYC
- Genre: Soul; gospel
- Length: 39:26
- Label: Warner Bros.
- Producer: Jack Adams, Vicki Wickham

Labelle chronology
Labelle (1971)	Moon Shadow (1972)	Pressure Cookin' (1973)

Professional ratings
Review scores
Source	Rating
AllMusic	3/5 stars
Christgau's Record Guide	C

Moon Shadow is the second album by American singing trio Labelle. This release was their second and last album for Warner Bros. Records. The album is notable for their soulful rendition of The Who's "Won't Get Fooled Again", the socially conscious "I Believe That I've Finally Made It Home" (a song which members Patti LaBelle, Nona Hendryx and Sarah Dash share lead vocals) and the nine-minute title track in which Patti introduces all the musicians as they do their live solos. This is the first album where member Nona Hendryx begins taking over most of the songwriting.

== Track listing ==
All tracks written by Nona Hendryx except where noted.

Side A

1. "Won't Get Fooled Again" (Pete Townshend) (4:45)
2. "Sunday's News" (3:30)
3. "If I Can't Have You" (3:45)
4. "Ain't It Sad It's All Over" (3:30)
5. "Peace With Yourself" (Sarah Dash) (2:55)

Side B

1. "Moonshadow" (Cat Stevens) (9:24)
2. "Touch Me All Over" (3:25)
3. "I Believe That I've Finally Made It Home" (4:52)
4. "People Say They're Changing" (3:20)

== Personnel ==
Labelle

- Patti LaBelle – vocals
- Nona Hendryx – vocals
- Sarah Dash – vocals

Additional musicians

- Rick Marotta – drums, congas
- Leon Pendarvis, Maxayn Lewis, Michael Powell – piano
- Andre "Mandre" Lewis – organ, clavinet
- Marlo Henderson, Dick Frank, David Spinozza – guitar
- Russell George, Chuck Rainey – bass guitar
- Kenneth "Spider Webb" Rice – drums
- Maurice Saunders – congas
- Kenny Ascher – piano, clavinet
- Harold Vick – soprano saxophone (on #1)
- Buzzy Linhart – vibraphone (4)
- Larry Fallon – string arrangement (7)
