= Labelle (album) =

Studio album by Labelle
- Released: September 8, 1971
- Recorded: The Record Plant, New York City
- Genre: Soul
- Length: 39:03
- Label: Warner Bros.
- Producer: Kit Lambert, Vicki Wickham

Labelle chronology
Labelle (1971)	Moon Shadow (1972)

Professional ratings
Review scores
Source	Rating
Allmusic	3/5 stars
Christgau's Record Guide	C

Labelle is the debut studio album of American singing trio Labelle, formerly a four-girl group known as Patti LaBelle & The Bluebelles. This was Labelle's first release for Warner Bros. Records.

== Track listing ==
Side A

1. "Morning Much Better" (Aram Schefrin, Michael Zager) (4:00)
2. "You've Got a Friend" (Carole King) (4:16)
3. "Baby's Out of Sight" (Sarah Dash, Armstead Edwards) (2:35)
4. "Time & Love" (Laura Nyro) (3:45)
5. "Too Many Days" (Nona Hendryx) (2:57)

Side B

1. "Running Out of Fools/If You Gotta Make a Fool of Somebody" (Kay Rogers, Richard Ahlert/Rudy Clark) (4:15)
2. "Shades of Difference" (Nona Hendryx, Patti LaBelle) (3:14)
3. "Heart Be Still" (Bert Berns, Jerry Ragavoy) (3:14)
4. "Wild Horses" (Mick Jagger, Keith Richards) (3:03)
5. "Time" (Patti LaBelle, Armstead Edwards) (3:48)
6. "When the Sun Comes Shining Through (The Ladder)" (Mike d'Abo) (3:56)

== Personnel ==
Labelle

- Patti LaBelle - vocals
- Nona Hendryx - vocals
- Sarah Dash - vocals

with:

- Buzzy Linhart - rhythm guitar
- Kenny Ascher - piano
- Gene Casey - piano, musical director
- Judy Clay, The Sweet Inspirations - backing vocals
- Gene Cornish, Bob Mann, David Spinozza - guitar
- Marlo Henderson, Aram Schefrin - rhythm guitar
- Andre Lewis, John Taylor - organ, clavinet
- Don Payne, Bill Takas - bass guitar
- Jimmy Johnson, Luther Rix, Dave Williams - drums
- Ted Castleman - percussion
- Al Kooper - organ on "Time"

Technical

- Jack Adams - engineer
- Jack Douglas - assistant engineer
- Bob Gruen - cover photo
