= The Starlets =

American girl group

The Starlets were an American girl group from Chicago, Illinois.

The group came together in 1961, and auditioned for a Chicago songwriter, Bernice Williams. Williams wrote them the tune "Better Tell Him No", which was released on Pam Records that year. The record peaked at #38 on the Billboard Hot 100. The group then toured with Jackie Wilson, Mary Wells, and Gladys Knight & the Pips. The group's follow-up single, "My Last Cry", was less successful.

In December of that year, the group performed in Philadelphia, and while there, Newtown Records owner Harold Robinson had them record the song "I Sold My Heart to the Junkman". Newtown released the single under the name "The BlueBelles" in order to avoid contractual issues with Pam Records; as the song became a hit, Robinson assembled a local Philadelphia ensemble to lip-synch the song on television. Among this second group's members was Patti LaBelle. As "Junkman" itself became an even bigger hit than "Better Tell Him No", The Starlets sued Robinson, settling for $5,000 per member.

The Starlets then moved to Okeh Records, releasing one single, 1962's "You Belong to Me" (under the name "Dynetta and the Starlets"), and broke up shortly thereafter.

== Members ==
- Jane Hall
- Maxine Edwards
- Mickey McKinney
- Jeannette Miles
- Liz Walker (a.k.a. Dynetta Boone)
