= Labelle =

American music group

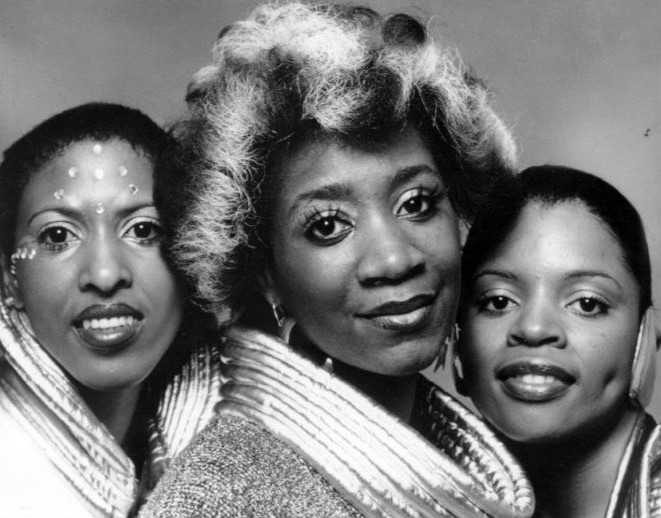
- Labelle in 1975. L-R: Nona Hendryx, Patti LaBelle, Sarah Dash.

Background information
- Also known as: Patti LaBelle and the Blue Belles; Patti LaBelle and Her Blue Belles
- Origin: Philadelphia, Pennsylvania, U.S.
- Genres: R&B; funk rock; progressive soul
- Years active: 1961–1976; 2005–2009
- Labels: Newtown; Cameo-Parkway; Atlantic; Warner Bros.; Epic
- Spinoff of: The Ordettes; The Del-Capris
- Past members: Patti LaBelle; Nona Hendryx; Sarah Dash; Cindy Birdsong

Labelle was an American band that originated out of The Blue Belles, a girl group who were a popular vocal group of the 1960s and 1970s. The original act was formed after the disbanding of two rival girl bands in the area around Philadelphia, in Pennsylvania, and Trenton, in New Jersey: The Ordettes and The Del-Capris, forming as a new version of the former, then later changing their name to The Blue Belles (and further Bluebelles). The founding members were Patti LaBelle (born Patricia Louise Holte), Cindy Birdsong, Nona Hendryx, and Sarah Dash.

As the Bluebelles, and later Patti LaBelle and the Bluebelles, the band found success with the ballads "Down the Aisle (The Wedding Song)", "You'll Never Walk Alone", and "Over the Rainbow" and as a consistent performing act, most notably at the Apollo Theater. After Birdsong departed to join The Supremes in 1967, the group, following the advice of Vicki Wickham, changed its look, musical direction, and style to re-form as the progressive soul act Labelle in 1971. Their recordings of that period became cult favorites for dealing with subjects not typically addressed by female black bands. After adapting glam rock and wearing outlandish space-age and glam costumes, the group found success with the proto-disco single "Lady Marmalade" in 1974, leading to the album Nightbirds achieving gold certification. They were the first contemporary pop and first black pop band to perform at the Metropolitan Opera House. They were also the first black vocal group to appear on the cover of Rolling Stone magazine.

Each of the band members later went on to begin solo careers after the end of a tour in 1976, going on to have significant solo success. Nona Hendryx followed an idiosyncratic muse into a solo career that often bordered on the avant-garde, but reaching a new audience with the respected 2017 release "Shine", by Soul Clap, which was widely played in the UK, US and Ibiza clubs while being picked and released by the famous label Defected Records; Sarah Dash became a celebrated session singer; and Patti LaBelle enjoyed a very successful Grammy-winning career, with several top-20 R&B hits between 1982 and 1997, a No. 1 pop hit with "On My Own", and lifetime-achievement awards from the Apollo Theatre, World Music Awards, and BET Awards.

The group reunited for their first new album in 32 years, Back to Now, in 2008. They performed together regularly until the death of Dash on September 20, 2021, at the age of 76.

== History ==
=== Origins ===
In 1960, 16-year-old Patricia "Patsy" Holte won her first talent contest at a Philadelphia high school. Following this, she sought to form her own singing group the following year called the Ordettes. Holte formed the group with singers Jean Brown, Yvonne Hogen and Johnnie Dawson. The group gained a local following. Dawson was eventually replaced by Sundray Tucker. By 1961, Jean Brown and Yvonne Hogan had ditched the group to get married, and Patti and Sundray carried on as soloists.

Later in 1961, Patti and Sundray's manager Bernard Montague contacted two singers from the Trenton, New Jersey singing group the Del-Capris, Nona Hendryx and Sarah Dash. Eventually Hendryx and Dash became official replacements for Brown and Hogan as the Ordettes. The group soon began working with musician Morris Bailey. Bailey and Montague's schedule led to Tucker leaving the group after which another singer, Cindy Birdsong, from Camden, New Jersey, joined the group. The grouping of Holte, Dash, Hendryx and Birdsong toured the Chitlin' Circuit, gaining a following in the eastern U.S.

In 1962, Chicago-based group The Starlets had traveled to Philadelphia to do sessions for producer Bobby Martin and record label owner Harold Robinson, president of Newtown Records. One of the sessions included a cover of the standard, "I Sold My Heart to the Junkman". At the time of the song's release, the group had a hit with the song "Better Tell Him No" and were unable to promote the song because they were signed to another label. The song was credited under the name "The Blue Belles". The Ordettes auditioned by singing the song. Before hearing the group, Robinson turned them down due to being unimpressed with Patti's looks but upon hearing her singing, he changed his mind and signed the group to Newtown.

When "I Sold My Heart" became popular, Robinson sent the Ordettes to promote it under the assumed name of the Blue Belles. After a televised performance at American Bandstand featuring the Ordettes, the Starlets' manager sued Harold Robinson and Bobby Martin. Around the same time, Robinson was also sued for having another group use the name "Blue Belles". Following the aftermath of the ordeals, Robinson gave Patti Holte a new name, "Patti LaBelle", and the group's name was rechristened as Patti LaBelle and The Blue Belles.

=== Sweethearts of the Apollo ===
Following several releases such as "Academy Award" and "Tear After Tear", the group recorded their first national hit under their new name in 1963 with the release of the ballad, "Down the Aisle (The Wedding Song)", first released under Newtown, before it received national distribution from King Records. The song peaked at number 34 on the Billboard Hot 100, launching the act into the national spotlight. An immediate follow-up of a R&B ballad rendition of "You'll Never Walk Alone" was released not long after their Newtown label was sold by Cameo-Parkaway Records. The song also reached the top 40 of the pop charts. A third charted song, a modern rendition of "Danny Boy", also made the Billboard Hot 100.

Frequent performances at the Apollo Theater helped to give the group the nickname "Sweethearts of the Apollo". They soon joined tours hosted by Murray the K and Dick Clark. A taped 1965 concert at the Brooklyn Fox Theater featured the group performing "You'll Never Walk Alone". That year, they opened for the Rolling Stones during a lengthy American tour. After Cameo-Parkway folded in 1965, the group was signed to Atlantic Records. Their first Atlantic single, "All or Nothing", made the Hot 100. They had a notable entry as background singers of Wilson Pickett's first major hit, "634-5789 (Soulsville, U.S.A.)".

In 1966, Atlantic released the group's first studio album, Over the Rainbow, which included "All or Nothing" and the title track, later to be a standard for Patti. Around this time, the group also began touring Europe, mainly in the UK, where they performed on the show, Ready, Steady, Go. During club performances, the group was backed up musically by a pub band called Bluesology, whose pianist was a teenager named Reg Dwight, later known as Elton John. Following the UK tour, the group kept in touch with one of the show's producers, Vicki Wickham. In early 1967, the group had another charted single with the song "Take Me for a Little While" and released their second Atlantic album, Dreamer. Around this time, Aretha Franklin had signed with Atlantic Records, leading Atlantic to focus its efforts on her rather than on the Blue Belles. That same year, Cindy Birdsong abruptly left the group to join The Supremes, replacing original member Florence Ballard. After completing a tour where Sundray Tucker briefly rejoined the group to fill in for Birdsong, the remaining members carried on as a trio.

As grittier soul and heavy rock dominated much of Atlantic's time, the group was let go from their contract in 1970. Bernard Montague, who was managing groups such as The Delfonics, also left them, leaving them seeking new managers. After nearly signing a contract with Herb Hamlett and Frankie Crocker, they eventually picked Vicki Wickham to work with them. Wickham later credited Dusty Springfield with convincing her to hire the group to perform on Ready, Steady, Go in London.

=== Reinvention ===
Wickham advised the group to move to London and change their entire image and sound, much to the chagrin of Patti LaBelle, who feared the group would alienate their older fans with a new laid back "earthier" look. Wickham also advised them to change their name to simply "Labelle". Ditching the wigs and dresses, Labelle settled on Afros and jeans. They debuted this new look while backing The Who during a stop in New York. Following this, Labelle signed a contract with Track Records, The Who's label, which received distribution from Warner Bros. Records. In 1971, the group released their first album, simply titled Labelle, quickly following it up with the 1972 album Moon Shadow. The albums featured the group bringing in gospel soul renditions of rock hits such as "Wild Horses" and "Won't Get Fooled Again". While not commercially successful, the albums were critically acclaimed and established the act as a progressive soul unit, recording more daring material such as "Morning Much Better" and "Touch Me All Over".

In 1971, Labelle were invited to record backing vocals to a covers album being recorded by Laura Nyro. The resulting album, Gonna Take a Miracle, led to the group reaching the charts for the first time and establishing a rapport with Nyro, who later invited them to perform with her at Carnegie Hall. In 1973, they recorded an album for RCA Records titled Pressure Cookin', featuring a wildly interpretive covers medley of the songs "Something in the Air" and "The Revolution Will Not Be Televised". It was around this time that Labelle changed up their act again. Under the advice of Larry LeGaspi, the group began performing in space suits, feathers, and studded costumes.

=== Success ===
In 1974, Wickham had the group signed to Epic Records where they recorded their breakthrough album, Nightbirds, in New Orleans with producer Allen Toussaint. While Hendryx eventually wrote the majority of the album, Epic released the Kenny Nolan and Bob Crewe composition "Lady Marmalade" as a single in August 1974. The song's rock-soul mixture helped the song to sell to listeners and by March 1975, the song had become the group's first number-one single, reaching the top of both the Billboard Hot 100 and the R&B singles chart. It also became an international hit. The album also included the follow-up hit "What Can I Do for You?".

Nightbirds eventually sold more than one million copies and was certified gold. During the album's promotion, the group became the first rock group to perform at the Metropolitan Opera House. Wickham billed the October 6, 1974 performance "Wear Something Silver", to adapt to Labelle's own silver-colored space outfits, worn by Patti LaBelle. Building on their success, in the spring of 1975, Labelle became the first African-American vocal group to make the cover of Rolling Stone. Later in 1975, the group released a critically acclaimed follow-up, Phoenix. That same year, the group contributed background vocals to several songs on Elton John's hit album, Rock of the Westies. In 1976, they released their third album for Epic, Chameleon, which included the tracks "Get You Somebody New", "Isn't It a Shame" and "Who's Watching the Watcher".

=== Breakup ===
Despite critical acclaim for their follow-ups to the Nightbirds album, Phoenix and Chameleon failed to repeat the success of Nightbirds as the group struggled to have another hit. By 1976, tensions had developed within the group, with the act's three members splintered on its sound and direction. Patti LaBelle had wanted the group to record more soul, Nona Hendryx wanted the group to go further into funk rock, and Sarah Dash wanted to record songs in a more disco direction.

During a show in Baltimore on December 3, 1976, Hendryx wandered off the stage and into the audience at the beginning of "(Can I Speak To You Before You Go To) Hollywood". Labelle's stage manager was able to steer Hendryx backstage, but Hendryx locked herself in her dressing room and beat her head against the wall until it began to bleed severely. She was removed from the theater in restraints.

After the incident, LaBelle advised the group to disband, fearing for the other members' well-being and that the mounting tension could also put an end to their friendship. Hendryx and Dash agreed and the trio formally announced their split at the end of 1976 after fourteen years together.

=== Solo careers and reunions ===
Following her departure from the Blue Belles, Cindy Birdsong enjoyed success as member of The Supremes, singing on hits such as "Up the Ladder to the Roof", "Stoned Love", "Nathan Jones" and "Floy Joy". Birdsong left the group in 1972 to start a family, returned in 1973, then left again in 1976, and thereafter only recorded sporadically as a solo artist in the 1980s, briefly joining the Former Ladies of the Supremes alongside former Supremes members Jean Terrell and Scherrie Payne.

The Labelle song "(Can I Speak to You Before You Go To) Hollywood", from Pressure Cookin', was allegedly written by Hendryx as a response to Birdsong's departure, featuring each member of the group singing verses. Sarah Dash found some solo success after signing with Don Kirshner's label, with the disco single "Sinner Man". Dash eventually sang backup for the Rolling Stones and sang for Keith Richards' spinoff group X-pensive Winos. The more experimental Nona Hendryx has recorded in various genres including hard rock, hip-hop, house and new age, and charting with the singles "Keep It Confidential" and "Why Should I Cry?". Patti LaBelle became an international solo superstar following Labelle's breakup, recording crossover hits such as "New Attitude", "Stir It Up" and "On My Own", resulting in Grammy wins and a star on the Hollywood Walk of Fame.

In 1991, Patti LaBelle reunited with Nona Hendryx and Sarah Dash on the track, "Release Yourself", from LaBelle's Grammy-winning album, Burnin'. The trio reunited onstage at the Apollo Theater in 1991 to perform the song on LaBelle's second concert performance video while promoting the release of Burnin'. In addition to "Release Yourself", Hendryx and LaBelle composed the gospel-flavored ballad "When You've Been Blessed (Feels Like Heaven)". In 1995, the trio reunited again for the dance single, "Turn it Out", for the soundtrack to the film To Wong Foo, Thanks for Everything! Julie Newmar. The song became their first charted hit in 19 years peaking at No. 1 on the Billboard dance singles chart. Four years later, the original Blue Belles (including Cindy Birdsong) reunited to receive an award from the R&B Foundation for Lifetime Achievement. In 2006, the trio of LaBelle, Dash and Hendrix briefly came together to record a Hendryx-written track called "Dear Rosa" for the soundtrack to a film called Preaching to the Choir. In 2008, Labelle announced their reunion and released their first studio album in 32 years, the critically acclaimed Back to Now.

That year, the trio went back on tour together which carried through the spring of 2009. In an interview with the Toronto Star, Patti LaBelle explained why she, Dash and Hendryx waited over 32 years to record a full-length album: "You don't want to half-step something this important....it was about finding the right time and place. We were never ones to do anything on anyone else's time anyway; we were always unconventional. I still have my glitter boots to prove it".

The group performed a triumphant show at the Apollo Theatre in New York City on December 19, 2008. They continued to perform with each other sporadically; Dash sang with Patti LaBelle at one of the latter's concert two days before her death on September 20, 2021.

== Legacy and influence ==
Years after their breakup in 1976, Labelle's influence has been reflected by groups such as En Vogue, Destiny's Child and The Pussycat Dolls, who recorded the Labelle hit, "Far As We Felt Like Goin'" from the Phoenix album. Their biggest hit, "Lady Marmalade" continues to be covered, with its successful covers being renditions by All Saints and the Grammy-winning number-one hit collaboration between singers Christina Aguilera, Pink and Mya and rapper Lil' Kim in 2001 (recorded for the Moulin Rouge! film soundtrack). The song was also covered by Madchester-era indie group The Happy Mondays, who spliced it with "Kinky Afro". The group's 1960s hit, "You'll Never Walk Alone", was covered by Sam Harris (who also covered their rendition of "Over the Rainbow"), and sampled by Kanye West in an early version of his song, "Homecoming" (which sampled the group's "walk on" intro), while their 1970s hit, "Isn't It a Shame" was sampled by Nelly on his song, "My Place". Their 1973 song, "Goin' On a Holiday", was also sampled in several hip-hop songs (sampling the group's vocal bridge, "goin', goin', goin', goin'...on...").

The group has been called pioneers of the disco movement for the proto-disco singles "Lady Marmalade" and "Messin' With My Mind". In turn, "Lady Marmalade" has been also called one of the first mainstream disco hits (Jones and Kantonen, 1999). In 2003, "Lady Marmalade" was inducted to the Grammy Hall of Fame. In 2009, their songs "It Took a Long Time" and "System" were featured in Lee Daniels' film Precious.

== Lineups ==
- Patti changed her name from Patricia Holte to Patti LaBelle in 1962 after Harold Robinson was sued by a manager of a group, also called the Blue Belles, therefore becoming Patti LaBelle and The Blue Belles.

== Discography ==
As The Blue Belles (aka Patti La Belle and Her Blue Belles; Patti LaBelle and The Bluebelles):

- You'll Never Walk Alone/Decatur Street 7" single (Parkway Records P-896, 1962)
- Tear After Tear/Go On (This is Goodbye) 7" single (Newtown Records NT-5007, 1962)
- Danny Boy/I Believe 7" single (Parkway Records P-935, 1962)
- Decatur Street/Academy Award 7" single (Newtown Records NT-5019, 1963)
- Sweethearts of the Apollo (Newtown Records, 1963)
- Sleigh Bells, Jingle Bells and Blue Belles (Newtown, 1963)
- On Stage (Cameo-Parkway, 1964)
- Over the Rainbow (Atlantic, 1966)
- Dreamer (Atlantic, 1967)

As Labelle:

- Labelle (Warner Bros. Records, 1971)
- Moon Shadow (Warner Bros. Records, 1972)
- Pressure Cookin' (RCA, 1973)
- Nightbirds (Epic, 1974)
- Phoenix (Epic, 1975)
- Chameleon (Epic, 1976)
- Back to Now (Verve, 2008)

With Laura Nyro

- Gonna Take a Miracle (Laura Nyro ft. Labelle) (Columbia, 1971)

== See also ==
- List of number-one hits (United States)
- List of artists who reached number one in the United States
- List of number-one dance hits (United States)
- List of artists who reached number one on the U.S. dance chart

== Other sources ==
- Jones, Alan and Kantonen, Jussi (1999) Saturday Night Forever: The Story of Disco. Chicago, Illinois: A Cappella Books. ISBN 1-55652-411-0.
- LaBelle, Patti, with Laura B. Randolph (1996). Don't Block the Blessings: Revelations of a Lifetime. New York, NY: Riverhead Books. ISBN 1-57322-039-6.
- VH1.com, "Labelle", by Steve Huey, Allmusic (accessed on June 29, 2008)
