= I Sold My Heart to the Junkman =

Single by The Basin Street Boys feat. Ormonde Wilson
- Released: 1946
- Recorded: 1946
- Genre: Rhythm and blues
- Label: Exclusive Records
- Songwriters: Leon René, as Jimmie Thomas

"I Sold My Heart to the Junkman" is a 1946 recording by The Basin Street Boys featuring Ormonde Wilson, written by Leon René, under the songwriting pseudonym of Jimmie Thomas. It was released on the Exclusive Records label in 1946. It was covered a year later by Etta Jones with J. C. Heard and his Orchestra and released on RCA Victor.

== Patti LaBelle and Her Blue Belles ==
In 1962, the Chicago-based girl group the Starlets were riding high with their top forty single, "Better Tell Him No". That year, while on tour, they were convinced by Newtown Records president Harold Robinson to appear in a recording studio where they recorded two songs. One of these songs was "I Sold My Heart to the Junkman". After recording the songs, Robinson released the song on his label but instead of crediting the Starlets, credited a Philadelphia-based girl group named The Ordettes, who had changed their name to the Blue Belles – after a threat from another record label owner, the name was altered to Patti LaBelle and Her Blue Belles.

=== Success ===
After the Blue Belles made their first television appearance on American Bandstand in April 1962, the popularity of the song increased and became a Top 20 hit on the Billboard Hot 100 and R&B charts.

Despite the controversy with the Starlets, the song became a 'million-selling' record as a result of the promotion done by Newtown Records and performances by the Blue Belles.

=== Aftermath ===
It is unknown as to whether Robinson erased the original lead vocal from the song and added in Patti LaBelle's lead vocal, or whether the Starlets themselves were replaced by session singers. Nevertheless, the Starlets' manager sued Robinson for ownership of the recording, with the girls each winning $5,000 from the suit. Despite this, however, it is still not clear as to how the record was released.

Ironically when the Blue Belles recorded their own version shortly before promoting it, both the Starlets and Blue Belles' versions were strikingly similar. The Starlets did not fully recover from the "Junkman" scandal and after a half-year of new recordings, disbanded in 1963. Meanwhile, the newly christened Patti LaBelle and the Blue Belles went on to national fame that year with their hit, "Down the Aisle (The Wedding Song)".

=== Chart performance ===
Charts (1962)	Peak position
U.S. Billboard Hot 100	15
U.S. R&B	13
U.S. Cashbox Top 100	16
U.S. Cashbox Top 50 R&B	6
U.S. Record World 100 Top Pops	22
U.S. Record World Top 50 R&B	4

== Other versions ==
Gene Ammons covered "I Sold My Heart to the Junkman" on his 1961 release, Up Tight!. In 1962, Lyn Cornell released her cover of the song with Jack Good's production. Despite gaining airplay on the BBC Light Programme, it did not match her earlier UK Singles Chart appearance with "Never on Sunday".
