= Vicki Wickham =

English talent manager, entertainment producer and songwriter (1939–2026)

- Born: 23 March 1939; Newbury, Berkshire, England
- Died: 31 July 2026 (aged 87); New York City, US
- Occupations: Talent manager, entertainment producer, songwriter
- Spouse: Nona Hendryx (m. 2011)

Vicki Heather Wickham OBE (23 March 1939 – 31 July 2026) was an English talent manager, entertainment producer and songwriter. She was the producer of Ready Steady Go! and later the manager of Labelle. She co-wrote the song "You Don't Have to Say You Love Me".

== Early life ==
Wickham was born on 23 March 1939 in the rural community of Newbury about 60 miles west of London, and was raised on a farm nearby in Inkpen. Her father was a farmer and her mother had been a nurse. She attended a boarding school in Berkshire. She then left for London, where over the next few years she had various jobs as an assistant children's book illustrator, a movie-theatre usher, a coffee-shop worker and an office cleaner. She then landed a job as assistant to the BBC radio producer Charles Chilton. In 1962 she was introduced to television producer Elkan Allan, who was creating a pilot episode of the programme Ready Steady Go! Allan hired Wickham as a secretary with the promise that if the show went forward she would be given a creative role.

== Career ==
Wickham became a producer and writer of Ready Steady Go!, and contributed to the short-lived Mod's Monthly magazine, first issued in March 1964 by Albert Hand Publications, and edited by Mark Burns.

In 1970 she moved to New York, where she helped establish and run the American office of Track Records. She became the manager of Patti LaBelle and the Blue Belles, who at Wickham's urging rebranded their trio in 1971 as Labelle. After Labelle broke up in 1976, Wickham managed the solo career of former trio member Nona Hendryx. She also managed the Canadian new wave band Rough Trade, and helped engineer a comeback for singer Dusty Springfield, who had spent years in and out of drug rehab.

She co-wrote (with Simon Napier-Bell) the English lyrics to Springfield's only British No. 1 hit, "You Don't Have to Say You Love Me", adapted from the Italian song "Io che non vivo senza te". With Penny Valentine, she co-wrote Dancing with Demons: The Authorised Biography of Dusty Springfield.

== Personal life and death ==
Wickham was gay, but said that her sexuality was never a problem, stating that she "wasn't out in the 60s. I didn't know what I was, really. Everyone knew I was gay, but we were so unpolitically conscious." In 2012 she told BBC Radio listeners: "I found somebody in 1970 and have been with her ever since. I wouldn't swap it for the world." Her partner of almost 60 years was the musician Nona Hendryx. They married in 2011.

Wickham died from Lewy body disease in the Bronx, New York City, on 31 July 2026, aged 87.

== Awards ==
Wickham was given a Music Industry "Woman of the Year Lifetime Achievement Award" in 1999, and was appointed an Officer of the Order of the British Empire (OBE) in the 2013 Queen's Birthday Honours List, for services to music.

== Bibliography ==
- Valentine, Penny; Wickham, Vicki (April 2000). Dancing with Demons: The Authorised Biography of Dusty Springfield. London: Hodder & Stoughton Ltd. p. 320. ISBN 9780340766736
