= The Jones Girls (album) =

Studio album by The Jones Girls
- Released: 1979
- Recorded: 1979
- Studio: Sigma Sound Studios (Philadelphia, Pennsylvania)
- Genre: Soul; Philadelphia soul
- Length: 35:10
- Label: Philadelphia International
- Producer: Kenny Gamble & Leon Huff; Dexter Wansel; Charles Simmons; Joseph Jefferson; McKinley Jackson

The Jones Girls chronology
The Jones Girls (1979)	At Peace with Woman (1980)

Professional ratings
Review scores
Source	Rating
Allmusic	3/5 stars

The Jones Girls is the self-titled debut album by American R&B vocal trio The Jones Girls. Released in 1979, it includes the million-selling single, "You Gonna Make Me Love Somebody Else", which charted at number five on the Soul Singles chart, number twelve on the Disco chart and number 38 on the Billboard Hot 100, the latter being their only major chart entry there during their career.

== Track listing ==
1. "This Feeling's Killing Me" (Charles B. Simmons, Joseph B. Jefferson, Richard Roebuck) - 3:30
2. "You Made Me Love You" (Dexter Wansel, Cynthia Biggs) - 4:53
3. "Show Love Today" (McKinley Jackson, Shirley Jones, Valorie Jones, Brenda Jones Frazier) - 3:52
4. "You Gonna Make Me Love Somebody Else" (Kenny Gamble, Leon Huff) - 5:17
5. "Life Goes On" (Kenny Gamble, Leon Huff) - 4:30
6. "Who Can I Run To" (Charles B. Simmons, Frank Alstin Jr, Richard Roebuck) - 3:25
7. "We're A Melody" (Dexter Wansel, Cynthia Biggs) - 5:25
8. "I'm At Your Mercy" (Kenny Gamble, Leon Huff) - 4:48

== Personnel ==
The Jones Girls

- Shirley Jones – lead vocals (2–4, 6–8), backing vocals
- Brenda Jones – lead vocals (1, 2, 5, 7), backing vocals
- Valorie Jones – lead vocals (2, 7), backing vocals

Musicians

- William Bloom – keyboards
- Bruce Hawes – keyboards
- Leon Huff – keyboards
- Joseph Jefferson – keyboards
- Dexter Wansel – keyboards, synthesizers, guitars, percussion, arrangements (2, 7)
- Roland Chambers – guitars
- Dennis Harris – guitars
- Ronnie James – guitars
- Darnell Jordan – guitars
- James Herb Smith – guitars
- Steve Green – bass
- James Williams – bass
- Quinton Joseph – drums
- Clifford "Pete" Rudd – drums
- Bob Conga – percussion
- David Cruse – percussion
- Miguel Fuentes – percussion
- Don Renaldo – strings, horns
- John L. Ursy Jr. – arrangements (1, 4, 6, 8)
- McKinley Jackson – arrangements (3)
- Jack Faith – arrangements (5)

=== Production ===
- Joseph Jefferson – producer (1, 6)
- Charles Simmons – producer (1, 6)
- Dexter Wansel – producer (2, 7)
- McKinley Jackson – producer (3)
- Kenny Gamble – producer (4, 5, 8)
- Leon Huff – producer (4, 5, 8)
- Jim Gallagher – engineer
- Carl Paruolo – engineer
- Arthur Stoppe – engineer
- Joseph Tarsia – engineer
- Wayne Wilfong – engineer
- Bill Dorman – assistant engineer
- Peter Humphreys – assistant engineer
- Rocky Schnaars – assistant engineer
- Michael Tarsia – assistant engineer
- Ed Lee – art direction
- Norman Seeff – photography

== Charts ==
Chart (1979)	Peak position
Billboard Pop Albums	50
Billboard Top Soul Albums	8

=== Singles ===
Year	Single	Chart positions		
Year	Single	U.S. Billboard Hot 100	US Soul	US Dance
1979	"We're A Melody"	-	78	-
1979	"You Gonna Make Me Love Somebody Else"	38	5	12
