= Get as Much Love as You Can =

Studio album by the Jones Girls
- Released: 1981
- Recorded: 1981
- Studios: Sigma (Philadelphia, Pennsylvania); Kendun (Burbank, California); Jennifudy (North Hollywood, California)
- Genres: Soul, Philadelphia soul, disco
- Length: 35:55
- Label: Philadelphia International
- Producers: Kenny Gamble; Leon Huff; Dexter Wansel; McKinley Jackson

The Jones Girls chronology
At Peace with Woman (1980)	Get as Much Love as You Can (1981)	On Target (1982)

Professional ratings
Review scores
Source	Rating
AllMusic	3/5 stars

Get as Much Love as You Can is the third album by the Jones Girls. Released in 1981, the album reached number twenty-five on the Top Soul Albums chart in the United States.

== Track listing ==
1. "(I Found) That Man of Mine" (Kenny Gamble, Leon Huff) - 4:11
2. "Get as Much Love as You Can" (Kenny Gamble, Leon Huff) - 4:23
3. "Nights Over Egypt" (Cynthia Biggs, Dexter Wansel) - 4:40
4. "Love Don't Ever Say Goodbye" (Cynthia Biggs, Dexter Wansel) - 4:38
5. "ASAP (As Soon as Possible)" (McKinley Jackson, Shirley Jones) - 4:16
6. "Let's Be Friends First (Then Lovers)" (McKinley Jackson, Shirley Jones) - 5:26
7. "The World Will Sing Our Song" (Phyllis St. James) - 4:05
8. "You're Breakin' My Heart" (Kenny Gamble, Leon Huff) - 4:16

== Personnel ==
The Jones Girls

- Brenda Jones – vocals
- Shirley Jones – vocals
- Valorie Jones – vocals

Musicians

- Leon Huff – acoustic piano (1)
- Lenny Pakula – organ (1, 2, 8)
- Dexter Wansel – keyboards (3, 4), synthesizers (3, 4), arrangements (3, 4), bass (4), drums (4)
- John Barnes – keyboards (5)
- McKinley Jackson – acoustic piano (5–7), arrangements (5, 6)
- Todd Cochran – synthesizers (5–7)
- Michael Nash – synthesizers (5)
- Ronald Coleman – keyboards (6, 7)
- Cecil Womack – guitars (1, 2, 8)
- Dennis Harris – guitars (3)
- Roy Smith – guitars (3)
- Marlo Henderson – guitars (5–7)
- Paul Jackson Jr. – guitars (5–7)
- James Williams – bass (1, 2, 8)
- Steve Green – sea bass (3)
- Nathan East – bass (5, 6)
- Freddie Washington – bass (7)
- Quinton Joseph – drums (1, 2, 8)
- Mark Dauberman – drums (3)
- Leon Ndugu Chancler – drums (5–7)
- Miguel Fuentes – percussion (4)
- Paulinho da Costa – percussion (5–7)
- Gary Coleman – bells (6, 7), marimba (6, 7)
- MFSB – horns (1–4, 8), strings (1–4, 8), acoustic piano (2)
- Jack Faith – flute (3)
- Grover Washington Jr. – soprano saxophone (4)
- George Bohanon – horns (5, 6)
- Walter File – harp (3, 4)
- Gayle Levant – harp (6, 7)
- Richie Rome – arrangerments (1, 2)
- Gene Page – arrangerments (7)
- Billy Page – string conductor (6, 7)

Production

- Kenny Gamble – executive producer, producer (1, 2, 8)
- Leon Huff – executive producer, producer (1, 2, 8)
- Dexter Wansel – producer (3, 4)
- McKinley Jackson – producer (5–7)
- Jim Gallagher – engineer
- Peter Humphreys – engineer
- Barney Perkins – engineer
- Joseph Tarsia – engineer
- Cecilia Perna – assistant engineer
- Mark Sackett – assistant engineer
- Michael Spitz – audio technician
- Michael Tarsia – audio technician
- Vincent Warsavage – audio technician
- John Wisner – audio technician
- Bob Titus – technical services consultant
- Nimitr Sarkananda – mastering at Frankford/Wayne Recording Labs (Philadelphia, Pennsylvania)
- Jean Scott – A&R coordinator
- Alan Weinberg – cover design
- Bobby Holland – photography
- Gary Taylor – photography assistant
- Lamar Joe White – hair stylist
- Tara Posey – make-up

== Charts ==
Chart (1981)	Peak position
Billboard Pop Albums	155
Billboard Top Soul Albums	25

=== Singles ===
Year	Single	Chart positions
Year	Single	US Soul
1981	"(I Found) That Man of Mine"	20
1982	"Nights Over Egypt"	23
