= At Peace with Woman =

Studio album by The Jones Girls
- Released: 1980
- Recorded: 1980
- Studio: Sigma Sound Studios (Philadelphia, Pennsylvania)
- Genre: Soul; Philadelphia soul
- Length: 36:51
- Label: Philadelphia International
- Producer: Kenny Gamble & Leon Huff; Dexter Wansel; Joel Bryant; Cynthia Biggs; James Herb Smith; Jack Faith

The Jones Girls chronology
| The Jones Girls (1979) | At Peace with Woman (1980) | Get as Much Love as You Can (1981) |

Professional ratings
Review scores
| Source | Rating |
|---|---|
| Allmusic | 4/5 stars |

At Peace with Woman is the second album by American R&B female trio the Jones Girls. Released in 1980, the album reached number seven on the Top Soul Albums chart.

== Track listing ==
1. "Children of the Night" (Linda Creed, Thom Bell) - 5:11
2. "Let's Celebrate (Sittin' on Top of the World)" (Cynthia Biggs, Dexter Wansel, Lou Rawls, Teddy Pendergrass) - 4:19
3. "Dance Turned into a Romance" (Kenny Gamble, Leon Huff) - 4:29
4. "I Close My Eyes" (Cynthia Biggs, Dexter Wansel) - 4:56
5. "At Peace With Woman" (James Herb Smith, Joel Bryant, Kenneth Gamble) - 4:31
6. "When I'm Gone" (Cynthia Biggs, Dexter Wansel) - 4:49
7. "I Just Love The Man" (Kenny Gamble, Leon Huff) - 4:40
8. "Back in the Day" (Kenny Gamble, Leon Huff) - 3:58

== Personnel ==
The Jones Girls

- Shirley Jones – lead vocals (1–3, 5–8), backing vocals
- Brenda Jones – lead vocals (1, 4–6), backing vocals
- Valorie Jones – lead vocals (1, 5, 6), backing vocals
- The Jones Girls – vocal arrangements

Musicians

- Dexter Wansel – keyboards (1, 2, 4, 6), synthesizers (1, 2, 4, 6), percussion (1, 6), arrangements (2, 4, 6)
- Leon Huff – keyboards (3, 7, 8)
- Joel Bryant – keyboards (5)
- John L. Usry Jr. – keyboards (7)
- Dennis Harris – guitars (1, 3, 5, 7, 8)
- James Herb Smith – guitars (1, 2, 5, 6), rhythm guitar (6)
- Marc Rubin – guitar solo (2)
- Derrick Graves – bass (1, 3)
- Steve Green – sea bass (2)
- James Williams – bass (3, 7, 8)
- Larry Moore – bass (5, 6)
- Quinton Joseph – drums (1–3, 5, 7, 8)
- Clifford "Pete" Rudd – drums (4, 6)
- Miguel Fuentes – percussion (2, 5, 6)
- Ralph Olsen – alto saxophone (2)
- Bob Malach – saxophones (2), sax solo (6)
- Al Harrison – trumpet (2)
- Don Renaldo – horns (1, 3, 7, 8), strings (1, 3, 4, 7, 8)
- Jack Faith – arrangements (1, 3, 5, 7, 8)

Handclaps on "Let's Celebrate"

- Joel Bryant, Diane Evans, Bill Lacy and James Herb Smith

=== Production ===
- Dexter Wansel – producer (1, 2, 4–6)
- Jack Faith – producer (1)
- Kenneth Gamble – producer (3, 5, 7, 8)
- Leon Huff – producer (3, 7, 8)
- Cynthia Biggs – producer (4)
- Joel Bryant – producer (5)
- James Herb Smith – producer (5)
- Jim Gallagher – engineer
- Peter Humphreys – engineer
- Kenny Present – engineer
- Arthur Stoppe – engineer
- Joseph Tarsia – engineer
- Bruce Bluestein – assistant engineer
- Mike Spitz – assistant engineer
- Nimitr Sarikanada – mastering at Frankford/Wayne Recording Labs (Philadelphia, Pennsylvania)
- Jean Scott – A&R coordinator
- Phyllis H. Berkowitz – design
- Ed Lee – design
- McGowan/Coder – photography
- Profils Dumonde – wardrobe

== Charts ==
| Chart (1980) | Peak position |
|---|---|
| Billboard Pop Albums | 96 |
| Billboard Top Soul Albums | 7 |

=== Singles ===
| Year | Single | Chart positions |
| Year | Single | US Soul |
|---|---|---|
| 1980 | "Dance Turned into A Romance" | 22 |
| 1980 | "I Just Love The Man" | 9 |
