= Patti (album) =

Studio album by Patti LaBelle
- Released: July 3, 1985
- Studio: Sigma Sound Studios (Philadelphia, Pennsylvania); Track 8 recorded live at Constitution Hall (Washington, D.C.). Remote unit provided by Fanta Sound Studios (Nashville, Tennessee)
- Genre: Funk; soul
- Length: 38:01
- Label: Philadelphia International
- Producer: Kenny Gamble; Reggie Griffin; Leon Huff; Joseph Jefferson; Bunny Sigler; James Sigler; Dexter Wansel; Cecil Womack

Patti LaBelle chronology
I'm in Love Again (1983)	Patti (1985)	Winner in You (1986)

Professional ratings
Review scores
Source	Rating
AllMusic	3/5 stars

Patti is the seventh studio album released by American singer Patti LaBelle. It was released by Philadelphia International Records on July 3, 1985, in the United States.

== Background ==
After seven years of modest success, Patti LaBelle finally became a mainstream solo star following the late 1983 release of the album, I'm in Love Again, and its hit singles, "If Only You Knew" and "Love, Need and Want You" and the 1984 soundtrack singles "New Attitude" and "Stir It Up", the latter two were featured on the soundtrack to the Eddie Murphy film, Beverly Hills Cop, and launched LaBelle into pop stardom. By July of the year, LaBelle received new attention by being a standout performer on that month's Live Aid concert in her hometown of Philadelphia. In December 1984, LaBelle signed a new contract with MCA Records and began work on her first MCA album, Winner in You. In the interim, Philadelphia International was left with a bunch of leftover LaBelle recordings culled from 1983–1984 recording sessions, including a live cover of "If You Don't Know Me By Now" by Harold Melvin & The Blue Notes.

The album included "Look to the Rainbow", which became the name of her live concert video culled from a 1985 show in New York, and the aforementioned cover of "If You Don't Know Me By Now", which, along with the R&B ballad "I Can't Forget You", hit the R&B charts. "If You Don't Know Me By Now" became a concert staple for LaBelle following the album's release. LaBelle's last contractual album with Philadelphia International, it was also her last album under a CBS-recorded label after an 11-year association. In addition, it was also the last PIR album to be distributed under the original deal with CBS Records before the label switched distribution to Manhattan Records.

== Track listing ==
Patti track listing
No.	Title	Writer(s)	Producer(s)	Length
1.	"Love Symphony"	Linda Womack; Cecil Womack	Cecil Womack; Reggie Griffin	3:36
2.	"Living Double"	Bunny Sigler; James Sigler	Bunny Sigler; Kenny Gamble; Griffin	4:20
3.	"Where I Wanna Be"	Cecil Womack; Gamble	Cecil Womack; Gamble	4:16
4.	"Shy"	Bunny Sigler; Gamble	Bunny Sigler; Gamble; Griffin	4:26
5.	"Look to the Rainbow"	Burton Lane; E.Y. "Yip" Harburg	James Sigler; Gamble	4:31
6.	"I Can't Forget You"	James Herbert Smith; Terri Wells	Dexter Wansel	4:34
7.	"What Can I Do for You"	Charles Simmons; Richard Roebuck; Joseph Jefferson	Jefferson	4:14
8.	"If You Don't Know Me by Now" (live)	Gamble; Leon Huff	Gamble & Huff	8:09
Total length:				38:01

== Personnel ==
Performers and musicians

- Patti LaBelle – vocals, backing vocals (6)
- Cecil Du Valle – keyboards (1), synthesizers (1)
- Leon Huff – keyboards (1)
- Reggie Griffin – synthesizers (1, 2, 4), guitars (1), drum programming (2, 4), arrangements (2, 4), Minimoog (4), keyboards (4), bass (4)
- James Sigler – keyboards (2), synthesizers (2, 4), arrangements (2, 4, 5)
- William Jolly – keyboards (3), synthesizers (3), backing vocals (3), arrangements (3)
- Joel Bryant – acoustic piano (3)
- Lenny Pakula – organ (3)
- Bunny Sigler – keyboards (4)
- James "Budd" Ellison – acoustic piano (5), keyboards (8), arrangements (8), musical director (8), orchestra conductor (8)
- Philip Woo – acoustic piano (5), keyboards (8), synthesizers (8)
- Dexter Wansel – keyboards (6), arrangements (6)
- Joseph Jefferson – keyboards (7), arrangements (7)
- Herb Smith – guitars (1, 5, 6, 8), backing vocals (6, 8)
- Cecil Womack – guitars (1, 3), arrangements (1, 3)
- Dennis Harris – guitars (2, 4, 7)
- Jimmy Williams – bass (1–3, 5, 7)
- Steve Green – bass (6)
- Darryl Jones – bass (8)
- Quinton Joseph – drums (1–3)
- John Ingram – drums (5, 8), backing vocals (8)
- Charles Collins – drums (7)
- Clifford "Pete" Rudd – drums (6)
- Miguel Fuentes – percussion (6)
- Don Renaldo – horns and strings (2–4, 6)
- Sam Peake – saxophone (7), sax solo (8)
- Andrea Jackson – backing vocals (3)
- Donna Natson – backing vocals (3)
- Veronica Underwood – backing vocals (3)
- Cynthia Biggs – backing vocals (6)
- Terri Wells – backing vocals (6)
- Edward Batts – backing vocals (8)

Technical

- Kenny Gamble – executive producer
- Leon Huff – executive producer
- Peter Humphreys – engineer
- King Shameek – engineer
- Arthur Stoppe – engineer
- Joseph Tarsia – engineer
- Randy Abrams – assistant engineer
- Tom Caine – assistant engineer
- Marin Conaty – assistant engineer
- Scott MacMillan – assistant engineer
- Glenn McKee – assistant engineer
- Adam Silverman – assistant engineer
- Vince Warsavage – assistant engineer
- Frankford/Wayne Recording Labs (Philadelphia, Pennsylvania) – mastering location
- Stephen Byram – art direction
- Diane Best – illustration

== Charts ==
Chart performance for Patti
Chart (1985)	Peak position
US Billboard 200	72
US Top R&B/Hip-Hop Albums (Billboard)	13
US R&B Albums (Cashbox)	7
US Top 100 Albums (Cashbox)	52
