= The Spirit's in It =

Studio album by Patti LaBelle
- Released: August 28, 1981
- Studios: Sigma Sound Studios (Philadelphia, Pennsylvania)
- Length: 35:44
- Labels: Philadelphia International; CBS
- Producers: Kenny Gamble; Leon Huff; James "Budd" Ellison; Cynthia Biggs; Dexter Wansel; Cecil Womack

Patti LaBelle chronology
Released (1980)	The Spirit's in It (1981)	I'm in Love Again (1983)

Professional ratings
Review scores
Source	Rating
AllMusic	3/5 stars

The Spirit's in It is the fifth studio album by American singer Patti LaBelle. It was released by Philadelphia International Records on August 28, 1981, in the United States, her first with the label.

== Background ==
Patti LaBelle embarked on a solo career in 1977, shortly after the split of the girl group Labelle. Her first solo album, a self-titled affair, was critically acclaimed and also found commercial success. However, her three follow-ups for Epic failed to match that album's momentum, despite some charted singles. When her fourth album, Released, failed to generate a significant R&B or pop hit, she agreed to sign with Philadelphia International Records, which had been known to provide hits for veteran artists such as The O'Jays, Lou Rawls and Billy Paul.

With the help of Kenny Gamble and Leon Huff, her frequent collaborator James Ellison and PIR staff producers such as Dexter Wansel and Cecil Womack, LaBelle produced The Spirit's in It, which included her forays into other genres such as country, rock and reggae. Among the notable singles from the album included her cover of the boogie-woogie hit, "Rocking Pneumonia and the Boogie-Woogie Flu", the club hit title track, "Family", "Shoot Him on Sight" (her first collaboration with songwriters Cynthia Biggs and Dexter Wansel) and "Over the Rainbow", the latter track becoming her solo cover of a tune she had previously recorded as member of Patti LaBelle and the Blue Belles in the sixties. LaBelle had been performing the song in concert after embarking on her solo career. The new recording was listed as the b-side of the single "Family" and became a standout in LaBelle's career, quickly becoming a signature song for LaBelle. This album would precede her commercial breakthrough a couple years later with the album, I'm in Love Again.

== Track listing ==
The Spirit's in It track listing
No.	Title	Writer(s)	Producer(s)	Length
1.	"The Spirit's in It"	Cecil Womack; Kenneth Gamble	Womack; Gamble	5:50
2.	"Here You Come Again"	Barry Mann; Cynthia Weil	James "Budd" Ellison; Gamble	3:02
3.	"Love Lives"	Womack; Leon Huff	Gamble & Huff	2:52
4.	"I Fell in Love Without Warning"	Huff	Huff	3:12
5.	"Boats Against the Current"	Eric Carmen	Ellison; Gamble	4:04
6.	"Rockin' Pneumonia and the Boogie Woogie Flu"	Huey "Piano" Smith	Huff	4:25
7.	"Family"	J.H. Smith	Ellison; Gamble	4:22
8.	"Shoot Him on Sight"	Cynthia Biggs; Dexter Wansel	Biggs; Wansel	5:31
9.	"Over the Rainbow"	E.Y. "Yip" Harburg; Harold Arlen	Ellison; Gamble	3:46
Total length:				35:44

== Personnel ==
Performers and musicians

- Patti LaBelle – lead vocals, backing vocals (1, 2, 4–9)
- Joel Bryant – keyboards (1)
- Lenny Pakula – organ (1, 3, 4)
- James "Budd" Ellison – keyboards (2, 5, 7, 9), backing vocals (5, 7)
- Philip Woo – keyboards (2, 9)
- Leon A. Huff – acoustic piano (3, 4, 6), Fender Rhodes (3, 4), backing vocals (6)
- Nathaniel Wilkie – keyboards (5, 7), acoustic piano (5, 7), organ (5, 7), synthesizers (5, 7)
- Cynthia Biggs – acoustic piano (8)
- Dexter Wansel – synthesizers (8)
- Dennis Harris – guitars (1)
- Cecil Womack – guitars (1, 3, 4, 6), backing vocals (6)
- Edward Levon Batts – guitars (2, 9), backing vocals (2, 7)
- Herb Smith – guitars (2, 5, 7–9), backing vocals (5, 7, 9)
- Bobby Bennett – acoustic guitar (6)
- Marc Rubin – guitars (8)
- Roy Smith – guitars (8)
- Jimmy Williams – bass guitar (1–5, 9)
- Derrick Graves – bass guitar (6)
- Idress "Skeets" Young – bass guitar (8)
- Quinton Joseph – drums (1, 3, 4, 6)
- John Ingram – drums (5, 7, 9), backing vocals (5, 7, 9)
- Clifford "Pete" Rudd – drums (8)
- Vincent Montana Jr. – orchestral bells (3), vibraphone (3)
- Miguel Fuentes – percussion (5, 7, 8)
- Michael Mee – alto saxophone (1)
- Ralph Olson – alto saxophone (1)
- Bob Malach – tenor saxophone (1)
- Michael Pedicin Jr. – tenor saxophone (1)
- Willie Williams – soprano saxophone (5), tenor saxophone (5)
- Sam Peake – saxophone (9)
- Larry Gittins – trumpet (1)
- Bobby Rush – harmonica (6)
- MFSB – horns (2, 8, 9), strings (2, 3, 8, 9)
- Carl Helm – backing vocals (2, 7, 9)
- Reggie Workman – backing vocals (2, 9)
- Kenneth Gamble – backing vocals (5, 7)

Handclaps on "Family"

- Miguel Fuentes
- Stacey Todd Holt
- Norman Maxon
- Fred Murphy
- Vivian Reed
- Idress "Skeets" Young

Arrangements

- Dexter Wansel – arrangements (1, 8)
- James "Budd" Ellison – arrangements (2, 5, 7, 9)
- Jack Faith – arrangements (3)
- Leon A. Huff – arrangements (3, 4, 6), BGV arrangements (6)

Technical

- Kenneth Gamble – executive producer
- Leon A. Huff – executive producer
- Dirk Devlin – engineer
- Arthur Stoppe – engineer
- Joseph Tarsia – engineer
- Michael Tarsia – assistant engineer
- Vince Warsavage – assistant engineer
- Frankford/Wayne Mastering Labs (Philadelphia, Pennsylvania) – mastering location
- Jean Scott – A&R coordinator
- Paula Scher – design
- Rebecca Blake – photography
- Patti LaBelle – fashion coordinator
- Shelly Tyrer Broomfield – fashion stylist
- Don Kline – fashion stylist, wardrobe
- Adrian Landau – fashion stylist, wardrobe
- Charles Marks – fashion stylist, wardrobe
- David Peters – fashion stylist, wardrobe
- Lisandra Sarasota – wardrobe
- Maud Frizon – shoes
- Norma Harris – hair stylist
- Thomas Staffile – limousine service

== Charts ==
Chart performance for The Spirit's in It
Chart (1981)	Peak position
US Billboard 200	156
US Top R&B/Hip-Hop Albums (Billboard)	43
US World R&B LP (Record World)	28
US World Albums (Record World)	62
US Top 100 Albums (Cashbox)	98
US Top 75 R&B Albums (Cashbox)	36
