= Imagine This (album) =

Studio album by Pieces of a Dream
- Released: August 8, 1983
- Studio: Sigma Sound, Philadelphia, Pennsylvania
- Genre: Jazz
- Length: 37:16
- Label: Elektra
- Producer: Grover Washington, Jr.

Pieces of a Dream chronology
We Are One (1982)	Imagine This (1983)	Joyride (1986)

Professional ratings
Review scores
Source	Rating
AllMusic	3.5/5 stars

Imagine This is the third album by the jazz ensemble Pieces of a Dream, issued in 1983 on Elektra Records. The album rose to No. 4 on the Billboard Traditional Jazz Albums chart and No. 16 on the Billboard Top Soul Albums chart.

== Overview ==
Imagine This was produced by Grover Washington Jr.

=== Singles ===
"Fo-Fi-Fo" reached No. 15 on the Billboard Hot Soul Songs chart.

"It's Time For Love" reached No.19 on the Billboard Hot Soul Songs chart.

== Tracklisting ==
No.	Title	Writer(s)	Length
1.	"Imagine This"	Curtis Harmon, James Lloyd, Cedric Napoleon	4:19
2.	"For the Fun of It"	Curtis Harmon, James Lloyd, Cedric Napoleon	5:16
3.	"It's Time for Love"	Curtis Harmon, James Lloyd, Cedric Napoleon, Murray	4:10
4.	"The Shadow of Your Smile"	P. F. Webster, Jay Mandell	5:39
5.	"It's Getting Hot in Here"	Curtis Harmon, James Lloyd, Cedric Napoleon	4:28
6.	"Fo-Fi-Fo"	Grover Washington Jr., Cynthia Biggs	4:45
7.	"Foreverlasting Love"	Grover Washington Jr., Cynthia Biggs, Dexter Wansel	4:44
8.	"Tell Me a Bedtime Story"	Herbie Hancock	3:55
