= The Best Is Yet to Come (Grover Washington Jr. song) =

Single by Grover Washington Jr. featuring Patti LaBelle

from the album The Best Is Yet to Come
- Released: 1983
- Recorded: 1982
- Studio: Sigma Sound, Philadelphia, Pennsylvania
- Genre: Jazz fusion; smooth jazz; jazz soul
- Label: Elektra
- Songwriters: Cynthia Biggs, Dexter Wansel
- Producers: Cynthia Biggs, Dexter Wansel

Patti LaBelle singles chronology
"Family" (1982)	"The Best Is Yet to Come" (1983)	"If Only You Knew" (1983)

"The Best Is Yet to Come" is a 1982 song written by Philadelphia-based songwriters Cynthia Biggs and Dexter Wansel, who also produced the song as a duet between jazz saxophonist Grover Washington Jr. and American recording artist Patti LaBelle.

== Background ==
It was released as a single in February 1983 on Washington's Elektra label. It became Washington's second biggest hit following the success of his Bill Withers duet, "Just the Two of Us", reaching number fourteen on the Billboard R&B singles chart and number four on the Billboard Hot 100's Bubbling Under chart. The song features Washington's trademark saxophone riffs and an inspiring vocal delivery from LaBelle, who first sings it in her mid-range, before reaching higher vocal ranges near the end of the song, similar to the direction she took when she recorded "If Only You Knew" several months earlier.

The song later won LaBelle her first Grammy Award nomination in the Best Female R&B Vocal Performance category. After the success of "The Best Is Yet To Come", LaBelle's label, Philadelphia International Records, released "If Only You Knew", also written by Biggs and Wansel with minor contribution by Kenny Gamble as the first single off her second PIR album, I'm in Love Again. It led to LaBelle finding chart success with the single. LaBelle rarely performed "The Best Is Yet To Come" live in concert. After the 1980s, it was not included in her set list; LaBelle included the song back in her set list during recent tours however.

== Credits ==
- Lead and background vocals by Patti LaBelle
- Saxophone performed by Grover Washington Jr.
- Written and produced by Dexter Wansel and Cynthia Biggs
- Instrumentation by Sigma Sound Studios musicians

== Charts ==
Chart (1983)	Peak position
U.S. Billboard Hot 100 Bubbling Under	4
U.S. Billboard Hot Soul Singles	14
