= I'm in Love Again =

I'm In Love Again

Studio album by Patti LaBelle
- Released: November 25, 1983
- Recorded: 1982–1983
- Studio: Sigma Sound, Philadelphia, Pennsylvania
- Genre: Philadelphia soul; R&B; quiet storm; funk
- Length: 38:41
- Label: Philadelphia International; CBS
- Producer: James R. Ellison; Kenny Gamble; Leon Huff; Joseph Jefferson; Bunny Sigler; Dexter Wansel; Cecil Womack

Patti LaBelle chronology
The Spirit's in It (1981)	I'm In Love Again (1983)	Patti (1985)

Singles from I'm in Love Again
- 1. "If Only You Knew" Released: October 28, 1983; 2. "Love, Need and Want You" Released: 1984

I'm In Love Again is the sixth studio album by American singer Patti LaBelle in 1983. It was released by Philadelphia International Records and Sony Music Entertainment on November 25, 1983, in the United States. LaBelle's commercial breakthrough, it featured her first top ten R&B hits, "Love, Need and Want You" and "If Only You Knew", the latter topping the R&B chart in early 1984. It was later certified gold for selling half a million copies and paved the way for her pop breakthrough in late 1984 with the dance hit "New Attitude".

== Background ==
In 1977, Patti LaBelle began her solo career after sixteen years with the group Labelle. While her debut album, released on Epic, proved successful, her three follow-ups failed to generate similar success. In 1981, when her Epic contract expired, she signed with Philadelphia International Records, and released the album, The Spirit's in It, which produced some success and convinced the label to come up with a follow-up. LaBelle began recording her second PIR album in 1982 at the famed Sigma Sound Studios in Philadelphia with producers Kenny Gamble, Leon Huff and Dexter Wansel.

Gamble & Huff, in executive producing charge of LaBelle's recording, searched to find songs that could give the powerhouse soul singer a charted smash hit, noting that the singer hadn't had a major hit since the release of her 1974 classic, "Lady Marmalade". Of her twelve solo single releases, only "I Don't Go Shopping", "It's a Joy to Have Your Love" and "It's Alright with Me" charted above the top 40 on the R&B charts, with "I Don't Go Shopping" becoming a top 30 hit. At around the same time, LaBelle kept herself busy by participating in Broadway plays and various musical theatre productions, including Your Arms Too Short to Box with God, For Colored Girls Who Have Considered Suicide When the Rainbow Is Enuf and Working, as well as filming her role on the film, A Soldier's Story, which halted the second album's production. That same year, LaBelle had undergone plastic surgery treatment on her nose, to which she claimed, was only to "sing higher notes". Only did the singer later admitted that she had the surgery for "vanity" reasons and while she said she loved the new nose, regretted having it done.

== Recording ==
Recording of the album took place in various dates in 1982 and 1983. Due to LaBelle's non-studio engagements, the album's release was often delayed. The 1982 recordings were mid-tempo love songs with focus on live instrumentation and strings, including "I'm in Love Again", "Love, Need & Want You" and "If Only You Knew", the latter featuring only sparse synthesizer and keyboard work to complement the live sound. During 1982 sessions, LaBelle also recorded the ballad "Hero", which later became a charted hit for Gladys Knight & the Pips in 1983. LaBelle's version was never included on the album. The last song recorded in the 1982 sessions was the country soul ballad "Love Bankrupt", written by Cecil and Linda Womack of Womack & Womack. After a break from working on A Soldier's Story, LaBelle went back to finish the album in 1983 sessions, producing the dance song "I'll Never, Never Give Up". Composed by Leon Huff, the song's focus on synthesizers would result in LaBelle later recording "New Attitude", which was also heavy on synthesizers. She also recorded a cover of the standard jazz song, "Lover Man (Oh, Where Can You Be?)" and a mid-tempo light funk groove, "When Am I Gonna Find True Love". In addition to these songs, Gamble & Huff overdubbed a song left off from The Spirit's in It, a light funk song titled "Body Language".

== Critical reception ==
Professional ratings
Review scores
Source	Rating
AllMusic	3/5 stars
Rolling Stone	3/5 stars

I'm In Love Again received mixed to positive reviews. AllMusic editor Jason Elias wrote that "the best songs here attain Philadelphia International's classic mature and lush sound [...] But as the slow songs ranked with the best of 1980s Philadelphia International, the dance tracks are what diminished this album [...] I'm in Love Again has Labelle getting strong production and good songs, but too much filler prevented this from being better." Debby Miller from Rolling Stone felt that "most of this album is pure show business, slick and heavy-handed. Patti LaBelle sings the songs with her usual clear-voiced enthusiasm, but there aren't any hooks – just her big voice in some big settings. And then there's "If Only You Knew," a ballad she sings with a tortured beauty. Deservedly, it has become a hit; the saddest song of the year is at the top of the soul-R&B; charts. When she wails in the pain of keeping her love a secret, it's as if she's contacted some wellspring of despair. It's hard to believe it's the same voice as the detached one that hollers to the disco beat in some of the LP's other numbers."

== Commercial performance ==
A commercial success, the album became LaBelle's first to chart the top 40 of the US Billboard 200, peaking at number-forty and reaching number-four on the Top R&B/Hip-Hop Albums chart, her highest to date at the time. With sales of over 500,000 copies, I'm in Love Again was certified gold by the Recording Industry Association of America by the end of 1984.

The album launched two singles - "If Only You Knew" and "Love, Need and Want You". The former track reached number-one on the R&B singles chart - LaBelle's first to do so, while also reaching the lower regions of the top 50 on the Billboard Hot 100 peaking at a respective number 46. "Love, Need and Want You" peaked at number ten on the R&B singles chart though it never crossed over to pop charts. "I'll Never, Never Give Up" was only a minor hit on the dance charts.

== Track listing ==
I'm in Love Again track listing
No.	Title	Writer(s)	Producer(s)	Length
1.	"I'm in Love Again"	Bunny Sigler; James Sigler	Bunny Sigler	5:38
2.	"Lover Man (Oh Where Can You Be?)"	Jimmy Davis; Jimmy Sherman; Ram Ramirez	James Sigler; Kenny Gamble	4:05
3.	"Love, Need and Want You"	Gamble; Bunny Sigler	Gamble; Bunny Sigler	4:58
4.	"If Only You Knew"	Cynthia Biggs; Gamble; Dexter Wansel	Gamble; Wansel	4:45
5.	"Body Language"	Harold Payne; Pete Luboff; Pat Luboff	Gamble; James R. Ellison	4:45
6.	"I'll Never, Never Give Up"	Stephanie Huff; Leon Huff	Leon Huff	5:20
7.	"Love Bankrupt"	Cecil Womack; Linda Womack	Cecil Womack	4:32
8.	"When Am I Gonna Find True Love"	Richard Roebuck; Joseph Jefferson; Charles Simmons	Jefferson	4:24
Total length:				38:41

== Personnel ==
Performers and musicians

- Patti LaBelle – all vocals
- Sigma Sound Studio musicians – instruments
- John R. Faith – arrangements (1–3)
- James Sigler – arrangements (4)
- James "Budd" Ellison – arrangements (5)
- Giggs Chase – arrangements (6)
- Leon Huff – arrangements (6)
- Cecil Womack – arrangements (7)
- Joseph Jefferson – arrangements (8)

Technical

- Dirk Devlin – engineer
- James Gallagher – engineer
- Arthur Stoppe – engineer
- Joseph Tarsia – engineer
- Scott McMinn – assistant engineer
- Michael Tarsia – assistant engineer
- Vince Warsavage – assistant engineer
- John Wisner – assistant engineer
- Frankford/Wayne Mastering Labs (Philadelphia, Pennsylvania) – mastering location
- Jean Scott – A&R coordinator
- Patti LaBelle – stylist
- Bill Novenger – dress
- Christi Brothers (New York City) – coat
- Norma Harris – hair
- Michael Robinson – make-up

== Charts ==
Chart performance for I'm in Love Again
Chart (1983–84)	Peak position
US Billboard 200	40
US Top R&B/Hip-Hop Albums (Billboard)	4
US R&B Top 75 (Cashbox)	3
US Top 100 Albums (Cashbox)	37

== Certifications ==
Certifications for I'm in Love Again
Region	Certification	Certified units/sales
United States (RIAA)	Gold	500,000^{^}
^{^} Shipments figures based on certification alone.
