= Always in the Mood =

Studio album by Shirley Jones
- Released: July 1986
- Studios: Kajem Studios, Gladwyne, Pennsylvania; Lighthouse Studios, North Hollywood, California; Sigma Sound Studios, Inc., Philadelphia, Pennsylvania; Yamaha Studios, Glendale, California
- Genre: R&B
- Length: 47:19
- Label: Philadelphia International
- Producers: Leon Huff; Kenny Gamble; Dexter Wansel; Al McKay; Bunny Sigler; Larry Davis; Reggie Griffin; Zane Giles; William Lacy

Shirley Jones chronology
Always in the Mood (1986)	With You (1994)

Always in the Mood is an album by R&B singer Shirley Jones, released in 1986 on Philadelphia International Records. The album peaked at No. 8 on the Billboard Top R&B Albums chart.

== Critical reception ==
Professional ratings
Review scores
Source	Rating
AllMusic	3/5 stars

John Bush of AllMusic took note that "After the Jones Girls broke up, Kenneth Gamble (their former producer at Philadelphia Intl.) invited lead singer Shirley Jones back to the fold for her solo debut. Though it hasn't worn its mid-'80s vintage very well, Always in the Mood was a solid collection of performances that pushed one song, "Do You Get Enough Love," into the top spot on the R&B charts. Boasting the songwriting/production talents of Gamble/Huff, Bunny Sigler, Dexter Wansel, and Instant Funk's Larry Davis, the album sounded at least as good as the last few Jones Girls full-lengths, and Jones didn't sound as though she missed her sisters.

David Toop of the Sunday Times listed Always in the Mood on his list of 1986's albums of the year.

== Singles ==
"Do You Get Enough Love" peaked at No. 1 on the Billboard Top R&B Singles chart.

== Track listing ==
No.	Title	Length
1.	"Do You Get Enough Love"	4:46
2.	"Breaking Up"	4:25
3.	"Last Night I Needed Somebody"	4:57
4.	"She Knew About Me"	4:37
5.	"Always In the Mood"	5:20
6.	"I'll Do Anything For You"	4:47
7.	"Surrender"	4:30
8.	"Caught Me With My Guard Down"	4:03

== Charts ==
Chart (1986)	Peak position
US Billboard 200	128
US Top R&B Albums (Billboard)	8
