= Release =

Release may refer to:

- Art release, the public distribution of an artistic production, such as a film, album, or song
- Legal release, a legal instrument
- News release, a communication directed at the news media
- Release (ISUP), a code to identify and debug events in ISUP signaling
- Release (phonetics), the opening of the closure of a consonant, most commonly a plosive consonant
- Release from imprisonment
- Release, in medical classification, a root operation in the ICD-10 Procedure Coding System
- Software release, a distribution of a computer software in the software release life cycle

== Film and television ==
- Release (film), a 2010 British film starring Daniel Brocklebank
- "Release" (Angel), a television episode
- "Release" (Law & Order), a television episode
- "Release" (The X-Files), a television episode
- "The Release" (Animorphs), a television episode
- "The Release" (Entourage), a television episode

== Music ==
- Release, part of the envelope of a musical note
- Release, a bridge in thirty-two-bar form
- Release Entertainment, a subsidiary label of Relapse Records

=== Albums ===
- Release (Cop Shoot Cop album), 1994
- Release (Damon Johnson album) or the title song, 2010
- Release (David Knopfler album), 1983
- Release (Pet Shop Boys album), 2002
- Release (Sister Hazel album) or the title song, 2009

=== Songs ===
- "Release" (The Tea Party song), 1998
- "Release" (Timbaland song), 2008
- "Release (The Tension)", by Patti LaBelle, 1980
- "Release", by Afro Celt Sound System from Volume 2: Release, 1999
- "Release", by George from Polyserena, 2002
- "Release", by Imagine Dragons from Smoke + Mirrors, 2015
- "Release", by Paul McCartney from Standing Stone, 1997
- "Release", by Pearl Jam from Ten, 1991
- "Release, Release", by Yes from Tormato, 1978
- "Release", by Black Eyed Peas from Bridging the Gap, 2000
- "Release", by Xentrix from Kin, 1992

== Organizations ==
- Release (agency), a UK agency that provides legal services for young people charged with drug possession
- Release International, an organization for monitoring persecution of Christians
- Release Magazine, a Swedish alternative music online magazine

== See also ==
- Delayed release (disambiguation)
- Flash release, a grape-pressing technique
- Dismissal (employment), termination of employment
- Release time, in US public schools, time set aside for students' private religious education
- Released (disambiguation)
