= Soul Intent =

Studio album by Pieces of a Dream
- Released: February 24, 2009
- Genre: Jazz
- Length: 54:54
- Label: Heads Up International
- Producer: Dave Love

Pieces of a Dream chronology
Pillow Talk (2006)	Soul Intent (2009)	In the Moment (2013)

Professional ratings
Review scores
Source	Rating
Jazz Times	(favourable)
All About Jazz	(favourable)

Soul Intent is the fifteenth studio album by R&B and jazz fusion group Pieces of a Dream issued in February 2009 on Heads Up International Records. The album reached No. 5 on Billboard Contemporary Jazz Albums chart and No. 11 on the Billboard Top Jazz Albums chart.

== Track listing ==
No.	Title	Writer(s)	Length
1.	"Sway On"	J Lloyd	4:11
2.	"Vision Accomplished"	C Harmon, J Lloyd	4:19
3.	"Give U My Heart"	K Edmonds, A Reid, D Simmons, B Watson	4:38
4.	"Apb"	C Harmon, H Lewis, B Sims	4:26
5.	"Hindsight"	D Dyson, C Harmon, R Lawrence, J Lloyd	6:33
6.	"Soul Intent"	J Lloyd	4:22
7.	"Step on It"	J Lloyd	4:30
8.	"Things Are Looking Up"	D Dyson, C Harmon, R Lawrence, J Lloyd	6:15
9.	"D Fuse the Situation"	D Dyson, C Harmon, E Baccus, Jr., R Lawrence, J Lloyd	6:24
10.	"Stand Up"	C Harmon, B Sims	4:21
11.	"Anywhere You Are"	C Harmon, E Baccus, Jr., B Sims	4:55

== Personnel ==
=== Musicians ===
- Eddie Baccus, Jr. - Composer, Saxophone
- Paul Blakemore - Mastering, Remastering
- Randy Bowland - Guitar
- Joe Cunningham, Tony Watson Jr. - Saxophone
- David Dyson - Bass, Composer, Guitar (Bass)
- Kenneth "Babyface" Edmonds, Holmer Lewis, Antonio M. Reid, Daryl Simmons, Boaz McWade Watson - Composer
- Curtis Harmon - Audio Engineer, Audio Production, Composer, Drums, Engineer, Keyboards, Percussion, Producer, Programming
- Robert Hoffman - Design
- Rohn Lawrence - Composer, Guitar
- James K. Lloyd - Audio Engineer, Audio Production, Composer, Keyboards
- Dave Love - Executive Producer
- Pieces of a Dream - Primary Artist
- John Secoges - Photography
- Bernie Sims - Audio Engineer, Audio Production, Composer, Guitar (Bass), Keyboards
- Natalie Singer - Product Manager
- Martin Walters - Mixing, Programming

== Charts ==
Chart (2009)	Peak position
US Contemporary Jazz Albums (Billboard)	5
US Top Jazz Albums (Billboard)	11

=== Singles ===
Year	Single	Chart positions
Year	Single	Billboard Smooth Jazz Songs
2009	"Sway On"	22
2009	"Vision Accomplished"	18
