= If Only You Knew =

Single by Patti LaBelle

from the album I'm in Love Again
- B-side: "I'll Never, Never Give Up"
- Released: October 28, 1983
- Recorded: July 1982
- Studio: Sigma Sound, Philadelphia, Pennsylvania
- Genre: R&B; Philadelphia soul; quiet storm
- Length: 4:48 (album version); 3:47 (single edit)
- Label: Philadelphia International; PI 04248
- Songwriters: Cynthia Biggs; Dexter Wansel; Kenneth Gamble
- Producers: Cynthia Biggs; Dexter Wansel; Kenneth Gamble

Patti LaBelle singles chronology
"I'll Never, Never Give Up" (1983)	"If Only You Knew" (1983)	"Love Has Finally Come at Last" (1984)

"If Only You Knew" is a single written and produced primarily by Dexter Wansel and Cynthia Biggs for American singer Patti LaBelle's sixth solo album, I'm in Love Again. It was released as the album's official first single in 1983, spending four weeks at #1 on the U.S. R&B chart during January and February 1984; it reached #46 on the Billboard Hot 100.

== Overview ==
By 1982, Patti LaBelle had a 20-year career in music, experiencing minor and major success, first with her longtime group, Patti LaBelle and the Bluebelles (later known as Labelle), and then briefly with her solo career. While LaBelle had enjoyed critical success with her self-titled solo album and four subsequent albums following that on Epic Records, none of the records translated to commercial success, as had been a problem during her long tenure with Labelle, who only had one major hit, "Lady Marmalade", in 1975.

While respected for her longevity in the music business, LaBelle's recordings were not easily marketable as producers struggled to find a hit for the singer. While LaBelle was regarded as an exciting live performer, none of the nine singles LaBelle released as a solo artist hit the top of either the pop or R&B chart, and her four albums with Epic were only marginally successful. Seeking a change in direction, CBS Records, the parent label for Epic Records, transferred the singer's contract to Philadelphia International Records, co-founded by the singer's hometown friends, Kenny Gamble and Leon Huff.

The label helped to produce her first album for PIR, The Spirit's In It. Due to PIR's fallout with pop audiences at the end of the seventies and again struggling to find a recording suitable to become a major hit for the singer, the album failed to produce hits like her previous four offerings.

== Recording ==
In the summer of 1982, while on a break from the Broadway play, Your Arm's Too Short to Box with God, LaBelle entered Sigma Sound Studios to record with writing-producing team Dexter Wansel and Cynthia Biggs. The duo had composed a previous song for LaBelle, "Shoot Him on Sight", off The Spirit's in It.

During the 1982 recording sessions, Wansel and Biggs presented LaBelle with a mid-tempo song titled "If Only You Knew", about a person seeking an unsuspecting love interest. At first LaBelle sought to record the song in a straightforward approach. However, Wansel wanted LaBelle to perform it at her mid-range and smile while singing because "her vocals were clearer when she smiled."

LaBelle and Wansel agreed to a compromise: during the verses and during most of the duration of the track, LaBelle would sing at her softer mid-range tone while delivering the final choruses with a full-throated soprano vocal range.

Because LaBelle was busy at work on Broadway and other projects, it took over a year before songs from her second album, I'm in Love Again, were completed the following year. "If Only You Knew" was given its title after Gamble settled a dispute between Wansel and Biggs over a lyric line.

When it came to release a track from the album, Gamble & Huff chose "If Only You Knew" as the first single since they felt the song had "hit potential" among the songs featured on the album, Wansel disagreed but LaBelle agreed with the label founders.

"She loved it from the very beginning and saw the potential, that there were a lot of lonely people out there who loved other people and didn't really know how to say it," he recalled in The Billboard Book Of Number One R&B Hits. "She felt like she could say it for them," Wansel continued.

== Background and composition ==
"If Only You Knew" was recorded at Philadelphia's Sigma Sound Studios in 1982. It was released in October 1983 as the first song off LaBelle's second Philadelphia International album, I'm in Love Again. It was written and composed by Dexter Wansel and Cynthia Biggs with Wansel as its producer. Wansel featured drums, bass, rhythm guitar, and strings; it was arranged by John R. Faith. The song starts off in E major and is D flat in the verses.

== Reception ==
The song had a slow climb to the top of the R&B chart after its debut in October 1983, reaching the top 10 by December of the year and peaking at #1 in January 1984, staying at the top spot of Billboard's Black Singles chart for four weeks. LaBelle wrote in her memoirs, Don't Block the Blessings: Revelations of a Lifetime, that she got so excited hearing the news of the song reaching #1 that she jumped on the top of her bed in celebration.

The song eventually crossed over to pop radio becoming a moderate success reaching #46 on the Billboard Hot 100, marking Patti LaBelle's first-ever entry on the Hot 100 as a solo artist, six and a half years after going solo. It was her first solo single to hit #1 on the R&B chart. Prior to its release, LaBelle's biggest-charting song was the Grover Washington ballad, "The Best Is Yet to Come", which reached #14 on the R&B chart in early 1983, resulting in the singer's first Grammy nomination. "Lady Marmalade" with Labelle, "On My Own" with Michael McDonald, and "If Only You Knew" are Patti's's three #1 hits on the R&B chart. The song fared better on Cashbox, where it peaked at number 39 on its Top 100 Singles chart, becoming her first top 40 US pop hit.

The success of the song helped I'm In Love Again reach gold status in the U.S., her first solo album to do so. "If Only You Knew" has gone on to be one of the singer's signature songs from her solo career. LaBelle re-recorded the song for her live albums, Live! in 1992, and One Night Only! in 1998, but only performing the first verse of the original song.

== Weekly charts ==
Chart (1984)	Peak position
US Billboard Hot 100	46
US Hot R&B/Hip-Hop Songs (Billboard)	1
US Top 100 Singles (Cash Box)	39
US Black Contemporary Singles (Cash Box)	1

== Credits ==
- Lead vocals by Patti LaBelle
- Instrumentation by Sigma Sound Studio musicians
- Produced by Kenny Gamble, Dexter Wansel and Cynthia Biggs
- Arranged by John R. Faith

== Covers and samples ==
The most notable covers of the song were by jazz singer Phil Perry, who recorded it on his 1994 album, Pure Pleasure and Keke Wyatt, who recorded it on her debut solo album, Soul Sista. Wyatt said LaBelle called her to congratulate her on her recording of the song, saying humorously, "you better sing it, heffa". Singer-actress D'Atra Hicks also covered it for her album, Finally My Time and performed it in the Tyler Perry stage play What's Done in the Dark. Singer Oke also covered the song (in its Keke Wyatt-styled cover) in 2001, including the 90's Male Group Soul for Real.

R&B fictional quintet group Milestone sampled that riff as an interpolation for their track "I Care 'Bout You" from their Soul Food album. Chicago-based rap group Do or Die recorded an interpretative rap version with Twista and Syleena Johnson guest vocalizing on their album, D.O.D., as did Remy Ma on her mixtape, BlasRemy, as a dedication to then-boyfriend (now husband), Papoose. Remy's version sampled LaBelle's original. Another sample of the song came from Chicano rapper Capone, who had a song with the same name. Rapper Bizzy Bone included the sample of the song as an interpretation of his composition, "Nobody Can Stop Me", from his Heaven'z Movie album. In 2010, both Jasmine V and Ciara recorded the song "If Only", which interpolated parts of the LaBelle song. Jasmine's version was recorded as a demo while Ciara's version was deleted off the final track list of her album, Basic Instinct.

Other artists such as SWV (and group member Coko), Ledisi, Tamia, and Brian McKnight have covered the song in concert.

Rachelle Ferrell, Ron Isley, Peabo Bryson, and Tamia sang the song in tribute to LaBelle as she was honored at the 1998 Soul Train Music Awards. Mariah Carey featured LaBelle's rendition of "Over the Rainbow" as part of her live tribute following a brief performance of "If Only You Knew" at the 1998 Essence Awards.

SWV also included a cover on their 2012 album "I Missed Us", which went on to be nominated for Best Traditional R&B Performance at the 55th Annual Grammy Awards. SWV performed the song on the 22nd Annual Trumpet Awards in 2014 during the Gamble & Huff Tribute, other artists such as Joe, Carl Thomas, Lyfe Jennings, and the late Billy Paul was also part of that tribute. In 2015, Patti, Grammy-nominated singer Tamar Braxton, and R&B singer K. Michelle sang the song at the 15th annual BET Awards. R&B singer Tank sampled the song for his 2016 single "You Don't Know" featuring rapper Wale.

== See also ==
- List of number-one R&B singles of 1984 (U.S.)
