= Wansel =

Wansel is a surname. Notable people with the surname include:

- Andrew Wansel, also known as Pop Wansel (born 1988), American songwriter and record producer
- Dexter Wansel (1950–2026), American R&B and jazz fusion singer, arranger, musician, composer, conductor, synthesist, and A&R director
