= Tasty (Patti LaBelle album) =

Studio album by Patti LaBelle
- Released: May 19, 1978
- Recorded: 1978
- Studios: The Automatt (San Francisco, California)
- Length: 47:12
- Label: Epic
- Producer: David Rubinson

Patti LaBelle chronology
Patti LaBelle (1977)	Tasty (1978)	It's Alright with Me (1979)

Tasty is the second solo album released by recording artist Patti LaBelle, her second solo album with Epic Records. Compared to the success of her debut album, released the previous year, the album performed only modestly well but featured the popular tunes "Eyes in the Back of My Head", which became a club hit, the Latin soul flavored "Teach Me Tonight (Me Gusta Tu Baile)", the David Lasley composition "I See Home" (covered a year later by Tina Turner) and the ballad "Little Girls". "Eyes in the Back of My Head" became an international hit reaching the top five of the Italian singles chart. The album also featured covers of songs by Boz Scaggs, The Drifters and Roy Hamilton in addition to a couple songs co-written by LaBelle herself, including "Teach Me Tonight" and "Quiet Time".

== Critical reception ==
Professional ratings
Review scores
Source	Rating
AllMusic	4.5/5 stars

AllMusic editor Alex Henderson wrote: "No one is going to mistake Tasty, LaBelle's second solo effort, for Nightbirds, Phoenix, or Chameleon. All of the things that the Labelle trio was known for—cosmic lyrics, socio-political observations, and an aggressive rock edge—are missing from this 1978 LP. Compared to Phoenix or 'Chameleon, this record seems safer and less dangerous [...] Tasty is, without question, one of her finest solo efforts."

== Track listing ==
All tracks produced by David Rubinson.

Tasty track listing
No.	Title	Writer(s)	Length
1.	"Save the Last Dance for Me"	Doc Pomus; Mort Shuman	5:05
2.	"Monkey See Monkey Do"	Michael Franks	5:12
3.	"Little Girls"	Allee Willis	6:46
4.	"You Make It Hard to Say No"	Boz Scaggs	5:35
5.	"Teach Me Tonight (Me Gusta Tu Baile)"	LaBelle; Armstead Edwards; James R. Budd Ellison	5:21
6.	"Quiet Time"	LaBelle; Edwards; Ellison	5:05
7.	"Don't Let Go"	Jesse Stone	4:06
8.	"I See Home"	Allee Willis; David Lasley	7:57
9.	"Eyes in the Back of My Head"	Pete Wingfield	5:25
Total length:			47:12

2014 remaster
No.	Title	Writer(s)	Length
10.	"Teach Me Tonight (Me Gusta Tu Baile)" (Single Version)	LaBelle; Edwards; Ellison	3:26
11.	"Little Girls" (Single Version)	Willis	3:58
12.	"Eyes in the Back of My Head" (12" Disco Version)	Wingfield	8:00
13.	"Save the Last Dance for Me" (12" Disco Version)	Pomus; Shuman	7:14

== Personnel ==
Performers and musicians

- Patti LaBelle – lead vocals, musical direction, vocal arrangements, backing vocals (5)
- James Budd Ellison – keyboards, musical direction, vocal arrangements
- Richard Kermode – acoustic piano (5)
- Leo Nocentelli – guitars
- Ray Parker Jr. – guitars
- Wah Wah Watson – guitars
- Eddie N. Watkins Jr. – bass guitar (1–4, 6–9)
- Pablo Tellez – bass guitar (5)
- Ollie E. Brown – drums (1)
- James Gadson – drums (2–4, 6–9)
- Leon "Ndugu" Chancler – drums (5)
- Andy Narell – steel drums
- Raul Rekow – congas (1, 2)
- Sheila Escovedo – timbales (5)
- Dale Warren – orchestral arrangements and conductor (3, 8)
- Teresa Adams – orchestra direction (3, 8)
- Nathan Rubin – concertmaster (3, 8)
- Al Bent – brass arrangements (4, 5)
- David Rubinson – arrangements, vocal arrangements
- The Waters [Julia, Luther, Maxine and Oren Waters] – backing vocals (1–4, 7–9)
- Carlos Alomar – backing vocals (5)
- Willie Colón – backing vocals (5)
- The Johnny Land Singers – backing vocals (6)

Technical

- David Rubinson – producer, engineer
- Fred Catero – engineer
- Chris Minto – assistant engineer
- Cheryl Ward – assistant engineer
- Tony Lane – art direction, design
- Weldon Andersen – back cover photography
- Benno Friedman – front cover photography
- George Annis – music copyist
- Vicki Gray – music copyist
- Tony Kaye – music copyist

2014 reissue credits

- Wayne A. Dickson – producer, additional remastering
- Michal L. Bednarek – associate producer
- Malcolm McKenzie – associate producer
- Christian John Wikane – associate producer
- Nick Robbins – remastering

== Charts ==
Chart performance for Tasty
Chart (1978)	Peak position
US Billboard 200	129
US Top R&B/Hip-Hop Albums (Billboard)	39
US Top 75 R&B Albums (Cashbox)	34
US Top 100 Albums (Cashbox)	171
US World R&B LP (Record World)	29
US World Albums (Record World)	116
