= Released =

Released may refer to:

- Released (Jade Warrior album), 1971
- Released (Patti LaBelle album), 1980
- Released: 1985–1995, an album by Kronos Quartet, 1995
- Released, an album by Westlife, 2005
- "Released", a song by Norther from Dreams of Endless War, 2002

== See also ==
- Release (disambiguation)
