= Splashdown (disambiguation) =

A splashdown is the landing of a spacecraft or launch vehicle in a body of water.

Splashdown may also refer to:

== Entertainment ==
- Star Trek: Voyager – Splashdown, a Star Trek four-issue comic book limited series published by Marvel Comics under the imprint Paramount Comics (April–July 1998)
- Splashdown (video game), a 2001 console video game series (Splashdown and Splashdown: Rides Gone Wild) about racing jet-skis
- Splashdown, a minor superhero from The Incredibles

=== Television episodes ===
- "Splash Down", a 1972 episode of The Adventures of Sir Prancelot
- "Splashdown", a 1998 episode of Flipper (1995)
- "Splashdown", a 1967 episode of Gilligan's Island season 3
- "Splashdown", a 1968 episode of Joe 90
- "Splashdown", a 1995 episode of seaQuest DSV
- "Splashdown!", a 1995 episode of The Adventures of Pete & Pete

== Music ==
- Splashdown (band), a rock / trip hop band from Massachusetts
- Splashdown (Hot Tuna album), 1984
- Splashdown (Breakwater album), 1980

== Other uses ==
- Splashdown, an element on roller coasters
- Splashdown (log flume)
- Splashdown Waterparks, two British water parks, Splashdown Poole and Splashdown Quaywest

== See also ==
- Water landing
