= We Are One (Pieces of a Dream album) =

Studio album by Pieces of a Dream
- Released: 1982
- Recorded: 1982
- Studio: Sigma Sound, Philadelphia, Pennsylvania
- Genre: Jazz
- Label: Elektra
- Producer: Grover Washington, Jr.

Pieces of a Dream chronology
Pieces of a Dream (1981)	We Are One (1982)	Imagine This (1983)

Professional ratings
Review scores
Source	Rating
AllMusic	2/5 stars

We Are One is the second album by the jazz ensemble Pieces of a Dream, issued in 1982 on Elektra Records. The album reached No. 22 on the Billboard Top R&B Albums chart.

== Track listing ==
No.	Title	Writer(s)	Length
1.	"Don't Be Sad"	Cedric A. Napoleon, Curtis Harmon, James Keith Lloyd	4:35
2.	"Please Don't Do This to Me"	Cynthia Biggs, Dexter Wansel	3:29
3.	"For Ramsey"	Cedric A. Napoleon, Curtis Harmon, James Keith Lloyd	3:58
4.	"You Know I Want You"	Barbara Walker, Cedric A. Napoleon, Curtis Harmon, James Keith Lloyd	4:28
5.	"Mt. Airy Groove"	Cedric A. Napoleon, Curtis Harmon, James Keith Lloyd	3:29
6.	"We Are One"	Cedric A. Napoleon, Curtis Harmon, James Keith Lloyd	4:53
7.	"When You Are Here With Me"	Grover Washington, Jr.	4:37
8.	"Pop Rock"	Cedric A. Napoleon, Curtis Harmon, James Keith Lloyd	5:06
9.	"Yo Frat"	Cedric A. Napoleon, Curtis Harmon, James Keith Lloyd	4:48

== Singles ==
The track, "Mt. Airy Groove", reached No. 33 on the Billboard Hot R&B Singles chart. It was covered by the rap group Leaders of the New School on the album Rubáiyát: Elektra's 40th Anniversary.

== Personnel ==
- Herb Smith - acoustic guitar, electric guitar
- Cedric A. Napoleon - bass
- Dexter Wansel - synthesizer on "Please Don't Do This To Me"
- Grover Washington, Jr. - soprano saxophone, vocoder on "You Know I Want You"
- Curtis D. Harmon - drums
- James K. Lloyd - Fender Rhodes, Steinway Concert Grand piano, Jupiter 8 synthesizer
- Leonard "Doc" Gibbs (tracks: A2, B1, B4), Ralph MacDonald (tracks: A1, A3, A5), Vincent Diggs (tracks: A2, B4) - percussion
- Barbara Walker, Cedric A. Napoleon - lead vocals on "You Know I Want You"
- Rachelle Barnes - lead and backing vocals on "Yo Frat"
- Cedric A. Napoleon - lead vocals on "Please Don't Do This To Me"
- Cynthia Biggs, Barbara Walker, Theodore Wortham Sr. - backing vocals on "Please Don't Do This to Me"

== Charts ==
Year	Chart	Peak position
1982	Billboard Top Pop Albums	114
1982	Billboard Top Soul Albums	22
1982	Billboard Top Jazz Albums	4

=== Singles ===
Year	Single	Chart position
Year	Single	Hot R&B Singles
1982	"Mt. Airy Groove"	33
