= Makes You Wanna =

Studio album by Pieces of a Dream
- Released: 1988
- Studios: Kajem/Victory; Larrabee; Mediasound; Quad
- Genres: Jazz, R&B, funk
- Label: Manhattan
- Producers: Lenny White, Pieces of a Dream, Cliff Dawson, Preston Glass

Pieces of a Dream chronology
Joyride (1986)	Makes You Wanna (1988)	Bout Dat Time (1990)

Makes You Wanna is an album by the American band Pieces of a Dream, released in 1988 on Manhattan Records. The album reached No. 24 on the Billboard Contemporary Jazz Albums chart.

== Critical reception ==
Mike Joyce of The Washington Post said, "Philadelphia's own Pieces of a Dream does engage in at least some straight-ahead jazz on its new album Makes You Wanna—but to enjoy that track ('Yubie'), you'll have to pick up the CD version. Otherwise, the band focuses strictly on R&B fusion and funk tunes. With its big beat, synth riffs and reverberating bass lines, even Thelonious Monk's 'Round Midnight' is aimed at the dance floor." Will Smith of the Omaha World-Herald found Pieces of a Dream "no longer makes much of an attempt at fusion, settling instead for commercial stuff rooted in funk."

William C. Trott of UPI remarked "Pieces of a Dream, a five-person assemblage headed by keyboard player James Lloyd and drummer Curtis Harmon, tries to move between the worlds of funk and jazz and it turns out to be a rough trip...when Pieces of a Dream wanders out of its solid dance groove and into jazzier climes, things get a little sleepy."

== Tracklisting ==
No.	Title	Length
1.	"Ain't My Love Enough"	4:49
2.	"We Belong to Each Other"	4:58
3.	"Makes You Wanna"	5:13
4.	"Rising to the Top"	5:40
5.	"'Round Midnight"	5:07
6.	"Mellow Magic"	4:32
7.	"Feelin' for You"	4:53
8.	"Holding Back the Years"	6:25
9.	"Yubie, Yubie"	4:37
10.	"Same Place, Same Time"	4:39
