= Pieces of a Man (disambiguation) =

Pieces of a Man is a 1971 album by Gil Scott-Heron.

Pieces of a Man may also refer to:

- Pieces of a Man (band)
- Pieces of a Man (AZ album), 1998
- Pieces of a Man (Mick Jenkins album), 2018

== See also ==
- Pieces of a Dream (disambiguation)
- Pieces of a Woman, a 2020 drama film by Kornél Mundruczó
