= Pieces of a Dream =

Pieces of a Dream may refer to:

- Pieces of a Dream (Anastacia album), 2005
- "Pieces of a Dream" (Anastacia song), 2005
- "Pieces of a Dream" (Chemistry song), 2001
- Pieces of a Dream (band), a jazz fusion group
  - Pieces of a Dream (Pieces of a Dream album), 1981
