= Hurry Up This Way Again =

1980 song by the Stylistics

"Hurry Up This Way Again" is a song originally recorded by The Stylistics. It reached No. 18 on the U.S. R&B chart. The track was written by Cynthia Biggs and Dexter Wansel in 1980. It was covered by Phyllis Hyman for her album, Forever with You, and sampled in the song, "Politics as Usual", by Jay-Z from his debut album, Reasonable Doubt.

Other versions have been recorded by Regina Belle, Nick Colionne, Will Downing, Terri Gore, Walter Beasley and Patrice Rushen.
