= David Dyson (musician) =

American musician (born 1965)

- Born: David Reeves Dyson; 3 April 1965 (age 61); Rapid City, South Dakota, U.S.
- Genres: Jazz, funk, R&B, rock, pop, reggae
- Occupations: Musician, songwriter, arranger, producer
- Instruments: Bass guitar, double bass
- Years active: 1988–present
- Label: Lohandfunk
- Website: daviddysonbass.com

David Dyson (born 3 April 1965) is an American bassist, songwriter, arranger, and producer. Throughout his career, he has performed with an array of artists including New Kids on the Block, Meshell Ndegeocello, Lalah Hathaway, Pieces of a Dream, George Duke, Regina Bell, Jonathan Butler, Najee, Candy Dulfer, Rick Braun, Gerald Albright, Norman Brown, Bobby Lyle, Doc Powell, and Michael Franks.

== Early life ==
David Reeves Dyson was born on 3 April 1965 in Rapid City, South Dakota. When he was two years old, his family relocated to the Washington metropolitan area, where he was raised and attended school. Dyson played the baritone (euphonium) in school, but was inspired to switch to the bass guitar at the age of twelve after hearing recordings of Larry Graham and Louis Johnson. At the age of fourteen, he decided that he wanted to pursue a career in music. After high school Dyson attended Berklee College of Music in Boston, Massachusetts, where he received a B.A. degree in 1988. Although he taught himself to play bass, Dyson did take several lessons while attending college. He also learned to play the upright bass, piano, and guitar.

== Musical career ==
After graduating from Berklee, Dyson was offered a bassist position with recording artist Walter Beasley. Dyson performed with him from 1988 to 1989. In the fall of 1988, producer Maurice Starr was searching for musicians for New Kids on the Block. Dyson auditioned and landed the gig. He toured with them from 1989 to 1992 as their bassist and musical director. Shortly after coming off the road with NKOTB, Dyson started developing his original Mutepicking style, creating a technique that many have attempted to duplicate. In 1992, he was a bassist and composer with Chico Freeman and Brainstorm. From 1993, Dyson has toured and recorded with Michael Franks, Greg Osby, Terumasa Hino, Gary Thomas, Kevin Toney, Takeshi Itoh, Jack Lee, and Bob James. Dyson was a bassist with Steve Coleman and Five Elements in 1996 and he has two Grammy nominations as a bassist, composer, and co-producer with the Hagans/Belden band (trumpeter Tim Hagans and producer Bob Belden) from 1999 and presently. Dyson began touring with Meshell Ndegeocello in May 1997. He continued through 1999 and from 2001 to 2002. From 2003 to 2006, he was a bassist with Jonathan Butler.

Dyson began playing with Pieces of a Dream in 2000 at a concert in Baltimore, Maryland, after substituting for the original bassist. Dyson recorded and performed with Peter White (2005–present), Chuck Brown (2006–2007), and Lalah Hathaway (2008–present). In addition, Dyson was a member of the Towson University faculty as a bass instructor in the department of music. He was also head instructor of the course David Dyson's Groove Concepts at MusicDojo.com. Dyson is a faculty member of InDepth Jazz clinics and concerts and an instructor with Gerald Veasley's Bass BootCamp and Bass Break LIVE. He was a staff writer for Bass Musician magazine and is the founder and president of Lil Doc Productions and Lohandfunk Records. Dyson released his debut CD Soulmates in 2000, The Dawning in 2004, and Unleashed in 2008.

== Custom bass ==
In 2008, Dyson was presented with his first David Dyson/Lohandfunk signature series bass created by Pete Skjold. The specifications are: 5 string fretted, ash body, myrtle top, maple fingerboard, maple pick up covers and knobs, 5-piece maple/purpleheart neck, 2-SC-1 pick ups, audere 4-band pre w/5-position z-mode rotary switch – standard (also available with the Skjold/east custom pre-amp). In 2011, Dyson debuted his fretless Skjold signature series bass at the NAMM Show in Anaheim, California.

== Discography ==
=== As leader/composer ===
- Soulmates (Lightyear, 1999)
- The Dawning (2004)
- Unleashed (Lo Hand Funk, 2008)

=== As sideman ===
With Bob Belden

- Strawberry Fields (1996)
- Tapestry (1997)
- Black Dahlia (2001)

With Steve Coleman

- The Opening of the Way (1996)
- Genesis (1997)

=== Also as composer/co-producer ===
With Tim Hagans

- Animation, Imagination (1999) Grammy nomination
- Re-Animation Live (2000) Grammy nomination

With Unit 3 Deep

- Groove Theory (2017)

With Tracy Hamlin

- Seasons (2005)
- Better Days (2009)

With Marcus Johnson Urban Grooves (2000)

- Just Doing What I Do (2004)
- In Concert for a Cause (2006)
- Phoenix (2007)
- This is How I Rock (2010)

With Jack Lee

- Gracefulee (1993)
- Where My Heart Goes (1996)
- Into the Night (1997)
- Message from Paris (2000)
- Belo to Soul (2002)

With Pieces of a Dream

- Acquainted With the Night (2001)
- Love's Silhouette (2002)
- No Assembly Required (2004)
- Soul Intent (2009)

With others

- Philip Bailey – Soul on Jazz (2002)
- Rick Braun – Yours Truly (2006)
- Jonathan Butler – Jonathan (2005)
- Chico Freeman – Threshold (1992)
- Ron Holloway – Live at the Montpelier Cultural Center (2003)
- Jaared – Forward (2001)
- Jackiem Joyner – Baby Soul (2007)
- Masabumi Kikuchi, DJ Katsuya, DJ Hiro – Raw Material No. 1, M. Kikuchi (1996)
- Bobby Lyle – Straight & Smooth (2004)
- Najee – Rising Sun (2009)
- Meshell Ndegeocello – Lilith Fair Vol. 3 (1999)
- New Kids on the Block – Step by Step (1990)
- Scritti Politti – Anomie & Bonhomie (1999)
- John Stoddart – Love So Real (1997)
- Peter White – Playin Favorites (2006)
- Alyson Williams – It's About Time (2004)
- Frederic Yonnet – Front & Center (2004)
