= Released (Patti LaBelle album) =

Studio album by Patti LaBelle
- Released: March 14, 1980
- Studios: Sea-Saint Studios (New Orleans, Louisiana)
- Genres: Funk; Soul
- Length: 40:17 (Original release); 47:44 (Remastered release)
- Label: Epic
- Producer: Allen Toussaint

Patti LaBelle chronology
It's Alright with Me (1979)	Released (1980)	The Spirit's in It (1981)

Singles from Released
- 1. "Release (The Tension)" Released: 1980

Professional ratings
Review scores
Source	Rating
AllMusic	3/5 stars

Released is the fourth studio album by the American singer Patti LaBelle. It was released by Epic Records on March 14, 1980, in the United States. The album featured the hits "I Don't Go Shopping", written by previous collaborator David Lasley and musician Peter Allen, and the title track, "Release (The Tension)", which was written by Allen Toussaint, who produced the entire album. The title track found some international success upon its release while "I Don't Go Shopping" was her first top 40 R&B charted single since 1977. Along with her frequent collaborator, James "Budd" Ellison, LaBelle lyrically co-wrote the last five songs on the album.

== Track listing ==
All tracks produced and arranged by Allen Toussaint.

No.	Title	Writer(s)	Length
1.	"Give It Up (The Dawning of Rejection)"	Allen Toussaint	5:40
2.	"Don't Make Your Angel Cry"	Toussaint	3:20
3.	"Release"	Toussaint	3:01
4.	"I Don't Go Shopping"	Peter Allen; David Lasley	3:54
5.	"Ain't That Enough"	Patti LaBelle; James Ellison; Victor Orsborn	3:45
6.	"Love Has Finally Come"	LaBelle; Ellison; Orsborn	5:36
7.	"Come and Dance With Me"	LaBelle; Ellison; Edward Batts	4:28
8.	"Get Ready (Lookin' for Loving)"	LaBelle; Ellison; Batts	4:54
9.	"Find the Love"	LaBelle; Ellison; Theodore McClean	5:43

2014 remaster
No.	Title	Writer(s)	Length
10.	"Release (The Tension)" (12" Disco Remix)	Toussaint	6:43

== Personnel ==
Performers and musicians

- Patti LaBelle – vocals
- Allen Toussaint – Yamaha electric grand piano, vocoder (3, 8), RMI Harmonic Synthesizer (8), acoustic piano (9)
- James "Budd" Ellison – acoustic piano
- Sam Henry Jr. – Fender Rhodes
- Edward Levon Batts – guitars, backing vocals
- Ron Smith – guitars
- David Barard – bass
- Herman "Roscoe" Ernest III – drums
- Miguel Fuentes – percussion
- Kenneth Williams – percussion
- Albert White – alto saxophone
- Carl Blouin – baritone saxophone
- Harold Deffies – baritone saxophone
- Paul McGinley – tenor saxophone
- James Rivers – tenor sax solo (1), alto sax solo (7)
- Jim Duggan – trombone
- Michael Genevay – trombone
- Jerome Verges – trombone
- Clyde Kerr Jr. – trumpet
- James Weber – trumpet
- Vernon Manuel – backing vocals
- Jay Van Hall – backing vocals

Technical

- Patti LaBelle – associate producer, album concept
- James Budd Ellison – associate producer
- Skip Godwin – recording, mixing
- Danny Jacobs – recording, mixing
- Jack Skinner – mastering at Sterling Sound (New York City, New York)
- John Berg – art direction, cover design
- Andrea Klein – art direction, cover design
- Hiro 51 – photography
- Shelly Tryer Broomfield – fashion consultant
- Norma Harris – hair stylist

== Charts ==
Chart performance for Released
Chart (1980)	Peak position
US Billboard 200	114
US Top R&B/Hip-Hop Albums (Billboard)	21
US World Albums (Record World)	96
US Black Oriented Charts (Record World)	31
US Top 100 Albums (Cashbox)	77
US Top 75 R&B Albums (Cashbox)	29
