= You Are My Friend =

Single by Patti LaBelle

from the album Patti LaBelle
- Released: 1978
- Recorded: The Automatt (San Francisco, California)
- Genre: R&B
- Length: 4:36
- Label: Epic
- Songwriters: Patti LaBelle; Armstead Edwards; James "Budd" Ellison
- Producer: David Rubinson

Patti LaBelle singles chronology
"Joy to Have Your Love" (1977)	"You Are My Friend" (1978)	"Dan Swit Me" (1978)

"You Are My Friend" is a ballad co-written and recorded by the American singer Patti LaBelle, released as the second single off her first solo album Patti LaBelle, in 1978 on the Epic label. While it only reached as high as number 61 on the Billboard Hot Soul Singles chart upon release, it has gone on to become one of the singer's signature ballads.

== Background ==
Patti LaBelle ended a fourteen-year association with Nona Hendryx and Sarah Dash as their group Labelle decided to break up at the end of 1976. Initially, Patti was reluctant to continue her career as a solo artist, despite her husband Armstead Edwards encouraging her to pursue it. LaBelle later wrote in her memoir, Don't Block the Blessings, that after seeing a marriage consultant and shrink that she finally decided to continue singing. The singer subsequently hired her husband to manage her affairs.

In 1977, LaBelle signed a solo contract with her former group's label, Epic Records, and decided to re-team with the producer of her last album, Chameleon, David Rubinson, to work on the project. Having wanted to return to recording R&B and soul material after years of being out ruled by her Labelle band mates and former manager Vicki Wickham, most of the material on her solo debut consisted of mid-tempo R&B songs and love ballads.

In the middle of recording the album, LaBelle happened to come across unfinished lyrics by her husband on a song titled "You Are My Friend", named so by Edwards due to his relationship with their son Zuri, who was four at the time. LaBelle and her musical director James "Budd" Ellison contributed with LaBelle adding lyrics and Ellison composing the music. It was the last song to be recorded for her debut album.

== Recording and composition ==
"You Are My Friend" was recorded at the Automatt in San Francisco. It is a soul ballad with gospel and pop elements and composed in E♭ major.

Ellison played piano on the recording, which included string arrangements. Unlike most of her recordings with Labelle, in which she sung in her full range, Patti softly crooned the verses, only belting out when it reached the bridge and chorus.

After the chorus, LaBelle and background vocalists, including the Waters sisters and members of the Valentinos (Bobby Womack's former family group) began leading a call and response vocal, influenced by gospel music ("I've been looking around / and you were here all the time").

== Reception ==
"You Are My Friend" was released as the second official single from Patti LaBelle in January 1978.

The first single, the mid-tempo disco-influenced "Joy to Have Your Love" had a strong response from R&B audiences, peaking at number 31 on what was then called the Hot Soul Singles chart, becoming her first solo chart entry.

However, "You Are My Friend" proved only to be a moderate success, peaking at number 61 for the week of January 28, 1978 and staying on the charts for just six weeks. "Joy to Have Your Love" spent fifteen weeks by comparison. The song failed to enter the Billboard Hot 100. The song was added to quiet storm airplay on radio stations, confirming its cult hit status.

== Live performances ==
Despite its moderate chart showing, the song earned a fan following due to LaBelle's gospel-influenced, high-spirited live performances of the ballad. It was the final song she performed at her first solo concert in London and was received with a standing ovation. Similarly, it was also the last song she performed while on her first solo TV performance on Don Kirshner's Rock Concert before leaving the stage.

Starting around 1984, LaBelle began including church choirs in the middle of the performance of the song, adding elements of "What a Friend We Have in Jesus". During this portion of the song, LaBelle would kneel down and belt. A 1984 Baltimore live taped show later aired on Showtime under the name Look to the Rainbow and released in 1985 featured LaBelle performing the song with a backing church choir.

In November 1985, on her NBC-TV special, The Patti LaBelle Show, the song was performed as a duet between her and Christian music artist Amy Grant. In 1991, a taped performance at the Apollo Theater had LaBelle kneeling down and at one point laying on the floor of the stage. She also performed the song on the Oprah Winfrey Show in 1994. She also performed the song at a state dinner for Bill Clinton a year later at the White House. She also performed the song at her 1998 Broadway concert.

In 2000, she performed an intense version of the song at The Essence Awards. In recent performances of the song, LaBelle performs it as a tribute to late beloved musical artists, with the artists being shown in a big screen behind her.

== Covers ==
One of the covers of the song was from singer Sylvester, recorded in San Francisco for his live album Living Proof. During the song, Sylvester was joined by the Weather Girls, who started off as Sylvester's backup singers, Two Tons Of Fun.

In 2003 gospel singer Shirley Caesar recorded the song for her album Shirley Caesar & Friends which featured Patti LaBelle on the recording. LaBelle re-recorded the song for her album The Gospel According to Patti LaBelle, in 2006, as a tribute to her deceased collaborator, James Ellison.

== Credits ==
- Lead vocals by Patti LaBelle
- Background vocals by James Gadson, Norma Harris, Ray Parker Jr., Rosie Casals, Sherri Barman, Yvonne Fair, Cecil Womack, Curtis Womack, Friendly Womack, Julia Waters & Maxine Waters
- Lyrics written by Patti LaBelle and Armstead Edwards
- Music written and arranged by James "Budd" Ellison
- Produced by David Rubinson
