= Love Has Finally Come at Last =

Single by Bobby Womack featuring Patti LaBelle

from the album Poet II
- Released: 1984
- Genre: R&B, pop
- Length: 5:36
- Label: Beverly Glen
- Songwriter: Bobby Womack
- Producers: Bobby Womack, Andrew Loog Oldham and James Gadson

Bobby Womack singles chronology
"Where Do We Go From Here" (1982)	"Love Has Finally Come at Last" (1984)	"It Takes a Lot of Strength to Say Goodbye" (1984)

Patti LaBelle singles chronology
"If Only You Knew" (1983)	"Love Has Finally Come at Last" (1984)	"Love, Need and Want You" (1984)

"Love Has Finally Come at Last" is a song composed by Bobby Womack and recorded by Womack and singer Patti LaBelle, released on Womack's Poet II, in 1984, released on Beverly Glen Records.

The first of three duets LaBelle recorded on Womack's album (the other duets being the minor hit, "It Takes a Lot of Strength to Say Goodbye" and "Through the Eyes of a Child", which featured LaBelle during the chorus and bringing up the rear of the song), it was the first U.S. release off the album and became a hit on the R&B charts becoming a second consecutive top ten R&B hit for LaBelle, then enjoying her then greatest success with the pop ballad, "If Only You Knew", topping the charts a few months prior to this song's release. LaBelle would have a third top ten hit that year with "Love, Need and Want You".

It was Womack's first top ten R&B hit since "If You Think You're Lonely Now", in 1981. Womack's brother Cecil Womack contributed to backing vocals in the song.

== Credits ==
- Lead vocals by Bobby Womack and Patti LaBelle
- Produced by Bobby Womack, Andrew Loog Oldham and James Gadson
