= Pieces of a Dream (Pieces of a Dream album) =

Studio album by Pieces of a Dream
- Released: 1981
- Studio: Sigma Sound, Philadelphia, Pennsylvania
- Genre: Jazz
- Length: 37:37
- Label: Elektra; Rhino
- Producer: Grover Washington Jr.

Pieces of a Dream chronology
Pieces of a Dream (1981)	We Are One (1982)

Professional ratings
Review scores
Source	Rating
Allmusic	2/5 stars

Pieces of a Dream is the debut studio album of jazz fusion group Pieces of a Dream released in 1981 by Elektra Records. The album rose to No. 37 upon the Billboard Top R&B Albums chart.

== Overview ==
The album was produced by jazz saxophonist Grover Washington Jr. The song "Warm Weather" reached No. 54 on the Billboard Hot R&B Singles chart.

== Track listing ==
No.	Title	Writer(s)	Length
1.	"Pieces of a Dream"	Pieces of a Dream	5:12
2.	"Warm Weather"	Pieces of a Dream	4:08
3.	"Steady Glide"	Pieces of a Dream	4:30
4.	"Touch Me in the Spring"	Pieces of a Dream	5:12
5.	"All About Love"	Pieces of a Dream	5:03
6.	"Easy Road Home"	Pieces of a Dream	4:00
7.	"Lovers"	Pieces of a Dream	4:09
8.	"Body Magic"	Pieces of a Dream	5:23

== Personnel ==
- Barbara Walker - vocals
- Rachelle Barnes - backing vocals
- Tamara Scott - backing vocals
- Bonita Taylor - backing vocals
- Curtis Harmon - drums
- Ralph MacDonald - congas, percussion
- James K. Lloyd - Fender Rhodes, piano, synthesizer
- Dexter Wansel - synthesizer
- Cedric A. Napoleon - bass, vocals
- William Schilling - guitar
- Richard Lee Steacker - guitar
- Grover Washington, Jr. - soprano saxophone
