= Do You Get Enough Love =

Single by Shirley Jones

from the album Always in the Mood
- B-side: "We Can Work It Out"
- Released: June 1986
- Recorded: 1986
- Genre: R&B
- Length: 3:42 (7" version); 4:46 (Album version)
- Label: Philadelphia International
- Songwriter: Bunny Sigler
- Producers: Bunny Sigler, Kenny Gamble

Shirley Jones singles chronology
"Do You Get Enough Love" (1986)	"Last Night I Needed Somebody" (1986)

"Do You Get Enough Love" is a 1986 R&B ballad by The Jones Girls vocalist, Shirley Jones. The single was a number-one hit on the U.S. R&B chart for two weeks. "Do You Get Enough Love" was written by Bunny Sigler and produced by Sigler and Kenny Gamble.
