= Love, Need and Want You =

1983 single by Patti LaBelle

Single by Patti LaBelle

from the album I'm in Love Again
- B-side: "I'm in Love Again"
- Released: January 1983
- Recorded: 1982
- Studio: Sigma Sound, Philadelphia, Pennsylvania
- Genre: Soul, Philly soul
- Length: 3:40 (single edit); 5:00 (album)
- Label: Philadelphia International
- Songwriters: Walter Sigler; Kenneth Gamble
- Producers: Walter Sigler; Kenny Gamble

Patti LaBelle singles chronology
"Love Has Finally Come at Last" (1982)	"Love, Need and Want You" (1983)	"It Takes a Lot of Strength to Say Goodbye" (1983)

"Love, Need and Want You" is a song recorded by American singer Patti LaBelle from her sixth studio album, I'm in Love Again (1983). The mid-tempo R&B song was written and produced for LaBelle by Bunny Sigler and Kenny Gamble, and was released in 1983 as the album's second single. Following the success of her breakthrough R&B hit, "If Only You Knew", the song peaked at number 10 on the US Billboard R&B chart. Like "If Only You Knew", the song features LaBelle singing the song at her mid-range whereas in previous songs prior to 1982, LaBelle mostly sang in a straightforward soprano voice.

== Samplings and covers ==
Songs that have sampled "Love, Need and Want You" include:

- "World So Cruel" (1996) by Flesh-n-Bone and Rev. Run of Run-DMC from Flesh-n-Bone's album T.H.U.G.S..
- "Dilemma" (2002) by Nelly and Kelly Rowland of Destiny's Child, which appeared on solo albums by both artists (Nellyville for Nelly and Simply Deep by Rowland), a Grammy Award-winning song that uses an interpolation. LaBelle also appears in the music video as Rowland's mother.
- "GhettoMusick" (2003) by Outkast from their double album Speakerboxxx/The Love Below. Parts of the song in between verses sampled "Love, Need and Want You", and LaBelle performs in both a re-recorded version and the music video.
- "Lay It Down" (2010) by Lloyd, which subsequently appeared in his 2011 album King of Hearts. Responding to its success, LaBelle was called to add in vocals for a remixed version of the song, released as "Lay It Down II: A Tribute to the Legends", which was dedicated to the late Teena Marie and a then-ailing Aretha Franklin.
- "Lullaby" (2015) by Ciara from her album Jackie.

In addition, Jaguar Wright covered the song for her debut album, Denials Delusions and Decisions.

== Charts ==
Chart (1983)	Peak position
US Billboard Hot R&B/Hip-Hop Songs	10

== Credits ==
- Lead vocals by Patti LaBelle
- Instrumentation by Sigma Sound Studio musicians
- Produced by Kenny Gamble and Bunny Sigler
