= It's Alright with Me =

Album by Patti LaBelle

Studio album by Patti LaBelle
- Released: March 2, 1979
- Studios: Total Experience (Hollywood, California); Different Fur (San Francisco, California); Alpha International (Philadelphia, Pennsylvania)
- Length: 53:56
- Label: Epic
- Producer: Skip Scarborough

Patti LaBelle chronology
Tasty (1978)	It's Alright with Me (1979)	Released (1980)

It's Alright with Me is the third studio album by American singer Patti LaBelle, released in 1979 via Epic Records. Produced by Skip Scarborough, the album was a success due to the popularity of the songs "Come What May" and "Music Is My Way of Life", the latter finding success on the dance chart.

== Critical reception ==
Professional ratings
Review scores
Source	Rating
AllMusic	2.5/5 stars
The Encyclopedia of Popular Music	3/5 stars
The New Rolling Stone Record Guide	3/5 stars

Rolling Stone wrote that the "sleek arrangements are too tight to allow the aimless vocal overkill that marred so many earlier performances, yet they're flexible enough to avoid formulas." The Bay State Banner thought that "sometimes [Labelle's] shrill yells and cries can wear on the ears, but the bulk of this album presents her most effectively, joining the past cosmic aura of the group Labelle with today's more earthy atmosphere."

== Track listing ==
All tracks produced by Skip Scarborough.

It's Alright with Me track listing
No.	Title	Writer(s)	Length
1.	"It's Alright with Me"	Skip Scarborough	4:16
2.	"My Best Was Good Enough"	Scarborough	2:47
3.	"What Cha Doin' to Me?"	Scarborough	3:46
4.	"Love Is Just a Touch Away"	James Ellison; Patti LaBelle; Scarborough	3:54
5.	"Love and Learn"	Scarborough	5:34
6.	"Deliver the Funk"	Wayne Lee Vaughn; Wanda Hutchinson	4:10
7.	"Come What May"	David Lasley; Allee Willis	4:05
8.	"You and Me"	Allee Willis; Franne Golde	3:50
9.	"Music Is My Way of Life"	Marti Sharron; Gerald Lee	8:12

2011 remaster
No.	Title	Writer(s)	Length
10.	"It's Alright with Me" (Single Version)	Scarborough	3:51
11.	"Music Is My Way of Life" (Single Version)	Sharron; Lee	3:19
12.	"Music Is My Way of Life" (Instrumental)	Sharron; Lee	5:52

== Personnel ==
Performers and musicians

- Patti LaBelle – lead vocals
- Michael Stanton – acoustic piano (1, 5, 9), Fender Rhodes (2–4, 8), clavinet (9)
- Ernest Straughter – Fender Rhodes (1, 5, 6, 9), acoustic piano (2–4, 8)
- Felton Pilate – synthesizers (6), synth solo (9)
- Wayne Vaughn – synthesizers (6)
- Skip Scarborough – acoustic piano (7), Fender Rhodes (7), horn and string arrangements
- Johnny Graham – guitars (1, 3, 8)
- John Rowin – guitars (1–6, 8, 9)
- Louis Russell – guitars (2), acoustic guitar (7)
- Spencer Bean – guitars (4, 6, 9)
- Wayne Douglas – bass (1, 3–5, 7, 8)
- Robert Russell – bass (2, 6, 9)
- Nate Neblett – drums
- Miguel Fuentes – glockenspiel (1, 3, 4, 8), triangle (1, 8), xylophone (1, 3, 8), percussion (2, 7), vibraphone (5)
- Munyungo Jackson – percussion (1–6, 8, 9)
- David Crawford – orchestra arrangements and conductor
- George Bohanon – horn contractor
- Charles Veal – string contractor
- Emma Coleman – additional backing vocals (1)
- The Waters [Julia, Luther, Maxine and Oren Waters] – backing vocals (1, 2, 4, 5, 7–9)
- Scherrie Payne – backing vocals (3, 6)
- The Wright Combination [Dianne and Michael Wright] – backing vocals (3, 6)

Technical

- James Budd Ellison – assistant producer
- Don Cody – recording, mixing
- Steve MacMillan – assistant engineer
- Jerry Williamson – assistant engineer
- Steve Mantoani – technical advisor
- Stacy Baird – technical assistant
- Ben O'Brien – technical assistant
- Stuart J. Romaine – mastering
- Sigidi Abdullah – music copyist
- Yvonne Brooks – production coordinator
- Janet Perr – art direction, design
- Paula Scher – art direction, design
- Bill King – photography
- Mixed at Different Fur Studios (San Francisco, California).
- Mastered at CBS Studios (New York City, New York).
- Don Cody – engineer, mixing, vocal recording
- Steve MacMillan – assistant engineer
- Jerry Williamson – assistant vocal engineer
- Steve Mantoani – technical advisor
- Stacy Baird – technical assistant
- Ben O'Brien – technical assistant
- Stuart J. Romaine – mastering at CBS Studios (New York City, New York)
- Sigidi Abdullah – music copyist
- James "Budd" Ellison – production assistant
- Yvonne Brooks – production coordinator
- Janet Perr – art direction, design
- Paula Scher – art direction, design
- Bill King – photography
- Sonia Bullock – hair stylist
- Patti Wilson – clothes stylist

== Charts ==
Chart performance for It's Alright with Me
Chart (1979)	Peak position
US Billboard 200	145
US Top R&B/Hip-Hop Albums (Billboard)	33
