= I Don't Go Shopping =

Single by Patti LaBelle

from the album Released
- B-side: "Come And Dance With Me"
- Released: 1980
- Recorded: 1980
- Genre: Soul; pop
- Length: 3:52
- Label: Epic
- Songwriters: Peter Allen; David Lasley
- Producer: Allen Toussaint

Patti LaBelle singles chronology
"Release (The Tension)" (1980)	"I Don't Go Shopping" (1980)	"The Spirit's in It" (1981)

Music video
- "I Don't Go Shopping" on YouTube

"I Don't Go Shopping" is a song written by Peter Allen and David Lasley originally recorded by Allen on his Bi-Coastal album released in 1980 by A&M Records. American R&B singer Patti LaBelle covered the song for her fourth studio album Released produced by Allen Tousaint and released by Epic in 1980. The song was issued as the second single, peaking at number 26 on the Hot Soul Singles chart in early 1981. She has performed the song since its release.

"Let's write a song about shopping," said David Lasley, a new collaborator and Peter thought to himself, oh God. "I don't go shopping" came the exasperated reply." So they wrote a song "I Don't Go Shopping".

== Critical reception ==
Upon release, "I Don't Go Shopping" received positive reviews from music critics. Winston-Salem Chronicle wrote With "Released" "Labelle dips back into her Blue Bell days for some soul searching out and out blues like ''I Don't Go Shopping'". Cashbox praised LaBelle's vocal delivery writing she "turns to what she does best here, stone blues" and the production, describing it as "underscored by subdued string arrangements and a touch of brass. Male backup chorus at the close is an added bonus" and called it a "spirited B/C chart contender."

== Chart performance ==
Prior to its release, LaBelle had charted seven singles on the Billboard R&B singles chart in the three years since beginning her solo career. Of the seven, only three of those singles had reached the top 40 but nothing higher than number 31.

For the week of July 5, 1980, "I Don't Go Shopping" reached its peak of number 26 on what was then the Hot Soul Singles chart, staying for 12 weeks, her longest charting single since "Joy to Have Your Love" and her biggest charting single since hit up until that point.

On the Cash Box R&B chart, it was her second biggest charting hit there, peaking at number 22, becoming her third top 40 hit on that chart.

== Weekly charts ==
Chart (1980)	Peak position
US Hot R&B/Hip-Hop Songs (Billboard)	26
US Black Contemporary Singles (Cash Box)	22

== Peter Allen version ==
The song was included on Allen's Bi-Coastal album and The Very Best of Peter Allen: The Boy from Down Under, a greatest hits album released in Australia in August 1992 by A&M Records.

=== Credits and personnel ===
Credits are adapted from album's liner notes.

- Peter Allen - Lead Vocals & Acoustic Piano
- Peter Allen - Acoustic Piano
- David Foster - Keyboards
- Dave McDaniel - Bass
- Ralph Humphries - Drums
- Lon Price - Alto Saxophone
- Erich Bulling - String Arrangement
- David Foster - Producer

== Cover versions ==
The song was released by David Lasley on his Demos album. It was covered by Scottish singer Lulu in 1982 on her album Take Me to Your Heart Again.
