= Delayed release =

A delayed release or late release may refer to:

- Delayed release (film), the delayed release of a film to the public
- Delayed release (pharmacology), oral medicines that do not immediately disintegrate and release the active ingredient(s) into the body
- [+delayed release], a distinctive feature given to affricate consonants in phonology
- Late release, a term associated with vaporware in software development
