= Tracy Hamlin =

American singer and song writer

- Born: Tracy Yvette Hamlin; Baltimore, Maryland, United States
- Genres: Funk, Jazz, R&B, Soulful House
- Occupations: Singer, songwriter, vocal coach, festival promoter
- Instrument: Vocalist
- Years active: 1986–present
- Website: www.tracyhamlin.com

Tracy Yvette Hamlin is an American singer - songwriter, owner of the Sweet Jazz Concert Series, CEO of the independent label, DMH Records, and host of Our Tv Network’s “The Tracy Hamlin Show”. After a stint as lead vocalist for smooth jazz group Pieces of a Dream, Hamlin now performs as a solo artist internationally. Hamlin has performed as a background vocalist for Gloria Gaynor. Tracy has also arranged vocals for Gaynor’s 2013 album entitled We Will Survive. Tracy Hamlin is a former Vice President of the Washington DC Grammy Chapter and formerly served on the Recording Academy’s National Board of Trustees. Most recently, Hamlin has been appointed Vice Chairperson for Loudoun County’s Visit Loudoun Board of Directors. Hamlin was previously Secretary, Treasurer, and Vice Chairperson of the Visit Loudoun Tourist Board in Loudoun County Virginia.

== Solo career ==
Hamlin released her first album, Seasons, in 2005 for independent label DMH Records. In 2009, Tracy released her second album, Better Days. The album's title song peaked at No. 1 UK Soul Charts. In 2011, Tracy released a single entitled Drive Me Crazy along with DJ Spen and Quantize Recordings. Drive Me Crazy made it to number 1 four different times during a four-month period on Traxsource. Tracy went on to release several albums entitled This Is My Life (2013), which also held the No. 1 position on the UK Soul Charts for two weeks, and No Limits (2015) which held the No. 1 position for five weeks on the UK Soul Charts. Since then, she has released dozens of House singles and EP’s such as You Bring Me Joy and Still Need Love, produced by Soulista and Glen Hornsborough respectively.

== Sweet Jazz Concerts ==
An ongoing project of Hamlin’s called Sweet Jazz Concerts, is a series of Jazz concerts based in Loudoun County Virginia. Sweet Jazz Concerts uses music as a catalyst to give back to the community via music scholarships and donations to local charities such as Loudoun Abused Women Shelter Pearls Empowerment and Students Without Mothers.

== DMH Records ==
DMH Records is the independent label run by Tracy and is the medium of release for Tracy’s five solo albums. Named after Tracy’s late mother Mrs. Dorothy Marie Hamlin, she runs the label based on the values of her mother.

DMH Artists and affiliated Artists: Tracy Hamlin, Rodney Shelton, Dalia Reid, Terry Phillips, Kevin Jones, Jarred Armstrong.

== The Tracy Hamlin Show ==
The Tracy Hamlin Show, hosted by Tracy herself is a weekly talk show that airs Mondays at 7:00 pm EST on Our TV Network which is based in Saint Croix and can be viewed on Roku TV, Apple TV, Android TV, Time Warner Cable, Amazon Fire TV, Tempo, 90 Latin Markets on Le Mega Mundial, and OURTV.network. The show consists of two interview segments with a small local business owner, two interview segments of a Music Industry Artist, and a vocal performance by Tracy Hamlin.

== Discography ==
Year	Band or Record Label	Title
2002	Pieces of a Dream (band)	Love's Silhouette
2004	Pieces of a Dream	No Assembly Required
2005	DMH Records	Seasons
2009	DMH Records	Better Days
2011	Quantize Recordings	Drive Me Crazy (single)
2013	DMH Records	This Is My Life
2015	DMH Records	No Limits
2015	Quantize Recordings	MacArthur Park EP
2016	Expansion Records	Just Talk To Me
2021	DMH Records	Christmas With You (single)
