= Joyride (Pieces of a Dream album) =

Studio album by Pieces of a Dream
- Released: 1986
- Recorded: 1985–1986
- Studios: Bill Schnee's, Hollywood, California
- Genres: Jazz, R&B
- Label: Manhattan
- Producers: Lenny White, Maurice White

Pieces of a Dream chronology
Imagine This (1983)	Joyride (1986)	Makes You Wanna (1988)

Professional ratings
Review scores
Source	Rating
Allmusic	2.5/5 stars
Philadelphia Inquirer	(favourable)

Joyride is an album by Pieces of a Dream issued in 1986 on Manhattan Records. The album reached No. 3 on the Billboard Traditional Jazz Albums chart and No. 18 on the Billboard Top Soul Albums chart.

== Critical reception ==
Jonathan Takiff of the Philadelphia Inquirer favourably found, "Producers Maurice (Earth, Wind and Fire) White and Lenny (no relation) White have done the decent window dressing, with best results on the crossover "Save Some Time for Me" and the scratchin' title track. For those who prefer the old Pieces, their instrumental treatment of the Wham! hit "Careless Whisper" and keyboardist James Lloyd's "Sunshine" are sweet and substantial in a mellow groove.

The Sun Sentinel also claimed, "This young Philadelphia trio is composed of men who, though barely in their 20s, have played together in a professional jazz combo for 10 years. This time out, Pieces of a Dream has added some funk and pop to its repertoire. There`s a strong jazz fusion touch."

== Track listing ==
Side One
No.	Title	Writer(s)	Length
1.	"Save Some Time for Me"	Curtis Harmon, James K. Lloyd, Cedric A. Napoleon, Lenny White	4:34
2.	"Say la La"	Charles McCambell, Bernard Wright	4:50
3.	"I Can Give You What You Want"	Curtis Harmon, Cedric A. Napoleon	4:33
4.	"Joy Ride"	James K. Lloyd, Cedric A. Napoleon, Lenny White	5:32

Side Two
No.	Title	Writer(s)	Length
5.	"Love of My Life"	Garry Glenn	4:26
6.	"Careless Whisper"	George Michael, Andrew Ridgeley	4:16
7.	"Outside In"	Curtis Harmon, James K. Lloyd, Cedric A. Napoleon	5:00
8.	"Winning Streak"	Garry Glenn, Dianne Quander	3:59
9.	"Sunshine"	James K. Lloyd	4:11

== Personnel ==
=== Musicians ===
- Randy Bowland - guitar
- Dennis Collins - backing vocals
- Garry Glenn - lead and backing vocals
- Curtis Harmon - drums, vocals, drum samples
- Bernard Wright, Henry Horne, Kaz Silver, Denise King - keyboards
- James K. Lloyd - percussion, keyboards
- Marlon McLain - guitar, percussion
- Chude Mondlane - percussion, backing vocals
- Lenny White, Maurice White - percussion
- Sybil Thomas - backing vocals

== Charts ==
Chart (1986)	Peak position
Billboard Top Pop Albums	105
Billboard Top R&B Albums	18
Billboard Top Jazz Albums	3

=== Singles ===
Year	Single	Chart positions
Year	Single	Hot R&B Singles
1986	"Joyride"	65
1986	"Say La La"	16
