= Patti LaBelle (album) =

Studio album by Patti LaBelle
- Released: August 19, 1977
- Studio: The Automatt (San Francisco, California); The Village Recorder (Los Angeles, California)
- Genre: Pop; soul
- Length: 59:02
- Label: Epic
- Producer: David Rubinson

Patti LaBelle chronology
Patti LaBelle (1977)	Tasty (1978)

Singles from Patti LaBelle
- 1. "Joy To Have Your Love" Released: September 1977; 2. "You Are My Friend" Released: January 1978

Professional ratings
Review scores
Source	Rating
AllMusic	3/5 stars
Rolling Stone	(favorable)

Patti LaBelle is the debut solo album by American singer Patti LaBelle, released in 1977, the first she recorded after sixteen years fronting the band Labelle. The album carried the dance hit, "Joy to Have Your Love", the classic gospel-inspired ballad, "You Are My Friend" and the mid-tempo, Angelo "Funky Knuckles" Nocentelli number, "I Think About You".

== Background and release ==
Prior to recording the album, LaBelle initially thought of retiring from the music industry after so many years as the lead singer of the hugely successful girl group Labelle. Following the group's March 1977 split, brought on by months of growing tension, LaBelle and her husband of eight years, Armstead Edwards, went to see a shrink over emotional distress in their marriage, which was partially due to the singer's fright over continuing a career without her group members. After further evaluation, LaBelle and her husband sorted out their differences. Edwards was then hired by his wife to be her manager as she carefully plotted her solo career. The singer traveled to San Francisco and Los Angeles to record her album, with David Rubinson, producer of Labelle's final album prior to their initial breakup, Chameleon, and also famed for his work with The Pointer Sisters.

Signing a solo contract with Epic Records, Labelle's former label, the singer released her debut album in October 1977. While the debuting single, "Joy to Have Your Love", became a minor R&B hit, and the dance number, "Dan Swit Me", was popular on the dance club circuit, the album's most notable song was a ballad co-composed by LaBelle, Edwards and LaBelle's musical director, James "Budd" Ellison, initially dedicated to LaBelle's and Edwards' only biological son, Zuri (who is now LaBelle's manager), titled "You Are My Friend". While the song only scaled the high sixties on the US Billboard R&B chart, it soon became one of her famous show-stoppers while performing the song. LaBelle performed the song at her first solo concert in London, getting a standing ovation, which helped to give LaBelle motivation to continue her career. The album, when released, performed successfully, reaching number 62 on the US Billboard 200 and number 31 on the R&B albums chart, while critics hailed the album.

== Track listing ==
1. "Joy to Have Your Love" (Jeffrey E. Cohen, Ray Parker Jr., James Budd Ellison) - 5:44
2. "Funky Music" (Barrett Strong, Norman Whitfield) - 6:24
3. "Since I Don't Have You" (Wally Lester, Joe VerScharen, Joseph Rock, James Beaumont, Jackie Taylor) - 5:40
4. "Dan Swit Me" (Jeffrey E. Cohen, Ray Parker Jr., David Rubinson, Armstead Edwards) - 5:50
5. "You Are My Friend" (Patti LaBelle, Budd Ellison, Armstead Edwards) - 4:36
6. "You Can't Judge a Book by the Cover" (Willie Dixon) - 4:22
7. "I Think About You" (Leo Nocentelli) - 4:30
8. "Do I Stand a Chance?" (Patti LaBelle, James Budd Ellison, Armstead Edwards) - 4:21
9. "Most Likely You Go Your Way (And I'll Go Mine)" (Bob Dylan) - 6:44

2011 Remaster

10. "Joy to Have Your Love" (Single Version) - 3:15
11. "Dan Swit Me" (Single Version) - 3:59

== Personnel ==
Performers and musicians

- Patti LaBelle – lead vocals, backing vocals, vocal arrangements
- James "Budd" Ellison – keyboards, musical direction
- Leo Nocentelli – acoustic piano (7), guitars
- Ray Parker Jr. – guitars, bass guitar, additional backing vocals (5)
- Mac Cridlin – bass guitar
- George Porter Jr. – bass guitar
- David Shields – bass guitar (2)
- James Gadson – drums, additional backing vocals (5)
- Natcho – harmonica
- David Rubinson – arrangements, vocal arrangements
- Cecil Womack – backing vocals
- Curtis Womack – backing vocals
- Friendly Womack Jr. – backing vocals
- The Waters Family [Julia, Luther, Maxine and Oren Waters] – backing vocals
- Sherri Barman – additional backing vocals (5)
- Rosie Casals – additional backing vocals (5)
- Yvonne Fair – additional backing vocals (5)
- Norma Harris – additional backing vocals (5)

Brass section

- Kurt McGettrick – brass arrangements (1, 3–5, 7, 8), saxophones (1, 3–5, 7, 8)
- Gary Herbig – saxophones and woodwinds (1, 3, 5, 7, 8)
- John Phillips – woodwinds (1, 3–5, 7, 8)
- Bill Napier – clarinet (4)
- Lew McCreary – trombone (1, 3, 5, 7, 8)
- Gordon Messick – trombone (4)
- Oscar Brashear – trumpet (1, 3, 5, 7, 8)
- Gary Grant – trumpet (1, 3, 5, 7, 8)
- Zane Woodworth – trumpet (4)
- Jim Self – tuba (1, 3, 5, 7, 8)
- Attilio DePalma – French horn (1, 3, 5, 7, 8)
- Sidney Muldrow – French horn (1, 3, 5, 7, 8)

String section

- Robert Manchurian and Dale Warren – orchestral arrangements and conductor
- Nathan Rubin – concertmaster
- Teresa Adams – string contractor
- Ellen Dessler, Thomas Elliot, Nancy Ellis, Ruth Freeman, Stephen Gehl, Theresa Madden, Mary Anne Meredith, Mischa Myers, Carl Pederson, Kazi Pitelka, Melinda Ross, Terri Sternberg, John Tenney and Emily Van Valkenburgh – string players

Technical

- David Rubinson – producer, engineer
- Jeffrey E. Cohen – associate producer
- Fred Catero – engineer
- Terry Becker – assistant engineer
- Chris Minto – assistant engineer
- George Horn – mastering at CBS Recording Studios (San Francisco, California)
- Vicki Gray – music copyist
- Paul Bevoir – logo design
- Collin Elliot – logo design
- Ricki Anderson – photography
- Ed Lee – album design
- Phyllis H. Berkowitz – album design

== Charts ==
Chart performance for Patti LaBelle
Chart (1977)	Peak position
US Billboard 200	62
US Top R&B/Hip-Hop Albums (Billboard)	16
US Top 75 R&B Albums (Cashbox)	5
US Top 100 Albums (Cashbox)	89
US World Albums (Record World)	10
