= Splashdown (Breakwater album) =

Studio album by Breakwater
- Released: 1980
- Recorded: 1979–1980
- Studio: Santa Barbara Sound Recording, Santa Barbara, California; Soundmixers, New York City
- Genre: Funk; funk rock; soul
- Length: 37:10
- Label: Arista
- Producer: Kae Williams Jr.; Rick Chertoff

Breakwater chronology
Breakwater (1978)	Splashdown (1980)

Splashdown is a studio album by Philadelphia funk soul band, Breakwater.

The album is most notable for containing the song "Release the Beast", which was sampled in "Robot Rock" by Daft Punk.

== Reception ==
In review issued on May 3, 1980, Billboard said that the music of the album "veers to the tired galactic rock concept a bit too much, but its sound is versatile and strong". For the week ending July 5, 1980, the album reached its peak position of number 34 on the Billboard Soul LPs chart.

== Track listing ==
All tracks composed by Kae Williams Jr.; except where noted.

Side A

1. "Splashdown Time" (Kae Williams Jr., James Gee Jones, Rick Chertoff, Vince Garnell) – (5:56)
2. "Love of My Life" – (4:25)
3. "Release the Beast" (Kae Williams Jr., Gene Robinson, Vince Garnell) – (4:57)
4. "The One in My Dreams" (4:44)

Side B

1. "You" (3:46)
2. "Say You Love Me Girl" (Kae Williams Jr., Gene Robinson) – (4:46)
3. "Let Love In" (4:40)
4. "Time" (3:56)

== Personnel ==
- James Gee Jones – drums, vibraphone, vocals
- Steve Green – bass, vocals
- John "Dutch" Braddock – congas, percussion, timbales
- Linc "Love" Gilmore – guitar
- Gene Robinson, Jr. – lead vocals, vocal arrangements, trumpet
- Kae Williams, Jr. – producer, vocals, synthesizers (ARP 2600, Mini-Moog, Prophet 5, ARP Omni), Fender Rhodes, piano, clavinet
- Greg Scott – tenor saxophone, alto saxophone, baritone saxophone, lyricon, horn arrangements
- Leonard "Dr." Gibbs, Jr. – timbales (track B2 only)
- Bill Reichenbach – trombone
- Gary Grant – trumpet
- Jerry Hey – trumpet
- Larry G. Hall – trumpet
- Linc "Love" Gilmore – vocals
- Vince Garnell – vocals, woodwind

=== Production ===
- Rick Chertoff – producer
- Don Murray – engineer
- William Wittman – engineer
- Daniel Protheroe – assistant engineer

=== Managerial and design ===
- Donn Davenport – art direction
- Gary Gross – photography

== See also ==
- "Robot Rock" (song), a 2005 Daft Punk song that samples "Release the Beast"
