= Pieces of a Dream (band) =

American musical group

- Origin: Philadelphia, Pennsylvania, U.S.
- Genres: Jazz fusion; funk; R&B
- Years active: 1976–present
- Labels: Elektra; Heads Up
- Members: James Lloyd; Curtis Harmon; David Dyson; Tony Watson Jr. Chris Harris; Elec Simon
- Past members: Cedric Napoleon; Gerald Veasley; Lance Webb; Vince Evans; Federico Pena; Tracy Hamlin; Ramona Dunlop; Ron Kerber; Eddie Baccus Jr. Michael Antonio Thornton; Norwood Young; Benjie Porecki; Cherie Mitchell; Bennie Sims; Leroy "Scooter" Taylor; Cliff Starkey; Rohn Lawrence; George Granville
- Website: piecesofadream.net

Pieces of a Dream is an American R&B and jazz fusion group.

== Overview ==
The group was formed in Philadelphia during 1976 by bassist Cedric Napoleon, drummer Curtis Harmon, and keyboardist James Lloyd who were all teenagers at the time. The group based their name on "Pieces of Dreams", a Michel Legrand tune recorded by Stanley Turrentine that they regularly performed. In 1981 Pieces of a Dream had a minor soul hit with "Warm Weather" with vocals by singer Barbara Walker and synthesizer by Dexter Wansel, which was recorded on Elektra Records and co-produced by Dexter Wansel. In late 1983, the group had their most successful single, "Fo-Fi-Fo", which peaked at No. 13 on the US soul chart. During their time with Elektra Records from 1981 to 1983, the group's first three albums were produced by saxophonist Grover Washington, Jr.

The single "What Can I Do", from the album 'Bout Dat Time, with Norwood on the lead vocals, peaked at No. 17 on the Billboard Hot R&B Singles chart in February 1990.

Tracy Hamlin was the group's lead vocalist from 2002 to 2005 and sings on two of their albums, Love Silhouette and No Assembly Required.

In 2006 the band invited saxophonist Tony Watson Jr. to work with them on their album ‘Pillow Talk’. Tony Watson Jr. has continued to play with the band and has since been made an official partner. In 2016 Tony Watson Jr. suggested they add percussionist Elec Simon, a musician Tony Watson Jr. knew since they were both located in Canton, Ohio.After the band came to see Elec perform with Tony, they invited Elec Simon to join and he has been a member ever since. Elec Simons’ first performance with the band was done in Dallas, Texas.

David Dyson has been the core bassist with the group from 2001 to the present and has also been a composer on No Assembly Required, Soul Intent, In The Moment, Just Funkin' Around, and Fired Up. Gerald Veasley and Scott Ambush have shared the bass chair intermittently as well.

Bassist Cedric A. Napoleon died in June 2024.

== Discography ==
=== Studio albums ===
| Year | Title | Peak chart positions | | | | | Record label |
| Year | Title | US | US R&B | US Jazz | US Con. Jazz | US Tra. Jazz | Record label |
|---|---|---|---|---|---|---|---|
| 1981 | Pieces of a Dream | 170 | 37 | 15 | — | — | Elektra |
| 1982 | We Are One | 114 | 22 | 4 | — | — | Elektra |
| 1983 | Imagine This | 90 | 16 | — | — | 4 | Elektra |
| 1986 | Joyride | 102 | 18 | — | — | 3 | Manhattan |
| 1988 | Makes You Wanna | — | 60 | — | 24 | — | Manhattan |
| 1989 | Bout Dat Time | — | 57 | — | — | — | Manhattan |
| 1993 | In Flight | — | 81 | 44 | 7 | — | Manhattan |
| 1995 | Goodbye Manhattan | — | — | 9 | 8 | — | Blue Note |
| 1997 | Pieces | — | — | 13 | 9 | — | Blue Note |
| 1999 | Ahead To The Past | — | — | 11 | 9 | — | Blue Note |
| 2001 | Acquainted With The Night | — | — | 20 | 12 | — | Heads Up |
| 2002 | Love's Silhouette | — | — | 16 | 8 | — | Heads Up |
| 2004 | No Assembly Required | — | — | 11 | 6 | — | Heads Up |
| 2006 | Pillow Talk | — | — | 8 | 4 | — | Heads Up |
| 2009 | Soul Intent | — | — | 11 | 5 | — | Heads Up |
| 2013 | In The Moment | — | — | 6 | 3 | — | Shanachie |
| 2015 | All In | — | — | 10 | 3 | — | Shanachie |
| 2017 | Just Funkin' Around | — | — | 6 | 2 | — | Shanachie |
| 2019 | On Another Note | — | — | — | 1 | — | Shanachie |
| 2021 | Fired Up | — | — | — | — | — | Shanachie |
| 2025 | We Got This | — | — | — | — | — | Shanachie |
"—" denotes the release failed to chart

=== Compilation albums ===
| Year | Title | Peak chart positions | | | | Record label |
| Year | Title | US Pop | US R&B | US Jazz | US Con. Jazz | Record label |
|---|---|---|---|---|---|---|
| 1995 | The Best Of.. | — | — | 31 | 19 | Blue Note |
| 2002 | Sensual Embrace - The Soul Ballads | — | — | 30 | 18 | Blue Note |
| 2004 | Sensual Embrace 2: More Soul Ballads | — | — | 16 | 11 | Blue Note |
| 2005 | Blue Note Trip: Jazzanova | — | — | — | — | |
"—" denotes the release failed to chart

=== Singles ===
| Year | Title | Chart positions | | | | Album |
| Year | Title | US | US Dance | US R&B | UK | Album |
|---|---|---|---|---|---|---|
| 1981 | "Warm Weather" | — | — | 54 | — | Pieces of a Dream |
| 1982 | "Mt. Airy Groove" | — | 55 | 33 | — | We Are One |
| 1983 | "Fo Fi Fo" | 107 | — | 15 | — | Imagine This |
| 1984 | "It's Time for Love" | — | — | 65 | — | Imagine This |
| 1986 | "Say La La" | — | — | 16 | 94 | Joyride |
| 1986 | "Joyride" | — | — | 65 | — | Joyride |
| 1988 | "Ain't My Love Enough" | — | — | 71 | — | Makes You Wanna |
| 1988 | "Rising to the Top" | — | — | 49 | 84 | Makes You Wanna |
| 1989 | "'Bout Dat Time" | — | — | 32 | — | 'Bout Dat Time |
| 1989 | "What Can I Do?" | — | — | 17 | — | 'Bout Dat Time |
"—" denotes the release failed to chart
