= Release (The Tension) =

Single by Patti LaBelle

from the album Released
- Released: 1980
- Recorded: 1980, New Orleans
- Genre: Post-disco, pop, boogie
- Label: Epic
- Songwriter(s): Allen Toussaint
- Producer(s): Allen Toussaint

Patti LaBelle singles chronology
| "Music Is My Way of Life" (1979) | "Release (The Tension)" (1980) | "I Don't Go Shopping" (1981) |

"Release (The Tension)" is a song recorded and released by singer Patti LaBelle as a single on the Epic label in 1980. The title track of LaBelle's fourth solo album, Released. It was written and produced by renowned New Orleans funk musician Allen Toussaint. LaBelle recorded the song in mid-range as the song produced a post-disco dance groove. The single failed to hit the Billboard Hot 100 and barely hit the R&B charts where it peaked at number 61 while it peaked at number 48 on the dance singles chart. It had some bigger success internationally reaching the top 20 on the Dutch charts. As a result of that success, LaBelle promoted the song on Dutch TV in the fall of that year.

== Charts ==
=== Weekly charts ===
| Chart (1980) | Peak position |
|---|---|
| Belgium (Ultratop 50 Flanders) | 6 |
| Netherlands (Dutch Top 40) | 6 |
| Netherlands (Single Top 100) | 12 |
| US Dance Club Songs (Billboard) | 48 |
| US Hot R&B/Hip-Hop Songs (Billboard) | 61 |

=== Year-end charts ===
| Chart (1980) | Position |
|---|---|
| Belgium (Ultratop Flanders) | 67 |
| Netherlands (Dutch Top 40) | 50 |
| Netherlands (Single Top 100) | 82 |
