= The Jones Girls =

American rhythm and blues group

- The Jones Girls in 1980. L-R: Brenda, Shirley and Valorie.

Background information
- Origin: Detroit, Michigan, United States
- Genres: R&B; soul; Philadelphia soul
- Years active: 1970–1993
- Labels: GM Records; Music Merchant; Paramount; Curtom; Philadelphia International; RCA; ARP
- Past members: Brenda Jones; Shirley Jones; Valorie Jones

The Jones Girls were an American R&B vocal trio of sisters from Detroit, Michigan, United States. Consisting of Brenda, Shirley and Valorie Jones, the Jones Girls first signed and recorded for GM Records in 1970. The trio were best known for their singles during the late–1970s through the 1980s; most notably 1979's "You Gonna Make Me Love Somebody Else". After a two–year tenure with GM, they then recorded for various labels before having success at Philadelphia International Records with Gamble & Huff.

== History ==
The group consisted of sisters Brenda (December 7, 1954 – April 3, 2017), Valorie (April 17, 1956 – December 2, 2001) and Shirley Jones (born September 22, 1953). They performed as backup singers for Lou Rawls, Teddy Pendergrass, Aretha Franklin, and Le Pamplemousse. They worked with Diana Ross from 1975 to 1978 and were the backup singers on Linda Clifford's 1978 album If My Friends Could See Me Now. They also performed on Tower of Power's disco-themed 1979 album Back on the Streets. Their biggest hit was "You Gonna Make Me Love Somebody Else". The song hit the Billboard Magazine Top 40 at number 38 in May 1979. The song was also a Top 5 R&B hit. It became a gold record. An additional hit followed in 1980, with the single "I Just Love The Man", charting at number 9 in January 1981. The less successful "Nights Over Egypt" (1981), written by Dexter Wansel, charted at R&B number 23 in 1982.

After the release and failure of their fourth U.S. album, On Target, lead singer Shirley Jones pursued a solo career and had a number 1 R&B hit on Billboard with "Do You Get Enough Love", from her top-ten debut album Always in the Mood (1986). "Do You Get Enough Love" was written by Bunny Sigler who also produced it with Kenny Gamble. Valorie Jones died on December 2, 2001, in Detroit, Michigan, at the age of 45. In 2007, Shirley Jones released an album Ladies Night Out together with Jean Carn and Cherrelle, on CD and DVD.

Brenda eventually moved to Atlanta, where she sang frequently with her four-piece band, performing both jazz and R&B numbers, including many Jones Girls' tunes. She later moved to New York after her children were grown, to have a more active performing and recording schedule. On April 3, 2017, Brenda was visiting her daughter in Wilmington, Delaware, and was hit by several cars and killed while attempting to cross the street. She was 62. Shirley continues to perform successfully as the Jones Girls with two of her nieces and a nephew on background vocals.

== Covers ==
"Who Can I Run To", from the band's self-titled 1979 debut album, was covered by Xscape in 1995. Their cover version became a number 1 R&B and number 8 pop hit. The original version was the B-side of "You Gonna Make Me Love Somebody Else".

"Nights Over Egypt" was covered by Incognito on their album No Time Like The Future, and by Dexter Wansel himself in 2019.

== Discography ==
=== Studio albums ===
Year	Album	Peak chart positions		Record Label
Year	Album	US	US R&B	Record Label
1979	The Jones Girls	50	8	Philadelphia International
1980	At Peace with Woman	96	7	Philadelphia International
1981	Get as Much Love as You Can	155	25	Philadelphia International
1983	On Target	—	59	RCA
1984	Keep It Comin'	—	—	Philadelphia International
1992	Coming Back	—	—	ARP
"—" denotes a recording that did not chart or was not released in that territory.

=== Compilation albums ===
- The Best of the Jones Girls (2000, The Right Stuff)
- Keeping up with the Joneses: The Early Years (2000, Sequel UK)

=== Singles ===
Year	Title	Peak chart positions				Certifications	Album
Year	Title	US	US R&B	US Dan	US A/C	Certifications	Album
1970	"My Own Special Way"	—	—	—	—		—
1972	"Come Back"	—	—	—	—		—
1972	"Your Love Controls Me"	—	—	—	—		—
1973	"Taster of the Honey (Not the Keeper of the Bee)"	—	—	—	—		—
1974	"If You Don't Love Me No More"	—	—	—	—		—
1974	"Will You Be There"	—	—	—	—		—
1975	"I Turn to You"	—	—	—	—		—
1975	"Hey Lucinda"	—	—	—	—		—
1979	"You Gonna Make Me Love Somebody Else"	38	5	12	—	RIAA: Gold	The Jones Girls
1979	"We're a Melody"	—	78	—	50		The Jones Girls
1980	"I'm at Your Mercy"	—	77	—	—		The Jones Girls
1980	"Dance Turned into a Romance"	—	22	—	—		At Peace with Woman
1980	"I Just Love the Man"	—	9	—	—		At Peace with Woman
1981	"Back in the Day"	—	—	—	—		At Peace with Woman
1981	"(I Found) That Man of Mine"	—	20	—	—		Get as Much Love as You Can
1981	"Nights Over Egypt"	—	23	—	—		Get as Much Love as You Can
1981	"Get as Much Love as You Can"	—	—	—	—		Get as Much Love as You Can
1983	"On Target"	—	43	—	—		On Target
1983	"2 Win U Back"	—	47	—	—		On Target
1984	"Better Things to Do"	—	—	—	—		Keep It Comin'
1992	"Sweet Ecstasy"	—	—	—	—		Coming Back
1992	"You Threw Our Love Away"	—	—	—	—		Coming Back
"—" denotes a recording that did not chart or was not released in that territory.
