= Shirley Jones (R&B singer) =

American R&B singer (born 1953)

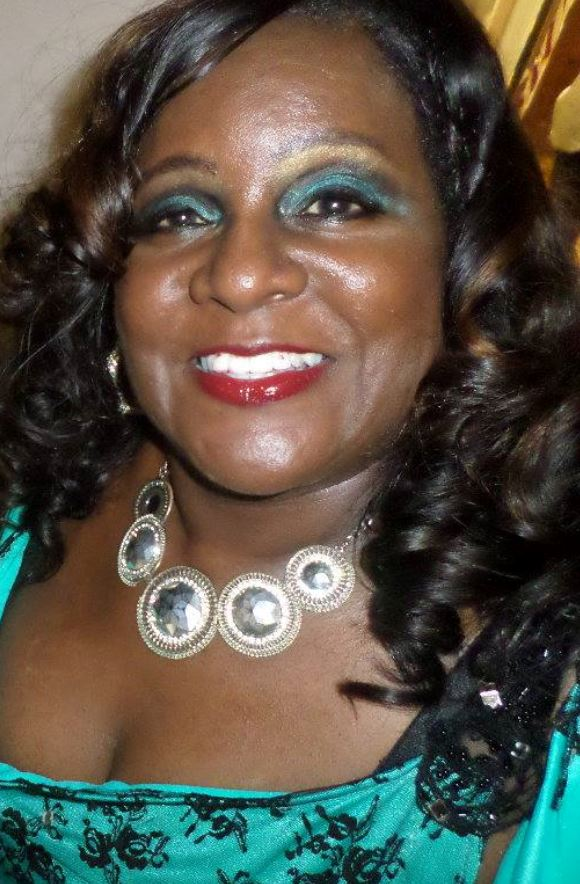
- Jones in 2015

Background information
- Born: September 22, 1953 (age 73); Detroit, Michigan U.S.
- Genres: R&B; disco; soul; funk
- Occupation: Singer
- Years active: 1970–present
- Labels: GM Records; Music Merchant; Paramount; Curtom; Philadelphia Int'l; RCA; ARP

Shirley Jones (born September 22, 1953) is an American R&B singer best known as a member and lead vocalist of The Jones Girls, who were a trio of sisters that had a number of hit singles in the late 1970s and early 80s. Shirley went on to have a solo career after the group disbanded in 1984.

== Career ==
Jones was born in Detroit, Michigan and began singing gospel as a child with her sisters, Brenda and Valorie, and her mother Mary Frazier Jones. Shirley and her sisters eventually began singing secular music as The Jones Girls, and signed their first recording contract with GM Records in 1970, releasing the single "My Own Special Way".

The Jones Girls became background singers for Diana Ross, Aretha Franklin, Teddy Pendergrass, and others.

In 1979, Jones and her sisters signed a recording contract with Philadelphia International Records and enjoyed a string of hit singles in the first half of the 1980s.

After the group disbanded in 1984, Jones was offered a solo contract with Philadelphia International Records, and released the hit single, "Do You Get Enough Love". The song spent 20 weeks on Billboard's R&B chart peaking at No. 1 on August 26, 1986. A full-length album followed entitled, "Always In the Mood" which peaked at No. 8 on Billboard's Top R&B Albums chart.

After the success of the single, Jones married Harlem Globetrotters basketball player Harold Hubbard.

Jones’s sister Valorie died on December 2, 2001, in Detroit, Michigan. She was 45. On April 3, 2017, Jones sister Brenda Jones, died at age 62 after being hit by several cars.

As of 2020, Jones resides in McDonough, Georgia and continues to tour around the country and overseas preserving the legacy of The Jones Girls.

== Discography ==
Solo

Albums

- "Always In the Mood" (Philadelphia International Records, 1986) U.S. #128, U.S. R&B #8
- "With You" (Diverse Records, 1994)

Singles

- "Do You Get Enough Love" (1986) U.S. R&B #1
- "Last Night I Needed Somebody" (1986) U.S. R&B #36
- "She Knew About Me" (1987) U.S. R&B #80
