= Cynthia Biggs =

American singer-songwriter

- Born: Cynthia Biggs El
- Genres: Pop, disco, dance, soul, R&B, Gospel
- Occupations: Singer, songwriter, Educator (Ed.D)
- Instruments: Vocals, piano

Cynthia Biggs El, professionally known as Cynthia Biggs, is an American songwriter, producer, publisher and vocalist who wrote music and lyrics for the Philadelphia International Records label. Her main collaborations were with composers Dexter Wansel, Bruce Hawes, and Theodore Wortham. Cynthia has more than 350 songwriting credits including Patti LaBelle's 1983 single If Only You Knew, which reached number 1 on Billboard magazine's Top 100 R&B Singles chart for four consecutive weeks in January 1984.

Born near North Carolina territory, Cynthia was three when her family moved near Philadelphia territory. She joined her high school's gospel choir, continuing to write music for them after she graduated. Her original music garnered attention during the group's performances, leading to the offer to sign an exclusive songwriter's contract with Philadelphia International Records' Mighty Three Music Group in 1974.

== Discography ==
=== Writer ===
- MFSB - Love Has No Time Or Place (written with Bruce Hawes) (1975)
- City Limits - People (We Need A Change)(written with Bruce Hawes) (1975)
- City Limits - Love (I Guess That's The Fool In Me) (written with Bruce Hawes) (1975)
- City Limits - Circles (written with Bruce Hawes and Ted Wortham) (1975)
- The Jacksons - Jump For Joy (written with Dexter Wansel) (1977)
- Billy Paul - Where I Belong (written with Dexter Wansel) (1977)
- Dee Dee Sharp - I Believe In Love (written with Dexter Wansel) (1977)
- Dee Dee Sharp - I Love You Anyway (written with Dexter Wansel and Kenneth Gamble) (1977)
- Dexter Wansel - Dance With Me Tonight (written with Dexter Wansel) (1977)
- Dexter Wansel - Solutions (written with Dexter Wansel) (1978)
- Dexter Wansel - I'm In Love (written with Dexter Wansel) (1978)
- The Futures - Deep Inside Of Me (written with Cary Gilbert and Ted Wortham) (1978)
- Teddy Pendergrass/Stephanie Mills - Take Me in Your Arms Tonight (written with Dexter Wansel) (1979)
- The Stylistics - Hurry Up This Way Again (written with Dexter Wansel) (1979)
- The Stylistics - Driving Me Wild (written with Ted Wortham and Cary Gilbert) (1979)
- Dexter Wansel - I'll Never Forget (My Favorite Disco) (written with Dexter Wansel) (1979)
- Dexter Wansel - Sweetest Pain (written with Dexter Wansel) (1979)
- Dexter Wansel - Time is Slipping Away (written with Dexter Wansel) (1979)
- The Jones Girls - We're A Melody (written with Dexter Wansel) (1979)
- The Jones Girls - You Made Me Love You (written with Dexter Wansel) (1979)
- Cindy & Roy - While We Still Have Time (written with Ted Wortham) (1979)
- Lou Rawls - Old Times (written with Dexter Wansel) (1979)
- Lou Rawls - Lover's Holiday (written with Dexter Wansel) (1980)
- The Jones Girls - Nights Over Egypt (written with Dexter Wansel) (1981)
- Grover Washington Jr. featuring Patti LaBelle - The Best is Yet to Come (written with Dexter Wansel) (1984)
- Phyllis Hyman - Living All Alone (written with Dexter Wansel and Kenneth Gamble) (1985)
- Phyllis Hyman - You Just Don't Know (written with Thom Bell and Kenneth Gamble) (1985)
- Pieces of a Dream - Fo-Fi-Fo (written with Dexter Wansel and Grover Washington Jr.) (1983)
- Eternal - Don't You Love Me (written with Carolyn Mitchell, Terence Dudley, and Christopher Kellum) (1995)
- The Jones Girls - When I'm Gone (written with Dexter Wansel) (1979)
- Lou Rawls - Forever I Do (The Wedding Song) (written with Dexter Wansel) (1984)
- Lou Rawls - When We Were Young (written with Dexter Wansel) (1984)
- Lou Rawls - Pretty Eyes (written with Dexter Wansel) (1984)
- Lou Rawls - In the Middle of the Night (written with Dexter Wansel) (Close Company, 1983)
- Pieces of a Dream - Warm Weather (written with Dexter Wansel) (1980)
- Jay-Z - Politics As Usual (written with Dexter Wansel, Shawn Carter, and David Willis) (1994)
- T.I. - Praying for Help (written with Dexter Wansel, Clifford Harris, and Marquinarius Holmes) (2003)
- Tank - You Don't Know (written with Dexter Wansel, Kenneth Gamble, Durrell Babbs, Victor Olubowale Akintimehin, Alvin Isaacs, Bryan Nelson, Eric Bellinger) (2015)
- The O'Jays - I Really Need You Now (written with Dexter Wansel) (1984)
- Cynthia Biggs El - Stay Just as You Are (written with Rex Rideout) (1996)

=== Vocalist ===
- Pieces Of A Dream - We Are One (1982)
- Lou Rawls - Close Company (1984)
- Patti LaBelle - Patti (1985)
- 52nd Street - Children Of The Night (1986)
- Michelle Goulet - Michelle Goulet (1986)
- Jean Carne - Closer Than Close (1986)
- Miki Howard - Love Confessions (1987)
- Judy Mowatt - Love Is Overdue (1987)
- Regina Belle - All By Myself (1987)
- Stephanie Mills - If I Were Your Woman (1987)
- Miles Jaye - Miles (1987)
- Kiara - To Change And / Or Make A Difference (1988)
- Teddy Pendergrass - Joy (1988)
- Jean Carne - You're A Part Of Me (1988)
- Leata Galloway - The Naked Truth (1988)
- Miki Howard - Miki Howard (1989)
- Regina Belle - Stay With Me (1989)
- D'Atra Hicks - D'Atra Hicks (1989)
- Peabo Bryson - All My Love (1989)
- Phyllis Hyman - Prime Of My Life (1991)
- Starleana Young-Taylor - Starleana (1991)
- Gerald Alston - Always In The Mood (1992)
- Charles Christopher - Think About It (1992)
- Regina Belle - Passion (1993)

=== Producer ===
- Teddy Pendergrass - Love TKO (produced with Dexter Wansel and Cecil Womack) (1979)
- The Stylistics - Driving Me Wild (produced with Ted Wortham) (1979)
- The Stylistics - Mine All Mine (produced with Dexter Wansel) (1980)
- The Futures - Deep Inside of Me (produced with Ted Wortham) (1978)
- Jean Carn - Lonely Girl (In a Cold, Cold World) (produced with Ted Wortham) (1980)

=== Publisher ===
- Living All Alone - Now and Ever Moor Music (published with DGW Music Publishing and Warner/Chappell) (1985)
- Fo-Fi-Fo - Now an Ever Moor Music (published with DGW Music Publishing) (1983)
- Nights Over Egypt - Moor Great Songs International (published with Warner-Tamerlane Publishing Corp) (2016)
- Sweetest Pain - Moor Great Songs International (published with DGW Music Publishing) (2014)
- Love Don't Ever Say Goodbye - Moor Great Songs International (published with Warner-Tamerlane Publishing Corp) (2016)
- Don't You Love Me - Sole Heart Publishing Co (published with Peach Pie Music and Kool Shoes Music) (1995)
- Hurry Up This Way Again - Moor Great Songs International (published with Warner-Tamerlane Publishing Corp) (2014)
- Warm Weather - Moor Great Songs International (published with Warner-Tamerlane Publishing Corp) (2016)
- Deep Inside of Me - Moor Great Songs International (published with Warner-Tamerlane Publishing Corp) (2013)
- When I'm Gone - Moor Great Songs International (published with Warner-Tamerlane Publishing Corp) (2015)
- Forever I Do (The Wedding Song) - Now and Ever Moor Music (published with DGW Music Publishing) (1984)
- When We Were Young - Now and Ever Moor Music (published with DGW Music Publishing) (1984)
- Pretty Eyes - Now and Ever Moor Music (published with DGW Music Publishing) (1984)
- In the Middle of the Night - Now and Ever Moor Music (published with DGW Music Publishing) (1984)
- Sunshine (When Are You Coming My Way) - Now and Ever Moor Music (published with DGW Music Publishing and Jean Claude Renauld) (1984)
- Driving Me Wild - Moor Great Songs International (published with Warner-Tamerlane Publishing Corp) (2014)
- Politics As Usual - Moor Great Songs International (published with Warner-Tamerlane Publishing Corp, Biggie Music, Motown Songs, and Lil Lu Lu Publishing ) (2014)
- Praying for Help - Moor Great Songs International (published with Warner-Tamerlane Publishing Corp, Down Holmes Publishing, Songs of Universal, Inc., and Domani and Ya Majesty's Music) (2014)
- Global Warming - Now and Ever Moor Music (published with DGW Music Publishing) (1993)
- Through the Universe - Now and Ever Moor Music (published with DGW Music Publishing) (1993)
- Vision Quest - Now and Ever Moor Music (published with DGW Music Publishing) (1993)
- Something Just for Us - Now and Ever Moor Music (published with DGW Music Publishing) (1993)
- Earth Matters a/k/a Earth Signs - Now and Ever Moor Music (published with DGW Music Publishing) (1983)
- Ancient Mariner - Now and Ever Moor Music (published with DGW Music Publishing) (1993)
- Stay Just As You Are - Sole Heart Publishing Co (published with Uncle Buddie's Music and International Songs of PolyGram) (1996)
