= Breakwater (band) =

American soul musical group

- Origin: Philadelphia, United States
- Genres: Funk
- Years active: 1971–1980, 2010–present
- Label: Arista
- Members: Gene Robinson; James Gee Jones; Lincoln 'Zay' Gilmore; Steve Green; Vince Garnell; Greg Scott; John 'Dutch' Braddock; Kae Williams Jr.

Breakwater is an American funk band from Philadelphia. The band released two albums: Breakwater in 1978, and Splashdown in 1980. The latter features the song "Release the Beast", which was sampled on "Robot Rock" by the electronic duo Daft Punk.

== Background ==
The band, originally from Philadelphia, was formed in 1971. The original members of Breakwater consisted of Gene Robinson, James Gee Jones, Lincoln 'Zay' Gilmore, Steve Green, Vince 'Garnel' Dutton, Greg Scott, John 'Dutch' Braddock, and Kae Williams, Jr. They were signed to the Arista label in 1978. Their second album Splashdown, which was released in 1980 has been referred to by Tom Bowker of the Broward Palm Beach New Times as a funk masterpiece.

== Releases ==
In September, 1979, their single "You Know I Love You", written by Greg Scott, and produced by Rick Chertoff was a Billboard top single pick.

=== "Release the Beast" ===
"Release the Beast" is the third song off of their second album Splashdown. The song has been sampled by the French house group Daft Punk on their song "Robot Rock". The song was also used by Reese's during their 2023 Halloween advertising campaigns.

== Later years ==
On October 16, 2014, the eleven-piece band with four man horn section played Warmdaddy's on S Columbus Blvd in Philadelphia. It was announced that the band and fellow seventies act Pockets, an R&B funk band from Baltimore, would appear at London's Brooklyn Bowl on January 7, 2017.

== Discography ==
US singles
Title	Release info	Year	Notes
"Work It Out" / "Feel Your Way"	Arista AS 0404	1979	
"No Limit" / "Feel Your Way"	Arista AS 0424	1979	
"You Know I Love You" / "Unnecessary Business"	Arista AS 0457	1979	
"Splashdown Time" / "Let Love In"	Arista AS 0518	1980	
"Say You Love Me Girl" / "Time"	Arista AS 0542	1980	
"Release the Beast" / "Time"	Arista AS 0565	1980	

US Albums
Title	Release info	Year	F	Notes
Breakwater	Arista AB 4208	1978	LP	
Splashdown	Arista AB 4264	1980	LP	
Breakwater	Get On Down GET-51269	2010	CD	
Splashdown	Get On Down GET-51268	2010	CD	
Breakwater / Splashdown	Expansion EXP2CD 49	2016	CD	Compilation
