= Record World (store) =

Music retailer in Long Island, New York

- Company type: Music retailer
- Industry: Music
- Founded: 1959
- Defunct: 1992
- Fate: Bankruptcy
- Headquarters: New York City, New York, United States
- Products: Records, cassette tapes, compact discs

Record World was a record store chain (often listed as TSS/Record World; TSS is an abbreviation for Times Square Stores) that operated out of many locations in New York during the 1970s and 1980s. It was headquartered on Long Island.

== History ==
Record World/Square Circle music stores were opened in 1959 in New York. The chain of record stores eventually expanded to Washington D.C., Virginia, and Sawgrass Mills, Florida.

In 1978, the store chain was operated by Elroy Distributors, and presented Harry Chapin with a $1,000 check for the World Hunger Organization. By 1980, Record World had a total of 32 stores opened, and had expanded the company's warehouse in Freeport, New York, from 1,500 square feet to 20,000 feet.

In 1982, Roy Imber was the operator of the stores, of which there were 40 operating in the U.S. Northeast. The same year, Record World was part of a "one sided single" campaign by CBS Records. In 1984, the chain was presented with gold album plaques for the hit Pointer Sisters album, Break Out. Throughout the Mid-80s, the chain continued to expand, having 66 stores open by 1986. That holiday season, the chain expanded its budget for radio and TV advertising. The first Square Circle store opened in the Garden State Plaza in Paramus, New Jersey in 1986.

Some malls that Record World stores were located in included Roosevelt Field Mall, Green Acres Mall, and Stamford Town Center however, many of the Record World stores were closed by 1989, and by 1990, the chain was completely defunct, due to TSS filing for bankruptcy. In 1992, three Record World locations were acquired by MCD Records & Tapes. Record World was purchased by W.H. Smith after declaring bankruptcy in 1992 and later rebranded The Wall the following year.
