= Joseph Tarsia =

American recording studio owner and engineer

Joe Tarsia
- Tarsia in 1981
- Born: Joseph Dominick Tarsia; September 23, 1934; Philadelphia, Pennsylvania, U.S.
- Died: November 1, 2022 (aged 88)
- Education: Edward W. Bok Technical High School
- Occupation: Recording engineer
- Years active: 1960s–1990s
- Known for: Recording Philadelphia soul music, starting Sigma Sound Studios

Joseph Dominick Tarsia (September 23, 1934 – November 1, 2022) was an American recording studio owner and engineer from Philadelphia who was credited on many classic pop music tracks. He received over 150 gold and platinum record awards. He was the founder and owner of the Sigma Sound Studios, which was the recording base of Gamble and Huff's Philadelphia International Records. Tarsia's recordings between the 1960s and 1980s were noteworthy for their clarity and aural definition, achieved years before the digital era.

== Career ==
Tarsia took technical courses in high school before taking a position with the research department of Philco, which lasted for a decade. Later he became a service technician for various Philadelphia recording studios. He traveled to New York City to mix with top audio engineers. Around 1961, he took an audio engineering position at Cameo-Parkway Records' studio. The record label's artist roster included Chubby Checker, Bobby Rydell, The Orlons, The Tymes, Dee Dee Sharp, The Dovells, and Bunny Sigler. Tarsia became the record label's chief engineer.

In the fall of 1967, Tarsia sold his car, house, and other personal possessions to purchase a lease on the former Reco-Art Studios located on the second floor of the building at 212 North 12th Street in Philadelphia. He upgraded the studio equipment from 2-track to 8-track and opened the studio, which he renamed Sigma Sound, on August 5, 1968, operating as a one-man operation. During the 1970's gold- and multi-platinum heyday of "The Sound Of Philadelphia", the facility became a 24-hour operation to meet the great demand for its services. Sigma Sound won awards for recordings by Jerry Butler, Harold Melvin & the Blue Notes, The O'Jays, The Stylistics, and many others. Musicians who recorded there included Stevie Wonder, B.B. King, David Bowie, and the Four Tops.

By 1976, the Philadelphia studios' success prompted Tarsia to open an additional 3-room recording facility in New York City, appropriately named Sigma Sound Studios of New York. The client list of the New York location included Whitney Houston, Madonna, Billy Joel, Steely Dan, Ashford and Simpson, and Paul Simon. Tarsia sold the New York studios in 1988.

In 1990, Tarsia's son Michael (Mike) Tarsia became president of Sigma Sound Studios. Joe Tarsia became a lecturer and participant in educational programs including GRAMMY In The Schools. In 2003, he sold the studio's Philadelphia location, but it still retained the Sigma Sound Studios name. Tarsia won many awards for his activities. He founded and chaired the Society of Professional Audio Recording Services (SPARS), and was a trustee of the National Academy of Recording Arts and Sciences. In 2016, he was inducted into the Musicians Hall of Fame and Museum. Tarsia died on November 1, 2022, at the age of 88.
