= Dexter Wansel =

American R&B and jazz fusion singer (1950–2026)

- Born: Dexter Gilman Wansel; August 22, 1950; Philadelphia, Pennsylvania, U.S.
- Died: May 31, 2026 (aged 75)
- Genres: Jazz, jazz fusion, R&B
- Occupations: Record producer, songwriter, arranger
- Instrument: Keyboards
- Years active: 1963–2025
- Labels: Philadelphia International, Digital Jukebox
- Website: www.dexterwanselofficial.com

Dexter Gilman Wansel (August 22, 1950 – May 31, 2026) was an American R&B and jazz fusion singer, arranger, musician, composer, conductor, synthesist and A&R director.

== Early life ==
Dexter Wansel was born in Philadelphia on August 22, 1950. He began as an errand boy backstage at the Uptown Theater in Philadelphia from 1959 through 1963 for his step-uncle Georgie Woods. There he met many great artists who encouraged him to pursue music. During high school, he and his friend, Stanley Clarke, performed in bands together.

== Career ==
In 1970, after being honourably discharged from the United States Army, Wansel quietly joined the ranks of synthesists like Wendy Carlos and Dick Hyman, when he began programming the EMS VCS 3 'Putney' and the ARP 2600 for sessions at Sigma Sound Studios both credited and uncredited. From the early to mid 1970s, Wansel also played keyboards for groups such as Instant Funk, Yellow Sunshine, and MFSB. After signing with Philadelphia International Records, as in-house songwriter/producer/arranger, he established a songwriting relationship with the lyricist Cynthia Biggs.

He also collaborated with other writers such as Bunny Sigler, T. Life, Vinnie Barrett and Kenneth Gamble. Wansel produced, wrote, arranged, played keyboards and synthesized hits for artists at Philadelphia International Records as well as numerous other labels. In 1977, he produced the Grammy-winning album Unmistakably Lou by Lou Rawls.

Wansel's music has been used as samples in the world of hip-hop. His 1975 "Theme from The Planets" drum beat intro, is hailed as being one of the first foundation beats of hip-hop. This beat continues to be sampled today and can also be heard on television commercials and in movies. His sampled music has been used by The Lox, Kanye West, Kendrick Lamar, Lil Wayne, Drake, Rick Ross, J Cole, Eric B and Rakim, Wiz Khalifa, Lil Kim, Ice-T and Ice Cube.

In 1979 as conductor of the world-famous MFSB Orchestra, Wansel was the music director/conductor for the historic show at the White House commemorating the very first 'Black Music History Month' celebration in 1978. From 1978 through 1980, Dexter Wansel was the A+R Director for Philadelphia International Records where he oversaw many album releases by the label's artists including MFSB'S Mysteries of the World, and the Stylistics, Hurry Up This Way Again, under the direction of Gamble and Huff. His LP Time Is Slipping Away, recorded in 1979, produced his second disco-themed hit (his first was "Disco Lights" in 1977) called "(I'll Never Forget) My Favorite Disco" co-written by Cynthia Biggs. It proved to be highly successful on the US club scene.

In 1981, he wrote and arranged the song Nights Over Egypt for the Jones Girls.

In April 2021, Wansel signed a new record deal with Digital Jukebox Records.

In June 2026, a live tribute in honour of his space-funk album Life on Mars will be held as part of "Blacktronika: Philadelphia Now and Then", curated by King Britt.

== Influence on Jamiroquai ==
Jay Kay of Jamiroquai said that his love for jazz and funk was kickstarted when he was around fourteen or fifteen years old by Wansel's "Life on Mars", with Kay recalling on a BBC interview guest spot that he used to play the song over and over again on repeat with a friend.

== Personal life and death ==
Wansel was the father of Grammy-nominated music producer and songwriter Pop Wansel; additionally, he was a U.S. Army Veteran of the Vietnam War era (Taiwan). He authored a novel entitled Shortwave, published in 2011.

He was the brother of author Teri Woods.

Wansel died on May 31, 2026, at the age of 75.

== Discography ==
=== Studio albums ===
Year	Album	Chart positions			Record label
Year	Album	US	US R&B	US Jazz	Record label
1976	Life On Mars	—	44	—	Philadelphia International Records
1977	What the World Is Coming To	168	45	24	Philadelphia International Records
1978	Voyager	139	37	—	Philadelphia International Records
1979	Time Is Slipping Away	—	58	—	Philadelphia International Records
1986	Captured	—	—	—	10 Records
2004	Digital Groove World	—	—	—	Hotplanet Entertainment
2021	The Story of the Flight Crew to Mars	178	40	—	Digital Jukebox Records
"—" denotes the album failed to chart

=== Singles ===
Year	Single	Chart positions		Record label
Year	Single	US Dance	US R&B	Record label
1976	"Life On Mars"	10	91	Philadelphia International Records
1977	"Disco Lights"	25	—	Philadelphia International Records
1978	"Solutions"	—	87	Philadelphia International Records
1979	"It's Been Cool"	—	91	Philadelphia International Records
1979	"The Sweetest Pain"	—	40	Philadelphia International Records
2021	"As One" (featuring Terry Dexter)	—	71	Digital Jukebox Records
2022	"This Is My Story" (featuring Damon Williams)	—	64	Digital Jukebox Records
"—" denotes the single failed to chart

=== Selected production discography ===
- The Jacksons - The Jacksons, 1976
- Lou Rawls - All Things in Time, 1976
- The Jacksons - Goin' Places, 1977
- Lou Rawls - Unmistakably Lou. 1977
- Lou Rawls - Let Me Be Good to You, 1979
- Teddy Pendergrass - TP, 1980
- Lou Rawls - Sit Down and Talk to Me, 1980
- Patti LaBelle - The Spirit's in It, 1981
- Grover Washington Jr. - The Best Is Yet to Come, 1982
- Patti LaBelle - I'm in Love Again, 1983
- Patti LaBelle - Patti, 1983
- Phyllis Hyman - Living All Alone, 1986
- MFSB - Philadelphia Freedom, 1975
- MFSB - Mysteries Of The World, 1980
- The Jones Girls - The Jones Girls, 1979
- Dee Dee Sharp Gamble - What Color Is Love, 1977
