= Keith Richards discography =

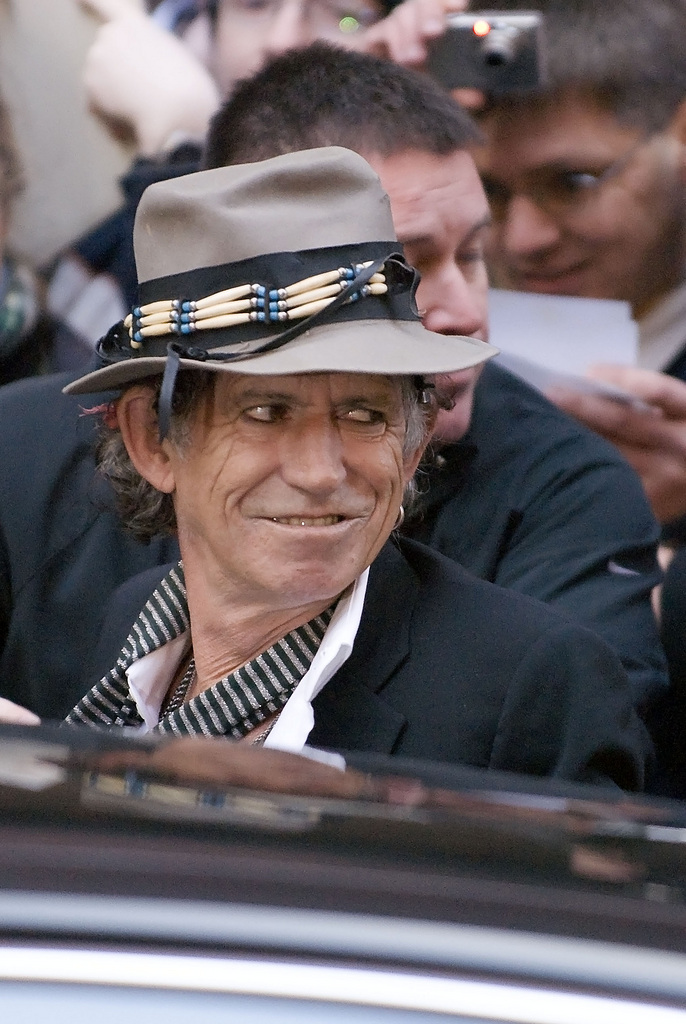
- Richards leaving the press conference of "Shine A Light" at the Hyatt Hotel, Potsdamer Platz, Berlin
- Studio albums: 3
- Live albums: 1
- Compilation albums: 1
- Singles: 12
- Music videos: 7
- Other appearances: 4

Keith Richards is a British recording artist, most famous for his songwriting partnership with Mick Jagger, and their over-sixty-year tenure with their band the Rolling Stones. Richards has recorded and released three studio albums, one live album, one compilation album, ten singles and seven music videos since 1978.

Richards has primarily worked as a session player and producer outside of the Rolling Stones, having performed on dozens of other artists' records since 1969. He began his solo recording career in 1978 with the single "Run Rudolph Run", before releasing his debut album ten years later.

On his solo albums, Richards' backing band is credited as the X-Pensive Winos, which most prominently features drummer Steve Jordan (who also serves as Richards' co-writer and co-producer), and also includes keyboardist Ivan Neville and guitarist Waddy Wachtel.

== Albums ==
=== Studio albums ===
List of studio albums, with selected chart positions
Title	Details	Peak chart positions								Certification
Title	Details	UK	AUS	AUT	GER	NLD	SWE	SWI	US	Certification
Talk Is Cheap	1988	37	15	20	15	37	12	18	24	US: Gold; CA: Gold
Main Offender	1992	45	96	22	4	55	43	13	99	
Crosseyed Heart	2015	7	15	1	3	4	7	4	11	

=== Live and compilation albums ===
Title	Year	Peak chart positions			Notes
Title	Year	AUS	AUT	GER	Notes
Live at the Hollywood Palladium, December 15, 1988 (with the X-Pensive Winos)	1991	169	49	30	Live
Vintage Vinos	2010	—	—	—	Compilation

== Singles ==
Release date	Title	Peak chart positions					Album
Release date	Title	UK Airplay	AUS	MEX Eng.	US Main. Rock	US AAA	Album
December 1978	"Run Rudolph Run" b/w "The Harder They Come"	—	—	—	—	—	Non-album single
October 1988	"Take It So Hard"	—	95	—	3	—	Talk Is Cheap
November 1988	"You Don't Move Me"	—	—	—	18	—	Talk Is Cheap
February 1989	"Struggle"	—	—	—	47	—	Talk Is Cheap
1989	"Make No Mistake"	—	167	—	—	—	Talk Is Cheap
October 1992	"Wicked as It Seems"	—	136	—	3	—	Main Offender
January 1993	"Eileen"	—	—	—	17	—	Main Offender
1993	"Hate It When You Leave"	—	143	—	—	—	Main Offender
December 2007	"Run Rudolph Run" b/w "Pressure Drop"	—	—	68	—	—	re-issue A-side with non-album B-side
August 2015	"Trouble"	64	—	49	—	20	Crosseyed Heart
November 2015	"Heartstopper"	—	—	46	—	—	Crosseyed Heart
March 2024	"I'm Waiting for the Man"	—	—	—	—	—	The Power of the Heart: A Tribute to Lou Reed
September 2026	"Bright Lights, Big City"	—	—	—	—	—	Grand Theft Auto VI: The Album
"—" denotes releases that did not chart

=== Other appearances ===
Year	Song	Album	Notes
1985	"Silver & Gold"	Sun City	with Bono and Ronnie Wood
2001	"You Win Again"	Timeless	Hank Williams cover
2005	"Hurricane"	N/A	charity single, originally credited to the Rolling Stones
2021	"Like a Locomotive"	Party for Joey: Sweet Relief Tribute to Joey Spampinato	with Ben Harper

== Guest appearances ==
=== Studio ===
Year	Artist	Release	Role
1969	Billy Preston	That's the Way God Planned It	bass
1974	Ronnie Wood	I've Got My Own Album to Do	writing, guitar, vocals, piano
1975	Ronnie Wood	Now Look	guitar and backing vocals
1978	Peter Tosh	Bush Doctor	guitar and production
1979	Ronnie Wood	Gimme Some Neck	backing vocals and guitar
1979	Ian McLagan	Troublemaker	guitar and backing vocals on "Truly"
1981	Max Romeo	Holding Out My Love for You	guitar and mixing
1985	Nona Hendryx	The Heat	guitar on "Rock This House"
1985	Tom Waits	Rain Dogs	guitar and backing vocals
1985	Phantom, Rocker & Slick	Phantom, Rocker and Slick	guitar on "My Mistake"
1986	Aretha Franklin	Aretha	guitar and production on "Jumpin' Jack Flash"
1987	The Neville Brothers	Uptown	guitar
1988	Feargal Sharkey	Wish	guitar on "More Love"
1988	Ziggy Marley	Conscious Party	guitar on "Lee & Molly"
1988	The Dirty Strangers	The Dirty Strangers	guitar
1990	Bernie Worrell	Funk of Ages	guitar
1991	Johnnie Johnson	Johnnie B. Bad	guitar, vocals, writing, production
1991	John Lee Hooker	Mr. Lucky	guitar and backing vocals
1992	Tom Waits	Bone Machine	guitar, vocals, and writing on "That Feel"
1992	Hal Willner	Weird Nightmare: Meditations on Mingus	vocals, guitar on "Oh Lord, Don't Let Them Drop That Atomic Bomb on Me"
1994	Bobby Womack	Resurrection	guitar
1994	George Jones	The Bradley Barn Sessions	guitar and vocals on "Say It's Not You"
1994	Marianne Faithfull	A Collection	guitar and production on "Ghost Dance"
1995	The Chieftains	Long Black Veil	guitar on "The Rocky Road to Dublin"
1995	Ivan Neville	Thanks	guitar
1996	Bo Diddley	A Man Amongst Men	guitar on "Bo Diddley Is Crazy"
1997	Scotty Moore	All the King's Men	guitar and vocals on "Deuce and a Quarter"
1997	Wingless Angels	Wingless Angels	guitar, backing vocals, production
1997	B.B. King	Deuces Wild	guitar on "Paying the Cost to Be the Boss"
1999	The Jimmy Rogers All-Stars	Blues Blues Blues	guitar
2000	Charlie Watts & Jim Keltner	Charlie Watts/Jim Keltner Project	guitar on "The Elvin Suite"
2001	John Phillips	Pay Pack & Follow	guitar, backing vocals, production
2002	Peter Wolf	Sleepless	guitar and vocals on "Too Close Together"
2004	Ivan Neville	Scrape	guitar
2004	Toots & the Maytals	True Love	guitar and vocals on "Careless Ethiopians"
2005	Les Paul & Friends	American Made World Played	guitar on "Good Morning Little Girl"
2005	Buddy Guy	Bring 'Em In	guitar on "The Price You Gotta Pay"
2005	Hubert Sumlin	About Them Shoes	guitar and vocals
2006	Ronnie Spector	Last of the Rock Stars	guitar and vocals
2006	Jerry Lee Lewis	Last Man Standing	guitar and vocals on "That Kind of Fool"
2008	Lee "Scratch" Perry	Scratch Came Scratch Saw Scratch Conquered	guitar
2008	Marianne Faithfull	Easy Come, Easy Go	guitar and harmony vocals on "Sing Me Back Home"
2009	The Dirty Strangers	West 12 to Wittering	piano and writing
2011	Ben Waters	Boogie 4 Stu: A Tribute to Ian Stewart	guitar and vocals
2011	Tom Waits	Bad as Me	guitar and vocals
2012	Lou Pallo	Thank You Les	guitar and vocals on "It's Been a Long, Long Time"
2012	K'naan	"Sleep When I Die"	guitar, bonus track from Country, God or the Girl
2018	Buddy Guy	The Blues Is Alive and Well	guitar on "Cognac"
2019	Sheryl Crow	Threads	guitar on "The Worst"

=== Live ===
Year	Artist	Release	Role
1999	Sheryl Crow	Sheryl Crow and Friends: Live from Central Park	guitar and vocals on "Happy"
2000	Faces	The Faces' Final Concert	guitar
2002	Willie Nelson & Friends	Stars & Guitars	guitar and vocals on "Dead Flowers"
2004	Willie Nelson & Friends	Outlaws and Angels	guitar and vocals
2007	Ronnie Wood & Friends	The First Barbarians: Live From Kilburn	guitar, keyboards, vocals

=== Outtakes ===
- Screamin' Jay Hawkins – Portrait of a Man: A History of Screamin' Jay Hawkins (1995) – guitar on "I Put a Spell on You" and "Armpit #6"
- Alexis Korner – Musically Rich...and Famous: Anthology 1967–1982 (2003) – guitar on "Get Off of My Cloud" (recorded 1974 or 1975)
- George Jones – Burn Your Playhouse Down – The Unreleased Duets (2008) – lead vocals on "Burn Your Playhouse Down" (recorded in 1994)

== Music videos ==
Year	Title	Director	Album
1988	"Take It So Hard"	Larry Williams	Talk Is Cheap
1989	"Make No Mistake"	Paula Greif	Talk Is Cheap
1992	"Wicked as It Seems"	Mark Romanek	Main Offender
1992	"Eileen"	Jim Gable	Main Offender
2015	"Love Overdue"	Sam Burton and George Coffee	Crosseyed Heart
2020	"Hate It When You Leave"	Jacques Naudé	Main Offender
2024	"I'm Waiting for the Man"	Jane Rose	The Power of the Heart: A Tribute to Lou Reed

== See also ==
- The Dirty Mac
- The New Barbarians
