= Nona Hendryx discography =

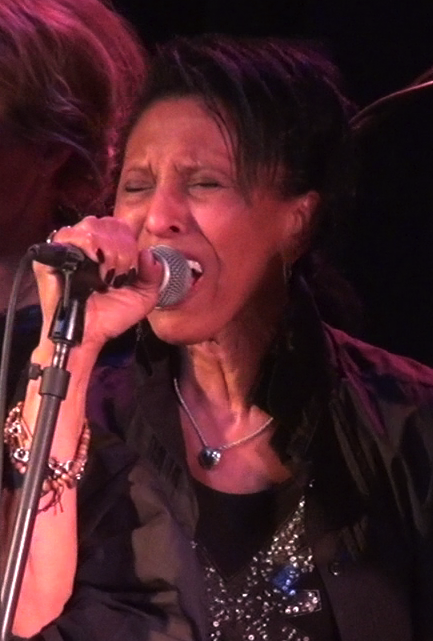
- Hendryx performing in 2011
- Studio albums: 7
- EPs: 1
- Compilation albums: 2
- Singles: 27
- Collaborative albums: 3

American singer Nona Hendryx has released seven studio albums, three collaborative albums, two compilation albums, one extended play, and twenty-seven singles (including six as a featured artist). After the disbandment of Labelle, Hendryx pursued a solo career and released her self-titled debut solo album on Epic Records in 1977. Following the disappointment of her debut album, she left Epic Records and briefly joined Arista Records in 1979 where she released three singles: "You're the Only One That I Ever Needed", "Love It", and "Snakes Alive".

In April 1983, she released her second album Nona on RCA Records. The album experienced moderate success, peaking at number 83 on the US Billboard 200 and number 25 on the Top Black LPs chart. The album featured a minor crossover hit "Keep It Confidential", which peaked in the top thirty on the US Hot Black Singles and Hot Dance Club Play charts and number 91 on the Billboard Hot 100. Her follow-up album, The Art of Defense (1984), spawn the Top 40 dance singles "I Sweat (Going Through The Motions)" and "To the Bone". By the time she released her fourth album The Heat in 1985, RCA Records began experience financial issues and there was little promotion for the album. She left RCA Records and joined EMI Records for the release of one album Female Trouble (1987). The album's lead single "Why Should I Cry?" became her highest-charting single, peaking at number 58 on the Billboard Hot 100 and in the top ten positions on the R&B and Dance charts. Despite her success on EMI Records, she parted ways with the record label.

Her sixth album Skindiver on independent label Private Music in 1989. Following the release of seventh album You Have to Cry Sometime, a collaborative effort with Billy Vera, Hendryx went on a hiatus. After nearly twenty years, she released her second collaborative album It's Time with Kahil El'Zabar's Ethnics. The album succeeded by the released of her ninth album Mutatis Mutandis in July 2012.

== Albums ==
=== Studio albums ===
List of albums, with selected chart positions
Title	Album details	Peak chart positions	
Title	Album details	US	US R&B
Nona Hendryx	Released: October 1977; Label: Epic; Format: LP	—	—
Nona	Released: April 1983; Label: RCA; Format: LP	83	25
The Art of Defense	Released: March 1, 1984; Label: RCA; Format: LP, cassette	167	40
The Heat	Released: August 1, 1985; Label: RCA; Format: LP, cassette	—	—
Female Trouble	Released: April 17, 1987; Label: EMI; Format: LP, cassette	96	80
Skindiver	Released: June 28, 1989; Label: Private Music; Format: LP, cassette, CD	—	—
Mutatis Mutandis	Released: July 31, 2012; Label: Righteous Babe; Format: CD	—	—

=== Collaborative albums ===
Title	Album details
You Have to Cry Sometime	Released: 1992; with Billy Vera; Label: Shanachie; Format: Cassette, CD
It's Time	Released: August 31, 2011; with Kahil El'Zabar's Ethnics; Label: Katalyst Entertainment; Format: CD
The World of Captain Beefheart	Released: November 10, 2017; with Gary Lucas; Label: Knitting Factory; Format: CD, digital download

=== Compilation albums ===
- Transformation – The Best of Nona Hendryx 1999, Razor & Tie
- Rough & Tough 2001, EMI

== Extended plays ==
- Keep Funkin 2018, Soul Clap Records

== Singles ==
=== As lead artist ===
List of singles as lead artist
Title	Year	Peak chart positions			Album
Title	Year	US	US R&B	US Dance	Album
"Everybody Wants to be Somebody"	1977	—	—	—	Nona Hendryx
"Winning"	1977	—	—	—	Nona Hendryx
"You're the Only One That I Ever Needed"	1979	—	—	—	Non-album single
"Love It"	1979	—	—	—	Non-album single
"Snakes Alive"	1979	—	—	—	Non-album single
"Love Is Like an Itching in My Heart"	1980	—	—	—	Non-album single
"Keep It Confidential"	1983	91	22	25	Nona Hendryx
"Transformation"	1983	—	40	—	Nona Hendryx
"B-Boys"	1983	—	—	25	Nona Hendryx
"I Sweat (Going Through The Motions)"	1984	—	28	40	The Art of Defense
"To the Bone"	1984	—	—	35	The Art of Defense
"Heart of a Woman"	1984	—	—	—	Hard to Hold
"If Looks Could Kill (D.O.A.)"	1985	—	71	—	The Heat
"I Need Love"	1986	—	68	—	The Heat
"Rock this House"	1986	—	—	—	The Heat
"Why Should I Cry?"	1987	58	5	6	Female Trouble
"Baby Go-Go"	1987	—	60	44	Female Trouble
"Winds of Change (Mandela to Mandela)"	1987	—	—	—	Female Trouble
"Women Who Fly"	1989	—	—	—	Skindiver
"Walk with Me"	2016	—	—	—	Non-album single
"Out Come The Freaks" (featuring Soft Cell)	2026	—	—	—	Non-album single

=== As featured artist ===
List of singles as lead artist
Title	Year	Peak chart positions	Album
Title	Year	US Dance	Album
"Bustin' Out" (Material with Nona Hendryx)	1981	3	Bustin' Out (EP)
"Do What You Wanna Do" (The Cage featuring Nona Hendryx)	1982	—	Non-album single
"Sun City" (with Artists United Against Apartheid)	1985	—	Non-album single
"Shine (This Is It)" (Soul Clap featuring Nona Hendryx)	2016	—	Non-album single
"Shine (This Is It)" (Amanda Shires featuring Nona Hendryx, Angie Stone, Cyndi Lauper, K.Flay, Lilly Hiatt, Linda Perry, Morgane Stapleton, Peaches, and Valerie June)	2021	—	Non-album single
"Legion" (Eivind Ringstad & Jan Bang featuring Nona Hendryx)	2023	—	Non-album single

== See also ==
- Labelle discography
