= Vintage Vinos =

Compilation album by Keith Richards
- Released: 2 November 2010
- Recorded: 1987–2002
- Genre: Rock
- Length: 63:20
- Label: Mindless Records
- Producer: Lawrence Peryer

Keith Richards chronology
Main Offender (1992)	Vintage Vinos (2010)	Crosseyed Heart (2015)

Professional ratings
Review scores
Source	Rating
AllMusic	link
Tom Hull	B−

Vintage Vinos is a compilation album by Keith Richards, released on 2 November 2010. The album features remastered solo and X-Pensive Winos tracks from Talk is Cheap, Live at the Hollywood Palladium, December 15, 1988, Main Offender, and "Hurricane", a special bonus song. Previously available only to fans who donated to Hurricane Katrina relief, the song was recorded during The Rolling Stones sessions for Forty Licks in 2002. Vintage Vinos peaked at No. 40 on the Billboard Top Independent Albums chart. It has sold 21,000 copies in the US as of August 2015.

The release of the disc highlights the release of Richards' book Life.

== Track listing ==
1. "Take It So Hard" – 3:16
2. "Big Enough" – 3:19
3. "You Don't Move Me" – 4:50
4. "Struggle" – 4:12
5. "Make No Mistake" – 4:55
6. "Too Rude" – 7:46
7. "Time Is on My Side" – 4:26
8. "Happy" – 7:08
9. "Connection" – 2:32
10. "Wicked as It Seems" – 4:45
11. "Eileen" – 4:29
12. "Hate It When You Leave" – 4:58
13. "Locked Away" – 5:45
14. "Hurricane" – 1:25

== Personnel ==
Musicians

- Keith Richards – vocals, electric guitar, background vocals (1–4, 10–13), acoustic guitar (3), bass (11), keyboards (12), percussion (2)
- Waddy Wachtel – electric guitar (1, 4, 6–12), slide guitar (3), acoustic guitar (13), background vocals (8–12), piano (11), celeste (12)
- Ron Wood – slide guitar
- Steve Jordan – bass (1), background vocals (1–13), percussion (2, 3), drums (2–13), congas (5, 12), castanet (11), keyboards (12)
- Ivan Neville - Piano (1, 11, 13), keyboards (1, 4, 6–9, 13), background vocals (6–9), clavinet (10), bass (12)
- Bernie Worrell – organ (2, 3, 5), clavinet (5)
- Bootsy Collins – bass (2)
- Michael Doucet – violin (13)
- Charley Drayton – drums (1), bass (3–10, 13), background vocals (6, 11, 12), piano (12), Hammond B-3 organ (12)
- Jack Bashkow – woodwind (12)
- Crispin Cioe – woodwind (12)
- Arno Hacht – woodwind (12)
- Ben Cauley – horns (5)
- Jack Hale – horns (5)
- Jimmi Kinnard – horns (5)
- Andrew Love – horns (5)
- James Mitchell – horns (5)
- Gary Topper – horns (5)
- Willie Mitchell – horn arrangements (5)
- Bobby Keys – saxophone (6)
- Maceo Parker – alto saxophone (2)
- Sarah Dash – vocals (5, 7), background vocals (2)
- Babi Floyd – background vocals (10, 12)
- Bernard Fowler – background vocals (10, 12)
- Stanley Dural – accordion (3, 13)

Production

- Steve Jordan – producer (1–13)
- Keith Richards – producer (1–13)
- Waddy Wachtel – producer (10–12), production consultant (1–5, 13)
- Don Smith – producer (6–9)
- Lawrence Peryer – compilation producer
- Ted Jensen – mastering engineer
