= The Hit Factory =

Recording studio in New York City, U.S.

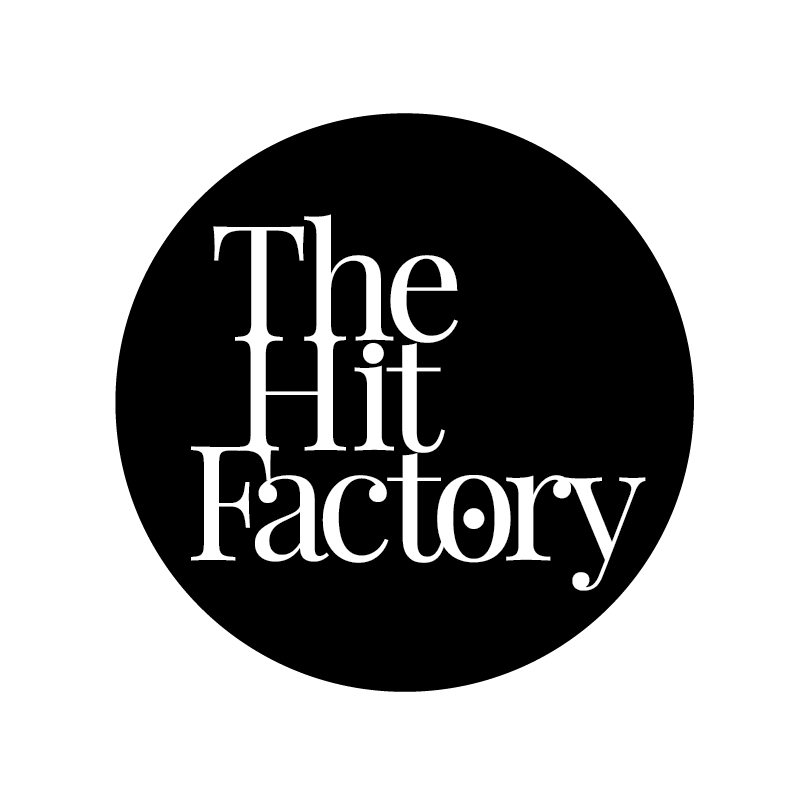
- Type: Recording studio
- Industry: Music
- Founded: 1969
- Headquarters: 676 Broadway, New York City, U.S.
- Owner: Troy Germano
- Website: thehitfactory.com

The Hit Factory is a recording studio in New York City owned and operated by Troy Germano.

== History ==
The Hit Factory was opened in 1969 by the songwriter Jerry Ragavoy. On March 6, 1975, Edward Germano, a singer, record producer, and one of the principal owners of the Record Plant Studios New York, purchased The Hit Factory (located at 353 West 48th Street) from Ragavoy. Germano incorporated The Hit Factory into a business, redesigned its studios, and created the logo it uses to this day. At that time, The Hit Factory consisted of 2 studios; Studio A2 and Studio A6. Eventually, a third was added, Studio A5. Notable albums from this location include Songs in the Key of Life by Stevie Wonder, One-Trick Pony by Paul Simon, Fear of Music by Talking Heads, Voices by Hall & Oates, Bat Out of Hell by Meat Loaf, Foreigner by Foreigner, I'm in You by Peter Frampton, Peter Gabriel ("Scratch") by Peter Gabriel, Emotional Rescue by the Rolling Stones, and Double Fantasy by John Lennon and Yoko Ono.

In 1981, The Hit Factory moved to a new location at 237 West 54th Street, across the street from Studio 54. Dubbed The Hit Factory Broadway, the new location had five studios designed by Germano: A1, A2, A3, M1, and M4—the last of which was later transformed into the first mastering suite for Herb Powers Jr.

Albums that were recorded and/or mixed at this location include Graceland by Paul Simon, Born in the U.S.A. by Bruce Springsteen, Undercover by the Rolling Stones, Under a Blood Red Sky by U2, The Rhythm of the Saints by Paul Simon, Live/1975–85 by Bruce Springsteen & the E-Street Band, True Colors by Cyndi Lauper, Whiplash Smile by Billy Idol, Steel Wheels by the Rolling Stones, Long After Dark by Tom Petty and the Heartbreakers, Agent Provocateur by Foreigner, Tunnel of Love by Bruce Springsteen, Riptide by Robert Palmer, Up Your Alley by Joan Jett & the Blackhearts, Forever by Kool & the Gang, the Bodyguard soundtrack by Whitney Houston, Hell Freezes Over by Eagles, August by Eric Clapton, Talk Is Cheap by Keith Richards and Dangerous by Michael Jackson.

In 1987, Germano opened another location, The Hit Factory Times Square, at 130 West 42nd Street. Previously known as Chelsea Sound, the studios were redesigned by Ed and Troy Germano. This facility had two recording studios, Studio C and Studio B, as well as three mastering rooms under the moniker The Hit Factory DMS, for digital mastering studios. The mastering rooms were for engineers Herb Powers Jr., Chris Gehringer, and Tom Coyne. The Times Square recording and mastering studios existed until 1992. Albums of historical importance recorded or mixed at this location include Freedom by Neil Young, Foreign Affair by Tina Turner, Down with the King by Run-DMC, Don't Sweat the Technique by Eric B. & Rakim, Storm Front by Billy Joel, and Mariah Carey (album) by Mariah Carey.

In 1991, Ed Germano acquired a 100,000-square-foot building at 421 West 54th Street. It opened in 1993 as simply The Hit Factory. Ed and Troy designed and built this facility with David Bell, Derek Buckingham, Alan Cundell of White Mark Limited and Neil Grant of Harris Grant Associates UK. As the main headquarters for The Hit Factory, the studios expanded to seven recording-and-mixing studios (Studios 1–7), five mastering studios (The Hit Factory Mastering) and five private writing-production suites, including rooms for Mark Ronson, Kevin Shirley and Trackmasters. Studio 1 was built for orchestral recordings that could accommodate up to 140 musicians. In 2002, Troy Germano consolidated the New York City operations into this building. Some of the albums recorded or mixed at this facility include HIStory by Michael Jackson, Butterfly by Mariah Carey, Let's Talk About Love by Celine Dion, Dangerously in Love by Beyoncé, CrazySexyCool by TLC, Ray of Light by Madonna, No Strings Attached by NSYNC, Falling into You by Celine Dion, Daydream by Mariah Carey, Life After Death by the Notorious B.I.G., the Titanic soundtrack album, Merry Christmas by Mariah Carey, Duets by Frank Sinatra, My Life by Mary J. Blige, Rhythm of Love by Anita Baker, Songs by Luther Vandross, The Velvet Rope by Janet Jackson, Invincible by Michael Jackson, Pop by U2, Space Jam with Seal, X&Y by Coldplay, Music by Madonna, River of Dreams by Billy Joel and Sogno by Andrea Bocelli.

From 1989 to 1993, the company also operated The Hit Factory London. In 1989, Ed and Troy, in a joint venture with Sony Music UK, took control of CBS Studios on Whitfield Street in Soho, London. They redesigned the facility and reopened at the beginning of 1990 with the Rolling Stones working on their album Flashpoint. Sade recorded her album Love Deluxe in Studio 2 and Alison Moyet recorded her album, "Hoodoo" in Studio 3. The studios were designed by Ed, Troy, and the team from Harris Grant Associates UK (David Bell, Derek Buckingham, Alan Cundell & Neil Grant). This facility had three recording studios: Studio 1, Studio 2, and the Rooftop Studio 3, as well as five mastering rooms and hosted many of the artists from that era from Sony Music's UK labels (primarily Columbia Records & Epic Records). Studio 1 was designed for orchestral recording and could accommodate 100 piece orchestra. The film score for Basic Instinct, by composer Jerry Goldsmith, was recorded here. The Hit Factory London remained through 1993 until the Germano's sold their interests back to Sony Music ending the partnership and retaining The Hit Factory name and trademark. This facility later became Sony's Whitfield Street Studio.

In 1998, Ed and Troy purchased Criteria Recording in Miami, Florida, revamping and reopening the studios under the new name The Hit Factory Criteria Miami. The studios were designed again by Ed, Troy, and White Mark Limited UK (David Bell, Alan Cundell & Derek Buckingham). The facility had five recording studios–Studio A, Studio C, Studio D, Studio E, and Studio F–a completed mastering room used as a writing and production room for guest producers and artists. In 2012, the Germanos sold the studio as Criteria Recording Studios and retained The Hit Factory name, logo and trademark.

Edward Germano died in 2003 and The Hit Factory closed its main headquarters in 2005. Contrary to reports in the media that the studios in New York City were shuttered due to the advancement of home digital recording, the building at 421 West 54th was sold for estate planning purposes.

In 2008, Troy Germano, completed Germano Studios in Manhattan's Noho neighborhood. Germano Studios changed its name to The Hit Factory in 2023, and is now the only The Hit Factory or Hit Factory recording studio in the world. Notable albums recorded here include "Hackney Diamonds" by The Rolling Stones, "Jose" by J Balvin, "Crosseyed Heart" by Keith Richards, "Manana Sera Bonito" by Karol G, "Astroworld" by Travis Scott, "Hollywood's Bleeding" by Post Malone, "Damn" by Kendrick Lamar, "Born This Way" by Lady Gaga, "21" by Adele, "Blonde" by Frank Ocean, "Uptown Special" by Mark Ronson, "Love in the Future" by John Legend, "Éxodo" by Peso Pluma, "Luv Is Rage 2" by Lil Uzi Vert, "Unvarnished" by Joan Jett and the Blackhearts, "My World 2.0" by Justin Bieber, "4" by Beyoncé, "2014 Forest Hills Drive" by J.Cole, "Clapton" by Eric Clapton, "Scarlet" by Doja Cat, "Beauty Behind The Madness" by The Weeknd, and "Music" by Playboi Carti.

== Locations ==
The studios occupied several spaces in and around Midtown West, Times Square and Noho. Locations:

- 7th Avenue (The Hit Factory) 1969-1972
- 353 West 48th Street, (The Hit Factory, West 48th Street) 1972–1981
- 237 West 54th Street (The Hit Factory Broadway), 1981–2002
- 130 West 42nd Street (The Hit Factory Times Square), 1987–1992
- 31–37 Whitfield Street (The Hit Factory London), 1989–1993
- 1755 NE 149th Street (The Hit Factory Miami), 1998–2012
- 421 West 54th Street (The Hit Factory Headquarters), 1992–2005
- 676 Broadway (The Hit Factory, Noho), 2008–present

== RIAA Diamond Awards ==
27 RIAA Diamond Awards albums and songs have been recorded at The Hit Factory:

- Stevie Wonder "Songs In The Key Of Life"
- Bruce Springsteen "Born In The USA"
- Whitney Houston "Whitney"
- Celine Dion "Falling Into You"
- TLC "CrazySexyCool"
- Santana "Supernatural"
- Bruce Springsteen & The E Street Band "Live 1975–'85"
- Whitney Houston "The Bodyguard"
- Billy Joel "Greatest Hits Volume I & Volume II"
- "Titanic" soundtrack
- Meat Loaf "Bat Out Of Hell"
- NSYNC "No Strings Attached"
- Celine Dion "Lets Talk About Love"
- Michael Jackson "Bad"
- Mariah Carey "Daydream"
- Lauryn Hill "The Miseducation of Lauryn Hill"
- Adele "21"
- Travis Scott "Sicko Mode"
- Justin Bieber "Baby"
- John Legend "All Of Me"
- Maroon 5 "Moves Like Jagger"
- Mariah Carey "All I Want For Christmas Is You"
- Whitney Houston "I Will Always Love You"
- The Notorious B.I.G. "Life After Death"
- Kenny G "Breathless"
- Beyonce "Halo"
- Mariah Carey "Merry Christmas"

== Album of the Year Grammy Awards ==
The Hit Factory has 10 wins and 33 nominations for Album of the Year:

- 1977 "Songs in the Key of Life" Stevie Wonder
- 1980 "Double Fantasy" John Lennon and Yoko Ono
- 1987 "Graceland" Paul Simon
- 1992 "Unforgettable... With Love" Natalie Cole
- 1994 "The Bodyguard" Whitney Houston
- 1997 "Falling Into You" Celine Dion
- 1999 "The Miseducation Of Lauryn Hill" Lauryn Hill
- 2000 "Supernatural" Santana
- 2012 "21" Adele
- 2023 "Mañana Será Bonito" Karol G (Latin Grammy Award)

== Academy Award for Best Original Song ==
The Hit Factory has three wins and seven nominations for Best Original Song

- 1988 Working Girl "Let the River Run" by Carly Simon
- 1995 Pocahontas "Colors of the Wind" by Alan Menken and Stephen Schwartz
- 1997 Titanic "My Heart Will Go On" by James Horner and Will Jennings (Celine Dion)

== John Lennon's last recording session ==
Public awareness of The Hit Factory increased after the death of John Lennon on December 8, 1980. Lennon had recorded his final album at The Hit Factory at 353 West 48th Street, a fact mentioned in some newspaper accounts of the murder. There are contradictory reports as to whether he was recording and mixing at The Hit Factory or the nearby Record Plant on the day he was murdered. Most publications give the Record Plant as the location, as do producer Jack Douglas and others who were with Lennon that day. However, Keith Badman, not an eyewitness, writes in his book The Beatles: After the Break-up, 1970–2000 that Lennon had been at The Hit Factory the night of his murder. He also writes that Lennon had been at the studio the previous few days working on and mixing tracks for Yoko Ono.

The obituary of British DJ Andy Peebles to whom John Lennon gave his last interview mentions that Lennon postponed the interview at 'The Hit Factory' until 6pm on Saturday 6th December as he and Yoko had been up all Friday night mixing her new single 'Walking on Thin Ice' suggesting they were at the 353 East 48th Street location. The obituary also shows a picture of Andy Peebles and BBC crew outside that 353 location. It was at the studio, that John Lennon gave his last ever interview. British DJ Andy Peebles had spoken with the former Beatle just two days before his murder outside his Upper West Side apartment building.

== Notable recordings ==
=== Albums ===
- Hackney Diamonds by The Rolling Stones 2023
- Graceland by Paul Simon 1986
- Songs in the Key of Life by Stevie Wonder 1976
- Double Fantasy by John Lennon and Yoko Ono 1980
- Emotional Rescue by The Rolling Stones 1980
- Born in the U.S.A. by Bruce Springsteen 1984
- Mary by Mary J. Blige 1999
- Fear of Music by Talking Heads 1979
- It Was Written by Nas 1996
- Dangerously In Love by Beyoncé 2003
- Milk and Honey by John Lennon and Yoko Ono 1984
- This Is Me... Then by Jennifer Lopez 2002
- Flashpoint by The Rolling Stones 1991
- Scarface by Giorgio Moroder 1983
- Hell Freezes Over by Eagles in 1994
- River of Dreams by Billy Joel 1993
- Ready to Die by The Notorious B.I.G. 1994
- Pop by U2 1997
- Octavarium by Dream Theater 2005
- Under a Blood Red Sky by U2 1983
- Chimes of Freedom by Bruce Springsteen 1988
- Daydream by Mariah Carey 1995
- Vol. 2... Hard Knock Life by Jay-Z 1998
- Falling Into You by Celine Dion 1996
- The Bodyguard by Whitney Houston 1992
- Titanic: Music from the Motion Picture 1997
- We Live Here by Pat Metheny Group 1995
- Space Jam 1996
- No Strings Attached by NSYNC 2000
- Nellyville by Nelly 2002
- Duets by Frank Sinatra 1993
- Bat Out Of Hell by Meat Loaf 1977
- Foreigner by Foreigner 1977
- Hands All Over (album) by Maroon 5 2010
- Unforgettable... with Love by Natalie Cole 1991
- True Colors by Cyndi Lauper 1986
- HIStory: Past, Present and Future, Book I by Michael Jackson 1995
- Dangerous by Michael Jackson 1991
- CrazySexyCool by TLC 1994
- Celebrity by NSYNC 2001
- What's the 411? by Mary J. Blige 1992
- Merry Christmas by Mariah Carey 1994
- Riptide by Robert Palmer 1985
- Big Willie Style by Will Smith 1997
- Swept Away by Diana Ross 1984
- Forever by Kool & the Gang 1986
- Machismo by Cameo 1988
- Live at the Hollywood Palladium, December 15, 1988 by Keith Richards 1988
- Green by R.E.M. 1988
- Rhythm of Love by Anita Baker 1994
- Down with the King by Run-DMC 1993
- Live and Sleazy by Village People 1979
- Britney by Britney Spears 2001
- Main Offender by Keith Richards 1993
- I Am... by Nas 1999
- Valotte by Julian Lennon 1984
- Greatest Hits by Lenny Kravitz 2000
- Dream of Life by Patti Smith 1988
- Boys and Girls by Bryan Ferry 1985
- More Than You Think You Are by Matchbox Twenty 2002
- Up by R.E.M. 1998
- The Velvet Rope by Janet Jackson 1997
- X&Y by Coldplay 2005
- Songs by Luther Vandross 1994
- Time, Love & Tenderness by Michael Bolton 1991
- A Very Special Christmas by Various Artists 1987
- Back to the Future Soundtrack 1986
- Supernatural by Santana 1999
- Night Music by Joe Jackson 1994
- Men Without Women by Little Steven and the Disciples of Soul 1982
- Rocky IV Soundtrack 1985
- Sacred Love by Sting 2003
- Mariah Carey by Mariah Carey 1990
- Foreign Affair by Tina Turner 1989
- The 30th Anniversary Concert Celebration by Bob Dylan 1993
- Tunnel of Love by Bruce Springsteen 1987
- Whitney by Whitney Houston 1987
- Black Tie White Noise by David Bowie 1993
- Bedtime Stories by Madonna 1994
- Survivor by Destiny's Child 2001
- Back to Broadway by Barbra Streisand 1993
- Sogno by Andrea Bocelli 1999
- Love Deluxe by Sade 1992
- You Can Dance by Madonna 1987
- Hollywood's Bleeding by Post Malone 2019
- Astroworld by Travis Scott 2018
- Damn by Kendrick Lamar 2017
- Living In A Ghost Town by The Rolling Stones 2020
- Stoney by Post Malone 2016
- The Life of Pablo by Kanye West 2016
- Crosseyed Heart by Keith Richards 2015
- Brightest Blue by Ellie Goulding 2020
- Born This Way by Lady Gaga 2011
- 21 by Adele 2012
- 4 by Beyoncé 2011
- My World 2.0 by Justin Bieber 2010
- Beauty Behind The Madness by The Weeknd 2015
- Clapton by Eric Clapton 2010
- Blonde by Frank Ocean 2016
- Queen by Nicki Minaj 2018
- Battle Born by the Killers 2012
- Bridges by Josh Groban 2018
- Uptown Special by Mark Ronson2015
- Yeezus by Kanye West 2013
- Prism by Katy Perry 2013
- Threads by Sheryl Crow 2019
- Play On by Carrie Underwood 2009
- Luv Is Rage 2 by Lil Uzi Vert 2017
- A Town Called Paradise by Tiesto 2014
- Cloud Nine by Kygo 2016
- At.Long.Last.A$AP by A$AP Rocky 2015
- Harmony by Josh Groban 2020
- The Blessed Unrest by Sara Bareilles 2013
- async by Ryuichi Sakamoto 2017
- Memoirs of an Imperfect Angel by Mariah Carey 2009
- Stronger With Each Tear by Mary J. Blige 2009
- Life Is Good by Nas 2012
- Vibras by J Balvin 2018
- Rêvolution by IAM 2017
- Title by Meghan Trainor 2015
- The Element of Freedom by Alicia Keys 2009
- Native by OneRepublic 2013
- Rebirth by Lil Wayne 2010
- Rated R by Rihanna 2009
- Love in the Future by John Legend 2014
- Girl by Pharrell Williams 2014
- This House Is Not for Sale by Bon Jovi 2016
- Unvarnished by Joan Jett and the Blackhearts 2013
- Divinely Uninspired To A Hellish Extent by Lewis Capaldi 2019
- 2020 by Bon Jovi 2020
- Invasion of Privacy by Cardi B 2018
- Stranger Songs by Ingrid Michaelson 2019
- Tha Carter V by Lil Wayne 2018
- My Beautiful Dark Twisted Fantasy by Kanye West 2010
- Seal the Deal & Let's Boogie by Volbeat 2016
- Anti by Rihanna 2016
- Before I Self Destruct by 50 Cent 2009
- MDNA by Madonna 2012
- Merry Christmas II You by Mariah Carey 2010
- I Am... Sasha Fierce by Beyoncé 2009
- Oasis by J. Balvin and Bad Bunny 2019
- The Beginning by The Black Eyed Peas 2010
- No Mercy by T.I. 2010
- I Decided by Big Sean 2017
- Christmas by Michael Buble 2011
- Cradlesong by Rob Thomas 2009
- Mind of Mine by Zayn 2016
- The Blues Is Alive and Well by Buddy Guy 2018
- Swing Symphony by Wynton Marsalis 2019
- Soulbook by Rod Stewart 2009
- Light by Matisyahu 2009
- Everybody by Logic 2017
- Malice N Wonderland by Snoop Dogg 2009
- Suga by Megan Thee Stallion 2020
- I Look To You by Whitney Houston 2009
- Sweetener by Ariana Grande 2018
- Dark Lane Demo Tapes by Drake 2020
- The Revenant Soundtrack 2016
- Beauty and the Beast Soundtrack 2017
- Mary Poppins Returns Soundtrack 2018
- Despicable Me: Original Motion Picture Soundtrack Soundtrack 2010
- Over The Moon Soundtrack 2020
- Hello Dolly! (Bette Midler) Broadway Cast Recording 2017
- Creed Soundtrack 2015
- Minamata Soundtrack 2020
- Black Mirror Smithereens Soundtrack by Ryuichi Sakamoto 2019
- Bad Reputation Soundtrack 2018
- Talk Is Cheap by Keith Richards 1988
- Steel Wheels by The Rolling Stones 1989
- Undercover by The Rolling Stones 1983
- Live/1975-85 by Bruce Springsteen & The E Street Band 1986
- Nine Lives by Aerosmith 1997
- August by Eric Clapton 1986
- Kamakiriad by Donald Fagen 1993
- On The 6 by Jennifer Lopez 1999
- Storm Front by Billy Joel 1989
- Music by Madonna 2000
- Whiplash Smile by Billy Idol 1986
- Freedom by Neil Young 1989
- Rhythm of the Saints by Paul Simon 1990
- Let's Talk About Love by Celine Dion 1997
- Invincible by Michael Jackson 2001
- Romances by Luis Miguel 1997
- Never Let Me Go by Luther Vandross 1993
- Butterfly by Mariah Carey 1997
- Babylon and On by Squeeze 1987
- You're the One by Paul Simon 2000
- Goddess in the Doorway by Mick Jagger 2001
- Brian Wilson by Brian Wilson 1988
- Animalize by Kiss 1984
- Long After Dark by Tom Petty and the Heartbreakers 1982
- Voices by Hall & Oates 1980
- Lick It Up by Kiss 1983
- 7800° Fahrenheit by Bon Jovi 1985
- State of Confusion by the Kinks 1983
- Across the Borderline by Willie Nelson 1993
- Your Filthy Little Mouth by David Lee Roth 1994
- Come Out and Play by Twisted Sister 1985
- Up Your Alley by Joan Jett and The Blackhearts 1988
- Steppin' Out by Tony Bennett 1994
- Forty Licks by The Rolling Stones 2002
- Ray of Light by Madonna 1998
- Paul Simon's Concert in the Park by Paul Simon 1991
- John Lennon Anthology by John Lennon 1998
- Taste of Chocolate by Big Daddy Kane 1990
- Bad by Michael Jackson 1987
- Greatest Hits by Bruce Springsteen 1995
- Greatest Hits – Volume I & Volume II by Billy Joel
- Heavy Nova by Robert Palmer 1987
- My Life by Mary J. Blige 1994
- My Love Is Your Love by Whitney Houston 1998
- The Rolling Stones Rock and Roll Circus by The Rolling Stones 1996
- Share My World by Mary J. Blige 1997
- Still Waters by Bee Gees 1997
- Temple of Low Men by Crowded House 1998
- Blood on the Dance Floor: HIStory in the Mix by Michael Jackson 1997
- A Night to Remember by Cyndi Lauper 1989
- Ooh Yeah! by Hall & Oates 1988
- I'm in You by Peter Frampton 1976
- Big Science by Laurie Anderson 1982
- Sons of Soul by Tony! Toni! Tone! 1993
- I Am... by Nas 1999
- Groove Approved by Paul Carrack 1989
- The Hunter by Blondie 1982
- Special by Jimmy Cliff 1982
- True Blue by Madonna 1986
- Shaka Zulu by Ladysmith Black Mambazo 1987
- Power of Love by Luther Vandross 1991
- Mr. Happy Go Lucky by John Mellencamp 1996
- Soul Searchin' by Glenn Frey 1988
- 18 Tracks by Bruce Springsteen 1999
- Uh-Oh by David Byrne 1992
- Station to Station by David Bowie 1976
- Agent Provocateur by Foreigner 1984
- It's a Game by Bay City Rollers 1977
- Stripped by Christina Aguilera 2002
- Music (Playboi Carti album) by Playboi Carti 2025
