= AUAA =

AUAA refers to

- Artists United Against Apartheid
- The Atlantic Universities Athletics Association, which became Atlantic University Sport in 1999
