= Locked Away (disambiguation) =

"Locked Away" is a 2015 song by Rock City featuring Adam Levine.

Locked Away may also refer to:

- Locked Away, a 2010 television film starring Jean Louisa Kelly
- "Locked Away", an episode of Doctors
- "Locked Away", a song by Keith Richards from Talk Is Cheap

== See also ==
- Imprisonment
