= Trouble (Keith Richards song) =

Single by Keith Richards

from the album Crosseyed Heart
- Released: 17 July 2015
- Genre: Rock and roll
- Length: 4:18
- Label: Mindless
- Songwriters: Keith Richards, Steve Jordan
- Producers: Keith Richards, Steve Jordan

Keith Richards singles chronology
"Eileen" (1993)	"Trouble" (2015)	"Heartstopper" (2015)

"Trouble" is a song by English musician and guitarist of the rock band The Rolling Stones, Keith Richards. The song was written and produced by Richards and American musician Steve Jordan for Richards' third studio album, Crosseyed Heart (2015). It is a revision of an unreleased demo called Just Because from Rolling Stones recording sessions at Studio Guillaume Tell, Suresnes, France, May 13-June 7 2002. "Trouble" was released by Mindless, Richards' own record label as a digital single on 17 July 2015 through iHeartRadio. "Trouble" became the first major single released by Richards since "Eileen", launched in 1993 from the album Main Offender (1992). It reached #20 on Billboard's Adult Alternative Songs and #64 on UK's Top 100 Airplay Chart.

== Background and composition ==
I had a ball making this new record and working with Steve Jordan and Waddy Wachtel again. There's nothing like walking into a studio and having absolutely no idea what you’re going to come out with on the other end. If you’re looking for 'Trouble', you've come to the right place.

— Richards in a press release.

Keith Richards, member of the English rock band The Rolling Stones, released his third solo studio album Crosseyed Heart on 18 September 2015, through Mindless Records, his first since Main Offender, released in 1992. Crosseyed Heart counts with the collaboration of American musician Steve Jordan as Richards' co-writer and co-producer. The X-Pensive Winos, Richards' supporting band, provided other instruments to the song: Jordan on drums, Waddy Wachtel on the guitar, and Bernard Fowler as Richards' background vocals.

To promote Crosseyed Heart, the song "Trouble" premiered on 17 July 2015 on BBC Radio 2, and later was released through iHeartRadio, as the lead digital single. Upon its release, music critics noted it was a rock and roll song, that includes elements of blues. According to Jon Blistein from Rolling Stone, the "Trouble" lyrics "[seem] to be channeling [Richards'] inner Lou Reed". Marc Seliger said the lyrics "[appear] to be about a female friend who has landed behind bars."

== Critical reception ==
Rachel Brodsky from Spin said, "['Trouble'] sounds as solid and agreeable as it gets: edgy enough to make youngins do a brief double-take and classic rock enough to add it to your dad’s repertoire." Nick DeRiso wrote that Richards "moves with a loose-elbowed sense of fun" in the song and it "doesn't betray [his] ruined darkness". DeRiso concluded that Richards possibly is "at his very best when he's not." Jeff Giles described it as a "stripped-down, uptempo rocker that sounds like it could have been recorded yesterday or 30 years ago". Giles considered "Trouble" has "no unnecessary parts" and that "fans" will hum the refrain and its bridge. Marc Seliger called it a "ragged-yet-melodic song".

== Personnel ==
- Keith Richards – Vocals, electric guitar, acoustic guitar, bass
- Steve Jordan – Drums
- Waddy Wachtel – Guitar
- Bernard Fowler – Backup vocals

== Charts ==
Chart performance for "Trouble"
Chart (2015)	Peak position
Mexico Ingles Airplay (Billboard)	49
US Adult Alternative Songs (Billboard)	20
