= If My Ancestors Could See Me Now =

Studio album by Ivan Neville
- Released: 1988
- Studios: A&M, Hollywood, California
- Genres: Rhythm and blues, funk, soul, rock
- Label: Polydor
- Producer: Danny Kortchmar

Ivan Neville chronology
If My Ancestors Could See Me Now (1988)	Thanks (1994)

If My Ancestors Could See Me Now is the first solo album by Ivan Neville.

The album had a top 30 hit on the Billboard Hot 100 with the first single, "Not Just Another Girl", when the song reached number 26 on the chart. The second single, "Falling Out of Love", a duet with Bonnie Raitt, reached number 91 on the Hot 100.

== Critical reception ==
Professional ratings
Review scores
Source	Rating
AllMusic	4/5 stars

USA Today noted that "every song is accessible pop, but each one contains an off-kilter thread: Either the drumbeat rolls with a quirky twist, there's an unusual keyboard progression or the guitar solo is just original enough to make you wonder."

== Track listing ==
All tracks composed by Ivan Neville; except where indicated

1. "Sun" - 4:29
2. "Primitive Man" - 3:47
3. "Not Just Another Girl" - 4:10
4. "Falling Out of Love" - 3:44
5. "Out in the Streets" (David Weber) - 4:28
6. "Money Talks" (Steven Stewart) - 4:42
7. "Never Should Have Told Me" - 3:28
8. "Up to You" - 3:40
9. "Another Day's Gone By" (Kevin Walsh, Vance DeGeneres) - 3:36
10. "After All This Time" (Leo Nocentelli) - 4:38

== Personnel ==
- Ivan Neville - keyboards, vocals, guitar on "Up to You", drum programming on "Falling Out of Love", bass on "Not Just Another Girl" and "Money Talks", piano on "Out in the Streets"
- Danny Kortchmar - guitar, additional keyboards and bass on "Primitive Man", saxophone on "Not Just Another Girl", drum programming on "Falling Out of Love"
- Waddy Wachtel - guitar
- Randy Jackson - bass
- Jeff Porcaro - drums, Latin percussion on "Primitive Man"
- Steve Jordan - drums on "Primitive Man" and "Money Talks"
- Jim Keltner - percussion on "Primitive Man" and "Falling Out of Love"
- Bonnie Raitt - vocals on "Falling Out of Love"
- John David Souther - vocals on "Another Day's Gone By"
- Aaron Neville - vocals on "After All This Time"
- Jason Neville - vocals on "Sun"
- James "Hutch" Hutchinson - bass on "After All This Time"

Technical

- Marc DeSisto, Shelly Yakus - recording, mixing
- Larry Vigon - painting
- Eugene Pinkowski - photography

== Charts ==
Chart (1989)	Peak position
US Billboard 200	107
