= Life (Richards book) =

Memoir by Keith Richards

- Cover of the first UK edition of Life
- Author: Keith Richards, James Fox
- Genre: Memoir
- Publisher: Weidenfeld & Nicolson (UK); Little, Brown and Company (US)
- Publication date: 26 October 2010
- Media type: book, audio CD, e-book
- Pages: 564
- ISBN: 978-0-297-85439-5

Life is a memoir by the Rolling Stones' guitarist Keith Richards, written with the assistance of journalist James Fox. Published in October 2010, in hardback, audio and e-book formats, the book chronicles Richards' love of music, charting influences from his mother and maternal grandfather, through his discovery of blues music, the founding of the Rolling Stones, his often turbulent relationship with Mick Jagger, his involvement with drugs, and his relationships with women including Anita Pallenberg and his wife Patti Hansen. Richards also released Vintage Vinos, a compilation of his work with the X-Pensive Winos, at the same time.

Co-writer James Fox interviewed Richards and his associates over a period of five years to produce the book. Life was generally well received by critics and topped The New York Times non-fiction list in the first week of release.

== Synopsis ==
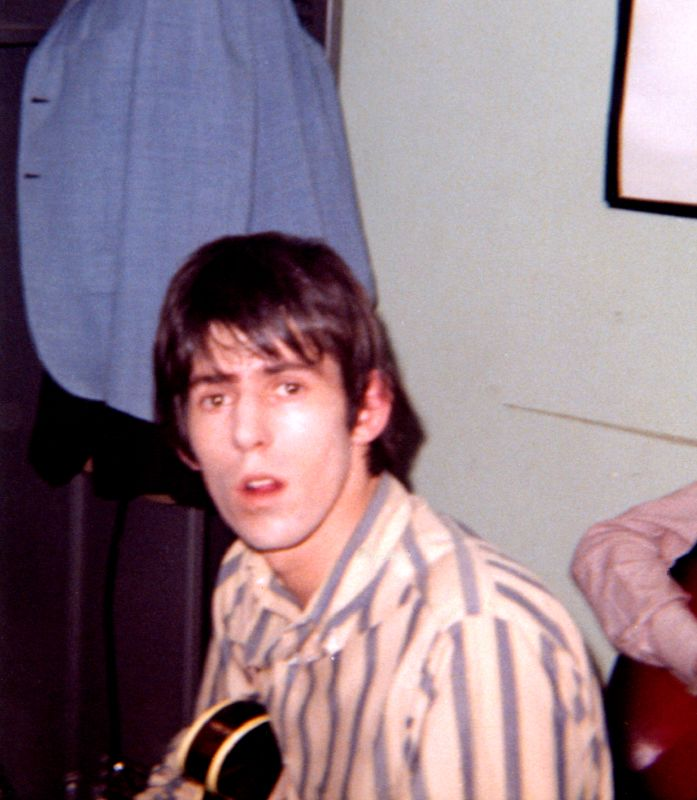
Richards's memoir includes the founding of The Rolling Stones in 1962; he is pictured here in 1965 before a Stones show

Life is a memoir covering Keith Richards's life, starting with his childhood in Dartford, Kent, through to his success with the Rolling Stones and his current life in Connecticut. His interest in music was triggered by his mother, Doris, who played records by Sarah Vaughan, Billy Eckstine and Louis Armstrong, and his maternal grandfather, Augustus Theodore Dupree, a former big band player, who encouraged him to take up the guitar. In his teens he met up with Mick Jagger, who he had known in primary school, and discovered that they both shared a love of blues music. In the early 1960s Richards moved into a London flat, shared with Jagger and Brian Jones. Together with Bill Wyman, Ian Stewart and Charlie Watts, the Rolling Stones were founded in 1962, playing gigs at Ealing Jazz Club and the Crawdaddy Club.

The book chronicles Richards's career with the Stones since 1962, following their rise from playing small club gigs to stadium concerts, Richards's drug habits, his arrests and convictions. His relationships with a number of women, including Anita Pallenberg, Marianne Faithfull, Ronnie Spector and Patti Hansen, whom he married in 1983, are covered in detail. The often difficult partnership between Richards and Jagger is referred to throughout the work and coverage of this has caused much media interest.

Throughout the work, much attention is given to Richards' love of music, his style of playing and chord construction. His non-Stones projects, such as the X-Pensive Winos and recording with the Wingless Angels in Jamaica, as well as collaborations with Chuck Berry and Gram Parsons amongst others are covered in some detail.

== Production ==
James Fox, journalist and author of the non-fiction book White Mischief: The Murder of Lord Erroll, was credited, along with Keith Richards, as co-author. He had previously interviewed Richards in 1973 and the pair had been friends since then. Reportedly, $7.3 million was paid for the work in 2007, "on the basis of a 10-page excerpt". Fox spent "hundreds of hours" with Richards at his Caribbean home, and also in the United Kingdom, to gather material for the book. Cover Photographed by David LaChapelle. He interviewed Richards at length and also talked to many associates. Fox said of Richards, "I'd have to catch him like a salmon." The interviews were conducted seated at a table, but the two were not opposite each other. Richards always played music, so Fox provided him with a lapel microphone. The subject matter was not handled chronologically; Fox allowed his subject to mentally "dart about". "Some sessions lasted hours and some, dealing with the more painful parts of Richards' life, lasted just minutes." The project took five years to complete.

"Once the manuscript was complete, he [Fox] sat opposite Richards and read the entire book aloud to him ... He turned out to be a really natural editor. He cut according to the sound of it." Rebecca Dana of The Daily Beast said of Life that it "covers all the bases: sex, drugs, guitar riffs, the size of Mick Jagger’s endowment. It also digs down into softer spots, including Richards’ tumultuous relationship with Anita Pallenberg and the death of their son. The book, which already seems to have earned a place in the admittedly small canon of genuinely great rock lit, is dishy but not lurid, technical but not wonky. Richards’ voice, filtered through Fox’s brain, is so relentlessly endearing, no less a critic than Maureen Dowd has declared the prince of darkness a "consummate gentleman." Time's Richard Corliss writes "Confessional autobiographies, unless they're by William Boroughs [sic], tend to have inspirational endings: salvation through strong will or a good woman. Life has both."

== Publication ==
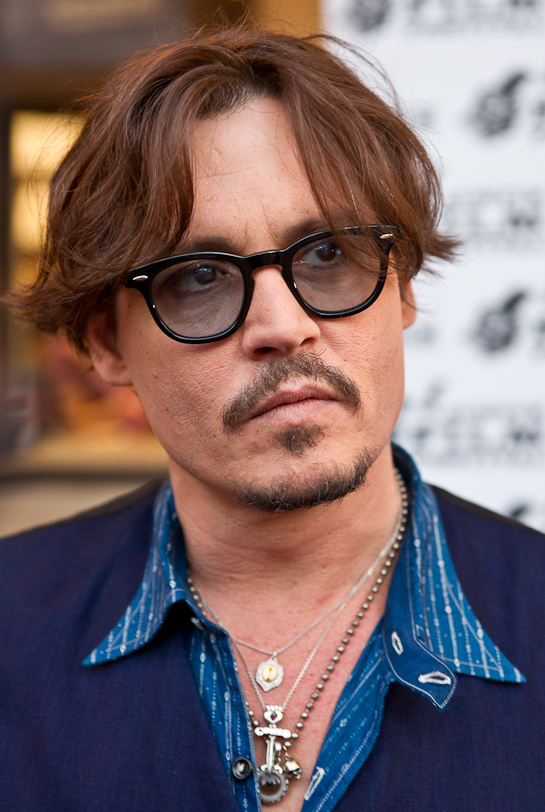
American actor Johnny Depp helped read the audiobook edition of Life

Life was published by Weidenfeld & Nicolson in the United Kingdom and by Little, Brown and Company in the United States on 26 October 2010. It debuted, and spent two weeks, at the top position on The New York Times hard-back non-fiction best-sellers' list. It spent six weeks on the USA Today's best sellers' list, peaking at the third position.

A 22.5-hour audio book version, read by Richards, Johnny Depp and musician Joe Hurley, was also published. The book is available as a digital download and has also been published in e-book format. A paperback version was published in May 2011.

Coinciding with the publication of Life, Richards released Vintage Vinos, a compilation album featuring tracks from three albums by his band, the X-Pensive Winos, as well as some previously unreleased material. The BBC television arts programme The Culture Show broadcast a special on 28 October 2010, consisting of a 60-minute interview with Keith Richards, conducted by Andrew Graham-Dixon. The programme covered "his childhood in Dartford, his passion for music and the decade that catapulted the Rolling Stones from back-room blues boys to one of the greatest rock 'n' roll bands in the world". It included contributions from co-writer James Fox, Dick Taylor, former Stones PA Georgia Bergman and Bobby Keys and covered the same territory as the book. The programme was repeated on 12 November 2010.

== Reception ==
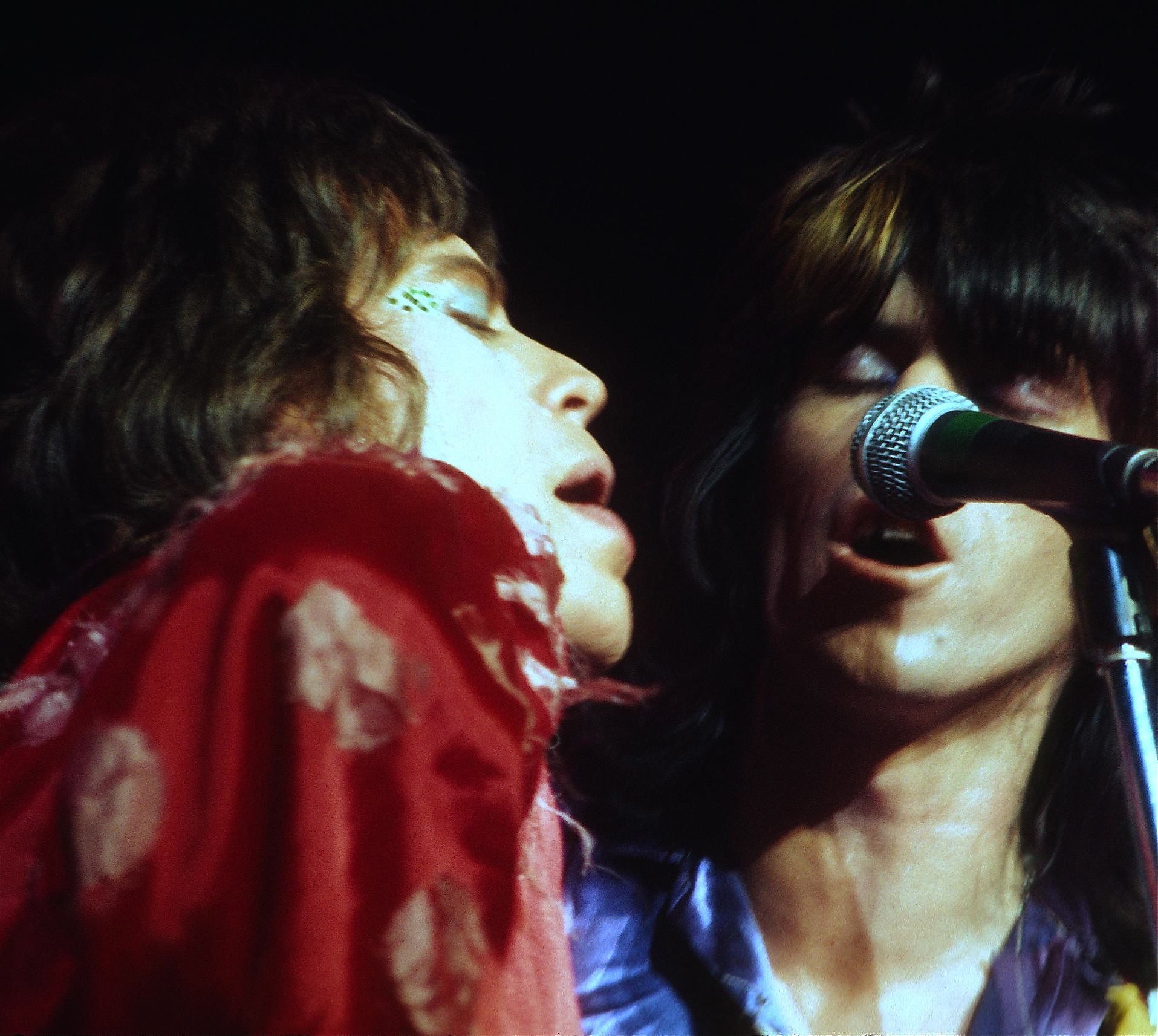
Richards's (right) relationship with Mick Jagger (left) has been a source of highly acclaimed music as well as deep personal conflict for decades

The book was generally well received by critics, with several commenting on the honesty of the work. Charles Spencer of The Daily Telegraph wrote, "Life offers much more than vicarious thrills. It captures the true spirit of rock and roll, the nitty-gritty of life on the road, and just what it feels like to be a heroin addict who doesn't know where his next fix is coming from. It also movingly captures Richards' extraordinary love of music—an even more powerful addiction for him than smack—and perhaps more surprisingly, his manifest destiny as a human being." Jim Fusilli of the Wall Street Journal said that "Mr. Richards writes with disarming introspection about his childhood, family and fame. And it's quite likely that no rock musician has ever written so keenly about the joys of making music. With a warm sense of humor and willingness to share his grief, Mr. Richards in "Life" defies almost every public perception about him." In The Independent, John Walsh commented, "He tells it with complete, reckless, disclosure. Sometimes it sounds like a man ranting into a tape machine; sometimes, in the tidier and more reflective sections, you can detect the hand of his co-writer, James (White Mischief) Fox. But the watchwords of this book are honesty, confessionalism, telling it straight."

The New Yorker said of Life, "Half book, half brand extension, it's an entertaining, rambling monologue, a slurry romp through the life of a man who knew every pleasure, denied himself nothing, and never paid the price." The New York Times said, "Mr. Richards, now 66, writes with uncommon candor and immediacy. He's decided that he's going to tell it as he remembers it, and helped along with notebooks, letters and a diary he once kept, he remembers almost everything."

The popular press focused on the relationship between Jagger and Richards. Tom Bryant in The Daily Mirror wrote, "Keith says his songwriting partner 'started to become unbearable' in the early 80s, adding: 'I think Mick thinks I belong to him but I haven't been to his dressing room in 20 years.'"

== Awards ==
The audiobook Life won two prestigious Audie Awards for 2010—Audiobook of the Year and Best Biography/Memoir. Additionally, the audiobook Life was voted Amazon's No. 1 Audiobook of the Year for 2010. Life received the 2011 Norman Mailer Prize for biography.

== Sources ==
- Richards, Keith; Fox, James (2010). Life. London: Weidenfeld & Nicolson. ISBN 978-0-297-85439-5.
