= Not Just Another Girl =

Single by Ivan Neville
- Released: 1988
- Genre: Rhythm and blues, rock
- Label: Polydor
- Songwriter(s): Ivan Neville
- Producer(s): Danny Kortchmar

Ivan Neville singles chronology
"Not Just Another Girl" (1988)	"Falling Out of Love" (1988)

"Not Just Another Girl" is the first single from Ivan Neville's debut solo album If My Ancestors Could See Me Now, the song reached number 26 on the Billboard Hot 100 chart. The song was featured on the soundtrack to the film My Stepmother Is an Alien.
