= Michael Allison =

American musician (1958–2020)

Michael Allison (August 7, 1958 – January 9, 2020), who recorded under the name Darshan Ambient, was an American musician and vocalist known for his ambient electronic music.

== Life and career ==
Allison attended high school in Modesto, California, and in his mid-teens became lead singer of a rock band, Brimstone. He then joined another band, Skyway, as bass player, and toured widely with them in the Pacific Northwest and the South. When he was 18, he met musician Naux (Juan Maciel), who introduced him to the teachings of Paramahansa Yogananda. Allison later said that: "From that time on, musically, everything I wrote was geared towards a form of Self-Realization. It became cathartic for me to make music that actually produced something positive in people." With Naux, Allison played in New York City, in bands such as Nona Hendryx's Zero Cool, Richard Hell and the Voidoids, and China Shop. In 1984, he formed his own band, Empty House, who played at CBGB's, TRAX, and the Pyramid Club, where they became the regular house band.

Allison left New York in 1987 and moved to San Francisco, where – influenced by musicians such as Brian Eno and Bill Nelson – he began to make ambient electronic music independently of major record labels. Using the name Darshan, from a Sanskrit word meaning "divine vision", and later adding the word "Ambient" to distinguish his music from that of an existing band called Darshan, he started to record and release his own music in 1992. His albums included Providence (2002), The Zen Master’s Diary (2002), Autumn’s Apple (2004), From Pale Hands To Weary Skies (2008), A Day Within Days (2010), and Dream In Blue (2011). His music was used in several films, documentaries, and commercials. He joined the Lotuspike label in 2004, and Spotted Peccary Music in 2008, releasing a total of 14 albums with the labels over that period. A compilation of his work, Re: Karma, was released in 2005. His 2008 album From Pale Hands To Weary Skies won Best Ambient Album at the 2008 NAR Lifestyle Music Awards. His final album, A Day Like Any Other, was released in January 2020.

Allison died in 2020, aged 61, from cancer. His family hosted his celebration of life service on February 1, 2020 at Soul Harvest Worship Center in Modesto, California.
