= The Heat (Nona Hendryx album) =

Studio album by Nona Hendryx
- Released: 1985
- Genre: R&B, funk
- Label: RCA
- Producer: Bernard Edwards, Arthur Baker

Nona Hendryx chronology
The Art of Defense (1984)	The Heat (1985)	Female Trouble (1987)

The Heat is the fourth album by the American musician Nona Hendryx, released in 1985. "If Looks Could Kill (D.O.A.)" was released as a single. Hendryx supported the album with a European tour. "Rock This House", on which Keith Richards played guitar, was nominated for a Grammy Award for "Best Female Rock Vocal Performance".

== Production ==
The album was produced primarily by Bernard Edwards, Arthur Baker, and Jason Corsaro; Hendryx helped to produce "Time" and "Rock This House". Face to Face backed Hendryx on "The Heat Pt. II". Michael Gregory played guitar on many of the tracks. "Rock This House" is about the fight against apartheid in South Africa; Hendryx also contributed vocals to the 1985 anti-apartheid song "Sun City".

== Critical reception ==
Professional ratings
Review scores
Source	Rating
All Music Guide to Rock	3/5 stars
Courier News	3/4 stars
The Encyclopedia of Popular Music	3/5 stars
MusicHound R&B: The Essential Album Guide	2/5 stars
Record-Journal	B+

The Whig-Standard said, "Strange things still go on, but now they're frills on music that is unmistakable dance-hall rhythm-and-blues. The result is Hendryx's most accessible album yet." The Courier News praised "some of the toughest vocals around today". The Houston Post opined that most of the songs are "all groove and great vocal jet sounds and nothing in between—things like melody." The Record-Journal called it "another hot album of funk ... with definite pop leanings". The Salt Lake Tribune said that Hendryx "sizzles with raw sensuality." The Los Angeles Times included The Heat on its list of the best albums of 1985.

The Trouser Press Record Guide stated that the songs "take maximum advantage of the musical interplay possible with electronic percussion and studio wizardry."

== Track listing ==
No.	Title	Length
1.	"Revolutionary Dance"
2.	"A Girl Like That"
3.	"The Heat Pt. I"
4.	"I Need Love"
5.	"If Looks Could Kill (D.O.A.)"
6.	"Rock This House"
7.	"The Heat Pt. II"
8.	"Time"
