= Take It So Hard =

1988 single by Keith Richards

Single by Keith Richards

from the album Talk Is Cheap
- B-side: "I Could Have Stood You Up"
- Released: 1988
- Recorded: August 1987 – May 1988
- Genre: Rock
- Length: 3:11
- Label: Virgin
- Songwriter(s): K. Richards/S. Jordan
- Producer(s): Keith Richards and Steve Jordan

Keith Richards singles chronology
"Run Rudolph Run" (1979)	"Take It So Hard" (1988)	"You Don't Move Me" (1988)

"Take It So Hard" is the first single from Keith Richards' first solo record, Talk Is Cheap. The long-time Rolling Stones guitarist recorded the record after bandmate Mick Jagger refused to tour in 1986 in support of the album Dirty Work. The second song of the eleven track record, it is a powerful example of vocal rock harmonies and rhythmic guitar, piano and percussion syncopation, with an overlay of vocal tracks that bury the lyrics within the push and pull of the music. It received heavy airplay on US rock radio, reaching #3 on Billboard's Mainstream Rock Tracks.

Richards described writing and recording Talk is Cheap as a bit by bit accumulation of song threads and recording sessions. Except for "Make No Mistake", which he said came to him all at once, "Take It So Hard" like other songs was put together through several recording sessions in 1987 and 1988.

The song was reviewed in Rolling Stone magazine positively, but Richards never explained the lyrics.

The song was discussed in the Wall Street Journal's weekly music column, week of March 25, 2019, by Keith Richards and Steve Jordan. The song started with a guitar riff, as is usual for Keith Richards, and he quickly came up with the refrain. The rest of the lyrics developed from a vowel exercise that Keith Richards has also used on other songs, to see what fits the music, and once he had vowels he came up with words to go with the vowels.

Kurt Loder called it the "perfect Keith single".

The music video for the song shows Richards and the X-Pensive Winos- the name for Richards' backing band- in the ruins of a sports stadium playing in the nuclear dust after an atomic bomb has destroyed everyone but the cat-like musician.

"Take It So Hard" led off the 1988 concert tour sets, and was played in the 1992–1993 Main Offender dates as well.

== Personnel ==
- Keith Richards: lead and background vocal, guitar
- Waddy Wachtel: guitar
- Steve Jordan: background vocal, bass
- Charley Drayton: drums
- Ivan Neville: piano and keyboards
