= Live at the Hollywood Palladium, December 15, 1988 =

Live album by Keith Richards and the X-Pensive Winos
- Released: 10 December 1991
- Recorded: 15 December 1988
- Venue: Hollywood Palladium, Hollywood, California, US
- Genre: Rock and roll
- Length: 67:30
- Label: Virgin
- Producer: Keith Richards; Steve Jordan; Don Smith

Keith Richards chronology
Talk Is Cheap (1988)	Live at the Hollywood Palladium, December 15, 1988 (1991)	Main Offender (1992)

Professional ratings
Review scores
Source	Rating
AllMusic	3/5 stars
Rolling Stone	4/5 stars

Live at the Hollywood Palladium, December 15, 1988 is a live album by Keith Richards, released on 10 December 1991 in the United States and 24 February 1992 in the United Kingdom. Recorded during a brief American tour in support of Richards debut solo album Talk Is Cheap in late 1988, Richards is supported by a set of musicians and friends dubbed "The X-Pensive Winos". The Winos included Waddy Wachtel, Steve Jordan, Charley Drayton, Ivan Neville, and Sarah Dash. Longtime Rolling Stones contributor Bobby Keys also plays saxophone.

At the end of the opening song, Richards says that the Palladium is "a stage I've been thrown off many times"; he was referring to Chuck Berry's concert there on January 21, 1972, when Richards tried to perform with his idol, but was purportedly kicked off for playing too loudly, though Berry later claimed he had not recognized Richards.

Richards' set during the tour was composed primarily of material from his solo debut album – he played nine of the eleven songs from the record – and also included many of his Rolling Stones lead vocal appearances, with "Too Rude", "Happy", and "Connection", along with "Time Is on My Side" featuring Sarah Dash on lead vocals. "Before They Make Me Run" and "Little T&A" turned up on bootlegs such as L.A. Connection.

Live at the Hollywood Palladium, December 15, 1988 was recorded, videotaped, and ultimately released as an album at the suggestion of Jane Rose, Richards tenured manager. Officially credited as executive producer, she encouraged Richards to consider the official release after showing the reluctant star bootlegs of inferior audio quality. The album was released in North America during the Christmas season, in the wake of the Stones live album Flashpoint, and before the recording of Richards' second solo studio album, Main Offender.

== Track listing ==
All songs by Keith Richards and Steve Jordan, except where noted.

1. "Take It So Hard" – 4:27
2. "How I Wish" – 4:05
3. "I Could Have Stood You Up" – 4:30
4. "Too Rude" (Lindon Roberts, Sly Dunbar, Robbie Shakespeare) – 7:46
5. "Make No Mistake" – 6:30
6. "Time Is on My Side" (Norman Meade) – 4:32
7. "Big Enough" – 3:46
8. "Whip It Up" – 5:35
9. "Locked Away" – 5:49
10. "Struggle" – 4:35
11. "Happy" (Mick Jagger, Keith Richards) – 7:08
12. "Connection" (Mick Jagger, Keith Richards) – 2:33
13. "Rockawhile" – 6:16

== Personnel ==
- Keith Richards – guitar and lead vocals

The X-Pensive Winos

- Waddy Wachtel – guitar and backing vocals
- Steve Jordan – drums, backing vocals, bass guitar on "Take It So Hard", and keyboards on "I Could Have Stood You Up"
- Charley Drayton – bass guitar, backing vocals, and drums on "Take It So Hard" and "I Could Have Stood You Up"
- Ivan Neville – keyboards, backing vocals, guitar on "Happy", and bass guitar on "I Could Have Stood You Up"
- Sarah Dash – backing vocals, percussion, lead vocals on "Time Is on My Side", and duet on "Make No Mistake"
- Bobby Keys – saxophone

== Charts ==
Chart performance for Live at the Hollywood Palladium – December 15, 1988
Chart (2020)	Peak position
Australian Albums (ARIA)	169
Austrian Albums (Ö3 Austria)	49
German Albums (Offizielle Top 100)	30
Spanish Albums (PROMUSICAE)	56
