= Crosseyed Heart =

Studio album by Keith Richards
- Released: 18 September 2015
- Genres: Rock, rock and roll, blues, country, reggae
- Length: 57:57
- Label: Republic
- Producers: Keith Richards, Steve Jordan

Keith Richards chronology
Vintage Vinos (2010)	Crosseyed Heart (2015)

Singles from Crosseyed Heart
- 1. "Trouble" Released: 17 July 2015; 2. "Heartstopper" Released: 6 November 2015

Crosseyed Heart is the third solo album by Rolling Stones guitarist Keith Richards. Released on 18 September 2015, it is Richards' first studio album in 23 years since Main Offender. As with his first two albums, it was recorded with his band the X-Pensive Winos.

The first single from the album, "Trouble", was released on 17 July 2015, prior to the album's release.

== Critical reception ==
Professional ratings
Aggregate scores
Source	Rating
Metacritic	76/100
Review scores
Source	Rating
The Guardian	4/5 stars
Mojo	4/5 stars
NME	4/5 stars
Paste	9/10
Rolling Stone	3.5/5 stars
Slant Magazine	3.5/5 stars
AllMusic	4/5 stars

Crosseyed Heart was met with positive reviews from music critics. At Metacritic, which assigns a normalized rating out of 100 to reviews from mainstream critics, the album has received an average score of 76, based on 19 reviews, indicating "generally favourable reviews". Robert Christgau wrote, "it sounds like some kind of Honorable Mention--songwriting deliberately generic."

== Track listing ==
All tracks are written by Keith Richards and Steve Jordan, except where noted

No.	Title	Writer(s)	Length
1.	"Crosseyed Heart"	Keith Richards	1:52
2.	"Heartstopper"		3:04
3.	"Amnesia"		3:35
4.	"Robbed Blind"	Richards	4:00
5.	"Trouble"		4:17
6.	"Love Overdue"	Gregory Isaacs	3:28
7.	"Nothing On Me"		3:47
8.	"Suspicious"	Richards	3:42
9.	"Blues In the Morning"		4:25
10.	"Something For Nothing"		3:28
11.	"Illusion"	Richards, Jordan, Norah Jones	3:48
12.	"Just a Gift"		4:01
13.	"Goodnight Irene"	Huddie Ledbetter, Alan Lomax	5:46
14.	"Substantial Damage"		4:21
15.	"Lover’s Plea"	Richards, Jordan, David Porter	4:23
Total length:			57:57

Best Buy & Japanese Version
No.	Title	Writer(s)	Length
16.	"Love Overdue (ft. Lee "Scratch" Perry)" (Bonus track)	Isaacs	3:28
Total length:			61:24

== Personnel ==
The X-Pensive Winos

- Keith Richards – lead vocals (1–15), acoustic guitar (1–8, 10–14), bass (2, 3, 5–10, 14, 15), electric guitar (2, 3, 5–12, 14, 15), piano (2–4, 8–12), backing vocals (3, 5, 14, 15), keyboards (6), electric sitar (8), Wurlitzer (8), Farfisa (8, 11), tiple (12)
- Waddy Wachtel – electric guitar (2, 5, 8, 10), acoustic guitar (8), backing vocals (8), slide guitar (14)
- Steve Jordan – drums (2–15), backing vocals (2–7, 9–15), percussion (5, 6), piano (6), congas (7) vibes (11), timpani (11), horn arrangement (15)
- Bobby Keys – saxophone (3, 9)
- Ivan Neville – Hammond organ (6), backing vocals (6), Wurlitzer (15)
- Babi Floyd – backup vocals (11)
- Sarah Dash – backing vocals (14)

Additional musicians

- Norah Jones – co-lead vocals (11)
- Bernard Fowler – backing vocals (5, 6, 11–13, 15)
- Larry Campbell – violin (2), pedal steel guitar (2, 4), fiddle (12)
- Meegan Voss – backing vocals (3, 8)
- Paul Nowinski – bass (4), viola da gamba (12)
- Kevin Batchelor – trumpet (6)
- Clifton Anderson – trombone (6)
- Charles Dougherty – tenor saxophone (6)
- Aaron Neville – backing vocals (7)
- Charles Hodges – Hammond organ (7, 10, 14), piano (10)
- David Paich – Farfisa organ (8)
- Harlem Gospel Choir – backing vocals (10)
- Pino Palladino – bass (11)
- Blondie Chaplin – backing vocals (11–13, 15)
- Pierre DeBeauport – acoustic guitar (14)
- Ben Cauley – trumpet (15)
- Spooner Oldham – Hammond organ (15)
- Jack Hale – trombone (15)
- Lannie McMillan – tenor saxophone (15)
- Jim Horn – baritone saxophone (15)
- Lester Snell – horn arrangement (15)

== Charts ==
=== Weekly charts ===
Chart (2015)	Peak position
Argentine Albums (CAPIF)	1
Australian Albums (ARIA)	15
Austrian Albums (Ö3 Austria)	1
Belgian Albums (Ultratop Flanders)	8
Belgian Albums (Ultratop Wallonia)	8
Canadian Albums (Billboard)	11
Czech Albums (ČNS IFPI)	6
Danish Albums (Hitlisten)	8
Dutch Albums (Album Top 100)	4
Finnish Albums (Suomen virallinen lista)	25
French Albums (SNEP)	7
German Albums (Offizielle Top 100)	3
Greek Albums (IFPI)	6
Irish Albums (IRMA)	19
Italian Albums (FIMI)	7
Japanese Albums (Oricon)	6
New Zealand Albums (RMNZ)	5
Norwegian Albums (VG-lista)	4
Polish Albums (ZPAV)	16
Portuguese Albums (AFP)	14
South Korean Albums (Circle)	81
Scottish Albums (Official Charts)	4
Spanish Albums (Promusicae)	12
Swedish Albums (Sverigetopplistan)	7
Swiss Albums (Schweizer Hitparade)	4
UK Albums (Official Charts)	7
US Billboard 200	11
US Top Rock Albums (Billboard)	4

=== Year-end charts ===
Chart (2015)	Position
Belgian Albums (Ultratop Flanders)	159
Belgian Albums (Ultratop Wallonia)	191
