= Female Trouble (album) =

Studio album by Nona Hendryx
- Released: 1987
- Label: EMI America
- Producer: Dan Hartman, Nona Hendryx

Nona Hendryx chronology
The Heat (1985)	Female Trouble (1987)	Skin Diver (1989)

Female Trouble is an album by the American musician Nona Hendryx, released in 1987. It was her first album for EMI America. The album is dedicated to Winnie Mandela. "Why Should I Cry?" was the first single. Female Trouble peaked at No. 96 on the Billboard 200.

== Production ==
Female Trouble was produced mostly by Dan Hartman and Hendryx; Hendryx was unable to find a producer to helm the entire album. Jimmy Jam and Terry Lewis, Jellybean Johnson, and the System also contributed to the album. "Baby Go-Go" was written by Prince; it contains backing vocals from George Clinton and Mavis Staples. "Winds of Change (Mandela to Mandela)", a duet with Peter Gabriel, was inspired by letters sent to Nelson Mandela by Winnie. Bass player T. M. Stevens raps on "Big Fun".

== Critical reception ==
Professional ratings
Review scores
Source	Rating
AllMusic	3/5 stars
Los Angeles Times	1/4 stars
MusicHound Rock: The Essential Album Guide	4/5 stars

Trouser Press wrote that "Hendryx's irrepressible full-throttle approach makes this an invigorating blast, a tough-minded party record about sex and sexual politics." The Washington Post stated: "Smarter than the average dance tracks, the nine sonically intriguing songs give up new details after repeated listening." The Los Angeles Times opined that, "grossly over-produced by a revolving crew of knob-twirlers, Female Trouble is a textbook example of a funk-rock style best described as Thunderdome Pop."

The St. Petersburg Times deemed "Rhythm of Change" "a hearty heavy metal tune that could match hooks and guts with most any of rock radio's staple songs." The Star Tribune called the album "long on glittery form and short on substance." USA Today determined that Hendryx "is too old and too smart to settle on playing the funky ingenue... Instead, she alternately—and comfortably—plays sexy and serious." The Sydney Morning Herald concluded that, "ballads excepted, it's Hendryx's most impressive album for years."

== Track listing ==
No.	Title	Length
1.	"I Know What You Need (Pygmy's Confession)"
2.	"Big Fun"
3.	"Baby Go-Go"
4.	"Rhythm of Change"
5.	"Why Should I Cry?"
6.	"Too Hot to Handle"
7.	"Winds of Change (Mandela to Mandela)"
8.	"Female Trouble"
9.	"Drive Me Wild"
