= Johnnie B. Bad =

Studio album by Johnnie Johnson
- Released: 1991
- Genre: Rock and roll, R&B, blues
- Label: Elektra/Nonesuch
- Producer: Terry Adams, Keith Richards

Johnnie Johnson chronology
Rockin' Eighty-Eights (1990)	Johnnie B. Bad (1991)	That'll Work (1993)

Johnnie B. Bad is an album by the American pianist Johnnie Johnson, released in 1991. The album was part of Elektra Records' American Explorer series, which was dedicated to traditional American musical styles. Johnnie B. Bad was nominated for a Grammy Award for "Best Traditional Blues Album".

== Production ==
Bernie Worrell, Keith Richards and Eric Clapton were among the many admiring musicians who played on Johnnie B. Bad. The majority of the album was produced by Terry Adams; Richards produced two of the album's tracks. "Stepped in What!?" and "Tanqueray" marked the first time that Johnson had sung on record.

== Critical reception ==
Professional ratings
Review scores
Source	Rating
AllMusic	4/5 stars
Robert Christgau	(dud)
The Encyclopedia of Popular Music	3/5 stars
Los Angeles Times	3/4 stars
MusicHound R&B: The Essential Album Guide	3.5/5 stars
Orlando Sentinel	5/5 stars
Vancouver Sun	3.5/4 stars

The Orlando Sentinel wrote that "Johnson isn't an outstanding singer, but his earthy, relaxed voice suits his playing, and his rich storyteller's voice is delightful on the talking blues 'Stepped in What!?'" Billboard called the album "a funky delight," writing that Johnson is "a soulful master of the 88s." The Courier Journal concluded that "the emotion he invests is as impressive as his technical skills."

The Los Angeles Times opined that, "from blues dirges to rollicking New Orleans R&B, Johnson's ivory tickling remains as lively as it was four decades ago." The Philadelphia Inquirer stated that Johnson's "jolly piano makes serious connections between the blues, New Orleans R&B, Oscar Peterson flourishes and boogie-woogie." The Austin American-Statesman thought that Johnnie B. Bad "suffers slightly from the sideman syndrome."

AllMusic wrote that Johnson "lays down bluesy licks and laconic vocals that mark him as both a master of the blues and a father of rock & roll."

== Track listing ==
No.	Title	Length
1.	"Tanqueray"	4:51
2.	"Hush Oh Hush"	3:19
3.	"Johnnie B. Bad"	2:32
4.	"Creek Mud"	5:24
5.	"Fault Line Tremor"	3:40
6.	"Stepped in What!?"	4:08
7.	"Can You Stand It"	2:42
8.	"Key to the Highway"	3:19
9.	"Blues #572"	3:28
10.	"Baby What's Wrong"	3:35
11.	"Cow Cow Blues"	3:12
12.	"Movin' Out"	3:51
