= The Art of Defense =

Studio album by Nona Hendryx
- Released: 1984
- Studio: Electric Lady (New York City)
- Genres: Funk, R&B
- Label: RCA
- Producers: Nona Hendryx, Material

Nona Hendryx chronology
Nona (1983)	The Art of Defense (1984)	The Heat (1985)

The Art of Defense is the third studio album by the American musician Nona Hendryx. It was released in 1984 by RCA Records.

The album peaked at No. 167 on the Billboard 200. Hendryx supported the album with a North American tour.

== Production ==
The album was produced by Hendryx and Bill Laswell and Material. Afrika Bambaataa and Bernie Worrell appear on the album. Hendryx claimed that the album is about emotional vulnerability and the rejection of aggression. "The Life" was cowritten by Kevan Staples.

== Critical reception ==
Professional ratings
Review scores
Source	Rating
AllMusic	2/5 stars
Calgary Herald	A
Robert Christgau	C+
The Encyclopedia of Popular Music	3/5 stars
MusicHound R&B: The Essential Album Guide	1.5/5 stars
Philadelphia Daily News	3/4 stars

Robert Christgau wrote that Hendryx "just isn't as talented as you wish she was, and on this follow-up her undifferentiated melodies come back to haunt her." Trouser Press called the album "technically excellent and funky as hell ... also boring beyond words." The Washington Post thought that "Hendryx has stretched her distinctive sound out over six- and seven-minute arrangements, but the melodies are strangely absent and the material doesn't merit the longer workouts."

The Philadelphia Daily News declared: "If this were a just world, Hendryx would have Grace Jones's reputation. After all, she's a better singer, an intelligent writer, her dance grooves have soul, her musicians are among the best in the world and she's relatably sensual, not to mention tougher than Jones ever dreamed." The Calgary Herald labeled The Art of Defense "a sultry combination of throbbing dance rhythms and scintillating vocal work."

AllMusic deemed the album "another case of some very talented folks making a very bland record."

== Track listing ==
No.	Title	Length
1.	"I Sweat (Going Through the Motions)"	6:12
2.	"Soft Targets"	4:21
3.	"The Life"	6:31
4.	"To the Bone"	5:18
5.	"Electricity"	3:52
6.	"Ghost Love"	4:14
7.	"I Want You"	4:21

== Personnel ==
- Nona Hendryx – lead vocals
- Eddie Martinez – guitar
- Bill Laswell – bass, tapes
- Bernie Worrell – synthesizer, Clavinet, piano
- Jeff Bova – synthesizer on "I Sweat (Going Through the Motions)" and "I Want You"
- Trevor Gales – drums
- Michael Beinhorn – DMX drum machine
- Aïyb Dieng, Daniel Ponce – percussion
- Afrika Bambaataa (tracks: 1, 4), Amad Henderson (tracks: 1, 4), B.J. Nelson (tracks: 1, 2, 6), Benny Diggs (tracks: 1, 2, 5–7), Dolette McDonald (tracks: 1, 2, 7), Fonzi Thornton (tracks: 1, 2, 5–7), Fred Fowler (tracks: 1, 4), Mr. Biggs (tracks: 1, 4), Nona Hendryx (tracks: 1–6), Ray Simpson (tracks: 5, 7), Kevin Owens (track: 3) – backing vocals

Technical

- Robert Musso – engineer
