= Sun City (song) =

1985 single by Artists United Against Apartheid

Single by Artists United Against Apartheid

from the album Sun City
- B-side: "Not So Far Away (Dub Version)"
- Released: October 16, 1985
- Genre: Protest song; new wave; dance; R&B; hip-hop
- Length: 5:45
- Label: Manhattan
- Songwriter: Steven Van Zandt
- Producers: Steven Van Zandt; Arthur Baker

"Sun City" is a 1985 protest song written by Steven Van Zandt, produced by Van Zandt and Arthur Baker and recorded by Artists United Against Apartheid to convey opposition to the South African minority regime's policy of racial segregation, known as apartheid. The lyrics declared that all the artists involved would refuse to perform at the Sun City resort in South Africa.

== Recording ==
Steven Van Zandt was interested in writing a song about the Sun City resort, now in the North West Province, to make parallels with the plight of Native Americans. Danny Schechter, at the time a journalist with ABC News' 20/20, suggested that the song should be a different kind of "We Are the World", or as Schechter explained, "a song about change not charity, freedom not famine".

Schechter suggested that Van Zandt include the names of the artists who had played at Sun City in defiance of the cultural boycott on South Africa imposed for its policy of racial segregation, known as apartheid. "I was probably still thinking of 20/20's exposé of conservative Africanists 15 years earlier", says Schechter.

References to performers who had played at Sun City appeared in the demo but were omitted from the final version. The songwriter Paul Simon declined to contribute, as he felt the list of names was inappropriate: "You've got to give people a chance to say, 'I shouldn't have done that.'" Among the names was Simon's friend Linda Ronstadt. Simon defended Ronstadt, saying: "I know that her intention was never to support the government there ... She made a mistake. She's extremely liberal in her political thinking and unquestionably anti-apartheid." Simon also felt his upcoming album Graceland, recorded in South Africa and released the following year, would be his "own statement" on the issue. Ronstadt provided guest vocals on Graceland.

When Van Zandt was finished writing "Sun City", he, Baker and Schechter spent the next several months searching for artists to participate in recording it. Van Zandt initially declined to invite Bruce Springsteen, not wanting to take advantage of their friendship, but Schechter had no problem asking himself; Springsteen accepted the invitation. Van Zandt also had reservations about inviting jazz giant Miles Davis, whom Schechter also contacted; with minimal persuasion, Davis also accepted. Eventually, Van Zandt, Baker and Schechter gathered a wide array of artists, including Afrika Bambaataa, Ray Barretto, Stiv Bators, Pat Benatar, Big Youth, Rubén Blades, Kurtis Blow, Bono, Jackson Browne and Daryl Hannah (his girlfriend at the time), Ron Carter, Clarence Clemons, Jimmy Cliff, George Clinton, DJ Kool Herc, Bob Dylan, Fat Boys, Peter Gabriel, Peter Garrett, Grandmaster Melle Mel, Daryl Hall and John Oates, Herbie Hancock, Nona Hendryx, Kashif, Eddie Kendricks, Darlene Love, Michael Monroe, Bonnie Raitt, Joey Ramone, Lou Reed, the Rolling Stones' Keith Richards and Ronnie Wood, David Ruffin, Run-DMC, Gil Scott-Heron, Ringo Starr and his son Zak Starkey, Pete Townshend, Peter Wolf and Bobby Womack.

== Composition ==
The song combines elements of hip-hop (which was beginning to achieve mainstream popularity at the time), R&B, and hard rock. The main hook is multiple successive artists singing "I, I, I, I, I, I", followed by all the artists together singing "ain't gonna play Sun City!"

A music video directed by Jonathan Demme with Godley & Creme was also produced.

== Commercial performance ==
"Sun City" reached No. 38 on the Billboard Hot 100 chart in December 1985 (and #42 Cash Box). Only about half of American radio stations played "Sun City". Some stations objected to the lyrics' explicit criticism of US President Ronald Reagan's policy of "constructive engagement", particularly George Clinton's and Joey Ramone's lines in the song "Our government tells us / We're doing all we can / Constructive engagement is / Ronald Reagan's plan." (Ramone also expressed open discontent and criticism towards Reagan with the Ramones song "Bonzo Goes to Bitburg".) "Sun City" was banned in apartheid South Africa itself.

The song did somewhat better overseas, reaching No. 21 on the UK Singles Chart, No. 8 in Ireland, and peaking at No. 4 in both Australia and New Zealand. It achieved chart action in a number of European countries, becoming a Top 5 hit in Sweden, Belgium and The Netherlands. It was also a top ten single in Canada in December 1985 and January 1986.

== Reception ==
Robert Palmer of The New York Times hailed "Sun City" as the year's best single, writing that "its steamroller rhythm was pure New York street-funk.... Of the year's so-called charity or benefit records and events, only 'Sun City' dared to include such a broad cross-section of the global pop community. The result was a rhythmically irresistible, uniquely powerful musical milestone."

Billboard magazine's review of the single stated that it "showcases an overwhelming array of all-star voices, keeps up a blistering urban/dance tempo, and pulls no punches on the message." John Leland at Spin said, "while the catchy hooks gather momentum on the main vocal lines, the hottest action is between them when everyone fights to scat the fill. Even the breakfast-cereal stars here sing hard and gruff."

"Sun City" was selected as Record of the Year by some of the most influential music critics, because it topped the prestigious international Pazz & Jop Critics Poll for best single of the year.

=== Documentary ===
Van Zandt and Schechter also struggled to get their documentary seen. Public Broadcasting Service (PBS) refused to broadcast the non-profit film The Making of Sun City even though it won the International Documentary Association's top honors in 1986. PBS claimed the featured artists were also involved in making the film and were therefore "self-promoting". In 1987, WNYC-TV, the New York City-owned public television station, aired an updated version of the documentary, produced by filmmaker Bill Lichtenstein along with Schechter. The film included updates about the Sun City resort and apartheid, as well as the success of the Sun City video. In addition to airing the documentary, WNYC-TV made the film available over the PBS system to public television stations across the country for broadcast.

=== Impact ===
The album and single raised more than US$1 million for anti-apartheid projects, but it paled in comparison with the popular and financial success of "We Are the World". It premiered at the United Nations, thanks to the Special Committee Against Apartheid and UN officers such as Aracelly Santana.

Oliver Tambo and the ANC's school in Tanzania "was sure happy when we gave them a big check", according to Schechter.

In South Africa, "Sun City" inspired musician Johnny Clegg to create a local organization similar to Van Zandt's. "Sun City" also became the catalyst for the 1988–91 South Africa Now TV series.

== Other anti-apartheid songs ==
"Sun City" was not the first pop song to attack apartheid. Gil Scott-Heron had recorded his song "Johannesburg" in 1975, followed by Peter Gabriel's "Biko" (1980), Randy Newman's "Christmas in Capetown" (1983), the Special AKA's "Nelson Mandela" (1984), and Stevie Wonder's "It's Wrong (Apartheid)" (1985). The integrated South African band Juluka, featuring Johnny Clegg, also recorded songs in the 1980s that criticized apartheid.
