= Nona Hendryx =

American musician (born 1944)

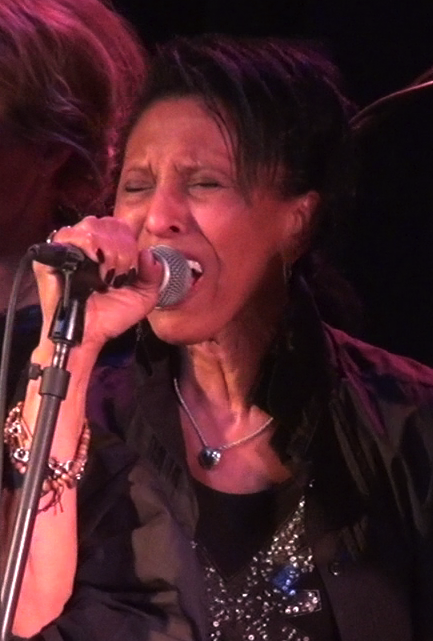
- Hendryx performing in 2011

Background information
- Born: Nona Bernis Hendryx; October 9, 1944 (age 82); Trenton, New Jersey, U.S.
- Genres: Funk; soul; pop; R&B; hard rock; funk rock; new wave; new-age
- Occupations: Musician; songwriter; record producer
- Instruments: Vocals; piano; guitar
- Years active: 1961–present
- Labels: ZE; Epic; Arista; RCA; Private Music; EMI; Righteous Babe
- Spouse: Vicki Wickham (m. 2011; died 2026)

Nona Bernis Hendryx (born October 9, 1944) is an American vocalist, record producer, songwriter, musician, and author. Hendryx is known for her work as a solo artist as well as for being one-third of the trio Labelle, who had a hit with "Lady Marmalade". In 1977, Hendryx released her self-titled debut solo album, a commercial failure that resulted in Hendryx being released from her recording contract. In the early 1980s, Hendryx sang with experimental funk group Material, achieving the hit "Busting Out".

Material produced her second album, Nona (1983), containing the modest Top 30 R&B and Dance charts hit "Keep It Confidential". The album cut "Transformation" became a Hendryx signature song. In 1985, Hendryx wrote and recorded the Grammy nominated song "Rock This House" with Keith Richards from her fourth solo album The Heat (1985). Hendryx went on to record the theme for Moving Violations and "I Sweat (Going Through the Motions)", a commercial hit for Hendryx from the Jamie Lee Curtis film Perfect. She also took part in the Artists United Against Apartheid project with the international hit, "Sun City", from the album of the same title. Hendryx's 1987 single "Why Should I Cry?", from her fifth album became a Top 10 R&B chart hit. She recorded "Transparent" from the 1988 Eddie Murphy vehicle, Coming to America. Hendryx received an Emmy nomination as a composer of People: A Musical Celebration in 1996 for Outstanding Music and Lyrics.

She has also appeared on the third season of The L Word. Her music has ranged from soul, funk, and R&B to hard rock, new wave, and new-age. She stated in an interview that her family's last name was originally spelled with an 'i' and that she is a distant cousin of guitarist Jimi Hendrix.

== Biography ==
=== Early career ===
Nona Bernis Hendryx, who is of African American heritage, was born on October 9, 1944, in Trenton, New Jersey. There, she met fellow New Jersey native Sarah Dash and later met Philadelphia-born singer Patricia Holte (Patti LaBelle). After a short-lived tenure as a member of the Del-Capris, Hendryx and Dash formed a singing group with Holte (once the lead singer of a girl group in Philadelphia called The Ordettes). In 1961, Cindy Birdsong, from Camden, New Jersey, became the fourth member of the group, who became the Bluebelles and signed their first deal with Newtown Records.

After the release of their debut hit, 1962's "I Sold My Heart to the Junkman", their name altered again to Patti LaBelle and the Bluebelles. Hendryx's husky alto differed from Dash's sharp soprano, LaBelle's mezzo-soprano and Birdsong's second soprano. During this tenure, the group became known for their emotional live performances and their renditions of classic standards such as "You'll Never Walk Alone", "Over The Rainbow", and "Danny Boy". The group often found themselves competing against girl groups such as the Chantels, Shirelles, and the Supremes. In 1967, Hendryx, LaBelle, and Dash were shocked to discover that Birdsong had secretly joined the Supremes after Florence Ballard was ousted from the group by Motown. Different members of the group were in touch with Birdsong over the years. Birdsong's relationships with the Bluebelles healed and they came together again for the ceremony when the group won an R&B Foundation Lifetime Achievement Award in 1999.

=== Labelle ===
For the next three years, the group struggled to compete against the changing musical landscape for which their girl group sound had fallen out of favor with popular audiences. In 1971, they moved to England, where they had a cult fan base, and on the advice of Vicki Wickham, changed their name to Labelle and ditched the dresses and bouffant wigs for jeans and Afros. Releasing transitional albums including 1971's Labelle and 1972's Moon Shadow, the group recorded material that included sexual and political subject matter – unheard of for an all-female black group. The transition was hard for lead singer LaBelle, who was a fan of the group's early-era ballads, but she eventually gave in. Member Dash remained neutral throughout the tenure of the group. Shortly after releasing Labelle, the group became the opening act for The Who, whose producer Kit Lambert had produced the group's Warner debut. They also opened for Laura Nyro during that same time and sang backup on her album Gonna Take a Miracle.

Beginning with the Moon Shadow album, Hendryx became the chief songwriter for most of the group's records while LaBelle and Dash occasionally wrote their own material. After successfully opening for the Rolling Stones during the group's American tour in 1973, the group released Pressure Cookin', where they once again adopted a new look as "glam rock, space-age divas". As a songwriter, Hendryx subsequently wrote powerful ballads ("You Turn Me On" and "Nightbird" from Nightbirds, "Going Down Makes Me Shiver" from Labelle's final album, Chameleon), and a wealth of more uptempo numbers ("Space Children", "Messin' with My Mind", "Gypsy Moths", and "Who's Watching the Watcher"). Her themes were unconventional, diverse, and often experimental. Her composition "A Man in a Trenchcoat (Voodoo)" from Chameleon also marked Hendryx's first time singing lead vocal on an album. In 1974, the group hit gold with the release of Nightbirds following the release of the smash hit "Lady Marmalade". In her memoir Don't Block the Blessings, Labelle frontwoman Patti LaBelle attributed the band's 1976 breakup to musical and personal tensions within the group. Labelle, Dash, and Hendryx all embarked on solo careers; Wickham stayed on with Hendryx to manage her solo career.

=== Solo career ===
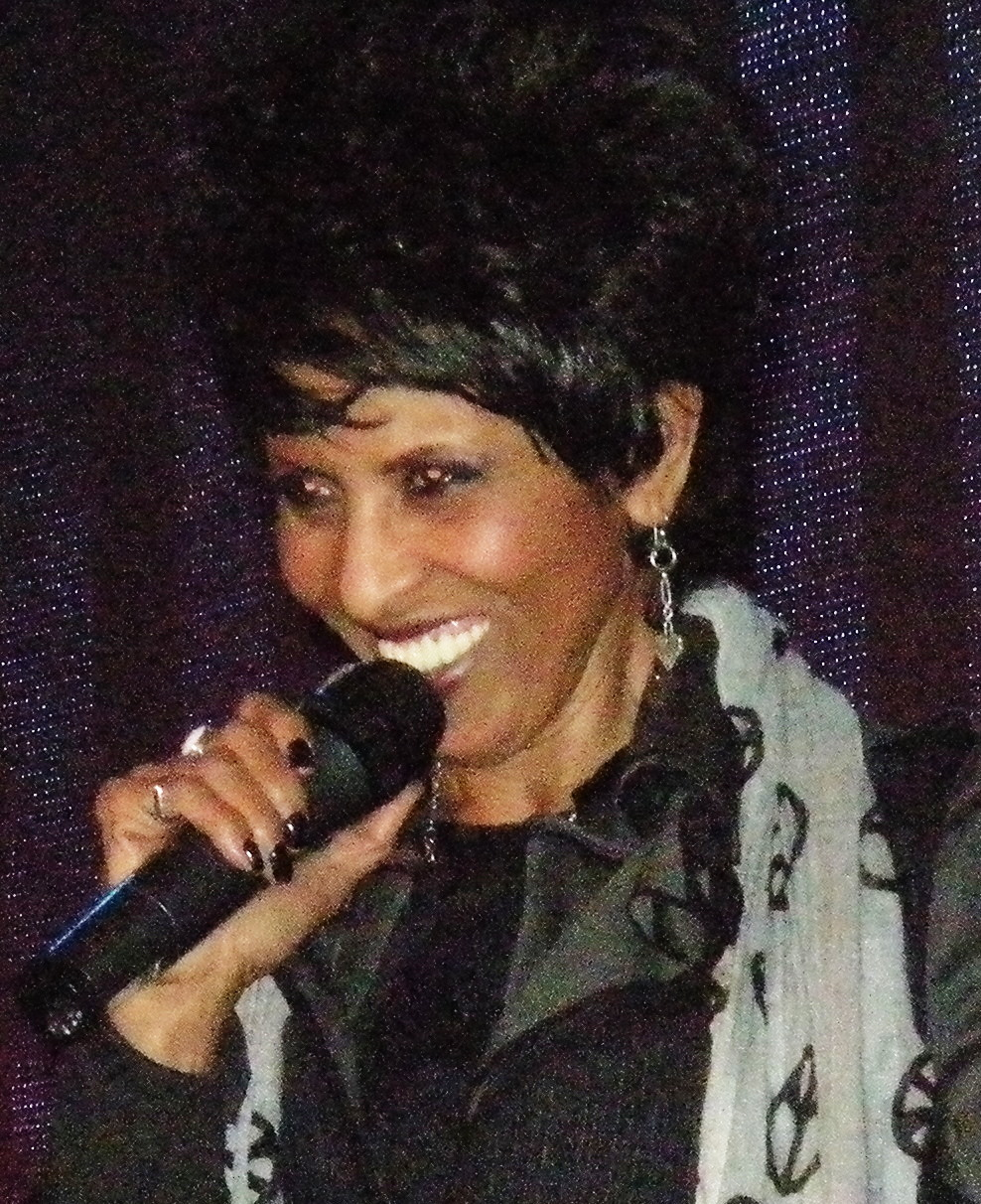
Nona Hendryx appearing at 2009 Pop Conference, Experience Music Project, Seattle, Washington. (April 6, 2009)

In 1977, Hendryx released her first solo album, a self-titled collection. A blend of soul and hard rock, it contained notable tracks such as her cover of "Winning" and the ballad "Leaving Here Today". It quickly disappeared from the shelves, and Hendryx was dropped from Epic. Subsequently, she recorded four singles for Arista (London), which also did not achieve chart success. She did find success doing session work during this period, most notably providing background vocals for Talking Heads and touring with them, appearing first at the major Heatwave festival in August 1980. She contributed to Dusty Springfield's album It Begins Again in 1978 (the first of Springfield's multiple attempts at a comeback) by writing the song "Checkmate".

In the early 1980s, Hendryx fronted her own progressive art rock group, Zero Cool, which included guitarist Naux (China Shop, Richard Hell), bassist Michael Allison (Darshan Ambient), guitarist Kevin Fullen and drummer Jimmy Allington. Simultaneously, she sang with experimental funk group Material, achieving a giant club hit with "Busting Out". She had two other major club hits soon after: a dance remake of The Supremes' "Love Is Like an Itching in My Heart", and, in a lead vocal guest spot for the Cage, "Do What You Wanna Do". Material also produced her second album Nona in 1983. The hip, contemporary dance sound of this album proved to be more charts-compatible, with the disco music times, and the single "Keep It Confidential" becoming a modest R&B hit written by Ellie Greenwich, Jeff Kent, Ellen Foley, and a remix of "B-boys" finding major success on the dance charts. "Transformation" became a Hendryx staple, and later was covered by Fierce Ruling Diva. Another particularly noteworthy track on the album is the ballad "Design for Living", which featured guests Laurie Anderson, Gina Shock of The Go-Go's, Valerie Simpson of Ashford & Simpson, Tina Weymouth of Tom Tom Club and Talking Heads, Nancy Wilson of Heart, and former bandmate Patti LaBelle.

In the mid-1980s, Hendryx was recruited by RCA to record songs for various soundtracks, including the theme for Moving Violations; "I Sweat (Going Through the Motions)", a commercial hit for Hendryx from the Jamie Lee Curtis film Perfect; and "Transparent" from the Eddie Murphy vehicle, Coming to America. Her album The Art of Defense was released in 1984.

In 1985, Hendryx wrote and recorded "Rock This House" with Keith Richards from her album The Heat. The song was nominated for a Grammy Award for Best Rock Vocal Performance, Female at the 28th Grammy Awards. The same year, the MTV broadcast of the video "I Need Love" co-written by Jean Beauvoir, stirred some controversy for featuring drag queens. As a result, it quickly was removed from MTV's playlist.

In the same year, she also took part in the Artists United Against Apartheid project with the song, "Sun City", from the album of the same title. The song was recorded along with other artists Bruce Springsteen, Little Steven, Bono from U2, Eddie Kendricks, Hall & Oates, Bobby Womack, Lou Reed and many others. This was one of the greatest and strongest protest songs against South Africa's Apartheid during those days.

Her biggest commercial success came with 1987's single "Why Should I Cry?", a top 5 R&B hit which also reached No. 58 on the Billboard 100. The accompanying album, Female Trouble, boasted an impressive list of contributors, including Dan Hartman (who also served as a producer), Peter Gabriel, Prince ("Baby Go Go"), George Clinton, David Van Tieghem and Mavis Staples. Around this time, she became a member of the Black Rock Coalition, founded by Vernon Reid of Living Colour.

Hendryx took a detour from commercial music with Skin Diver, a new age record produced with long-time Tangerine Dream member Peter Baumann. The album generally was greeted with positive feedback from critics, but was commercially unsuccessful. The title track did attract some attention, as did "Women Who Fly", which later was covered by Jefferson Starship.

In addition to the duet-album You Have to Cry Sometime with Billy Vera in 1992 and a couple of compilation-only tracks, Hendryx has recorded more than five albums worth of music, but she has been unable to release any of it due to lack of interest from major and independent record labels. Her Epic, RCA and EMI albums have been out of print and only recently attracted the attention of specialist reissue labels, but a greatest hits album titled Transformation was released in 1999 by Razor & Tie. Her 1977 debut solo album was issued for the first time on CD by the T-Bird imprint of the UK reissue label Cherry Red in the fall of 2010. UK R&B reissue label Funky Town Grooves released The Heat on CD in late 2011, which included three bonus tracks. Funky Town Grooves announced plans to release both Nona and The Art of Defense in early 2012. Each CD is to include seven bonus tracks.

Hendryx also dabbled in acting. She wrote and performed the theme for Landlord Blues (1987), while also having a small part in the film as attorney Sally Viscuso. She played herself in the late-1990s Pam Grier series Linc's, and at the end of the show, accompanied herself on the piano for "Lift Every Voice". Most recently, she appeared in the third season of The L Word, which closed with Grier, Hendryx, and the trio BETTY singing a cover of the Hendryx track "Transformation".

Hendryx has been involved in many musical collaborations, both for her vocals and her songwriting. One of her early collaborations was with Jerry Harrison's (Talking Heads) The Red and the Black album in 1981. In 1992, she recorded a duet with Billy Crawford, "Urgently in Love". In 1998, she performed in the video of the rap hit "It's a Party" with Bounty Killer. She has written songs for Dusty Springfield and Ultra Nate. She has produced albums for Lisa Lisa and the Bush Tetras. Other artists with whom she has recorded with over the years include David Johansen, Yoko Ono, Cameo, Talking Heads (3 albums: Remain in Light, The Name of This Band Is Talking Heads and Speaking in Tongues), Garland Jeffreys, Dan Hartman, Afrika Bambaata (performing a duet of "Giving Him Something He Can Feel" with Boy George), Rough Trade, Curtis Hairston, and Graham Parker on "Soul Christmas".

In the beginning of the current decade, Hendryx was asked to appear on two of Paul Haslinger's albums. She sang lead vocals for two tracks "Higher Purpose" and "Beginning to End", featured on the soundtrack for the Showtime series Sleeper Cell.

=== Later career and Labelle reunions ===
Hendryx still tours and has written music for the theatre, songs for the play with music Blue. Sandra St. Victor (The Family Stand) recruited daughters of famous African American soul/blues icons – including Lalah Hathaway, Simone, Indira Khan, and Leah McCrae – together with "spiritual daughters" Joyce Kennedy, Caron Wheeler, and Nona, to form the group Daughters of Soul, which has enjoyed much success, especially on the European tour circuit.

Hendryx formed Rhythmbank, her own record label with Bob Banks, in 2005. They signed and released several EPs and albums, the Showtime series Sleeper Cell, and a gospel album by protégé Najiyah Threatt.

Since the breakup of Labelle, Patti, Sarah, and Nona have reunited on occasion. These reunions include Patti LaBelle's "Live in New York" video, the dance hit "Turn It Out" from the soundtrack To Wong Foo, Thanks for Everything! Julie Newmar (1995), and two television specials. In January 2006, Labelle again reunited to record "Dear Rosa", a tribute to civil rights leader Rosa Parks. Labelle also performed the theme song for the soundtrack for the film Preaching to the Choir, with Nona being the composer of the film's soundtrack. In late 2008, Labelle released their comeback album Back to Now, and went on a successful concert tour that carried through the spring of 2009.

Speaking in April 2009 to noted UK soul/R&B writer Pete Lewis of the award-winning Blues & Soul, Hendryx discussed the background to Labelle reuniting for Back to Now: "Well, there were lots of ongoing times when we'd discussed doing it. And a lot of it was really down to the fact that the fans were DEMANDING that we did it! But, rather than just going back and doing what we'd done in the past, we did want to be able to make an album of new music before coming back out together. And it was really once we'd recorded the song 'Dear Rosa', together that Patti finally became convinced that yes, we should make a new record and then go out and tour behind it. So I'd say basically our reunion was down to two things – pressure from the fans; plus Patti hearing a sound again that she loved and hadn't heard for many years."

Hendryx has written a children's book titled The Brownies.

On May 27, 2010, Hendryx performed selections from Skindiver, a sci-fi musical she is co-writing with Charles Randolph-Wright. The surprise show was at Busboys and Poets in Washington DC and sponsored by Arena Stage. Hendryx & Wright presented two late-night staged readings of Skindiver at Arena Stage in 2011.

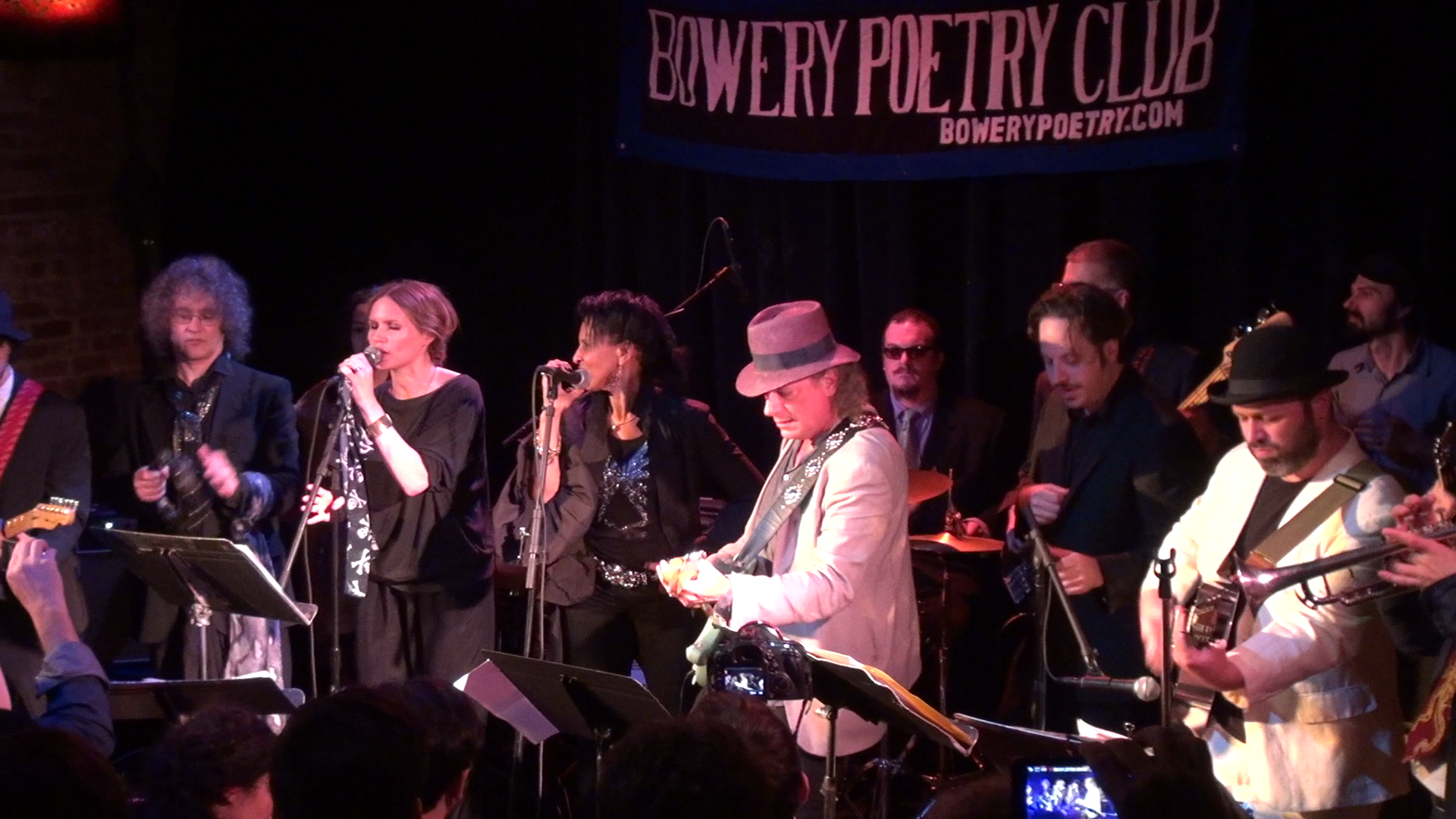
Hendryx with Gary Lucas, Nina Persson and others at the Best Batch Yet tribute to Captain Beefheart

In September 2012, Hendryx's digital-only album, Mutatis Mutandis, received a CD release. To promote the album, Hendryx appeared on the BBC's Later... with Jools Holland on 28 November 2012, where she performed two tracks, Let's Give Love A Try, and Temple Of Heaven (the latter only being available to watch online via BBC iPlayer). In February 2013, she appeared as a special guest as part of The World of Captain Beefheart, a tribute concert arranged by Dutch radio presenter, Co de Kloet, and featuring Gary Lucas with the 60 piece Metropole Orchestra.

Hendryx released several singles in 2016, including a collaboration with American DJ and production duo, Soul Clap, which resulted in the single, Shine (This Is It). Shine (This Is It) was included on Soul Clap's self-titled album in October 2016, and an EP featuring different remixes of the track was released the following year. Hendryx also collaborated with guitarist, Gary Lucas, that same year, which resulted in the album, The World of Captain Beefheart, a collection of cover versions of songs by avant-garde artist Captain Beefheart.

In February 2018, Hendryx released an EP, Keep Funkin, which was produced by Soul Clap, and featured contributions from Nile Rogers and Jason Miles. Hendryx also contributed vocals to another track, "Peel Back", produced by FSQ, which was included as a bonus track on digital versions of the Keep Funkin EP (as well as FSQ's own album in 2020).

During the 2025 to 2026 academic year Hendryx has served as the Roth Visiting Artist at Dartmouth College's Hopkins Center for the Arts. On June 30, 2026, Hendryx performed a concert tribute to Labelle in Spaludling Auditorium on the Dartmouth College campus in Hanover, NH.

== Personal life and activism ==
Hendryx has lived on the Upper West Side of Manhattan in New York City since the early 1970s. In 2007, she discussed her bisexuality in an interview with The Advocate magazine and in 2011 married her long-term partner, English talent manager Vicki Wickham. Wickham died on 31 July, 2026 from Lewy's body disease, aged 87.

Hendryx is a gay-rights activist; in summer 2008, she joined Cyndi Lauper on her True Colors Tour, raising awareness of discrimination and the LGBT community.

== Discography ==
=== Albums ===
- Nona Hendryx (1977)
- Nona (1983)
- The Art of Defense (1984)
- The Heat (1985)
- Female Trouble (1987)
- Skindiver (1989)
- Mutatis Mutandis (2012)

== Filmography ==
=== Film ===
- Sgt. Pepper's Lonely Hearts Club Band, 1978, Cameo in finale, (MCA film)
- Heartbreakers, 1984 (song "Transformation")
- Landlord Blues, 1987, composer (musical score), vocalist (title track), acting (as attorney "Sally Viscuso")
- Gospa, (Composer) 1995, (MCA film)
- Preaching to the Choir, a.k.a. On the One, 2006, (Composer)

=== Television ===
- People: A Musical Celebration, (composer), 1996
- The L Word, season 3 episode 8 (as herself), 2006

=== Theater ===
- Blue, (Composer), 2001
- The Who's Tommy ("The Acid Queen"), 2008, Ricardo Montalbán Theatre

=== Radio ===
- Playback '78, (interview) 1978, (radio)
- Interchords, (interview) 1978, (radio)
