= Main Offender =

Studio album by Keith Richards
- Released: 19 October 1992
- Recorded: 18 March – 6 September 1992
- Studio: Master Sound Astoria (Astoria, New York); The Hit Factory (New York City); The Site (San Rafael, California)
- Genre: Rock & roll; hard rock; boogie rock; funk rock; reggae
- Length: 49:53
- Label: Virgin
- Producer: Keith Richards; Steve Jordan; Waddy Wachtel

Keith Richards chronology
Live at the Hollywood Palladium, December 15, 1988 (1991)	Main Offender (1992)	Vintage Vinos (2010)

Main Offender is the second studio album by Keith Richards, released in 1992 between the Rolling Stones' Steel Wheels and Voodoo Lounge projects.

Richards teamed with Talk Is Cheap collaborator Steve Jordan and added Waddy Wachtel to the mix both in composing and producing Main Offender. Sessions with Richards' group of musician friends known as "The X-Pensive Winos" took place in California and New York City from March to September 1992, with touring in Argentina and Europe in late 1992 and North America in early 1993.

Main Offender was released in October 1992 to generally positive reviews. However, it failed to match the commercial success of Talk Is Cheap, reaching No. 45 in the UK and No. 99 in the US. After the Main Offender tour, Richards returned to recording exclusively with the Rolling Stones and did not release another solo album until Crosseyed Heart in 2015. In 2022 the album was reissued to mark its 30th anniversary. The reissue featured the previously unreleased concert album Winos Live in London '92.

Professional ratings
Review scores
Source	Rating
AllMusic	3/5 stars
Chicago Tribune	3/4 stars
Entertainment Weekly	B+
Orlando Sentinel	4/5 stars

== Track listing ==
1. "999" (Keith Richards, Steve Jordan, Waddy Wachtel) – 5:50
2. "Wicked as It Seems" (Richards, Jordan, Charley Drayton) – 4:45
3. "Eileen" (Richards, Jordan) – 4:29
4. "Words of Wonder" (Richards, Jordan, Wachtel) – 6:35
5. "Yap Yap" (Richards, Jordan, Wachtel) – 4:43
6. "Bodytalks" (Richards, Jordan, Drayton, Sarah Dash) – 5:20
7. "Hate It When You Leave" (Richards, Jordan, Wachtel) – 4:59
8. "Runnin' Too Deep" (Richards, Jordan) – 3:20
9. "Will but You Won't" (Richards, Jordan) – 5:05
10. "Demon" (Richards, Jordan) – 4:45
11. "Key to the Highway" (Charlie Segar, Big Bill Broonzy) – 3:21 (Japanese issue bonus track)

=== Winos Live in London '92 ===
Released as part of the 30th Anniversary reissue.

1. "Take It So Hard" (Richards, Jordan) – 4:15
2. "999" (Richards, Jordan, Wachtel) – 6:45
3. "Wicked As It Seems" (Richards, Jordan, Drayton) – 5:14
4. "How I Wish" (Richards, Jordan) – 4:31
5. "Gimme Shelter" (Mick Jagger, Richards) – 6:10
6. "Hate It When You Leave" (Richards, Jordan, Wachtel) – 6:39
7. "Before They Make Me Run" (Jagger, Richards) – 3:31
8. "Eileen" (Richards, Jordan) – 5:42
9. "Will But You Won't" (Richards, Jordan) – 7:30
10. "Bodytalks" (Richards, Jordan, Drayton, Dash) – 6:53
11. "Happy" (Jagger, Richards) – 8:28
12. "Whip It Up" (Richards, Jordan) – 8:33

== Personnel ==
- Keith Richards – lead vocals, backing vocals (1–3, 5–10), guitars, rattlesnake sounds (2), bass (3–5), percussion (5, 9), keyboards (7), acoustic piano (8)
- Ivan Neville – organ (1, 4), clavinet (1, 2, 4, 9), acoustic piano (4, 8, 10), vibraphone (5), voice (6), bass (7), harpsichord (8)
- Waddy Wachtel – guitars, backing vocals (1–4, 6–10), acoustic piano (3), celesta (7), percussion (9)
- Charley Drayton – bass (1, 2, 6, 8, 10), backing vocals (3, 7), drums (4), baritone guitar (5), acoustic piano (7), Hammond B3 organ (7)
- Steve Jordan – drums (1–3, 5–10), backing vocals, percussion (2, 4–6, 8–10), guitars (4), castanets (3), Farfisa organ (7), congas (7)
- Jack Bashkow – woodwinds (7)
- Crispin Cioe – woodwinds (7)
- Arno Hecht – woodwinds (7)
- Sarah Dash – backing vocals (1, 6)
- Bernard Fowler – backing vocals (2, 4–10)
- Babi Floyd – backing vocals (2, 4–8, 10), vocals (9)

=== Production ===
- Steve Jordan – producer
- Keith Richards – producer
- Waddy Wachtel – producer
- Joe Blaney – recording, mixing (4)
- Don Smith – recording, mixing (3, 8)
- Niko Bolas – mixing (1, 2, 4–7, 9, 10)
- Ron Allaire – assistant engineer
- Tom Fritze – assistant engineer
- Carl Glanville – assistant engineer
- Andrew Grassi – assistant engineer
- Tim Hatfield – assistant engineer, additional engineer
- David Merrill – assistant engineer
- Steve Neat – assistant engineer
- Julio Pena – assistant engineer
- Kevin Scott – assistant engineer
- Richard Scott – assistant engineer
- Ted Jensen – mastering at Sterling Sound (New York, NY)
- Robyn Lipp – recording coordinator
- Linda Smith – recording coordinator
- Tony Russell – production coordinator
- Mick Haggerty – art direction
- Dewey Nicks – black and white photography
- David LaChapelle – color photography

== Charts ==
Chart performance for Main Offender
Chart (1992)	Peak position
Australian Albums (ARIA)	96
Dutch Albums (Album Top 100)	67
German Albums (Offizielle Top 100)	60
Swedish Albums (Sverigetopplistan)	43
UK Albums (OCC)	45
US Billboard 200	99

Chart (2022)	Peak position
Austrian Albums (Ö3 Austria)	22
Belgian Albums (Ultratop Flanders)	58
Belgian Albums (Ultratop Wallonia)	152
Dutch Albums (Album Top 100)	55
German Albums (Offizielle Top 100)	4
Scottish Albums (OCC)	15
Swiss Albums (Schweizer Hitparade)	13
UK Independent Albums (OCC)	8
