= Talk Is Cheap =

Studio album by Keith Richards
- Released: 3 October 1988
- Recorded: August 1987 – May 1988
- Studio: Air, Montserrat; Le Studio, Morin-Heights, Quebec: The Hit Factory (New York City)
- Genre: Rock & roll; hard rock; roots rock; funk rock
- Length: 47:01
- Label: Virgin
- Producer: Keith Richards; Steve Jordan

Keith Richards chronology
Talk Is Cheap (1988)	Live at the Hollywood Palladium, December 15, 1988 (1991)

Talk Is Cheap is the debut solo album by English musician Keith Richards, the guitarist of the Rolling Stones, released in 1988. Recorded and released during a long-standing falling out with Mick Jagger, Talk Is Cheap received positive reviews upon its release.

== Background ==
Relations between Jagger and Richards had grown tense during the 1980s as they began to disagree on the musical direction of the band; "You Don't Move Me" would be written about their feud. The image-conscious Jagger was keen to follow the trends and keep the Rolling Stones current, while Richards wanted to preserve their reputation and roots. When Jagger was more interested in pursuing his solo career instead of touring for Dirty Work in 1986, Richards began a solo project for the first time.

Richards teamed up with Steve Jordan, who had worked on Dirty Work and eventually became the Rolling Stones' touring drummer following Charlie Watts' death in 2021, and the pair wrote several new songs. One of which, "Almost Hear You Sigh", would be placed on the Rolling Stones' Steel Wheels in 1989 (with lyric modifications by Jagger). Recording began in August 1987 at Le Studio in Morin Heights, Quebec, and continued sporadically until the following May with visits to Montserrat and Bermuda. In order to assert his independence further, Richards signed with Virgin Records, while the Rolling Stones were under contract to Sony Music (they followed him to Virgin in 1993).

The core of the band, called the X-Pensive Winos, consisted of Waddy Wachtel, Ivan Neville, Charley Drayton and Jordan, with many guest artists taking part in the recording, including Sarah Dash, Bootsy Collins, Maceo Parker, the Memphis Horns and Patti Scialfa, and the only musician from the Stones to appear, guitarist Mick Taylor.

A live version of "Make No Mistake" performed at the Hollywood Palladium was later featured in an episode of The Sopranos and on the 2001 soundtrack album The Sopranos: Peppers & Eggs: Music from the HBO Original Series.

== Reception ==
Professional ratings
Review scores
Source	Rating
AllMusic	4.5/5 stars
Blender	4/5 stars
Chicago Tribune	4/4 stars
Los Angeles Times	3.5/4 stars
NME	3/10
Q	4/5 stars
Record Collector	4/5 stars
Rolling Stone	3.5/5 stars
Uncut	7/10
The Village Voice	B+

Released in October 1988, Talk Is Cheap was met with critical acclaim, with some reviews half-jokingly calling it the best Rolling Stones album in years. The Houston Chronicle noted that "if Richards can't sing and his songs are unexceptional, he co-opted those potential problems by providing these sessions with a looseness that borders on the feel of a demo tape, an ingenious antidote to the day's polished pop (why eight studios then?)." It peaked at No. 37 in the UK and No. 24 in the US, where it went gold. Reflecting on the record in 2022, Far Out wrote, "Sometimes the popular opinion is the right one: Talk Is Cheap is the best of the solo albums, and it ranks with much of the best work The Rolling Stones put to tape."

== Track listing ==
All tracks written by Keith Richards and Steve Jordan.

=== Standard edition ===
Side one

1. "Big Enough" – 3:17
2. "Take It So Hard" – 3:11
3. "Struggle" – 4:10
4. "I Could Have Stood You Up" – 3:12
5. "Make No Mistake" – 4:53
6. "You Don't Move Me" – 4:48

Side two

1. "How I Wish" – 3:32
2. "Rockawhile" – 4:38
3. "Whip It Up" – 4:01
4. "Locked Away" – 5:48
5. "It Means a Lot" – 5:22

=== 2019 reissue bonus tracks ===
1. "Blues Jam" (Keith Richards, Steve Jordan, Mick Taylor, Joey Spampinato, Johnnie Johnson, Chuck Leavell, Bobby Keys) – 4:39
2. "My Babe" (Willie Dixon) – 3:13
3. "Slim" (Richards, Jordan, Taylor, Spampinato, Johnson, Keys) – 10:18
4. "Big Town Playboy" (Little Johnny Jones) – 4:19
5. "Mark on Me" – 5:51
6. "Brute Force" – 4:00

The 2019 reissue features six previously unreleased tracks.

== Personnel ==
The X-Pensive Winos

- Keith Richards – lead vocals, guitar
- Steve Jordan – drums, percussion, bass on "Take It So Hard", backing vocals
- Sarah Dash – backing vocals, duet on "Make No Mistake"
- Charley Drayton – bass guitar, drums on "Take It So Hard", backing vocals
- Ivan Neville – piano, keyboards, backing vocals
- Bobby Keys – tenor saxophone on "I Could Have Stood You Up" and "Whip It Up"
- Waddy Wachtel – acoustic, electric, and slide guitar, production consultant, backing vocals

Additional musicians

- Bootsy Collins – bass guitar on "Big Enough"
- Michael Doucet – violin on "Locked Away"
- Stanley "Buckwheat" Dural – accordion on "You Don't Move Me", "Rockawhile" and "Locked Away"
- Johnnie Johnson – piano on "I Could Have Stood You Up"
- Chuck Leavell – organ on "I Could Have Stood You Up"
- Maceo Parker – alto saxophone on "Big Enough"
- Joey Spampinato – bass guitar on "I Could Have Stood You Up" and "Rockawhile"
- Mick Taylor – guitar on "I Could Have Stood You Up"
- Bernie Worrell – organ on "Big Enough" and "You Don't Move Me", clavinet on "Make No Mistake" and "Rockawhile"
- The Memphis Horns (Jimmi Kinnard, Andrew Love, Ben Cauley, Gary Topper, Jack Hale, James Mitchell) – horns on "Make No Mistake"
- Patti Scialfa – backing vocals
- Willie Mitchell – horn arrangements

Production

- Keith Richards – producer
- Steve Jordan – producer
- Robert Berry – engineer, assistant engineer
- Joe Blaney – engineer
- David Dorn – engineer, assistant engineer
- Richard Ealey – engineer, assistant engineer
- Richard Moakes - engineer, assistant engineer
- Joe Ferla – engineer
- David Kennedy – engineer
- Paul Milner – engineer, assistant engineer
- Julio Pena – engineer, assistant engineer
- Don Smith – engineer, mixing
- Roger Talkov – engineer, assistant engineer
- Joe Blaney – mixing
- Greg Calbi – mastering
- Sante D'Orazio - cover photography

== Charts ==
=== Weekly charts ===
Year	Chart	Position
1988	UK Albums Chart	37
1988	Australian (ARIA Charts)	15
1988	US Billboard 200	24
1989	US Billboard 200	54
2019	Polish Albums (ZPAV)	44
2019	UK Albums Chart	43

== Certifications ==
Certifications for Talk Is Cheap
Region	Certification	Certified units/sales
Canada (Music Canada)	Gold	50,000^{^}
United States (RIAA)	Gold	500,000^{^}
^{^} Shipments figures based on certification alone.
