= Ivan Neville =

American R&B musician and singer

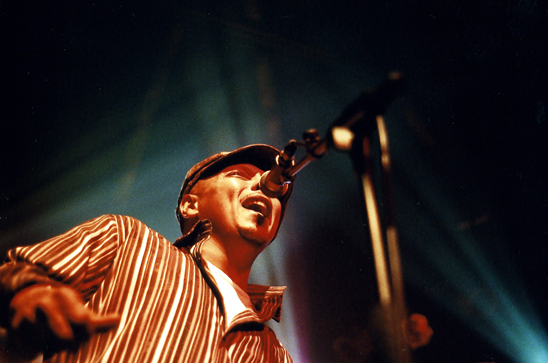
- Neville performing at the 2005 Bourbon Street Fest

Background information
- Born: August 19, 1959 (age 67); New Orleans, Louisiana, U.S.
- Genres: R&B, new wave, house
- Occupation: Musician
- Instruments: Vocals; keyboards
- Years active: 1983–present
- Labels: Polydor; Iguana Records; Uptop Entertainment; Compendia Records

Ivan Neville (born August 19, 1959) is an American multi-instrumentalist musician, singer, and songwriter. He is the son of Aaron Neville and nephew to the other members of The Neville Brothers.

== Career ==
Neville has released four solo albums and had a Top 30 Billboard hit with the first single "Not Just Another Girl" from his debut solo album If My Ancestors Could See Me Now. "Not Just Another Girl" reached 26 on the Billboard charts. His second single "Falling Out of Love" was a duet with singer Bonnie Raitt that reached 91 on the Billboard charts. The song was also featured in the 1989 comedy Skin Deep, starring John Ritter.

Neville's recording of "Why Can't I Fall in Love" was featured on the 1990 soundtrack to the Allan Moyle film, Pump Up the Volume.

Neville and his band, Dumpstaphunk, self-released a full-length studio debut, Everybody Want Sum, during the summer of 2010.

Neville has played with and appeared on several Neville Brother records, as well as his father’s solo records. He performed in Bonnie Raitt's band from 1985 to 1987 and contributed the song "All Day, All Night", co-written with bassist James Hutchison to her Nine Lives album. He also contributed keyboards to two Rolling Stones albums, 1986’s Dirty Work and 1994’s Voodoo Lounge as well as being a member of Keith Richards’ solo band the X-Pensive Winos. In 1988, 1992 and 1993 he toured with Richards after recording Talk is Cheap and Main Offender, and was the opening act for the shows, since If My Ancestors Could See Me Now was released.

Neville released his second solo album entitled Thanks in 1994.

Apart from appearing on several other artists’ records, including Don Henley, Bonnie Raitt, Robbie Robertson, Rufus, Paula Abdul, and Delbert McClinton, he was a member of the Spin Doctors, touring and recording on the group's album Here Comes the Bride in 1999–2000, including assuming lead vocal duties when Chris Barron lost his voice.

In 2003, he formed his own band Dumpstaphunk and appeared, among other places, on the Late Show with David Letterman.

When the levees failed in New Orleans in 2005, Neville joined The New Orleans Social Club and recorded the benefit album Sing Me Back Home with producers Leo Sacks and Ray Bardani at Wire Studios in Austin, Texas. Neville's searing version of John Fogerty's "Fortunate Son" was critically acclaimed. "Catharsis never sounded cooler," raved Entertainment Weekly. In 2007, with Dumpstaphunk and B.B. King, he participated in a tribute album to fellow New Orleans musician Fats Domino, contributing his version of the title song to Goin' Home: A Tribute to Fats Domino (Vanguard Records).

Neville appears in performance footage in the 2005 documentary film Make It Funky!, which presents a history of New Orleans music and its influence on rhythm and blues, rock and roll, funk and jazz. In the film, he performs on "Rip It Up" as guest vocalist with Earl Palmer and the house band, and on "Fire on the Bayou" with The Neville Brothers.

Through the Tipitina's Foundation, along with other New Orleans musicians, Neville has been active in performing benefit shows in support of Hurricane Katrina charities. Ivan Neville's band includes Nick Daniels and Tony Hall, both on bass (with Hall sometimes on guitar); Ian Neville (Ivan's cousin) playing guitar, and Raymond Weber on drums.

In March 2024, Neville was featured on vocals, organ, and clavinet on "Higher Education", the title single of the Naya Rockers' benefit album supporting the Alpha School of Music in Kingston, Jamaica, alongside guitarist Andy Bassford, bassist Nate Edgar, keyboardist Cameron Greenlee, and drummer Nathan Sabanayagam.

== Awards and honors ==
=== OffBeat's Best of The Beat Awards ===
Year	Category	Work nominated	Result	Ref.
2004	Song of the Year	"Brothers" (with Aaron, Art, Charles, and Cyril Neville, and Milton Davis)	Won	
2006	Best R&B/Funk Band or Performer (with Dumpstaphunk)		Won	
2009	Best R&B/Funk Band or Performer (with Dumpstaphunk)		Won	
2011	Best Piano/Keyboard		Won	
2013	Best Piano/Keyboard		Won	
2014	Best Piano/Keyboard		Won	
2023	Best Piano/Keyboard		Won	

== Solo discography ==
- If My Ancestors Could See Me Now (1988)
- Thanks (1994)
- Saturday Morning Music (2002)
- Scrape (2004)
- Touch My Soul (2023)
