= Neal H Pogue =

American record producer, engineer

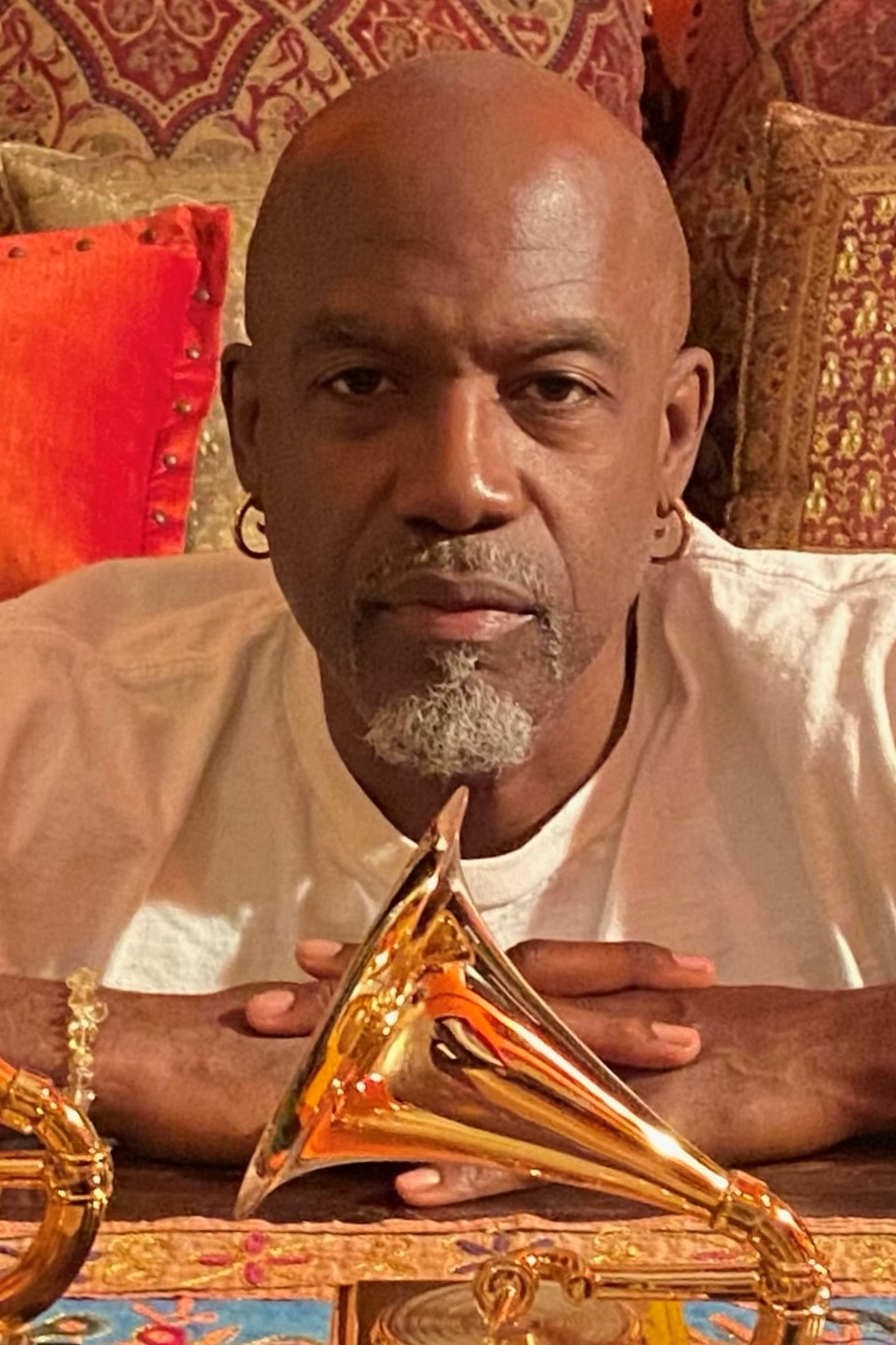
- Born: December 27, 1963 (age 62); Roselle, New Jersey, U.S.
- Occupations: Mixing engineer; record producer
- Years active: 1984–present

Neal H Pogue (born December 27, 1963) is an American producer, audio engineer and mixer originally from Roselle, New Jersey, and based in Los Angeles. Pogue is a multi-time Grammy Award winner, having first won for his engineering and mixing work on Outkast's Speakerboxxx/The Love Below (2004) – which won the Album of the Year category, and his audio mixing work on Tyler, the Creator's Igor and Call Me If You Get Lost – which both records won the Best Rap Album category respectively in 2020 & 2022. Pogue has also produced for artists such as M.I.A, Nelly Furtado, Earth, Wind & Fire and has mixed for artists such as TLC, Pink, Nicki Minaj, Janelle Monáe, Tyler, the Creator, and Steve Lacy. Having engineered and mixed TLC's Grammy nominated 11-time platinum single "Waterfalls", Pogue also arranged the horns on "Waterfalls" under the pseudonym "Shock". Pogue has gone on to work with many prominent names in music.

== Life and career ==
Pogue was born on December 27, 1963, in Roselle, New Jersey, the son of social worker Joan Ford and artist Arthur Pogue. At a young age, his interest in music started with the drums, when his mom gave him his first drum set. In 1984, he took his dreams of becoming a tour drummer to Los Angeles, California in 1984. After numerous attempts of breaking into the industry as a musician, Pogue enrolled at Sound Master Recording, a local school for audio engineering. By experimenting with instruments by recording them on a four-track recorder, he began to appreciate the craft of engineering. After school through a mutual friend, Pogue interned at a studio owned by Michael Jackson's younger brother Randy Jackson. He was then awarded with the opportunity to be an assistant engineer on Jackson's Randy & The Gypsys album. Pogue assisted there for a year. During Pogue's internship, he met Larrabee Sound Studios owner Kevin Mills and interned under him for 1 year due to Mills' encouragement that Pogue should go out on his own. In 1990, while doing various recording and mixing gigs in LA, he came in contact with Bobby Brown through Louil Silas Jr., who was an MCA Records Executive A&R at the time. Brown, who was living in Atlanta at the time, suggested that Pogue work there with him on his self-titled album. While working in Atlanta, Pogue fell in love with the city and decided to move him and his family there in 1992. While in Atlanta, through recording artist Pebbles, Pogue met the newly formed production company Organized Noize whom at the time had the LaFace Records bound unsigned hip hop duo Outkast. Through his relationship with LaFace he came in contact and worked with Toni Braxton, Goodie Mob, TLC, and Outkast, who he would go on to engineer multiple successful albums for. Pogue went on to start his own production company, Fulton Yard Unlimited, with partner Walter McKennie, with whom he has worked with M.I.A., Nelly Furtado, En Vogue, and Earth Wind & Fire.

Pogue currently resides in Los Angeles where he has continued a prolific mixing career including working on albums for R&B/hip hop duo THEY., Swedish artist Robyn's #1 charted album Honey, "Tonya" for Brockhampton's Iridescence, and Macy Gray for whom he mixed her album Ruby.

== Career highlights ==
=== Working with Outkast ===
In 1993, Pogue began working on Outkast's initial effort Southernplayalisticadillacmuzik. After Outkast's initial effort released in 1994, Pogue mixed two songs from TLC's 1995 album Crazy Sexy Cool, one being the smash hit "Waterfalls" which followed by Pogue mixing the hit single "Elevators" on Outkast's second studio album ATLiens in 1996, then mixing Aquemini in 1998. In 2000, Pogue mixed hit singles "Ms. Jackson" and "B.O.B" from the album Stankonia. In 2002, Andre 3000 came to Pogue with new music for what was soon to be Outkast's Grammy Award-winning album Speakerboxxx/The Love Below, Andre played Pogue a demo version of "Hey Ya". Pogue convinced Andre 3000 to choose "Hey Ya" as Speakerboxxx/The Love Below's lead single. The genre-bending song went on to become one of the most iconic songs of the 2000s appearing on multiple charts including Billboard's Adult Top 40, US Alternative Songs Chart, and Hot 100 where it sat at #1 for nine weeks. While working in collaboration with Outkast, Pogue mixed tracks such as "She Lives in My Lap", "She's Alive", "Prototype", "Take Off Your Cool" featuring Grammy Award-winner Norah Jones, "Spread" and "Vibrate".

=== Working with Earth, Wind & Fire ===
In 2012, Pogue worked on the production, mixing, instrumentation and composing of Earth, Wind & Fire's 20th studio album Now, Then & Forever that was released on September 13, 2013. Pogue co-wrote on the song "Sign On". Pogue sent a track to Academy Award-nominated and Grammy-winning songwriter Siedah Garrett, which would become the lead single "My Promise". Pogue recorded the demo with Garrett, then sent it to Earth, Wind & Fire. The album charted as number 11 on the US Billboard 200, and charted as number 6 on the US Top R&B/Hip-Hop Albums.

== Discography ==
=== 1990s ===
- 1994: Outkast - Southernplayalisticadillacmuzik
- 1994: TLC - CrazySexyCool
- 1995: Goodie Mob - Soul Food
- 1995: Society Of Soul - Brainchild
- 1996: Outkast - ATLiens
- 1996: Tony Rich Project - Words
- 1997: Soul Food (Soundtrack)
- 1998: Outkast - Aquemini
- 1998: Goodie Mob - Still Standing
- 1999: Goodie Mob - World Party

=== 2000s ===
- 2000: Ying Yang Twins - Thug Walkin'
- 2000: Pink - Can't Take Me Home
- 2000: Lucy Pearl - Lucy Pearl
- 2000: Outkast - Stankonia
- 2001: The Fast and the Furious: Original Motion Picture Soundtrack
- 2001: Yolanda Adams - Believe
- 2001: The Isley Brothers - Eternal
- 2002: Talib Kweli - Quality
- 2002: Citizen Cope – Citizen Cope
- 2003: Brian McKnight - U-Turn
- 2003: Queen Latifah - Persona
- 2003: Outkast - Speakerboxxx/The Love Below
- 2005: Transplants – Haunted Cities
- 2005: Stevie Wonder – A Time to Love
- 2005: Earth, Wind & Fire – Illumination
- 2006: Donavon Frankenreiter – Move by Yourself
- 2006: Nelly Furtado – Loose
- 2006: Outkast - Idlewild
- 2007: Talib Kweli - Eardrum
- 2007: Pharoahe Monch - Desire
- 2008: Kerli - Love Is Dead
- 2008: Busta Rhymes - Back on My B.S.
- 2008: Sean Garrett - Turbo 919
- 2008: Metronomy - Nights Out
- 2008: Solange - Sol-Angel and the Hadley Street Dreams
- 2008: Robin Thicke - Something Else
- 2008: Snoop Dogg - Ego Trippin'
- 2008: Gym Class Heroes - The Quilt
- 2008: The Game - LAX
- 2008: N.E.R.D. – Seeing Sounds
- 2008: Common – Universal Mind Control
- 2009: Franz Ferdinand – Tonight: Franz Ferdinand
- 2009: La Roux - La Roux
- 2009: Young Money – We Are Young Money

=== 2010s ===
- 2010: Bow Wow ft. Chris Brown - "Ain't Thinkin' 'Bout You"
- 2010: Nicki Minaj - Pink Friday
- 2010: Lil Wayne - Rebirth
- 2011: Demi Lovato – Unbroken
- 2011: Lil Wayne - Tha Carter IV
- 2011: Awolnation - "Sail"
- 2012: T. Mills – Leaving Home
- 2013: Earth, Wind & Fire – "Guilding Lights"
- 2013: Zendaya - Zendaya
- 2013: LL Cool J - "Whaddup"
- 2013: Aloe Blacc - Wake Me Up
- 2013: Aloe Blacc - Lift Your Spirit
- 2013: Earth, Wind & Fire - Now, Then & Forever
- 2013: Janelle Monáe - The Electric Lady
- 2014: Aretha Franklin - Aretha Franklin Sings the Great Diva Classics
- 2015: Janelle Monae - Wondaland Presents: The Eephus
- 2015: Joywave - How Do You Feel Now
- 2016: DRAM - Big Baby DRAM
- 2016: King - We Are King
- 2016: Duckwrth - I'm Uugly
- 2016: Metronomy - Summer 08
- 2017: Busta Rhymes - "Blessed"
- 2017: Duckwrth - An Xtra Uugly Mixtape
- 2017: Tyler, the Creator - Flower Boy
- 2017: THEY. - Nu Religion: Hyena
- 2017: ZZ Ward - The Storm
- 2017: Busty and the Bass - Uncommon Good
- 2018: Buddy - Harlan & Alondra
- 2018: Brockhampton - Iridescence
- 2018: Leikeli47 - "Roll Call"
- 2018: Tyler, the Creator - Music Inspired by Illumination & Dr. Seuss' The Grinch
- 2018: Robyn - Honey
- 2018: Donna Missal - This Time
- 2018: Max Frost - "Good Morning"
- 2018: Macy Gray - Ruby
- 2018: Anderson .Paak - "Bubblin"
- 2018: Doja Cat - Amala
- 2018: Saint Jhn - Collection One
- 2018: The Grinch (soundtrack)
- 2018: THEY. - Fireside
- 2019: Duckwrth - The Falling Man
- 2019: Kaytranada - Bubba
- 2019: Scarypoolparty - Exit Form
- 2019: The Wreck Shit Club - "Beeper"
- 2019: Tyler, the Creator - Igor
- 2019: Doja Cat - Hot Pink
- 2019: Kemba - Gilda
- 2019: IDK - Is He Real?
- 2019: Cherokee - Just a Brooklyn Girl

=== 2020s ===
- 2020: Ryan Beatty - Dreaming of David
- 2020: L'Impératrice - "Fou"
- 2020: Haim - Women in Music Pt. III
- 2020: Busty and the Bass - Eddie
- 2020: Duckwrth - SuperGood
- 2020: Pharrell Williams feat. Jay-Z - "Entrepreneur"
- 2021: Bonzie - Reincarnation
- 2021: Awolnation - Megalithic Symphony (10th Anniversary Deluxe Edition)
- 2021: Octavio - Someday I'll Be Happy
- 2021: The Marias - Cinema
- 2021: Michaela Jaé Rodriguez - "Something to Say"
- 2021: Doja Cat - Planet Her
- 2021: Tyler, the Creator - Call Me If You Get Lost
- 2021: The Undefeated - Liberated Music for the Movement Vol. 3
- 2021: Space Jam: A New Legacy (soundtrack)
- 2021: Baby Jake - The Sun Wakes Up Earlier Now
- 2021: BlackStarKids - Puppies Forever
- 2022: Leikeli47 - Shape Up
- 2022: Steve Lacy - Gemini Rights
- 2023: Andy Shauf - Norm
- 2024: Tyler, the Creator - Chromakopia
- 2025: Foxwarren - 2
- 2025: Tyler, the Creator - Don't Tap the Glass

== Grammy Awards ==
Year	Category	Work	Result
2002	Record of the Year	"Ms. Jackson"	Nominated
2002	Album of the Year	Stankonia	Nominated
2004	Album of the Year	Speakerboxxx/The Love Below	Won
2004	Record of the Year	"Hey Ya!"	Nominated
2010	Best Rap Album	Universal Mind Control	Nominated
2015	Best R&B Album	Lift Your Spirit	Nominated
2018	Best Rap Album	Flower Boy	Nominated
2020	Best Rap Album	Igor	Won
2021	Best Dance/Electronic Album	BUBBA	Won
2021	Best Dance Recording	"10%"	Won
2022	Album of the Year	Planet Her	Nominated
2022	Best Rap Album	Call Me If You Get Lost	Won
2022	Best Engineered Album	Cinema	Nominated
2023	Record of the Year	"Bad Habit"	Nominated
2023	Song of the Year	"Bad Habit"	Nominated
2023	Best Pop Solo Performance	"Bad Habit"	Nominated
2023	Best Progressive R&B Album	Gemini Rights	Won
