= Birdseye =

Birdseye, Birds Eye or Bird's Eye may refer to:

== Art and media ==
- Birdseye (film), a 2002 film starring Fred Ward
- Birdseye (Tony Rich album), 1998 album by Tony Rich
- Bird's Eye (album), 2024 album by Ravyn Lenae
- Bird's-eye view, a view of an object from above, as though the observer were a bird
- From a Bird's Eye View, a 1971 United States sitcom about two airline stewardesses
- Birdseye, colloquialism for fermata, a symbol used in musical notation

== Places ==
- Birdseye, Indiana, United States
- Birdseye, Utah, United States
- Birdseye Highway, South Australia, named for Sylvia Birdseye

== Flora ==
=== Chili peppers ===
- Bird's eye chili, a cultivar of the species Capsicum annuum, commonly found in Southeast Asia
- Bird's eye, or Capsicum annuum var. glabriusculum, native to southern North America and northern South America
- African bird's eye chili, also known as piri piri, a cultivar of Capsicum frutescens
- Filipino bird's eye, another name for siling labuyo, a cultivar of Capsicum frutescens native to the Philippines

=== Other flora ===
- Bird's eye, or Bird's-eye Speedwell, another name for the plant Veronica chamaedrys

== Surname ==
- Clarence Birdseye (1886–1956), considered the founder of the modern frozen food industry, and the "Birds Eye" frozen food brand
- Sylvia Birdseye (1902–1962), first woman to hold a commercial bus driving licence in South Australia
- Tom Birdseye (born 1951), American children's author

== Other ==
- Birds Eye, a multinational frozen foods company
  - Captain Birdseye, also known as Captain Iglo, the advertising mascot for the Birds Eye frozen food brand in Europe
- Birdseye cloth, frequently used in diapers
- Birdseye maple, a pattern in certain kinds of timber
- Bird's eye maple (mineral property), an effect observed in mica and other crystals
- Birds Eye Peak, a mountain in Alaska
