= Tail Feather Peak =

Mountain in Alaska, United States

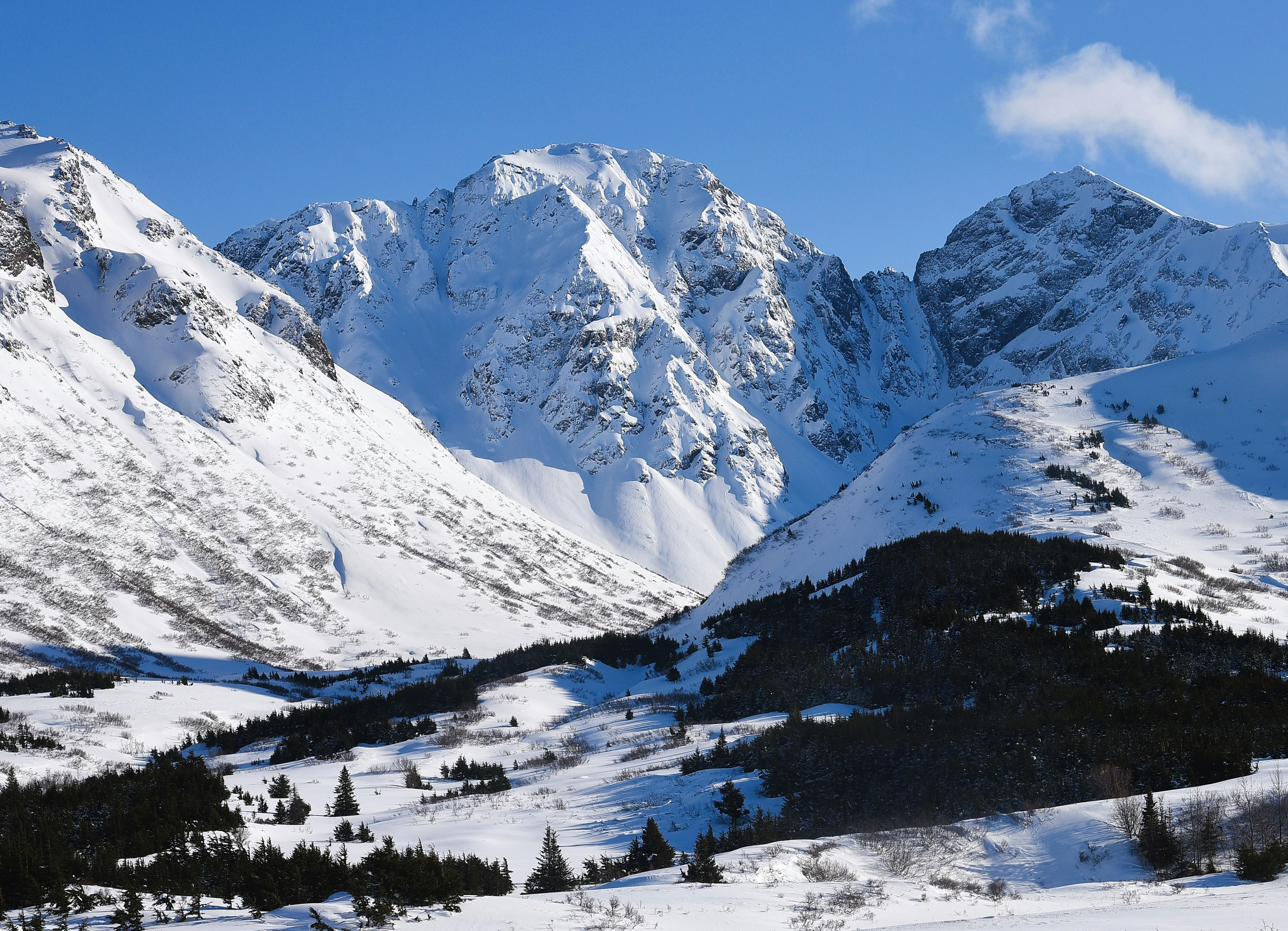
- West aspect, centered

Highest point
- Elevation: 4,960 ft (1,512 m)
- Prominence: 1,352 ft (412 m)
- Parent peak: Birds Eye Peak (4,970 ft)
- Isolation: 1.14 mi (1.83 km)
- Coordinates: 61°05′30″N 149°24′35″W

Geography
- Location within Alaska
- Location: Municipality of Anchorage
- Country: United States
- State: Alaska
- Protected area: Chugach State Park
- Parent range: Chugach Mountains
- Topo map: USGS Anchorage A-7

Tail Feather Peak is a 4,960-foot-elevation (1,512-meter) mountain summit in the U.S. state of Alaska. This mountain is located 14 miles (23 km) southeast of Anchorage in the Chugach Mountains and Chugach State Park. Precipitation runoff from the mountain drains into Ship Creek, thence Knik Arm. Topographic relief is significant as the summit rises 2,560 feet (780 m) in 0.75 mile (1.2 km) on the west slope. This mountain's toponym has not been officially adopted by the U.S. Board on Geographic Names.

== Climate ==
Based on the Köppen climate classification, Tail Feather Peak is located in a subarctic climate zone with long, cold, snowy winters, and cool summers. Weather systems coming off the Gulf of Alaska are forced upwards by the Chugach Mountains (orographic lift), causing heavy precipitation in the form of rainfall and snowfall. Winter temperatures can drop below −10 °F with wind chill factors below −20 °F. The months May through June offer the most favorable weather for climbing or viewing.

== See also ==
- List of mountain peaks of Alaska
- Geography of Alaska
