= My Promise (song) =

2013 song by Earth, Wind & Fire

Single by Earth, Wind & Fire

from the album Now, Then & Forever
- Released: 2013
- Genre: R&B
- Label: Sony Music/Legacy
- Songwriter(s): Austin Jacobs; Darrin Simpson; Siedah Garrett
- Producer(s): Neal Pogue, Walt B

Earth, Wind & Fire singles chronology
"Guiding Lights" (2012)	"My Promise" (2013)	"Something About You (Love The World)" (2013)

"My Promise" is a song by the band Earth, Wind & Fire, released as a single in 2013 by Sony Music/Legacy. The song reached No. 28 on the Billboard Adult R&B Songs chart and No. 30 on the Billboard Adult Contemporary Songs chart.

== Overview ==
"My Promise" was produced by Walt B. & Neal Pogue and composed by Austin Jacobs, Darrin Simpson with Siedah Garrett. The song came from Earth, Wind & Fire's 2013 album Now, Then & Forever.

== Critical reception ==
Emerys Baird of Blues & Soul said ""My Promise", the first single taken off this album, churns along sweetly with Nile Rodgers' like guitar - swinging, punchy horns and vocals to die for! (What else would you expect eh?) This is a pop vignette signalling the return of such masters, exemplifying the band's phenomenal control and musicianship to a tee!". Andy Kellman of Allmusic wrote "My Promise and Guiding Light especially rise high enough to be slotted between classics without losing listener interest." Harry Guerin of RTÉ exclaimed "It's now nearly 30 years (yikes) since Bailey's voice went higher than the helicopter in the video for Easy Lover with Phil Collins, but the man sounds as fresh and smooth as back in the day, dishing out the funk, soul and R&B mixed grill on songs like Sign On and The Promise to glorious effect."

== Credits ==
- Arranged By [Horns] – Benjamin Wright
- Arranged By [Horns], Synthesizer, Programmed By – Austin Jacobs
- Backing Vocals – Daniel McClain, Philip D. Bailey, Siedah Garrett
- Bass – Verdine White
- Drums – John Paris
- Grand Piano – Larry Dunn
- Guitar – Morris O'Connor
- Keyboards, Organ, Piano, Guitar, Programmed By – Darrin Simpson
- Lead Vocals – Philip J. Bailey
- Percussion – Neal Pogue
- Producer – Neal Pogue, Walt B
- Tenor Saxophone, Baritone Saxophone – Mark Visher
- Trombone – Duane Benjamin, Eric Jorgensen, Wendell Kelly
- Trumpet – James Ford, Jon Pappenbrook, Matthew Fronke
- Written-By – Austin Jacobs, Darrin Simpson, Siedah Garrett

== Charts ==
=== Weekly charts ===
2013–2014 chart performance for "My Promise"
Chart (2013–2014)	Peak position
Hungary (Rádiós Top 40)	35
Japan (Japan Hot 100) (Billboard)	42
US Adult R&B Songs (Billboard)	28
US Adult Contemporary (Billboard)	30
