= Wash & Set =

Studio album by Leikeli47
- Released: September 17, 2017
- Genre: Hip hop
- Length: 41:54
- Language: English
- Label: RCA

Leikeli47 chronology
Wash & Set (2017)	Acrylic (2018)

Wash & Set is the 2017 full-length studio album debut by American rapper Leikeli47. The first of three releases in her concept album trilogy based around beauty, it has received positive reviews from critics.

== Reception ==
Erin Lowers of Exclaim! rated Wash & Set an eight of 10 for Leikeli47 evincing an "ear for production and keen sense of melody power". A review for Vibe by Darryl Robertson calls this set "dynamic, and featureless, effort is loaded with creativity, vigor and the power of her own feminism". Critics reviewing Leikeli47's 2022 release Shape Up noted the potential in these songs, such as Anthony Fantano and Heather Phares of AllMusic Guide, with Heather Phares writing for the latter that this album has strong hooks and clever production. An Uproxx interview with the artist characterized this music as "unique and eclectic, and 100% Leikeli, and there’s nothing else like out today".

== Track listing ==
1. "2nd Fiddle" – 3:08
2. "Miss Me" – 2:43
3. "Attitude" – 3:19
4. "Bags" – 3:17
5. "O.M.C." – 3:38
6. "Money" – 2:55
7. "M I L K" – 3:15
8. "Don't Do It" – 2:33
9. "Bubblegum" – 2:31
10. "Look" – 2:07
11. "Ho" – 3:23
12. "Elian's Revenge" – 3:24
13. "Braids tuh'da Flo(w)" – 2:56
14. "Wash & Set" – 2:45

== See also ==
- List of 2017 albums
