= Shape up =

Shape up may refer to:

- Shape-up, a hair style
- Shape Ups, generically known as rocker bottom shoe
- Shape Up (album), a 2022 album by Leikeli47
- Shape Up (video game), a 2014 video game
- "Shape Up" (Full House), a 1990 episode of Full House
- "Shape-Up", a 1971 TV episode of Mission Impossible
- Shape Up with Nancy Larson, a show produced for WCPX-TV, hosted by Nancy Larson
- The Shape Up!, a 2009 mixtape by Lil Scrappy, see Lil Scrappy discography
- "Shape Up!", a 2010 song on Club 8's album The People's Record
- "Shape Up", a 2001 song by Randy's album The Human Atom Bombs

== See also ==
- Shaping Up, the title song on The Sherbs's 1982 album Shaping Up
- Shaping Up, a 1984 American sitcom
