= Guiding Lights (song) =

Single by Earth, Wind & Fire

from the album Now, Then & Forever
- Released: 2012
- Genre: R&B
- Length: 3:56
- Label: Sony Music/Legacy
- Songwriter(s): Philip D. Bailey; Austin Jacobs; Daniel McClain; Darrin Simpson
- Producer(s): Walt B. & Neal Pogue

Earth, Wind & Fire singles chronology
"Change Your Mind" (2006)	"Guiding Lights" (2012)	"My Promise" (2013)

"Guiding Lights" is a song by the band Earth, Wind & Fire, released as a single in 2012 by Sony Music/Legacy. The song reached No. 16 on the Billboard Smooth Jazz Songs chart and No. 30 on the Billboard Adult R&B Songs chart.

== Overview ==
"Guiding Lights" was produced by Walt B. & Neal Pogue and composed by Philip D. Bailey, Austin Jacobs, Daniel McClain with Darrin Simpson. The song came from Earth, Wind & Fire's 2013 album Now, Then & Forever.

== Critical reception ==
Andy Kellman of Allmusic wrote, "My Promise and Guiding Light especially rise high enough to be slotted between classics without losing listener interest." Elias Leight of Popmatters wrote that it was "a break-beat driven falsetto ballad that stretches the drama out past six minutes and includes a scream at the 4:18 mark that shouldn't be humanly possible for any man above the age of 30". Heo added, "The muted brass in "Guiding Lights" touches on the early '00s neo-soul that Earth, Wind & Fire helped inspire." Emerys Baird of Blues & Soul wrote, "Ballad time, with the sultry "Guiding Lights", all replete with possibly the highest note ever hit by a human (even higher that Janet Kay on Silly Games!). It's a towering performance with the waffliest of synth solos, which nobody seems to do anymore, EWF at their best!" Daryl Easlea of Record Collector described the song as a "big spiritual ballad".

== Personnel ==
- Lead and backing vocals – Philip J. Bailey
- Backing vocals – Daniel McClain, B. David Whitworth, Philip D. Bailey
- Alto saxophone, tenor saxophone – Gary Bias
- Bass guitar – Verdine White
- Drums – John Paris
- Electric piano (Rhodes) synthesizer (Moog Voyager) – Larry Dunn
- Guitar – Greg Moore, Morris O'Connor
- Percussion – David Leach
- Trombone – Reggie Young
- Trumpet – Gary Grant, Michael "Patches" Stewart
- Produced by Neal Pogue, Walt B
- Horns arranged by Jerry Hey

== Charts ==
Chart (2012)	Peak position
U.S. Billboard Smooth Jazz Songs	16
U.S. Billboard Adult R&B Songs	30
Japan (Japan Hot 100) (Billboard)	77
