= When You've Been Blessed (Feels Like Heaven) =

Single by Patti LaBelle

from the album Burnin'
- Released: March 31, 1992
- Genre: Gospel, R&B
- Length: 4:55
- Label: MCA Records
- Songwriters: Patti LaBelle; Nona Hendryx; James "Budd" Ellison; Nathanial Wilkie
- Producer: Ellison

Patti LaBelle singles chronology
"Somebody Loves You Baby (You Know Who It Is)" (1991)	"When You've Been Blessed (Feels Like Heaven)" (1992)	"When You Love Somebody (Saving My Love for You)" (1992)

Music video
- "When You've Been Blessed (Feels Like Heaven)" on YouTube

"When You've Been Blessed (Feels Like Heaven)" is a song by American singer Patti LaBelle. It was written by LaBelle, Nona Hendryx, Nathanial Wilkie, and James "Budd" Ellison for her 1991 album Burnin', while production was overseen by the latter. The song was released as the third single off the album in the spring of 1992.

== Critical reception ==
Ron Wynn from AllMusic said the song "had decent production touches and frenetic vocals" in his review of Burnin'. Cashbox wrote, "This single is a slow-paced track that has a real smooth sound to it. For the majority of the song, LaBelle holds back on those glass-shattering vocals that she's well known for. As a follow-up to her number one hit single, "Somebody Loves You", this one seems destined to follow along that same path. Beautiful song."

== Music video ==
The official music video was directed by Jane Simpson.

== Credits and personnel ==
Credits adapted from the liner notes of Gems.

- Patti LaBelle – vocals, writer
- Nona Hendryx – writer
- James R. "Budd" Ellison – producer, writer
- Nathanial Wilkie – associate producer, writer

== Charts ==
=== Weekly charts ===
Chart (1992)	Peak position
US Hot R&B/Hip-Hop Songs (Billboard)	4

=== Year-end charts ===
Chart (1992)	Position
US Hot R&B/Hip-Hop Songs (Billboard)	51
