= Just Call Me Stupid =

1993 novel by Tom Birdseye

- First edition
- Author: Tom Birdseye
- Language: English
- Genre: Children's novel
- Publisher: Holiday House
- Publication date: 1993
- Publication place: United States
- Media type: Print (Paperback)
- Pages: 181 pp
- ISBN: 0-14-037954-1
- OCLC: 34832675

Just Call Me Stupid is a children's novel by Tom Birdseye, published in 1993.

== Plot ==
Patrick is traumatized since his father would keep on calling him stupid and locking him in a closet. This led him to have troubles reading by fifth grade, leading his teachers and school bullies to also call him stupid. This is about to change thanks to a kind teacher, and the encounter of Celina, a neighbor and a classmate, whom he met once he was playing chess by himself in the park. Celine starts reading to Patrick and asks him to tell her a story that she secretly records, submits to a contest behind his back, and wins a trophy. Patrick gets furious, but this opens the path for Patrick to face his fear of being dumb and unlocks his pleasure for reading.
