= Busty and the Bass =

Canadian band

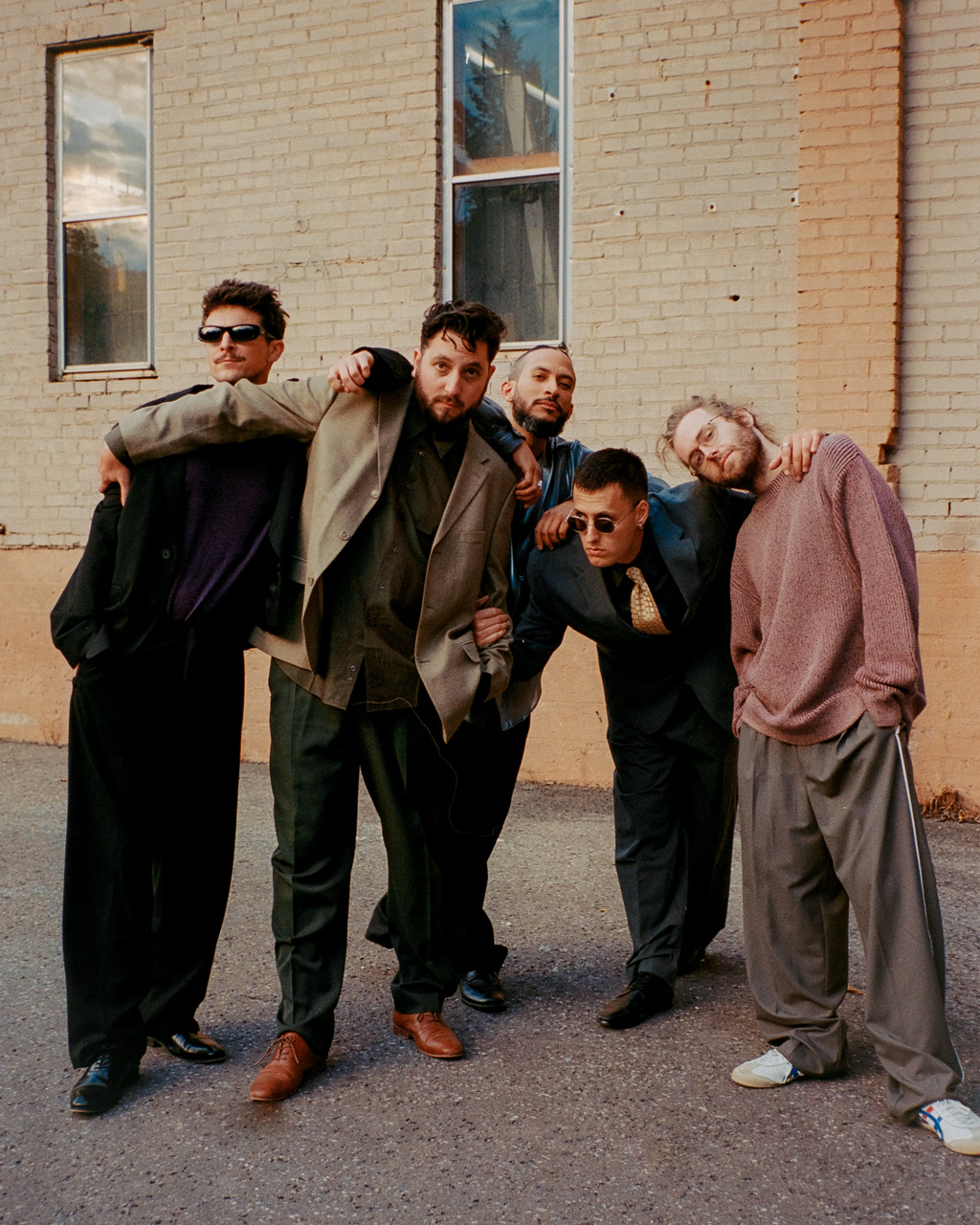
- Busty and the Bass in 2023

Background information
- Origin: Montreal, Quebec, Canada
- Genres: Soul; alternative R&B; indie soul; funk
- Years active: 2011–present
- Label: Arts & Crafts
- Members: Scott Bevins; Alistair Blu; Eric Haynes; Milo Johnson; Louis Stein; Julian Trivers; Chris Vincent; Jordan Brown
- Past members: Mike McCann; Nick Ferraro
- Website: bustyandthebass.com

Busty and the Bass is a music collective founded in Montréal, Canada. The group is known for its approach to a diverse range of musical genres, including soul, jazz, R&B, folk, funk, hip hop, and dance music, and for its signature incorporation of its horn section.

Having met while attending the Schulich School of Music at McGill University in 2011, Busty and the Bass has commercially released two EPs, GLAM (2015) and LIFT (2016), and three full-length albums, Uncommon Good (2017), Eddie (2020), and Forever Never Cares (2023). The band was previously signed to Montreal's Indica Records, and signed in 2020 to Toronto-based Arts and Crafts Productions. The group was nominated for Breakthrough Group of the Year at the 2024 Juno Awards.

The band has toured extensively across Canada, the United States, and Europe, and performed at festivals including Osheaga, Pinkpop, the Montreal International Jazz Festival, and Made in America.

== History ==
=== 2011–2014: Formation and early years ===
All original members of the band were students at McGill University's Schulich School of Music. The earliest iteration of the band formed for an informal jam session at a house party hosted on the shared patio of guitarist Stein's apartment a block away from the Mont-Royal Metro station. Originally, Busty and the Bass performed exclusively instrumental compositions and covers of popular songs, embracing horn melodies in the absence of a lead vocalist.

According to former vocalist Nick Ferraro, the band's name stuck after it came up during their first week of playing together. While the band once considered finding a more serious name, Ferraro says they enjoy the irony of a collective having a mystery front person, and the opportunity for all members of the band to be "Busty" at some point.

In the fall of 2014, Busty and the Bass launched a bid to compete for the title of Canada's Top University Band. The band's first-ever song with vocals, "Tryna Find Myself," was also their entry to the CBC competition. On 27 October 2014, CBC and TD Bank announced Busty and the Bass as the winners of the nationwide competition. Busty and the Bass was awarded a $10,000 prize and a concert at Montreal's Corona Theatre opening for Arkells.

=== 2015: GLAM EP ===
Following the band's success in the CBC competition, Busty and the Bass began work on their self-produced debut EP with Los Angeles-based recording engineer Jesse String. In June 2015, after signing to Montreal's Indica Records, the band released GLAM, an eight-track EP led by single "The Real".

=== 2016: LIFT EP ===
On 1 July 2016, Busty and the Bass released their second EP, LIFT, following the release of the single "Miss Judge". The six-track extended play was intended as a precursor to the band's debut album, and was made over the course of two months in the basement of an apartment on Saint Urbain Street shared by four band members, and at the studios of Indica Records on Saint Laurent Boulevard.

The release included a cover of Macy Gray's "I Try", an audience favourite that the band was known to play live. On 20 April 2016, Busty and the Bass posted a video of their "I Try" cover to YouTube, which was met with immediate acclaim. Music blog The Undiscovered wrote, "Taking on Macy Gray's smash hit, Busty and the Bass transform 'I Try' from a vocal-fueled r&b mega hit into a funky, horn-filled jam that will have you singing along and grooving with the beat". The video was later shared by Macy Gray on Twitter, who endorsed the band's rendition of her seminal hit, saying "beeyooteefoh! WATCH DIS!!".

In 2016, Busty and the Bass were announced in the lineups for the Osheaga Music and Arts Festival and the Quebec City Summer Festival. The band's performance supporting Half Moon Run at Paris' Fête de la Musique was also praised by Rolling Stone France, which called Busty and the Bass "one of our favourite discoveries this summer".

=== 2017: Uncommon Good ===
Busty and the Bass' debut album Uncommon Good was announced by the band on 30 June 2017, via a Facebook post addressed to their fans. The album, which took over a year and a half to make, was executive produced by hip hop producer and audio engineer Neal Pogue. Perhaps best known for his work with Atlanta-bred hip hop duo Outkast, for which he won a Grammy Award for Album of the Year, Pogue has also worked with other notable acts such as Snoop Dogg, Earth Wind and Fire, M.I.A., Nicki Minaj, Aretha Franklin, and Lil Wayne. Pogue travelled to Montreal on three occasions to work with Busty and the Bass after their manager shared the band's demos with Pogue's manager.

The album's ten tracks were developed through the band's collaborative composition process, through which a combination of 1-3 band members begin composing a song, bringing it to the rest of the group for input and experimentation later on. The majority of the record was recorded at the Indica Records studio, in the Plateau neighbourhood of Montreal.

On 19 January 2017, the band released the album's lead single, "Up Top," which was received favourably by fans and critics, with HuffPost remarking, "Discovering this kind of musical chemistry with such a large group in a short span of time is more than just luck—it's a calling". On 14 September 2017, Busty and the Bass released a dance video for the track, which was directed and choreographed by Kate Ramsden.

Uncommon Good's second single, "Memories and Melodies," was released on 5 April 2017. The album's third single, "Common Ground," was released on 30 June 2017, with a music video filmed during the band's spring European tour and directed by Greg McCahon released on 6 July 2017. The album's final single, "Closer," was released on 25 August 2017, and was included in Spotify Canada's New Music Friday playlist. The full album was released on 8 September 2017 at a sold-out show at the New York venue Mercury Lounge.

Busty and the Bass continued touring throughout 2017, including performances at Pinkpop, Made in America, SXSW, The Great Escape, Ottawa Bluesfest, and Rifflandia. On 8 July 2017, Busty and the Bass opened for Anderson .Paak at the Montreal International Jazz Festival for a crowd of over 80,000 people.

=== 2019–2020: Eddie ===
On 5 November 2019, Busty and the Bass returned with the single, "Clouds", which premiered on BBC Radio 1Xtra. The release also contained "Summer", a B-side track that later received a music video filmed in Montreal's St. James United Church.

In early 2020, Busty and the Bass signed to Arts & Crafts. The news, announced by the Canadian record label in a press release, was accompanied by a new song, "Baggy Eyed Dopeman". Featuring funk pioneer George Clinton of Parliament and Funkadelic, the song premiered on the Billboard magazine website.

On 14 August 2020, Busty and the Bass released their sophomore album, Eddie. The album is intended to explore the question: "What advice would you impart on that younger self? And if you could pass your younger self a mixtape, what would it sound like?"

In March 2022, it was announced through Busty's Instagram page that Nick Ferraro would be leaving the band to pursue personal interests.

=== 2021: ET Suite ===
On 17 March 2021, Busty and the Bass released ET Suite via Arts & Crafts, a 15-minute EP that reworks the track "ET" from their album Eddie, transforming it into four new, distinct and sonically diverse iterations. Recorded entirely in isolation during the COVID-19 pandemic, the EP features Verdine White of Earth, Wind & Fire, as well as afro-soul singer Pierre Kwenders, and a trio of artists from the band's Montreal community: Terrell Morris, Kallitechnis, and Tika the Creator.

=== 2022: Airplanes and Karneval EP ===
On 1 February 2022, Busty and the Bass shared a two-song single package, "Airplanes", featuring Polaris Music Prize winner Cadence Weapon, and B-Side "Caribou".

On 13 May 2022, the band released the Karneval EP, teaming up with Philly-by-way-of-Atlanta rapper STS, and vocalists Jordan Brown and Mel Pacifico. Complex described the EP as "soulful late-night hip-hop centred around the theme of an abandoned fairground, evoking memories of relationships, desire, and nostalgia."

On 17 November 2022, the band released the single "All The Things I Couldn't Say To You," a song about "finding the strength to tell the person you love how you feel."

=== 2023–present ===
On 15 February 2023, Busty and the Bass released the single "Far From Here" featuring Montreal's Magi Merlin. In March, the band completed a 4-night sold-out residency at the Drake Hotel in Toronto which was recorded as part of CBC Music's "Live" series. On 26 July 2023, Busty and the Bass released "Wandering Lies," a single that is partly inspired by the spiritual teachings of psychologist Ram Dass.

On 3 October 2023, the collective released "Give Me A Smile" and announced their third LP Forever Never Cares due 17 November 2023, via Arts & Crafts. The album is engineered and mixed by founding member Christopher Vincent and includes features by Terrace Martin and Katie Tupper, who appears on the song "Never Get Enough".

At the 2024 Juno Awards, Busty and the Bass was nominated for Breakthrough Group of the Year.

== Style ==
Busty and the Bass is known for blending musical genres. Their style often incorporates elements of soul and popular music, with harmonic concepts rooted in the jazz tradition. They have collaborated with musical icons such as Parliament-Funkadelic pioneer George Clinton, neo-soul singer Macy Gray, soul/funk band Earth Wind & Fire, members of the hip-hop group Slum Village, jazz saxophonist and producer Terrace Martin, R&B artist Son Little, and Canadian voices like Polaris Music Prize-winners Cadence Weapon and Pierre Kwenders.

After Nick Ferraro left the band during the pandemic, the group's identity evolved as they began to incorporate new musicians into their live shows and recording processes. In the past, the band's musical approach catered predominantly to the vocal stylings of Ferraro and Alistair Blu. After Ferraro's departure, the group's vocal sound expanded and new vocalists including Melissa Pacifico and Jordan Brown began to appear alongside Alistair Blu and guest features.

The collective's instrumentation pays homage to the soul and funk groups of the 1960s and 1970s, though their particular style covers a broader network of influences, from jazz and dance music to alt-R&B and hip hop. The group also credits singer-songwriters, folk artists, and rock bands such as The Beatles as having an impact on their creative output.

== Labels, agencies and management ==
- Managers - Michael Sayegh, Lighter Than Air
- Labels - Arts & Crafts (Canada)
- Agents - Preste Spectacles (Quebec), The Feldman Agency (Canada), Paradigm Talent Agency (USA), Coda Agency (Europe)

== Band members ==
Current members

- Scott Bevins – trumpet
- Alistair Blu – vocals, keyboard, synthesizer
- Eric Haynes – piano, keyboard
- Milo Johnson – bass
- Louis Stein – guitar
- Julian Trivers – drums
- Chris Vincent – trombone
- Jordan Brown – vocals

Past members

- Nick Ferraro – vocals, alto saxophone
- Mike McCann – trumpet

Added contributors and touring musicians

- Jordan Brown – vocals
- Melissa Pacifico – vocals
- Wayne Tennant – vocals
- Dave Hjin – guitar

== Discography ==
=== Studio albums ===
- Uncommon Good (2017)
- Eddie (2020)
- Forever Never Cares (2023)

=== Extended plays ===
- GLAM (2015)
- LIFT (2016)
- ET Suite (2021)
- Karneval (2022)

=== Singles ===
- "Tryna Find Myself" (2015)
- "The Real" (2015)
- "Models" (2015)
- "Miss Judge" (2016)
- "Stages (Don't Know Why)" (2016)
- "Up Top" (2017)
- "Memories and Melodies" (2017)
- "Common Ground" (2017)
- "Closer" (2017)
- "Jimmy" (featuring Pierre Kwenders) (2018)
- "Out of Love" (2020)
- "Summer" (2020)
- "ET Suite" (2021)
- "Bad Behavior - Busty and the Bass Remix" (2021)
- "Airplanes/Caribou" (2022)
- "Karneval" (2022)
- "All the Things I Couldn't Say to You" (2022)
- "Far from Here" (2023)
- "Wandering Lies" (2023)
- "Give Me A Smile" (2023)
- "Never Get Enough" (2023)
