= Somebody Loves You Baby (You Know Who It Is) =

Single by Patti LaBelle

from the album Burnin'
- Released: January 14, 1992
- Genre: R&B
- Label: MCA
- Songwriters: Bunny Sigler; Eugene "Lambchops" Curry
- Producers: Sigler; Curry (co.)

Patti LaBelle singles chronology
"Feels Like Another One" (1991)	"Somebody Loves You Baby (You Know Who It Is)" (1992)	"When You've Been Blessed (Feels Like Heaven)" (1992)

Music video
- "Somebody Loves You Baby (You Know Who It Is)" on YouTube

"Somebody Loves You Baby (You Know Who It Is)" is a song by American singer Patti LaBelle. It was written and produced by Bunny Sigler and Eugene "Lambchops" Curry for her 1991 studio album, Burnin'. The song reached number two on the US Billboard Hot R&B/Hip-Hop Songs in early 1992. Like her previous single "Feels Like Another One", the video was shot at the Apollo Theater.

Rapper Plies later sampled the song for his track, "Somebody (Loves You)" off his second release, Definition of Real. The song is featured in series Happily Divorced sung by one of the characters.

Rapper Trina also sampled the song for the track "If It Ain't Me" featuring K. Michelle from her 2019 album, The One.

== Credits and personnel ==
Credits adapted from the liner notes of Gems.

- Patti LaBelle – executive producer, vocals
- Eugene "Lambchops" Curry – co-producer, writer
- Bunny Sigler – producer, writer
- Michael Stokes – executive A&R

== Charts ==
Chart (1991–1992)	Peak position
US Hot R&B/Hip-Hop Songs (Billboard)	2
