= Feels Like Another One =

Single by Patti LaBelle

from the album Burnin'
- Released: September 17, 1991
- Length: 5:08 (album version); 4:19 (single version)
- Label: MCA
- Songwriters: Patti LaBelle; Sharon Barnes; James R. "Budd" Ellison; Michael Stokes
- Producer: Michael Stokes

Patti LaBelle singles chronology
"Superwoman" (1991)	"Feels Like Another One" (1991)	"Somebody Loves You Baby (You Know Who It Is)" (1991)

"Feels Like Another One" is a song by American singer Patti LaBelle. It was written by LaBelle along with Sharon Barnes, James R. "Budd" Ellison, and Michael Stokes for her eleventh studio album Burnin (1991), while production was helmed by Stokes. The new jack swing-styled track served as the album's leading single and featured a rap from rapper Big Daddy Kane. The song became successful on the US Hot R&B/Hip-Hop Songs as it ended up peaking at number three. The video for the song was shot at the Apollo Theater and also featured Kane, who appeared at LaBelle's show wearing a tux.

== Credits and personnel ==
Credits adapted from the liner notes of Burnin''.

- Sharon Barnes – executive producer, vocals, writer
- Big Daddy Kane - rap
- James R. "Budd" Ellison – associate producer, writer
- Patti LaBelle – writer, lead vocals
- Michael Stokes – arranger, producer, writer

== Charts ==
Chart (1991)	Peak position
US Hot R&B/Hip-Hop Songs (Billboard)	3
