= Burnin' (Patti LaBelle album) =

Studio album by Patti LaBelle
- Released: October 1, 1991
- Recorded: March–July 1991
- Genre: R&B
- Length: 59:11
- Label: MCA
- Producer: Walter Afanasieff; Michael Bolton; James R. "Budd" Ellison; Clarence McDonald; Sami McKinney; Michael J. Powell; Bunny Sigler; Michael Stokes

Patti LaBelle chronology
This Christmas (1990)	Burnin' (1991)	Live! (1992)

Burnin' is a studio album by American recording artist Patti LaBelle. It was released by MCA Records on October 1, 1991, in the United States to mixed reviews. The album features several collaborations, including duets with Gladys Knight and Michael Bolton, and a reunion track with Nona Hendryx and Sarah Dash from Labelle. It yielded three Billboard R&B chart hits: "Feels Like Another One", "Somebody Loves You Baby (You Know Who It Is)" and "When You've Been Blessed (Feels Like Heaven)".

The album, released on CD, LP, and cassette, was certified Gold in April 1992 by the Recording Industry Association of America for sales in excess of 500,000 copies. It reached number 71 on the Billboard 200 and number 13 on Top R&B/Hip-Hop Albums. Burnin' won the Grammy Award for Best Female R&B Vocal Performance at the 1992 ceremony, jointly with a single by Lisa Fischer. In 1992, LaBelle released her first solo live album, simply titled Live!, featuring several songs from Burnin' as it was recorded during this album's promotional tour.

Under the pseudonym "Paisley Park", Prince co-wrote the song "I Hear Your Voice" along with his vocalist collaborator Rosie Gaines and her husband, Francis Jules. Prince helped produce the track. The album track "Temptation", B-side of the fourth single released from the album, "When You Love Somebody (I'm Saving My Love for You)", was written by Cuban-American singer Martika, who originally released it on her album Martika's Kitchen.

== Critical reception ==
Professional ratings
Review scores
Source	Rating
AllMusic	3/5 stars
Calgary Herald	B
Chicago Tribune	3/4 stars
Entertainment Weekly	B+
Los Angeles Times	2.5/4 stars
Rolling Stone	3.5/5 stars

The album earned largely mixed reviews. Chicago Tribune editor Mitchell May felt that while LaBelle was once known for her aggressive, overpowering performance style, she was adopting a noticeably more restrained, cooler approach on Burnin', writing: "Maybe the pressure to go all out on every note was eased by the presence of guest artists like Gladys Knight, Luther Vandross, Michael Bolton and Big Daddy Kane." Dave Obee from Calgary Herald wrote, "Not only is she on fire, she's lighting matches and tossing them in all directions. Many hit gravel and quickly burn out. Look out, though, for the ones that touch anything flammable. Consider the song "I Don't Do Duets", a duet [...] with Gladys Knight. Listen as two of the strongest, most soulful and experienced voices turn a fair-to-average song into a R&B masterpiece. It's no surprise that La Belle couldn't keep the heat turned up at that level for the entire disc, but the best stuff here more than makes up for its weak moments."

Arion Berger from Entertainment Weekly gave it a B+ and wrote: "Most of the material displays LaBelle's show-biz-soul wailing and emoting to perfection, whether she's up on her feet. Except for the sloppily sentimental "I Don't Do Duets," LaBelle rises to the challenge of the material here [...] Burnin' is smart and resourceful." Connie Johnson of The Los Angeles Times ranked Burnin' two and a half out of five stars, noting a reduction of LaBelle's usual intensity, while AllMusic's Ron Wynn remarked that the album was "more a presentation and entertainment spectacle than a memorable production" and called it an "aesthetic disappointment."

== Track listing ==
Burnin' track listing
No.	Title	Writer(s)	Producer(s)	Length
1.	"Feels Like Another One"	Patti LaBelle; Sharon Barnes; James R. "Budd" Ellison; Michael Stokes	Stokes, Ellison	5:08
2.	"Somebody Loves You Baby (You Know Who It Is)"	Walter "Bunny" Sigler; Eugene "Lambchops" Curry	Sigler; Curry^{[A]}	4:53
3.	"When You Love Somebody (I'm Saving My Love for You)"	Jonathan Butler; Graham Lyle	Ellison	4:22
4.	"I Don't Do Duets" (duet with Gladys Knight)	Marvin Hamlisch; Alan Bergman; Marilyn Bergman	Michael J. Powell	5:53
5.	"Temptation"	Martika; Frankie Blue; Les Pierce	Stokes	4:03
6.	"When You've Been Blessed (Feels Like Heaven)"	Patti LaBelle; Nona Hendryx; Ellison; Nathanial Wilkie	Ellison	4:55
7.	"Burnin' (The Fire Is Still) Burnin' for You"	Sigler; Curry	Sigler; Curry^{[A]}	5:29
8.	"I Hear Your Voice"	Rosie Gaines; Paisley Park; Francis Jules	Park; Stokes^{[A]}; Ellison^{[A]}	4:22
9.	"We're Not Makin' Love Anymore" (duet with Michael Bolton)	Bolton; Diane Warren	Bolton; Walter Afanasieff	4:43
10.	"Release Yourself" (with Sarah Dash and Nona Hendryx from Labelle)	Hendryx; Warren McRae	Ellison; Nathaniel "Crockett" Wilkie^{[B]}	4:54
11.	"Love Never Dies"	LaBelle; Clarence McDonald; Sami McKinney; Michael Thomas	McKinney; McDonald	5:33
12.	"Crazy Love"	David Lasley; Allan Rich; Robin Lerner; Marsha Malamet	Michael J. Powell	4:56
Total length:				59:11

Notes

- ^{^[A]} denotes co-producer
- ^{^[B]} denotes associate producer
- The single mix of "Feels Like Another One" features rap by Big Daddy Kane.
- "Temptation" is a bonus track for CD and cassette. "Crazy Love" is a bonus track for CD and LP. As of 2012, both tracks are available for digital download.

== Personnel ==
Performers and musicians

- Patti LaBelle – lead vocals, additional vocal arrangements (1), backing vocals (3, 4), choir arrangements (6)
- Clinton Stokes III – keyboards (1, 5)
- Michael Stokes – keyboards (1, 5), keyboard programming (1), drum programming (1), arrangements (1, 5), rhythm arrangements (5), horn arrangements (5), BGV arrangements (5)
- David Ervin – synthesizers (1), keyboards (5), keyboard programming (5), drum programming (5)
- Darren Floyd – synthesizers (1), keyboard programming (1, 5), drum programming (1, 5), keyboards (5)
- Eugene Curry – keyboards (2, 7)
- Nathaniel Wilkie – keyboards (3, 6, 10), synthesizer programming (3, 6, 10)
- James Budd Ellison – arrangements (3, 6, 10), keyboards (6, 10), choir arrangements (6)
- Vernon Fails – keyboards (4, 12)
- Greg Phillinganes – acoustic piano (4, 12)
- David Ward – keyboard programming (4, 12), drum programming (4)
- Walter Afanasieff – keyboards (9), synthesizers (9), synth bass (9), drums (9), percussion (9)
- Louis Biancaniello – programming (9)
- Ren Klyce – programming (9)
- John Anthony – samples (10)
- David Hampton – technical support and cartage (11)
- Robert Palmer – additional programming (11)
- Wah Wah Watson – guitars (1, 5)
- Joe Marioni – guitars (2, 7)
- Randy Bowland – guitar (3, 10), acoustic guitar (3)
- Michael J. Powell – guitars (4, 12), drums (4), percussion (4, 12)
- Chris Camozzi – guitars (9)
- Milton "Pocket" Honroe – guitar overdubs (11)
- Al Turner – bass (4)
- Freddie Washington – bass overdubs (11)
- Nathan East – bass (12)
- John Paris – drums (10)
- John Robinson – drums (12)
- Quinton Joseph – percussion (2, 7), drum programming (7)
- Terral Santiel – percussion overdubs (11)
- Ernie Fields Jr. – saxophones (1, 5)
- Pamela Williams – saxophone (10)
- George Bohanon – trombone (1, 5)
- Raymond Lee Brown – trumpet (1, 5)
- Nolan Smith – trumpet (1, 5)
- Jack Faith – horn and string orchestrations (3)
- Paul Riser – string arrangements (12)
- Big Daddy Kane – rap (1)
- Dee Harvey – backing vocals (1, 5)
- Rick Nelson – backing vocals (1, 5)
- Linda Stokes – backing vocals (1, 5)
- Lisa Taylor – backing vocals (1, 5)
- Annette Hardeman – backing vocals (2, 7)
- Charlene Holloway – backing vocals (2, 7)
- Paula Holloway – backing vocals (2, 7)
- Bunny Sigler – backing vocals (2, 7), vocal arrangements (2, 7), choir arrangements (6)
- Tawatha Agee – backing vocals (3)
- Lisa Fischer – backing vocals (3)
- Paulette McWilliams – backing vocals (3)
- Fonzi Thornton – backing vocals (3), vocal contractor (3)
- Luther Vandross – backing vocals (3), BGV arrangements (3)
- Brenda White King – backing vocals (3)
- Gladys Knight – lead and backing vocals (4)
- Valerie Pinkston-Mayo – backing vocals (4)
- Fred White – backing vocals (4)
- The Wilmington/Chester Mass Choir – choir (6)
- Rev. Ernest Davis Jr. – choir director (6)
- Michael Bolton – lead vocals (9)
- LaBelle – backing vocals (10)
- The Harmonettes – backing vocals (11)
- Sami McKinney – vocal arrangements (11)

Technical

- Patti LaBelle – executive producer
- James Budd Ellison – associate producer (1), recording supervisor
- Eugene Curry – co-producer (2)
- Edward Leak – assistant producer (3)
- Nathaniel Wilkie – associate producer (3, 6, 10), co-producer (7)
- Michael Stokes – co-producer (8, 11)
- Frank Byron Clark – recording (1, 5), mixing (1, 5, 8)
- Jim Gallagher – recording (2, 7)
- Scott MacMinn – recording (2, 7)
- Ray Bardani – recording (3, 6)
- Milton Chan – recording (4), assistant engineer (4, 12)
- David Ward – recording (4, 12)
- Michael Koppleman – recording (8)
- Dana Chappelle – recording (9)
- Khaliq Glover – recording (12)
- Warren Wood – recording (12)
- Mike Tarsia – mixing (2, 3, 6, 7, 10), recording (3, 6, 10)
- Barney Perkins – mixing (4, 12), recording (12)
- Michael J. Powell – mixing (4, 12)
- Mick Guzauski – mixing (9)
- Jeff Lorenzen – mixing (12)
- Foley Fali – assistant engineer (1, 5, 8)
- Clinton Stokes III – assistant engineer (1, 5)
- Frank McNulty – assistant engineer (2, 3, 6, 7, 10)
- Tom Greto – assistant engineer (3, 6, 10)
- Robert H. – assistant engineer (3, 6, 10)
- Paul Rinis – assistant engineer (3, 6, 10)
- Brian Wittmer – assistant engineer (3, 6, 10)
- Paul D. Allen – assistant engineer (4, 12)
- Manny LaCarrubba – assistant engineer (9)
- Devon Riteveld – assistant engineer (9)
- Bernie Grundman – mastering
- Vartan Kurjian – art direction
- John Coulter – design
- Marc Raboy – photography
- Armstaed Edwards – direction

Studios

- Recorded at Blue Palm Studios (Burbank, CA); Creative Source Studios (Hollywood, CA); Larrabee Sound Studios (North Hollywood, CA); Record Plant (Sausalito, CA); The Hit Factory (New York, NY); Sigma Sound Studios (Philadelphia, PA); Paisley Park Studios (Minneapolis, MN); Vanguard Studios (Detroit, MI).
- Mixed at Creative Source Studios; Record Plant; Sigma Sound Studios; Elumba Studios (Los Angeles, CA); Encore Studios (Burbank, CA).
- Mastered at Bernie Grundman Mastering (Hollywood, CA).

== Charts ==
=== Weekly charts ===
Weekly chart performance for Burnin'
Chart (1991)	Peak position
Australian Albums (ARIA)	184
US Billboard 200	71
US Top R&B/Hip-Hop Albums (Billboard)	9
US Top 200 Albums (Cashbox)	66
US Top 75 R&B Albums (Cashbox)	11

=== Year-end charts ===
Year-end chart performance for Burnin'
Chart (1992)	Position
US Top R&B/Hip-Hop Albums (Billboard)	12

== Certifications ==
Certifications for Burnin'
Region	Certification	Certified units/sales
United States (RIAA)	Gold	500,000^{^}
^{^} Shipments figures based on certification alone.
