= Now, Then & Forever =

Studio album by Earth, Wind & Fire
- Released: September 10, 2013
- Recorded: 2012–2013
- Studios: NuVintage Recording Studio A (Tarzana, California); Mungo Bungo Studio (Rancho Cucamongo, California); Blakeslee Studios and NRG Studios (North Hollywood, California); Ritesonian Recording Studio (Van Nuys, California); The Mix Room (Burbank, California); Vivrant Street (Los Angeles, California); Germano Studios (New York City, New York); Dunn-Elliott Studios; TheHotPurplePettingZoo (Atlanta, Georgia)
- Genres: R&B, funk
- Length: 43:21
- Label: Legacy
- Producers: Philip J. Bailey; Philip D. Bailey; Larry Dunn; Myron McKinley; Justin Paraniello; Walt B.; Neal Pogue

Earth, Wind & Fire chronology
S.O.U.L. (2013)	Now, Then & Forever (2013)	Holiday (2014)

Singles from Now, Then and Forever
- 1. "Guiding Lights" Released: 2012; 2. "My Promise" Released: 2013; 3. "Sign On" Released: 2013

Now, Then & Forever is the twentieth studio album by American band Earth, Wind & Fire, released on September 10, 2013. It was released by Legacy Recordings and Sony Music. The album reached No. 11 on the US Billboard 200 and No. 6 on the Top R&B/Hip-Hop Albums chart.

== Overview ==
This is the first Earth, Wind & Fire album without musical input from founder Maurice White, although he supplied a note in the album's liner notes:

As we see today’s technology uniting the world wide web, sometimes it seems that the hearts of men are growing more distant from each other. It is my hope that this music will continue to tie past to future, reminding us of the love that united us to our ancestors, and to our descendants, and to each other. Peace,

— Maurice White

Larry Dunn, a former Earth, Wind & Fire bandmember, features as a keyboardist on the album. A deluxe edition came coupled with a compilation album.

== Singles ==
The track "Guiding Lights" rose to No. 16 on the Billboard Smooth Jazz Songs chart and No. 30 on the Billboard Adult R&B Songs chart. Another single, "My Promise", reached No. 28 on the Billboard Adult R&B Songs chart and No. 30 on the Billboard Adult Contemporary Songs chart.

== Critical reception ==
Professional ratings
Review scores
Source	Rating
AllMusic	3/5 stars
Exclaim	(8/10)
Popmatters	(favourable)
People	(favourable)
Daily Record	(3/5)
RTÉ	(4/5)
Daily Mirror	3/5 stars
Record Collector	4/5 stars
Blues & Soul	(9/10)

Matt Bauer of Exclaim gave the album an eight out of ten rating, noting that "Now, Then & Forever is a more than worthy addition to the Earth Wind & Fire catalogue." With a four out of five rating, Harry Guerin of RTÉ called Now, Then & Forever "One of the surprises of the year." Elias Leight of Popmatters wrote "Now, Then & Forever has all the old colors and grooves, an impeccable rhythm section, prominent guitars, and indomitable horns that trace and re-trace motifs, dancing rings around everything." With a three out of five stars rating, Gavin Martin of the Daily Mirror exclaimed "Elements of greatness remain but the songs aren't classics." Daryl Easlea of Record Collector gave a four out of five stars rating and found that "Now, Then And Forever, is a splendid diversion that recalls – in spirit alone, of course – Rick Rubin’s recent work with Black Sabbath. It also sounds like a lost album that should have come out after 1979’s I Am: a very shrewd approximation of the EWF we know and love, it’s crammed with sophisticated R&B, gossamer-light jazz and powerful, soulful vocals with a positive message. Andy Kellman of AllMusic gave a three out of five stars rating saying "Now, Then & Forever demonstrates the lasting value of the band's classic sound." With a three out of five rating the Daily Record called Now, Then & Forever "a worthy effort, and EWF are clearly using old glories as inspiration for the future."

== Track listing ==
No.	Title	Writer(s)	Length
1.	"Sign On" (Feat. Daniel McClain)	Philip D. Bailey, Sharlotte Gibson, Austin Jacobs, Daniel McClain, Neal H. Pogue, Darrin Simpson	4:17
2.	"Love Is Law"	Allen Bundy, Lee Hutson, Jr., Jairus Lemuel-Jada Mozee, Ric'key Pageot, Eric Rousseau, Meg Todd	4:20
3.	"My Promise"	Siedah Garrett, Austin Jacobs, Darrin Simpson	3:22
4.	"Guiding Lights"	Philip D. Bailey, Austin Jacobs, Daniel McClain, Darrin Simpson	6:24
5.	"Got to Be Love"	Philip D. Bailey, Philip J. Bailey, Ralph Johnson, Myron McKinley	3:41
6.	"Belo Horizonte"	Raymond Crossley, Frederick A. Johnson, Ralph Johnson, Morris O'Connor	1:50
7.	"Dance Floor"	Philip D. Bailey, Sondria Bailey, Justin Panariello	4:59
8.	"Splashes"	Philip D. Bailey, Justin Panariello	5:21
9.	"Night of My Life"	Philip D. Bailey, Jevon McGlory, Justin Panariello	4:00
10.	"The Rush"	Philip J. Bailey, Larry Dunn, Allee Willis	5:07

Target edition bonus tracks
No.	Title	Writer(s)	Length
11.	"Hero As He Rose"	Philip D. Bailey, Jevon McGlory, Justin Panariello	4:00
12.	"Whirlwind"	Hiroto Kobayashi, Luisa Dunn, Larry Dunn	5:37

Best Buy bonus tracks
No.	Title	Writer(s)	Length
11.	"Can't Hide Love (Masters at Work Remix)"	Skip Scarborough
12.	"Shining Star (DJ Jin Asakusa Samba Remix)"	Philip Bailey, Larry Dunn, Maurice White

French bonus track
No.	Title	Writer(s)	Length
11.	"My Promise" (featuring Omar Sy)	Siedah Garrett, Austin Jacobs, Darrin Simpson	3:25

Deluxe edition bonus tracks
No.	Title	Writer(s)	Length
11.	"Boogie Wonderland" (featuring The Emotions)	Jon Lind, Allee Willis
12.	"Sing a Song"	Al McKay, Maurice White
13.	"September"	Al McKay, Maurice White, Allee Willis
14.	"Let's Groove"	Wayne Vaughn, Maurice White
15.	"Got to Get You into My Life"	John Lennon, Paul McCartney
16.	"After the Love Has Gone"	David Foster, Jay Graydon, Bill Champlin

International edition Disc 2
No.	Title	Writer(s)	Length
13.	"Can't Let Go"	Bill Meyers, Maurice White, Allee Willis
14.	"Runnin'"	Maurice, White, Larry Dunn, Eddie DelBarrio
15.	"Shining Star"	Philip Bailey, Larry Dunn, Maurice White
16.	"Turn It Into Something Good"	Valerie Carter, James Newton Howard, Maurice White
17.	"Power"	Maurice White, Earth, Wind & Fire
18.	"You And I"	Maurice White, Allee Willis, David Foster
19.	"Fantasy"	Maurice White, Verdine White, Eddie DelBarrio

Japan Limited Edition Disc 2
No.	Title	Writer(s)	Length
13.	"Can't Let Go"	Bill Meyers, Maurice White, Allee Willis
14.	"Runnin’"	Maurice, White, Larry Dunn, Eddie DelBarrio
15.	"Shining Star"	Philip Bailey, Larry Dunn, Maurice White
16.	"Turn It Into Something Good"	Valerie Carter, James Newton Howard, Maurice White
17.	"Power"	Maurice White, Earth, Wind & Fire
18.	"You And I"	Maurice White, Allee Willis, David Foster
19.	"Fantasy"	Maurice White, Verdine White, Eddie DelBarrio
20.	"Can't Hide Love"	Skip Scarborough
21.	"September"	Al McKay, Maurice White, Allee Willis
22.	"September (DJ KOMORI Remix)"	Al McKay, Maurice White, Allee Willis
23.	"Let's Groove (TJO & YUSUKE from BLU-SWING Remix)"	Maurice White, Wayne Vaughn

== Personnel ==
Adapted from the album's text.

Earth, Wind & Fire
- Philip Bailey – lead vocals (1-5, 7-10), backing vocals (4, 5, 7, 9, 10), vocals (8), percussion
- Verdine White – bass (1-5, 7-10)
- Ralph Johnson – drums, percussion

With:

- Myron McKinley – Rhodes electric piano (5), synthesizers (5, 8), keyboards (8)
- Morris O'Connor – guitars
- Greg Moore – guitars (4, 8)
- John Paris – drums (1-5, 7-10)
- Gary Bias – alto saxophone (4, 5, 7, 9), tenor saxophone (4, 5, 7, 9)
- Reggie Young – trombone (1, 2, 4, 5, 7, 9, 10)
- Wendell Kelly – trombone (3)
- Philip Doran Bailey – backing vocals (1-5, 7, 9, 10), vocals (8), drum programming (9)
- B David Whitworth – backing vocals (1-5, 7, 9, 10), percussion

Additional musicians

- Larry Dunn – keyboards (1, 2, 5-9), Minimoog (2, 10), grand piano (3), Rhodes electric piano (4, 10), Moog Voyager (4-9), Hammond B3 organ (10), acoustic piano (10)
- Austin Jacobs – keyboards (1), programming (1, 3), synthesizers (3), horn arrangements (3)
- Darrin Simpson – keyboards (1, 3), programming (1, 3), guitars (1, 3), horn arrangements (1), acoustic piano (3), organ (3)
- Rickey Pageot – keyboards (2)
- Kenny Moran – synthesizers (9), drum programming (9)
- Juan F. Villaluna – guitars (1)
- Jarius Mozee – guitars (2)
- John "Jubu" Smith – guitars (2)
- Errol Cooney – guitars (5, 9)
- Neal Pogue – percussion (1, 3)
- David Leach – percussion (4, 10)
- Munyungo Jackson – percussion (6-9)
- Satnam Ramgotra – tabla (8)
- Fred Jackson, Jr. – tenor saxophone (1, 2, 10), flute (2, 10)
- Mark Visher – baritone saxophone (3), tenor saxophone (3)
- Duane Benjamin – trombone (1-3, 10)
- Nick Lane – trombone (1, 2, 10)
- Eric Jorgensen – trombone (3)
- Sal Cracchiolo – trumpet (1, 2, 10)
- James Ford – trumpet (1-3, 10)
- Christopher Gray – trumpet (1, 2, 10)
- Matt Fronke – trumpet (3)
- John Papenbrook – trumpet (3)
- Gary Grant – trumpet (4, 5, 9), flugelhorn (5, 9)
- Michael "Patches" Stewart – trumpet (4)
- Chuck Findley – trumpet (5, 7, 9), flugelhorn (5, 7, 9)
- Terence Blanchard – trumpet (8)
- Benjamin Wright – horn arrangements (1-3, 10)
- Jerry Hey — horn arrangements (4, 5, 7, 9)
- Daniel McClain – lead vocals (1), backing vocals (1-5, 7, 9, 10)
- Siedah Garrett – backing vocals (3)
- Jevon McGlory – backing vocals (7)
- Reggie Dozier — horn engineer
- Larry Dunn — engineer
- Austin Jacobs — producer
- Paul Klingberg — engineer
- Justin Merrill — engineer
- Kenny Moran — engineer, percussion engineer
- Vernon Mungo — vocal engineer
- Jeremiah Olvera — mix assistant
- Dave Pensado — mixing
- Neal Pogue — additional production, engineer, mixing
- Dave Rideau — engineer
- Darrin Simpson — producer
- Verdine White — mix assistant

=== Production ===
- Damien Smith – A&R direction, management
- Neal Pogue – A&R direction, producer (1, 3, 4)
- Verdine White – co-executive producer
- Philip Bailey – executive producer, producer (5-9)
- Walter "Walt B" McKennie – producer (1, 3, 4)
- J.R. Hutson – producer (2)
- Myron McKinley – producer (5)
- Philip Doran Bailey – producer (7-9)
- Justin Panariello – producer (7, 9)
- Larry Dunn – producer (10)
- Trinity Bailey – A&R coordinator
- Jennifer Feinberg – project director
- Jim Parham – project director
- Tishaun Dawson – creative director, cover art
- Don Pace – cover art
- Mathieu Bitton – design
- Randee St. Nicholas – photography
- Dr. Billy Ingram – insert photography
- Irving Azoff – management

== Charts ==
=== Weekly charts ===
Chart (2013)	Peak position
Austrian Albums (Ö3 Austria)	75
Belgian Albums (Ultratop Flanders)	171
Belgian Albums (Ultratop Wallonia)	121
French Albums (SNEP)	94
German Albums (Offizielle Top 100)	55
Japanese Albums (Oricon)	34
South Korean Albums (Circle)	26
Italian Albums (FIMI)	14
Dutch Albums (Album Top 100)	35
Scottish Albums (Official Charts)	48
Swiss Albums (Schweizer Hitparade)	85
Spanish Albums (Promusicae)	96
UK Albums (Official Charts)	25
US Billboard 200	11
US Top R&B/Hip-Hop Albums (Billboard)	6

=== Year-end charts ===
Chart (2013)	Position
US Top R&B/Hip-Hop Albums (Billboard)	80

Singles - Billboard (US)

Year	Single	Chart	Position
2012	"Guiding Lights"	US Billboard Smooth Jazz Songs	16
2012	"Guiding Lights"	US Billboard Adult R&B Songs	30
2013	"My Promise"	US Billboard Adult R&B Songs	28
2013	"My Promise"	US Billboard Adult Contemporary Songs	30

== Certifications ==
Region	Certification	Certified units/sales
United Kingdom (BPI)	Gold	100,000^{‡}
^{‡} Sales+streaming figures based on certification alone.
