= Attack of the Mutant Underwear =

Book by Tom Birdseye

- First edition
- Author: Tom Birdseye
- Language: English
- Genre: Children's novel
- Publisher: Holiday House (2003); Puffin Books (2006); Open Road Media (2014)
- Publication date: 2003
- Publication place: United States
- Media type: Print (Hardcover, Paperback), e-book
- Pages: 199 pp
- ISBN: 0-823-41689-5 (Hardcover edition)
- OCLC: 50561614
- LC Class: PZ7.B5213 At 2003

Attack of the Mutant Underwear is a 2003 novel by children's author Tom Birdseye. The work was first published in hardback on October 1, 2003 through Holiday House and was subsequently re-released in paperback in 2006 through Puffin Books. An e-book version was released in 2014 through Open Road Media. Attack of the Mutant Underwear is written in diary form and follows the misadventures of fifth-grader Cody Carson.

In 2007 the work was removed from the Battle of the Books program for the school district of Pinellas County, Florida, but remained on the state's life of books for the Sunshine State Young Reader's Award.

== Reception ==
Critical reception for Attack of the Mutant Underwear has been positive. Publishers Weekly gave a mixed review for the book, writing "The author hits a few shaky notes (e.g., Cody's disdain for cleaning his cat's litter box becomes tedious; his infatuation for Amy stretches credibility, as when he refers to himself as "Loverboy" in his journal). But many passages compensate for them—including the way Cody couches his bungling of the talent show as a step-by-step formula for creating a "really good disaster.""
