= Uncommon Good =

Studio album by Busty and the Bass
- Released: September 8, 2017
- Genres: Electro, soul, hip hop, funk
- Length: 44:13
- Label: Indica Records
- Producer: Neal Pogue

Busty and the Bass chronology
Lift EP (2016)	Uncommon Good (2017)	Eddie (2020)

Singles from Uncommon Good
- 1. "Up Top" Released: January 19, 2017; 2. "Memories and Melodies" Released: April 5, 2017; 3. "Common Ground" Released: June 30, 2017; 4. "Closer" Released: August 25, 2017

Uncommon Good is the debut studio album from Canadian electro-soul band Busty and the Bass. It was released on September 8, 2017, by Indica Records. The album's title comes from the band's relationship with their fans, and how music "has a beautiful ability to bring people together and raise their spirits regardless of what else is going on either with them personally or in the world".

== Singles ==
The album's lead single "Up Top" was released on January 19, 2017. Its second single, "Memories and Melodies", came out on April 5, 2017. The final two singles, "Common Ground" and "Closer" were made available on June 30, 2017 and August 25, 2017, respectively.

== Production ==
Busty and the Bass spent nearly two years writing and recording the album. Compared to the band’s earlier releases, Uncommon Good was crafted as a body of work, and less as a collection of songs. The album was mixed and executive produced by Neal Pogue, who is known for his work with acts like OutKast, Lil Wayne, Earth, Wind & Fire, Snoop Dogg, Nicki Minaj, and Aretha Franklin. When asked about the record's theme, Ferraro remarked, "The album ended up accidentally being the roadmap of our growth and change. It starts with a playful side from our days fresh out of school and ends on some more introspective tones as we tried to figure out the real world."

Uncommon Good was entirely recorded at the Indica Records studio. When speaking to WithGuitars, Blu stated, "Uncommon Good represents a much more developed and mature version of our sound. It saw us moving away from the home-basement tracking that we did ourselves to a more encompassing studio environment." The band's songwriting process varied from song to song, but generally started with one or two band members composing a piece of music that would later be shared with everyone else.

== Release ==
The album was officially announced by the band on June 30, 2017. On September 8, 2017, Busty and the Bass released Uncommon Good.

== Track listing ==
All tracks written and recorded by Busty and the Bass.

Uncommon Good
No.	Title	Lead vocals	Length
1.	"Children"	Ferraro	0:59
2.	"Up Top"	Ferraro	4:37
3.	"Memories and Melodies"	Crofton, Ferraro	4:59
4.	"Things Change"	Ferraro	4:33
5.	"Free Shoes"	Ferraro	4:15
6.	"Closer"	Ferraro	4:15
7.	"Bad Trip"	Crofton	4:03
8.	"Common Ground"	Ferraro	5:36
9.	"Dance with Someone!!!"	Crofton	5:25
10.	"Dead Poet"	Ferraro	5:13
Total length:			44:13

== Personnel ==
Album credits adapted from the liner notes of Uncommon Good.

Busty and the Bass

- Scott Bevins – trumpet
- Alistair Blu – vocals, keyboard, synthesizer
- Nick Ferraro – vocals, alto saxophone, flute
- Eric Haynes – piano, keyboard
- Milo Johnson – bass, cello
- Mike McCann – trumpet
- Louis Stein – guitar, banjo
- Julian Trivers – drums, percussion
- Chris Vincent – trombone, trumpet, engineer

Additional personnel

- Peter Edward – engineer
- Brian Gardner – mastering
- Neal Pogue – mixing, executive producer
- Patrick Steele – engineer
- Jesse String – engineer

Artwork

- Sarah Ives – album artwork
- Juliana Bergen – photography
