= Holiday (Earth, Wind & Fire album) =

Studio album by Earth, Wind & Fire
- Released: October 21, 2014
- Studios: NRG Studios and LAFX Recording Services (North Hollywood, California); Capitol Studios (Hollywood, California); Mungo Bungo Studio (Rancho Cucamonga, California; Miloco Musicbox Studios (London, UK)
- Genres: Christmas, R&B
- Length: 47:22
- Label: Legacy
- Producers: Philip Bailey: Myron McKinley; Philip Doran Bailey

Earth, Wind & Fire chronology
Now, Then & Forever (2013)	Holiday (2014)	The Classic Christmas Album (2015)

Holiday is the twenty-first studio and the first Christmas album by the American band Earth, Wind & Fire, released in October 2014 by Sony/Legacy. The album reached No. 26 on the Billboard Top R&B/Hip Hop Albums and No. 8 on the Billboard Holiday Albums charts.

== Overview ==
According to longtime band member Verdine White, "We never thought about doing a holiday album before, but Legacy/Sony asked and so have our fans, so we hope the audience likes it."

Along with a number of traditional Christmas songs, Holiday includes two Earth, Wind & Fire songs that were reworked just for this release:

- "Happy Seasons" (originally "Happy Feelin'" from That's the Way of the World, 1975)
- "December" (originally "September" from The Best of Earth, Wind & Fire, Vol. 1, 1978)

== Critical reception ==
Professional ratings
Review scores
Source	Rating
AllMusic	3.5/5 stars
Atlanta Journal-Constitution	(B−)
Blues & Soul	(6/10)
Boston Globe	(favourable)
Exclaim!	(8/10)
LA Times	3/5 stars
New York Times	(mixed)
OffBeat	(favourable)
Record Collector	3/5 stars
The Times	(favourable)

Randy Lewis of the Los Angeles Times gave the album a 3 out of five stars rating and wrote "The venerable R&B band does what it does best here: lays on the hard and heavy funk with fat horn accents and thick rhythmic riffs to propel a batch of time-tested holiday favorites." With an 8 out of 10 rating Matt Bauer of Exclaim! stated "Holiday is here, and it's anything but the uninspired, calculated cash grab that's become all too synonymous with yuletide offerings." Sarah Rodman of The Boston Globe found that "on its first seasonal outing, the legendary R&B outfit brings the joy on a horn-flecked collection of familiar tunes". Simon Redley of Blues & Soul gave a 6 out of 10 rating saying "I usually keep as far away from Christmas albums as turkey or geese should from a kitchen, during the last few weeks of the year! Schmaltzy old chestnuts re-done for the zillionth time, often about as sincere as an MP on your doorstep a few days before an election. So when asked to review this one, I emitted a loud sigh and prepared for an hour or so of tedium. But I actually enjoyed most of this album, and there are some real high spots. The treatment the songs were given means these sound nothing like we have heard them before too." Brett Milano of OffBeat also proclaimed "If you need to funkify your holiday mix (and you’ve already got the Christmas EP that George Porter Jr. released in ’12), this will do fine." With a B− grade Melissa Ruggieri of the Atlanta Journal-Constitution noted "From the opening notes of "Joy to the World," it's apparent that EWF's first-ever holiday album isn't going to stray too far from the legendary R&B-funk band's signature sound with blasts of brass and calls to keep clapping." Daryl Easlea of Record Collector gave a 3 out of 5 stars rating describing the album as "Relentlessly upbeat, beautifully played and staying clear of too many sleigh bell-type clichés, it will provide a perennial alternative to more traditional fare."

== Track listing ==
No.	Title	Writer(s)	Length
1.	"Joy to the World"	Isaac Watts	4:12
2.	"Happy Seasons"	Verdine White, Philip Bailey, Larry Dunn, Maurice White, Al McKay	3:58
3.	"O Come All Ye Faithfull"	John Francis Wade, John Reading	6:06
4.	"Winter Wonderland"	Felix Bernard, Richard B. Smith	3:40
5.	"What Child Is This?"	William Chatterton Dix	3:34
6.	"Away in a Manger"	James Ramses Murray	2:54
7.	"The Little Drummer Boy"	Katherine K. Davis	2:50
8.	"Every Day Is Like Christmas"	Roxanne Seeman, Philipp Steinke	3:26
9.	"The First Noël"	Traditional	4:26
10.	"Sleigh Ride"	Leroy Anderson, Mitchell Parish	2:56
11.	"Snow"	Traditional Japanese	2:31
12.	"Jingle Bell Rock"	Joe Beal, Jim Boothe	3:09
13.	"December"	Maurice White, McKay, Allee Willis	3:40
Total length:			47:22

== Personnel ==
Earth, Wind and Fire

- Maurice White – lead vocals, backing vocals (via archive audio)
- Philip J. Bailey – lead vocals, backing vocals
- Verdine White – bass
- Ralph Johnson – percussion, backing vocals

Additional EWF members

- Philip Doran Bailey – additional lead vocals, backing vocals, additional arrangements
- Myron McKinley – acoustic piano, keyboards, synthesizers
- Morris O'Connor – guitars
- Serg Dimitrijevic – guitars
- John Paris – drums
- B. David Whitworth – percussion, backing vocals
- Gary Bias – alto saxophone, tenor saxophone
- Reggie Young – alto trombone, tenor trombone

Additional musicians

- Bill Meyers – Rhodes electric piano, horn arrangements
- Jerry Peters – organ
- Stacy Lamont Sydnor – percussion
- Wayne Bergeron – trumpet, flugelhorn
- Gary Grant – trumpet, flugelhorn
- Jerry Hey – horn arrangements
- Ray Brown – horn contractor
- Valerie Bailey – backing vocals
- Sherri Bryant – backing vocals
- Lynne Fiddmont – backing vocals
- Tim Kepler – backing vocals
- Daniel McClain – backing vocals

Strings

- Bill Meyers – string arrangements, conductor and leader
- Suzie Katayama – orchestra manager, supervising copyist
- Dwight Mikkelsen, Christopher Mukai and Caryn Rasmussen – music copyists
- Charlie Bisharat – concertmaster
- Armen Ksajikian – principal cello
- Paula Hochhalter, Victor Lawrence, Timothy Loo, George Kim Scholes and Rudy Stein – cello
- Roland Kato – principal viola
- Karen Elaine, Matt Funes and David Walther – viola
- Charlie Bisharat, Susan Chatman, Mario DeLeon, Julie Gigante, Songa Lee, Natalie Leggett, Lucia Micarelli, Alyssa Park, Sara Parkins, Michele Richards, Tereza Stanislav, Jenny Takamatsu, Sarah Thornblade and Josefina Vergara – violin

=== Production ===
- Jeffrey James – A&R
- Philip J. Bailey – executive producer, producer
- Myron McKinley – producer
- Philip Doran Bailey – co-producer
- Verdine White – album sequencing
- Paul Klingberg – rhythm section engineer, vocal session engineer
- Tommy Vicari – horn session engineer
- Jimi Randolph – string session engineer
- Gus Pirelli – additional engineer (13)
- Dave Pensado – mixing at The Mix Room (Burbank, California)
- Brian Gardner – mastering at Bernie Grundman Mastering (Hollywood, California)
- Trinity Bailey – project coordinator
- Gretchen Brennison – product direction
- Jennifer Kirell – product direction
- Matthieu Bitton – art direction, design
- Tishaun Dawson – art direction, design
- Randee St. Nicholas – photography
- Irving Azoff – management
- Damien Smith – management
