= Eddie (album) =

Studio album by Busty and the Bass
- Released: August 14, 2020
- Genres: Electro, soul, hip-hop, funk
- Length: 48:25
- Label: Arts & Crafts
- Producers: Neal Pogue, Verdine White

Busty and the Bass chronology
Uncommon Good (2017)	Eddie (2020)

Singles from Eddie
- 1. "Clouds" Released: November 8, 2019; 2. "Baggy Eyed Dopeman" Released: February 26, 2020; 3. "Kids" Released: May 6, 2020; 4. "Out of Love" Released: June 24, 2020

Professional ratings
Review scores
Source	Rating
Financial Times	3/5 stars
Mojo	4/5 stars
PopMatters	(7/10)

Eddie is the sophomore studio album from Canadian electro-soul band Busty and the Bass. It was released on August 14, 2020, by Arts & Crafts.

== Background ==
Eddie is the band's first release on Arts & Crafts, the Canadian record label home to notable acts such as Broken Social Scene, Japandroids, and BADBADNOTGOOD. It was announced on July 22, 2020. Like their previous full-length Uncommon Good, Eddie was produced by Neal Pogue, who was also heavily involved in the recording process. The album also features contributions from Verdine White of Earth, Wind & Fire, who served as an executive producer. According to the band, Eddie is intended to explore the question: “What advice would you impart on that younger self? And if you could pass your younger self a mixtape, what would it sound like?”.

== Track listing ==
All tracks written and performed by Busty and the Bass.

Eddie
No.	Title	Lead vocals	Length
1.	"Out of Love" (featuring Macy Gray)	Ferraro, Gray	4:51
2.	"Kids"	Ferraro	4:25
3.	"Baggy Eyed Dopeman" (featuring George Clinton)	Crofton, Ferraro, Clinton	3:36
4.	"Clouds" (featuring Amber Navran)	Ferraro, Navran	3:46
5.	"Little Late"	Ferraro	3:50
6.	"Eddie"	Ferraro	4:20
7.	"Figure it Out"	Ferraro	3:58
8.	"Time Don't Make Me a Stranger"	Crofton	3:37
9.	"ET" (featuring Jafé)	Ferraro, Paulino, Crofton	4:01
10.	"Go So Far" (featuring Illa J & Jon Connor)	Crofton, Connor, Illa J	4:03
11.	"Summer"	Ferraro	4:41
12.	"Cold Night"	Ferraro	3:07
Total length:			48:25

== Personnel ==
Personnel adapted from album liner notes.

Busty and the Bass

- Scott Bevins – trumpet
- Alistair Blu – lead and backup vocals, keyboard, synthesizer
- Nick Ferraro – lead vocals, alto saxophone
- Eric Haynes – piano, keyboard, string arrangements
- Milo Johnson – bass
- Louis Stein – guitar, vocals
- Julian Trivers – drums
- Chris Vincent – trombone

Additional musicians

- Macy Gray – vocals (1)
- George Clinton – vocals (3)
- Amber Navran – vocals (4)
- Jafé Paulino – vocals (9)
- Jon Connor – vocals (10)
- Illa J – vocals (10)
- Freddy Spear – string arrangements, string performance (contrabass)
- Georgia Vogeli – strings (violin)
- Katelyn Emery – strings (violin)
- Julien Altmann – strings (violin)
- Thomas Beard – strings (cello)
- Nora Toutain – additional vocals
- Melissa Pacifico – additional vocals
- Mario Allende – additional percussion

Recording personnel

- Busty and the Bass – writing, recording, production
- Neal Pogue – production, mixing, additional engineering, additional writing (3)
- Verdine White – executive production
- Christopher Vincent – engineering
- Noah Mintz – mastering
- George Clinton – additional writing (3)
- Jon Connor – additional writing (10)
- Illa J – additional writing (10)
- James Benjamin – additional production (10)
- Jafé Paulino – additional writing (9)
- Peter Edwards – additional engineering
- Jacob Lacroix-Cardinal – additional engineering

Artwork

- June Barry – album artwork
- Maya Fuhr – photography
- Peter Albert Weir – layout design
