= Sylvia Birdseye =

Australian bus driver (1902–1962)

- Born: Sylvia Jessie Catherine Merrill; 26 January 1902 near Port Augusta
- Died: 9 August 1962 (aged 60); Woodville
- Occupation: Bus driver
- Years active: 1928–1962
- Known for: Operating the first overland bus service to the Eyre Peninsula
- Spouse: Sydney Birdseye (m. 1923; died 1954)
- Children: 2

Sylvia Jessie Catherine Birdseye (née Merrill) (1902–1962) was the first woman to hold a commercial bus driving licence in South Australia. She initiated a regular mail and passenger service between Adelaide and the Eyre Peninsula in 1928.

Sylvia Merrill was born near Port Augusta on 26 January 1902. She was the daughter of Charles De Witt and Elizabeth Ann Merrill. Her father was a station-hand. She moved to Adelaide in 1921 to work in the office of family friend Alfred Birdseye, who had established South Australia's first motor transport, the Adelaide–Mannum bus. She found that driving the buses was more appealing than office work after learning to drive with Alfred's daughter Gladys. Three years later she obtained a licence to drive a passenger vehicle, the first woman in South Australia to do so.

On 23 October 1923, she married Alfred's son Sydney Alick Birdseye, her first dancing partner in Port Augusta. After his father sold the Mannum service in 1926, Sydney and Sylvia began a bus service between Adelaide and Port Augusta. They later extended services to Port Lincoln, Streaky Bay and Ceduna.

The Birdseye bus service fleet of vehicles in 1926. Sylvia stands at the far right of the photo, next to a Studebaker six.

Roads on the Eyre Peninsula were little more than horse tracks before World War II, not particularly suited to a motor bus of the time. Birdseye had a reputation for driving skill and toughness. She wore overalls, changed her own tyres, performed most of the maintenance and repairs and waded creek crossings to ensure the bus could cross safely. Sylvia continued to operate the service after her husband's death in 1954, and was preparing for a service to Port Lincoln when she suffered a stroke in 1962, and died the next day. The Birdseye Highway across the Eyre Peninsula between Cowell and Elliston is named in her honour. It was the first highway in South Australia to be named for a woman.

In 1946, her bus became bogged south of Whyalla, isolated by flood waters for 8 days, with 25 passengers. Rations were dropped to the stranded group from an aircraft.
