= Words (Tony Rich album) =

Studio album by the Tony Rich Project
- Released: January 16, 1996
- Recorded: 1995
- Studios: Doppler (Atlanta, Georgia)
- Genres: R&B, pop
- Length: 41:34
- Labels: LaFace, Arista
- Producer: Tony Rich

The Tony Rich Project chronology
Words (1996)	Birdseye (1998)

Singles from Words
- 1. "Nobody Knows" Released: November 7, 1995; 2. "Like a Woman" Released: August 5, 1996; 3. "Leavin'" Released: November 11, 1996

Words is the debut album by American R&B musician Tony Rich (under the moniker "The Tony Rich Project"), released January 16, 1996, on LaFace Records. The album was produced, written, arranged and performed by Rich. In 1997, the album won the Grammy Award for Best R&B Album.

At the start of 1996 with the acoustic R&B ballad, "Nobody Knows", the song was a hit, peaking at number two for two weeks, going platinum, and spending almost a year on the Billboard Hot 100 (47 weeks).

Three singles were released from Words: "Nobody Knows", "Like a Woman", and "Leavin'".

== Critical reception ==
Professional ratings
Review scores
Source	Rating
AllMusic	4/5 stars
Robert Christgau	(3-star Honorable Mention)
Entertainment Weekly	A
The Guardian	3/5 stars
Los Angeles Times	3.5/4 stars
Muzik	3/5 stars
Q	4/5 stars
Rolling Stone	3/5 stars
USA Today	3/4 stars

The New York Times opined: "Without deviating from the slick, smooth standards of today's pop, [Rich] manages to find his own sound, a mostly acoustic groove topped with laid-back, free-flowing vocals about love, street life and spirituality." The Village Voice concluded that "without a doubt Words is one of the most meticulously arranged collections by an African American pop musician since the '80s heyday of Quincy Jones and [Lionel] Richie & producer James Carmichael."

== Track listing ==
All songs written by Tony Rich except "Nobody Knows" (written by Joe Rich & Don DuBose).

1. "Hey Blue" – 3:48
2. "Nobody Knows" – 5:06
3. "Like a Woman" – 4:08
4. "Grass Is Green" – 4:08
5. "Ghost" – 4:21
6. "Leavin'" – 3:44
7. "Billy Goat" – 4:11
8. "Under Her Spell" – 4:24
9. "Little Ones" – 3:37
10. "Missin' You" – 3:49

== Personnel ==
- Tony Rich – all instruments, vocals, programming
- Nuri – additional vocals on "Under Her Spell"
- Joe Rich – keyboards on "Nobody Knows"
- John Frye – second acoustic guitar on "Ghost"
- Peter Moore – acoustic guitar on "Nobody Knows" and "Missin' You"
- Reggie Griffin – electric guitar on "Hey Blue" and "Missin' You", solo and rhythm guitars on "Like a Woman", feedback on "Ghost", wah wah guitar on "Billy Goat"
- Colin Wolfe – bass guitar on "Ghost"

== Charts ==
=== Weekly charts ===
Weekly chart performance for Words
Chart (1996)	Peak position
Australian Albums (ARIA)	31
Canada Top Albums/CDs (RPM)	29
Dutch Albums (Album Top 100)	27
German Albums (Offizielle Top 100)	71
UK Albums (Official Charts)	27
US Billboard 200	31
US Top R&B/Hip-Hop Albums (Billboard)	18

=== Year-end charts ===
Year-end chart performance for Words
Chart (1996)	Position
US Billboard 200	93

== Certifications ==
Certifications for Words
Region	Certification	Certified units/sales
Canada (Music Canada)	Gold	50,000^{^}
United Kingdom (BPI)	Silver	60,000^{*}
United States (RIAA)	Platinum	1,000,000^{^}
^{*} Sales figures based on certification alone.^{^} Shipments figures based on certification alone.
