= Tom Birdseye =

American children's author

- Born: July 13, 1951 (age 75) Durham, North Carolina, US
- Education: Western Kentucky University (BA, 1974; 1977)
- Notable works: Just Call Me Stupid (1993); Attack of the Mutant (2003)
- Spouse: Debbie Holsclaw (m. 1974)
- Children: 2

Website
- tombirdseye.com

Tom Birdseye (born 1951) is an American children's author. Notable books include Just Call Me Stupid (1993) and Attack of the Mutant Underwear (2003).

== Early life and education ==
Birdseye was born in Durham, North Carolina on July 13, 1951, to Irving Earl and Mary Hughes (née Carmichael) Birdseye. His father was a minister, and his mother was a librarian. He grew up in North Carolina and Kentucky.

He attended the University of Kentucky from 1969 to 72; he then attended Western Kentucky University, from which he earned a Bachelor of Arts (BA) in mass communications in 1974, followed by a BA in elementary education in 1977.

== Career ==
Birdseye began his career as an educator, teaching in public schools. He also spent time teaching English in Japan. His first book, I'm Going to Be Famous, was published with Holiday House in 1986. He has since published over 20 books for children, including fiction, nonfiction, and children's books.

The American Library Association has included his 2003 novel Attack of the Mutant Underwear on their list of "Frequently Challenged Children's Books".

== Personal life ==
Birdseye married Debbie Holsclaw, a fellow educator, on May 18, 1974. The couple have two children.

As of 2026, Birdseye lives with his wife in Corvallis, Oregon.

== Bibliography ==
=== Children's and young adult fiction ===
- I'm Going to Be Famous, Holiday House (New York, NY), 1986.
- Tucker, Holiday House (New York, NY), 1990.
- Just Call Me Stupid, Holiday House (New York, NY), 1993.
- Tarantula Shoes, Holiday House (New York, NY), 1995.
- The Eye of the Stone, Holiday House (New York, NY), 2000.
- Attack of the Mutant Underwear, Holiday House (New York, NY), 2003.
- A Tough Nut to Crack, Holiday House (New York, NY), 2006.
- Storm Mountain, Holiday House (New York, NY), 2010.
- There Is No Map for This, Groundwood Books, 2024.

=== Children's and young adult nonfiction ===
- A Kids' Guide to Building Forts, illustrated by Bill Klein, Harbinger House (Tucson, AZ), 1993.
- What I Believe: Kids Talk about Faith (with Debbie Holsclaw Birdseye), photographs by Robert Crum, Holiday House (New York, NY), 1996.
- Under Our Skin: Kids Talk about Race (with Debbie Holsclaw Birdseye), photographs by Robert Crum, Holiday House (New York, NY), 1997.

=== Picture books ===
- Air Mail to the Moon, illustrated by Stephen Gammell, Holiday House (New York, NY), 1988.
- A Song of Stars: An Asian Legend, illustrated by Ju-Hong Chen, Holiday House (New York, NY), 1990.
- Waiting for Baby, illustrated by Loreen Leedy, Holiday House (New York, NY), 1991.
- Soap! Soap! Don't Forget the Soap! An Appalachian Folktale, illustrated by Andrew Glass, Holiday House (New York, NY), 1993.
- A Regular Flood of Mishap, illustrated by Megan Lloyd, Holiday House (New York, NY), 1994.
- She'll Be Comin' Round the Mountain (with Debbie Holsclaw Birdseye), illustrated by Andrew Glass, Holiday House (New York, NY), 1994.
- Look Out, Jack! The Giant Is Back!, illustrated by Will Hillenbrand, Holiday House (New York, NY), 2001.
- Oh Yeah!, illustrated by Ethan Long, Holiday House (New York, NY), 2003.
