= Leikeli47 =

American rapper

- Also known as: Leikeli
- Genre: Hip hop
- Occupations: Rapper; songwriter
- Years active: 2010–present

Leikeli47 (or Leikeli) (Note: Leikeli47 also uses the alias "Hasben Jones", which has been incorrectly reported as her real name.) is an American rapper signed to RCA Records. In 2018, she released her second full-length album, Acrylic. Until 2024, she was known for concealing her face with a bandana or balaclava at all performances and professional appearances.

== Early life ==
Leikeli was raised in both Virginia and New York, primarily in the Virginia and Brooklyn neighborhoods of Danville, Norfolk, Brownsville and Bedford–Stuyvesant. She is of partial Trinidadian and Guyanese descent. She has described herself as having been a shy child who was interested in becoming a rapper from a young age. She cites Michael Jackson and N.E.R.D. as some of her favorite performers.

== Career ==
Prior to being signed to RCA Records, Leikeli released a mixtape in 2010 titled LK-47. This was followed by a string of releases including the sequel mixtape LK-47 Pt. II in 2014 and a self-titled EP in 2015, Leikeli47. In 2015, Leikeli's song "Fuck the Summer Up" was included on Jay-Z's inaugural Tidal self titled playlist.

Leikeli's first full-length debut, Wash & Set, was released on September 8, 2017. It was received positively by critics. Afropunk.com wrote, "the album showcases Leikeli47’s distinctively hard-hitting yet playful lyricism, genre-bending musicianship, and enigmatic character." Darryl Robertson wrote for Vibe, "the dynamic, and featureless, effort is loaded with creativity, vigor and the power of her own feminism. It's evident that Leikeli is aiming to break rules and push boundaries hip-hop."

Acrylic was released on November 15, 2018. The title was inspired by her mixture of southern, Caribbean, and city roots. The first single on the album, "Girl Blunt", was featured on the third season of Insecure and on the first season of The Wilds. The album received positive critical reviews. Jenn Pelly wrote at Pitchfork.com: "Her flow is always gripping, her details novelistic: An aunt sells candy from a windowpane, an extension cord snakes across a hallway, and the lights flicker in an E train tunnel." Dhruva Balram wrote for NME, "At times, and especially on ‘Iron Mike’, Leikeli47 sounds like the best of M.I.A, Cardi B and Kamaiyah rolled into one." Acrylic was named one of NPR's 50 Best Albums of 2018, as well as other lists including Paper Magazine, Esquire, and Forbes. Acrylic is the second part of a planned music trilogy that Leikeli has developed, called the "Beauty Series".

She stated that the next installment to the "Beauty Series" will be called Shape Up. About the theme of beauty salons, she told The Fader, "They're safe havens for all of us — all women, but especially the African-American community. I wanted to create a body of work that spoke to not looking like what you actually are going through." She has stated that she seeks to normalize Black beauty standards, such as decorated fingernails.

Leikeli performed with Pharrell during his I Am Other set at 2017's Complexcon, as well as Natalie Portman's Boston Calling set in 2018, held at Portman's alma mater Harvard University.

Her first headlined tour began in March 2019.

Leikeli47's third album Shape Up was released on May 13, 2022 and received positive reviews. Pitchfork.com gave the album an 8.0 and wrote "The anonymous Brooklyn rapper's third album is a little bolder and a little rawer, but it's her versatility-across hip-hop, ballroom, house, and R&B-that keeps her sound fresh."

In October 2024, Leikeli47 announced her fourth album, Lei Keli ft. 47 / For Promotional Use Only, would be following in the future months. On October 25, 2024, she released 450 as the lead single. The video was shot in black-and-white, and shows Leikeli47 removing her face covering and performing public for the first time. The album was released on 13 June, 2025.

== Personal life ==
Leikeli is known for being private and has not released her legal name or performed without her face covered. In June 2019, she told Cultured Magazine, "Being black, we gotta learn how to wear a mask early." When asked about the meaning to her name in an interview with Snobette, she said that "it’s special to me, but I don’t need to share the reasoning behind it."

According to an interview with Vibe, she conceals her face because "I feel like the Dark Knight, or one of those superheroes, or Superman… the mask, it represents freedom. I'm free with it on."

In 2024, with the release of 450, Leikeli47 removed her face covering. In a press release ahead of her fourth album she stated, "It feels right. It’s time. The mask served its purpose, and now we move forward.”

== Discography ==
=== Studio albums ===
- Wash & Set (2017)
- Acrylic (2018)
- Shape Up (2022)
- Lei Keli ft. 47 / For Promotional Use Only (2025)

=== EPs ===
- Leikeli47 (2015)
- Pick a Color – Acrylic (2018)
- Design – Acrylic (2018)

=== Mixtapes ===
- LK-47 (2010 First / 2012 Final)
- The Flower Shop as Told by Brett Elway (2013)
- LK-47 Pt. II (2014)
- LK-47 Pt. III (2015)
