= Bonzie (musician) =

American singer and songwriter

BONZIE
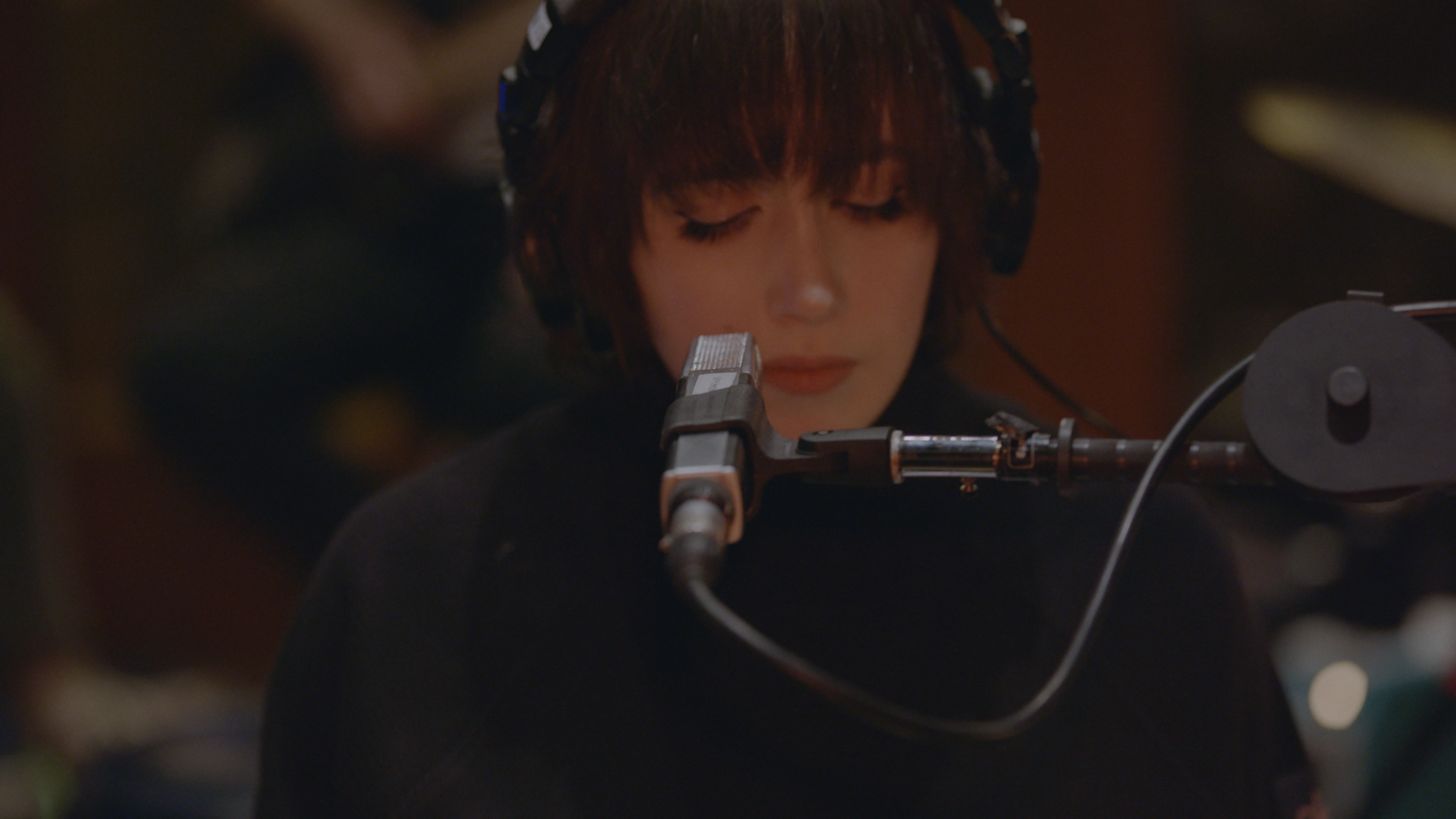
- BONZIE in 2023

Background information
- Born: Nina Ferraro; Racine, Wisconsin
- Genres: Alternative; Art pop; Indie rock
- Occupations: Singer; songwriter; record producer
- Instruments: Vocals, guitar, piano, keyboard, bass, accordion
- Years active: 2009–present
- Label: Beevine Records (Independent)
- Website: www.bonzie.net

Nina Ferraro, known professionally as BONZIE, is an American singer-songwriter and musician.

== Early life ==
Nina Ferraro was born in Racine, Wisconsin. She was born into a non-musical family and started writing songs at the age of 10, after teaching herself the guitar. She wrote songs in secret as she was discouraged from pursuing it.

Ferraro went to high school in Chicago, Illinois, where she started performing with her band in the Chicago live venue circuit, eventually adopting the pseudonym “BONZIE” to release her songs under. Upon graduating high school, she attended DePaul University and Lake Forest College studying Literature and Poetry. She is fluent in Japanese and has released music in Japanese as well.

== Career ==
=== Early career ===
In the year 2010 at age 15, Nina Ferraro released her debut EP, The Promise, and began using the stage name BONZIE shortly thereafter. In a 2013 interview with the Chicago Tribune, she explained her decision: "BONZIE feels a lot better to go under, not only because it's a pseudonym, but also because it doesn't subscribe to a language. There isn't a conventional definition of BONZIE, and it's more something where I can become its meaning."

BONZIE wrote and co-produced her first full-length album, Rift into The Secret Of Things, which was released in August 2013 at age 17. It was preceded by the single "Data Blockers," which premiered on Spin.com, It was followed by a second single "Felix," which features The Milk Carton Kids' Joey Ryan and Kenneth Pattengale. The album's title was inspired by a passage from Henry David Thoreau's Walden.

In 2016, BONZIE released a double single, "As The Surface Rose" via Under The Radar, who said it "conjures an emotive vacuum where BONZIE's voice and piano keys hover and haunt." The New York Times featured the music video for "As The Surface Rose" shortly after its release, where chief music critic Jon Pareles writes, "This song is an ambitious interlude, a statement of commitment..." "As The Surface Rose" was backed by a lyric-free B-side,"Half Full."

This was soon followed by another double single in 2016, entitled "How Do You Find Yourself, Love?," a 7" vinyl that premiered on BrooklynVegan. The live-to-track, "How Do You Find Yourself, Love?," was recorded by Steve Albini, and includes instrumental B-side "Back to an Insurmountable wall", which was produced and performed by BONZIE, and recorded by Tortoise member John McEntire.

=== Zone on Nine and Reincarnation ===
BONZIE released the second full-length album called Zone on Nine in May 2017. The album was fully written and produced by Ferraro herself, and co-produced with Jonathan Wilson (Father John Misty, Conor Oberst) and Ali Chant (Perfume Genius, Youth Lagoon).

The album was released to critical acclaim, namely two front-page articles in the Chicago Tribune by the music critic Greg Kot who called Zone on Nine "stunning". Kot also wrote "BONZIE has shown a consistent refusal to be pinned down to a genre or simplified descriptions of the kind of music she makes." Other reviews for Zone on Nine included VICE who wrote that it had a "gorgeous sonic palette that's hard to pinpoint but instantly alluring".

In September 2020, BONZIE released a single and animated music video for a song entitled "alone". It was written by BONZIE and co-produced with DJ Camper. NPR's All Songs Considered premiered the track, writing "brilliantly talented. The atmospherics in this song are stunning." In the All Songs Considered podcast, NPR's Bob Boilen also announced a forthcoming full-length album. The music video for "alone" was animated by Japanese hand-paint artist Miyo Sato. The New York Times named it one of the Best Songs of 2020.

The third full-length album entitled Reincarnation was released in March 2021. In a feature long-form article in The New York Times, Jon Pareles wrote "It would be the continuation of a fully independent career that has consistently yielded richly melodic and mysterious songs."

=== 2023-Present ===
In December 2023, BONZIE released her first single since 2021 called, “Spiritual Violence.” The new single was followed by “Citrus,” which was released January 24, 2024. In March 2024, BONZIE release an EP titled Live at EastWest, which featured two live recordings of her recent single “Spiritual Violence” and her 2020 single, “alone.” With the release of Live at EastWest, BONZIE teased her fourth album would be released in 2024.

When I Found The Trap Door

In October of 2024 BONZIE released her first fully self-produced LP entitled When I Found The Trap Door. "The Point Of No Return" from When I Found The Trap Door was featured by The New York Times on its series "The Playlist" on the album's release day.

== Discography ==
=== Albums ===
- Rift into The Secret Of Things, 2013
- Zone on Nine, 2017
- Reincarnation, 2021
- When I Found The Trap Door, 2024

=== Extended plays ===
- The Promise, 2010
- Live at EastWest, 2024

=== Singles ===
- Let It Go, 2009
- Data Blockers, 2013
- Felix, 2013
- As The Surface Rose, 2016
- How Do You Find Yourself, Love?, 2016
- Fading Out, 2017
- Combback, 2017
- alone, 2020
- Lethal, 2020
- Spiritual Violence, 2023
- Mortal Eye, 2023
- Citrus, 2024
- The Point Of No Return, 2024
- Do You Know Who I Am, 2024
