= Tony Rich =

American singer-songwriter

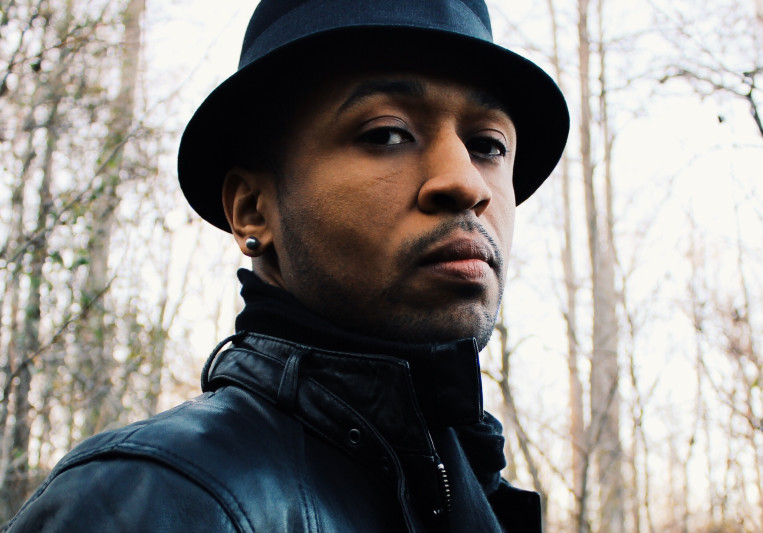
- Tony Rich in 2011

Background information
- Also known as: The Tony Rich Project
- Born: Antonio Jeffries; November 19, 1971 (age 55)
- Origin: Detroit, Michigan, U.S.
- Genre: R&B
- Occupations: Singer, songwriter, guitarist, keyboardist, record producer
- Instruments: Vocals, guitar, keyboards
- Years active: 1993–present
- Labels: Francis-Lyn, LLC, Rich Media
- Website: thetonyrich.com

Antonio Jeffries (born November 19, 1971), better known as Tony Rich and The Tony Rich Project, is an American Grammy Award-winning R&B singer-songwriter best known for his 1995 hit single "Nobody Knows".

== Early career ==
Rich was born in Detroit, Michigan, United States, and first attracted attention of John Salley of the then Detroit Pistons. Upon working at Salley's Detroit recording studio, Hoop Sounds, Tony was introduced to the production team of Tim & Bob. The duo was in transit to Atlanta to work with Dallas Austin and promised that they would connect Tony once they were there. They told Perri "Pebbles" Reid (then the wife of L.A. Reid, co-founder of LaFace Records) to listen to one of Rich's songs over the phone. Pebble then suggested that Rich work with her husband L.A Reid and was subsequently hired as a house songwriter for LaFace Records, penning hit singles for artists such as Toni Braxton, Boyz II Men, Elton John, A Few Good Men and Johnny Gill. As incoming Vice President of A&R, Eddie F then convinced L.A. Reid to sign him as an artist. Later, Rich mixed elements of jazz, rock country and soul into his tracks.

== The Tony Rich Project ==
After signing with LaFace Records as an artist, Rich began work on his debut album. The set's lead single "Nobody Knows" was released in November 1995, and became a hit single, making it to No. 2 on the Billboard Hot 100 the following year. Under the moniker "The Tony Rich Project," he released his debut album Words in early 1996. Both the album and single went platinum. The album's follow-up single "Like a Woman" garnered moderate success giving Rich another Top30 AC single. He also contributed the track "Highway" to the soundtrack to the 1996 action film Fled and "You're a Winner" to the Rhythm of the Games: 1996 Olympic Games Album compilation.

The following year, Rich received four Grammy Award nominations including Best New Artist, Best Male Pop Vocal Performance ("Nobody Knows"), Best R&B Album ("Words"), and Best Male R&B Vocal Performance ("Like a Woman"), winning the award for Best R&B Album.

A third single, "Leavin'" was released in 1997 from his debut album and peaked at No. 88 on the Hot 100 and No. 53 on the R&B chart. Also that year, he did some songwriting/production work on albums by Sam Salter, Michael Bolton, 4.0, and Aaron Neville.

He made his feature film debut, portraying Duke Ellington in the 1997 crime drama Hoodlum. He recorded the track "Harlem is Home" for the movie soundtrack.

After the success of his debut, Rich began work on his next album. The album's first single "Silly Man" was released in 1998 and gained some airplay. His second album Birdseye was released on August 8, 1998, and peaked at No. 66 on the Billboard R&B chart. It was critically praised, but failed to generate much commercial success. Due to some label issues/mergers, his album was caught in limbo. That same year, he was commissioned to produce a few remixes for the Spice Girls hit single "Viva Forever" in addition to doing some appearances/production work on albums by CeCe Winans and Eric Clapton.

With his Birdseye album's cycle cut short, he took some time off to work on various projects.

In 1999, he recorded a remake of the classic song "If This World Were Mine" with Grenique for the Marvin is 60 compilation tribute album. For the next few years, he would write and compose songs for a couple of gospel artists such as Anointed and The Wordd. He also contributed a few tracks to the Guy reunion album Guy III of which "Why You Wanna Keep Me from My Baby" was released as a single and peaked at No. 50 on the R&B charts.

In 2003, Rich returned with his third album Resurrected which marked his first release as an independent artist. Carrying a very different styles, the album featured Rich influenced by Rock music, focusing on his guitar work, in addition to various styles of music. The set's lead single "Traveling Alone" became an Urban AC hit and also became a huge hit in the Brazilian market as covered by the artist Luisa Possi and the album had a follow-up single with the track "Red Wine."

In 2006, Rich released his fourth album, Pictures which featured the theme of snapshots of a relationship. It garnered a positive response from his fans, who marked the return to a R&B-focused genre than his previous release.

In 2007, he signed with Hidden Beach Recordings, and began work on his fifth solo album Exist. The first single from the album "Part the Waves" was released as a digital single, and the album soon followed on September 23, 2008.

Following the promotion of the album with some tour dates and televised performances, his album track "Sweet Addiction" was featured on Hidden Beach Recordings' Hidden Beach Valentines Vol. 1: Love, Passion & Other Emotions compilation.

In 2009, he began preparations to release a new studio album titled Speak Me with Hidden Beach Recordings. However, it wasn't until 2013 that the album was then scheduled to be released on March 19, 2013. The album's lead single "Fade Away" was pushed to Smooth Jazz / Smooth AC radio. The album was later pushed back to a summer release but eventually shelved. However, snippets of the album were made available through Hidden Beach Recordings' SoundCloud account.

The latest release from The Tony Rich Project is Encaustic, released in October 2017.

== Discography ==
=== Albums ===
| Year | Album details | Peak chart positions | | | | Certifications (sales threshold) |
| Year | Album details | US | US R&B | AUS | UK | Certifications (sales threshold) |
|---|---|---|---|---|---|---|
| Words | Released: January 16, 1996; Label: LaFace | 31 | 18 | 31 | 27 | RIAA: Platinum; BPI: Silver |
| Birdseye | Released: August 8, 1998; Label: LaFace | — | 66 | — | — | |
| Resurrected | Released: July 15, 2003; Label: Rich Projects / Compendia | — | — | — | — | |
| Pictures | Released: May 2, 2006; Label: Rich Media / I.M. | — | — | — | — | |
| A New Understanding of Peace (with Shelia Evans) | Released: December 5, 2006; Label: Sefat Mustard Seed Productions | — | — | — | — | |
| Exist | Released: September 23, 2008; Label: Hidden Beach | — | 31 | — | — | |
| Encaustic | Released: October 26, 2017; Label: Francis-Lyn | — | — | — | — | |

=== Compilations ===
| Year | Album details |
|---|---|
| Nobody Knows: The Best Of | Released: April 26, 2005; Label: Sony BMG |

=== Singles ===
| Year | Single | Peak chart positions | | | | | | | | Certifications |
| Year | Single | US | US AC | US R&B | US Pop | US Adult Pop | US Rhy. | AUS | UK | Certifications |
|---|---|---|---|---|---|---|---|---|---|---|
| 1995 | "Nobody Knows" | 2 | 2 | 11 | 2 | 7 | 1 | 2 | 4 | RIAA: Platinum; ARIA: Gold; BPI: Silver |
| 1996 | "Like a Woman" | 41 | 30 | 42 | 28 | — | 24 | 71 | 27 | |
| 1997 | "Leavin'" | 88 | 53 | — | — | — | — | — | 52 | |
| 1998 | "Silly Man" | — | — | — | — | — | — | — | — | |
| 2003 | "Traveling Alone" | — | — | — | — | — | — | — | — | |
| 2003 | "Red Wine" | — | — | — | — | — | — | — | — | |
| 2008 | "Part the Waves" | — | — | — | — | — | — | — | — | |
| 2013 | "Fade Away" | — | — | — | — | — | — | — | — | |
| 2013 | "Breaking Glass" | — | — | — | — | — | — | — | — | |
