= Birdseye (Tony Rich album) =

Studio album by Tony Rich
- Released: 1998
- Genre: R&B
- Labels: LaFace, Arista
- Producer: Tony Rich

Tony Rich chronology
Words (1996)	Birdseye (1998)	Resurrected (2003)

Birdseye is the second album by the American musician Tony Rich (credited to the Tony Rich Project), released in 1998. "Silly Man" was the album's first single.

== Production ==
The album's songs were written by Tony Rich. It was produced by Rich, with additional production by Babyface and L.A. Reid. Rich played all of the instruments, aside from some uncredited guitar parts played by Eric Clapton.

== Critical reception ==
Professional ratings
Review scores
Source	Rating
AllMusic	4/5 stars
The Atlanta Journal-Constitution	B+
Calgary Herald	3/5 stars
Robert Christgau	(dud)
Los Angeles Times	2.5/4 stars
USA Today	3.5/4 stars

The Washington Post noted that "Rich downplays drums and hard beats in favor of insinuating melodies, replaces the contemporary emphasis on lust with old-fashioned romantic notions, and sings softly in a lithe, silky tenor reminiscent of his friend (and co-executive producer) Babyface." The New York Times called the album "a soundtrack for seducers who can't stop thinking about the awkwardness of the morning after."

The Los Angeles Times concluded that "after a while, this procession of soothing, slow-to mid-tempo numbers can seem a bit staid and monotonous." Newsday deemed the album "a short, thin recording that feels like a rush job." The Atlanta Journal-Constitution called it "a beautiful testament to Rich's musical and lyrical growth." The Chicago Tribune opined that "Rich's greatest virtue is his understatedness; he makes mood music that is more spiritual than sexual ... But though his silky melodies are insinuating and his lyrics well-intentioned, Rich is still grasping for identity."

AllMusic wrote that "Birdseye remains a remarkably romantic record, one of the rare albums whose seduction feels genuine, not prepackaged."

== Track listing ==
1. "Birdseye" – 4:59
2. "Silly Man" – 3:42
3. "No Time Soon" – 3:40
4. "If You're an Angel" – 3:40
5. "Bed" – 4:16
6. "Cool Like That" – 3:25
7. "Thoughts of Leavin'" – 4:14
8. "My Stomach Hurts" – 4:19
9. "Blue Butterfly" – 4:46
10. "Ain't No Laughing" – 4:09
