= Shape Up (album) =

Studio album by Leikeli47
- Released: May 13, 2022
- Genre: Hip hop
- Length: 44:12
- Label: RCA
- Producer: Michael Barney; Clyde; Dave Hamelin; Harry; Osinachi Nwaneri; Jabbar Stevens; Gavin Williams

Leikeli47 chronology
Acrylic (2018)	Shape Up (2022)

Shape Up is a 2022 studio album by American rapper Leikeli47. The third and final release in her concept album trilogy based around beauty, it has received positive reviews from critics.

== Reception ==
Editors of AllMusic Guide rated this release 4.5 out of five stars and included it in their Best of 2022 listing, with critic Heather Phares writing that it is "stylishly strong" and it successfully builds upon her previous two albums. Shape Up was ranked 29 on the top 50 albums of 2022 on Anthony Fantano's The Needle Drop and he considers this album realizing the unique potential of Leikeli47's songwriting that was hinted at in earlier work, and pairs novelty songs with a strong flow. Dylan Green of Pitchfork rated Shape Up an eight out of 10, opining that "her songs fuse stark confidence and raw vulnerability, unconcerned with how they scrape up against each other"; the publishers included it as one of the 39 best albums of the year in June 2022. Alan Ranta of Exclaim! gave this album nine out of 10 for "an impressively organic flow considering how the record swings between extremes, so massive and varied instrumentally with moments of slick braggadocio, unflinching humour and staggering vulnerability". Precious Fondren of HipHopDX rated this album a 3.5 out of five, writing that the rapper is "adaptable" and that "her verses are top tier, her choruses ring a bit hollow in comparison" and highlighting many good tracks, but critiquing that "a load of the songs on Shape Up feature hooks that lack impact".

== Track listing ==
Shape Up track listing
No.	Title	Writer(s)	Producer(s)	Length
1.	"Chitty Bang"	Hasben Jones; Michael Barney; Harold Lilly	Barney	2:26
2.	"Secret Service"	Jones; Lilly; Jabbar Stevens	Stevens	3:16
3.	"New Money"	Jones; Aaron Renner; Stevens	Stevens	3:08
4.	"LL Cool J"	Jones; Barney; Lilly; Stevens	Barney; Stevens	3:33
5.	"Zoom"	Jones; Lilly; Osinachi Nwaneri; Stevens	Stevens	2:50
6.	"Done Right"	Jones; Barney; Clyde Ellison; Dave Hamelin; Lilly; Harry Mejias	Barney	3:24
7.	"Free to Love"	Jones; Paul Alade; Ukachukwu Anokaura; Hamelin; Mike Meme	Hamelin	2:44
8.	"BITM"	Jones; Barney; George Kranz	Barney	3:09
9.	"Baseball"	Jones; Barney; Don Cannon; Lamar Edwards; Ellison; Lilly; Mejias; Herscholt Polk; Doramus Roberts; Homer Talbert	Barney	3:35
10.	"Carry Anne"	Jones; Barney; Nwaneri	Barney; Nwaneri	3:33
11.	"Jay Walk" (featuring Miss J. Alexander)	Jones; Barney	Barney	2:37
12.	"Hold My Hand"	Jones; Lilly; Gavin Williams	Williams	4:33
13.	"Get the Riches"	Jones; Barney; Lilly	Barney	2:47
14.	"Instant Classic" (bonus track)	Jones; Ellison; Lilly; Mejias	Clyde; Harry	2:37

== Personnel ==
Credits adapted from Tidal.

- Leikeli47 – vocals
- Neal H Pogue – mixing
- Mike Bozzi – mastering
- Michael Barney – engineering
- MeMiceElf – engineering assistance

== See also ==
- Lists of 2022 albums
