= Acrylic (album) =

Studio album by Leikeli47
- Released: November 15, 2018
- Genre: Hip hop
- Length: 50:25
- Language: English
- Label: RCA
- Producer: TWhy Xclusive

Leikeli47 chronology
Wash & Set (2017)	Acrylic (2018)	Shape Up (2022)

Acrylic is a 2018 studio album by American rapper Leikeli47. The second of three releases in her concept album trilogy based around beauty, it has received positive reviews from critics.

== Reception ==
Editors at AllMusic Guide rated this release four out of five stars, with critic Heather Phares praising this album for taking Leikeli47's "music in harder, more reflective, and more satisfying directions". Dhruva Balram of NME gave Acrylic four out of five stars, summing up that the music "dovetails beautifully in and out of vulnerability and confidence; the strength of ‘Acrylic’ lies in this duality". Jenn Pelly of Pitchfork Media rated Acrylic 7.6 out of 10 and opining that with this release, Leikeli47 is "becoming a resounding voice of black womanhood"; the publishers also put this on their list of the best rap albums of 2018.

== Track listing ==
1. "Walk-Ins Welcome" – 1:52
2. "Acrylic" – 2:58
3. "Tic Boom" – 2:54
4. "No Reload" – 3:09
5. "Post That" – 2:55
6. "Let's Go Get Stoned (Portier's Vibe)" – 1:09
7. "Girl Blunt" – 3:25
8. "Roll Call" – 3:27
9. "Kid Chocolate Radio" – 1:02
10. "Top Down" – 3:53
11. "Hoyt and Schermerhorn" – 3:30
12. "Iron Mike" – 3:02
13. "Droppin'" – 3:40
14. "85 South" – 0:31
15. "Ciaa" – 3:26
16. "Talkin' to Myself" – 1:36
17. "Bad Gyal Flex" – 2:49
18. "Full Set (A New Style)" – 3:07
19. "In My Eyes" – 2:07

== See also ==
- List of 2018 albums
