= John Paris =

American musician

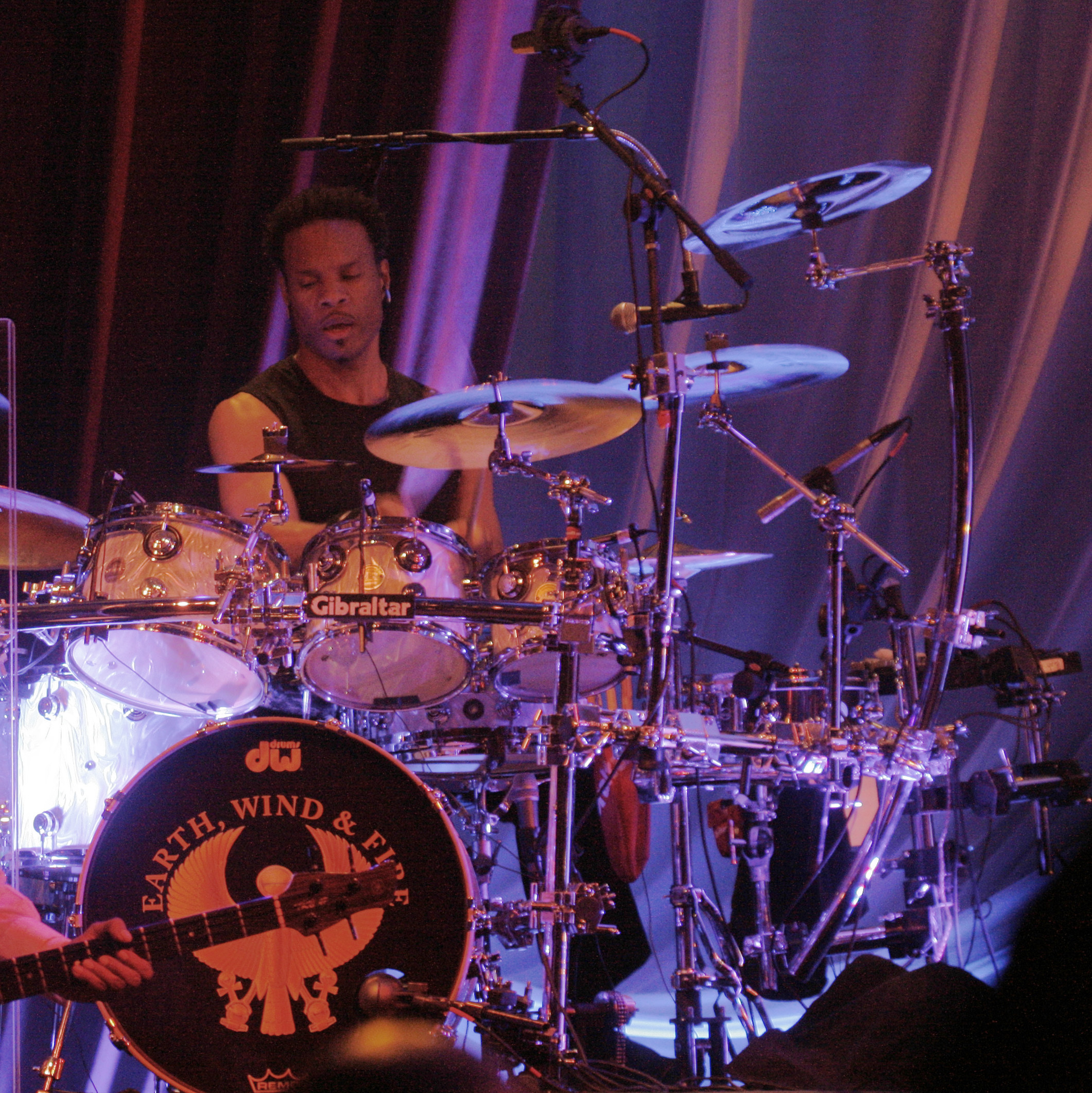
- Paris drumming with Earth, Wind, & Fire in 2010

Background information
- Born: Trenton, New Jersey, U.S.
- Occupations: Musician, arranger, producer, singer, and songwriter
- Instrument: Drums
- Years active: 1987–present
- Member of: Earth, Wind & Fire

John Paris is an American musician, best known as the drummer for Earth, Wind & Fire. Paris has also worked with artists such as Sheila E, Stephanie Mills, Patti LaBelle, Wayman Tisdale, Mica Paris and Kelly Clarkson.

== Early life ==
John Paris was born in Trenton, New Jersey, into a musically inclined family. His mother was a musician and jazz singer, and his father was a big band leader and singer. Paris began playing drums at a young age. During his early teens, he relocated to San Francisco and later to Oakland, California, where he became involved in the local music scene.

== Career ==
Paris firstly toured with Sheila E. and later performed on Stephanie Mills' 1987 album If I Were Your Woman. He then played the drums on Patti LaBelle's 1991 album Burnin', 1992 album Live and Philip Bailey's 1994 self titled album. Paris also appeared on Bruce Hornsby's 1995 LP Hot House, Wayman Tisdale's 1995 album Power Forward and the Dazz Band's 1997 LP Double Exposure. What's more, he played on Wayman Tisdale's 1998 album Decisions, Mica Paris' 1998 album Black Angel and Kelly Clarkson's 2017 album Meaning of Life.

In 2001, Paris joined Earth, Wind & Fire as their drummer. Paris has since performed on the band's 2003 studio album The Promise, 2005's Illumination, 2013's Now, Then & Forever and 2014's Holiday. Paris is also a member of the American music duo Back 2 Basics, which he formed with saxophonist Eddie Mininfield.

On August 6, 2026, Earth, Wind & Fire postponed its San Francisco show after Paris suffered a cardiac incident and was rushed to the hospital, where he was listed as in critical condition.

== Discography ==
=== Credits ===
- Stephanie Mills - If I Were Your Woman - Drums (1987)
- Jesse Johnson - Every Shade of Love - Drums, Percussion (1988)
- Patti LaBelle - Burnin' - Drums (1991)
- Patti LaBelle - Live - Drums (1992)
- Philip Bailey - Philip Bailey - Co-producer, Drums (1994)
- Bruce Hornsby - Hot House (1995)
- Wayman Tisdale - Power Forward - Drums (1995)
- Dazz Band - Double Exposure - Drums (1997)
- Wayman Tisdale - Decisions - Drums (1998)
- Mica Paris - Black Angel - Drums (1998)
- Earth, Wind & Fire - The Promise - Drums (2003)
- Earth, Wind & Fire - Illumination - Drums (2005)
- Earth, Wind & Fire - Now, Then & Forever - Drums (2013)
- Kelly Clarkson - Meaning of Life - Drums (2017)
