= Birds Eye Peak =

Mountain in Alaska, United States

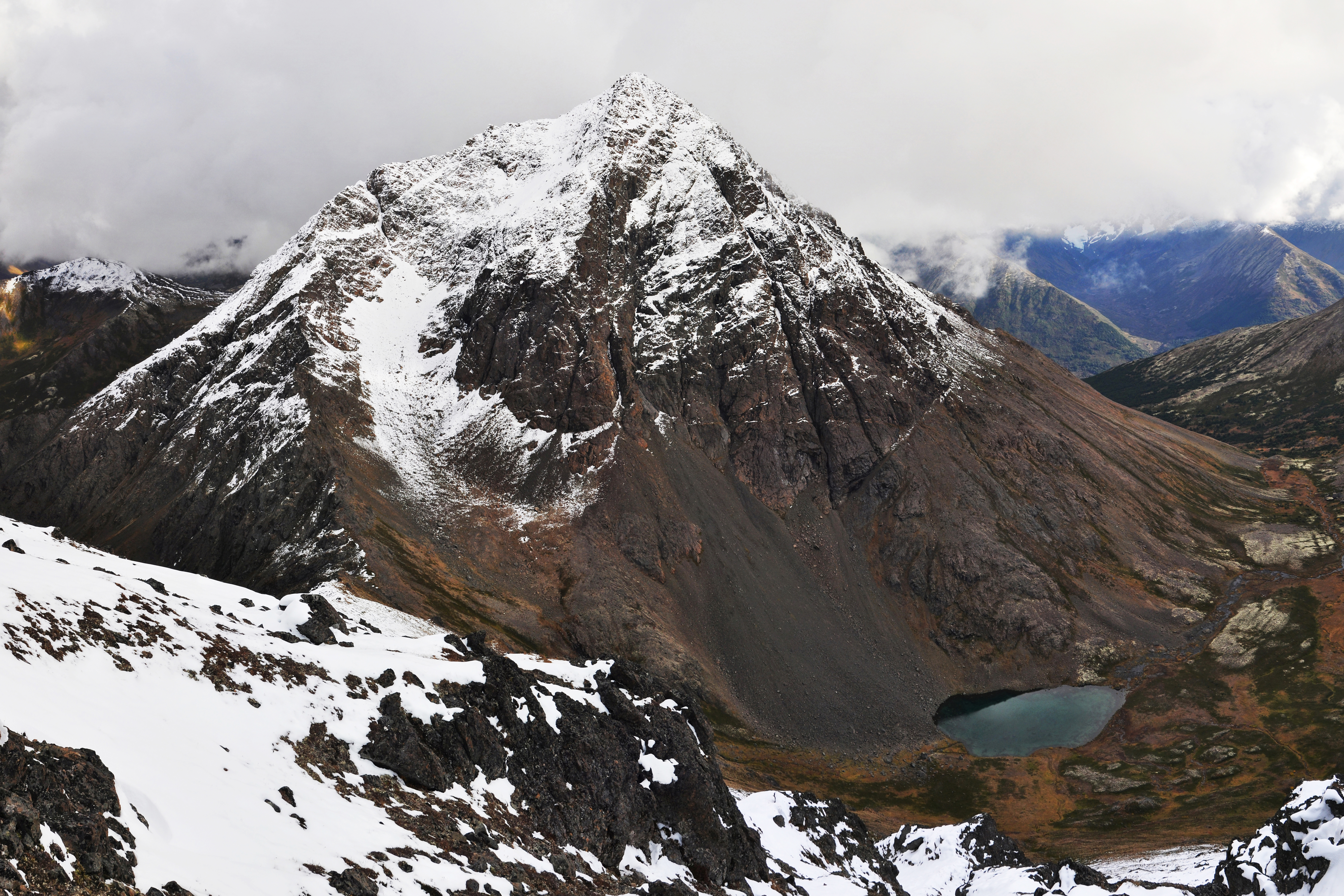
- West aspect

Highest point
- Elevation: 4,970 ft (1,515 m)
- Prominence: 2,608 ft (795 m)
- Parent peak: Avalanche Mountain (5,050 ft)
- Isolation: 3.60 mi (5.79 km)
- Listing: Chugach State Park 120
- Coordinates: 61°04′38″N 149°23′33″W

Geography
- Location within Alaska
- Interactive map of Birds Eye Peak
- Location: Municipality of Anchorage
- Country: United States
- State: Alaska
- Protected area: Chugach State Park
- Parent range: Chugach Mountains
- Topo map: USGS Anchorage A-7

Climbing
- Easiest route: Scrambling class 3

Birds Eye Peak is a 4,970-foot-elevation (1,515-meter) mountain summit in the U.S. state of Alaska. This mountain is located 15 miles (24 km) southeast of Anchorage in the Chugach Mountains and Chugach State Park. Precipitation runoff from the mountain drains north to Knik Arm via Ship Creek and south to Turnagain Arm via Bird Creek. Topographic relief is significant as the summit rises 3,970 feet (1,210 m) above Bird Creek in less than two miles (3.2 km). This mountain's toponym has not been officially adopted by the U.S. Board on Geographic Names.

== Climate ==
Based on the Köppen climate classification, Birds Eye Peak is located in a subarctic climate zone with long, cold, snowy winters, and cool summers. Weather systems coming off the Gulf of Alaska are forced upwards by the Chugach Mountains (orographic lift), causing heavy precipitation in the form of rainfall and snowfall. Winter temperatures can drop below −10 °F with wind chill factors below −20 °F. The months May through June offer the most favorable weather for climbing or viewing.

== Gallery ==
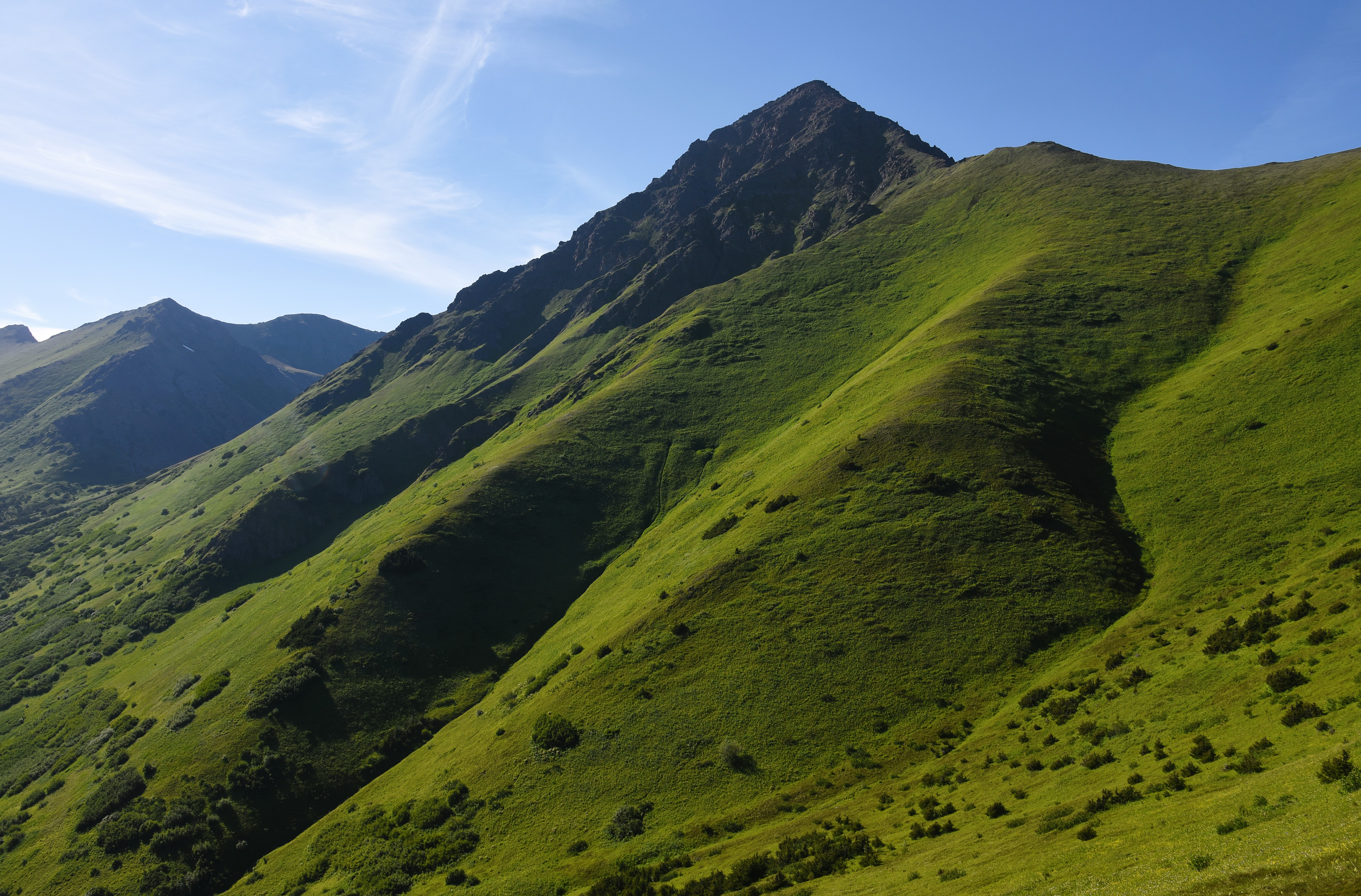
East aspect

== See also ==
- List of mountain peaks of Alaska
- Geography of Alaska
