= American Idols Live! Tour 2004 =

2004 summer concert tour

- Tour by American Idol Finalists
- Promotional poster for the tour
- Start date: July 14, 2004
- End date: October 5, 2004
- No. of shows: 49 in North America; 1 in Asia; 50 total

American Idol Finalists concert chronology
- American Idols Live! Tour 2003 (2003); American Idols Live! Tour 2004 (2004); American Idols Live! Tour 2005 (2005)

American Idols Live! Tour 2004 was a summer and fall concert tour featuring the Top 10 contestants of the third season of American Idol, which aired in 2004. The tour was sponsored by Kellogg's Pop-Tarts. It was the third in the series the American Idols Tour.

== Background ==
The tour started in Salt Lake City on July 14, 2004. Initially, 48 tour dates were planned, but two shows (Ames, Iowa and Fargo, North Dakota) were cancelled due to poor sales. and three shows were later added in Honolulu in response to demand from fans of Jasmine Trias and Camile Velasco, as well as one final show in Singapore.

Despite having three sell-out shows in Hawaii, the attendances for most of the shows were significantly lower than the first two tours. Average number of tickets sold fell by 40% compared to Season 1 and 48% compared to Season 2. Excluding Singapore, a total of 258,577 tickets were sold, grossing $11,400,424 according to Billboard.

== Performers ==
Top 10 Finalists
Fantasia Barrino (winner)	Diana DeGarmo (2nd place)
Jasmine Trias (3rd place)	LaToya London (4th place)
George Huff (5th place)	John Stevens (6th place)
Jennifer Hudson (7th place)	Jon Peter Lewis (8th place)
Camile Velasco (9th place)	Amy Adams (10th place)

== Opening act ==
- Tamyra Gray (North America, select dates)
- Joy Tobing (Kallang)

== Setlist ==
1. "Knock on Wood" (Adams)
2. "Ex-Factor" (Velasco)
3. "Superstition" (Lewis)
4. "(Sweet Sweet Baby) Since You've Been Gone" (Hudson)
5. "Come Fly with Me" (Stevens)
6. "Ain't Too Proud to Beg" (Huff)
7. "My All" (London)
8. "How Will I Know" (Trias)
9. "Dreams" (DeGarmo)
10. "River Deep, Mountain High" (DeGarmo)
11. "Summertime" (Barrino)
12. "Signed, Sealed, Delivered I'm Yours" (Barrino)
13. "When Doves Cry" / "Kiss" / "U Got the Look" / "Diamonds and Pearls" / "Baby I'm a Star" / "Nothing Compares 2 U" / "Purple Rain"
14. "Old Time Rock and Roll" (DeGarmo)
15. "My Funny Valentine" (Stevens)
16. "Crazy Little Thing Called Love" (Barrino, Stevens)
17. "A Fool in Love" (Barrino)
18. "I Heard It Through the Grapevine" (DeGarmo, Huff, Lewis, Stevens)
19. "If I Ain't Got You" (Trias)
20. "Dangerously in Love" (Adams, London, Hudson)
21. "Heartburn" (Adams, Barrino, DeGarmo, Hudson, London, Trias, Velasco)
22. "Hey Ya!" (Lewis)
23. "What's Going On" (Huff)
24. "I Believe in a Thing Called Love" (Huff)
25. "All My Life" (Barrino, Huff)
26. "Where Is the Love?"
27. "Hollywood Swinging"
28. "Soul Man" (Huff, Lewis, Stevens)
29. "Crazy In Love" (Adams, Barrino, DeGarmo, Hudson, London, Trias, Velasco)
30. "I Believe" (Barrino)
31. "His Eye Is on the Sparrow" (DeGarmo)
32. "Ain't No Mountain High Enough"

== Tour dates ==
Date	City	Country	Venue	Attendance	Revenue
North America
July 14, 2004	Salt Lake City	United States	Delta Center	—N/a	—N/a
July 16, 2004	Portland	United States	Rose Garden	—N/a	—N/a
July 17, 2004	Everett	United States	Everett Events Center	—N/a	—N/a
July 21, 2004	Saint Paul	United States	Xcel Energy Center	—N/a	—N/a
July 22, 2004	Milwaukee	United States	Bradley Center	—N/a	—N/a
July 25, 2004	Moline	United States	The MARK of the Quad Cities	—N/a	—N/a
July 27, 2004	Grand Rapids	United States	Van Andel Arena	—N/a	—N/a
July 28, 2004	Detroit	United States	Joe Louis Arena	—N/a	—N/a
July 29, 2004	Cleveland	United States	CSU Convocation Center	—N/a	—N/a
July 31, 2004	Columbus	United States	Value City Arena	—N/a	—N/a
August 1, 2004	Indianapolis	United States	Conseco Fieldhouse	—N/a	—N/a
August 3, 2004	Evansville	United States	Roberts Municipal Stadium	—N/a	—N/a
August 4, 2004	Cincinnati	United States	U.S. Bank Arena	—N/a	—N/a
August 5, 2004	Chicago	United States	United Center	—N/a	—N/a
August 7, 2004	Omaha	United States	Qwest Center Arena	—N/a	—N/a
August 10, 2004	Grand Prairie	United States	Nokia Live	—N/a	—N/a
August 11, 2004	New Orleans	United States	New Orleans Arena	—N/a	—N/a
August 13, 2004	North Little Rock	United States	Alltel Arena	—N/a	—N/a
August 14, 2004	Nashville	United States	Gaylord Entertainment Center	—N/a	—N/a
August 15, 2004	Atlanta	United States	Philips Arena	—N/a	—N/a
August 17, 2004	Sunrise	United States	Office Depot Center	—N/a	—N/a
August 18, 2004	Jacksonville	United States	Jacksonville Veterans Memorial Arena	—N/a	—N/a
August 20, 2004	Columbia	United States	Colonial Center	—N/a	—N/a
August 21, 2004	Winston-Salem	United States	LJVM Coliseum	—N/a	—N/a
August 22, 2004	Washington, D.C.	United States	MCI Center	—N/a	—N/a
August 24, 2004	Worcester	United States	Worcester's Centrum Centre	—N/a	—N/a
August 27, 2004	Philadelphia	United States	Wachovia Center	—N/a	—N/a
August 28, 2004	Hartford	United States	Hartford Civic Center	—N/a	—N/a
August 29, 2004	East Rutherford	United States	Continental Airlines Arena	10,479 / 13,740	$478,853
August 31, 2004	Uniondale	United States	Nassau Veterans Memorial Coliseum	10,125 / 12,337	$472,810
September 2, 2004	Albany	United States	Pepsi Arena	—N/a	—N/a
September 4, 2004	Wilkes-Barre	United States	Wachovia Arena	—N/a	—N/a
September 5, 2004	Hershey	United States	Giant Center	—N/a	—N/a
September 9, 2004	Pittsburgh	United States	Mellon Arena	—N/a	—N/a
September 10, 2004	Reading	United States	Sovereign Center	—N/a	—N/a
September 11, 2004	Manchester	United States	Verizon Wireless Arena	—N/a	—N/a
September 12, 2004	Providence	United States	Dunkin' Donuts Center	—N/a	—N/a
September 14, 2004	Buffalo	United States	HSBC Arena	—N/a	—N/a
September 15, 2004	Ottawa	Canada	Corel Centre	—N/a	—N/a
September 16, 2004	Toronto	Canada	Air Canada Centre	—N/a	—N/a
September 18, 2004	Green Bay	United States	Resch Center	—N/a	—N/a
September 19, 2004	St. Louis	United States	Savvis Center	—N/a	—N/a
September 23, 2004	Anaheim	United States	Arrowhead Pond	—N/a	—N/a
September 24, 2004	Bakersfield	United States	Centennial Garden	—N/a	—N/a
September 25, 2004	Fresno	United States	Save Mart Center	—N/a	—N/a
September 26, 2004	San Jose	United States	HP Pavilion	7,772 / 12,767	$346,420
September 28, 2004	Honolulu	United States	Blaisdell Arena	18,475 / 18,475	$883,710
September 29, 2004	Honolulu	United States	Blaisdell Arena	18,475 / 18,475	$883,710
September 30, 2004	Honolulu	United States	Blaisdell Arena	18,475 / 18,475	$883,710
Asia
October 5, 2004	Singapore		Singapore Indoor Stadium	—N/a	—N/a
Total				46,851 / 57,319 (82%)	$2,181,793

Cancellations and rescheduled shows

July 20, 2004	Fargo	Fargodome	Cancelled
July 24, 2004	Ames	Hilton Coliseum	Cancelled
