= American Idol Season 3: Greatest Soul Classics =

Compilation album by American Idol Season 3 finalists
- Released: April 27, 2004
- Genres: Pop, Soul
- Label: RCA
- Producers: James McMillan, Evan Rogers, Carl Sturken

American Idol chronology
Season 2: All-Time Classic American Love Songs (2003)	American Idol Season 3: Greatest Soul Classics (2004)	Season 4: The Showstoppers (2005)

American Idol Season 3: Greatest Soul Classics is a soul music compilation that was released on April 27, 2004. It contains one cover song from each of the twelve finalists of the third season of American Idol and one ensemble.

The album debuted at No. 10 on the Nielsen Soundscan album chart and sold 55,300 the first week. It was certified gold on August 4, 2004 for shipment of 500,000, but sold only 266,000 by 2006.

== Track listing ==
1. "Chain of Fools" (Aretha Franklin) – 3:17 Fantasia Barrino
2. "Me and Mrs. Jones" (Billy Paul) –4:35 George Huff
3. "I Heard It Through the Grapevine" (Gladys Knight and the Pips) – 3:23 Diana DeGarmo
4. "If You Don't Know Me By Now" (Harold Melvin & the Blue Notes) – 3:27 LaToya London
5. "Neither One of Us (Wants to Be the First to Say Goodbye)" (Gladys Knight & the Pips) – 4:14 Jennifer Hudson
6. "You Make Me Feel Brand New" (The Stylistics) – 4:35 Amy Adams
7. "(Sittin' On) the Dock of the Bay" (Otis Redding) – 2:58 Matthew Rogers
8. "Midnight Train to Georgia" (Gladys Knight & the Pips) – 3:23 Jasmine Trias
9. "My Girl" (The Temptations) – 3:04 Jon Peter Lewis
10. "Until You Come Back to Me (That's What I'm Gonna Do)" (Aretha Franklin) – 3:34 Camile Velasco
11. "Betcha by Golly, Wow" (The Stylistics) – 3:11 Leah LaBelle
12. "You Are Everything" (The Stylistics) – 2:39 John Stevens
13. "Ain't No Mountain High Enough" (Marvin Gaye & Tammi Terrell) – 2:42 American Idol Season 3 Finalists

== Charts ==
Chart (2004)	Peak position
Singaporean Albums (RIAS)	6
US Billboard 200	10

== Certifications ==
Region	Certification	Certified units/sales
United States (RIAA)	Gold	266,000
