= Leah LaBelle =

American singer (1986–2018)

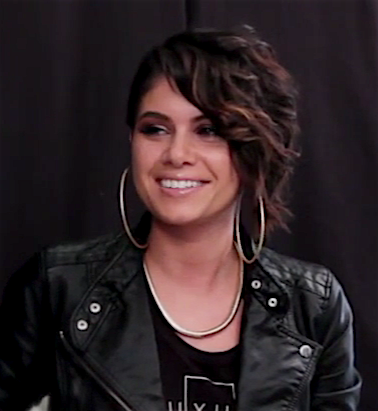
- LaBelle in 2012
- Born: Leah LaBelle Vladowski; September 8, 1986; Toronto, Ontario, Canada
- Died: January 31, 2018 (aged 31); Los Angeles, California, U.S.
- Citizenship: Canada; United States
- Occupation: Singer
- Years active: 2004–2018
- Musical career
- Origin: Seattle, Washington, U.S.
- Genres: Pop; R&B; soul
- Labels: I Am Other; Epic; So So Def
- Website: home.leahlabelle.com

Leah LaBelle Vladowski (September 8, 1986 – January 31, 2018) was an American singer. She rose to prominence in 2004 as a contestant on the third season of American Idol, placing twelfth in the season finals. In 2007, LaBelle began recording covers of R&B and soul music for her YouTube channel. These videos led to work as a backing vocalist starting in 2008 and a record deal in 2011 with Epic in partnership with I Am Other and So So Def Recordings. LaBelle released a sampler, three singles, and a posthumous extended play (EP).

Born in Toronto, Ontario, and raised in Seattle, Washington, LaBelle began pursuing music ambition as a career in her teens. As a child, she performed in the Total Experience Gospel Choir and the musical Black Nativity. In 2005, LaBelle attended the Berklee College of Music for a year before dropping out and relocating to Los Angeles. While in college, she collaborated with Andreao Heard on a demo. Following the advice of an industry contact, LaBelle released her music through her YouTube channel. Keri Hilson hired LaBelle as a backing vocalist after hearing her rendition of "Energy", which led to her working for other artists on their tours.

LaBelle signed a record deal after Pharrell Williams and Jermaine Dupri contacted her. Her sampler Pharrell Williams and Jermaine Dupri Present Leah LaBelle (2012) was distributed only to record companies. It was supported by two singles, "Sexify" and "What Do We Got to Lose?" LaBelle received the Soul Train Centric Award at the 2012 Soul Train Music Awards. She released the non-album single "Lolita" the following year. On January 31, 2018, LaBelle and her boyfriend Rasual Butler died in a single vehicle car crash in Los Angeles, when Butler, under the influence of alcohol and drugs, lost control of the car. A posthumous EP, Love to the Moon, was released on September 7, 2018.

== Life and career ==
=== 1986–2004: Early life and American Idol ===
Leah LaBelle Vladowski was born on September 8, 1986, in Toronto, Ontario, and raised in Seattle, Washington. Her parents, Anastasia and Troshan Vladowski, are Bulgarian singers, and her uncle made rock music in Bulgaria. Anastasia recorded pop music and was in a group with Troshan, who was a founding member of Bulgaria's first rock band, Srebyrnite grivni. After defecting from Bulgaria during a 1979 tour, LaBelle's parents emigrated to Canada and later the United States, becoming naturalized citizens in both countries. LaBelle grew up listening to music, including jazz and the Beatles, but felt the most connected to R&B.

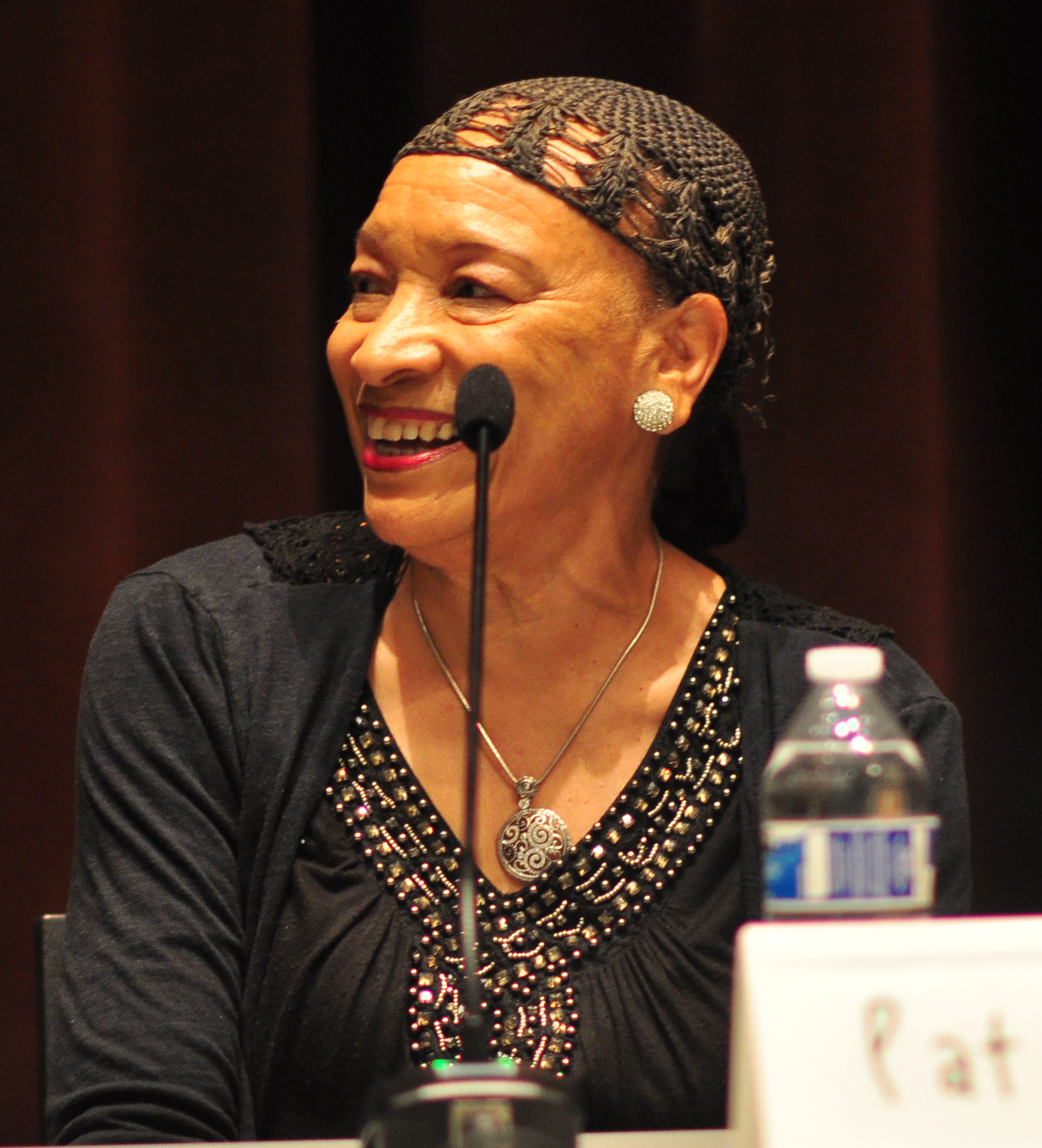
As a teenager, LaBelle performed in the Total Experience Gospel Choir and was mentored by Pat Wright, seen here in 2016.

LaBelle began performing publicly in 1990, including singing on stage during her parents' tours. From age 11, she joined the Total Experience Gospel Choir after being inspired by Lauryn Hill's performance in the 1993 film Sister Act 2: Back in the Habit. LaBelle cited Hill as her primary musical influence. While performing in the choir, she became interested in gospel and soul music. LaBelle also participated in beauty pageants, and in 1997, she won the Washington State Pre-teen Miss America Pageant and was the first runner-up in the National Pageant. A year later, she performed in the musical Black Nativity and remained with the production for five years. During this time, the Total Experience Gospel Choir's founder, Pat Wright, mentored LaBelle. In 2000, she joined the children's show Caught in the Middle and remained part of the program for two years. LaBelle attended Garfield High School, where she performed in a jazz band led by Clarence Acox Jr. After winning the grand prize at KUBE 93.3's Summer Jam Idol in 2002, she performed as the opening act for Summer Jam 20.

At age 17, LaBelle auditioned for the third season of the television show American Idol, and performed Whitney Houston's "I Believe in You and Me". During her appearances on the series, she was a junior in high school. After becoming one of the 32 semi-finalists, LaBelle was eliminated in the top 30 round, but judge Paula Abdul chose her as her "wildcard selection" to advance as one of the 12 finalists. She placed twelfth during the season finals, after performing a cover of the Supremes' "You Keep Me Hangin' On". Looking back on American Idol in a 2016 interview, LaBelle said she was "too young at that time and not developed enough as an artist".

LaBelle covered the Stylistics' "Betcha by Golly, Wow" for the 2004 compilation album American Idol Season 3: Greatest Soul Classics. AllMusic's Heather Phares praised LaBelle as "surprisingly strong and mature", writing that "the studio brings out colors in her voice that she didn't display on-stage". NUVO's Steve Hammer criticized her as "crushing the life" from the original.

American Idol Season 3 performances and results:
Week #	Theme	Song choice	Original artist	Results
Audition	—N/a	"I Believe in You and Me"	Whitney Houston	Advanced
Hollywood	—N/a	"Theme from Mahogany (Do You Know Where You're Going To)"	Diana Ross	Advanced
Hollywood	—N/a	"Young Hearts Run Free"	Candi Staton	Advanced
Top 30	Semi-final/Group 1	"I Have Nothing"	Whitney Houston	Eliminated
Top 30	Wildcard	"Let's Stay Together"	Al Green	Paula Abdul's choice
Top 12	Motown	"You Keep Me Hangin' On"	The Supremes	Eliminated

=== 2004–2010: YouTube and backup singing ===
In 2004, following her elimination from American Idol, LaBelle performed "The Star-Spangled Banner" at a National Football League game and "Lift Every Voice and Sing" during a National Basketball Association game. The same year, she was featured on Lisa Leuschner's cover of "Silent Night" on her Christmas album Sing Me Home, and recorded "Christmas Time" for the charity album Christmas in the Northwest, Vol. 7. After graduating from Garfield High School in 2005, LaBelle attended the Berklee College of Music in Boston. In a 2006 interview with The Seattle Times, she explained she moved away from Seattle to "come into my own world, my own zone and really appreciate me and my music". LaBelle briefly returned to Seattle in 2007 to perform a solo for the tenth anniversary of Black Nativity.

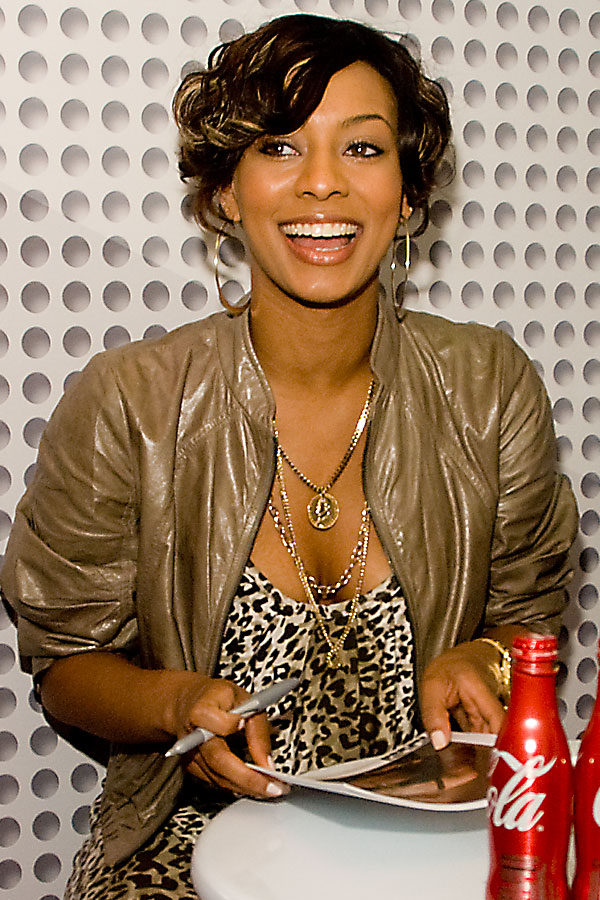
Keri Hilson, pictured here in 2009, became a mentor for LaBelle after hiring her as a backing vocalist.

While attending Berklee College, LaBelle rejected two recording contracts, including one with Andreao Heard, based on her attorney's advice. Her mother said, "the contract they were offering was too binding". Heard became interested in LaBelle after watching a video of her performance in the Total Experience Gospel Choir. She worked with Heard in New York City, and recorded a demo written by Makeba Riddick, which was sent to several record labels. During this time, LaBelle decided to combine R&B and pop music, later explaining: "I want to bring real music back but make it marketable and mainstream. To me real music isn't everything being synthesized, computerized." In a 2018 Billboard article, Heard said "the business side of the industry" prevented him from working further with LaBelle.

LaBelle stayed at Berklee College for one year before moving to Los Angeles at 21 to pursue her music career. Following an industry contact's advice, she created a YouTube channel on December 1, 2007, and gained recognition for her covers of R&B and soul music. In 2018, Vibe's Desire Thompson noted "the early days of YouTube were a blessing to singers like LaBelle".

In 2008 Keri Hilson heard LaBelle's cover of her single "Energy" and hired her as a backing vocalist. LaBelle viewed Hilson as a mentor and said she "brought me along with her and allowed me to see into the industry a little bit deeper than I already have". Her connection with Hilson led to further work as a background singer, and she performed for Robin Thicke, Jordin Sparks, the Jonas Brothers, Britney Spears, and Eric Benét on their respective tours. In March 2008, LaBelle sang at Quincy Jones' 75th birthday party at the Northwest African American Museum. The same year, she was included on American Idol Rewind, and in 2009, she was featured on rapper Kumasi's single "Angel" from his debut studio album The One. When Benét was an opening act in Fantasia's Back to Me Tour, LaBelle was his backing vocalist, and she performed duets with him as a part of his set list.

=== 2011–2018: Record contract ===
LaBelle signed a record deal in 2011 with L.A. Reid's company, Epic Records, in a partnership with Pharrell Williams' I Am Other and Jermaine Dupri's So So Def Recordings. Dupri and Williams became interested in LaBelle after watching her YouTube covers, which led to Dupri contacting her. Like Wright and Hilson had before, they acted as mentors for LaBelle. She first met Williams when she was 17, while backstage at a concert by his band N.E.R.D., and told him he would produce her album one day. On May 1, 2012, LaBelle released the five-track sampler Pharrell Williams and Jermaine Dupri Present Leah LaBelle, which was distributed to record companies. It was also made available on her SoundCloud account.

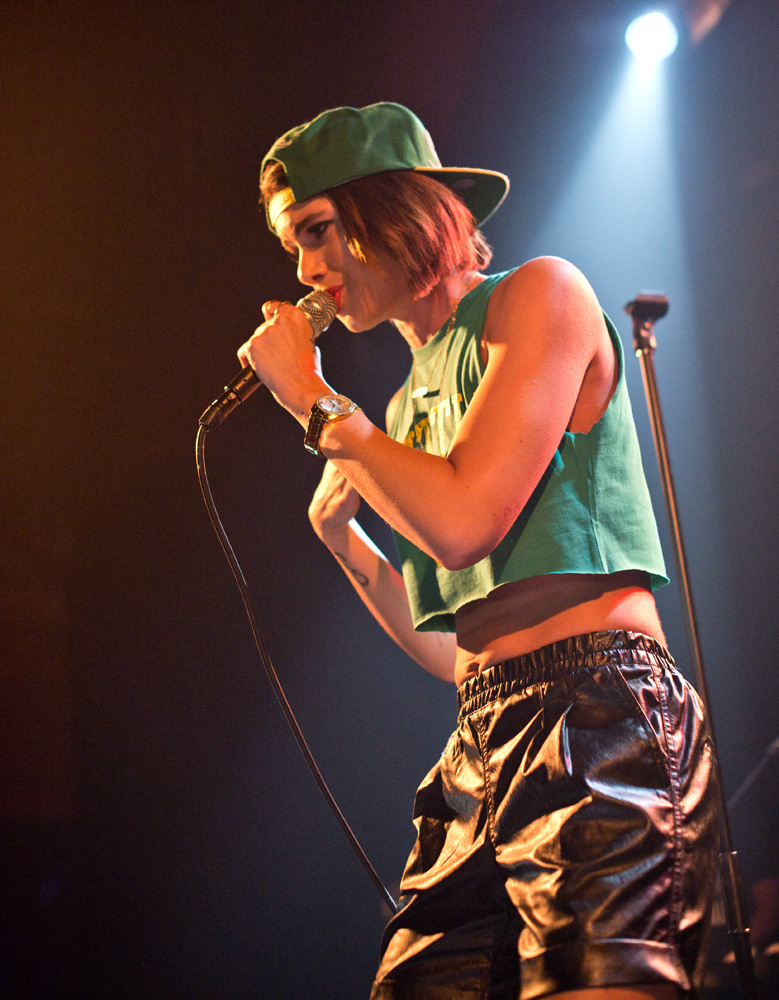
LaBelle performing at the Crocodile Cafe in Seattle in October 2013

The sampler was promoted with the singles "Sexify" and "What Do We Got To Lose?". "Sexify" peaked at number 23 on the Adult R&B Songs and at number 89 on the Hot R&B/Hip-Hop Songs Billboard charts. In a 2018 Billboard article, Natalie Maher referred to it as LaBelle's breakthrough single. LaBelle said the sampler resembled the sound for her debut studio album, which she described as "feel-good texture music" with a "throwback-but-new feel". Although her debut album was reportedly set for a 2012 release, later being delayed to 2013, it was ultimately never released.

At the 2012 Soul Train Music Awards, LaBelle received the Soul Train Centric Award and performed a tribute to Aretha Franklin and Teena Marie with Fantasia. She sang at the 2012 Essence Music Festival in New Orleans and BET's Music Matters showcase, which was held over the weekend of the 55th Annual Grammy Awards. The non-album single, "Lolita", was released in May 2013, and a digital set of remixes and instrumentals of the song was made available a month earlier. The single reached number seven on the Billboard Dance Club Songs chart.

In 2013 LaBelle was featured on Brian Cross's single "Shot Gun" on his album Pop Star – The Album, and provided background vocals for Nelly's seventh studio album M.O. In October, she was the opening act for JoJo's Agápē Tour, and appeared in the music video for her single "André" on her mixtape Agápē. LaBelle was also a dancer in the 24-hour music video for Williams' 2013 single "Happy". Throughout the day-long video, Williams dances with people in several Los Angeles locations. In 2014, she was featured with JoJo on the hidden track "Freq" on Williams' second studio album G I R L.

LaBelle reunited with Heard in 2017 during the 59th Annual Grammy Awards. Heard said she was going through a "dark period", and he believed she had given up on her music career when her singles underperformed.

== Death and aftermath ==
On January 31, 2018, LaBelle and her boyfriend, retired NBA player Rasual Butler, died in a single vehicle car crash in the Studio City neighborhood of Los Angeles, California, after he lost control of his Range Rover on Ventura Boulevard, hit a curb, and crashed into a strip mall parking lot. The car flipped twice before coming to rest. Before the crash, which occurred at 2:25 a.m. Pacific Time, Butler was driving two to three times over the speed limit. They both died instantly from "multiple traumatic injuries". According to an autopsy report, Butler had methamphetamine, oxycodone, and marijuana in his system and a blood alcohol level of 0.118. LaBelle had a blood alcohol level of 0.144 and methamphetamine and amphetamine in her system at the time of the incident.

While multiple reports at the time of the incident referred to Butler as LaBelle's husband, her obituaries and her official website clarified that they were not married. On February 3, 2018, Butler's daughter from a past relationship, Raven, held a joint memorial service at Potter's House, a Christian church in Los Angeles. LaBelle and Butler had both been members of the church. The memorial was streamed online. An individual service was held for LaBelle on February 24 at Garfield High School. Her mother provided a $10,000 scholarship under her daughter's name to a University of Southern California student with an art major.

In February 2018, Dupri and Bryan-Michael Cox released two tracks – "Scumbag" and "Stereo" – by LaBelle. The same month, Heard expressed interest in making available unreleased material that he had recorded with her. A posthumous EP, Love to the Moon, was released on September 7, 2018. The five songs were donated by their producers: Williams, Midi Jones, Sam Hook, and Tom Strahle. JoJo included dedications to LaBelle on her social media for a week. A trailer for the EP was released on LaBelle's Vevo account on September 11, 2018. Proceeds from the EP were donated to other yearly scholarships.

== Discography ==
=== Sampler ===
Title	Album details	List of songs
Pharrell Williams and Jermaine Dupri Present Leah LaBelle	Released: May 1, 2012; Label: Epic (88725 40238 2); Released for record companies	Track listing: 1. "So Hot"; 2. "Sexify"; 3. "Make Me Get Up"; 4. "What Do We Got To Lose?"; 5. "Mr. Scissors"

=== Extended play ===
Title	EP details	List of songs
Love to the Moon	Released: September 7, 2018; Label: Leah Labelle; Posthumous release	Track listing: 1. "Sun"; 2. "Made Man"; 3. "Something About the Cold"; 4. "Lost Angels"; 5. "Orange Skies"

=== Singles ===
List of singles, with selected chart positions, showing year released
Title	Year	Peak chart positions			Album
Title	Year	US Dance Club	US Adult R&B	US R&B/Hip-Hop	Album
"Sexify"	2012	—	23	89	Pharrell Williams and Jermaine Dupri; Present Leah LaBelle
"What Do We Got to Lose?"	2012	—	—	—	Pharrell Williams and Jermaine Dupri; Present Leah LaBelle
"Lolita"	2013	7	—	—	Non-album single
"—" denotes items that failed to chart or were not released in that country.

=== Other appearances ===
Title	Year	Album
"Betcha by Golly, Wow"	2004	American Idol Season 3: Greatest Soul Classics
"Christmas Time"	2004	Christmas in the Northwest, Vol. 7.
"Silent Night" (with Lisa Leuschner)	2004	Sing Me Home
"Angel" (with Kumasi)	2009	The One
"Shot Gun" (with Brian Cross)	2013	Pop Star – The Album
"Freq" (with Pharrell Williams and JoJo)	2014	Girl

== Filmography ==
Year	Show	Role	Notes
2000–2002	Caught in the Middle	Herself	
2004	American Idol	Herself (finalist)	Season 3
2008	American Idol Rewind	Herself (finalist)	

== Stage ==
Year	Production	Role
1998–2003	Black Nativity	Unknown
