= Lolita (Leah LaBelle song) =

Single by Leah LaBelle
- Released: May 7, 2013
- Genre: Funk; pop; R&B
- Length: 2:49
- Label: Epic; So So Def; I Am Other
- Songwriters: Pharrell Williams; Kelly Sheehan
- Producer: Pharrell Williams

Leah LaBelle singles chronology
"What Do We Got To Lose?" (2012)	"Lolita" (2013)

"Lolita" is a song recorded by American singer Leah LaBelle. It was released on May 7, 2013, through Epic. The single was written by American songwriter Kelly Sheehan in collaboration with record producer Pharrell Williams. Backed by synthesizers and a bass guitar, it is a midtempo funk, R&B, and pop song with disco influences. Media commentators have suggested the song was inspired by Vladimir Nabokov's 1955 novel Lolita, and noted that its lyrics greatly diverge from the source material.

"Lolita" was positively received by music critics, who praised its chorus, Williams' production, and LaBelle's vocal performance. The single ranked number seven on the Dance Club Songs Billboard chart in the United States. Internationally, it peaked at number 264 on the official Tophit airplay chart. To promote "Lolita", LaBelle sang an acoustic version for Rap-Up, and performed the original version at various venues, such as New York Fashion Week and the Club Skirts Dinah Shore Weekend.

Directed by Diane Martel, the single's accompanying music video features LaBelle as Lolita and shows how she seduces boys from her neighborhood. The video received attention due to its focus on sexuality. Welsh singer-songwriter Charlotte Church strongly criticized Martel's creation of sexually-explicit music videos, and Idolator selected the carwash scene as an instance in which the video emphasized sexuality. Despite the criticism, LaBelle's performance garnered positive reviews.

== Background and release ==
American singer Leah LaBelle initially rose to fame in 2004 as a finalist on the third season of American Idol, and found minor success through releasing covers of songs on her YouTube account. American singer Keri Hilson hired LaBelle as a backup singer after listening to her rendition of her 2009 single "Energy". American record producers Pharrell Williams and Jermaine Dupri had first noticed LaBelle while she was performing with Hilson, and provided her with a joint record deal with L.A. Reid's company Epic, Dupri's So So Def Recordings, and Williams' label I Am Other. In 2012, LaBelle released her debut single "Sexify", which Natalie Maher of Billboard identified as her "breakout song", and a five-track sampler album Pharrell Williams and Jermaine Dupri Present Leah LaBelle.

"Lolita" was written by American songwriter Kelly Sheehan in collaboration with Pharrell Williams. Andrew Coleman and Mike Larson recorded LaBelle's vocals, and Coleman edited them. Matthew Desremeaux, PJ McGinnis, and Tony Olivera provided additional engineering, and Leslie Brathwaite mixed the audio. On March 26, 2013, Epic Records released a digital extended play, 10 electro house remixes and instrumentals of "Lolita" by DJs Sidney Samson, Sick Individuals, and Chris Cox. The single was released as a digital download in select parts of the world through Epic Records on May 7, 2013, before being made available internationally on July 5. Its cover features LaBelle in a revealing outfit that showcases her cleavage and legs.

== Composition and lyrical interpretation ==
"Lolita"
A sample of Leah Labelle's "Lolita", in which she sings the chorus backed by synthesizers and a bass guitar. Critics identified the track as funk with disco influences.

"Lolita" is a midtempo funk, R&B, and pop song, which lasts two minutes and 49 seconds. Its instrumentation is provided by synthesizers, a bass guitar, and it features a stomp progression. MTV News' Jenna Hally Rubenstein described the song as featuring "a deep-bass disco vibe with a layer of grime", while Bradley Stern of MuuMuse interpreted it as a "blend of funk and ferocity" and a "disco-tinged strut".

In the single, LaBelle teases the listener with the lyrics: "Am I the aim of your fascination? / Am I the eye of your storm?". During the chorus, she is described as crooning the following lyrics: "Baby, I was born to make you do something you've never done / You'll be forever young / I'm your Lolita." LaBelle continues to seduce the listener by singing: "Leave your pinstripes and your 9 to 5 in my Lolita eyes tonight / Come on, let's dirty up your mind."

Media commentators have discussed the connection between the single and Vladimir Nabokov's 1955 novel Lolita. David Drake of Complex viewed the lyrics as diverging dramatically from the character of Lolita in Nabokov's novel, and Jenna Hally Rubenstein found it to be a loose adaptation. D-Money from SoulBounce.com noted that LaBelle's age differentiated her from the Nabokov character, but described the singer as "embod[ying] the alluring essence of the literary temptress". LaBelle clarified that the single was not directly about the novel Lolita or an attraction to youth; she suggested instead that it was about being someone's desire or fantasy.

== Reception ==
"Lolita" has received mostly positive reviews from music critics. Brad Stern of MTV News praised the song as a "fresh, obsessively repeat-friendly cut" and a "slice of strut-friendly goodness". Idolator's Sam Lansky wrote that it should have received more attention from mainstream media. A contributor for Soulhead.com commended LaBelle's vocal performance, describing that the song as having "clearly articulated lyrics that are sung with passion". The reviewer added that the record added to the anticipation of the release of LaBelle's debut album. Jenna Hally Rubenstein wrote that "Lolita" was an excellent example of Williams' capabilities as a producer, and appreciated its adaptation of the Nabokov story. Bradley Stern found it to be an improvement over "Sexify", writing that it was the type of sound that he wanted American singer Justin Timberlake to release on his 2013 album The 20/20 Experience for his return to music. On the other hand, Centric's Justin Joseph criticized LaBelle's interpretation of Lolita as "borderline side-eye worthy", but he praised the production as sounding like "a fresh and youthful R&B jam".

In the week of March 22, 2013, "Lolita" was listed as one of the "breakout tracks" for the Dance Club Songs Billboard chart, which meant that it was expected to debut on the chart within several weeks. It reached the top 20 of the chart the week of May 5, 2013, before reaching a peak position of number seven at the end of the month. Internationally, "Lolita" ranked on the official Tophit airplay chart at number 264 in June, 2013.

== Music video and promotion ==
=== Music video ===
The music video's representation of sexuality received multiple comments from critics, with Idolator's Lansky highlighting the carwash scene.

A lyric video was uploaded to LaBelle's Vevo account on February 11, 2013. It was filmed by director Diane Martel in Los Angeles, and was released on May 8, 2013. BET aired the video, and included it on its countdown show 106 & Park.

In the video, LaBelle plays the part of Lolita, defined as a "badass baby girl", and seduces boys in her neighborhood. The singer is shown watering flowers while wearing a skirt, dancing in the streets, and counting money while sitting on a lemonade stand. Throughout the scenes, she wears crop tops and short skirts and shorts. The video reverses the imagery of the heart-shaped glasses from Stanley Kubrick's 1962 film Lolita, by having the shirtless men wear them as they pursue LaBelle. The men serve as LaBelle's "heart eyed entourage" and "her own personal secret service"; they are seen washing a toy car in a carwash and presenting the singer with a life-sized teddy bear.

LaBelle sex appeal received attention from media outlets. Baffuor Gyamfi of Mass Appeal praised LaBelle's presence in the video, writing that the singer's "sex appeal dominates the video, no matter how weird things get". Welsh singer-songwriter Charlotte Church criticized Diane Martel for her creation of sexually-explicit music videos, and referenced the "Lolita" video as "an objectionable little number"; Church disapproved of the single's title. Idolator's Sam Lansky called the video "crazy-sexy-cool", saying of the carwash scene – "[Y]ikes!". D-Money was critical of the lack of choreography, citing it as an example of Martel's emphasis on style over performance in her music videos.

=== Live performances ===
LaBelle first performed "Lolita" as a part of a set for BET's Music Matters, held over the weekend of the 55th Annual Grammy Awards. In the same year, she performed the song for the Boy Meets Girl runway during New York Fashion Week on February 20 and the Club Skirts Dinah Shore Weekend in April, 2013. For the latter, she sang it along with "Sexify". She performed an acoustic version of the single for Rap-Up, along with "Mr. Scissors" from her sampler album and a cover of Daft Punk's 2013 single "Get Lucky".

== Formats and track listings ==
Digital download
No.	Title	Length
1.	"Lolita"	2:49

Digital download (Remixes)
No.	Title	Length
1.	"Lolita [Sidney Samson Remix] Original Mix"	5:18
2.	"Lolita [Sidney Samson Remix] Radio Mix"	3:08
3.	"Lolita [Sidney Samson Instrumental]"	5:18
4.	"Lolita [Sick Individuals Remix] Original Mix"	6:05
5.	"Lolita [Sick Individuals Remix] Radio Mix"	3:06
6.	"Lolita [Sick Individuals Remix] Instrumental"	6:05
7.	"Lolita [Chris Cox Club Mix] Original Mix"	7:23
8.	"Lolita [Chris Cox Radio Mix] Original Mix"	3:33
9.	"Lolita [Chrix Cox Dub] Instrumental"	6:04
10.	"Lolita [Chris Cox Mixshow] Original Mix"	5:35

== Credits and personnel ==
Credits adapted from the liner notes of "Lolita".

Personnel

- Lyrics By – Kelly Sheehan, Pharrell Williams
- Produced By – Pharrell Williams
- Recorded By – Andrew Coleman, Mike Larson
- Edited By – Andrew Coleman
- Engineer (Assistant Engineer) – Matthew Desremeaux, PJ McGinnis, Tony Olivera
- Mixed By – Leslie Brathwaite

== Charts ==
Chart (2012)	Peak position
US Dance Club Songs (Billboard)	7

== Release history ==
Region	Format	Date	Label
United States	Remix package	March 26, 2013	Epic
Spain	Digital download	May 7, 2013	Epic
Sweden	Digital download	May 7, 2013	Epic
United Kingdom	Digital download	May 7, 2013	Epic
United States	Digital download	May 7, 2013	Epic
Austria	Digital download	July 5, 2013	Epic
Canada	Digital download	July 5, 2013	Epic
Finland	Digital download	July 5, 2013	Epic
France	Digital download	July 5, 2013	Epic
Germany	Digital download	July 5, 2013	Epic
Ireland	Digital download	July 5, 2013	Epic
Italy	Digital download	July 5, 2013	Epic
Netherlands	Digital download	July 5, 2013	Epic
Norway	Digital download	July 5, 2013	Epic
