= Red (John Stevens album) =

Studio album by John Stevens
- Released: June 28, 2005
- Recorded: 2005
- Genre: Pop
- Label: Maverick Records
- Producer: Bob Mann

Professional ratings
Review scores
Source	Rating
AllMusic	3/5 stars

Red is the debut album recorded by American Idol 3 contestant John Stevens. The album reached the top ten of the Billboard Jazz Albums chart. Also, the song, "Come Fly with Me", reached number 27 on the Hot Singles Sales chart.

== Track listing ==
1. "Come Fly with Me"
2. "My Blue Heaven"
3. "Someone to Watch Over Me"
4. "Here, There and Everywhere"
5. "All of Me"
6. "This Love"
7. "I Only Have Eyes for You"
8. "Let's Fall in Love" (Duet with Erika Christensen)
9. "It Had to Be You"
10. "The Shadow of Your Smile"
11. "Don't Get Around Much Anymore"
