= Sexify =

Sexify may refer to:

- "Sexify" (song), a 2012 single by Leah LaBelle
- Sexify (TV series), a Polish television series

== See also ==
- Sexualization
