= Just like Magic =

Just like Magic may refer to:

- Just like Magic, a 1991 album by Special EFX
- Just like Magic, a 2009 album by Donnie Williams
- "Just like Magic", a 2016 song by Casey Barnes
- "Just like Magic", a song by Ariana Grande from the 2020 album Positions
- "Just like Magic", a song by Jackson Wang from the 2020 album Magic Man
