= Srebyrnite grivni =

Srebyrnite grivni (Bulgarian: "silver bracelets") was one of the first rock music groups in Bulgaria.

The band was created in 1964 in Sofia, with founding members Valentin Stefanov (guitar and vocals), Aleksander Petrounov (bass and vocals), Troshan Vladovski (rhythm guitar and vocals) and Zhorzhan Banov (percussions and vocals). Their first works were covers of The Shadows and The Kinks, in which renowned Bulgarian pop artist Boris Gudzhunov took part as well. Later the band played a mixture of rock and Bulgarian folk music (many times in complicated time signatures); more specifically, they created a number of rock adaptations of folk songs, with which they had considerable success. During that period, they collaborated with the likes of composer Milcho Leviev and pop and rock musician Georgi Minchev. The band split in 1971.

One of the key founding members, Alexander Petrounov (vocals, bass) currently lives in South Florida. He is the founder of Petrounov Musical Instruments (PMI). PMI designs and builds 4- and 5-string basses, 5-string fretless basses, and electric guitars. Troshan Vladovski moved to North America in 1981 and lived between Washington and Canada, where his daughter Leah LaBelle was born.
