= Beantown Swing Orchestra =

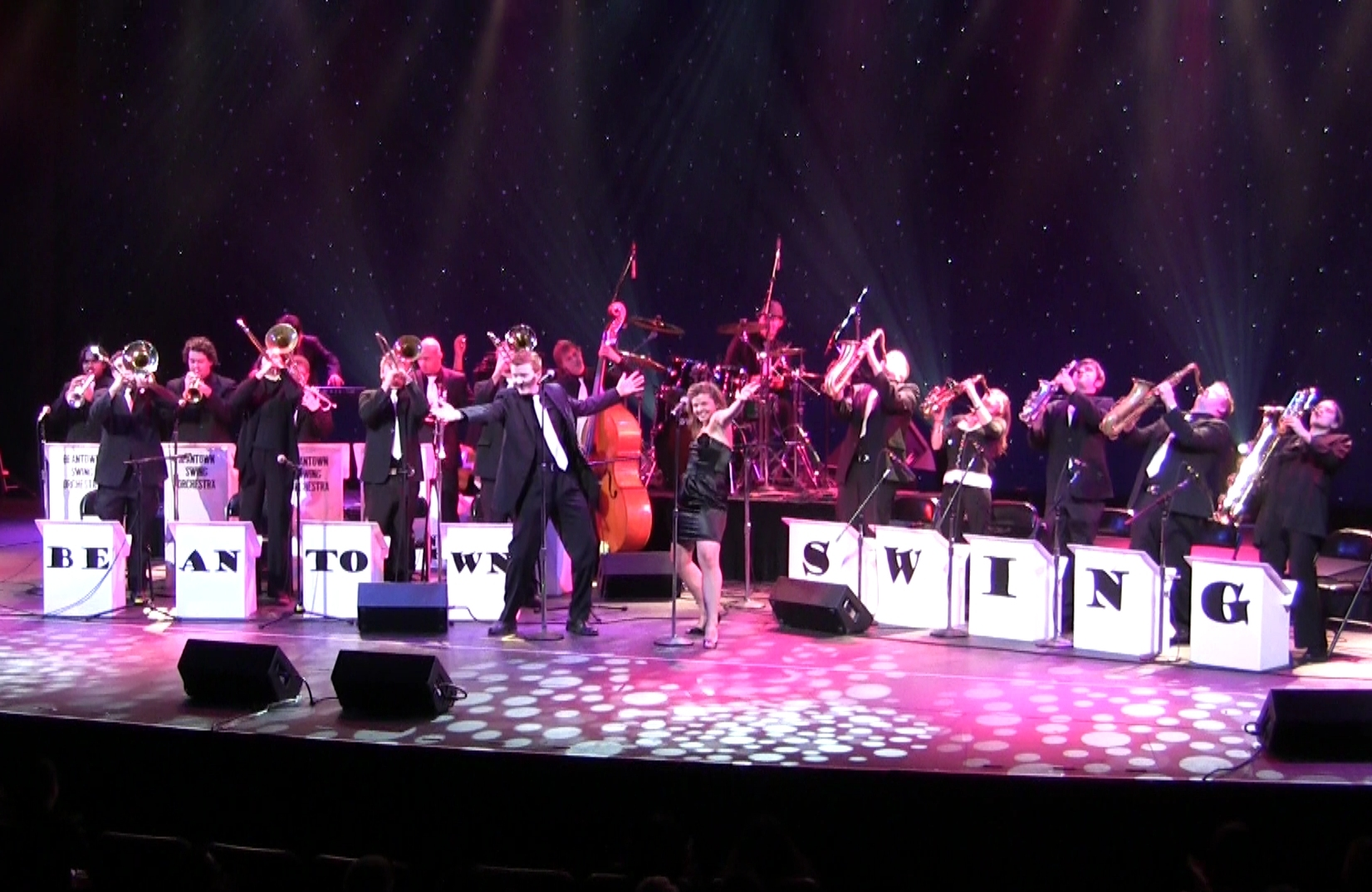
- Beantown Swing Orchestra at Foxwoods' Fox Theatre in 2010

Background information
- Origin: Boston, Massachusetts, United States
- Genres: Swing, Big band
- Years active: 2006– present
- Website: www.beantownswing.com

The Beantown Swing Orchestra is a Boston-based 18-piece big band that was formed in 2006 by Frank Hsieh. Initially specializing in performing the classic dance music from the Swing Era, the band has since expanded its repertoire to include transcriptions of Frank Sinatra's big band arrangements, and most recently its own arrangements of popular and original songs. In 2007, the Beantown Swing Orchestra featured performer Jonathan Meath, who performed as Santa Claus in three shows. Since 2007, all of the band's charts have been transcribed or arranged by trumpeter Danny Fratina. The group's best-known vocalists are fellow American Idol sixth-place finishers Siobhan Magnus and John Stevens, although it also features other female vocalists including American Idol semi-finalist Jen Hirsh, NYC-based jazz vocalist Laura Brunner, and singer/songwriter Erin McKeown. The band performs regularly at weddings, galas, and concerts throughout the Northeastern United States. Former trombonist Nick Noonan is one half of the pop duo Karmin.

The Beantown Swing Orchestra appears as itself in the 2008 movie My Best Friend’s Girl. Two tracks previously recorded live by the band - Hava Nagila and Sing, Sing, Sing - were used in wedding reception scenes that depicted the band performing.

Since January 2009, the band has been working with Boston radio personality Ron Della Chiesa to promote classic American swing music, both on the radio and via live performances hosted by Chiesa.

Jen Hirsh, the band's longest tenured vocalist, was a contestant on American Idol Season 9, having advanced to Hollywood after singing "Ding Dong! The Witch Is Dead" in the Boston auditions. She did not advance past the first Hollywood round. In 2012 she was a contestant in Season 11 and was a semi-finalist, earning almost entirely positive praise from judges and fans alike.

The band recorded an original version of the Foxwoods Resort Casino theme song "The Wonder Of It All" for a contest to determine the casino's next jingle performer. They were among ten finalists chosen to perform their version live at Foxwoods on February 27, 2010.
