= Donnie Williams =

American singer-songwriter (born 1983)

- Born: Donnie Williams; July 26, 1983 (age 43)
- Origin: Baton Rouge, Louisiana, United States
- Genres: Contemporary R&B; Soul; Gospel; Jazz
- Occupation: Singer-songwriter
- Years active: 2004–present
- Label: Chump Change Records
- Website: Chump Change Records

Donnie Williams (born July 26, 1983) is an American soul, gospel and jazz singer-songwriter who in 2004 became a Top 32 contestant in Season 3 of American Idol. He currently resides in the Bay Area, California.

== Early life ==
Williams comes from a family of vocalists. His mother, Gladys Williams, performed in clubs around Baton Rouge with soul R&B singer-pianist Bobby Powell and with blues singer and harmonica player, Raful Neal. Donnie's father, Eddie McQuarter, is a gospel singer, and the R&B-turned-gospel singer Beau Williams is a cousin.

Donnie Williams made his public performing debut aged 11, at Mount Wade Baptist Church in Baton Rouge with a rendition of the Winans' "He Set Me Free". At school, Williams and his sister Terrell won first place in a talent show singing Bobby Brown and Whitney Houston's "Something in Common". Williams made his nightclub debut at the age of 15, singing Sam Cooke's "A Change Is Gonna Come" at Raful Neal's blues bar in Baton Rouge.

Before relocating to the Bay Area city of Livermore in 2000 with his mother and his four siblings, Williams made his recording debut singing hooks on a CD by the Baton Rouge hip-hop group Smoke Click. In Oakland, he did likewise for the hip-hop crew Big Bang Theory, with whom he performed locally, including opening a show for E-40.

== Career ==
Williams was lubing cars at Wal-Mart in Livermore in 2004 when two coworkers overheard him singing as he worked and suggested he try out for American Idol. One offered to drive him to Pasadena for the audition. They arrived and Williams sang "A Song for You" for judges Simon Cowell and Randy Jackson. Williams was quickly put through to Hollywood after receiving positive commentary from the judges.

Williams made it into the Top 32 of American Idol's third season, along with Fantasia Barrino, Jennifer Hudson, and friend LaToya London. Some say he seemed a sure shot for the Top 12 but one night before he was slated to return to Hollywood for the next segment of the show, he was invited to a celebration party thrown by friends. He had too much to drink and was arrested on the way home for driving under the influence. As a result, the producers of American Idol kicked him off the show and replaced him with George Huff. Donnie was distraught. He quit drinking and his sobriety is reflected in the ballad "Higher Power" on his debut album Just like Magic, and particularly in the anti-substance abuse message of the video for the song.

In its "Best of the East Bay 2008" issue, the East Bay Express Newspaper named him "The Best R&B or Soul Singer" next to Goapele, who won "Reader’s Choice Award." In 2007 The San Francisco Chronicle called him "a soul stylist of the first order" who "might have given Fantasia Barrino some serious competition on "American Idol" if he had not been bounced from the show early in 2004 after a drunken-driving arrest."

Williams credits Stevie Wonder, Sam Cooke, Ron Isley and Donny Hathaway as influences and also includes gospel singers Marvin Winans and Dorinda Clark-Cole among his favorites. He has sung the national anthem at an NBA Warriors basketball game.

=== Recordings ===
A few years after being kicked off American Idol, he returned with a fresh outlook on life. He hooked up with Park Place band leader and Bay Area-based Paul Tillman Smith to begin recording his debut album Just like Magic. Smith's compositions have been recorded in past years by such singers as Phyllis Hyman, Jean Carne, Lady Bianca, Freddie Hughes, Derrick Hughes, Lenny Williams, Rosie Gaines, and the late Prince vocalist Bonnie Boyer. Multi-instrumentalist Nelson Braxton (Frank McComb, Martin Luther, Ledisi, Braxton Brothers) and Norman Connors additionally serve as co-producers of the CD.

Donnie says the lead single "Higher Power" was created to inspire a sense of hope. Guest vocalist LaToya London appears on "Send My Baby Back", a 1968 hit by Berkeley vocalist Freddie Hughes. London additionally materializes in a duet on the title track "Just like Magic". Several songs from Just like Magic are featured in the upcoming film Tears of a Clown, featuring BET comedian D.C. Curry, which was nominated for "Best Feature Film of the Year" at the Pan African Film Festival.

"Just like Magic" features keyboardist and hip-hop MC Kev Choice (voted by East Bay Express as "The Most Multi-Talented Musician"), who served as musical tour director for Lauryn Hill in both 2006 and 2007. On keys Kev Choice has supported such artists as Michael Franti and Spearhead, Goapele, Too Short, Martin Luther, Jennifer Johns, DJ Quik and Zion I. Music can be heard from keyboardist Sundra Manning who is most well known for her collaborative work alongside Grammy-nominated vocalist Ledisi on the debut album Soulsinger. Other cameos include vocalists Rosie Gaines and Bonnie Boyer (Prince), keyboardists Michael Stanton, Rodney Franklin and Herman Jackson (musical director for Jessica Simpson, Stevie Wonder, the Isley Brothers and Marvin Gaye), Eric Daniels (musical director for Mariah Carey and Janet Jackson), sax men Scott Mayo (Earth, Wind and Fire), Vince Lars and Charlie Spikes (Tony Toni Tone), guitarists Carl Lockett and Tommy Oregon (Janet Jackson), drummer Brian Collier and the Oak Town Horns.

== Discography ==
=== Albums ===
- Just like Magic, 2009

=== Singles ===
- "Higher Power" (2009)
