= Sexify (song) =

Single by Leah LaBelle

from the album Pharrell Williams and Jermaine Dupri Present Leah LaBelle
- Released: May 1, 2012
- Recorded: 2012; Miami
- Genre: R&B
- Length: 3:28
- Label: Epic; So So Def; I Am Other
- Songwriter: Pharrell Williams
- Producer: Pharrell Williams

Leah LaBelle singles chronology
"Sexify" (2012)	"What Do We Got To Lose?" (2012)

"Sexify" is a song recorded by American singer Leah LaBelle, which was released on May 1, 2012, as part of the sampler album Pharrell Williams and Jermaine Dupri Present Leah LaBelle (2012). Written and produced by Pharrell Williams, it was the first song that LaBelle recorded with Williams as part of a joint record deal with Epic Records, So So Def Recordings, and I Am Other. It is an R&B song that features throwback elements to 1990s music. In its lyrics inspired by headlines from the women's fashion magazine Cosmopolitan, LaBelle instructs a woman on how to draw and keep the attention of a man.

"Sexify" received mostly positive reviews from music critics who praised LaBelle's sound and Williams' production. It did receive some criticism, with one critic questioning whether the throwback nature of the single would negatively affect its commercial potential. The song peaked at number 23 and number 89 on the Adult R&B Songs and the Hot R&B/Hip-Hop Songs Billboard charts respectively. It had a large increase in digital downloads after its inclusion in an episode of R&B Divas: Atlanta.

The song's accompanying music video was directed by Sarah Chatfield and shows LaBelle holding a pizza party with her friends, after giving them advice on how to "sexify" themselves. It features cameos from Williams, So So Def Recording's founder Jermaine Dupri, and American singer JoJo. LaBelle performed the song live during promotional appearances at New York City media outlets.

== Background and release ==
Initially rising to fame in 2004 as a finalist on the third season of American Idol, Leah LaBelle found minor success through releasing covers of songs on her YouTube account. American record producer Pharrell Williams discovered LaBelle through her videos and called So So Def Recording's founder and CEO Jermaine Dupri for his opinion regarding her. In 2011, LaBelle was signed to a joint record deal with L.A. Reid's company Epic Records, Dupri's So So Def Recordings, and Williams' label I Am Other. LaBelle said that Williams and Dupri were drawn to her style of performing.

Recorded in Miami, "Sexify" was the first song that LaBelle and Williams completed together; it was written and produced solely by Williams. Additional and assistant engineering was carried out by Beau Villas and Matthew Desremeaux. The track was mixed by Jimmy Douglass, and mastered by Dave Kutch. Andrew Coleman recorded and edited the final product.

On May 1, 2012, "Sexify" was released as part of the sampler album Pharrell Williams and Jermaine Dupri Present Leah LaBelle; it also included four other tracks: "So Hot", "Make Me Get Up", "What Do We Got To Lose?", and "Mr. Scissors". LaBelle described the sampler as representative of her overall sound, calling it "that feel-good-texture music" with a "throwback-but-new feel". "Sexify" was released separately as a digital download on the following dates in July depending upon the country: (July 19, July 22, and July 29).

== Composition and lyrical interpretation ==
"Sexify"
A 22-second sample of the song. The audio sample includes Labelle's use of the word "sexify", which was inspired by issues of Cosmopolitan.

"Sexify" is a three-minute, 28-second R&B song that was inspired by headlines from the women's fashion magazine Cosmopolitan. According to LaBelle, the song originated from a discussion with Williams about "the Cosmopolitan women of today", and the duo compiled a list of frequently used phrases from the magazine that could be used as lyrics. Cosmopolitan's Korin Miller connected the single's title with a headline from the magazine's November 2011 cover: "Sexify Your Eyes".

The lyrics feature LaBelle offering advice on how to keep a man's attention and sexual interest. LaBelle described the single as an "anthem for women", in which she defined the term "sexify" as a way for women to "make [themselves] feel comfortable and confident and happy and proud" or help their men feel the same way. The chorus is accompanied by a "summery two-step tune", including lyrics such as "I gotta whole bunch of ways" and "He'll come home girl / If you know what I mean." LaBelle continues to instruct women by singing: "I'll sexify you / Have you thinking about my name in the middle of the day."

Bradley Stern of MuuMuse described "Sexify" as a "throwback to classic, feel-good R&B"; LaBelle's vocal performance was viewed as "raspy" by Soulbounce.com. During an interview with Essence, LaBelle said that she was first introduced to R&B music after her parents emigrated from Bulgaria to the United States. She recounted that she was initially discouraged from pursuing a career in the genre, but later said that she was not concerned with "the clichés surrounding white artists singing R&B". She followed this up saying: "I just want to make good music. I'm here and I'm doing what I love and the music that I love. It's going to reach who it's supposed to reach." LaBelle was identified as a blue-eyed soul singer by Essence.

== Critical reception ==
"Sexify" received primarily positive reception from music critics, with the single being called a "fun-girl talk anthem" and "a wonderful introduction to Leah's soulful sound" by BET. It was praised for being catchy and radio-friendly by Singersroom and Complex. Nicole James found the song to be "a much needed dose of late-'90s R&B realness". The single was listed as an example of the female R&B revival in 2012 by MTV's Katherine St. Asaph, who commended it as "retro-sassy" and "improbably great". Alternatively, SoulBounce.com felt that the throwback nature of the song would limit its chances for commercial success.

Critics also positively commented on LaBelle's vocal performance. Korin Miller praised LaBelle's vocals during a live performance, calling the lyrics "so fun and Cosmo-y". Rap-Up also complimented LaBelle's voice as powerful, and wrote that the instrumental was an example of a "signature Pharrell production". Nicole James of Fuse wrote that the song had a similar throwback style to that of Brandy, Alicia Keys, and Whitney Houston. The single was determined to be a good match for LaBelle's voice by SoulBounce.com, who called it a "solid enough cut". Complex's Jacob Moore wrote that the single and its accompanying video positively showcased LaBelle's look and sound.

== Commercial performance ==
In May 2012, "Sexify" reached a position of number three on the Bubbling Under R&B/Hip-Hop Singles Billboard chart. It debuted on the Hot R&B/Hip-Hop Songs Billboard chart three weeks later, and went on to peak at number 89 in July. It stayed on the chart for a total of ten weeks. "Sexify" later peaked at number 23 on the Adult R&B Songs Billboard chart on August 4, and remained on the chart for a total of ten weeks. Following the song's inclusion in Love & Hip Hop: Atlanta, LaBelle's digital sales increased by over 500 percent. It was featured in the fourth episode of the first season of the series during a scene in which "Scrappy reveals that he and Shay are more than just friends".

== Music video and promotion ==
A lyric video for the single was released in April. A music video, filmed by director Sarah Chatfield, was completed in Los Angeles in March 2012. In the video, LaBelle instructs her friends over the phone about how to "sexify" themselves while taking a bubble bath and modeling clothing in her wardrobe. The video ends with LaBelle inviting them to a pizza party in her apartment. Close-ups to LaBelle's closet are shown throughout the video, as well as a product placement featuring Qream crème liqueur. It includes cameos by Williams as a pizza delivery boy, Dupri as LaBelle's landlord, and American singer JoJo as one of her friends. The music video premiered on MTV.com, and was introduced by LaBelle, Durpi, and Williams on the music video show 106 & Park. Nicole James complimented LaBelle's hairstyle, and described the video as her new favorite. Prior to the release of the music video, a behind-the-scenes clip was shown as an episode of Living the Life, which included choreographer Fatima Robinson and LaBelle's mother.

LaBelle first performed "Sexify" during a promotional appearance at the Cosmopolitan headquarters, and later promoted the single through performances at "various New York media outlets", such as the Billboard and The Boombox offices. On May 4, Cosmopolitan offered free MP3 downloads of "Sexify" to new subscribers of LaBelle's mailing list, with the single being officially released on ITunes on June 19, 2012. LaBelle later performed the song at the Essence Music Festival, and a private benefit concert for the October 2012 issue of Vanity Fair. During the 2012 International Yardfest at Howard University, she sang "Sexify" as part of a medley with Williams' 2003 single "Frontin'". The following year, she performed the single as a part of a set for BET's Music Matters held on the weekend of the 55th Annual Grammy Awards.

== Formats and track listing ==
Album sampler
No.	Title	Length
1.	"So Hot"	4:07
2.	"Sexify"	3:29
3.	"Make Me Get Up"	3:46
4.	"What Do We Got To Lose?"	3:50
5.	"Mr. Scissors"	4:13

Digital download
No.	Title	Length
1.	"Sexify"	3:28

== Personnel ==
Credits adapted from the liner notes of "Sexify".

Management

- Epic Records

Personnel

- Composed By, Lyrics By – Pharrell Williams
- Engineer (Assistant Engineer) – Beau Vallas, Matthew Desremeaux
- Mastered By – Dave Kutch
- Mixed By – Jimmy Douglass
- Producer – Pharrell Williams
- Recorded By, Edited By – Andrew Coleman

== Charts ==
Chart (2012)	Peak position
US Adult R&B Songs (Billboard)	23
US Hot R&B/Hip-Hop Songs (Billboard)	89

== Release history ==
Country	Date	Format	Label
United States	May 1, 2012	CD single	Epic Records
Canada	June 19, 2012	Digital download	Epic Records
Finland	June 19, 2012	Digital download	Epic Records
France	June 19, 2012	Digital download	Epic Records
Spain	June 19, 2012	Digital download	Epic Records
United Kingdom	June 19, 2012	Digital download	Epic Records
United States	June 19, 2012	Digital download	Epic Records
Ireland	June 22, 2012	Digital download	Epic Records
Italy	June 22, 2012	Digital download	Epic Records
Netherlands	June 22, 2012	Digital download	Epic Records
Norway	June 22, 2012	Digital download	Epic Records
Sweden	June 22, 2012	Digital download	Epic Records
Austria	June 29, 2012	Digital download	Epic Records
Germany	June 29, 2012	Digital download	Epic Records
