= Total Experience Gospel Choir =

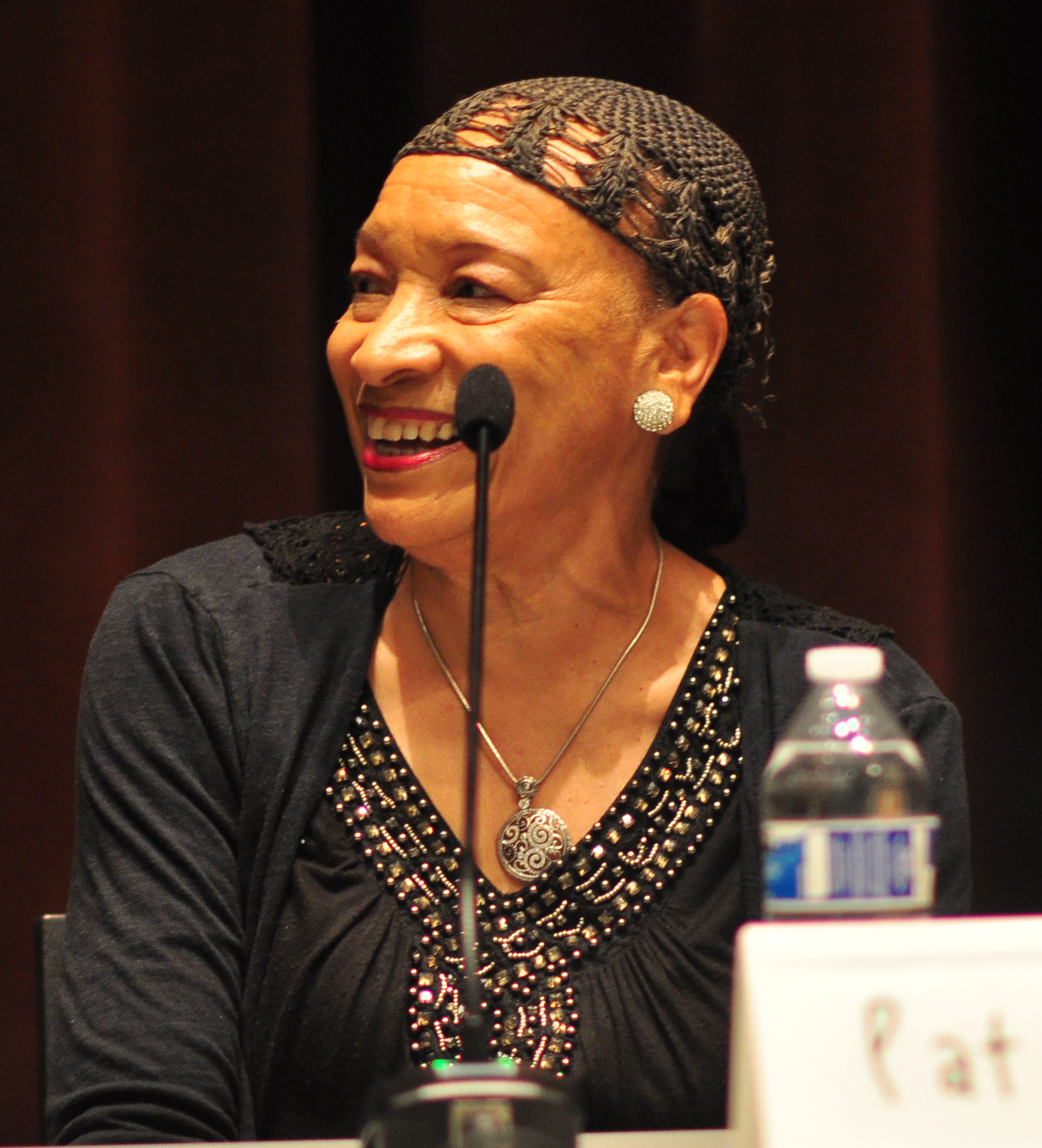
Pat Wright, 2016

The Total Experience Gospel Choir was a gospel music group based in Seattle, Washington, United States, founded in 1973 by Pastor Patrinell Staten "Pat" Wright, who led the group until its dissolution in 2018. They have sung in at least 38 states and 22 countries, have performed for United States presidents Bill Clinton, Barack Obama, at the funeral of Jimi Hendrix in 1970, and made at least seven recordings of their own, as well as singing behind Barry Manilow at KeyArena in 2015, and on the song "Save Me" on Dave Matthews's CD Some Devil. They have appeared in television commercials ("to pay our bills") and on the public radio program A Prairie Home Companion as well as numerous other radio programs.

== Founding ==
Patrinell Wright was born in Carthage, Texas. Her father was a Baptist preacher and her mother a schoolteacher. She sang her first solo at the age of 3 and was directing two choirs in her father's church by her 14th birthday. She graduated as valedictorian from Turner High School in Carthage, Prairie View A&M University in Hempstead, Texas, and moved in 1964 to Seattle. She has had an extensive musical career in her own right, and since 1997 has been pastor of the Oneness Christian Center in Seattle, which she co-founded. Wright began the group in 1973 as a gospel music class at Seattle's public Franklin High School.

Pastor Wright has earned the nickname "The Idol Breeder" and has become once again uniquely distinguished after three of her choir members became finalists on the television series American Idol. Among its former members are American Idol contestant Sanjaya Malakar in 2007, 2004 contestant Leah LaBelle Vladowski, and 2002 contestant Karma Johnson.

Patrinell Wright died on August 30, 2022 at the age of 78 after a long illness.

== History ==
Since Hurricane Katrina hit the Gulf Coast Areas of Louisiana and Mississippi in August 2005, Pastor Wright dedicated many hours for hurricane relief work. One of her own teenage choir members and her younger brother were caught up in the hurricane while in South Mississippi visiting family. Upon their safe return to Seattle, Pastor Wright and the Total Experience Gospel Choir devoted themselves tirelessly to hurricane relief. They visited the areas in August 2006, April 2007, March 2008, August 2008 and August 2015 helping to rebuild lives and property. While there, they were featured on local television a number of times rebuilding, dedicating and celebrating with hurricane survivors during the various mission trips.

In 2018, the choir celebrated its 45th anniversary with a free concert at the Moore Theatre and the release of a documentary, Patrinell: The Total Experience, detailing Wright's life and the history of the choir. After that, Wright stepped down from her position as director and the choir was disbanded.
