= American Idol Rewind =

American television series

American Idol Rewind is a syndicated television series that ran from September 30, 2006 to May 15, 2010. The hour-long weekly series was a repurposed edition of the hit reality talent show American Idol, featuring present day interviews with the contestants, semi-finalists and rejected auditioners in addition to extra audition, Hollywood Week, and finals footage never previously aired. It featured the first five seasons of the original series.

In August 2006, the series was cleared for broadcast on stations in over 96 percent of the United States. In addition to local stations (including the cable-only CW Plus group of stations), the program formerly aired nationally over cable channel Superstation WGN/WGN America.

Starting Fall 2008, American Idol Rewind started airing encores a week later on TV Guide Network.

== Distributors ==
Until December 2007, "Rewind" was syndicated by Tribune Entertainment, which began a quick departure from the industry on December 18, 2007 as part of Tribune Company's oncoming bankruptcy. () As a result, its programs were being forced to find new distributors for their shows. Almost immediately after the closedown, American Idol's producers, Fremantle, transferred syndication and distribution to Trifecta Entertainment & Media.

== Season 1 (2006–2007) ==
The first season highlighted the same season of the original series.

A highlight of the audition episodes was the first-ever screening of Kelly Clarkson's full audition in Dallas, which never aired in the original run of the show. On the episode aired the weekend of October 14–15, Clarkson singing a portion of Madonna's "Express Yourself" was shown.

Brian Dunkleman, who was co-host with Ryan Seacrest season one but left under sour terms, adds new commentary.

== Season 2 (2007–2008) ==
The second season showcased the same season of the original series. The second season, described by the show's producers as "the year that put American Idol on the map with legendary talent and unprecedented ratings," introduced Ruben Studdard (winner), Clay Aiken (runner-up), Kimberley Locke, and Josh Gracin. Aiken provides the narration for this set of episodes.

== Season 3 & 4 (2008–2009) ==
The third edition of "Rewind" highlighted both the Third and Fourth Seasons of the original series. The first half showcased Season 3, where Fantasia Barrino won and Jennifer Hudson and Jasmine Trias were finalists, and the second half showcased Season 4 where Carrie Underwood was the winner.

The third season gained much notoriety during its original broadcast owing to alleged racism citing minimal voting results of the well-received African-American female singers. For reasons beyond control, the full-length performances from this season could not be syndicated, resulting its 16 week performances were bundled up in three weeks. The fourth season had minor edits as each episode doubles the weekly top performances due to limitations after cutting out most of the third season for this edition, yet was given a special episode on Carrie Underwood as the third edition's final episode.

Jason Kennedy narrates.

== Season 5 (2009–2010) ==
The fourth edition of Rewind featured the fifth season of American Idol, where Taylor Hicks won and Chris Daughtry was a finalist. Jason Kennedy returns to narrate.

Due to failed distribution with the show's music licensing, the series was quietly canceled after the final episodes aired in May 2010.

== Episodes ==
#	Episode	Air Date	Overview	Original Season
1	"Idol Phenomenon"	September 30, 2006	An overview of the series Season 1-5 and its overwhelming success.	Seasons One to Five
2	"Auditions 1"	October 7, 2006	The first of four episodes devoted to the audition stage. From Los Angeles.	Season One
3	"Auditions 2"	October 14, 2006	The second of four episodes devoted to the audition stage. From Chicago and Dallas.	Season One
4	"Auditions 3"	October 21, 2006	The third of four episodes devoted to the audition stage. From Atlanta and Seattle.	Season One
5	"Auditions 4"	October 28, 2006	The fourth of four episodes devoted to the audition stage. From New York and Miami.	Season One
6	"Auditions 5"	November 4, 2006	A recap of the auditions in a "Best Of" format.	Season One
7	"Hollywood Week 1"	November 11, 2006	A showcase of the first week's events in Hollywood.	Season One
8	"Hollywood Week 2"	November 18, 2006	A showcase of the second week's events in Hollywood.	Season One
9	"Story So Far"	November 25, 2006	A showcase of the auditions and the Hollywood rounds	Season One
10	"Top 30: 1"	February 3, 2007	The first group of 10 perform for the judges and America.	Season One
11	"Top 30: 2"	February 10, 2007	The second group of 10 perform for the judges and America	Season One
12	"Top 30: 3"	February 17, 2007	The third group of 10 perform for the judges and America	Season One
13	"Wild Card"	February 24, 2007	The judges pick the 5 best performers from all three nights and they perform for the judges for one last chance to be chosen for the top 10	Season One
14	"CBS 10 to 8"	March 3, 2007	The Top 10 sing hits of Motown; 10 will become 8	Season One
15	"CBS 8 to 7"	March 10, 2007	The Top 8 sing hits of the 60's; 8 will become 7	Season One
16	"CBS 7 to 6"	March 17, 2007	The Top 7 sing hits of the 70's; 7 will become 6	Season One
17	"CBS 6 to 5"	March 24, 2007	The Top 6 sing songs of Big band; 6 will become 5	Season One
18	"Road to the Top 5"	March 31, 2007	The Top 5 recount on their experience with the show	Season One
19	"CBS 5 to 4"	April 7, 2007	The Top 5 sing love songs; 5 will become 4	Season One
20	"CBS 4 to 3"	April 14, 2007	The Top 4 sing hits of the '80s and '90s; 4 will become 3	Season One
21	"CBS 3 to 2"	April 21, 2007	The Top 3 sings one song of their own Choice and Judges' Choice; 3 will become 2	Season One
22	"Finale Performance"	April 28, 2007	The Top 2 finalists sing two new songs and one previous one, Pop Idol winner Will Young performs.	Season One
23	"Finale Pre-Performance"	May 5, 2007	Backstage Pre-Show, the Top 10 Finalists sing a '60s Medley.	Season One
24	"Finale Results"	May 12, 2007	The winner is revealed based on America's votes, The Top 10 Return for a Motown Medley.	Season One
25	"Kelly & Justin"	May 19, 2007	A look at the journeys of Kelly and Justin during the season.	Season One
26	"Where Are They Now?"	May 26, 2007	The Top 10.	Season One
27	"NY Auditions"	September 29, 2007	Auditions in New York plus an overview of the season 2 auditions.	Season Two
28	"Miami/Detroit Auditions"	October 6, 2007	Auditions in Miami and Detroit.	Season Two
29	"Atlanta Auditions"	October 13, 2007	Auditions in Atlanta.	Season Two
30	"Austin Auditions"	October 20, 2007	Auditions in Austin.	Season Two
31	"L.A. Auditions"	October 27, 2007	Auditions in L.A.	Season Two
32	"Nashville Auditions"	November 3, 2007	Auditions in Nashville.	Season Two
33	"Hollywood Week 1"	November 10, 2007	Showcase of the first week events in Hollywood.	Season Two
34	"Hollywood Week 2"	November 17, 2007	Showcase of the second week events in Hollywood.	Season Two
35	"Best of the Worst"	November 24, 2007	Showcase from the worst auditions in all seven cities.	Season Two
36	"Top 32 Group 1"	January 5, 2008	The first group of 8 perform for the judges and America.	Season Two
37	"Top 32 Group 2"	January 12, 2008	The second group of 8 perform for the judges and America.	Season Two
38	"Top 32 Group 3"	January 19, 2008	The third group of 8 perform for the judges and America.	Season Two
39	"Top 32 Group 4"	January 26, 2008	The fourth group of 8 perform for the judges and America.	Season Two
40	"Wildcard Show"	February 2, 2008	Nine previously eliminated contestants perform for the judges and America for their last chance of making the top 12.	Season Two
41	"Top 12 to 11"	February 9, 2008	The Final 12 perform songs of Motown; Guest judge Lamont Dozier; 12 will become 11.	Season Two
42	"Top 11 to 10"	February 16, 2008	The Final 11 perform songs from the movies; Guest judge Gladys Knight; 11 will become 10.	Season Two
43	"Top 10 to 9"	February 23, 2008	The Final 10 perform Country Rock songs; Guest judge Olivia Newton-John; 10 will become 9.	Season Two
44	"Top 9 to 8"	March 1, 2008	One contestant is disqualified; the remaining 8 perform Disco songs; Guest judge Verdine White; Nobody is voted off.	Season Two
45	"Top 8 to 7"	March 8, 2008	The Final 8 sing Billboard Number Ones; Guest judge Lionel Richie; 8 will become 7.	Season Two
46	"Top 7 to 6"	March 15, 2008	The Final 7 sing songs of Billy Joel; Guest judge Smokey Robinson; 7 will become 6.	Season Two
47	"Top 6 to 5"	March 22, 2008.	The Final 6 sing the songs of Diane Warren; Guest judge Diane Warren; 6 will become 5.	Season Two
48	"Top 5 to 4"	March 29, 2008	The Final 5 sing the songs of the 60's and songs of Neil Sedaka; Guest judge Neil Sedaka; 5 will become 4.	Season Two
49	"Top 4 to 3"	April 5, 2008	The Final 4 sing the songs of the Bee Gees; Guest judge Robin Gibb; 4 will become 3.	Season Two
50	"Top 3 to 2"	April 12, 2008	The Final 3 sing one song chosen randomly, one chosen by the judges, and one they chose; 3 will become 2.	Season Two
51	"Final 2"	April 19, 2008	The finalists return; The Top 2 are interviewed and their journey on the show is looked at; The judges answer questions.	Season Two
52	"Finale"	April 26, 2008	The Top 2 Perform 2 songs each; The winner is revealed.	Season Two
53	"New York Auditions"	September 27, 2008	Season 3 Auditions in New York.	Season Three
54	"Atlanta Auditions"	October 4, 2008	Auditions in Atlanta.	Season Three
55	"LA/SF Auditions"	October 11, 2008	Auditions in Los Angeles and San Francisco	Season Three
56	"Houston-Hawaii Auditions"	October 18, 2008	Auditions in Houston and Hawaii.	Season Three
57	"Top 12 Journeys"	October 25, 2008	The Top 12 go through Hollywood week and Semifinals.	Season Three
58	"12 to 6 Performances & Results"	November 1, 2008	A recap of the first six weeks of finals.	Season Three
59	"6 to Finale: Performances & Results"	November 8, 2008	The final weeks of the competition.	Season Three
60	"DC Auditions"	November 15, 2008	Season 4 Auditions in Washington, D.C., guest judge Mark McGrath.	Season Four
61	"St. Louis Auditions"	November 22, 2008	Auditions in St. Louis.	Season Four
62	"Cleveland/Orlando Auditions"	January 31, 2009	Auditions in Cleveland and Orlando, guest judge LL Cool J.	Season Four
63	"New Orleans Auditions"	February 7, 2009	Auditions in New Orleans, guest judge Gene Simmons.	Season Four
64	"Las Vegas Auditions"	February 14, 2009	Auditions in Las Vegas, guest judge Kenny Loggins.	Season Four
65	"San Francisco Auditions"	February 21, 2009	Auditions in San Francisco, guest judge Brandy.	Season Four
66	"S4 Hollywood Week"	February 28, 2009	Contestants continue auditions in Hollywood.	Season Four
67	"S4 Semifinals"	March 7, 2009	24 Semifinalists, 12 guys and 12 girls, are cut down to the Top 12 Finalists.	Season Four
68	"S4 Top 12 to Top 10"	March 14, 2009	The Top 12 perform songs from the 60's, 12 will become 11; The Top 11 perform Billboard Number Ones, 11 will become 10.	Season Four
69	"S4 Top 10 to Top 8"	March 21, 2009	The Top 10 perform songs of the 90's, 10 will become 9; The Top 9 perform songs from Broadway, 9 will become 8.	Season Four
70	"S4 Top 8 to Top 6"	March 28, 2009	The Top 8 perform songs from the year they were born, 8 will become 7; The Top 7 perform 70's dance music, 7 will become 6.	Season Four
71	"S4 Top 6 to 4"	May 2, 2009	The Top 6 sing songs from the 2000s, 6 will become 5; The Top 5 sing songs from Leiber and Stoller and the current Billboard Chart, 5 will become 4.	Season Four
72	"S4 Top 4 to 2"	May 9, 2009	The Top 4 sing country songs and songs from Gamble and Huff, 4 will become 3; The Top 3 sing a song of their choice, a song chosen by the judges, and a song chosen by Clive Davis, guest judge Clive Davis, The Top 2 are revealed.	Season Four
73	"S4 Finale; Results"	May 16, 2009	The Final 2 perform; the winner is revealed.	Season Four
74	"Carrie Underwood Special"	May 23, 2009	The journey of Carrie Underwood.	Season Four
75	"S5 Chicago Auditions"	September 26, 2009	Season 5 Auditions in Chicago.	Season Five
76	"S5 Greensboro Auditions"	October 3, 2009	Auditions in Greensboro.	Season Five
77	"S5 Las Vegas-Austin Auditions"	October 10, 2009	Auditions in Las Vegas and Austin.	Season Five
78	"S5 Denver Auditions"	October 17, 2009	Auditions in Denver.	Season Five
79	"S5 Boston Auditions"	October 24, 2009	Auditions in Boston.	Season Five
80	"S5 San Francisco Auditions"	October 31, 2009	Auditions in San Francisco.	Season Five
81	"S5 Hollywood Week"	November 7, 2009	Contestants perform and are eliminated in Hollywood.	Season Five
82	"S5 Top 12"	November 14, 2009	The Top 12 sing the songs of Stevie Wonder; 12 will become 11.	Season Five
83	"S5 Top 11"	November 21, 2009	The Top 11 sing songs from the 1950s; 11 will become 10.	Season Five
84	"S5 Top 10"	January 30, 2010	The Top 10 sing songs from the 2000s; 10 will become 9.	Season Five
85	"S5 Top 9"	February 6, 2010	The Top 9 sing country songs; 9 will become 8.	Season Five
86	"S5 Top 8"	February 13, 2010	The Top 8 sing the songs of Queen; 8 will become 7.	Season Five
87	"S5 Top 7"	February 20, 2010	The Top 7 sing songs from the Great American Songbook; 7 will become 6.	Season Five
88	"Chris Daughtry Special"	February 27, 2010	The journey of Chris Daughtry.	Season Five
89	"S5 Top 6"	March 6, 2010	The Top 6 sing love songs; 6 will become 5.	Season Five
90	"S5 Top 5"	March 13, 2010	The Top 5 sing songs from the year they were born and songs from the current Billboard chart; 5 will become 4.	Season Five
91	"S5 Top 4"	May 1, 2010	The Top 4 sing the songs of Elvis Presley; 4 will become 3.	Season Five
92	"S5 Top 3"	May 8, 2010	The Top 3 sing one song chosen by Clive Davis, one chosen by the judges, and one they chose; 3 will become 2.	Season Five
93	"S5 Finale/Results"	May 15, 2010	The Top 2 perform; The winner is revealed.	Season Five
