= George Huff (singer) =

American singer (born 1980)

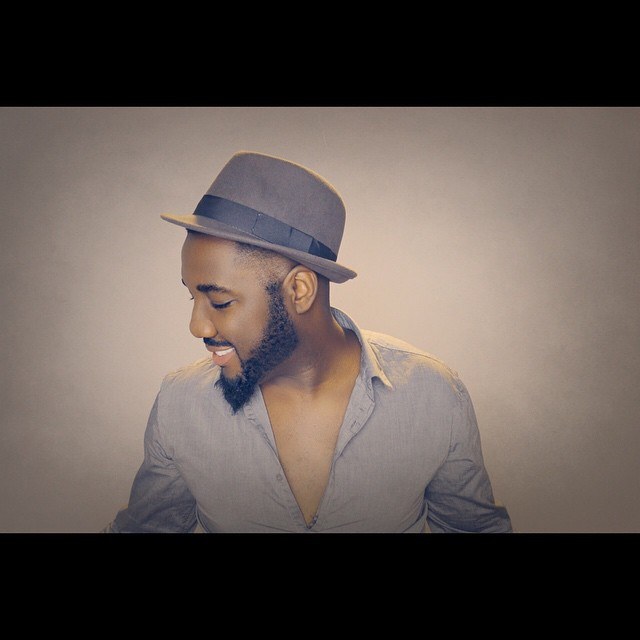

Background information
- Born: George Clayton Huff Jr. November 4, 1980 (age 45); New Orleans, Louisiana, United States
- Genres: Gospel, R&B
- Occupation: Singer-songwriter
- Instrument: Vocals
- Years active: 2004–present
- Labels: Word Entertainment (2004–2008); Koch Records (2009–present)

George Clayton Huff, Jr. (born November 4, 1980) is an American singer. He placed first among male contestants and overall fifth-place finalist on the third season of the reality/talent-search television series American Idol.

== Biography ==
Huff is originally from New Orleans, Louisiana. Huff auditioned for the third season of American Idol in Houston, Texas; he was a member of the fourth group of semi-finalists. He was actually not among those originally chosen for the semi-final round, but was put through when contestant Donnie Williams was disqualified for a drunk driving arrest.

== American Idol ==
Huff was not voted through to the final round from his group of semi-finalists, but got another second chance when he was brought back for the wildcard round and put through as a finalist by contest judge Simon Cowell. During this period, New Orleans Fox Affiliate WVUE would hold specials including Huff's family cheering George on during the latest episodes.

On May 5, 2004, Huff was voted off in fifth place after two renditions of Fred Astaire's "Cheek to Cheek" and Louis Armstrong's "What a Wonderful World" during big band week.

=== American Idol performances ===
Week/Theme	Date Sung	Song Sung	Artist	Status
Semi-finals [N/A]	March 2, 2004	"Always and Forever"	Heatwave	Eliminated
Wild Card [N/A]	March 9, 2004	"Lean on Me"	Bill Withers	Selected
Top 12; Soul week	March 16, 2004	"(Sittin' On) The Dock of the Bay"	Otis Redding	Safe
Top 11; Country week	March 23, 2004	"I Can Love You Like That"	John Michael Montgomery	Safe
Top 10; Motown week	March 30, 2004	"Ain't Too Proud to Beg"	The Temptations	Safe
Top 9 Elton John	April 6, 2004	"Take Me to the Pilot"	Elton John	Safe
Top 8 Cinema	April 14, 2004	"Against All Odds (Take a Look at Me Now)": from "Against All Odds"	Phil Collins	Safe
Top 7 Barry Manilow	April 20, 2004	"Tryin' to Get the Feeling Again"	Barry Manilow	Safe
Top 6 Gloria Estefan	April 27, 2004	"Live for Loving You"	Gloria Estefan	Bottom 2
Top 5 Big band week	May 4, 2004	"Cheek to Cheek" "What a Wonderful World"	Fred Astaire; Louis Armstrong	Eliminated

== After Idol ==
His album, Miracles, was released by Word Records, on October 11, 2005. The first single off that album was "Brighter Day". It sold 18,000 copies.

In 2005, his Louisiana home was affected by Hurricane Katrina. He left New Orleans and stayed at his brother's house in Dallas. His recent performances have included an October 2006 concert at West Virginia University and a December 2006 Christmas show in Salinas, California. He also had a recent brief performance at New York's Dr. Susan S. Mckinney Secondary School for the Arts on November 10, 2008.

In 2007 Huff's song "Brighter Day" was briefly featured in Tyler Perry's movie "Why Did I Get Married?" starring Janet Jackson.

On April 7, 2009 George Huff released his self-titled sophomore effort, featuring the songs "I Belong To You(Yours)", "Victory", "Free", "Destiny" (featuring Coko of SWV and Tasha Collins from the first season of BET's Sunday Best) and the lead single "Don't Let Go".

On March 24, 2011, Huff performed as a back-up singer to longtime friend and fellow Idol alum Jennifer Hudson during the third week of finals on the tenth season of American Idol, where she performed her current album's lead single, "Where You At." Huff has been singing background vocals for many of Hudson's live performances since then, and works as her vocal arranger for live performances.

== Discography ==
=== Albums ===
Year	Album details	Peak chart positions			Certifications (sales threshold)
Year	Album details	US Christ	US Gospel	US Heat	Certifications (sales threshold)
2004	My Christmas EP!: Released: November 9, 2004; Label: n/a	–	8	43	US sales: 19,000
2005	Miracles: Released: October 11, 2005; Label: Word Records	30	8	21	US sales: 29,000
2009	George Huff: Released: April 7, 2009; Label: Koch Records	–	–	–	US sales: 4,000
"—" denotes releases that did not chart

=== Singles ===
- Go Tell It on the Mountain
- A Brighter Day
- Miracles
- You Know Me (Number 32 Hot Gospel Songs)
- Don't Let Go
