= John Stevens (singer) =

American singer

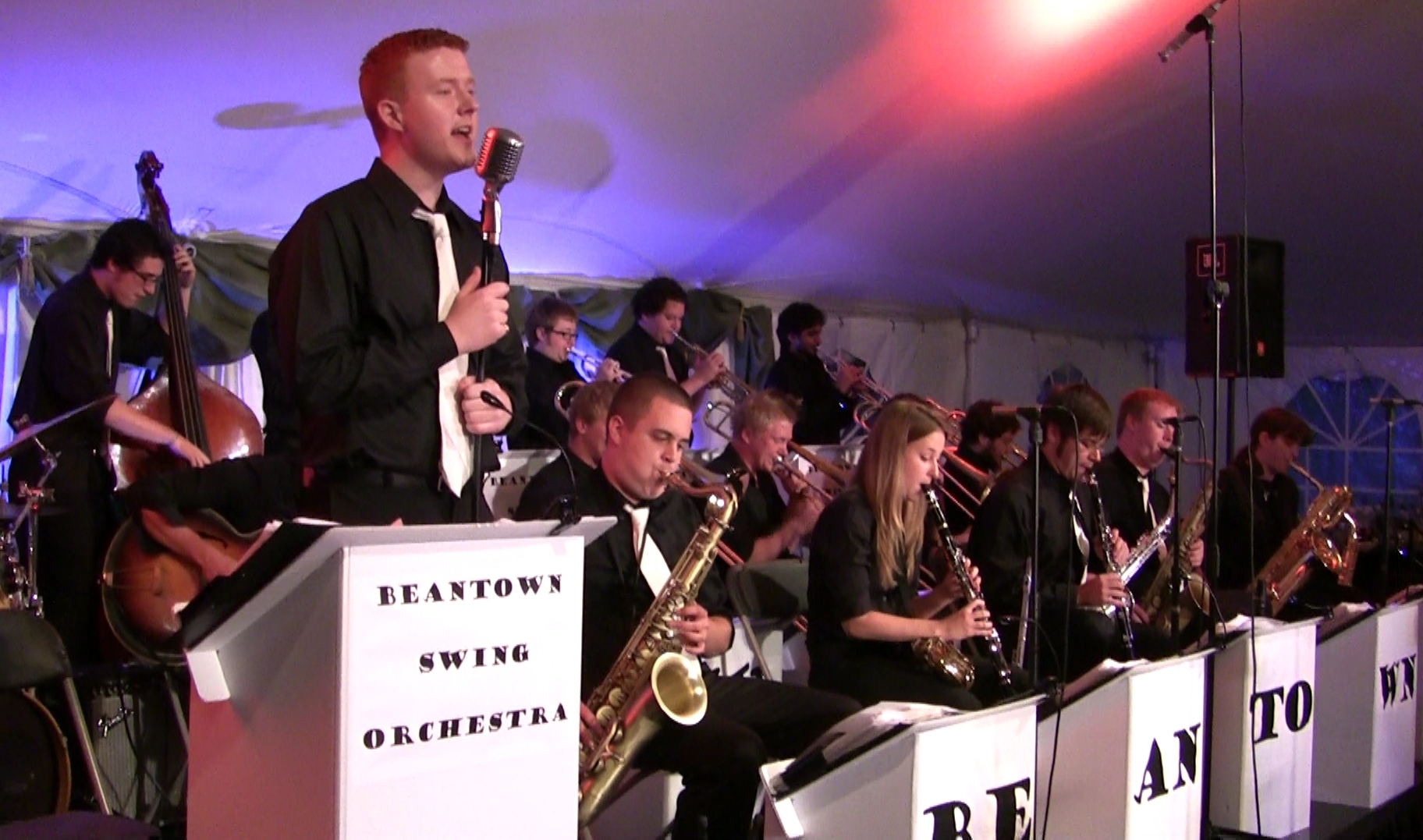
- John Stevens with the Beantown Swing Orchestra in 2009

Background information
- Born: John Basset Stevens IV; July 28, 1987 (age 39)
- Origin: Buffalo, New York, United States
- Genres: Swing, big band, traditional pop
- Occupations: Singer, composer
- Instrument: Vocals
- Years active: 2004–present
- Label: Maverick Records (2005)
- Website: www.johnstevensband.com

John Basset Stevens IV (born July 28, 1987) is an American classic pop singer and was the sixth-place finalist on the third season of American Idol.

== Biography ==
Stevens was born in Buffalo, New York, and his permanent residence is in nearby East Amherst. He attended Williamsville East High School and sang in a select jazz group. He auditioned for American Idol in New York City, singing "That's Amore" as an impression of Dean Martin. When the judges asked him to sing in his normal voice, he performed "The Way You Look Tonight" and was sent through to the next round.

Stevens was a member of the fourth group of semifinalists. He finished first in the voting among his group of eight semifinalists, earning 28% of the vote. At 16, he was one of the youngest contestants to make the finals on American Idol.

Stevens' favorite singer is Frank Sinatra, to whom his vocal style has been compared. He has also earned the nickname "Teen Martin" because of his Dean Martin impersonation and ability to croon at such a young age. Stevens' style was not typical Idol fare, causing him to struggle with unfamiliar genres during the competition.

For "Country Week," Stevens sang "King of the Road." During "Elton John Week," he performed "Crocodile Rock."

The last week in April 2004 was "Latin Week," a tribute to the music of Gloria Estefan. Stevens performed "Music of My Heart," and Simon Cowell credited Stevens with "taking every bullet thrown at you like a man." The next day, Stevens was voted off the show, coming in sixth place despite receiving over four million votes.

Stevens was signed to Maverick Records and released his debut album Red on June 28, 2005. It was produced by Steve Tyrell and executive produced by David Foster. It features covers of The Beatles' "Here, There and Everywhere" and Maroon 5's "This Love," both arranged and performed in a relaxed jazz/lounge style. Its first week sales put it into the top 10 of the Billboard jazz charts. It sold 18,000 copies as of March 2006. He and Maverick Records have since parted ways.

Stevens graduated from the Berklee College of Music in Boston, Massachusetts, in May 2009 and released a Christmas album, "Home for Christmas," on November 1, 2009.

Stevens currently sings with the Boston-based Beantown Swing Orchestra, focusing on the classic big band arrangements that were originally performed by Frank Sinatra and Bobby Darin.

Stevens sang "My Way" at the funeral of former Boston Mayor Thomas Menino on November 3, 2014.

== Discography ==
=== Albums ===
Year	Album details	Peak positions		Certifications (sales threshold)
Year	Album details	US Jazz	US Heat	Certifications (sales threshold)
2005	Red: Released: June 28, 2005; Label: Maverick Records; Format: CD	8	17	US sales: 21,000
2009	Home for Christmas: Released: November 1, 2009			
2015	Mr. Nice Guy: Released: May 1, 2015			
