= Camile Velasco =

Filipino American singer

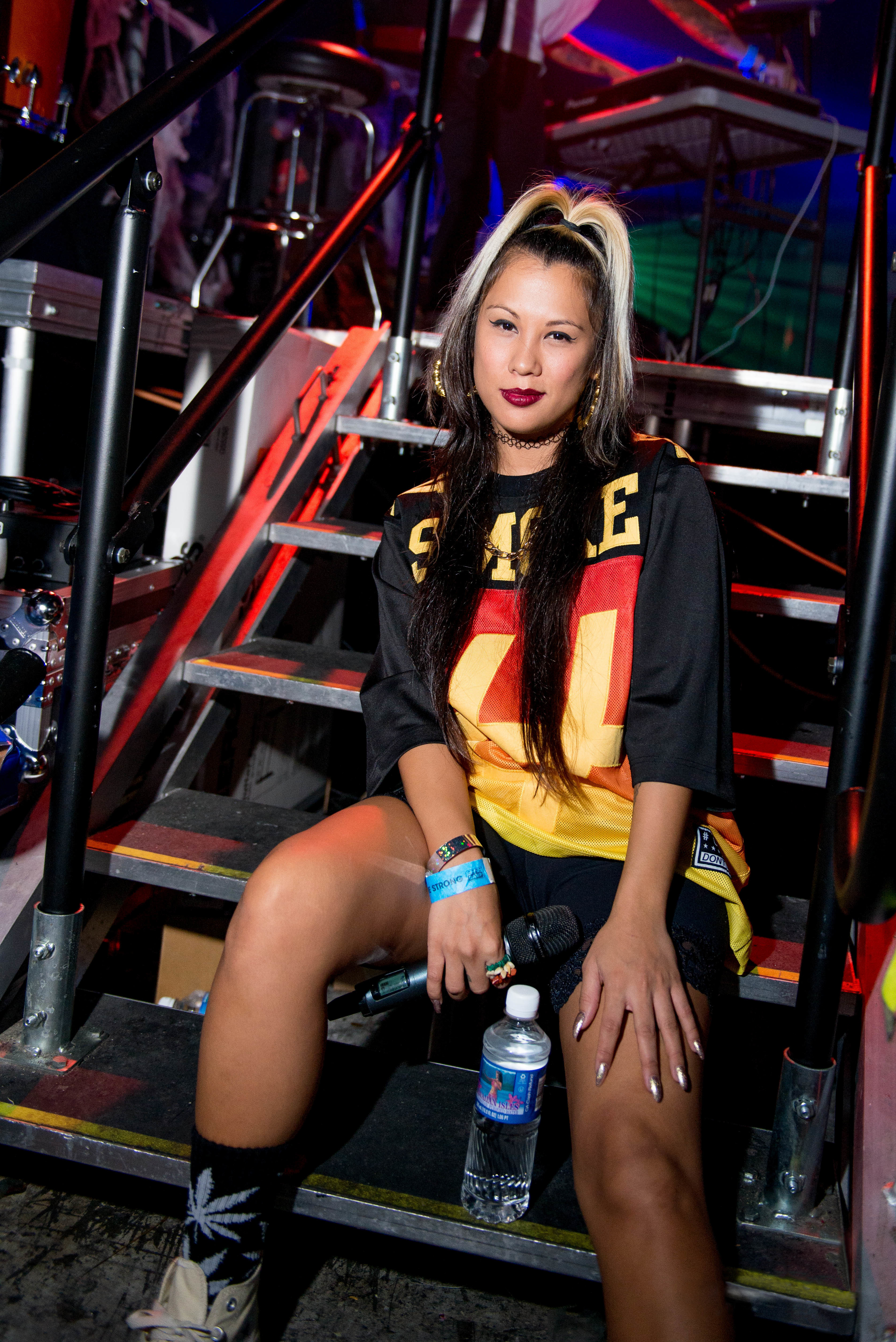
- Camile Velasco performing at The Republik in Honolulu, Hawaii, November 1, 2014

Background information
- Also known as: Eli-Mac
- Born: Ciara-Camile Roque Velasco; September 1, 1985 (age 40); Makati, Philippines
- Origin: Maui, Hawaii, U.S.
- Genres: Reggae

Ciara-Camile "Camile" Roque Velasco (born September 1, 1985), known by her stage name Eli-Mac, is a Filipino-American singer and came in ninth place on the third season of the reality/talent-search television series American Idol. She is one-quarter Irish, one-quarter Spanish, and half Filipino.

== Early life ==
Born in Makati, Philippines, Camile Velasco's family later moved to Haiku, Maui, Hawaii. Prior to American Idol, Velasco was a struggling songwriter who worked at her parents' IHOP Restaurant in Kahului.

== Career ==
=== American Idol 3 contestant ===
In 2003, Velasco auditioned for American Idol in Honolulu, Oahu and was unanimously accepted by the judges for her rendition of the chorus and bridge of "Ready or Not"—a Delfonics-sampled classic by the Fugees.

In the Hollywood round, Velasco sang several songs solo and performed "You Can't Hurry Love" in a group. She was eventually advanced to the Top 32, in the second group of semi-finalists. Before she left the stage, Randy Jackson requested that she infuse more of her hip-hop style into her next performance. Velasco was as the top vote-getter in her group and advanced to the finals.

On American Idol, Velasco's trademark was a red, yellow and green Rasta wristband, which she continually wore on her left wrist. Velasco also wore the 3rd Eye Vision logo of the Hieroglyphics, a San Francisco Bay Area hip-hop crew, on several occasions.

Vocally, Velasco was classified as being hip-hop—a culture and style she identified with (but was not limited to). In the competition, she was compared with Lauryn Hill. In the Top 12 finals, she sang "Son of a Preacher Man", "Desperado", "For Once in My Life", and "Goodbye Yellow Brick Road".

=== Leaving American Idol ===
Velasco was eliminated from American Idol on April 7, 2004. She, Diana DeGarmo and Jasmine Trias, a fellow Filipino-American, had received the fewest votes during Elton John week. Velasco seemed to anticipate her departure. Velasco kept her composure as her name was announced, but began to cry during her dedication video. As the show ended, the remaining finalists encircled her in an embrace.

When Velasco's friend, Fantasia Barrino, won the competition, the Top 10 of American Idol 3 began to prepare for a US tour, sponsored by Pop Tarts, which would consist of more than fifty shows across the country, and a few overseas. On the tour, Velasco sang "Ex Factor". She also sang solo during group covers of "When Doves Cry", "Heartburn", "Crazy in Love", and "Ain't No Mountain High Enough". Velasco later reflected that the tour was an amazing experience, and it had raised her confidence immensely.

After American Idol, Velasco went to the Philippines to perform at a Christmas concert with Martin Nievera. She performed with South Border, Billy Crawford, and several others. When she returned to the US, Velasco settled in Los Angeles, California, and began to work in the studio, and study music and writing at the Musician's Institute in Hollywood.

=== Solo career ===
In 2005, Velasco headlined a variety of gigs after signing with Universal/Motown Records. In the first half of the year, she performed at the Pro Bowl Concert in Hawaii; the Yeah Baby! Expo in Anaheim, a two-day concert for the 50th State Fair in Oahu; and in Phoenix and San Diego, where she sang the national anthem. Velasco also made appearances on American Idol and at the Gen Ex LA Fashion Week. When her first single, "Hangin' On" was released, her demand increased, especially in the Filipino-American music scene. This led to several headlining concerts, including the two-day Fil-Am Unity Jam (A Night with Camile Velasco) 3-Style Attractions, Jam Sessions, and Lumpiapalooza 2 in California, as well as a concert with Gary Valenciano and IBU in Chicago. One of Velasco's more notable television appearances was a live performance on the TFC series World Musikahan with host Ryan Cayabyab, which aired in October. In 2005, she also got her first spot on a magazine cover for the Arizona Republic's Yes magazine.

In 2006, Velasco parted with Motown Records, but continued to perform around the US. In January, she made a rare East Coast appearance in New York, and made an announcement at a press conference that she would be joining the Filipino band Aegis for a US tour. Throughout the year, Velasco made appearances on American Idol and the Idol Tonight segment. She also performed enthusiastically in Hawaii, almost once a month. On her Myspace page, Velasco chose to release a new song-in-the-making, entitled "Da Da Da", that was met with a positive response from fans. In July, she took part in the filming of the Black Eyed Peas' "Bebot" video. Also, in September alone, Velasco performed at a two-day concert and birthday celebration for her and her manager, she was a featured act at the Festival of Philippine Arts and Culture in San Pedro, California, she was interviewed on LA TV, and she performed with fellow Idol alumnus, Jasmine Trias, in Maui. By the end of 2006, she performed with IBU in Las Vegas, and briefly returned to the Philippines for a concert with apl.de.ap.

In the first week of February 2007, Velasco had the honor of opening for her idol Lauryn Hill at the Bob Marley Fest in Kapolei, HI.

Velasco took an extended break from performing in June 2007 after the Fiesta Filipinas in Oxnard, California, to further concentrate on songwriting and finishing her debut album.

As of April 2008, Velasco premiered a weekly show on YouTube titled CamileTV, with a new episode every Friday. Shows were usually 2 to 3 minutes and included personal moments, performing live, playing instruments, and singing covers of pop, rock, jazz, and soul songs. Once CamileTV was launched, she began to perform once again. Her most notable appearance was at the APIA Vote seminar in May 2008 featuring Asian-American rapper KeyKool of the Visionaries.

In the fourth quarter of 2008, she appeared on American Idol Rewind, which re-runs episodes from the third season of the television series with recent interviews of past contestants.

Her single "Guava Jelly" was produced by Stephen Marley and released onto iTunes on October 14, 2008. It received the Hawaii Music Awards' Single of the Year in April 2009. It was to be her first single off her debut album titled Koy, which was originally scheduled to be released in 2009 but has yet to be released. Her next single "Super Star" was released in Japan in 2010.

In 2013, she appeared on the track "All My Time" on Cheesa's debut album, Naked. In 2014, she officially announced that she would be performing professionally under the stage name, Eli-Mac. In October 2014, she released her EP, Dubstop.

== Credits ==
=== Songs performed on American Idol (televised) ===
- "Ready or Not" – The Fugees Audition
- "One Last Cry" – Brian McKnight Semi-finals, 2nd Group
- "Son of a Preacher Man" – Dusty Springfield Soul Week
- "Desperado" – Eagles Country Week
- "For Once in My Life" – Stevie Wonder Motown Week
- "Goodbye Yellow Brick Road" – Elton John Elton John Week

== Discography ==
=== Albums ===
- Dub Stop EP (October 31, 2014)
- Tricky One EP (2018)

=== Singles ===
- 2005: "Hangin On"
- 2008: "Guava Jelly" (feat. Stephen Marley)
- 2010: "Super Star" (Japan only)
- 2013: "All My Time" (with Cheesa, A2 C & Mike B)
- 2014: "Dub Stop"
- 2015: "You Don't Say"
- 2017: "Mr. Sensi"
- 2018: "Can't Get Enough"

=== Mixtape ===
Confirmed tracks:

- Gangstarr's "Moment of Truth"
