= American Idol season 3 =

American Idol
- Season 3
- Hosted by: Ryan Seacrest
- Judges: Paula Abdul; Simon Cowell; Randy Jackson
- Winner: Fantasia Barrino
- Runner-up: Diana DeGarmo
- Finals venue: Kodak Theatre

Release
- Original network: Fox
- Original release: January 19 – May 26, 2004

Season chronology
- ← Previous; Season 2 Next → Season 4

The third season of American Idol premiered on Monday, January 19, 2004, and continued until May 26, 2004. The third season was won by Fantasia Barrino, who defeated Diana DeGarmo by an approximate margin of 2% (1.3 million votes); the vote total (65 million votes) was then the highest recorded vote total in the show's history. This season also featured future EGOT winner Jennifer Hudson, who finished seventh in the competition.

Both Fantasia and Diana DeGarmo released a single after the finale. Fantasia's first single, released in June 2004 on the RCA record label, entered the Billboard Hot 100 at number one, making Fantasia the first artist in the history of Billboard to debut at number one with their first single. In addition to Fantasia and Diana DeGarmo, Jasmine Trias, LaToya London, George Huff, Jennifer Hudson, and Camile Velasco all released albums since the season ended. The season is also, to date, the only season in the show's history to produce multiple Grammy Award winners, courtesy of Fantasia (in 2011) and Hudson (in 2009 and 2017), as well as produce an Academy Award and Tony Award winner, courtesy of Hudson (in 2007 and 2022, respectively).

== Changes from previous seasons ==
Unlike previous seasons, the top thirty-two contestants for this season performed in front of a small studio audience with orchestral accompaniment on a backing tape. This was also the first season to feature two guest judges in one week: the duo Ashford & Simpson appeared during the top 10 week.

== Regional auditions ==
Auditions were held in the summer of 2003 in the following cities:

American Idol (season 3) – regional auditions
City	Preliminary date	Preliminary venue	Filming date(s)	Filming venue	Golden tickets
Los Angeles, California	August 3, 2003	Rose Bowl	September 2003	Renaissance Hollywood Hotel	25
Houston, Texas	August 13, 2003	Minute Maid Park	September 4–5, 2003	InterContinental Houston	13
Atlanta, Georgia	August 20, 2003	Georgia Dome	September 2003	Atlanta Convention Center at AmericasMart	24
New York City, New York	August 25, 2003	Jacob K. Javits Convention Center	August 29, 2003	Waldorf-Astoria Hotel	29
San Francisco, California	September 22, 2003	Pac Bell Park	September 2003	Renaissance Parc 55 Hotel	10
Honolulu, Hawaii	September 30, 2003	Aloha Stadium	October 4–5, 2003	Sheraton Waikiki Hotel	17
Total number of tickets to Hollywood					118

In this season, over 80,000 attended the auditions in 6 cities. A prominent audition was William Hung, a University of California, Berkeley student, who became a surprise cult figure following his tuneless rendition of Ricky Martin's "She Bangs" at the San Francisco audition. He was later invited back to perform on a special edition "Uncut, Uncensored and Untalented." His appearance on the show landed him a record deal with Koch Records and he released an album soon afterwards.

== Hollywood week ==
There were 117 contestants in the first Hollywood round which was held at the Pasadena Civic Center in Pasadena, California. The contestants first came onto the stage in groups, but each performed solo. They were also asked to write original lyrics and melody for one of ten song titles given and perform their song the next day. After their performances, they were divided into four groups and one group was eliminated.

In the next round, the top 87 contestants performed in groups in three. The women and the men were separate and they were each given three different songs to choose: the women had The Supremes' "You Can't Hurry Love," Vonda Shepard's "Tell Him," or Candi Staton's "Young Hearts Run Free"; the men had Billy Joel's "Tell Her About It," Rick Astley's "Never Gonna Give You Up," or The Drifters's "Up on the Roof." 30 contestants were cut and 57 then advanced to the next stage where they performed solo. The contestants were then divided into three groups and placed in separate rooms, with one group sent home. 32 contestants remained for the top thirty-two.

== Top 32 ==
George Huff replaced Donnie Williams after the latter was disqualified, following a DUI arrest.

Unlike previous seasons, the contestants this season performed in front of a small studio audience with orchestral accompaniment on a backing tape. As with the second season, two performers from each group were selected by public vote to proceed on to the top 12, and those who failed at any of the previous stages were given a second chance in the Wild Card round.

During the Wild Card round, twelve contestants were invited back to participate. However, after being evaluated during the week in rehearsals, only eight were chosen by the judges to perform that night. One performer was chosen by public vote, and one performer was chosen by each of the three judges.

Four contestants in the wildcard round were eliminated by the judges before they had the chance to sing: Lisa Leuschner, Eric Yoder, Tiara Purifoy, and Marque Lynche were those contestants.

Color key:

This contestant was chosen by the public to advance.
This contestant was not chosen by the public, and had to perform again for the judges.
This contestant was not chosen by the public, but was chosen by the judges as a Wild Card pick.
This contestant was eliminated.

Contestants are listed in the order they performed.

=== Group 1 (February 11) ===
Contestant	Song	Result
Diana DeGarmo	"I've Got the Music in Me"	Safe (2nd)
Marque Lynche	"Wind Beneath My Wings"	Eliminated
Ashley Thomas	"Crazy"	Eliminated
Katie Webber	"Orange Colored Sky"	Wild Card
Erskine Walcott	"Open Arms"	Eliminated
Jennifer Hudson	"Imagine"	Wild Card
Matthew Metzger	"Walking in Memphis"	Wild Card (3rd)
Fantasia Barrino	"Something to Talk About"	Safe (1st)

=== Group 2 (February 18) ===
Contestant	Song	Result
Matthew Rogers	"What You Won't Do for Love"	Safe (2nd)
Briana Ramirez-Rial	"Don't Know Why"	Eliminated
Noel Roman	"This I Promise You"	Eliminated
Kara Master	"I'm Outta Love"	Eliminated
Lisa Leuschner	"Sweet Thing"	Eliminated (3rd)
Jesus Roman	"Back at One"	Eliminated
Camile Velasco	"One Last Cry"	Safe (1st)
Marisa Joy	"Some Kind of Wonderful"	Eliminated

=== Group 3 (February 25) ===
Contestant	Song	Result
Elizabeth LeTendre	"I Wanna Dance with Somebody (Who Loves Me)"	Wild Card
Eric Yoder	"In the Still of the Night"	Eliminated
Amy Adams	"The Power of Love"	Safe (2nd)
Jon Peter Lewis	"Tiny Dancer"	Wild Card (3rd)
Charly Lowry	"Chain of Fools"	Eliminated
Jonah Moananu	"I Wish"	Eliminated
Leah LaBelle	"I Have Nothing"	Wild Card
LaToya London	"All by Myself"	Safe (1st)

=== Group 4 (March 3) ===
Contestant	Song	Result
Suzy Vulaca	"Un-Break My Heart"	Wild Card
John Preator	"That's What Love Is All About"	Eliminated
Heather Piccinini	"New Attitude"	Eliminated
John Stevens	"She's Always a Woman"	Safe (1st)
Jasmine Trias	"Run to You"	Safe (2nd)
George Huff	"Always and Forever"	Wild Card (3rd)
Lisa Wilson	"Come to My Window"	Eliminated
Tiara Purifoy	"I Wanna Dance with Somebody (Who Loves Me)"	Eliminated

=== Wild Card round (March 10) ===
Contestants are listed in the order they performed.

Contestant	Song	Result
Jon Peter Lewis	"A Little Less Conversation"	Saved
Elizabeth LeTendre	"The First Time Ever I Saw Your Face"	Eliminated
Katie Webber	"So Emotional"	Eliminated
George Huff	"Lean on Me"	Saved (Note: Simon Cowell's Wild Card choice)
Suzy Vulaca	"I Will Survive"	Eliminated
Matthew Metzger	"When I See You Smile"	Eliminated
Leah LaBelle	"Let's Stay Together"	Saved (Note: Paula Abdul's Wild Card choice)
Jennifer Hudson	"I Believe in You and Me"	Saved (Note: Randy Jackson's Wild Card choice)

== Top 12 contestants ==
Back standing – Leah LaBelle, Jennifer Hudson, Fantasia Barrino, John Stevens, Matthew Rogers, Amy Adams, Jon Peter Lewis Seated – Camile Velasco, Jasmine Trias, LaToya London, Diana DeGarmo, George Huff

- Fantasia Barrino (born June 30, 1984, in High Point, North Carolina; 19 years old at the time of the show) auditioned in Atlanta with Lauryn Hill's "Killing Me Softly with His Song" and Tina Turner's "Proud Mary." She performed Aretha Franklin's "Think" in Hollywood.
- Diana DeGarmo (born June 16, 1987, in Birmingham, Alabama; 16 years old at the time of the show) was from Snellville, Georgia, and auditioned in Honolulu with Aretha Franklin's "Chain of Fools." She performed Ike & Tina Turner's "A Fool in Love" in Hollywood.
- Jasmine Trias (born November 3, 1986, in Honolulu, Hawaii; 17 years old at the time of the show) was from Mililani, Hawaii, and auditioned in Honolulu.
- LaToya London (born December 29, 1978, in San Francisco; 25 years old at the time of the show) was from Oakland, California, and auditioned in San Francisco with Aretha Franklin's "Chain of Fools."
- George Huff (born November 4, 1980, in New Orleans; 23 years old at the time of the show) auditioned in Houston with Joe Cocker's "You Are So Beautiful." He performed Luther Vandross' "Here and Now" in Hollywood.
- John Stevens (born July 28, 1987, in Buffalo, New York; 16 years old at the time of the show) was from East Amherst, New York, and auditioned in New York City with Fred Astaire's "The Way You Look Tonight." He performed Tony Bennett's "I Left My Heart in San Francisco" in Hollywood.
- Jennifer Hudson (born September 12, 1981, in Chicago; 22 years old at the time of the show) auditioned in Atlanta with Aretha Franklin's "Share Your Love with Me."
- Jon Peter Lewis (born November 7, 1979, in Lincoln, Nebraska; 24 years old at the time of the show) was from Rexburg, Idaho, and auditioned in Honolulu with Van Morrison's "Crazy Love." He performed The Jackson 5's "I Want You Back" in Hollywood.
- Camile Velasco (born September 1, 1985, in Makati, Philippines; 18 years old at the time of the show) was from Haiku, Hawaii, and auditioned in Honolulu with Fugees' "Ready or Not."
- Amy Adams (born July 25, 1979, in Kansas City, Kansas; 24 years old at the time of the show) was from Bakersfield, California, and auditioned in Atlanta with Fontella Bass' "Rescue Me." She performed Jennifer Rush's "The Power of Love" in Hollywood.
- Matthew Rogers (born September 16, 1978, in Rancho Cucamonga, California; 25 years old at the time of the show) auditioned in Los Angeles with James Ingram's "Just Once."
- Leah LaBelle (born September 8, 1986, in Toronto, Canada; 17 years old at the time of the show) was from Seattle, and auditioned in New York with Whitney Houston's "I Believe in You and Me." She performed Diana Ross' "Theme from Mahogany (Do You Know Where You're Going To)" in Hollywood.

== Live Shows ==
This season, guests were introduced as celebrity judges and often also served as mentors for the week they appeared.

Color key:

This contestant was saved by the public vote.
This contestant was in the bottom two or three, but was saved by the public vote.
This contestant was eliminated.
This contestant won American Idol.
This contestant was the runner-up.

=== Top 12 – Soul (March 17) ===
Contestants are listed in the order they performed.

Contestant	Song	Result
LaToya London	"Ain't Nobody"	Safe
Amy Adams	"You Make Me Feel Brand New"	Bottom three
Matthew Rogers	"Hard to Handle"	Safe
Camile Velasco	"Son of a Preacher Man"	Safe
Jon Peter Lewis	"Drift Away"	Safe
Fantasia Barrino	"Signed, Sealed, Delivered I'm Yours"	Safe
George Huff	"(Sittin' On) The Dock of the Bay"	Safe
Jennifer Hudson	"Baby I Love You"	Bottom two
John Stevens	"Lately"	Safe
Leah LaBelle	"You Keep Me Hangin' On"	Eliminated
Jasmine Trias	"Inseparable"	Safe
Diana DeGarmo	"Think"	Safe

Non-competition performances
Performers	Song
Top 12	Soul medley
Clay Aiken	"Solitaire"

=== Top 11 – Country (March 24) ===
Contestants are listed in the order they performed.

Contestant	Country song	Result
Diana DeGarmo	"A Broken Wing"	Bottom three
George Huff	"I Can Love You Like That"	Safe
Fantasia Barrino	"Always on My Mind"	Safe
John Stevens	"King of the Road"	Safe
Camile Velasco	"Desperado"	Bottom two
Jennifer Hudson	"No One Else on Earth"	Safe
Jon Peter Lewis	"She Believes in Me"	Safe
Jasmine Trias	"Breathe"	Safe
Matthew Rogers	"Amazed"	Eliminated
LaToya London	"Ain't Goin' Down ('Til the Sun Comes Up)"	Safe
Amy Adams	"Sin Wagon"	Safe

Non-competition performance
Performers	Song
Kimberley Locke	"8th World Wonder"

=== Top 10 – Motown (March 31) ===
Nick Ashford and Valerie Simpson served as mentors and guest judges. Contestants are listed in the order they performed.

Contestant	Motown song	Result
Camile Velasco	"For Once in My Life"	Safe
Jon Peter Lewis	"This Old Heart of Mine (Is Weak for You)"	Safe
LaToya London	"Ooo Baby Baby"	Bottom three
Amy Adams	"Dancing in the Street"	Eliminated
John Stevens	"My Girl"	Safe
Jennifer Hudson	"Heat Wave"	Bottom two
Jasmine Trias	"You're All I Need to Get By"	Safe
Diana DeGarmo	"Do You Love Me"	Safe
Fantasia Barrino	"I Heard It Through the Grapevine"	Safe
George Huff	"Ain't Too Proud to Beg"	Safe

Non-competition performance
Performers	Song
Top 10	"Ain't No Mountain High Enough"

=== Top 9 – Elton John (April 7) ===
Elton John served as a mentor and guest judge. Contestants performed songs from Elton John's discography and are listed in the order they performed.

Contestant	Elton John song	Result
Fantasia Barrino	"Something About the Way You Look Tonight"	Safe
Jon Peter Lewis	"Rocket Man"	Safe
Jasmine Trias	"Don't Let the Sun Go Down on Me"	Bottom two
John Stevens	"Crocodile Rock"	Safe
Camile Velasco	"Goodbye Yellow Brick Road"	Eliminated
George Huff	"Take Me to the Pilot"	Safe
Diana DeGarmo	"I'm Still Standing"	Bottom three
LaToya London	"Someone Saved My Life Tonight"	Safe
Jennifer Hudson	"Circle of Life"	Safe

Non-competition performances
Performers	Song
Top 9 (Men)	"Daniel"
Top 9 (Women)	"Bennie and the Jets"
Top 9	"Saturday Night's Alright for Fighting"
Tamyra Gray	"Raindrops Will Fall"

=== Top 8 – Movie soundtracks (April 15) ===
Quentin Tarantino served as a mentor and guest judge. Contestants chose songs featured in movies and are listed in the order they performed.

Contestant	Song	Film	Result
George Huff	"Against All Odds (Take a Look at Me Now)"	Against All Odds	Safe
Jennifer Hudson	"I Have Nothing"	The Bodyguard	Safe
Jon Peter Lewis	"Jailhouse Rock"	Jailhouse Rock	Eliminated
Diana DeGarmo	"My Heart Will Go On"	Titanic	Bottom three
Fantasia Barrino	"Summertime"	Porgy and Bess	Safe
Jasmine Trias	"When I Fall in Love"	Sleepless in Seattle	Safe
John Stevens	"As Time Goes By"	Casablanca	Bottom two
LaToya London	"Somewhere"	West Side Story	Safe

Non-competition performance
Performers	Song
Christina Christian	"Forever and Never"

=== Top 7 – Barry Manilow (April 21) ===
Barry Manilow served as a mentor and guest judge. Contestants performed songs from his discography and are listed in the order they performed.

Contestant	Barry Manilow song	Result
Diana DeGarmo	"One Voice"	Safe
George Huff	"Tryin' to Get the Feeling Again"	Safe
Jennifer Hudson	"Weekend in New England"	Eliminated
Jasmine Trias	"I'll Never Love This Way Again"	Safe
LaToya London	"All the Time"	Bottom three
John Stevens	"Mandy"	Safe
Fantasia Barrino	"It's a Miracle"	Bottom two

Non-competition performance
Performers	Song
Top 7 with Barry Manilow	"Let Freedom Ring"

=== Top 6 – Gloria Estefan (April 28) ===
Gloria Estefan served as a mentor and guest judge. Contestants performed songs from her discography and are listed in the order they performed.

Contestant	Gloria Estefan song	Result
Fantasia Barrino	"Get on Your Feet"	Safe
George Huff	"Live for Loving You"	Bottom two
LaToya London	"Rhythm Is Gonna Get You"	Safe
John Stevens	"Music of My Heart"	Eliminated
Jasmine Trias	"Here We Are"	Bottom three
Diana DeGarmo	"Turn the Beat Around"	Safe

Non-competition performance
Performers	Song
Top 6	Gloria Estefan medley

=== Top 5 – Big Band (May 5) ===
Contestants performed two songs each and are listed in the order they performed.

Contestant	Big band song	Result
Diana DeGarmo	"Someone to Watch Over Me"	Safe
Diana DeGarmo	"Get Happy"	Safe
George Huff	"Cheek to Cheek"	Eliminated
George Huff	"What a Wonderful World"	Eliminated
LaToya London	"Too Close for Comfort"	Safe
LaToya London	"Don't Rain on My Parade"	Safe
Jasmine Trias	"The Way You Look Tonight"	Bottom two
Jasmine Trias	"Almost Like Being in Love"	Bottom two
Fantasia Barrino	"Crazy Little Thing Called Love"	Safe
Fantasia Barrino	"What Are You Doing the Rest of Your Life?"	Safe

=== Top 4 – Disco (May 12) ===
Donna Summer served as a mentor and guest judge. Contestants performed two songs each and are listed in the order they performed.

Contestant	Order	Disco song	Result
Jasmine Trias	1	"Everlasting Love"	Safe
Jasmine Trias	5	"It's Raining Men"	Safe
LaToya London	2	"Love You Inside Out"	Eliminated
LaToya London	6	"Don't Leave Me This Way"	Eliminated
Fantasia Barrino	3	"Knock on Wood"	Bottom two
Fantasia Barrino	7	"Holding Out for a Hero"	Bottom two
Diana DeGarmo	4	"This Is It"	Safe
Diana DeGarmo	8	"No More Tears (Enough Is Enough)"	Safe

Non-competition performances
Performers	Song
Top 4 with Donna Summer	"Bad Girls" "Hot Stuff" "Heaven Knows" "She Works Hard for the Money" "Last Dance"
Top 4 with Clay Aiken	"Fantasy"
Donna Summer	"MacArthur Park"

=== Top 3 (May 19) ===
Clive Davis served as a mentor and guest judge. Contestants performed three songs each: one chosen by themselves, one chosen by one of the judges, and one chosen by Clive Davis. Contestants are listed in the order they performed.

Contestant	Order	Songs	Result
Jasmine Trias	1	"Saving All My Love for You"	Eliminated
Jasmine Trias	4	"Mr. Melody" (Note: Song chosen by Paula Abdul)	Eliminated
Jasmine Trias	7	"All by Myself" (Note: Song chosen by Clive Davis)	Eliminated
Fantasia Barrino	2	"Chain of Fools"	Safe
Fantasia Barrino	5	"A Fool in Love" (Note: Song chosen by Simon Cowell)	Safe
Fantasia Barrino	8	"The Greatest Love of All"	Safe
Diana DeGarmo	3	"Ain't No Mountain High Enough"	Safe
Diana DeGarmo	6	"Because You Loved Me" (Note: Song chosen by Randy Jackson)	Safe
Diana DeGarmo	9	"Don't Cry Out Loud"	Safe

Non-competition performances
Performers	Song
Tamyra Gray	"Star" "Raindrops Will Fall"
Guy Sebastian	"Angels Brought Me Here"

=== Top 2 – Finale (May 26) ===
The two finalists performed three songs each, and are listed in the order they performed.

Contestant	Order	Songs	Result
Diana DeGarmo	1	"I Believe"	Runner-up
Diana DeGarmo	3	"No More Tears (Enough Is Enough)"	Runner-up
Diana DeGarmo	5	"Don't Cry Out Loud"	Runner-up
Fantasia Barrino	2	"All My Life"	Winner
Fantasia Barrino	4	"Summertime"	Winner
Fantasia Barrino	6	"I Believe"	Winner

Non-competition performances
Performers	Song
Paul Anka	"My Way" (Note: The song was rewritten by Anka himself specially for this episode.)
Tamyra Gray	"The Star-Spangled Banner"
Kelly Clarkson and Ruben Studdard with Fantasia Barrino and Diana DeGarmo	"The Impossible Dream (The Quest)"
Kelly Clarkson	"Beautiful Disaster"
Top 12	"Reach Out I'll Be There" "1-2-3" "Heaven Knows" "She Works Hard for the Money" "Solid" "It Don't Mean a Thing (If It Ain't Got That Swing)" "I'm Still Standing" "I Made It Through the Rain"
Ruben Studdard	"What If"
Diana DeGarmo	"I Believe"
Fantasia Barrino	"Dreams"
Fantasia Barrino and Diana DeGarmo	"I Knew You Were Waiting (For Me)"
Fantasia Barrino	"I Believe"

After a nationwide vote of more than 65 million votes — more than the first two seasons combined — Fantasia Barrino won American Idol over Diana DeGarmo.

Kelly Clarkson is quoted in the June 14, 2004 People magazine as saying she voted for Fantasia: "I just hit redial, redial."

Prior to the results show, the governors of Georgia and North Carolina—the home states of DeGarmo and Barrino, respectively— announced a friendly bet between them over which state's resident would prevail, with each wagering a VIP NASCAR ticket package and a shipment of his state's signature fruit. The bet participants were Georgia Governor Sonny Perdue and North Carolina Governor Mike Easley.

== Elimination chart ==
Color key:

Winner
Runner-up
Saved by the public
Saved by the judges
Wild Card
Bottom two or three
Did not perform
Eliminated

American Idol (season 3) - Eliminations
Contestant	Pl.	Semifinals				Wild Card	Top 12	Top 11	Top 10	Top 9	Top 8	Top 7	Top 6	Top 5	Top 4	Top 3	Finale
Contestant	Pl.	2/11	2/18	2/25	3/3	3/10	3/17	3/24	3/31	4/7	4/15 (Note: During the week of April 14, the episodes were pushed back one day for a White House press conference on Tuesday, April 13. The performance show aired on Wednesday, April 14, and the results show on Thursday, April 15.)	4/21	4/28	5/5	5/12	5/19	5/26
Fantasia Barrino	1	Safe (1st)	N/A	N/A	N/A	N/A	Safe	Safe	Safe	Safe	Safe	Bottom two	Safe	Safe	Bottom two	Safe	Winner
Diana DeGarmo	2	Safe (2nd)	N/A	N/A	N/A	N/A	Safe	Bottom three	Safe	Bottom three	Bottom three	Safe	Safe	Safe	Safe	Safe	Runner-up
Jasmine Trias	3	N/A	N/A	N/A	Safe (2nd)	N/A	Safe	Safe	Safe	Bottom two	Safe	Safe	Bottom three	Bottom two	Safe	Eliminated	
LaToya London	4	N/A	N/A	Safe (1st)	N/A	N/A	Safe	Safe	Bottom three	Safe	Safe	Bottom three	Safe	Safe	Eliminated		
George Huff	5	N/A	N/A	N/A	Wild Card (3rd)	Saved	Safe	Safe	Safe	Safe	Safe	Safe	Bottom two	Eliminated			
John Stevens	6	N/A	N/A	N/A	Safe (1st)	N/A	Safe	Safe	Safe	Safe	Bottom two	Safe	Eliminated				
Jennifer Hudson	7	Wild Card	N/A	N/A	N/A	Saved	Bottom two	Safe	Bottom two	Safe	Safe	Eliminated					
Jon Peter Lewis	8	N/A	N/A	Wild Card (3rd)	N/A	Saved	Safe	Safe	Safe	Safe	Eliminated						
Camile Velasco	9	N/A	Safe (1st)	N/A	N/A	N/A	Safe	Bottom two	Safe	Eliminated							
Amy Adams	10	N/A	N/A	Safe (2nd)	N/A	N/A	Bottom three	Safe	Eliminated								
Matthew Rogers	11	N/A	Safe (2nd)	N/A	N/A	N/A	Safe	Eliminated									
Leah LaBelle	12	N/A	N/A	Wild Card	N/A	Saved	Eliminated										
Elizabeth LeTendre		N/A	N/A	Wild Card	N/A	Eliminated											
Matthew Metzger		Wild Card (3rd)	N/A	N/A	N/A	Eliminated											
Suzy Vulaca		N/A	N/A	N/A	Wild Card	Eliminated											
Katie Webber		Wild Card	N/A	N/A	N/A	Eliminated											
Heather Piccinni		N/A	N/A	N/A	Eliminated												
John Preator		N/A	N/A	N/A	Eliminated												
Tiara Purifoy		N/A	N/A	N/A	Eliminated												
Lisa Wilson		N/A	N/A	N/A	Eliminated												
Charly Lowry		N/A	N/A	Eliminated													
Jonah Moananu		N/A	N/A	Eliminated													
Eric Yoder		N/A	N/A	Eliminated													
Lisa Leuschner		N/A	Eliminated (3rd)														
Marisa Joy		N/A	Eliminated														
Kara Master		N/A	Eliminated														
Briana Ramirez-Rial		N/A	Eliminated														
Jesus Roman		N/A	Eliminated														
Noel Roman		N/A	Eliminated														
Marque Lynche		Eliminated															
Ashley Thomas		Eliminated															
Erskine Walcott		Eliminated															

== Controversies ==
Both Jennifer Hudson and LaToya London, part of the final 12, were eliminated, despite high praises from the judges. After Hudson was eliminated, Elton John, who was a mentor for that season, criticized the vote as being "incredibly racist" in a press conference.

The elimination of both Hudson and London has been pointed out as a classic demonstration of vote-splitting in American Idol, in which the presence of similar choices reduces the votes for each of the similar choices. Hudson, London, and Barrino (who eventually won the competition) were all female, African-American, highly complimented singers—all appealing to the same demographic bloc of voters. All three of these previously popular singers ended up in the "bottom three" the night Hudson was eliminated, having the lowest individual vote counts.

== Reception ==
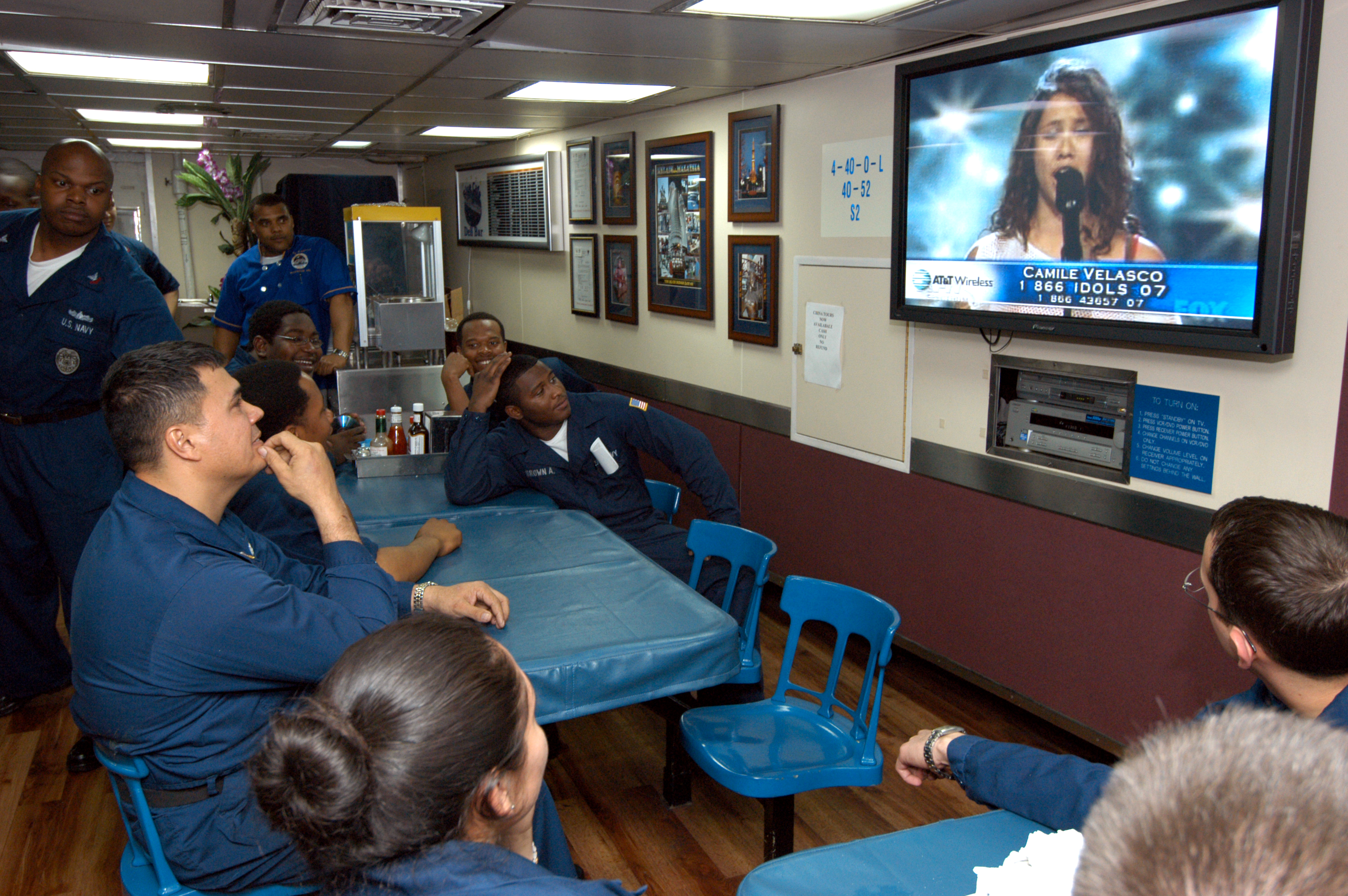
Aboard the USS Blue Ridge, Machinist's Mate 1st Class William Velasco watches his daughter Camile Velasco perform.

=== U.S. Nielsen ratings ===
Live + same day ratings

This season the show was ranked second overall in total viewer for the 2003–2004 TV seasons, with its Tuesday episodes taking the top spot, averaging 25.73 million viewers, while the Wednesday episodes ranked third with 24.31 million. It became the top-rated show for the 18-49 demographic for the season, a position it has held for all subsequent years up to and including 2011.

Episode list

Show	Episode	Air date	Week rank	18-49 rating	Viewers (in millions)
1	"Audition: New York"	January 19, 2004	2	12.9	29.0
2	"Audition: Atlanta"	January 20, 2004	3	12.5	28.6
3	"Audition: Houston"	January 21, 2004	1	12.7	29.4
4	"Audition: Los Angeles and San Francisco"	January 27, 2004	3	13.0	29.6
5	"Audition: Hawaii"	January 28, 2004	4	12.0	28.3
6	"Road to Hollywood, Best and Worst of the Rest"	February 2, 2004	8	9.7	21.1
7	"Hollywood Week: Part 1"	February 3, 2004	1	13.1	30.1
8	"Hollywood Week: Part 2"	February 4, 2004	3	12.6	28.8
9	"Top 32: Group 1"	February 10, 2004	2	11.1	26.2
10	"Top 32: Group 1 Results"	February 11, 2004	4	10.5	24.5
11	"Top 32: Group 2"	February 17, 2004	2	10.9	25.2
12	"Top 32: Group 2 Results"	February 18, 2004	6	9.8	22.1
13	"Top 32: Group 3"	February 24, 2004	4	11.3	26.6
14	"Top 32: Group 3 Results"	February 25, 2004	5	10.3	23.0
15	"Special: Uncut, Uncensored and Untalented"	March 1, 2004	6	8.5	19.7
16	"Top 32: Group 4"	March 2, 2004	1	11.1	25.5
17	"Top 32: Group 4 Results"	March 3, 2004	7	8.5	19.3
18	"Wildcard"	March 9, 2004	2	10.7	24.6
19	"Wildcard Results"	March 10, 2004	4	9.7	22.0
20	"Top 12 Perform"	March 16, 2004	1	11.3	26.7
21	"Top 12 Results"	March 17, 2004	2	9.7	22.9
22	"Top 11 Perform"	March 23, 2004	1	11.5	27.0
23	"Top 11 Results"	March 24, 2004	3	8.8	20.4
24	"Top 10 Perform"	March 30, 2004	2	8.8	25.9
25	"Top 10 Results"	March 31, 2004	3	9.4	21.9
26	"Top 9 Perform"	April 6, 2004	1	10.1	23.5
27	"Top 9 Results"	April 7, 2004	4	8.9	20.6
28	"Top 8 Perform"^{(1)}	April 14, 2004	3	9.7	23.1
29	"Top 8 Results"^{(1)}	April 15, 2004	8	6.2	15.3
30	"Top 7 Perform"	April 20, 2004	1	10.1	23.4
31	"Top 7 Results"	April 21, 2004	3	9.3	21.2
32	"Top 6 Perform"	April 27, 2004	1	10.4	23.4
33	"Top 6 Results"	April 28, 2004	3	9.3	21.2
34	"Special: The Final Five"	May 3, 2004	22	4.8	11.7
35	"Top 5 Perform"	May 4, 2004	6	9.0	22.8
36	"Top 5 Results"	May 5, 2004	7	8.8	21.2
37	"Top 4 Perform"	May 11, 2004	3	9.6	23.2
38	"Top 4 Results"	May 12, 2004	5	10.0	22.3
39	"Special: The Final Three"	May 17, 2004		4.2	
40	"Top 3 Perform"	May 18, 2004	2	10.0	23.6
41	"Top 3 Results"	May 19, 2004	4	9.8	22.4
42	"Special: The American Idol Phenomenon"	May 23, 2004	27	3.7	10.8
43	"Top 2 Perform (Finale)"	May 25, 2004	2	10.6	25.1
44	"American Idol Season 3 Finale"	May 26, 2004	1	12.0	28.8

Note 1: The Top 8 shows were shifted to Wednesday and Thursday due to a presidential address on Tuesday.

Live + 7 day (DVR) ratings

== Related programming ==
- Home for the Holidays: Kelly, Ruben, & Fantasia

Home for the Holidays: Kelly, Ruben & Fantasia aired in November 2004.

- American Idol Rewind (season 3)

Re-edited episodes of the third season were shown in syndication as American Idol Rewind, paired with season 4. The season could not be syndicated in full for reasons beyond control (citing its unfair voting allegations) and is the only season to be edited for those reasons.

== Music releases ==
- American Idol Season 3: Greatest Soul Classics

== Concert tour ==
- American Idols Live! Tour 2004
