= List of awards and nominations received by Fantasia Barrino =

Fantasia Barrino awards and nominations
Awards and nominations
Award	Wins	Nominations
American Music Awards	0	3
BET	0	5
Billboard	3	3
Golden Globe	0	1
Grammy	1	12
NAACP	7	14
Satellite Awards	0	1
Black Reel Awards	2	4
Critic's Choice Movie Awards	0	1
Celebration of Cinema and Television	1	1
Theatre World Award	1	1
Screen Actors Guild Awards	0	1
People's Choice Awards	0	1
Astra Film Awards	1	2
BAFTAs	0	1

Totals (Note: Certain award groups do not simply award one winner. They acknowledge several different recipients, have runners-up, and have third place. Since this is a specific recognition and is different from losing an award, runner-up mentions are considered wins in this award tally. For simplification and to avoid errors, each award in this list has been presumed to have had a prior nomination.)
- Wins: 29
- Nominations: 79

This is a list of awards and nominations received by Fantasia, an American singer-songwriter and actress. Grammy Award winner, Fantasia has earned numerous awards throughout her career, being mentioned in major international award ceremonies.

After winning the third season of American Idol, in 2004 she published her debut single "I Believe" which won two Billboard Music Awards. Her debut studio album Free Yourself, published in 2005, won the NAACP Image Award for Outstanding Female Artist and received three nominations at the 48th Annual Grammy Awards, including Grammy Award for Best R&B Album.

The following self-titled album garnered three 50th Annual Grammy Award nominations, including for Best Contemporary R&B Album, Best Female R&B Vocal Performance for “When I See U” and Best R&B Song for "When I See U". Her third studio album, Back to Me, won the Grammy Award for Best Female R&B Vocal Performance and the NAACP Image Award for Outstanding Song for the single "Bittersweet".

In 2007, Fantasia landed the role of Celie Harris-Johnson on the stage of Broadway musical The Color Purple, being recognized with the Theatre World Award for Outstanding Broadway Debut Performance and an NAACP Theatre Awards for her performance in the U.S. tour production between 2009 and 2010. Fantasia reprised the role in her film debut in the 2023 film adaptation of The Color Purple, which earned her a Black Reel Award; she also received nominations for the Golden Globe Award for Best Actress – Motion Picture Comedy or Musical, the BAFTA Award for Best Actress in a Leading Role and the Satellite Award for Best Actress – Motion Picture; along with receiving nominations for a Screen Actors Guild Award and a Critics' Choice Movie Award as part of the ensemble cast.

== Awards and nominations ==
Name of the award ceremony, year presented, award category, nominee(s) of the award, and the result of the nomination
Award	Year (Note: Indicates the year of ceremony. Each year is linked to the article about the awards held that year, wherever possible.)	Category	Recipient(s)/Work(s)	Result	Ref.
AAFCA Awards	2024	Best Ensemble	The Color Purple	Won	
American Music Awards	2005	Favorite Female Soul/R&B Artist	Herself	Nominated	
American Music Awards	2005	Favorite Soul/R&B Album	Free Yourself	Nominated	
American Music Awards	2007	Favorite Female Soul/R&B Artist	Herself	Nominated	
ASCAP Rhythm and Soul Awards	2006	Outstanding Most Performed Song	"Free Yourself"	Won	
ASCAP Rhythm and Soul Awards	2006	Outstanding Most Performed Song	"Truth Is"	Won	
Astra Film Awards	2024	Best Actress	The Color Purple	Nominated	
Astra Film Awards	2024	Best Cast Ensemble	The Color Purple	Won	
BAFTA Awards	2024	Best Actress in a Leading Role	The Color Purple	Nominated	
BET Awards	2005	Best Female R&B Artist	Herself	Nominated	
BET Awards	2005	Best New Artist	Herself	Nominated	
BET Awards	2013	Centric Award	"Lose to Win"	Nominated	
BET Awards	2017	Centric Award	"Sleeping with the One I Love"	Nominated	
BET Awards	2017	Best Gospel/Inspirational Award	"I Made It" feat. Tye Tribbett	Nominated	
BET Awards	2024	Best Actress	The Color Purple	Nominated	
Billboard Music Awards	2004	Top Selling Single of the Year	"I Believe"	Won	
Billboard Music Awards	2004	Top Selling R&B/Hip-Hop Single of the Year ("I Believe")	"I Believe"	Won	
Billboard R&B/Hip-Hop Awards	2005	Top R&B/Hip-Hop Single	"I Believe"	Won	
Black Reel Awards	2014	Outstanding Original or Adapted Song	"In the Middle of the Night" (from The Butler)	Nominated	
Black Reel Awards	2024	Outstanding Lead Performance	The Color Purple	Nominated	
Black Reel Awards	2024	Outstanding Breakthrough Performance	The Color Purple	Won	
Black Reel Awards	2024	Outstanding Original Soundtrack	The Color Purple	Won	
Celebration of Cinema and Television	2023	Ensemble Award – Film	The Color Purple	Won	
Critics' Choice Movie Awards	2024	Best Acting Ensemble	The Color Purple	Nominated	
Elle Women in Hollywood Awards	2023	Women in Hollywood Award	The Color Purple	Honoree	
Georgia Film Critics Association Awards	2024	Best Ensemble	The Color Purple	Nominated	
Golden Globe Awards	2024	Best Actress – Motion Picture Comedy or Musical	The Color Purple	Nominated	
Grammy Awards	2006	Best Female R&B Vocal Performance	"Free Yourself"	Nominated	
Grammy Awards	2006	Best Traditional R&B Vocal Performance	"Summertime"	Nominated	
Grammy Awards	2006	Best R&B Album	Free Yourself	Nominated	
Grammy Awards	2008	Best Female R&B Vocal Performance	"When I See U"	Nominated	
Grammy Awards	2008	Best Contemporary R&B Album	Fantasia	Nominated	
Grammy Awards	2009	Best R&B Performance by a Duo or Group with Vocal	"I'm His Only Woman"	Nominated	
Grammy Awards	2011	Best R&B Album	Back to Me	Nominated	
Grammy Awards	2011	Best Female R&B Vocal Performance	"Bittersweet"	Won	
Grammy Awards	2014	Best Urban Contemporary Album	Side Effects of You	Nominated	
Grammy Awards	2014	Best R&B Song	"Without Me" (feat. Kelly Rowland and Missy Elliott)"	Nominated	
Grammy Awards	2014	Best Traditional R&B Performance	"Get It Right"	Nominated	
Grammy Awards	2017	Best Traditional R&B Performance	"Sleeping with the One I Love"	Nominated	
Grammy Producers Brunch	2013	BOE Global Artist Award	Herself	Honoree	
Houston Film Critics Society	2024	Best Actress	The Color Purple	Nominated	
NAACP Image Awards	2005	Herself	Outstanding Female Artist	Won	
NAACP Image Awards	2007	Herself	Outstanding Female Artist	Nominated	
NAACP Image Awards	2007	Outstanding Actress in a Television Movie, Mini-Series, or Dramatical Special	Life Is Not a Fairy Tale	Nominated	
NAACP Image Awards	2008	Outstanding Duo or Group Collaboration	"Put You Up On Game"	Nominated	
NAACP Image Awards	2009	Outstanding Duo or Group	"I'm His Only Woman" (with Jennifer Hudson)	Won	
NAACP Image Awards	2011	Outstanding Song	"Bittersweet"	Won	
NAACP Image Awards	2017	Outstanding Female Artist	Herself	Nominated	
NAACP Image Awards	2020	Outstanding Female Artist	Herself	Nominated	
NAACP Image Awards	2020	Outstanding Song, Traditional	"Enough"	Nominated	
NAACP Image Awards	2020	Outstanding Album	Sketchbook	Nominated	
NAACP Image Awards	2024	Outstanding Ensemble Cast in a Motion Picture	The Color Purple	Won	
NAACP Image Awards	2024	Outstanding Actress in a Motion Picture	The Color Purple	Won	
NAACP Image Awards	2024	Entertainer of the Year	Herself	Nominated	
NAACP Image Awards	2025	Outstanding Duo, Group or Collaboration (Traditional)	"Summertime" (with Adam Blackstone)	Won	
NAACP Image Awards	2026	Outstanding Duo, Group or Collaboration (Traditional)	"Boots on the Ground (Remix)" (with 803Fresh)	Won	
NAACP Theatre Award	2011	Distinguished Honoree	Herself	Won	
North Carolina Film Critics Association	2024	Ken Hanke Memorial Tar Heel Award	The Color Purple	Won	
People's Choice Awards	2024	The Drama Movie Star of The Year	The Color Purple	Nominated	
Satellite Awards	2024	Best Actress in Motion Picture, Comedy or Musical	The Color Purple	Nominated	
Screen Actors Guild	2023	Outstanding Performance by a Cast in a Motion Picture	The Color Purple	Nominated	
Soul Train Music Awards	2005	Best R&B/Soul or Rap New Artist	"Truth is"	Nominated	
Soul Train Music Awards	2005	R&B/Soul Single, Solo	"Truth is"	Nominated	
Soul Train Music Awards	2005	R&B/Soul or Rap Song of the Year	"Truth is"	Nominated	
Soul Train Music Awards	2005	R&B/Soul Album, Solo	Free Yourself	Nominated	
Soul Train Music Awards	2006	Best R&B/Soul Album	Free Yourself	Nominated	
Soul Train Music Awards	2010	Best R&B/Soul Female Artist	Herself	Nominated	
Soul Train Music Awards	2010	Record of the Year (Songwriter's Award)	"Bittersweet"	Nominated	
Soul Train Music Awards	2013	Best R&B/Soul Female Artist	Herself	Nominated	
Soul Train Music Awards	2013	Album of the Year	Side Effects of You	Nominated	
Soul Train Music Awards	2013	Songwriter's Award	"Lose To Win"	Nominated	
Soul Train Music Awards	2016	Best Female R&B/Soul Singer	Herself	Nominated	
Soul Train Music Awards	2020	Soul Train Certified Award	Herself	Nominated	
Teen Choice Awards	2004	Choice Reality/Variety TV Star: Female	Herself	Nominated	
Theatre World Award	2007	Outstanding Broadway Debut Performance	The Color Purple	Honoree	
Variety's Power of Women Awards	2023	Power of Women Award	The Color Purple	Honoree	

== Other awards ==
Year	Nominee / Work	Award	Result	Ref.
2005	Herself	Emmis Communications/Hot-97 "KISS-FM": Phenomenal Woman Award	Won	
2007	Herself	Broadway.com Audience Choice Award: Favorite (Female) Replacement – The Color Purple	Won	
2008	Herself	Greensboro sit-ins Organization: Founder's Appreciation Award – Herself	Won	
2010	Herself	Barbados Music Awards: International Award of Excellence: Herself	Won	
2023	Herself	The Root 100	honoree	
