= Side Effects of You Tour =

2013 concert tour by Fantasia Barrino

- Tour by Fantasia Barrino
- Promotional poster for 2013 tour
- Associated album: Side Effects of You
- Start date: July 4, 2013
- End date: September 28, 2013
- Legs: 1
- No. of shows: 28 in North America

Fantasia Barrino concert chronology
- Back to Me Tour (2010–11); Side Effects of You Tour (2013); Fantasia & Anthony Hamilton: Live in Concert (2016)

The Side Effects of You Tour is the second headlining tour by American recording artist, Fantasia Barrino. Primarily visiting the United States and Barbados, the tour supported her fourth studio album, Side Effects of You. Before the tour commenced, Barrino served as the opening act for Andrea Bocelli's 2013 tour.

== Opening acts ==
- Raheem DeVaughn (New Orleans—July 4)
- Avant (Miami)
- Joe (Oak Grove)
- Musiq Soulchild (St. Louis)
- Toni Norville (Bridgetown)
- 112 (Charlotte)

== Setlist ==
1. "I'm Doin' Me"
2. "Man of the House"
3. "Without Me" (contains excerpts from "Started from the Bottom")
4. "Free Yourself"
5. "Trust Him"
6. "A Change Is Gonna Come"
7. "Collard Greens & Cornbread"
8. "Truth Is"
9. "Ain’t Gon' Beg You"
10. "Nasty Girl" / "In My House" / "The Bird"
11. "If I Was a Bird"
12. "When I See U"
13. "Bittersweet"
14. "Even Angels"
15. "In Deep"
16. "Get It Right"
17. "Ain't All Bad"
18. "It's All Good"
19. "Side Effects of You"
20. "Lose to Win"
21. "Lighthouse"

== Tour dates ==
Date	City	Country	Venue
North America
July 4, 2013	New Orleans	United States	House of Blues
July 6, 2013^{[A]}	Baltimore	United States	M&T Bank Stadium
July 7, 2013	New Orleans	United States	New Orleans Theater
July 12, 2013	Oak Grove	United States	Viceroy Performing Arts Center
July 13, 2013^{[B]}	Chicago	United States	Foss Park Pavilion
July 18, 2013	Philadelphia	United States	Dell Music Center
July 19, 2013	Hartford	United States	Bushnell Center for the Performing Arts
July 20, 2013	Washington, D.C.	United States	Warner Theatre
July 21, 2013^{[C]}	San Dimas	United States	Bonelli Park Special Events Area
July 26, 2013	Columbia	United States	Township Auditorium
July 27, 2013^{[D]}	Cincinnati	United States	Paul Brown Stadium
August 2, 2013	Miami	United States	James L. Knight Center
August 16, 2013	Dallas	United States	Medusa
August 17, 2013	Indianapolis	United States	Murat Theatre
August 18, 2013	Houston	United States	Arena Theatre
August 24, 2013	Montgomery	United States	Montgomery Performing Arts Centre
August 25, 2013	Birmingham	United States	BJCC Concert Hall
August 29, 2013	Jacksonville	United States	Florida Theatre
August 30, 2013^{[E]}	Kissimmee	United States	Osceola Ballroom
August 31, 2013^{[F]}	Pensacola Beach	United States	Casino Beach
September 1, 2013^{[G]}	Baton Rouge	United States	Baton Rouge River Center
September 2, 2013^{[H]}	Quincy	United States	Tanyard Creek Amphitheater
September 5, 2013	Bennettsville	United States	Fortunes Bar & Lounge
September 13, 2013	St. Louis	United States	Fox Theatre
September 15, 2013	Bridgetown	Barbados	Garfield Sobers Gymnasium
September 20, 2013	Los Angeles	United States	Club Nokia
September 21, 2013	San Francisco	United States	Regency Ballroom
September 28, 2013	Charlotte	United States	Bojangles' Coliseum

Festivals and other miscellaneous performances
^{A} This concert was a part of the "African American Festival"
^{B} This concert was a part of the "Foss Park District Festival—Concert in the Park"
^{C} This concert was a part of "JazzFest West"
^{D} This concert was a part of the "Macy's Music Festival"
^{E} This concert was a part of the "Tom Joyner Family Reunion"
^{F} This concert was a part of the "Gulf Coast Summer Fest"
^{G} This concert was a part of the "Labor Day Weekend R&B Explosion"
^{H} This concert was a part of the "Labor Day Picnic Jam"

Cancellations and rescheduled shows

September 21, 2013	San Francisco, California	Warfield Theatre	Moved to the Regency Ballroom

=== Box office score data ===
Venue	City	Tickets sold / Available	Gross revenue
James L. Knight Center	Miami	2,715 / 4,629 (59%)	$150,923
Club Nokia	Los Angeles	1,299 / 1,500 (87%)	$50,043
Regency Ballroom	San Francisco	700 / 700 (100%)	$35,370
