= Back to Me Tour =

2010–11 concert tour by Fantasia Barrino

- Tour by Fantasia Barrino
- Promotional poster for 2010 tour
- Associated album: Back to Me
- Start date: November 5, 2010
- End date: January 1, 2011
- Legs: 1
- No. of shows: 26 in North America

Fantasia Barrino concert chronology
- Back to Me Tour (2010–11); Side Effects of You Tour (2013)

The Back to Me Tour was the first headlining concert tour by American recording artist Fantasia Barrino. Primarily visiting the United States, the tour supported her third studio album, Back to Me.

Previously, Barrino toured with Kanye West on his Touch the Sky Tour in 2005. Barrino also toured alongside Jamie Foxx on his "Unpredictable Tour" in 2006 and the "American Idols LIVE! Tour 2004" in 2004.

== Background ==
After the success of Barrino's third album, she embarked on a promotional tour of England to promote the record. The tour was announced September 28, 2010, on Barrino's official website. The tour followed the turbulent events of the summer, when she attempted suicide (documented on her television series Fantasia for Real), and an abortion. Despite the events, Barrino remarked her excitement for touring, as a way to focus on her music and connect with her fans.

To introduce the tour, Barrino stated, "I'm so excited about this tour and having the chance to connect with my fans, the people that love me and have been supporting me through everything. This tour is going to be a real special, intimate experience for them and for me."

Barrino mentioned that videos posted on YouTube inspired the concept behind the tour. She said that after her personal ordeals, she watched the music performances of Cab Calloway, Ann Peebles, Tina Turner, James Brown, Stevie Wonder and Freddie Mercury.

Speaking on the tour, Barrino stated:

"[This is] not a concert, this is a show. There's a storyline, there's a message in the show that I have. There are moments where I go thorough [sic] changes. In music there's purity, there's honesty, there are feelings from all these artists who go through some of the same things. They're singing about experience, heartache and pain, singing whatever it is that they’re going through."

== Opening acts ==
- Eric Benét
- Kandi Burruss (select dates)
- El DeBarge (select dates)

== Setlist ==
1. "Instrumental Sequence" (contains elements of "Minnie the Moocher")
2. "Truth Is" / "Ain't Gon' Beg You" / "Selfish (I Want U 2 Myself)"
3. "Free Yourself"
4. "Man of the House"
5. "I'm Doin' Me"
6. "Trust Him"
7. "Collard Greens & Cornbread"
8. "I Can't Stand the Rain" / "I Don't Know Why" / "Kiss"
9. "The Thrill Is Gone"
10. "Come Together"
11. "Move on Me"
12. "Teach Me"
13. "Who's Been Lovin' You"
14. "When I See U"
15. "Bittersweet"
16. "Even Angels" / "Theme from Mahogany (Do You Know Where You're Going To)"
17. "I'm Here"
18. "Falling in Love Tonight"
19. "Back to Life"

== Tour dates ==
Date	City	Country	Venue
North America
November 5, 2010	Norfolk	United States	Chrysler Hall
November 6, 2010	Upper Darby Township	United States	Tower Theater
November 7, 2010	Baltimore	United States	Meyerhoff Symphony Hall
November 10, 2010	Savannah	United States	Mercer Theatre
November 11, 2010	Atlanta	United States	Fox Theatre
November 12, 2010	Tampa	United States	Morsani Hall
November 13, 2010	Jacksonville	United States	Moran Theater
November 14, 2010	Miami	United States	James L. Knight Center
November 17, 2010	Charlotte	United States	Ovens Auditorium
November 18, 2010	Greensboro	United States	War Memorial Auditorium
November 19, 2010	Columbia	United States	Township Auditorium
November 20, 2010	Birmingham	United States	BJCC Concert Hall
November 24, 2010	Los Angeles	United States	Club Nokia
November 26, 2010	San Diego	United States	Copley Symphony Hall
November 27, 2010	San Francisco	United States	Warfield Theatre
December 1, 2010	Southaven	United States	DeSoto Civic Center Theatre
December 2, 2010	Grand Prairie	United States	Verizon Theatre
December 3, 2010	Mobile	United States	Mobile Civic Center Theater
December 4, 2010	New Orleans	United States	Lakefront Arena
December 5, 2010	Houston	United States	Reliant Arena
December 27, 2010	New York City	United States	Beacon Theatre
December 28, 2010	Washington, D.C.	United States	DAR Constitution Hall
December 29, 2010	Cleveland	United States	State Theatre
December 30, 2010	Chicago	United States	Auditorium Theatre
December 31, 2010	Detroit	United States	Fox Theatre
January 1, 2011	St. Louis	United States	Fox Theatre

Cancellations and rescheduled shows

November 4, 2010	Richmond	Landmark Theater	Cancelled
November 27, 2010	Oakland	Paramount Theatre	Moved to the Warfield Theatre in San Francisco, California
December 3, 2010	Southaven	DeSoto Civic Center Theatre	Rescheduled to December 1, 2010
December 8, 2010	Indianapolis	Murat Theatre	Cancelled
December 9, 2010	Louisville	Palace Theatre	Cancelled
December 10, 2010	Detroit	Fox Theatre	Rescheduled to December 31, 2010
December 11, 2010	Cincinnati	Procter & Gamble Hall	Cancelled
December 12, 2010	Augusta	Bell Auditorium	Cancelled

=== Box office score data ===
Venue	City	Tickets sold / available	Gross revenue
Ovens Auditorium	Charlotte	1,434 / 2,447 (57%)	$91,490
Fox Theatre	Atlanta	2,536 / 4,666 (54%)	$167,202
Morsani Hall	Tampa	2,089 / 2,610 (80%)	$109,122
Club Nokia	Los Angeles	1,565 / 1,800 (87%)	$98,817
Verizon Theatre	Grand Prairie	3,812 / 3,867 (98%)	$184,186
TOTAL		11,436 / 15,390 (74%)	$732,267
