= Marching 100 (disambiguation) =

Marching 100 may refer to:

- Marching 100, the marching band at Florida A&M University
- Indiana University Marching Hundred, the marching band at Indiana University Bloomington

== Similar names ==
- The Marching 101, the marching band at South Carolina State University
