= Barreno =

Barreno is a surname. Notable people with the surname include:

- Maria Isabel Barreno (1939–2016), Portuguese writer
- Eva Barreno (born 1950), Spanish botanist and lichenologist
- Rafael Barreno (born 1977), Venezuelan sport wrestler

== See also ==
- Marcos García Barreno (born 1987), Spanish footballer
- Barrino
