= Cross the Track (We Better Go Back) =

"Cross The Track (We Better Go Back)"

Single by Maceo and the Macks
- Released: 1974–1975
- Recorded: 1974
- Genre: Funk, soul
- Length: 3:20 (single version), 6:16 (1987 version)
- Label: People Records
- Songwriter: James Brown
- Producer: James Brown

"Cross The Track (We Better Go Back)", often wrongly attributed as "Cross The Tracks (We Better Go Back)", is a 1975 single by Maceo and the Macks. It made #54 on the UK singles chart.

== Sampling ==
In 1987, the song was re-released and made #1 on the UK Dance Chart.

In 1988, it was sampled for Kid 'N Play's "Do This My Way" and Stetsasonic's "DBC Let the Music Play".

In 1989, it was sampled for "D.E.F. = Doug E. Fresh (Dance, Party Get-Up Remix)" by Doug E. Fresh and The Get Fresh Crew and "Do It to the Crowd" by Twin Hype.

In 1997, it was sampled by the Korean group Sechskies on the track “연정 (Heartbreak)” in their debut album, School Anthem (학원별곡).

In 2006 "Surround U" by Fantasia Barrino sampled this song.

In 2010, the track was sampled by A Skillz on their track "Twang Banger".

== In other media ==
The original track appeared in the 2000 film Snatch, as well as its soundtrack.

In 2004, it appeared in the Grand Theft Auto: San Andreas soundtrack

In 2006, it appeared in the Driver: Parallel Lines soundtrack.
