= Barrino =

Barrino may refer to the following people:

- Fantasia Barrino (born 1984), American R&B singer
- Ricco Barrino (born 1980), American R&B recording artist and songwriter, brother of Fantasia
- The Barrino Brothers, Nathaniel, Perry, and Julius Barrino, an American soul music group
