= Fantasia (Fantasia album) =

Studio album by Fantasia
- Released: December 12, 2006
- Genre: R&B
- Length: 50:08
- Labels: 19; S; J
- Producers: Babyface; Bryan Michael Cox; Danja; Dre & Vidal; Missy Elliott; Dirty Harry; Kwamé; Harold Lilly; Tone Mason; Midi Mafia; Mzmeriq; Swizz Beatz

Fantasia chronology
Free Yourself (2004)	Fantasia (2006)	Back to Me (2010)

Singles from Fantasia
- 1. "Hood Boy" Released: November 25, 2006; 2. "When I See U" Released: April 17, 2007; 3. "Only One U" Released: June 29, 2007

Fantasia is the second studio album by American recording artist Fantasia. It was released by 19 Recordings, S Records and J Records on December 12, 2006 in the United States. Fantasia reteamed with Harold Lilly, Swizz Beatz and Missy Elliott and her team – all of which had contributed to her debut album to work on the project. The label also consulted new collaborators to record with her, including Babyface, Dre & Vidal, Kwamé, and Midi Mafia. Elliott, rapper Big Boi and Fantasia's brother Ricco appear as guest vocalists on the album.

Critical response to Fantasia was largely positive, with most reviewers praising her vocal performance as well as the album's production. Fantasia entered the US Billboard 200 chart at number 19, with first week sales of 133,000 copies. It later surpassed sales of 500,000 copies and was certified gold by the Recording Industry Association of America (RIAA). As with her previous album Free Yourself, the album earned three Grammy Award nominations and produced the R&B hit single "When I See U."

== Promotion ==
Fantasia was preceded by its lead single, "Hood Boy," a Tone Mason-produced up tempo song featuring rapper Big Boi. Released on November 14, 2006, it samples the introduction of the Supremes' 1967 single, "The Happening". The song peaked at number 21 on the US Hot R&B/Hip-Hop Songs chart, but failed to enter the Billboard Hot 100, reaching number three on Bubbling Under Hot 100 Singles only.

"When I See U" was issued as the album's second single on April 17, 2007. It became Fantasia's first single to top the Hot R&B/Hip-Hop Songs chart, remaining at the number one spot for eight consecutive weeks. and stayed on the chart for over a year ranking eighth on Billboard's Best of The 2000s R&B/Hip-Hop Songs decade-end listing. It also reached number 32 on the Billboard Hot 100.

The album's third and final single, "Only One U", produced by Bryan-Michael Cox, peaked at number 19 on the US Adult R&B Airplay chart and number 36 on the Hot R&B/Hip-Hop Songs chart. "Said I Wouldn't (No More)," produced by Flinstone and Soulshock & Karlin and initially recorded for the album, was released as a pre-order track but was not included on the album's final track listing.

== Critical reception ==
Professional ratings
Review scores
Source	Rating
About.com	3.5/5 stars
AllMusic	3.5/5 stars
Entertainment Weekly	B+
PopMatters	7/10
Rolling Stone	3.5/5 stars
Slant	3/5 stars
Stylus	B+
USA Today	3/4 stars

Critical response to Fantasia was largely positive, as reviewers praised her vocals and charisma as well as the album's production; she drew multiple comparisons to Aretha Franklin, Tina Turner and Patti LaBelle. Many critics also commented that the album's decidedly R&B nature (which translates to a reduced audience) was inevitable due to the lack of crossover success from Barrino's debut. AllMusic editor Stephen Thomas Erlewine called it a "more consistent album than her debut; it has a sense of purpose and it takes greater risks in the production, two things which make it a bolder, better album than Free Yourself," adding that it "breaks Barrino free of her American Idol persona, giving her a sound and style that she can build a career upon." Mike Joseph from PopMatters said that "Fantasia is a solid second effort, made above average by that gem of a voice."

Rolling Stone critic Evan Serpick felt the album "expands her range, adds some attitude and comes up with some genuine R&B gems." He called the "ferocious" "Baby Makin' Hips" Fantasia's "best song to date, a potential shout-along classic on par with Mary J.'s "No More Drama" and Kelis' "Caught Out There"." Stylus magazine's Thomas Inskeep praised Fantasia's "rather astounding, multi-octave...voice, capable of the smoothest singing but also heavy on the grit," while at the same time lamenting that she will never be "America's pop star [...] She's too black." He then declared, "Fantasia wasn't meant to be America's pop star, anyway." Sal Cinquemani from Slant Magazine said that "Fantasia's sophomore effort isn't exactly her Breakaway, but it's certainly a more unified artistic statement than 2004's Free Yourself." Ricardo Baca, writing for The Denver Post remarked that Fantasia "is where she steps out from the Idol cloud. It's popped-out, glossed-over R&B – but it's also surprisingly hot and hip-hop-friendly."

=== Accolades ===
On December 6, 2007, Fantasia garnered three 50th Annual Grammy Award nominations, including Best Female R&B Vocal Performance for “When I See U”, Best Contemporary R&B Album for Fantasia, and Best R&B Song for "When I See U".

== Commercial performance ==
Fantasia debuted and peaked at number nineteen on US Billboard 200 chart in the week of December 30, 2006. selling 133,000 copies. It also peaked at number two on Top R&B/Hip-Hop Albums. On June 15, 2007, Fantasia was certified Gold by Recording Industry Association of America (RIAA). In 2010, Billboard reported that the album had sold 530,000 copies in the United States.

== Track listing ==
Fantasia track listing
No.	Title	Writer(s)	Producer(s)	Length
1.	"Hood Boy" (featuring Big Boi)	Johnta Austin; Frank DeVol; Holland-Dozier-Holland; Anthony McIntyre; Antwan Patton	Tone Mason	3:34
2.	"When I See U"	Sam Watters; Louis Biancaniello; Kevin Risto; Waynne Nugent; Janet Sewell; Erika Nuri	Midi Mafia; Mzmeriq	3:37
3.	"I Nominate U"	Vidal Davis; Andre Harris; Balewa Muhammad; Candice Nelson	Dre & Vidal	4:34
4.	"Baby Makin' Hips"	Davis; Vidal; Muhammed; Nelson	Dre & Vidal; Dirty Harry; Don Cheegio^{[a]}	3:21
5.	"Not the Way I Do"	Sean Garrett	Kwamé; Garrett^{[a]}	3:35
6.	"Only One U"	Bryan-Michael Cox; Thabiso Nkhereanye; The Clutch; Ezekiel Lewis; Muhammad; Nelson	Cox	4:00
7.	"I Feel Beautiful"	Diane Warren	Babyface	3:33
8.	"I'm Not That Type"	Missy Elliott	Elliott; Cainon Lamb^{[a]}	4:07
9.	"Uneligible"	Muhammad; Nelson	Danja	3:00
10.	"Two Weeks Notice"	Craig Brockman; Corte Ellis; Elliott	Elliott; Brockman^{[a]}	4:42
11.	"Surround U"	Denzil Miller; Kurt Walker; Kasseem Dean; Lawrence Smith; Makeba Riddick	Swizz Beatz	3:19
12.	"Bore Me (Yawn)" (featuring Ricco Barrino)	Muhammad; Nelson	Danja	2:55
13.	"Sunshine"	Harold Lilly	Lilly; Lamb^{[a]}	3:47
14.	"Bump What Ya Friends Say" (featuring Missy Elliott)	Elliott; Phillip Lees	Elliott; Lees^{[a]}; Soul Diggaz^{[a]}	4:44
Total length:				50:08

Wal-Mart bonus download
No.	Title	Writer(s)	Producer(s)	Length
15.	"Girl like Me"	Davis; Vidal; Kandi Burruss; Meredith Spears	Dre & Vidal	4:20
Total length:				54:28

Promotional bonus CD
No.	Title	Writer(s)	Producer(s)	Length
15.	"Said I Wouldn't (No More)"	Soulshock & Karlin; Marie Simmons; Francisco C. Santa Cruz; Lonny Bereal	Soulshock & Karlin	3:26
Total length:				53:34

Notes

- ^{^[a]} signifies co-producer

Sample credits

- "Hood Boy" interpolates "The Happening" by American pop band The Supremes.
- "Surround U" contains a sample from "Cross the Track (We Better Go Back)" by Maceo and the Macks, and "Christmas Rappin'" by Kurtis Blow.

== Charts ==
=== Weekly charts ===
Weekly chart performance for Fantasia
Chart (2007)	Peak position
US Billboard 200	19
US Top R&B/Hip-Hop Albums (Billboard)	3

=== Year-end charts ===
Year-end chart performance for Fantasia
Chart (2007)	Position
US Billboard 200	105
US Top R&B/Hip-Hop Albums (Billboard)	22

== Certifications ==
Certifications for Fantasia
Region	Certification	Certified units/sales
United States (RIAA)	Gold	530,000

== Release history ==
Release dates and formats for Fantasia
Region	Date	Format(s)	Label(s)	Ref.
United Kingdom	December 11, 2006	CD; digital download	J; 19	
United States	December 12, 2006	CD; digital download	J; 19	
