= Christmas After Midnight =

Studio album by Fantasia
- Released: October 6, 2017
- Recorded: 2017
- Length: 39:14
- Label: Concord
- Producer: Ron Fair

Fantasia chronology
The Definition Of... (2016)	Christmas After Midnight (2017)	Sketchbook (2019)

Christmas After Midnight is the first Christmas album, and sixth studio album, by American recording artist Fantasia. It was released by Concord Records on October 6, 2017, in the United States, serving as the singer's debut release with the label after departing from RCA soon after releasing her previous album, The Definition Of... (2016). Chiefly produced by frequent collaborator Ron Fair, the album was recorded in Los Angeles and Nashville, compromising a festive mix of renditions of Fantasia's favorite rock, soul, jazz, funk, and blues holiday classics. Upon its release, the album debuted at number five on Billboard's Top Holiday Albums chart.

== Critical reception ==
Professional ratings
Review scores
Source	Rating
Entertainment Weekly	A−

Eric Renner Brown from Entertainment Weekly gave the album an A− rating and wrote: "Sure, the American Idol winner makes downtempo classics from "Have Yourself a Merry Little Christmas" to "Silent Night" glisten. But the standouts on her first holiday album are impassioned, upbeat takes on Ray Charles ("The Snow Is Falling") and James Brown ("Santa Claus Go Straight to the Ghetto"). Writing for Variety, Chris Willman found that "Fantasia has made a smart call to go with brassy but far from overbearing horn arrangements in this jazz-skirting pop/R&B collection." He praised Fantasia for the revival of "The Snow is Falling," but criticized labeling Leonard Cohen's "Hallelujah" as a Christmas song.

== Commercial performance ==
Christmas After Midnight opened and peaked at number 193 on the US Billboard 200 and missed the Top R&B/Hip-Hop Albums chart, becoming Fantasia's lowest-charting album so far. It reached number 23 on the Top R&B Albums chart, however, and entered the Top Holiday Albums at number three.

== Track listing ==
Christmas After Midnight track listing
No.	Title	Writer(s)	Length
1.	"This Christmas"	Donny Hathaway; Nadine McKinnor	3:22
2.	"Santa Claus Go Straight to the Ghetto"	Alfred Ellis; James Brown; Hank Ballard	3:20
3.	"The Snow Is Falling"	Jerry Leiber; Mike Stoller	2:55
4.	"Baby, It's Cold Outside" (featuring CeeLo Green)	Frank Loesser	2:53
5.	"The Christmas Song (Chestnuts Roasting on an Open Fire)"	Bob Wells; Mel Tormé	2:57
6.	"Give Love on Christmas Day"	The Corporation	4:05
7.	"Merry Christmas Baby"	Lou Baxter; Johnny Moore	2:34
8.	"Silent Night"	Franz Gruber; Joseph Mohr	3:50
9.	"Have Yourself a Merry Little Christmas"	Ralph Blane; Hugh Martin	3:19
10.	"What Are You Doing New Year's Eve?"	Loesser	3:09
11.	"In the Wee Small Hours of the Morning"	David Mann; Bob Hilliard	2:28
12.	"Hallelujah"	Leonard Cohen	4:23
Total length:			39:14

Christmas After Midnight – Target edition
No.	Title	Writer(s)	Length
13.	"Jingle Bell Rock"	Joe Beal; Jim Boothe	2:56
14.	"Auld Lang Syne"	Robert Burns	3:06

== Charts ==
Chart (2017)	Peak position
US Billboard 200	193
US Top Holiday Albums (Billboard)	3
