= The Gospel of Christmas =

2026 film by Tyler Perry

- Release poster
- Directed by: Tyler Perry
- Screenplay by: Tyler Perry
- Produced by: Tyler Perry; Angi Bones; Tony L. Strickland
- Starring: Fantasia Barrino; Durrell Babbs; Cece Winans; Chante Moore; Yolanda Adams; Ricco Ross; Smokie Norful; John Gray; Fred Hammond; Shirley Caesar; Le'Andria Johnson; Hezekiah Walker; The Clark Sisters
- Cinematography: Justyn Moro
- Edited by: Nick Coker
- Music by: Amanda Jones
- Production company: Tyler Perry Studios
- Distributed by: Netflix
- Release dates: November 9, 2026 (Tabernacle); November 11, 2026 (Netflix)
- Running time: 105 minutes
- Country: United States
- Language: English

The Gospel of Christmas is a 2026 American musical Christmas film written and directed by Tyler Perry. The cast is led by Fantasia Barrino and Durrell Babbs. It was released on November 11, 2026 on Netflix.

== Plot ==
Isaac Jefferson, a former R&B artist, performs in a barely occupied bar during the holiday season in New York. Being discouraged from the lack of enthusiasm for his performance, Isaac hurries outside getting struck by a car. During this life changing moment, Isaac decides to bargain with God, his commitment to the church for the Lord sparing his life.

Back in Georgia having left his old dreams behind, Isaac is at his fathers bedside. Gravely ill, he asks Isaac to go back to New York to pastor his great grandfathers neglected and dilapidated church. Knowing he's not nearly as capable or into the church as his older brother, he ruminates on the idea, ultimately deciding to go with his wife, Rebecca, and two sons, Jacob and their nonverbal son, Esau to New York.

The church is maintained by the upbeat Deacon Daniel who welcomes the family to reside in the living quarters above the church. While settling in, Isaac sees that the church is debt for over $50,000. Deacon Daniel admits that he's aware but not much can be done with the church's conditions and the neighborhood thriving in malfeasance.

Adjusting to the new life he's committed to, Isaac runs into an old show promoter, Ethmai Lived who reminds Isaac of his hits and high times as an R&B artist. Expressing interest in Isaac's past and not his presence, he reassures Isaac that he still has fans who'd like to hear his old music and offers him to come perform at his club anytime he wants to step away from the pulpit.

Now facing the opportunity to go back to his old life as a singer or face challenges with the new life he promised God to commit to as a pastor, Isaac's journey encounters temptations, reunions, and a deal he couldn't escape.

== Cast ==
- Fantasia Barrino as Rebecca Jefferson
- Durrell Babbs as Rev. Isaac Jefferson
- Mason Douglas as Jacob Jefferson
- Shirley Caesar as May
- Fred Hammond as Abraham
- Smokie Norful as Peter Jefferson
- Vanessa Bell Armstrong as Choir Member
- Ann Nesby as Sarah Jefferson
- Yolanda Adams as Gloria
- Hezekiah Walker as Matthew
- Jekalyn Carr as Lilly Jefferson
- CeCe Winans as Mrs. Johnson
- Chanté Moore as Juanita Sherman
- Le'Andria Johnson as Eve
- Karen Clark-Sheard as Lynn
- Dorinda Clark-Cole as Pearl
- Twinkie Clark as Susan
- Jacky Clark-Chisholm as Bella

== Production ==
The film is written, directed, and produced by Tyler Perry and has music produced by Kirk Franklin, with a cast featuring several gospel music and R&B artists.

The cast includes Fantasia Barrino and Durrell Babbs as husband and wife, as well as CeCe Winans, Shirley Caesar, Yolanda Adams, Fred Hammond, Smokie Norful, Jekalyn Carr, Hezekiah Walker, Le'Andria Johnson, and Vanessa Bell Armstrong, along with Ann Nesby and Chanté Moore.

Principal photography began in Atlanta on November 5, 2025, and concluded on December. First-look images from filming were released to the media in October 2026. Amanda Jones composed the score for the film.

== Release ==
The film premiered at the Tabernacle in Atlanta on November 9, 2026, and was released on November 11, 2026 on Netflix.
