= Hood Boy =

Single by Fantasia featuring Big Boi

from the album Fantasia
- Released: November 14, 2006
- Genre: R&B; hip hop
- Length: 3:34
- Label: J
- Songwriters: Johnta Austin; Frank DeVol; Holland-Dozier-Holland; Anthony McIntyre; Antwan Patton
- Producers: Tone Mason; Austin

Fantasia singles chronology
"Ain't Gon' Beg You" (2005)	"Hood Boy" (2006)	"When I See U" (2007)

Big Boi singles chronology
"Margarita" (2006)	"Hood Boy" (2006)	"Royal Flush" (2008)

"Hood Boy" is a song by American singer Fantasia featuring American rapper Big Boi, from her second and eponymous studio album (2006). It was released as the album's lead single by J Records on November 14, 2006. "Hood Boy" was written by Johnta Austin, Anthony McIntyre and Antwan Patton (and credits Holland-Dozier-Holland and Frank DeVol through its sample), and produced by Austin and the Canadian production team Tone Mason. It samples the introduction of the Supremes' 1967 single, "The Happening". An uptempo R&B and hip hop song, "Hood Boy" explores Fantasia's appreciation for thugs.

The song's reception was mostly positive; music critics praised its composition and Fantasia's vocals. The single appeared on several United States Billboard charts, peaking at number three on the Bubbling Under Hot 100 Singles chart. According to one commentator, the song was successful on urban radio. Its music video, directed by Norwegian photographer Ray Kay, was released on November 30, 2006. In the video, Fantasia sings and dances in a barbershop and in front of a neon sign and Big Boi performs his verses. To further promote "Hood Boy", Fantasia performed it at the 2011 Artscape festival and the 2018 Essence Music Festival.

== Background and release ==
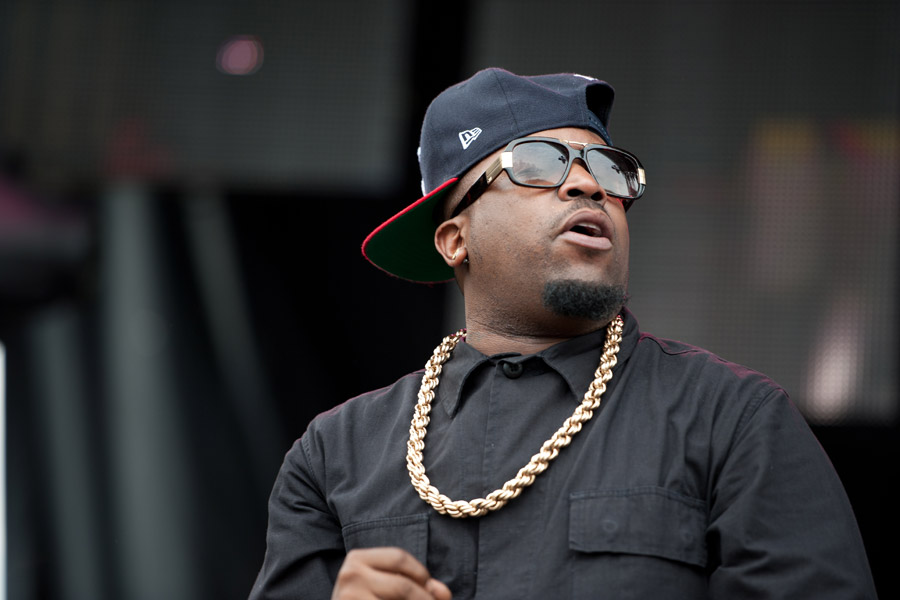
American rapper Big Boi (pictured in 2012) co-wrote "Hood Boy" and contributes several verses.

Due to the lukewarm commercial performance of – and mixed critical response to – Fantasia's 2004 debut pop album (Free Yourself), she and J Records decided to record more R&B and hip hop for her second and eponymous album (2006). In her biography of Fantasia, Liz Sonneborn wrote that the singer "purposely cultivated a more daring sound" on her follow-up record. Fantasia attributed the change in her musical style as an escape from her painful past, which was featured on the American reality competition series American Idol: "I'm not sad anymore; I'm not hurting anymore. I'm able to show people what music is to me."

"Hood Boy" was written by Johnta Austin, Frank DeVol, Holland-Dozier-Holland, Anthony McIntyre, Antwan Patton, and produced by Austin and the Canadian production team Tone Mason. The track was mixed by Manny Marroquin and engineered by Aaron Fessel, Tatsuya Sato, and Chris Caramouche. It was released on November 14, 2006, as the lead single from Fantasia. The song was released as an audio CD, which includes the radio edit and instrumental, and as a digital download. An 11-track remix extended play (EP), Dance Vault Mixes, was released on February 20, 2007, as a digital download.

== Composition and lyrics ==
"Hood Boy" is an uptempo three-minute, 34-second R&B and hip hop song. It samples the opening of the Supremes' 1967 song, "The Happening", and has verses by the American rapper Big Boi. The song's instrumentation includes an "opening salvo of horns". Stephen Thomas Erlewine of AllMusic called it a modern interpretation of Ike & Tina Turner's music, and AXS's Kareem Gantt described the track as "a buffet of neo-soul mixed in with hip-hop". Slant Magazine's Sal Cinquemani cited the song as an example of the album's emphasis on production over vocals. "Hood Boy"'s lyrics explore Fantasia's attraction to thugs, and Erlewine compared the song to Destiny's Child's 2004 single "Soldier". Curve's Margaret Coble saw it as a "radio-friendly thug ode". The track includes references to "wifebeaters and chains" and "some sexual innuendos and the 'N' word".

== Reception ==
Critical reaction to "Hood Boy" was positive, with Kareem Gantt including it on his list of top ten Fantasia songs. Stephen Thomas Erlewine praised the singer's performance, writing that she "remakes herself into a vibrant, vital diva". A Stereogum writer called Fantasia's voice a "raspy, divalicious vox". Henry Goldblatt of Entertainment Weekly described "Hood Boy" as 2006's strongest R&B release, and Michael Slezak called it "infectiously funky" and an "electrifying romp". Clover Hope of Billboard praised Fantasia's connection to the song, calling the tracks on more mature subjects "right up [the singer's] alley". However, Allison Steward of The Washington Post criticized "Hood Boy" as "credibility-shredding".

The song appeared on several United States Billboard charts. It peaked at number three on the Bubbling Under Hot 100 Singles chart on December 30, 2006, and remained on the chart for four weeks. The song reached number 67 on Hot 100 Airplay in January 2007, and stayed on the chart for four weeks. It peaked at number 21 on the Hot R&B/Hip-Hop Songs chart on January 20, 2007, and remained on the chart for 19 weeks. The song also reached number 21 on the R&B/Hip-Hop Airplay chart that day, remaining on that chart for 16 weeks. Jim Cantiello of MTV wrote that the single and its 2007 follow-up, "When I See U", were successful on urban radio.

== Music video and live performances ==
A music video for "Hood Boy", directed by Norwegian photographer Ray Kay, premiered on November 30, 2006, on BET. It was filmed in Crenshaw, Los Angeles; when describing the location, Fantasia said: "If you want to find a 'hood boy, you got to go to the 'hood to find one, and no better place to do it than Crenshaw." In the video, Fantasia performs in front of a pink neon sign displaying her name; Michael Slezak compared the scene to Roxie Hart in the 1972 musical, Chicago. The singer also wears a short skirt, dancing in a barbershop and riding a motorcycle. Fantasia has a fauxhawk and large false eyelashes in some scenes, and Big Boi appears in others. The video ends with the police stopping a dance and Fantasia strutting away. Slezak praised the singer's confidence in the video.

To further promote the single, Fantasia performed it at the 2011 Artscape festival to a positive audience response. She also sang it as part of the 2018 Essence Music Festival.

"Hood Boy" was featured in an eleventh season episode of RuPaul's Drag Race as part of a lip-sync battle between Vanessa Vanjie Mateo and Plastique Tiara to determine who would be eliminated from the competition; the lip-sync resulted in Plastique Tiara being eliminated.

== Track listings ==
CD single
No.	Title	Length
1.	"Hood Boy" (radio edit)	3:40
2.	"Hood Boy" (radio edit – no rap)	2:58
3.	"Hood Boy" (Instrumental)	3:40
4.	"Hood Boy" (call out hook)	0:10

Digital download
No.	Title	Length
1.	"Hood Boy" (featuring Big Boi) (radio edit)	3:40

Digital download (Dance Vault Mixes)
No.	Title	Length
1.	"Hood Boy" (featuring Big Boi) (Ultimix Mixshow)	4:19
2.	"Hood Boy" (featuring Big Boi) (Ultimix Mixshow 2)	3:48
3.	"Hood Boy" (featuring Big Boi) (Migtight Electro Mixshow)	5:35
4.	"Hood Boy" (featuring Big Boi) (Migtight Electro Radio)	3:45
5.	"Hood Boy" (featuring Big Boi) (Migtight Electro Instrumental)	3:46
6.	"Hood Boy" (featuring Big Boi) (Migtight Electro Accapella)	3:16
7.	"Hood Boy" (featuring Big Boi) (ICDM Club Mix)	5:19
8.	"Hood Boy" (featuring Big Boi) (ICDM Radio Mix)	3:14
9.	"Hood Boy" (featuring Big Boi) (Radio Mix – Without Rap)	3:00
10.	"Hood Boy" (featuring Big Boi) (Instrumental)	3:43
11.	"Hood Boy" (featuring Big Big) (Acappella)	3:21

== Personnel ==
Credits adapted from Tidal.

- Fantasia – vocals
- Eddie Holland Jr. – composer, lyrics
- Frank DeVol – composer, lyrics
- Brian Holland – composer, lyrics
- Anthony McIntyre – composer, lyrics
- Antwan Patton – composer, lyrics
- Johntá Austin – composer, lyrics, production
- Lamont Dozier – composer, lyrics
- Tone Mason – production
- Manny Marroquin – mixing engineer
- Aaron Fessel – recording engineer
- Tatsuya Sato – recording engineer
- Chris Caramouche – recording engineer

== Charts ==
=== Weekly charts ===
Chart (2006–2007)	Peak position
US Bubbling Under Hot 100 (Billboard)	3
US Hot R&B/Hip-Hop Songs (Billboard)	21

=== Year-end charts ===
Chart (2007)	Position
US Hot R&B/Hip-Hop Songs (Billboard)	95

== Release history ==
Region	Format	Date	Label
United States	Audio CD, digital download	November 14, 2006	J
United States	Remix package	February 20, 2007	J
