= Tone Mason =

Canadian musical group

- Origin: Toronto, Ontario, Canada
- Genres: Hip hop
- Occupation: Record producers
- Instruments: Sampler, drum machine, virtual instrument
- Years active: 2002–present
- Labels: Tone Mason Music Inc.
- Members: Don D. Mellenius
- Past members: Aloysius Brown
- Website: Official Website

Tone Mason is a Canadian hip-hop and R&B production team from Toronto, Ontario, composed of Mellenius, Don D, and formerly, Aloysius Brown. They have contributed their music to MuchMusic & MuchVibe (theme music for The Vibe, The Downlo), Barbershop: The Next Cut, BET, EA Sports, Russell Peters' Red, White and Brown and many more.

== History ==
Don D. began his career in the 1990s as a member of underground hip hop group Nefarius. He served as the group's DJ and producer. After the death of group member MC Kwesro in 1999, he and MC Collizhun (the other member) released an EP, Tough Dumplin' Foundation For Better Beats, before eventually parting ways. Before the fall of Nefarius, he met Aloysius Brown and Mellenius, and the three acted as "production protégés" for each other. Don D. thought it would be shameful for their material to go unheard, so they formed Tone Mason.

In 2003, the group produced "Back Where I've Stayed" for Choclair's Juno Award-winning album, Flagrant. They also produced Fantasia Barrino's hit single "Hood Boy" in 2006.

== Discography ==
=== Singles ===
- "The Throwback" ft. BrassMunk, Graph Nobel and G-Stokes

=== Production credits ===
- "Stadium Music" - Lil Kim ft. Yo Gotti
- "The Color Purple" - Freddie Gibbs
- "Double Up" - 50 Cent ft. Hayes
- "Light Up" – Drake ft. Jay-Z
- "Hood Boy" – Fantasia ft. Big Boi
- "We Got the Streets" – Busta Rhymes ft. Papoose, Spliff Star, Labba, Reek da Villain, Rah Digga and Yummy Bingham
- "High Speed Chasin" – Rah Digga ft. Mobb Deep
- "Hot Like the Summer" – Saukrates ft. Andreena Mill
- "Black Girl Pain" – Talib Kweli ft. Jean Grae and Yummy Bingham
- "My Girl" – Lloyd Banks
- "Magic Hour" – AZ ft. CL Smooth
- "Boom Bye Yeah" – Sean Price
- "Lil' Bro" – Ric-a-Che
- "Fire in Ya Eyes" – JB ft. The Game
- "Back Where I've Stayed" – Choclair
- "Filthy" – Rascalz
- "A New Day" – Rochester
- "Struggle" – Eternia ft. Wordsworth and Kenn Starr
- "God Only Knows" – Point Blank
- "Salt n Pepper" – Saukrates ft. Rich Kidd
- "Time" – Theo 3
- "Blaow" – Frank n Dank ft. Lindo P
- "Reach" – Frankie Payne
- "Full Nelson" – Redman ft. Ready Roc, Runt Dawg and Saukrates
- "En La Noche" - Fito Blanko
- "Life" - The Game
- "What It Is" - Sheek Louch ft. Styles P (co-produced by C- Sharp)
- "For The People" - Ice Cube ft. Common
- "Let's Go" - Tassnata ft. Rich Kidd & Tona
- "Designated Driver" - Maestro ft. Skyzoo
- "Day N Nite" - Kennedy Rd.
- "Like Them" - Jeezy ft. Rick Ross & Tory Lanez

Television and DVD appearances

- Theme/Lead Single for Barbershop: The Next Cut ("For The People" - Ice Cube ft. Common)
- Theme/Intro Music for MuchVibe (TV channel) and TV series
- Theme/Back Drop Music for The Score Television Network and Cabbie Unlimited
- Back Drop/Soundscape Music for BET's Iron Ring
- Back Drop/Soundscape Music for Russell Peters: Red, White, and Brown DVD Extras
