= Sketchbook (album) =

Studio album by Fantasia
- Released: October 11, 2019
- Genre: R&B
- Length: 43:50
- Label: Rock Soul
- Producer: Jevan Hill, Green Semexant, Jimmy Hill Jr, Tom Laskey, Stanley Green, Theodore Thomas, Dave James and KJ Scriven

Fantasia chronology
Christmas After Midnight (2017)	Sketchbook (2019)

Singles from Sketchbook
- 1. "Enough" Released: May 3, 2019; 2. "PTSD" Released: August 23, 2019; 3. "Holy Ghost" Released: September 20, 2019

Sketchbook is the seventh studio album by American singer Fantasia. Backed by a distribution deal with BMG Rights Management, it was released by her own label, Rock Soul Inc., on October 11, 2019.

The album debuted and peaked at number 62 on the US Billboard 200. The song "Enough" was released in May 2019 as the album's lead single followed by "PTSD" featuring T-Pain. A music video for the song "Bad Girl" premiered with the album's release. Sketchbook was promoted by appearances at award shows and talk shows, as well as a North American tour supported by Robin Thicke, Tank, and singer The Bonfyre in the fall of 2019. The latter two would appear on a remix of "PTSD" released digitally and serviced to United States urban contemporary radio in November of the same year.

== Critical reception ==
Professional ratings
Review scores
Source	Rating
AllMusic	3/5 stars

Andy Kellman from Allmusic rated the album three out of five stars. He found that "contrary to the title, nothing sounds incomplete or even off-the-cuff. It's more like a lookbook. Skittering percussion and other mechanical, trap-styled production touches are most common [...] It merely hints at what Fantasia might be able to do if she took a truly sketchbook-like approach in the studio. There's no telling what she'd cook up in a couple weeks of live recording with a small band fluent in funk and rock." Associated Press journalist Melanie J. Sims felt that Fantasia "is staying true to her artistry on Sketchbook, her first independent release. She delivers the fullness of her voice on the sexy, guitar-laced "Believer" and the easygoing "Enough"; pours her honeyed vocals over the island-influenced beat of "Take Off"; and experiments with a rock feel on "Warning" [...] thankfully Fantasia makes Sketchbook a work of art." She also join Tamron Hall Show for her new single, Including six year old Naomi DeBerry, and one more surprise, Tamron Hall announced that Sketchbook Tour would be given out to the audience during the show’s premiere.

== Commercial performance ==
Sketchbook debuted at number 62 on the US Billboard 200 and number 33 on the Top R&B/Hip-Hop Albums with 10,000 album equivalent units. This marked her lowest first week placement as well as her first studio album of original material to debut outside of the top 20 of the Billboard 200.

== Track listing ==
Track listing adapted from the iTunes Store.

No.	Title	Writer(s)	Producer(s)	Length
1.	"History"	Fantasia Barrino; Candace Wakefield; Jovan Dawkins; Jevon Hill; Stanley Green; Jean Semexant	Jevon Hill; Green; Semexant	3:33
2.	"PTSD" (featuring T-Pain)	Barrino; Eric Mackey; Faheem Najm; Jevon Hill; Green; Semexant	Jevon Hill; Green; Semexant	3:59
3.	"Believer"	Barrino; Wakefield; Dawkins; Hill; Green; Bernard Glover; Arthur Jones	Jevon Hill; Green; Jimmy Hill, Jr.	4:01
4.	"Enough"	Barrino; Danni Baylor; Jerome Baylor; Hill; Green; Jimmy Hill, Jr.	Jevon Hill; Green; Jimmy Hill, Jr.	4:33
5.	"The Way!"	Barrino; Baylor; Baylor; Hill; Green; Tom Laskey	Jevon Hill; Green; Laskey	2:06
6.	"Bad Girl"	Barrino; Carmael Frith; Hill; Green; Theodore Thomas	Jevon Hill; Green; Frith; Thomas	3:38
7.	"Free"	Barrino; Wakefield; Dawkins; Kendall Taylor; Hill; Green; Semexant	Jevon Hill; Green; Semexant	3:30
8.	"Holy Ghost"	Barrino; Wakefield; Dawkins; Taylor; Hill; Green; Semexant	Jevon Hill; Green; Semexant	3:12
9.	"Take Off"	Barrino; Bianca Atterberry; Green; Hill; Semexant	Jevon Hill; Green; Semexant	3:41
10.	"Fighting"	Barrino; Baylor; Baylor; Hill; Green; Semexant	Jevon Hill; Green; Semexant	3:46
11.	"Warning"	Barrino; Baylor; Baylor; Hill; Green; Hill Jr.	Jevon Hill; Green; Jimmy Hill, Jr.	3:46
12.	"Looking for You" (featuring Mama Diane)	Barrino; Reginald Scriven; David James	Dave James; KJ Scriven	4:18

== Charts ==
Chart (2019)	Peak position
US Billboard 200	62
US Top R&B/Hip-Hop Albums (Billboard)	33
US Independent Albums (Billboard)	5
