= I'm Doin' Me =

Single by Fantasia

from the album Back to Me
- Released: September 28, 2010
- Length: 3:56
- Label: J
- Songwriters: Charles Harmon; Claude Kelly
- Producer: Chuck Harmony

Fantasia singles chronology
| "Bittersweet" (2010) | "I'm Doin' Me" (2010) | "Collard Greens & Cornbread" (2011) |

"I'm Doin' Me" is a song performed by the American singer Fantasia from her third album, Back to Me (2010). The song was released by J Records on September 28, 2010, serving as the second single from the album.

== Critical reception ==
Ken Capobianco of The Boston Globe described the song as an "insistent declaration of self" that "is more about love in all its incarnations: passionate, regretful, angry, and tender". Trent of That Grape Juice reviewed the song more positively, calling it a "brilliant" "motivational track" which makes "a bold statement about self-worth" and is "brought to life by Fantasia’s soulful conviction and clever vocal arrangements".

== Live performances ==
Fantasia performed the song live on Lopez Tonight on August 26, 2010, BET's 106 & Park on September 8, 2010, Regis & Kelly on September 9, 2010 and on The Wendy Williams Show on September 10, 2010.

== Chart performance ==
"I'm Doin' Me" debuted at number 97 on the US Billboard Hot R&B/Hip-Hop Songs chart, peaking at number 11 after spending 17 weeks on the chart. It also peaked at number 60 on the US Billboard Radio Songs chart. It has sold 29,000 copies in the United States.

== Music video ==
A music video for the song was directed by Benny Boom and was reportedly shot on October 8–9 suggested by a behind-the-scenes video which was released on October. It premiered on Vevo.com on November 3, 2010. In the video, Fantasia catches her boyfriend with another girl, but rather than making a scene she starts a dance party with her girls and the whole restaurant joins in. Her optimistic attitude takes to the streets and the local park as she croons the importance of taking care of number one, herself.

== Charts ==
=== Weekly charts ===
Weekly chart performance for "I'm Doin' Me"
| Chart (2010–11) | Peak position |
|---|---|
| US Hot R&B/Hip-Hop Songs (Billboard) | 11 |
| US Radio Songs (Billboard) | 60 |

=== Year-end charts ===
Year-end chart performance for "I'm Doin' Me"
| Chart (2011) | Peak position |
|---|---|
| US Hot R&B/Hip-Hop Songs (Billboard) | 45 |
