= Side Effects of You =

Studio album by Fantasia
- Released: April 19, 2013
- Genres: Rock; soul; R&B
- Length: 45:59
- Labels: RCA; 19
- Producers: Naughty Boy; Harmony Samuels

Fantasia chronology
Back to Me (2010)	Side Effects of You (2013)	The Definition Of... (2016)

Singles from Side Effects of You
- 1. "Lose to Win" Released: January 8, 2013; 2. "Without Me" Released: April 17, 2013; 3. "Side Effects of You" Released: October 8, 2013

Side Effects of You is the fourth studio album by American singer Fantasia. It was released in the United States on April 23, 2013, by RCA Records after the disbanding of her former label J Records in 2011. Dubbed as a rock soul album, it was primarily produced by Harmony Samuels whom Fantasia called her "Quincy Jones," referring to their creation process. British DJ Naughty Boy contributed the title track, while guest vocals were provided by rappers Big K.R.I.T. and Missy Elliott, and singer Kelly Rowland.

The album earned largely positive reviews, who complimented its progression from Fantasia's earlier works. As with her previous project Back to Me (2010), Side Effects of You debuted and peaked at number two on the US Billboard 200 and reached the top of the R&B/Hip-Hop Albums chart. By 2016, it had sold 300,000 copies domestically. The album received three Grammy Award nominations, including Best Progressive R&B Album. In the summer of 2013, Barrino promoted the album with the Side Effects of You Tour.

== Singles ==
The album's lead single, "Lose to Win", was released on January 8, 2013. On March 4, 2013, the music video for "Lose to Win" was released. On April 17, 2013, the album's second single, "Without Me" featuring Kelly Rowland and Missy Elliott was released. On July 1, 2013, the music video was released for "Without Me" featuring Kelly Rowland and Missy Elliott. On October 8, 2013, the album's third single, "Side Effects of You" was released.

== Critical response ==
Professional ratings
Review scores
Source	Rating
AllMusic	4/5 stars
Today	3/5 stars

Side Effects of You received generally favorable reviews from music critics, who complimented its progression from Fantasia's earlier works. Andy Kellman from AllMusic complimented her prominent role in its production and her choice in collaborators, adding that she "has released her finest album yet." SoulTracks editor Melody Charles found that Side Effects of You was "a lot like its creator and co-author: enthralling ("In Deep"), engaging ("To The Heavens") and at times, uneven in execution ("Haunted") [...] Experiencing her still-evolving prowess as a person and performer is just like her most recent American Idol set: bold, brash and beautiful to behold."

Gerrick D. Kennedy from The Los Angeles Times praised the project as "sumptuous contemporary R&B dipped in vintage rock and soul," with Billboard noting: "More international in flavor and more adventurous than earlier outings, Side Effects of You gives Fantasia the chance to fully show off her vocal versatility." Bianca Roach, writing for Times Colonist, found that Side Effects of You "reminds us exactly why she captured our hearts to win 2004's American Idol. [She] declares a whole new lease on life, delivering a more mature, no-nonsense version of her former self." Today's Christopher Toh felt that "this offering is, for some reason, rather melodramatic and rhythmically annoying, but one can't really fault her vocal performance much."

== Commercial performance ==
The album debuted at number two on the US Billboard 200 chart, with first-week sales of 91,000 copies in the United States. The top-selling R&B album of the week, it also debuted at number-one on the Top R&B/Hip-Hop Albums chart, becoming her second consecutive album to do so. By May 2016, Side Effects of You had sold 300,000 copies in the United States.

== Track listing ==
Side Effects of You track listing
No.	Title	Writer(s)	Producer(s)	Length
1.	"Supernatural Love" (featuring Big K.R.I.T.)	Harmony Samuels; Al Sherrod Lambert; Adonis Shropshire; Tiwa Savage; Tiffany Fred; Carlos Coleman	Harmony Samuels^{[a]}; Lambert^{[b]}	3:48
2.	"Ain’t All Bad"	Fantasia Barrino; Samuels; A. Lambert; Courtney Harrell; Andrew Scott	Samuels^{[a]}	3:57
3.	"If I Was a Bird"	Barrino; Samuels; Thomas; Lumpkin	Samuels^{[a]}	2:47
4.	"Girl Talk (Interlude)"			1:47
5.	"Without Me" (featuring Kelly Rowland & Missy Elliott)	Barrino; Samuels; A. Lambert; Melissa Elliott; Kyle Stewart	Samuels^{[a]}; Lonny Bereal^{[b]}	4:30
6.	"Side Effects of You"	Emeli Sandé; Shahid Khan; Claudia Bryant; Ben Harrison	Naughty Boy; Craze & Hoax^{[c]}	3:25
7.	"Get It Right"	Samuels; A. Lambert; Sevyn Streeter	Samuels^{[a]}	3:45
8.	"So Much to Prove"	Barrino; Samuels; Harrell; Eric Bellinger	Samuels^{[a]}; Lambert^{[b]}	2:28
9.	"Change Your Mind"	Barrino; Samuels; Harrell; Antonio Reid; Babyface	Samuels^{[a]}	3:27
10.	"Lighthouse"	Samuels; Evan Bogart; Vanessa Brown	Samuels^{[a]}	4:16
11.	"Lose to Win"	Barrino; Samuels; Andrea Martin; Franne Golde; Dennis Lambert; Walter Orange	Samuels; Martin^{[a]}	4:12
12.	"End of Me"	Samuels; A. Lambert; Streeter; Narada Michael Walden; Jeffrey Cohen; Walter Afanasieff	Samuels^{[a]}	4:05
13.	"In Deep"	Samuels; Harrell; Marty James; Fransisca Hall	Samuels^{[a]}	3:33
Total length:				45:59

Deluxe edition bonus tracks
No.	Title	Writer(s)	Producer(s)	Length
14.	"Haunted" (featuring Tank, King Los, Al Sherrod Lambert & Jamia)	Barrino; Samuels; A. Lambert; Jamia Nash	Samuels^{[a]}	4:37
15.	"To the Heavens"	Barrino; Bogart; Brown; Samuels	Samuels^{[a]}	3:36

Notes

- ^{^a} denotes producer(s) and vocal producer(s)
- ^{^b} denotes vocal producer(s) only
- ^{^b} denotes additional producer(s)

Sample credits

- "Change Your Mind" contains a portion from "I'm Your Baby Tonight" as performed by Whitney Houston.
- "Lose to Win" contains a sample from "Nightshift" as performed by the Commodores.

== Charts ==
=== Weekly charts ===
Weekly chart performance for Side Effects of You
Chart (2013)	Peak position
UK R&B Albums (Official Charts)	38
US Billboard 200	2
US Top R&B/Hip-Hop Albums (Billboard)	1

=== Year-end charts ===
Year-end chart performance for Side Effects of You
Chart (2013)	Position
US Billboard 200	104
US Top R&B/Hip-Hop Albums (Billboard)	22

== Release history ==
Release dates and formats for Side Effects of You
Region	Date	Format(s)	Label(s)	Ref.
United Kingdom	April 19, 2013	CD; digital download	RCA; 19	
United States	April 23, 2013	CD; digital download	RCA; 19	
