= The Marching 101 =

Marching band of South Carolina State University

Marching 101
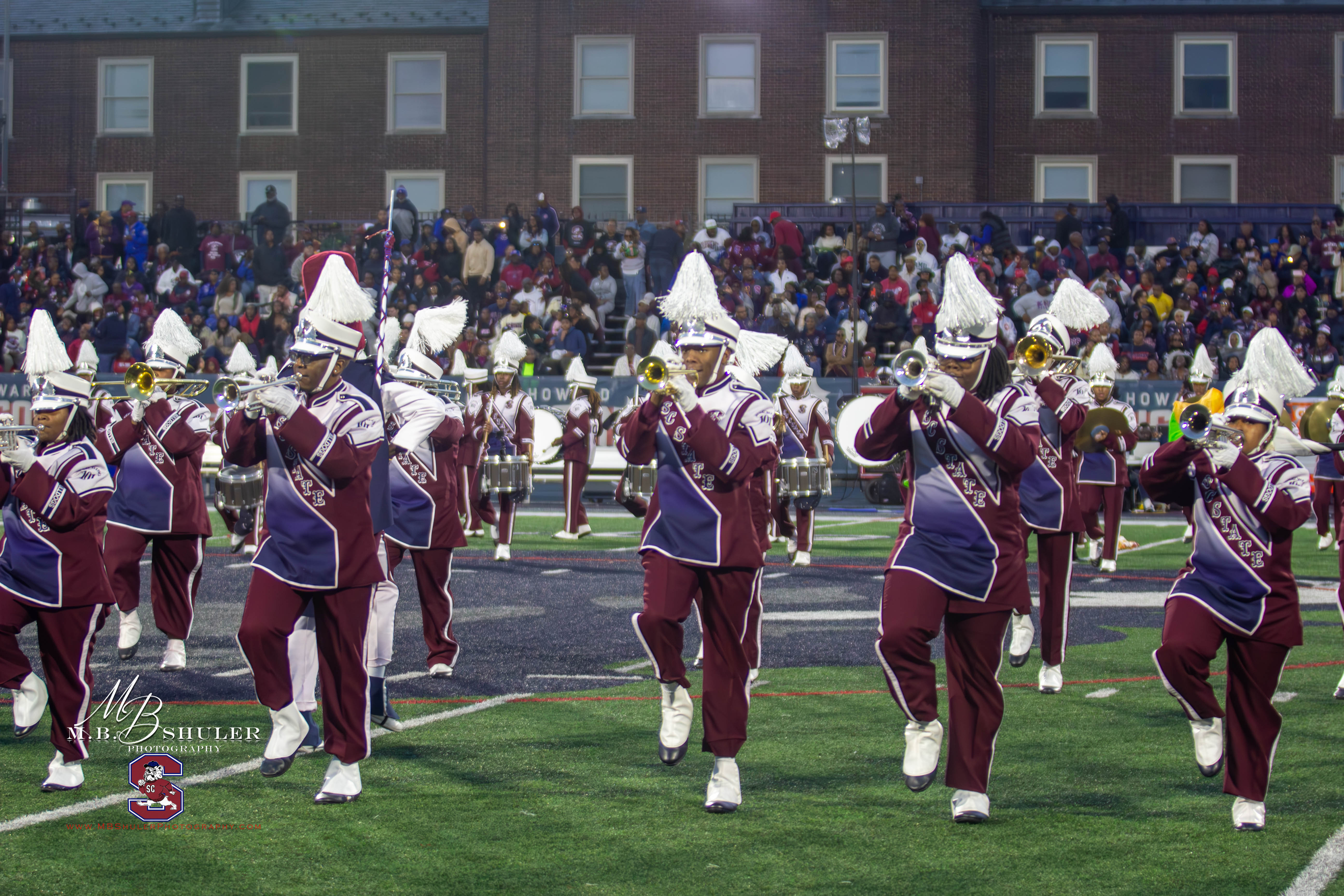
- School: South Carolina State University
- Location: Orangeburg, SC
- Conference: MEAC
- Founded: 1918
- Members: 275+

The Marching 101 is the official name of the marching band at South Carolina State University in Orangeburg, South Carolina. The current director of the band is Dr. J. Nicholas.

== History ==
The marching band began in 1918 as a regimental band performing military drills and assisting with music at Sunday schools. The band evolved from a service band to a part of the school's Department of Music. In the fall of 1964, the band debuted its new name, The SC State Marching 101 Band.

== Appearances ==
The 101 has made many appearances throughout the country, ranging from local events and bowl parades to NFL games. They have also appeared in the VH1 movie Drumline: A New Beat and won Atlanta's annual Honda Battle of the Bands competition in 2011 and 2014. On May 15, 2025, the official video for the Boots on the ground (song) featuring the band debuted on May 15, 2025 on the Sherri Shepherd Show.

== Rivalries ==
The Marching 101 maintains a fierce rivalry with Florida A&M University's Marching 100. In addition to competing on the field during the annual football meeting between the two schools, the Marching 101 and Marching 100 compete off the field as well holding their own Battle of the Bands competition versus each other. Other rivalries include the North Carolina A & T University "Blue & Gold Marching Machine."

== Band director lineage ==
- William H. Jackson, 1918–1924
- Fred Bugard Payton, 1924–1928
- Harold June (student), 1928–1931
- Earl Davis, 1931–1934
- Reginald Thomasson, 1934–1943, 1949–1976
- C. V. Troupe, 1943–1966
- Marcus Rowland, 1966–1967
- Clifford Watkins, 1967–1971
- Edmund B. Hughes, 1971–1973
- James Sochinski, 1973–1975
- Issac Richardson, 1975–1976
- Ronald J. Sarjeant, 1976–2004
- Eddie Ellis, 2004–2015
- John Robinson, 2015–2017
- Patrick Moore, 2018–2025
- J. William Nicholas, 2025– Present

== Primary repertoire ==
The Marching 101 primary repertoire includes the following:

- "Bulldog Fight Song"
- "Get Up for the Bulldogs", inspired by "Up for the Down Stroke" from Parliament (band)
- "Pass the Peas", a 1972 classic by The J.B.'s
- "South Carolina State University Alma Mater" (Alma Mater)

== Summer band camp ==
The Marching 101's School Summer Band Camp offers a one-week intensive camp where campers condition, practice, and perform like the Marching 101, putting on an exhibition performance at the end of the week.

== Community outreach ==
The South Carolina State University community believes involvement and community outreach is critical to the success of the university and the Marching 101. The outreach program provides two free lessons on a particular instrument from members of the 101 and the Bulldog community.
