= Boots on the Ground (803Fresh song) =

2024 song by 803Fresh

Single by 803Fresh
- Released: December 20, 2024
- Genre: Southern soul; dance
- Length: 3:24
- Label: Snake Eyez
- Songwriter: Douglas Furtick
- Producer: T Da Wizard

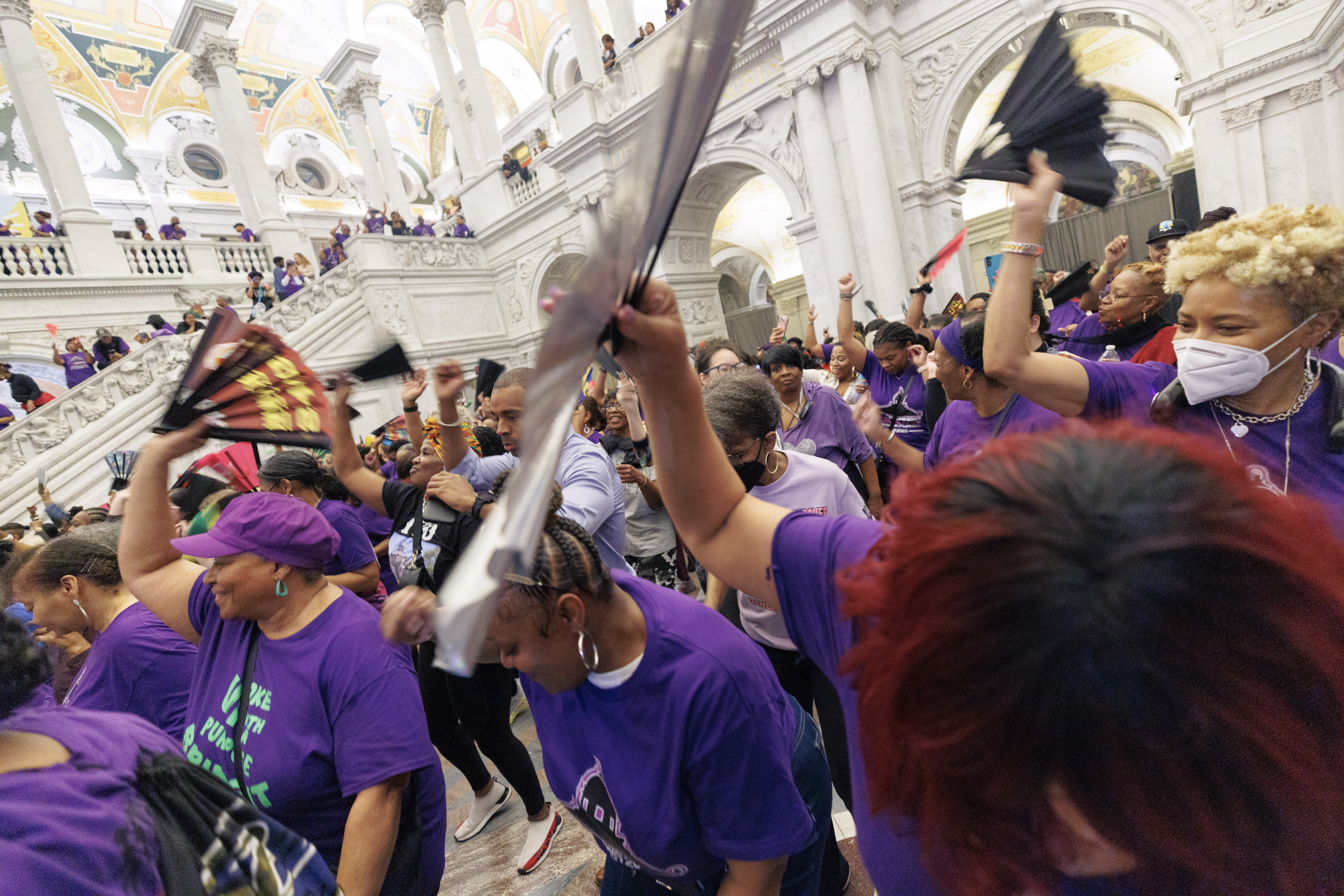
People with fans dancing to "Boots on the Ground" at a Library of Congress program documenting soul line dancing, February 27, 2025

"Boots on the Ground", also known as "Boots on the Ground: Where Them Fans At?" is a song written and performed by American singer Douglas Furtick, under the stage name 803Fresh.

The song is strongly associated with the "Boots on the Ground" soul line dance, with Jaterrious Trésean Little, aka Trè Little of Newnan, Georgia, credited with creating the dance steps. The popularity of the song was enhanced by a TikTok challenge.

The song was released on December 20, 2024 on the Snake Eyez Music Group label written by Douglas Furtick (803 Fresh) and produced by T Da Wizard.

== Charts & Participatory Culture ==
On the week of April 26, 2025, the song went to number 1 on the Billboard R&B Digital Song Sales chart and stayed number 1 for eight weeks. On June 4, the song rose to number 1 on the Billboard Adult R&B Airplay Chart.

The official music video, shot at South Carolina State University featuring their Marching 101 band, debuted May 15, 2025 on the Sherri Shepherd Show. As of April 24, 2026, the music video amassed over 27 million views. A video of the song posted on the 803Fresh YouTube channel had 15 million views.

Celebrities and public figures filmed performing the dance and/or clips to the viral song include dancers at the Library of Congress, the Atlanta, Georgia, police department, 2024 US presidential candidate and former Vice President Kamala Harris, former US first lady Michelle Obama, Good Morning America news anchor Robin Roberts, singer Beyoncé during the Cowboy Carter Tour in Los Angeles, a tent-raising with the UniverSoul Circus, and R&B singer Fantasia recorded the remix along with a music video. Numerous 2025 high school, college and other graduations ceremonies featured the line dance song. Award shows featured the song including the red carpet broadcast preceding the BET Awards 2025. Several major league basketball events featured 803 Fresh performing "Boots on the Ground" live including appearances at Game 1 of the 2025 NBA Finals in June of 2025 and at the Kevin Hart Fever Fest preceding the Indiana Fever WNBA All-Star event in July.

Cultural experts and journalists have identified several trends driving the internet dance craze behind the song—a love of community in Southern soul line dance tradition and the desire for connection during summer cookouts. Other contributing factors include resilience in a time of political uncertainty, shared dance culture of fan clacking, and the popularity of the "Boots on the Ground" dance and song as a summer sensation.

== Honors, awards and recognitions ==
On May 6, 2025, Hamilton R. Grant sponsored, along with other members of the South Carolina House of Representatives, a resolution honoring 803Fresh, and proclaiming May 6th "Boots on the Ground Day".

On May 22, 2025, 803Fresh received a Community Service Award from John P. Thomas school in Columbia, South Carolina.

On June 9, 2025, 803Fresh received a Billboard plaque recognizing the Boots on the Ground song achieving #1 on the Billboard Adult R&B Airplay chart.

One June 19, 2025, a Google Doodle image created for the holiday Juneteenth featured images of fans, of boots on the ground and of people performing a soul line dance.

On January 12, 2026, the song received two nominations for the 57th NAACP Image Awards: NAACP Image Award for Outstanding Music Video, and NAACP Image Award for Outstanding Duo or Group (for the version with Fantasia).

On February 24, 2026, the song received the NAACP Image Award for Outstanding Duo or Group (traditional).

== Charts ==
=== Weekly charts ===
Weekly chart performance for "Boots on the Ground"
Chart (2025)	Peak position
Jamaica Airplay (JAMMS)	2
US Bubbling Under Hot 100 (Billboard)	10
US Hot R&B/Hip-Hop Songs (Billboard)	20

=== Year-end charts ===
Year-end chart performance for "Boots on the Ground"
Chart (2025)	Position
US Hot R&B/Hip-Hop Songs (Billboard)	94

== See also ==
- Line dance
- Southern soul
