= Life Is Not a Fairy Tale =

Memoir and subsequent film about Fantasia Barrino

- Author: Fantasia Barrino
- Genre: Memoir
- Publication date: 2005

Life Is Not a Fairy Tale is a memoir by American singer Fantasia Barrino, describing her life prior to national prominence as winner of the third season of American Idol. The book was released by Atria Publishing Group, and adapted into a 2006 Lifetime television movie.

== Book ==
Fantasia recounts her rise from high-school dropout to music star in her autobiography, which became a New York Times bestseller. The book was dictated by Barrino and typed by a freelance writer, as Barrino was functionally illiterate, though she has since earned a GED and attended college.

As an American Idol contestant, Barrino came to national attention, winning the show's third season and launching a singing career. But her life began much more humbly. At the age of seventeen, Barrino was an uneducated, unmarried teenage mother living in poverty. She was faced with many tough battles growing up in the city of High Point, North Carolina. She shows respect and admiration to her mother and grandmother who raised her, both preachers who instilled in her a strong faith in God. Both women struggled with similar problems as Barrino faced, which inspired her to make changes in her life.

== Film ==
Life Is Not a Fairy Tale
- Written by: Keith Glover
- Directed by: Debbie Allen
- Starring: Fantasia Barrino; Viola Davis; Loretta Devine; Kadeem Hardison
- Music by: Rickey Minor
- Country of origin: United States
- Original language: English

Production
- Executive producers: Robert O. Green; Bill Haber
- Cinematography: John Simmons
- Editor: Lillian Benson
- Running time: 84 minutes
- Production companies: L.I.F.T. Production; Ostar Productions

Original release
- Network: Lifetime
- Release: August 19, 2006

Life Is Not A Fairy Tale: The Fantasia Barrino Story is a 2006 American biographical film directed by Debbie Allen, based on the life of American singer Fantasia Barrino, adapted from her book of the same name.

The movie begins with Barrino's early life in a religious family. Barrino faces problems with self-esteem, sexual abuse, teen pregnancy, and her faith as she fights to overcome her mistakes at a young age.

The movie premiered on August 19, 2006, with more than nineteen million viewers during the August 19–20 weekend, becoming Lifetime's second most-watched movie in its 22-year history. The movie was ranked the top cable movie premiere of the year among women ages 18–49.

=== Cast ===
- Fantasia Barrino as herself
  - Jamia Simone Nash as young Fantasia
- Viola Davis as Diane Barrino
- Kadeem Hardison as Joseph Barrino
- Loretta Devine as Addie Collins
- Thomas Tah Hyde III as Rico Barrino
  - Paul Amadi as young Rico
- Terrance Thomas as Teeny
- Deanna Dawn as Ruby
- Chico Benymon as Rodney Birks
- Norman Nixon Jr. as Dwayne
- Cedric Pendleton as Johnny Lee

=== Music ===
No soundtrack was released, but many songs appear throughout the film.

- "Chain of Fools" — Fantasia
- "Respect Yourself" — Viola Davis
- "Wade in the Water" — Viola Davis
- "The Lord is Blessing Me" — Viola Davis & Jamia Simone Nash
- "ABC" — Jamia Simone Nash, Paul Amadi, & Terrance Thomas
- "Almighty God" — Viola Davis
- "Pass Me Not" — Fantasia, Viola Davis, and Loretta Devine
- "Signed, Sealed, Delivered I'm Yours — Fantasia
- "Proud Mary — Fantasia
- "I Heard It Through the Grapevine" — Fantasia
- "Almighty God" — Viola Davis & Loretta Devine
- "Summertime — Fantasia
- "God Bless the Child" — Fantasia
- "I Wanna Hear You Say (Do You Love Me)" — Fantasia

== Accolades ==
Award	Year	Category	Nominee	Result
NAACP Image Awards	2007	Outstanding Television Movie, Mini-Series or Dramatic Special	Life Is Not a Fairytale	Nominated
NAACP Image Awards	2007	Outstanding Actress in a Television Movie, Mini-Series or Dramatic Special	Fantasia Barrino	Nominated
NAACP Image Awards	2007	Outstanding Actress in a Television Movie, Mini-Series or Dramatic Special	Loretta Devine	Nominated
NAACP Image Awards	2007	Outstanding Actor in a Television Movie, Mini-Series or Dramatic Special	Kadeem Hardison	Won
Teen Choice Awards	2007	Choice TV Movie	Life Is Not a Fairytale	Nominated
