= The Barrino Brothers =

American soul musical group

- Origin: High Point, North Carolina, United States
- Genre: Soul
- Years active: 1968
- Label: Invictus
- Members: Julius Barrino; Nathaniel Barrino; Perry Barrino; Robert Roseboro

The Barrino Brothers were an American soul music group formed in High Point, North Carolina, in the late 1960s. The group was composed of three brothers, Nathaniel, Perry and Julius Barrino, and a friend named Robert Roseboro.

== Career ==
In 1972, they signed a recording contract with the former Motown team of Holland-Dozier-Holland, who had their own imprint, Invictus Records. They subsequently began recording their debut album, entitled Livin' High Off the Goodness of Your Love. While still in production of the complete album, two of the songs were released regionally in the US: "I Shall Not Be Moved" and "Try It, You'll Like It". At that time, due to distributor and other matters beyond the group's control, these two releases failed to get sufficient airplay and their complete album was never released in the US. One other song, titled "Trapped In a Love", was released as the B-side to the Honey Cone song "Sunday Morning People". Later, in the 1970s, The Barrino Brothers' catalog was sold to music moguls in Japan.

The Barrino Brothers are uncles to R&B singers Fantasia and Ricco Barrino, the former of whom is an American Idol winner, while the latter is signed to Grand Hustle Records.

== Discography ==
=== Singles ===
45 1969 TCB X 100 A: Just A Mistake B: I'll Take My Flowers Right Now

1970 Invictus Is 9083 A: Trapped In A Love B: When Love Was A Child

1971 Invictus IS 9084 A: I Shall Not Be Moved B: When Love Was A Child

1971 Invictus IS 9104 A: I Had It All B: I Shall Not Be Moved

1972 Invictus Is 9121 A: Try It, You'll Like It B: I Had It All

1972 Invictus Is-9130 A: Livin' High Off The Goodness Of Your Love

B: Livin' High Off The Goodness Of Your Love (Instrumental)

1973 Invictus USA ZS7 1256 A: Born On The Wild

B: Born On The Wild (Instrumental)
