= Back to Me (Fantasia album) =

Studio album by Fantasia
- Released: August 24, 2010
- Genres: Pop; R&B
- Length: 47:20
- Labels: 19; S; J
- Producers: Stephen Bray; Chuck Harmony; Jim Jonsin; Los Da Mystro; Rico Love; Malay; Novel; Pop & Oak; Kawan "KP" Prather; Brenda Russell; The Stereotypes; Ryan "Rykeyz" Williamson; Allee Willis

Fantasia chronology
Fantasia (2006)	Back to Me (2010)	Side Effects of You (2013)

Singles from Back to Me
- 1. "Bittersweet" Released: May 11, 2010; 2. "I'm Doin' Me" Released: September 28, 2010; 3. "Collard Greens & Cornbread" Released: April 11, 2011

Back to Me is the third studio album by American singer Fantasia. It was released by 19 Recordings, S Records and J Records on August 24, 2010. Her first project in four years, much of the album was conceived after Fantasia had ventured into musical acting, starring as Celie in the Broadway musical The Color Purple, with production provided by Chuck Harmony, Jim Jonsin, Los Da Mystro, Pop & Oak and others. The album's title was suggested to her by comedian Steve Harvey, when Barrino visited his morning radio program.

The album earned largely positive reviews from music critics who declared it a strong comeback. Back to Me sold 117,000 in its first week, debuting at number two on the US Billboard 200 and at number one on the Billboard R&B/Hip-Hop Albums chart, becoming her highest-charting album by then. The album received a Best R&B Album nod at the Grammy Awards, while lead single "Bittersweet" won in the Best Female R&B Vocal Performance category. To promote the album, Barrino embarked on her first solo concert tour, Back to Me Tour in the fall of 2010.

== Background ==
Fantasia received two Grammy Award nominations for her self titled sophomore release (2006). In 2008, she began work on her then-untitled third studio album. In June 2008, Bruce Waynne and Kevin Risto from production duo Midi Mafia announced that they would produce the majority of the project. Also, duo Rock City and songwriter-producers Rich King, Eric Hudson and Raphael Saadiq became involved on the project. Fantasia confirmed that about 75 percent of the album was complete by mid-2009, and that fans should've expected a new single by the fall of 2009, with the album due to be released in early 2010.

This was later delayed, and while recording additional material, Fantasia decided to do a great deal of it the "old fashioned way," inviting a live orchestra to record in the studio with her. In addition, J Records recruited Claude Kelly to add a more contemporary, commercial sound to the album. In May 2010, the album was announced to be released on July 27, 2010. It was later again pushed back to August 10, 2010, and finally to August 24, 2010. To promote the album, Barrino embarked on her first solo concert tour, Back to Me Tour in the fall of 2010.

== Promotion ==
"Even Angels", produced by The Stereotypes and first performed on The Oprah Winfrey Show on February 3, 2010, was issued as the album's first single, though it was later demoted and replaced by "Bittersweet" as the album's leading single. "Bittersweet Bittersweet," released on May 11, 2010, and then performed the next day on American Idol, became Fantasia's third chart topper on the US Adult R&B Songs chart, It spent five weeks at number-one and also reached number seven on the Hot R&B/Hip-Hop Songs chart.

"I'm Doin' Me, produced by Chuck Harmony, was released as Back to Me's second single. It peaked at number 11 on the Hot R&B/Hip-Hop Songs chart. The song also reached the top three on the Adult R&B Songs chart. "Collard Greens & Cornbread," produced by Pop & Oak, served as the album's third single. Fantasia performed the song on American Idol's result night on March 31, 2011, and it was officially released as a radio single on April 11, 2011. It peaked at number nine on the Adult R&B Songs chart.

== Critical response ==
Professional ratings
Aggregate scores
Source	Rating
Metacritic	(70/100)
Review scores
Source	Rating
AllMusic	3.5/5 stars
Entertainment Weekly	B
Los Angeles Times	3/4 stars
New York Daily News	4/5 stars
Rolling Stone	3.5/5 stars
Slant Magazine	1.5/5 stars

Upon its release, Back to Me received generally positive reviews from most music critics. At Metacritic, which assigns a normalized rating out of 100 to reviews from mainstream critics, it has so far received an average score of 70 based on 7 reviews. Boston Globe critic Ken Capobianco declared the record "a strong comeback" and went on to say that "Fantasia has matured [and] appears to be an artist reborn." Jim Farber with The New York Daily News called it "a wail of a comeback". He found that it "outperforms the singer's first two works, with meatier hooks, firmer melodies, and a more shrewdly focused point of view." Mariel Concepcion, writing for Billboard, called it the project a "soulful, laid-back album with tinges of gospel" and noted that "her distinct voice is most enjoyable when singing heartfelt ballads."

Stephen Thomas Erlewine from AllMusic called Back to Me Fantasia's "most interesting album" which had her "reconnecting with her roots." He found that "everybody expands upon the cool stainless sheen of 2006's Fantasia, keeping the surfaces smooth and giving Barrino plenty of room to emote, smudging all the slickness with her throaty growl, grabbing attention even as the music drifts toward the generic." Exclaim!'s Matt Bauer described Back to Me as a "commercial, mainstream, admittedly slick album that doesn't suck. In fact, this is a pretty damn good album showcasing a more refined, yet vocally uninhibited, Barrino [...] Back to Me is a definite step forward." Los Angeles Times critic Margaret Wappler felt that "there is nothing here that hasn't been heard or seen before, but it's done with integrity and focus [...] At 26, she sounds like she's learning what to let go of and what to keep, a long journey to be sure; on Back to Me, she sounds up for the task."

SoulTracks editor Melody Charles called the album "a good place for her to dwell and, for the fans, an authentic, if not exciting, journey to endeavor." Mikael Wood with Entertainment Weekly gave it a "B" rating, commenting "Fantasia's rough-hewn vocals shine best on "The Thrill Is Gone." Michaelangelo Matos from Rolling Stone found that the "revelations are few on Back to Me and noted that "on her third album, she's more contained as a singer than the Idol norm, which fits the modestly scaled material." Melanie Sims from Associated Press felt that while Fanastia "shows off her bellowing, raspy vocals on the latest album, [...] the singer reveals nothing of herself. She wastes her golden vocals on tin-can pop songs." In his review for Slant Magazine Jonathan Keefe stated "the material [Fantasia] has been saddled with has been extraordinarily awful" but still described her positively as an "uninhibited, intuitive soul singer with a truly distinctive sense of phrasing and boundless passion".

=== Accolades ===
The album received a Grammy Award nomination for Best R&B Album. It marked Fantasia's third consecutive album to receive a nomination in the Best R&B Album or Best Contemporary R&B Album category.

== Commercial performance ==
Back to Me sold 117,000 copies in its debut week, earning Barrino a number two debut on the US Billboard 200 chart. The album also topped the Top R&B/Hip-Hop Albums chart, becoming Fantasia's first album to do so. By April 2013, it had sold 490,000 copies in the United States.

== Track listing ==
Back to Me track listing
No.	Title	Writer(s)	Producer(s)	Length
1.	"I'm Doin' Me"	Charles Harmon; Claude Kelly	Chuck Harmony	3:56
2.	"Bittersweet"	Harmon; Kelly	Harmony	3:58
3.	"Man of the House"	Shaffer Smith; Ryan Williamson	Rykeyz; Ne-Yo^{[a]}	3:20
4.	"Who's Been Lovin' You?"	Carlos McKinney; Rico Love	Los Da Mystro	3:38
5.	"Collard Greens & Cornbread"	Warren Felder; Andrew Wansel; Tiwa Savage; Nickolas Ashford; Valerie Simpson	Pop & Oak	3:52
6.	"Teach Me"	Fantasia Barrino; James Ho; Kawan Prather; Jessyca Wilson	Malay; KP	4:12
7.	"Move on Me"	Barrino; Ho; Prather; Wilson	Malay; KP	4:08
8.	"Trust Him"	Alonzo Mario Steveson; Tiffany Villarreal; Tony Reyes; Herbert Rooney	Tony Reyes; Novel	3:12
9.	"The Thrill Is Gone" (featuring CeeLo Green)	Ho; Prather; Wilson; Thomas Callaway; Burt Bacharach; Hal David	Malay; KP	3:38
10.	"Falling in Love Tonight"	Love; James Scheffer; Daniel Morris	Jim Jonsin; Love	3:58
11.	"Even Angels"	Jeremy Reeves; Ray Romulus; Jonathan Yip; Heather Bright	The Stereotypes	3:52
12.	"I'm Here" (from The Color Purple musical)	Brenda Russell; Allee Willis; Stephen Bray	Russell; Willis; Bray	5:28
Total length:				45:59

Japan bonus track
No.	Title	Writer(s)	Producer(s)	Length
13.	"The Worst Part Is Over"	Kelly; Felder	Oak	3:15

Notes

- ^{^[a]} signifies co-producer

Sample credits

- "Collard Greens & Cornbread" contains a sample from "Your Precious Love", performed by Marvin Gaye and Tammi Terrell.
- "Move on Me" was previously recorded by girl group RichGirl in 2008 but never officially released.
- "Trust Him" contains a sample from "Synthetic Substitution", performed by Melvin Bliss.
- "The Thrill Is Gone" contains a sample from "The Look of Love", performed by Isaac Hayes.

== Personnel ==
- Chris Athens – mastering
- Warren Luening, Larry Hall, Rick Baptist – trumpet
- Yelena Yergorian, Josefina Vergara, Tammy Hatwan, Julie Rogers, Katia Popov, Searmi Park, Alyssa Park, Sid Page, Natalie Leggett, Neel Hammond, Henry Gronnier, Caroline Campbell, Charlie Bisharat – violin
- Derek Blanks – photography
- Jesse Bond, James Harrah – guitar
- Stephen Bray, Brenda Russell, Allee Willis – producer
- Tanisha Broadwater, Donnie Meadows, Kimberly L. Smith, David "Touch" Wright – production coordination
- Robert Brophy, Brian Dembow, Thomas Diener, Alma Fernandez – viola
- Ndugu Chancler – drums
- Benjamin Chang, Jaymz Hardy-Martin III, Mike "TrakGuru" Johnson, Scott Naughton – engineer
- Giovanna Clayton, Steve Erdody, Vanessa Freebairn-Smith, Tim Loo – celli
- Los DaMystro – conductor, producer
- Bruce Dukov – concertmaster, violin
- Warren Felder, Fantasia, Claude Kelly, Tiffany Villarreal, Andrew Wansel – backing vocals
- Frank Filipetti, Carlton Lynn, Robert – engineer, mixing
- Ashanti "The Mad Violinist" Floyd – cello, viola, violin
- Moses Gallart, Jesus Garnica, Chad Jolley, Giancarlo Lino, Conrad Martin, Aaron Walk, Jason Wilkie – assistant
- Erwin Gorostiza – creative director
- Chuck Harmony – bass, drums, guitar, producer, vocal producer
- Dan Higgins, Greg Huckins, Joel Peskin – clarinet
- Alex Iles, Bill Reichenbach Jr., Reggie Young – trombone
- Jaycen Joshua – mixing
- Alphonso Johnson – bass
- Jim Jonsin – keyboards, producer, programming
- Joseph Joubert – arranger, conductor
- Rico Love – producer, vocal producer
- Graham Marsh – engineer, vocal engineer
- Deaundra Metzger – hair stylist
- Joe Mitchell – percussion
- Danny Morris – keyboards
- Keith Naftaly – A&R
- Ne-Yo – producer, backing vocals
- Greg Phillinganes – organ, synthesizer
- Tony Reyes – bass, guitar
- Victor Simonson – piano
- Lucky Smyler – make-up
- The Stereotypes – engineer, producer
- Denise Trotman – art direction, design
- Julian Vasquez – vocal engineer
- Pamela Watson – stylist
- Gina Zimmitti – contractor

== Charts ==
=== Weekly charts ===
Weekly chart performance for Back to Me
Chart (2010)	Peak position
US Billboard 200	2
US Top R&B/Hip-Hop Albums (Billboard)	1

=== Year-end charts ===
2010 year-end chart performance for Back to Me
Chart (2010)	Position
US Billboard 200	105
US Top R&B/Hip-Hop Albums (Billboard)	30

2011 year-end chart performance for Back to Me
Chart (2010)	Position
US Top R&B/Hip-Hop Albums (Billboard)	51

== Release history ==
Release dates and formats for Back to Me
Region	Date	Format(s)	Label(s)	Ref.
United States	August 24, 2010	CD; digital download	J; 19	
