= Without Me (Fantasia song) =

Single by Fantasia featuring Kelly Rowland and Missy Elliott

from the album Side Effects of You
- Released: April 17, 2013
- Recorded: 2012–2013
- Genre: R&B; hip hop
- Length: 4:30
- Label: RCA
- Songwriters: Fantasia Barrino; Harmony Samuels; Al Sherrod Lambert; Melissa Elliott; Kyle Stewart
- Producer: Harmony Samuels

Fantasia singles chronology
"Lose to Win" (2013)	"Without Me" (2013)	"If We Had Your Eyes" (2013)

Kelly Rowland singles chronology
"Kisses Down Low" (2013)	"Without Me" (2013)	"One Life" (2013)

Missy Elliott singles chronology
"How Ya Doin'?" (2013)	"Without Me" (2013)	"I Deserve It" (2014)

Music video
- "Without Me" on YouTube

"Without Me" is a song by American recording artist Fantasia featuring Kelly Rowland and Missy Elliott. It serves as the second single from Fantasia's fourth studio album, Side Effects of You (2013). The song premiered on Fantasia's official Vevo account on April 17, 2013.

== Background ==
On April 19, 2013, during a backstage interview at American Idol, Fantasia revealed that the next single from Side Effects of You would be the song, "Without Me." Fantasia's inspiration for the song originally came from a heated argument she had with someone over the phone late at night in the studio. After the phone conversation, Fantasia walked back into the studio and requested Harmony Samuels to give her something "hood."

When asked on what "sparked her outrage", Fantasia replied, "Exactly what I said in the song. 'You stuntin'! Everything you doing, I put you on to that!' So, you stuntin’, where would you be without me. Go ahead and get your shine time now, but it's going to die soon because there is no talent. You are just stuntin’ because of me." When collaborations for the song were suggested, Fantasia immediately thought of Missy Elliott because the two were friends and knew Missy would "lyrically kill" the verse.

== Music video ==
=== Production ===
Though in earlier reports Fantasia requested Missy Elliott to direct the video, Steven Gomillion and Dennis Leupold took on the role of directing. Fantasia expressed her praise for the directors via Twitter, tweeting: "Thank you Steven and Dennis for bringing my vision to life... It is everything I pictured in my head." Kelly Rowland also praised the directors, stating to Access Hollywood that, "The directors captured Fantasia and myself in a video style that we've never done before."

On July 1, 2013, the music video for the single premiered on VEVO and BET's 106 & Park.

=== Synopsis ===
The music video shows several different scenes and cuts back and forth in between them. One scene shows Fantasia portraying an executive seated at a table with two men in suits who appear to be enjoying a luxurious lifestyle. Other scenes show Fantasia, Missy, and Kelly Rowland performing the lyrics of the song and dancing in neon-lit nightclubs and in grungy alleys. Kelly Rowland and Missy Elliott appear in the video, dancing and performing their lyrics. Certain lyrics of the song are displayed in neon lights shone along the front window of a luxury car.

== Chart performance ==
On the week of May 1, 2013, "Without Me" became the most added single on Adult Urban Mainstream Airplay.

== Charts ==
=== Weekly charts ===
Chart (2013)	Peak position
US Billboard Hot 100	74
US Hot R&B/Hip-Hop Songs (Billboard)	26

=== Year-end charts ===
Chart (2013)	Position
US Hot R&B/Hip-Hop Songs (Billboard)	83
