= Lose to Win =

Single by Fantasia

from the album Side Effects of You
- Released: January 8, 2013
- Recorded: 2012
- Genre: R&B
- Length: 3:54
- Label: RCA
- Songwriters: Andrea Martin; Harmony Samuels; Franne Golde; Dennis Lambert; Walter Orange
- Producer: Harmony Samuels

Fantasia singles chronology
"Collard Greens & Cornbread" (2011)	"Lose to Win" (2013)	"Without Me" (2013)

"Lose to Win" is a song by American recording artist Fantasia. It was released as the lead single from her fourth studio album, Side Effects of You on January 8, 2013. "Lose to Win" is Fantasia's first release through RCA Records following the closure of J Records, after a reorganization at Sony Music Entertainment.

== Background and release ==
"Lose to Win" is the lead single from Fantasia's fourth studio album, Side Effects of You, which was released in April 2013. It is a mid-tempo R&B song that samples the Commodores' 1985 single, "Nightshift". Critics noted that its lyrical content is about the controversy surrounding Fantasia's relationship with Antwaun Cook. The song premiered on Fantasia's YouTube channel on December 19, 2012 and was her first release under the RCA Records brand following RCA Music Group's disbanding of her previous label J Records in 2011.

== Music video ==
The music video that accompanies the new hit song "Lose to Win" was released on March 4, 2013 on vevo.com. Filming for the video took place in Los Angeles and was directed by Steven Gomillion and Dennis Leupold. In the 1920s inspired video, Fantasia sits in her bed room as a projector shows images of her once happy relationship on the wall in front of her and she reflects on how the relationship has gone bad. Her man is shown flirting with other women and verbally abusing her, while the screen shows flash backs of happier times in the couple's relationship. Then her man sits and reflects in how he has treated his love and now that he wants her back, she found the strength to leave him.

== Live performances ==
Fantasia performed the single on the twelfth season of American Idol on April 18, 2013. The performance was described as "dynamic, passionate and powerful" by the show's judges, and received an ovation from the audience. On April 24, 2013 she performed the single on "Good Morning America" on a promotional tour for the album Side Effects of You.

== Charts ==
Chart (2013)	Peak position
South Korea International (Gaon)	76
US Bubbling Under Hot 100 (Billboard)	2
US Hot R&B/Hip-Hop Songs (Billboard)	38

== Release history ==
List of release dates, showing region, release format, and label
Region	Date	Format	Label
United States	December 19, 2012	Broadcast premiere	RCA Records
United States	January 8, 2013	Digital download	RCA Records
