= When I See U =

Single by Fantasia

from the album Fantasia
- Released: April 17, 2007
- Genre: R&B
- Length: 3:37
- Label: J
- Songwriters: Louis Biancaniello; Waynne Nugent; Erika Nuri; Kevin Risto; Janet Sewell; Sam Watters
- Producers: Midi Mafia; Mzmeriq

Fantasia singles chronology
"Hood Boy" (2006)	"When I See U" (2007)	"Only One U" (2007)

Music video
- "When I See U" on YouTube

"When I See U" is a song recorded by American singer Fantasia for her self-titled second studio album (2006). It written by Louis Biancaniello, Waynne Nugent, Erika Nuri, Kevin Risto, Janet Sewell, Sam Watters, and produced by Midi Mafia along with Mzmeriq. An R&B ballad, it was released to positive reviews by critics as the album's second single in April 2007. Its digital release spawned several remixes, three of which featured rappers Remy Ma, Young Jeezy, Lumidee, B.G. and Polow da Don.

Upon release, it reached number one on the US Billboard Hot R&B/Hip-Hop Songs chart, and spent a year on the chart, one of only fourteen songs in history to achieve that feat. It was eventually ranked eighth on the chart's decade-end ranking. In December 2007, "When I See U" earned two Grammy Award nominations for Best Female R&B Vocal Performance and Best R&B Song. It lost in both categories to Alicia Keys' "No One" at the 50th Grammy Awards ceremony.

== Chart performance ==
"When I See U" debuted at number ninety-nine on the Billboard Hot 100 in April 2007. It was Fantasia's first to enter the chart since "Free Yourself" in 2005. The song peaked at number thirty-two on the chart, becoming more successful than Fantasia's first single, "Hood Boy", which failed to chart. It also reached number one for nine weeks on Billboard's Hot R&B/Hip-Hop Songs chart. "When I See U" was Fantasia's first single to reach the top ten on the chart since "Free Yourself" in 2005, and her first single to top the chart. The song spent 58 weeks on the Hot R&B/Hip-Hop chart, the 13th longest running song in the chart's history. It is also credited with re-energizing sales of Fantasia, causing the album to re-enter the top 100 of the Billboard 200 chart.

In September 2007, "When I See U" hit number one on the Billboard Hot 100 Recurrent Airplay chart, making it Fantasia's fifth chart topping recurrent hit on the Hot 100 section (single and airplay). It was announced in December 2009 by Billboard magazine that "When I See U" was the eighth biggest hit of the decade on the Hot R&B/Hip-Hop Songs chart.

== Music video ==
The video was shot by director Lenny Bass on March 26, 2007. It premiered on BET's Access Granted April 25, 2007 and on Yahoo! Music on April 26. The music video debuted on BET's top ten video countdown show 106 & Park on May 9.

The video begins with Fantasia singing on a rooftop, with scenes of her taking a bath in a tub interceding. After that, she walks to meet her love interest (NFL running back, Larry Johnson, who at the time played for the Kansas City Chiefs). At the end of the music video, she finally meets him and they embrace and, eventually, kiss. The video fades out on a shot of the stars and moon. Throughout the video, people in love are shown, ranging from children in their "puppy love" stages to elderly couples who have been married a long time.

== Charts ==
=== Weekly charts ===
Chart (2007)	Peak position
New Zealand Airplay (RMNZ)	91
US Billboard Hot 100	32
US Hot R&B/Hip-Hop Songs (Billboard)	1

=== Year-end charts ===
Chart (2007)	Position
US Hot R&B/Hip-Hop Songs (Billboard)	2
Chart (2008)	Position
US Hot R&B/Hip-Hop Songs (Billboard)	74

== Certifications ==
Region	Certification	Certified units/sales
New Zealand (RMNZ)	2× Platinum	60,000^{‡}
United Kingdom (BPI)	Platinum	600,000^{‡}
United States (RIAA) Mastertone	Gold	500,000^{*}
^{*} Sales figures based on certification alone.^{‡} Sales+streaming figures based on certification alone.

== See also ==
- List of number-one R&B singles of 2007 (U.S.)
