= Fantasia (singer) =

American R&B singer (born 1984)

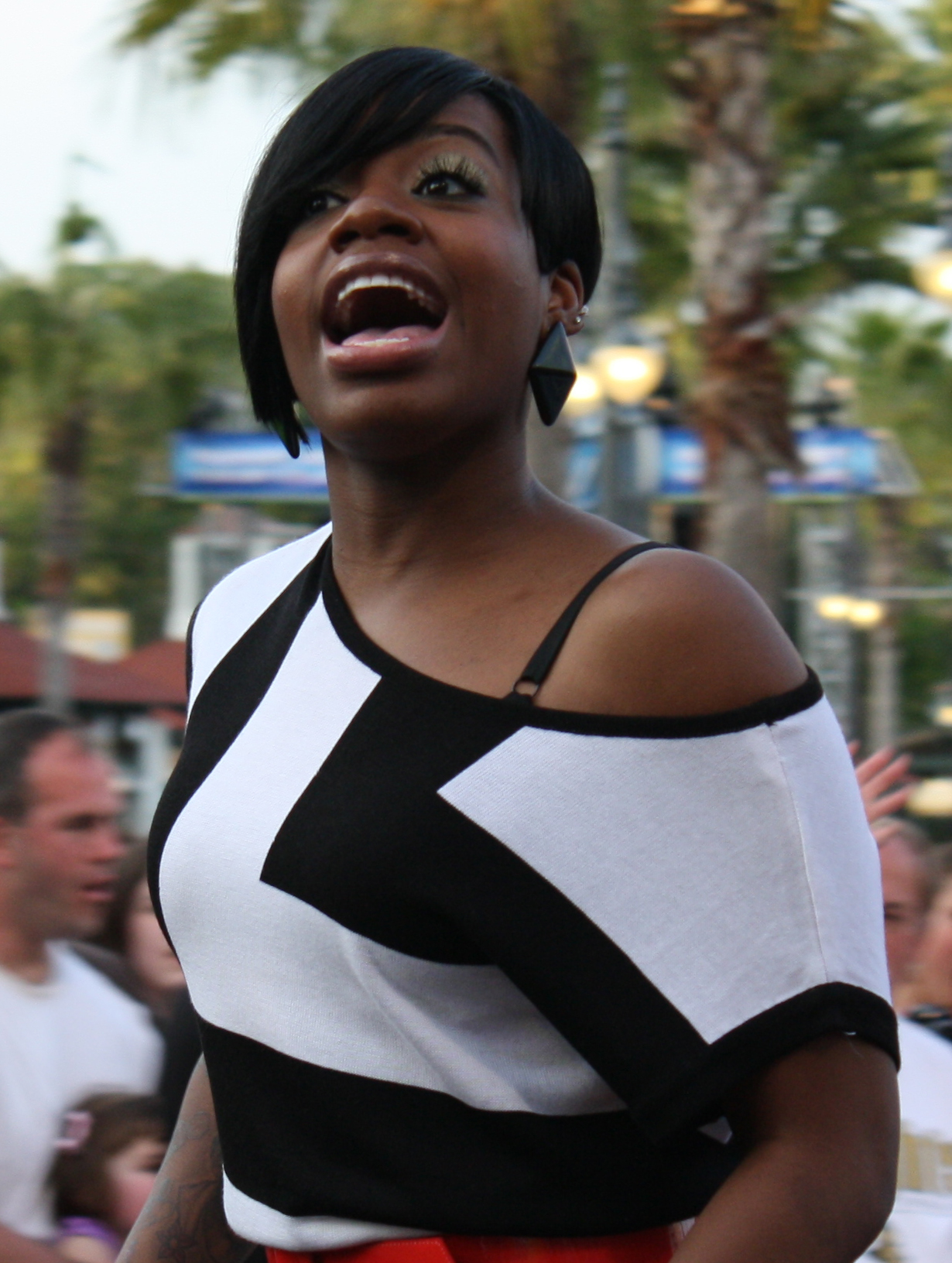
- Barrino in The American Idol Experience motorcade at Walt Disney World in 2009
- Born: Fantasia Monique Barrino; June 30, 1984 (age 42); High Point, North Carolina, U.S.
- Occupations: Singer; actress
- Years active: 2004–present
- Spouse: Kendall Taylor (m. 2015)
- Children: 3
- Relatives: Ricco Barrino (brother); K-Ci & JoJo (cousins); The Barrino Brothers (uncles)
- Awards: Full list
- Musical career
- Genres: R&B; pop; hip-hop soul; gospel
- Instrument: Vocals
- Labels: J; 19; RCA; Concord; Rock Soul Inc.

Fantasia Monique Barrino-Taylor (born June 30, 1984), also known mononymously as Fantasia, is an American singer and actress. She rose to prominence in 2004 with her performance of the Porgy and Bess standard "Summertime" during the third season of American Idol, becoming that season's winner. Following her victory, Barrino became the second artist after Lauryn Hill to have their first commercial single debut atop the Billboard Hot 100 with her 2004 song, "I Believe". It went on to become the best-selling single in the United States that year.

Barrino's debut album, Free Yourself (2004), received platinum certification by the Recording Industry Association of America (RIAA) and was nominated in three categories at the 48th Annual Grammy Awards. Her eponymous second album (2006) spawned the single "When I See U", which peaked within the Billboard Hot 100's top 40. Her third and fourth albums, Back to Me (2010) and Side Effects of You (2013), both peaked at number two on the Billboard 200, and topped the Top R&B/Hip-Hop Albums chart.

Barrino released her New York Times best-selling autobiography Life Is Not a Fairy Tale (2005), which was adapted into a 2006 television film that she starred in. She portrayed Celie Johnson in the Broadway musical The Color Purple from 2007 to 2008, which earned her a Theatre World Award for Best Debut Performance. She reprised her role in the 2023 film adaptation, for which she earned nominations for a Golden Globe Award and BAFTA Award for Best Actress and won an NAACP Image Award for Outstanding Lead Actress in a Motion Picture. In 2026, she led the Tyler Perry holiday film The Gospel of Christmas for Netflix.

She has earned over a dozen top ten hits on the Adult R&B Airplay chart. Billboard ranked her one of the Best R&B Singers of All Time, and named her among the top female artists of the 21st century. Her accolades include two Billboard Music Awards and a Grammy Award for Best Female R&B Vocal Performance for her single "Bittersweet". She was also selected to receive a star on the Hollywood Walk of Fame. In 2024, Time named her one of the 100 most influential people.

== Early life and education ==
Barrino was born to Diane and Joseph Barrino and raised in High Point, North Carolina. She began singing at the age of five. R&B duo K-Ci & JoJo are her first cousins. Her uncles, The Barrino Brothers, were a 1970s R&B band.

She attended Andrews High School in High Point, North Carolina. Feeling embarrassed and harassed after she was raped by a classmate, she dropped out of high school. She became pregnant at 16, and on August 8, 2001, she gave birth to a daughter with her ex-boyfriend Brandel Shouse.

== Career ==
=== 2004–2005: American Idol and Free Yourself ===
Barrino's show was a staging of the Porgy and Bess standard "Summertime" that left her in tears from "feeling the song" and earned praise from the judges and was named amongst the AOL's 2004 list of greatest television moments.

For the final performance of the season, Barrino offered a second performance of "Summertime" that again drew praise from the judges; Simon Cowell remarked that she was the best contestant to ever compete in any competition, including the more than seventy Idol champions crowned nationally and internationally since the show began its first global incarnations. On the finale, over 65 million votes were cast to determine the winner on May 26, 2004, up from 24 million in 2003. Barrino defeated runner-up Diana DeGarmo by 1.3 million votes. At age 19, she was the youngest American Idol winner until May 23, 2007, when then 17-year-old Jordin Sparks won the title.

Barrino participated in the U.S. tour with the other American Idol finalists, and appeared in the 2004 Christmas special, Kelly, Ruben and Fantasia: Home for the Holidays as well.

Barrino's brother auditioned for the eighth season of American Idol but failed to make it to the Hollywood round.

==== Performances ====
Week	Theme	Song	Artist	Order sung	Status
Semi-finals	Semi-final Group 1	"Something to Talk About"	Bonnie Raitt	8	Advanced
Top 12	Soul music Week	"Signed, Sealed, Delivered I'm Yours"	Stevie Wonder	6	Safe
Top 11	Country music Week	"Always on My Mind"	Willie Nelson	3	Safe
Top 10	Motown Week	"I Heard It Through the Grapevine"	Marvin Gaye	9	Safe
Top 9	Elton John	"Something About the Way You Look Tonight"	Elton John	1	Safe
Top 8	Soundtrack Cinema	"Summertime"	Abbie Mitchell	5	Safe
Top 7	Barry Manilow	"It's a Miracle"	Barry Manilow	7	Bottom 2
Top 6	Gloria Estefan	"Get on Your Feet"	Gloria Estefan	1	Safe
Top 5	Big Band	"Crazy Little Thing Called Love" "What Are You Doing the Rest of Your Life?"	Queen; Barbra Streisand	5; 10	Safe
Top 4	Disco	"Knock on Wood" "Holding Out for a Hero"	Eddie Floyd; Bonnie Tyler	3; 7	Bottom 2^{1}
Top 3	Idol's Choice; Judges' Choice; Clive Davis's Choice	"Chain of Fools" "A Fool in Love" "Greatest Love of All"	Aretha Franklin; Ike & Tina Turner; George Benson	2; 4; 6	Safe
Finale	Contestant's Choice	"All My Life" "Summertime" "I Believe"	K-Ci & JoJo; Abbie Mitchell; Fantasia (Idol Single)	2; 4; 6	Winner

- ^Note 1: When Ryan Seacrest announced the results in the particular night, Barrino was in the bottom two, but declared safe when LaToya London was eliminated.

After winning American Idol, Barrino signed to J Records with 19 Entertainment and began work on her debut album. In June 2004, she released her debut single, "I Believe", which later debuted at number one on the Billboard Hot 100. This number-one debut made Barrino the first artist in history to achieve this with a first single. On the sales chart, the single spent eleven consecutive weeks at number one, giving it the longest consecutive stay on top of that chart for an American Idol contestant. The CD single, "I Believe", went on to become the top selling single of 2004 in the U.S., and has since been certified double platinum by the CRIA. She also won three Billboard Music Awards for the single.

Barrino released her debut studio album, Free Yourself, in November 2004. It debuted at number eight on the Billboard 200, selling 240,000 copies in its first week. To date, it has sold over two million copies worldwide, and was certified Platinum in the U.S. The singles "Truth Is" and "Free Yourself" became R&B hits, reaching number two and number three respectively on the Billboard Hot R&B/Hip-Hop Songs, while the controversial "Baby Mama"—which critics accused of romanticizing single motherhood—reached the top twenty. Barrino did even better on the Billboard Hot Adult R&B Airplay, where she was the first artist of any kind to simultaneously hold the top two spots of the top three, and "Truth Is" spent 14 weeks at the number one position. Barrino was named the number-one artist of the Adult Urban Contemporary format for 2005 according to the December 13, 2005, issue of Billboard magazine.

Through the spring and winter of 2005, Barrino made many television appearances to promote her album. She played Aretha Franklin in an episode of the series American Dreams, singing "Respect"; guest voiced on The Simpsons episode "A Star Is Torn"; and guest starred as herself in a cameo role on the sitcom All of Us. She appeared three times as a musical guest on The Tonight Show with Jay Leno. On March 25, 2005, Barrino performed at the thirty-sixth NAACP Image Awards in honor of Illinois Senator Barack Obama after winning the award for Outstanding Female Artist. In May 2005, Barrino went on her first tour with her own live band, with soul singers Kem and Rashaan Patterson. She also appeared as a headliner at several music festivals including the Saint Lucia Jazz Festival and the Reggae Sumfest in Jamaica. In October 2005, she received good notices as an opening act for Kanye West's Touch the Sky Tour.

=== 2006–2007: Fantasia, acting debut and Broadway ===
In 2006, Barrino was nominated for three Grammy Awards for her debut album. Though she did not win any awards, she performed at the 48th annual telecast with several artists including Aerosmith, Joss Stone, John Legend, Maroon 5, and Ciara in an all-star tribute to Sly and the Family Stone during the Grammy Award show. In August 2006, Barrino played herself in a Lifetime Television film based on her autobiography Life Is Not a Fairy Tale. The film was directed by Debbie Allen and debuted on August 19, 2006. The movie received nineteen million viewers throughout its debut weekend. The Fantasia Barrino Story: Life is Not a Fairy Tale has also become the network's second most viewed program of all time. In 2006, Barrino released her second album Fantasia, that featured the single "When I See U", which topped the Billboard Hot R&B/Hip-Hop Songs chart for eight weeks.

Barrino had many musical collaborations during the fall of 2006 including a remake of The Clark Sisters' "Endow Me" which featured Faith Evans, Lil' Mo, and Coko of SWV; a remake of Stevie Wonder's 1976 song "I Wish" with Patti LaBelle and Yolanda Adams for the soundtrack to the 2006 animated film Happy Feet; and most notably her duet with Aretha Franklin "Put You Up on Game", which was recorded at that time and later released in 2007.

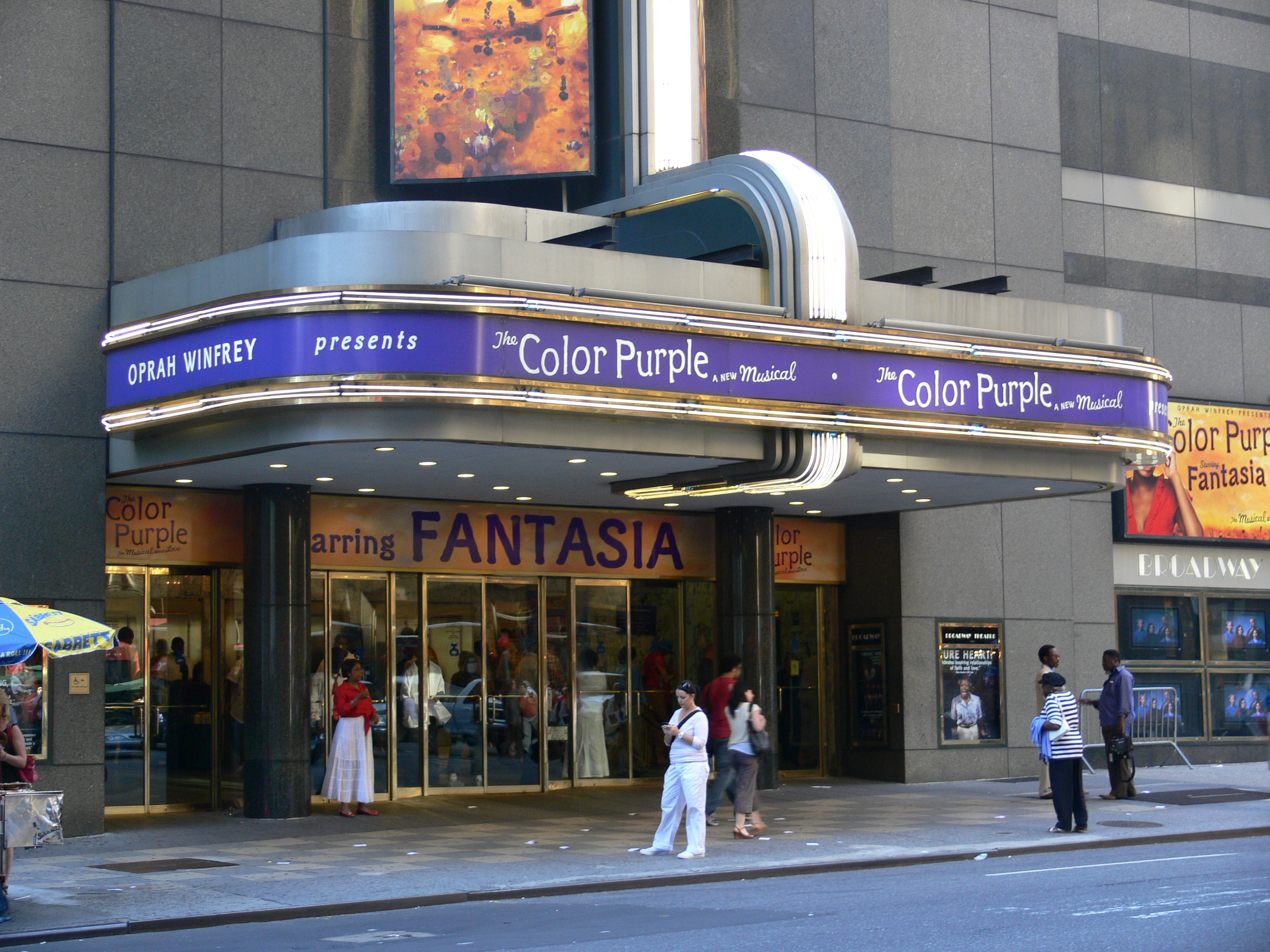
The Color Purple Broadway musical marquee in 2007

She released her self-titled second effort, Fantasia, on December 12, 2006. The album involved production by Missy Elliott, Swizz Beatz, Babyface, Diane Warren, and others, and has since spawned the singles "Hood Boy" produced by Tone Mason, "When I See U", and "Only One U" and went on to be certified gold. "When I See U" became her first single to top the Hot R&B/Hip-Hop Songs chart, remaining at the number one spot for eight consecutive weeks. The single stayed on the chart for over a year and was named number eight on the Billboard Best of The 2000s R&B/Hip-Hop Songs.

In February 2007, Barrino appeared and performed on American Idol, and announced that she would be taking over the role of Celie from LaChanze who originated the role in the Broadway musical The Color Purple, based on the Pulitzer Prize-winning 1982 novel of the same name by Alice Walker. After appearing on American Idol and The Oprah Winfrey Show, the musical received a boost of over two million in pre-ticket sales in one week. Leading up to her first performance on April 10, 2007, the play garnered a total of 6.5 million in pre-ticket sales. Barrino performed at the 2007 Tony Awards in a tribute to Atlanta's Alliance Theater in which The Color Purple got its start. Barrino was given the Theatre World Award and the Best Replacement Star Broadway.com Award. Barrino was initially scheduled for a limited six-month engagement ending in October 2007 but had her run extended until January 6, 2008. The Color Purple box office saw a thirty-four-million-dollar jump in sales since Barrino started in the show, a third of the play's 100 million dollar earning since its debut in 2005. In the September 2008 issue of Sister 2 Sister magazine, Barrino revealed that the reason for her absences in The Color Purple was because of the development of a cyst on her vocal cords. She was ordered to immediately undergo surgery which later revealed that she in fact had a tumor on her vocal cords. She now reports that after a successful surgery, the tumor was completely removed and she is now well. For her role she earned a Theatre World Award for Best Debut Performance.

=== 2008–2010: Back to Me and Fantasia for Real ===
Barrino received two Grammy nominations for her sophomore release, Fantasia and subsequently began work on her third studio album in 2008. She stated on the red carpet of the 2008 Grammy Awards that the style of the new album would be a blending of the avenues she has touched musically, which include American Idol and Broadway. She also revealed that she would be writing some of the album's songs and would collaborate again with Missy Elliott, The Underdogs, and Midi Mafia, who produced one of her biggest hits, "When I See U".

Midi Mafia produced the majority of Barrino's third studio album. Also, hip hop duo Rock City were confirmed to be writing for the new project. At the time, they had recorded four songs together. She also worked with songwriter-producer Rich King which spawned two songs for her third release. KP, Eric Hudson and Raphael Saadiq are a few people that also became involved on the project. Barrino confirmed that about 75 percent of the album was complete by mid-2009, and that fans should've expected a new single by the fall of 2009, with the album due to be released in early 2010. This was later delayed, and while recording her new album, Barrino decided to do a great deal of it the "old fashioned way", inviting a live orchestra to record in the studio with her.

In June 2008, Barrino parted ways with 19 Entertainment, but remained with 19 Recordings and J Records. She said that after the release of her third album, she plans to release a gospel album. She performed with her mother, Diane Barrino, in a Thanksgiving special on BET's Bobby Jones Gospel. Barrino also appeared on Jennifer Hudson's self-titled album, on the song "I'm His Only Woman", which was nominated for a 2009 Grammy Award, though it did not win. Barrino reprised the role of Celie in the national tour of The Color Purple during its Washington D.C., Chicago, Atlanta, and Los Angeles stops.

Barrino also stars in a reality show produced by World of Wonder. Titled Fantasia for Real, it premiered on January 11, 2010, on VH1 to rave reviews and ratings. The show's first season ended in July 2010 with its second began on September 19, 2010. "Even Angels", a song from Barrino's third studio album, produced by The Stereotypes and written by Heather Bright, was never released to radio . She performed the song on The Oprah Winfrey Show on February 3, 2010. The album's first official single, "Bittersweet", was released on May 11, 2010, and has gone on to reach number seven on the Hot R&B/Hip-Hop Songs chart as well as number seventy-four on the Billboard Hot 100.

Barrino's third studio album, Back to Me, was released on August 24, 2010. Barrino cited Tina Turner, Queen and Aretha Franklin as influences, and like musicians she admired from their era, she recorded with a live band. The album has been promoted by appearances on Good Morning America and The Wendy Williams Show among others. On March 28, 2010, Barrino also performed "America the Beautiful" at WWE WrestleMania XXVI. To promote the album, Barrino embarked on her first solo concert tour, Back to Me Tour in the fall of 2010. Barrino appeared on the track "I Want to Be Your Man" from Charlie Wilson's album Just Charlie. In the summer of 2010, she appeared as a guest judge alongside Wayne Brady, on episode 11 of RuPaul's Drag Race.

=== 2011–2016: Side Effects of You and The Definition Of ===
On February 13, 2011, Barrino won her first Grammy Award for Best Female R&B Vocal Performance for "Bittersweet". In 2011, Barrino was cast in her first film role, playing gospel singer Mahalia Jackson in a biographical film based on the 1993 book Got to Tell It: Mahalia Jackson, Queen of Gospel. It was later reported that the film was fully endorsed by the Mahalia Jackson estate. Barrino also would receive not only the top salary in the project but a percentage of the box office revenue the film creates. Production was originally planned to begin in October 2011 in New Orleans and Chicago with a release date of late 2012 and a premiere at the Cannes Film Festival. In August 2011, organizers of the International Hair Show in Atlanta, Georgia, said medical conditions requiring bed rest had forced Barrino to cancel her scheduled performance there. After reports were released suggesting that Barrino would not be involved with the film, Double Dutch Productions LLC, the production company behind Mahalia!, released a statement saying it "extends apologies to Barrino for the inaccurate, non-factual and disparaging statements of Ms. Barrino's reputation, character and image."

In 2011, Aretha Franklin stated Barrino and Jennifer Hudson were on her list of people to play her in a planned biographical movie. Hudson ended up portraying her in the film Respect (2021). On October 7, RCA Music Group announced it was disbanding J Records along with Arista Records and Jive Records. With the shutdown, Barrino (and all other artists previously signed to these three labels) will release her future material on the RCA Records brand. On February 13, 2012, VH1 named Barrino 32nd out of the 100 Greatest Women in Music. Barrino was featured on a cover version of Cyndi Lauper's "True Colors" with Kelly Price and Faith Evans from Evans' compilation album R&B Divas, which was released on October 2, 2012.

On December 19, 2012, Barrino premiered her new single, "Lose to Win". During an interview on Steve Harvey's morning radio show, Barrino revealed that the album's release date would be March 13, 2013. However, on February 28, 2013, via her Facebook page, Barrino announced that her album would be released on April 23, 2013. The album was available for pre-order on March 19, 2013. On April 19, 2013, Barrino revealed that her next single would be "Without Me", featuring Kelly Rowland and Missy Elliott. In June 2013, Barrino embarked on a five-date tour with Andrea Bocelli. In an interview on Today in that same month, she revealed that she will return to Broadway in October 2013.

Barrino starred in the musical revue After Midnight which opened on Broadway on November 3, 2013, with previews beginning on October 18 at the Brooks Atkinson Theatre. Her role ended on February 9, 2014. She had received rave reviews from critics for her performance. New York Post wrote "... although I admired Ms. Barrino's heartfelt performance in 'The Color Purple,' I was surprised at how smoothly and intuitively she slid into the vocal persona of a jazz singer." Barrino was the first of a rotating roster of special guest stars that also included k.d. lang, Toni Braxton and Babyface. On March 20, 2014, it was announced that Barrino will return to the production for a second stint for four weeks, beginning on May 13 through June 8. Barrino performed alongside the cast and Patti LaBelle and Gladys Knight at the 68th Tony Awards. In August 2013, Barrino co-wrote and recorded the theme song "In the Middle of the Night" for The Butler. The song was longlisted for an Academy Award for Best Original Song but did not end up receiving a nomination.

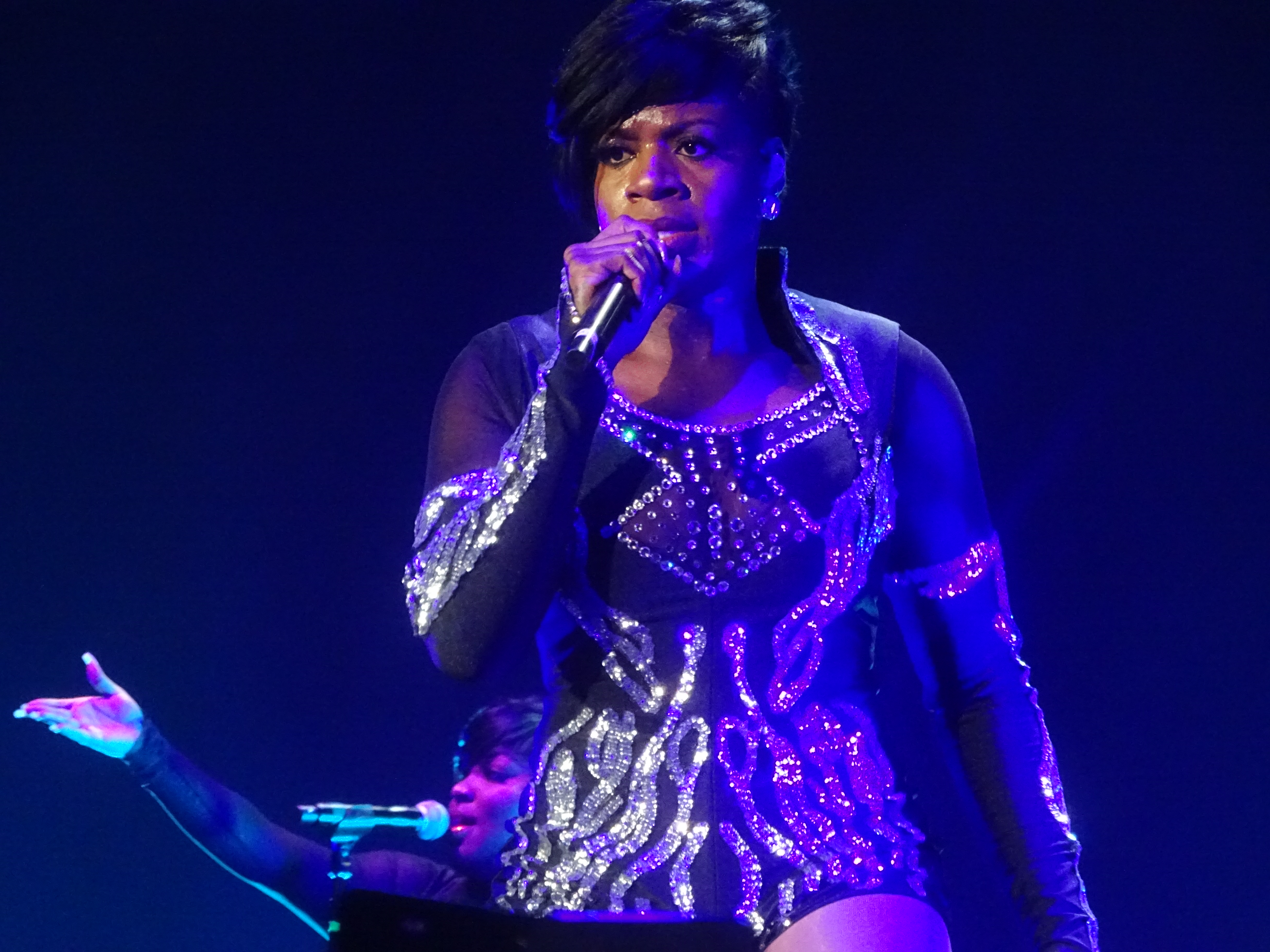
Barrino performing in 2017

On October 16, 2014, Barrino was inducted into the North Carolina Music Hall of Fame. Barrino appeared on Dave Koz's new Christmas album, December 25, which consisted of a collection of Christmas-themed duets. The album was released on September 30, 2014. In November 2014, Barrino teamed up with former Destiny's Child member Michelle Williams on the remix of Williams' "If We Had Your Eyes". In November, Barrino announced that she had started work on her next album. She posted a short clip of her and R. Kelly in the studio on her official Instagram account. "No Time for It", the first single from the album, was released on January 7, 2016. Barrino is working with music executive and producer Ron Fair.

Barrino toured with Anthony Hamilton beginning on April 21, 2016, in Buffalo, New York. The Definition Of... was released in the United States on July 29, 2016, and debuted at number six on the Billboard 200 Chart, selling 32,000 units The album also topped that week's Billboard R&B Albums Chart and was No. 2 on the Top R&B/Hip-Hop Album's chart making it Barrino's fourth top ten album. The new album featured two top 10 singles on the Adult R&B Songs airplay chart: "No Time for It", which peaked at number six, and "Sleeping with the One I Love", which peaked at number 9.

=== 2017–present: Career fluctuations ===
After parting ways with longtime label home RCA Records, Barrino released Christmas After Midnight on October 6, 2017, via Concord. She promoted the album by embarking on the Christmas After Midnight Tour. On August 31, 2018, Barrino performed at Aretha Franklin's funeral. On February 10, 2019, she paid the tribute to Aretha Franklin at the 2019 Grammy Awards, alongside Andra Day and Yolanda Adams, and again at Aretha! A Grammy Celebration for the Queen of Soul, which was hosted by filmmaker Tyler Perry. Barrino was also a performer at Motown 60: A Grammy Celebration, which took place on April 21, 2019. She paid tribute to Mary Wells, singing "My Guy".

On March 9, 2019, Barrino revealed via her official Instagram account that her sixth studio album, Sketchbook, is complete and will feature 14 tracks. Barrino revealed that the album will include features from Meghan Trainor, T-Pain, T.I., Jazmine Sullivan and Brandy. The album's first single, "Enough" was released on May 3, 2019. The single peaked at number nine on the Billboard Adult R&B Songs chart. This marks her twelfth top ten hit on the chart. In September 2019, Barrino recorded the theme song "Shine" for the daytime talk show Tamron Hall. In October 2022, Barrino revealed via an Instagram Live session with singer Tamar Braxton that she was working on two albums and one of the albums will be a gospel album.

Barrino reprised her role as Celie in the 2023 movie musical adaptation of The Color Purple. The film was released on December 25, 2023. Katie Walsh of Los Angeles Times praised Barrino for her "stunning performance as Celie, holding the emotional center over decades." She won an NAACP Image Award for Outstanding Lead Actress in a Motion Picture and earned nominations for the Golden Globe Award for Best Actress - Motion Picture Comedy or Musical and the BAFTA Award for Best Actress in a Leading Role for it. Fantasia along with the cast received the Ensemble Award from the Critics' Choice Association's Celebration of Cinema & Television: Honoring Black, Latino and AAPI Achievements.

In July 2024, Barrino sang the national anthem at the 2024 A Capitol Fourth concert. In March 2025 Fantasia announced she was working on a new record project with gospel music inspirations. On August 20, 2025 she collaborated on "Boots on the Ground (Remix)" with 803Fresh, which was nominated at the 57th NAACP Image Awards for Outstanding Duo, Group or Collaboration (Traditional). Fantasia received a star on the Hollywood Walk of Fame in 2025.

In January 2026, it was announced that Barrino will star in Tyler Perry's upcoming film, The Gospel of Christmas for Netflix.

== Personal life ==
In September 2005, Barrino published a memoir, dictated to a freelance writer, titled Life Is Not a Fairy Tale. In it, she revealed she was functionally illiterate. In 2006, following the release of her autobiography, Barrino's father sued her for $10 million after she said unflattering things about him in the book that he claimed were false.

On December 9, 2008, Barrino's 6,600-square-foot (610 m^{2}), lakefront home in Charlotte's Glynmoor Lakes at Piper Glen community was in foreclosure and would be up for auction. Her 4,500-square-foot (420 m^{2}) home, also in Piper Glen, is unaffected. The home was due to be auctioned in January 2009 by the Mecklenburg County Sheriff's Office after the company Broward Energy Partners, which had paid over $68,000 of her taxes in 2006, said it had not been fully repaid. The auction earnings were to be used to finish reimbursing the company for the loan, on which Barrino had paid back $10,000. The auction was canceled after Barrino's attorneys and the lender reached an "eleventh-hour deal", the details of which were not disclosed.

She dated former NFL player Michael Clayton, who was at the time playing for the Tampa Bay Buccaneers.

An August 2010 divorce filing in Mecklenburg County District Court alleges that Barrino had a year-long relationship with Antwaun Cook, who was married, bringing up the subject of alienation of affection laws in North Carolina. Barrino claimed the two began dating after Cook and his wife Paula separated. In December 2010, a North Carolina judge ruled in Barrino's favor, stating the Cooks' separation date was September 14, 2009, and not June 2010 as Paula previously claimed.

On August 9, 2010, Barrino was hospitalized in Pineville, North Carolina, due to overdosing on aspirin and an unknown sleep aid.

In December 2011 she gave birth to a son.

On July 18, 2015, she married Kendall Taylor, a businessman.

In 2019, Barrino stoked controversy during an interview on The Breakfast Club radio show. She claimed women were not to lead their households, and that the reason so many women were single is because they were trying to be the leader of a relationship, a position that should fall to the man. Barrino also said it was "generational curse" women were trying to control relationships and stated her belief women should submit to their male partners.

In November 2020, Barrino revealed that she was expecting her first child with husband Kendall Taylor. In May 2021, she gave birth to a daughter.

On November 29, 2022, Sigma Gamma Rho sorority announced that Barrino was inducted as an honorary member of their sorority.

Barrino took a break from her musical and acting career in order to return to school and enrolled at Central State University to study business.

== Artistry ==
=== Voice ===
Barrino's voice has been described as raspy, gritty and soulful, reminiscent of Tina Turner.

=== Influences ===
Barrino has said from childhood she has been influenced by soul singers Aretha Franklin, Patti LaBelle, and Chaka Khan, and grew up listening to jazz singers Billie Holiday, Ella Fitzgerald, Cab Calloway and Nina Simone. Barrino has drawn many comparisons to her idols. LaBelle affectionately calls Barrino "baby Patti". "[Fantasia's] just a baby me...when you see yourself in someone else, you say, 'God I'm 70, she's 30,' so she's like the Patti Labelle from back in the day and everything and she's so raw", LaBelle stated in an interview. She always credit her church upbringing and cites The Clark Sisters as one of her influences. Barrino is also an admirer of rock music and was influenced by Queen, Tina Turner and Elton John. Her fourth album, Side Effects of You introduced a new and much edgier rock-inspired sound which she coined as 'rock soul'. During an interview with Billboard.com, Barrino has stated that she would like to go in more of a rock direction for her fifth studio album. "This whole rock soul direction has been on my heart. I'll always be soulful: I started singing in the church at the age of five. So that will never go anywhere. But there's a certain side of me that wants to tap into that whole rock world. It's hard to come from R&B to that. But it's something I believe in and will fight for", Barrino said in the interview.

Over the course of her career, Barrino has inspired other artists, including American Idol season eleven contestant Joshua Ledet who was dubbed "Mantasia" by fans, the media and even Barrino herself. Actress Amber Riley revealed her admiration for Barrino in an interview on The Arsenio Hall Show and cited her as an "inspiration". In 2017, filmmaker Tyler Perry referred to Barrino as one of the greatest singers of all time during Barrino's concert in Atlanta.

=== Genres ===
Barrino's music is mostly contemporary R&B, heavily rooted in soul music and gospel music. Her lyrics speak of love, pain and resilience. She also incorporates pop, funk, reggae and hip hop into her music. Side Effects of You demonstrated the versatility of Barrino's voice. Barrino introduced a new and much edgier rock-inspired sound which she coined as 'rock soul'. Gerrick D. Kennedy from the Los Angeles Times praised the album as "sumptuous contemporary R&B dipped in vintage rock and soul". Andy Kellman from Allmusic called it "her finest album yet". Barrino further showcased her versatility and expanded her range while starring in Broadway musicals The Color Purple and After Midnight, as well as her mini-tour with Italian tenor Andrea Bocelli.

== Legacy and achievements ==
Since winning American Idol in 2004, Barrino has won numerous accolades, including a Grammy Award, two Billboard Awards, five NAACP Image Awards and two ASCAP Awards, along with nominations for a Golden Globe Award and a British Academy Film Award. She has often been referred to by music critics as "The Queen of Rock Soul". VH1 ranked her number 32 out of the 100 Greatest Women in Music (2012). She has also been inducted into the North Carolina Music Hall of Fame. In 2024, Barrino was named one of the most influential people in the world by Time. She was selected to receive a star on the Hollywood Walk of Fame in 2025.

Her first single "I Believe", debuted on the Billboard Hot 100 at number-one, making Barrino the second artist in history to achieve this with a debut single. Barrino was named the number-one artist of the Adult Urban Contemporary format, according to the December 13, 2005, issue of Billboard magazine. She was the first artist of any kind to simultaneously hold the top two spots of the top three on the Billboard Hot Adult R&B Airplay; Her song, "Truth Is" spent fourteen weeks at the number-one position. Barrino's American Idol performance of the Porgy and Bess standard "Summertime" was named amongst the AOL's 2004 list of greatest television moments.

Barrino received the NAACP Image Award for Outstanding Actress in a Motion Picture for her performance in The Color Purple (2023). Barrino also earned nominations for the Golden Globe Award for Best Actress – Motion Picture Comedy or Musical, and the BAFTA Award for Best Actress in a Leading Role for the performance, along with a shared nomination for the Screen Actors Guild Award for Outstanding Performance by a Cast in a Motion Picture.

== Discography ==
- Free Yourself (2004)
- Fantasia (2006)
- Back to Me (2010)
- Side Effects of You (2013)
- The Definition of... (2016)
- Christmas After Midnight (2017)
- Sketchbook (2019)

== Filmography ==
=== Films ===
Year	Title	Role	Notes
2023	The Color Purple	Celie Harris-Johnson	Feature film debut
2026	Tyler Perry's The Gospel of Christmas	Rebecca	Netflix film

=== Television ===
Year	Title	Role	Notes
2004	American Idol	Contestant/Winner	Has made numerous musical guest appearances on seasons afterward
2004	American Dreams	Aretha Franklin	Episode; performed "Respect"
2005	The Simpsons	Clarissa Wellington	Voice; Episode: "A Star Is Torn"
2005	All of Us	Herself	Episode: "So I Creep"
2006	The Fantasia Barrino Story: Life Is Not a Fairy Tale	Herself	Television film
2007	An Evening of Stars: Tribute to Aretha Franklin	Herself	Tribute performer; performed "Rock Steady" and "Baby I Love You"
2009	An Evening of Stars: Tribute to Patti LaBelle	Herself	Tribute performer; performed "Lady Marmalade" and "Somebody Loves You Baby"
2009	Soul Train Awards	Herself	Tribute to Chaka Khan; performed "Tell Me Something Good"
2010	Fantasia for Real	Herself	Reality series; 20 episodes
2010	Wrestlemania 26	Herself	Performed America the Beautiful
2010	Black Girls Rock!	Herself	Performed A Brand New Day and I'm Every Woman
2011	An Evening of Stars: Tribute to Chaka Khan	Herself	Tribute performer; performed "Tell Me Something Good"
2011	RuPaul's Drag Race	Herself	Celebrity guest judge on season 3
2013	Centric Live: Fantasia at the Filmore	Herself	Concert special
2014	Celebrities Undercover	Herself	Episode: "Fantasia Barrino and Lil Kim"
2016	The BET Honors	Herself	Tribute to Patti LaBelle
2016	The Definition Of... Fantasia	Herself	Televised concert
2016	Joyful Noise	Herself	Performed "Necessary" and "I Made It" (with Tye Tribbett)

=== Stage ===
Year	Title	Role	Notes	Ref.
2007–2008	The Color Purple	Celie Harris-Johnson	Broadway	
2009–2010	The Color Purple	Celie Harris-Johnson	National tour	
2013–2014	After Midnight	Special guest star	Broadway	

== Bibliography ==
- Life Is Not a Fairy Tale (2005)

== Tours ==
Headlining

- 2010–11: Back to Me Tour
- 2013: Side Effects of You Tour
- 2016: The Definition Of... Tour
- 2017: Christmas After Midnight Tour
- 2019: The Sketchbook Tour

Co-headlining

- 2004: American Idols LIVE! Tour 2004 (with the Top 10 finalist of American Idol 2004)
- 2005: Find Your Way Tour (with Kem and Rahsaan Patterson)
- 2016: Fantasia & Anthony Hamilton: Live in Concert (with Anthony Hamilton)
- 2016: Annual Summer Jam (with Maxwell and Ro James)

Opening act

- 2005: Touch the Sky Tour (for Kanye West)
- 2006: Unpredictable Tour (for Jamie Foxx)
- 2011: Intimacy Tour (for Kem)
- 2013: 2013 World Tour (for Andrea Bocelli)
- 2017: In It to Win It Tour (for Charlie Wilson)

== See also ==
- List of Idols winners
