= Bittersweet (Fantasia song) =

Single by Fantasia

from the album Back to Me
- Released: May 11, 2010
- Genre: R&B
- Length: 4:02
- Label: J
- Songwriters: Charles Harmon; Claude Kelly
- Producer: Chuck Harmony

Fantasia singles chronology
| "Even Angels" (2010) | "Bittersweet" (2010) | "I'm Doin' Me" (2010) |

Audio sample
- file; help

"Bittersweet" is a song performed by American singer Fantasia from her third studio album, Back to Me. The song was released on May 11, 2010 as the lead single from the album.

Fantasia's work on "Bittersweet" won her the Grammy Award for Best Female R&B Vocal Performance at the 2011 Grammy Awards, the last song to win this category. "Bittersweet" was also nominated for Best R&B Song. The song also won the 2011 NAACP Image Award for Best Song.

== Composition and critical reception ==
"Bittersweet" is a down-tempo R&B song which also derives from soul music. According to Margaret Wappler of the Los Angeles Times, its introduction is composed of "anguished" piano notes and "gut-socking" moans. The song lyrically sees its protagonist reminiscing on a past love.

Margaret Wappler of the Los Angeles Times said Fantasia's best moment on Back to Me was "Bittersweet", stating that it was "smartly chosen as the album’s first single." Mikael Wood of Entertainment Weekly recommended the song as a download from the album, calling it an "old-school slow jam." On songs such as "Bittersweet", Mariel Concepcion of Billboard said "her distinct voice is most enjoyable when singing heartfelt ballads." Jonathan Keefe of Slant Magazine was less enthusiastic of the song, commenting that it "barely has a melodic line" and that it "just lets Fantasia do what she can with its bathetic series of clichés."

== Promotion ==
To promote the track, Fantasia has appeared on shows such as American Idol, Lopez Tonight and Good Morning America.

== Chart performance ==
"Bittersweet" peaked at number 7 on the US Billboard Hot R&B/Hip-Hop Songs and number 74 on the US Billboard Hot 100 chart. It has sold 90,000 copies in the United States and 67,576 in South Korea.

== Music video ==
A music video for "Bittersweet," directed by Lenny Bass. It premiered on June 25, 2010 on Vevo. The video features professional football player Devin Thomas as Fantasia's love interest.

== Track listing ==
- Digital download
1. "Bittersweet" – 4:02

== Charts ==
=== Weekly charts ===
Weekly chart performance for "Bittersweet"
| Chart (2010) | Peak position |
|---|---|
| South Korea International (Circle) | 32 |
| Japan (Japan Hot 100) | 83 |
| US Billboard Hot 100 | 74 |
| US Hot R&B/Hip-Hop Songs (Billboard) | 7 |

=== Year-end charts ===
Year-end chart performance for "Bittersweet"
| Chart (2010) | Position |
|---|---|
| US Adult R&B Songs (Billboard) | 6 |
| US Hot R&B/Hip-Hop Songs (Billboard) | 22 |
