= Fantasia discography =

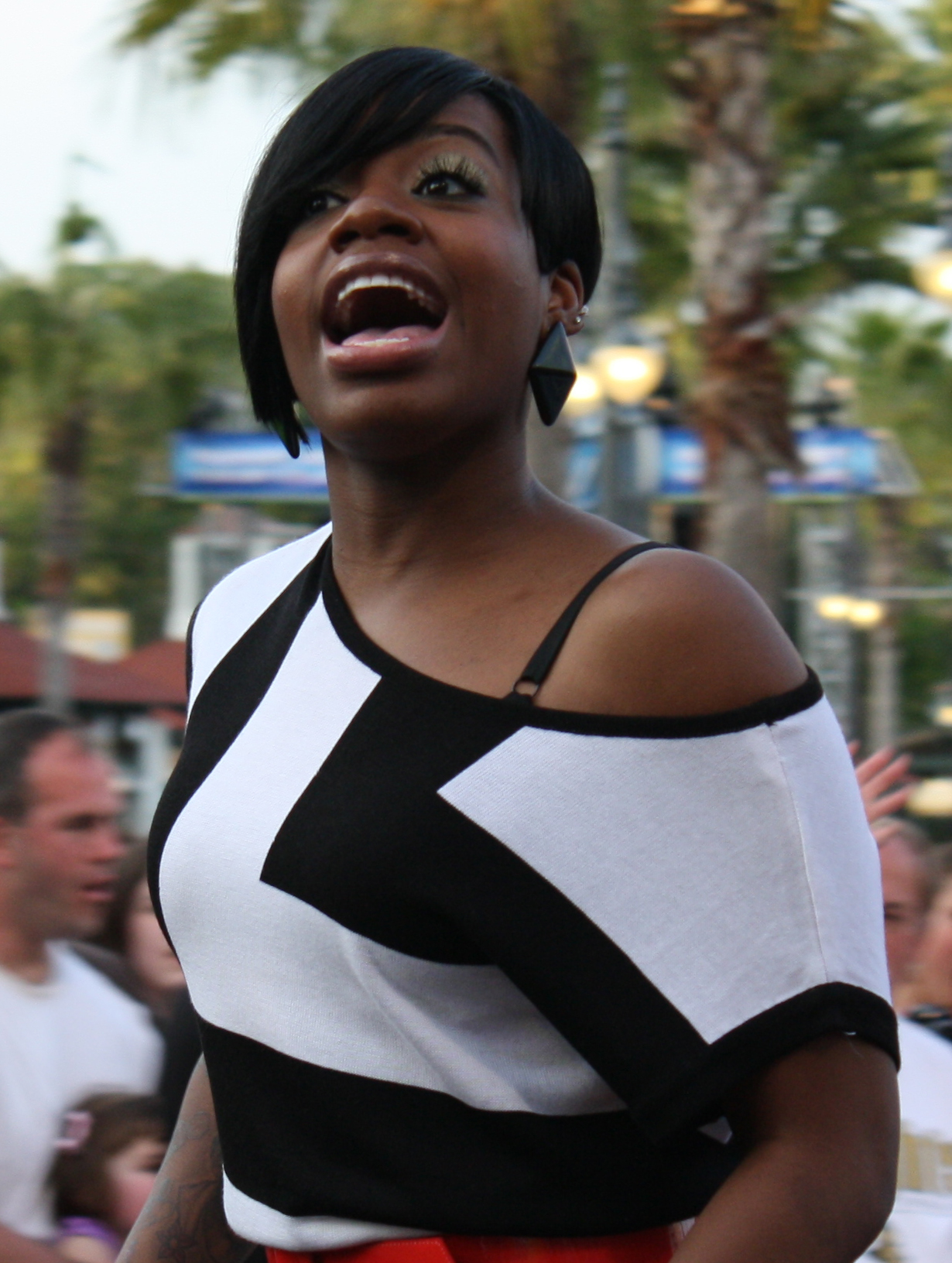
- Fantasia in The American Idol Experience motorcade at Walt Disney World
- Studio albums: 7
- Singles: 24
- Music videos: 8

The discography of American R&B and gospel singer Fantasia, consists of seven studio albums and 24 singles. At the age of nineteen, she won the third season of American Idol, earning a record deal with 19 Entertainment and J Records. The season's coronation song, "I Believe", debuted at number one on the Billboard Hot 100. It also peaked at number one in Canada, in addition to reaching numbers four and twenty in Australia and New Zealand, respectively.

Later in 2004, she released her debut studio album, Free Yourself, which debuted at number eight on the Billboard 200, and number two on the Top R&B/Hip-Hop Albums chart. It was eventually certified Platinum by the Recording Industry Association of America, and as of August 2010, has sold over 1.8 million copies in the US. The album spawned two US Hot R&B/Hip-Hop Songs top five singles such as the title track and "Truth Is". "Baby Mama" was also released, and charted on the Hot 100, while "It's All Good" and "Ain't Gon' Beg You" were also released. After the release of her debut album, Fantasia also appeared on "Hypothetically", a single from Lyfe Jennings' album, Lyfe 268-192.

Fantasia's self-titled, second studio album, was released in 2006. Although selling 133,000 discs in its first week of availability, the album only managed to peak at number nineteen in the US. However, it did reach number three on the R&B albums chart, and was eventually certified Gold in the US. The album contained the single, "When I See U", which is Fantasia's most successful single to date other than her Idol coronation single. "When I See U" peaked at thirty-two on the Hot 100, and spent eight weeks at number one the US R&B chart. The song was certified Gold in the US, and according to Billboard, ranks at number eight on the 2000s decade-end R&B chart. Fantasia also spawned two other singles: "Hood Boy", featuring rapper Big Boi, and "Only One U". In 2007, Fantasia was also a featured artist on Aretha Franklin's single, "Put You Up on Game".

After a four-year hiatus, Fantasia returned in 2010 with the release of Back to Me, which debuted at number two on the Billboard 200, and became her first album to top the R&B albums chart. Its lead single "Bittersweet" reached number seven on the US R&B chart. The album also spawned the single "I'm Doin' Me", which has peaked in the top twenty of the US R&B chart.

Fantasia released her fourth studio album, Side Effects of You, on April 23, 2013, which debuted at number two on the Billboard 200 and number one on the R&B albums chart. The album is Fantasia's first release on RCA Records after her previous record label J Records dissolved in 2011. The album was preceded by the singles "Lose to Win" on January 8 and "Without Me" on April 17, 2013. "Without Me" debuted at number 74 on the Billboard Hot 100.

As of March 2018, Fantasia had sold more than three million albums in the United States.

== Albums ==
=== Studio albums ===
List of albums, with selected chart positions, sales figures and certifications
Title	Album details	Peak chart positions			Certifications	Sales
Title	Album details	US	US R&B /HH	US R&B	Certifications	Sales
Free Yourself	Released: November 23, 2004; Label: J; Format: CD, digital download	8	2	—	RIAA: Platinum	US: 1,839,000
Fantasia	Released: December 12, 2006; Label: J; Format: CD, digital download	19	3	—	RIAA: Gold	US: 530,000
Back to Me	Released: August 24, 2010; Label: J; Format: CD, digital download	2	1	—		US: 490,000
Side Effects of You	Released: April 23, 2013; Label: RCA; Format: CD, digital download	2	1	1		US: 300,000
The Definition Of...	Released: July 29, 2016; Label: RCA; Format: CD, digital download	6	2	1		US: 32,000
Christmas After Midnight	Released: October 6, 2017; Label: Concord; Format: CD, digital download	193	—	23		
Sketchbook	Released: October 11, 2019; Label: BMG; Format: CD, digital download	62	33	5		

== Singles ==
=== As lead artist ===
List of singles, with selected chart positions and certifications, showing year released and album name
Title	Year	Peak chart positions										Certifications	Album
Title	Year	US	US R&B /HH	US R&B /HH Airplay	US Adult R&B	AUS	CAN	CIS	JPN	KOR Int.	NZ	Certifications	Album
"I Believe"	2004	1	12	67	22	4	1	—	—	—	20	ARIA: Gold; MC: 2× Platinum	Non-album single
"Truth Is"	2004	21	2	2	1	—	—	—	—	—	—		Free Yourself
"Baby Mama"	2005	60	16	16	24	—	—	—	—	—	—		Free Yourself
"Free Yourself"	2005	41	3	2	1	—	—	—	—	—	—		Free Yourself
"It's All Good"	2005	—	—	—	—	—	—	75	—	—	—		Free Yourself
"Ain't Gon' Beg You"	2005	—	37	37	27	—	—	—	—	—	—		Free Yourself
"Hood Boy" (featuring Big Boi)	2006	— (Note: "Hood Boy" did not enter the Billboard Hot 100, but peaked at number three on the Bubbling Under Hot 100 Singles chart.)	21	21	29	—	—	—	—	—	—		Fantasia
"When I See U"	2007	32	1	1	2	—	—	—	—	—	91	RIAA: Gold; BPI: Platinum; RMNZ: 2× Platinum	Fantasia
"Only One U"	2007	—	36	36	19	—	—	—	—	—	—		Fantasia
"Bittersweet"	2010	74	7	7	1	—	—	—	83	32	—		Back to Me
"I'm Doin' Me"	2010	— (Note: "I'm Doin' Me" did not enter the Billboard Hot 100, but peaked at number one on the Bubbling Under Hot 100 Singles chart.)	11	11	3	—	—	—	—	—	—		Back to Me
"Collard Greens & Cornbread"	2011	—	47	47	9	—	—	—	—	—	—		Back to Me
"Lose to Win"	2013	— (Note: "Lose to Win" did not enter the Billboard Hot 100, but peaked at number two on the Bubbling Under Hot 100 Singles chart.)	38	19	3	—	—	—	—	76	—		Side Effects of You
"Without Me" (featuring Kelly Rowland and Missy Elliott)	2013	74	26	6	2	—	—	—	—	—	—		Side Effects of You
"Side Effects of You"	2013	—	—	—	19	—	—	—	—	94	—		Side Effects of You
"No Time for It"	2016	—	—	28	6	—	—	—	—	—	—		The Definition Of...
"Sleeping with the One I Love"	2016	—	—	37	7	—	—	—	—	—	—		The Definition Of...
"When I Met You"	2017	—	—	—	18	—	—	—	—	—	—		The Definition Of...
"Enough"	2019	—	—	16	2	—	—	—	—	—	—		Sketchbook
"PTSD" (featuring T-Pain)	2019	—	—	43	11	—	—	—	—	—	—		Sketchbook
"Holy Ghost"	2019	—	—	—	—	—	—	—	—	—	—		Sketchbook
"Have Your Way"	2025	— (Note: "Have Your Way" did not enter the Billboard Hot 100, but peaked at No. 14 on the Billboard Top Gospel Songs)	—	—	—	—	—	—	—	—	—		Non-album single

=== As featured artist ===
List of singles, with selected chart positions and certifications, showing year released and album name
Title	Year	Peak chart positions	Album
Title	Year	US R&B /HH	Album
"Hypothetically" (Lyfe Jennings featuring Fantasia)	2006	38	Lyfe 268-192
"Put You Up on Game" (Aretha Franklin Duet Fantasia)	2007	41	Jewels in the Crown: All-Star Duets with the Queen
"If We Had Your Eyes (Remix)" (Michelle Williams featuring Fantasia)	2013	—	Journey to Freedom
"Love & Sex" (Joe featuring Fantasia)	2013	—	Doubleback: Evolution of R&B

== Other charted songs ==
List of singles, with selected chart positions
Title	Year	Peak chart positions	Album
Title	Year	KOR Int.	Album
"Falling In Love Tonight"	2010	72	Back to Me

== Album appearances ==
List of songs in which Fantasia performs as a lead or featured artist, showing year released, album, and other artists
Song	Year	Album	Other artist(s)
"Til My Baby Comes Home"	2005	So Amazing: An All-Star Tribute to Luther Vandross	Fantasia
"4 My Man"	2005	The Cookbook	Missy Elliott
"Blame It on the Rain"	2006	Overnight Sensational	Sam Moore
"I Wish"	2006	Happy Feet: Music from the Motion Picture	Yolanda Adams, Patti LaBelle
"Endow Me"	2006	Grateful	Coko, Faith Evans, Lil Mo
"I'm His Only Woman"	2008	Jennifer Hudson	Jennifer Hudson
"I Wanna Be Your Man"	2010	Just Charlie	Charlie Wilson
"Hood"	2012	—N/a	Ricco Barrino
"True Colors"	2012	R&B Divas	Faith Evans, Kelly Price
"Sky Is the Limit"	2013	Becoming King	Los
"Love & Sex"	2013	Double Back: Evolution of R&B	Joe
"In the Middle of the Night"	2013	Lee Daniels' the Butler Original Motion Picture Soundtrack	—N/a
"What Christmas Means to Me"	2013	The Best Man Holiday – Original Motion Picture Soundtrack	—N/a
"Medley: "O Come All Ye Faithful"/"Angels We Have Heard on High"/"Hark! The Herald Angels Sing"	2014	The 25th of December	Dave Koz

== Music videos ==
=== As self ===
List of music videos, showing year released and director
Title	Year	Director
"Truth Is"	2005	Diane Martel
"Free Yourself"	2005	Lenny Bass
"Hood Boy"	2006	Ray Kay
"When I See U"	2007	Lenny Bass
"Bittersweet"	2010	Lenny Bass
"I'm Doin' Me"	2010	Benny Boom
"Lose to Win"	2013	Steven Gomillion and Dennis Leupold
"Without Me"	2013	Steven Gomillion and Dennis Leupold

=== As featured artist ===
Title	Artist	Year	Director
"Hypothetically"	Lyfe Jennings (featuring Fantasia)	2005	
"Let's Dance"	Ricco Barrino (featuring Fantasia)	2023	Nyrell Dwayne Griffith
