= Brian Kennedy (music producer) =

American songwriter and producer (born 1983)

Brian Kennedy Seals
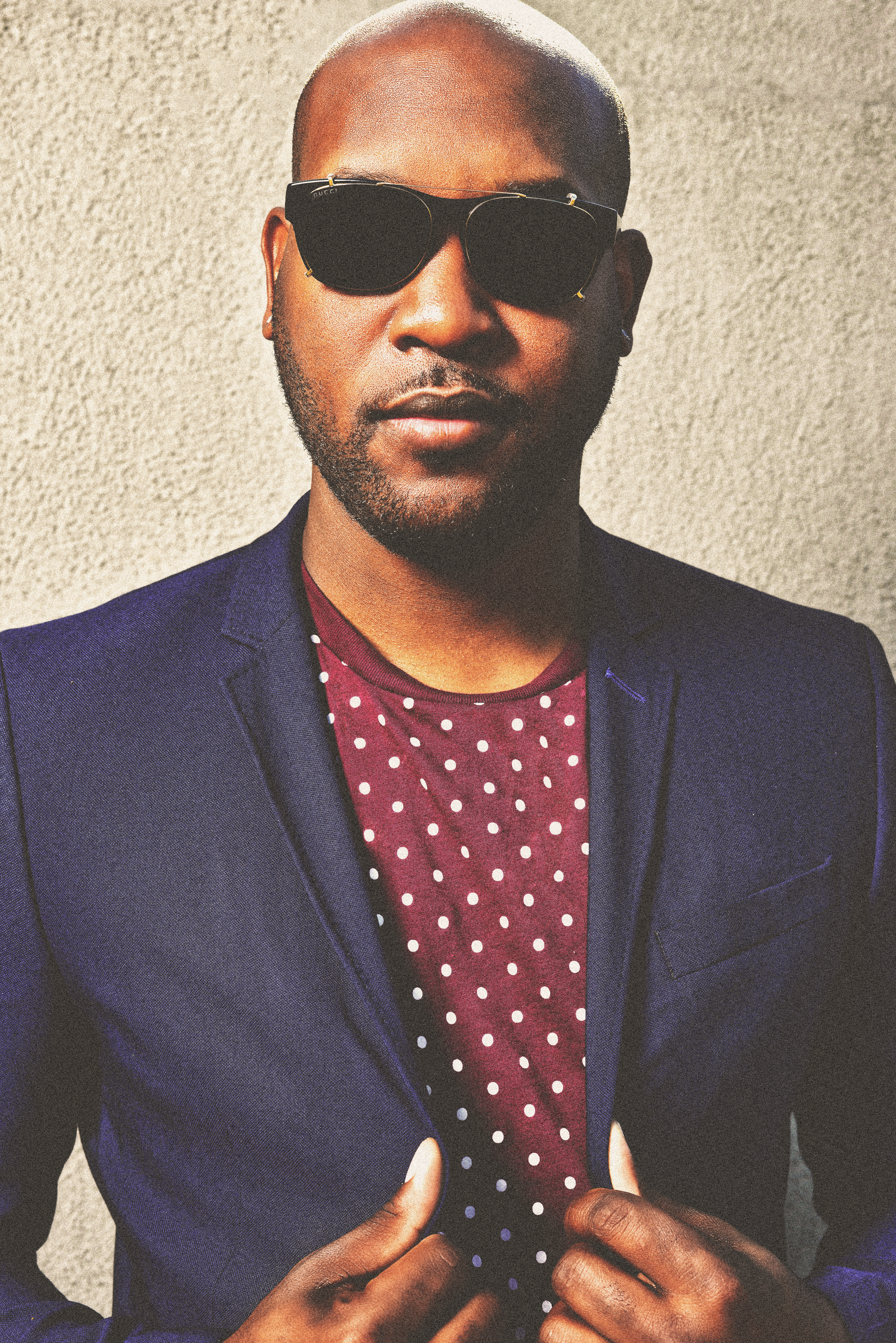
- Seals in 2013

Background information
- Born: August 8, 1983 (age 43); Kansas City, Missouri, U.S.
- Genres: R&B; pop; hip-hop
- Occupations: Songwriter; record producer; multi-instrumentalist
- Label: Universal Music Publishing Group
- Website: briankennedy.me

Brian Kennedy Seals (born August 8, 1983) is an American record producer, songwriter, and multi-instrumentalist from Kansas City, Missouri. He has been credited on hit singles such as "Disturbia" by Rihanna, "Forever" by Chris Brown, and "Mr. Know It All" by Kelly Clarkson, as well as hit R&B singles including "If This Isn't Love" by Jennifer Hudson, "What It Is (Block Boy)" by Doechii, and "No Time for It" by Fantasia Barrino.

== Career ==
=== Music industry beginnings ===
Born in Kansas City, Missouri, Seals was a classically trained piano prodigy, and became an accomplished pianist by the age of 8, writing his own songs and performing in the Kansas City Boys' Choir. He would create jazz, contemporary, and Christmas albums from his compositions. Seals relocated to Los Angeles in 2004 at the age of 20, beginning as a session player for Diane Warren, the Underdogs, and Babyface. He would catch his big break in 2006, when he produced and co-wrote the track "My Love" from Ciara's second album, Ciara: The Evolution, leading him to secure a publishing deal.

=== Further songwriting success ===
His placement on Ciara's album was soon followed by two Billboard Hot 100-number one singles in 2007: "Disturbia" for Rihanna and "Forever" for Chris Brown. Seals would continue to work with both Brown and Fenty, resulting in numerous future album placements on their projects, co-written demos for inclusion on the projects of other artists, as well as co-written songs worked on in collaboration with other artists (such as Joe Jonas' "See No More" ). Seals participated in initial sessions for Usher's 2008 album Here I Stand, and a contribution of his ("Angel") was even tipped in various publications to be the "emotional centerpiece" of the project by participating writers, but the album changed direction and his contributions did not make the final cut. Seals would then begin work on R&B singer Brandy Norwood's comeback album Human as executive producer, but would be later replaced by frequent Norwood collaborator Rodney Jerkins after their long-awaited creative reunion. Seals would still contribute two songs to the album, and built a lasting writing relationship with then-unknown New Orleans songwriter Christopher "Frank Ocean" Breaux, with whom he co-wrote bonus track "Locket (Lost In Love)". Frank Ocean and Seals would collaborate frequently for the next several years alongside several other producers, creating a pre-debut album, unofficial compilation/mixtape for Breaux titled The Lonny Breaux Collection, composed of completed songs, rough demos, and songs written for other artists. In 2009, Seals contributed five songs to Disney star Corbin Bleu's second album Speed of Light. Seals would further solidify his place in the music industry with "If This Isn't Love" for Jennifer Hudson's eponymous debut album, "It's Over" and additional album tracks for Jesse McCartney album Departure, "This Time" for American Idol contestant Pia Toscano, as well as top-ten lead single "Mr. Know It All" for Kelly Clarkson's 2011 album Stronger. These initial contributions would earn Seals his first three Grammy awards (Winner's certificates for production participation on Grammy-winning albums) and first three ASCAP Awards.

=== 2012-2020: Additional Grammy success, "Don't Wake Me Up", and "No Time for It" ===
In 2012, Seals would reunite with Brown and contribute "Don't Wake Me Up" to his fifth album Fortune. Co-produced by William Orbit and originally pitched to pop artist Madonna (who was unable to record the song in time), the song would reach the top 10 of the Billboard Hot 100 and chart internationally. A copyright infringement suit for the song against Brown, Orbit, Kennedy, and Sony Music Entertainment by UK songwriter Nayeri Gregor aka Nayri (who created a song of the same name in 2009 and pitched it to several parties involved) was settled in 2016. Seals' contribution to Fenty album Unapologetic earned him further Grammy recognition during the 2014 awards season from the R&B wing of the Recording Academy. In 2016, Seals would co-write and produce lead single "No Time for It" to Fantasia's fifth album The Definition Of..., with her declaring in a Vogue interview that the song "set the atmosphere" amidst a period of upheaval in which she had recently scrapped a more jazz-flavored album concept for something that better mixed "contemporary" and "soul". Described as a label-chosen song in which "the wormy synth melody and bass line might appear on a crossover rap hit made by a popular and radio-friendly producer like DJ Mustard", the song would later reach the top 10 of the Billboard Adult R&B Songs chart. In 2017, Seals was spotted in a recording studio with Lady Gaga alongside fellow songwriter Dallas Davidson to work on songs for potential inclusion on a follow-up project to 2016 album Joanne, but the songs never came to fruition.

=== 2021-present ===
Seals recently sold a portion of his catalog to music management and IP firm Hipgnosis Songs Fund for an undisclosed sum, with subsidiary Hipgnosis Songs Capital assuming ownership of the catalog in a 2023 purchase deal.

== Personal life ==
In 2017, at the age of 33 following a urinalysis test to determine the origin of high blood pressure, doctors discovered that Seals was experiencing kidney problems. A biopsy showed he had FSGS, or focal segmental glomerulosclerosis, a relatively common form of kidney disease which decreases the kidney's ability to properly filter blood as the filters are damaged/scarred. Coupled with an improved diet and blood pressure-lowering medications, Seals subsequently received a kidney transplant from his brother Kevin, who had moved to Los Angeles to be his manager. Seals continues to be an advocate for frequent blood-pressure check-ups and early avoidance of hypertension in the African-American community.

== Selected songwriting and production credits ==
Title	Year	Artist	Album
"My Love"	2006	Ciara	Ciara: The Evolution
"How We Do It"	2006	Mario Vazquez	Mario Vazquez
"Fallen Angel"	2007	Chris Brown	Exclusive
"Disturbia"	2008	Rihanna	Good Girl Gone Bad: Reloaded
"Forever"	2008	Chris Brown	Exclusive: The Forever Edition
"Obsessed"	2008	BoA	BoA
"Lie" (featuring St. Lunatics)	2008	Nelly	Brass Knuckles
"Fall"	2008	Brandy	Human
"Locket (Locked in Love)"	2008	Brandy	Human
"I Fell"	2008	Noel Gourdin	After My Time
"It's Over"	2008	Jesse McCartney	Departure
"Runnin'"	2008	Jesse McCartney	Departure
"If This Isn't Love"	2008	Jennifer Hudson	Jennifer Hudson
"My Heart"	2008	Jennifer Hudson	Jennifer Hudson
"Lights, Camera, Action" ^{A}	2008	New Kids on the Block	The Block
"Fire Bomb"	2009	Rihanna	Rated R
"The Last Song"	2009	Rihanna	Rated R
"Crash & Burn"	2009	Jesse McCartney	Departure: Recharged Edition
"Speed of Light"	2009	Corbin Bleu	Speed of Light
"Paralyzed"	2009	Corbin Bleu	Speed of Light
"Fear of Flying"	2009	Corbin Bleu	Speed of Light
"Rock 2 It"	2009	Corbin Bleu	Speed of Light
"My Everything"	2009	Corbin Bleu	Speed of Light
"They Don't Know"	2009	Alexandra Burke	Overcome
"Control"	2009	BoA	BoA: Deluxe
"I'll Go"	2009	Chris Brown	Graffiti
"Pass Out" (featuring Eva Simons)	2009	Chris Brown	Graffiti
"Avalanche"	2009	Marié Digby	Breathing Underwater
"Overboard" (featuring Livvi Franc)	2009	Marié Digby	Breathing Underwater
"Daydreaming"	2009	Kid Sister	Ultraviolet
"Masquerade"	2009	Backstreet Boys	This Is Us
"The Difference"	2009	Westlife	Where We Are
"Easy" (With Natasha Bedingfield)	2010	Rascal Flatts	Nothing Like This
"Nobody's Singin' to Me"	2010	Jake Zyrus	Charice
"See No More"	2011	Joe Jonas	Fastlife
"Should've Kissed You"	2011	Chris Brown	F.A.M.E.
"All About You"	2011	Chris Brown	F.A.M.E.
"Get Out My Head"	2011	Keke Palmer	Awaken
"All Over Again"	2011	Big Time Rush	Elevate
"Mr. Know It All"	2011	Kelly Clarkson	Stronger
"Get It Over With"	2012	Rihanna	Unapologetic
"Meet Ya"	2012	Rita Ora	Ora
"Holla At The DJ"	2012	Coco Jones	Made Of
"Don't Wake Me Up"	2012	Chris Brown	Fortune
"Party Hard / Cadillac (Interlude" (featuring Sevyn Streeter)	2012	Chris Brown	Fortune
"Stuck on Stupid"	2012	Chris Brown	Fortune
"Guns and Roses"	2013	Jay Sean	Neon
"Business"	2014	Teyana Taylor	VII
"Partners In Crime Part Three"	2015	The Internet	Ego Death
"Smells Like Fire"	2015	CeeLo Green	Heart Blanche
"Close To You"	2016	Rihanna	Anti
"No Time for It"	2016	Fantasia	The Definition Of...
"Ivy"	2017	Mabel	Ivy to Roses
"Gravity"	2018	Daughtry	Cage to Rattle
"Smile On My Face"	2018	Exo	Don't Mess Up My Tempo
"Party Of One"	2020	Jessica Simpson	Open Book: A Memoir
"Here We Go... Again" (featuring Tyler the Creator)	2022	The Weeknd	Dawn FM
"What It Is (Block Boy)" (solo or featuring Kodak Black)	2023	Doechii	
"How Did We Get Here?" (featuring CeeLo Green)	2025	Offset	Kiari

=== Notes ===
A. ^{A} "Lights, Camera, Action" also appears as a bonus track on the 2008 Pussycat Dolls reissue album Doll Domination: International Edition.

== Demos ==
The following is a list of well-known demos and outtakes produced by Seals that have been discussed in various publications, shopped around to various artists, or have surfaced on blogs, mixtapes, and various music streaming channels:

Alexandra Burke

- "Before It Explodes" (Overcome)

Brandy

- "Freedom" (Human)
- "Glass House" (Human)
- "Gray Area" (Human)
- "Keyed" (Human)
- "Know You" (Human)
- "One Thing" (Human)
- "Surprise Ending" (Human)
- "Thank Me Later" (Human)
- "Today" (Human)
- "Zillion" (Human)

Britney Spears

- "After Tonight" (Femme Fatale)
- "Dem Chicks Be Like" (Glory)
- "Fire Drill" (Circus)
- "Oblivious" (Femme Fatale)

Chris Brown

- "Electric Guitar" (Exclusive)
- "Erased" (Cool & Dre project)
- "Glow In the Dark" (F.A.M.E.)

Frank Ocean

- "Day Away" (Lonny Breaux Collection)
- "Denim" (Lonny Breaux Collection)
- "Done" (Lonny Breaux Collection)
- "Know Better" (Lonny Breaux Collection)
- "Lost Angel" (Lonny Breaux Collection)
- "Stay If You Go" (Lonny Breaux Collection)
- "Together" (Lonny Breaux Collection)

Jordin Sparks

- "Know You" (Battlefield)

Kelly Rowland

- "On & On (The Sound)" (Here I Am)

The Backstreet Boys

- "Hologram" (This Is Us)

The Pussycat Dolls

- "Captive" (Doll Domination)

Trey Songz

- "Smile On My Face" (Tremaine: The Album)

Usher

- "All Falls Down" (UR Experience)
- "Angel" (Here I Stand)
- "Lights, Camera, Action" (Here I Stand)

== Awards and nominations ==
Year	Ceremony	Award	Result	Ref
2009	51st Annual Grammy Awards	Grammy Award for Best Dance/Electronic Recording ("Disturbia")	Nominated	
2009	51st Annual Grammy Awards	Grammy Award for Best R&B Album (Jennifer Hudson) ^{A}	Won	
2009	ASCAP Pop Awards	Most Performed Songs ("Forever")	Won	
2009	ASCAP Pop Awards	Most Performed Songs ("Disturbia")	Won	
2009	ASCAP Rhythm & Soul Awards	Most Performed Songs ("If This Isn't Love")	Won	
2012	54th Annual Grammy Awards	Grammy Award for Best R&B Album (F.A.M.E.) ^{A}	Won	
2013	55th Annual Grammy Awards	Grammy Award for Best Pop Vocal Album (Stronger) ^{B}	Won	
2013	55th Annual Grammy Awards	Grammy Award for Best Urban Contemporary Album (Fortune)	Nominated	
2013	ASCAP Pop Awards	Most Performed Songs ("Don't Wake Me Up")	Won	
2014	56th Annual Grammy Awards	Grammy Award for Best Urban Contemporary Album (Unapologetic) ^{C}	Won	
2016	58th Annual Grammy Awards	Grammy Award for Best Urban Contemporary Album (Ego Death)	Nominated	
2017	59th Annual Grammy Awards	Grammy Award for Best Urban Contemporary Album (Anti)	Nominated	
2024	ASCAP Pop Awards	Most Performed Songs ("What It Is (Block Boy)")	Won	
2024	ASCAP Rhythm & Soul Awards	Most Performed R&B/Hip-Hop Songs ("What It Is (Block Boy)")	Won	

=== Notes ===
A. ^{A} Winning producers in this category with less than a 50% album contribution are awarded with a Winner's Certificate.
B. ^{B} Winning producers in this category with less than a 50% album contribution are awarded with a Winner's Certificate.
C. ^{C} Winning producers in this category with less than a 50% album contribution are awarded with a Winner's Certificate.
