= Sleeping with the One I Love =

Single by Fantasia

from the album The Definition Of...
- Released: May 26, 2016
- Recorded: 2015
- Studio: Kennedy Compound (Hollywood) and Faircraft Studios (Brentwood)
- Genre: Soul; blues
- Length: 5:03
- Label: 19 Recordings; RCA
- Songwriter: R. Kelly
- Producer: R. Kelly

Fantasia singles chronology
| "No Time for It" (2016) | "Sleeping with the One I Love" (2016) | "When I Met You" (2017) |

"Sleeping with the One I Love" is a song recorded by American recording artist Fantasia for her fifth studio album, The Definition Of... (2016). Written and produced by R. Kelly, it was released on May 26, 2016, as the album's second single. Fantasia recorded the track as a way to expand her "rock soul" sound, which she had introduced on her previous release Side Effects of You (2013). She also used the song, and the album as a whole, to assert more creative control over her career.

A soul and blues ballad, its lyrics revolve around a woman's search for love, while being torn between her boyfriend and her lover. Media outlets had varying interpretations of the song's genre and content, with several attributing it as an example of soul and blues and describing it as containing jazz influences. Inspired by her past, Fantasia recorded the track to express her gratitude for getting through her past, negative relationships to grow as a person and form a more healthy romance. Commentators compared "Sleeping with the One I Love" to Ben E. King's 1963 single "I (Who Have Nothing)", James Brown's 1966 song "It's a Man's Man's Man's World", and Shirley Bassey's music, while Fantasia herself found similarities with her own 2005 single "Free Yourself".

Critics responded positively to "Sleeping with the One I Love", praising Fantasia's vocals and her collaboration with R. Kelly. It peaked at number seven on the Adult R&B Songs Billboard chart for the week of July 2, 2017. It was Fantasia tenth top-ten entry, and the second of the album's two top 20 singles, with "No Time for It" (2016) being the first. Fantasia performed the song during a July 28, 2016 concert broadcast on BET and the Fantasia & Anthony Hamilton: Live in Concert. A music video, directed by Derek Blanks, was released on June 26, 2016. Inspired by the American comedy-drama series Orange Is the New Black, the visual features Fantasia playing various characters in their pursuit of love while incarcerated. It received positive feedback from media outlets.

== Background and recording ==
While recording her fifth studio album The Definition Of... (2016), Fantasia sought to have more creative control over her music and image. Frustrated with the amount of record label interference in the past, she described executives' plans to determine her sound and style as "prostituting the artist’s gift", and wanted to avoid such influences for the album. Fantasia explained that the album would expand on the "rock soul" sound that she introduced on her previous release Side Effects of You (2013). She had defined "rock soul" as covering multiple style of music, describing it as an attempt to combine her soulful childhood singing in church with "a certain side of [her] that wants to tap into that whole rock world".

"Sleeping with the One I Love" was written and produced by R. Kelly. During the early stages of production for The Definition Of..., Fantasia posted several videos on her social media accounts of her recording sessions with Kelly. In promotional interviews, Fantasia said that the album was initially produced by another artist who she “really, really, really loved", but she switched to a different team for the final product. She explained: "Sometimes, when you work with producers who are artists, it’s very hard, They are doing their thing … and things got a little chaotic.” Derrick G. Kennedy of the Los Angeles Times speculated that Kelly was the producer mentioned by Fantasia.

The instrumental parts of the song were recorded by Thomas Carillo at the Kennedy Compound in Hollywood. Fantasia's vocals, produced and arranged by Ron Fair, were engineered by Fair and Pat Thrall at Faircraft Studios in Brentwood, California. Abel Garibaldi and Ian Mereness provided additional programming and engineering for the track. Dan Higgins arranged the horn section, which was engineered by Fair and John Schacter. Donnie Lylie provided additional music direction and played the guitar for the instrumental, while Steve Genewick handled the engineering for the string portion.

== Composition and lyrics ==
Described as a "vintage-y soul ballad with jazz elements" by Kevin Apaza of Direct Lyrics, "Sleeping with the One I Love" is composed in the key of D-sharp minor and has a tempo of 65 beats per minute. Singersroom's Elle Breezy wrote that the single was a "heavy blues tune", and represented how Fantasia "rock soul" sound would encompass various musical genres. AllMusic's Andy Kellman called the song "a spacious, retro-styled ballad", and The Boombox's Amber McKynzie described it as "sultry ode to 60s soul". The Tampa Bay Times' Jay Cridlin equated the single to "five minutes of slow-burning flame". Elias Leight of Vogue felt that "Sleeping with the One I Love" was "one of the more unusual songs on radio at the moment" as it did not contain strong hip hop elements, and compared it to Shirley Bassey's music.

"Sleeping with the One I Love" revolves around Fantasia feeling torn between the stability of her boyfriend and the sensual pleasures of her lover. According to Wanda J. Coppage of Music Times, the lyrics focus on "the story of a woman in search of love, but she seems to find it with the wrong type of men". Throughout the single, Fantasia "candidly and guiltlessly" discusses her affair by singing: "I’m sleeping with the man I love because the one I’m with just ain’t good enough.” In the verses, Fantasia sings about her conflict with choosing between the two men, through lyrics such as: “Yes, I've tried to shake it off, and I even tried to pray / But I'm still waking up in a bed that don't belong to me”. She expresses pain with the lyrics "See my baby's like a dream, but the other man, he haunts me". Other lyrics also include: "I'm still waking up in a bed that don't belong to me...I thought about the cost, but it's a price I'm willing to pay."

Breezy questioned if the song's content was inspired by Fantasia's past affair with a married man. The singer explained that the single was about self-love, saying: "My song talks about all the bad relationships but I'm grateful for going through them." Fantasia compared "Sleeping with the One I Love" to her 2005 single "Free Yourself", explaining that they both have "that gritty, bluesy feeling". Amber McKynzie described the main theme of the song as "what it’s like to love hard and not get the same love in return". Centric's Gerren Keith Gaynor felt that Fantasia was channeling James Brown's 1966 song "It's a Man's Man's Man's World".

== Release ==
On May 27, 2016, "Sleeping with the One I Love" was released as the second single from The Definition Of.... Apaza described it as "the latest countdown single", as two promotional singles ("Ugly" and "So Blue") were also made available prior to the album's release.

RCA Records executives had initially chosen "When I Met You" (2016) to be the album's second single, but Fantasia had disagreed with the label's decision, preferring to release "Sleeping with the One I Love" instead. The singer said that RCA did not want to promote the song as they felt it was "too churchy", but she had responded: "No, it’s the next single. I’m the one out here on stages and connecting with the people." She proceeded to conduct polls during a series of radio interviews, asking listeners to choose which track they wanted to be released. Ultimately, they voted for "Sleeping with the One I Love", which was released as the second single instead of "When I Met You". "When I Met You" would later be released as the record's third and final single on January 17, 2017.

== Reception ==
"Sleeping with the One I Love" received positive feedback from music critics. Apaza praised the single for showcasing Fantasia's vocals, writing that the singer had "out-of-this-world vocals and a grandiose emotion that will leave any listener mesmerized and in awe". Breezy felt that the single was based on a "juicy concept". Both Apaza and Breezy wrote that they were looking forward to Fantasia performing the song live. Amber McKynzie selected it as one of the album's top five tracks, and Gerren Keith Gaynor wrote that it "t[ook] story telling to new height", calling the song "soul-stirring". Jay Cridlin listed "Sleeping with the One I Love" as one of the top 25 songs of 2016, writing that Fantasia "cuts loose on a confident and expansive chunk of retro soul". In Entertainment Weekly, Chuck Arnold identified the song as one of the album's "key tracks". Andy Kellman praised her collaboration with R. Kelly as the "most pairing", writing that the song included lyrics that "she was born to sing". Sarah Grant of Rolling Stone felt that Kelly had helped Fantasia achieve her "rock soul" sound by "put[ting] her yowl to work on the excellent, chiseled single".

The single was nominated for the Grammy Award for Best Traditional R&B Performance at the 59th Annual Grammy Awards, but lost to Lalah Hathaway's 2015 single "Angel". Even though he wanted William Bell's 2016 song "The Three of Me" to win the award, Billboard's Carl Wilson wrote that "it’s too bad it’s at the expense of, among others, Fantasia’s terrific 'Sleeping With the One I Love'". The track also received a nomination for the BET Centric Award at the BET Awards 2017, but lost to Solange Knowles' 2016 single "Cranes in the Sky".

"Sleeping with the One I Love" debuted at number 21 on the Adult R&B Songs Billboard chart for the week of July 2, 2017. It peaked at number seven during the week of November 26, 2016, and stayed on the chart for a total of 13 weeks. It was Fantasia tenth top-ten entry, and the second of the album's two top 20 singles; "No Time for It" (2016) was the first.

== Music video and promotion ==
Prior to the music video's release, Fantasia posted several images of herself in costume as three fictional women (Brenda, Pauletta and Rox) on her official Instagram account. For each image, she explained the women's background, and expounded on the concept for the overall visual. The characters include a seductress and a woman who Gerren Keith Gaynor compared to Cleopatra "Cleo" Sims from the 1996 film Set It Off.

Premiering directly after the BET Awards 2016 telecast on June 26, 2016, the video features the women's struggles with love as they all pursue the attention of a prison guard. Directed by Derek Blanks, it was inspired by the American comedy-drama series Orange Is the New Black, and shows the guard "playing them all". According to a press release from RCA, Fantasia "portrays multiple characters in a compelling plot twist" in the video. Eeshé White of The Boombox summarized the video as: "Fantasia appears to be in prison, and is battling with herself." The visual includes a scene in which all of the characters fight one another. It received positive reviews from media outlets. Breezy called the video "intriguing", while Gerren Keith Gaynor described it as a "creative take" on the song.

Fantasia performed "Sleeping with the One I Love" alongside "It's a Man's Man's Man's World" during a July 28, 2016 concert broadcast on BET, the first in a series of live concerts on the cable channel. She had also included it as the final song on her set list for Fantasia & Anthony Hamilton: Live in Concert (2016).

== Track listing ==
Digital download
| No. | Title | Length |
|---|---|---|
| 1. | "Sleeping with the One I Love" | 5:03 |

== Credits and personnel ==
Credits adapted from the liner notes of The Definition Of... .

Management

- Rock Soul Records/19 Recordings
- Limited/RCA Records

Recording locations

- Music recording – Kennedy Compound (Hollywood); Faircraft Studios (Brentwood)

Personnel

- Fantasia – vocals
- R. Kelly – production, song-writing
- Ron Fair – vocal arrangement, vocal production, vocal engineer, strings arrangement, strings conductor, horn engineer, additional production
- Dan Higgins – horns arrangement
- Donnie Lyle – additional music direction, guitar
- Pat Thrall – editing, additional engineer, vocal engineer
- Abel Garibaldi – engineer, programmer
- Ian Mereness – engineer, programmer
- John Schacter – horn engineer
- Steve Genewick – strings engineer

== Charts ==
| Chart (2016) | Peak position |
|---|---|
| US Adult R&B Songs (Billboard) | 7 |

== Release history ==
| Region | Format | Date | Label |
|---|---|---|---|
| United States | May 26, 2016 | Digital download | 19; RCA |
| United States | June 6, 2016 | Urban adult contemporary | 19; RCA |
