= Ultraviolet (Kid Sister album) =

Studio album by Kid Sister
- Released: November 17, 2009
- Recorded: 2007–2009
- Studios: The Attic (Chicago); Canaan Road Studios (New York); The Band Room (Oakland); Downtown Music Studios (New York); Trizzyville Studios (Montreal); Shack Wacky Studios (New York); Encore Studios (Burbank); Larrabee Sound Studios (North Hollywood); Pulse Studios (Los Angeles); The Royal Castle (New York); EV Studios (Chicago)
- Genres: Hip-hop; electro; R&B
- Length: 37:28
- Labels: Fool's Gold; Downtown; Universal Republic
- Producers: A-Trak (also exec.); XXXChange; Steve Angello; Sebastian Ingrosso; Yuksek; Hervé; Sinden; Rusko; Brian Kennedy; DJ Gant-Man

Singles from Ultraviolet
- 1. "Control" Released: 2007; 2. "Pro Nails" Released: October 17, 2007; 3. "Get Fresh" Released: 2009; 4. "Right Hand Hi" Released: July 16, 2009; 5. "Daydreaming" Released: April 16, 2010; 6. "Big N Bad" Released: July 25, 2010

Ultraviolet is the only studio album by American rapper and singer Kid Sister, released on November 17, 2009 by Universal Republic Records. It was initially to be titled Dream Date but was changed during the recording process, along with the removal of three tracks and addition of five new ones. DJ A-Trak serves as the executive producer and the album includes production by XXXChange, Sinden, DJ Gant-Man, Hervé, Yuksek, and others. The album garnered a positive reception but critics were divided over the repetitive party content and Kid Sister's talents as a performer. Ultraviolet debuted at numbers 11 and 20 on the Billboard Top Heatseekers and Top Rap Albums charts, respectively. It spawned six singles: "Control", "Pro Nails", "Get Fresh", "Right Hand Hi", "Daydreaming", and "Big N Bad".

== Promotion ==
On September 22, 2009, Kid Sister announced a 10-city North American tour to promote Ultraviolet ahead of its release, beginning in Vancouver's Venue Nightclub and finishing at Toronto's Mod Club. On November 13, she made her television debut performing "Right Hand Hi" with Flosstradamus on Late Night with Jimmy Fallon.

== Critical reception ==
Professional ratings
Aggregate scores
Source	Rating
Metacritic	70/100
Review scores
Source	Rating
AllMusic	3/5 stars
The A.V. Club	B+
Consequence of Sound	C−
The Guardian	4/5 stars
Los Angeles Times	3.5/4 stars
Pitchfork	4.4/10
PopMatters	5/10
Rolling Stone	3.5/5 stars
Spin	8/10
The Village Voice	favorable

Ultraviolet received generally favorable reviews from music critics. At Metacritic, which assigns a normalized rating out of 100 to reviews from mainstream critics, the album received an average score of 70, based on 23 reviews.

The Guardian's Alexis Petridis noted that the record works least when going for "straightforward hip-hop" through Kid Sister's limited everyday lyricism but gave it praise for being "a great pop album" with "Ed Banger-inspired nu-rave synthesisers" and immediate choruses, concluding that: "Either way, Ultraviolet seems worth celebrating for what it is, rather than what people thought it should be." Billboard contributor Kerri Mason wrote that: "After 20-something years of rap and dance running in mostly parallel lines, Kid Sister's imagining of their intersection is fresh and unapologetically fun." Genevieve Koski of The A.V. Club praised Kid Sister's "winking lyrics and charismatic flow" for elevating the Chicago house throwback aesthetic throughout the album, concluding that: "Ultraviolet is slight in terms of subject matter and concept, but it certainly doesn't lack in personality." Todd Martens of the Los Angeles Times called it "an upbeat and futuristic club record" that displays Kid Sister's "Midwestern work ethic and sense of humor", saying that "Ultraviolet is brimming with the artist's down-to-earth candidness."

AllMusic's David Jeffries felt the producers overshadowed Kid Sister on her own record but she manages to deliver memorable quips throughout the track listing, highlighting "Pro Nails" and "Get Fresh" for having "slang queen rhymes" and a "brassy enough delivery", saying that "Ultraviolet isn't the "ladies first" declaration that was hoped for, or the redefinition of party-rap that was hinted at, but it's still highly recommended for party people." Nat Thomson of XXL gave credit to the Estelle and Cee-Lo features for allowing a break from the "dance-heavy" material that gets tiring towards the end, concluding that: "Save for the occasional spunky, flirtatious zinger, don't look for Ultraviolet to appease hungry listeners looking for lyrical food for thought. Still, Kid Sister's feminine perspective is a much-needed addition to hip-hop's current all-boys club." Ben Ratliff of The New York Times commended Kid Sister's character work and the producers for mining "different kinds of club music" throughout the album, but was critical of her rapping delivery sticking to "old-fashioned" boasts and cadences, saying that: "There's a lot about Ultraviolet you might want to like. But it runs more on concept rather than talent; too often it feels self-conscious and low on hooks."

Paste contributor Brian Howe called the record "undeniably solid" for its "ear-wormy club bangers" and Kid Sister's "pugilistic" and "resilient" flow over them but was critical of the limited subject matter and its untimely release feeling outdated. Edwin Ortiz of HipHopDX gave credit to Kid Sister and her producers for being consistent with their boasts and high energy throughout the party tracks, singling out the DJ Gant-Man-produced "Switch Board" for being her "strongest effort", but felt that aspect wasn't enough to sustain the project and criticized the more slower cuts like "Step and "You Ain't Really Down", saying that, "While Kid Sister may have made a conscious effort to instill a lasting effect through her playful cadence and free spirit antics, Ultraviolet is ultimately an album about nothing." Tom Breihan from Pitchfork felt that Ultraviolet lacked "a restless, inventive sense of fun" compared to similar projects like Spank Rock's YoYoYoYoYo and FannyPack's So Stylistic, criticizing Kid Sister's rapping skills for being bereft of intense delivery or different topics besides partying. He later highlighted "You Ain't Really Down" for showcasing "a fun approachability" in Kid Sister's "surprisingly nimble" vocal performance, concluding that: "An album of Kid Sis singing songs like this might be worth a three-year wait. An album like this one? Not so much."

== Track listing ==
No.	Title	Writer(s)	Producer(s)	Length
1.	"Right Hand Hi"	M. Young, S. Angello, S. Ingrosso, D. Macklovitch	Steve Angello, Sebastian Ingrosso	3:18
2.	"Life on TV"	M. Young, P. Busson	Yuksek, A-Trak (add.)	3:29
3.	"Big N Bad"	M. Young, J. Harvey, G. Sinden, J. Valerie, V.J. Martin	Hervé, Sinden (add.)	3:00
4.	"Step" (featuring Estelle)	M. Young, E. Swaray, C. Mercer, J. Wagner	Rusko, A-Trak (add.)	3:01
5.	"Let Me Bang 2009"	M. Young, A. Epton, C. Franke, E.W. Froese, J. Schmoelling	XXXChange	2:54
6.	"Pro Nails" (featuring Kanye West)	M. Young, A. Macklovitch, K. West, P. Houston, J. Houston, P. Beauregard	A-Trak	3:22
7.	"Daydreaming" (featuring Cee-Lo)	M. Young, M. McHenry, J. Baptiste, A. Whyte, B. Kennedy Seals	Brian Kennedy	3:01
8.	"Switch Board" (featuring DJ Gant-Man)	M. Young, G. Wilson	DJ Gant-Man	3:39
9.	"54321"	M. Young, A. Epton	XXXChange	3:07
10.	"Get Fresh"	M. Young, A. Macklovitch, A. Epton, T. Sontag, F. Senfter	A-Trak, XXXChange	2:54
11.	"You Ain't Really Down"	E. Matthew, T. Lee	A-Trak	2:46
12.	"Control"	M. Young, A. Epton	XXXChange	2:52
Total length:				37:28

Re-release bonus tracks
No.	Title	Length
13.	"Daydreaming" (featuring Cee-Lo)	3:09
14.	"Right Hand Hi" (Caspa Remix)	4:25
15.	"Daydreaming" (Jakwob Remix)	4:36
16.	"Pro Nails" (Rusko Remix)	4:24
Total length:		53:57

Sample and interpolation credits

- "Big N Bad" contains interpolations from the composition "Don't Go" written by Vincent John Martin.
- "Step" contains samples from "Boogaloo Anthem" by Funkmaster Ozone.
- "Let Me Bang 2009" contains replayed elements from "Love On A Real Train" written by Christopher Franke, Edgar W. Froese and Johannes Schmoelling.
- "Pro Nails" contains excerpts from "Good Googly Moogly" written by Patrick Houston, Jordan Houston and Paul Beauregard.
- "Get Fresh" contains samples and excerpts from "Lower State of Consciousness" by ZZT.

== Personnel ==
Credits adapted from the album's liner notes.

- Producer – Chris "Tek" O'Ryan
- Executive producer – A-Trak
- A&R – Fool's Gold, Josh Deutsch, Josh Young, Melisa Young
- A&R coordination – Julia Wilde
- A&R administration – Jayne Grodd Bronstein
- Design and illustration – Dust La Rock
- Photography – Don Flood
- Management – Peter Katsis
- Legal Counsel – Richard Grabel
- Publicity – Kathryn Frazier, Dana Meyerson
- Sample Clearance – Deborah Mannis-Gardner
- Mastering – Mandy Parnell, Chris Potter

== Charts ==
Chart (2009)	Peak position
US Heatseekers Albums (Billboard)	11
US Top R&B/Hip-Hop Albums (Billboard)	20
