= Fantasia & Anthony Hamilton: Live in Concert =

2016 concert tour

- Tour by Fantasia Barrino and Anthony Hamilton
- Promotional poster for the 2016 tour
- Start date: April 21, 2016
- End date: June 19, 2016
- Legs: 1
- No. of shows: 26 in North America
Fantasia Barrino tour chronology
Side Effects of You Tour (2013)	Fantasia & Anthony Hamilton: Live in Concert (2016)	The Definition Of... Tour (2016)
Anthony Hamilton tour chronology
Home For The Holidays Tour (2014)	Fantasia & Anthony Hamilton: Live in Concert (2016)	What I'm Feelin' Tour (2016)

Fantasia & Anthony Hamilton: Live in Concert was a co-headlining concert tour by American recording artists, Fantasia Barrino and Anthony Hamilton. Primarily visiting the United States, the tour began on April 21 in Buffalo, New York's Shea's Performing Arts Center and ended on June 19 in Charlotte, North Carolina's Bojangles' Coliseum.

== Opening acts ==
- Kevin Simpson (comedian)

== Critical reception ==
According to Singersroom, "Anthony Hamilton and Fantasia took fans on a musical journey and sang from the heart. Both singers added a modern twist to their Southern sound which was a plus because it exemplifies their originality and creativity. The concert was a great way to start off the spring tour for R&B music. These two entertainers touch people hearts through song because they made you laugh, cry, smile, and re-discover your purpose in life."

== Setlist ==
The following setlists were obtained from the June 10, 2016 concert; held at the Starlight Theatre in Kansas City, Missouri. It does not represents all concerts for the duration of the tour.

Fantasia

1. "Instrumental Sequence"
2. "Change Your Mind" (contains elements of "I'm Your Baby Tonight")
3. "Selfish (I Want You to Myself)"
4. "Don't Act Right"
5. "Instrumental Sequence" (contains elements of "Hotline Bling")
6. "Without Me"
7. "I'm Doin' Me"
8. "Instrumental Sequence"
9. "Summertime"
10. "Bittersweet"
11. "Proud Mary"
12. "Nasty Girl" / "The Bird"
13. "Instrumental Sequence"
14. "When I See U" (contains elements of "Overnight Scenario")
15. "Lose to Win"
16. "Truth Is" / "Free Yourself" / "Ain't Gon' Beg You"
17. "Sleeping with the One I Love"

Anthony Hamilton

1. "Save Me"
2. "Cool"
3. "Comin' from Where I'm From"
4. "What I'm Feelin'"
5. "Best of Me"
6. "Amen"
7. "The Point of it All"
8. "Hotline Bling" / "Respek"
9. "Soul's on Fire"
10. "Still"
11. "Charlene"
12. "So in Love"

== Tour Dates ==
Date	City	Country	Venue
North America
April 21, 2016	Buffalo	United States	Shea's Performing Arts Center
April 22, 2016	Detroit	United States	Fox Theatre
April 23, 2016	Chicago	United States	Arie Crown Theater
April 28, 2016	Newark	United States	Prudential Hall
April 29, 2016	New York City	United States	The Theater at Madison Square Garden
April 30, 2016	Baltimore	United States	Pier Six Pavilion
May 1, 2016	Columbus	United States	Palace Theatre
May 5, 2016	Greensboro	United States	Special Events Center
May 6, 2016	Washington, D.C.	United States	DAR Constitution Hall
May 8, 2016	Norfolk	United States	Ted Constant Convocation Center
May 12, 2016	Jackson	United States	Mississippi Coliseum
May 13, 2016	Southaven	United States	Landers Center
May 14, 2016	New Orleans	United States	Lakefront Arena
May 20, 2016	Los Angeles	United States	Microsoft Theater
May 22. 2016	Las Vegas	United States	The Joint
June 1, 2016	Chicago	United States	Arie Crown Theater
June 3, 2016	Philadelphia	United States	Mann Center for the Performing Arts
June 4, 2016	Cleveland	United States	State Theatre
June 5, 2016	Baltimore	United States	Pier Six Pavilion
June 9, 2016	Grand Prairie	United States	Verizon Theatre at Grand Prairie
June 10, 2016	Kansas City	United States	Starlight Theatre
June 12, 2016	Houston	United States	NRG Arena
June 16, 2016	Tampa	United States	USF Sun Dome
June 17, 2016	Atlanta	United States	Fox Theatre
June 18, 2016	Richmond	United States	Altria Theater
June 19, 2016	Charlotte	United States	Bojangles' Coliseum

=== Box office score data ===
Venue	City	Tickets sold / available	Gross revenue
The Joint	Las Vegas	2,197 / 2,732 (80%)	$163,053
Mann Center for the Performing Arts	Philadelphia	4,202 / 6,460 (65%)	$288,135
Fox Theatre	Atlanta	4,383 / 4,630 (95%)	$320,477
Altria Theater	Richmond	3,427 / 3,427 (100%)	$233,016
Ted Constant Convocation Center	Norfolk	5,233 / 5,233 (100%)	$342,235
