= Pro Nails =

Kid Sister song

Single by Kid Sister featuring Kanye West

from the album Ultraviolet and the mixtape Can't Tell Me Nothing
- B-side: "Switch Board"
- Released: October 17, 2007; April 29, 2008 (reissue); July 14, 2008 (UK)
- Genre: Hip-hop, electronica
- Length: 3:29
- Label: Fool's Gold, Downtown Records
- Songwriters: Melissa Young; Alain Macklovitch; Kanye West; Patrick Houston; Jordan Houston; Paul Beauregard
- Producer: A-Trak

Kid Sister singles chronology
"Control" (2007)	"Pro Nails" (2007)	"Beeper" (2008)

Kanye West singles chronology
"Good Life" (2007)	"Pro Nails" (2007)	"Flashing Lights" (2007)

"Pro Nails" is the second single by American hip-hop artist Kid Sister from her debut album Ultraviolet (formerly known as Dream Date). The song is better known for its remix, which features a verse by Kanye West. The single was originally released in 2007 and reissued in 2008.

== Background and release ==
Originally a solo track, Kanye West added a guest verse to the song for his 2007 Can't Tell Me Nothing mixtape. West discovered the song through A-Trak, who had begun dating Kid Sister.

"Pro Nails" was initially released on both 12" vinyl and via the iTunes Store on October 17, 2007. The single featured both the original and remix edits of "Pro Nails" as well as a B-side entitled "Switch Board", produced by Gant-Man. All of Kid Sister's releases were eventually removed from iTunes when she signed a new record deal with Downtown Records in February 2008. In April 2008, a maxi single was released and the song was readded to iTunes as the Super High Shine EP. The single was released in the United Kingdom on July 14, 2008. The Kanye remix was also featured on Fabric Live 38.

The song samples Project Pat's "Good Googly Moogly" (featuring Juicy J and DJ Paul).

== Music video ==
The music video, directed by Ruben Fleischer, uses the remix version and features Kanye West as well as a cameo by A-Trak. Following the theme of the song, a majority of the video takes place within a nail salon. Near the end, the scene relocates to an alley and the song transitions to the b-side "Switchboard." The video was filmed in October 2007, and premiered on mtvU on December 3.

== Track listing ==
- "Pro Nails" – Single
1. "Pro Nails" (Remix feat. Kanye West) – 3:29
2. "Pro Nails" (Remix feat. Kanye West) (Clean) – 3:29
3. "Pro Nails" – 3:29
4. "Pro Nails" (Instrumental) – 3:29
5. "Switch Board" – 2:53
6. "Switch Board" (Instrumental) – 2:53
- "Pro Nails": Super High Shine – EP
1. "Pro Nails" (Remix feat. Kanye West) – 3:29
2. "Pro Nails" (Bag Raiders Remix) – 4:42
3. "Pro Nails" (Gant-Man's Jackin Remix) – 5:39
4. "Pro Nails" (Instrumental) – 3:29
5. "Switch Board" – 2:53

== Charts ==
"Pro Nails" spent two nonconsecutive weeks on Billboard's Hot Singles Sales chart in May 2008, achieving a peak of number twenty-one.

Chart (2008)	Peak position
U.S. Billboard Hot Singles Sales	21
