= Ugly (Fantasia song) =

Promotional single by Fantasia

from the album The Definition Of...
- Released: April 7, 2016
- Recorded: 2014–15
- Studio: Faircraft Studios (Brentwood)
- Genre: Country; pop
- Length: 3:20
- Label: 19 Recordings; RCA
- Songwriters: Audra Mae; Nicolle Galyon
- Producer: Ron Fair

"Ugly" is a song recorded by American singer Fantasia for her fifth studio album, The Definition Of... (2016). It was released by 19 Recordings and RCA Records on April 7, 2016, as a promotional single from the album. Produced by Ron Fair, the song was written by Audra Mae and Nicolle Galyon. A departure from the hip-hop and R&B sound of Fantasia's previous studio albums, the track is a country and pop ballad revolving around body image and female empowerment. Media outlets had varying opinions of the song's genre and its content; Fantasia said that it was inspired by her childhood.

"Ugly" received a mixed response from critics, who were divided over Fantasia's foray into country music. Fantasia performed part of it during the American Idol series finale, which earned positive reviews from media outlets. She also dedicated the song to her daughter Zion during a July 28, 2016, concert broadcast on BET.

== Background and recording ==
While recording her fifth studio album The Definition Of... (2016), Fantasia sought to have more creative control over her music and image. Frustrated with the amount of record label interference in the past, she described executives' plans to determine her sound and style as "prostituting the artist's gift," and wanted to avoid such influences on the album. She attributed her determination to reclaim her career to adjustments she made to her personal life following her 2014 performances in the Broadway musical After Midnight, specifically her choice to spend seven months focusing on her personal well-being and her subsequent marriage to businessman Kendall Taylor.

In an interview with AOL, Fantasia said that she wanted to record a country song to experiment with different musical genres. During its production, The Definition Of... was initially titled Pot of Soup to reflect this choice to explore various styles of music. She included country music as part of "rock soul" a genre she introduced on her previous release Side Effects of You (2013). She defined rock soul as combining the musical styles of Tina Turner, James Brown, and Prince as well as including elements of "jazz, country, gospel, pop and, most important to her, live instrumentation".

"Ugly' was written by Audra Mae and Nicolle Galyon and produced by Ron Fair. Fantasia's vocals were produced and arranged by Fair. They were also engineered by Fair and Pat Thrall at Faircraft Studios in Brentwood, California. The instrumental parts were also recorded and arranged by Fair. Paul Jackson Jr. played the guitar on the track, while the strings were recorded by Steve Genewick.

== Composition and lyrics ==
"Ugly"
The Boombox's Amber McKynzie described "Ugly" as a "country-esque pop ballad. It features a "soulful piano arrangement".

Backed by a "soulful piano arrangement", "Ugly" is a departure from Fantasia's previous output of "bouncy hip-hop singles" and "groovy R&B slow burns". The Boombox's Amber McKynzie referred to the single as a "country-esque pop ballad", while The Guardian's Alex Macpherson called it an "outright country moment". Chris Campbell of the Knoxville News Sentinel said the track was a "piano-based melodrama"; Entertainment Weekly's Chuck Arnold compared the composition to a show tune.

The single's lyrics cover a variety of issues, ranging from "body image, class division, an unhappy marriage and alcoholism". "Ugly" opens with Fantasia narrating a tragic story about a woman with a "picket fence, two-car garage and a man that she don't love". She advocates for female empowerment and explores expectations regarding beauty with lyrics like: "With dirt on my hands and scrapes on my knees/Feeling like nothing can wash it off clean/Tell your girls it's a beautiful thing/Just trust me/It's far from ugly." The lyrics also feature the importance of love, with Fantasia singing: "Thank you for that good good man who loves me." Alex Mcpherson interpreted Fantasia's delivery of the lyric "Give me good food that sticks to my bones" as incorporating gospel elements into the song.

Music critics interpreted the lyrics as encompassing various meanings. Mike Wass wrote that Fantasia provides advice on life through "Ugly". Sarah Grant of Rolling Stone found the single to be a reflection of past struggles - her attempted suicide, an affair with a married man, an abortion, and a battle with depression. Amber McKynzie compared its lyrical content to TLC's 1999 single "Unpretty", and Lauren Craddock of Billboard interpreted the main theme as "embracing the beauty in individuality". When discussing the message behind "Ugly", Fantasia said that she wanted to help someone, and said: "My grandmother taught me that your test will help someone along the way." During an interview with People, she explained that she intended for the track to reach "every young girl out there who's gonna go through everything I went through, and more" as well as older women. Connecting the lyrics with her own childhood, Fantasia said: "I was very insecure growing up, and even though I'm not that girl anymore, I think that the passion, that not feeling pretty and being insecure is where my soul came from. And from early childhood, I let it free onstage."

== Release and promotion ==
"Ugly" was first released when Fantasia uploaded an audio-video to her official Vevo account on April 6, 2017. The following day, she debuted the track live during the American Idol series finale, singing a portion of the single, which Billboard's Michele Amabile Angermiller called a "sneak peek". The song was made available through digital platforms on midnight of the same day. Along with "So Blue" (2016), it was one of two promotional singles made available prior to the album's release.

Fantasia's performance on American Idol earned positive feedback from media outlets. Entertainment Weekly's Justin Kirkland wrote that Fantasia did an "unbelievable performance" of the track. Michael Slezak of TVLine praised her choice to sing a country song as showcasing her ability to be "absolutely transcendent in the genre". Fantasia also sang "Ugly" during a July 28, 2016, concert broadcast on BET, (the first in a series of live concerts on the cable channel). During her performance, she dedicated the song to her daughter Zion.

== Critical reception ==
Critical response was mixed. Alex Mcpherson cited "Ugly" as an example of 2016's R&B/country trend, and praised it for "captur[ing] the emotional blood and guts at the core of both genres". Sarah Grant described the single as "one of the more evocative songs on the album", and Michael Slezak commended its hook as the catchiest in Fantasia's music catalog. Between the Lines' Chris Azzopardi wrote that the song was a "welcome country detour", though AllMusic's Andy Kellman panned it as a "contemporary country number seemingly written by an algorithm". Wass panned the lyrics as "veer[ing] dangerously close to schmaltz", though he felt the hook had potential for strong crossover appeal. He viewed it as an improvement over Fantasia's previous single "No Time for It" (2016).

== Track listing ==
Digital download
No.	Title	Length
1.	"Ugly"	3:20

== Credits and personnel ==
Credits adapted from the liner notes of The Definition Of... , 19 Recordings, RCA.

Management

- Rock Soul Records/19 Recordings
- Limited/RCA Records

Recording locations

- Music recording – Faircraft Studios (Brentwood)

Personnel

- Arranged By, Arranged By [Strings], Arranged By [Vocals], Bass, Harmonica, Conductor, Conductor [Strings], Percussion, Piano, Producer – Ron Fair
- Backing Vocals, Vocals – Fantasia
- Engineer [Recording] – Pat Thrall, Ron Fair
- Guitar – Paul Jackson, Jr.
- Recorded By [Strings] – Steve Genewick
- Written By – Audra Mae, Nicolle Galyon

== Release history ==
Country	Date	Format	Label
Worldwide	April 7, 2016	Digital download	RCA; 19
