= No Time for It =

Single by Fantasia

from the album The Definition Of...
- Released: January 7, 2016
- Recorded: 2014–15
- Studio: Kennedy Compound (Hollywood) and Faircraft Studios (Brentwood)
- Genre: R&B; soul; pop
- Length: 3:15
- Label: 19 Recordings; RCA
- Songwriters: Paris "PJ" Jones; Lance Eric Shipp; Brian Kennedy
- Producer: Brian Kennedy

Fantasia singles chronology
"If We Had Your Eyes" (2013)	"No Time for It" (2016)	"Sleeping with the One I Love" (2016)

"No Time for It" is a song recorded by the American singer Fantasia for her fifth studio album, The Definition Of... (2016). It was released on January 7, 2016, as the album's lead single. Brian Kennedy produced the track and co-wrote it along with Paris Jones and Lance Eric Shipp. With a synths, snares and organ backing, the mid-tempo song's lyrics center on blocking out drama and negativity in favor of professional and financial success. Fantasia described it as a continuation of the "rock soul" sound she introduced on her previous album, Side Effects of You (2013).

Critical response to "No Time for It" was mixed. Some critics praised its sound and composition; others criticized the single as too safe, its production as resembling album filler, and Fantasia's vocal as subdued and restrained compared with her live performances. The song peaked at number six on the United States Billboard Adult R&B Songs chart. To promote it, Fantasia released a lyric video on February 4, 2016 and included it on the set list for Fantasia & Anthony Hamilton: Live in Concert.

Although a music video was filmed for the song's original version, Fantasia cancelled its release when she was dissatisfied with the final product. "No Time for It" was chosen by her label as the album's first single, despite the singer pushing for "Sleeping with the One I Love". On March 24, Fantasia released an acoustic version of the song, in which she is accompanied by a guitar and xylophone, as a black-and-white music video. Critics praised the arrangement of the acoustic version and the simplicity of its video.

== Concept and recording ==
During a 2014 interview with Billboard, Fantasia explained that her fifth studio album The Definition Of... (2016) would expand on the "rock soul" sound that she introduced on her previous release Side Effects of You (2013). She defined "rock soul" as encompassing multiple genres, explaining it as an attempt to combine her soulful childhood singing in church with "a certain side of [her] that wants to tap into that whole rock world". She explained on Instagram that the title and lyrics for "No Time for It" were influenced by her beliefs: "There are some things in life that I simply have 'No Time for It'". In an interview with Essence, she followed this up by saying: "No time for family drama. If you’re gonna be my friend, come in and be strong. I can’t cater to you, I can’t always let you borrow, borrow, borrow if you can’t give me nothing [laughs]!"

"No Time for It" was written by Lance Eric Shipp and Paris Jones in collaboration with its producer Brian Kennedy. The instrumental parts were recorded by Thomas Carillo at the Kennedy Compound in Hollywood. Fantasia's vocals, produced and arranged by Ron Fair, were engineered by Fair and Pat Thrall at Faircraft Studios in Brentwood, California. Shipp provided additional vocal production, with keyboards and programming by Kennedy and Greg Davis. Fantasia described the recording process for the single, and the album as a whole, as entailing a large amount of personal sacrifice and serving as her opportunity to "open the door to a new chapter of life".

== Composition and lyrics ==
"No Time for It"
A 21-second sample of the song. Music critics noted that Fantasia's vocals were restrained in comparison to her past singles and live performances.

The three-minute, 26-second pop, R&B and soul song was written in common time in the key of D-flat major with a slow tempo of 135 beats per minute. According to Latoya Cross of Jet, the song has a "smooth tempo" and is a continuation of Fantasia's "rock soul" vibe. Its instrumentation is "a polished, percolating mix of synths and trappy snares", including an organ. Elias Leight of Vogue described the song as an "iconoclast" with a "de rigueur quiver of programmed hi-hats" and a "wormy synth melody and bass line" which could appeal to listeners of hip hop music.

In "No Time for It", Fantasia sings about blocking out drama and negativity. Samantha Callender of The Source wrote that its lyrics are a list of "all the things Fantasia has no time for (basically everything except money)". In the chorus, "You wanna tell me how it is, but there’s no time for it / You wanna tell me how you feel, but there's no time for it"; Fantasia sings in "a cool collected manner", contrasting with her biting lyrics. Idolator's Mike Wass described the song as a "catchy mid-tempo anthem" and its lyrics, such as "Bitch, no time for the haters tripping", as exemplifying that "Fantasia has always been the realest".

According to Time's Maura Johnston, the song's lyrics are a "kiss-off" and "a salvo aimed right at any gossipmongers who fill their hours with loose talk". Ariana Gordon wrote on the Music Times website that the lyrics reflected Fantasia's attempt to move beyond her past struggles (her attempted suicide, an affair with a married man, a home foreclosure, and toxic relationships with family members) and piece together her personal and professional lives.

== Release and promotion ==
On January 6, 2016, Fantasia announced on Instagram that "No Time for It" would be the lead single from The Definition Of... and unveiled its cover: "This month my new single will be born and I’m speaking nothing but the truth". The following day, the song premiered on Fantasia’s Vevo channel, and explicit and clean versions were digitally released at the iTunes Store. It was Fantasia's first release after joining Primary Wave Music. According to the singer, "No Time for It" was chosen by her label as the album's first single. She was initially hesitant about releasing the song ("At first I was thinking, 'Is that a record to come back with?'"), but she later said that it "set the atmosphere" for her future singles. Fantasia was critical of the single, describing it as a "very cute record", but felt connected to its message. She had favored "Sleeping with the One I Love" (2016) as the album's lead single. She clarified that she did not record anything without feeling a personal connection, describing the album's recording process was all about "artistic fulfillment".

On February 4, Fantasia released a lyric video for the song. Although a music video was filmed to promote the single, she was dissatisfied with the final product and refused to release it. A music video of an acoustic version of "No Time for It" premiered on Fantasia's Vevo on March 24; the following day, it was released on the iTunes Store. The black-and-white video features Fantasia wearing a short, black leather dress while backed by a guitar and xylophone. It received positive comments from critics. A Rap-Up reviewer praised the version as "a stirring acoustic rendition of her empowering song", and Fantasia "breaks it all the way down" in the video. B. Cakes of Soulbounce.com called the video personal and intimate, "a candid woman-to-woman (or woman-to-man) talk with one of her detractors", and praised the acoustic remix as keeping the focus on its lyrics.

The original version of "No Time for It" was included on the set list for the Fantasia & Anthony Hamilton: Live in Concert tour, and Fantasia performed it as part of a medley with her 2005 single "Free Yourself" during a July 28, 2016 concert broadcast on BET, (the first in a series of live concerts on the cable channel).

== Reception ==
"No Time for It" received a mixed response from music critics upon its release. Jeff Benjamin of Fuse called it a "lush kiss-off track". Benjamin described it as embodying the "same feisty attitude we know and love Tasia for" and felt it showed promise for the parent album. "No Time for It" was identified as a sign of an R&B revival by reviewers from the Omaha World-Herald and Essence. A writer from the Omaha World-Herald concluded by praising Fantasia for her "powerful, soulful vocals". Maura Johnston included the song on her "Best Songs of 2016 So Far" list. Reviewing the album for the Knoxville News Sentinel, Chuck Campbell praised "No Time for It" as "smoothly arranged and spiked with her vocals" and suggested it as an answer for listeners "tired of all life's drama".

Some commentators were more critical of the song's production and Fantasia's vocals. On the nationally syndicated Rickey Smiley Morning Show, host Rickey Smiley criticized it as "more of a filler record that you have on while you're cleaning the house or washing dishes". He said that the singer lacked the vocal acrobatics of her performance of "Superwoman" (1989) at the 2015 Soul Train Music Awards. According to Mike Wass, "No Time for It" did not command attention on the first hearing and lacked the pop hooks of the album track "Ugly". Kevin Apaza of Direct Lyrics criticized the song as safe and predictable, called its production dated, and felt that Fantasia was "sleeping on her laurels". Apaza suggested that Fantasia or RCA release a remix with Kelly Rowland or another female R&B singer to "prevent this single [from] fall[ing] quick into oblivion". In Entertainment Weekly, Chuck Arnold criticized "No Time for It" for "gloss[ing] over the grit of Fantasia's voice" and cited it as an example of the album's uneven sound.

During the week of January 30, 2010, "No Time for It" debuted on the United States' Adult R&B Songs Billboard chart at number 24. It peaked at number six the week of April 16, after eight weeks on the chart, and remained in the top twenty until the week of July 9. It was Fantasia 10th top-ten entry, and the first of the album's two top-twenty singles; "Sleeping with the One I Love" was the second.

== Track listings ==
Digital download
No.	Title	Length
1.	"No Time for It"	3:15

Digital download
No.	Title	Length
1.	"No Time for It (Acoustic Version)" (Music Video)	3:40

== Credits and personnel ==
Credits adapted from the liner notes of The Definition Of... , 19 Recordings, RCA.

Management

- ASCAP/Artist Publishing Group West
- ASCAP/BMG Gold Songs
- ASCAP/Golden Waffles
- ASCAP/Kennedy Klassiks Music

Recording locations

- Music recording –Kennedy Compound (Hollywood); Faircraft Studios (Brentwood)

Personnel

- Songwriting – Brian Kennedy, Lance Eric Shipp, Paris "PJ" Jones
- Production – Brian Kennedy
- Vocal production and arrangement – Ron Fair
- Additional production – Lance Eric Shipp
- Keyboards and programming – Brian Kennedy and Greg Davis
- Music recording – Thomas Carillo
- Vocal engineering – Ron Fair and Pat Thrall

== Charts ==
Chart (2016)	Peak position
US Adult R&B Songs (Billboard)	6

== Release history ==
Region	Format	Date	Label
Worldwide	Digital download	January 7, 2016	19; RCA
