= Control (Kid Sister song) =

Single by Kid Sister

from the album Ultraviolet
- B-side: "Damn Girl"
- Released: 2007
- Genre: Hip-hop, electro
- Length: 2:52
- Label: Fool's Gold
- Songwriters: Melisa Young, Alex Epton
- Producer: XXXchange

Kid Sister singles chronology
"Control" (2007)	"Pro Nails" (2007)

"Control" is the debut single by American hip-hop artist Kid Sister from her album Ultraviolet. The song was released via Fool's Gold Records in 2007 and is included in the Android operating system for mobile devices.

== Background and release ==
"Control" was co-written and produced by Alex Epton, better known as Spank Rock's XXXchange. The b-side "Damn Girl" was produced by A-Trak, with a Gant-Man remix also included. Flosstradamus later remixed the song. The single was released in 2007 on a 12" vinyl and also via the iTunes Store. The EP was later removed when Kid Sister signed her record deal with Downtown Records in February 2008. "Control" features on the compilation Juice!, Vol. 1.

== Track listing ==
- "Control" - EP
1. "Control" (Dirty) – 2:52
2. "Control" (Clean) – 3:29
3. "Control" (Instrumental) – 3:29
4. "Damn Girl" (DJ Gant-Man's Juke Remix) – 3:29
5. "Damn Girl" (Dirty) – 2:53
6. "Damn Girl" (Instrumental) – 2:53
7. "Damn Girl" (Scratchapella) – 2:53
