= Beeper (song) =

Single by the Count & Sinden featuring Kid Sister
- B-side: "Stinging Nettle"
- Released: 7 July 2008
- Genre: Speed garage; bassline
- Length: 3:05
- Label: Domino
- Songwriters: The Count & Sinden
- Producers: The Count & Sinden

The Count & Sinden singles chronology
"Beeper" (2008)	"Hardcore Girls" (2008)

Kid Sister singles chronology
"Pro Nails" (2007)	"Beeper" (2008)	"Right Hand Hi" (2008)

"Beeper" is the debut single by British music duo the Count & Sinden, featuring vocals from American hip-hop artist Kid Sister. The song was released via Domino Records in April 2008.

== Background and release ==
"Beeper" was released on Switch and Sinden's record label Counterfeet. "Beeper" was re-released through Domino Records with vocals from Kid Sister. It featured an exclusive instrumental B-side, "Stinging Nettle".

The track samples elements of Pharrell Williams' verse from Fam-Lay's "Hit Me on My Beeper".

The music video was directed by Joey Garfield and Joey Patel for Ghost Robot. The clip was filmed in Kid Sister's hometown of Chicago. The video premiered on 21 February 2008.

The track was featured during the "Showboat" segment on British Saturday-morning football show Soccer AM.

== Commercial performance ==
"Beeper" debuted on the UK Singles Chart at number 99 in the final week of March 2008. It rose ten places the next week, before spending one week in the top 75 at number 69. It also reached number one on the UK Dance Singles Chart for one week.

== Track listing ==
- UK 2-track
1. "Beeper"
2. "Stinging Nettle"
- UK maxi
1. "Beeper" (Sunship Vocal Mix)
2. "Beeper" (Fake Blood Remix)
3. "Beeper" (A-Trak Remix)
4. "Beeper" (RedSoul Remix)
5. "Beeper" (The Qemists Remix)
6. "Beeper" (Jonny L Remix)
- UK 12" vinyl
1. "Beeper"
2. "Beeper" (Fake Blood Remix)
3. "Beeper" (RedSoul Remix)
4. "Beeper" (Sunship Vocal Mix)
5. "Beeper" (A-Trak Remix)
- US iTunes single
1. "Beeper" – 3:05

== Charts ==
Chart performance for "Beeper"
Chart (2008)	Peak position
Australia Physical Singles (ARIA)	50
UK Singles (Official Charts)	69
UK Dance (Official Charts)	1
