= Daydreaming (Kid Sister song) =

Single by Kid Sister featuring Cee-Lo

from the album Ultraviolet
- Released: 16 April 2010
- Genre: Hip-hop, electro, R&B
- Length: 3:10 (radio edit)
- Label: Asylum Records
- Songwriters: M. Young, M. McHenry, J. Baptiste, A. Whyte, B. Kennedy Seals
- Producer: Brian Kennedy

Kid Sister singles chronology
"Right Hand Hi" (2009)	"Daydreaming" (2010)	"Big N Bad" (2010)

Music video
- "Daydreaming" on YouTube

"Daydreaming" is the fifth single from Kid Sister's debut studio album Ultraviolet. The song features uncredited vocals from Cee Lo Green (known then as Cee-Lo).

== Track listing ==
"Daydreaming" - EP
No.	Title	Length
1.	"Daydreaming" (Radio Edit)	3:10
2.	"Daydreaming" (Jakwob Remix)	4:37
3.	"Daydreaming" (Style of Eye Remix)	7:09
4.	"Daydreaming" (Douster Remix)	4:52
5.	"Daydreaming" (Redlight Remix)	4:24

== Charts ==
Chart (2010)	Peak position
UK Singles Chart	132
UK Dance Chart	14
