= I Made It (Fantasia song) =

Song by Fantasia featuring Tye Tribbett

from the album The Definition Of...
- Released: July 29, 2016
- Recorded: 2014–15
- Studio: LLC/Motown Gospel Studio (Brentwood, Los Angeles, California)
- Genre: Gospel
- Length: 5:40
- Label: 19 Recordings; RCA
- Songwriters: Tye Tribbett; David Outing
- Producers: Tye Tribbett; David Outing

"I Made It" is a song recorded by American singer Fantasia, featuring American singer-songwriter Tye Tribbett. It was written and produced by Tribbett and David Outing for Fantasia's fifth studio album, The Definition Of... (2016). Tribett developed it in collaboration with Fantasia, blending her personal testimony and his experiences with God into the lyrics. Fantasia described it as a highly personal song, explaining that it was about refusing to let people control her and moving forward from her past struggles. "I Made It" is an uptempo gospel record and its lyrics revolve around an appreciation for God and faith.

"I Made It" received generally positive reviews from music critics who praised its composition and Fantasia's performance. The song was nominated for the Dr. Bobby Jones Best Gospel/Inspirational Award in the BET Awards 2017, but lost Lecrae's 2016 song "Can't Stop Me Now (Destination)". It peaked at number 15 on the Billboard Gospel Airplay chart. Fantasia promoted "I Made It" on Good Morning America and Tribbett's show Joyful Noise, and the performances were met with positive feedback.

== Concept and development ==
Tye Tribbett and David Outing wrote and produced "I Made It" for Fantasia's fifth studio album, The Definition Of... (2016). Prior to the album's release, Fantasia previewed the song on Periscope; in the video, she incorrectly reported that she handled the songwriting by herself. Tribbett explained his collaboration with Fantasia to The Christian Post, saying: "We've been talking about working together for a minute. So when the opportunity came it was kind of like a no brainer". He said that he instantly agreed to work with Fantasia after receiving a phone call to write a song for her album. Fantasia had contacted Tribbett at the suggestion of music executive Ron Fair.

Prior to the writing process, Tribbett had requested to "do it on [his] terms" and "maintain the integrity of his message" by creating an inspirational gospel record. He used Fantasia's testimony, as well as his own experiences with God, as inspiration for the lyrics. He described "I Made It" as the result of a close connection between Fantasia and himself: "I basically just combined testimonies between her and myself when I wrote the song and it resonated so richly with her, her audience and with everybody." Fantasia said that she "was able to release everything I was carrying" through the song. She recorded "I Made It" at the Motown Gospel Studio in Brentwood, Los Angeles. Tribbett appeared on the song courtesy of Tye Tribbett Worldwide, LLC and Motown Gospel. Fantasia's vocals were arranged by Tribbett and Fair and engineered by Fair and Pat Thrall at the Record Plant in Los Angeles. Fair and Dan Higgins handled the horns and strings, where were engineered by Frank Wolf.

== Composition and lyrics ==
"I Made It"
A 20-second sample of the song, where Fantasia sings the opening lyrics, and is believed by The Boombox to showcase the singer's ability to "bare it all: everything she’s gone through from childhood to now".

"I Made It" is a gospel song that lasts five-minute, 40-second. Instrumentation is provided by piano, organ, vibraphone, glockenspiel, harmonica, and a guitar. They were played by Tribbett, Fair, Paul Jackson, Jr., and Frank Brunot.

Fantasia told Us Weekly that the lyrics revolve around "how I don't let people talk about me like they used to [and] I control how I feel". She said the song was based on her attempted suicide and demanding relationships with her family. During an interview with Rolling Stone, Fantasia said the following about its message: "I wanted people to know that I've been through the rain, I've been broken into pieces, I had a daughter at such a young age. There were times people would say, 'That's it for her,' but that didn't happen." Rito P. Asilo of the Philippine Daily Inquirer wrote that "I Made It" represents how Fantasia has reconciled with her feelings of "heartbreak, betrayal, and the character-forming pain of rejection and failure".

"I Made It" opens with Fantasia's testimony: "Listen, I done made it through the storm and the rain / So much heartache, pressure, so much pain / I been broken in two pieces, maybe more / And some nights I made my bed right on the floor." The lyrics contain direct references to Christianity, which includes Fantasia singing: "Thank you for never leaving me Lord Jesus!". She expresses her gratitude through the lyrics: "You're the only one that never left me when everyone else just didn't care, you're the only one that really loved me. I made it. I made it through the storm." She describes having a close relationship with God and her faith by singing: "I got to say thank you Lord for keeping me, for grace and mercy. I thank you, because I made it!" According to Devin Lazerine of Rap-Up, Fantasia "triumphantly" expresses the song's message through her vocals on lyrics such as "I made it I made it, y’all! Still standing."

== Reception ==
The critical response to "I Made It" was largely positive. It received a nomination for the Dr. Bobby Jones Best Gospel/Inspirational Award in the BET Awards 2017, losing to Lecrae's 2016 song "Can't Stop Me Now (Destination)". The Boombox's Amber McKynzie praised Fantasia for sharing her life experiences through the song, and Christian Today's Czarina Ong described "I Made It" as a "victory song" and a "song of success". As part of their album review, an EEWMagazineOnline contributor wrote that the song represents how Fantasia has become: "[a] defiant and determined singer [who] is now playing by her own rules and refusing to be defined by the times, others' expectations, or genres". Citing it as an album highlight, Chuck Arnold of Entertainment Weekly commended the track as a "spiritual turn-up". He wrote that it sounds like a closing number for the musical The Color Purple, and cited it as a reason Fantasia should further pursue gospel music. On the other hand, AllMusic's Andy Kellman criticized "I Made It" as an example of the album's uneven sound.

"I Made It" debuted at number 29 on the Billboard Gospel Airplay chart on September 10, 2016. It reached a peak position of number 15 on the Billboard Gospel Airplay chart, and remained on the charts for 24 consecutive weeks.

== Live performances ==
Fantasia promoted "I Made It" through live performances. She first performed it during the first in a series of live concerts Broadcast by the cable TV channel BET on July 28. Billboard's Lauren Craddock praised Fantasia for "embrac[ing] her gospel background". Fantasia sang "I Made It" on Good Morning America on July 25, 2016. Tribbett praised the performance on his Instagram account, writing: "What an honor to bring glory to GOD on such a platform." Reviewers from Rap-Up and EEWMagazineOnline wrote that Fantasia was "powerful" and "outstanding". On October 16, 2016, Fantasia performed the song for the first time live with Tribbett on his BET gospel music show Joyful Noise. A preview was released through BET four days prior to the broadcast. Christine Thomasos of The Christian Post praised Fantasia and Tribbett's performance as a "powerful duet".

== Credits and personnel ==
Credits adapted from the liner notes of The Definition Of... , 19 Recordings, RCA.

Management

- ASCAP/Everything Fresh Entertainment
- BMI/DO3 Productions
- Tye Tribbett appears courtesy of Tye Tribbett Worldwide, LLC/Motown Gospel

Recording locations

- Recorded at LLC/Motown Gospel Studio (Brentwood)
- Engineered at Record Plant (Los Angeles)

Personnel

- Songwriting –Tye Tribbett, David Outing
- Production –Tye Tribbett, David Outing
- Vocal arrangement –Tye Tribbett, Ron Fair
- Piano –Tye Tribbett
- Organ, Vibes, Glockenspiel, Harmonica & Additional Piano –Ron Fair
- Guitar –Paul Jackson, Jr.
- Bass guitar –Frank Brunot
- Strings arranged & conducted by –Ron Fair
- Horns arranged by –Dan Higgins
- Choirmaster –Tim Davis
- Vocal engineer –Ron Fair, Pat Thrall
- Strings & horns engineered by –Frank Wolf

== Charts ==
Chart (2016–2017)	Peak position
US Gospel Airplay (Billboard)	15
