= When I Met You (Fantasia song) =

Single by Fantasia

from the album The Definition Of...
- Released: January 17, 2017
- Recorded: 2014–15
- Genre: R&B; pop
- Length: 4:33
- Label: 19 Recordings; RCA
- Songwriters: Priscilla Hamilton; Ron Feemster
- Producers: Priscilla Hamilton; Ron Feemster; Ron Fair

Fantasia singles chronology
"Sleeping with the One I Love" (2016)	"When I Met You" (2017)	"Enough" (2019)

"When I Met You" is a song recorded by American singer Fantasia for her fifth studio album, The Definition Of... (2016). It was released on January 17, 2017, as the album's third single. "When I Met You" was written by Priscilla Hamilton and Ron Feemster, who produced the track with Ron Fair. RCA executives had originally wanted to release it as the second single from The Definition Of.... Fantasia preferred "Sleeping with the One I Love" (2016) and convinced the record label to release it as the second single instead after surveying listeners during various radio interviews.

Backed by bass, harmonica, and an organ, the mid-tempo, R&B and pop song's lyrics focus on finding love again in the wake of past heartbreak. It was inspired by Fantasia's relationship with husband Kendall Taylor. Music critics responded positively to "When I Met You", praising Fantasia's vocal performance and influences incorporated from earlier R&B artists. The single peaked at number 18 on the Adult R&B Airplay Billboard chart.

Directed by Derek Blanks, the single's accompanying music video features Fantasia's daughter Zion, who plays a younger version of her mother; husband Kendall Taylor and Kairo Whitfield, son of The Real Housewives of Atlanta cast member Shereé Whitfield, also appear in the video as Fantasia's love interests. The 1990s-inspired music video follows Fantasia as she develops a crush on a classmate before maturing and ultimately marrying her childhood friend instead. The music video received positive reviews from critics, who found it appropriate for Valentine's Day.

== Production and release ==
"When I Met You" was written by Priscilla Hamilton and Ron Feemster, who produced the track with Ron Fair. Paul Jackson Jr. played guitar on the track, while Feemster played the organ and programmed the drums. Fair, who played the bass, harmonica, and piano, also arranged and produced Fantasia's vocals while acting as the conductor of the string section. The single was engineered by Fair and Pat Thrall, with strings supplied by Steve Genewick. Peter Mokran mixed the vocals, assisted by Chandler Harrod.

RCA executives had originally intended to release "When I Met You" as the second single from Fantasia's fifth studio album, The Definition Of... (2016). Fantasia disagreed with the label's decision, preferring to release the song "Sleeping with the One I Love" instead. She proceeded to conduct polls during a series of radio interviews, asking listeners to choose which track they wanted to be released. Ultimately, they voted for "Sleeping with the One I Love", which was released as the second single instead of "When I Met You". "When I Met You" became the album's third and last single, and was sent to urban adult contemporary radio stations on January 17, 2017.

== Composition and lyrics ==
"When I Met You"
A sample of the song, which features a spoken word portion on Fantasia's first meeting with her husband; the track is backed by "snap-cadences and strings".

An R&B and pop song, "When I Met You" is a mid-tempo, ballad that is four minutes and 33 seconds in length. It is composed in the key of C-sharp minor and has a tempo of 80 beats per minute. The track was described as "reflective" by a writer from Rap-Up and Homorazzi.com's Donovan. Its instrumentation includes "snap-cadences and strings". PopCrush's Matthew Scott Donnelly identified the single as an "early '90s benevolent R&B-pop" song that reveals "how a relationship restored [Fantasia's] sense of self".

The song's lyrics revolve around the pursuit of love, functioning as an ode to Fantasia's husband Kendall Taylor. Throughout the single, Fantasia reveals her personal "journey to happiness" by singing, "When I met you, I met me too." She also shares memories of her past heartbreaks using lyrics such as: “Listen to me when I tell you/Without him there would be no you/So yes, I thank my ex a little still." The song ends with a spoken word monologue, in which Fantasia details the first time she met Taylor. This part of the track includes lines such as: "I still remember the day, it was beautiful. And if I hadn’t went through the things I went through before then I wouldn’t know how special you are."

== Reception ==
"When I Met You" received positive reviews from music critics. The track was selected as one of the highlights from The Definition Of... by a reviewer for the music website You Know I Got Soul, who praised Fantasia's vocals and her how she blended in influences from legendary R&B artists. While discussing the music video, the writer described the song as "showcas[ing] just why Fantasia is one of [R&B]’s elite artists" and felt it would appeal to fans of R&B music. The Boombox's Amber McKynzie commended Fantasia for "bring[ing] the definition of love to life with this jubilant ballad". Matthew Scott Donnelly of PopCrush recommended "When I Met You" to fans of Fantasia's 2004 song "Truth Is".

"When I Met You" debuted at number 24 on the Adult R&B Airplay Billboard chart on February 18, 2017. It peaked at number 18, and remained on the chart for 13 weeks.

== Music video ==
=== Background and casting ===
The music video for "When I Met You", directed by American photographer Derek Blanks, was filmed on Christmas Day 2016, around the same time Fantasia and Taylor renewed their wedding vows. On December 6, 2016, Fantasia released a behind-the-scenes video documenting the making of the music video on her official Facebook page.

The music video was released on January 27, 2017, and stars Fantasia's daughter Zion as a younger version of herself and Taylor as her primary love interest. The protagonist's secondary love interest is played by Kairo Whitfield, the son of The Real Housewives of Atlanta cast member Shereé Whitfield. Fantasia said that the video was inspired by "that '90s throwback vibe," referring to that period as "[a] true era of music". She also identified her character's role in the video as someone who is "blinded by a false idea of love". A writer from Rap-Up summarized the video as "the story of romance through the years, from puppy love to marriage".

=== Synopsis and reception ===
The video begins with a short sample of Fantasia's song "Crazy", another track from The Definition Of..., accompanied by images from a high school yearbook. A teenage Fantasia is introduced discussing love with her friends while having a party in her bedroom. She develops a crush on a classmate, while rejecting the romantic advances from other men. Following a time jump, Fantasia leaves her boyfriend after discovering that he has been cheating on her with another woman. Close-up images of singers Whitney Houston and Aretha Franklin, and girl groups SWV and TLC are used throughout the video. The adult version of Fantasia is costumed in 1990s fashion, such as hoop earrings, a choker, and a plaid shirt, as well as a hairstyle reminiscent of American singer T-Boz. Fantasia's clothing and hair are stylized after "a mix of TLC meets Jade". Following the break-up, Fantasia forms a relationship with her childhood male friend. After another time lapse, the video ends with Fantasia marrying her partner in a wedding ceremony.

Critical response to the video was positive. A writer from Singersroom praised it as a "tear jerker", describing it as a "throwback music video" that was appropriate for Valentine's Day. Echoing Singersroom, a writer from SoulBounce called it "a lovey dovey music video right in time for Valentine's Day". She wrote that the visual was "a family affair that will give you all the feels," saying that "it's great to get a glimpse at [Fantasia's] happily ever after". Anthony Chocolate from WDAS-FM called the video "romantic," and Donovan felt that it was "an equally touching affair". Donovan also enjoyed the casting of Zion and Taylor, believing that they "g[ave] the video some authenticity".

== Credits and personnel ==
Credits adapted from the liner notes of The Definition Of... , 19 Recordings, RCA.

Personnel

- Arranged By [Strings], Bass, Conductor [Strings], Harmonica, Piano, Producer [Vocals] – Ron Fair
- Arranged By [Vocals] – Priscilla "Priscilla Renea" Hamilton, Ron Fair
- Drum Programming, Organ – Ron "NEFF-U" Feemster
- Engineer [Recording] – Pat Thrall, Ron Fair
- Engineer [Strings] – Steve Genewick
- Guitar – Paul Jackson, Jr.
- Producer – Priscilla "Priscilla Renea" Hamilton, Ron "NEFF-U" Feemster, Ron Fair
- Written by – Priscilla "Priscilla Renea" Hamilton, Ron Feemster

== Charts ==
Chart (2017)	Peak position
US Adult R&B Airplay (Billboard)	18
