= What It Is (Block Boy) =

2023 single by Doechii featuring Kodak Black

Single by Doechii featuring Kodak Black
- Released: March 17, 2023
- Length: 3:43; 3:09 (solo version)
- Label: Top Dawg; Capitol
- Composers: Anthony White; Brian Kennedy; Lawrence Edwards; Jamal Glaze; Donnell Prince; LaMarquis Jefferson; Craig Love; Jonathan Smith; Kevin Briggs; Kandi Burruss; Tameka Cottle; Maurice Simmonds
- Lyricists: Jaylah Hickmon; Bill Kapri; Akil King; Bianca Atterberry
- Producers: J. White Did It; Kennedy

Doechii singles chronology
"Girls Night Out" (2022)	"What It Is (Block Boy)" (2023)	"Booty Drop" (2023)

Kodak Black singles chronology
"King Snipe" (2023)	"What It Is (Block Boy)" (2023)	"I Remember" (2023)

Music video
- "What It Is (Block Boy)" on YouTube

"What It Is (Block Boy)" is a song by American rapper and singer Doechii, released by Top Dawg Entertainment and Capitol Records on March 17, 2023, as a non-album single. The original features American rapper Kodak Black, but a solo version, without Black, was released simultaneously. Six variations of the track were released, which include sped-up and slowed-down versions. Produced by J. White Did It and Brian Kennedy, it is Doechii's first single to enter the Billboard Hot 100, peaking at number 29, and also her first top-40. It also reached the top 10 in Malaysia and the Philippines.

== Composition ==
"What It Is"
A 28-second of sample of "What It Is (Block Boy)" by Doechii.

Songwriter Bianca Atterberry has stated that the song was originally intended for Normani's debut album Dopamine. Atterberry, Verse Simmonds, Fresh, and J. White Did It produced six songs, including "What It Is", after a three-day studio session commissioned by RCA. However, Normani did not think the song fit her vision for the record. The song was then recorded by Doechii "a couple of years" later.

In regard to the song, Doechii said:

This song is a fusion of nostalgia and pop vibes. I feel like I'm showing off a side of my vocal range with this one that my fans haven't really seen yet. I love using the old samples of "No Scrubs" and "Some Cut" to mix in some playful energy as well.

In the chorus, Doechii interpolates the melodic hook of "Some Cut" by Trillville with her own lyrics:

What it is, hoe?
What's up?
Every good girl needs a little thug
Every block boy needs a little love
If you put it down, I'ma pick it up

As a female artist, she flips the script that originated with the male hip-hop trio. It basically starts the conversation between the "hoe" and the "block boy". Using an interpolation of "No Scrubs" by TLC, she details her love for "block boys", describing their street credibility and considering them for an ideal relationship. Kodak Black's verse is from the perspective of a man that Doechii is looking for, expressing his own needs from his lover.

Sheet music for "What It Is (Block Boy)" is in the key of C-sharp minor with a metronome of 88-92 beats per minute.

== Music video ==
The music video was released alongside the single. It shows Doechii dancing and strutting in chaps, while Kodak Black plays her love interest.

== Critical reception ==
Aron A. of HotNewHipHop gave a positive review, writing that "Doechii's sugary hook and lustful verses lay down the tone with infectious lyrics" and regarding Kodak Black's performance, "Though the pairing is unexpected, Yak continues to prove that, beyond his controversies, his talents are undeniable, even if his attempts to reach Drake-level Billboard records seem like a far-reach." D-Money of Soul Bounce, while also praising the song, responded unfavorably to his feature: "Kodak Black steps in to represent the block boy, though his addition isn't necessarily needed here. The song's energy takes a slump with his arrival and inability to truly ride the beat. Thankfully, there's a solo version without him there to drag things down." Bianca Betancourt of Harpers Bazaar stated, "While the samples are recognizable, they're not lazily executed, and while the lyrics are memorable, they're not vapid."

== Accolades ==
Awards and nominations for "What It Is (Block Boy)"
Year	Organization	Award	Result	Ref.
2023	MTV Video Music Awards	Song of Summer	Nominated	

== Track listing ==
Versions EP

1. "What It Is (Block Boy)" (featuring Kodak Black) – 3:43
2. "What It Is (Block Boy)" (solo version) – 3:10
3. "What It Is (Block Boy)" (solo version; sped up) – 2:44
4. "What It Is (Block Boy)" (solo version; slowed down) – 3:29
5. "What It Is (Block Boy)" (featuring Kodak Black; sped up) – 3:13
6. "What It Is (Block Boy)" (featuring Kodak Black; slowed down) – 4:10

== Charts ==
=== Weekly charts ===
Weekly chart performance for "What It Is (Block Boy)"
Chart (2023–2024)	Peak position
Australia (ARIA)	100
Canada Hot 100 (Billboard)	31
Canada CHR/Top 40 (Billboard)	1
Canada Hot AC (Billboard)	33
Global 200 (Billboard)	77
Hungary (Single Top 40)	40
Indonesia (Billboard)	18
Ireland (IRMA)	95
Malaysia (Billboard)	10
Netherlands (Single Tip)	5
New Zealand (Recorded Music NZ)	13
Philippines (Billboard)	7
Singapore (RIAS)	22
Suriname (Nationale Top 40)	2
Turkey (Radiomonitor Türkiye)	6
UK Singles (OCC)	63
US Billboard Hot 100	29
US Adult Pop Airplay (Billboard)	34
US Dance/Mix Show Airplay (Billboard)	20
US Hot R&B/Hip-Hop Songs (Billboard)	8
US Pop Airplay (Billboard)	3
US R&B/Hip-Hop Airplay (Billboard)	16
US Rhythmic Airplay (Billboard)	1
Vietnam (Vietnam Hot 100)	58

=== Year-end charts ===
2023 year-end chart performance for "What It Is (Block Boy)"
Chart (2023)	Position
Canada (Canadian Hot 100)	82
Global 200 (Billboard)	193
US Billboard Hot 100	76
US Hot R&B/Hip-Hop Songs (Billboard)	24
US Mainstream Top 40 (Billboard)	38
US Rhythmic (Billboard)	9

2024 year-end chart performance for "What It Is (Block Boy)"
Chart (2024)	Position
US Hot R&B/Hip-Hop Songs (Billboard)	76
US Mainstream Top 40 (Billboard)	24

== Certifications ==
Certifications for "What It Is (Block Boy)"
Region	Certification	Certified units/sales
Australia (ARIA)	Platinum	70,000^{‡}
Brazil (Pro-Música Brasil)	3× Platinum	120,000^{‡}
Canada (Music Canada)	3× Platinum	240,000^{‡}
New Zealand (RMNZ)	2× Platinum	60,000^{‡}
Poland (ZPAV)	Gold	25,000^{‡}
United Kingdom (BPI)	Silver	200,000^{‡}
United States (RIAA)	Platinum	1,000,000^{‡}
^{‡} Sales+streaming figures based on certification alone.

== Release history ==
"What It Is (Block Boy)" release history
Region	Date	Format(s)	Version	Label	Ref.
Various	March 17, 2023	Digital download; streaming	Original Single	Top Dawg; Capitol	
Various	March 17, 2023	Digital download; streaming	Versions EP	Top Dawg; Capitol	
Various	June 8, 2023	Digital download; streaming	Solo Single	Top Dawg; Capitol	
United States	July 11, 2023	Contemporary hit radio	Original Single	Top Dawg; Capitol	
