= Baby Mama (Fantasia song) =

Single by Fantasia

from the album Free Yourself
- Released: February 14, 2005
- Genre: R&B
- Length: 4:15
- Label: J
- Songwriter(s): Barbara Acklin; Vito Colapietro; Neely Dinkins; Harold Lilly; Eugene Record
- Producer(s): The Co-Stars; Harold Lilly

Fantasia singles chronology
"Truth Is" (2004)	"Baby Mama" (2005)	"Free Yourself" (2005)

"Baby Mama" is a song recorded by American singer Fantasia for her debut studio album Free Yourself (2004). It was written and produced by Vito Colapietro, Neely Dinkins, and Harold Lilly. The song samples from "There Will Never Be Any Peace (Until God Is Seated at the Conference Table)" by American group The Chi-Lites; thus, Eugene Record and Barbara Acklin are also credited as songwriters. "Baby Mama" was released as the second single from Free Yourself on February 14, 2005, by J Records.

A moderate commercial success, "Baby Mama" peaked at number 60 on the US Billboard Hot 100, and number 16 on the Hot R&B/Hip-Hop Songs.

== Critical reception ==
Critics accused the song of sending the wrong message about sexual activity and pregnancy to teens. The song takes its title from the slang term baby mama. Fantasia stated that "Baby Mama" is dedicated to "all of those single moms out there who tough it out to take care of the kids and work two jobs, go to school".

== Credits and personnel ==
Credits adapted from the liner notes of Free Yourself.

- Kamel Abdo – mixing, recording
- Barbara Acklin – writer
- Vito Colapietro – producer, writer
- Neely Dinkins – producer, writer
- Allison Lilly – background vocalist
- Harold Lilly – producer, writer
- Eugene Record – writer

== Charts ==
=== Weekly charts ===
2005 weekly chart performance for "Baby Mama"
Chart	Peak position
US Billboard Hot 100	60
US Hot R&B/Hip-Hop Songs (Billboard)	16

=== Year-end charts ===
2005 year-end chart performance for "Baby Mama"
Chart	Position
US Hot R&B/Hip-Hop Songs (Billboard)	74

== Release history ==
Release dates and formats for "Baby Mama"
Region	Date	Format(s)	Label(s)	Ref.
United States	February 14, 2005	Urban contemporary radio	J	
