= Kid Sister =

American rapper

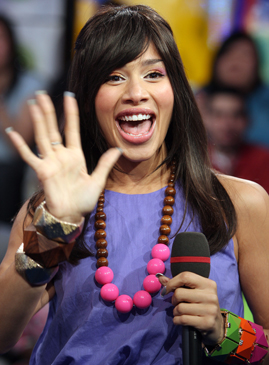
- Kid Sister in 2008

Background information
- Born: Melissa Lauren Young; July 3, 1980 (age 46); Markham, Illinois, U.S.
- Origin: Chicago, Illinois, U.S.
- Genres: Hip-hop; neo soul
- Occupations: Rapper, singer, songwriter
- Years active: 2006–present
- Labels: Fool's Gold, Downtown, Universal Republic
- Member of: Sault
- Website: foolsgoldrecs.com/artists/kid-sister/

Melissa Lauren Young (born July 3, 1980), known professionally as Kid Sister, is an American rapper and singer based in Chicago. She is known for her single "Pro Nails", which features Kanye West, and for her covert work as a member of the British music collective Sault.

== Biography ==
Kid Sister was born Melissa Lauren Young on July 3, 1980, in Markham. She started to rap in October 2006, becoming an MC at monthly dance parties hosted by DJ duo Flosstradamus (Josh Young, of Flosstradamus, is Melisa's brother), who were featured in MTV's My Block that same year. She made URB's "The Next 1000" cover in April 2007, and was signed to DJ A-Trak's label, Fool's Gold, who released her first single "Pro Nails", which features Kanye West. Kid Sister later signed with Downtown Records, who re-released "Pro Nails" to critical acclaim.

Kid Sister also appears on Tittsworth's "WTF", from his debut album 12 Steps, with Pase Rock. She had also finished a mixtape with A-Trak. In Fall 2009, Kid Sister finished recording her debut studio album. The title was changed from Dream Date to Ultraviolet. The album was produced by the likes of Rusko, The Count & Sinden, XXXChange, and Brian Kennedy, and includes a collaboration with English singer Estelle titled "First Ladies", which is a remake of Queen Latifah's 1989 acclaimed track "Ladies First" from her debut album All Hail the Queen.

Her single "Control" is featured in the 2009 music video game DJ Hero, combined with Rihanna's "Disturbia". The album's lead single was "Right Hand Hi", produced by Steve Angello and Sebastian Ingrosso of house DJ group Swedish House Mafia.

"I think a lot of people are going to be surprised with the fact that there's a bunch of raw hip-hop records on there," said A-Trak. "It's not all up tempo clubby stuff. I think a lot of people are going to be impressed with her growth also because when she made a lot of the records that people have heard by now, she was just starting to rap."

In late 2010, Kid Sister released a mixtape titled Kiss Kiss Kiss and in 2014 she released a second mixtape, Dusk2Dawn: The Diary of Jane Jupiter in which she tackled more serious, personal subjects. In 2016, she began working on her second album with British producer Inflo. Kid Sister is a member of the British music collective Sault, along with Inflo and British singer-songwriter Cleo Sol.

== Personal life ==
Kid Sister's ethnic background includes African American, Native American, and Caucasian. In numerous interviews and magazine articles, she has revealed that she has struggled financially for years before becoming West's protégé. She has also admitted to being 215 pounds at one point in her life. She continued in the same interview to state that she has been "thick" her whole life, but explained that this has had no bearing on her self-esteem, because at her core she is not a passive person.

Kid Sister has a degree in film from Columbia College Chicago and worked on two independent feature films during her studies: 9/11 drama The Guys (2002) starring Sigourney Weaver and Anthony LaPaglia; and Best Thief in the World (2003) starring Mary-Louise Parker and Audra McDonald. Kid Sister for a time concurrently worked for the retail chain Bath & Body Works, Little Threads, a children's clothing store, and Wild Hare, a reggae bar in Wrigleyville.

== Discography ==
=== Albums ===
- Ultraviolet (2009)

=== Mixtapes ===
- Kiss Kiss Kiss (2011)
- DUSK2DAWN: The Diary of Jane Jupiter (2014)

=== EPs ===
- Kiss & Tell (2011)

=== Singles ===
==== Solo ====
Year	Title	Peak chart positions					Album
Year	Title	US	US sales	UK	UK dance	UK R&B	Album
2007	"Control"	—	—	—	—	—	Ultraviolet
2008	"Pro Nails" (featuring Kanye West)	—	21	—	—	—	Ultraviolet
2009	"Get Fresh"	—	—	—	—	—	Ultraviolet
2009	"Right Hand Hi"	—	—	97	—	31	Ultraviolet
2010	"Daydreaming" (featuring CeeLo Green)	—	—	132	14	—	Ultraviolet
2010	"Big 'n Bad"	—	—	—	—	—	Ultraviolet
2011	"Look Out Weekend" (featuring Nina Sky)	—	—	—	—	—	Kiss Kiss Kiss
2011	"Kiss Kiss Kiss"	—	—	—	—	—	Kiss Kiss Kiss
2019	"Long Way Back"	—	—	—	—	—	—

==== As featured performer ====
Year	Title	Peak chart positions					Album
Year	Title	US	US sales	UK	UK dance	UK R&B	Album
2008	"Beeper" (The Count & Sinden featuring Kid Sister)	—	—	69	1	—	Non-album single
2010	"Do Do! Do!" (Carte Blanche featuring Kid Sister)	—	—			—	Black Billionaires
2010	"Im'ma Get It" (Paul Wall featuring Kid Sister and Bun B)	—	—	—	—	—	Heart of a Champion
2022	"The Darkest Part" (Danger Mouse and Black Thought featuring Raekwon and Kid Sister)	—	—	—	—	—	Cheat Codes

== Awards and nominations ==
- BET Awards
  - 2008: Best Female Hip-Hop Artist (nominated)
