= Free Yourself (Fantasia album) =

Studio album by Fantasia
- Released: November 23, 2004
- Recorded: 2004
- Genre: R&B
- Length: 51:00
- Label: 19; S; J
- Producer: Louis Biancaniello; Co-Stars; Jermaine Dupri; Missy Elliott; Rodney Jerkins; Harold Lilly; Jazze Pha; Ric Rude; Soulshock & Karlin; The Underdogs; Sam Watters; Nigel Wright

Fantasia chronology
Free Yourself (2004)	Fantasia (2006)

Singles from Free Yourself
- 1. "Truth Is" Released: November 15, 2004; 2. "Baby Mama" Released: February 14, 2005; 3. "It's All Good" Released: March 15, 2005; 4. "Free Yourself" Released: April 4, 2005; 5. "Ain't Gon' Beg You" Released: August 1, 2005

Free Yourself is the debut studio album by American singer Fantasia. It was released on November 23, 2004, by 19 Recordings, S Records and J Records.

After winning the third season of American Idol in May 2004, Fantasia signed a joint deal with J Records and 19 Entertainment. She subsequently began recording Free Yourself, working with a variety of songwriters and producers, including Louis Biancaniello, Craig Brockman, Bryan-Michael Cox, Clive Davis, Jermaine Dupri, Missy Elliott, Sean Garrett, Jazze Pha, Darkchild, Harold Lilly, Ric Rude, Soulshock & Karlin, The Underdogs, Sam Watters and Nigel Wright. Fantasia's debut single "I Believe", released in June 2004, debuted atop the US Billboard Hot 100, and was later included on Free Yourself.

Upon release, Free Yourself earned largely mixed reviews from music critics, most of whom praised Fantasia's vocal performance but criticized the record's production. A commercial success, the album debuted at number eight on the US Billboard 200, with first-week sales of 240,000 units; it had sold 1.8 million copies in the US by 2010. Despite critical polarity, the album was nominated for three Grammy Awards in 2006. Free Yourself produced five singles; the lead single "Truth Is" peaked at number 21 on the US Billboard Hot 100, while the title track reached number 41.

== Singles ==
In June 2004, Fantasia released her debut single, "I Believe", which later debuted at number one on the US Billboard Hot 100, making her the first artist in history to achieve this with a first single. On the sales chart, the song spent eleven consecutive weeks at number one, giving it the longest consecutive stay on top of that chart for an American Idol contestant. The CD single, "I Believe", went on to become the top selling single of 2004 in the United States. The song was later included as the closing track on Free Yourself.

"Truth Is" was released as the lead single from Free Yourself on November 15, 2004. It peaked at number 21 on Billboard Hot 100, and number two on Hot R&B/Hip-Hop Songs. The most successful single taken from the album, it topped the Adult R&B Songs chart for 13 weeks. "Baby Mama" was released as the second single on February 14, 2005, peaking at number 60 on the Billboard Hot 100, and number 16 on Hot R&B/Hip-Hop Songs.

"It's All Good" was released as the third single from Free Yourself on March 15, 2005. Its remixes, produced by The Scumfrog and Nate Skaten, prompted the song to reach number 21 on the US Dance Club Songs. "Free Yourself" was released as the fourth single on April 4. The song peaked at number 41 on the Billboard Hot 100 and number three on the Hot R&B/Hip-Hop Songs, also becoming Fantasia's second number-one hit on the Adult R&B Songs. "Ain't Gon' Beg You" was released as the fifth and final single from Free Yourself on August 1, 2005, reaching the top 40 on the Hot R&B/Hip-Hop Songs.

== Critical reception ==
Professional ratings
Review scores
Source	Rating
AllMusic	3/5 stars
MTV Asia	8/10
Rolling Stone	3/5 stars
Slant Magazine	2.5/5 stars

Free Yourself was released to largely mixed reviews from music critics. Stephen Thomas Erlewine of AllMusic rated the album three out of five stars and wrote: "Free Yourself is looser and hipper than any previous American Idol album. Gone is Matthew Wilder, who contributed to Kelly's debut; gone are Neil Sedaka and Aldo Nova, who featured heavily on Clay's album. In their place are Missy Elliott, Jermaine Dupri and Rodney Jerkins, hip-hop hitmakers who give a good indication that this album is striving to seem fresh and hip, something that no other American Idol album has even attempted." IGN critic Chris Carle "note that "there are a few missteps on Free Yourself, but the album as a whole is solid, old-fashioned R&B featuring thee best voice yet to come from America's most popular show."

Christian Hoard from Rolling Stone found that Free Yourself "leaves too much room for the pyrotechnics that constitute vocal talent on the show. But Barrino has gotten crucial help from a cavalcade of top urban songwriters and producers. The result is solid, up-to-date R&B; that puts some sexy bounce into its soccer-mom pop and bookends a cover of "Summertime" with a Missy Elliott jam." Sal Cinquemani, writing for Slant Magazine, described the album as "a smattering of everything that’s going on in mainstream R&B right now." He added: "These are artists we’ve gotten to know in a live context, and like most of the albums by the Idols before her, Free Yourself doesn't fully capture the Fantasia we watched make Paula weep on TV week after week." Neva Chonin from San Francisco Chronicle felt that Fantasia's "first CD doesn't do her justice [...] Layered vocals pour like waterfalls, Fantasia's skills are extolled in sundry shout-outs, and faux-vinyl scratchiness lends touches of nostalgic verite. Even the Elliott-produced title track is clinically smooth and forgettable."

== Accolades ==
Awards and nominations for Free Yourself
Year	Award	Category	Nominee(s)	Result
2004	Billboard Music Awards	Top Selling Single of the Year	"I Believe"	Won
2004	Billboard Music Awards	Top Selling R&B/Hip-Hop Single of the Year	"I Believe"	Won
2005	Billboard American Urban Radio Networks	Top R&B/Hip-Hop Single	"I Believe"	Won
2005	American Music Awards	Favorite Soul/R&B Album	Free Yourself	Nominated
2006	Grammy Awards	Best Female R&B Vocal Performance	"Free Yourself"	Nominated
2006	Grammy Awards	Best Traditional R&B Vocal Performance	"Summertime"	Nominated
2006	Grammy Awards	Best R&B Album	Free Yourself	Nominated
2006	ASCAP Rhythm and Soul Awards	Most Performed Song	"Free Yourself"	Won
2006	ASCAP Rhythm and Soul Awards	Most Performed Song	"Truth Is"	Won
2006	Soul Train Music Award	Best Female R&B/Soul Album	Free Yourself	Nominated

== Commercial performance ==
Free Yourself debuted and peaked at number eight on the US Billboard 200 in the week ending November 12, 2004, with first week sales of 240,000 copies. It also reached number two on Billboard's Top R&B/Hip-Hop Albums chart. A steady seller, it remained 42 weeks on the chart and was eventually certified platinum by Recording Industry Association of America (RIAA) on January 6, 2005. By August 2010, Free Yourself had sold 1.8 million copies in the United States, according to Nielsen Soundscan.

== Track listing ==
Free Yourself – Standard edition
No.	Title	Writer(s)	Producer(s)	Length
1.	"Ain't Gon' Beg You"	Durrell Babbs; Eric Dawkins; Antonio Dixon; Harvey Mason, Jr.; Damon Thomas	The Underdogs	4:14
2.	"Free Yourself" (featuring Missy Elliott)	Missy Elliott; Craig Brockman; Nisan Stewart	Elliott; Brockman^{[a]}	4:18
3.	"Truth Is"	Alex Cantrell; Carsten Schack; Chris Jasper; Ernie Isley; Kenneth Karlin; Marvin Isley; O'Kelly Isley, Jr.; Patrick Smith; Ronald Isley; Rudolph Isley; Thabiso Nkhereanye	Soulshock & Karlin	3:55
4.	"Selfish (I Want You to Myself)" (featuring Missy Elliott)	Elliott; Brockman; Corte Ellis; Cainon Lamb	Elliott; Lamb^{[a]}	3:24
5.	"Summertime"	George Gershwin; Ira Gershwin; DuBose Heyward	Nigel Wright	2:46
6.	"Baby Mama"	Barbara Acklin; Vito Colapietro; Neely Dinkins; Harold Lilly; Eugene Record	Harold Lilly; Co-Stars	4:1
7.	"Got Me Waiting"	Ciara Harris; Jermaine Dupri; Johnta Austin; Bryan-Michael Cox	Dupri; Cox^{[a]}	3:51
8.	"It's All Good"	Rodney Jerkins; Ricky Lewis; Sean Garrett	Jerkins; Ric Rude; Garrett^{[a]}	4:05
9.	"You Were Always on My Mind"	Johnny Christopher; Mark James; Wayne Carson Thompson	The Underdogs	3:43
10.	"Good Lovin'"	Elliott; Brockman; Stewart	Elliott; Brockman^{[a]}	3:53
11.	"Don't Act Right" (featuring Jazze Pha)	Phalon Alexander; Austin; Charles Pettaway; Zachary Wallace	Jazze Pha	4:03
12.	"This Is Me"	Babbs; Dixon; Mason, Jr.; Thomas	The Underdogs; Dixon^{[a]}	3:33
13.	"I Believe"	Louis Biancaniello; Tamyra Gray; Sam Watters	Biancaniello; Watters	5:00

Free Yourself – Japanese edition (bonus tracks)
No.	Title	Writer(s)	Producer(s)	Length
14.	"It's All Good" (The Scumfrog Mixshow)	Jerkins; Lewis; Garrett	Jerkins; Rude; Garrett^{[a]}; The Scumfrog^{[b]}	5:31
15.	"Truth Is" (Nate Skaten Mixshow)	Cantrell; Schack; Jasper; Ernie Isley; Karlin; Marvin Isley; O'Kelly Isley, Jr.; Smith; Ronald Isley; Rudolph Isley; Nkhereanye	Soulshock & Karlin

Notes

- ^{^[a]} signifies co-producer
- ^{^[b]} signifies additional producer

Sample credits

- "Truth Is" contains a sample from "The Highways of My Life", performed by The Isley Brothers.
- "Selfish (I Want You to Myself)" contains a sample from "Dil Aaj Shair Hai", performed by Kishore Kumar.
- "Baby Mama" contains a sample from "There Will Never Be Any Peace (Until God Is Seated at the Conference Table)", performed by The Chi-Lites.

== Personnel ==
- Kamel Abdo – engineer, mixing
- Gerald Albright – saxophone
- Maxi Anderson – choir, chorus
- Carlos Bedoya – engineer, mixing, programming
- Charile Bereal – drum programming
- Louis Biancaniello – arranger, keyboards, mixing, producer, programming
- Leslie Brathwaite – mixing
- Craig Brockman – keyboards, producer
- Chris Brown – assistant
- Eric Butler – choir, chorus
- Debra Byrd – choir, chorus
- David Campbell – string arrangements, string conductor
- Darius Campo – violin
- Vadim Chislov – assistant
- Steve Churchyard – audio engineer, engineer
- Nicholas Cooper – choir, chorus
- Larry Corbett – cello
- Bryan-Michael Cox – producer
- Eric Dawkins – main personnel, backing vocals
- Joel Derouin – violin
- Kevin Dorsey – choir, chorus
- Laura Marie Duncan – stylist
- Jermaine Dupri – producer
- Missy Elliott – audio production, main personnel, producer, backing vocals
- Fantasia Barrino – vocals
- Angela Fisher – choir, chorus
- Gloria Elias Foeillet – make-up
- Matthew Funes – viola
- Armen Garabedian – violin
- Berj Garabedian – violin
- Sean Garrett – engineer, producer, vocal producer
- Jon Gass – mixing
- Tamyra Gray – main personnel, backing vocals
- Laurence Greenfield – violin
- Julian Hallmark – violin
- Dabling Harward – editing, engineer
- David Heuer – assistant
- Ross Hogarth – engineer
- John Horesco IV – engineer
- Bill Hughes – orchestra contractor
- Jun Ishizeki – assistant engineer
- Jazze Pha – main personnel, producer, rap
- Rodney Jerkins – mixing, producer
- Jeff Kanan – assistant
- Karlin – arranger, instrumentation, producer
- Mark Kiczula – assistant engineer
- Darlene Koldenhoven – choir, chorus
- Chris LeBeau – artwork
- Natalie Leggett – violin
- Mario de León – violin
- Lil' Steve – main personnel, backing vocals
- Allison Lilly – backing vocals
- Harold Lilly – producer
- Bill Malina – audio engineer, engineer
- Manny Marroquin – mixing
- Yolanda McCullough – digital editing, engineer
- Byron Motley – choir, chorus
- Neeko – hair stylist
- Bobbi Page – choir, chorus
- Alyssa Park – violin
- Sara Parkins – violin
- Michael Parnin – mixing
- Bob Peterson – violin
- Charles Pettaway – guitar, main personnel
- Greg Phillinganes – piano
- Ric Rude – producer
- Tom Ranier – orchestration
- Aaron Renner – assistant
- Brian Scheuble – engineer
- Robin Sellars – engineer
- Gabe Sganga – assistant engineer
- Deborah Sharpe-Taylor – choir, chorus
- Dan Smith – cello
- Isabel Snyder – photography
- Nico Solis – engineer
- Soulshock – arranger, instrumentation, producer
- Soulshock & Karlin – audio production
- Nisan Stewart – drums
- Jazmine Sullivan – main personnel, backing vocals
- Phil Tan – mixing
- Tank – main personnel, various instruments
- Melanie Taylor – choir, chorus
- The Underdogs – audio production, instrumentation, main personnel, producer, various instruments
- Sam Watters – arranger, producer, backing vocals
- Tony Wilkins – choir, chorus
- Yvonne Williams – choir, chorus
- Evan Wilson – viola
- John Wittenberg – violin
- Terry Wood – choir, chorus
- Nigel Wright – producer
- Alexis Yraola – art direction, design

== Charts ==
=== Weekly charts ===
Weekly chart performance for Free Yourself
Chart (2004)	Peak position
Canadian R&B Albums (Nielsen SoundScan)	11
US Billboard 200	8
US Top R&B/Hip-Hop Albums (Billboard)	2

=== Year-end charts ===
Year-end chart performance for Free Yourself
Chart (2005)	Position
US Billboard 200	27
US Top R&B/Hip-Hop Albums (Billboard)	7

== Certifications ==
Certifications for Free Yourself
Region	Certification	Certified units/sales
United States (RIAA)	Platinum	1,800,000
