= The Definition Of... =

Studio album by Fantasia
- Released: July 29, 2016
- Genre: R&B
- Length: 48:37
- Labels: RCA; 19
- Producers: Ron Fair (exec.); R. Kelly; Brian Kennedy; Neff-U; Jerome "J-Roc" Harmon; GRADES; Priscilla Renea; Dylan Wiggins; Dreshan Smith; Tye Tribbett; David Outing

Fantasia chronology
Side Effects of You (2013)	The Definition Of... (2016)	Christmas After Midnight (2017)

Singles from The Definition Of...
- 1. "No Time for It" Released: January 7, 2016; 2. "Sleeping with the One I Love" Released: May 26, 2016; 3. "When I Met You" Released: January 17, 2017

The Definition Of... is the fifth studio album by American recording artist Fantasia. It was released by RCA Records and 19 Recordings on July 29, 2016, in the United States and for online streaming worldwide on Apple Music a day earlier. Fantasia worked with producers Ron Fair, Brian Kennedy, Neff-U, Jerome "J-Roc" Harmon and GRADES on the album. The album featured two top ten singles on the US Billboard Adult R&B Songs airplay chart: "No Time for It", which peaked at number six, and "Sleeping with the One I Love" which peaked at number nine.

In order to further promote the album, Fantasia embarked on a tour with Anthony Hamilton called Fantasia & Anthony Hamilton: Live in Concert. The Definition Of... received mixed to positive reviews from music critics. The album peaked at number six on the US Billboard 200. The album also topped that week's Billboard Top R&B Albums chart, and peaked at number two on the US Top R&B/Hip-Hop Albums chart. The album was also promoted with a US twelve-show tour titled The Definition Of... Tour, which started on November 16, 2016, and ended on December 4, 2016. The third single "When I Met You" was released on January 17, 2017.

== Background and development ==
After performing in the Broadway musical After Midnight, Fantasia began working on her fifth studio album with producer Harmony Samuels. She had previously collaborated with Samuels for her fourth album Side Effects of You (2013); she referred to him as her "Quincy Jones" since she would work "from scratch with him going to the keyboard and just playing things". For the album, Fantasia wanted to combine her soulful childhood singing in church with "a certain side of [her] that wants to tap into that whole rock world". Frustrated with the amount of record label interference in the past, she described executives' plans to determine her sound and style as "prostituting the artist’s gift", and wanted to avoid such influences for the album.

During interviews promoting the record, she said that the album was initially produced by another artist who she “really, really, really loved", but she switched to a different team for the final product. She explained: "“Sometimes, when you work with producers who are artists, it’s very hard, They are doing their thing … and things got a little chaotic.” Derrick G. Kennedy of the Los Angeles Times speculated that Fantasia was referring to R. Kelly. During the early stages of the album's production, Fantasia posted several videos on her social media accounts of her recording sessions with Kelly, including one on November 20, 2014.

Fantasia worked with producers Ron Fair, Brian Kennedy, Neff-U, Jerome "J-Roc" Harmon, and GRADES; the album includes features from Tye Tribbett and Stacy Barthe. In an interview with Essence magazine, Fantasia discussed her intentions to incorporate live music and real musical instruments into the album. She explained that her desire was to avoid following the trends of contemporary radio, adding "I wanted music that would touch people's hearts; that would bless people and move people because, you know, music makes the world go round". Fantasia also sought to have full control over the album's production and release, saying she regretted "not taking control of her destiny sooner." She was influenced by Aerosmith, Tina Turner, Prince, James Brown, and Michael Jackson.

== Title and artwork ==
The title and cover of The Definition Of... were revealed on April 21, 2016. According to Fantasia, the title represents how she is every woman: "I'm the definition of strength, the definition of love, the definition of a fighter, the list goes on." The cover features one of mixed media artist Kip Omolade's Diovadiova Chrome's paintings, which took five months to complete. Omolade described feeling a connection with Fantasia, saying "we both share a commitment to skillful artistry and soulful expression".

== Release and promotion ==
The album was originally scheduled to be released on June 10, but it was pushed back to July 29. It was made available for streaming a day early through Apple Music. The album spawned two singles, and two promotional singles. "No Time for It" was released as the lead single from the album on January 7, 2016. It peaked at number six on the United States' Adult R&B Songs Billboard chart. "Ugly" was released on April 7 as a promotional single; Fantasia performed it on the series finale of American Idol on the same day. The songs "So Blue" and "Sleeping with the One I Love" were released on April 21 and May 26 respectively. Photographer Derek Blanks shot the accompanying music video for "Sleeping with the One I Love", which features Fantasia "portray[ing] multiple characters in a compelling plot twist". "When I Met You" was released as the third single from the album on January 17, 2017.

To further promote the album, Fantasia embarked on the Fantasia & Anthony Hamilton: Live in Concert with Anthony Hamilton. The tour started on April 21, 2016, and ended on June 19. They had twenty-eight shows in North America. Fantasia embarked on her solo tour The Definition Of... Tour in the United States only between November 16 and December 4, 2016.

== Critical reception ==
Professional ratings
Review scores
Source	Rating
Allmusic	3/5 stars
Entertainment Weekly	B−
Soul in Stereo	3.5/5 stars
SoulTracks	(recommended)

The Definition Of... received a positive review from pop music website PopCrush. Editor Matthew Scott Donnelly wrote that "across 11 tracks, Fantasia shifts gears as frequently as she did on American Idol, when following up a Barry Manilow single with "Signed, Sealed, Delivered" didn't seem strange. Somehow, though, it works — it's more intentional heterogeneity than frantic mess, and will likely have you questioning why more albums aren't taking as many left turns." Entertainment Weekly's Chuck Arnold gave album the grade of B−. While praising album's tracks "Sleeping with the One I Love", "I Made It" and "Lonely Legend", they criticized her tracks "Roller Coaster" and "Wait for You". He described "Sleeping with the One I Love" as "a jazzy torch song penned by R. Kelly" and "I Made It" as "a spiritual turn-up that shows Fantasia should make a gospel album."

Andy Kellman of AllMusic gave album mixed review, giving it 2.5 out of five stars, saying: "The album starts with a cluttered, uptempo rock-R&B hybrid and never really stabilizes after that, abruptly moving into one of a few ballads suited more for a pop-oriented R&B artist, later involving a contemporary country number seemingly written by an algorithm, and a triumphant Tye Tribbett-driven gospel belter, among other approaches [...] One mark of consistency here is that Barrino often sounds like she's fulfilling roles, however effectively, rather than baring her soul." Thisisrnb.com wrote that "never one to be what others want her to be, Fantasia defines herself with no apologies on The Definition Of... [...] Her ability to transition from one genre to the next is a unique dynamic of her artistry. Her confident vocals reflect the strength she has discovered despite her weaknesses." Soul in Stereo gave The Definition Of... a mixed review, rating it 3.5 out of five stars, stating that it is the singer "at her most confident. From the uplifting optimism of "Stay Up" to the affirmation of beauty preached in "Ugly", Fantasia is unapologetically raw and refreshingly real. Inconsistent pacing and a lack of standout tracks make the collection far from flawless, but hey, neither is Fantasia." Melody Charles from SoulTracks called The Definition Of... "a compilation that's as uneven, yet intriguing, as the woman who created it."

== Accolades ==
The album was ranked at number fourteen on Rolling Stone's 20 Best Albums of 2016 year-end list on December 14, 2016.

Year	Provider	Accolade	Rank	Ref.
2016	Rolling Stone	20 Best Albums of 2016	14	

At the 59th Annual Grammy Awards in February 2017, the album's second single "Sleeping with the One I Love" was nominated for Grammy Award for Best Traditional R&B Performance.

Year	Award	Category	Work	Result	Ref.
2017	Grammy Award	Best Traditional R&B Performance	"Sleeping with the One I Love"	Nominated	

== Commercial performance ==
The Definition Of... debuted in the top ten of the US Billboard 200 chart, peaking at number six with the sales of 32,000 during its first week of release. It became her third consecutive and fourth non-consecutive US top ten album. The album debuted at number one on the US Billboard Top R&B Albums and number two on the US Billboard Top R&B/Hip-Hop Albums.

== Track listing ==
The Definition Of... track listing
No.	Title	Writer(s)	Producer(s)	Length
1.	"Crazy"	Troi Irons	Jerome "J-Roc" Harmon	4:49
2.	"No Time for It"	Brian Kennedy; Lance Eric Shipp; Paris Jones	Brian Kennedy	3:25
3.	"So Blue"	Ron Fair; Theron Thomas; Timothy Thomas; Chuckie Thompson; Shareefa Cooper	Fair	4:23
4.	"When I Met You"	Ron "Neff-U" Feemster; Priscilla "Priscilla Renea" Hamilton	Fair; Hamilton; Feemster	4:33
5.	"Sleeping with the One I Love"	R. Kelly	Kelly	5:03
6.	"Stay Up" (featuring Stacy Barthe)	Stacy Barthe; Pedro Fontes Veiga Jr.; Dylan Wiggins	Dylan Wiggins; Fair	3:37
7.	"Ugly"	Audra Mae; Nicolle Galyon	Fair	3:17
8.	"Wait for You"	Sasha Monica Keable; Scott Hoffman; Vanya Saide Taylor; Daniel Traynor	GRADES	5:09
9.	"Roller Coasters" (featuring Aloe Blacc)	Madeline Fuhrman; Mathieu Carratier; Fair; Fantasia Barrino; Aloe Blacc	Fair	4:55
10.	"Lonely Legend"	Dreshan Smith; Michael Carlos Jones; Salomes Jackson	Dreshan Smith; Fair	3:50
11.	"I Made It" (featuring Tye Tribbett)	Tye Tribbett; David Outing	Fair; Tye Tribbett; David Outing	5:40
Total length:				48:41

== Charts ==
=== Weekly charts ===
Weekly chart performance for The Definition Of...
Chart (2016)	Peak position
US Billboard 200	6
US Top R&B/Hip-Hop Albums (Billboard)	2

=== Year-end charts ===
Year-end chart performance for The Definition Of...
Chart (2016)	Position
US Top R&B/Hip-Hop Albums (Billboard)	41

== Release history ==
Release dates and formats for The Definition Of...
Region	Date	Format(s)	Label(s)	Catalog	Ref.
Various	July 28, 2016	Streaming	Sony Music	B01BD0NL0Q	
United States	July 29, 2016	CD; digital download	RCA; 19	B01BD0NL0Q	
