= I Believe (Fantasia song) =

2004 American Idol winner's single

Single by Fantasia

from the album Free Yourself
- B-side: "Chain of Fools"; "Summertime"
- Released: June 15, 2004
- Recorded: 2004
- Studio: NRG (North Hollywood, California); Homesite 13 (Novato, California); Record Plant (Hollywood, California)
- Length: 5:02
- Label: J; 19; S
- Songwriters: Tamyra Gray; Sam Watters; Louis Biancaniello
- Producers: Louis Biancaniello; Sam Watters

Fantasia singles chronology
"I Believe" (2004)	"Truth Is" (2004)

"I Believe" is a song by American Idol third season winner Fantasia. The song was co-written by Louis Biancaniello, Sam Watters, and former American Idol contestant Tamyra Gray. Released as Fantasia's debut single on June 15, 2004, "I Believe" debuted at number one on the US Billboard Hot 100, selling 142,000 copies during its first week and winning three Billboard awards. The song also reached number one on the Canadian Singles Chart and number four on Australia's ARIA Singles Chart. It was included on Fantasia's debut studio album, Free Yourself, released on November 23, 2004.

== Background ==
Fantasia sang "I Believe" on the third-season finale of American Idol as her last performance within the competition. Diana DeGarmo, the runner up of American Idol, sang the song first on the finale, for her first performance of the night. The judges unanimously acclaimed Fantasia the winner, a prediction that came true when she was crowned the following evening. An ecstatic and tearful Fantasia performed her new single "I Believe" minutes after the announcement. DeGarmo's performance was also well received by the judges.

== Release and commercial performance ==
"I Believe" was released in the United States on June 15, 2004, as a CD single and 7-inch single. The song debuted on the US Billboard Hot 100 at number one, staying there for one week. During its debut week, the single sold 142,000 copies, making it the second debut solo single by a female artist to commence its chart run at number one, following Lauryn Hill's "Doo Wop (That Thing)". It has sold 527,000 copies in the United States as of 2009. "I Believe" was the winner of two Billboard Music Awards and one Billboard American Urban Radio Networks award. In Canada, the song remained atop the Canadian Singles Chart for 10 weeks and was certified double platinum by the Canadian Recording Industry Association (CRIA), shipping more than 80,000 units.

Outside North America, "I Believe" charted in Australia, New Zealand, and Romania. In Australia, the song was issued as a CD single on July 19, 2004. The following week, it debuted at its peak of number four on the ARIA Singles Chart. By doing so, Fantasia became the second American Idol winner to chart in Australia, after Kelly Clarkson debuted on the ARIA chart with "Miss Independent" in 2003. "I Believe" stayed in the top 50 for 11 weeks, ending 2004 as Australia's 85th-best-selling single and earning a gold certification from the Australian Recording Industry Association (ARIA) for shipping over 35,000 copies. In New Zealand, the song charted on the RIANZ Singles Chart for five weeks, peaking at number 20 for two weeks in August 2004. On the Romanian Top 100, the single charted for one week, appearing at number 93 on July 19, 2004.

== Awards ==
Year	Award	Category	Result	Ref.
2004	Billboard Music Awards	Top Selling Single of the Year	Won	
2004	Billboard Music Awards	Top Selling R&B/Hip-Hop Single of the Year	Won	
2005	Billboard American Urban Radio Networks	Top R&B/Hip-Hop Single	Won	

== Track listings ==
US, Canadian, and Australian CD single

1. "I Believe"
2. "Chain of Fools"
3. "Summertime"

US 7-inch single

A. "I Believe"
B. "Summertime"

== Credits and personnel ==
Credits are lifted from the US CD single liner notes.

Studios

- Recorded at NRG Studios (North Hollywood, California), Homesite 13 (Novato, California), and the Record Plant (Hollywood, California)
- Mixed at Homesite 13 (Novato, California)

Writing and production

- Tamyra Gray – writing, background vocals
- Sam Watters – writing, background vocals, production, arrangement
- Louis Biancaniello – writing, keyboards, programming, production, arrangement, mixing
- Steve Churchyard – string session engineering
- Mark Kiczula – assistant string engineering
- Ross Hogarth – choir session engineering
- Brian Scheuble – choir session engineering
- Jun Ishizeki – assistant choir engineering

Vocals

- Fantasia – vocals
- Maxi Anderson – choir
- Eric Butler – choir
- Debra Byrd – choir
- Nick Cooper – choir
- Kevin Dorsey – choir
- Angela Fisher – choir
- Sybil Harris – choir
- Darlene Koldenhoven – choir
- Byron Motley – choir
- Bobbi Page – choir
- Deborah Sharpe-Taylor – choir
- Melanie Taylor – choir
- Tony Wilkins – choir
- Terry Wood – choir
- Yvonne Williams – choir

Orchestra

- David Campbell – string arrangement, conducting
- Joel Derouin – violin
- Darius Campo – violin
- Mario DeLeon – violin
- Berj Garabedian – violin
- Armen Garabedian – violin
- Larry Greenfield – violin
- Julian Hallmark – violin
- Natalie Leggett – violin
- Alyssa Park – violin
- Sara Parkins – violin
- Bob Peterson – violin
- John Wittenberg – violin
- Evan Wilson – viola
- Matt Funes – viola
- Larry Corbett – cello
- Dan Smith – cello

== Charts ==
=== Weekly charts ===
Chart (2004–2005)	Peak position
Australia (ARIA)	4
Canada (Nielsen SoundScan)	1
New Zealand (Recorded Music NZ)	20
Romania (Romanian Top 100)	93
US Billboard Hot 100	1
US Adult Contemporary (Billboard)	27
US Hot R&B/Hip-Hop Songs (Billboard)	12

=== Year-end charts ===
Chart (2004)	Position
Australia (ARIA)	85

== Certifications ==
Region	Certification	Certified units/sales
Australia (ARIA)	Gold	35,000^{^}
Canada (Music Canada)	2× Platinum	20,000^{^}
^{^} Shipments figures based on certification alone.

== Release history ==
Region	Date	Format(s)	Label(s)	Ref.
United States	June 15, 2004	7-inch vinyl; CD	J; 19; S	
United States	July 6, 2004	Contemporary hit radio	J; 19; S	
Australia	July 19, 2004	CD	J; 19; S	

== See also ==
- List of Billboard Hot 100 number-one singles of 2004
- List of number-one singles of 2004 (Canada)
