= Right Hand Hi =

Single by Kid Sister

from the album Ultraviolet
- Released: July 16, 2009
- Genre: Electro house, hip house, hip-hop
- Length: 3:18
- Label: Asylum Records
- Songwriters: Melisa Young, Steve Angello, Sebastian Ingrosso, Dave Macklovitch
- Producers: Steve Angello, Sebastian Ingrosso, Greg Magers

Kid Sister singles chronology
"Get Fresh" (2009)	"Right Hand Hi" (2009)	"Daydreaming" (2010)

Music video
- "Right Hand Hi" on YouTube

"Right Hand Hi" is the fourth single taken from the album Ultraviolet by Kid Sister.

== Critical reception ==
Aylin Zafar of URB described the song as "an undeniable club banger."

== Live performances ==
Kid Sister performed the song "Right Hand Hi" as the featured musical guest on Episode 149 of the show Late Night with Jimmy Fallon on November 13, 2009.

== Song usage ==
Dance crew Poreotics performed to "Right Hand Hi" in Episode 6: Illusion Challenge of America's Best Dance Crew.

== Track listings ==
- UK CD single
1. "Right Hand Hi (extended version)" - 4:41
2. "Right Hand Hi (Riton Vocal Rub)" - 3:39
3. "Right Hand Hi (Riton Redub)" - 5:23
4. "Right Hand Hi (Caspa Remix)" - 4:26
5. "Right Hand Hi (Greenmoney Remix)" - 5:00
6. "Right Hand Hi (Kim Fai Remix)" - 7:04
7. "Right Hand Hi (Kim Fai Dub)" - 6:47
- U.S. CD single
1. "Right Hand Hi" - 3:22
2. "Right Hand Hi (instrumental)" - 3:22
3. "Right Hand Hi (Kill the Noise Remix)" - 5:12
4. "Right Hand Hi (Kingdom Remix)" - 3:50

== Charts ==
Chart (2009)	Peak Position
Belgian Tip Chart (Flanders)	9
UK Singles Chart	97
UK R&B Singles Chart	31
