= Truth Is (Fantasia song) =

2004 single by Fantasia

Single by Fantasia

from the album Free Yourself
- B-side: "Baby Mama"
- Released: November 15, 2004
- Genre: R&B
- Length: 3:55
- Label: J; 19
- Songwriters: Ronald Isley; Chris Jasper; O'Kelly Isley Jr.; Rudolph Isley; Ernie Isley; Marvin Isley; Carsten Schack; Alex Cantrell
- Producer: Soulshock and Karlin

Fantasia singles chronology
"I Believe" (2004)	"Truth Is" (2004)	"Baby Mama" (2005)

"Truth Is" is a song recorded by American singer Fantasia for her debut studio album Free Yourself (2004). It was written by Carsten Schack and Alex Cantrell, and produced by Soulshock & Karlin. A piano-driven R&B track, it incorporates a sample from "Highways of My Life" by the Isley Brothers; the group's members thus received writing credits for "Truth Is". The song was released as the lead single from Free Yourself on November 15, 2004, by J Records and 19 Recordings.

"Truth Is" peaked at number 21 on the US Billboard Hot 100 and at number two on the Billboard Hot R&B/Hip-Hop Singles & Tracks chart. In 2006, it won an ASCAP R&B/Hip-Hop Award, along with "Free Yourself".

== Awards and nominations ==
Year	Award	Category	Result
2006	ASCAP Rhythm and Soul Award	Most Performed Song	Won

== Track listings ==
"Dance Vault Mixes – "Truth Is" digital EP

1. "Truth Is" (Nate Skaten Radio Edit) – 4:02
2. "Truth Is" (Nate Skaten Instrumental) – 4:01
3. "Truth Is" (Nate Skaten Acappella) – 3:48
4. "Truth Is" (Nate Skaten Mixshow) – 4:58

US 7-inch single

1. "Truth Is" – 3:53
2. "Baby Mama" – 4:15

== Charts ==
=== Weekly charts ===
Weekly chart performance for "Truth Is"
Chart (2005)	Peak position
Netherlands (Urban Top 100)	18
US Billboard Hot 100	21
US Hot R&B/Hip-Hop Songs (Billboard)	2
US Rhythmic Airplay (Billboard)	31

=== Year-end charts ===
Year-end chart performance for "Truth Is"
Chart (2005)	Position
US Billboard Hot 100	73
US Hot R&B/Hip-Hop Songs (Billboard)	4

== Release history ==
Release dates and formats for "Truth Is"
Region	Date	Format(s)	Label(s)	Ref.
United States	November 15, 2004	Rhythmic contemporary radio; urban adult contemporary radio; urban contemporary radio	J	
United States	February 8, 2005	Contemporary hit radio	J	
United States	March 29, 2005	Digital download (EP)	J; 19	
