= Free Yourself (Fantasia song) =

Single by Fantasia featuring Missy Elliott

from the album Free Yourself
- Released: April 4, 2005
- Genre: R&B; soul
- Length: 4:18
- Label: J
- Songwriters: Missy Elliott; Craig Brockman; Nisan Stewart
- Producer: Missy Elliott

Fantasia singles chronology
"Baby Mama" (2004)	"Free Yourself" (2005)	"Ain't Gon' Beg You" (2005)

Missy Elliott singles chronology
"Where Could He Be?" (2005)	"Free Yourself" (2005)	"Lose Control" (2005)

Music video
- "Free Yourself" on YouTube

"Free Yourself" is a song recorded by American singer Fantasia for her debut studio album of the same title (2004). It features a guest appearance from rapper Missy Elliott, who wrote the song alongside Craig Brockman and Nisan Stewart, and produced it with Brockman. The song was released as the fourth single from Free Yourself on April 4, 2005, by J Records.

A moderate commercial success, "Free Yourself" peaked at number 41 on the US Billboard Hot 100, and number three on the US Hot R&B/Hip-Hop Songs. Critically acclaimed, it was nominated for Best R&B Song and Best Female R&B Vocal Performance at the 48th Annual Grammy Awards (2006).

== Commercial performance ==
"Free Yourself" was released as the fourth single from Fantasia's debut album Free Yourself on June 1, 2005 in United States. It peaked at number forty-one on US Billboard Hot 100, number three on Hot R&B/Hip-Hop Songs and number one the US Adult R&B Airplay chart. It received two Grammy nominations in 2006: for Best R&B Song and Best Female R&B Vocal Performance. It won an ASCAP award (ASCAP Rhythm and Soul Award) for Most Performed Song in 2006.

== Music video ==
The music video for "Free Yourself" was released in 2005 to promote the song, and, as of February 2023, it has over sixty-four million views.

== Credits and personnel ==
Credits adapted from the liner notes of Free Yourself.

- Carlos Bedoya – mixing, recording
- Craig Brockman – co-producer, keyboards, writer
- Chris Brown – mixing assistance
- Missy Elliott – background vocalist, producer, writer
- Dave Heuer – mixing assistance
- Nisan Stewart – drums, writer
- Jazmine Sullivan – background vocalist

== Charts ==
=== Weekly charts ===
Chart (2005)	Peak position
US Billboard Hot 100	41
US Hot R&B/Hip-Hop Songs (Billboard)	3

=== Year-end charts ===
Chart (2005)	Position
US Hot R&B/Hip-Hop Songs (Billboard)	7

== Awards and nominations ==
Year	Award	Category	Result
2006	Grammy Award	Best R&B Song	Nominated
2006	Grammy Award	Best Female R&B Vocal Performance	Nominated
2006	ASCAP Rhythm and Soul Award	Most Performed Song	Won

== Release history ==
Release dates and formats for "Free Yourself"
Region	Date	Format(s)	Label(s)	Ref.
United States	April 4, 2005	Urban adult contemporary radio	J	
