= List of awards and nominations received by Jennifer Hudson =

Awards by the American actress and singer

Jennifer Hudson awards and nominations
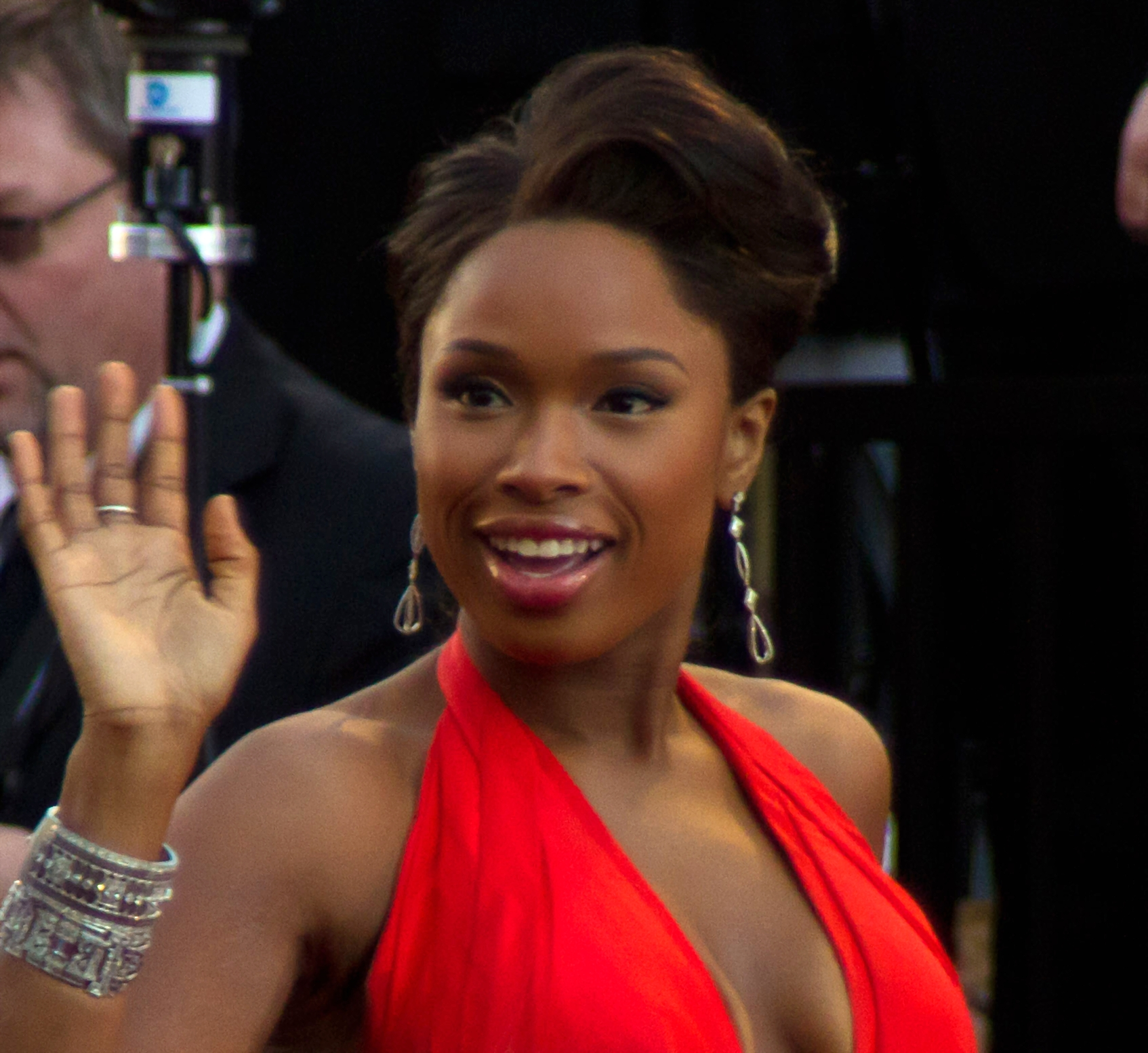
- Hudson at the 83rd Academy Awards in 2011
Awards and nominations
Award	Wins	Nominations
Academy Awards	1	1
Actor Awards	1	3
BAFTA Awards	1	1
Critics' Choice Awards	1	2
Emmy Awards	1	5
Golden Globe Awards	1	2
Grammy Awards	2	8
Tony Awards	1	1

Totals (Note: Certain award groups do not simply award one winner. They acknowledge several different recipients, have runners-up, and have third place. Since this is a specific recognition and is different from losing an award, runner-up mentions are considered wins in this award tally. For simplification and to avoid errors, each award in this list has been presumed to have had a prior nomination.)
- Wins: 65
- Nominations: 118

Jennifer Hudson is an American actress, singer, producer, and talk show host who has received various awards and nominations, including an Academy Award, a British Academy Film Award, a Critics' Choice Movie Award, a Daytime Emmy Award, a Golden Globe Award, two Grammy Awards, a Tony Award, twelve NAACP Image Awards, and a Screen Actors Guild Award. She is the youngest woman and, so far, the only alumnus from American Idol to date to have ever won the EGOT (Emmy, Grammy, Oscar, Tony) - the four most prestigious awards of the American entertainment industry.

== Acting ==
=== Academy Awards ===
The Academy Awards, now known officially as the Oscars, is a set of twenty-four awards for artistic and technical merit in the American film industry, given annually by the Academy of Motion Picture Arts and Sciences (AMPAS), to recognize excellence in cinematic achievements as assessed by the Academy's voting membership.

Year	Nominated work	Award	Result	Ref.
2007	Dreamgirls	Best Supporting Actress	Won	

=== Black Reel Awards ===
The Black Reel Awards, or "BRAs", is an annual American awards ceremony hosted by the Foundation for the Augmentation of African-Americans in Film (FAAAF) to recognize excellence in African-American, as well as those of African diaspora's cinematic achievements in the around the world film industry as assessed by the Academy's voting membership.

Year	Nominated work	Award	Result	Ref.
2007	Dreamgirls	Outstanding Supporting Actress	Won	
2007	Dreamgirls	Outstanding Breakthrough Performance	Won	
2008	The Secret Life of Bees	Outstanding Actress	Nominated	
2022	Respect	Outstanding Actress	Nominated	

=== British Academy Film Awards ===
The British Academy Film Awards are presented in an annual award show hosted by the British Academy of Film and Television Arts (BAFTA) to honour the best British and international contributions to film.

Year	Nominated work	Award	Result	Ref.
2007	Dreamgirls	Best Actress in a Supporting Role	Won	

=== Critics' Choice Movie Awards ===
The Critics' Choice Movie Awards (formerly known as the Broadcast Film Critics Association Award) is an awards show presented annually by the Broadcast Film Critics Association (BFCA) to honor the finest in cinematic achievement. Written ballots are submitted during a week-long nominating period, and the resulting nominees are announced in December.

Year	Nominated work	Award	Result	Ref.
2007	Dreamgirls	Best Supporting Actress	Won	
2007	Dreamgirls	Best Cast	Nominated (Note: Shared with the cast)	

=== Celebration of Black Cinema and Television ===
Year	Nominated work	Award	Result	Ref.
2021	Respect	Actress – Film	Won	

=== Drama League Awards ===
The Drama League Awards, created in 1935, honor distinguished productions and performances both on Broadway and Off-Broadway, in addition to recognizing exemplary career achievements in theatre, musical theatre, and directing.

Year	Nominated work	Award	Result	Ref.
2016	The Color Purple	Distinguished Performance	Nominated	

=== Golden Globe Awards ===
The Golden Globe Awards are accolades bestowed by the 93 members of the Hollywood Foreign Press Association, recognizing excellence in film and television, both domestic and foreign.

Year	Nominated work	Award	Result	Ref.
2007	Dreamgirls	Best Supporting Actress – Motion Picture	Won	

=== MTV Movie & TV Awards ===
The MTV Movie & TV Awards (formerly MTV Movie Awards) is a film and television awards show presented annually on MTV. The nominees are decided by producers and executives at MTV.

Year	Nominated work	Award	Result	Ref.
2007	Dreamgirls	Best Performance	Nominated	
2022	"Here I Am (Singing My Way Home)" (Respect)	Best Song	Nominated	

=== National Board of Review ===
The National Board of Review of Motion Pictures is an organization in the United States dedicated to discussing and selecting what its members regard as the best film works of each year.

Year	Nominated work	Award	Result	Ref.
2007	Dreamgirls	Best Supporting Actress	Runner-up	
2007	Dreamgirls	Best Breakthrough Performance	Won	

=== Palm Springs International Film Festival ===
Founded in 1989 in Palm Springs, California, the Palm Springs International Film Festival is held annually in January.

Year	Nominated work	Category	Result	Ref.
2022	Respect	Chairman's Award	Won	

=== Satellite Awards ===
The Satellite Awards are annual awards given by the International Press Academy that are commonly noted in entertainment industry journals and blogs.

Year	Nominated work	Award	Result	Ref.
2006	Dreamgirls	Best Supporting Actress – Motion Picture	Won	
2022	Respect	Best Actress in a Motion Picture – Comedy or Musical	Nominated	

=== Screen Actors Guild Awards ===
The Screen Actors Guild Award (also known as the SAG Award) is an accolade given by the Screen Actors Guild‐American Federation of Television and Radio Artists (SAG-AFTRA) to recognize outstanding performances in film and primetime television. Hudson has won once from three nominations.

Year	Nominated work	Award	Result	Ref.
2007	Dreamgirls	Outstanding Performance by a Female Actor in a Supporting Role	Won	
2007	Dreamgirls	Outstanding Performance by a Cast in a Motion Picture	Nominated	
2022	Respect	Outstanding Performance by a Female Actor in a Leading Role	Nominated	

== Music ==
=== Black Reel Awards ===
The Black Reel Awards, or "BRAs", is an annual American awards ceremony hosted by the Foundation for the Augmentation of African-Americans in Film (FAAAF) to recognize excellence in African-American, as well as those of African diaspora's cinematic achievements in the around the world film industry as assessed by the Academy's voting membership.

Year	Nominated work	Award	Result	Ref.
2022	"Here I Am (Singing My Way Home)"	Outstanding Original Song	Nominated	

=== Billboard Music Awards ===
The Billboard Music Award is an honor given by Billboard, a publication and music popularity chart covering the music business.

Year	Nominated work	Award	Result	Ref.
2012	"I Remember Me"	R&B Album of the Year	Nominated	

=== Golden Globe Awards ===
The Golden Globe Awards are accolades bestowed by the 93 members of the Hollywood Foreign Press Association, recognizing excellence in film and television, both domestic and foreign.

Year	Nominated work	Award	Result	Ref.
2022	"Here I Am (Singing My Way Home)" (Note: Shared with Jamie Hartman and Carole King)	Best Original Song	Nominated	

=== Grammy Awards ===
The Grammy Awards (originally called Gramophone Award), or Grammy, is an honor awarded by The Recording Academy to recognize outstanding achievement in the mainly English-language music industry. The annual presentation ceremony features performances by prominent artists, and the presentation of those awards that have a more popular interest. It shares recognition of the music industry as that of the other performance awards such as the Emmy Awards (television), the Tony Awards (stage performance), and the Academy Awards (motion pictures). Hudson has won two awards from nine nominations.

Year	Nominated work	Award	Result	Ref.
2008	Dreamgirls: Music from the Motion Picture	Best Compilation Soundtrack for Visual Media	Nominated	
2009	Jennifer Hudson	Best R&B Album	Won	
2009	"Spotlight"	Best Female R&B Vocal Performance	Nominated	
2009	"I'm His Only Woman"	Best R&B Performance by a Duo or Group with Vocals (Note: Shared with Fantasia Barrino)	Nominated	
2015	"It's Your World" (featuring R. Kelly)	Best R&B Performance	Nominated	
2017	The Color Purple	Best Musical Theater Album	Won	
2022	Respect	Best Compilation Soundtrack for Visual Media	Nominated	
2022	"Here I Am (Singing My Way Home)"	Best Song Written for Visual Media	Nominated	
2026	The Gift of Love	Best Traditional Pop Vocal Album	Nominated	

=== Hollywood Music in Media Awards ===
The Hollywood Music in Media Awards is an award organization honoring original music (Song and Score) in all forms visual media including film, TV, video games, trailers, commercial advertisements, documentaries, music videos and special programs.

Year	Nominated work	Award	Result	Ref.
2018	"I'll Fight"	Best Original Song in a Documentary	Won	
2021	"Here I Am (Singing My Way Home)"	Best Original Song in a Feature Film	Nominated	
2021	"Respect"	Best Original Song – Onscreen Performance	Nominated	

=== iHeartRadio Music Awards ===
The iHeartRadio Music Awards is a music awards show founded by iHeartRadio in 2014 to recognize the most popular artists and music over the past year as determined by the network's listeners.

Year	Nominated work	Award	Result	Ref.
2017	"Purple Rain"	Best Cover Song	Nominated	

=== MTV Movie & TV Awards ===
The MTV Movie & TV Awards (formerly MTV Movie Awards) is a film and television awards show presented annually on MTV. The nominees are decided by producers and executives at MTV.

Year	Nominated work	Award	Result	Ref.
2017	Hairspray Live! (Note: for "I Know Where I've Been")	Best Musical Moment	Nominated	

=== MTV Video Music Awards ===
An MTV Video Music Award (commonly abbreviated as a VMA) is an award presented by the cable channel MTV to honor the best in the music video medium.

Year	Nominated work	Award	Result	Ref.
2015	"I Still Love You"	Best Video with a Social Message	Nominated	

=== Satellite Awards ===
The Satellite Awards are annual awards given by the International Press Academy that are commonly noted in entertainment industry journals and blogs.

Year	Nominated work	Award	Result	Ref.
2022	"Here I Am (Singing My Way Home)"	Best Original Song	Nominated	

=== Society of Composers & Lyricists Awards ===
Year	Nominated work	Award	Result	Ref.
2022	"Here I Am (Singing My Way Home)"	Outstanding Original Song for a Musical or Comedy Visual Production	Nominated	

== Both ==
=== BET Awards ===
The BET Awards were established in 2001 by the Black Entertainment Television network to celebrate African Americans and other minorities in music, acting, sports, and other fields of entertainment over the past year.

Year	Nominated work	Award	Result	Ref.
2007	Herself	Best Actress	Won	
2007	Herself	Best Female R&B Artist	Nominated	
2007	Herself	Best New Artist	Won	
2009	Herself	Best Actress	Nominated	
2009	Herself	Best Female R&B Artist	Nominated	
2011	Herself	Best Female R&B Artist	Nominated	
2014	"I Can't Describe (The Way I Feel)" (featuring T.I.)	Centric Award	Nominated	
2022	Respect	Best Actress	Nominated	

=== Black Reel Awards ===
The Black Reel Awards, or "BRAs", is an annual American awards ceremony hosted by the Foundation for the Augmentation of African-Americans in Film (FAAAF) to recognize excellence in African-American, as well as those of African diaspora's cinematic achievements in the around the world film industry as assessed by the Academy's voting membership.

Year	Nominated work	Award	Result	Ref.
2023	Outstanding Variety, Sketch, or Talk – Series or Special	The Jennifer Hudson Show	Nominated	
2024	Outstanding Variety, Sketch, or Talk – Series or Special	The Jennifer Hudson Show	Nominated	

=== GLAAD Media Award ===
The GLAAD Media Award is an accolade bestowed by GLAAD to recognize and honor various branches of the media for their outstanding representations of the lesbian, gay, bisexual, and transgender (LGBT) community and the issues that affect their lives. Hudson has been nominated for three awards and won two.

Year	Nominee	Category	Result	Ref.
2023	The Jennifer Hudson Show	Outstanding Variety or Talk Show Episode	Nominated	
2024	The Jennifer Hudson Show	Outstanding Variety or Talk Show Episode	Won	
2024	Herself	Excellence in Media Award	Won	

=== Kids' Choice Awards ===
The Kids' Choice Awards is an annual awards show that airs on the Nickelodeon television network. The awards honor the year's biggest achievements in music, film, sports, television, fashion, and more, voted by kids.

Year	Nominated work	Award	Result	Ref.
2019	Herself, Kelly Clarkson, Adam Levine and Blake Shelton – The Voice	Favorite TV Judges	Nominated	

=== NAACP Image Awards ===
The NAACP Image Awards is an award presented annually by the American National Association for the Advancement of Colored People to honor outstanding people of color in film, television, music and literature. Hudson has won twelve awards out of twenty-four nominations.

Year	Nominated work	Award	Result	Ref.
2006	Dreamgirls	Outstanding Supporting Actress in a Motion Picture	Won	
2009	The Secret Life of Bees	Outstanding Supporting Actress in a Motion Picture	Nominated	
2009	Herself	Outstanding New Artist	Won	
2009	Herself	Outstanding Female Artist	Nominated	
2009	Herself	Outstanding Duo or Group	Won	
2009	Jennifer Hudson	Outstanding Album	Won	
2009	"Spotlight"	Outstanding Song	Nominated	
2009	"Spotlight"	Outstanding Music Video	Nominated	
2012	Herself	Outstanding Female Artist	Nominated	
2012	I Remember Me	Outstanding Album	Won	
2012	"Where You At"	Outstanding Music Video	Won	
2014	Winnie Mandela	Outstanding Actress in a Motion Picture	Nominated	
2015	Herself	Outstanding Female Artist	Nominated	
2015	JHUD	Outstanding Album	Nominated	
2016	Chi-Raq	Outstanding Supporting Actress in a Motion Picture	Nominated	
2022	Respect	Entertainer of the Year	Won	
2022	Respect	Outstanding Motion Picture (Note: As the executive producer of the film)	Nominated	
2022	Respect	Outstanding Actress in a Motion Picture	Won	
2022	Respect	Outstanding Ensemble Cast in a Motion Picture	Nominated	
2022	"Superstar"	Outstanding Duo, Group or Collaboration (Note: shared with Anthony Hamilton)	Nominated	
2023	Herself	Outstanding Host in a Talk or News / Information (Series or Special)	Won	
2024	The Jennifer Hudson Show	Outstanding Talk Show	Won	
2025	The Jennifer Hudson Show	Outstanding Talk Show	Won	
2025	Herself	Outstanding Host in a Talk or News / Information (Series or Special)	Won	
2026	The Jennifer Hudson Show	Outstanding Talk Series	Won	

=== People’s Choice Awards ===
The People's Choice Awards is an American awards show, recognizing the people and the work of popular culture, voted on by the general public. Hudson has won one award out of seven nominations.

Year	Nominated work	Award	Result	Ref.
2010	Herself	Favorite R&B Artist	Nominated	
2014	Herself	Favorite Humanitarian	Won	
2015	Herself	Favorite R&B Artist	Nominated	
2021	Respect	Drama Movie of the Year	Nominated	
2021	Respect	Female Movie Star of the Year	Nominated	
2021	Respect	Drama Movie Star of the Year	Nominated	
2022	The Jennifer Hudson Show	Daytime Talk Show of 2022	Nominated	
2024	The Jennifer Hudson Show	Daytime Talk Show of the Year	Nominated	

=== Soul Train Awards ===
The Soul Train Music Awards is an annual awards ceremony that was established in 1987 to honor the best in African American music and entertainment. Hudson has received five nominations.

Year	Nominated work	Award	Result	Ref.
2007	Herself	Sammy Davis, Jr. Award for "Entertainer of the Year"	Won	
2009	Herself	Best R&B/Soul Female Artist	Nominated	
2009	"Spotlight"	Best Song of the Year	Nominated	
2011	Herself	Best R&B/Soul Female Artist	Nominated	
2014	Herself	Best R&B/Soul Female Artist	Nominated	

=== Teen Choice Awards ===
The Teen Choice Awards is an annual awards show that airs on the Fox television network. The awards honor the year's biggest achievements in music, film, sports, television, fashion, and more, voted by viewers aged 13 to 20.

Year	Nominated work	Award	Result	Ref.
2007	Dreamgirls	Choice Movie Actress: Drama	Won	
2007	Dreamgirls	Choice Movie: Female Breakout Star	Nominated	
2009	Herself	Choice Music: R&B Artist	Nominated	
2009	"If This Isn’t Love"	Choice Music: R&B Track	Nominated	
2010	Herself	Choice American Idol Alum	Nominated	
2017	Sandy Wexler	Choice Movie Actress: Comedy	Nominated	

=== Critics associations and other awards ===
Year	Nominated work	Association	Category	Result
2007	Dreamgirls			
2007	Dreamgirls	New York Film Critics Circle	Best Supporting Actress	Won
2007	Dreamgirls	New York Film Critics Online	Best Supporting Actress	Won
2007	Dreamgirls	New York Film Critics Online	Best Breakthrough Performer	Won
2007	Dreamgirls	Boston Society of Film Critics	Best Supporting Actress	Runner-up
2007	Dreamgirls	Los Angeles Film Critics Association	Best Supporting Actress	Runner-up
2007	Dreamgirls	Alliance of Women Film Journalists	Best Performance by an Actress or Actor in Support of a Female Protagonist or Female Perspective	Won
2007	Dreamgirls	Dallas–Fort Worth Film Critics Association	Best Supporting Actress	Nominated
2007	Dreamgirls	Central Ohio Film Critics Association	Best Supporting Actress	Won
2007	Dreamgirls	Central Ohio Film Critics Association	Best Breakthrough Performance	Won
2007	Dreamgirls	Chicago Film Critics Association	Best Supporting Actress	Nominated
2007	Dreamgirls	Online Film Critics Society	Best Supporting Actress	Nominated
2007	Dreamgirls	Online Film Critics Society	Breakthrough Performer	Nominated
2007	Dreamgirls	Southeastern Film Critics Association Awards	Best Supporting Actress	Won
2007	Dreamgirls	North Texas Film Critics Association	Best Supporting Actress	Won
2007	Dreamgirls	Oklahoma Film Critics Circle	Best Breakthrough Performance	Won
2007	Dreamgirls	Online Film & Television Association	Best Supporting Actress	Won
2007	Dreamgirls	Online Film & Television Association	Best Breakthrough Performance: Female	Won
2007	Dreamgirls	Online Film & Television Association	Best Music, Adapted Song (Note: for "I Am Changing")	Won
2007	Dreamgirls	Online Film & Television Association	Best Music, Original Song (Note: for "Love You I Do")	Nominated
2007	Dreamgirls	Washington D.C. Area Film Critics Association	Best Supporting Actress	Won
2007	Dreamgirls	Washington D.C. Area Film Critics Association	Best Breakthrough Performance	Won
2007	Dreamgirls	African-American Film Critics Association	Best Supporting Actress	Won
2007	Dreamgirls	Palm Springs International Film Festival	Breakthrough Performance	Won
2007	Dreamgirls	Las Vegas Film Critics Association	Best Supporting Actress	Won
2007	Dreamgirls	Florida Film Critics Circle	Best Supporting Actress	Nominated
2007	Dreamgirls	Florida Film Critics Circle	Pauline Kael Breakout Award	Won
2007	Dreamgirls	ShoWest Convention	Female Star of Tomorrow	Won
2007	Dreamgirls	Oklahoma Film Critics Circle	Best Supporting Actress	Nominated
2007	Dreamgirls	Oklahoma Film Critics Circle	Breakout Performance	Won
2007	Dreamgirls	National Society of Film Critics	Best Supporting Actress	Runner-up
2007	Dreamgirls	St. Louis Gateway Film Critics Association	Best Supporting Actress	Won
2007	Dreamgirls	Phoenix Film Critics Society	Breakout Performance of the Year - On Screen	Won
2007	Dreamgirls	Austin Film Critics Association	Best Supporting Actress	Nominated
2007	Dreamgirls	Austin Film Critics Association	Breakout Artist	Won
2007	Dreamgirls	Toronto Film Critics Association	Best Supporting Actress	Nominated
2007	Dreamgirls	TV Land Awards	Big Screen Star of the Year	Won
2013	Winnie Mandela	Women Film Critics Circle	Best Actress	Nominated
2013	Winnie Mandela	Women Film Critics Circle	Best Song	Won
2014	Black Nativity	Acapulco Black Film Festival	Best Ensemble Cast	Nominated
2015	Empire	Online Film & Television Association	Best Guest Actress in a Drama Series	Won
2022	Respect	African-American Film Critics Association	Best Actress	Won
2022	Respect	AACTA International Awards	Best Actress	Nominated
2022	Respect	Black Film Critics Circle	Best Actress	Runner-up
2022	Respect	Detroit Film Critics Society	Best Actress	Nominated
2022	Respect	Sunset Circle Awards	Best Actress	Nominated
2022	Respect	Savannah Film Festival	Virtuoso Award	Won
2022	Respect	Women's Image Network Awards	Outstanding Actress in a Feature Film	Nominated

== Producing ==
=== Daytime Emmy Awards ===
The Daytime Emmy Awards, is an American accolade bestowed by the New York City–based National Academy of Television Arts and Sciences in recognition of excellence in American daytime television programming. The first ceremony was held in 1974, expanding what was originally a primetime-themed Emmy Award. Ceremonies generally are held in May or June.

Year	Nominated work	Award	Result	Ref.
2021	Baba Yaga	Outstanding Interactive Media for a Daytime Program	Won	
2023	The Jennifer Hudson Show	Outstanding Daytime Talk Series	Nominated	
2024	The Jennifer Hudson Show	Outstanding Daytime Talk Series	Nominated	
2025	The Jennifer Hudson Show	Outstanding Daytime Talk Series	Nominated	
2025	The Jennifer Hudson Show	Outstanding Daytime Talk Series Host	Nominated	

=== Drama League Awards ===
Year	Nominated work	Category	Result	Ref.
2022	A Strange Loop	Outstanding Production of a Musical	Won	

=== Tony Award ===
Year	Nominated work	Category	Result	Ref.
2022	A Strange Loop	Best Musical	Won	
