= Michael Jackson memorial service =

2009 memorial service

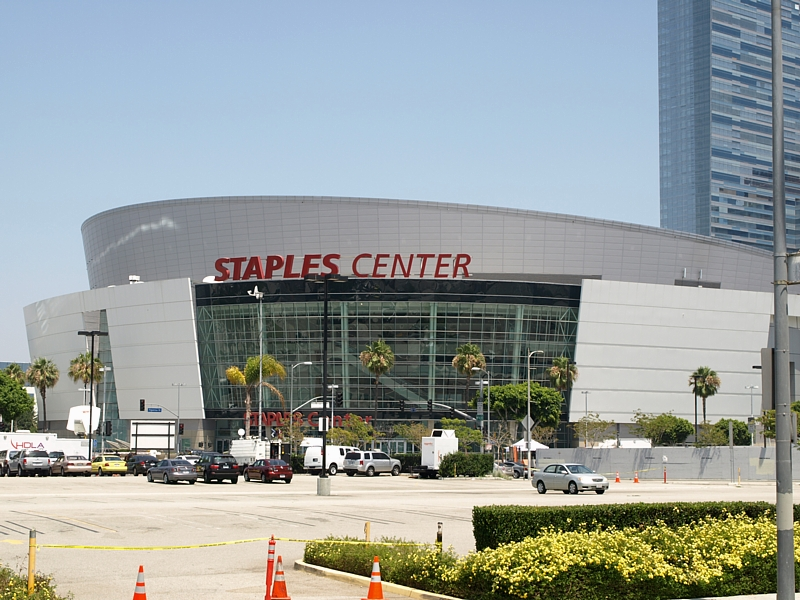
- Held at Staples Center, where Michael Jackson was rehearsing at the time of his death
- Date: July 7, 2009
- Location: Staples Center, Los Angeles, California, United States
- Participants: Rev. Lucius Smith, Smokey Robinson, Mariah Carey, Macaulay Culkin, Trey Lorenz, Queen Latifah, Lionel Richie, John Mayer, Stevie Wonder, Kobe Bryant, Magic Johnson, Jennifer Hudson, Berry Gordy, Rev. Jesse Jackson, Rev. Al Sharpton, Brooke Shields, Jermaine Jackson, Martin Luther King III, Bernice King, Sheila Jackson Lee, Usher, Shaheen Jafargholi, Kenny Ortega, Judith Hill, Marlon Jackson, Janet Jackson, Paris Jackson, Orianthi Panagaris

A public memorial service for Michael Jackson was held on July 7, 2009, at the Staples Center in Los Angeles, California, twelve days after his death. The event was preceded by a private family service at Forest Lawn Memorial Park's Hall of Liberty in Hollywood Hills, and followed by a gathering in Beverly Hills for Jackson's family and close friends.

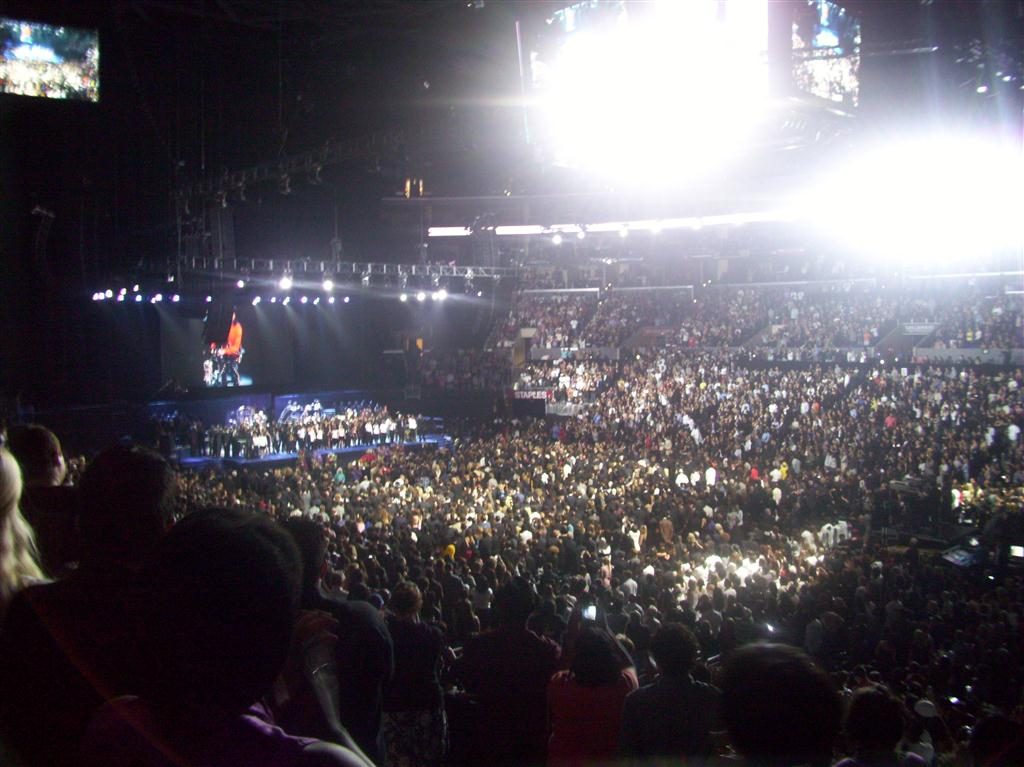
Inside the service

Jackson's closed, solid-bronze casket, plated with 14-karat gold and lined with blue velvet, which was not originally expected to be at the memorial service, arrived just before 10:00 a.m. local time when it was placed in front of the stage. The memorial began a few minutes after 10:30 a.m. with music and a eulogy from Pastor Lucious Smith. The stage was filled with floral arrangements, with photographs and film of Jackson and the Jackson 5 projected onto screens at the back. Music and video montages traced his life from the beginning of his career to the end.

Jackson's brothers, sitting in the front row, each wore a single white sequined glove in tribute to their brother. Mariah Carey, Stevie Wonder, Lionel Richie, Jennifer Hudson, Usher, Jermaine Jackson, and Shaheen Jafargholi sang Jackson's songs, and John Mayer played guitar. Berry Gordy, Brooke Shields, and Smokey Robinson gave eulogies, while Queen Latifah read "We Had Him", a poem written for the occasion by Maya Angelou.

Toward the end, the family gathered on stage to offer the final eulogies. Jackson's then-11-year-old daughter, Paris, while unable to give her speech without crying, told the crowd, "I just want to say, ever since I was born, Daddy has been the best father you could ever imagine, and I just want to say I love him... so much." Additionally, an emotional Marlon Jackson said, "Maybe now, Michael, they will leave you alone," and requested that Jackson give their brother Brandon (Marlon's twin, who died shortly after birth) a hug for him.

== Background ==
The memorial service was organized by Jackson's concert promoter, AEG Live, and AEG Ehrlich Ventures, LLC (Kenneth Ehrlich, executive producer), who gave away 17,500 free tickets to fans worldwide through an online lottery that attracted over 1.2 million applicants in 24 hours, and over a half-billion hits to the webpage. An estimated 750,000 up to a million fans were expected to congregate outside Staples Center but due to Los Angeles' $530 million budget crisis, city and police officials urged fans to stay home. Streets and highway exits around the Staples Center were sealed off, and 3,000 officers, the largest security effort planned since the 1984 Olympics, were on duty at a cost of $1.4 million to the city.

The motorcade for Jackson's casket was headed by two police motorcycle outriders, and the LA freeways were closed for the journey of approximately 11 miles (18 km) from Forest Lawn to the Staples Center. The service was broadcast live around the world. The official United States viewership was extremely high taking into consideration that the service was unusually held on a workday (Tuesday) and that many people reported watching the service during work (which would not have been tabulated into viewing statistics).

== Service ==
The service began with Smokey Robinson reading messages of condolences from Diana Ross and former South African President Nelson Mandela. A gospel choir sang Andrae Crouch's "Soon and Very Soon" as Jackson's casket entered (culminating around the line "We are going to see the King"), followed by statements from Pastor Lucious Smith. Mariah Carey and Trey Lorenz then sang "I'll Be There", a No. 1 single for both the Jackson 5 and Carey and Lorenz. This was followed by a statement from Queen Latifah, who also read "We Had Him", a poem written by Maya Angelou for the occasion. Lionel Richie, Jackson's friend and his co-writer on "We Are the World", performed the song "Jesus Is Love" by the Commodores. In the eulogy of Berry Gordy, founder of Motown Records, he stated, "In fact, the more I think and talk about Michael Jackson, I feel the King of Pop is not big enough for him. I think he is simply the greatest entertainer that ever lived." The statement was met with the longest standing ovation of the service.

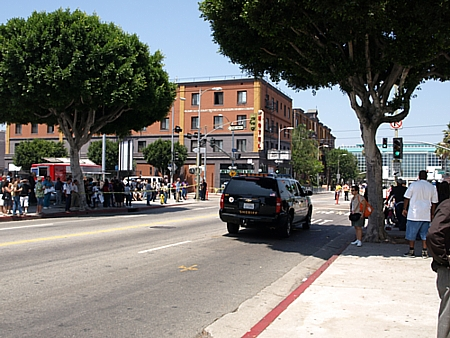
A crowd of spectators gathering outside the Staples Center during the memorial service

A video montage of Michael Jackson's life followed. Stevie Wonder spoke, played a small portion of "I Can't Help It", a song from Off the Wall that Wonder co-wrote, then performed a version of his songs "Never Dreamed You'd Leave in Summer" and "They Won't Go When I Go". Next, Kobe Bryant spoke about Jackson's humanitarian work, and Magic Johnson (who had appeared in the music video for "Remember the Time") recalled his memories of Jackson. Accompanied by a dancing chorus along with the dancers who would have been on stage for the O2 concerts, Jennifer Hudson performed "Will You Be There", originally recorded for Jackson's album Dangerous and later used as the theme song for the 1993 film Free Willy. This performance ended with a recording of Jackson's spoken-word section that closes the song. The Reverend Al Sharpton then spoke and received a standing ovation when he told Jackson's children, "Wasn't nothing strange about your daddy. It was strange what your daddy had to deal with." John Mayer played guitar on a mainly instrumental version of "Human Nature" from Jackson's Thriller. Brooke Shields then spoke about the personal time she spent with Jackson, read excerpts from The Little Prince, and said that his favorite song was Charlie Chaplin's "Smile", which was then performed by Jermaine Jackson.

Martin Luther King Jr.'s children, Martin III and Bernice, then stated that Jackson was the best that he could be. Sheila Jackson Lee (D-Texas, Houston), representing the United States House of Representatives, emphasized that in the US, people are "innocent until proven guilty" (as the crowd cheered) then spoke about his "American story" plus his meetings with foreign diplomats, and that "Michael never stopped giving". She then went on to claim him as an American legend and world humanitarian (House Resolution 600), closing her speech with a military salute as she said, "Michael Jackson, I salute you." Usher walked to the casket and then sang Larry Grossman and Buzz Kohan's "Gone Too Soon", which Jackson recorded as a tribute for Ryan White after his death; Usher cried near the end of the song as he placed his hand on the casket, but managed to finish. Following Usher, a clip from The Ed Sullivan Show in 1969 featuring the Jackson 5's rendition of the Miracles' "Who's Lovin' You" was shown. Following this, the song's composer and Miracles lead singer, Smokey Robinson, spoke about and made joking remarks about the Jackson 5 covering his song, and continued with a speech. Shaheen Jafargholi from Britain's Got Talent then performed the song.

Jackson choreographer Kenny Ortega presented Jafargholi, honored Jackson, and introduced the final performance of the memorial, which Jackson had been slated to perform during the This Is It dates. The concerts' chorus singers, Darrell Phinnessee, Ken Stacey, Dorian Holley, Judith Hill and guitarist Orianthi performed "We Are the World" and were joined on the stage by several of the guest speakers and performers as well as the Jackson family for the final chorus. With the entire group still on stage, Hill then led a performance of "Heal the World", with the remainder of the group joining in the chorus. Jackson's family then addressed the crowd. Jermaine—who had earlier performed a tearful rendition of "Smile"—gave a brief speech, followed by a eulogy by Marlon, where he tributed his twin brother Brandon, who died shortly after birth, telling his younger brother to "give him a hug" for himself as a favor. Marlon then handed the microphone over to Janet, but in a move that came as a surprise to the show's organizers, she said that her niece, Paris, had something to say. Surrounded by her paternal aunts and uncles, Paris emotionally addressed the crowd before collapsing into tears and being escorted off the stage by her family. She said, "I just want to say, ever since I was born, Daddy has been the best father you could ever imagine...and I just want to say I love him... so much."

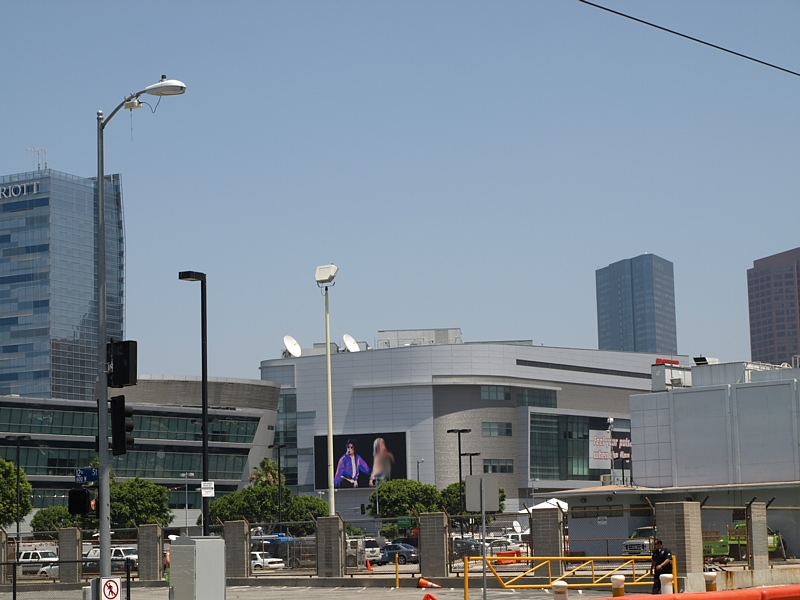
Outside the Staples Center during the memorial service

Marlon Jackson then thanked the crowd in attendance, and the family escorted the casket out of the arena while an instrumental version of "Man in the Mirror" was performed. A microphone placed center stage was lit by a spotlight while the instrumental version of "Man in the Mirror" played out, symbolizing the 'absence' of Jackson. Many in the crowd applauded and cheered as Jackson's coffin was carried out of the building. Pastor Lucious Smith closed the service with a prayer and quote saying "I'm alive and I'm here forever" from the Paul McCartney/Michael Jackson duet song "The Man". The memorial was finished at 12:48 p.m. Before broadcast of the service ended, a final slideshow of photos starting with Jackson's childhood and concluding with his final years played with Mariah Carey's version of "I'll Be There" playing.

=== Guest list ===
The participants were Ron Boyd (family friend), Los Angeles Lakers greats Magic Johnson and Kobe Bryant, fellow Motown Records alumni Berry Gordy, Lionel Richie, Smokey Robinson, and Stevie Wonder, Mariah Carey, Andrae Crouch (choir), Queen Latifah, Judith Hill (recruited 'This Is It' performer), Jennifer Hudson (in her first public appearance since the double murder of her brother and nephew nine months earlier), Shaheen Jafargholi (a child finalist on the third season of Britain's Got Talent, who sang Jackson's song, "Who's Lovin' You" and was originally invited to perform with Jackson in one of This Is It series concerts, due to be held in London), Martin Luther King III, Bernice A. King, John Mayer, Omer Bhatti (a Norwegian rapper), Rev. Al Sharpton, Brooke Shields, Pastor Lucious Smith (family friend), Lil' Kim, and Usher.

In addition to the above persons, ABC News reported, Lionel Richie's daughter Nicole, who was Jackson's goddaughter, singer Akon and producer/rapper Sean Combs would attend the services. Jackson's nephew Taj Jackson later said on Twitter that Wade Robson begged to come to the memorial and brought in his family there proving it with screenshots of text messages with Robson.

Debbie Rowe, Jackson's ex-wife and mother of two of his three children, hoping not to be a distraction, did not attend the memorial. Elizabeth Taylor and Diana Ross, two of Jackson's closest friends, as well as Quincy Jones, Eliza Jackson Duphrey and Ivonne Ester Duphrey (Jackson's cousins) also did not attend. Whitney Houston was not able to attend the service either.

=== Casket ===
Jackson was presented in a polished solid bronze Promethean casket with gold-plated hardware, furnished by the Batesville Casket Company, which cost roughly $25,000. It is similar to the one in which James Brown was buried. The closed casket at the Staples Center was decorated with red roses and Bells of Ireland flower arrangement. The casket was escorted by Jackson's brothers, each wearing a single sequined white glove on the hand in which they held the casket. Jackson was originally to be buried on what would have been his 51st birthday; however, the services were postponed, and he was instead interred at Forest Lawn Memorial Park in Glendale on September 3, 2009. Ex-wife Lisa Marie Presley was among those in attendance for this service.

=== Live broadcast ===
The broadcast was prioritized by many media companies all over the world, and all other programming apart from the memorial was suspended. The service was broadcast live around the world, from the U.S. to Slovakia (Eastern Europe) to parts of Asia and Oceania, making use of the Intelsat global satellite network. Public screenings were held in 88 cinemas across the U.S. as well as in Barcelona, Berlin, Brussels, Bucharest, Gothenburg, Lisbon, London, Madrid, Malmö, Oslo, Paris, Milan, Seville, Stockholm, and Tallinn. There was also a live broadcast at 3am in Melbourne, Australia, at Federation Square. Before the event, the organizers expected an estimated one billion viewers. According to Nielsen, 31.1 million Americans watched the service live on television, an amount comparable to the 35.1 million that watched the state funeral of Ronald Reagan in 2004, while over 59.5 million U.S. viewers tuned in via streaming. It was estimated that more than 2.5 billion people watched the event worldwide, which makes it the most watched non-sports television broadcast in history.

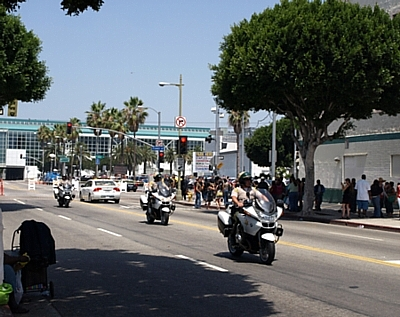
Los Angeles County Sheriff's Department motorcycle detail patrolling the perimeter of the Staples Center during the memorial service

As a point of comparison to notable non-funeral-related events, the first inauguration of Barack Obama in 2009 garnered about 38 million viewers, and the opening ceremony of the 2008 Summer Olympics garnered about 34.2 million viewers in the U.S. alone. In the United Kingdom, BBC reported that 5.2 million people watched the memorial service on the network BBC2, and 2 million more watched it on the British networks Five and Sky News. According to market research company Media Control in Germany, more than 20 million people – almost a quarter of the country’s population of 83 million – saw the live transmission as well as other reports related to the funeral on more than 10 TV channels. According to audience measurement company Mediametrie in France, around 10 million people watched coverage of the memorial service and more than a 50% audience share. In India, the memorial garnered 4 million views through various Hindi channels. The memorial attracted 18.7 million viewers in Brazil and 7 million viewers in Japan as well.

The memorial service is the most-watched in online streaming history. According to Internet monitoring firm Akamai Technologies the Global Web traffic ranged from 19 percent to 33 percent above normal during the service. CNN's webcast drew at least 9.7 million streams, and their feed on Ustream drew 4.6 million streams; MSNBC's feed via Justin.tv drew an additional 3 million. Yahoo News had 5 million live video streams, according to the publication Media Life. The publication also reported that FoxNews.com and MSNBC.com combined for 6.4 million video streams.

=== Media coverage ===
According to Global Language Monitor, the coverage from Jackson's death and aftermath of his funeral surpassed the coverage of the funeral of Pope John Paul II as "No. 1 media" (noting the longer timeframe and contentious circumstances re the former), in that the event was the most widely covered funeral from an analysis of 5,000 "print and electronic media sites" over a twelve-year period (the analysis excludes blogs and social media).

=== Cost ===
Due to the economic downturn concerns at the time, the city of Los Angeles said the memorial had cost the city $1.4 million for 1,400 police officers, trash pick-up, sanitation, and traffic control. The city set up a webpage asking fans for donations to help with the expenses, though it kept crashing. City Attorney Carmen Trutanich said it would be wrong to expect taxpayers to finance a private event. "The city attorney does not want something like this happening again, the city paying for a private event," spokesman John Franklin told CNN. "That's especially in a cash-strapped city, where people have been furloughed or even lost jobs."
