= Jason Hudson =

Jason Hudson may refer to:

- Jason Hudson, murdered in 2008, see Murder of Jason Hudson
- Jason Hudson, a character in the Call of Duty: Black Ops series
- Jason Hudson (rugby league) (born 1973), Australian rugby league footballer
