= Giving Myself =

Single by Jennifer Hudson

from the album Jennifer Hudson
- Released: June 2, 2009
- Genre: Soul; pop
- Length: 4:15
- Label: Arista, J
- Songwriter: Robin Thicke
- Producers: Robin Thicke, Pro Jay

Jennifer Hudson singles chronology
"If This Isn't Love" (2009)	"Giving Myself" (2009)	"Where You At" (2011)

"Giving Myself" is a song recorded by American singer Jennifer Hudson. It was written and produced by singer-songwriter Robin Thicke, along with his frequent co-producer Pro Jay, for her eponymous debut album, released in 2008. An eleventh hour replacement for Timbaland-produced "Pocketbook", the pop–soul ballad was selected as the album's third and final single and sent to US radios on June 2, 2009. Upon release, it charted at number 84 on the US Billboard Hot R&B/Hip-Hop Songs chart.

== Background ==
"Giving Myself" is a pop–soul ballad written and produced by Robin Thicke, with co-production helmed by frequent collaborator Pro Jay. Tony Reyes played the guitar and Larry Cox the organ while Thicke and Jay contributed Backing vocals and drums. Rich Travali mixed the track, while audio recording of "Giving Myself" was overseen by Bill Molina. A slightly different arrangement of the song was released as the single, with the original arraignment only made available through the physical version of the album. Speaking about what motivated her to record the song, Hudson said: "It's unexpected from me, but it still is me. I love how [Thicke] allowed me to be me but introduced another side. He introduced a more vulnerable side vocally, but yet he put it with the ballad side of Jennifer." In an interview with E! Online, Thicke also elaborated on the recording process, stating: "Luckily, her voice is ready to go at all times. She showed up, I had this great little song in the spirit of Whitney Houston, and she sat down next to me and I started singing it for her, and she loved it right off the bat. We got her behind the microphone and she Jennifer Hudson-ed it."

== Critical reception ==
Joey Guerra from Houston Chronicle felt that "Thicke's 'Giving Myself' is a nice surprise, an old-school diva ballad a la Stephanie Mills, Jennifer Holliday and Patti LaBelle, while The Washington Post's J. Freedom du Lac found, the song was "an emotional, devotional soul showcase, a classic piano ballad designed to show off Hudson’s big, brassy voice." Digital Spy, on the other hand, called "Giving Myself" a "boring, sappy love song," which along with "You Pulled Me Through", "don't seem to belong on the same album as 'Pocketbook'."

== Credits and personnel ==
Credits adapted from the liner notes of Jennifer Hudson.

- Songwriting – Robin Thicke
- Production – Robin Thicke, Pro Jay
- Recording – Bill Molina
- Backing vocals – Robin Thicke
- Drums – Pro Jay
- Guitar – Tony Reyes
- Organ – Larry Cox
- Mixing – Rich Travali
- Mastering – Chris Gehringer

== Chart performance ==
=== Weekly charts ===
Chart (2009)	Peak position
US Hot R&B/Hip-Hop Songs (Billboard)	84
