= Jennifer Hudson =

American singer and actress (born 1981)

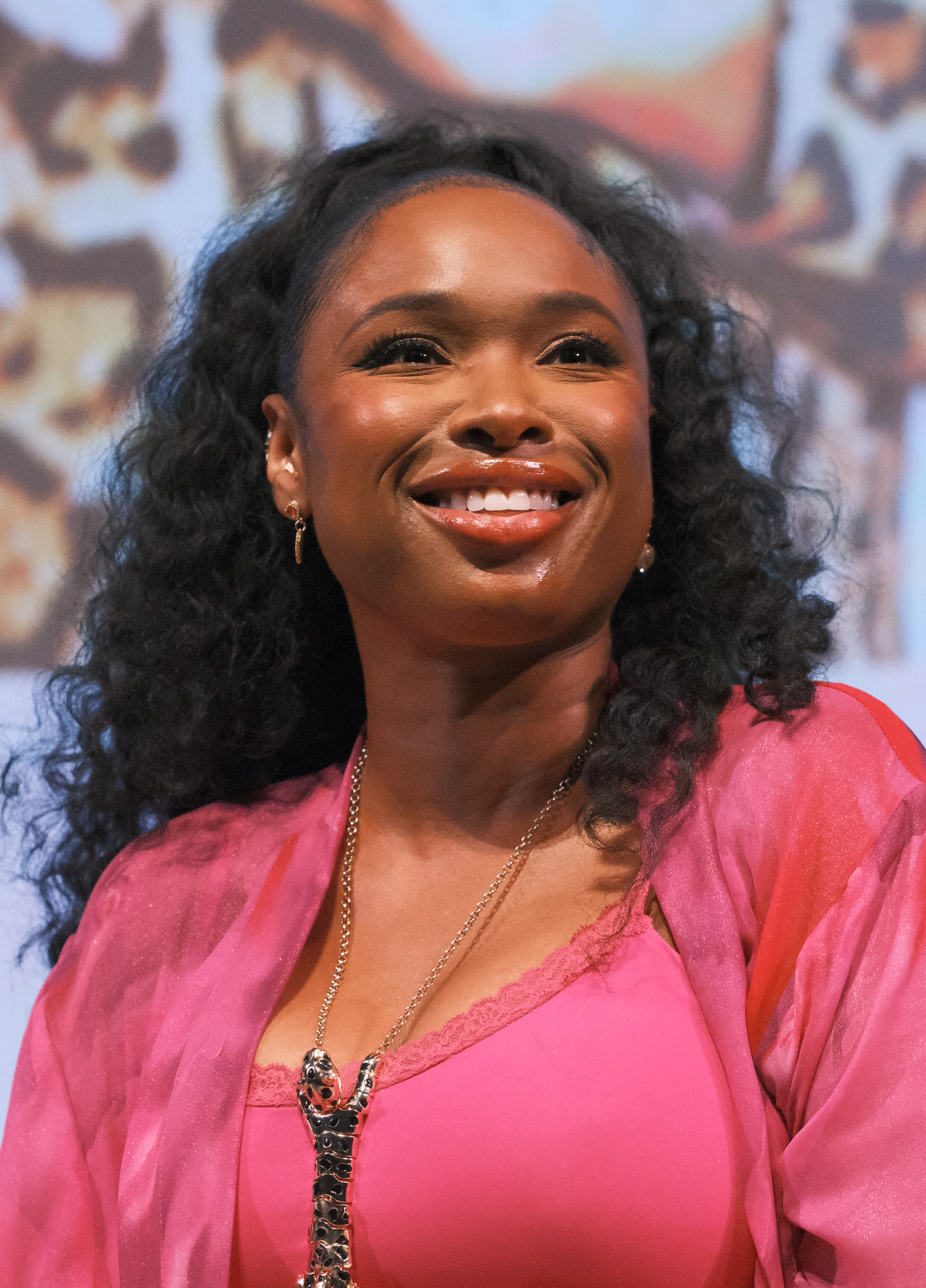
- Hudson in 2025
- Born: Jennifer Kate Hudson; September 12, 1981 (age 45); Chicago, Illinois, U.S.
- Other name: J.Hud
- Occupations: Singer; actress; producer; television presenter
- Years active: 2004–present
- Works: Discography; filmography
- Partners: James Payton (1999–2007); David Otunga (2007–2017); Common (2022–present)
- Children: 1
- Mother: Darnell Donerson
- Awards: Full list
- Musical career
- Genres: R&B; soul; gospel
- Instrument: Vocals
- Labels: Arista; J; RCA; Epic; Interscope

Jennifer Kate Hudson (born September 12, 1981), also known by her nickname J.Hud, is an American singer and actress. Having received numerous accolades for her work in music, film, television, and theater, Hudson became the youngest woman and third African-American recipient of all four major American entertainment awards: Emmy, Grammy, Oscar, and Tony (EGOT) in 2022. She was inducted into the Hollywood Walk of Fame in 2013, and Time named her one of the 100 most influential people in the world in 2020.

Hudson rose to fame in 2004 as a finalist on the third season of the reality series American Idol, wherein she placed seventh. She signed with Arista Records to release her self-titled debut studio album (2008), which peaked at number two on the Billboard 200 and won Best R&B Album at the 51st Annual Grammy Awards. Her second and third studio albums, I Remember Me (2011) and JHUD (2014), both peaked within the top ten of the Billboard 200; the latter was released by RCA Records. She signed with Interscope Records to release her fourth album, The Gift of Love (2024), her first solo project in a decade.

She made her film debut as Effie White in the musical Dreamgirls (2006), for which she won the Academy Award for Best Supporting Actress and became the youngest African-American recipient of the award. She has since portrayed Aretha Franklin in the musical biopic Respect (2021) and acted in films such as Sex and the City (2008), The Secret Life of Bees (2008), Winnie Mandela (2011), Black Nativity (2013), Sing (2016), Cats (2019), and Goat (2026). She also has appeared in shows such as Smash (2012), Empire (2015) and Confirmation (2016).

On stage, she acted in the Broadway musical revival The Color Purple (2015) and won the Tony Award for Best Musical as a producer of A Strange Loop (2022). Hudson has served as a coach on both the British and the American versions of the reality series The Voice from 2017 to 2019, and became the first female coach to lead a winning team on the former. In 2022, her talk show, The Jennifer Hudson Show, premiered.

== Early life and education ==
Jennifer Kate Hudson was born on September 12, 1981, in Chicago, Illinois. She is the third and youngest child of Darnell Donerson and Samuel Simpson, a Greyhound Lines bus driver. She, her older sister Julia, a school bus driver, and her brother Jason Hudson, were raised primarily by their mother. Her father was absent from her childhood until, with the blessing of her mother, she went looking for him at age 14. When Hudson found her father, she learned that he had 26 other children. She has stated she has still not met all of her half-siblings.

She was raised as a Baptist in Englewood on the South Side and attended Dunbar Vocational High School, from which she graduated in 1999.

She cites Whitney Houston, Aretha Franklin, and Patti LaBelle as her overall biggest influences and inspiration. She has also credited Mariah Carey as being one of her musical "heroes". At age seven she got her start in performing by singing with the church choir and doing community theater with the help of her late maternal grandmother, Julia. She enrolled at Langston University but she left after a semester due to homesickness and unhappiness with the weather, and registered at Kennedy–King College.

In January 2002, Hudson signed her first recording contract with Righteous Records, a Chicago-based independent record label. She was released from her contract with Righteous Records so that she could appear on American Idol in 2004.

== Career ==
=== 2004–2005: American Idol ===
Hudson auditioned for the third season of American Idol in Atlanta. After commenting that she had been singing on Disney Cruise Lines (aboard the Disney Wonder) for the past few months as one of the Muses from Hercules, judge Randy Jackson told her, "We're expecting more than a cruise ship performance from you." Hudson received the highest number of votes in the "Top 9" after her performance of Elton John's "Circle of Life" on April 6, 2004, but two weeks later, she was eliminated during the "Top 7" show after performing Barry Manilow's, "Weekend in New England". In May 2009, MTV listed Hudson as the sixth-greatest contestant in American Idol history and noted her exit was the most shocking of all time. In May 2010, the Los Angeles Times claimed Hudson to be the third-greatest Idol contestant in the history of the show, placing behind season one winner Kelly Clarkson and season four winner Carrie Underwood, respectively.

==== Performances ====
Theme week	Song sung	Artist
Audition	Share Your Love With Me	Aretha Franklin
Semifinals	Imagine	John Lennon
Wild Card	I Believe in You and Me	Four Tops; Whitney Houston
Top 12; Soul Music Week	Baby, I Love You	Aretha Franklin
Top 11; Country Week	No One Else on Earth	Wynonna Judd
Top 10; Motown Week	(Love Is Like A) Heat Wave	Martha and the Vandellas
Top 9 Songs of Elton John	Circle of Life	Elton John
Top 8 Songs of the Cinema	I Have Nothing from The Bodyguard	Whitney Houston
Top 7 Songs of Barry Manilow	Weekend in New England	Barry Manilow

=== 2006–2007: Dreamgirls and breakthrough ===
In one of her first appearances on a record, Hudson is featured in a duet, "The Future Ain't What It Used to Be", on Meat Loaf's Bat Out of Hell III: The Monster Is Loose. In September 2006, Hudson performed the song, "Over It", live on Fox Chicago Morning News. In the interview she stated the song would be included on her debut album, to be released in early 2007; however, this was before she was signed to a record label. In November 2006, Hudson signed a record deal with Arista Records. Hudson also recorded a song she co-wrote with Bill Grainer and Earl Powell called "Stand Up", which was available for preview on her fan website. The track was produced by Chicago natives Powell and Herman Little III, who also arranged the song. The power-ballad would later become available on the deluxe edition of Hudson's self-titled album as a bonus track.

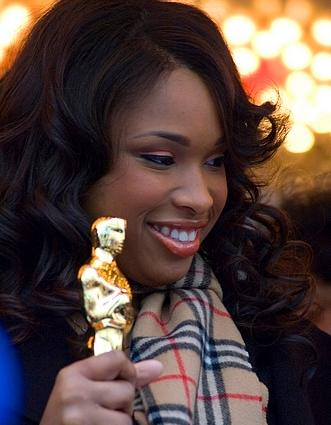
Hudson holding her Academy Award in 2007

In November 2005, Hudson was cast in the role of Effie White for the film adaptation of the musical Dreamgirls, which also starred Jamie Foxx, Beyoncé Knowles and Eddie Murphy. The role marked Hudson's debut screen performance. She won the role over hundreds of professional singers and actresses, including Fantasia Barrino. Filming of Dreamgirls began on January 9, 2006, and the film went into limited release on December 25, 2006, and national release on January 12, 2007. Hudson has won particular praise for her show-stopping onscreen rendition of the hit song, "And I Am Telling You I'm Not Going", the signature song of the role, which had earlier been recorded, and had already reached the status of musical standard, because of the definitive performance of Jennifer Holliday. The New York Observer described Hudson's performance of the song as "five mellifluous, molto vibrato minutes that have suddenly catapulted Ms. Hudson... into the position of front-runner for the best supporting actress Oscar". Newsweek said that when moviegoers hear Hudson sing the song, she, "is going to raise goose bumps across the land." Variety magazine wrote that Hudson's performance "calls to mind debuts like Barbra Streisand in Funny Girl or Bette Midler in The Rose, with a voice like the young Aretha". "Love You I Do" was nominated for the 2007 Academy Award for Best Original Song and won the 2008 Grammy Award for Best Song Written for a Motion Picture, Television or Other Visual Media.

As Effie White, Hudson received 29 awards from film critics as Best Supporting Actress and Breakthrough Performer of 2006. She won the Golden Globe Award as Best Actress in a Supporting Role. In addition, she was named Best Supporting Actress by the Broadcast Film Critics Association and also by the Screen Actors Guild. After seeing Hudson's performance in Dreamgirls, Simon Cowell taped a congratulatory message to her, which aired on The Oprah Winfrey Show. With the March 2007 issue, Jennifer Hudson became the third African-American celebrity and the first African-American singer to grace the cover of Vogue magazine. On February 11, 2007, the 60th British Academy Film Awards were held in London, but Hudson was not there to accept her BAFTA Award for Best Actress in a Supporting Role. The BAFTA Award went missing and Hudson did not receive her award until April 22, 2011, when it was presented to her on the Graham Norton Show.

On February 25, 2007, she won the Academy Award for Best Supporting Actress for her role in the film. Later in 2007, the mayor of her home town, Chicago, Richard M. Daley, declared March 6 as "Jennifer Hudson Day". She was invited to join the Academy of Motion Picture Arts and Sciences on June 18, along with 115 other individuals for 2007. Entertainment Weekly put her performance on its end-of-the-decade, "best-of" list, saying, "Sure, Beyoncé's performance was great. And Eddie Murphy's was impressive. But there was really only one reason we all rushed to see 2006's Dreamgirls: Jennifer Hudson's soul-to-the-rafters rendition of the classic 'And I'm Telling You I'm Not Going'. When she sang 'You're gonna love me,' it wasn't just a lyric — it was a fact."

=== 2008–2009: Jennifer Hudson album and films ===
In May 2008, Hudson appeared in the feature film Sex and the City as Louise, Carrie Bradshaw's assistant. Filming finished in December 2007 and the movie was released on May 30, 2008. In October 2008, Hudson appeared in The Secret Life of Bees as Rosaleen. The film also received nine Black Reel Awards nominations including three wins. Hudson was nominated for her performance in the film, but lost to Queen Latifah. The film also received eight nominations at the 2009 NAACP Image Awards, including a nomination for Hudson for her performance.

In 2009, Hudson starred as Kathy Archenault in Fragments, a film based on the novel by Roy Freirich, with Dakota Fanning and Forest Whitaker. It was released on DVD on August 4, 2009. In 2010, Hudson started filming the biopic film Winnie Mandela based on the South African politician Winnie Mandela starring alongside Terrence Howard and directed by Darrell J. Roodt. Andre Pieterse and Roodt and Paul L. Johnson based the film's script on Anne Marie du Preez Bezdrob's biography, Winnie Mandela: A Life. The Creative Workers Union of South Africa have opposed this choice, stating they will push for a moratorium on the film if the casting is not reversed. Winnie Mandela has threatened legal action over this film, claiming she was not "consulted" about the film. Winnie Mandela was originally scheduled to be released in December 2011; the trailer was released in 2010. Image Entertainment released the film on September 6, 2013.

In January 2008, Hudson returned to the studio to record new songs for her debut studio album. Her label was reportedly unhappy with the direction they were sending Hudson musically and decided it would be best to scrap the older songs and instead focus on new ones. Hudson worked with Ryan Tedder and Timbaland on a number of songs. Her debut single, "Spotlight" was released on June 10, 2008, and became Hudson's first top 40 hit peaking at number 24 on the Billboard Hot 100 and became a top 20 hit in the United Kingdom and Turkey. Her debut studio album, Jennifer Hudson, was released on September 30, 2008, on Arista and was written by Ne-Yo, who co-produced along with Stargate. Additional contributors on the album include Timbaland, Missy Elliott, Robin Thicke, Harvey Mason, Jr., Diane Warren, Earl Powell, and Christopher "Tricky" Stewart, among others. The album debuted at number two on the Billboard 200 with 217,000 copies in the US and opened to positive reviews. As of August 2009, the album has sold 739,000 copies in the US, receiving a Gold certification for surpassing sales of 500,000. She has performed the song, "All Dressed in Love" for the Sex and the City soundtrack, which was released on May 27, 2008. Hudson performed the national anthem at the 2008 Democratic National Convention.

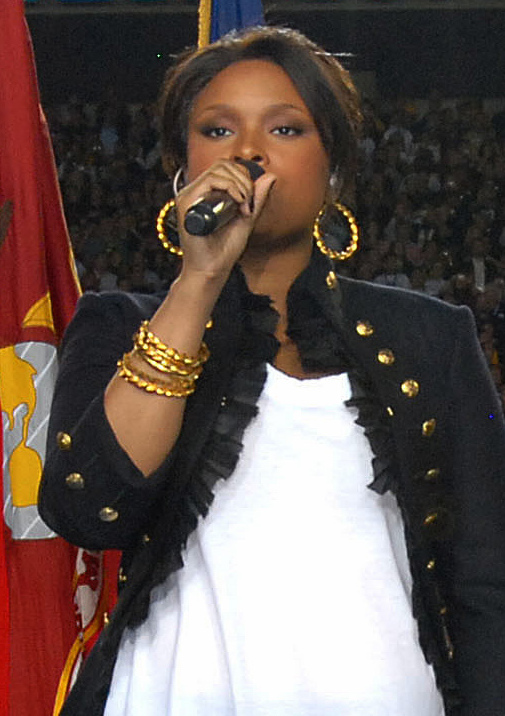
Jennifer Hudson's first public appearance after the murder of three family members, including her mother, sings the "National Anthem" at Super Bowl XLIII

The album's second single was to be released in October 2008, and was originally set to be "My Heart" before "If This Isn't Love" was chosen as the official second single. After three of her family members were brutally murdered, the single was rescheduled for a January 2009 release. However, in January 2009, her label decided to postpone the release of the second single once more, choosing a February 2009 release date. After the release of "If This Isn't Love", the single eventually peaked at number 63 on the Billboard Hot 100 and number 37 on the UK Singles Chart. The third single was "Pocketbook" featuring Ludacris in April 2009, for a June 2009 release, despite speculation that the third single would be "My Heart" after it was canceled as the second single. In May 2009, "Pocketbook" was canceled as the third single due to negative reception from fans and critics alike. The third single was then rescheduled as "Giving Myself" and was released on June 2, 2009, to the US. Her debut album garnered Hudson three nominations at the 2009 Grammy Awards: Best Female R&B Vocal Performance for "Spotlight", Best R&B Performance by a Duo or Group with Vocals for "I'm His Only Woman" with Fantasia Barrino, and Best R&B Album for Jennifer Hudson. She won the last of these and performed at the awards ceremony.

In February 2009, Hudson made her first public appearance since the murders when she sang "The Star-Spangled Banner" at Super Bowl XLIII. She toured the United States with Robin Thicke in 2009. In early May 2009, Hudson suffered "throat fatigue" and had to reschedule her May 16–19, 2009, tour dates. She sang "Will You Be There" at the Michael Jackson memorial service in July 2009. Hudson recorded "Neither One of Us (Wants to Be the First to Say Goodbye)", originally by Gladys Knight & the Pips, for American Idol Season 3: Greatest Soul Classics — the official American Idol album for the third season. She is featured on Ne-Yo's second album, Because of You, on the track, "Leaving Tonight". Hudson performed a Christmas special in December 2009 called Jennifer Hudson: I'll Be Home for Christmas. During the special, she relived her childhood Christmases with musical performances filmed at her favorite locations in her native Chicago. Hudson also visited family members, friends and other childhood influences during the broadcast. On January 22, 2010, Hudson appeared on the telethon "Hope for Haiti Now: A Global Benefit for Earthquake Relief", performing the Beatles' "Let it Be". The telecast generated $61 million in donations as of January 26, 2010. Also, that year, Hudson recorded the song "One Shining Moment" for the 2010 NCAA Men's Division I Basketball Tournament.

=== 2010–2012: Weight Watchers and I Remember Me ===
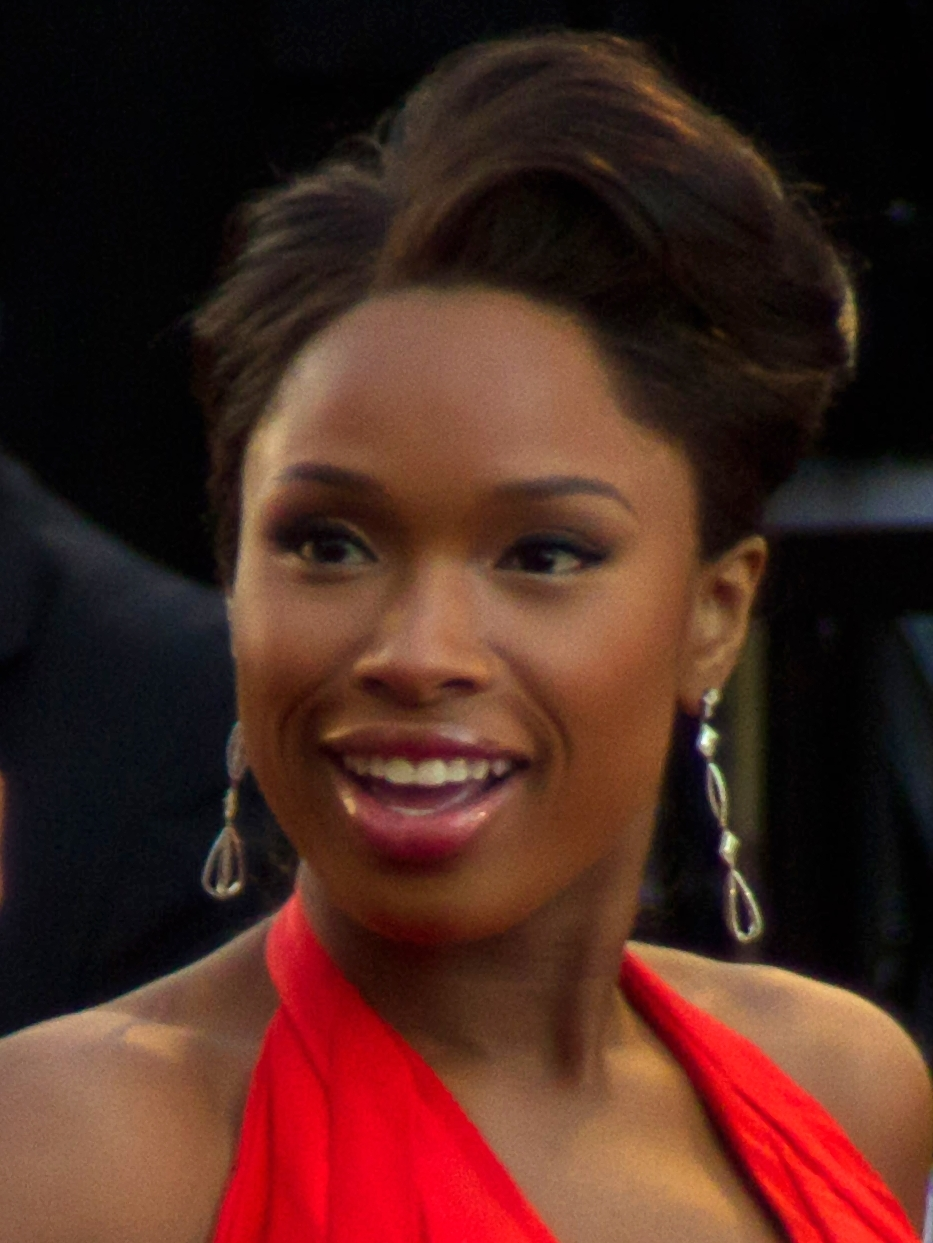
Hudson at the 83rd Academy Awards in 2011

In 2010, Hudson became the spokesperson for Weight Watchers. That year, she had lost 56 pounds (25 kg) and "[did] not want to lose any more weight." However, on February 10, 2011, she appeared on The Oprah Winfrey Show and revealed she had lost a total of 80 pounds. Her 2012 autobiography, I Got This: How I Changed My Ways and Lost What Weighed Me Down, detailed her weight loss.

Early in the album I Remember Me's development, Ne-Yo told E! Online that Hudson was ready to get personal on her second studio album and that he might be producing the album. He said "She's gone through a lot over the last year, so she has a lot to talk about", he continues. "She's definitely gotten stronger. The things that she's gone through and for her to still be upbeat and happy, it's amazing." Hudson released her second studio album I Remember Me on March 22, 2011. It debuted at number two on the Billboard 200 selling 165,000 copies in its first week of release.

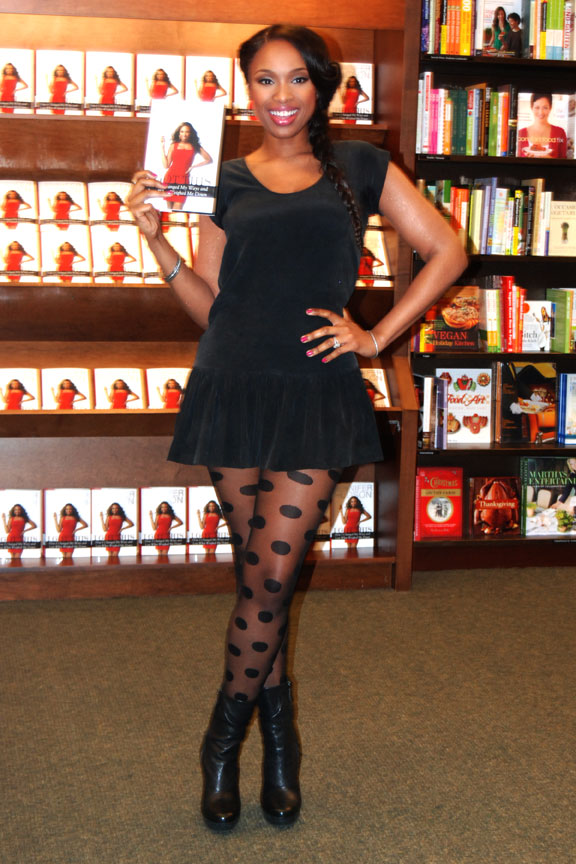
Hudson in 2012

On January 24, 2011, Hudson premiered the album's lead single "Where You At". It was written by R. Kelly and produced by Harvey Mason, Jr. The song went for radio adds that same week. On February 3, 2011, due to radio adds the single made its debut on the US Billboard Hot R&B/Hip-Hop Songs chart at number 53, having so far reached a peak of number 10. The music video premiered on BET's 106 & Park and through Vevo in February 2011. "No One Gonna Love You" impacted on Urban adult contemporary radio in the United States in May 2011. A remix bundle, "No One Gonna Love You-The Remixes", was released as a digital download in the US and the UK in July 2011. The song has reached number 23 on the Hot R&B/Hip-Hop Songs. The third US single will be "I Got This". The non-single track "Don't Look Down" reached number 70 on the US Hot R&B/Hip-Hop Songs chart.

=== 2013–2014: JHUD ===
Hudson played a nun in the Farrelly brothers film The Three Stooges (2012). The day after the death of Whitney Houston, Hudson paid tribute to her by singing Houston's "I Will Always Love You" during the 54th Grammy Awards held on February 12, 2012, at the Staples Center in Los Angeles, California. Hudson guest-starred for a multi-episode arc on the second season of Smash. She sang "America the Beautiful" with the Sandy Hook Elementary School chorus at Super Bowl XLVII. Hudson sang at the 85th Academy Awards in a tribute to musical films. She performed "Same Love" with Macklemore, Ryan Lewis, and Mary Lambert at the 2013 MTV Video Music Awards.

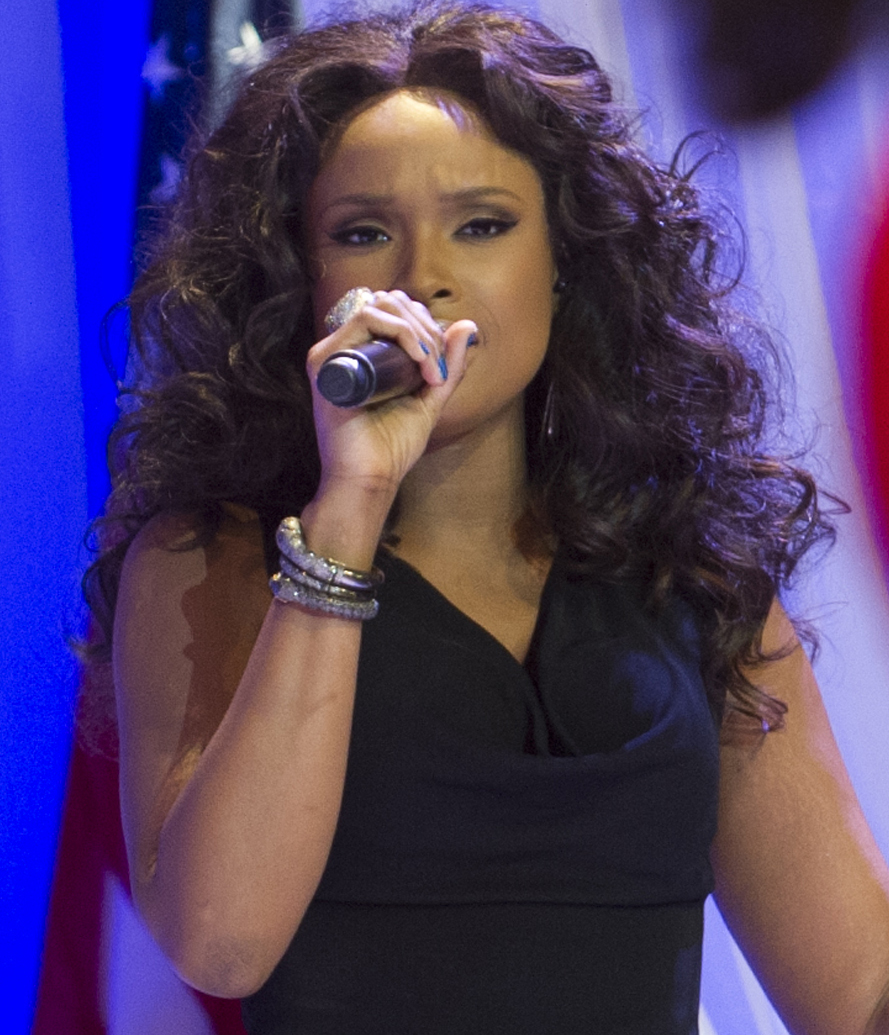
Hudson at the Commander in Chief's Ball at the Washington Convention Center in 2013

On September 21, 2013, a new single from Hudson's forthcoming third studio album was released via her website. The 70s stylized uptempo ballad, "I Can't Describe (The Way I Feel)", features T.I. with production by Pharrell, she performed this song alongside Chaka Khan, Evelyn Champagne King, and T.I. at the 2013 Soul Train Awards. In October 2013, Hudson starred in the coming of age drama The Inevitable Defeat of Mister & Pete alongside Jordin Sparks as well as the drama/musical Black Nativity. Furthermore, she appears alongside Amy Adams in the drama Lullaby. On November 13, 2013, Hudson was awarded with the 2,512th star of the Hollywood Walk of Fame.

Hudson's third studio album, JHUD, was released on September 23, 2014. Hudson described the album as more "upbeat" than her previous material. She worked with Timbaland, Pharrell Williams, RedOne, Iggy Azalea and R. Kelly among others. RedOne said about the material: "It's not dance dance, but it's soulful dance. It's very '70s kinda style". Hudson stated: "What we're doing feels so right that I never want to go home (from the studio). My sister and my manager will be sleeping on the couch while we work until 4 or 5am".

Hudson confirmed that a song on the album will be "It's Your World" and features R. Kelly, in an interview with Jonathan Ross on The Jonathan Ross Show. The track went on to be nominated for Best R&B Vocal Performance at the 2015 Grammy Awards. On June 20, she released the music video for "Walk it Out" featuring Timbaland, which is the first single off her upcoming album. Her third album, JHUD, would include "different expressions of [Hudson] as an artist, a girl, [and] a music lover".

=== 2015–2016: The Color Purple, Hairspray Live, and Sing ===
At the 87th Academy Awards, Hudson performed "I Can't Let Go" from Smash as a tribute to the individuals Hollywood lost in the previous year.

In February 2015, Hudson with Iggy Azalea released "Trouble". On Radio Disney, Iggy revealed that the collaboration happened after their previous work, she liked her voice and wanted Hudson to sing the hook for it. They performed the song together for the first time on February 4, 2015, on The Tonight Show Starring Jimmy Fallon, following performances on Clive Davis and The Recording Academy's annual pre-Grammy Gala, 2015 Kids' Choice Awards, 2015 iHeartRadio Music Awards and on the fourteenth season of American Idol. The accompanied music video was released on Iggy's YouTube channel on February 27, 2015, and as of 2024 it gained 112 million views, making it Jennifer's first 100 million and most viewed video on that platform. "Trouble" appeared on Iggy's Reclassified album.

Later in 2015, Hudson guest-starred as Michelle White, a minor semi-recurring character in the first season of Empire. She sang three songs on the show, "Remember the Music", "Whatever Makes You Happy", and "For My God".

Hudson helped welcome Pope Francis on his first visit to the United States by singing her rendition of Leonard Cohen's "Hallelujah".

In fall 2015, Hudson made her Broadway debut as Shug Avery in the Broadway revival of The Color Purple, alongside Cynthia Erivo and Danielle Brooks. New York Times critic Ben Brantley hailed her performance saying, "Ms. Hudson radiates a lush, supple stage presence that is echoed by her velvet voice." Hudson later picked up her second career Grammy for Best Musical Theater Album (2017) for her work on The Color Purple."

In June 2016, Hudson performed Prince's "Purple Rain", on the BET Awards, which she had previously sung onstage with the cast of The Color Purple, the day Prince died.

On June 28, 2016, Hudson signed with Epic Records. L.A. Reid and Clive Davis are joining forces for the first time since Whitney Houston's The Bodyguard soundtrack 25 years ago. "Jennifer Hudson is the defining voice of this generation", said Reid. "Her award-winning presence on records, in film and on stage establishes her as one of the premiere artists to emerge in this century." Davis says: "I signed Jennifer in 2007 believing her to be the strongest candidate as the next generation's Aretha Franklin and Whitney. She has become that, as LA and I excitingly reunite to capture Jennifer at her all-time best."

Meanwhile, Hudson picked up a few minor film roles, including in Spike Lee's musical Chi-Raq, and HBO's Confirmation, alongside Kerry Washington.

In December 2016, Hudson played scene-stealer Motormouth Maybelle in NBC's Hairspray Live!. Her version of the Civil Rights-themed ballad "I Know Where I've Been", blew audiences away, garnering Emmy buzz from fans and critics alike. During the credit sequence, Hudson duets with costar Ariana Grande on Shaiman and Wittman's "Come So Far".

Hudson lent her voice to the younger version of the character Nana Noodleman in the Illumination Entertainment film, Sing, which was released December 21, 2016. In the film, she sang The Beatles' classic, "Golden Slumbers/Carry That Weight", which was the recurring musical theme of the film. On the deluxe soundtrack, Hudson sings with Tori Kelly on a duet version of Leonard Cohen's "Hallelujah".

=== 2017–2020: Sandy Wexler, The Voice, Cats, and new music ===
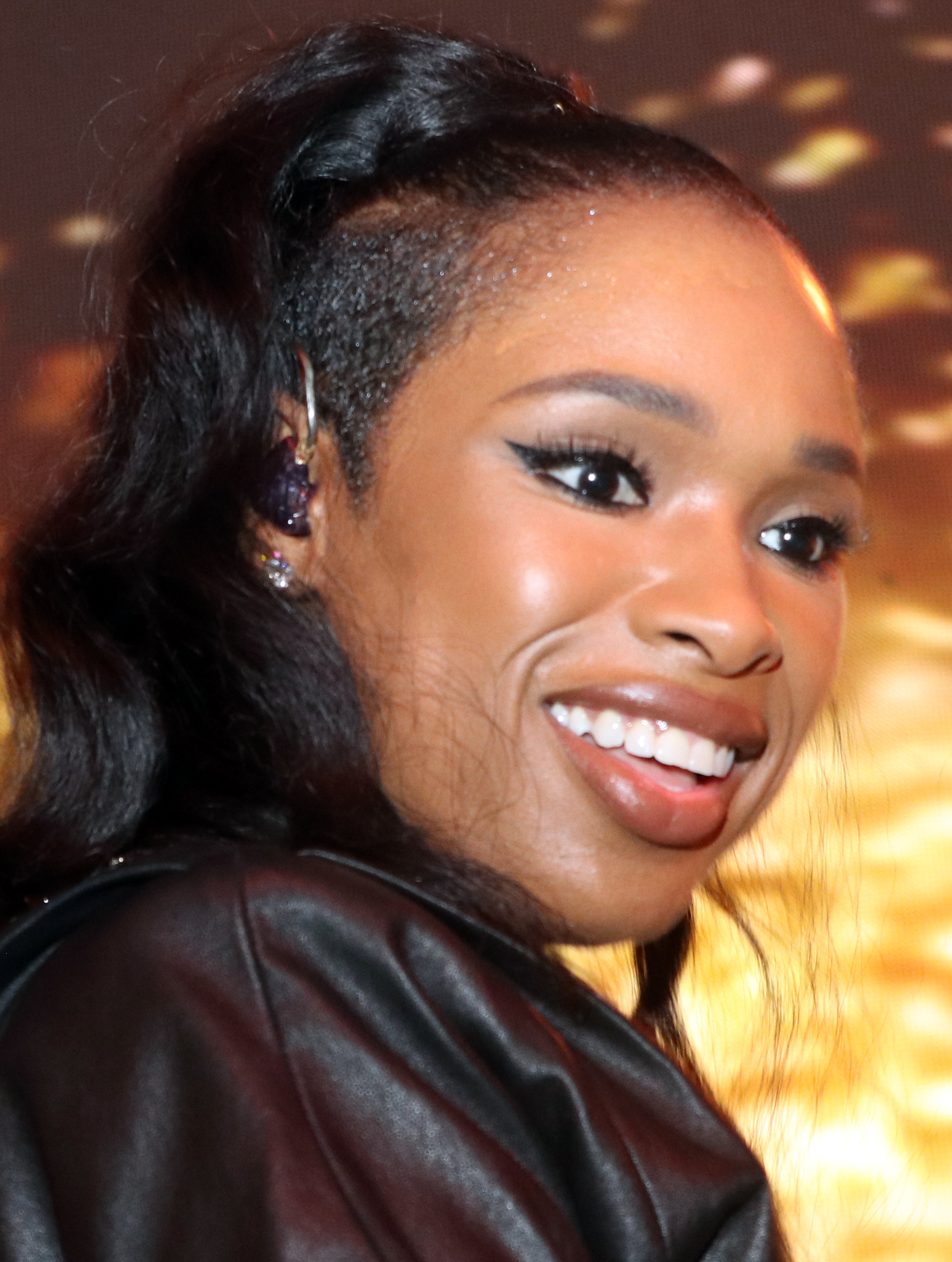
Hudson in 2018

Hudson starred as singer Courtney Clarke in the film, Sandy Wexler, which premiered in April 2017. In early 2017, Hudson debuted in The Voice franchise as a coach on the sixth season of The Voice UK. She won the season with her act Mo Adeniran and became the first female coach to win the show. Hudson had joined the American version of The Voice as a coach for its thirteenth season. Hudson released "Remember Me" on March 3, 2017. On December 12, 2017, she released another new song, "Burden Down". The same day, Hudson performed "Remember Me" live for the first time on the semi-final result night of The Voice. Later, a music video for the single was also released.

Hudson returned for her second series as a coach to The Voice UK; her second series premiered on January 6, 2018, and concluded on April 7, where Hudson's finalist Belle Voci finished third. On January 27, 2018, Clive Davis disclosed that Hudson had been handpicked by Aretha Franklin to portray her in an eventual biopic with a prospective release date in 2021. She performed with the D.C. Choir at the March for Our Lives anti-gun violence rally in Washington, D.C., on March 24, 2018. Hudson returned as a coach for the fifteenth season of the American version of The Voice after taking a one-season hiatus. Her final act, Kennedy Holmes, finished in fourth place overall. Hudson returned for The Voice UK's eighth series. In 2018, Hudson was cast as the Cats character Grizabella in the film adaptation, which was released in 2019. In March 2020, Hudson collaborated with Bono, Will.i.am, and Yoshiki to create "#SING4LIFE", a song written and compiled remotely by the four musicians to lift spirits during the COVID-19 crisis.

=== 2021–present: Respect, EGOT, talk show, The Gift of Love ===
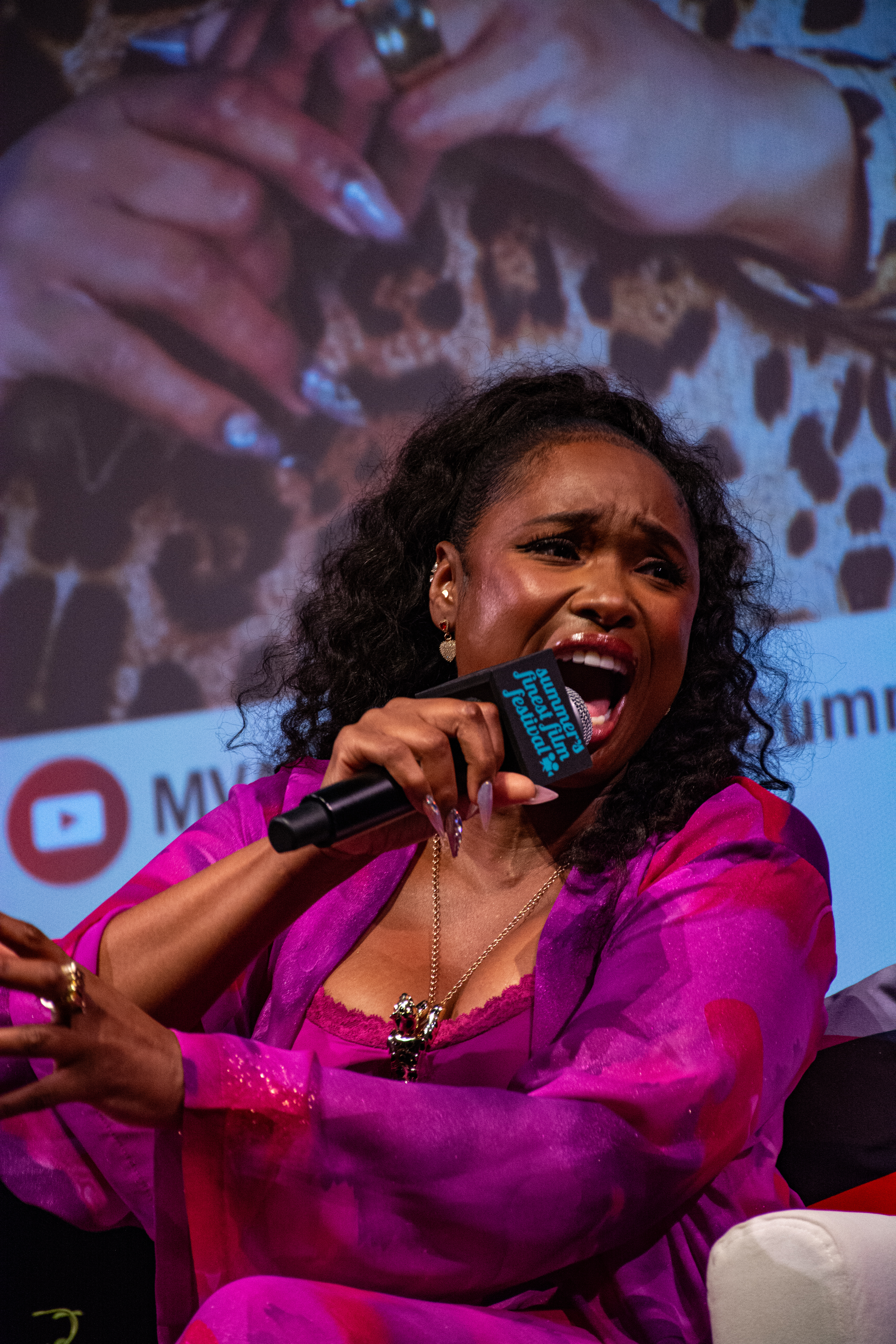
Hudson in 2025

On July 20, 2021, Hudson was interviewed by Oprah Winfrey about her role as Aretha Franklin in the film, Respect. The Aretha Franklin bio-pic, Respect, was directed by Liesl Tommy and was released in August 2021. Hudson's performance earned her the Chairman's Award at the Palm Springs International Film Festival as well as a nomination for the Screen Actors Guild Award for Outstanding Performance by a Female Actor in a Leading Role. The film was accompanied by a soundtrack sung entirely by Hudson featuring covers of several of Franklin's songs with one original song for Hudson, "Here I Am (Singing My Way Home)", being released as the soundtracks lead single in June 2021. The song earned Hudson nominations for the Golden Globe Award for Best Original Song and the Grammy Award for Best Song Written for Visual Media. The film's soundtrack received a nomination for the Grammy Award for Best Compilation Soundtrack for Visual Media.

On August 19, 2021, Hudson performed a show at the Apollo Theater called Jennifer Hudson - Live at the Apollo: A Night of Soul.

On August 21, Hudson performed "Nessun Dorma" at We Love NYC: The Homecoming Concert backed by New York Philharmonic in Central Park.

In September 2021, Hudson won a Daytime Emmy Award for Outstanding Interactive Media for a Daytime Program for being an executive producer for Baba Yaga, a 27-minute interactive fairytale story made for Oculus Quest.

In February 2022, Jennifer Hudson was one of the night's major winners at the 2022 NAACP Image Awards. She won the Entertainer of the Year and Outstanding Actress in a Motion Picture for her portrayal of Aretha Franklin in the film Respect. In May 2022, Hudson received a nomination for the Tony Award for Best Musical for serving as a producer for the Broadway musical, A Strange Loop. On June 12, 2022, Hudson became one of seventeen people to have won an Oscar, an Emmy, a Grammy, and a Tony ("an EGOT") at the 75th Tony Awards. She appeared in the 2022 film Tell It Like a Woman and starred in the 2024 science fiction thriller Breathe.

Hudson's syndicated talk show, The Jennifer Hudson Show, launched on September 12, 2022. On October 18, 2024, Hudson released her fourth studio album, The Gift of Love and toured the United States with The Gift of Love: An Intimate Live Experience. Hudson will serve as a producer for the 2026 Broadway revival of Dreamgirls.

== Personal life ==
=== Relationships ===
Hudson began dating James Payton in 1999, when she was 18. They separated in late 2007.

Hudson later met David Otunga, a professional wrestler in the WWE and a Harvard Law graduate, and the couple became engaged in September 2008. On August 10, 2009, she gave birth to their son, David Daniel Otunga Jr. by an emergency caesarean section. In November 2017, they separated after over 10 years together.

In 2022, while working together on their film Breathe, Hudson began dating rapper and fellow Chicago native Common. The pair confirmed their relationship with a joint appearance on The Jennifer Hudson Show in January 2024.

=== Family murder ===
On October 24, 2008, Hudson's 57-year-old mother Darnell Donerson and 29-year-old brother Jason Hudson were found shot to death inside the Chicago home Donerson shared with Hudson's older sister, Julia. An Amber alert was issued for her 7-year-old nephew, Julian King, when Julia reported him missing. Three days later the Federal Bureau of Investigation confirmed a body found on Chicago's West Side was the nephew; an autopsy indicated he had died from "multiple gunshot wounds". Police charged William Balfour, Julia's estranged 27-year-old husband, with three counts of first-degree murder and one count of home invasion. Convicted on all seven counts against him, in July 2012, he was sentenced to three life sentences without the possibility of parole (to be served consecutively), followed by an additional 120 years for his other convictions. Hudson's family created The Hudson-King Foundation for Families of Slain Victims, in honor of the three victims. Hudson and her sister created the Julian D. King Gift Foundation in honor of her nephew. It provides Christmas presents and school supplies to families in need in the Chicago area.

In late 2008, Donald Trump provided free housing and security for Hudson and her family following the murders. They stayed at the Trump International Hotel & Tower Chicago for several weeks at no charge.

=== Other personal matters ===
Hudson is a friend of former President Barack Obama, who invited her to appear with him at a fundraiser in Beverly Hills during his first term in May 2009. She also performed at the White House at the "Celebration of Music from the Civil Rights Movement" event.

In 2013 Hudson stated that she had never drunk alcohol

== Acting credits ==
=== Film ===
Year	Title	Role	Notes
2006	Dreamgirls	Effie White	
2007	Elmo's Christmas Countdown	Herself	TV movie
2008	Sex and the City	Louise	
2008	Winged Creatures	Kathy Archenault	
2008	The Secret Life of Bees	Rosaleen Daise	
2011	Winnie Mandela	Winnie Mandela	
2012	The Three Stooges	Sister Rosemary	
2013	The Inevitable Defeat of Mister & Pete	Gloria	
2013	Call Me Crazy: A Five Film	Maggie	TV movie
2013	Black Nativity	Naima Cobbs	
2014	Lullaby	Nurse Carrie	
2015	Chi-Raq	Irene	
2016	Confirmation	Angela Wright	TV movie
2016	Sing	Young Nana Noodleman (voice)	
2016	Hairspray Live!	Motormouth Maybelle	TV movie
2017	Sandy Wexler	Courtney Clarke	
2018	Monster	Mrs. Harmon	
2019	Cats	Grizabella	
2020	Baba Yaga	Forest (voice)	Short
2021	Respect	Aretha Franklin	
2022	Tell It Like a Woman	Kim Carter/Pepcy	
2024	Breathe	Maya	
2026	Goat	Louise Harris (voice)	
2026	Paw Patrol: The Dino Movie	Lilian Ledes (voice)	

=== Television ===
Year	Title	Role	Notes
2004	American Idol	Herself	Contestant: Season 3
2004	E! True Hollywood Story	Herself	Episode: "American Idol"
2010	Luxury Unveiled	Herself	Episode: "Tiffany & Co."
2011	The Hot 10	Herself	Episode: "Episode 1.5"
2011	Dancing with the Stars	Herself	Episode: "Episode 11.3"
2011	The X Factor	Herself/Judges' Expert	Episode: "Judges' Houses 1 & 2"
2011	The Xtra Factor	Herself	Episode: "Episode 8.10" & "8.11"
2012	Project Runway	Herself/Guest Judge	Episode: "Finale Part II"
2012	Smash	Veronica Moore	Recurring Cast: Season 2
2015	Empire	Michelle White	Recurring Cast: Season 1
2016	Inside Amy Schumer	Herself	Episode: "Brave"
2017	Ant and Dec's Saturday Night Takeaway	Herself	Episode: "Episode 14.1" & "14.2"
2017	Sunday Night at the Palladium	Herself	Episode: "Episode 4.2"
2017–19	The Voice UK	Herself/Coach	Main Coach: Seasons 6–8
2017–19	The Voice U.S.	Herself/Coach	Main Coach: Season 13 & 15
2018	Murder in the Family	Herself	Episode: "Jennifer Hudson"
2019	Saturday Mash-Up!	Herself	Episode: "Jack and Jack"
2019	Live in Front of a Studio Audience	Herself	Episode: "Norman Lear's All in the Family and The Jeffersons"
2021	The Black Church: This Is Our Story, This Is Our Song	Herself	Episode: "Episode 1.1"
2022–	The Jennifer Hudson Show	Herself/Host	Main Host
2023	Moon Girl and Devil Dinosaur	Mane (voice)	Episode: "Hair Today, Gone Tomorrow"

=== Theatre ===
Year	Title	Role	Venue	Ref.
2004	Hair	Performer	New Amsterdam Theatre, Broadway	
2006	The Best Little Whorehouse in Texas	Jewell	August Wilson Theatre, Broadway	
2015	The Color Purple	Shug Avery	Bernard B. Jacobs Theatre, Broadway	
2022	A Strange Loop	Co-Producer	Lyceum Theatre, Broadway	
2025	Smash	Co-Producer	Imperial Theatre, Broadway	

== Discography ==
- Jennifer Hudson (2008)
- I Remember Me (2011)
- JHUD (2014)
- The Gift of Love (2024)
