= Jennifer Hudson (album) =

Studio album by Jennifer Hudson
- Released: September 30, 2008
- Recorded: 2007–2008
- Genre: R&B
- Length: 52:23
- Labels: Arista; J
- Producers: Jim Beanz; Warryn Campbell; Rock City; Missy Elliott; Brian Kennedy; Ne-Yo; Polow da Don; Pro-Jay; Salaam Remi; Jack Splash; Stargate; T-Pain; Tank; Robin Thicke; Timbaland; The Underdogs

Jennifer Hudson chronology
Jennifer Hudson (2008)	I Remember Me (2011)

Singles from Jennifer Hudson
- 1. "Spotlight" Released: June 10, 2008; 2. "If This Isn't Love" Released: February 24, 2009; 3. "Giving Myself" Released: June 2, 2009

Jennifer Hudson is the debut studio album by American singer and actress Jennifer Hudson. It was first released in Australia, and it physically released in North America on September 30, 2008, by Arista and J Records. Hudson worked with several producers and songwriters on the album, including R. City, Missy Elliott, Brian Kennedy, Ne-Yo, Salaam Remi, T-Pain, Tank, Timbaland and The Underdogs, among others.

Three singles were released; it was led by "Spotlight", which peaked atop Billboard's Hot R&B/Hip-Hop Songs chart, peaked at number 24 on the Billboard Hot 100, and entered the top 20 of the UK Singles Chart. Jennifer Hudson debuted at number two on both the US Billboard 200 and Top R&B/Hip-Hop Albums charts, with first-week sales of 217,000 copies. It has since received gold certification by the Recording Industry Association of America (RIAA).

Hudson promoted the album in numerous live appearances; including co-heading a North American concert tour with Robin Thicke, from March to May 2009. Hudson won three NAACP Image Awards for Outstanding New Artist, Outstanding Album and Outstanding Duo or Group for the album, and was nominated for four Grammy Awards, winning for Best R&B Album. A deluxe edition was released to iTunes on February 24, 2009.

== Background ==
In January 2002, Hudson signed her first recording contract with Righteous Records, a Chicago-based independent record label. In 2004, she was released from her five-year contract so that she could audition for the third season of American Idol in Atlanta. As a finalist, Hudson received the highest number of votes in the Top 9 after her performance of Elton John's "Circle of Life" on April 6, 2004, but two weeks later she was eliminated after performing Barry Manilow's "Weekend in New England", coming in seventh place.

In November 2005, Hudson was cast in the role of Effie White for the film adaptation of the musical Dreamgirls. The filmmakers insisted on casting a relative unknown in the role, paralleling the casting of then-24-year-old Jennifer Holliday in that role for the original Broadway production. 783 singing actresses auditioned for the role of Effie White. Hudson was selected to play Effie, leading Fantasia Barrino to telephone her and jokingly complain that she "stole [Barrino's] part". Her performance earned several prizes, including an Academy Award for Best Supporting Actress, a Golden Globe Award, a BAFTA Award and a Screen Actors Guild Award. Hudson won particular praise for her show-stopping onscreen rendition of the hit song, "And I Am Telling You I'm Not Going", the signature song of the role. Her rendition entered the Billboard Hot 100 at number 98 in the January 13, 2007, issue and was Hudson's first top ten hit on the Billboard Hot Adult R&B Airplay chart on February 24, 2007.

In September 2006, Hudson performed the song "Over It" live on Fox Chicago Morning News. In the interview, she said that the song would be included on her first album, to be released in early 2007; this was before she had been signed to a record label. In late November 2006, it was announced that Hudson has signed a recording contract with J Records, a label of the Sony BMG music conglomerate. Hudson spoke to Access Hollywood at the 2006 A Fine Romance event in Hollywood, exclaiming,: "My album, I'll be recording my album! I just signed my record deal two weeks ago. So I'm starting on that in January."

== Release and promotion ==
=== Singles ===
The first single, "Spotlight", written and produced by Ne-Yo and Stargate, was played on US radio on June 9, 2008, and the following day was available as a music download. The song peaked at number twenty-four on the Billboard Hot 100 and at number one on the Billboard Hot R&B/Hip-Hop Songs, spending two consecutive weeks on top. In September 2008, "Spotlight" reached number eleven on the UK Singles Chart and peaked at number one on UK Airplay Chart.

The second single, "If This Isn't Love", was released on February 24, 2009. "My Heart" was originally scheduled as the second single and was due for an October 2008 release, but when her family murders occurred, Hudson rescheduled the release to January 2009. The single was then changed to "If This Isn't Love". On the charts, the track reached number five of the US Billboard Hot R&B/Hip-Hop Songs and the top forty of the UK Singles Chart. "If This Isn't Love" had a second consecutive week at number one on the Urban Adult Radio Charts, Hudson thus joining a group of only five other women in urban adult history to reach this accomplishment.

The third single, "Giving Myself", was sent to US radio on June 2, 2009. It charted on the US Billboard Hot R&B/Hip-Hop Songs at number 84.

=== Tour ===
Spring Tour with Robin Thicke
- Tour by Jennifer Hudson
- Associated album: Jennifer Hudson
- Start date: March 31, 2009
- End date: May 21, 2009
- No. of shows: 20 in North America

The Spring Tour with Robin Thicke, a tour to promote her album, began on March 31, 2009, in Albany, New York. Due to strain on her vocal cords, Hudson was instructed by her doctor to go on vocal rest, which led to several dates having to be rescheduled.

==== Tour dates ====
List of tour dates for Spring Tour with Robin Thicke
Date	City	Venue
March 31, 2009	Albany	Palace Theatre
April 2, 2009	Newark	New Jersey Performing Arts Center
April 3, 2009	Upper Darby Township	Tower Theater
April 4, 2009	Baltimore	Lyric Theatre
April 5, 2009	Washington, D.C.	DAR Constitution Hall
April 9, 2009	Mashantucket	MGM Grand at Foxwoods
April 10, 2009	New York City	WaMu Theatre
April 12, 2009	Norfolk	Chrysler Hall
April 15, 2009	Atlanta	Fox Theatre
April 17, 2009	Charlotte	Ovens Auditorium
April 18, 2009	Newark	New Jersey Performing Arts Center
April 18, 2009	Greensboro	Special Events Center
April 19, 2009	Richmond	Landmark Theater
April 23, 2009	St. Louis	Fox Theatre
April 24, 2009	Detroit	Detroit Opera House
April 25, 2009	Chicago	Arie Crown Theater
May 2, 2009	Los Angeles	Nokia Theatre
May 17, 2009	Houston	Verizon Wireless Theater
May 19, 2009	Oakland	Paramount Theatre
May 21, 2009	Grand Prairie	Nokia Theatre at Grand Prairie

== Critical reception ==
Professional ratings
Review scores
Source	Rating
About.com	4.5/5 stars
AllMusic	2.5/5 stars
Artistdirect	3.5/5 stars
Digital Spy	2/5 stars
Entertainment Weekly	B−
New York Daily News	3/5 stars
Slant Magazine	2.5/5 stars
The Times	3/5 stars

Jennifer Hudson received mixed reviews from music critics. At Metacritic, which assigns a weighted mean rating out of 100 to reviews from mainstream critics, the album received an average score of 58, based on seven reviews. Mark Edward Nero form About.com commended the album as "generally well-sung and well-produced" and considered it "without a doubt one of the strongest R&B albums of 2008." Sarah Rodman of The Boston Globe found that, "despite its flaws, Hudson's debut comes on much like her Dreamgirls character, with admirable self-assurance and real-girl sensuality." While she felt that the album was "a sometimes illogical jumble that hopscotches from gritty urban soul to glossy adult contemporary pop to the song that clinched her the little gold statue — "And I'm Telling You I'm Not Going." Hudson ties it all together with her titanic vocal prowess and emotional conviction. The Chicago native owns the strong material and elevates the weak [...] The most striking thing about the record, and what ultimately holds it together, is the placement of Hudson's voice front and center in the mix. Billboard named Jennifer Hudson 2008's "best R&B album" and said that Hudson's "self-titled debut showcases a voice so big, with an interpretive talent so natural, that it seems to burst beyond the confines of the recording. Hudson is so comfortable with singing — whatever the song might be — that she elevates the material, making it sound like nothing you've ever heard before. All hail the new diva".

Less enthusiastic, Chris Willman of Entertainment Weekly stated that, "The identity-defying something for everybody mentality yields a Robin Thicke ballad, a Timbaland stomper, some semi-acoustic soul from Stargate, and so on. None are exceptional, but they're all a sufficient delivery system for those spectacular vocal chops." He gave the album a B− rating. Similarly, Greg Kot from Chicago Tribune wrote, "There's no denying the Chicago native is a prodigiously gifted vocalist. But a singer is only as strong as her material, and there's not enough on Jennifer Hudson that measures up to her gutsy, gospel-drenched alto. Hudson's raw ability has been badly mismanaged." New York Daily News's Jim Farber wrote, that "clearly, Hudson needed the younger stuff to get on radio. Unfortunately, it violates her gift as a twentysomething woman whose voice sounds like it has been there and back. When she calls on that, Hudson comes closest to nailing the dream." Andy Kellman of AllMusic said, "Few vocalists as young as Hudson have a voice that is as versatile and expressive, proficient enough to pull off a multi-dimensional set of R&B songs, yet her debut is as tricked out as that of an artist with a small fraction of the talent. Neither the treatments nor the accessories were necessary."

=== Accolades ===
The album received four Grammy Award nominations at the 51st Grammy Awards in 2009 for Best R&B Album, Best R&B Performance by a Duo or Group with Vocals, Best Female R&B Vocal Performance and Best R&B Song for "Spotlight". At the ceremony on February 8, 2009, she performed "You Pulled Me Through" and she won the award for Best R&B Album.

== Commercial performance ==
The album debuted at number two on the Billboard 200 with sales of 217,000 copies sold in the United States. In its second week, the album fell to number 4, with sales of 63,000 copies. On November 7, 2008, the album was certified Gold by RIAA and by 2011 had sold 826,000 copies.

The album peaked at number twenty-one on the UK Albums Chart, and has sold 172,720 copies as of April 2011.

== Track listing ==
Jennifer Hudson track listing
No.	Title	Writer(s)	Producer(s)	Length
1.	"Spotlight"	Mikkel Storleer Eriksen; Tor Erik Hermansen; Shaffer Smith	Stargate; Ne-Yo	4:10
2.	"If This Isn't Love"	Brian Kennedy; Theron Thomas; Timothy Thomas	Kennedy; Harvey Mason Jr.^{[A]}	3:36
3.	"Pocketbook" (featuring Ludacris)	Christopher Bridges; Hannon Lane; Timothy Mosley; Candice Nelson; James Washington	Timbaland; Jim Beanz	3:18
4.	"Giving Myself"	Robin Thicke	Thicke; Pro-Jay	4:15
5.	"What's Wrong (Go Away)" (featuring T-Pain)	Faheem Najm	T-Pain	3:47
6.	"My Heart"	Johntá Austin; Jamal Jones; Kennedy; Jason Perry	Polow da Don; Mason Jr.^{[A]}	3:33
7.	"You Pulled Me Through"	Diane Warren	Mason; Kennedy	3:40
8.	"I'm His Only Woman" (featuring Fantasia)	Melissa Elliott; Jack Splash; Jazmine Sullivan	Splash; Missy Elliott^{[B]}	4:18
9.	"Can't Stop the Rain"	Amund Bjørklund; Hermansen; Espen Lind; Eriksen; Smith	Stargate; Ne-Yo^{[B]}	4:44
10.	"We Gon' Fight"	Durrell Babbs; Antonio Dixon	Tank	4:02
11.	"Invisible"	Tiffany Fred; Steven Russell; Mason; Damon Thomas	The Underdogs; Mason Jr.^{[A]}	3:43
12.	"And I Am Telling You I'm Not Going"	Tom Eyen; Henry Krieger	The Underdogs; Mason Jr.^{[A]}	4:43
13.	"Jesus Promised Me a Home Over There"	Traditional	Warryn Campbell	4:24

US Target edition bonus track
No.	Title	Writer(s)	Producer(s)	Length
14.	"Stand Up"	Hudson; Powell; English; Grainer; Little; Hayes	Powell	4:04
15.	"Spotlight" (Moto Blanco Radio Mix)	Eriksen; Hermansen; Smith	Stargate; Ne-Yo; Moto Blanco^{[C]}	4:11
16.	"Spotlight" (D. Hotwell & Fidelity Mix)	Eriksen; Hermansen; Smith	Stargate; Ne-Yo; D. Hotwell^{[C]}	3:46

US re-issue and international edition bonus track
No.	Title	Writer(s)	Producer(s)	Length
14.	"All Dressed in Love"	Thomas Callaway; Matt Kahane; Salaam Remi	Splash; Remi	3:22

Japanese and UK edition bonus track
No.	Title	Writer(s)	Producer(s)	Length
15.	"Stand Up"	Hudson; Earl Powell; Walter English; Bill Grainer; Herman Little III; Patrick Hayes	Powell	4:04

iTunes Store edition bonus track
No.	Title	Writer(s)	Producer(s)	Length
15.	"Spotlight (Part II)" (featuring Young Jeezy)	Eriksen; Hermansen; Smith; Jay Jenkins	Stargate; Ne-Yo	5:07

iTunes Store deluxe edition bonus tracks
No.	Title	Writer(s)	Producer(s)	Length
16.	"Spotlight" (Music video)			3:39
17.	"The Star-Spangled Banner" (performed at the Super Bowl XLIII)			2:23
18.	"You Pulled Me Through" (performed at the 51st Grammy Awards)			3:34
19.	"If This Isn't Love" (Stonebridge Remix)	Kennedy; Thomas; Thomas	Kennedy; Mason^{[A]}; Stonebridge^{[C]}	3:14
20.	"Spotlight" (Moto Blanco Radio Remix)	Eriksen; Hermansen; Smith	Stargate; Ne-Yo; Moto Blanco^{[C]}	4:11

Notes

- ^{^[A]} denotes vocals producer
- ^{^[B]} denotes co-producer
- ^{^[C]} denotes additional producer

== Charts ==
=== Weekly charts ===
Weekly chart performance for Jennifer Hudson
Chart (2008)	Peak position
Australian Albums (ARIA)	73
Canadian Albums (Nielsen SoundScan)	51
Irish Albums (IRMA)	46
Italian Albums (FIMI)	75
Japanese Albums (Oricon)	27
Scottish Albums (Official Charts)	55
Taiwanese Albums (Five Music)	14
UK Albums (Official Charts)	21
UK R&B Albums (Official Charts)	4
US Billboard 200	2
US Top R&B/Hip-Hop Albums (Billboard)	2

=== Year-end charts ===
2008 year-end chart performance for Jennifer Hudson
Chart (2008)	Position
US Billboard 200	93
US Top R&B/Hip-Hop Albums (Billboard)	19

2009 year-end chart performance for Jennifer Hudson
Chart (2009)	Position
US Billboard 200	103
US Top R&B/Hip-Hop Albums (Billboard)	27

== Certifications ==
Certifications for Jennifer Hudson
Region	Certification	Certified units/sales
United Kingdom (BPI)	Gold	100,000^{*}
United States (RIAA)	Gold	500,000^{^}
^{*} Sales figures based on certification alone.^{^} Shipments figures based on certification alone.

== Release history ==
Release dates and formats for Jennifer Hudson
Region	Date	Format	Editions
Australia	September 27, 2008	Digital download; CD	Original
United Kingdom	September 29, 2008	Digital download; CD	Original
United States	September 30, 2008	Digital download; CD	Original
Canada	October 7, 2008	Digital download; CD	Original
Europe	December 12, 2008	Digital download; CD	Original
United States	February 24, 2009	Digital download; CD	Re-release
Brazil	March 11, 2009	Digital download; CD	Original
