= Spotlight (Jennifer Hudson song) =

2008 single by Jennifer Hudson

Single by Jennifer Hudson

from the album Jennifer Hudson
- Released: June 10, 2008
- Studio: Roc the Mic Studios (New York, NY); Westlake Recording Studios (Los Angeles, CA)
- Length: 4:10 (album version); 3:44 (radio edit)
- Label: Arista; J
- Songwriters: Mikkel S. Eriksen; Tor Erik Hermansen; Shaffer Smith
- Producers: Ne-Yo; Stargate

Jennifer Hudson singles chronology
"And I Am Telling You I'm Not Going" (2006)	"Spotlight" (2008)	"If This Isn't Love" (2009)

"Spotlight" is the debut single by American entertainer Jennifer Hudson. It was written and produced by Ne-Yo and Norwegian production duo Stargate for Hudson's self-titled debut album (2008). The mid-tempo song was released digitally by Arista Records and J Records as the album's lead single on June 10, 2008.

The song reached the top 30 of the US Billboard Hot 100. Outside the US, it became a top 20 hit in Hungary, Japan, and the United Kingdom. "Spotlight" received two Grammy Award nominations at the 2009 ceremony for Best R&B Song and Best Female R&B Vocal Performance. The video was voted 12th on BET: Notarized Top 100 videos of 2008.

== Background ==
"Spotlight" was written and produced by Ne-Yo along with Mikkel S. Eriksen and Tor Erik Hermansen from Norwegian production duo Stargate. In the lead-up to the release of the song, Ne-Yo explained in an interview with Billboard magazine: "They were really trying to figure out where to take her. The main issue with Jennifer Hudson is her voice is so huge, so how do you take that and radio-ize it, make it radio-friendly. She can't do every song 'cause you'll eventually be tired of it. So ("Spotlight") is kind of a classy midtempo, and I hope and pray it does well 'cause Jennifer is an amazing talent."

== Critical reception ==
The song received generally positive reviews. About.com said that "If you were one of the people wondering if Jennifer Hudson could sustain her vocal energy, power and passion on a full album like she did in the role of Effie in the movie Dreamgirls and like she also does on the album's opening song and first single, "Spotlight," then wonder no more: the answer's a definite yes. "Spotlight" exemplifies the album as a whole: it's got a strong, independent woman singing strongly about love and relationships. In this case, the song is about a controlling lover: "If I'm just love's prisoner, then I'm bustin' out," she sings." AllHipHop said that ""Spotlight" as catchy as it is was not debut single-worthy, and a brand new artist wouldn't have been looked at twice; but because it was Jennifer (and penned by Ne-Yo) attention was paid."

AllMusic said that "Spotlight" was "both promising and satisfying, nearly a dead-center bull's-eye – dramatic but not over the top, powerful but not a gratuitous fireworks display, a melancholy but striking midtempo track with a gently thumping four-four pulse." Digital Spy said that Hudson "navigates the emotional complexities of 'Spotlight', on which she plays a downtrodden girlfriend". New York Daily News said that the song's "trendy, staccato backup vocals give the song spine. Better, the character presented by the lyrics – a put-upon woman who's finally stepping out – fits Hudson's persona as the angry queen of payback." Slant magazine said that "Lead single "Spotlight" is a serviceable, pulsating, you-did-me-wrong jam that is, thanks to Stargate and Ne-Yo, perfectly in line with today's trends." The Times said the song "is predictably mid-tempo as it tries to please all her fan bases at once."

== Chart performance ==
"Spotlight" peaked at number twenty-four on the US Billboard Hot 100, giving Hudson her first top thirty entry. The song also peaked at number one on the US Hot R&B/Hip-Hop Songs chart, spending two consecutive weeks at number one. On September 21, 2008, the song entered the UK Singles Chart at number fifteen on downloads alone. It climbed to number eleven on September 28 despite there being no CD single release. It also peaked at number one on UK Airplay Chart. In 2008, "Spotlight" was the biggest selling non-top ten single of the year. In 2017, following an impromptu performance on The Voice UK the song re-entered the United Kingdom charts at number 90.

== Music video ==
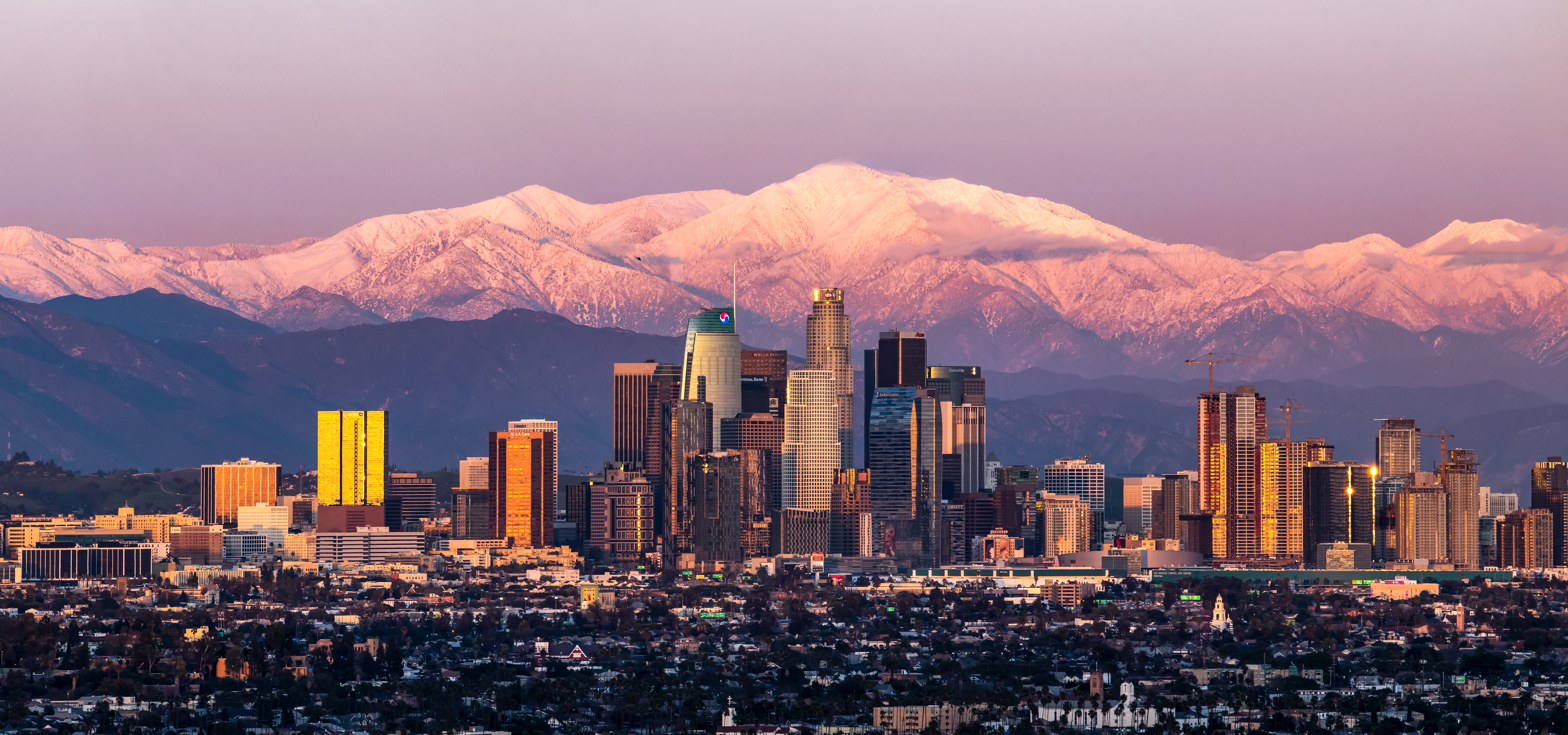
The music video for "Spotlight" was filmed in Los Angeles in June 2008.

The song's music video was directed by Chris Robinson and produced by Robot Films. Hudson spent a 22-hour day filming the visuals with Robinson in Los Angeles in June 2008. The final scene in the "Spotlight" video was shot at 4 a.m. and depicts Hudson, backlit, walking through an alley toward the camera as she sings about an overbearing lover. Ryan Gentles from the plays Madea Goes to Jail and Diary of a Mad Black Woman appears in the video as Hudson's love interest. Hudson introduced its premiere screening on BET's 106 and Park on June 24, 2008.

Hudson appears talking on her cellphone to her friend, complaining about her over-protective boyfriend. After she gets off her cellphone, she puts on a jacket and a scarf and leaves her house into an alley, then enters a nightclub, dancing and having a good time until she sees her boyfriend Gentles. She then takes his hand and leads him into a white room with stripes telling him that she loves him but that he needs to realize that she is a good girlfriend and not to worry before it is too late. Towards the end of the video, Hudson is walking down a runway with her boyfriend sitting in front of the runway. The video ends with Hudson getting off her cellphone. A bottle of Campari is prominently displayed in the video in a scene featuring Hudson and Gentles at the nightclub.

== Track listings ==
US CD single

1. "Spotlight" (album version) – 4:10
2. "Spotlight" (instrumental) – 4:11
3. "Spotlight" (call out hook) – 0:11
4. "Spotlight" (Remix By Jemell Moore [Google My Name]) – 4:09

German basic CD

1. "Spotlight" (album version) – 4:10
2. "Spotlight" (part 2; featuring Young Jeezy) – 5:07

German premium CD

1. "Spotlight" (main version) – 4:10
2. "Spotlight" (Moto Blanco club mix) – 7:56
3. "Spotlight" (Quentin Harris Dark Collage club mix) – 11:31
4. "Spotlight" (Johnny Vicious Muzik mix) – 9:30
5. "Spotlight" (music video) – 3:39

UK digital single

1. "Spotlight" (U.K. radio edit) – 3:44

UK download bundle

1. "Spotlight" – 4:10
2. "Spotlight" (Moto Blanco club mix) – 7:56
3. "Spotlight" (Quentin Harris Dark College club mix) – 8:49
4. "Spotlight" (Johnny Vicious Muzik mix) – 6:45
5. "Spotlight" (Moto Blanco dub) – 6:58
6. "Spotlight" (Johnny vicious Warehouse dub) – 7:11
7. "Spotlight" (Moto Blanco radio mix) – 4:11
8. "Spotlight" (Johnny Vicious radio mix) – 3:52

== Charts ==
=== Weekly charts ===
Weekly chart performance for "Spotlight"
Chart (2008–2009)	Peak position
Australia (ARIA)	96
Austria (Ö3 Austria Top 40)	73
Belgium (Ultratip Bubbling Under Flanders)	20
Canada Hot 100 (Billboard)	69
European Hot 100 Singles (Billboard)	36
Germany (GfK)	58
Global Dance Songs (Billboard)	17
Hungary (Rádiós Top 40)	19
Ireland (IRMA)	32
Japan (Japan Hot 100)	15
New Zealand (Recorded Music NZ)	21
Slovakia Airplay (ČNS IFPI)	79
UK Singles (Official Charts)	11
UK Hip Hop/R&B (Official Charts)	14
US Billboard Hot 100	24
US Hot R&B/Hip-Hop Songs (Billboard)	1
US Dance Club Songs (Billboard)	8
US Rhythmic Airplay (Billboard)	27

=== Year-end charts ===
2008 year-end chart performance for "Spotlight"
Chart (2008)	Position
Japan (Japan Hot 100)	96
UK Singles (OCC)	65
US Hot R&B/Hip-Hop Songs (Billboard)	9

2009 year-end chart performance for "Spotlight"
Chart (2009)	Position
Hungary (Rádiós Top 40)	55
US Hot R&B/Hip-Hop Songs (Billboard)	29

== Certifications ==
Certifications for "Spotlight"
Region	Certification	Certified units/sales
New Zealand (RMNZ)	Platinum	30,000^{‡}
United Kingdom (BPI)	Platinum	600,000^{‡}
^{‡} Sales+streaming figures based on certification alone.

== Release history ==
List of releases of "Spotlight"
Region	Date	Format(s)	Label	Ref
United States	June 9, 2008	Airplay	Arista Records	
United States	June 10, 2008	Digital download	Arista Records	
United Kingdom	October 20, 2008	CD single	Arista Records	

== See also ==
- List of number-one R&B singles of 2008 (U.S.)
