= Winnie Mandela (film) =

2011 film by Darrell Roodt

- Film poster
- Directed by: Darrell Roodt
- Screenplay by: Darrell Roodt; André Pieterse; Paul Ian Johnson
- Based on: Winnie Mandela: A Life by Anne Marie du Preez Bezrob
- Produced by: Michael Mosca
- Starring: Jennifer Hudson; Terrence Howard; Wendy Crewson; Elias Koteas; Justin Strydom
- Cinematography: Mario Janelle
- Edited by: Sylvain Lebel
- Music by: Laurent Eyquem
- Production companies: Ironwood Films; Equinoxe Films; The Movie Channel
- Distributed by: Image Entertainment
- Release dates: September 16, 2011 (TIFF); October 12, 2011 (Canada); March 14, 2014 (South Africa)
- Countries: South Africa; Canada
- Languages: English; Xhosa
- Budget: $15 million
- Box office: $80,634

Winnie Mandela is a 2011 South African-Canadian historical drama film starring Jennifer Hudson and Terrence Howard as Winnie and Nelson Mandela. Based on Anne Marie du Preez Bezrob's biography Winnie Mandela: A Life, the film is directed by Darrell Roodt and co-stars Wendy Crewson, Elias Koteas and Justin Strydom. Image Entertainment released the film in theaters on September 6, 2013. It received generally negative reviews.

== Plot ==
The film portrays the life of Winnie Madikizela-Mandela (Jennifer Hudson), from her strict rural upbringing by a father disappointed she was not born a boy, to her giving up the chance to study in America in order to remain in South Africa where she felt more needed, through her husband Nelson Mandela's (Terrence Howard) imprisonment to South Africa's eventual freedom from apartheid. She endured continuous harassment by the security police, banishment to a small Orange Free State town, betrayal by friends and allies, and imprisonment, including more than a year in solitary confinement. Upon her release, she continues activism against apartheid, while under the protection of thuggish members of her own football club, and, after his release from prison, suffers divorce. Due to her football club, she faces accusations of violence and murder and in the end of the film appears before the apartheid truth and reconciliation committee to own up to her actions in court. In the audience many including members of the South African Women's League that she led show their support for her because of her fight against apartheid and women's rights.

== Cast ==
- Jennifer Hudson as Winnie Mandela
- Terrence Howard as Nelson Mandela
- Wendy Crewson as Mary Botha
- Elias Koteas as Major de Vries
- Justin Strydom as Chief Policeman
- Aubrey Poo as Peter Magubane
- Jonathan Rands as Judge de Wet
- Hlomla Dandala as Oliver Tambo
- Leleti Khumalo as Adelaide Tambo
- Clive Scott as Judge FL Rumpff
- John Whiteley as Cecil Williams
- Nhlanhilo Milo as Zenani Mandela
- Zinhle Mabena as Zindzi Mandela
- Damon Berry as Rev Verryn
- Fezile Mpela as Cyril Ramaphosa
- Deon Lotz as F.W. de Klerk
- Zibuse Zihle as Walter Sisulu
- Albert Maritz as Chris Hattingh

== Production ==
Writers Andre Pieterse and Darrell Roodt, who also directed, developed the screenplay based on Anne Marie du Preez Bezrob's biography Winnie Mandela: A Life. The film was produced by Equinoxe Films. Filming took place in Johannesburg, Cape Town, and Robben Island in South Africa beginning in April 2010.

== Release and reception ==
The film premiered at the Toronto International Film Festival in September 2011.

By April 2012, T.D. Jakes and his company TDJ Enterprises/Film Bridge International had taken over the production, distribution and marketing of the film. It was released to a limited number of theatres in Canada on October 5, 2012. On May 16, 2013, Image Entertainment acquired the rights to release the film in North America.

The film holds a 15% rating on Rotten Tomatoes based on reviews from 34 critics. The site's consensus states, "Winnie Mandela takes few chances and delves only superficially into its subject's life, making it feel more like a too-earnest made-for-TV movie than a proper biopic." Rick Groen of The Globe and Mail says, "Winnie begins as hagiography and ends in hellish confusion," and Linda Barnard of the Toronto Star said, "It won't satisfy history students curious about this polarizing figure, nor fans of its star, Oscar winner Jennifer Hudson." David Rooney of The Hollywood Reporter stated, "Solid performances are undercut by lack of storytelling integrity in this plodding biopic," and Ed Gibbs of The Guardian said, "This syrupy biography of the former wife of Nelson Mandela seeks to sugar-coat South Africa's complex history."

Winnie Mandela criticized the fact that she was not consulted for the making of a film about her life, stating, "I have absolutely nothing against Jennifer [Hudson, the film's star], but I have everything against the movie itself. I was not consulted. I am still alive, and I think that it is a total disrespect to come to South Africa, make a movie about my struggle, and call that movie some translation of a romantic life of Winnie Mandela."

Some South African actors also criticized the selection of American actors for South African roles; Oupa Lebogo, general secretary of the Creative Worker's Union (CWU) said of Hudson's casting, "This decision must be reversed, it must be stopped now. If the matter doesn't come up for discussion, we will push for a moratorium to be placed on the film being cast in South Africa. We are being undermined, there is no respect at all."

A preview of the film released in November 2010 was referred to by the filmmakers as originating from computer hackers, saying it was an "unauthorised download originated from a secure website belonging to our sales representative, Filmbridge ... The material was not formally edited, graded or sound-mixed. At this stage, the producers have elected to make no further comment and are investigating the matter."
