= If This Isn't Love (Jennifer Hudson song) =

Song by Jennifer Hudson

Single by Jennifer Hudson

from the album Jennifer Hudson
- Released: February 24, 2009
- Genre: Adult contemporary
- Length: 3:35
- Label: Arista; J
- Songwriters: Theron Thomas; Timothy Thomas; Brian Kennedy
- Producers: Brian Kennedy; Harvey Mason, Jr.

Jennifer Hudson singles chronology
"Spotlight" (2008)	"If This Isn't Love" (2009)	"Giving Myself" (2009)

"If This Isn't Love" is a song recorded by American recording artist Jennifer Hudson. It was written and composed by Planet VI, brothers Theron and Timothy Thomas, along with Brian Kennedy for her eponymous debut album, released in 2008. Production on the song was handled by the latter and Harvey Mason, Jr. Musically, it is a midtempo Adult contemporary ballad, built along on a piano and electric guitar sounds.

The song was released as the second single from the album following "Spotlight" in 2009. Upon release, "If This Isn't Love" was met with generally positive reviews from contemporary critics who praised the song's structure and its modern interpretation for an adult audience. On the charts, the track failed to make much impact, though it reached number five of the US Billboard Hot R&B/Hip-Hop Songs and the top forty of the UK Singles Chart. Hudson promoted the song on The Ellen DeGeneres Show on March 26, 2009 and on American Idol on Wednesday’s results show on April 15, 2009.

== Critical reception ==
Andy Kellman from Allmusic stated that "Hudson's voice is smoothed out through the fluttery "If This Isn't Love" (not to mention spiked with grating male grunts of "Hey!"), nearly unrecognizable until the point where she belts." Slant Magazine said that " 'If This Isn't Love' succeeds at sounding completely modern without eschewing the standard adult-contemporary song structure that's tailor-made for pipes like Hudson's."

David Balls from Digital Spy felt that "If This Isn't Love" was a "delicate love song that finds Hudson in her natural comfort zone. 'God sent me an angel from above, that's going to love me for life,' she sings soulfully, with recent events making the lyrics particularly resonant. Combining modish beats with a cool, breezy chorus, 'If This Isn't Love' may not be in the same league as recent power ballads from Beyoncé and Leona, but it has an understated charm that's hard to quibble with." Commenting on its remix, produced by Fraser T. Smith, he added: "The single comes with no fewer than six different remixes, but the straightforwardly-titled Fraser T Smith Remix wins 'B-side Of The Week' as it adds a bit of extra zest to the song without removing any of its understated charm. Smith has carefully tinkered with the track's foundations, injecting some R&B adrenaline and a bit more of a beat. Thankfully, he's also chopped out the male screeching from the start of the original, which seemed bizarrely inappropriate in the first place."

== Chart performance ==
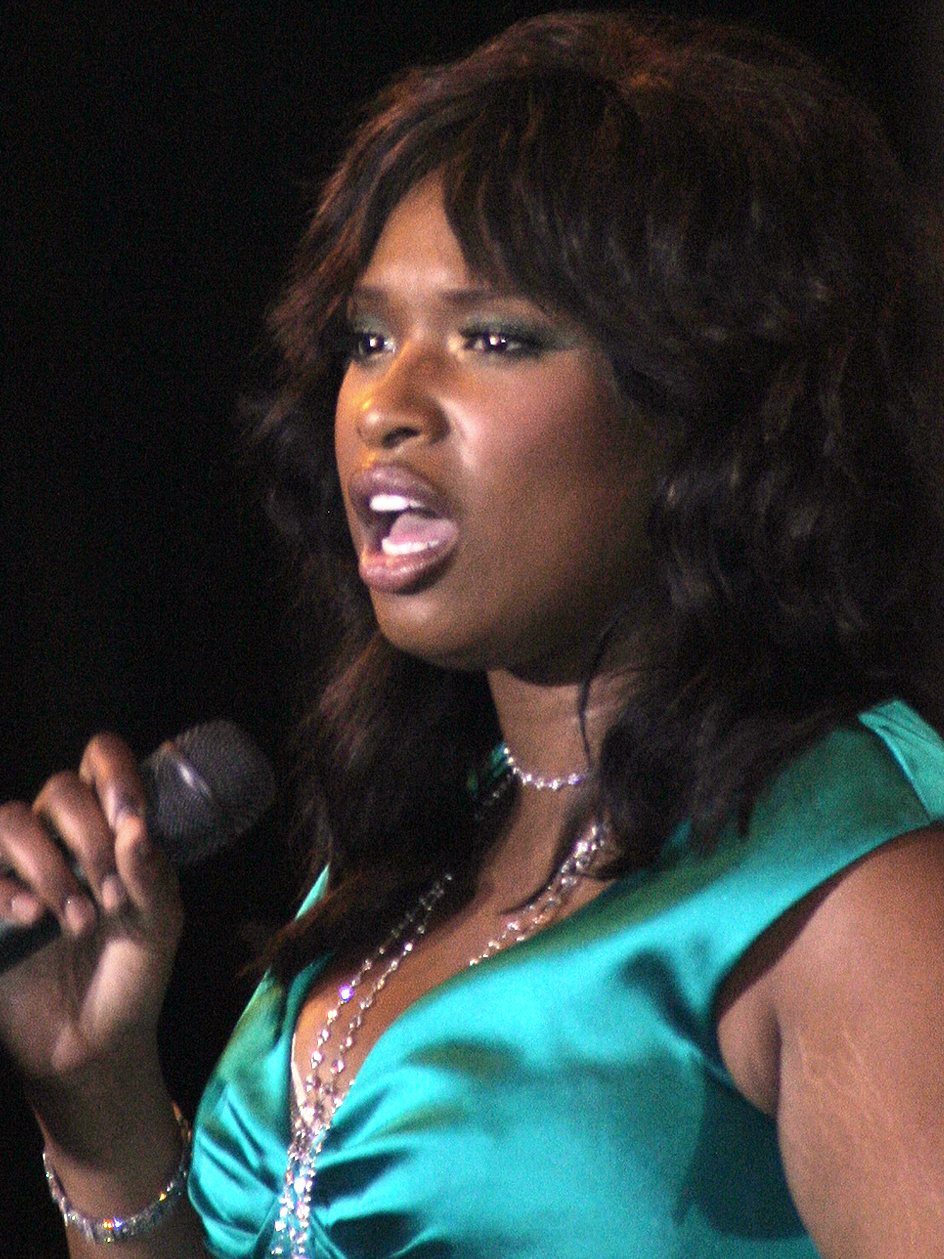
"If This Isn't Love" became Hudson's second consecutive number-one hit on the Urban Adult Radio Charts.

"If This Isn't Love" entered the UK Singles Chart at number 195 on February 22, 2009 and reached a peak of number 37 on downloads alone. It marked Hudson's second consecutive top 40 hit on the chart. Due to a high peak of number three on the UK Airplay Chart, the song also charted at number twenty on Hit40UK. The song spent eleven weeks on the UK Singles Chart.

In the United States, the song debuted and peaked at number 84 on the Billboard's Hot 100. Several weeks later, it reached a new peak at number 63, boosted by Hudson's performance on the April 15, 2009 results show of American Idol. On the Billboard Hot R&B/Hip-Hop Songs, the song became Hudson's second consecutive top five hit, peaking at number five. Hudson made history with "If This Isn't Love" when it earned its second consecutive week at number one on the Urban Adult Radio Charts. Thus, Hudson joined a group of only five other women in urban adult history to reach this accomplishment.

== Music video ==
Hudson shot a music video for the track in Los Angeles, California on January 26, 2009 with director Diane Martel. The video premiered February 11, 2009 on AOL, Entertainment Tonight, and 106 & Park.

== Formats and track listings ==
Digital EP

1. "If This Isn't Love" – 3:36
2. "If This Isn't Love" (StoneBridge remix) – 3:12
3. "If This Isn't Love" (Fraser T Smith remix) – 3:36
4. "If This Isn't Love" (music video) – 3:36

UK Digital single

1. "If This Isn't Love" – 3:36
2. "If This Isn't Love" (Fraser T Smith remix) – 3:36

== Credits and personnel ==
Credits adapted from the liner notes of Jennifer Hudson.

- Songwriting – Theron Thomas, Timothy Thomas, Brian Kennedy
- Production – Brian Kennedy, Harvey Mason, Jr.
- Recording – Andrew Hey, Dabling Harward
- Mixing – Harvey Mason Jr.
- Mastering – Chris Gehringer

== Charts ==
=== Weekly charts ===
Weekly chart performance for "If This Isn't Love"
Chart (2009)	Peak position
Germany (Deutsche Urban Charts)	13
Germany (GfK)	76
South Korea International Streaming (Gaon)	97
UK Singles (Official Charts)	37
US Billboard Hot 100	63
US Hot R&B/Hip-Hop Songs (Billboard)	5

=== Year-end charts ===
Year-end chart performance for "If This Isn't Love"
Chart (2009)	Position
US Hot R&B/Hip-Hop Songs (Billboard)	16

== Release history ==
List of releases of "If This Isn't Love"
Region	Date	Label	Ref
United States	February 24, 2009	Arista Records	
United Kingdom	March 23, 2009	Arista Records	
