= Murder of the Hudson family =

2008 crime in Illinois, United States

Murder of Darnell Donerson, Jason Hudson, and Julian King
- Location: Chicago, Illinois
- Date: October 24, 2008; 18 years ago 8:00–9:00 (US Central time (UTC−06:00))
- Target: Julia Hudson
- Weapon: SIG Sauer handgun
- Victims: Jason Hudson; Darnell Donerson; Julian King
- Perpetrator: William Balfour

The murder of 29-year-old Jason Hudson, his nephew, Julian King, and his mother Darnell Donerson occurred on October 24, 2008. Two of them were discovered shot to death inside Donerson's home in Chicago, Illinois. The victims were the brother and mother of singer Jennifer Hudson. Jennifer's seven-year-old nephew Julian King, the son of her elder sister Julia Hudson, was initially reported missing and an Amber alert was issued; Julian King's body was found on October 27 in Chicago's West Side area, in a parked car matching the Amber alert description. Autopsy results indicated that Julian King's death was due to "multiple gunshot wounds." A pistol found in a West Side vacant lot was confirmed as the murder weapon by Chicago police.

== Investigation ==
On the day that the bodies of Hudson's mother and brother were discovered, Chicago police took Julia Hudson's estranged husband William Balfour, 27, into custody and he confessed. Balfour was on parole and spent nearly seven years in prison for attempted murder, vehicular hijacking and possession of a stolen vehicle. The Illinois Department of Corrections' records reveal one of Balfour's addresses to be the home where Donerson and Jason Hudson were murdered.

=== Arrest and conviction ===
On December 1, 2008, Balfour was arrested and charged with three counts of first-degree murder for the deaths of Donerson, Jason Hudson and King, as well as one count of felony home invasion. At a December 3 court hearing in which Balfour was denied bail, a prosecutor alleged that Balfour had committed the murders out of anger that his estranged wife was dating another man. Balfour's attorney Joshua Kutnick said that his client maintained his innocence in the crimes. Balfour was indicted on December 30. On January 20, 2009, he pleaded not guilty to all charges. He was convicted in May 11, 2012 and sentenced to 3 life sentences plus 120 years.

== Legacy ==
In the aftermath of the deaths, Hudson's family announced the creation of the Hudson-King Foundation for Families of Slain Victims, a foundation "to care for the needs of families who have lost relatives to a violent crime," according to a statement released to the press.
