= Killer Mike discography =

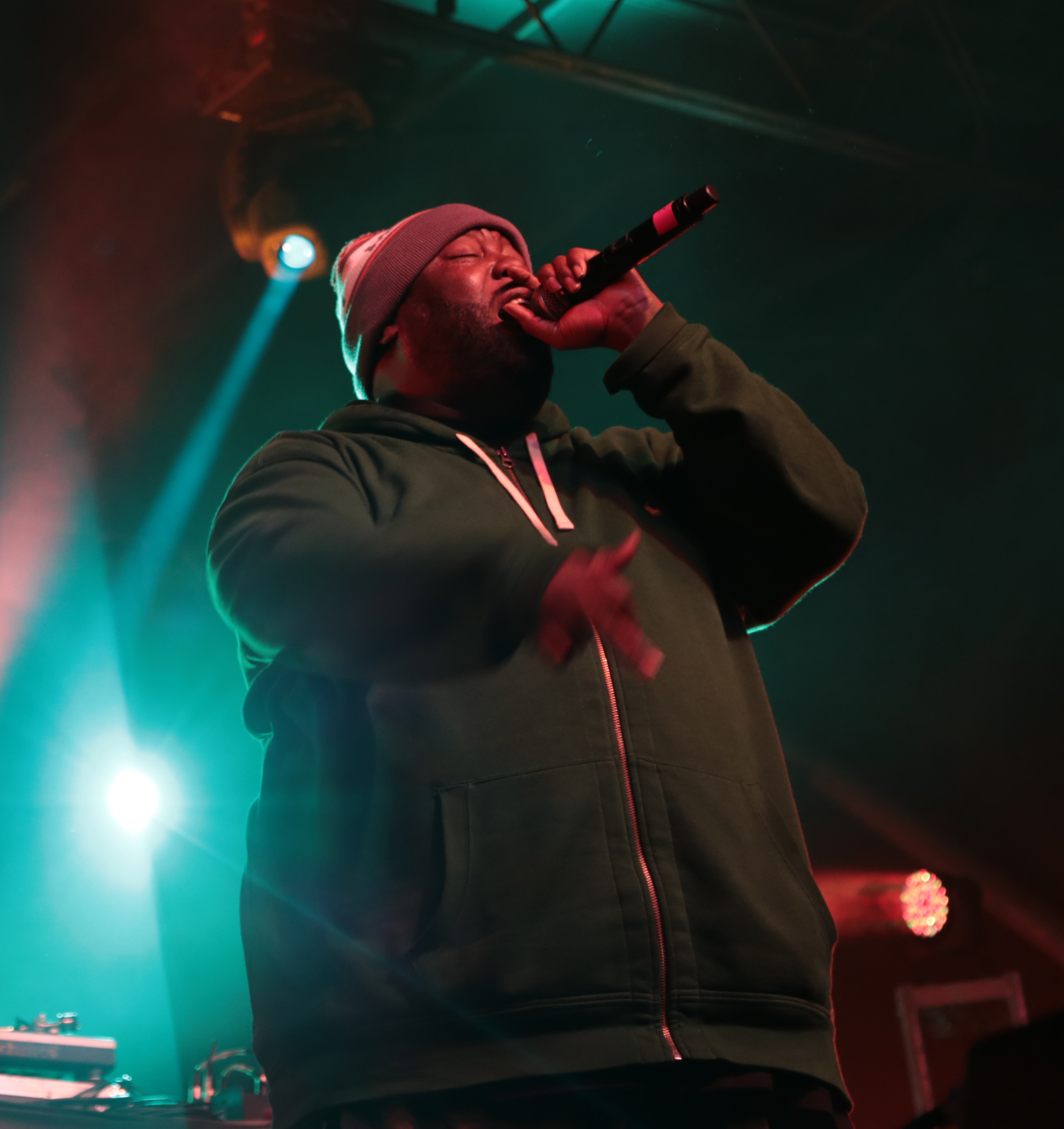
- Killer Mike performing in 2014
- Studio albums: 6
- Compilation albums: 1
- Singles: 8
- Mixtapes: 5
- Featured singles: 3
- Guest appearances: 51

The discography of American rapper and recording artist Killer Mike consists of six studio albums, three collaborative albums, five mixtapes and eleven singles (including three singles as a featured artist).

== Albums ==
=== Studio albums ===
List of studio albums, with selected chart positions and certifications
| Title | Album details | Peak chart positions | | | |
| Title | Album details | US | US R&B | US Rap | US Ind. |
|---|---|---|---|---|---|
| Monster | Released: March 11, 2003; Label: Columbia; Format: CD, digital download | 10 | 4 | — | — |
| I Pledge Allegiance to the Grind | Released: November 21, 2006; Label: Grind Time Official; Format: CD, digital download | — | — | — | — |
| I Pledge Allegiance to the Grind II | Released: July 8, 2008; Label: Grind Time Official, SMC; Format: CD, digital download | 178 | 17 | 9 | 29 |
| Pledge | Released: May 17, 2011; Label: Grind Time Official, SMC, Grand Hustle; Format: CD, digital download | 115 | 23 | 12 | 20 |
| R.A.P. Music | Released: May 15, 2012; Label: Williams Street; Format: CD, digital download | 82 | 12 | 8 | 16 |
| Michael | Released: June 16, 2023; Label: VLNS, Loma Vista; Formats: Digital download, streaming | 58 | 23 | 18 | 12 |
| Songs for Sinners & Saints | Released: August 2, 2024; Label: VLNS, Loma Vista; Formats: Digital download, streaming | — | — | — | — |

=== Collaborative albums ===
List of albums, with selected chart positions
| Title | Album details | Peak chart positions | | |
| Title | Album details | US | US R&B/HH | US Rap |
|---|---|---|---|---|
| Run the Jewels (with El-P as Run the Jewels) | Released: June 26, 2013; Label: Fool's Gold; Formats CD, vinyl, digital download | — | 27 | 21 |
| Run the Jewels 2 (with El-P as Run the Jewels) | Released: October 28, 2014; Label: Mass Appeal, RED; Formats CD, vinyl, digital download | 50 | 9 | 6 |
| Run the Jewels 3 (with El-P as Run the Jewels) | Released: December 24, 2016; Label: Mass Appeal, RED; Formats CD, vinyl, digital download | 13 | 1 | 1 |
| RTJ4 (with El-P as Run the Jewels) | Released: June 3, 2020; Label: Jewel Runners, BMG; Formats CD, vinyl, digital download | 10 | 7 | 7 |

=== Compilation albums ===
List of studio albums, with selected chart positions and certifications
| Title | Album details | Peak chart positions | |
| Title | Album details | US R&B | US Rap |
|---|---|---|---|
| Underground Atlanta | Released: August 31, 2009; Label: Grind Time Official, SMC; Format: CD, digital download | 34 | 10 |

=== Mixtapes ===
List of mixtapes, with year released
| Title | Album details |
|---|---|
| Home Alone Wit' Dat Crack | Released: 2004; Label: Self-released; Format: Digital download |
| The Killer | Released: August 20, 2006; Label: Self-released; Format: Digital download |
| Ghetto Extraordinary | Released: 2008; Label: Self-released; Format: Digital download |
| Anger & Ambition: The Best of Killer Mike | Released: August 13, 2009; Label: Self-released; Format: Digital download |
| Bang x3 | Released: May 6, 2011; Label: Grand Hustle; Format: Digital download |
| Sunday Morning Massacres | Released: November 23, 2014; Label: Self-released; Format: Digital download |

== Singles ==
=== As lead artist ===
List of singles, with selected chart positions, showing year released and album name
| Title | Year | Peak chart positions | | | | | | | Album |
| Title | Year | US | US R&B | US Rap | AUS | IRE | NZ | UK | Album |
|---|---|---|---|---|---|---|---|---|---|
| "Akshon (Yeah!)" (featuring Outkast) | 2002 | — | 113 | — | — | — | — | — | Monster |
| "A.D.I.D.A.S." (featuring Big Boi and Sleepy Brown) | 2003 | 60 | 42 | 20 | 88 | 45 | 36 | 22 | Monster |
| "Get 'Em Shawty" (featuring Three 6 Mafia) | 2005 | — | — | — | — | — | — | — | The Killer |
| "2 Sides" (featuring Shawty Lo) | 2008 | — | — | — | — | — | — | — | I Pledge Allegiance to the Grind II |
| "Imma Fool Wit It" (featuring Big Kuntry King) | 2009 | — | — | — | — | — | — | — | Underground Atlanta |
| "Ready Set Go" (featuring T.I.) | 2010 | — | 110 | — | — | — | — | — | Pl3dge |
| "Big Beast" (featuring Bun B, T.I. and Trouble) | 2012 | — | — | — | — | — | — | — | R.A.P. Music |
| "Yes!" | 2021 | — | — | — | — | — | — | — | Madden NFL 22 |
| "Run" (featuring Young Thug) | 2022 | — | — | — | — | — | — | — | Michael |
| "Get Some Money" | 2022 | — | — | — | — | — | — | — | Madden NFL 23 |
| "Detonator" (featuring Rock D The Legend) | 2024 | — | — | — | — | — | — | — | Non-album single |
"—" denotes a recording that did not chart or was not released in that territory.

=== As featured artist ===
List of singles, with selected chart positions, showing year released and album name
| Title | Year | Peak chart positions | | | | | | | | | | Album |
| Title | Year | US | US R&B | US Rap | GER | IRE | NL | NZ | SWE | SWI | UK | Album |
|---|---|---|---|---|---|---|---|---|---|---|---|---|
| "The Whole World" (Outkast featuring Killer Mike and Joi) | 2001 | 19 | 8 | 21 | 30 | 24 | 39 | 4 | 26 | 79 | 19 | Big Boi and Dre Present... OutKast |
| "Land of a Million Drums" (Outkast featuring Killer Mike and Sleepy Brown) | 2002 | — | 116 | — | 59 | 38 | — | — | 49 | — | 46 | Scooby-Doo (soundtrack) |
| "Dream Eyes" (Ax featuring KIller Mike) | 2002 | — | — | — | — | — | — | — | — | — | — | —N/a |
| "Never Scared" (Bone Crusher featuring Killer Mike and T.I.) | 2003 | 26 | 8 | 6 | — | — | — | — | — | — | — | AttenCHUN! |
| "Kryptonite (I'm on It)" (Purple Ribbon All-Stars) | 2005 | — | — | — | — | — | — | — | — | — | — | Got Purp? Vol. 2 |
| "Love & Respect" (When Saints Go Machine featuring KIller Mike) | 2013 | — | — | — | — | — | — | — | — | — | — | Infinity Pool |
| "Grind" (Warbuckss featuring Killer Mike) | 2014 | — | — | — | — | — | — | — | — | — | — | Non-album single |
| "Carry On" (Tkay Maidza featuring Killer Mike) | 2016 | — | — | — | — | — | — | — | — | — | — | Tkay |
| "Savage Habits" (Little Shalimar Feat. Bun B, Killer Mike, Cuz Lightyear) | 2016 | — | — | — | — | — | — | — | — | — | — | Rubble Kings Soundtrack |
| "Kill Jill" (Big Boi featuring Killer Mike and Jeezy) | 2017 | — | — | — | — | — | — | — | — | — | — | Boomiverse |
| "Good Morning"(Black Thought featuring Pusha T, Swizz Beatz and Killer Mike) | 2020 | — | — | — | — | — | — | — | — | — | — | Streams of Thought, Vol. 3: Cain & Abel |
| "Ego Maniacs" (Ice Cube featuring KIller Mike & Busta Rhymes) | 2024 | — | — | — | — | — | — | — | — | — | — | Man Down |
| "Can't Fit In" (Peking Duk featuring KIller Mike, Nate Husser & Kingstarlight) | 2026 | — | — | — | — | — | — | — | — | — | — | Paradise |
"—" denotes a recording that did not chart or was not released in that territory.

== Promotional singles ==
List of other charted songs, with selected chart positions, showing year released and album name
| Title | Year | Peak chart positions | Album |
| Title | Year | US Christ | Album |
|---|---|---|---|
| "Headphones" (Lecrae featuring Killer Mike and T.I.) | 2025 | 31 | Reconstruction |

== Other charted songs ==
List of other charted songs, with selected chart positions, showing year released and album name
| Title | Year | Peak chart positions | Album |
| Title | Year | NZ Hot | Album |
|---|---|---|---|
| "Scientists & Engineers" (with André 3000 featuring Future and Eryn Allen Kane) | 2023 | 39 | Michael |

== Guest appearances ==
List of non-single guest appearances, with other performing artists, showing year released and album name
| Title | Year | Other artist(s) | Album |
|---|---|---|---|
| "Funkanella" | 2000 | DJ Clue, Outkast, Slimm Calhoun | Backstage: Music Inspired by the Film |
| "Snappin' & Trappin'" | 2000 | Outkast, J-Sweet | Stankonia |
| "Well" | 2001 | Slimm Calhoun | The Skinny |
| "Sho Ya Right!" | 2001 | Backbone | Concrete Law |
| "Presenting Dungeon Family" | 2001 | —N/a | Even in Darkness |
| "Curtains (DF 2nd Generation)" | 2001 | Dungeon Family | Even in Darkness |
| "Hey Baby (Stank Remix) | 2002 | No Doubt, OutKast | Non-album single |
| "Poppin' Tags" | 2002 | Jay-Z, Big Boi, Twista | The Blueprint 2: The Gift & The Curse |
| "Hustle" | 2003 | YoungBloodZ | Drankin' Patnaz |
| "What the Fuck" | 2003 | Ying Yang Twins | Me & My Brother |
| "Coast to Coast Gangstas" | 2003 | DJ Kay Slay, Bun B, Sauce Money, WC, Joe Budden | The Streetsweeper, Vol. 1 |
| "Bust" | 2003 | Outkast | Speakerboxxx/The Love Below |
| "Flip Flop Rock" | 2003 | Outkast, Jay-Z | Speakerboxxx/The Love Below |
| "Da Jump Off" | 2003 | Lil Jon, No Surrender | Certified Crunk |
| "We Ain't Playin'" | 2004 | Lil' Flip, Pastor Troy, Baby D | U Gotta Feel Me |
| "Southern Takeover" | 2005 | Chamillionaire, Pastor Troy | The Sound of Revenge |
| "Black Tee" | 2005 | Gucci Mane, Bun B, Lil Scrappy, Young Jeezy, Jody Breeze | Trap House |
| "Body Rock" | 2005 | Lil Co, Donkeeboy | Got Purp? Vol. 2 |
| "My Chrome" | 2005 | Big Boi | Got Purp? Vol. 2 |
| "Oh No" | 2005 | Big Boi, Bubba Sparxxx | XXX: State of the Union (soundtrack) |
| "Claremont Lounge" | 2006 | Bubba Sparxxx | Got Purp? Vol. 2/The Charm |
| "In Your Dreams" | 2006 | OutKast, Janelle Monáe | Idlewild |
| "Blam Blam" | 2007 | Aqua Teen Hunger Force | Aqua Teen Hunger Force Colon Movie Film for Theaters (soundtrack) |
| "Runnin Out of Bud" | 2007 | 8Ball & MJG | Ridin High |
| "Look Back at Me" | 2008 | Trina | Still da Baddest |
| "May the Force Be with You" | 2009 | XV, Mac Miller | Vizzy Zone |
| "Neighborhood" | 2009 | Chiddy Bang | The Preview (EP) |
| "That's What I Thought" | 2010 | T.I., Mac Boney | No Mercy |
| "Civil War" | 2011 | Immortal Technique, Brother Ali, Chuck D | The Martyr |
| "Slumerican Shitizen" | 2011 | Yelawolf | Radioactive |
| "Never Clockin Out (Remix)" | 2012 | Dee-1 | The Focus Tape |
| "Tougher Colder Killer" | 2012 | El-P, Despot | Cancer 4 Cure |
| "Thom Pettie" | 2012 | Big Boi, Little Dragon | Vicious Lies and Dangerous Rumors |
| "WAVIP" | 2012 | The Coup, Das Racist | Sorry to Bother You |
| "Scared of Commitment" | 2013 | Consequence, Chuuwee | —N/a |
| "Rhyme Room" | 2013 | Yelawolf, Raekwon | Trunk Muzik Returns |
| "IBM" | 2013 | Joie 13 | 13 Ravens |
| "Reign Fall" | 2013 | Chamillionaire, Scarface, Bobby Moon | Reignfall |
| "Step Aside" | 2013 | Swave Sevah | Son of a One Armed Man |
| "Insane" | 2013 | Flume | Flume: Deluxe Edition |
| "Underground Kings" | 2014 | Royce da 5'9", DJ Premier, Schoolboy Q | PRhyme |
| "The Warrior, the Philosopher, & the Rebel" | 2014 | A-Villa, Lil Fame, Cormega | Carry on Tradition |
| "If U Run" | 2015 | DJ EFN, KXNG Crooked, Webbz | Another Time |
| "Lock & Load" | 2015 | MNDR | Welcome to Los Santos |
| "Thuggin" (Remix) | 2015 | Glasses Malone, Kendrick Lamar | —N/a |
| "V.I.P." | 2015 | Kool AD, The Coup | O.K. |
| "This Ecstatic Cult" | 2016 | Lushlife, CSLSX | Ritualize |
| "Prey'er" | 2016 | Bambu | Prey for the Devil |
| "Make Em Pay" | 2016 | N.O.R.E., Sleepy Brown | Drunk Uncle |
| "Raise Hell" | 2016 | Sir the Baptist, Churchpeople | The Birth of a Nation: The Inspired By Album |
| "A.B.N." | 2016 | Big Scoob, Bumpy Knuckles | H.O.G. |
| "40 Acres" | 2016 | T.I., B Rossi | Us or Else: Letter to the System |
| "Confess" | 2017 | Logic | Everybody |
| "Made Men" | 2017 | Big Boi, Kurupt | Boomiverse |
| "Follow Deez" | 2017 | Big Boi, Curren$y | Boomiverse |
| "ArrowThroughSkinOutOfBlueSky" | 2018 | When Saints Go Machine | It's a Mad Love |
| "Black Power. White Powder." | 2018 | 2 Chainz | Rapture (Netflix soundtrack) |
| "Monsoon" | 2018 | The Coup | Sorry to Bother You (soundtrack) |
| "Black Neighborhood" | 2018 | Bobby Sessions | RVLTN (Chapter 1): The Divided States of AmeriKKKa |
| "Rabbit's Revenge" | 2018 | Tom Morello, Bassnectar, Big Boi | The Atlas Underground |
| "Palmolive" | 2019 | Freddie Gibbs, Madlib, Pusha T | Bandana |
| "Greatness" | 2020 | WooDaRealest | —N/a |
| "Play Around" | 2020 | Statik Selektah, 2 Chainz, Conway the Machine, Allan Kingdom | The Balancing Act |
| "How I Feel" | 2020 | T.I., Eric Bellinger | The L.I.B.R.A. |
| "lower case (no cap) | 2021 | Big Boi & Sleepy Brown | Big Sleepover |
| "Sucka Free" | 2021 | Big Boi & Sleepy Brown | Big Sleepover |
| "We the Ones" (Organized Noize Remix) | 2021 | Big Boi & Sleepy Brown, Big Rube | Big Sleepover |
| "Return of the Dope Boy" | 2021 | Big Boi & Sleepy Brown, Backbone | Big Sleepover |
| "Amen" | 2021 | Young Roddy, Iceberg Black | Never Question God |
| "Black Superhero" | 2022 | Robert Glasper, Big K.R.I.T., BJ the Chicago Kid | Black Radio III |
| "Mr. Regular" | 2022 | What So Not, Oliver Tree | Anomaly |
| "Leather Walls" | 2023 | Hus Kingpin & Big Ghost LTD, Willie the Kid | Cocaine Beach |
| "The Real A" | 2023 | Young Booke, T.I. | —N/a |
| "Disgusted" | 2024 | Tech N9ne, Ordained, Hopsin | COSM |
| "Box Chevy 8" | 2024 | Yelawolf, Bub Heavy | War Story |
| "I Try" | 2024 | OMB Peezy | Still Too Deep |
| "The Source" | 2024 | Berner, Raekwon, Ghostface Killah | HOFFA |
| "Favor" | 2024 | DMX, Mary Mary | —N/a |
| "Let's Get Lifted Again" | 2024 | John Legend, Lil Wayne | Get Lifted {20th Anniversary} |
| "I Won't Lie Down" | 2025 | Busta Rhymes | Dragon Season... Equinox |
| "South Still Speaking" | 2025 | Lukah, Statik Selektah | A Lost Language Found |
| "Generational Love" | 2025 | Smoke DZA, Harry Fraud | On My Way to Berlin |
| "The Edge" | 2025 | Madlib & Your Old Droog | TBD |

== See also ==
- Run the Jewels discography
