= HipHopDX =

Online music magazine

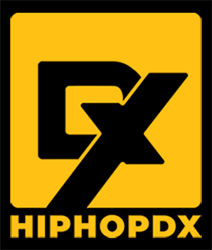
- Website type: Media
- Available in: English
- Headquarters: Los Angeles, California, U.S.
- Owner: Uproxx Studios
- Founder: Sharath Cherian
- Editor: Jerry L. Barrow
- Website: www.hiphopdx.com
- Launched: 1999
- Current status: Inactive

HipHopDX was an online magazine of hip-hop music criticism and news. HipHopDX has over 3.5M monthly readers, the website encompassing hip-hop news, interviews, music, and reviews. The website's founder and CEO is Sharath Cherian and the Head of Content is Jerry L. Barrow. HipHopDX is the flagship publication of Cheri Media Group. HipHopDX can be found on X (formerly Twitter), Instagram, Facebook, YouTube, and TikTok.

In September 2020, the website was acquired by Warner Music Group; however, the website was sold in 2024 to Uproxx Studios, managed by will.i.am, Jarret Myer, and Rich Antoniello. HipHopDX's Director of Hip Hop Journalism, Elliott Wilson, is a co-host (with DJ Hed and Jeremy Hecht) on The Bigger Picture, a weekly hip-hop debate show managed by Uproxx Studios.

HipHopDX was nominated for "Best Hip Hop Online Site" at the 2012 BET Hip Hop Awards. On September 3, 2013, The Source named HipHopDX, number three on their 2013 Digital Power 30 list, which ranks websites that are the most popular in the hip-hop industry.

As of 2026, the URL redirects to HipHopDX's Instagram page.

== Year-end awards ==
MC/Rapper of the Year

- 2006: Lupe Fiasco
- 2007: André 3000 of OutKast
- 2008: Nas
- 2009: Raekwon
- 2010: Eminem
- 2011: Tech N9ne
- 2012: Kendrick Lamar
- 2013: Kendrick Lamar
- 2014: Big K.R.I.T.
- 2015: Kendrick Lamar
- 2016: Chance the Rapper
- 2017: Kendrick Lamar
- 2018: J. Cole
- 2019: DaBaby
- 2020: Lil Baby
- 2021: Tyler, the Creator
- 2022: Kendrick Lamar
- 2023: Killer Mike

Album of the Year

- 2006: Lupe Fiasco's Food & Liquor by Lupe Fiasco
- 2007: Graduation by Kanye West
- 2008: I Pledge Allegiance to the Grind II by Killer Mike
- 2009: Only Built 4 Cuban Linx... Pt. II by Raekwon
- 2010: My Beautiful Dark Twisted Fantasy by Kanye West
- 2011: Section.80 by Kendrick Lamar
- 2012: Good Kid, M.A.A.D City by Kendrick Lamar
- 2013: Run the Jewels by Run the Jewels
- 2014: PRhyme by PRhyme
- 2015: To Pimp a Butterfly by Kendrick Lamar
- 2016: Coloring Book by Chance the Rapper
- 2017: Damn by Kendrick Lamar
- 2018: KOD by J. Cole
- 2019: Bandana by Freddie Gibbs and Madlib
- 2020: Alfredo by Freddie Gibbs and The Alchemist
- 2021: Call Me If You Get Lost by Tyler, the Creator
- 2022: Mr. Morale & the Big Steppers by Kendrick Lamar
- 2023: Michael by Killer Mike

Producer of the Year

- 2006: will.i.am
- 2007: Polow da Don
- 2008: Black Milk
- 2009: No ID
- 2010: Kanye West
- 2011: Big K.R.I.T.
- 2012: The Alchemist
- 2013: Mike Will Made It
- 2014: DJ Mustard
- 2015: Metro Boomin
- 2016: Kaytranada
- 2017: Metro Boomin
- 2018: Not awarded
- 2019: Wheezy
- 2020: Hit-Boy
- 2021: The Alchemist
- 2022: Hit-Boy
- 2023: The Alchemist

Verse of the Year

- 2006: R.A. the Rugged Man on Jedi Mind Tricks' "Uncommon Valor: A Vietnam Story"
- 2007: André 3000 on OutKast's "Da Art of Storytellin' Pt. 4"
- 2008: Joe Budden on "Who?"
- 2009: Ghostface Killah on Raekwon's "Gihad"
- 2010: Nicki Minaj on Kanye West's "Monster"
- 2011: Kendrick Lamar on "HiiiPower"
- 2012: Killer Mike on "Reagan"
- 2013: Kendrick Lamar on Big Sean's "Control"
- 2014: Big K.R.I.T. on "Mt. Olympus"
- 2015: Drake on "Back to Back"
- 2016: Chance the Rapper on Kanye West's "Ultralight Beam"
- 2017: Eminem on "The Storm"
- 2018: Jay Rock on "King's Dead"
- 2019: J. Cole on 21 Savage's "A Lot"
- 2020: Lil Baby on "The Bigger Picture"
- 2021: André 3000 on Kanye West's "Life of the Party"
- 2022: Jay-Z on DJ Khaled's "God Did"
- 2023: André 3000 on Killer Mike's "Scientists & Engineers"

Mixtape/EP of the Year

- 2008: The Bar Exam 2 by Royce da 5'9
- 2009: So Far Gone by Drake
- 2010: K.R.I.T. Wuz Here by Big K.R.I.T.
- 2013: Acid Rap by Chance the Rapper
- 2014: Tha Tour Pt. 1 by Rich Gang
- 2015: It's Better This Way by Big K.R.I.T.
- 2016: Tabernacle: Trust the Shooter by Royce da 5'9
- 2017: You Only Live 2wice by Freddie Gibbs
- 2018: Streams of Thought, Vol. 1 and Streams of Thought, Vol. 2 by Black Thought

Rising Star/Rookie/Come up of the Year

- 2007: Blu
- 2008: Wale
- 2009: Fashawn
- 2010: Yelawolf
- 2011: Action Bronson
- 2012: Joey Badass
- 2013: Chance the Rapper
- 2014: Vince Staples
- 2015: Fetty Wap
- 2016: Not awarded
- 2017: Cardi B
- 2018: Cardi B
- 2019: YBN Cordae
- 2020: Roddy Ricch
- 2021: Baby Keem
- 2022: GloRilla
- 2023: Sexyy Red

Non Hip Hop Album/R&B Album of the Year

- 2006: St. Elsewhere by Gnarls Barkley
- 2007: Back to Black by Amy Winehouse
- 2008: Seeing Sounds by N.E.R.D
- 2009: Love the Future by Chester French
- 2010: The Lady Killer by Cee Lo Green
- 2011: Nostalgia, Ultra by Frank Ocean
- 2012: Channel Orange by Frank Ocean
- 2013: The 20/20 Experience by Justin Timberlake
- 2014: Souled Out by Jhene Aiko
- 2015: Beauty Behind the Madness by The Weeknd
- 2016: A Seat at the Table by Solange
- 2017: Ctrl by SZA
- 2018: Oxnard by Anderson .Paak
- 2019: Over It by Summer Walker
- 2020: After Hours by The Weeknd
- 2021: Still Over It by Summer Walker
- 2022: Renaissance by Beyoncé
- 2023: SOS by SZA

Slept On/Underrated Album of the Year

- 2007: Below the Heavens by Blu & Exile
- 2008: Johnson&Jonson by Johnson&Jonson
- 2009: Born and Raised by Cormega
- 2010: Nineteen Ninety Now by Celph Titled & Buckwild
- 2011: Dr. Lecter by Action Bronson
- 2012: Trophies by O.C. and Apollo Brown
- 2013: Czarface by Czarface
- 2014: Faces by Mac Miller
- 2015: The Good Fight by Oddisee
- 2016: Handshakes with Snakes by Apathy
- 2017: At What Cost by GoldLink
- 2018: Harlan & Alondra by Buddy

Comeback of the Year

- 2007: UGK
- 2008: Q-Tip
- 2009: Wu-Tang Clan
- 2010: Lloyd Banks
- 2011: Common
- 2012: Juicy J
- 2013: Mac Miller
- 2014: G-Unit
- 2015: Dr. Dre
- 2016: A Tribe Called Quest
- 2017: Jay-Z
- 2018: Meek Mill
- 2019: Gang Starr
- 2020: Jay Electronica
- 2021: Isaiah Rashad
- 2022: Jeezy
- 2023: Gunna

Music Video of the Year

- 2009: "3 A.M." by Eminem
- 2010: "Window Seat" by Erykah Badu
- 2011: "Yonkers" by Tyler, The Creator
- 2012: "Daughter" by Nas
- 2013: "Started from the Bottom" by Drake
- 2014: "i" by Kendrick Lamar
- 2015: "Alright" by Kendrick Lamar
- 2016: "Lemonade" by Beyonce
- 2017: "HUMBLE" by Kendrick Lamar
- 2018: "This is America" by Childish Gambino
- 2019: "Suge" by DaBaby
- 2020: "Life is Good" by Future feat. Drake
- 2021: "MONTERO (Call Me By Your Name)" by Lil Nas X
- 2022: "The Heart Part 5" by Kendrick Lamar
- 2023: "First Person Shooter" by Drake feat. J. Cole

R&B Artist of the Year

- 2019: Summer Walker
- 2020: Abel Tesfaye
- 2021: Snoh Aalegra
- 2022: Brent Faiyaz
- 2023: SZA

R&B Song of the Year

- 2016: "Needed Me" by Rihanna
- 2017: "Love Galore" by SZA
- 2018: Not awarded
- 2019: "No Guidance" by Chris Brown feat. Drake
- 2020: "Do it" by Chloe x Halle
- 2021: "Good Days" by SZA
- 2022: "Bad Habit" by Steve Lacy
- 2023: "Kill Bill" by SZA

Beat of the Year

- 2015: "F*ck Up Some Commas" by Future
- 2016: "OOOUUU" by Young M.A
- 2017: "Mask Off" by Future
- 2018: "SICKO MODE" by Travis Scott
- 2019: "Hot" by Young Thug
- 2020: "The Box" by Roddy Ricch
- 2021: "family ties" by Baby Keem
- 2022: "Johnny P's Caddy" by Benny the Butcher & J. Cole
- 2023: "fukumean" by Gunna

Collab of the Year

- 2009: "Forever" by Eminem feat. Drake, Kanye West, & Lil Wayne
- 2010: "Monster" by Kanye West feat. Rick Ross, Jay-Z, Nicki Minaj, & Bon Iver
- 2011: "Interlude" by Lil Wayne feat. Tech N9ne & André 3000
- 2012: "Mercy" by Kanye West feat. Big Sean, 2 Chainz, & Pusha T
- 2013: Not awarded
- 2014: "Kingdom" by Common feat. Vince Staples
- 2015: "Where Ya At" by Future feat. Drake
- 2016: "All the Way Up" by Fat Joe, Remy Ma, French Montana feat. Infared
- 2017: "Crew" by GoldLink feat. Shy Glizzy & Brent Faiyaz
- 2018: "SICKO MODE" by Travis Scott feat. Drake, Swae Lee, & Big Hawk
- 2019: "Going Bad" by Meek Mill feat. Drake
- 2020: "Life is Good" by Future feat. Drake
- 2021: "family ties" by Baby Keem feat. Kendrick Lamar
- 2022: "Tomorrow 2" by GloRilla feat. Cardi B
- 2023: Not awarded

Hip Hop Song of the Year

- 2019: "Suge" by DaBaby
- 2020: "The Bigger Picture" by Lil Baby
- 2021: "WUSYANAME" by Tyler, the Creator feat. YoungBoy Never Broke Again
- 2022: "Johnny P's Caddy" by Benny the Butcher & J. Cole
- 2023: "SkeeYee" by Sexyy Red
