= Daniel Garcia (director) =

American director (born 1975)

- Born: July 24, 1975 (age 50)
- Occupations: Music video and commercial director

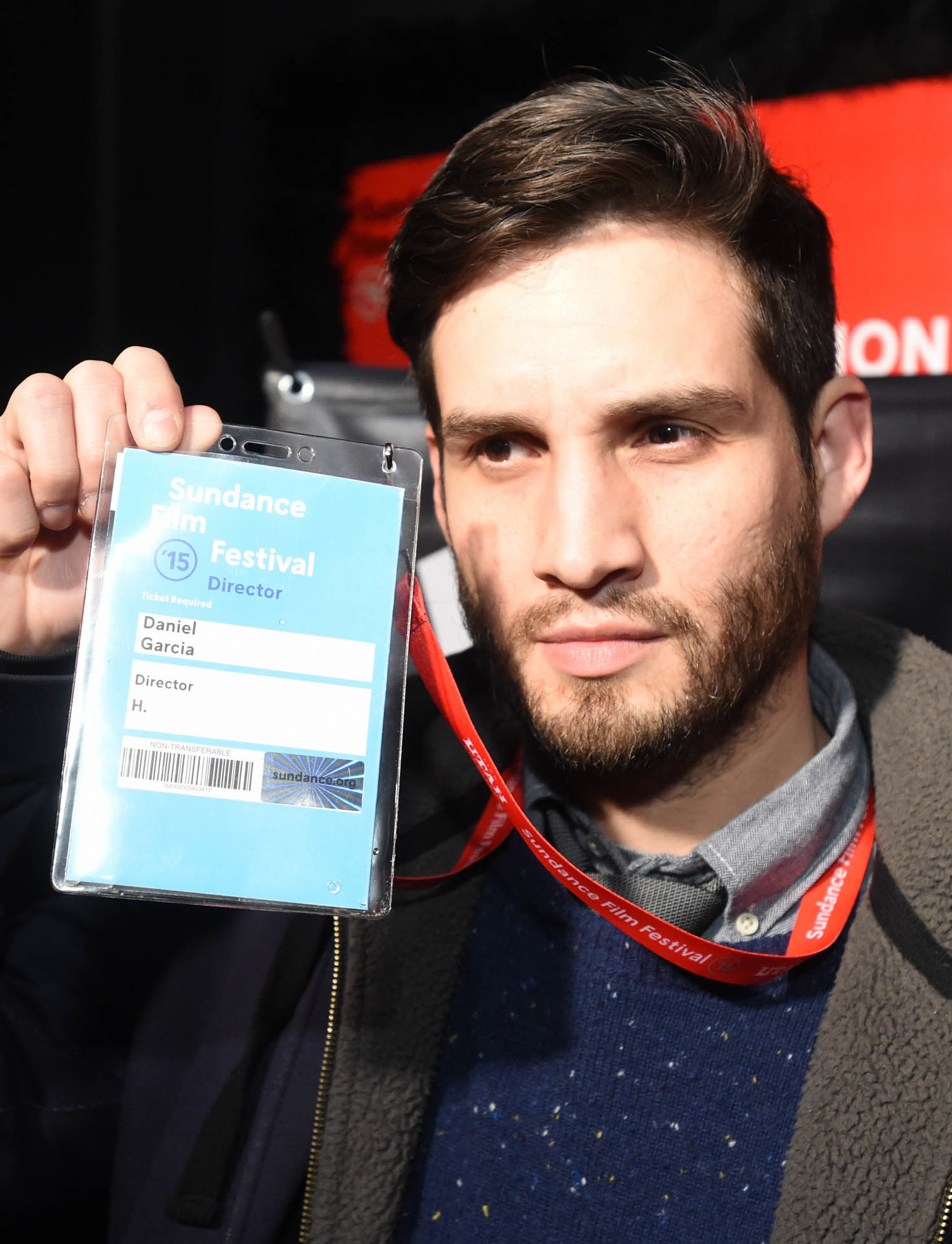
Daniel Garcia

Daniel Garcia (born July 24, 1975) is an American music video and commercial director.

Garcia began his career designing labels for santería potions sold at local botánicas. Soon after, he landed at advertising agency DDB and, while working overtime, rounded up enough clients to go freelance.

Garcia practices computer animation and graphic design, and has directed videos for such bands as Mates of State, The Go! Team, and TV on the Radio, whose video for "Me-I" won the award for Best Music Video at the 2008 SXSW Festival. Previous videos also received recognition, including Madvillain's "Monkey Suite", which was nominated for an MTV Woodie in 2007, and J Dilla's "Nothing Like This", which played at the Animation Block Party and Pictoplasma, and was nominated for an award at the Ottawa International Animation Festival. In addition to videos, Garcia also directs commercials, including several spots for Nike, and dabbles in photography and print design.

== Filmography ==
=== Music videos ===
Year	Song	Artist	Notes
2006	"Monkey Suite"	Madvillain	
2006	"Take It Back"	Madlib	
2006	"Nothing Like This"	J Dilla	
2006	"Flyentology"	El-P	
2007	"Me-I"	TV on the Radio	Winner, Best Music Video, South by Southwest
2008	"Milk Crisis"	The Go! Team	
2008	"Get Better"	Mates of State	
2008	"Infinitum"	Flying Lotus	
2009	"Life Like"	The Rosebuds	
2009	"True Love 1980"	Ash	
2010	"Oh My God"	Cults	
2010	"Drunk Girls (Holy Ghost! Remix)"	LCD Soundsystem	
2010	"Twincest"	Le Sexoflex	
2011	"Pyramid of the Sun"	Maserati	
2011	"Gone Again"	Best Coast	
2012	"Reagan"	Killer Mike	
2012	"Hall of Masters"	Absu	
2013	"Amazing Disguise"	The Stars	
2013	"Hunter"	Phaseone	
2014	"Coupe"	Future	
2015	"Deal With the Devil"	King Dude	
2017	"Crypt of Lost Styles"	Mr. Lif And Brass Menažeri Balkan Brass Band	

=== Short films ===
- "BoyCatBird in City Suckers" (2008)
- "The Most Dangerous Game" (2013)
- "Jumby" (2014)
- "El Cuco" (2016)
- "The Accidental Chrononaut" (2016)
- "Undefeated" (2017)
- "Emotions" (2017)
- "Wizard Skull" (2017)
- "El Cuco Is Hungry" (2018)

== Awards and nominations ==
Year	Project	Awards & Nominations
2007	"Nothing Like This" (J Dilla)	Ottawa International Film Festival – Music Video
2007	"Me-I" (TV on the Radio)	Ottawa International Film Festival – Music Video
2007	"Me-I" (TV on the Radio)	BAM Animation Block Party – Best Music Video
2008	"Monkey Suite" (Madvillain)	MTV Woodies – Best Left of Center Video
2008	"Me-I" (TV on the Radio)	South by Southwest – Best Music Video
2009	"Me-I" (TV on the Radio)	Garden State Film Festival – Music Video
2009	"Get Better" (Mates of State)	Pictoplasma Film Festival, Berlin – Music Video
2009	"Stop the Suffering" (Pert)	MENA Award Ceremony, Meribel, France – Grand Prix
2009	"Infinitum" (Flying Lotus)	Brooklyn Film Festival – Audience Award
2010	"True Love 1980" (Ash)	Garden State Film Festival – Music Video
2010	"Nothing Like This" (J Dilla)	Brooklyn Academy of Music – Music Video
2010	"Twincest" (Le Sexoflex)	Iris - International Animation Festival, Brazil – Music Video
2010	"Twincest" (Le Sexoflex)	Ottawa International Film Festival – Nominated, Music Video
2010	"Twincest" (Le Sexoflex)	Inside Out Film and Video Festival – Nominated, Music Video
2010	"Twincest" (Le Sexoflex)	Humpfest Film Festival, Seattle – Finalist, Music Video
2011	"Twincest" (Le Sexoflex)	Citrus Cel Animation Festival (Jacksonville, FL) – Music Video
2011	"Drunk Girls" (LCD Soundsystem)	Filmed by Bike Festival (Portland, OR) – Music Video
2012	"Me-I" (TV on the Radio)	RGBfilm (Leeuwarden, Netherlands – Music Video
2013	"Reagan" (Killer Mike)	Seattle International Film Festival – Music Video
2013	"Reagan" (Killer Mike)	Chicago International Movies and Music Festival – Music Video
2013	"Reagan" (Killer Mike)	Ann Arbor Film Festival – Music Video
2013	"Reagan" (Killer Mike)	Atlanta Film Festival – Music Video
2013	"Reagan" (Killer Mike)	South by Southwest – Official Selection
2014	"The Most Dangerous Game"	YoFiFest – Official Selection
2015	"Jumby"	Project Greenlight Greenie – Official Selection
2015	"Coupe" (Future)	SUPERTOON — Official Selection
2015	"Coupe" (Future)	VOTD.tv — Winner
2015	"Coupe" (Future)	Bare Bones Film Festival — Official Selection
2015	"Coupe" (Future)	Atlanta Film Festival – Official Selection 2015
2015	"Coupe" (Future)	Ann Arbor Film Festival – Official Selection
2016	"Adult Swim Singles"	Silver Telly Award
2017	"Squidbillies ID"	Sommets du cinéma d'animation
