= Songs for Sinners & Saints =

2024 studio album by Michael & The Mighty Midnight Revival

Studio album by Michael & the Mighty Midnight Revival
- Released: August 2, 2024
- Genre: Gospel; Southern hip-hop
- Length: 39:26
- Label: VLNS; Loma Vista
- Producer: Belly Gang Kushington; Warryn Campbell; Cutmaster Swiff; Cuz Lightyear; DJ Paul; Cory Henry; Mando; Tec Beatz; Treedot; Twhy Xclusive

Killer Mike chronology
| Michael (2023) | Songs for Sinners & Saints (2024) |

Songs for Sinners & Saints (released as Michael & the Mighty Midnight Revival, Songs for Sinners and Saints) is the seventh studio album by American rapper Killer Mike. It was released in collaboration with his gospel choir, The Mighty Midnight Revival, composed of Lena Byrd Miles, Alicia Peters-Jordan, Jori, Adonica Nunn, Jordan Alyssa and Troy Durden.

A follow-up to Michael, it was released on August 2, 2024. It has 10 songs, and contains guest appearances from Offset, Blxst, Anthony Hamilton, Key Glock and Project Pat.

== Background ==
On June 30, 2024, Killer Mike released the first single, "Humble Me", which details his arrest at the 66th Annual Grammy Awards. He later announced Songs for Sinners & Saints on July 29, 2024, for release on August 2.

The song "Slummer 4 Junkies" is a rework of two songs from Michael, "Slummer" and "Something for Junkies", and interpolated "Everyday People" by Sly and the Family Stone. The song "Exit 9 (Scenic Route)" is a rework of the Michael song "Exit 9" and is a tribute to Rico Wade, who died in April 2024. The song "Still Talk'n That Shit" is a rework of the Michael song "Talk'n That Shit", and is about Killer Mike's haters. Lyrically, the album is based on Killer Mike's time in church.

Before the release, Killer Mike performed at the Blue Note Jazz Club nightly, from July 29 to 31. The final show featured El-P, his partner in Run the Jewels. Afterwards, he released the album for free download until August 2.

== Reception ==
Professional ratings
Aggregate scores
| Source | Rating |
|---|---|
| Metacritic | 71/100 |
Review scores
| Source | Rating |
| Clash | 8/10 |
| Kitty Empire and The Guardian | 4/5 stars |
| Pitchfork | 7.0/10 |

The album received mostly positive review from Rolling Stone, which said: "Songs for Saints and Sinners a solid piece of fan service for anyone who enjoyed watching the underground king spend the last 12 months scooping up Grammys and BET Awards". Clash rated the album an 8/10, saying: "Killer Mike offers up more bravura creativity right at the finish line. 'Michael & The Mighty Midnight Revival: Songs For Sinners And Saints' may be unwieldy, but its inviting, and has so much to explore". Kitty Empire of The Guardian rated the album 4 out of 5 stars.

== Track listing ==
Songs for Sinners & Saints track listing
| No. | Title | Writer(s) | Producer(s) | Length |
|---|---|---|---|---|
| 1. | "Bussin Bricks Intro" | Michael Render; Archie Hall; Otis Redding | Cutmaster Swiff | 1:36 |
| 2. | "Nobody Knows" (with Anthony Hamilton) | Render; Thomas Lee Barrett Jr.; Warryn Campbell; Anthony Hamilton; Hall | Cutmaster Swiff | 3:06 |
| 3. | "Humble Me" | Render; Campbell; Cory Henry; Bryan Jones; Brandon Sewell | Henry; Cuz Lightyear; Tec Beatz | 2:57 |
| 4. | "Higher Level" | Render; Campbell; Jones; Tanner Ott; Sewell | Cuz Lightyear; Treedot; Tec Beatz^{[m]} | 3:50 |
| 5. | "Exit 9 (Scenic Route)" (with Offset and Blxst) | Render; Matthew Burdette; Kiari Cephus; Campbell; Jones | Cuz Lightyear; Campbell; Da Honorable C.N.O.T.E.^{[m]} | 3:38 |
| 6. | "Lord Prepare Me" (with Belly Gang Kushington featuring Jane Handcock and Adonica Nunn) | Render; Madison Anderson; Campbell; Jones; Celio Santiago; Myariah Summers; Victor Thomas | Belly Gang Kushington; Cuz Lightyear; Mando | 5:31 |
| 7. | "Slummer 4 Junkies" | Render; Campbell; Kevin Garnett; Jones; Ott | Cuz Lightyear; Treedot; Campbell; P-Lo^{[m]} | 10:20 |
| 8. | "Had to Go Get It" (with Troy Durden) | Render; Campbell; Jones; Harold Lilly; Ott | Cuz Lightyear; Treedot; Campbell | 2:02 |
| 9. | "'97 3-6 Freestyle" | Render; Paul Beauregard; Campbell; Tim Moore | DJ Paul; Twhy Xclusive | 3:25 |
| 10. | "Still Talk'n That Shit" (with Key Glock and Project Pat) | Render; Beauregard; Moore | Cuz Lightyear; DJ Paul; Twhy Xclusive | 3:01 |
| Total length: | | | | 39:26 |

CD bonus track
| No. | Title | Writer(s) | Producer(s) | Length |
|---|---|---|---|---|
| 11. | "High & Holy (Warryn's Groove)" (featuring Ty Dolla Sign) | Render; Campbell; Jones | Campbell; Cuz Lightyear | 5:20 |

Note

- ^{^[m]} signifies a music producer

Samples

- "Nobody Knows" contains an interpolation of "Nobody Knows (Ladas Road)" by Loyle Carner.

== Personnel ==
Michael & the Midnight Revival

- Killer Mike – vocals
- Adonica Nunn – additional vocals (tracks 4, 7), vocals (6)
- Jori Nunn – additional vocals (tracks 4, 7)
- Troy Durden – additional vocals (tracks 5, 7), vocals (8)
- Lena Byrd Miles – additional vocals (tracks 5, 7)
- Alicia Peters-Jordan – additional vocals (track 7)
- Jordan Alyssa – additional vocals (track 7)

Additional musicians

- Anthony Hamilton – vocals (track 2)
- Warryn Campbell – keyboards (tracks 3–9); bass guitar, guitar (5–8)
- Blxst – vocals (track 5)
- Offset – vocals (track 5)
- Belly Gang Kushington – vocals (track 6)
- Jane Handcock – vocals (track 6)
- Jarae – vocals (track 6)
- Bishop Andrew Potter – voice (track 7)
- Key Glock – vocals (track 10)
- Project Pat – vocals (track 10)

Technical

- Nicolas De Porcel – mastering
- David Yungin Kim – mixing (tracks 1, 2, 7, 10)
- Migui Maloles – mixing (tracks 3–6, 8, 9)
- Teddrick Palmer – engineering (tracks 1, 2)
- "Greazy" Wil Anspach – engineering (tracks 2–10)
- Tanner "Treedot" Ott – engineering (tracks 2–8, 10)
- Elliot Carter – engineering (tracks 2, 6)
- Ira "Mixit I.P." Parker – engineering (track 2)
- Chris Kahn – engineering (track 3)
- Tucker Andrew – engineering (tracks 4–8)
- Tyler Shields – engineering (tracks 4–6, 8)
- Ryan DeRemer – engineering (tracks 5–8)
- Jay Flemming – engineering (tracks 5, 7)
- Franklin "Staxx" Palacios – engineering (track 6)
- Kayo Engineering – engineering (track 6)
- Jermaine Johnson – engineering (track 10)
- Peezymane – engineering (track 10)
- Adam Pena – mixing assistance (tracks 3–6, 8, 9)
