= Reconstruction (Lecrae album) =

Studio album by Lecrae
- Released: August 22, 2025
- Genres: Contemporary Christian; hip-hop; urban
- Length: 54:19
- Label: Reach Records
- Producers: Epikh Pro; S1; Joaquin Bynum; Pluss; 100graham; Amore Jones; Jeremiah Adkins; Eks; Lihtz; Milan Madelt; Deandre Hunter; Lasanna Harris; SkipOnDaBeat; WEARETHEGOOD; Weathrman; BongoByTheWay; Edgar Cutino; Fortune; Fridayy; Kvrim; Jordan Hollywood; Jon Bellion; Rogét Chahayed; TenRoc; Ayo; Channel WYA; Tywiththewifi; prodbyty; Angelo Mota; Doobie; Jack LoMastro; Mhji Grey; J.LBS, Eric "4CEN" Forcen; Tre Wright; Carvello; Jay Gogna; Kofo; Tim Suby; Caleb Brynant; Travis Tatad; Victor Thell; Alexandria Dollar; Shadox; Juberlee

Lecrae chronology
Restoration (2020)	Reconstruction (2025)

Singles from Reconstruction
- 1. "Still Here" Released: May 31, 2024; 2. "Die for the Party" Released: September 20, 2024; 3. "Tell No Lie" Released: June 27, 2025; 4. "Bless You" Released: July 25, 2025

Reconstruction is the tenth studio album by American Christian hip-hop musician Lecrae, released on August 22, 2025, via Reach Records. The album features guest appearances from Jackie Hill Perry, T.I., Killer Mike, Fridayy, Jon Bellion, Propaganda, and Hollyn.

The album was supported by the release of four singles. "Still Here" was released as the lead single on May 31, 2024, and peaked at No. 25 on the Billboard Hot Christian Songs chart. The following single, "Die for the Party", released on September 20, 2024, achieved a peak of No. 34 on the same chart. On June 27, 2025, "Tell No Lie" was released, and on July 25, 2025, "Bless You" was released.

== Release and promotion ==
On May 31, 2024, "Still Here" was released as the album's lead single. Speaking on the song, Lecrae said, "I want people to know that even if you feel left behind, people are still here…God is still here." He partnered with the nonprofit organization Cross Purpose to perform the song in various prisons in his hometown. "Still Here" was produced by Alexandria Dollar, Juberlee, Lasanna "Ace" Harris, and Shadox. It was written by Dollar, Deandre Hunter, Jeffrey Lawrence Shannon, Kasey Rashel Sims, Harris, Lecrae Moore, and Richard Earl Douglas. Connor Back and Jacob "Biz" Morris handled engineering, mixing, and mastering.

On September 11, 2024, rapper Kendrick Lamar referenced Lecrae and Dee-1 in his song "Watch the Party Die". Lecrae recorded a response track, titling it, "Die for the Party", which was officially released on September 20, 2024, as the second single from Reconstruction. The song was produced by Weathrman, and written by Elvin Shahbazian, Joel McNeill, John McNeill, John Smythe, Lecrae Moore, Million Miles, and Pudge Tribbett. Jacob "Biz" Morris engineered the song, and alongside Connor Back, he mastered and mixed.

On June 27, 2025, "Tell No Lie", featuring Jackie Hill Perry was released as the third single from Reconstruction. Lecrae spoke on the song's meaning, stating,

'Tell No Lie' is about cutting through the noise we live in every day: social media, AI, fake flexing, and the pressure to perform like everything's perfect. The truth is, most of us are just giraffes on ice skates doing our best not to fall. This song is both a mirror and a megaphone - it reflects the struggle, and it calls out the truth. Men lie, women lie, but God never lies. That's what me and Jackie Hill Perry wanted to bring to the surface.

It was produced by Plush and coproduced by Lasanna "Ace" Harris. The song was written by Asheton Hogan, Da Kidd Halk, Perry, Jaylon Ashaun, and Lecrae Moore. Connor Back mastered, while Jacob "Biz" Morris mixed. Alongside the song's release, Reconstruction was announced for release on August 22, 2025 as Lecrae's tenth studio album.

On July 25, 2025, "Bless You", with Tory D'Shaun, was released as Reconstruction's fourth single.

Lecrae revealed the album's feature to his 1,000 most active supporters, by way of a handwritten letter mailed to each of them. On July 21, 2025, in Atlanta, Georgia, Lecrae held the Reconstruction Listening Experience, sponsored by the nonprofit organization City Takers, in which more than 100 people heard a preview of the album before its scheduled release.

In addition to the August 2025 release of the Reconstruction album, Lecrae also released two music videos in promotion of the project. On September 4, 2025, he released the music video for, "Headphones," with Killer Mike and T.I. The video pays tribute to late rappers such as Nipsey Hussle, Takeoff, and Tupac. One month later on October 16, 2025 he released the music video for, "Brick for Brick," with rising Christian hip-hop artist, MEEZO! The production of the video was held at the NRG Stadium. This is home to the Houston Texans, an American football team that is a part of the National Football League.

== Music style ==
Reconstruction reflects the genres of contemporary Christian, rap, and urban.

== Tours ==
Reconstruction was supported by the Reconstruction World Tour, featuring guests Miles Minnick, Gio, 1K Phew, and Torey D'Shaun. It started on September 4 and will end on December 13, 2025, visiting 42 locations.

== Reception ==
=== Critical ===
Professional ratings
Review scores
Source	Rating
Jesus Freak Hideout	4.5/5 stars
Shatter the Standards	4/5 stars

Michael Carder, speaking for Jesus Freak Hideout, awarded the album a 4.5-out-of-5 star review, stating that "Reconstruction feels just right". Murfey Zavier of Shatter the Standards praised the album as, "arguably Lecrae's strongest album in a decade". Logan Sekulow of CCM Magazine labelled the album as "a career-defining masterpiece."

=== Commercial ===
The lead single from Reconstruction, "Still Here", peaked at No. 25 on the Billboard Hot Christian Songs chart. "Die for the Party" achieved a peak of No. 34 on the same chart. Upon release, two album tracks entered the Hot Christian Songs chart, including "Headphones" at No. 31 and "Holidaze" at No. 47. "Holidaze" later peaked at No. 9 on the UK Christian Airplay chart. The album itself debuted at No. 6 on the Top Christian Albums.

=== Accolades ===
==== Album ====
Year	Organization	Category	Result	Ref.
2026	Grammy Awards	Best Contemporary Christian Music Album	Nominated	
2026	Stellar Awards	Rap/Hip Hop Gospel Album of the Year	Won	
2026	Dove Awards	Rap/Hip Hop Album of the Year	Nominated	
2026	Dove Awards	Recorded Music Packaging of the Year	Nominated	

==== Song-specific ====
Year	Organization	Nominee / work	Category	Result	Ref.
2026	Grammy Awards	"Headphones"	Best Contemporary Christian Music Performance/Song	Nominated	
2026	BET Awards	"Headphones"	Dr. Bobby Jones Best Gospel/Inspirational Award	Won	
2026	Stellar Awards	"Headphones"	Rap/Hip Hop Song of the Year	Nominated	
2026	Dove Awards	"Bless You"	Rap/Hip Hop Recorded Song of the Year	Nominated	
2027	Grammy Awards	"Living water"	Best Contemporary Christian Music Performance/Song	Pending	

== Track listing ==
Reconstruction standard edition
No.	Title	Writer(s)	Producer(s)	Length
1.	"Reconstruction"	Emmanuel Lorenzo Gaya Gran; Larry Griffin Jr.; Lecrae Moore; Raelynn Bowman; Stuart Lowery	Epikh Pro; S1	2:38
2.	"My Story"	Alexandria Dollar; Joaquin Bynum; Lecrae Moore	Joaquin Bynum	2:28
3.	"Tell No Lie" (with Jackie Hill Perry)	Asheton Hogan; Da Kidd Halk; Jackie Hill Perry; Jaylon Ashaun; Lecrae Moore	Pluss	2:24
4.	"Brick for Brick" (with Meezo!)	Andrew "Lihtz" Howard; Graham Stiefel; Larry Griffin Jr.; Lecrae Moore; MEEZO!; Stuart Lowery	100graham; Epikh Pro; S1	2:37
5.	"Bless You" (with Torey D'Shaun)	Amore Jones; Andrew "Lihtz" Howard; Cauncey Ellison (KUR); Jeremiah Adkins; Lecrae Moore; Milan Szelcsanyi; Torey D'Shaun; Xavier "EKS" Hayes	Amore Jones; Jeremiah Adkins; Eks; Lihtz; MilanMadelt	3:27
6.	"Life"	Deandre Hunter; Edgar Ferrera; Lasanna Harris; Lecrae Moore; Quinen Coblentz; Wes Writer	Deandre Hunter; Lasanna Harris; SkipOnDaBeat; WEARETHEGOOD	1:56
7.	"Die for the Party"	Elvin Shahbazian; Joel McNeill; John McNeill; John Smythe; Lecrae Moore; Million Miles; Pudge Tribbett	Weathrman	2:33
8.	"Headphones" (with Killer Mike and T.I.)	BongoByTheWay; Clifford Harris; Lecrae Moore; Michael Render; Tyshane Thompson; William Roderick Miller	BongoByTheWay	3:41
9.	"There For You" (with Fridayy)	Edgar Cutino; Francis LeBlanc; Karim Esmail; Lecrae Moore; Rodney Montreal	Edgar Cutino; Fortune; Fridayy; Kvrim	3:25
10.	"H2O"	Austin Quinn; Edgar Ferrera; Jordan Hollywood; Lecrae Moore	Jordan Hollywood; SkipOnDaBeat	2:18
11.	"Holidaze" (with Jon Bellion)	Austin Quinn; Jason "TenRoc" Cornet; Jon Bellion; Lecrae Moore; Rogét Chahayed	Jon Bellion; Rogét Chahayed; TenRoc	3:38
12.	"Pray for Me"	Austin Owens; Dandre Hunter; Lasanna Harris; Lecrae Moore; Michael Hilton; Tyler Caldwell; Tyler Nguyen	Ayo; Channel WYA; Tywiththewifi; prodbyty	3:19
13.	"Too Much" (with Aklesso)	Aklesso Agama; Ali Barnshad; Ali Mezsi; Angelo Mota; Armon Alaghband; Deandre Hunter; Jackson Paul LoMastro; Lecrae Moore; Lewis Shoates; Mihji Grey	Angelo Mota; Doobie; Jack LoMastro; Mihji Grey	2:32
14.	"Mat at Today"	8AE; Jason Pounds; Lecrae Moore	J.LBS	2:27
15.	"Politicking" (with Propaganda)	Eric "4CEN" Forcen; Jason Petty; Lecrae Moore; Tre Wright	Eric "4CEN" Forcen; Tre Wright	2:27
16.	"Better Sober" (with Madison Ryann Ward)	Jay Gogna; Jaylon Jenkins; Jesse Christopher Blocker III; Kofo; Lasanna Harris; Lecrae Moore; Madison Ryann Ward; Nija Charles; Ryan Bert; Tim Suby; Zach Paradis; thaliano	Carvello; Jay Gogna; Kofo; Tim Suby	3:20
17.	"Cross the Ocean"	Caleb Bryant; Enzo; Lecrae Moore; Lucien Parker; Travis Tatad; Viktor Alexander Thell	Caleb Bryant; Travis Tatad; Victor Thell	2:45
18.	"Erase Me" (with Hollyn)	Elvin Shahbazian; Holly Miller; Joel McNeill; John McNeill; Lecrae Moore	Weathrman	3:18
19.	"Still Here"	Alexandria Dollar; Deandre Hunter; Jeffrey Lawrence Shannon; Kasey Rashel Sims; Lasanna Harris; Lecrae Moore; Richard Earl Douglas	Lasanna Harris; Alexandria Dollar; Shadox; Juberlee	2:55
Total length:				54:19

Reconstruction: Second Story bonus disc
No.	Title	Writer(s)	Producer(s)	Length
1.	"Resurrected"	Andrew Jason Prim; Lecrae Moore; Matthew Guzman	Prim; Marchesi	1:20
2.	"Hold That"	Edgar Ferrera Jordan Gomez; Moore; Philip Chang; Ryan Bert	Carvello; Jordan Hollywood; SkipOnDaBeat	1:49
3.	"Game 7"	Carl Paul; Isaac Thomas; Javan Hart; Hollywood; Moore; Shama Joseph	Paul; I Project; Jay Boskie; Hollywood	2:25
4.	"No One" (with Cèjae)	Jenae Shakleford; Lasanna Harris; Moore; Nija Charles; Bert	Carvello; Harris; Moore	3:06
5.	"Living Water"	Andrew "Lihtz" Howard; Joel McNeill; John McNeill; Harris; Moore; Miless	CYBR; Joel McNeill; John McNeill; Harris; Howard; Miless	2:10
6.	"Firm Foundation"	Brandon Anderson; Hidde Ament; Jakik; Moore; Super Miles; Tom Levesque	Ament; Jakik; Miles; Levesque	3:43
7.	"My Everything"	Moore	Moore	2:33
Total length:				71:25

== Charts ==
Chart performance for Reconstruction
Chart (2025)	Peak position
US Top Christian Albums (Billboard)	6
