= Reagan (song) =

2012 single by Killer Mike

Single by Killer Mike

from the album R.A.P. Music
- B-side: "Reagan - Instrumental"
- Released: November 6, 2012
- Genre: Hip hop
- Length: 4:09
- Label: Williams Street
- Songwriter: Michael Render
- Producer: Jaime Meline

Killer Mike singles chronology
"Don't Die" (2012)	"Reagan" (2012)	"Yes!" (2021)

Music video
- "Reagan" on YouTube

"Reagan" is a song by the American rapper Killer Mike from his fifth studio album R.A.P. Music (2012). Williams Street Records released it on vinyl as the album's fourth single on November 6, 2012, coinciding with U.S. Election Day. Produced by Jaime "El-P" Meline, it is a protest song which decries the late 40th U.S. president Ronald Reagan who served from 1981–1989. It received mostly positive reviews from critics and appeared on many year-end lists. An animated music video directed by Daniel Garcia was published on Pitchfork's YouTube channel on October 3, 2012.

== Lyrical content ==
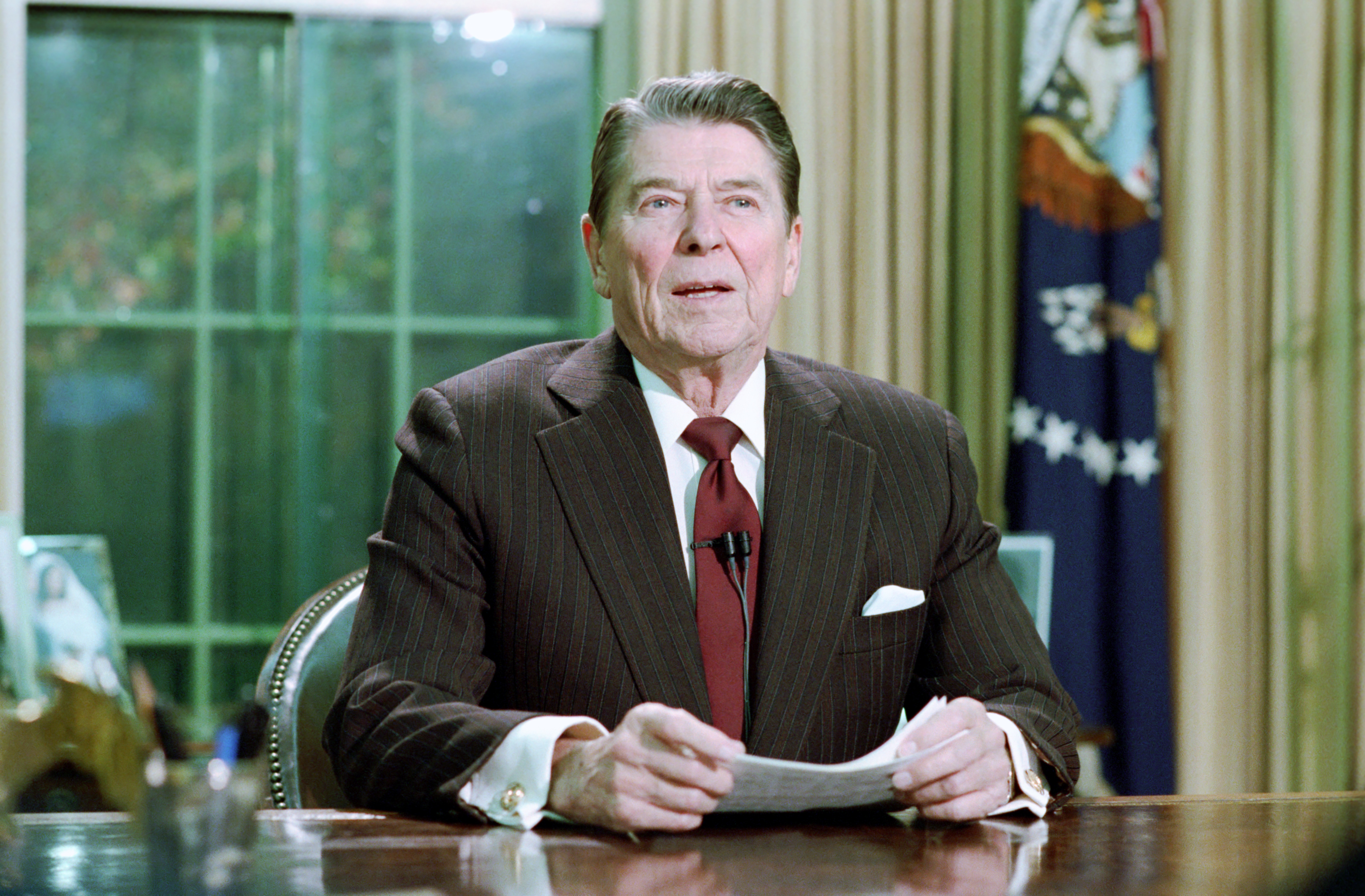
Ronald Reagan giving his address to the United States on the Iran–Contra affair on November 13, 1986. His speech is sampled in the song.

The song begins with a sample of a speech about the Iran–Contra affair by Ronald Reagan in which he denies trading "weapons for hostages". A snippet of his public apology for the aforementioned speech is placed after the first verse, which according to the analyst Michael Berry "highlight[s] the hypocrisy of his administration". In the first verse, Render announces that rappers should be "indicted for bullshit we inciting" due to his belief that they internalize Reaganomics despite their opposition of similar "economic and political systems" according to the analysts Erik Nielson and Travis L. Gosa.

In the second verse, Render runs through the names of every U.S. president since Reagan, equating him and "the Bushes, Clinton, and Obama" to all being "talking head[s] telling lies on teleprompters". Nielson and Gosa called this a critique of what they believe Render perceives to be a presidential neoliberal dominance since the 1980s, with Berry noting the line "strengthens Mike's claim that they are all complicit in a system of oppression". Render references the clause in the U.S.'s thirteenth amendment that can allow forced labor for prisoners and goes on to rap about "the racial implications of the war on drugs on black people, government surveillance, and trickle-down economics". The song ends with Render declaring "I'm glad Reagan dead" and then a chant of Reagan's full name and the number of the beast.

In an interview with HipHopDX, Render said of the lyric "Why did Reagan and Obama both go after Gadhafi?" that "I didn’t tie Ronald Reagan and Barack Obama together [...] Barack Obama compares himself to Reagan". He elaborated, stating that it was wrong for Reagan "to assassinate the leader of a sovereign nation" and that Gadhafi was one of the few extant "global advocates" for African Americans that had been killed. In an interview with NPR, he explained that "Reagan at one point was the biggest pitchman in the world" and that he "was used by a political party, by people who had vested means, to push their own agendas". Render has also stated that "Reagan" was not intended to be a political song, clarifying that in "the first verse, I'm telling rappers, we are misleading children. I accept accountability. Then I get into what government and government agency is doing."

== Reception and legacy ==
Pitchfork gave "Reagan" the designation of "Best New Track", with the critic Jayson Greene noting that it had the elements of his previous best works with the additional "cleansing power of a confession". Writing for Stereogum, Ryan Leas retrospectively called the track R.A.P. Music's centerpiece and "a sprawling document of the Reagan era". The production, which features "an ominous blend of sullen piano keys and deep synths" according to Marcus J. Moore of the BBC, was said by Roman Cooper of HipHopDX to exemplify the album's best collaborative effort between El-P and Killer Mike; he compared the fittingness of their new partnership to that of Ice Cube and The Bomb Squad. Brandon Soderberg of Spin found the song to be "as insightful as the anti-Reagan chapters of Rachel Maddow's pop-thesis Drift", but lamented the equaling of him to Barack Obama. Rebecca Schiller of NME called it the worst song of the album's latter half, saying it was outdated and meandrous.

HipHopDX awarded the second verse of "Reagan" the Verse of the Year, and the track was nominated for "Best Urban Video - International" in the 2013 UK Music Video Awards. In 2017, the English radio presenter Geoff Lloyd called the track "probably my favorite protest song from the last ten years". Spin said that the song's political grievances influenced Kendrick Lamar's 2017 album Damn.

Accolades for "Reagan"
Publication	Accolade	Year	Rank	Note
British GQ	GQ's Favourite Hip-Hop Songs of All Time	2020	Unranked	
Complex	The 25 Best Rap Verses of the Last 5 Years	2013	24	Verse 2
Complex	The 30 Most Lyrical Rap Songs of the Last 5 Years	2013	27	
NBC News	Top 10 Political Songs of 2012	2012	Unranked	
Paste	The 25 Best Music Videos of 2012	2012	24	
Pitchfork	The Top 100 Tracks of 2012	2012	37	
PopMatters	The 75 Best Songs of 2012	2012	37	
The Ringer	The Ringer's 100 Best Rap Songs of the 2010s	2021	89	
Salon	The 25 Best Hip-Hop Protest Songs Ever	2017	Unranked	
Rob Sheffield	The Top 25 Songs of 2012	2012	14	

== Music video ==
An animated music video for the song directed by Daniel Garcia was uploaded to Pitchfork's YouTube channel on October 3, 2012. Chris Martins of Spin says that the video depicts Reagan "as a mere puppet caught in a complicated web of crossed marionette strings and wagging fingers". The video starts with a protagonist walking down a street of storefronts, and the final scene portrays the Reagan administration as sci-fi robots and cyborgs.
