= I Pledge Allegiance to the Grind =

Studio album by Killer Mike
- Released: November 21, 2006
- Recorded: 2004–06
- Genre: Hip-hop
- Length: 60:48
- Label: Grind Time
- Producers: Smiff & Cash for Heatwave Productions

Killer Mike chronology
| Monster (2003) | I Pledge Allegiance to the Grind (2006) | I Pledge Allegiance to the Grind II (2008) |

Professional ratings
Review scores
| Source | Rating |
|---|---|
| AllHipHop | 3.5/5 stars |
| AllMusic | 3/5 stars |
| XXL | 4/5 stars |

I Pledge Allegiance to the Grind is the second studio album by American rapper Killer Mike. It was released on November 21, 2006, by Grind Time Rap Gang's record label Grind Time Official. The album features guest verses from each member of the Grind Time Rap Gang such as SL Jones, Narrio, Bigg Slimm, Da Bill Collector and Rock D The Legend, and it includes two guest appearances from southern hip-hop group 8Ball & MJG, and fellow American rapper Big Boi. The song "That's Life" features Killer Mike criticizing cultural and political leaders who do not care about poor people, including Oprah Winfrey, George W. Bush, Bill Clinton and Bill Cosby, a criticism that he reiterated and deepened in "That's Life II" on his album PL3DGE.

== Track listing ==
Disc One
| No. | Title | Producer(s) | Length |
|---|---|---|---|
| 1. | "The Pledge (Intro)" | Smiff & Cash | 2:08 |
| 2. | "Comin' Home Atlanta" | Smiff & Cash | 4:13 |
| 3. | "The Juggernaut" | Smiff & Cash | 4:37 |
| 4. | "Fuck You Pay Me" | Chaotic Beats | 5:49 |
| 5. | "The Next Bitch" | Smiff & Cash | 4:43 |
| 6. | "H.N.I.C." (featuring Rock D the Legend, SL Jones and Gangsta Pill) | Smiff & Cash | 5:08 |
| 7. | "One More Gram" (featuring Chemiere) | Smiff & Cash | 3:41 |
| 8. | "I'ma Shine" (featuring SL Jones and da Bill Collector) | Chaotic Beats | 5:39 |
| 9. | "Hot 107.9 Interview" | Smiff & Cash | 3:52 |
| 10. | "Promise I Will Not Lose" | Smiff & Cash | 5:01 |
| 11. | "Gat Totin'" (featuring SL Jones and Narrio) | Chaotic Beats | 5:09 |
| 12. | "G.T.R.G." (featuring Grind Time Rap Gang) | Drum Majors | 5:29 |

Disc Two
| No. | Title | Producer(s) | Length |
|---|---|---|---|
| 1. | "That's Life" | Smiff & Cash | 5:34 |
| 2. | "Deuces Wild" | Smiff & Cash | 3:31 |
| 3. | "What da Bizness Is" (featuring Bigg Slimm, da Bill Collector and Gangsta Pill) | Chaotic Beats | 4:33 |
| 4. | "Sags N' Flags" (featuring SL Jones) | Chaotic Beats | 4:52 |
| 5. | "I.C. Yah" (featuring da Bill Collector) | Chaotic Beats | 5:12 |
| 6. | "Shoot 'Em Up" (featuring Narrio) | Smiff & Cash | 4:47 |
| 7. | "Killers" | B-Don | 2:43 |
| 8. | "Paystyle" (featuring Grind Time Rap Gang) | Smiff & Cash | 2:56 |
| 9. | "Gorilla Pimpin'" (featuring 8Ball and MJG) | Mellow | 4:27 |
| 10. | "You Don't Want This Life" | Smiff & Cash | 4:41 |
| 11. | "The Pledge (Outro)" | Smiff & Cash | 4:12 |
| Total length: | | | 60:48 |

Bonus track
| No. | Title | Producer(s) | Length |
|---|---|---|---|
| 12. | "Kryptonite (Remix)" (featuring Big Boi, Busta Rhymes, Lil' Wayne and Bubba Sparxxx) | Beat Bullies | 5:35 |
