= Monster (Killer Mike album) =

Studio album by Killer Mike
- Released: March 11, 2003
- Recorded: 2002–2003
- Studio: Stankonia Recording (Atlanta, GA); Flamingo Studios (Atlanta, GA); Tree Sound Studios (Atlanta, GA); Level Heads Studio (Atlanta, GA); Hood Noize Studios; Doppler Studios (Atlanta, GA)
- Genre: Southern hip-hop
- Length: 57:59
- Label: Aquemini; Columbia
- Producer: André 3000; Cool & Dre; Mr. DJ; Swiffman; Grover Dill; Nikkii "Blue Eyes" Scroeder; Scott Fargus; Teeth Malloy

Killer Mike chronology
| Monster (2003) | I Pledge Allegiance to the Grind (2006) |

Singles from Monster
- 1. "Akshon (Yeah!)" Released: 2002; 2. "A.D.I.D.A.S." Released: July 8, 2003

Professional ratings
Review scores
| Source | Rating |
|---|---|
| AllMusic | 4/5 stars |
| Entertainment Weekly | B |
| RapReviews | 8/10 |
| Uncut | 3/5 stars |

Monster is the debut studio album by American rapper Killer Mike. It was released on March 11, 2003, via Outkast's Aquemini Records and Columbia Records. Recording sessions took place at Stankonia Recording, Flamingo Studios, Tree Sound Studios, Level Heads Studio and Doppler Studios in Atlanta, and at Hood Noize Studios. The album peaked at number 10 on the Billboard 200 and at number 4 on the Top R&B/Hip-Hop Albums chart in the United States.

== Track listing ==
| No. | Title | Writer(s) | Producer(s) | Length |
|---|---|---|---|---|
| 1. | "Monster (Intro)" (featuring Big Rube) | Russell Owens | Swiffman | 1:21 |
| 2. | "Monster" | Michael Render; David Sheats | Mr. DJ | 2:04 |
| 3. | "Akshon (Yeah!)" (featuring OutKast) | Render; Andre Benjamin; Antwan Patton; Archie Hall | André 3000 | 2:48 |
| 4. | "Rap Is Dead" | Render; Nicholas Sherwood; Nsilo Kharonde Reddick | Grover Dill; Scott Fargus | 3:23 |
| 5. | "Scared Straight" | Render; Hall | Swiffman | 4:11 |
| 6. | "All 4 U (Niecy's Song)" | Render; Andre Lyon; Marcello Valenzano; Cassette Goins; George Clinton, Jr.; Richard Dunbar | Cool & Dre | 4:05 |
| 7. | "A.D.I.D.A.S." (featuring Big Boi and Sleepy Brown) | Render; Patton; Sheats | Mr. DJ | 3:27 |
| 8. | "Creep Show" (featuring Bizarre) | Render; Rufus Johnson; Hall | Swiffman | 3:34 |
| 9. | "U Know I Love U" (featuring J-Sweet) | Render; John E.E. Smith; Benjamin | Andre 3000 | 4:22 |
| 10. | "Home of the Brave" (featuring Slimm Calhoun) | Render; Brian Loving; Lyon; Valenzano; Robin Gibb; Barry Gibb; Maurice Gibb | Cool & Dre | 4:28 |
| 11. | "L.I.V.E." | Render; Hall | Swiffman | 3:57 |
| 12. | "Blow (Get Down)" (featuring Rock D the Legend) | Render; Kristopher Bailey; Sherwood; Reddick | Blue Eyes, Silo Slugsworth | 4:01 |
| 13. | "Sex, Drugs, Rap & Roll" | Render; Sherwood; Reddick | Teeth Malloy, White Boy Leroy | 4:05 |
| 14. | "Dragon" (featuring Fass Black) | Render; F. Williams; Payton Adams; Sherwood; Reddick | Mister C-Lo, Blue Eyes | 3:44 |
| 15. | "Re-Akshon (Remix)" (featuring T.I., Bone Crusher and Bun B) | Render; Benjamin; Patton; Hall | André 3000 | 4:35 |
| 30. | "Hard Nard" or "Hand On The Nine, Finger On The Trigger" (featuring Stephen Carrington) | | Swiffman | 2:58 |
| Total length: | | | | 57:59 |

Notes

- Tracks 16 to 29 are all blank tracks, each four seconds in duration.

== Chart positions ==
=== Weekly charts ===
| Chart (2003) | Peak position |
|---|---|
| US Billboard 200 | 10 |
| US Top R&B/Hip-Hop Albums (Billboard) | 4 |

=== Year-end charts ===
| Chart (2003) | Position |
|---|---|
| US Top R&B/Hip-Hop Albums (Billboard) | 88 |
