= I Pledge Allegiance to the Grind II =

2008 studio album by Killer Mike

Studio album by Killer Mike
- Released: July 8, 2008
- Recorded: October 2007 – January 2008
- Genre: Hip-hop
- Length: 1:15:31
- Label: Grind Time; SMC; Fontana
- Producer: Young Sears; CKP Productions; Wonder Aillo; Tha Bizness; Cutmaster Swiff; The Cancer; Kidz With Machine Gunz; No I.D.; Tyrice Jones; X.P.; Smiff & Cash; B Don; D.R.U.G.S. Beats; Tec Beatz; Malay

Killer Mike chronology
I Pledge Allegiance to the Grind (2006)	I Pledge Allegiance to the Grind II (2008)	Pledge (2011)

Singles from I Pledge Allegiance to the Grind II
- 1. "2 Sides" Released: 2008

Professional ratings
Review scores
Source	Rating
AllMusic	3.5/5 stars
Cokemachineglow	77%
DJBooth	3.5/5 stars
HipHopDX	4/5 stars
IGN	(8.5/10)
PopMatters	4/5 stars
RapReviews	4/5 stars
Spin	3/5 stars
XXL	4/5 stars

I Pledge Allegiance to the Grind II is the third studio album by American rapper Killer Mike. It was released on July 8, 2008, by Grind Time Official and SMC Recordings. The album features guest appearances from 8Ball & MJG, Chamillionaire and Ice Cube, among others. His collaborations with UGK, Trae and Yo Gotti were also announced, but did not appear on the final track list of the album. Starting January 13, 2010, Killer Mike has authorized this album to be downloaded for free by fans as an effort to promote his forthcoming album.

== Track listing ==
I Pledge Allegiance to the Grind II track listing
No.	Title	Producer(s)	Length
1.	"Intro"	Brandon Bailey; Tec Beatz	4:26
2.	"10 G's"	Young Sears	3:26
3.	"Can You Hear Me"	CKP	3:23
4.	"2 Sides" (featuring Shawty Lo)	Wonder Arillo	3:29
5.	"Pressure" (featuring Ice Cube)	Tha Bizness	5:31
6.	"Big Money, Big Cars" (featuring Chamillionaire and Messy Marv)	Cutmaster Swiff	5:00
7.	"God in the Building"	The Cancer; Kidz with Machine Gunz; No I.D. (co.)	4:24
8.	"Super Clean / Super Hard" (featuring 8Ball and MJG)	Tyrice Jones	5:39
9.	"Woke Up This Mornin'"	Chris Crak	4:14
10.	"Bang!"	CKP	3:46
11.	"Grandma's House"	X.P.	5:13
12.	"If I Can't Eat Right" (featuring Gangsta Pill and Rochelle Fox)	Young Sears	5:22
13.	"I Gotcha"	Smiff & Cash	4:09
14.	"I'm the Shit!!!"	B-Don	4:23
15.	"Can You Buy That" (featuring Rock D the Legend)	D.R.U.G.S Beats	3:46
16.	"You See It" (featuring SL Jones)	Tec Beatz	4:17
17.	"Good-Bye (City of Dope)"	Malay	5:03
Total length:			75:31

== Charts ==
Chart performance for I Pledge Allegiance to the Grind II
Chart (2008)	Peak position
US Billboard 200	178
US Independent Albums (Billboard)	29
US Top R&B/Hip-Hop Albums (Billboard)	17
