= R.A.P. Music =

Studio album by Killer Mike
- Released: May 15, 2012
- Recorded: 2011
- Genre: Southern hip-hop
- Length: 45:55
- Label: Williams Street
- Producer: El-P

Killer Mike chronology
Pledge (2011)	R.A.P. Music (2012)	Michael (2023)

Singles from Rap Music
- 1. "Big Beast" Released: February 13, 2012; 2. "Untitled" Released: March 16, 2012; 3. "Don't Die" Released: April 2, 2012; 4. "Reagan" Released: November 6, 2012

R.A.P. Music is the fifth studio album by American rapper Killer Mike. It was released through Williams Street Records on May 15, 2012. The "R.A.P." in the album's title is a backronym for "Rebellious African People". Production was handled by rapper and producer Jaime "El-P" Meline; the album was the first collaboration between Killer Mike and El-P, who would later form the critically acclaimed duo Run the Jewels.

== Music and lyrics ==
In 2012, on NPR, Killer Mike explained his song "Reagan": "Ronald Reagan was an actor. He was a pitchman at first, and so people naturally trust him. He understood how to weave magic when he was speaking, and that's what we as entertainers do. So when Jay-Z tells you to buy some Reeboks, it means more. Ronald Reagan at one point was the biggest pitchman in the world. I think that Reagan was used by a political party, by people who had vested means, to push their own agendas."

== Reception ==
=== Critical response ===
Professional ratings
Aggregate scores
Source	Rating
AnyDecentMusic?	8.1/10
Metacritic	85/100
Review scores
Source	Rating
AllMusic	5/5 stars
The A.V. Club	B+
Chicago Tribune	4/4 stars
The Irish Times	4/5 stars
NME	5/10
Pitchfork	8.6/10
Q	4/5 stars
Rolling Stone	3.5/5 stars
Spin	9/10
XXL	4/5

R.A.P. Music received widespread acclaim from music critics. At Metacritic, which assigns a weighted average rating out of 100 to reviews from mainstream critics, the album received an weighted mean average score of 85, based on 27 reviews, which indicates "universal acclaim". Among those who reviewed the album positively was AllMusic editor David Jeffries, who stated "rapper Killer Mike already had an incredibly strong discography before R.A.P. Music landed [...] Revolutionary stuff and absolutely no fluff, R.A.P. Music is outstanding." Evan Rytlewski of The A.V. Club praised the album's production and Mike's politically charged lyrics and wrote "[R.A.P. Music] feels like the culmination of his unusual career." Pitchfork's Ian Cohen designated it "Best New Music" and noted that "even if R.A.P. Music doesn't break enough rules or have enough of a platform to reach the levels of Fear of a Black Planet or Straight Outta Compton or Death Certificate . . . it does come off as the kind of powerful mid-career album those acts should've been able to make as hip-hop's elder spokesmen". Christopher Weingarten of Spin wrote: "A child of the '80s and a student of the Internet, Killer Mike is as exciting and wildly unclassifiable as hip-hop gets: New York noise and country shit, nods to when rap was punk and crunk was pop, Ice Cube before he needed hooks, David Banner before he needed to whisper, and Willie D before he needed anybody." Sputnikmusic staff Sobhi Youssef praised El-P's synth-bass-heavy production and Mike's lyricism, and praised the album as "a hip-hop masterpiece to be remembered for years to come".

In a less positive review, NME writer Henry Barnes stated that "Mike has dabbled with politics in the past, and even made unlikely forays into experimental soul, but R.A.P. Music lacks the fury and vitality that usually sustains him. The ambition is to be applauded, but half the album's a grind. And not the good kind."

=== Accolades ===
Publication	Accolade	Rank	Ref.
AllMusic	Best of 2012	15	
Beats per Minute	The Top 50 Albums of 2012	23	
BrooklynVegan	141 Best Albums of the 2010s	101	
Chicago Tribune (Greg Kot)	Top 10 Albums of 2012	4	
Cokemachineglow	Top 50 Albums 2012	9	
Complex	The 50 Best Albums of 2012	32	
Consequence of Sound	Top 50 Albums of 2012	6	
Crack Magazine	The Top 100 Albums of 2012	66	
Drowned in Sound	Favourite Albums of 2012	18	
Entertainment Weekly	10 Best Albums of 2012	6	
Exclaim!	Best Albums of 2012: Top 50 Albums of the Year	3	
Gigwise	Albums of the Year	18	
Gorilla vs. Bear	Albums of 2012	11	
The Guardian	Best Albums of 2012	39	
No Ripcord	Top 50 Albums Of 2012	32	
NPR Music	50 Favorite Albums Of 2012	Unranked	
Paste	The 50 Best Albums of 2012	29	
Pitchfork	The Top 50 Albums of 2012	13	
Pitchfork	The 100 Best Albums of the Decade So Far (2010–14)	70	
PopMatters	The 75 Best Albums of 2012	6	
PopMatters	The Best Hip-Hop of 2012	1	
Pretty Much Amazing	Best Albums of 2012	16	
The Quietus	Albums of the Year 2012	35	
Rolling Stone	50 Best Albums of 2012	20	
Rolling Stone	The 200 Greatest Hip-Hop Albums of All Time	133	
Spinner	The 50 Best Albums of 2012	18	
Spin	50 Best Albums of 2012	8	
Stereogum	Top 50 Albums of 2012	23	
Time	Top 10 Everything of 2012: Albums	10	
Tiny Mix Tapes	Favorite 50 Albums of 2012	43	
Treble	Top 50 Albums of 2012	9	
The Village Voice	Pazz & Jop	8	
Vulture	Top Ten Albums of 2012	7	
The Wire	2012 Rewind: Releases of the Year	27	

== Track listing ==
All songs produced by El-P.

R.A.P. Music track listing
No.	Title	Writer(s)	Length
1.	"Big Beast" (featuring Bun B, T.I., and Trouble)	Michael Render; Bernard Freeman; Clifford Harris, Jr.; Mariel Orr; Jaime Meline	3:54
2.	"Untitled" (featuring Scar)	Render; Terrance "Scar" Smith; Meline	3:54
3.	"Go!"	Render; Meline	1:54
4.	"Southern Fried"	Render; Meline	4:37
5.	"JoJo's Chillin"	Render; Meline	2:57
6.	"Reagan"	Render; Meline	4:10
7.	"Don't Die"	Render; Meline	4:08
8.	"Ghetto Gospel"	Render; Meline	4:40
9.	"Butane (Champion's Anthem)" (featuring El-P)	Render; Meline	3:18
10.	"Anywhere but Here" (featuring Emily Panic)	Render; Meline	3:31
11.	"Willie Burke Sherwood"	Render; Meline; Wilder Zoby	4:23
12.	"R.A.P. Music"	Render; Meline; Zoby	4:26

== Personnel ==
- Bun B – vocals
- Regina Davenport – production coordination
- Jason DeMarco – executive producer
- DJ Abilities – scratching
- El-P – engineer, producer, programming, vocals, composer
- Nicholas Howard – vocals
- Killer Mike – vocals, composer, executive producer
- G.G. McGee – lyric transcription
- Emily Panic – vocals
- Fahamu Pecou – paintings
- Bradley Post – engineer
- Joey Raia – mixing
- Scar – vocals
- Glenn Schick – mastering
- Torbitt Schwartz – guitar
- Shanna Sheets – lyric transcription
- T.I. – vocals
- Trouble – vocals
- Trey Wadsworth – design
- Wilder Zoby – composer, co-producer

== Charts ==
2012 chart performance for R.A.P. Music
Chart (2012)	Peak position
US Billboard 200	82
US Independent Albums (Billboard)	16
US Top R&B/Hip-Hop Albums (Billboard)	12

2022 chart performance for R.A.P. Music
Chart (2022)	Peak position
UK R&B Albums (Official Charts)	21
