= Michael (Killer Mike album) =

Studio album by Killer Mike
- Released: June 16, 2023
- Genre: Southern hip-hop
- Length: 53:44
- Label: VLNS; Loma Vista
- Producer: André 3000; Beat Butcha; James Blake; Don Cannon; Cool & Dre; Cory Mo; DJ Paul; El-P; Honorable C.N.O.T.E.; Little Shalimar; No I.D.; Tec Beatz; Twhy Xclusive; Willy Will Yanez; MenaceTheDJ; J. Rhodes; Julian Cruz; SKUFL; Travagant; Obj Nwadije

Killer Mike chronology
R.A.P. Music (2012)	Michael (2023)	Songs for Sinners & Saints (2024)

Michael (stylized in all caps) is the sixth studio album by American rapper Killer Mike, released through VLNS and Loma Vista Recordings on June 16, 2023. It marks Killer Mike's first solo studio record in 11 years, following 2012's R.A.P. Music, and includes collaborations with CeeLo Green, Mozzy, Young Thug, 6lack, Eryn Allen Kane, Jagged Edge, André 3000, Future, Currensy, 2 Chainz, Kaash Paige, Blxst, Fabo, El-P and Ty Dolla Sign. It received positive critic reviews and won the Grammy Award for Best Rap Album in 2024.

== Background ==
In an interview with Zane Lowe, Killer Mike called the album both his "come home moment musically", due to it being influenced by gospel, soul, funk and hip-hop, and his "submission to God, like, 'Okay, you got me.'" He also characterized it as his way of honoring "the civil rights movement, the abolitionist movement, which gave us some of the most beautiful music ever".

== Critical reception ==
Professional ratings
Aggregate scores
Source	Rating
AnyDecentMusic?	7.6/10
Metacritic	77/100
Review scores
Source	Rating
AllMusic	3.5/5 stars
DIY	4.5/5 stars
Evening Standard	4/5 stars
musicOMH	4.5/5 stars
Pitchfork	6.5/10
Slant Magazine	3.5/5 stars

At Metacritic, which assigns a weighted average score out of 100 to reviews from mainstream critics, Michael received an average score of 77 based on 15 reviews, indicating "generally favorable" reception.

Ed Lawson of DIY called it a "sonically rich record that is likely to reveal yet more on each listen" as "there's something about the vignettes he paints on Michael [...] that suggests that while he's seemed an open book so far, there's still plenty for him to reveal". Rolling Stone's Mosi Reeves felt that "despite the sometimes-overwrought musical backdrop, Killer Mike remains an incisive and compelling lyricist who confidently takes Michael into unexpected places" and that the rapper "focuses on his personal life, particularly his late mother and grandmother, with uncharacteristic empathy and restraint, even as he continues to utilize his uniquely brusque vocal style".

David Smyth of the Evening Standard opined that "here [Killer Mike is] still vivid and passionate on what it means to be a black man today, but now with a more personal slant". Smyth also found there to be "a few more commercial moments, such as what counts nowadays as a rare guest appearance from Outkast's Andre 3000 over the futuristic synths of "Scientists & Engineers", and a skyscraping turn from another Atlanta man, CeeLo Green, on Down by Law. But this is really all about what it's like to be Mike, and it's a fascinating tale". Ben Devlin of musicOMH wrote that the album "delivers virtuosity, emotion and excellence" and that one of its "greatest achievements is that it's such a personal, heartfelt record despite so many other rappers and singers coming along for the ride".

Slant Magazine's Steve Erickson remarked that Michael "emphasizes Killer Mike's Atlanta heritage by harkening back to a style of Southern rap influenced by gospel, soul, and blues" and although most songs "rel[y] on a similar arrangement of choirs, pianos, and organs, which risks becoming tiresome, [...] its sonic divergence from most mainstream American hip-hop today is refreshing". Dylan Green of Pitchfork described the album as "an origin story that works best when it examines how worshiping at the altars of sex, money, and Jesus created the man we know today. But when he petulantly doubles down on critiques of his public persona and status as a Black multi-millionaire, the album is harder to stomach." Reviewing the album for AllMusic, Paul Simpson declared that, "Michael can get overbearing at times" but also noted that, "the production is generally stellar, and it's easily the rapper's most honest and emotional work."

== Track listing ==
Michael track listing
No.	Title	Writer(s)	Producer(s)	Length
1.	"Down by Law" (with CeeLo Green)	Michael Render; Thomas Callaway; Warryn Campbell; Curtis Mayfield; Damien Farmer III; Cory Moore	Cory Mo; Cal A^{[m]}	3:31
2.	"Shed Tears" (with Mozzy)	Render; Campbell; Farmer; Timothy Patterson; Dion Wilson	No I.D.	4:49
3.	"Run" (featuring Young Thug and Dave Chappelle)	Render; Dennis Brown; Campbell; Dave Chappelle; Farmer; Bryan Jones; Jeffrey Williams II; Wilson	No I.D.	4:45
4.	"Nrich" (featuring 6lack and Eryn Allen Kane)	Render; Jones; Eryn Allen Koehn; Andre Lyon; Bruce Smith; Ricardo Valentine Jr.; Marcello Valenzano	Cool & Dre	4:40
5.	"Talk'n That Shit!"	Render; Paul Beauregard; Tim Moore	DJ Paul; Twhy Xclusive	2:54
6.	"Slummer" (with Jagged Edge)	Render; Brian Casey; Lyon; Roger Nichols; Valenzano; Paul Williams	Cool & Dre	4:35
7.	"Scientists & Engineers" (with André 3000 featuring Future and Eryn Allen Kane)	Render; Beuregard; James Blake; André Benjamin; Moore; Wilson	André 3000; DJ Paul; Blake; No I.D.; Twhy Xclusive	4:13
8.	"Two Days" (with Ty Dolla Sign)	Render; Donald Cannon	Don Cannon; Cal A^{[m]}	4:40
9.	"Spaceship Views" (with Currensy, 2 Chainz, and Kaash Paige)	Render; Campbell; Tauheed Epps; Farmer; Shante Franklin; Carlton Mays Jr.; D'Kyla Woolen	Honorable C.N.O.T.E.	3:12
10.	"Exit 9" (with Blxst)	Render; Matthew Burdette; Campbell; Eliot Dubock; Farmer; Will Yanez	Beat Butcha; Willy Will Yanez	2:42
11.	"Something for Junkies" (with Fabo)	Render; Campbell; Cannon; Farmer; Louis Farrakhan; Torbitt Schwartz; Lefabian Williams	Cannon; Little Shalimar; No I.D.	4:38
12.	"Motherless" (with Eryn Allen Kane)	Render; Campbell; Farmer; Koehn; Wilson	No I.D.	3:53
13.	"Don't Let the Devil" (with El-P featuring Thankugoodsir)	Render; Marshall Boxley; Willie Cooper; Harold Lilly; Jaime Meline; Schwartz; Wilson	El-P; Little Shalimar; No I.D.	2:45
14.	"High & Holy" (with Ty Dolla Sign)	Render; Campbell; Farmer; Jones; Brandon Sewell	Tec Beatz	4:53
Total length:				53:44

Deluxe
No.	Title	Writer(s)	Producer(s)	Length
15.	"Yes!"	Render; Jason Cannon; Justin Rhodes; Milton Biggam	MenaceTheDJ; J.Rhodes	2:57
16.	"Maynard Vignette" (with T.I., JID, and Jacquees)	Render; Clifford Harris; Damien Romel Farmer III; Jose Julian De La Cruz; Rodriguez Jacquees Broadnax; Campbell; Widnick Prevalon	Julian Cruz; SKUFL	4:48
17.	"Get Some Money"	Render; Carlton Mays Jr; Damien Romel Farmer III; Campbell	Honorable C.N.O.T.E.	3:41
18.	"Act Up" (with Young Nudy)	Render; Alex Levesque; Bryan Jones; Cory Washington; Kingsley Nwadije; Tristan Robertson; William Anspach	Travagant; Obi Nwadije; "Greasy" Wil Anspach	2:53
Total length:				68:03

Note

- ^{^[m]} signifies a music producer.

== Personnel ==
Musicians

- JID – vocals
- Killer Mike – vocals
- Damien "Dammo" Farmer – bass guitar
- Agape Jerry – guitar
- Warryn Campbell – organ (tracks 1, 3), keyboards (2, 4, 6, 8–10, 12–14)
- CeeLo Green – vocals (1)
- Rico Wade – vocals (1)
- Jason McGee & the Choir – choir (2, 4, 6, 9)
- DJ Cutmaster Swiff – turntables (2, 6, 8, 11, 13)
- Mozzy – vocals (2)
- Fousheé – additional vocals (2, 6)
- Thankugoodsir – additional vocals (2, 6, 8, 9, 14)
- Dave Chappelle – vocals (3)
- Young Thug – vocals (3)
- 6lack – vocals (4)
- Eryn Allen Kane – vocals (4, 7, 12), additional vocals (6, 9)
- DJ Paul – additional vocals (5)
- Jagged Edge – additional vocals (6)
- André 3000 – vocals (7)
- Future – vocals (7)
- Ty Dolla Sign – vocals (8, 14)
- 2 Chainz – vocals (9)
- Currensy – vocals (9)
- Kaash Paige – vocals (9)
- Blxst – vocals (10)
- Fabo – vocals (11)
- El-P – vocals (13)

Technical

- Nicolas De Porcel – mastering
- Migui Maloles – mixing (1, 2, 4, 6, 8–14)
- Derek Ali – mixing (3, 5, 7)
- Cyrus Taghipour – mixing (3, 5, 7)
- Project Passion – engineering
- James A. Kelso Jr. – engineering (1, 2, 4–14)
- Renegade El Rey – recording
- Ken Oriole – engineering (6, 7)
- Brandon Blatz – mixing assistance (1–6, 8–14)
- Sydney Wolfe – engineering assistance

== Charts ==
Chart performance for Michael
Chart (2023)	Peak position
Scottish Albums (OCC)	28
UK Album Downloads (OCC)	25
UK R&B Albums (OCC)	2
US Billboard 200	58
US Independent Albums (Billboard)	23
US Top R&B/Hip-Hop Albums (Billboard)	12
