= Scientists & Engineers =

2023 promotional single by Killer Mike

Promotional single by Killer Mike and André 3000 featuring Future, Eryn Allen Kane, and James Blake

from the album Michael
- Released: June 13, 2023
- Recorded: 2021
- Genre: Hip hop
- Length: 4:13
- Label: VLNS; Loma Vista; Concord
- Songwriters: Paul Beauregard; André Benjamin; James Blake; Tim Moore; Michael Render; Dion Wilson
- Producers: André 3000; DJ Paul; James Blake; No I.D.; Twhy Xclusive

Audio
- "Scientists & Engineers" on YouTube

"Scientists & Engineers" is a hip hop song by the American rappers Killer Mike and André 3000 featuring fellow American rapper Future and Eryn Allen Kane. It was released through VLNS and Loma Vista Recordings on June 13, 2023, as Killer Mike's fifth promotional single for his sixth studio album Michael (2023). It won two Grammy awards.

== Background and release ==
Killer Mike told Complex in an interview that a day after calling André 3000 to listen to Michael, not expecting him to accept making a verse due to him declining to do so for ten years, he said he would "bring something back to play the next day". No I.D. called the circumstance lucky and happy, saying when he realized Benjamin and James Blake were now joining "Scientists & Engineers" that "it was gonna take a village". According to Killer Mike, one week before "Life of the Party" (2021) by Kanye West featuring André 3000 released, Benjamin contemplated removing his verse from "Scientists & Engineers". Killer Mike said that once he sent him the final version with Eryn Allen Kane's chorus, Benjamin agreed to keep the verse.

The song was first previewed at a listening party in New York on April 17, 2023. On release, Benjamin's guest verse became his first since "Life of the Party" in 2021 and his first collaboration with Future since the latter's song "Benz Friends" in 2014. All three rappers were also formerly part of the musical collective Dungeon Family.

== Composition ==
According to Thomas Galindo of American Songwriter, André 3000's opening verse has themes of technology and the future of humanity, with Tom Breihan of Stereogum calling his flow "halting" and "darting" and noting his lyrical proficiency. Future raps next, with the latter critic noting his verse's contrasting "melodic-mutter style". Killer Mike's following verse is about "his ongoing hustle" according to Kyle Eustice of AllHipHop.

The refrains are performed by a choir and Eryn Allen Kane. Jon Blistein of Rolling Stone stated that the production has "hypnotic synths" that lead into "soulful guitars". Aaron Williams of Uproxx called the instrumental "gospel and funk-inflected" and "straight from the late-90s Atlanta breakout".

== Critical reception ==
Aaron Williams of Uproxx opined that all three rappers had "some of their hardest verses in a long time". Mike Fugere of HotNewHitHop called the song "a homecoming of sorts" due to Killer Mike's debut being a feature on Stankonia (2000) by the duo Outkast of which Benjamin was one half of, saying it was "a celebration of two kids from Atlanta continuously making great music".

"Scientists & Engineers" won the award for Best Rap Performance and Best Rap Song at the 66th Annual Grammy Awards and was ranked as 2023's best rap song by HotNewHipHop. (Note: Shortly before the 2023 Grammy award for Best Rap Song had been officially given out, the award had erroneously been announced and listed on their website as being won by Nicki Minaj and Ice Spice for their song "Barbie World". It would have been the former's first Grammy win.) BET nominated it in the category of Impact Track at their 2023 awards show, also nominating André 3000's performance for Sweet 16: Best Featured Verse. His rapping was also awarded Best Rap Verse of 2023 by HipHopDX and listed as the year's second-best rap verse by Complex.

== Charts ==
Chart (2023)	Peak position
New Zealand (Official New Zealand Music Chart)	39
