= Headphones (Lecrae, Killer Mike, and T.I. song) =

2025 promotional single by Lecrae

Promotional single by Lecrae, Killer Mike, and T.I.

from the album Reconstruction
- Released: August 20, 2025
- Length: 3:42
- Label: Reach
- Songwriters: BongoByTheWay; Clifford Harris; Lecrae Moore; Michael Render; Tyshane Thompson; William Roderick Miller
- Producer: BongoByTheWay

Music video
- "Headphones" on YouTube

"Headphones" is a song by American rappers Lecrae, Killer Mike, and T.I.. The song was released as a promotional single on August 20, 2025 via Reach Records from the former's tenth studio album Reconstruction. It was written by the rappers alongside Beam, William Roderick Miller, and producer BongoByTheWay.

== Writing and composition ==
"Headphones" uses the background of a "somber-yet-smooth beat". The lyrics speak on "grief and survivor’s guilt". They were inspired by the death of Lecrae's cousin, who overdosed on fentanyl, which he referenced to be "the deepest form of grief" he had experienced. The song speaks on the topic that "loss spares no one, believer or not". Lecrae, Killer Mike, and T.I. each perform a verse of the song, in which they speak about friends and family of theirs that have died. The song's chorus states:

And my brother got headphones in heaven, I hope he hears this song

And my momma got headphones in heaven, I hope she hears this song

== Recording and production ==
"Headphones" was produced by BongoByTheWay. Connor Back and Jacob "Biz" Morris engineered, mixed, and mastered the song.

== Release and promotion ==
In July 2025, "Headphones" was previewed alongside several tracks from Reconstruction at City Takers Church in Atlanta, Georgia. The song was released to Christian radio in the United States on August 20, 2025, on August 21 to digital download and streaming formats, and on August 22, to CD and LP formats with the release of Reconstruction.

On September 4, 2025, an official music video was released for the song. The video depicts Lecrae looking through vinyl records from late rappers such as Tupac Shakur, Nipsey Hussle, and Takeoff, while Killer Mike looks through a photo album featuring pictures of his family. T.I. appears later in the video.

== Reception ==
=== Critical ===
Michael Carder of Jesus Freak Hideout regarded "Headphones" as one of the best songs from Reconstruction, stating that it is "easily top five" and he sees it "staying in heavy rotation for a lot of listeners". He compared it to having a similar sound as the album's lead single, "Still Here", noticing that they both contain a "catchy hook and a smooth beat". He observed that "Headphones" is "a beautifully written tribute to those who've passed".

Speaking for Shatter the Standards, Murffey Zavier named "Headphones" as one of his three favorite songs on album, alongside "Tell No Lie" and "Brick for Brick". Timothy Yap of Jubilee Cast labelled the song as a highlight from the album.

=== Commercial ===
With Reconstruction's chart debut on September 6, 2025, "Headphones" opened with its peak position of No. 31 on the Billboard Hot Christian Songs chart. It remained on the chart for one week.

=== Accolades ===
At the 2026 Grammy Awards, "Headphones" was nominated for the award of Best Contemporary Christian Music Performance/Song.

Year	Organization	Category	Result	Ref.
2026	Grammy Awards	Best Contemporary Christian Music Performance/Song	Nominated	
2026	BET Awards	Dr. Bobby Jones Best Gospel/Inspirational Award	Won	
2026	Stellar Awards	Rap/Hip Hop Song of the Year	Nominated	

Year-end lists
Publication	Accolade	Rank	Ref.
Jesus Freak Hideout	Michael Carder's Song Picks	9	

== Personnel ==
Credits adapted from Tidal Music.

- BongoByTheWay – producer, writer
- Clifford Harris – writer
- Connor Back – engineer, masterer, mixer
- Jacob "Biz" Morris – engineer, masterer, mixer
- Lecrae Moore – writer
- Michael Render – writer
- Tyshane Thompson – writer
- William Roderick Miller – writer

== Charts ==
Weekly chart performance for "Headphones"
Chart (2025)	Peak position
US Hot Christian Songs (Billboard)	31

== Release history ==
Release history and formats for "Headphones"
Region	Date	Release	Format(s)	Label(s)	Ref.
United	August 20, 2025	Non-album single	Christian radio	Reach Records	
Various	August 21, 2025	Non-album single	Digital download; streaming	Reach Records	
Various	August 22, 2025	Reconstruction	CD; LP; digital download; streaming	Reach Records	
