= Pledge (album) =

Studio album by Killer Mike
- Released: May 17, 2011
- Recorded: 2010–2011
- Studio: Hit Factory Music (New York City); Criteria Studios (Miami)
- Genre: Hip-hop; Southern hip-hop
- Length: 56:38
- Label: Grind Time; Grand Hustle; Tree Leaf; SMC; Fontana
- Producer: DJ Speedy; Flying Lotus; No I.D.; Raz (Beat Billionaire); Smiff & Cash; Sweatbox Productions; Tha Bizness; The Beat Bullies; Zone Beats

Killer Mike chronology
I Pledge Allegiance to the Grind II (2008)	Pledge (2011)	R.A.P. Music (2012)

Singles from Pledge
- 1. "Ready Set Go" Released: December 7, 2010

Pledge (stylized as PL3DGE) is the fourth studio album by American hip-hop recording artist Killer Mike. It was released on May 17, 2011, through SMC Recordings, Grind Time Official, Tree Leaf Records and Grand Hustle Records. The album's production was handled by Tha Bizness, No I.D., Flying Lotus, The Beat Bullies, DJ Speedy, Raz of the Beat Billionaire and Grind Time label-mates Smiff & Cash. The album, which is his third in the I Pledge Allegiance to the Grind series, was supported by the lead single "Ready Set Go", featuring Grand Hustle label-boss and fellow American rapper T.I.

== Background ==
Killer Mike had started his recordings for Pledge in mid-2010 and throughout the beginning of 2011. He announced the first recording from the album, entitled "Ready Set Go" with production by No I.D., in late 2010. The album is the third in a series that started with I Pledge Allegiance to the Grind in 2006, and was followed by I Pledge Allegiance to the Grind II in 2008.

== Music ==
=== Lyrical style ===
During an interview for HipHopDX, Mike commented on the political trend of the album saying:

Yeah, I got concerns that they’re gonna kill me. I’ve got concerns that unless enough people wake up and pay attention to what I’m saying, either I’m going to have to stop saying it or I’m going to get killed for saying it—one or the other. When I say “they,” [that’s] anybody who has those three letters in their title. Usually it’s an alphabet boy or some type saying, “I’m the GFI—Governmental Federal Investigators.” But I do have fears of dying young based on the things I say. I say things that Jesus, Dr. King, Malcolm X and Che Guevara said. I also say stuff that Fred Hampton, Alprentice Carter and Huey Newton said.

— Killer Mike

=== Controversy with Jay-Z and Warren Buffett ===
Mike also talks to HipHopDX about Jay-Z and Warren Buffett contents on album, saying:

It wasn’t so much about Jay-Z next to Warren Buffett any more than it was about Ronald Reagan being a bad actor—when I said that in the third verse. What it was about was, in this country, we’re given idols to worship. I’ve loved Jay-Z as a rapper since ’96 when I was knee-deep in the trap. But I will never allow media to fool me to somehow think that just because a black kid from Marcy Projects becomes a billionaire the tables are fair when he’s standing next to a man who’s worth $56 billion.

Warren Buffett can give away his money, and the next year make more money and plus $10 billion. Jay-Z has had to fight, bleed, kill and die for every dollar he’s ever got. And that’s not to say that Mr. Buffett and every other billionaire doesn’t. That’s just saying that I can choose to give Jay-Z another dollar. I can choose to buy his record; I can choose to go to his restaurant. Warren Buffett owns a piece of everything I have—whether it’s orange juice, Polar Springs or the table we’re at. Berkshire Hathaway owns a piece of it! My thing is, if I allow you to start making Jay-Z equal to that in the perception and minds of people, I start judging Jay-Z by those standards. And that’s not fair. He can’t do—socially and globally—what someone with $50 billion can do. It’s wrong to put those expectations on him.

So I view Jay-Z and Puffy as entertaining businessmen who have made moguls out of themselves. In the context of putting their money next to me, I shrink. But putting their money next to Buffett, Carlos Slim out of Mexico, the Nigerian and East Indian billionaires, they just become regular people again. I won’t let my perception to be controlled. So it’s not a slight against Jay-Z. It’s just saying that if you allow you idols to be judged on a game or playing field that they didn’t create, you’re gonna be saying you think they’re in the Illuminati. And they’re not, because they don’t have enough money to be in the Illuminati.

— Killer Mike

== Singles ==
Killer Mike released one single for the album. The song, titled "Ready Set Go", was released December 7, 2010 for digital download. The song was produced by No I.D., and features vocals from T.I. "Ready Set Go" failed to chart.

== Reception ==
Professional ratings
Review scores
Source	Rating
AllMusic	4/5 stars
Bonafide	(favorable)
Pitchfork	8.0/10
The Smoking Section	4/5 stars
Spin	7/10

The album received favorable reviews overall, with Mosi Reeves of Spin giving the album a 7 out of 10, stating, "The former OutKast associate tones down the crack talk in favor of diatribes against Sarah Palin and Nancy Pelosi ("That's Life II") and the Christian church." The website Bonafide also rated the album as positive, with David Acaster introducing the album saying, "Fortunately he hasn’t taken the route of most New York rappers and declare it the death of hip-hop, an achingly boring tactic that never hides the fact that it’s bitter resentment. Instead it’s just served to make him hungry, and for large parts of Pl3dge he finds his own lane, standing above his peers from his illustrious hometown."

== Track listing ==
Pledge track listing
No.	Title	Writer(s)	Producer(s)	Length
1.	"So Glorious"	Michael Render	Smiff & Cash	3:43
2.	"That's Life II"	Render	Smiff & Cash	3:47
3.	"Ric Flair"	Render	Sweatbox Productions	3:37
4.	"Ready Set Go" (featuring T.I.)	Render; Clifford Harris, Jr.; Dion Wilson	No I.D.	3:42
5.	"Burn" (featuring Funkadelic)	Render	Sweatbox Productions	4:16
6.	"Go Out on the Town" (featuring Young Jeezy)	Render; Jay Jenkins	Raz (of Beat Billionaire)	5:06
7.	"God in the Building II"	Render	The Beat Bullies	4:33
8.	"Players Lullaby" (featuring Roc D the Legend and Twista)	Render	Tha Bizness	4:06
9.	"Animal" (featuring Gucci Mane)	Render	Zone Beatz	3:58
10.	"American Dream Prelude"	Render	Sweatbox Productions	1:08
11.	"American Dream"	Render	Sweatbox Productions	2:13
12.	"Everything (Hold You Down)"	Render	Sweatbox Productions	3:08
13.	"Follow Your Dreams"	Render	DJ Speedy	4:29
14.	"Swimming" (featuring Roc D the Legend)	Render	Flying Lotus	4:01
15.	"Ready Set Go (Remix)" (featuring T.I. and Big Boi)	Render; Antwan Patton; Harris, Jr.; Wilson	No I.D.	4:51
Total length:				56:38

== Charts ==
Chart performance for Pledge
Chart (2011)	Peak position
US Billboard 200	115
US Independent Albums (Billboard)	20
US Top R&B/Hip-Hop Albums (Billboard)	23
