= A.D.I.D.A.S. (Killer Mike song) =

Single by Big Boi, Killer Mike, Sleepy Brown

Single by Killer Mike featuring Big Boi and Sleepy Brown

from the album Monster
- Released: July 8, 2003
- Recorded: 2003
- Genre: Hip hop
- Length: 4:23
- Label: Columbia
- Songwriters: Michael Render, Antwan Patton, David Sheats
- Producer: Mr. DJ

Killer Mike singles chronology
"Never Scared" (2003)	"A.D.I.D.A.S." (2003)	"Imma Fool Wit It" (2009)

Big Boi singles chronology
"In da Wind" (2002)	"A.D.I.D.A.S." (2003)	"Girlfight" (2005)

Sleepy Brown singles chronology
"Land of a Million Drums" (2002)	"A.D.I.D.A.S." (2003)	"The Way You Move" (2003)

"A.D.I.D.A.S." is a song by American rapper Killer Mike, released as the second single from his debut studio album Monster (2003). The song features guest appearances from fellow rapper Big Boi and singer Sleepy Brown, and is produced by Mr. DJ, who helped write the song along with the two rappers. The lead hook that continues throughout the song is sampled from the Ween song "Roses are Free", from their 1994 album Chocolate and Cheese.

== Critical reception ==
"A.D.I.D.A.S." received generally positive reviews from music critics. Allmusic writer John Bush called the song "irresistible", selecting it as one of the best songs from Monster along with "Rap Is Dead" and "U Know I Love U". Writing for the hip-hop website RapReviews, writer Steve Juon complimented "A.D.I.D.A.S." and the way it addressed the sexual theme of its title, describing it as a "light-hearted song about getting a nut". Uncut magazine described the song's tempo "bouncing" and praised how the song displays Killer Mike's "playful pop sensibilities".

== Payola controversy ==
In 2005, as Sony BMG Music Entertainment was settling with New York State after an investigation revealed various radio payoff schemes, or payola, originally banned in the 1960s, Killer Mike's song "A.D.I.D.A.S." was implicated and used as evidence against the music company. While Killer Mike was not involved in the scheme, The New York Times reported that, "a Sony BMG executive considered a plan to promote the song 'A.D.I.D.A.S.' by Killer Mike by sending radio disc jockeys one Adidas sneaker, with the promise of the second one when they had played the song 10 times." Likewise, The Washington Post reported that in a 2002 memo by one of the company's executives, "the company proposed to approach DJs whose stations let them select their own music, ask them for their shoe size and send them each one Adidas sneaker. If a DJ could then show that he had spun the song on the air at least 10 times, he'd get the other shoe in the pair, autographed by the artist."

== Track listing ==
US CD single

1. "A.D.I.D.A.S." (featuring Big Boi and Sleepy Brown) – 3:33
2. "Rap Is Dead" – 3:26

US digital download

1. "A.D.I.D.A.S." (featuring Big Boi and Sleepy Brown) – 3:31
2. "Rap Is Dead" – 3:25

== Charts ==
Chart (2003)	Peak position
Australia (ARIA)	88
Ireland (IRMA)	45
New Zealand (Recorded Music NZ)	36
Scotland Singles (Official Charts)	23
UK Singles (Official Charts)	22
UK Hip Hop/R&B (Official Charts)	7
US Billboard Hot 100	60
US Hot R&B/Hip-Hop Songs (Billboard)	42
US Hot Rap Songs (Billboard)	20
US Rhythmic Airplay (Billboard)	14

== Release history ==
Country	Date	Format	Label
United States	February 3, 2003	Rhythmic contemporary · urban contemporary radio	Aquemini, Columbia
United States	July 8, 2003	CD single	Aquemini, Columbia
United States	July 8, 2003	Digital download	Aquemini, Columbia
