= SL Jones =

American rapper from Arkansas

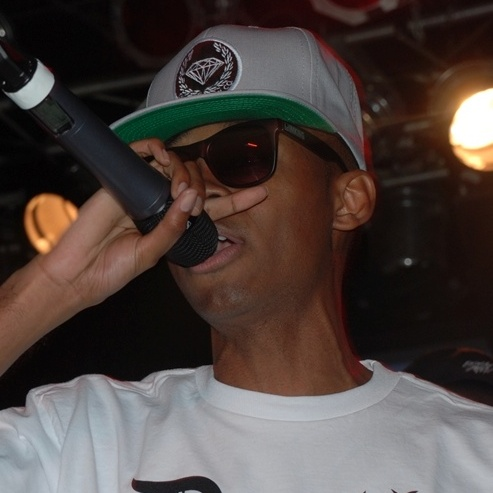
- Jones in concert at A3C in 2011

Background information
- Also known as: Cuz Lightyear
- Born: Bryan Charles Jones; Flint, Michigan, United States
- Origin: Little Rock, Arkansas, United States
- Genre: Hip hop
- Occupations: Rapper; songwriter
- Years active: 2009–present
- Labels: Outta Pocket; INgrooves
- Website: http://www.sljonesmusic.com

Bryan Charles "SL" Jones, also known as Cuz Lightyear, is an American rapper and songwriter.

== Early life ==
Jones was born in Flint, Michigan, and shortly after moved with his family to Little Rock, Arkansas, where he was raised in a neighborhood known as 23rd & Wolfe Street. He described his neighborhood as being in a gang-heavy part of the city, a collection of smaller Crip and Blood affiliated neighborhoods. He regularly raps about and references his hometown and neighborhood, with the number 23, taken from the street's name, serving as a recurring theme in his music. While growing up, Jones spent a brief time back in Flint, where he was pursuing studies in visual arts, before ultimately moving to Atlanta to pursue a career in music. Upon beginning his career in music, the name SL Jones was selected with SL representing the words "Second Letter", as in the letter B (for Bryan), the second letter of the alphabet.

== Career ==
=== Grind Time Rap Gang ===
Jones first gained awareness when he began working with Killer Mike, Pill, Nario, Big Slimm, Da Bill Collector, and others as a part of Grind Time Official, also referred to as Grind Time Rap Gang. While working closely with Grind Time, SL Jones appeared on a number of mixtapes and official retail albums, including I Pledge Allegiance To The Grind and Underground Atlanta.

=== Solo career ===
In 2009, SL Jones released his first solo mixtape C.O.L.O.R.S.: Bangin' On Wax. The mixtape included features from Killer Mike, Trae Tha Truth, Clipse, Chamillionaire, and more. Upon release, the project earned SL Jones accolades from a variety of press outlets, including Complex Magazine, which named SL Jones as one of The 10 Most Underrated New Rappers, writing: "With an analytical Mind and lyrical dexterity to go with impeccable flows and harmonies, [SL Jones] brings a complexity that's rare for both Southern and gang-affiliated rap."

In 2011, SL Jones released four projects. On May 23, SL Jones released the Don Cannon-hosted mixtape The Number 23, a project which included features from Killer Mike, Pill, Trae Tha Truth, Waka Flocka Flame, and Yo Gotti, along with production from various producers, most notably: Lex Luger, Shawty Redd, Don Cannon, and Smiff & Cash. The mixtape received positive feedback, with XXL Magazine awarding the project an L-rated review, while Atlanta's leading alternative weekly, Creative Loafing gave the project a 4/5.

On August 23, 2011, The Number 23 was re-released in a slimmed down, non-DJ format titled The Number 23: Editor's Cut. This version, with a total of 16 songs, included two new tracks: "Out Here", which features Rocko and JBar, and "Michael Jordan", produced by Lex Luger.

On September 14, 2011, SL Jones released Pandamonium, a project that remixed Clams Casino's Rainforest EP. The project contained five tracks.

On December 14, 2011, SL Jones released a mixtape, Flight Risk. The 10-track project included production by several producers, including Sonny Digital, Young L, Lex Luger, and Shawty Redd. XXL writes, "...the tape is another dosage of quality material from SL. Streets approved, no questions."

In 2012, SL Jones announced his intention to release a series of EP projects; instead he began working to complete a 12-track mixtape with Atlanta producer DJ Burn One for the first five months of the year. In February 2012, SL Jones announced the collaborative project, titled Paraphernalia. In concert with the announcement, SL Jones released “Wave Runner,” a song produced by DJ Burn One that ultimately was not included on the mixtape. On May 23, SL Jones released Paraphernalia, which includes features from rappers Freddie Gibbs and Rittz and singer Ebony Love.

Critical response to Paraphernalia was positive. Complex Magazine hailed the mixtape as "an expertly crafted piece of Southern-fried hip-hop." FADER Magazine wrote, "Paraphernalia boasts variety, songcraft and attention to detail, a tough trifecta to find." RCRD LBL wrote, "Paraphernalia is like spending the day at a barbecue. There's soulful lyricism and the sort of stoned throwback organic funk at which Burn One excels." The Smoking Section wrote, "My best advice is not to sleep on Paraphernalia."

In 2013, SL Jones announced a new EP, Trapper's Delight, produced by M16. The EP included seven songs and earned strong marks from outlets like Complex, XXL, and others. In April, SL Jones went out on his first headline tour, "The Way Of Life No Hobby Tour", to support Trapper's Delight and prepare for his new mixtape. The nine-city tour made stops in states including Louisiana, Texas, Oklahoma, and Arkansas.

In August 2013, SL Jones announced a new mixtape, Way Of Life No Hobby, hosted by popular mixtape DJ and record executive Don Cannon. The mixtape was preceded by three singles, "Big Bank (No Ones)", "America's Nightmare", and "Don't Want Nan". Like Trapper's Delight and Paraphernalia, SL Jones collaborated exclusively with one producer, Metro Boomin, for Way Of Life No Hobby. The mixtape was released on September 4, 2013, via popular mixtape website LiveMixtapes and includes features from Killer Mike, Kevin Gates, Starlito, Trouble, Mibbs of the rap group Pac Div, and others.

== Discography ==
=== Mixtapes ===
- C.O.L.O.R.S.: Bangin' On Wax (2009)
- The Number 23 (2011)
- The Number 23: Editor's Cut (2011)
- Flight Risk (2011)
- Paraphernalia (2012)
- Trapper's Delight (2013)
- Way Of Life No Hobby (2013)

=== Remix Projects ===
- Pandamonium (Rainforest Remixes) (2011)

=== Guest appearances ===
- I Pledge Allegiance to the Grind (2006)
- Underground Atlanta (2009)
- Rubble Kings Soundtrack (2016)
