= Killer Mike =

American rapper and activist (born 1975)

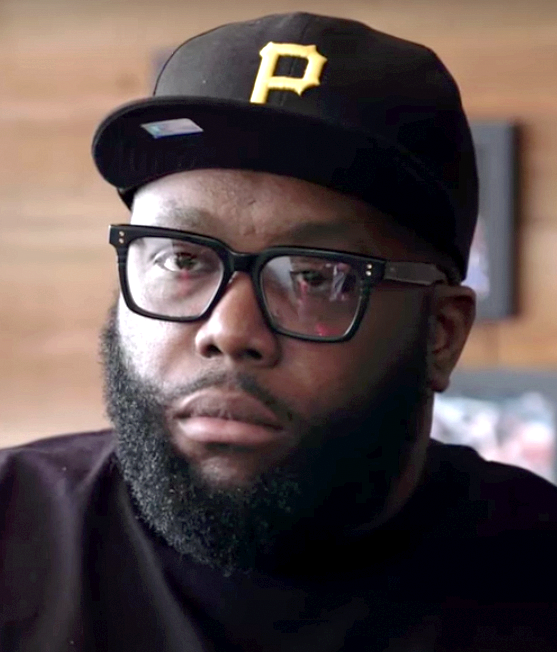
- Killer Mike in 2017

Background information
- Also known as: Mike Bigga; Jerome Jewel
- Born: Michael Santiago Render; April 20, 1975 (age 51); Atlanta, Georgia, U.S.
- Genres: Southern hip-hop, gospel
- Occupations: Rapper; singer; songwriter; actor; activist
- Works: Killer Mike discography
- Years active: 1995–present
- Labels: Loma Vista; Mass Appeal; Grind Time; Fontana; SMC; Grand Hustle; Atlantic; Williams Street; Fool's Gold; Purple Ribbon; Columbia
- Member of: Run the Jewels; Dungeon Family; Michael & the Mighty Midnight Revival
- Formerly of: Purple Ribbon All-Stars
- Children: 4
- Website: killermike.com

Michael Santiago Render (born April 20, 1975), known professionally as Killer Mike, is an American rapper, singer, actor, and activist. He made his recording debut on Outkast's fourth album Stankonia (2000), and guest appeared on the duo's Grammy Award-winning single "The Whole World" from their greatest hits album Big Boi and Dre Present... Outkast (2001). He signed with Big Boi's Purple Ribbon Records (known then as Aquemini Records) and Columbia Records to release his debut studio album Monster (2003), which was met with critical acclaim and peaked at number ten on the Billboard 200. He parted ways with the label and released two albums—I Pledge Allegiance to the Grind (2006) and I Pledge Allegiance to the Grind II (2008)—before signing with T.I.'s Grand Hustle to release his fourth album, Pledge (2011), and later Williams Street to release his fifth album, R.A.P. Music (2012). His sixth album, Michael (2023), was met with continued acclaim and won three awards at 66th Annual Grammy Awards, including Best Rap Album.

Following R.A.P. Music, which was produced entirely by rapper and producer El-P, he and Render subsequently formed the duo Run the Jewels in 2013. They signed with Fool's Gold Records and released their self-titled debut in June of that year to critical acclaim. Its three sequels—Run the Jewels 2 (2014), Run the Jewels 3 (2016) and RTJ4 (2020)—were each met with continued critical praise, the latter of which matched his debut solo album in chart position on the Billboard 200. The duo made a guest appearance alongside Big Boi on Danger Mouse's 2017 single "Chase Me", which received a Grammy Award nomination.

Outside of music, Render has been a social and political activist, focusing on subjects including social inequality, police brutality, and systemic racism. In addition to discussing related topics in his music, he has lectured about similar issues at colleges and universities, written about such matters for publications including Billboard, and been the subject of interviews regarding police misconduct and race relations. He was a visible and vocal supporter of Bernie Sanders' 2016 U.S. presidential campaign, and supported Sanders once more in his 2020 presidential campaign. Render has appeared in films such as Idlewild, Baby Driver, ATL, and America: The Motion Picture. His six episode docu-series, Trigger Warning with Killer Mike, investigated social issues that affect Black Americans, and premiered on Netflix in January 2019. His weekly interview program for the Public Broadcasting Service (PBS), Love & Respect (2021–present), won an Emmy Award in 2022.

== Early life ==
Michael Render was born in the Adamsville neighborhood of Atlanta, Georgia, on April 20, 1975, the son of a policeman father and a florist mother. Because his parents were teenagers at the time of his birth, he was partly raised by his grandparents in the Collier Heights neighborhood of Atlanta, and attended Douglass High School.

== Career ==
=== 1995–2005: Early career ===
In 1995, Render briefly attended Atlanta's Morehouse College, where he met producers The Beat Bullies, and soon met rapper Big Boi of Outkast. His music debut was a feature appearance on Outkast's "Snappin' & Trappin'" from the 2000 album Stankonia, followed by their 2001 single "The Whole World", which won the 2002 Grammy Award for Best Rap Performance by a Duo or Group. He was featured on several other tracks that year, including the Jay-Z's song "Poppin' Tags" from his album The Blueprint 2, where he guest performed alongside both Big Boi and Chicago rapper Twista.

In 2003, Render released his debut studio album, Monster, while being managed by Dayo Adebiyi and Al Thrash of Own Music. The album's lead single, "Akshon (Yeah!)", featured both Outkast members as guest performers. A remix of the song was included on the soundtrack of EA Sports video game Madden NFL 2004. The album's second single was "A.D.I.D.A.S"., featuring Big Boi and Sleepy Brown, which peaked at number 60 on the US Billboard Hot 100. It remains Render's only single to enter the chart as a lead artist.

Following the release of his own material, he appeared on "Flip Flop Rock" and "Bust" on the Speakerboxx half of OutKast's Speakerboxxx/The Love Below double album. He appeared on "Southern Takeover" with Pastor Troy on Chamillionaire's album The Sound of Revenge. Render appeared alongside T.I. on the song "Never Scared" by Bone Crusher on his album AttenCHUN!. It peaked at #26 on the Hot 100, becoming Mike's second top 40 hit ("The Whole World" being the first). The song was used on the Madden NFL 2004 game soundtrack and by the Atlanta Braves for their 2003 season.

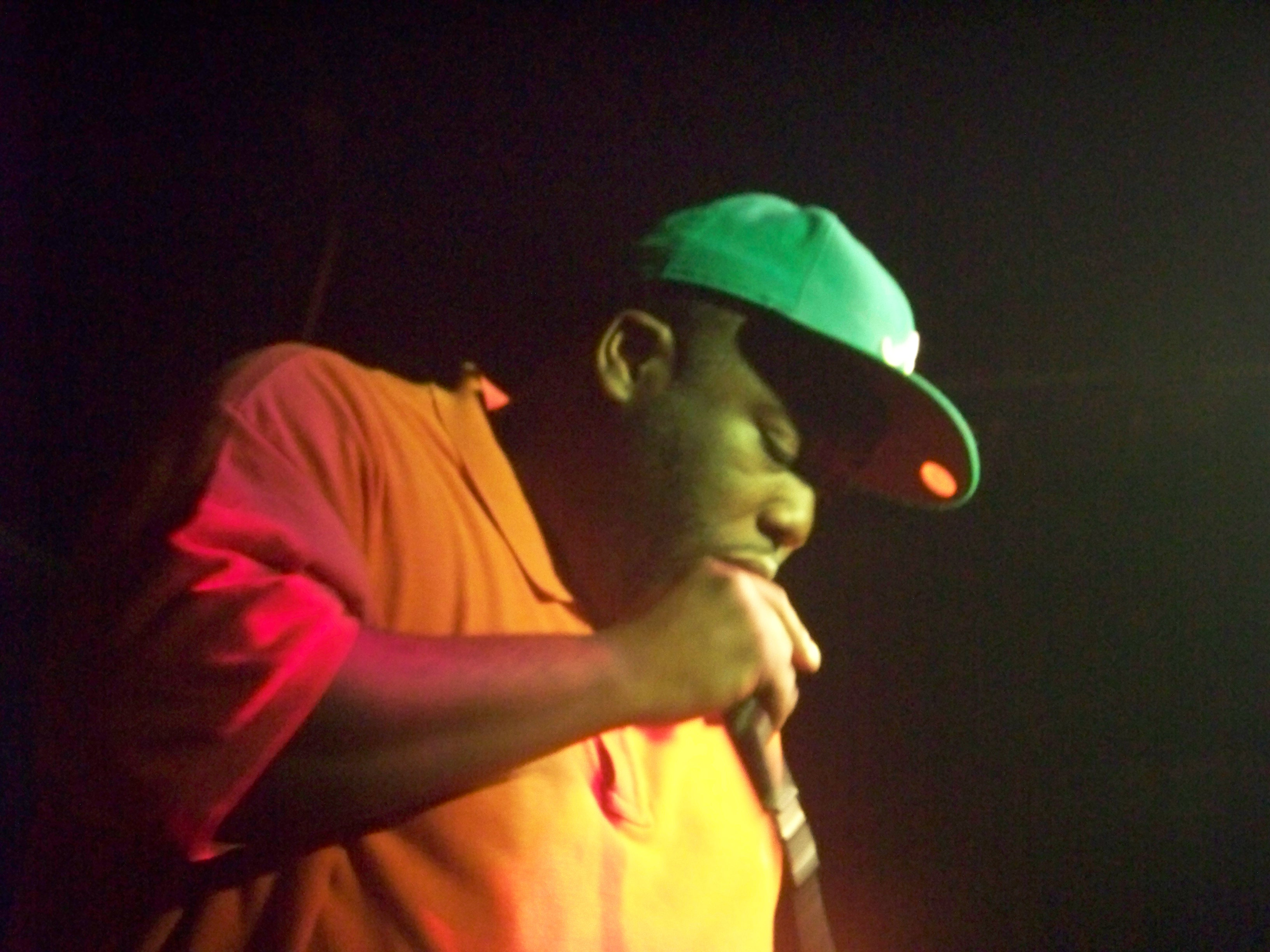
Render performing in May 2008

=== 2006–2012: Pledge series and R.A.P. Music ===
What was to be his second album, Ghetto Extraordinary, had its release date pushed back several times due to disputes between Big Boi and Sony Music. Originally recorded in 2005, the album was eventually self-released as a mixtape in 2008. Render confirmed in January 2008 that he had officially left Purple Ribbon Records.

Render's second album, I Pledge Allegiance to the Grind, was released on his own Grind Time Official label in 2006, followed by I Pledge Allegiance to the Grind II in 2008.

T.I. announced that he and Render had been in talks about bringing Mike to his Grand Hustle imprint on Atlantic, and Render confirmed that he had signed in December 2008. He released his fourth album, PL3DGE, on Grand Hustle in 2011. His fifth album, R.A.P. Music, followed in 2012.

In 2013, Render announced that he was working to release two albums in 2014, I Pledge Allegiance to the Grind IV and R.A.P. Music II, both of which were to feature production by El-P. Although neither album was released as planned, 2013 and 2014 did see the release of two Run the Jewels albums, both collaborative efforts between Render and El-P.

Render announced in 2013 that his next solo album would be titled Elegant Elephant, a project he described as his "Moby Dick". He did not specify a timeline for its release.

=== 2013–present: Run the Jewels, Michael and Songs for Sinners & Saints ===
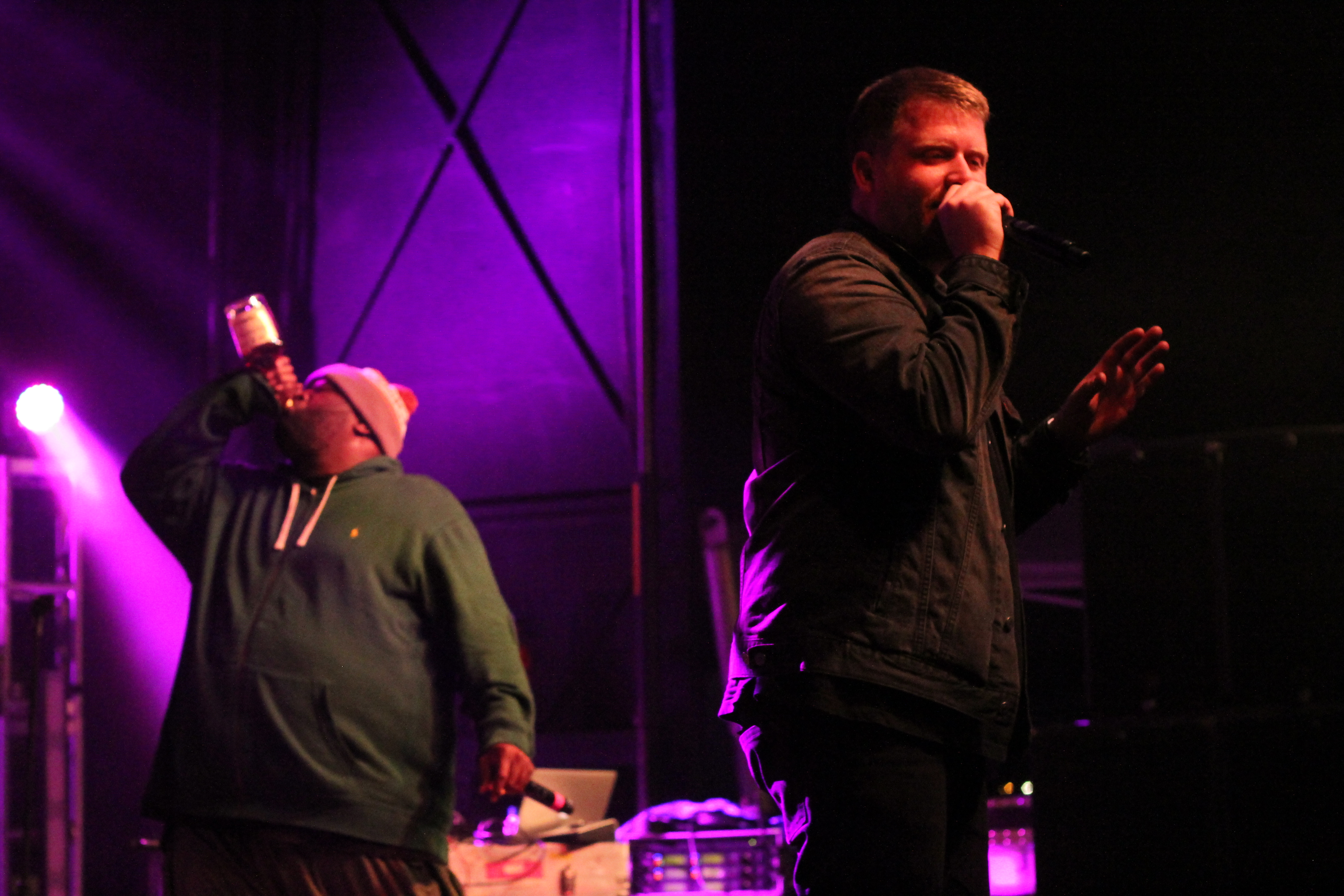
Render (left) and El-P (right) as Run the Jewels at Treefort Music Fest in 2014

Render was introduced to rapper-producer El-P by Cartoon Network executive Jason DeMarco in 2011. The following year, El-P produced Mike's album R.A.P. Music and guested on the song "Butane (Champion's Anthem)". That same year, Render guested on El-P's album Cancer 4 Cure. When R.A.P. Music and Cancer 4 Cure were released within weeks of each other, the two rappers decided to tour together. The success of the tour eventually led to the decision to record as a duo, which they named Run the Jewels.

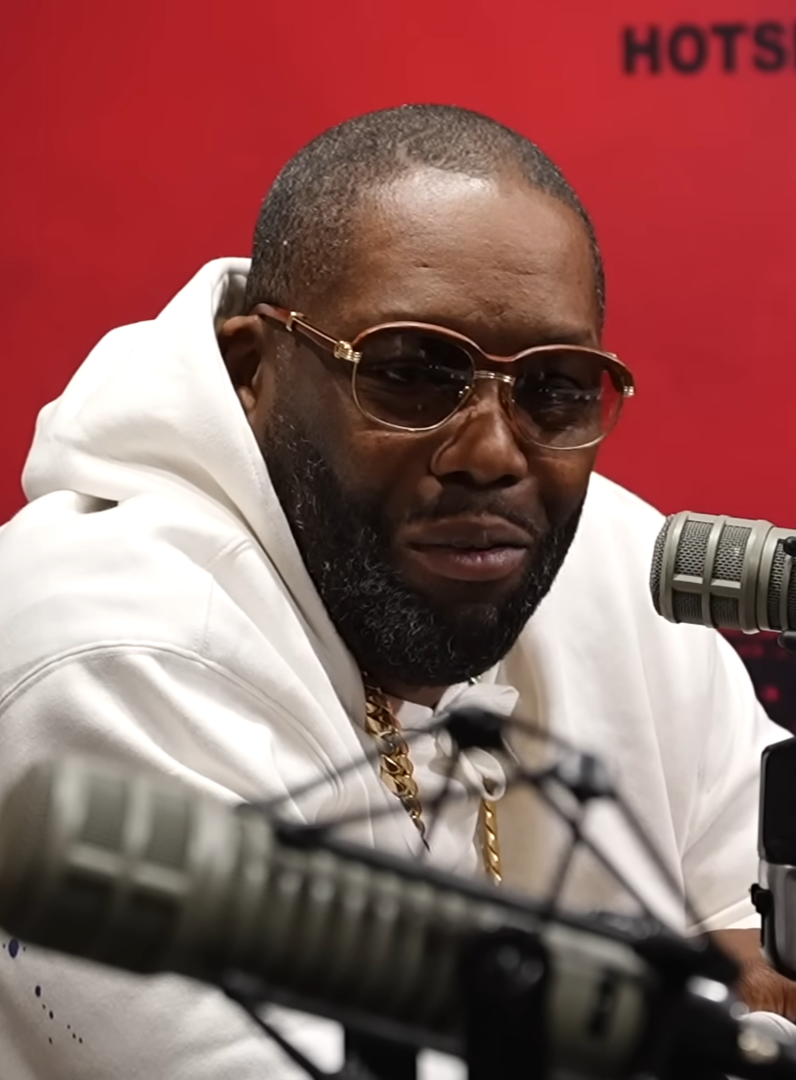
Killer Mike in an interview with WHTA in 2024

Run the Jewels released a free eponymous album on June 26, 2013. The next year, on October 28, 2014, Run the Jewels released their second free album, Run the Jewels 2. On September 25, 2015, the duo released a re-recorded version of Run the Jewels 2 made entirely with cat sounds, titled Meow the Jewels. A third album, Run the Jewels 3, was released on December 24, 2016. Their fourth album, RTJ4, was released on June 3, 2020.

On July 4, 2022, Mike released a solo single, "Run". This track would subsequently appear on Michael, a solo album that Mike released on June 16, 2023. On July 29, 2024, Mike announced his seventh studio album, Songs for Sinners & Saints, with his gospel group, Michael & The Mighty Midnight Revival. The album released August 2nd.

In 2025, Killer Mike appeared on the De La Soul album Cabin in the Sky, on the song “A Quick 16 For Mama”.

== Other ventures ==
=== Acting ===
Mike has been featured in the films 20 Funerals, Idlewild (2006), and ATL (2006). He has performed as a voice actor, playing a rapper/actor-turned-U.S. President named Taqu'il in the Adult Swim cartoon Frisky Dingo from 2006 to 2008. Mike guest-voiced a Boost Mobile phone in an episode of the same name of Adult Swim's Aqua Teen Hunger Force. He appeared twice on an Adult Swim surreal comedy series The Eric Andre Show, once in 2012, where he acted as a hype man for a female opera singer, and again in 2014, where he performed a rap battle with Action Bronson while the two were forced to walk on treadmills. He appeared as himself in Ozark (season 4 episode 8). On January 18, 2019, Netflix released Trigger Warning with Killer Mike, a docuseries which Mike hosts.

=== Graffitis SWAG barbershop ===
Mike and his wife, Shana, opened a barbershop in Atlanta on November 1, 2011. The two acquired and reworked a barbershop and named it Graffitis SWAG (shave, wash, and groom). He had waited nine years before choosing to open the barbershop, after having an early business manager advise him against the plan. It took his wife advising him to do it now while he had the time and money to pursue his lifelong dream. He eventually plans to open 150 shops across the United States over time, predominantly in cities with large Black communities.

The barbershop is decorated with artwork on the walls honoring historic Black leaders, including Martin Luther King Jr. Mike said that he hopes to "lift up men in the community who are out of work and help move them toward sustainable, lifelong careers" and give his employees "opportunity for real economic elevation". As of 2012, the shop employed six barbers, with plans to add four to six more licensed barbers to the team. Mike said that he hoped to pursue his own barber license in the winter of 2012.

The enterprise has been successful and the shop has become a gathering place for the community, in addition to hosting events such as a season premiere for The Boondocks and serving as the setting for several music videos. A second location in Tampa, Florida was planned for 2014.

=== Greenwood bank ===
In October 2020, Render, Bounce TV founder Ryan Glover, and former Atlanta mayor Andrew Young founded Greenwood, an online bank targeting "Black and Latinx communities and anyone else who wants to support Black-owned businesses". According to Glover "tens of thousands" of people were on its waitlist for accounts within a day, and on January 26 Greenwood reported 500,000 people were waiting for accounts. The bank was originally expected to open in January 2021, but delayed its opening first to July, and then to the end of 2021, due to "unanticipated high demand".

== Activism ==
Mike is an outspoken social activist focusing on subjects including social equality, police brutality, and systemic racism. His views are reflected in his music, as well as in interviews with the media. As a publicly viewed figure, Mike feels it is his responsibility to represent African-Americans: "I feel I have to be politically active and I have to be a credit to my race". He has been vocal on the subject of police misconduct, his father being a former police officer. His anti-brutality sentiment can be found on the song "Reagan" from his album R.A.P. Music, and the song "Early" on Run the Jewels 2.

In response to the 2014 killing of Michael Brown in Ferguson, Missouri, Mike said:

I'm appalled that regular Americans are apathetic. I'm appalled that people choose to use the word "thug" as a code word for "nigger". I'm appalled at everyday citizens... when will we, as an American constituency, tell our politicians enough's enough? Enough mayors supporting murderous police departments. Enough police chiefs having to give excuses for murderous police officers.

In an op-ed published in Billboard magazine, Render stated that "there is no reason that Mike Brown and also Eric Garner are dead today—except bad policing, excessive force, and the hunt-and-capture-prey mentality many thrill-seeking cops have adapted".

Mike and El-P performed at The Ready Room in St. Louis, Missouri on November 24, 2014, the same night that the Grand Jury verdict was announced stating that Darren Wilson would not be charged with a crime in the shooting of Michael Brown. Mike opened the set, which began about two hours after the announcement was made, with a heartfelt speech. Fan-shot footage of the speech later went viral.

Mike, in an op-ed, defended rap lyrics as freedom of speech. Mike gave a keynote address on free speech, and particularly with respect to the criminalization of rap music (he has a particular interest in championing the expressive rights of artists, and led the way in a successful campaign against the use of lyrics as criminal evidence in California), at the inaugural gala for the Foundation for Individual Rights and Expression in New York City in April 2023.

Commenting on the 2015 Baltimore uprising related to the death of Freddie Gray, Render noted that he understood the frustrations leading to violent demonstrations, but encouraged protesters to use their energy to organize for lasting change. In a Billboard op-ed, Mike stated:

For the people of Baltimore—I don't criticize rioting because I understand it. But after the fires die down: organize, strategize, and mobilize. Like Ferguson, you have an opportunity to start anew. I don't have a solution because whoever's there will have to come up with it. But we need community relations: riots are the language of the unheard.

He made similar points in an interview with the Harvard Political Review: "Baltimore is an opportunity for us to do something different. As society, there's a real opportunity to organize there, and if we do not take full advantage of the opportunity to organize, then the riots truly meant nothing".

Mike has given lectures about race relations in the United States at several American universities, including Northwestern University, New York University and the Massachusetts Institute of Technology. His activism work was featured in a 2019 episode of The Real World: Atlanta.

=== Political involvement ===
Render introduces Bernie Sanders at a November 2015 campaign rally in Atlanta

In June 2015, Mike briefly ran as a write-in candidate to become the representative for Georgia's 55th district in the Georgia House of Representatives. Despite encouraging voters to write in his real name, Michael Render, any votes he received would not have been considered valid due to his failure to previously register as an official candidate in the election. He said his purpose in running was to raise awareness of the special election, and to demonstrate that political outsiders can and should run against established politicians.

Mike announced his support of Democratic U.S. presidential candidate Bernie Sanders in June 2015 after Sanders announced his intention to restore the Voting Rights Act of 1965. After introducing Sanders at a rally held in Atlanta November 23, 2015, Mike spent time recording an interview with the presidential candidate at Mike's barbershop. Mike released his interview with Sanders as a six-part video series the following month. In the following months, he remained an active and vocal supporter of Sanders, delivering speeches at rallies, voicing support in televised interviews and on social media, and traveling with the campaign. Sanders introduced Run the Jewels before their appearance at the 2016 Coachella music festival.

In February 2016, Mike received criticism during his activism for Sanders for quoting American anti-racism and LGBT advocate Jane Elliott regarding Hillary Clinton, which was criticized as misogynistic and mistakenly attributed as being his original phrasing online and in the press. Following Sanders' exit from the race, Mike refused to support Clinton, citing her pro-war record.

Mike has been an advocate for investment in black-owned banks; in July 2016, he called for people to transfer their money to black-owned Atlanta bank Citizens Trust, stating, "We don't have to burn our city down. But what we can do is go to your banks tomorrow. You can go to your bank tomorrow. And you can say, 'Until you as a corporation start to speak on our behalf, I want all my money. And I'm taking all my money to Citizens Trust".

In June 2017, at Glastonbury festival, Mike endorsed Labour Party leader Jeremy Corbyn in the 2017 UK general election.

On March 22, 2018, Mike appeared on NRATV with host Colion Noir defending Black gun ownership. He says it had been filmed a week prior to the March for Our Lives yet released the weekend of the protest. He stated that he told his children that if they participated in the National School Walkout that he would expect them to leave the family home. On March 26, 2018, he posted a video stating that the NRA used his interview out of context, saying he actually supports March for Our Lives while simultaneously advocating for Black gun ownership. During this same video he gave his endorsement for gun ownership alternatives, listing the Socialist Rifle Association by name.

On May 29, 2020, Mike spoke during a press conference with Atlanta mayor Keisha Lance Bottoms in response to the murder of George Floyd and the ensuing protests.

In 2020, Mike supported both Raphael Warnock and Jon Ossoff in the 2020–2021 United States Senate special election in Georgia, both of whom won. He again endorsed Warnock in the 2022 United States Senate election in Georgia, although he interviewed his opponent, Herschel Walker, in May of that year on his Love & Respect series.

On October 3, 2026, Mike appeared at the Power to the People Festival at Merriweather Post Pavilion in Columbia, MD. The festival, which is being put on by Tom Morello, will also feature performances by Morello, Bruce Springsteen, Foo Fighters and many others. The festival is being held in response to President Donald Trump.

== Personal life ==
Mike married his wife, Shana, in 2006. They have four children.

Mike was arrested and booked for misdemeanor battery following an altercation with a security guard on February 4, 2024, shortly after he won three Grammy Awards. He completed a community service requirement, thus avoiding charges.

Mike has five sisters, including LaShunda and Lovie.

== Discography ==
Studio albums

- Monster (2003)
- I Pledge Allegiance to the Grind (2006)
- I Pledge Allegiance to the Grind II (2008)
- Pledge (2011)
- R.A.P. Music (2012)
- Michael (2023)
- Songs for Sinners & Saints (2024, as Michael & The Mighty Midnight Revival)

== Filmography ==
Year(s)	Title	Role	Notes
2005	Aqua Teen Hunger Force	Boost Mobile Phone	
2006	ATL	Himself	
2006–08	Frisky Dingo	Taqu'il	
2012–14	The Eric Andre Show	Himself	
2017	Animals.	Fox 1	
2017	Baby Driver	Restaurant Patron	Cameo
2017	South Park		Special Performance
2018	Trigger Warning with Killer Mike	Host	
2019	Momma Named Me Sheriff	Dr. Um Actually	Episode: "Bald Boyz"
2020	The Good Lord Bird	Clarence	Cameo
2021	America: The Motion Picture	Blacksmith/John Henry	
2022	Ozark	Himself	Cameo
2022	Aqua Teen Forever: Plantasm	Boxy Brown	
2023	Dave	Himself	
2023	Billions	Himself	
2025	The Lowdown	Cyrus Arnold	4 episodes
2026	Idiots	Pastor William Armstrong	

== Awards ==
=== BET Awards ===
Year	Nominee / work	Award	Result
2026	"Headphones" (with Lecrae and T.I.)	Dr. Bobby Jones Best Gospel/Inspirational Award	Won

=== Grammy Awards ===
Year	Nominee / work	Award	Result
2003	"The Whole World" (with Outkast)	Best Rap Performance By a Duo or Group	Won
2018	"Chase Me" (Danger Mouse featuring Run the Jewels & Big Boi)	Best Rap Song	Nominated
2024	"Scientists & Engineers" (featuring André 3000, Future & Eryn Allen Kane)	Best Rap Song	Won
2024	"Scientists & Engineers" (featuring André 3000, Future & Eryn Allen Kane)	Best Rap Performance	Won
2024	Michael	Best Rap Album	Won
2026	"Headphones" (with Lecrae & T.I.)	Best Contemporary Christian Music Performance/Song	Nominated

=== Billboard Awards ===
In 2020, Render was the recipient of the first Billboard Change Maker Award, created to recognize an artist or group that speaks truth to power through their music and celebrity.

=== Stellar Awards ===
Year	Nominee / work	Award	Result
2026	"Headphones" (with Lecrae and T.I.)	Rap/Hip Hop Song of the Year	Pending
