= Outkast discography =

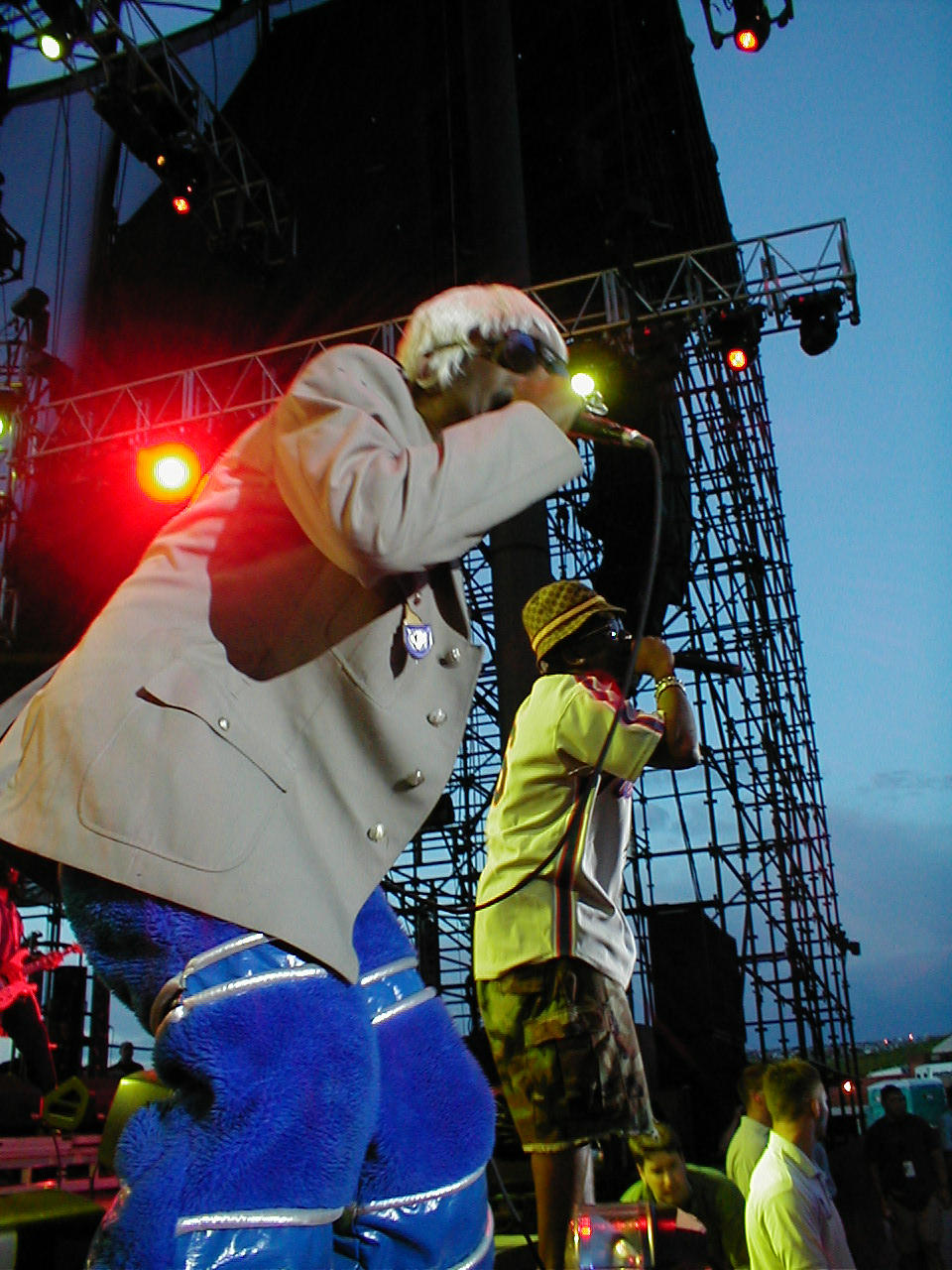
- Outkast at the Area: One music festival in 2001
- Studio albums: 6
- Soundtrack albums: 1
- Compilation albums: 1
- Singles: 24
- Video albums: 1
- Music videos: 23
- Promotional singles: 2

The discography of American hip hop duo Outkast consists of six studio albums (one of which doubles as a soundtrack album), one compilation album, one video album, 24 commercial singles, two promotional singles, and 23 music videos. As featured artists, the duo has appeared on eight commercial singles, four promotional singles, and in seven music videos.

In 1992, Outkast became the first hip hop act to be signed to the label LaFace Records; their debut studio album Southernplayalisticadillacmuzik (1994) debuted at number 20 on the US Billboard 200. Southernplayalisticadillacmuzik spawned the commercially successful single "Player's Ball", which reached number 37 on the US Billboard Hot 100. It was later certified gold by the Recording Industry Association of America (RIAA). Their following two albums, ATLiens (1996) and Aquemini (1998), were commercially successful in the United States; both albums peaked at number two on the Billboard 200, and were certified double-platinum by the RIAA. Three singles were released from each album; all three from ATLiens charted on the Billboard Hot 100, with "Elevators (Me & You)" peaking at number 12, making it the most successful. The lead single from Aquemini, "Rosa Parks", peaked at number 55 on the Billboard Hot 100: two more singles, "Skew It on the Bar-B" and "Da Art of Storytellin' (Pt. 1)", were released from the album. In 1998, Outkast collaborated with hip hop group Goodie Mob on the single "Black Ice (Sky High)" and with rapper Cool Breeze on the single "Watch for the Hook"; the singles peaked at numbers 50 and 73 on the Billboard Hot 100, respectively.

Outkast's fourth studio album Stankonia was their first to achieve success outside the United States; as well as peaking at number two on the Billboard 200, it appeared on the Australian, German and United Kingdom albums charts, along with several others in Europe. Although the lead single "B.O.B" only peaked at number 69 on the US Hot R&B/Hip-Hop Songs chart, the following single "Ms. Jackson" became their first to top the Billboard Hot 100, and peaked in the top ten of many other singles charts. The album's third single "So Fresh, So Clean" peaked at number 30 on the Billboard Hot 100. A compilation album, Big Boi and Dre Present... Outkast, was released in 2001, with "The Whole World" as the album's only single.

In 2003, Outkast released a double album, Speakerboxxx/The Love Below, that became their first album to reach number one on the Billboard 200. It was later certified 11-times-platinum by the RIAA, and was certified double-platinum in the United Kingdom by the British Phonographic Industry (BPI) and in New Zealand by Recorded Music NZ (RMNZ). The lead single, "Hey Ya!", peaked at number one on the Billboard Hot 100 and also topped the Australian and Swedish singles charts. "The Way You Move", a collaboration with singer Sleepy Brown, also topped the Hot 100, and the third single, "Roses", reached the top ten in many territories. "GhettoMusick" and "Prototype" were released as the final two singles from the album. In 2006 Outkast released their sixth studio album, Idlewild, which also served as the soundtrack to the film of the same name. The first single from the album, "Mighty O", peaked at number 77 on the Billboard Hot 100. The second "Morris Brown" was a moderate hit on the charts, the third single only peaked at number 100 and the following two singles "Hollywood Divorce" and "The Train" did not chart. Idlewild was met with lukewarm reviews from music critics and from fans. The album was certified platinum by the RIAA.

== Albums ==
=== Studio albums ===
List of studio albums, with selected chart positions, sales figures and certifications
Title	Details	Peak chart positions										Certifications
Title	Details	US	US R&B	AUS	CAN	GER	IRL	NZ	SWE	SWI	UK	Certifications
Southernplayalisticadillacmuzik	Released: April 26, 1994 (US); Label: LaFace, Arista; Formats: CD, LP, CS, DL	20	3	—	—	—	—	—	—	—	—	RIAA: Platinum
ATLiens	Released: August 27, 1996 (US); Label: LaFace, Arista; Formats: CD, LP, CS, DL	2	1	—	16	82	—	—	—	—	—	RIAA: 2× Platinum; MC: Gold
Aquemini	Released: September 29, 1998 (US); Label: LaFace, Arista; Formats: CD, LP, CS, DL	2	2	—	17	66	—	—	—	—	—	RIAA: 3× Platinum; BPI: Silver; MC: Gold
Stankonia	Released: October 31, 2000 (US); Label: LaFace, Arista; Formats: CD, LP, CS, DL	2	2	33	4	6	29	17	15	14	10	RIAA: 5× Platinum; ARIA: Gold; BPI: Platinum; MC: 3× Platinum; RMNZ: Platinum
Speakerboxxx/The Love Below	Released: September 23, 2003 (US); Label: Arista; Formats: CD, LP, CS, DL	1	1	9	4	21	3	3	11	11	8	RIAA: 13× Platinum; ARIA: 2× Platinum; BPI: 3× Platinum; BVMI: Gold; IFPI SWE: Gold; MC: Gold; IFPI SWI: Gold; RMNZ: 3× Platinum
Idlewild	Released: August 22, 2006 (US); Label: LaFace; Formats: CD, LP, CS, DL	2	1	27	6	33	19	13	18	4	16	RIAA: Platinum; MC: Gold
"—" denotes a recording that did not chart or was not released in that territory.

=== Compilation albums ===
List of compilation albums, with selected chart positions and certifications
Title	Details	Peak chart positions					Certifications
Title	Details	US	US R&B	GER	NZ	UK	Certifications
Big Boi and Dre Present... Outkast	Released: December 4, 2001 (US); Label: Arista; Formats: CD, LP, CS, DL	18	4	78	25	167	RIAA: Platinum; BPI: Silver; RMNZ: Platinum

=== Video albums ===
List of video albums, with selected chart positions and certifications
Title	Details	Peak chart positions	Certifications
Title	Details	US Video	Certifications
The Videos	Released: December 16, 2003 (US); Label: Arista; Format: DVD, UMD	17	RIAA: Platinum

== Commercial singles ==
=== As lead artist ===
List of singles as lead artist, with selected chart positions and certifications, showing year released and album name
Title	Year	Peak chart positions										Certifications	Album
Title	Year	US	US R&B	US Rap	AUS	GER	IRL	NZ	SWE	SWI	UK	Certifications	Album
"Player's Ball"	1993	37	12	1	—	—	—	—	—	—	—	RIAA: Gold	Southernplayalisticadillacmuzik
"Southernplayalisticadillacmuzik"	1994	74	41	9	—	—	—	—	—	—	—	RIAA: Gold	Southernplayalisticadillacmuzik
"Git Up, Git Out" (featuring Goodie Mob)	1994	— (Note: "Git Up, Git Out" did not enter the Billboard Hot 100, but peaked at number 9 on the Bubbling Under Hot 100 chart, which acts as an extension to the Hot 100.)	59	13	—	—	—	—	—	—	—		Southernplayalisticadillacmuzik
"Elevators (Me & You)"	1996	12	5	1	—	—	—	—	—	—	—	RIAA: Platinum	ATLiens
"ATLiens" / "Wheelz of Steel" (Note: "ATLiens" and "Wheelz of Steel" were released together as a double A-side single.)	1996	35	23	3	—	93	—	—	—	—	—	RIAA: Platinum; RMNZ: Platinum	ATLiens
"Jazzy Belle"	1997	52	25	7	—	—	—	—	—	—	—		ATLiens
"Skew It on the Bar-B" (featuring Raekwon)	1998	—	—	—	—	—	—	—	—	—	—		Aquemini
"Rosa Parks"	1999	55	19	—	—	57	—	—	—	—	—	RIAA: Platinum; RMNZ: Gold	Aquemini
"Da Art of Storytellin' (Pt. 1)" (featuring Slick Rick)	1999	—	67	—	—	—	—	—	—	—	—	RIAA: Gold	Aquemini
"B.O.B"	2000	—	69	—	—	—	—	—	—	—	61	RIAA: Platinum; RMNZ: Gold	Stankonia
"Ms. Jackson"	2000	1	1	1	2	1	5	5	1	2	2	RIAA: 8× Platinum; ARIA: 5× Platinum; BPI: 3× Platinum; BVMI: 3× Gold; IFPI SWE: Platinum; IFPI SWI: Gold; RMNZ: 7× Platinum	Stankonia
"So Fresh, So Clean"	2001	30	10	13	46	42	34	46	47	41	16	RIAA: 2× Platinum; ARIA: Gold; BPI: Gold; RMNZ: 2× Platinum	Stankonia
"The Whole World" (featuring Killer Mike)	2001	19	8	21	95	30	24	4	26	79	19	RIAA: Gold	Big Boi and Dre Present... Outkast
"Land of a Million Drums" (featuring Killer Mike and Sleepy Brown)	2002	—	— (Note: "Land of a Million Drums" did not enter the Hot R&B/Hip-Hop Songs chart, but peaked at number 16 on the Bubbling Under R&B/Hip-Hop Singles chart, which acts as an extension to the Hot R&B/Hip-Hop Songs chart.)	—	—	59	38	—	49	—	46		Scooby-Doo (soundtrack)
"Hey Ya!"	2003	1	9	—	1	6	2	2	1	9	3	RIAA: Diamond; ARIA: 11× Platinum; BPI: 5× Platinum; BVMI: 2× Platinum; IFPI SWE: Platinum; MC: Gold; RMNZ: 7× Platinum	Speakerboxxx/The Love Below
"The Way You Move" (featuring Sleepy Brown)	2003	1	2	1	7	31	18	6	33	49	7	RIAA: 3× Platinum; ARIA: Platinum; BPI: Silver; RMNZ: Platinum	Speakerboxxx/The Love Below
"GhettoMusick"	2003	—	93	—	43 (Note: "GhettoMusick" and "Prototype" charted as a double A-side single in certain territories.)	—	—	—	—	—	55		Speakerboxxx/The Love Below
"Roses"	2004	9	12	5	2	21	6	5	—	65	4	RIAA: 3× Platinum; ARIA: 2× Platinum; BPI: Platinum; BVMI: Gold; RMNZ: 2× Platinum	Speakerboxxx/The Love Below
"Prototype"	2004	—	63	—	43	85	—	—	—	—	101	RIAA: Gold	Speakerboxxx/The Love Below
"Mighty O"	2006	77	30	18	—	—	—	—	—	—	—		Idlewild
"Morris Brown" (featuring Sleepy Brown and Scar)	2006	95	— (Note: "Morris Brown" did not enter the Hot R&B/Hip-Hop Songs chart, but peaked at number 2 on the Bubbling Under R&B/Hip-Hop Singles chart, which acts as an extension to the Hot R&B/Hip-Hop Songs chart.)	—	—	98	39	32	—	57	43		Idlewild
"Idlewild Blue (Don'tchu Worry 'Bout Me)"	2006	100	—	—	—	—	—	—	—	—	—		Idlewild
"Hollywood Divorce" (featuring Lil Wayne and Snoop Dogg)	2006	—	— (Note: "Hollywood Divorce" did not enter the Hot R&B/Hip-Hop Songs chart, but peaked at number 20 on the Bubbling Under R&B/Hip-Hop Singles chart, which acts as an extension to the Hot R&B/Hip-Hop Songs chart.)	—	—	—	—	—	—	—	—		Idlewild
"The Train" (featuring Sleepy Brown and Scar)	2006	—	—	—	—	—	—	—	—	—	—		Idlewild
"—" denotes a recording that did not chart or was not released in that territory.

=== As featured artist ===
List of singles as featured artist, with selected chart positions, showing year released and album name
Title	Year	Peak chart positions			Album
Title	Year	US	US R&B	US Rap	Album
"Black Ice (Sky High)" (Goodie Mob featuring Outkast)	1998	50	48	13	Still Standing
"Watch for the Hook" (Cool Breeze featuring Outkast and Goodie Mob)	1998	73	18	1	East Point's Greatest Hit
"Street Talkin'" (Slick Rick featuring Outkast)	1999	—	65	22	The Art of Storytelling
"Neck uv da Woods" (Mystikal featuring Outkast)	1999	—	73	—	The Wood (soundtrack) and Let's Get Ready
"Akshon (Yeah!)" (Killer Mike featuring Outkast)	2002	—	— (Note: "Akshon (Yeah!)" did not enter the Hot R&B/Hip-Hop Songs chart, but peaked at number 13 on the Bubbling Under R&B/Hip-Hop Singles chart, which acts as an extension to the Hot R&B/Hip-Hop Songs chart.)	—	Monster
"I Can't Wait" (Sleepy Brown featuring Outkast)	2004	40	18	—	Barbershop 2: Back in Business (soundtrack) and Mr. Brown
"International Players Anthem (I Choose You)" (UGK featuring Outkast)	2007	70	12	10	Underground Kingz
"The Art of Storytellin' Part 4" (DJ Drama featuring Outkast and Marsha Ambrosius)	2008	—	91	—	Gangsta Grillz: The Album
"—" denotes a recording that did not chart.

== Promotional singles ==
=== As lead artist ===
List of promotional singles as lead artist, with selected chart positions, showing year released and album name
Title	Year	Peak chart positions	Certifications	Album
Title	Year	US R&B	Certifications	Album
"In Due Time" (featuring CeeLo Green)	1997	— (Note: "In Due Time" did not enter the Hot R&B/Hip-Hop Songs chart, but peaked at number 75 on the R&B/Hip-Hop Airplay chart.)		Soul Food (soundtrack)
"SpottieOttieDopaliscious"	1998	— (Note: "SpottieOttieDopaliscious" did not enter the Hot R&B/Hip-Hop Songs chart, but peaked at number 5 on the Bubbling Under R&B/Hip-Hop Singles chart, which acts as an extension to the Hot R&B/Hip-Hop Songs chart.)	RIAA: Gold; RMNZ: Gold	Aquemini

=== As featured artist ===
List of promotional singles as featured artist, with selected chart positions, showing year released and album name
Title	Year	Peak chart positions	Album
Title	Year	US R&B	Album
"Gone Be Fine" (Monica featuring Outkast)	1999	— (Note: "Gone Be Fine" did not enter the Hot R&B/Hip-Hop Songs chart, but peaked at number 5 on the Bubbling Under R&B/Hip-Hop Singles chart, which acts as an extension to the Hot R&B/Hip-Hop Songs chart.)	The Boy Is Mine
"Throw Your Hands Up" (8Ball & MJG featuring Outkast)	1999	—	In Our Lifetime
"Again" (Stankonia Remix) (Lenny Kravitz featuring Outkast)	2001	—	Non-album single
"Walk It Out" (Remix) (Unk featuring Outkast and Jim Jones)	2007	—	Beat'n Down Yo Block! (Deluxe Edition)
"—" denotes a recording that did not chart.

== Guest appearances ==
List of non-single guest appearances, with other performing artists, showing year released and album name
Title	Year	Other performer(s)	Album
"What About Your Friends" (Remix)	1992	TLC	—N/a
"Phobia"	1995	Organized Noise	Higher Learning (soundtrack)
"Benz or Beamer"	1995	Organized Noise	New Jersey Drive, Vol. 1 (soundtrack)
"Everlasting"	1997	Organized Noise	Nothing to Lose (soundtrack)
"Dez Only 1"	1998	Witchdoctor	A S.W.A.T. Healin' Ritual
"High Schoolin'"	1999	Slimm Calhoun	Light It Up (soundtrack)
"Smokefest 1999"	1999	Tash, B-Real, Phil da Agony	Rap Life
"Sole Sunday"	2000	Goodie Mob	Any Given Sunday (soundtrack)
"Tough Guy"	2000	UGK	Shaft (soundtrack)
"Funkanella"	2000	Slimm Calhoun, Killer Mike	Backstage (soundtrack)
"Speedballin'"	2001	CeeLo Green, Joi	Lara Croft: Tomb Raider (soundtrack)
"Fresh and Clean" (Remix)	2001	Snoop Dogg	Bones (soundtrack)
"Hey Baby" (Stank Remix)	2002	No Doubt, Killer Mike	Rock Steady (Special Edition)

== Music videos ==
=== As lead artist ===
List of music videos as lead artist, with directors, showing year released
Title	Year	Director(s)
"Player's Ball"	1993	Sean Combs
"Southernplayalisticadillacmuzik"	1994	F. Gary Gray
"Git Up, Git Out" (featuring Goodie Mob)	1994	Marcus Turner
"Benz or Beamer"	1995	Hype Williams
"Elevators (Me & You)"	1996	Michael Martin
"ATLiens"	1996	Michael Martin
"Jazzy Belle"	1997	Bille Woodruff
"In Due Time" (featuring CeeLo Green)	1997	Erykah Badu, OutKast
"Rosa Parks"	1998	Gregory Dark
"Skew It on the Bar-B" (featuring Raekwon)	1998	Bryan Barber, J. Kevin Swain
"Da Art of Storytellin' (Pt. 1)" (featuring Slick Rick)	1999	Gregory Dark
"B.O.B"	2000	Dave Meyers
"Ms. Jackson"	2000	F. Gary Gray
"So Fresh, So Clean"	2001	Dave Meyers
"The Whole World" (featuring Killer Mike)	2001	Bryan Barber
"Trans DF Express" (with Dungeon Family)	2001	Bryan Barber
"Land of a Million Drums" (featuring Killer Mike and Sleepy Brown)	2002	Bryan Barber
"Hey Ya!"	2003	Bryan Barber
"The Way You Move" (featuring Sleepy Brown)	2003	Bryan Barber
"Roses"	2004	Bryan Barber
"Prototype"	2004	André 3000
"Morris Brown" (featuring Sleepy Brown and Scar)	2006	Bryan Barber
"Idlewild Blue (Don'tchu Worry 'Bout Me)"	2006	Paul Hunter

=== As featured artist ===
List of music videos as featured artist, with directors, showing year released
Title	Year	Director(s)
"Watch for the Hook" (Cool Breeze featuring Outkast and Goodie Mob)	1998	David Nelson
"Black Ice (Sky High)" (Goodie Mob featuring Outkast)	1998	Gregory Dark
"Street Talkin'" (Slick Rick featuring Outkast)	1999	Ron Hightower, Bille Woodruff
"Neck uv da Woods" (Mystikal featuring Outkast)	1999	Director X
"Akshon (Yeah!)" (Killer Mike featuring Outkast)	2002	—N/a
"I Can't Wait" (Sleepy Brown featuring Outkast)	2004	Bryan Barber
"International Players Anthem (I Choose You)" (UGK featuring Outkast)	2007	Bryan Barber

== See also ==
- List of songs recorded by Outkast
- André 3000 discography
- Big Boi discography
