= List of songs recorded by Outkast =

The following is a list of songs recorded by the American hip hop duo OutKast.

Song Title	Year	Album	Length	Other performer(s)	Producer(s)
"Again" (Stankonia Remix)	2001	—N/a	3:45	Lenny Kravitz	Lenny Kravitz
"Ain't No Thang"	1994	Southernplayalisticadillacmuzik	5:39	—N/a	Organized Noize
"Akshon (Yeah!)"	2002	Monster	2:48	Killer Mike	Swiffman
"Aquemini"	1998	Aquemini	5:19	—N/a	OutKast
"Da Art of Storytellin' (Pt. 1)"	1998	Aquemini	3:43	Slick Rick (single version)	Mr. DJ
"Da Art of Storytellin' (Pt. 2)"	1998	Aquemini	2:48	—N/a	Mr. DJ
"The Art of Storytellin' Part 4"	2007	Gangsta Grillz: The Album	4:57	DJ Drama, Marsha Ambrosius	Don Cannon
"ATLiens"	1996	ATLiens	3:50	—N/a	Earthtone Ideas
"B.O.B (Bombs over Baghdad)"	2000	Stankonia	5:04	—N/a	Earthtone III
"Babylon"	1996	ATLiens	4:24	—N/a	Organized Noize
"A Bad Note"	2006	Idlewild	8:47	—N/a	André 3000
"Behold a Lady"	2003	Speakerboxxx/The Love Below	4:37	—N/a	André 3000
"Benz or Beamer"	1995	New Jersey Drive, Vol. 1	4:15	—N/a	Organized Noize
"Black Ice"	1998	Still Standing	3:25	Goodie Mob	Mr. DJ
"Bowtie"	2003	Speakerboxxx/The Love Below	3:56	Sleepy Brown, Jazze Pha	Big Boi
"Buggface"	2006	Idlewild	2:45	—N/a	Jeminesse Smith, Mr. DJ
"Bust"	2003	Speakerboxxx/The Love Below	3:08	Killer Mike	Big Boi
"Call of da Wild"	1994	Southernplayalisticadillacmuzik	6:06	Goodie Mob	Organized Noize
"Call the Law"	2006	Idlewild	4:51	Janelle Monáe	André 3000
"Chonkyfire"	1998	Aquemini	6:10	—N/a	OutKast
"Chronomentrophobia"	2006	Idlewild	2:12	—N/a	André 3000
"Church"	2003	Speakerboxxx/The Love Below	3:27	—N/a	André 3000
"Claimin' True"	1994	Southernplayalisticadillacmuzik	4:43	—N/a	Organized Noize
"Crumblin' Erb"	1994	Southernplayalisticadillacmuzik	5:10	—N/a	Organized Noize
"D.E.E.P."	1994	Southernplayalisticadillacmuzik	5:31	—N/a	Organized Noize
"Decatur Psalm"	1996	ATLiens	3:58	Big Gipp, Cool Breeze	Organized Noize
"Dez Only 1"	1998	A S.W.A.T. Healin' Ritual	4:13	Witchdoctor	Organized Noize
"Dracula's Wedding"	2003	Speakerboxxx/The Love Below	2:32	Kelis	André 3000
"Dyin' to Live"	2006	Idlewild	2:07	—N/a	André 3000
"E.T. (Extraterrestrial)"	1996	ATLiens	3:06	—N/a	Earthtone Ideas
"Elevators (Me & You)"	1996	ATLiens	4:25	—N/a	Earthtone Ideas
"Elevators (Me & You)" (ONP 86 Remix)	1996	ATLiens	4:37	—N/a	Organized Noize
"Everlasting"	1997	Nothing to Lose: Music from and Inspired by the Motion Picture	4:09	—N/a	OutKast
"Flip Flop Rock"	2003	Speakerboxxx/The Love Below	4:35	Killer Mike, Jay-Z	Big Boi, Mr. DJ
"Fresh and Clean" (Remix)	2001	Bones: Original Motion Houndtrack	3:59	Snoop Dogg	Earthtone III
"Funkanella"	2000	Backstage: Music Inspired by the Film	4:06	Killer Mike, Slimm Calhoun	Earthtone III
"Funkin' Around"	2001	Big Boi and Dre Present... Outkast	4:34	—N/a	Earthtone III
"Funky Ride"	1994	Southernplayalisticadillacmuzik	6:31	—N/a	Organized Noize
"Gangsta Shit"	2000	Stankonia	4:41	Slimm Calhoun, BlackOwned C-Bone, T-Mo	Earthtone III
"Gasoline Dreams"	2000	Stankonia	3:34	Khujo	Earthtone III
"GhettoMusick"	2003	Speakerboxxx/The Love Below	3:56	—N/a	André 3000
"Git Up, Git Out"	1994	Southernplayalisticadillacmuzik	7:27	Goodie Mob	Organized Noize
"Gone Be Fine"	1998	The Boy Is Mine	4:17	Monica	Dallas Austin
"Greatest Shot On Earth"	2006	Idlewild	3:06	Macy Gray	André 3000
"Happy Valentine's Day"	2003	Speakerboxxx/The Love Below	5:23	—N/a	André 3000
"Hey Baby" (Stank Remix)	2002	Rock Steady (Special Edition)	4:07	No Doubt	Sly and Robbie, No Doubt, Mark "Spike" Stent
"Hey Ya!"	2003	Speakerboxxx/The Love Below	3:55	—N/a	André 3000
"High Schoolin'"	1999	Music from and Inspired by the Movie Light It Up	4:18	Slimm Calhoun	OutKast
"Hollywood Divorce"	2006	Idlewild	5:23	Lil Wayne, Snoop Dogg	André 3000
"Hootie Hoo"	1994	Southernplayalisticadillacmuzik	3:59	—N/a	Organized Noize
"Humble Mumble"	2000	Stankonia	4:50	Erykah Badu	Earthtone III
"I Can't Wait"	2004	Barbershop 2: Back In Business Soundtrack	4:34	Sleepy Brown	Organized Noize
"Idlewild Blue (Don'tchu Worry 'Bout Me)"	2006	Idlewild	3:24	—N/a	André 3000
"In Due Time"	1997	Soul Food Soundtrack	3:53	Cee Lo Green	OutKast
"In Your Dreams"	2006	Idlewild	3:34	Killer Mike, Janelle Monáe	André 3000
"International Players Anthem (I Choose You)"	2007	Underground Kingz	4:19	UGK	DJ Paul, Juicy J
"I'll Call Before I Come"	2000	Stankonia	4:18	Gangsta Boo, Eco	Earthtone III
"Jazzy Belle"	1996	ATLiens	4:11	—N/a	Organized Noize
"Knowing"	2003	Speakerboxxx/The Love Below	3:32	—N/a	Mr. DJ
"Land of a Million Drums"	2002	Music from the Motion Picture Scooby-Doo	4:05	Killer Mike, Sleepy Brown	André 3000
"Last Call"	2003	Speakerboxxx/The Love Below	3:57	Slimm Calhoun, Lil Jon & the East Side Boyz, Mello	André 3000
"Liberation"	1998	Aquemini	8:46	Cee Lo Green, Erykah Badu, Big Rube	OutKast
"A Life In the Day of Benjamin André"	2003	Speakerboxxx/The Love Below	5:11	—N/a	André 3000
"Life Is Like a Musical"	2006	Idlewild	2:14	—N/a	André 3000
"Love Hater"	2003	Speakerboxxx/The Love Below	2:49	—N/a	André 3000
"Love In War"	2003	Speakerboxxx/The Love Below	3:25	—N/a	André 3000
"Mainstream"	1996	ATLiens	5:18	Khujo, T-Mo	Earthtone Ideas
"Makes No Sense At All"	2006	Idlewild	2:53	—N/a	André 3000
"Mamacita"	1998	Aquemini	5:52	Masada, Witchdoctor	Organized Noize
"Mighty O"	2006	Idlewild	4:16	—N/a	Organized Noize
"Millennium"	1996	ATLiens	3:09	—N/a	Organized Noize
"Morris Brown"	2006	Idlewild	4:24	Scar, Sleepy Brown	André 3000
"Movin' Cool (The After Party)"	2001	Big Boi and Dre Present... Outkast	3:59	Joi	OutKast
"Ms. Jackson"	2000	Stankonia	4:30	—N/a	Earthtone III
"Mutron Angel"	2006	Idlewild	4:18	Whild Peach	Whild Peach
"My Favorite Things"	2003	Speakerboxxx/The Love Below	5:14	—N/a	André 3000
"Myintrotoletuknow"	1994	Southernplayalisticadillacmuzik	2:40	—N/a	Organized Noize
"Nathaniel"	1998	Aquemini	1:10	Supa Nate	OutKast
"Neck uv da Woods"	1999	Music from and Inspired by the Motion Picture The Wood	4:06	Mystikal	Earthtone III
"N2U"	2006	Idlewild	3:40	Khujo	Organized Noize
"Ova da Wudz"	1996	ATLiens	3:47	—N/a	Earthtone Ideas
"Peaches"	2006	Idlewild	3:10	Sleepy Brown, Scar	Organized Noize
"Phobia"	1995	Music from the Motion Picture Higher Learning	5:57	—N/a	Organized Noize
"Pink & Blue"	2003	Speakerboxxx/The Love Below	5:04	—N/a	André 3000
"PJ & Rooster"	2006	Idlewild	4:27	—N/a	André 3000
"Player's Ball"	1993	Southernplayalisticadillacmuzik	4:21	—N/a	Organized Noize
"Player's Ball" (Reprise)	1994	Southernplayalisticadillacmuzik	2:20	—N/a	Organized Noize
"Prototype"	2003	Speakerboxxx/The Love Below	5:26	—N/a	André 3000
"Red Velvet"	2000	Stankonia	3:52	—N/a	Earthtone III
"Reset"	2003	Speakerboxxx/The Love Below	4:35	Khujo, Cee Lo Green	Big Boi
"Return of the G"	1998	Aquemini	4:49	—N/a	Organized Noize
"The Rooster"	2003	Speakerboxxx/The Love Below	3:57	—N/a	Carl Mo, Big Boi
"Rosa Parks"	1998	Aquemini	5:24	—N/a	OutKast
"Roses"	2003	Speakerboxxx/The Love Below	6:09	—N/a	André 3000, Dojo5
"She Lives In My Lap"	2003	Speakerboxxx/The Love Below	4:27	Rosario Dawson	André 3000
"She's Alive"	2003	Speakerboxxx/The Love Below	4:06	—N/a	André 3000
"Skew It on the Bar-B"	1998	Aquemini	3:15	Raekwon	Organized Noize
"Slum Beautiful"	2000	Stankonia	4:07	Cee Lo Green	Earthtone III
"Slump"	1998	Aquemini	5:09	Backbone, Cool Breeze	OutKast
"Smokefest 1999"	1999	Rap Life	4:59	Tash, B-Real, Phil da Agony	E-Swift
"Snappin' & Trappin'"	2000	Stankonia	4:19	Killer Mike, J-Sweet	Earthtone III
"So Fresh, So Clean"	2000	Stankonia	4:00	—N/a	Organized Noize
"Sole Sunday"	2000	Music from the Motion Picture Any Given Sunday	3:59	Goodie Mob	Mr. DJ
"Southernplayalisticadillacmuzik"	1994	Southernplayalisticadillacmuzik	5:18	—N/a	Organized Noize
"Spaghetti Junction"	2000	Stankonia	3:57	—N/a	Organized Noize
"Speedballin'"	2001	Lara Croft: Tomb Raider Original Motion Picture	4:56	Cee Lo Green, Joi	Organized Noize
"SpottieOttieDopaliscious"	1998	Aquemini	7:07	Sleepy Brown	OutKast
"Spread"	2003	Speakerboxxx/The Love Below	3:51	—N/a	André 3000
"Stankonia (Stanklove)"	2000	Stankonia	6:51	Big Rube, Sleepy Brown	Earthtone III
"Street Talkin'"	1999	The Art of Storytelling	3:41	Slick Rick	Jazze Pha
"Synthesizer"	1998	Aquemini	5:11	George Clinton	OutKast
"Take Off Your Cool"	2003	Speakerboxxx/The Love Below	2:38	Norah Jones	André 3000
"Throw Your Hands Up"	1999	In Our Lifetime, Vol. 1	5:25	8Ball & MJG	Mr. DJ
"Toilet Tisha"	2000	Stankonia	4:24	—N/a	Earthtone III
"Tomb of the Boom"	2003	Speakerboxxx/The Love Below	4:46	Konkrete, Big Gipp, Ludacris	Big Boi
"Tough Guy"	2000	Music from and Inspired by Shaft	5:44	UGK	Earthtone III
"The Train"	2006	Idlewild	4:09	Sleepy Brown, Scar	Big Boi
"Two Dope Boyz (In a Cadillac)"	1996	ATLiens	2:42	—N/a	Organized Noize
"Unhappy"	2003	Speakerboxxx/The Love Below	3:19	—N/a	Mr. DJ
"Vibrate"	2003	Speakerboxxx/The Love Below	6:38	—N/a	André 3000
"Wailin'"	1996	ATLiens	1:58	—N/a	Organized Noize
"Walk It Out" (Remix)	2007	Beat'n Down Yo Block! (Deluxe Edition)	4:55	Unk, Jim Jones	Unk
"War"	2003	Speakerboxxx/The Love Below	2:43	—N/a	Mr. DJ
"Watch for the Hook" (Dungeon Family Mix)	1998	East Point's Greatest Hit	3:53	Cool Breeze, Goodie Mob, Witchdoctor	Organized Noize
"The Way You Move"	2003	Speakerboxxx/The Love Below	3:54	Sleepy Brown	Carl Mo, Big Boi
"We Luv Deez Hoez"	2000	Stankonia	4:10	Backbone, Big Gipp	Organized Noize
"West Savannah"	1998	Aquemini	4:03	—N/a	Organized Noize
"What About Your Friends" (Extended Mix)	1992	—N/a	4:55	TLC	Dallas Austin
"Wheelz of Steel"	1996	ATLiens	4:03	—N/a	Earthtone Ideas
"When I Look In Your Eyes"	2006	Idlewild	2:43	—N/a	André 3000
"The Whole World"	2001	Big Boi and Dre Present... Outkast	4:55	Killer Mike	OutKast
"Xplosion"	2000	Stankonia	4:08	B-Real	Earthtone III
"Y'all Scared"	1998	Aquemini	4:50	T-Mo, Big Gipp, Khujo	Mr. DJ
"13th Floor/Growing Old"	1996	ATLiens	6:50	—N/a	Organized Noize
"?"	2000	Stankonia	1:28	—N/a	Earthtone III
