= 8th Annual Black Reel Awards =

Film-industry awards in 2007

8th Black Reel Awards
- Date: February 7, 2007
- Location: Washington, D.C.

The 2007 Black Reel Awards, which annually recognize and celebrate the achievements of black people in feature, independent and television films, took place in Washington, D.C., on February 7, 2007. Dreamgirls was the bigger winner of the evening, taking home six awards, with Walkout taking home five awards.

== Winners and nominees ==
Winners are listed first and highlighted in bold.

Best Film	Best Director
**Dreamgirls**; Akeelah and the Bee; Inside Man; The Pursuit of Happyness; Something New	**Spike Lee – Inside Man**; Bryan Barber – Idlewild; Sanaa Hamri – Something New; Clark Johnson – The Sentinel; Chris Robinson – ATL
Best Actor	Best Actress
**Forest Whitaker – The Last King of Scotland**; Jamie Foxx – Dreamgirls; Derek Luke – Catch a Fire; Will Smith – The Pursuit of Happyness; Denzel Washington – Inside Man	**Keke Palmer – Akeelah and the Bee**; Beyoncé – Dreamgirls; Sanaa Lathan – Something New
Best Supporting Actor	Best Supporting Actress
**Djimon Hounsou – Blood Diamond**; Chiwetel Ejiofor – Kinky Boots; Chiwetel Ejiofor – Children of Men; Laurence Fishburne – Akeelah and the Bee; Eddie Murphy – Dreamgirls	**Jennifer Hudson – Dreamgirls**; Clare-Hope Ashitey – Children of Men; Angela Bassett – Akeelah and the Bee; Shareeka Epps – Half Nelson; Kerry Washington – The Last King of Scotland
Best Screenplay, Adapted or Original	Best Breakthrough Performance
**Kriss Turner – Something New**; Bryan Barber – Idlewild; Chris Cleveland and Bettina Gilois – Glory Road; Tina Gordon Chism – ATL; Tyler Perry – Madea's Family Reunion	**Jennifer Hudson – Dreamgirls**; Shareeka Epps – Half Nelson; Keke Palmer – Akeelah and the Bee; Paula Patton – Idlewild; Jaden Smith – The Pursuit of Happyness
Outstanding Original Score	Outstanding Original Soundtrack
**Harvey Mason Jr. and Damon Thomas – Dreamgirls**; Big Boi – Idlewild; Terence Blanchard – Inside Man; Lisa Coleman and Wendy Melvoin – Something New; Aaron Zigman – Akeelah and the Bee	**Dreamgirls**; Akeelah and the Bee; Dave Chappelle's Block Party; Something New; Take the Lead
Best Original or Adapted Song	Best Independent Film
**"And I Am Telling You I'm Not Going" from Dreamgirls – Jennifer Hudson**; "Idlewild Blues" from Idlewild – OutKast; "Listen" from Dreamgirls – Beyoncé; "One Night Only" from Dreamgirls – Jennifer Hudson; "People Get Ready" from Glory Road – Alicia Keys and Lyfe Jennings	**Traci Townsend – Craig Ross Jr.**; No. 2 – Toa Fraser; Premium – Pete Chatmon
Best Television Miniseries or Movie	Outstanding Director in a Television Miniseries or Movie
**Walkout (HBO) – Moctesuma Esparza and Robert A. Katz**; No other nominees	**Edward James Olmos – Walkout (HBO)**; No other nominees
Best Actor in a TV Movie or Limited Series	Best Actress in a TV Movie or Limited Series
**Andre Braugher – Thief (FX)**; No other nominees	**Alexa Vega – Walkout (HBO)**; No other nominees
Best Supporting Actor in a TV Movie or Limited Series	Best Supporting Actress in a TV Movie or Limited Series
**Michael Peña – Walkout (HBO)**; No other nominees	**Alfre Woodard – The Water is Wide (Hallmark)**; No other nominees
Outstanding Screenplay in a TV Movie or Limited Series
**Ernie Contreras, Marcus DeLeon and Timothy J. Sexton – Walkout (HBO)**; No other nominees
