= Idlewild (film) =

- Promotional poster
- Directed by: Bryan Barber
- Written by: Bryan Barber
- Produced by: Charles Roven; Robert Guralnick
- Starring: André 3000; Big Boi; Paula Patton; Terrence Howard; Faizon Love; Malinda Williams; Cicely Tyson; Macy Gray; Ben Vereen; Bruce Bruce; Patti LaBelle; Ving Rhames
- Cinematography: Pascal Rabaud
- Edited by: Anne Goursaud
- Music by: John Debney (score); Outkast (songs)
- Production companies: Atlas Entertainment; Forensic Films; HBO Films; Mosaic Media Group
- Distributed by: Universal Pictures
- Release date: August 25, 2006
- Running time: 121 minutes
- Country: United States
- Language: English
- Budget: $10 million
- Box office: $12.6 million

Idlewild is a 2006 American musical drama film written and directed by Bryan Barber. The film stars André 3000 and Big Boi of the hip hop duo Outkast and features musical numbers that were written, produced and chiefly performed by the group. Idlewild contrasts the group's hip-hop, funk, and soul sound against a story based on a juke joint in the fictional town of Idlewild, during the Great Depression in Georgia in 1935.

Distributed by Universal Pictures, the film is an HBO Films co-production alongside Mosaic Media Group and Forensic Films. It features an ensemble cast including Terrence Howard, Paula Jai Parker, Paula Patton, Cicely Tyson, Ben Vereen, Patti LaBelle, Ving Rhames, Macy Gray, Faizon Love, Bruce Bruce, Malinda Williams, Jackie Long and Bill Nunn. Idlewild received mixed reviews from critics and grossed $12.6 million worldwide.

== Plot ==
In 1935, in the town of Idlewild in Georgia, Percival works at his father's funeral home and at night plays piano at a local club called Church, where his childhood friend Rooster is a singer who is also bootlegging on the side. One night while he is performing, Rooster is visited by gangsters Spats, Trumpy, Ace, and Rose to talk about a deal they have with the club. Rooster and Rose retreat to a nearby warehouse and have sex in a car, where they are ambushed by the other three. Rose runs away and Trumpy kills Spats and Ace to get the business for himself. Trumpy later informs Rooster the debt owed by Ace is now his problem, and he has to make up the money by selling liquor at Church bought from Trumpy's "suppliers." Rooster goes to warn Rose, who leaves town watched by one of Trumpy's henchmen.

Aspiring singer Sally B. Shelley arrives at Church posing as Angel Davenport, a singer who has a contract with the club that Sally stole from her. Under pressure to make up the money he owes Trumpy, Rooster forces Sally to perform; seeing that she is anxious being on stage, Percival offers to accompany her and the two perform a song he wrote. The song makes Sally an overnight star and she is offered a record deal in Chicago. She asks Percival to go with her, but he is reluctant as he feels obligated to his father; when Sally finds out Percival knows who she really is, she pledges her love to him and persuades him to go with her.

Rooster devises a plan to buy liquor from bootlegger GW and his partner. While making his rounds to collect hooch from GW, Rooster gives all the money he has to an old woman, Mother Hopkins, and her grandchildren; in return, Mother Hopkins gives him a bible. Arriving at the collection point, Rooster sees Trumpy's henchmen have beaten up GW and killed his partner. Rooster is brought to Trumpy, and GW is shot and killed. Trumpy's henchman tries to shoot Rooster, but the bible in his jacket stops the bullet, and Rooster escapes, followed by Trumpy. Rooster arrives at Church, where Percival and Sally have stopped at before leaving for Chicago, where Percival is planning to propose marriage. Rooster and Trumpy fight, Trumpy pulls a gun on him but Percival saves Rooster by shooting Trumpy first. The stray bullet hits Sally, who dies of the wound shortly after.

Consumed with grief, Percival prepares Sally for her burial, and contemplates suicide by hanging. Instead, he is interrupted and consoled by Rooster, who decides to go straight. Percival gives Rooster Sally's ticket to Chicago, where Rooster goes to reconcile with his family. With encouragement from his father, Percival begins to follow his musical ambitions and starts making records and touring clubs across America.

== Cast ==
- André 3000 as Percival "Percy" Jenkins Jr.
- Big Boi as "Rooster"
  - Bobb'e J. Thompson as Young "Rooster"
- Paula Patton as Angel Davenport / Sally B. Shelly
- Terrence Howard as "Trumpy" / Wilbert
- Faizon Love as "Sunshine Ace"
- Malinda Williams as Zora
- Cicely Tyson as Mother Hopkins
- Jackie Long as Monk
- Macy Gray as "Taffy"
- Ben Vereen as Percival Jenkins Sr.
- Paula Jai Parker as Rose
- Patti LaBelle as The Real Angel Davenport
- Ving Rhames as "Spats"
- Karen Dyer as Eva, The Fire Diva
- Bill Nunn as G.W.
- Fonzworth Bentley as The Flask (voice)

== Soundtrack ==
The musical numbers are written and performed by OutKast, with other featured performances by Macy Gray and Debra Killings, who performed the singing voice of Patton's character. The hip hop, funk, and soul stylings of the song score are intentionally anachronistic, a choice made to complement the film being set in 1935. Elements of 1930s-era blues and jazz music are however featured prominently in many of the musical numbers. The film's dance numbers, choreographed by Hinton Battle, also feature many period dances, primarily the Lindy Hop and jitterbug.

Much of the songs in Idlewild had already been featured on the OutKast albums Big Boi and Dre Present...OutKast and Speakerboxxx/The Love Below, essentially making it a jukebox musical. Seven songs featured in the film come from the Outkast album of the same name, which was released by LaFace Records three days before the film.

=== Musical numbers ===
| # | Song title | Character(s)/ Performer(s) | Songwriters | Album |
|---|---|---|---|---|
| 1 | "Greatest Show on Earth" | Taffy (Macy Gray featuring OutKast) | André Benjamin | Idlewild |
| 2 | "Makes No Sense at All" | Percival (André 3000) | André Benjamin | Idlewild |
| 3 | "Bowtie" | Rooster (Big Boi featuring Sleepy Brown and Jazze Pha) | Antwan Andre Patton, Patrick Brown, Phalon Alexander | Speakerboxxx/The Love Below |
| 4 | "Chronomentrophobia" | Percival (André 3000) | André Benjamin | Idlewild |
| 5 | "The Rooster" | Rooster (Big Boi) | Antwan Andre Patton, Carlton "Carl Mo" Mahone, Donnie Mathis | Speakerboxxx/The Love Below |
| 6 | "Movin' Cool (The After Party)" | Percival & Angel (André 3000 and Paula Patton, dubbed by Debra Killings) | André Benjamin, Antwan Andre Patton, David Sheats, Joi Gilliam-Gipp | Big Boi and Dre Present...OutKast (The original LP version of this song features Joi instead of Killings) |
| 7 | "Take Off Your Cool" | André 3000 and Norah Jones (song not performed by characters in film) | André Benjamin | Speakerboxx/The Love Below |
| 8 | "Church" | Rooster (Big Boi) | Antwan Andre Patton, Andre Benjamin, Kevin Kendricks, Myrna Crenshaw, Patrick Brown | Speakerboxx/The Love Below |
| 9 | "She Lives in My Lap" | Percival (André 3000) | André Benjamin, Willie Dennis, Dino Hawkins, Isaac Hayes, Brad Jordan, Doug King, Roger Troutman, Eric Vidal | Speakerboxx/The Love Below (The original LP version of this song features Rosario Dawson) |
| 10 | "Vibrate" | Percival (André 3000) | André Benjamin | Speakerboxx/The Love Below |
| 11 | "Mutron Angel" | Outkast featuring Whild Peach (song not performed by characters in film) | Antwan Andre Patton, David Whild Brown, Myrna Crenshaw Brown | Idlewild |
| 12 | "When I Look in Your Eyes" | Percival (André 3000) | Andre Benjamin, Kevin Kendrick | Idlewild |
| 13 | "PJ & Rooster" | Percival (André 3000) | Andre Benjamin, Antwan Andre Patton | Idlewild |
| 14 | "Morris Brown" | Big Boi featuring Scar and Sleepy Brown (song not performed by characters in film) | Andre Benjamin, Antwan Andre Patton, Terrence Smith | Idlewild |

== Reception ==
Idlewild received mixed reviews from critics. As of August 2026, the film holds a 47% approval rating on Rotten Tomatoes, based on 129 reviews with an average rating of 5.8/10. The website's critics consensus reads: "Idlewild has some truly breathtaking moments, but borrows too heavily from other similar movies, and the disjointed script is not worthy of talents involved." On Metacritic, the film has a weighted average score of 55 out of 100, based on 31 critics, indicating "mixed or average reviews".

Peter Travers of Rolling Stone said the film "can't decide if it's about bullets, booze, broads or the sound of hip-hop that the film strenuously tries to marry to the 1930s". Writing for Film Journal International, Frank Lovece wrote "Seemingly meant as an African-American Moulin Rouge, this visual blast of an homage to classic Hollywood musicals settles in as an odd hybrid, neither fish nor fowl. Nor foul, either, though not great — and ultimately, more idle than wild". Teresa Wiltz of The Washington Post likewise acknowledged director Bryan Barber's inventiveness, saying that, "For all its shortcomings, Idlewild also has something that few films can pull off: Moments of such pure cinematic fabulousness, breathtaking dance sequences and idiosyncratic flourishes that we are more than willing to forgive it for all its sins".

The film grossed $12,571,185 domestically and $71,842 internationally, totaling $12,643,027 worldwide on a $10 million budget.

== Awards and nominations ==
| Year | Award | Category | Recipient | Result |
|---|---|---|---|---|
| 2007 | Black Reel Awards | Outstanding Director | Bryan Barber | Nominated |
| 2007 | Black Reel Awards | Outstanding Screenplay, Adapted or Original | Bryan Barber | Nominated |
| 2007 | Black Reel Awards | Outstanding Original Score | Big Boi | Nominated |
| 2007 | Black Reel Awards | Outstanding Original Song | "Idlewild Blue (Don'tchu Worry 'Bout Me)" | Nominated |
| 2007 | Grammy Awards | Best Urban/Alternative Performance | "Idlewild Blue (Don'tchu Worry 'Bout Me)" | Nominated |
| 2007 | NAACP Image Awards | Outstanding Duo or Group | "Idlewild Blue (Don'tchu Worry 'Bout Me)" | Nominated |

== See also ==
- Idlewild (Outkast album)
- List of hood films
