= The Train (song) =

Single by OutKast featuring Scar and Sleepy Brown

from the album Idlewild
- Released: December 19, 2006 (U.S.)
- Genre: Hip hop
- Length: 4:26
- Label: Sony BMG, Zomba, LaFace
- Songwriter(s): Antwan Patton, David Brown, Joi Gilliam, Kevin Kendrick, Myrna Crenshaw, P. Brown, T. Smith
- Producer(s): Big Boi

OutKast singles chronology
"Hollywood Divorce" (2006)	"The Train" (2006)	"International Players Anthem (I Choose You)" (2007)

"The Train" is the fifth and final single to be released from OutKast's sixth studio album, Idlewild. The song features Scar and Sleepy Brown on guest vocals. The single was released in December 2006, and was the last official single to be released by Outkast.

== Track listings ==
UK CD single

1. "The Train" (clean version) – 4:26
2. "The Train" (explicit version) – 4:26
3. "The Train" (instrumental) – 4:26

12" vinyl single

1. "The Train" (clean version) – 4:26
2. "The Train" (explicit version) – 4:26
3. "The Train" (instrumental) – 4:26
4. "N2U" (clean version) – 5:18
5. "N2U" (explicit version) – 5:18
6. "N2U" (instrumental) – 5:18

== Charts ==
Chart (2006)	Peak position
Russian Airplay Chart	87
