= Bryan Barber =

American music video director (born 1970)

Bryan Barber (born December 20, 1970) is a music video and motion picture filmmaker. He has directed many music videos for popular artists, including Outkast's "The Way You Move" and "The Whole World". Barber is known for sprinkling scenes from classic film and television into his music videos.

Barber's first feature film was 2006's Idlewild, which he wrote, directed, and co-produced. The film is a 1930s musical set in the fictional Georgia town of Idlewild. The film starred Outkast (whose members are André 3000 and Big Boi), Paula Patton, Terrence Howard and Faizon Love. Outkast contributed a song and also produced an accompanying soundtrack album.

Barber spent "$50,000 for a presentation that included motion capture, stunts, concept art, storyboards and sound design" to try to get the job directing X-Men Origins: Wolverine from 20th Century Fox. He did not get the job but Fox was impressed enough with it that they reimbursed Barber. Barber is currently working on an adaptation of Gigantor after acquiring the rights from Fred Ladd.
