= Hollywood Divorce =

Single by OutKast featuring Lil Wayne and Snoop Dogg

from the album Idlewild
- Released: November 7, 2006 (US)
- Genre: Hip hop
- Length: 5:23
- Label: LaFace Records
- Songwriters: André Benjamin, Antwan Patton, D. Carter, C. Broadus
- Producer: André 3000

OutKast singles chronology
"Idlewild Blue (Don'tchu Worry 'Bout Me)" (2006)	"Hollywood Divorce" (2006)	"The Train" (2006)

Lil Wayne singles chronology
"Leather So Soft" (2006)	"Hollywood Divorce" (2006)	"Make It Rain (Remix)" (2007)

Snoop Dogg singles chronology
"That's That" (2006)	"Hollywood Divorce" (2006)	"Candy (Drippin' Like Water)" (2006)

"Hollywood Divorce" is a song by the American hip-hop duo OutKast, featuring Lil Wayne and Snoop Dogg on guest vocals. It was released on November 7, 2006 as the fourth single from their album Idlewild.

It is one of the three songs from the album that both members of OutKast appear on, along with "Mighty 'O'" and "PJ & Rooster". The single peaked at number 20 on the US Billboard Bubbling Under R&B/Hip-Hop Singles chart.

== Track listings ==
UK CD single

1. "Hollywood Divorce" (main version) – 5:23
2. "Hollywood Divorce" (clean version) – 5:23
3. "Hollywood Divorce" (instrumental) – 5:23

12" vinyl single

1. "Hollywood Divorce" (main version) – 5:23
2. "Hollywood Divorce" (main version instrumental) – 5:23
3. "Hollywood Divorce" (clean version) – 5:23
4. "Hollywood Divorce" (clean version instrumental) – 5:23

== Charts ==
Chart (2006)	Peak position
US Billboard Bubbling Under R&B/Hip-Hop Singles	20
