= Idlewild (Outkast album) =

2006 studio album / soundtrack album by Outkast

Studio album and soundtrack album by Outkast
- Released: August 22, 2006
- Genres: Hip hop; swing; Delta blues; hot jazz; jump blues; soul
- Length: 77:52
- Labels: LaFace; Zomba
- Producers: André 3000; Big Boi; Chuck Lightning; Janelle Monáe; Jeminesse Smith; Kevin Kendricks; Nate "Rocket" Wonder; Mr. DJ; Organized Noize; Whild Peach

Outkast chronology
Speakerboxxx/The Love Below (2003)	Idlewild (2006)

Singles from Idlewild
- 1. "Mighty O" Released: June 6, 2006; 2. "Morris Brown" Released: August 15, 2006; 3. "Idlewild Blue (Don'tchu Worry 'Bout Me)" Released: September 12, 2006; 4. "Hollywood Divorce" Released: November 7, 2006; 5. "The Train" Released: December 19, 2006

Idlewild is the sixth and final studio album by the American hip hop duo Outkast. It was released on August 22, 2006, by LaFace Records and served as the soundtrack album to the duo's musical film of the same name, which was released that same month. Containing themes relating to the music industry, the album also featured songs not included in the film while incorporating jazz, blues, swing, and soul styles in its music.

The album debuted at number two on the US Billboard 200 chart, selling 196,000 copies in its first week. It achieved minimal international charting and produced five singles that attained moderate Billboard chart success. Despite mixed criticism towards its unconventional musical style and loose thematic structure, Idlewild received positive reviews from most music critics upon its release. The album has been certified platinum in sales by the Recording Industry Association of America for shipments of one million copies in the United States.

== Background ==
Though less a soundtrack and more of a companion album, the Idlewild album features seven songs from the Idlewild film: "Chronomentrophobia", "Makes No Sense at All", "PJ and Rooster", "Mutron Angel", "Greatest Show on Earth", "When I Look in Your Eyes", and, from the end credits, "Morris Brown". Two snippets of film dialogue are also included on the album as interludes. The rest of the songs performed in the film were included on the earlier OutKast LPs Big Boi and Dre Present...Outkast and Speakerboxxx/The Love Below. In an interview for Billboard, Big Boi stated "This is an OutKast album. It isn't like a soundtrack where we go get this person or that person".

According to PopMatters critic Tim O'Neil, Idlewild's music was "not merely contemporary hip-hop, but a unique hybridization of modern hip-hop with vintage big-band jazz and Delta blues." Jess Harvell from Pitchfork observed imitations of hot jazz and jump blues songs throughout the record, while New York Post writer Dan Aquilante said the album mixed hip hop, jazz, blues, swing, and soul music, as OutKast "chronicled African American musical history with original tunes that transcend race and time".

== Release and reception ==
Professional ratings
Aggregate scores
Source	Rating
Metacritic	72/100
Review scores
Source	Rating
AllMusic	2.5/5 stars
The A.V. Club	B
Entertainment Weekly	B
The Guardian	4/5 stars
MSN Music (Consumer Guide)	A
NME	4/5 stars
Pitchfork	6.7/10
Rolling Stone	4/5 stars
Slant Magazine	3.5/5 stars
Spin	3/5 stars

Idlewild's release was delayed several times in 2005 before being released in 2006. In its first week, the album charted at number two on the Billboard 200 and sold 196,000 copies in the United States. The album dropped to the number seven in its second week, selling an additional 78,000 units. On September 26, 2006, it was certified platinum by the Recording Industry Association of America, having shipped one million copies in the US. In Canada, it was certified gold by the Canadian Recording Industry Association.

According to the review aggregator Metacritic, Idlewild received "generally favorable reviews" based on a weighted average score of 72 out of 100 from 30 critic scores. Q called it "a dazzling album", while Ben Williams of New York found it "entertaining and surprisingly consistent". The Guardian's Alexis Petridis wrote that it "bulges with brilliant ideas... Ambitious but flawed, at turns stunning, maddening and confusing". Rob Sheffield from Rolling Stone compared Idlewild to Prince's Parade (1986), while praising its "deeply eccentric richness" and calling it "so suave on the surface, it takes a few spins to absorb how radical it is". Although she felt it lacked cohesion and a "clear message", Ann Powers of the Los Angeles Times found the album "sonically challenging and lyrically wide-ranging", including songs for "contemplation and booty-shaking". Writing for MSN Music, Robert Christgau called Idlewild "a joyous mishmash" and praised each OutKast-member's distinct performance: "from the mainstream hip-hop Big Boi articulates with so much muscle to the retro swing Andre sings just fine, they sound happy to parade their mastery". Uncut described it as "Stylish and substantial, it's a deft masterpastiche that dissolves history for its own entertainment". Mojo stated, "Every time you think you've got Idlewild figured out, it zips off in a totally unexpected new direction".

According to NME critic Dan Martin, other critics might have found Idlewild to be "a bit long and uneven and self-indulgent". In a negative review for the Chicago Sun-Times, Jim DeRogatis viewed the album as unfocused and stated, "it's all about heavy-handed, faux Scott Joplin ragtime piano; showy but lame Cab Calloway horn arrangements; fake Rudy Vallee crooning (courtesy of Benjamin's nasal, off-key whine) and ultra-hammy vaudeville shucking and jiving". The Washington Post's J. Freedom du Lac noted a "creative schism" in the duo and wrote, "For all of its flashes of greatness – the brassy marching-band rap of 'Morris Brown', the psychedelic hip-hop flashback 'Train', the Stevie Wonder-inspired acoustic blues number 'Idlewild Blue (Don'tchu Worry 'Bout Me)' – the staggeringly eclectic 'Idlewild' includes too much filler and too many outright stink bombs to deserve a place alongside the best pop offerings of 2006, let alone 'Aquemini', et al". Preston Jones from Slant Magazine called it "frustrating, uneven, and strained ... an interesting failure". Spin magazine's Charles Aaron called it "a perplexing album", despite how it "grasps for a distinctive sound, departing almost entirely from rap per se" in favor of music from "the jazz/jump blues from the film's '30s/40's demimonde, as well as shades of Prince's most fitfully eclectic periods".

== Track listing ==
Idlewild track listing
No.	Title	Writer(s)	Producer(s)	Length
1.	"Intro"	André Benjamin; Antwan Patton	Outkast	2:12
2.	"Mighty 'O'"	Benjamin; Patton; Cab Calloway; Clarence Gaskill; Dave Robbins; Irving Mills; Patrick Brown; Ray Murray; Rico Wade	Organized Noize	4:16
3.	"Peaches" (featuring Sleepy Brown and Scar)	Patton; Marvin Parkman; Mike Hardnett; P. Brown; Preston Crump; Murray; Wade; Terrence Smith	Organized Noize	3:10
4.	"Idlewild Blue (Don'tchu Worry 'Bout Me)"	Benjamin	Benjamin	3:24
5.	"Infatuation (Interlude)"			0:48
6.	"N2U" (featuring Khujo)	Patton; Mike Patterson; P. Brown; Murray; Wade; Robert Manzoli; Wallace Khatib; Willie Knighton	Organized Noize	3:40
7.	"Morris Brown" (featuring Scar and Sleepy Brown)	Benjamin; Patton; T. Smith	Benjamin	4:24
8.	"Chronomentrophobia"	Benjamin	Benjamin	2:12
9.	"The Train" (featuring Sleepy Brown and Scar)	Patton; David Brown; Joi Gilliam; Kevin Kendricks; Myrna Crenshaw; P. Brown; T. Smith	Big Boi	4:09
10.	"Life Is Like a Musical"	Benjamin	Organized Noize	2:14
11.	"No Bootleg DVDs (Interlude)"			0:50
12.	"Hollywood Divorce" (featuring Lil Wayne and Snoop Dogg)	Benjamin; Patton; Calvin Broadus; Dwayne Carter	Benjamin	5:23
13.	"Zora (Interlude)"			0:16
14.	"Call the Law" (featuring Janelle Monáe)	Patton; Charles Joseph II; Janelle Robinson; Nathaniel Irvin III	Nate "Rocket" Wonder; Big Boi (co.); Chuck Lightning (co.); Janelle Monáe (co.)	4:51
15.	"Bamboo & Cross (Interlude)"			0:55
16.	"Buggface"	Patton; David Sheats; Jeminesse Smith	Jeminesse Smith; Mr. DJ	2:45
17.	"Makes No Sense at All"	Benjamin	Benjamin	2:53
18.	"In Your Dreams" (featuring Killer Mike and Janelle Monáe)	Patton; Robinson; P. Brown; Murray	Organized Noize	3:34
19.	"PJ & Rooster"	Benjamin; Patton	Benjamin	4:27
20.	"Mutron Angel" (featuring Whild Peach)	Patton; D. Brown; Crenshaw	Whild Peach	4:18
21.	"Greatest Show on Earth" (featuring Macy Gray)	Benjamin	Benjamin	3:06
22.	"You're Beautiful (Interlude)"			0:29
23.	"When I Look in Your Eyes"	Benjamin; Kendricks	Kevin Kendricks	2:43
24.	"Dyin' to Live"	Benjamin	Benjamin	2:07
25.	"A Bad Note"	Benjamin; Kendricks	Johnny Vulture (Note: In the album booklet, the producer for "A Bad Note" is listed as Johnny Vulture, which actually stands as a nickname for André 3000.)	8:47
Total length:				77:52

Sample credits

- "Mighty 'O" contains a portion of the composition "Minnie the Moocher" – written by Cab Calloway, Clarence Gaskill and Irving Mills – as performed by Cab Calloway.
- "Peaches" contains a sample from "Cuss Words" as performed by Too Short.
- "The Train", "Call the Law", "Buggface" and "PJ & Rooster" contain dialogue from the film Idlewild.

== Personnel ==
Credits for Idlewild adapted from AllMusic.

- Kory Aaron – assistant engineer
- Malik Albert – engineer, audio production
- Victor Alexander – drums
- Vincent Alexander – assistant engineer
- Kori Anders – engineer, assistant engineer, mixing assistant
- André 3000 – executive producer, guitars, piano, arranger, keyboards, programming, vocals, background vocals, producer, drum programming
- Bamboo – vocals
- Warren Bletcher – assistant engineer, mixing assistant
- Steven Boos – drums
- Jeff Bowden – keyboards
- Leslie Brathwaite – mixing
- David "Whild" Brown – background vocals
- Myrna "Peach" Brown – vocals
- Sleepy Brown – vocals, background vocals
- Ralph Cacciurri – engineer
- Chris Carmouche – engineer, mixing, audio production
- Preston Crump – bass
- Cutmaster Swift – scratching
- Regina Davenport – A&R
- Sean Davis – engineer, audio production
- Dookieblossumgame – vocals
- Tom Doty – mixing assistant
- Eddie Ellis – conductor
- Gary Fly – engineer, assistant engineer, mixing assistant
- Jerry Freeman – cornet, horn, horn arrangements
- John Frye – audio production, engineer, mixing
- Joi Gilliam – vocals, background vocals
- Macy Gray – vocals
- Bernie Grundman – mastering
- Robert Hannon – engineer, assistant engineer
- Mike Hardnett – guitar
- Tuesday Henderson – percussion
- John Holmes – engineer, assistant engineer, mixing assistant, audio production
- Aaron Holton – assistant engineer
- Hot Tub Tony – background vocals
- Josh Houghkirk – mixing assistant
- Chris Jackson – engineer
- Kevin Kendricks – piano, keyboards, horn arrangements, producer
- Debra Killings – bass, vocals, background vocals
- Chuck Lightning – arranger, producer
- Lil Wayne – vocals
- Ryan McDaniels – assistant engineer
- Janelle Monáe – arranger, vocals, background vocals, producer
- Morris Brown College Gospel Choir – instrumentation
- Vernon Mungo – engineer
- Christian Jones – guitar
- Wyatt Oates – assistant engineer
- Organized Noize – programming, producer, drum programming
- Marvin "Chanz" Parkman – keyboards
- Mike Patterson – bass, guitar
- Antwan Patton – executive producer
- Josh Phillips – assistant engineer
- Neil Pogue – mixing
- Chris Rakestraw – mixing assistant
- Dave Robbins – bass, keyboards
- Albey Scholl – harmonica
- Rob Skipworth – assistant engineer, mixing assistant
- Skreechy Peachy – vocals, background vocals
- Terry Smith – background vocals
- Snoop Dogg – vocals
- Matthew Still – audio production, engineer, assistant engineer
- Phil Tan – mixing
- Denise Trorman – art direction, design
- Uncoolgirlz Choir – background vocals
- Johnny Vulture – producer
- David Whild – guitar, background vocals
- Melissa Zampatti – vocals

== Chart positions ==
=== Weekly charts ===
Weekly chart performance for Idlewild
Chart (2006)	Peak position
Australian Albums (ARIA)	27
Austrian Albums (Ö3 Austria)	56
Belgian Albums (Ultratop Flanders)	24
Belgian Albums (Ultratop Wallonia)	84
Canadian Albums (Billboard)	6
Dutch Albums (Album Top 100)	32
Finnish Albums (Suomen virallinen lista)	20
French Albums (SNEP)	39
German Albums (Offizielle Top 100)	33
Irish Albums (IRMA)	19
Italian Albums (FIMI)	60
Japanese Albums (Oricon)	15
New Zealand Albums (RMNZ)	13
Norwegian Albums (VG-lista)	11
Scottish Albums (Official Charts)	23
Swedish Albums (Sverigetopplistan)	18
Swiss Albums (Schweizer Hitparade)	4
UK Albums (Official Charts)	16
UK R&B Albums (Official Charts)	2
US Billboard 200	2
US Top R&B/Hip-Hop Albums (Billboard)	1
US Top Rap Albums (Billboard)	1
US Soundtrack Albums (Billboard)	1

=== Year-end charts ===
Year-end chart performance for Idlewild
Chart (2006)	Position
US Billboard 200	146
US Soundtrack Albums (Billboard)	8
US Top R&B/Hip-Hop Albums (Billboard)	44

== Certifications ==
Certifications for Idlewild
Region	Certification	Certified units/sales
Canada (Music Canada)	Gold	50,000^{^}
United States (RIAA)	Platinum	1,000,000^{^}
^{^} Shipments figures based on certification alone.
