= Scooby-Doo (soundtrack) =

Scooby-Doo: Music from the Motion Picture

Soundtrack album by Various artists
- Released: June 4, 2002 (Audio CD and Compact Cassette)
- Genres: R&B; hip hop; pop punk; reggae fusion; alternative rock
- Length: 47:49
- Labels: Lava; Atlantic; WMG Soundtracks
- Producer: Various artists

Singles from Scooby-Doo: Music from the Motion Picture
- 1. "Land of a Million Drums" Released: July 4, 2002

Professional ratings
Review scores
Source	Rating
Allmusic	4/5 stars

Scooby-Doo: Music from the Motion Picture is the soundtrack to the 2002 film Scooby-Doo. It was released on June 4, 2002, by Lava Records, Atlantic Records and WMG Soundtracks on Audio CD and Compact Cassette and contained songs of various genres. The soundtrack fared well on the Billboard charts, peaking at number 24 on the Billboard 200, number 49 on the Top R&B/Hip-Hop Albums and number 4 on the Top Soundtracks.

== Track listing ==
Scooby-Doo: Music from the Motion Picture
No.	Title	Length
1.	"Shaggy, Where Are You?" (Shaggy)	3:35
2.	"Land of a Million Drums" (OutKast featuring Killer Mike and Sleepy Brown)	4:05
3.	"Lil Romeo's B House" (Lil' Romeo and Master P)	4:07
4.	"Thinking About You" (Solange Knowles featuring Murphy Lee)	4:02
5.	"Words to Me" (Sugar Ray)	4:02
6.	"Freaks Come Out at Night" (Uncle Kracker and Busta Rhymes)	4:03
7.	"Things That Go Bump in the Night" (Allstars)	3:02
8.	"Whenever You Feel Like It" (Kylie Minogue)	4:06
9.	"It's a Mystery" (Little-T and One Track Mike)	3:21
10.	"Scooby D" (Baha Men)	2:53
11.	"Man with the Hex" (The Atomic Fireballs)	3:01
12.	"Grow Up" (Simple Plan)	2:33
13.	"Scooby-Doo, Where Are You?" (MxPx)	1:29
14.	"Mystery Inc." (David Newman)	3:26
Total length:		47:49

== Year-end charts ==
Chart (2002)	Position
Canadian Alternative Albums (Nielsen SoundScan)	118
Canadian R&B Albums (Nielsen SoundScan)	68
