= Big Boi and Dre Present... Outkast =

Big Boi and Dre Present… Outkast

Compilation album by Outkast
- Released: December 4, 2001
- Recorded: 1993–2001
- Studios: Stankonia Recording (Atlanta, Georgia); DARP (Atlanta, Georgia)
- Genre: Hip-hop
- Length: 73:05
- Labels: LaFace; Arista
- Producers: Earthtone III; Organized Noize

Outkast chronology
Stankonia (2000)	Big Boi and Dre Present… Outkast (2001)	Speakerboxxx/The Love Below (2003)

Singles from Big Boi and Dre Present… Outkast
- 1. "The Whole World" Released: November 27, 2001

Professional ratings
Review scores
Source	Rating
AllMusic	4.5/5 stars
The New Rolling Stone Album Guide	3.5/5 stars
Now	4/5 Ns
RapReviews	8/10
Robert Christgau	B+

Big Boi and Dre Present… Outkast is the only compilation album by the American Southern hip-hop duo Outkast. It was released December 4, 2001 through LaFace and Arista Records.

The compilation is composed of four new tracks, including three new songs – "Funkin' Around", "The Whole World", and "Movin' Cool (The After Party)" – as well as five songs from Southernplayalisticadillacmuzik, one from ATLiens, and three each from Aquemini and Stankonia. Recording sessions took place at Stankonia Recording and DARP Studios in Atlanta, and production was handled by Earthtone III and Organized Noize. It features guest appearances from Goodie Mob, Joi, Killer Mike and Sleepy Brown.

The album peaked at number 18 on the Billboard 200 and number 4 on the Top R&B/Hip-Hop Albums in the United States. On March 6, 2002, it was certified Platinum by the Recording Industry Association of America for 1,000,000 copies sold in the US. It also made it to No. 25 in New Zealand and No. 78 in Germany. In 2021, the album received Silver certification by the British Phonographic Industry for selling 60,000 units in the UK. Its lead single, "The Whole World", was charted in several countries and won a Grammy Award for Best Rap Performance by a Duo or Group in 2003.

== Background ==
Although the compilation encompasses several hit songs from the duo, Big Boi and André 3000 do not consider it to be a "greatest hits" or "best-of" release. Big Boi described the album as "more like a refresher course… summer school on Outkast 101", and stated "[we're] just letting all the fans that went and got Stankonia know that there were three albums that came out before that. We picked some of the favourite songs from all the albums [for the compilation]." André added, "After the Stankonia album, we gained a lot of new fans. They didn't know about Southernplayalistic, ATLiens, Aquemini. We had to give them the beginning [sic] to let them know where we're at right now".

The title track from ATLiens is mentioned as being included on the compilation in the essay contained in the booklet, but it is not actually featured; It is assumed it was dropped at a late stage of the album's production.

== Track listing ==
Big Boi and Dre Present... Outkast track listing
No.	Title	Writer(s)	Producer(s)	Length
1.	"Intro"	André Benjamin; Antwan Patton; Patrick Brown; David Sheats	Earthtone III	1:07
2.	"Funkin' Around" (featuring Sleepy Brown)	Benjamin; Patton; Brown; Sheats	Earthtone III	4:34
3.	"Ain't No Thang" (from Southernplayalisticadillacmuzik)	Benjamin; Patton; Brown; Rico Wade; Ray Murray	Organized Noize	5:39
4.	"So Fresh, So Clean" (from Stankonia)	Benjamin; Patton; Brown; Wade; Murray	Organized Noize	4:02
5.	"Rosa Parks" (from Aquemini)	Benjamin; Patton	Outkast	3:57
6.	"The Whole World" (featuring Killer Mike)	Benjamin; Patton; Michael Render; Sheats	Earthtone III	4:55
7.	"Aquemini" (from Aquemini)	Benjamin; Patton	Outkast	4:42
8.	"B.O.B." (from Stankonia)	Benjamin; Patton; Sheats	Earthtone III	4:38
9.	"Southernplayalisticadillacmuzik" (from Southernplayalisticadillacmuzik)	Benjamin; Patton; Brown; Wade; Murray	Organized Noize	4:11
10.	"Crumblin' Erb" (from Southernplayalisticadillacmuzik)	Benjamin; Patton; Brown; Wade; Murray	Organized Noize	5:17
11.	"Ms. Jackson" (from Stankonia)	Benjamin; Patton; Sheats	Earthtone III	3:59
12.	"Player's Ball" (from Southernplayalisticadillacmuzik)	Benjamin; Patton; Brown; Wade; Murray	Organized Noize	4:23
13.	"Elevators (Me & You)" (from ATLiens)	Benjamin; Patton	Outkast	4:18
14.	"SpottieOttieDopaliscious" (from Aquemini)	Benjamin; Patton; Brown	Outkast	5:58
15.	"Git Up, Git Out" (featuring Goodie Mob; from Southernplayalisticadillacmuzik)	Benjamin; Patton; Cameron Gipp; Thomas Callaway; Brown; Wade; Murray	Organized Noize	7:26
16.	"Movin' Cool (The After Party)" (featuring Joi)	Benjamin; Patton; Joi Gilliam-Gipp; Sheats	Earthtone III	3:59
Total length:				73:05

Notes

- The tracks "Ain't No Thang", "Rosa Parks", "Aquemini", "B.O.B.", "Southernplayalisticadillacmuzik", "Ms. Jackson", "SpottieOttieDopaliscious" and "Git Up, Git Out" differ from the album versions.

== Personnel ==
- André Benjamin – vocals, keyboards (track 2), horns arrangement (tracks: 2, 16), producer (tracks: 1, 2, 5–8, 11, 13, 14, 16), executive producer
- Antwan "Big Boi" Patton – vocals, keyboards (track 2), horns arrangement (tracks: 2, 16), producer (tracks: 1, 2, 5–8, 11, 13, 14, 16), executive producer
- Patrick "Sleepy" Brown – vocals (track 2), producer (tracks: 3, 4, 9, 10, 12, 15)
- Michael "Killer Mike' Render – rap vocals (track 6)
- Joi Gilliam-Gipp – additional vocals (track 6), vocals (track 16)
- Myrna "Screechy Peach" Crenshaw – additional vocals (track 6)
- Cameron Gipp – vocals (track 15)
- Thomas "CeeLo Green" Callaway – vocals (track 15)
- Aaron Mills – bass (tracks: 2, 6, 16)
- David "Mr. DJ" Sheats – keyboards (track 2), horns arrangement (tracks: 2, 16), producer (tracks: 1, 2, 5–8, 11, 13, 14, 16), executive producer
- Jason Freeman – horns (tracks: 2, 6, 16), horns arrangement (tracks: 2, 16)
- Jerry Freeman – horns (tracks: 2, 6, 16), horns arrangement (tracks: 2, 16)
- Darian Emory – horns (tracks: 2, 6, 16)
- Leonard Julian – horns (tracks: 2, 6, 16)
- Matt Still – keyboards (track 6)
- Kevin Kendrick – keyboards (track 16)
- Rico Wade – producer (tracks: 3, 4, 9, 10, 12, 15)
- Ray Murray – producer (tracks: 3, 4, 9, 10, 12, 15)
- John Frye – recording, mixing
- Vincent Alexander – recording assistant, mixing assistant
- Richard "Segal" Huredia – mixing
- Warren Bletcher – mixing assistant
- Bernie Grundman – mastering
- Antonio "L.A." Reid – executive producer
- Jeff Schulz – design
- Joseph Cultice – photography
- Joe Mama-Nitzberg – creative director

== Charts ==
=== Weekly charts ===
Weekly chart performance for Big Boi and Dre Present... Outkast
Chart (2001–2002)	Peak position
German Albums (Offizielle Top 100)	78
New Zealand Albums (RMNZ)	25
UK Albums (Official Charts)	167
UK R&B Albums (Official Charts)	25
US Billboard 200	18
US Top R&B/Hip-Hop Albums (Billboard)	4

=== Year-end charts ===
Year-end chart performance for Big Boi and Dre Present... Outkast
Chart (2002)	Position
Canadian Alternative Albums (Nielsen SoundScan)	103
Canadian R&B Albums (Nielsen SoundScan)	53
Canadian Rap Albums (Nielsen SoundScan)	28
US Billboard 200	57
US Top R&B/Hip-Hop Albums (Billboard)	23

== Certifications ==
Certifications from Big Boi and Dre Present... Outkast
Region	Certification	Certified units/sales
New Zealand (RMNZ)	Platinum	15,000^{‡}
United Kingdom (BPI)	Silver	60,000^{‡}
United States (RIAA)	Platinum	1,000,000^{^}
^{^} Shipments figures based on certification alone.^{‡} Sales+streaming figures based on certification alone.
