= Morris Brown (song) =

Single by OutKast featuring Scar, Sleepy Brown and Janelle Monae

from the album Idlewild
- B-side: "Mighty 'O'"
- Released: August 15, 2006
- Recorded: 2005–2006
- Genre: Hip hop
- Length: 4:24
- Label: Sony BMG/Zomba Records/LaFace Records
- Songwriter(s): Andre Benjamin, Antwan Patton, T. Smith
- Producer(s): André 3000

OutKast singles chronology
| "Mighty 'O'" (2006) | "Morris Brown" (2006) | "Idlewild Blue (Don'tchu Worry 'Bout Me)" (2006) |

Sleepy Brown singles chronology
| "Margarita" (2006) | "Morris Brown" (2006) |

Music video
- "Morris Brown" on YouTube

"Morris Brown" is the second single from OutKast's sixth studio album, Idlewild. The song features guest vocals from Scar and Sleepy Brown, along with Janelle Monae, who lends her voice in the hook and on Sleepy Brown's verse. It is named after Morris Brown College and features the Morris Brown College Marching Wolverines. André 3000 produced the song, but does not appear on the track. The song was produced during the recording of the Stankonia tracks, but was not released. The single peaked at #43 in the UK, and peaked at #95 on the Billboard Hot 100 chart.

== Track listings ==
UK CD1

1. "Morris Brown" – 4:25
2. "Mighty 'O'" – 4:16

UK CD2

1. "Morris Brown" (clean version) – 4:25
2. "Morris Brown" (dirty version) – 4:25
3. "Morris Brown" (instrumental) – 4:25

10" limited edition vinyl single

1. "Morris Brown" – 4:25
2. "Idlewild Blue (Don'tchu Worry 'Bout Me)" – 4:15

12" vinyl single

1. "Morris Brown" (clean version) – 4:25
2. "Morris Brown" (clean instrumental) – 4:25
3. "Morris Brown" (main version) – 4:25
4. "Morris Brown" (main instrumental) – 4:25

== Charts ==
| Chart (2006) | Peak position |
|---|---|
| Finland (Suomen virallinen lista) | 12 |
| Germany (GfK) | 98 |
| Ireland (IRMA) | 39 |
| New Zealand (Recorded Music NZ) | 32 |
| Switzerland (Schweizer Hitparade) | 57 |
| UK Singles (OCC) | 43 |
| US Billboard Hot 100 | 95 |
| US Billboard Pop 100 | 76 |
| US Billboard Bubbling Under R&B/Hip-Hop Singles | 2 |
