= Land of a Million Drums =

Single by OutKast featuring Killer Mike and Sleepy Brown

from the album Scooby-Doo: Music from the Motion Picture
- Released: July 4, 2002
- Recorded: 2001
- Length: 4:05
- Label: Arista
- Songwriters: Andre Benjamin; Patrick L. Brown; Antwan Patton; Michael Render; David Sheats
- Producer: Earthtone III

OutKast singles chronology
"The Whole World" (2001)	"Our Lips Are Sealed" (2002)	"GhettoMusick" (2003)

Scooby-Doo singles chronology
"Land of a Million Drums" (2002)	"Don't Wanna Think About You" (2004)

"Land of a Million Drums" is a song by the American hip-hop duo OutKast featuring Killer Mike and Sleepy Brown, released on July 4, 2002. It is one of two non-album singles to be released by the duo (the other being the promotional single "In Due Time"). The song was featured on the soundtrack of the first live-action Scooby-Doo film.

The single was well-received in the United Kingdom, where it reached the 46th position on the 2002 singles charts. However, the song was not as successful in the United States, where it failed to chart. In 2013, Al Shipley of Complex included it on his list of "20 Horrible Songs Made By Great Rappers".

There is no fully uncensored version of this song. The version credited as the "Explicit Version" on both the CD singles and the 12 inch vinyl, that both carry a Parental Advisory sticker, is still partially censored and have the Scooby-Doo sound effects removed.

== Track listings ==
=== UK single ===
UK CD single
No.	Title	Length
1.	"Land of a Million Drums" (Radio version)	4:04
2.	"Land of a Million Drums" (Explicit version)	4:04
3.	"It's a Mystery" (featuring Little T. and One Track Mike)	3:02
4.	"Land of a Million Drums" (Video)	4:24
Total length:		15:34

=== EU single ===
European CD single
No.	Title	Length
1.	"Land of a Million Drums" (Simon Vegas remix)	3:52
2.	"Land of a Million Drums" (BuGHEE remix)	3:53
Total length:		7:45

=== 12" single ===
Side A
No.	Title	Length
1.	"Land of a Million Drums" (Radio version)	4:04
2.	"Land of a Million Drums" (Explicit version)	4:04

Side B
No.	Title	Length
1.	"Land of a Million Drums" (Instrumental)	4:04
Total length:		12:12

== Charts ==
Chart (2002)	Peak position
Germany (GfK)	59
Sweden (Sverigetopplistan)	49
UK Singles (Official Charts)	46
