= Mighty O =

"Mighty 'O'"

Single by OutKast

from the album Idlewild
- Released: June 6, 2006
- Recorded: 2005
- Length: 4:16
- Label: Sony BMG; Zomba; LaFace
- Songwriters: André Benjamin; Patrick L. Brown; Cab Calloway; Clarence Gaskill; Irving Mills; Raymon Ameer Murray; Antwan Patton; David Joseph Robbins; Rico Renard Wade
- Producer: Organized Noize Productions

OutKast singles chronology
"Prototype" (2004)	"Mighty 'O'" (2006)	"Morris Brown" (2006)

"Mighty 'O'" (also written "Mighty "O"", and without apostrophes around the O, as "Mighty O") is the first single from OutKast's sixth studio album, Idlewild, released on June 6, 2006. The single was only released in the United States, and is one of only three songs from the album in which both members of OutKast appear together. The other two are "Hollywood Divorce" and "PJ & Rooster". The single peaked at number 77 on the Billboard Hot 100 chart. The song contains a prominent sample of Cab Calloway's "Minnie the Moocher", written by Calloway, Clarence Gaskill and Irving Mills.

== Track listings ==
UK CD single

1. "Mighty 'O'" (clean version) – 4:16
2. "Mighty 'O'" (main version) – 4:16
3. "Mighty 'O'" (instrumental) – 4:16

12" vinyl single

1. "Mighty 'O'" (main version) – 4:16
2. "Mighty 'O'" (main instrumental) – 4:16
3. "Mighty 'O'" (clean version) – 4:16
4. "Mighty 'O'" (clean instrumental) – 4:16

== Charts ==
"Mighty O" debuted and peaked at number 77 on the Billboard Hot 100 the week of June 24, 2006. It dropped to number 89 the week after and left the chart completely.

Chart (2006)	Peak position
Czech Republic Airplay (ČNS IFPI)	54
Russia (Airplay Chart)	67
US Billboard Hot 100	77
US Hot R&B/Hip-Hop Songs (Billboard)	30
US Hot Rap Songs (Billboard)	18
