= Idlewild Blue (Don'tchu Worry 'Bout Me) =

Single by OutKast

from the album Idlewild
- B-side: "She Lives in My Lap"
- Released: 2006
- Genre: Blues
- Length: 3:24
- Label: Sony BMG/Zomba Records/LaFace Records
- Songwriter(s): André Benjamin
- Producer(s): André 3000

OutKast singles chronology
| "Morris Brown" (2006) | "Idlewild Blue (Don'tchu Worry 'Bout Me)" (2006) | "Hollywood Divorce" (2006) |

Music video
- "Idlewild Blue (Don'tchu Worry 'Bout Me)" on YouTube

"Idlewild Blue (Don'tchu Worry 'Bout Me)" is the third single released from American musical duo OutKast's sixth studio album, Idlewild, and the first from the album that is sung by André 3000. Andre also plays the guitar for the song, using the standard 12-bar blues. The song tells the story of a character wishing to gain his independence by leaving the familiarity of his family, friends and town. The video shows Andre and the band playing in an old house during a thunder storm, with people dancing around him. The building slowly fills with rain water, and by the end of the video, everything in the house is underwater. Because of the proximity in which the video was filmed, some viewers interpret the video to be a visual allusion to the New Orleans flooding following Hurricane Katrina, while others think the water represents the "blues" that can flood over someone's life. The end of the video features a text that reads, "Dedicated to all those tryin' to stay afloat."

== Recording ==
André 3000 wrote the song during the shooting of Four Brothers.

== Track listings ==
CD single

1. "Idlewild Blue (Don'tchu Worry 'Bout Me)" – 3:24
2. "She Lives in My Lap" (featuring Rosario Dawson) – 4:29

Promo

1. "Idlewild Blue (Don'tchu Worry 'Bout Me)" (main version) – 3:24
2. "Idlewild Blue (Don'tchu Worry 'Bout Me)" (clean version) – 3:24
3. "Idlewild Blue (Don'tchu Worry 'Bout Me)" (instrumental) – 3:24

== Charts ==
Weekly chart positions for "Idlewild Blue (Don'tchu Worry 'Bout Me)"
| Chart (2006) | Peak position |
|---|---|
| Romania (Romanian Top 100) | 71 |
| US Billboard Hot 100 | 100 |
| US Pop 100 (Billboard) | 80 |
