= The Whole World =

2001 single by Outkast

Single by OutKast featuring Killer Mike and Joi

from the album Big Boi and Dre Present... Outkast
- B-side: "Rosa Parks"; "B.O.B"
- Released: November 20, 2001
- Length: 4:55
- Label: LaFace; Arista
- Songwriter: Outkast
- Producer: Earthtone III

OutKast singles chronology
"So Fresh, So Clean" (2001)	"The Whole World" (2001)	"Land of a Million Drums" (2002)

Music video
- "The Whole World" on YouTube

"The Whole World" is the only single released from American hip hop duo Outkast's first compilation album, Big Boi and Dre Present... Outkast (2001). The song was written by Outkast, produced by Earthtone III, and features Killer Mike and Joi. Upon its release as a single in November 2001, "The Whole World" peaked at number 19 on both the US Billboard Hot 100 and the UK Singles Chart. The song won the 2003 Grammy Award for Best Rap Performance by a Duo or Group.

== Track listings ==
US 12-inch single

1. "The Whole World" (radio edit) – 4:21
2. "The Whole World" (instrumental) – 4:54
3. "The Whole World" (club mix) – 4:57
4. "The Whole World" (a cappella) – 4:23

UK CD single

1. "The Whole World" (featuring Killer Mike) – 4:21
2. "Rosa Parks" – 5:24
3. "B.O.B" – 4:18
4. "The Whole World" (video)

UK cassette single and European CD single

1. "The Whole World" (featuring Killer Mike) – 4:21
2. "Rosa Parks" – 5:24

UK 12-inch single

A1. "The Whole World" (featuring Killer Mike) – 4:21
A2. "Rosa Parks" – 5:24
B1. "The Whole World" (instrumental) – 4:21

Australian and New Zealand CD single

1. "The Whole World" (featuring Killer Mike) – 4:21
2. "Rosa Parks" – 5:24
3. "B.O.B" – 5:04
4. "The Whole World" (instrumental) – 4:54

== Charts ==
=== Weekly charts ===
Chart (2002)	Peak position
Australia (ARIA)	95
Australian Urban (ARIA)	20
Austria (Ö3 Austria Top 40)	52
Belgium (Ultratip Bubbling Under Flanders)	9
Belgium (Ultratip Bubbling Under Wallonia)	4
Europe (Eurochart Hot 100)	95
Germany (GfK)	30
Ireland (IRMA)	24
Netherlands (Dutch Top 40)	30
Netherlands (Single Top 100)	39
New Zealand (Recorded Music NZ)	4
Scotland Singles (Official Charts)	22
Sweden (Sverigetopplistan)	26
Switzerland (Schweizer Hitparade)	79
UK Singles (Official Charts)	19
UK Hip Hop/R&B (Official Charts)	4
US Billboard Hot 100	19
US Hot R&B/Hip-Hop Songs (Billboard)	8
US Hot Rap Songs (Billboard)	21
US Pop Airplay (Billboard)	23
US Rhythmic Airplay (Billboard)	6

=== Year-end charts ===
Chart (2002)	Position
US Billboard Hot 100	70
US Hot R&B/Hip-Hop Singles & Tracks (Billboard)	51
US Hot Rap Tracks (Billboard)	21
US Mainstream Top 40 (Billboard)	99
US Rhythmic Top 40 (Billboard)	26

== Certifications ==
Region	Certification	Certified units/sales
United States (RIAA)	Gold	500,000^{‡}
^{‡} Sales+streaming figures based on certification alone.

== Release history ==
Region	Date	Format(s)	Label(s)	Ref.
United States	November 20, 2001	Urban radio	LaFace; Arista	
Denmark	January 21, 2002	CD	LaFace; Arista	
Sweden	January 21, 2002	CD	LaFace; Arista	
United States	January 28, 2002	Contemporary hit radio	LaFace; Arista	
Australia	March 11, 2002	CD	LaFace; Arista	
United Kingdom	March 25, 2002	12-inch vinyl; CD; cassette	LaFace; Arista	
