= So Fresh, So Clean =

2001 single by Outkast

Single by Outkast

from the album Stankonia
- B-side: "Gangsta Sh*t"
- Released: March 13, 2001
- Genre: Hip-hop
- Length: 4:00
- Label: LaFace; Arista
- Songwriters: Andre Benjamin; Antwan Patton; David Sheats
- Producer: Organized Noize

Outkast singles chronology
"Ms. Jackson" (2000)	"So Fresh, So Clean" (2001)	"The Whole World" (2001)

Audio sample
- file; help

Music video
- "So Fresh, So Clean" on YouTube

"So Fresh, So Clean" is a song by American hip-hop duo Outkast from their fourth studio album, Stankonia (2000). It was produced by longtime collaborators Organized Noize. The song features the group using a rap-singing style and boasting about their appearances. It reached number 30 on the US Billboard Hot 100 chart and was certified platinum by the Recording Industry Association of America (RIAA) in October 2020.

== Samples ==
The song prominently features a sample from Joe Simon's "Before the Night Is Over". The song also features a sample from Funkadelic's "I'll Stay".

== Chart performance ==
"So Fresh, So Clean" debuted at number 71 on the US Billboard Hot 100 chart dated March 3, 2001. The song eventually reached it peak at number 30 on the chart dated May 5, 2001. On October 8, 2020, the single was certified platinum by the Recording Industry Association of America (RIAA) for combined sales and streaming equivalent units of over a million units in the United States.

== Music video ==
The music video features the duo and Sleepy Brown performing on a variety of CGI backgrounds, a beauty parlor, and a church. Ludacris, Slimm Calhoun, Chilli of TLC and members of Goodie Mob make cameo appearances in the video.

== Remix ==
The official remix, "So Fresh, So Clean (Stankonia Remix)" features Snoop Dogg and Sleepy Brown. It appeared on the soundtrack of Snoop Dogg's movie Bones under the name "Fresh and Clean (Remix)".

== Track listings ==
US maxi-CD single

1. "So Fresh, So Clean" (radio edit) – 4:05
2. "So Fresh, So Clean" (club mix) – 4:04
3. "So Fresh, So Clean" (instrumental) – 4:04
4. "So Fresh, So Clean" (Stankonia remix club mix featuring Snoop Dogg and Sleepy Brown) – 4:37
5. "So Fresh, So Clean" (Stankonia remix instrumental) – 4:39

US 12-inch single

A1. "So Fresh, So Clean" (radio edit) – 4:06
A2. "So Fresh, So Clean" (club mix) – 4:06
A3. "So Fresh, So Clean" (instrumental) – 4:04
B1. "Gangsta Sh*t" (club mix) – 4:44
B2. "Gangsta Sh*t" (instrumental) – 4:43

UK CD single

1. "So Fresh, So Clean" (radio edit) – 4:06
2. "So Fresh, So Clean" (Fatboy Slim remix) – 5:48
3. "Ms. Jackson" (Mr. Drunk mix) – 4:45

UK 12-inch single

A1. "So Fresh, So Clean" (album version) – 4:06
A2. "So Fresh, So Clean" (Fatboy Slim remix) – 5:48
B1. "So Fresh, So Clean" (instrumental) – 4:04

UK cassette single

1. "So Fresh, So Clean" (radio edit) – 4:06
2. "So Fresh, So Clean" (Fatboy Slim remix) – 5:48

European CD single

1. "So Fresh, So Clean" (radio mix) – 4:06
2. "So Fresh, So Clean" (instrumental) – 4:04

Australian CD single

1. "So Fresh, So Clean" (radio mix) – 4:06
2. "So Fresh, So Clean" (Fatboy Slim remix) – 5:48
3. "Ms. Jackson" (Mr. Drunk Remix) – 4:45
4. "So Fresh, So Clean" (instrumental) – 4:04

== Charts ==
=== Weekly charts ===
Chart (2001)	Peak position
Australia (ARIA)	46
Australian Urban (ARIA)	15
Austria (Ö3 Austria Top 40)	45
Belgium (Ultratip Bubbling Under Flanders)	6
Belgium (Ultratip Bubbling Under Wallonia)	5
Europe (Eurochart Hot 100)	43
Germany (GfK)	42
Ireland (IRMA)	34
Netherlands (Dutch Top 40)	40
Netherlands (Single Top 100)	62
New Zealand (Recorded Music NZ)	46
Scottish Singles Sales (Official Charts)	35
Sweden (Sverigetopplistan)	47
Switzerland (Schweizer Hitparade)	41
UK Singles (Official Charts)	16
UK Dance (Official Charts)	7
UK Hip Hop/R&B (Official Charts)	10
US Billboard Hot 100	30
US Hot R&B/Hip-Hop Songs (Billboard)	10
US Hot Rap Songs (Billboard)	13
US Rhythmic Airplay (Billboard)	10

=== Year-end charts ===
Chart (2001)	Position
US Billboard Hot 100	94
US Hot R&B/Hip-Hop Singles & Tracks (Billboard)	32
US Rhythmic Top 40 (Billboard)	48

== Certifications ==
Region	Certification	Certified units/sales
Australia (ARIA)	Gold	35,000^{‡}
New Zealand (RMNZ)	2× Platinum	60,000^{‡}
United Kingdom (BPI)	Gold	400,000^{‡}
United States (RIAA)	2× Platinum	2,000,000^{‡}
^{‡} Sales+streaming figures based on certification alone.

== Release history ==
Region	Date	Format(s)	Label(s)	Ref.
United States	March 13, 2001	12-inch vinyl	LaFace; Arista	
Australia	May 28, 2001	CD	LaFace; Arista	
Sweden	May 28, 2001	CD	LaFace; Arista	
United Kingdom	May 28, 2001	12-inch vinyl; CD; cassette	LaFace; Arista	
