= Rosa Parks (song) =

Single by Outkast

from the album Aquemini
- Released: March 23, 1999
- Recorded: 1997
- Genre: Alternative hip-hop
- Length: 5:24 (album version); 4:08 (radio version)
- Label: LaFace; Arista; RCA
- Songwriters: Andre Benjamin; Antwan Patton
- Producer: Outkast

Outkast singles chronology
"Watch for the Hook" (1998)	"Rosa Parks" (1999)	"Da Art of Storytellin' (Pt. 1)" (1999)

Music video
- "Rosa Parks" on YouTube

"Rosa Parks" is a song by the hip hop duo Outkast. It was released as the second single from their album Aquemini (1998), and was that album's most successful single. The song's title comes from the civil rights movement activist Rosa Parks.

== Track listing ==
CD Single

1. "Rosa Parks" (Radio Version) – 4:08
2. "Rosa Parks" (Instrumental) – 4:27
3. "Skew It On The Bar-B" (Feat. Raekwon Of Wu Tang Clan) – 3:23

12" Vinyl Single

1. "Rosa Parks" (Radio Version) – 4:08
2. "Rosa Parks" (Instrumental) – 4:27
3. "Rosa Parks" (Main Version) – 4:27
4. "Rosa Parks" (Acapella) – 4:25

== Chart performance ==
"Rosa Parks" was a minor success on the Billboard Hot 100, peaking at No. 55. The single also charted on the Hot R&B/Hip-Hop Songs chart, peaking at No. 19. The single's highest chart position was at No. 9 on the Rhythmic Top 40.

Chart (1998–1999)	Peak position
Germany (GfK)	57
Netherlands (Dutch Top 40)	29
Netherlands (Single Top 100)	28
US Billboard Hot 100	55
US Billboard Hot R&B/Hip-Hop Songs	19
US Rhythmic Airplay (Billboard)	9

== Certifications ==
Region	Certification	Certified units/sales
New Zealand (RMNZ)	Gold	15,000^{‡}
United States (RIAA)	Platinum	1,000,000^{‡}
^{‡} Sales+streaming figures based on certification alone.

== Critical reception ==
"Rosa Parks" is widely considered one of Outkast's best songs. In 2020, The Ringer ranked the song number eight on their list of the 50 greatest Outkast songs, and in 2021, The Guardian ranked the song number two on their list of the 20 greatest Outkast songs.

The song was nominated for Best Rap Performance at the 41st Annual Grammy Awards in 1999.

== Music video ==
The music video, which was directed by Gregory Dark, filmed the parade scene in front of the Atlanta nightclub The Royal Peacock. The marching band is from Morris Brown College, and its gospel choir is featured on "Bombs Over Baghdad." The harmonica player in the song, and also appearing in the video in that part of the song, is Andre's stepfather Rev. Robert Hodo.

== Lawsuit ==
In 1999, Rosa Parks sued OutKast and LaFace Records over the song. The lawsuit alleged that the song misappropriated Parks' name and that Parks objected to some of the song's vulgar language.

Parks argued that there was insufficient artistic connection between the song's title, which appropriated her name, and its content because the song's lyrics did not reference Parks biographically, metaphorically, or symbolically. Specifically, Parks argued that the song's lyrics meant, "[b]e quiet and stop the commotion. OutKast is coming back out [with new music] so all other MCs [mic checkers, rappers, Master of Ceremonies] step aside. Do you want to ride and hang out with us? OutKast is the type of group to make the clubs get hyped-up/excited." The initial lawsuit was dismissed. Parks' representation hired lawyer Johnnie Cochran to appeal the decision in 2001, but the appeal was denied on First Amendment grounds. In 2003, the Supreme Court allowed Parks' lawyers to proceed with the lawsuit.

In 2004, the judge in the case appointed an impartial representative for Parks after her family expressed concerns that her caretakers and her lawyers were pursuing the case based on their own financial interest. Later that same year, the members of OutKast were dropped as co-defendants, and Parks' lawyers continued to seek action against LaFace and parent company BMG. In 2003, André told United Kingdom journalist Angus Batey that, following a Detroit concert in the midst of the legal battle, relatives of Parks had approached him and implied that the case was less to do with Rosa than with the lawyers.

The suit was finally settled on April 14, 2005; in the settlement agreement, OutKast and their producer and record labels paid Parks an undisclosed cash settlement and agreed to work with the Rosa and Raymond Parks Institute for Self Development in creating educational programs about the life of Rosa Parks. Parks died in October of that year, just six months following the settlement.

== Use in media ==
The song was used in the soundtracks for the video game NBA 2K17 and Watch Dogs 2, as well as in episode five of the 2020 documentary series The Last Dance.
