= Sleepy Brown =

American singer and record producer (born 1970)

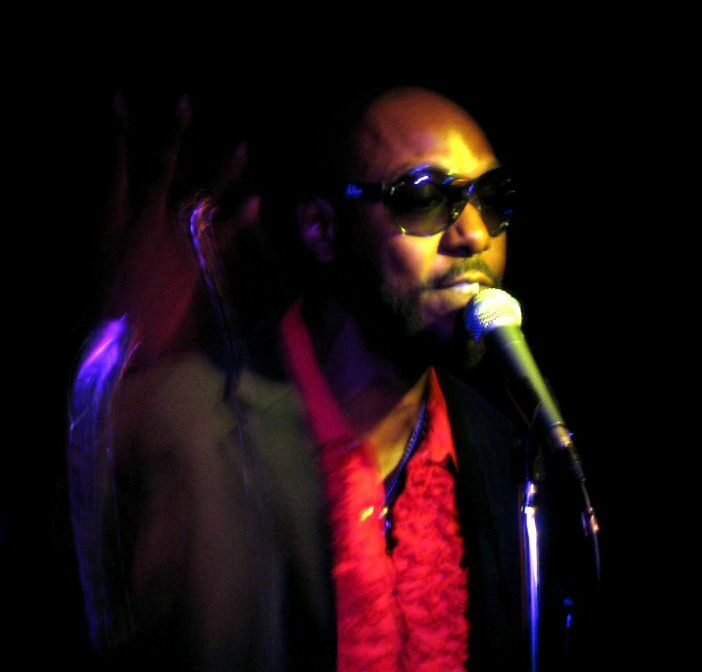
- Brown performing in 2006

Background information
- Born: Patrick Leroy Brown; January 24, 1970 (age 56)
- Origin: Savannah, Georgia, U.S.
- Genres: Hip-hop; R&B; soul; neo soul
- Occupations: Singer; songwriter; record producer
- Years active: 1992–present
- Labels: Virgin; EMI; Purple Ribbon
- Member of: Dungeon Family; Organized Noize
- Website: sleepybrown.com

Patrick Leroy "Sleepy" Brown (born January 24, 1970) is an American singer-songwriter and record producer. He is one-third of the Atlanta-based production team of Organized Noize, which has created hits for acts such as Outkast, Goodie Mob and TLC. TLC's "Waterfalls", penned by Brown and Organized Noize's Rico Wade and Ray Murray, was a #1 hit single on Billboard's Hot 100 in the summer of 1995.

== Career ==
Brown was born in Savannah, Georgia on January 24, 1970.

Besides production work Brown records as an artist himself, both for his own recordings (including his 2004 single "I Can't Wait" from the Barbershop 2: Back in Business film soundtrack) and on songs with collaborators such as Beyoncé and Big Boi (on the latter's US No. 1 and UK No. 7 hit "The Way You Move"). Brown independently released his debut solo album, Sleepy's Theme–The Vinyl Room in 1998. He was slated to release an album on the DreamWorks Records label called 'For the Grown and Sexy', but the release was scrapped when DreamWorks label folded.

He is signed to Big Boi's label Purple Ribbon Records and released his second album, Mr. Brown on October 3, 2006.

Brown is the son of Jimmy Brown, the lead vocalist and saxophonist for the 1970s funk band Brick.

== Discography ==
=== Albums ===
- Society of Soul – Brainchild (1995)
- Sleepy's Theme – The Vinyl Room (1998)
- Phunk-O-Naut (2004) unreleased
- Mr. Brown (2006)
- Sex, Drugs, & Soul (2012) unreleased
- The Big Sleepover (with Big Boi) (2021)

=== Singles ===
- 2004: "I Can't Wait" (US No. 40, US R&B #18)
- 2006: "Margarita" (feat. Big Boi & Pharrell Williams) (US #108)

Featured singles

- 2002: "Saturday (Oooh! Ooooh!)" (Ludacris featuring Sleepy Brown) (US No. 22, US R&B No. 10, US Rap No. 5, UK #31)
- 2002: "Land of a Million Drums" (Outkast featuring Killer Mike and Sleepy Brown) (US R&B No. 116, UK #46)
- 2003: "A.D.I.D.A.S." (Killer Mike featuring Big Boi & Sleepy Brown) (US No. 60, US R&B No. 42, US Rap No. 20, UK #22)
- 2003: "The Way You Move" (Outkast featuring Sleepy Brown) (US No. 1, US Pop No. 1, US R&B No. 2, US Rap No. 1, UK #7)
- 2005: "The Otherside" (Bubba Sparxxx featuring Petey Pablo and Sleepy Brown)
- 2006: "Morris Brown" (Outkast featuring Scar and Sleepy Brown) (US No. 95, US R&B No. 102, UK #43)
- 2024: "High Rise" (Sleepy Brown featuring Snoop Dogg)

=== Select guest appearances ===
(excluding songs with the Dungeon Family)

- 2Pac – "Hennessy" (Red Spyda Remix) (with E.D.I. Mean)
- Beyoncé – "Hip-Hop Star" (with Big Boi)
- Bow Wow – "Crazy" (with Da Brat)
- Da BackWudz – "Mama Always Told Me"
- Earth, Wind & Fire – "This Is How I Feel" (with Big Boi and Kelly Rowland)
- Field Mob – "Nothing 2 Lose" (with Slimm Calhoun)
- Freeway – "Some Say Yes"
- Freeway – "Some Say Yes" (remix) (with Fabolous)
- Jayo Felony – "So into You"
- Jay-Z – "Poppin Tags" (with Killer Mike, Twista, Big Boi and Debra Killings)
- Journalist – "Back of Da Lack" (with Backbone A.K.A. Mr. Fat Face 100 of Dungeon Family)
- Kurupt – "Starstruck" (with Cool Breeze, Big Rube and Big Gipp)
- Ludacris – "Blueberry Yum Yum"
- Ludacris – "Saturday (Oooh! Ooooh!)"
- Murphy Lee – "Luv Me Baby" (with Jazze Pha)
- Prozack Turner – "American Giant"
- Prozack Turner – "El Chepa"
- Sly and the Family Stone – "Runnin Away" (with Big Boi and Killer Mike)
- Stacie Orrico – "Knock 'Em Out"
- Styles P – "Watch Ya Self"
- T.I. – "We Pimpin'"
- UGK – "Swishas and Erb"
- UGK – "Shattered Dreams"

=== With Dungeon Family ===
- Big Boi – "808" (with Bun B, Big Gee and G-Rock)
- Big Gipp – "Steppin Out"
- Bubba Sparxxx – "All the Same" (with Backbone)
- Bubba Sparxxx – "That Man" (with Duddy Ken)
- Bubba Sparxxx – "The Otherside" (with Petey Pablo)
- Cool Breeze – "Weeestpointin
- Future – "Struggles" (from Superfly)
- Goodie Mob – "Play Yo Flute" (with Kurupt)
- Goodie Mob – "Cutty Buddy"
- Goodie Mob – "Soul Food"
- Joi – "It's Your Life"
- Killer Mike – "A.D.I.D.A.S." (with Big Boi)
- Outkast – "Bowtie" (with Jazze Pha)
- Outkast – "In Your Dreams" (with Killer Mike)
- Outkast – "Land of a Million Drums" (with Killer Mike)
- Outkast – "Morris Brown" (with Scar)
- Outkast – "So Fresh, So Clean" (Remix) (with Snoop Dogg)
- Outkast – "Spottieottiedopaliscious"
- Outkast – "The Way You Move"
- Outkast – "Tough Guy" (with UGK)
- Roscoe – "Head to Toe"
- Slimm Calhoun – "How Much Can I"
- Scar – "If You Want To" (from Superfly)

== Filmography ==
- Idlewild (2006) – Syncopated Church Orchestra

== Awards and nominations ==
Year	Nominee / work	Award	Result	Ref.
2001	Stankonia	Grammy Award for Album of the Year	Nominated	
1995	"Waterfalls"	Grammy Award for Record of the Year	Nominated	
