= Outkast =

American hip-hop duo

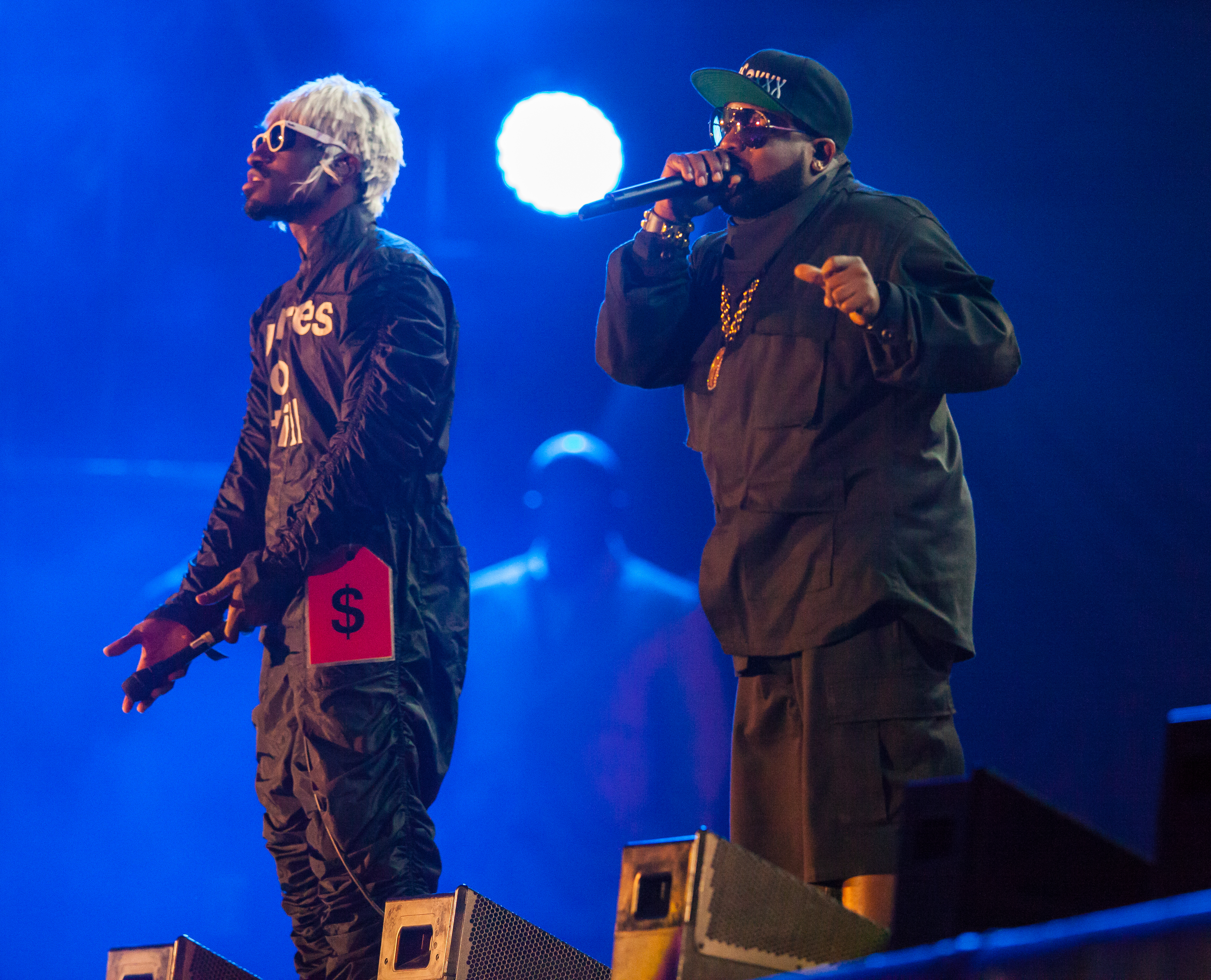
- André 3000 (left) and Big Boi performing in 2014

Background information
- Also known as: Two Shades Deep
- Origin: Atlanta, Georgia, U.S.
- Genres: Southern hip-hop; progressive rap; psychedelic rap
- Works: Discography; songs
- Years active: 1992–2007; 2014; 2016
- Labels: Purple Ribbon; Arista; LaFace; RCA; Earthtone Ideas, Inc.; Epic
- Spinoffs: Earthtone III; Purple Ribbon All-Stars
- Spinoff of: Dungeon Family
- Past members: André 3000; Big Boi
- Website: outkast.com

Outkast (sometimes written as OutKast) was an American hip-hop duo formed in Atlanta, Georgia, in 1992, consisting of Big Boi (Antwan Patton) and André 3000 (André Benjamin, formerly known as Dré). Widely regarded as one of the greatest and most influential hip-hop acts of all time, the duo achieved both critical acclaim and commercial success from the mid-1990s to the mid-2000s, helping to popularize Southern hip-hop with their intricate lyricism, memorable melodies, and positive themes, while experimenting with a diverse range of genres such as funk, psychedelia, jazz, and techno.

Patton and Benjamin formed Outkast as high school students. They released their debut studio album Southernplayalisticadillacmuzik in 1994, which gained popularity after its single "Player's Ball" peaked atop the Billboard Hot Rap Songs chart. The duo further experimented and honed their sound with their second and third albums ATLiens (1996) and Aquemini (1998), both of which were met with critical acclaim. They then achieved mainstream recognition and continued acclaim with their fourth album Stankonia (2000), which was supported by the singles "B.O.B." and "Ms. Jackson", the latter of which topped the Billboard Hot 100 and won Best Rap Performance by a Duo or Group at the 44th Annual Grammy Awards.

The duo then released the double album Speakerboxxx/The Love Below (2003), their only album to debut atop the Billboard 200. It received Diamond certification by the Recording Industry Association of America (RIAA), was supported by the number one singles "The Way You Move" (performed by Big Boi) and "Hey Ya!" (performed by André 3000), and won Album of the Year at the 46th Annual Grammy Awards. Outkast starred in the 2006 musical film Idlewild and recorded the film's accompanying soundtrack, which was released as their final album three days before the film's release. The duo split the following year, and both members have pursued solo careers. Outkast temporarily reunited in 2014 to celebrate their debut album's 20th anniversary with performances at more than 40 festivals worldwide, beginning at the Coachella Festival in April 2014.

Along with being one of hip-hop's most influential acts, Outkast is also one of the most successful, having certified sales of 20 million records between six studio albums and a compilation album, as well as having earned six Grammy Awards. In 2015, Rolling Stone ranked them No. 7 on its list of the "20 Greatest Duos of All Time", while publications such as it and Pitchfork have listed their albums among the best in all of hip-hop and of all time. Outkast was inducted into the Rock and Roll Hall of Fame on November 8, 2025.

== History ==
=== 1992–1995: Formation and debut ===
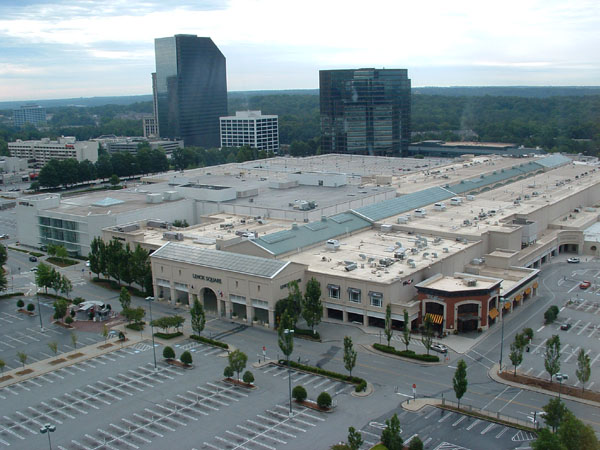
Big Boi and André 3000 met as teenagers at Atlanta's Lenox Square shopping center (pictured).

Antwan Patton and André Benjamin met in 1992 at Lenox Square shopping mall in Atlanta when they were both 16 years old. The two lived in Atlanta and attended Tri-Cities High School. During school, Patton and Benjamin participated in rap battles in the cafeteria. Benjamin's parents were divorced and he was living with his father. Meanwhile, Patton had to move with his four brothers and six sisters from Savannah to Atlanta. Patton and Benjamin eventually teamed up and were pursued by Organized Noize, a group of local producers who would later make hits for the R&B girl group TLC. The duo was initially called "2 Shades Deep"; however, a local singing group already had the name "4 Shades Deep". The duo then decided on the name Outkast because they had a unique fashion style among their classmates. Patton and Benjamin originally performed under the stage names of Black Dog and Black Wolf, respectively. Outkast, Organized Noize, and schoolmates Goodie Mob formed the nucleus of the Dungeon Family organization.

Outkast signed to L.A. And Babyface imprint prior to graduation which would later become LaFace Records in 1992, becoming the label's first hip-hop act and making their first appearance on the remix of labelmate TLC's "What About Your Friends". During the holiday season of 1993, they released their first single, "Player's Ball". The song's funky style, much of it accomplished with live instrumentation, was a hit with audiences. It hit number-one on the Billboard Hot Rap Tracks chart. "Player's Ball" also topped the R&B chart for six weeks.

Their debut album, Southernplayalisticadillacmuzik, was issued on April 26, 1994. This initial effort is credited with laying the foundation for southern hip-hop and is considered a classic by many. Every track on Southernplayalisticadillacmuzik was produced by Organized Noize and featured other members of the Dungeon Family. Follow-up singles included the title track and "Git Up Git Out", a politically charged collaboration with Goodie Mob that was later sampled by Macy Gray for her 1999 hit "Do Something." On this early material, both Big Boi and André contrast lyrical content reflecting the lifestyles of pimps and gangsters with politically conscious material commenting on the status of African Americans in the South. OutKast won Best New Rap Group at the 1995 Source Awards. Within the context of the East Coast – West Coast feud, André came up on stage followed by boos from the crowd and said, "But it's like this though, I'm tired of them closed-minded folks, it's like we gotta demo tape but don't nobody want to hear it. But it's like this: the South got something to say, that's all I got to say." As said by Atlanta native rapper T.I., "Outkast, period. Outkast. That's when it changed. That was the first time when people began to take Southern rap seriously." In the same year, the group contributed "Benz or a Beamer" to the popular New Jersey Drive soundtrack.

=== 1996–1999: Breakthrough with ATLiens and Aquemini ===
After Southernplayalisticadillacmuzik was certified platinum, LaFace Records gave Outkast more creative control and advanced money for their follow-up album, which they recorded from 1995 to 1996.

The duo took the opportunity to recreate their image. On a trip to Jamaica with producer Mr. DJ, the two decided to abandon their cornrow hairstyles in favor of a more natural aesthetic, vowing to stop combing their hair. Dungeon Family member Big Rube observed an increase in the duo's confidence after returning from their first tour, remarking, "They started understanding the power they had in their music. They started showing a swagger that certain artists have—the ones that are stars." The two also became more accustomed to playing live, particularly Big Boi, and André 3000 significantly changed his lifestyle, as he adopted a more eccentric fashion sense, became a vegetarian, and stopped smoking marijuana. The members also underwent changes in their personal lives; in 1995, Big Boi's girlfriend gave birth to their first child and André 3000 and Total's Keisha Spivey ended their two-year relationship.

The double platinum album, ATLiens, was released on August 27, 1996. The album exhibited a notably more laid-back, spacey production sound, taking influence from dub and reggae. On ATLiens, Big Boi and André 3000 abandoned the "hard-partying playa characters" of their debut album in favor of more spacey, futuristic personas, and produced many of the songs on their own for the first time. Critics praised the group's maturing musical style on the record, which debuted at number two on the U.S. R&B/Hip Hop chart. The album would climb to number three on Billboard's top Billboard 200 chart and sold nearly 350,000 copies in its first two weeks of release. The single "Elevators (Me & You)" reached number 12 and spent 20 weeks on the Billboard Hot 100 chart. ATLiens further solidified OutKast as the flagship representatives of the 1st generation Dungeon Family and the Southern hip-hop movement. The album helped the group earn more recognition among East Coast hip-hop fans in the East and West coasts.

For this album, Outkast joined with partner David "Mr. DJ" Sheats to form the Earthtone III production company, which allowed the group to produce some of their own tracks. The double A-side "ATLiens" / "Wheelz of Steel" was the group's third Top 40 single (following "Player's Ball" from their first album and "Elevators (Me & You)" from ATLiens), and reflected the beginning of André's increasingly sober lifestyle: "No drugs or alcohol/so I can get the signal clear," he rhymes about himself in the title track. Also at the time of the album's release, they were managed by Flavor Unit.

Outkast's third album Aquemini was released on September 29, 1998. It was also certified double platinum and reached the number-two position on the Billboard 200 album chart in the United States; its title was a combination of the zodiac signs of Big Boi (an Aquarius) and André (a Gemini). Producing more material themselves, both Big Boi and André explored more eclectic subject matter, delving into sounds inspired by soul, trip hop, and electro music. The album featured production by Organized Noize and collaborations with Raekwon, Slick Rick, funk pioneer and musical forebear George Clinton, and Goodie Mob. Outkast forged the connections between hip-hop and the black freedom struggle with their controversial song "Rosa Parks" featured on the album. Outkast joined Lauryn Hill in 1999, performing as the opening act for the US leg of The Miseducation Tour, in support of the Aquemini.

=== 2000–2001: Stankonia and Big Boi and Dre Present... Outkast ===
"B.O.B. (Bombs Over Baghdad)"
In 2009, "(Bombs Over Baghdad)" placed no. 1 on Pitchfork Media's list of 500 Top Tracks of the 2000s

Originally titled Sandbox, the pair's fourth album, Stankonia was released in October 2000 to positive reviews. The album was seen as a change in the group's musical style, as it had a more commercial and mainstream appeal, compared to their previous albums which were darker, both tonally and thematically. It debuted at number two on the Billboard 200 in the U.S., and would eventually be certified quadruple platinum. Stankonia's first single was "B.O.B. (Bombs Over Baghdad)", a high-tempo-influenced record. The second single, "Ms. Jackson", combined a pop hook with lyrics about divorce and relationship breakups, particularly André's breakup with singer Erykah Badu, the titular "Ms. Jackson" character being a stand-in for Badu's mother. It was at this time that André changed his stage name to the current "André 3000," mostly to avoid being mixed up with Dr. Dre.

The single became their first pop hit, landing the number one position on the Billboard Hot 100 chart, and the number-two position on the UK Singles Chart. The album's final single was the Organized Noize-produced "So Fresh, So Clean", featuring a credited guest appearance from regular guest vocalist and Organized Noize-member Sleepy Brown and garnered a remix featuring Snoop Dogg. All three singles' videos had heavy MTV2 airplay, and Outkast won two 2001 Grammy Awards, one for Best Rap Performance by a Duo or Group for "Ms. Jackson", and another for Stankonia as Best Rap Album.

Pitchfork named Stankonia the fourth greatest album released between 2000 and 2004 in its 2005 feature. Later on the webzine selected Stankonia as the 13th best album of the 2000s. And B.O.B. was chosen number one song of the decade by this same webzine.

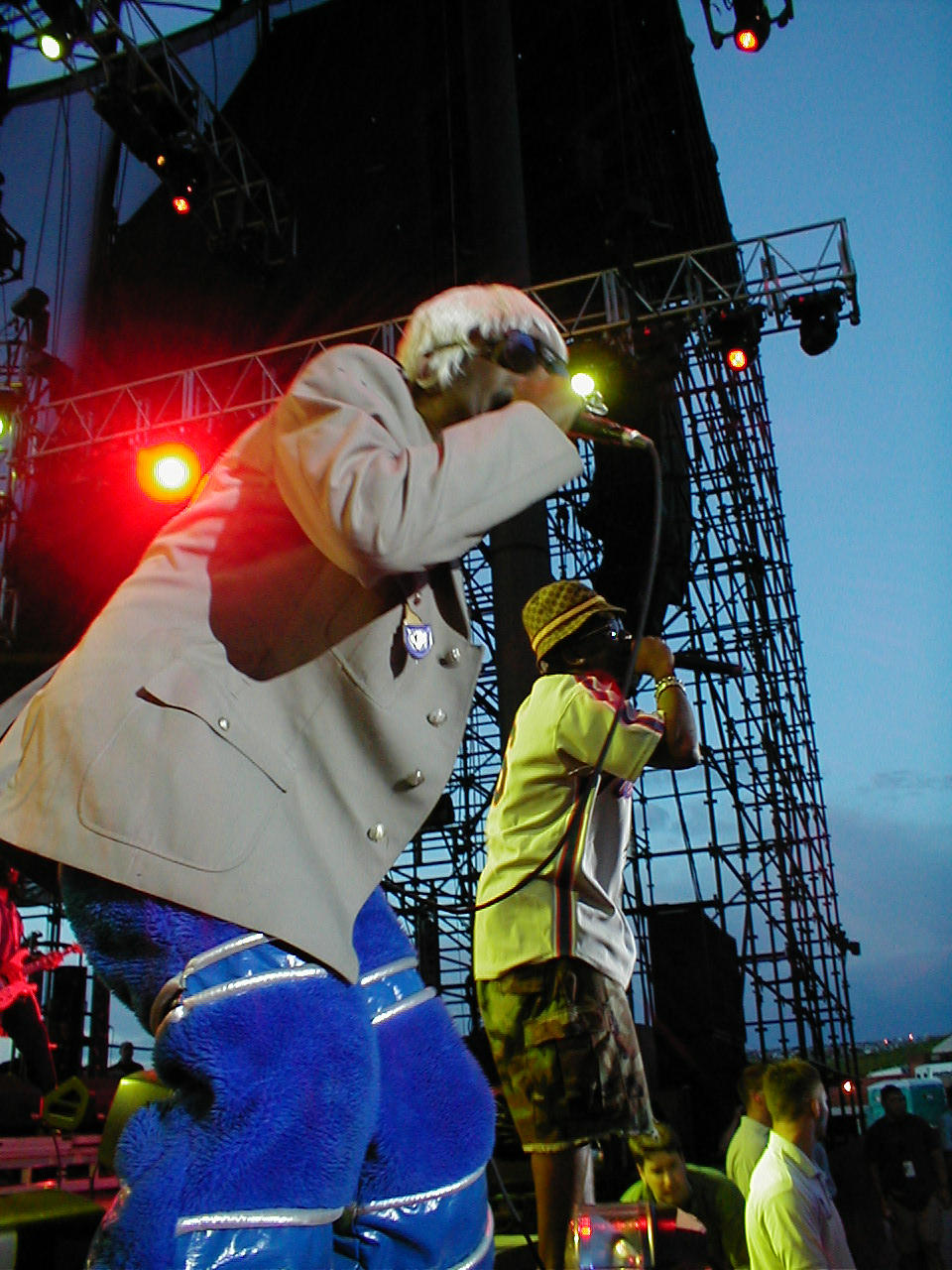
Outkast in 2001

In December 2001, Outkast released a compilation album, Big Boi and Dre Present... Outkast, which contained three new songs. One of these new tracks was the single "The Whole World", which won a 2002 Grammy Award for Best Rap Performance by a Duo or Group. Killer Mike also was featured on the song, gaining some exposure among areas outside of his native Atlanta. The other two new songs were called "Funkin' Around" and "Movin' Cool (The After Party)".

=== 2002–2004: Speakerboxxx/The Love Below ===
Outkast spent two years working on their fifth effort, before releasing a double album, Speakerboxxx/The Love Below, on September 23, 2003. It is essentially two solo albums, one by each member, packaged as a single release under the Outkast banner; the two members also appear and co produce on each other's discs for a few songs apiece. Big Boi's Speakerboxxx is largely a funk and Dirty South blended party record; André 3000's The Love Below features only brief instances of hip-hop, presenting instead elements found in funk, jazz, rock, electronic music, and R&B.

The album was Outkast's biggest commercial success to date, debuting on the Billboard 200 albums chart at number-one and staying there for several weeks. The album eventually sold over five million copies, and, as double-album sales count double for Recording Industry Association of America certification, the album was certified diamond for 10 million units shipped in December 2004. By September 2023, the album was certified 13× platinum.

The first two singles from the album(s), which were released nearly simultaneously, were Big Boi's "The Way You Move" and André 3000's "Hey Ya!" The video for "Hey Ya!" has "The Love Below"—a fictional band with all members, through the use of special effects, played by André—performing in London. "Hey Ya!" was the number one song on the very final weekend of American Top 40 with Casey Kasem. It was also number one a week later on the very first weekend of American Top 40 with Ryan Seacrest. The singles spent ten weeks at number one on the Hot 100 singles chart, with "Hey Ya!" spending nine weeks and "The Way You Move" taking over for one week in February 2004. These singles were seen as a breakthrough for the hip-hop industry, being among the first hip-hop songs to be widely played on adult contemporary radio stations.

Outkast's next official single was not released until the summer of 2004. "Roses", a track featuring both members from The Love Below half of the album, did not meet the level of success as either of its predecessors, but it became a modest-sized hit on urban radio and the American music video networks. The video for "Roses" is loosely based on the musicals West Side Story and Grease. It featured sparring 1950s-style gangs, one representing Speakerboxxx, and one representing The Love Below, likely parodying the widespread arguing among critics and fans as to which half of the album was better. The final singles were André 3000's "Prototype", which was paired with a science fiction-themed video about alien visitors, and Speakerboxxx's "Ghettomusick", which featured both members of Outkast and a sample from a song by Patti LaBelle, who also makes an appearance in the video.

Speakerboxxx/The Love Below won the 2004 Grammy for Album of the Year. OutKast was one of the headlining acts at the show, and gave two performances: Big Boi performed "The Way You Move" with the Outkast backing band during a medley with Earth Wind & Fire, George Clinton and Robert Randolph, while André 3000 performed "Hey Ya!" as the show closer after they had been presented with the Album Of The Year Award.

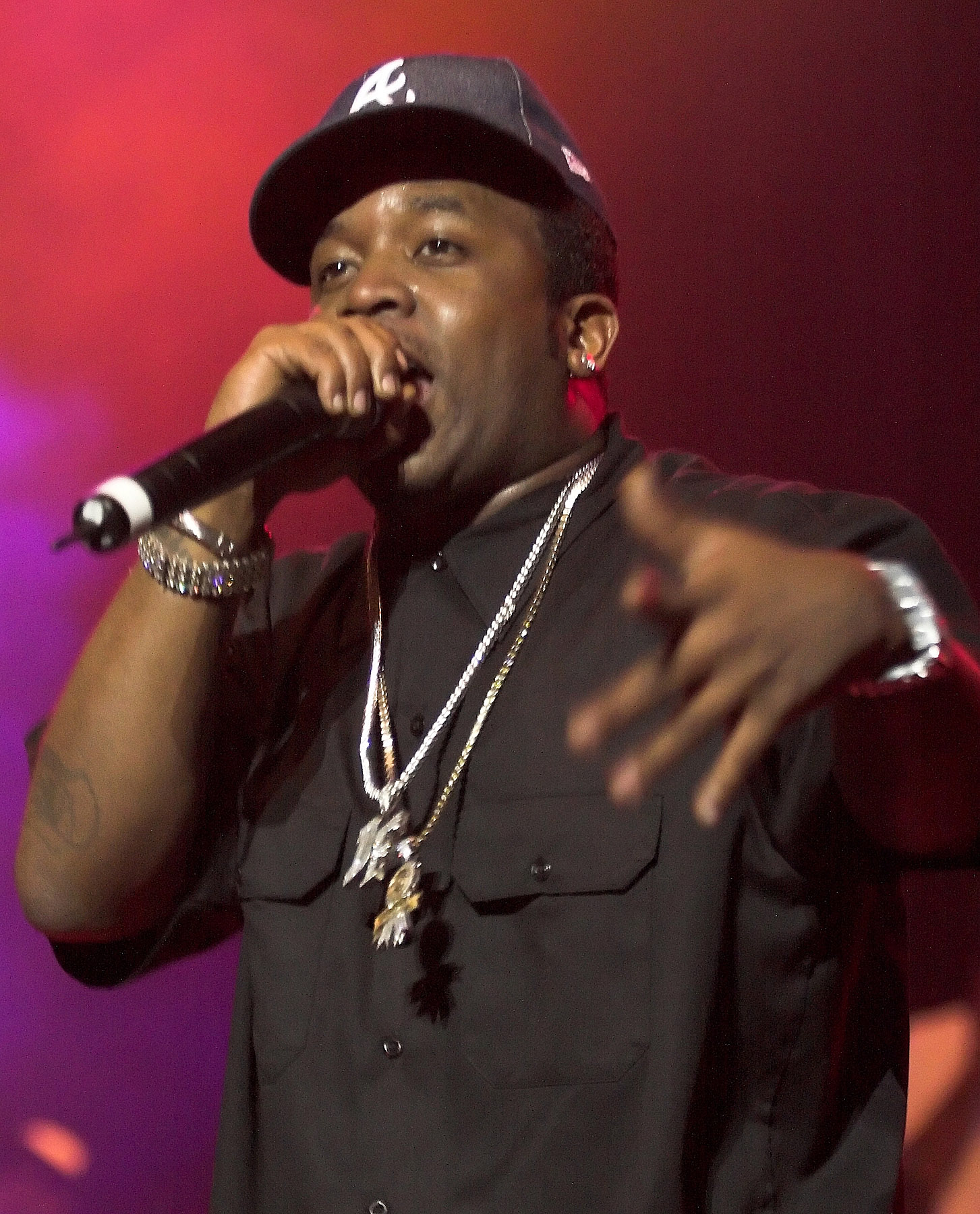
Big Boi performing in 2006 in Atlanta

=== 2005–2006: Idlewild album and film ===
Members also began working on a joint film, Idlewild, directed by Outkast music video director Bryan Barber. Idlewild, a Prohibition-era musical film set to a blues-influenced hip-hop soundtrack, was released on August 25, 2006, by Universal Pictures. The Idlewild soundtrack was released August 22, 2006. In an interview for Billboard, Big Boi stated "This is an Outkast album. It isn't like a soundtrack where we go get this person or that person".

Originally planned for early 2005, Idlewild's release date was pushed to December 2005, before being delayed into 2006. The album debuted at number two on the US Billboard 200 chart with first-week sales of 196,000 copies. It also entered at number one on Billboard's Top R&B/Hip-Hop Albums, at number one on the Top Rap Albums, and at number two on the Top Digital Albums chart. The album dropped to number seven on the Billboard 200, selling 78,000 copies in its second week. It spent nine weeks on the Billboard 200. In the United Kingdom, Idlewild debuted at number 16 on the UK Albums Chart. While it charted within the top-twenty in several other countries, the album spent a minimal number of weeks on most charts. On August 26, 2006, the album was certified platinum in sales by the Recording Industry Association of America, following shipments in excess of one million copies in the United States. It was certified gold in sales by the Canadian Recording Industry Association in November 2006.

The first single of the album, "Mighty 'O'", features both Big Boi and André 3000; the song takes its lyrical hook from the Cab Calloway song "Minnie the Moocher" ("Mighty-ighty-ighty O") and seems to be an example of the album's mix of hip-hop and more traditional American jazz and blues. Next, similar to previous Outkast albums such as Speakerboxxx/The Love Below, two singles—one solely by Big Boi, the other solely by André 3000—were released simultaneously. The second single, almost exclusively featuring Big Boi, is the marching band–influenced "Morris Brown", featuring guest artists Sleepy Brown and Scar, both artists on Big Boi's Purple Ribbon label. The song's title is a reference to Atlanta's Morris Brown College, with the school's marching band providing the instrumentation.

The third single, André 3000's "Idlewild Blue (Don'tchu Worry 'Bout Me)" delves into the blues genre, complete with a blues-style acoustic guitar riff and a harmonica element reminiscent of Aquemini single "Rosa Parks". In tune with the film, Idlewild reflects OutKast's original style tempered by 1930s influences. The fourth single, "Hollywood Divorce" was released in November 2006, and features verses from Lil' Wayne and Snoop Dogg and is produced by André 3000.

=== 2007–2013: Hiatus and solo work ===
In 2007, after the sixth album under the Outkast name, Idlewild, Big Boi announced plans to release a full-fledged solo album. His album was titled Sir Lucious Left Foot: The Son of Chico Dusty. The album's first promotional single, "Royal Flush", was released in 2008, and featured Raekwon and André 3000. After many delays and setbacks, the album was finally released internationally on July 5, 2010. Guest artists include singer Janelle Monáe; Big Boi's own new group Vonnegutt; plus established rappers T.I. and B.o.B. Sir Lucious Left Foot: The Son of Chico Dusty received general acclaim from most music critics, earning praise for its inventive sound, varied musical style, and Big Boi's lyricism. In a July 2010 interview for The Village Voice, Big Boi revealed that he was working on the follow-up album to Sir Lucious Left Foot, entitled Daddy Fat Sax: Soul Funk Crusader, stating that he was "maybe about six songs into it", and that he was "planning on doing a bunch of sax samples, tenor, soprano, and probably have at least a couple sax players come into the studio for the next record". The project later evolved into the 2012 album Vicious Lies and Dangerous Rumors.

André 3000 returned to rapping in 2007, after a hiatus from the genre, appearing on various remixes, including: "Walk It Out", "Throw Some D's", "You", Jay-Z's "30 Something", and original songs such as UGK's "International Players Anthem", Devin the Dude's "What a Job", Fonzworth Bentley's "Everybody", and with Big Boi "Royal Flush" and the leaked single "Lookin For Ya". He also appeared on John Legend's album, Evolver, on the track "Green Light", which was released on October 28, 2008. Prior to the release, Benjamin commented: "It's going to be a surprise for a lot of John Legend fans, because it is a lot more upbeat than John is—than people think John is. I was actually happy to hear it. This is a cool John Legend song." Benjamin has stated that he is making a solo rap album, and that the response to his remixes is part of the motivation for it. In September 2011, it was announced that Outkast was moved to Epic Records following restructuring within Sony Music Entertainment. Epic Records is headed by LA Reid who has worked with Outkast in the past. In 2012, André 3000 was cast to play Jimi Hendrix in a biopic film titled Jimi: All Is by My Side, which was later released on September 26, 2014.

=== 2014–2016: Reunions and The Art of Organized Noize ===
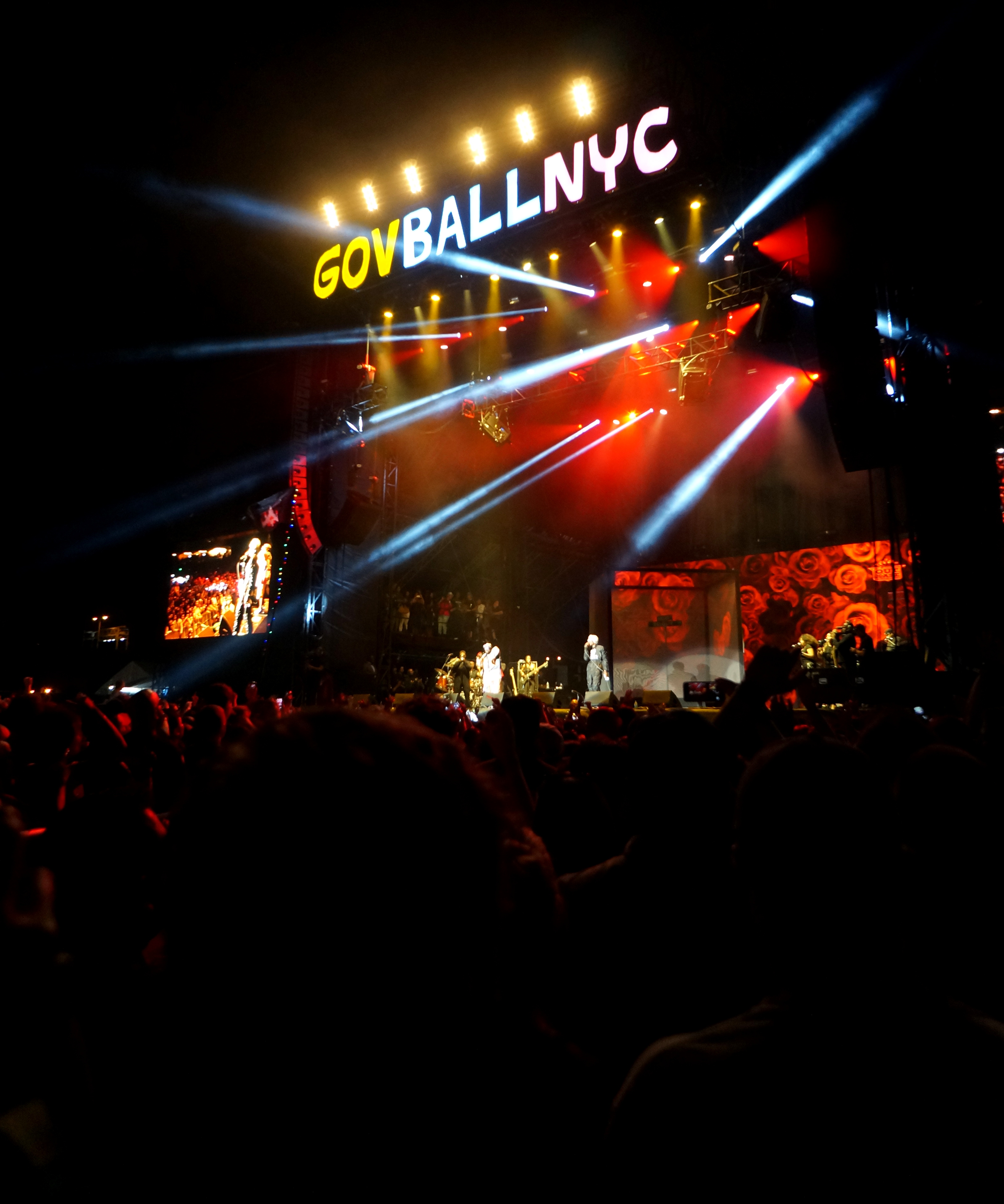
Outkast headlining at Governors Ball Music Festival

In late 2013, it was reported that Outkast would reunite at the Coachella Valley Music and Arts Festival. This was confirmed in January 2014, when it was officially announced that the duo would headline the festival on April 11 and 18. It was later announced that Outkast would perform at more than 40 festivals around the world, including one of the largest festivals in the United Kingdom, Bestival. After five months on the road, Outkast returned to Atlanta for their #ATLast homecoming concerts over the weekend of September 26, 2014. The shows had a large variety of openers, including R&B singer Janelle Monáe and rappers Kid Cudi, 2 Chainz, Future, Bun B, and Childish Gambino. Outkast's Dungeon Family associates Sleepy Brown and Big Gipp also appeared onstage with the duo, performing on their respective songs. After performing at Voodoo Music Experience in New Orleans on October 31, 2014, Outkast resumed their hiatus.

Outkast was featured in the documentary film The Art of Organized Noize, which premiered at the South by Southwest Film Festival and released on Netflix in March 2016. The documentary details the formation of production trio Organized Noize and the early days of the Dungeon Family collective. In June, The Dungeon Family and Organized Noize were announced as part of the lineup for the 2016 edition of Atlanta's annual music festival, ONE Musicfest. On September 10, 2016, Outkast took the stage for the first time in two years, performing at ONE Musicfest alongside Goodie Mob, Killer Mike, Cool Breeze, and other artists.

=== Post-breakup achievements and re-releases ===
On October 30, 2020, Stankonia was reissued to commemorate the album's 20th anniversary. The digital reissue saw the album expanded with previously unreleased remixes. The vinyl reissue features a new black and white galaxy gatefold double LP, as distributed by Vinyl Me Please. In 2023, Speakerboxxx/The Love Below was certified 13× platinum by the RIAA, surpassing The Eminem Show as the highest-certified hip-hop album of all time. That same year, Speakerboxxx/The Love Below and Aquemini received limited edition vinyl pressings to commemorate their respective 20th and 25th anniversaries. In 2025, Outkast was inducted into the Rock and Roll Hall of Fame. Both members attended the ceremony, and Big Boi participated in a tribute performance featuring JID, Doja Cat, Tyler, the Creator, Janelle Monáe, and Killer Mike.

== Musical style and influences ==
Outkast's musical style and lyrical content have evolved throughout the group's career. Rolling Stone described their music as "idiosyncratic" and "inspired by the Afrocentric psychedelics" of George Clinton and Sly Stone, and particularly by the psychedelic funk of Clinton's Parliament-Funkadelic collective. The band's debut album Southernplayalisticadillacmuzik incorporates analog elements such as Southern-styled guitar licks, languid soul melodies, and mellow 1970s funk grooves. It also features digital hip-hop production elements such as programmed snare beats, booty bass elements, ATLiens and Aquemini feature outer space-influenced production with echo and reverb effects. With Stankonia, Outkast became the first hip-hop act to openly acknowledge rave culture as an influence. Stankonia and Speakerboxxx/The Love Below would draw on sources such as psychedelia, gospel, funk, techno, soul, electro, and rock music. During the late 1990s, rappers tended to embrace slow, laid-back beats in their productions. On several tracks on Stankonia, the group employed faster, more chaotic tempos to reflect rave culture and the introduction of new drugs such as ecstasy into the hip-hop scene.

One central motif of Outkast's songwriting is the duality of the two members and their differing personalities, with Big Boi as "the player" and André 3000 as "the poet". Big Boi generally covers the more conventional hip-hop topics such as his childhood in the South, sex, and partying, while André 3000 discusses more unorthodox themes. In contrast to much of hip-hop music in the late 1990s, Outkast did not tone down its Southern regional qualities, like the harmonica break on "Rosa Parks" and distinctive Atlanta slang and diction throughout. The duo experimented with several delivery styles on the record, using "relaxed, hyper, distorted, speedy and conversational presentations." Outkast often discusses the status of women in the South, and contrasts with the misogyny in hip-hop culture. In Slate, Alex Abramovich praised the duo for "[tending] to shy away from the misogyny and violence rap is so often (and not always unjustly) condemned for." In the book Classic Material: The Hip-Hop Album Guide, contributing author Tony Green writes that songs such as "Slum Beautiful" and "Toilet Tisha" "reimagine 'round the way girls, not only as just more than one-dimensional accessories, but as objects of affection with lives and concerns that are worth exploring."

== Collaborations and other work ==
During the recording of Stankonia Outkast and Mr. DJ began producing tracks for the artists on their Aquemini Records imprint through Columbia, including Slimm Cutta Calhoun and Killer Mike, who made his debut on Stankonia's "Snappin' & Trappin."

In 2002, Outkast participated in the only Dungeon Family group album, Even in Darkness, along with Goodie Mob, Killer Mike, Sleepy Brown, Witchdoctor, and Backbone among others, and featuring Bubba Sparxxx, Shuga Luv and Mello. In 2002, the group and Killer Mike contributed the lead single "Land of a Million Drums" to the Scooby-Doo soundtrack.

On February 27, 2011, it was announced that Big Boi would be creating a joint album along with Killer Mike and fellow Atlanta rapper Pill. Later that day, Big Boi posted on his Twitter account that he was mixing Killer Mike's album entitled, PL3DGE.

In 2010, André 3000 was featured on Ciara's remix for her hit single "Ride", from the album Basic Instinct. On January 14, 2011, a song with Ke$ha called "The Sleazy Remix" was leaked. On June 7, 2011, Beyoncé's song "Party" was leaked, it features Benjamin, it is his first collaboration with the singer. It is also featured on Beyoncé's fourth studio album entitled 4 released June 24, 2011. On August 24, 2011, Lil Wayne's album Tha Carter IV leaked, featuring a song entitled "Interlude" with Benjamin and fellow rapper Tech N9ne performing. Also in 2011, André featured on Chris Browns "Deuces" remix as well as on a Lloyd song, "Dedication To My Ex (Miss That)", with Lil Wayne. In 2012, André also appeared on Drake's second album Take Care, on the song "The Real Her" which also featured Lil Wayne.

In 2012, André 3000 featured on the Gorillaz single "DoYaThing" with James Murphy of LCD Soundsystem. The song was released as a free download in February that year as part of a Converse promotion.

André 3000 was featured on Frank Ocean's 2012 album Channel Orange on the song "Pink Matter". On January 11, 2013, Big Boi appeared on a remix of the song, adding a verse before André's. In response to the added verse, André issued a statement on January 15 insisting that the track did not constitute an Outkast reunion. André 3000 also featured uncredited vocals on Ocean's 2016 album Blonde on the song "Solo (Reprise)" with his verse taking up majority of the track.

Phantogram revealed in an interview with Variance Magazine in February 2014 that they plan to release an EP with Big Boi. The resulting album Big Grams was released in September 2015.

== Film projects ==
Benjamin made appearances in Families, The Shield (as Robert Huggins, a character that originated in an episode titled "On Tilt" from Season 3 in 2004), Be Cool, Revolver, Semi Pro, and Four Brothers. He was also cast as Percival in Idlewild, released on August 26, 2006. He voiced a crow in Charlotte's Web, a movie adaptation of the 1952 children's book. As of November 2006, he voiced "Sunny Bridges," a prize-winning musician who gives up touring to teach at his alma mater, in Class of 3000, an animated series he produced on Cartoon Network. He has also worked with Esthero on a promotional version of "Jungle Book" which was on a Wikked lil' grrrls sampler, but never made it to the actual album due to issues with Esthero's label, Warner Bros. The following year, he appeared in the basketball comedy Semi-Pro, with Woody Harrelson and Will Ferrell. He also starred in the 2008 film Battle in Seattle, a film about the 1999 Seattle World Trade Organization protests. Benjamin was a member of Quentin Tarantino and Lawrence Bender's production company A Band Apart until its close in 2006; he then formed his own company, Moxie Turtle.

Big Boi appeared on Nick Cannon's Wild 'n Out Season 3 as one of the many guest stars, as well as guest starring and appearing as a musical guest on Chappelle's Show performing his song "The Rooster". He appeared in T.I.'s film ATL, Outkast's film Idlewild as Rooster and starring in Who's Your Caddy?. He appeared in the Law & Order: Special Victims Unit episode "Wildlife", which aired November 18, 2008. Big Boi played hip-hop artist "Got$ Money".

== Lawsuit ==
In April 1999, Outkast and LaFace Records were sued by Rosa Parks over Aquemini's most successful radio single, which bears Parks' name as its title. The lawsuit alleged that the song misappropriates Parks' name, and it objected to the song's obscenities.

The song's lyrics are virtually unrelated to Parks, except for a reference in the chorus: "Ah ha, hush that fuss / Everybody move to the back of the bus". The song, which Outkast maintained was intended partly as homage, refers to Parks metaphorically: the purpose of the song's chorus is to imply that Outkast is overturning hip-hop's old order, and that people should make way for a new style and sound. In the initial suit, the District Court for the Eastern District of Michigan at Ann Arbor granted summary judgment for Outkast.

Later on appeal, the issue of whether Outkast violated the Lanham Act for false advertising was reversed and remanded for further proceedings. This was based on the court's determination that the title "Rosa Parks" had little artistic relevance, whether symbolic or metaphorical, to Rosa Parks the person. Parks' representation hired lawyer Johnnie Cochran to appeal the decision in 2001, but the appeal was denied. The judge ruled that while there was linkage between the song and Rosa Parks, the song was an "expressive work" and was therefore protected by the First Amendment. In 2003, the Supreme Court turned down an appeal to overrule the lower court's decision.

In December 2003, André told UK journalist Angus Batey that, following a Detroit concert in the midst of the legal battle, relatives of Parks had approached him and implied that the case had less to do with Parks than with the lawyers. In April 2005, the judge in the case appointed an impartial representative for Parks after her family expressed concerns that her caretakers and her lawyers were pursuing the case based on their own financial interest. The case was settled on April 14, 2005, with Outkast and the co-defendants, Sony BMG and its subsidiaries Arista Records and LaFace Records, admitting no wrongdoing but agreeing to develop and fund educational programs concerning Rosa Parks.

== Discography ==
Studio albums

- Southernplayalisticadillacmuzik (1994)
- ATLiens (1996)
- Aquemini (1998)
- Stankonia (2000)
- Speakerboxxx/The Love Below (2003)
- Idlewild (2006)
