= Big Boi discography =

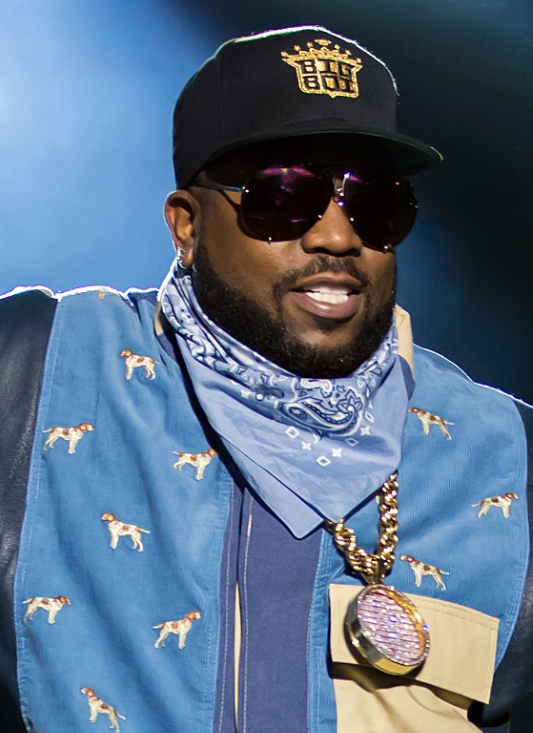
- Big Boi performing in 2014
- Studio albums: 3
- Extended plays: 1
- Singles: 22
- Music videos: 25
- Promotional singles: 5
- Other charted songs: 2
- Mixtapes: 1

The discography of American rapper Big Boi consists of three studio albums, one mixtape, twenty-two singles, five promotional singles and twenty-five music videos. Big Boi initially achieved success as a member of the hip hop duo Outkast with fellow rapper André 3000; they have recorded and released six studio albums together, and the singles "Ms. Jackson", "Hey Ya!" (performed solely by 3000) and "The Way You Move" (performed solely by Big Boi) have all topped the US Billboard Hot 100. Big Boi guest appeared on the 1995 single "Dirty South" by Atlanta-based hip hop group Goodie Mob, which entered the Billboard Hot 100. During the late 1990s and early 2000s, he made other appearances on commercially successful singles including "All n My Grill" by Missy Elliott, "A.D.I.D.A.S." by Killer Mike and "Girlfight" by Brooke Valentine—each likewise entered the Billboard Hot 100.

Big Boi released his first two solo singles – "Royal Flush" and "Sumthin's Gotta Give" – in 2008, with "Ringtone" following in 2009. All three songs were recorded for his purported debut studio album Sir Lucious Left Foot: The Son of Chico Dusty; however, due to legal complications resulting from Big Boi's departure from his former record label Jive Records, the album's release was considerably delayed and was not released until 2010. Its first single, "Shutterbugg", peaked at number 60 on the US Hot R&B/Hip-Hop Songs chart, as well as number 32 on the UK Singles Chart and number 13 on the UK R&B Chart. The album spawned the single "Follow Us", a collaboration with the rock group Vonnegutt. Following its eventual release, Sir Lucious Left Foot: The Son of Chico Dusty debuted at number three on the US Billboard 200, and appeared on several other national album charts. Big Boi's second studio album, Vicious Lies and Dangerous Rumors, was released on December 11, 2012, in the United States, and peaked at number 34 on the Billboard 200 in the first week following its release. The album was preceded by the release of the singles "Gossip", "She Said OK" and "Mama Told Me".

== Albums ==
=== Studio albums ===
List of studio albums, with selected chart positions
Title	Album details	Peak chart positions							
Title	Album details	US	US R&B/HH	US Rap	AUS	CAN	NOR	SWI	UK
Sir Lucious Left Foot: The Son of Chico Dusty	Released: July 6, 2010 (US); Label: Purple Ribbon, Def Jam South; Format: CD, LP, digital download	3	3	3	33	20	14	99	80
Vicious Lies and Dangerous Rumors	Released: December 11, 2012 (US); Label: Purple Ribbon, Def Jam South; Format: CD, LP, digital download	34	6	3	—	—	—	—	—
Boomiverse	Released: June 16, 2017; Label: Epic; Format: CD, LP, Cassette, digital download	28	12	8	—	76	—	—	—

=== Mixtapes ===
List of mixtapes, with selected information
Title	Album details
Mixtape for Dummies: A Guide to Global Greatness	Released: July 2, 2010 (US); Label: Purple Ribbon; Format: Digital download

== Collaborative albums ==
List of extended plays, with selected chart positions
Title	Details	Peak chart positions		
Title	Details	US	US Rap	US Alt.
Big Grams (with Phantogram; as Big Grams)	Released: September 25, 2015; Label: Epic Records; Format: CD, LP, digital download	38	5	9
Big Sleepover (with Sleepy Brown)	Released: December 10, 2021; Label: Purple Ribbon, Hitco; Format: Digital download, streaming	—	—	—

== Singles ==
=== As lead artist ===
List of singles as lead artist, with selected chart positions, showing year released and album name
Title	Year	Peak chart positions						Certifications	Album
Title	Year	US Bub.	US R&B/HH	FRA	JPN	UK	UK R&B	Certifications	Album
"Royal Flush" (featuring André 3000 and Raekwon)	2008	—	68	—	—	—	—		Non-album singles
"Sumthin's Gotta Give" (featuring Mary J. Blige)	2008	—	83	—	—	—	—		Non-album singles
"Ringtone"^{[A]}	2009	—	105	—	—	—	—		Non-album singles
"Shutterbugg"^{[B]} (featuring Cutty)	2010	20	60	—	—	31	13		Sir Lucious Left Foot: The Son of Chico Dusty
"Follow Us"^{[C]} (featuring Vonnegutt)	2010	—	119	—	—	—	—		Sir Lucious Left Foot: The Son of Chico Dusty
"Gossip" (featuring UGK and Big K.R.I.T.)	2012	—	—	—	—	—	—		Vicious Lies and Dangerous Rumors
"She Said OK" (featuring Theophilus London and Tre Luce)	2012	—	—	—	—	—	—		Vicious Lies and Dangerous Rumors
"Mama Told Me" (featuring Kelly Rowland)	2012	—	—	—	—	—	—		Vicious Lies and Dangerous Rumors
"Mic Jack" (featuring Adam Levine, Scar and Sleepy Brown)	2017	—	—	—	—	—	—		Boomiverse
"Kill Jill" (featuring Killer Mike and Jeezy)	2017	—	—	—	—	—	—		Boomiverse
"All Night" (featuring LunchMoney Lewis)	2017	16	103	20	88	76	—	RIAA: Gold	Boomiverse
"Doin' It" (featuring Sleepy Brown) / "Return of the Dope Boi" (featuring Killer Mike and Backbone)	2019	—	—	—	—	—	—		Big Sleepover
"—" denotes a recording that did not chart or was not released in that territory.									Big Sleepover

=== As featured artist ===
List of singles as featured artist, with selected chart positions, showing year released and album name
Title	Year	Peak chart positions										Album
Title	Year	US	US R&B	US Rap	AUS	GER	IRL	NZ	SWE	SWI	UK	Album
"Dirty South" (Goodie Mob featuring Cool Breeze and Big Boi)	1995	92	53	8	—	—	—	—	—	—	—	Soul Food
"All n My Grill"^{[D]} (Missy Elliott featuring MC Solaar or Big Boi)	1999	64	16	—	—	22	—	—	39	23	20	Da Real World
"Get Rich to This" (Goobie Mob featuring Big Boi and Backbone)	1999	—	65	—	—	—	—	—	—	—	—	World Party
"85" (YoungBloodZ featuring Jim Crow and Big Boi)	2000	—	53	—	—	—	—	—	—	—	—	Against da Grain
"In da Wind" (Trick Daddy featuring Cee Lo Green and Big Boi)	2002	70	28	16	—	—	—	—	—	—	—	Thug Holiday
"A.D.I.D.A.S." (Killer Mike featuring Big Boi and Sleepy Brown)	2003	60	42	20	88	—	45	36	—	—	22	Monster
"Never Gonna Let You Go (She's a Keepa)" (Omarion featuring Big Boi)	2004	—	—	—	—	—	—	—	—	—	—	O
"Girlfight" (Brooke Valentine featuring Lil Jon and Big Boi)	2005	23	13	—	50	70	47	28	—	61	35	Chain Letter
"Hood Boy"^{[E]} (Fantasia featuring Big Boi)	2006	103	21	—	—	—	—	—	—	—	—	Fantasia
"Margarita" (Sleepy Brown featuring Pharrell and Big Boi)	2006	—	64	—	—	—	—	—	—	—	—	Mr. Brown
"Tightrope" (Janelle Monáe featuring Big Boi)	2010	—	—	—	—	—	—	—	—	—	—	The ArchAndroid
"I'm On" (Trae featuring Wiz Khalifa, Lupe Fiasco, Wale, Big Boi and MDMA)	2011	—	—	—	—	—	—	—	—	—	—	Street King
"Chase Me" (Danger Mouse featuring Run the Jewels and Big Boi)	2017	—	—	—	—	—	—	—	—	—	—	Music from the Motion Picture Baby Driver
"Out at Night" Clean Bandit featuring Big Boi and KYLE)	2018	—		—	—	—	—	—	—	—	—	What Is Love?
"—" denotes a recording that did not chart or was not released in that territory.

=== Promotional singles ===
List of promotional singles, showing year released and album name
Title	Year	Album
"I'm So Hood" (Remix) (DJ Khaled featuring Young Jeezy, Ludacris, Busta Rhymes, Big Boi, Lil Wayne, Fat Joe, Birdman and Rick Ross)	2007	We the Best
"Fo Yo Sorrows" (featuring Too Short, George Clinton and Sam Chris)	2010	Sir Lucious Left Foot: The Son of Chico Dusty
"General Patton"	2010	Sir Lucious Left Foot: The Son of Chico Dusty
"Tangerine" (featuring T.I. and Khujo Goodie)	2010	Sir Lucious Left Foot: The Son of Chico Dusty
"Lookin' 4 Ya" (Jedi Remix) (featuring André 3000 and Sleepy Brown)	2010	non-album singles
"Ain't No Way Around It" (Remix) (DJ Drama featuring Future, Big Boi and Young Jeezy)	2012	non-album singles
"—" denotes a recording that did not chart or was not released in that territory.

== Other charted songs ==
List of songs, with selected chart positions, showing year released and album name
Title	Year	Peak chart positions	Album
Title	Year	US R&B	Album
"Energy" (Raheem DeVaughn featuring Big Boi)	2008	88	Love Behind the Melody
"Shine Blockas"^{[F]} (featuring Gucci Mane)	2009	123	Sir Lucious Left Foot: The Son of Chico Dusty

== Guest appearances ==
List of non-single guest appearances, with other performing artists, showing year released and album name
Title	Year	Other performer(s)	Album
"Love in Ya Mouth"	1997	Kilo Ali	Organized Bass
"Gangsta Partna"	1997	Cool Breeze	Hoodlum (soundtrack)
"Dirt Work"	2001	Slimm Calhoun	The Skinny
"Follow the Light"	2001	Dungeon Family	Even in Darkness
"On and On and On"	2001	Dungeon Family	Even in Darkness
"6 Minutes (Dungeon Family It's On)"	2001	Dungeon Family	Even in Darkness
"White Guts"	2001	Dungeon Family	Even in Darkness
"Poppin' Tags"	2002	Jay-Z, Killer Mike, Twista	The Blueprint 2: The Gift & The Curse
"Hip-Hop Star"	2003	Beyoncé, Sleepy Brown	Dangerously in Love
"Car Show"	2003	Jagged Edge	Hard
"This Is How I Feel"	2005	Earth, Wind & Fire, Kelly Rowland, Sleepy Brown	Illumination
"Oh No"	2005	Bubba Sparxxx, Killer Mike	XXX: State of the Union soundtrack
"Porno Bitches"	2005	Bizarre, Devin the Dude, Kon Artis	Hannicap Circus
"My Man"	2005	Carlos Santana, Mary J. Blige	All That I Am
"Runnin' Away"	2005	Sleepy Brown, Killer Mike	Different Strokes by Different Folks
"Smilin' (You Caught Me)"	2005	Scar, CeeLo Green, DJ Swiff	Different Strokes by Different Folks
"Intro"	2005	none	Got Purp? Vol. 2
"Kryptolude (Interlude)"	2005	none	Got Purp? Vol. 2
"My Chrome"	2005	Killer Mike	Got Purp? Vol. 2
"U Got Me!"	2005	Scar	Got Purp? Vol. 2
"808"	2005	Big Gee, Bun B, G-Rock	Got Purp? Vol. 2
"Wanna Move"	2006	Diddy, Ciara, Scar	Press Play
"And I Love You"	2007	Rich Boy, Pastor Troy	Rich Boy
"Hood Nigga" (Remix)	2007	Gorilla Zoe, Young Jeezy, Jody Breeze, Rick Ross	none
"Get It Shawty" (Remix)	2007	Lloyd, Ja Rule	none
"Hold Up"	2007	Chris Brown	Exclusive
"Last Night" (Remix)	2007	Diddy, Keyshia Cole, Yung Joc, The Game, Rich Boy	none
"Energy"	2008	Raheem DeVaughn	Love Behind the Melody
"Love's Crazy"	2008	Slim	Love's Crazy
"Magnificent" (Remix)	2009	Rick Ross, John Legend, Special Ed, Diddy	none
"She Got a Friend"	2009	Gucci Mane, Juelz Santana	The State vs. Radric Davis
"Nothin' on You" (Remix)	2010	B.o.B, Bruno Mars	none
"Ready Set Go" (Remix)	2011	Killer Mike, T.I.	PL3DGE
"Speakers on Blast"	2011	The Game, E-40	The R.E.D. Album
"So Called Friends"	2011	Raekwon, Pusha T	Dope on the Table
"Banana Clipper"	2013	Run the Jewels	Run the Jewels
"Electric Lady" (Dungeon–Wondamix)	2013	Janelle Monáe, CeeLo Green	The Electric Lady
"Animals" (Remix)	2014	Maroon 5	none
"Sinners (Saved By Grace) Remix"	2016	Deitrick Haddon	Saints & Sinners Season 1 Soundtrack
"Laid Back"	2016	Dallas Davidson, Mannie Fresh, Maggie Rose	none
"We the Ones"	2017	Organized Noise, Cee-Lo, Big Rube	Organized Noise EP
"Rabbit's Revenge"	2018	Tom Morello, Bassnectar, Killer Mike	The Atlas Underground
"Palm Reader"	2021	Dreamers, UPSHAL	none
"Garden Party"	2021	Masego, JID	none
"He Got Me"	2024	Pastor Mike Jr.	I Got Away

== Solo production discography ==
Note: Big Boi also helped produce several songs on OutKast's albums with cohort André 3000, often credited as simply OutKast or as their production outfit Earthtone III, which included Mr. DJ.

List of non-performing songwriting credits (excluding guest appearances, interpolations, and samples)
Track(s)	Year	Credit	Artist(s)	Album
1. "A.D.I.D.A.S." (featuring Big Boi)	2003	Co-Producer (with Mr. DJ)	Killer Mike	Monster
3. "The Way You Move" (featuring Sleepy Brown)	2003	Co-Producer (with Carl Mo)	Outkast	Speakerboxxx/The Love Below
5. "She Don't Know My Name"	2004	Co-producer (with the Beat Bullies)	Nelly	Suit
4. "My Man"; (featuring Mary J. Blige and Big Boi)	2005	Co-Producer (with the Beat Bullies)	Santana	All That I Am
"My Chrome"	2005	Co-Producer (with Mr. DJ and Slimm Jim)	Killer Mike	Non-album single
7. "Still Around"	2005	Co-Producer (with Cory Rooney and Cutmaster Swiff)	Jennifer Lopez	Rebirth
7. "Ain't Life Grand" (featuring Big Boi)	2006	Producer	Bubba Sparxxx	The Charm
8. "Wanna Move"; (featuring Big Boi, Ciara and Scar)	2006	Co-Producer (with Danja)	Diddy	Press Play
9. "The Train"	2006	Producer	Outkast	Idlewild
14. "Call the Law"	2006	Co-producer (with Nate "Rocket" Wonder, Janelle Monáe and Chuck Lightning)	Outkast	Idlewild
3. "Should've Thought Twice"	2006	Co-Producer (with Sean Garrett)	Chapter 4	Sampler
5. "Shutterbugg" (featuring Cutty)	2010	Co-producer (with Scott Storch)	Big Boi	Sir Lucious Left Foot: The Son of Chico Dusty
6. "General Patton"	2010	Producer	Big Boi	Sir Lucious Left Foot: The Son of Chico Dusty
7. "Tangerine"; (featuring T.I. and Khujo Goodie)	2010	Producer	Big Boi	Sir Lucious Left Foot: The Son of Chico Dusty
11. "Fo Yo Sorrows"; (featuring Too Short, George Clinton and Sam Chris)	2010	Producer	Big Boi	Sir Lucious Left Foot: The Son of Chico Dusty
12. "Night Night"	2010	Producer	Big Boi	Sir Lucious Left Foot: The Son of Chico Dusty
13. "Shine Blockas"; (featuring Gucci Mane)	2010	Producer	Big Boi	Sir Lucious Left Foot: The Son of Chico Dusty
15. "Back Up Plan"	2010	Producer	Big Boi	Sir Lucious Left Foot: The Son of Chico Dusty
2. "The Thickets"; (featuring Sleepy Brown)	2012	Producer	Big Boi	Vicious Lies and Dangerous Rumors
8. "Thom Pettie"	2012	Producer	Big Boi	Vicious Lies and Dangerous Rumors
9. "Mama Told Me"; (featuring Kelly Rowland)	2012	Producer	Big Boi	Vicious Lies and Dangerous Rumors

== Music videos ==
=== As lead artist ===
List of music videos as lead artist, with directors, showing year released
Title	Year	Director(s)
Kryptonite (I'm on It) (Get Purp All-Stars)	2005	`
"Sumthin's Gotta Give" (featuring Mary J. Blige)	2008	none
"Shutterbugg" (featuring Cutty)	2010	Chris Robinson
"Shine Blockas" (featuring Gucci Mane)	2010	Zach Wolfe
"Fo Yo Sorrows" (featuring Too Short, George Clinton and Sam Chris)	2010	Zach Wolfe
"Follow Us" (featuring Vonnegutt)	2010	Zach Wolfe
"General Patton"	2010	Zach Wolfe
"You Ain't No DJ" (featuring Yelawolf)	2010	Parris
"The Train, Pt. 2 (Sir Lucious Left Foot Saves the Day)" (featuring Sam Chris)	2010	none
"Be Still" (featuring Janelle Monáe)	2011	Big Boi, G. Visuals
"She Said OK" (featuring Theophilus London and Tre Luce)	2012	Alexi Papalexopoulos
"Mama Told Me" (featuring Kelly Rowland)	2012	Syndrome
"In the A" (featuring T.I. and Ludacris)	2013	Alexi Papalexopoulos
"Apple of My Eye"	2013	Trevor Kane
"The Thickets" (featuring Sleepy Brown)	2013	Trevor Kane
"Double or Nothing" (with B.o.B)	2013	Vice, Noisey, EA
"Mic Jack" (featuring Adam Levine, Scar and Sleepy Brown)	2017	Motion Family
"Kill Jill" (featuring Killer Mike and Jeezy)	2017	Bryan Barber

=== As featured artist ===
List of music videos as featured artist, with directors, showing year released
Title	Year	Director(s)
"Dirty South" (Goodie Mob featuring Big Boi)	1995	`
"All n My Grill" (Missy Elliott featuring Big Boi)	1999	Hype Williams
"Get Rich to This" (Goodie Mob featuring Backbone & Big Boi)	1999	`
"85" (YoungBloodZ featuring Jim Crow and Big Boi)	2000	David Nelson
"In da Wind" (Trick Daddy featuring Cee Lo Green and Big Boi)	2002	Bryan Barber
"A.D.I.D.A.S." (Killer Mike featuring Big Boi and Sleepy Brown)	2003	Fat Cats
"Girlfight" (Brooke Valentine featuring Lil Jon and Big Boi)	2005	Chris Robinson
"Hood Boy" (Fantasia featuring Big Boi)	2006	Ray Kay
"Margarita" (Sleepy Brown featuring Pharrell and Big Boi)	2006	Anthony Mandler
"She Got a Friend" (Gucci Mane featuring Juelz Santana and Big Boi)	2009	Mr. Boomtown
"Tightrope" (Janelle Monáe featuring Big Boi)	2010	Wendy Morgan
"I'm On" (Trae featuring Wiz Khalifa, Lupe Fiasco, Wale, Big Boi and MDMA)	2012	none
"Ain't No Way Around It" (Remix) (DJ Drama featuring Future, Big Boi and Young Jeezy)	2012	G. Visuals
"Sinners (saved by Grace) Remix" (Deitrick Madden featuring Big Boi)	2016	
"Rabbit's Revenge" (Tom Morello featuring Killer Mike, Big Boi & Bassnectar)	2018	Sean Evans
Garden Party (Masego featuring Big Boi & JID)	2021	

== See also ==
- Purple Ribbon All-Stars discography
- Outkast discography

== Notes ==
- A "Ringtone" did not enter the Hot R&B/Hip-Hop Songs chart, but peaked at number 5 on the Bubbling Under R&B/Hip-Hop Singles chart, which acts as an extension to the Hot R&B/Hip-Hop Songs chart.
- B "Shutterbugg" did not enter the Billboard Hot 100, but peaked at number 20 on the Bubbling Under Hot 100 Singles chart, which acts as an extension to the Hot 100.
- C "Follow Us" did not enter the Hot R&B/Hip-Hop Songs chart, but peaked at number 19 on the Bubbling Under R&B/Hip-Hop Singles chart, which acts as an extension to the Hot R&B/Hip-Hop Songs chart.
- D Two single versions of "All n My Grill" were released: the first features MC Solaar, and the second features Big Boi.
- E "Hood Boy" did not enter the Billboard Hot 100, but peaked at number 3 on the Bubbling Under Hot 100 Singles chart, which acts as an extension to the Hot 100.
- F "Shine Blockas" did not enter the Hot R&B/Hip-Hop Songs chart, but peaked at number 23 on the Bubbling Under R&B/Hip-Hop Singles chart, which acts as an extension to the Hot R&B/Hip-Hop Songs chart.
