= Kryptonite (I'm on It) =

2006 song

Single by Purple Ribbon All-Stars featuring Big Boi, Killer Mike, BlackOwned C-Bone and Rock D.

from the album Got Purp? Vol 2
- Released: January 6, 2006
- Recorded: 2005
- Genre: Crunk
- Length: 4:32 (Album Version); 4:02 (Radio Edit)
- Label: Purple Ribbon
- Songwriters: Antwan Patton; Michael Render; Cory Andrews; Kristopher P. Bailey; Nsilo Reddick; Nicholas Sherwood
- Producer: The Beat Bullies

Purple Ribbon All-Stars singles chronology
"Kryptonite (I'm on It)" (2006)	"Body Rock" (2006)

"Kryptonite (I'm on It)" is a posse cut song by American Southern hip hop collective Purple Ribbon All-Stars. It was released on January 6, 2006 via Purple Ribbon/Virgin Records as the lead single from their album Big Boi Presents... Got Purp? Vol 2. Written and performed by members Big Boi, Killer Mike, BlackOwned C-Bone and Rock D, it was produced by The Beat Bullies.

The single peaked at number 35 on the Billboard Hot 100 and number 8 on the Hot R&B/Hip-Hop Songs in the United States. It was certified Gold by the Recording Industry Association of America on March 9, 2023.

An official remix was made, which features Big Boi, Killer Mike, Busta Rhymes, Lil' Wayne, Bubba Sparxxx and Remy Ma. It was covered by rock band Emanuel for 2008 compilation album Punk Goes Crunk.

== Track listing ==
No.	Title	Length
1.	"Kryptonite (I'm On It)" (Radio Edit)	4:02
2.	"Kryptonite (I'm On It)" (Instrumental)	4:35
3.	"Kryptonite (I'm On It)" (Album Version)	4:19
4.	"Kryptonite (I'm On It)" (Acapella Explicit)	4:34
Total length:		17:30

== Charts ==
=== Weekly charts ===
Chart (2006)	Peak position
US Billboard Hot 100	35
US Hot R&B/Hip-Hop Songs (Billboard)	8
US Rhythmic (Billboard)	27

=== Year-end charts ===
Chart (2006)	Position
US Hot R&B/Hip-Hop Songs (Billboard)	45

== Certifications ==
Region	Certification	Certified units/sales
United States (RIAA)	Gold	500,000^{‡}
^{‡} Sales+streaming figures based on certification alone.
