= The Beat Bullies =

Atlanta-based music production duo

- Origin: Atlanta, Georgia, United States
- Genres: Southern hip hop
- Occupation: Record producers
- Years active: 2001–2013
- Members: Teeth Malloy; Nikke Broadway

The Beat Bullies are an American Atlanta-based Southern hip hop production duo composed of record producers Nsilo "Teeth Malloy" Reddick and Nicholas "Nikki Broadway" Sherwood.

They were affiliated with Big Boi, producing songs for several Dungeon Family-related projects, such as Slimm Calhoun's The Skinny, Killer Mike's Monster and Pl3dge, and the Purple Ribbon All-Stars' single "Kryptonite (I'm on It)" from Got Purp? Vol. 2, as well as songs for fellow Southern rapper Gangsta Boo, Midwestern rapper Nelly, and latin rock band Santana.

The duo linked up with Houston-based rapper Chamillionaire since producing the majority of his debut solo album The Sound of Revenge, including single "Grown and Sexy". They went on to produce three songs from his sophomore album Ultimate Victory and one song each for his extended plays Ammunition and Reignfall. In 2015, member Nsilo Reddick and Chamillionaire started working with Upfront Ventures.

== Career ==
Longtime friends and collaborators, Reddick and Sherwood met while students at Morehouse College in Atlanta. Reddick, originally from Savannah, Georgia, grew up as a classically trained pianist, who played tenor saxophone and drums in his middle and high school bands. Sherwood was raised in Boston with an art background, and started using turntables in high school. At the time they met, they were individually producing for various Atlanta University Center artists, and subsequently began working together as the Beat Bullies.

== Notable productions ==
Year	Song	Artist(s)	Album	Notes
2001	"It Ain't Easy"	Slimm Calhoun, Backbone	The Skinny	prod. by Teeth Malloy, co-prod. by Earthtone III
2001	"The Skinny"	Slimm Calhoun	The Skinny	co-prod. by Earthtone III
2003	"Sex, Drugs, Rap & Roll"	Killer Mike	Monster	prod. by Teeth Malloy
2003	"Where They Hang"	Gangsta Boo	Enquiring Minds II: The Soap Opera	
2004	"She Don't Know My Name"	Nelly, Snoop Dogg, Ronald Isley	Suit	prod. w/ Big Boi
2005	"My Man"	Santana, Big Boi, Mary J. Blige	All That I Am	prod. w/ Big Boi
2005	"Kryptonite (I'm on It)"	Purple Ribbon All-Stars	Got Purp? Vol. 2	
2005	"The Sound of Revenge (Intro)"	Chamillionaire	The Sound of Revenge	
2005	"Southern Takeover"	Chamillionaire, Killer Mike, Pastor Troy	The Sound of Revenge	
2005	"Radio Interruption"	Chamillionaire	The Sound of Revenge	
2005	"Grown and Sexy"	Chamillionaire	The Sound of Revenge	
2005	"Think I'm Crazy"	Chamillionaire, Natalie	The Sound of Revenge	
2005	"Peepin' Me"	Chamillionaire	The Sound of Revenge	
2007	"Rock Star"	Chamillionaire, Lil Wayne	Ultimate Victory	
2007	"The Ultimate Vacation"	Chamillionaire	Ultimate Victory	
2007	"I Think I Love You"	Chamillionaire	Ultimate Victory	
2011	"God in the Building II"	Killer Mike	Pl3dge	
2012	"On My Way"	Chamillionaire	Ammunition	
2013	"Eatin'"	Chamillionaire	Reignfall	
