= Supa Nate =

American rapper

- Also known as: Nathaniel
- Born: Nathaniel Elder
- Origin: Atlanta, Georgia, US
- Died: January 25, 2023 (aged 48)
- Genres: Southern hip hop
- Occupation: Rapper
- Years active: 1998–2010s
- Member of: Dungeon Family; Konkrete

Nathaniel Elder, better known by his stage name Supa Nate, was one of the rappers in the hip-hop group Konkrete and a member of Dungeon Family. He grew up in Atlanta, where he attended Banneker High School. He made his debut in 1998 on "Nathaniel" on Outkast's Aquemini, in which he delivered an original rap, sans back beat, from a jail telephone. The lyrics reference his wish to get out of jail so he can "grab a mic and bust a flow". After his release, Nate joined with rappers C-Bone and James "Lil' Brotha" Patton to form Konkrete.

Cynt The Shrimp split from Konkrete's Nathaniel "Supa Nate" Elder in December 2006. Cynthia, Cynt The Shrimp, was featured on Big Boi's Got Purp? Vol. 2, "Purple Ribbon (Interlude)".

Nathaniel died on 25 January 2023.

== Featured on (solo) ==
- OutKast's Aquemini, "Nathaniel (Known As Nathaniel Then)"
- OutKast's Tomb of the Boom, "Supa Nate"

=== As Konkrete ===
- Dungeon Family's Even in Darkness, Curtains (Of 2nd Generation) (Known As Nathaniel Then)
- Purple Ribbon Records' Got that Purp?, Beef
- Purple Ribbon Records' Got that Purp?, Whatcha Wanna Do
- Purple Ribbon Records' Got that Purp?, D-Boi Stance Feat Big Boi
- Purple Ribbon Records' Got that Purp?, Hard in the Paint
- Big Boi's Speakerboxxx/The Love Below, Tomb of the Boom
- Purple Ribbon Records' Got Purp? Vol. 2, Shit Ya Drawers
- Purple Ribbon Records' Got Purp? Vol. 2, Lovin' This
