= The Skinny (album) =

Studio album by Slimm Calhoun
- Released: April 10, 2001
- Genre: Hip hop
- Length: 1:07:49
- Label: Aquemini; Elektra
- Producer: Butta; Carl Mo; Chronic Chris; Cutmaster Swiff; Earthtone III; Jeminesse Smith; Organized Noize; Ruben James; Swift C; The Beat Bullies

Singles from The Skinny
- 1. "It's OK" Released: July 11, 2000

Professional ratings
Review scores
Source	Rating
AllMusic	3/5 stars
Entertainment Weekly	C+
NME	5/5 stars
RapReviews	7.5/10
The Guardian	4/5 stars
The Village Voice	(1-star Honorable Mention)

The Skinny is the debut solo studio album by American rapper and Dungeon Family member Slimm Calhoun. It was released on April 10, 2001, via Aquemini/Elektra Records. Production was handled by Earthtone III, The Beat Bullies, Butta, Carl Mo, Chronic Chris, Cutmaster Swiff, Jeminesse Smith, Organized Noize, Ruben James and Swift C. It features guest appearances from André 3000, Backbone, Big Boi, ChamDon, Killer Mike and Sleepy Brown, as well as cameo appearances from Dana Lewis, Joi, Lil' Will, Missy Ward, Mr. DJ, Screechy Peach, Sniper Unit and Supa Nate. The album peaked at number 78 on the Billboard 200 and number 19 on the Top R&B/Hip-Hop Albums in the United States. Its lead single "It's OK" made it to No. 35 on the Hot R&B/Hip-Hop Songs and topped the Hot Rap Songs chart.

== Track listing ==
No.	Title	Writer(s)	Producer(s)	Length
1.	"Intro"		Earthtone III	1:12
2.	"Red Clay"	Brian Loving; André Benjamin; Antwan Patton; David Sheats	Earthtone III	3:26
3.	"This Young G"	Loving; Jamahr Williams; Jeminesse Smith; Benjamin; Patton; Sheats	Slimm Jim; Earthtone III (co.)	3:14
4.	"Well" (featuring Killer Mike)	Loving; Michael Render; Archie Hall	Cutmaster Swiff	4:36
5.	"Time Lock"	Loving; Benjamin; Patton; Sheats	Earthtone III	4:13
6.	"It Ain't Easy" (featuring Backbone)	Loving; Williams; Nsilo Kharonde Reddick; Benjamin; Patton; Sheats	Nsilo Reddick; Earthtone III (co.)	4:22
7.	"Dirt Work" (featuring Big Boi)	Loving; Patton; Robert Louis Crawford; Benjamin; Sheats	Butta; Earthtone III (co.)	3:43
8.	"It's OK" (featuring André 3000)	Loving; Benjamin; Cedric Barnett; Sheats; Vasco Whiteside; William L. Jones; Benjamin	Earthtone III	3:33
9.	"The Skinny"	Loving; Joi Gilliam; Reddick; Nicholas Sherwood; Benjamin; Patton; Sheats; Gert Bettens; Sam Bettens	The Beat Bullies; Earthtone III (co.)	3:39
10.	"The Cut Song"	Loving; Carlton Mahone	Carl Mo	4:17
11.	"All da Hustlers"	Loving; Barnett; Benjamin; Patton; Sheats; Kevin Brown	Cedric "Swift C" Barnett; Earthtone III (co.)	3:36
12.	"Lil' Buddy (Til Death Do Us Part)"	Loving; Benjamin; Patton; Sheats	Earthtone III	4:08
13.	"Characters"	Loving; Benjamin; Patton; Sheats	Earthtone III	4:02
14.	"Worldy Ways"	Loving; Benjamin; Patton; Sheats	Earthtone III	4:30
15.	"On Tha Grind"	Loving; Nathaniel Elder; Chris Blanding; Benjamin; Patton; Sheats	Chronic Chris; Earthtone III (co.)	3:54
16.	"How Much Can I" (featuring Sleepy Brown)	Patrick Brown; Ruben James; Benjamin; Patton; Sheats	Ruben James; Earthtone III (co.)	4:55
17.	"Piece of Tha Pie" (featuring ChamDon)	Loving; Corey Q. Laster; Gregory Tyler Martin; P. Brown; Ray Murray; Rico Wade	Organized Noize	6:29
Total length:				1:07:49

== Personnel ==
- Brian "Slimm Calhoun" Loving – vocals
- Michael "Killer Mike" Render – vocals (track 4)
- Jamahr "Backbone" Williams – vocals (track 6), backing vocals (track 3)
- Antwan "Big Boi" Patton – vocals (track 7), backing vocals (track 10), producer (tracks: 1, 2, 5, 8, 12–14), co-producer (tracks: 3, 6, 7, 9, 11, 15, 16), executive producer
- Andre "André 3000" Benjamin – vocals (track 8), backing vocals (tracks: 4, 5), guitar (track 6), producer (tracks: 1, 2, 5, 8, 12–14), co-producer (tracks: 3, 6, 7, 9, 11, 15, 16), executive producer
- Patrick "Sleepy" Brown – vocals (track 16), producer (track 17)
- Greg "G-Rock" Martin – vocals (track 17), backing vocals (track 2)
- C-Smooth – vocals (track 17)
- Joi Gilliam – backing vocals (tracks: 3, 9)
- Myrna "Screechy Peach" Crenshaw – backing vocals (tracks: 3, 13)
- Dana Lewis – backing vocals (tracks: 3, 14)
- David "Mr. DJ" Sheats – backing vocals (tracks: 4, 8, 10), producer (tracks: 1, 2, 5, 8, 12–14), co-producer (tracks: 3, 6, 7, 9, 11, 15, 16), executive producer, A&R
- Cedric "Swift C/Lucky Calhoun" Barnett – backing vocals (track 8), producer (track 11)
- Vasco "Big L/Pauly Calhoun" Whiteside – backing vocals (track 8)
- Lil' Will – backing vocals (track 8)
- Missy Ward – backing vocals (track 10)
- Nathaniel "Supa Nate" Elder – additional vocals (track 15)
- Marvin "Chanz" Parkman – keyboards (tracks: 2–9, 13–17)
- Preston Crump – bass (tracks: 3, 5, 8, 9, 12, 13, 16)
- Ruben James – lead guitar (track 4), guitar & keyboards & producer (track 16)
- Rick Hinkle – electric guitar (track 8)
- Eric Armstrong – horns (track 8)
- Kebbi Williams – horns (track 8)
- David "Whild" Brown – guitar (track 9)
- Richard "Rip" Goger – guitar (track 9)
- Donny Mathis – guitar (tracks: 12, 13, 14), guitar solo (track 16)
- Levi Young – bass (track 14)
- Victor Alexander – drums (track 16)
- Omar Phillips – percussion (track 16)
- Paul – bass (track 17)
- Jeminesse "Slimm Jim" Smith – producer (track 3)
- Archie "Swiffman" Hall – producer (track 4)
- Nsilo Kharonde Reddick – producer (tracks: 6, 9)
- Robert Louis "Butta" Crawford Jr. – producer (track 7)
- Nicholas Sherwood – producer (track 9)
- Carlton "Carl Mo" Mahone – producer (track 10)
- "Chronic" Chris Blanding – producer (track 15)
- Ray Murray – producer (track 17)
- Rico Wade – producer (track 17)
- Michael "Blue" Williams – executive producer
- Gregory Burke – art direction
- Jonathan Mannion – photography
- Regina Davenport – A&R

== Charts ==
Chart (2001)	Peak position
US Billboard 200	78
US Top R&B/Hip-Hop Albums (Billboard)	19
