= Carl Mo =

American songwriter, record producer and remixer

- Birth name: Carlton Mahone Jr.
- Also known as: Carl Mo
- Origin: Atlanta, Georgia, United States
- Genres: Hip hop
- Occupations: Songwriter; record producer; remixer
- Years active: 1995–2007
- Formerly of: Ghost Town DJ's

Carlton Mahone Jr., professionally known by his pseudonym Carl Mo, is an American songwriter, record producer and remixer from Atlanta. He co-wrote and co-produced Ghost Town DJ's 1996 single "My Boo" and Outkast 2003 single "The Way You Move". Outkast albums which he produced were nominated twice for a Grammy Award for Album of the Year for Stankonia and Speakerboxxx/The Love Below, succeeding with the latter. As a producer, he also produced songs for Pastor Troy, Slimm Calhoun, Big Boi, Sleepy Brown and Boyz n da Hood, and re-mixings songs for K. P. & Envyi, Jagged Edge and Omarion.

== Selected production discography ==
Year	Song	Artist(s)	Album(s)	Contributions	Notes
1996	"My Boo"	Ghost Town DJ's	So So Def Bass All-Stars	Songwriter, co-producer	prod. by Kool Kollie
1996	"Let It Burn"	Playa Poncho	So So Def Bass All-Stars	Songwriter, producer	prod. w/ The Dynamik Duo
1996	"My Boo (Quiet Storm Mix)"	Ghost Town DJ's	—	Songwriter, remixer	remixed w/ Lil Jon
1997	"Apple Pie"	Virgo	So So Def Bass All-Stars Vol. II	Songwriter, producer	
1997	"My Boo (Dynamik Duo '88 Remix)"	Ghost Town DJ's	So So Def Bass All-Stars Vol. II	Songwriter, producer	remixed by The Dynamik Duo
1997	"Slick Partna"	Virgo	So So Def Bass All-Stars Vol. II	Songwriter, producer	
1998	"When Will I See You Smile Again?"	Ricky Bell	So So Def Bass All-Stars Volume III	Producer	
1998	"Swing My Way (Remix)"	K. P. & Envyi	Music From the Motion Picture Can't Hardly Wait	Additional producer, remixer, vocal arranger	prod. by Mixzo
1998	"Bass Is Lo"	Zae'	Rhythm & Quad 166 Vol. 1	Producer	
1998	"Don't Wanna Lose Your Love"	Babydoll	Rhythm & Quad 166 Vol. 1	Producer	
1999	"He Can't Love U (Carl Mo Remix)"	Jagged Edge	—	Remixer	
2000	"Frame Me!"	Pastor Troy	I Am D.S.G.B.	Producer	
2000	"Gangsta Shit"	Outkast, Slimm Calhoun, C-Bone, T-Mo	Stankonia	Songwriter, producer	co-prod. by Earthtone III
2001	"Promise (Carl Mo Club Mix)"	Jagged Edge	—	Drums, remixer	
2001	"The Cut Song"	Slimm Calhoun	The Skinny	Songwriter, producer	
2001	"I'm Made"	Pastor Troy	Face Off	Songwriter, producer	
2001	"Vica Versa"	Pastor Troy, Peter the Disciple	Face Off	Songwriter, producer	
2002	"Vica Versa (Remix)"	Pastor Troy, Peter the Disciple	Universal Soldier	Producer	
2003	"The Way You Move"	Outkast, Sleepy Brown	Speakerboxxx/The Love Below	Songwriter, producer	co-prod. by Big Boi
2003	"The Rooster"	Outkast	Speakerboxxx/The Love Below	Songwriter, producer	co-prod. by Big Boi
2005	"808"	Big Boi, Big Gee, Bun B, G-Rock	Got Purp? Vol. 2	Songwriter, producer	
2005	"Shit Ya Drawers"	Konkrete	Got Purp? Vol. 2	Songwriter, producer	co-prod. by Big Boi
2005	"O (Carl Mo Remix)"	Omarion	—	Remixer	
2006	"Come Dance with Me"	Sleepy Brown	Mr. Brown	Songwriter, drum programmer, producer, horns arranger	
2007	"Bite Down"	Boyz n da Hood	Back Up n da Chevy	Songwriter, Midi keyboards, drum programmer, producer	

== Awards and nominations ==
Year	Nominee / work	Award	Result	Ref.
2004	Speakerboxxx/The Love Below	Grammy Award for Album of the Year	Won	
2002	Stankonia	Grammy Award for Album of the Year	Nominated	
