= Got Purp? Vol. 2 =

2005 album by Big Boy

Big Boi Presents... Got Purp? Vol. II

Studio album by Big Boi
- Released: November 22, 2005
- Recorded: 2005
- Genre: Southern hip-hop
- Length: 1:12:03
- Label: Purple Ribbon; Virgin; EMI
- Producer: B-Don; Carl Mo; Charles "K.C." Sanders; C.K.P.; Janelle Monáe; Mr. DJ; Nate "Rocket" Wonder; Organized Noize; Swiffman; The Beat Bullies; The Booom Boize

Big Boi chronology
Got That Purp (2005)	Big Boi Presents... Got Purp? Vol. II (2005)

Singles from Big Boi Presents... Got Purp? Vol. II
- 1. "Kryptonite (I'm on It)" Released: January 6, 2006

Big Boi Presents... Got Purp? Vol. II is the only studio album by American hip-hop collective Purple Ribbon All-Stars. It was released on November 22, 2005, via Purple Ribbon/Virgin Records. Production was handled by B-Don, Carl Mo, Charles "K.C." Sanders, C.K.P., DJ Cutmaster Swiff, Janelle Monáe, Mr. DJ, Nate "Rocket" Wonder, Organized Noize, The Beat Bullies and The Booom Boize. It features contributions from Dungeon Family members Big Boi, Killer Mike, Konkrete, Scar, Sleepy Brown, Janelle Monáe, Goodie Mob, Bubba Sparxxx, Big Gee, Cool Breeze, Donkey Boy, Fonzworth Bentley, G-Rock, Lil' Co and Rock D., as well as guest appearances from Bun B and Poo Bear.

The album debuted at number 49 on the Billboard 200 and number 5 on the Top R&B/Hip-Hop Albums in the United States. Its only single, "Kryptonite (I'm on It)", reached number 35 on the Billboard Hot 100, number 8 on the Hot R&B/Hip-Hop Songs and went certified Gold by the Recording Industry Association of America.

The album serves as a sequel to 2005 mixtape Got That Purp. The song "Hold On" marks the first Goodie Mob reunion featuring all four original members since the quartet's 1999 World Party album and Dungeon Family's 2001 Even in Darkness.

== Critical reception ==
Professional ratings
Review scores
Source	Rating
AllMusic	2.5/5 stars
Entertainment Weekly	B
Pitchfork	7.2/10
RapReviews	7.5/10

AllMusic's Andy Kellman felt that: "Despite a handful of decent cuts, most copies of this non-event will be filed away and quickly forgotten. The contributors are clearly saving their best material for their respective albums." Raymond Fiore of Entertainment Weekly wrote that despite lacking in star quality throughout the album, he felt that the "imaginative Dirty South productions" on "Lettin' Go" and "Me, My Baby and My Cadillac" made the detraction "a forgivable offense." One Line of RapReviews said: ""Got Purp? Vol. 2" manages to be one of the best releases so far in a disappointing 2005. Big Boi proves that he's ready and willing to move on to the next stage of his musical life, taking the power seat like a certain Brooklyn lyricist-turned-president. [...] The rookie emcees need some development, but with a supporting cast like this, they should be ready in no time."

== Track listing ==
No.	Title	Writer(s)	Producer(s)	Length
1.	"Intro" (performed by Big Boi)			0:31
2.	"Dungeon Family Dedication" (performed by Killer Mike)	Michael Render; Antwan Patton; André Benjamin; Patrick Brown; Ray Murray; Rico Wade; Clarence Burke; Curtis Mayfield; Gregory Fowler	Brandon "B-Don" Matthews; The Booom Boize	2:02
3.	"Kryptolude (Interlude)" (performed by Big Boi)			0:47
4.	"Kryptonite (I'm on It)" (performed by Big Boi, Killer Mike, BlackOwned C-Bone and Rock D.)	A. Patton; Render; Cory Andrews; Kristopher Bailey; Nicholas Sherwood; Nsilo Reddick	The Beat Bullies	4:32
5.	"Campbellton Road (Interlude)"			0:50
6.	"Me, My Baby and My Cadillac" (performed by Sleepy Brown)	Brown; Berry Gordy; Freddie Perren; Alphonzo Mizell; Deke Richards	Sleepy Brown	3:51
7.	"Purple Ribbon (Interlude)"			0:54
8.	"Body Rock" (performed by Lil' Co, Killer Mike and DonkeeBoy)	Clarence Montgomery; Render; Quavious Giles; Howard White; Mike Davis; Nico Solis	C.K.P.	4:24
9.	"My Chrome" (performed by Killer Mike, Big Boi and Poo Bear)	Render; A. Patton; Jason Boyd; David Sheats; Jeminesse Smith	Mr. DJ; Big Boi (co.); Slimm Jim (co.)	3:39
10.	"U Got Me!!!" (performed by Scar and Big Boi)	Terrence Smith; A. Patton; Nathaniel Irvin III	Nate "Rocket" Wonder	4:15
11.	"Papa Doc (Interlude)"			0:45
12.	"Claremont Lounge" (performed by Bubba Sparxxx, Killer Mike and Coool Breeez)	Warren Mathis; Render; Frederick Bell; Brown; Murray; Wade	Organized Noize	4:08
13.	"Time Will Reveal" (performed by Janelle Monáe)	Eldra Patrick DeBarge; Etterlene Jordan	Cutmaster Swiff	3:32
14.	"Mayonnaise Mouth (Interlude)" (performed by Scar)			1:26
15.	"Hold On" (performed by Goodie Mob)	Cameron Gipp; Robert Barnett; Thomas Callaway; Willie Knighton; Brown; Murray; Wade	Organized Noize	5:09
16.	"808" (performed by Big Boi, Bun B, Big Gee and G-Rock)	A. Patton; Bernard Freeman; Miguel Scott; Greg Martin; Carlton Mahone	Carl Mo	4:17
17.	"Fonzsworth (Interlude)" (performed by Fonzworth Bentley)			0:58
18.	"What Is This?" (performed by Scar and CeeLo Green)	Smith; Callaway; Charles Sanders; Ken Fambro; Courtney Sills	Charles "K.C." Sanders	4:02
19.	"Shit Ya Drawers" (performed by Konkrete)	Andrews; James Patton; Nathaniel Elder; Mahone; A. Hall	Carl Mo; Big Boi (co.)	3:41
20.	"Lettin' Go" (performed by Janelle Monáe)	Janelle Monáe Robinson; Irvin III; Charles Joseph II; Smith	Nate "Rocket" Wonder; Janelle Monáe	4:28
21.	"Konkrete (Interlude)" (performed by Konkrete)			0:58
22.	"Lovin' This" (performed by Konkrete)	Andrews; J. Patton; Elder; Boyd; White; Davis; Solis; Sills; Miguel Atilio Boccadoro Hernández; Graciela Beatriz Carballo Villanueva	C.K.P.	4:55
23.	"Outro"			3:30
24.	"Bubba Intro" (performed by Big Boi)			0:23
25.	"The Otherside (Snippet)" (performed by Bubba Sparxxx)			0:32
26.	"Represent (Snippet)" (performed by Bubba Sparxxx)			0:32
27.	"Ain't Life Grand (Snippet)" (performed by Bubba Sparxxx)			3:02
Total length:				1:12:03

Sample credits

- Track 2 samples "Aquemini" and "Two Dope Boyz (In A Cadillac)" by Outkast.
- Track 6 samples "Maybe Tomorrow" by The Jackson 5.
- Track 22 samples "Siempre Te Amaré" by Amanda Miguel.

== Personnel ==
- Antwan "Big Boi" Patton – vocals (tracks: 1, 3, 4, 9, 10, 16, 24), co-producer (tracks: 9, 19), arranger (tracks: 9, 22), executive producer, presenter
- Michael "Killer Mike" Render – vocals (tracks: 2, 4, 8, 9, 12)
- Corey "C-Bone" Andrews – vocals (tracks: 4, 19, 21, 22)
- Rocky "Rock D." Dennis – vocals (track 4)
- Patrick "Sleepy" Brown – vocals (track 6), backing vocals (track 16), additional vocals (track 25), programming (track 6), producer (tracks: 6, 12, 15)
- Lil' Co – vocals (track 8)
- DonkeeBoy – vocals (track 8)
- Debra Killings – backing vocals (track 9), bass (track 22)
- Jason "Poo Bear" Boyd – vocals (track 9), additional vocals (track 22)
- Terrence "Scar" Smith – vocals (tracks: 10, 14, 18), additional vocals (track 27), arranger (track 10)
- Warren "Bubba Sparxxx" Mathis – vocals (tracks: 12, 25–27)
- Frederick "Cool Breeze" Bell – vocals (track 12)
- Janelle Monáe – vocals (tracks: 13, 20), percussion & producer (track 20)
- Courtney Jackson – backing vocals (track 13)
- Thomas "CeeLo Green" Callaway – vocals (tracks: 15, 18)
- Cameron "Big Gipp" Gipp – vocals (track 15)
- Robert "T-Mo" Barnett – vocals (track 15)
- Willie "Khujo" Knighton – vocals (track 15)
- Miguel "Big Gee" Scott – vocals (track 16)
- Greg "G-Rock" Martin – vocals (track 16)
- Bernard "Bun B" Freeman – vocals (track 16)
- Derrick "Fonzworth Bentley" Watkins – vocals (track 17)
- James "Lil' Brotha" Patton – vocals (tracks: 19, 21, 22)
- Nathaniel "Supa Nate" Elder – vocals (tracks: 19, 21, 22)
- Giant – backing vocals (track 19)
- Charles "Chuck Lightning" Joseph II – backing vocals (track 20)
- Delvin Franklin – backing vocals (track 20)
- Regina Davenport – backing vocals (track 20)
- Tamika Brady – backing vocals (track 20)
- Nathaniel 'Nate "Rocket" Wonder' Irvin III – backing vocals (track 20), vibraphone & producer (tracks: 10, 20), guitar & percussion (track 10), Fender Rhodes piano & additional percussion (track 20), arranger (track 10), strings arranger (track 20)
- Terrence Brown – keyboards (track 4)
- Kevin Kendrick – baby grand piano (track 4)
- Marvin "Chanz" Parkman – piano (track 6)
- Ray Murray – drums (track 15), recording (track 6), producer (tracks: 12, 15)
- Howard White – keyboards & programming (track 8), producer (tracks: 8, 22)
- Jeminesse "Slimm Jim" Smith – keyboards & co-producer (track 9)
- James "Mello Capone" Hollins – keyboards (track 9)
- Jason Freeman – horns (tracks: 9, 22)
- Jerry Freeman – horns (tracks: 9, 22)
- Darian Emory – horns (track 9)
- Richard Owens – horns (track 9)
- Andre Bowman – bass (track 10)
- The Wondaland String Ensemble – strings (tracks: 10, 20)
- Archie "Swiffman" Hall – scratches (tracks: 2, 13, 16), programming & producer (track 13)
- Ben Cunningham – guitar (track 18)
- Ken Fambro – keyboards (track 18)
- Donny Mathis – guitar (tracks: 19, 22), bass (track 19)
- Brandon D. "B-Don" Matthews – producer (track 2), additional programming (track 4), recording (tracks: 2, 4, 9, 18)
- The Booom Boize – producer (track 2)
- Nsilo "Teeth Malloy" Reddick – drum programming & producer (track 4)
- Nicholas "Nikki Broadway" Sherwood – drum programming & producer (track 4)
- Mike Davis – producer & recording (tracks: 8, 22)
- Nico Solis – producer (tracks: 8, 22), programming (track 22)
- David "Mr. DJ" Sheats – producer (track 9)
- Rico Wade – producer (tracks: 12, 15)
- Carlton "Carl Mo" Mahone Jr. – producer (tracks: 16, 19)
- Charles "K.C." Sanders – producer, programming, recording & mixing (track 18)
- Josh Butler – recording (tracks: 2, 22), mixing (track 2)
- Chris Carmouche – recording (tracks: 4, 6, 8–10, 12, 16, 19, 20)
- Devine Evans – recording (tracks: 4, 9, 13, 19, 20)
- Gary Fly – recording (track 4), mixing assistant (track 4), recording assistant (track 9)
- Alex Newell – recording (track 4)
- Sean "Shyboy" Davis – recording (tracks: 6, 12, 15)
- John Frye – recording (tracks: 9, 16, 19), mixing (tracks: 4, 16)
- Jeremiah "The Kid" Edmonds – recording (track 9)
- Vincent Alexander – recording (tracks: 12, 16, 19), recording assistant (track 4), mixing assistant (tracks: 12, 15)
- Carlos Glover – recording (track 15)
- Kelly "Dred" Liebelt – recording (track 18)
- Roman GianArthur Irvin – recording (track 20)
- Mike Guidotti – recording assistant (track 4)
- Ramon Campbell – recording assistant (track 15)
- Tony Terrebonne – recording assistant (track 18)
- Warren Bletcher – recording assistant (tracks: 8, 9, 12, 13, 16, 19, 20, 22), mixing assistant (tracks: 2, 9, 10, 13, 16, 22)
- Aric Rosenberg – recording assistant (tracks: 6, 8–10, 22)
- Phil Tan – mixing (tracks: 6, 10, 20)
- Vincent Dilorenzo – mixing (tracks: 8, 19, 20)
- Mark "Exit" Goodchild – mixing (tracks: 12, 15)
- Mike Tsarfati – mixing assistant (tracks: 2, 19, 22)
- Rob Skipworth – mixing assistant (track 6)
- Morgan Garcia – mixing assistant (tracks: 8, 19)
- Laura Harrington – mixing assistant (track 18)
- Bernie Grundman – mastering
- Jonathan Mannion – photography

== Charts ==
=== Weekly charts ===
Chart (2005)	Peak position
US Billboard 200	49
US Top R&B/Hip-Hop Albums (Billboard)	5

=== Year-end charts ===
Chart (2006)	Position
US Top R&B/Hip-Hop Albums (Billboard)	66

== See also ==
- Got That Purp Vol.1
