= Stankonia =

Studio album by Outkast
- Released: October 31, 2000
- Recorded: 1999–2000
- Studios: Stankonia Recording Tree Sound Studios, Atlanta; A&M Studios, Los Angeles
- Genres: Southern hip-hop; progressive rap; funk; psychedelic rap
- Length: 73:07
- Labels: LaFace; Arista
- Producers: David Sheats; Organized Noize; Carl Mo

Outkast chronology
Aquemini (1998)	Stankonia (2000)	Big Boi and Dre Present... Outkast (2001)

Singles from Stankonia
- 1. "B.O.B" Released: August 29, 2000; 2. "Ms. Jackson" Released: October 24, 2000; 3. "So Fresh, So Clean" Released: March 13, 2001

Stankonia is the fourth studio album by the American hip hop duo Outkast, released on October 31, 2000, by LaFace Records and Arista Records. The album was recorded in the duo's recently purchased Atlanta recording facility, Stankonia Studios, which allowed for fewer time and recording constraints, and featured production work from Earthtone III (a production team consisting of Outkast and Mr. DJ) and longtime collaborators Organized Noize.

For the follow-up to their 1998 album Aquemini, the duo worked to create an expansive and experimental musical aesthetic, incorporating a diverse array of styles including funk, rave music, psychedelia, gospel, and rock within a Dirty South-oriented hip-hop context. During the recording sessions, André 3000 began moving beyond traditional rapping in favor of a more melodic vocal style, an approach to which Big Boi and several other producers were initially unaccustomed. Lyrically, the duo touched upon a wide range of subject matters, including sexuality, politics, misogyny, African-American culture, parenthood, and introspection. Stankonia featured appearances from a variety of local musicians discovered by the group while they were visiting clubs in their native city of Atlanta, Georgia.

Stankonia received universal acclaim from music critics upon its release and has since been regarded by many to be one of the greatest hip hop albums of all time. The album debuted at number two on the Billboard 200 chart, selling over 525,000 copies in its first week. It was supported by three singles: "B.O.B", "Ms. Jackson", and "So Fresh, So Clean"; "Ms. Jackson" became the group's first single to reach number one on the Billboard Hot 100. At the 44th Annual Grammy Awards, Outkast won Best Rap Album for Stankonia and Best Rap Performance by a Duo or Group for "Ms. Jackson". In 2003, the album was ranked number 359 on Rolling Stone's list of the "500 Greatest Albums of All Time", 361 in a 2012 revision, and 64 in a 2020 reboot of the list. A re-issue of the album for its twentieth anniversary with previously unreleased remixes was released on October 30, 2020. Another re-issue for the twenty-fifth anniversary was released on October 31, 2025.

== Background ==
The flag that is featured on the album cover of Stankonia

In 1998, OutKast released their third album Aquemini to critical acclaim while diversifying and expanding their sound. The album's success also attracted national attention to the Southern hip hop scene. Having collaborated on the Aquemini track "Skew It on the Bar-B", the Wu-Tang Clan member Raekwon later recalled the duo's impact at the time: "Before that, the South just wasn't played in New York. But that song was hot, the flows was crazy. The cycle changed. It really opened up the door for Southern rappers."

In March 1998, OutKast purchased a studio near Northside Drive in Atlanta. Formerly owned by the R&B singer Bobby Brown, the studio was the first place the duo had ever recorded vocals together – on a remix of TLC's "What About Your Friends" (1992) – and held sentimental value for them. Outkast named the studio "Stankonia", a word created by André 3000 as a portmanteau of the words "stank" (a slang synonym for "funky") and "Plutonia" (the title of a poster in his bedroom depicting a futuristic city). As he explained, "Stankonia is this place I imagined where you can open yourself up and be free to express anything".

== Recording ==
The recording of Stankonia began in the spring of 1999 and lasted for about a year. Owning a studio helped the group expand creatively, as the duo did not need to worry about time constraints that would occur with a rented studio. André 3000 observed, "You can sit there and fuck with just a kick and a snare all day long if you want to ... You're not working on the clock. Really, you're just working on your mind." Big Boi spent the majority of the recording time in the studio, while André 3000 worked at home, creating beats and experimenting with an acoustic guitar. One song that came from a jam session on the guitar was "Ms. Jackson", the album's second single. André 3000 also created song lyrics by writing words on the walls of his home: "I had planned to paint my house anyway; writing on the walls was just something I would do". One stray lyric on his wall eventually developed into "Gasoline Dreams".

Much of the album was formulated during "vibe sessions" in which the group and producers would visit clubs in downtown Atlanta, select performers they saw, and invite them to the studio. They would then "sit around, smoke a few, drink a few", and create ideas for new songs. However, recording sessions became difficult as André 3000 grew tired of rapping on songs, which made Big Boi and the producers uneasy about how the music would sound. To maintain musical cohesion with Big Boi while continuing to expand his vocal palette, André decided to combine rapping with soul-inspired crooning, which had a major influence on Stankonia's sound. "Snappin & Trappin'" features a guest appearance from the then-unknown rapper Killer Mike. The rapper noted that while working with Outkast, he used the opportunity to try to "compete" with the duo to improve his rapping skills. Big Boi was impressed with Killer Mike's abilities, noting, "When I first heard him spit, his voice was just so commanding. He's a very intelligent guy."

== Composition ==
=== Music and style ===
"B.O.B. (Bombs Over Baghdad)"
The song "B.O.B. (Bombs Over Baghdad)" contains elements of drum and bass music in addition to combining guitars, organs, and gospel vocals. André 3000 and Big Boi's raps keep pace with the quick tempo of the track.

While OutKast's previous albums were considered to be laid-back, mellow efforts, Stankonia contains faster, more high-energy tempos, partially to reflect the "chaotic times" at the end of the 20th century. The group took note of new, harder drugs hitting the hip-hop scene and teenagers using ecstasy, cocaine, and methamphetamine. Big Boi reflected, "Niggas living this life at a fast speed don't know what's going on around them. If you live fast, you gonna come out of here real fast, so the music need to show that." While recording Stankonia, the band refrained from listening to hip-hop, "That music was starting to sound real comfortable. There wasn't any adventure to it." Instead, the duo drew influence from musicians such as Jimi Hendrix, Little Richard, Prince, and George Clinton, as well as Clinton's Parliament-Funkadelic collective. However, the band refrained from producing a throwback sound with the record and instead hoped to utilize these influences in a modern, experimental fashion. André 3000 stated that "I don't want this to be the generation that went back to '70s rock. You gotta take it and do new things with it."

On Stankonia, OutKast experimented with a wide variety of musical genres. According to M. Matos of Vibe, Stankonia "turned the South's predominantly reclined hip-hop sound into something freaky and menacing." AllMusic's Steve Huey said their experimentation resulted in "a trippy sort of techno-psychedelic funk". "B.O.B" features "jittery drum'n'bass rhythms" and has been classified as a "stylistic tour de force" combining "Hendrix-ian" guitars, organs, and gospel vocals. On the track, André 3000 and Big Boi employ a "frantic" flow to keep pace with the song's high-speed tempo, which runs at 155 beats per minute. "Humble Mumble" is a salsa-influenced track that evolves into a club groove, while "Ms. Jackson" "marries early Prince with late P-Funk". The smooth melodies of "I'll Call B4 I Cum" have also been likened to Prince. "Gasoline Dreams" has been classified as a "gritty rock scorcher" comparable to the work of Public Enemy. David Bry of Vibe detected a "polished 80's pimp strut" in "So Fresh, So Clean" and an "appreciative, fat-ass bounce" in "We Luv Deez Hoes". The album ends with three psychedelic-influenced tracks, "Toilet Tisha", "Slum Beautiful", and "Stankonia (Stank Love)". "Stankonia (Stank Love)" has also been described as an "homage of sorts" to gospel choirs and '60s doo-wop groups, while also including a slowed down coda reminiscent of chopped and screwed hip hop.

=== Lyrics ===
I think what's really interesting about this album is that it is absolutely Southern hip-hop, but there is a part that is very conscious of the world around them. You're seeing these dichotomies play out, the sort of balance between mainstream hip-hop and the conscious hip-hop era. We have to remember that, at this particular time, those two genres are starting to branch off. And the thing is, Stankonia encompasses all that.

— Christina Lee, NPR Music

According to Miles Marshall Lewis, Stankonia is among the most "eclectic" of mainstream progressive rap albums from its time. Paul Lester of The Guardian described OutKast's lyrical style on the album by saying, "They are, in a way, post-hip-hop, combining PM Dawn's kooky confections with the Pharcyde's hallucinatory whimsy, Public Enemy's hardline politicking with De La Soul's cartoon dementia, to fashion something vital and new." "Gasoline Dreams" assails the "bling-bling" aspirations of contemporary black culture, instead presenting a sobering view of circumstances upending the world in Outkast's perspective ("I hear that Mother Nature's now on birth control / The coldest pimp be lookin' for somebody to hold"). "Red Velvet" discusses the materialistic nature of the hip hop scene in particular, while "Humble Mumble" addresses critics who make negative assumptions about hip hop based on preconceived notions; André 3000 raps in the song: "I met a critic / I made her shit her draws / She said she thought hip hop was only guns and alcohol / I said oh hell naw / but yet it's that too / You can't discrima-hate cause you done read a book or two."

The album commonly features the words "stank" and "smell" in their blues-rooted definition to mean "low-down, blunt, pungent: a measure of authenticity". Outkast often incorporates word play into the lyrics, including "Humble Mumble"'s references to the "underground smellroad" and chants of "I stank I can, I stank I can", an allusion to The Little Engine That Could. The duo offers encouragement for maturity and facing adversity on the song, beginning with Big Boi's verse advising that "everything in life don't always happen like it's supposed to" while referencing Isaiah 54:17 ("No weapon formed against me prospers"). Meanwhile, André 3000 frames his perspective in the context of progressing African Americans collectively: "The game changes every day, so obsolete is the fist and marches / Speeches only reaches those who already know about it". Erykah Badu, his ex-girlfriend and friend at the time, concludes "Humble Mumble" with a "soaring metaphysical gospel verse that celebrate[s] the circle of life", as pop-culture writer Roni Sarig details.

Much of the album discusses the status of women in the South, and contrasts with the misogynistic attitudes common in hip hop music. In the book Classic Material: The Hip-Hop Album Guide, contributing author Tony Green writes that songs such as "Slum Beautiful" and "Toilet Tisha" "reimagine 'round the way girls, not only as just more than one-dimensional accessories, but as objects of affection with lives and concerns that are worth exploring." In "Toilet Tisha", the duo empathizes with suicidal pregnant teenagers. "Ms. Jackson" is dedicated to the mother of a mother of an out-of-wedlock child, which André 3000 refers to as "the baby's mama's mamas". Inspired by his relationship with Badu, who had given birth to their son Seven, the song serves as an apology to a "baby mama"'s mother for causing her daughter pain. "I'll Call Before I Come" discusses the members putting a woman's sexual needs before their own.

== Commercial performance ==
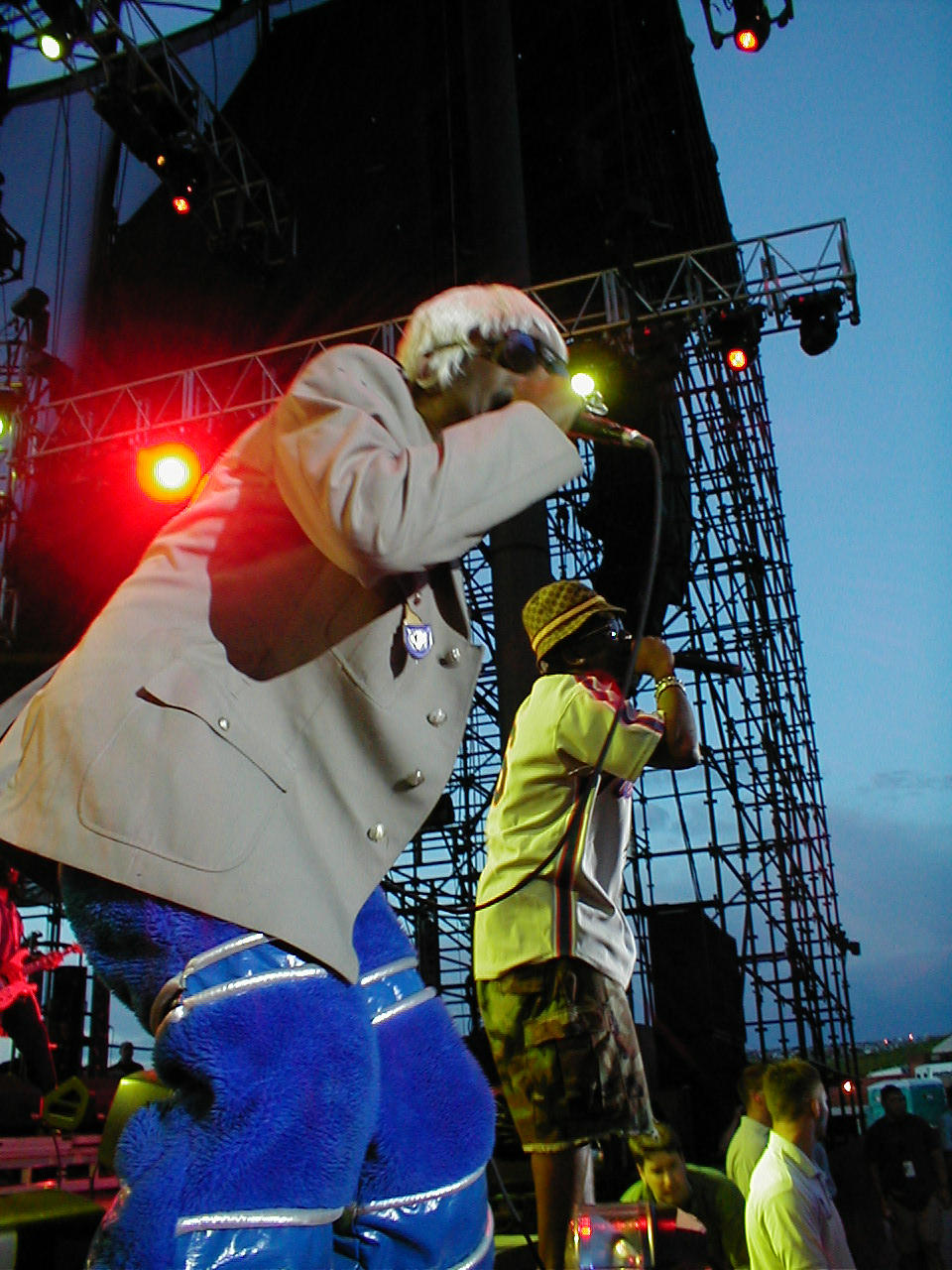
Outkast performing in promotion of Stankonia at the Area Festival in 2001

Stankonia debuted at number two on the Billboard 200 album chart, selling 525,844 copies in its first week, behind Jay-Z's The Dynasty: Roc La Familia; which sold 557,789 copies, and ahead of U2's All That You Can't Leave Behind, which finished in third place in the U.S. The album was certified gold by the Recording Industry Association of America (RIAA) within its first week of release. It also reached number two on the Billboard R&B/Hip-Hop albums chart, remaining on the chart for 45 weeks. By February 2002, the album has sold 3.79 million copies, according to Nielsen SoundScan. On November 3, 2003, Stankonia was certified quadruple platinum, for shipments of four million copies. In Canada, the album peaked at number four, and was certified double platinum by the Canadian Recording Industry Association on September 23, 2003, for shipments of over 200,000 units. The record also became a top ten hit in Germany, Finland, and Norway, reaching the number six, number eight, and number eight spots on the countries' official charts, respectively.

The lead single released from Stankonia, "B.O.B", peaked at number 69 on the R&B/Hip-Hop songs chart. However, the single was banned from many urban Top 40 radio stations due to its title and the subject matter it was assumed to have. On February 3, 2001, "Ms. Jackson" topped the R&B/Hip-Hop songs chart, and then on February 17, the single also reached number one on the Hot 100, remaining on the chart for 22 weeks. The song also reached number 13 on the Billboard Pop Songs chart, as well as number three on the magazine's Radio Songs chart. The third single, "So Fresh, So Clean", peaked at number 30 on the Hot 100, and stayed on the chart for 20 weeks. The single also peaked at number ten on the Billboard R&B/Hip-Hop songs chart, and number 24 on the Radio songs chart.

== Critical reception ==
Professional ratings
Aggregate scores
Source	Rating
Metacritic	95/100
Review scores
Source	Rating
AllMusic	5/5 stars
Alternative Press	5/5
Entertainment Weekly	A
The Guardian	5/5 stars
Los Angeles Times	4/4 stars
NME	4.5/5 stars
Pitchfork	9.5/10
Rolling Stone	4/5 stars
USA Today	4/4 stars
The Village Voice	A

According to the review aggregator Metacritic, Stankonia received "universal acclaim" based on a weighted average score of 95 out of 100 from 20 critic scores. Derek A. Bardowell of NME noted that with Stankonia, OutKast "hit that rare balance of creative eccentricity and mass appeal" and wrote that the album contains "eternal qualities that will unravel in time on an emotional, intellectual and spiritual level." Nathan Brackett of Rolling Stone called the record "one of the best albums of the year", noting that all of the tracks contain "a down-home generosity and accessibility" and that "even the most street-oriented songs have some sort of commentary in them." Tony Green of The Village Voice praised OutKast's "feel for sonics and structure" and stated, "they've moved toward harder, darker textures, in service of song designs that are often disarmingly subtle." Steve Huey of AllMusic commented that, "given the variety of moods, it helps that the album is broken up by brief, usually humorous interludes, which serve as a sort of reset button. It takes a few listens to pull everything together, but given the immense scope, it's striking how few weak tracks there are". Aishah Hight of PopMatters stated, "Within Stankonia, Outkast successfully presented a southern perspective of life, liberty, and the pursuit of happiness. But on the surface, phat beats and pure funk should suffice." Alternative Press commented that "experienced, acclaimed groups rarely make albums as bold and confrontational as Stankonia, because they have too much to lose", but felt that "OutKast don't care", writing that they "coalesced the political and societal challenges of hip hop's past into what is one of the genre's most artistically unorthodox releases so far."

Robert Christgau of The Village Voice observed "more bounce-to-the-ounce and less molasses in the jams, more delight and less braggadocio in the raps", and opined that Big Boi and André 3000's "realism and high spirits drive each other higher". Entertainment Weekly's Ken Tucker wrote that "Stankonia reeks of artful ambition rendered with impeccable skill" and described OutKast as "endlessly good-humored and imaginative even when dealing with the most grim and mind-deadening facets of ghetto life." Yahoo! Music's Soren Baker commented that "Dre and Big Boi again reinvent themselves, this time as Parliament-inspired musicians who specialize on male-female relationships, boasting, and out-there lyrics." Baker concluded in his review, "With another nearly flawless album, OutKast arguably solidifies their reputation as one of the best hip-hop groups of all time." The Los Angeles Times opined that "the record's most interesting moments are gorgeous Prince-style soul." Jon Pareles of The New York Times wrote that "OutKast's music savors the viscous propulsion of funk, with raps and tunes that never ignore the body and its instinctive desires ... Yet OutKast – taking cues from a band it obviously reveres, Parliament-Funkadelic – never forgets that bodies are attached to minds." URB called the album "a complex tome that enmeshes contemporary hip-hop values with a timeless Southern soul, while pushing the envelope damn near off the table." Mojo called it "hip hop with the power to convert even the most reactionary nonbelievers."

== Legacy and influence ==
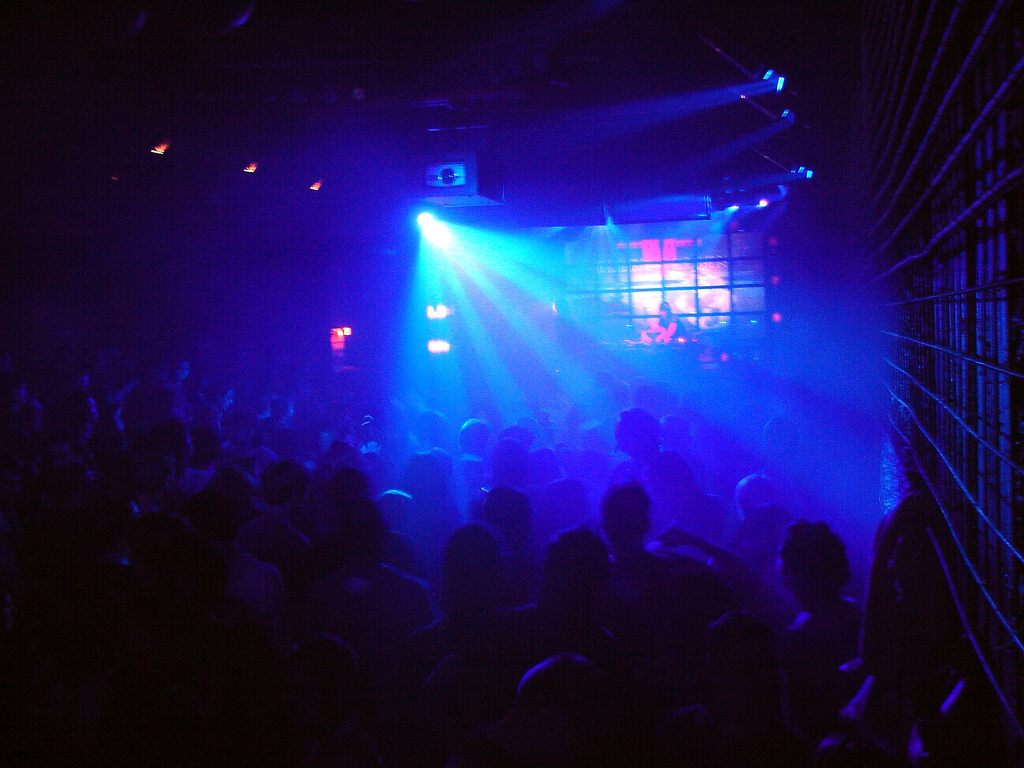
With the release of Stankonia, OutKast became the first hip hop group to openly acknowledge rave culture as an influence.

Stankonia has received many accolades and appeared on many magazines' "best of" lists; in his book Dirty South, author Ben Westhoff noted that the album appeared on "every critical best-list worth mentioning." At the 2002 Grammy Awards, OutKast won Best Rap Album for Stankonia and Best Rap Performance by a Duo or Group for "Ms. Jackson". Despite OutKast's being expected favorites, The Recording Academy instead chose the 2000 soundtrack album O Brother, Where Art Thou? for Album of the Year. Before the group's nominations, much of the hip hop community felt that rappers were not being awarded enough attention from The Recording Academy. However, the album's musical diversity allowed the band to reach a wider audience and was credited for opening the academy up to more hip hop musicians.

In 2006, Time named Stankonia as one of the 100 best albums of all time. Rolling Stone ranked the album number 16 on the magazine's list of the 100 Best Albums of the 2000s. In 2009, Pitchfork ranked Stankonia number 13 on its list of the top 200 albums of the 2000s, and Rhapsody ranked it at number 2 on its "100 Best Albums of the Decade" list. Rhapsody also ranked the album number 6 on its "Hip-Hop's Best Albums of the Decade" list. Vibe ranked the record at number 23 on its list of the "100 Greatest Albums from 1985 to 2005". Entertainment Weekly put it on its end-of-the-decade "best-of" list, saying, "With hummable hits ('Ms. Jackson') and out-there experiments ('B.O.B.'), the rap duo gave us all a visa to the funky if fictional land of Stankonia in 2000." Q listed Stankonia as one of the best 50 albums of 2001. The album was also included in the book 1001 Albums You Must Hear Before You Die. In 2024, Paste Magazine ranked Stankonia number 6 on its list of the greatest albums of all time. In 2015, Mic stated that "Stankonia helped hip-hop build its foundation in the mainstream," adding that in addition to the "irresistibly quotable" hit singles, "the deep cuts are still some of the most rewarding experimental hip-hop around."

With Stankonia, OutKast became the first hip hop act to openly acknowledge rave culture as an influence. During the late 1990s, rappers tended to embrace slow, laid-back beats in their productions. On several tracks on Stankonia, the group employed faster, more chaotic tempos to reflect rave culture and the introduction of new drugs such as ecstasy into the hip hop scene. Boston-based DJ Armand Van Helden recalls, "In the nineties, the bpms in hip-hop got slower and the clubs were moody ... it just kind of dragged. I really missed that kind of hands-in-the-air shit." A remix of "B.O.B" created by Rage Against the Machine's Zack de la Rocha received airplay on alternative radio stations, expanding the group's fanbase beyond hip hop and urban listeners. Despite containing anti-war sentiments, "B.O.B" became popular amongst American troops deployed in Afghanistan. While working on her acclaimed album The ArchAndroid (2010), American R&B singer Janelle Monáe cited Stankonia's experimental nature as an influence. Rapper Pill also acknowledged Stankonia, and particularly the production of Organized Noize, as an inspiration: "The sounds, the instrumentation of the samples, the different horns—everything about the tracks were great to me."

== Track listing ==
All tracks are produced by Earthtone III (Outkast and Mr. DJ), except where noted.

No.	Title	Writer(s)	Producer(s)	Length
1.	"Intro"	Andre Benjamin; Antwan Patton; David Sheats		1:09
2.	"Gasoline Dreams" (featuring Khujo)	Benjamin; Patton; Sheats; Willie Knighton		3:34
3.	"I'm Cool" (interlude)			0:42
4.	"So Fresh, So Clean"	Organized Noize; Benjamin; Patton	Organized Noize	4:00
5.	"Ms. Jackson"	Benjamin; Patton; Sheats		4:30
6.	"Snappin' & Trappin'" (featuring Killer Mike and J-Sweet)	Benjamin; Patton; Sheats; Michael Render; John E.E. Smith; Cory Andrews		4:19
7.	"D.F." (interlude)			0:27
8.	"Spaghetti Junction"	Organized Noize; Benjamin; Patton	Organized Noize	3:57
9.	"Kim & Cookie" (interlude)			1:12
10.	"I'll Call Before I Come" (featuring Gangsta Boo and Eco)	Benjamin; Patton; Sheats; Lola Mitchell; Rashida Roberts		4:18
11.	"B.O.B"	Benjamin; Patton; Sheats		5:04
12.	"Xplosion" (featuring B-Real)	Benjamin; Patton; Sheats; Louis Freese; Erin Johnson		4:08
13.	"Good Hair" (interlude)			0:14
14.	"We Luv Deez Hoez" (featuring Backbone and Big Gipp)	Organized Noize; Benjamin; Patton; Jamahr Williams; Cameron Gipp; Bolivar Troncoso	Organized Noize	4:10
15.	"Humble Mumble" (featuring Erykah Badu)	Benjamin; Patton; Sheats; Erica Wright		4:50
16.	"Drinkin' Again" (interlude)			0:24
17.	"?"	Benjamin; Patton; Sheats		1:28
18.	"Red Velvet"	Benjamin; Patton; Sheats		3:52
19.	"Cruisin' in the ATL" (interlude)			0:19
20.	"Gangsta Shit" (featuring Slimm Calhoun, C-Bone and T-Mo)	Carlton Mahone; Benjamin; Patton; Sheats; Robert Barnett; Brian Loving; Andrews	Carl Mo; Earthtone III^{[a]}	4:41
21.	"Toilet Tisha"	Benjamin; Patton; Sheats		4:24
22.	"Slum Beautiful" (featuring Cee-Lo)	Benjamin; Patton; Sheats; Thomas Burton		4:07
23.	"Pre-Nump" (interlude)			0:27
24.	"Stankonia (Stanklove)" (featuring Big Rube and Sleepy Brown)	Benjamin; Patton; Sheats; Patrick Brown; Ruben Bailey		6:51
Total length:				73:07

Notes

- ^{^[a]} signifies a co-producer.
- "So Fresh, So Clean" contains a sample of "Before the Night is Over" by Joe Simon.
- "Ms. Jackson" contains a sample of "Strawberry Letter #23" by The Brothers Johnson.
- "We Luv Deez Hoez" contains a sample of "Worldwide" by Allen Toussaint.

2020 deluxe edition
No.	Title	Writer(s)	Length
25.	"Ms. Jackson" (Mr. Drunk remix)		4:45
26.	"So Fresh, So Clean" (Stankonia remix) (featuring Snoop Dogg and Sleepy Brown)	Benjamin; Patton; Sheats; Brown; Calvin Broadus	4:37
27.	"B.O.B. (Bombs Over Baghdad)" (Zack de la Rocha remix)		4:36
28.	"Ms. Jackson" (a cappella)		3:54
29.	"So Fresh, So Clean" (a cappella)		3:53
30.	"B.O.B. (Bombs Over Baghdad)" (a cappella)		2:58
Total length:			97:50

2025 deluxe edition
No.	Title	Writer(s)	Length
25.	"Speed Ballin'"	Benjamin; Patton; Sheats	5:04
26.	"Sole Sunday" (Dirty Mix) (featuring Goodie Mob)	Benjamin; Patton; Sheats; Gipp; Knighton	4:39
27.	"So Fresh, So Clean" (Stankonia remix) (featuring Snoop Dogg and Sleepy Brown)		4:37
28.	"B.O.B. (Bombs Over Baghdad)" (Zack de la Rocha remix)		4:36
29.	"B.O.B. (Bombs Over Baghdad)" (Cutmaster Swiff remix)		6:08
30.	"B.O.B. (Bombs Over Baghdad)" (Beat Bullies remix)		4:21
31.	"So Fresh, So Clean" (instrumental)		4:39
32.	"B.O.B. (Bombs Over Baghdad)" (instrumental)		5:07
Total length:			112:18

== Personnel ==
OutKast

- Big Boi (Antwan Patton) – vocals, production
- André 3000 (Andre Benjamin) – vocals, synthesizers, guitar, production
- Mr. DJ (David Sheats) – production

Guest performers

- Sleepy Brown
- Khujo Goodie
- Killer Mike
- J-Sweet
- Gangsta Boo
- Eco
- B-Real
- Erykah Badu
- Backbone
- Big Gipp
- Slimm Calhoun
- C-Bone
- T-Mo Goodie
- Cee-Lo Green
- Big Rube
- Joi

Musicians

- Donnie Mathis – guitar
- David "Whild" Brown – guitar
- Jason Freeman – horns
- Jerry Freeman – horns
- Sleepy Brown – piano, synthesised bass
- Marvin "Chanz" Parkman – piano, keyboards
- Earthtone III – keyboards
- Organized Noize – keyboards
- Preston Crump – bass guitar, synthesized bass
- Aaron Mills – bass guitar
- Robert Grister – bass guitar
- Dookie Blossumgame – bass guitar
- Victor Alexander – drums
- Rosalin Heard – backing vocals
- Paul Douglas-Feddon – backing vocals
- Myrna "Screechy Peach" Crenshaw – backing vocals
- Cutmaster Swiff – cuts

Design

- Michael Lavine – photography

== Charts ==
=== Weekly charts ===
Chart (2000–2001)	Peak position
Australian Albums (ARIA)	33
Australian Urban Albums (ARIA)	5
Austrian Albums (Ö3 Austria)	16
Belgian Albums (Ultratop Flanders)	25
Canadian Albums (Billboard)	4
Canadian R&B Albums (Nielsen SoundScan)	1
Danish Albums (Hitlisten)	17
Dutch Albums (Album Top 100)	20
Finnish Albums (Suomen virallinen lista)	8
French Albums (SNEP)	26
German Albums (Offizielle Top 100)	6
Irish Albums (IRMA)	29
New Zealand Albums (RMNZ)	17
Norwegian Albums (VG-lista)	8
Scottish Albums (Official Charts)	14
Swedish Albums (Sverigetopplistan)	15
Swiss Albums (Schweizer Hitparade)	14
UK Albums (Official Charts)	10
UK R&B Albums (Official Charts)	1
US Billboard 200	2
US Top R&B/Hip-Hop Albums (Billboard)	2

Chart (2026)	Peak position
Polish Albums (ZPAV)	40

=== Year-end charts ===
Chart (2000)	Position
Canadian Albums (Nielsen SoundScan)	101
US Billboard 200	104
US Top R&B/Hip-Hop Albums (Billboard)	51

Chart (2001)	Position
Canadian Albums (Nielsen SoundScan)	80
Canadian R&B Albums (Nielsen SoundScan)	19
Canadian Rap Albums (Nielsen SoundScan)	9
European Albums (Music & Media)	100
German Albums (Offizielle Top 100)	80
New Zealand Albums (RMNZ)	44
UK Albums (OCC)	100
US Billboard 200	16
US Top R&B/Hip-Hop Albums (Billboard)	6

Chart (2002)	Position
Canadian R&B Albums (Nielsen SoundScan)	185
Canadian Rap Albums (Nielsen SoundScan)	91

=== Decade-end charts ===
Chart (2000–2009)	Position
US Billboard 200	75

== Certifications ==
Region	Certification	Certified units/sales
Australia (ARIA)	Gold	35,000^{‡}
Canada (Music Canada)	3× Platinum	300,000^{‡}
Germany (BVMI)	Gold	150,000^{‡}
New Zealand (RMNZ)	Gold	7,500^{^}
Norway (IFPI Norway)	Gold	25,000^{*}
United Kingdom (BPI)	Platinum	300,000^{‡}
United States (RIAA)	5× Platinum	5,000,000^{‡}
^{*} Sales figures based on certification alone.^{^} Shipments figures based on certification alone.^{‡} Sales+streaming figures based on certification alone.

== See also ==
- Progressive rap
