= Vicious Lies and Dangerous Rumors =

Studio album by Big Boi
- Released: December 11, 2012
- Recorded: 2011–12
- Studios: Stankonia Recording, Atlanta
- Genre: Hip-hop
- Length: 54:33
- Labels: Purple Ribbon; Def Jam
- Producers: Big Boi (also exec.); Chris Carmouche (also exec.); Andramadon; Arthur McArthur; Bosko Kante; BlackOwned C-Bone; Cy Fyre; DJ Aries; Gary Fly; Jai Paul; Jerod Ward; John Hill; Mr. DJ; Nathan Williams; Organized Noize; Phantogram; Sharif Wilson; Showdown; The Flush; Tre Luce

Big Boi chronology
Sir Lucious Left Foot: The Son of Chico Dusty (2010)	Vicious Lies and Dangerous Rumors (2012)	Big Grams (2015)

Singles from Vicious Lies and Dangerous Rumors
- 1. "Mama Told Me" Released: October 1, 2012

Vicious Lies and Dangerous Rumors is the second studio album by American rapper Big Boi, released on December 11, 2012, by Purple Ribbon Records and Def Jam Recordings. The album features guest appearances from Sleepy Brown, Phantogram, T.I., Ludacris, Kid Cudi, Little Dragon, Killer Mike, Kelly Rowland, ASAP Rocky, B.o.B, Wavves, Mouche, Scar, Bosko, Jai Paul, UGK, Big K.R.I.T., Theophilus London, and Tre Luce.

== Background ==
In a July 2010 interview for The Village Voice, Big Boi revealed that he was working on the follow-up album to the critically and commercially successful Sir Lucious Left Foot: The Son of Chico Dusty, stating that he was "maybe about six songs into it". On May 24, 2012, Big Boi announced that he was about 80% complete with his next solo release. He also revealed that both he and André 3000 would be releasing solo projects prior to any Outkast project. On May 27, 2012, Big Boi announced that the album would be entitled Vicious Lies and Dangerous Rumors On June 9, 2012, Big Boi announced via Twitter that the album would be released on November 13, 2012. However, on November 1, 2012, after revealing the cover art, the album was pushed back to December 11, 2012.

On October 1, 2012, the first single "Mama Told Me" featuring Kelly Rowland was released. The album features guest appearances from Sleepy Brown, Phantogram, T.I., Ludacris, Kid Cudi, Little Dragon, Killer Mike, Kelly Rowland, ASAP Rocky, B.o.B, Wavves, Mouche, Scar, Bosko, Jai Paul, UGK, Big K.R.I.T., Theophilus London, and Tre Luce. On November 9, 2012, Big Boi debuted "Lines" featuring ASAP Rocky and Phantogram on his SoundCloud account to a very good reception. The track had received over 100,000 listens on SoundCloud in just over a day upon release. The album is noticeably lacking from any Andre 3000 features with Big Boi saying he had sent Dre over 5 songs he could've gotten on but "contractual obligations" kept him from doing them.

== Music and lyrics ==
Vicious Lies and Dangerous Rumors has a maximalist production style and music that incorporates aggressive Southern hip-hop, Detroit basslines, indie sounds, and funk. Its songs are characterized by strong hooks. Ted Scheinman of Slant Magazine finds it to be exemplary of a recent "collusion between rap and indie acts", and calls the album "profoundly atmospheric, not in the triumphalist Kanye [West] vein, but with enough melodic hooks on which to hang songs that are both thumping and bittersweet." Pitchfork Media's Miles Raymer attributes the album's stylistic influences to Big Boi's past few years performing at festivals with indie rock and electronic acts, writing that it may be viewed as "an outgrowth of rap's artsy ambitions" or "a compilation of indietronic-rap fusion tied together by one voice".

Big Boi's lyrics explore carnal and emotional subject matter such as relationships. He raps with a confident, morally transparent persona and a polyvocal delivery that uses devices such as enjambment and deconstructionism. Kyle Anderson of Entertainment Weekly characterizes Big Boi's lyrics on the album as "purple psychedelic prose".

== Critical reception ==
Professional ratings
Aggregate scores
Source	Rating
AnyDecentMusic?	6.3/10
Metacritic	72/100
Review scores
Source	Rating
AllMusic	2.5/5 stars
The A.V. Club	B+
Entertainment Weekly	A−
Fact	4/5 stars
The Guardian	3/5 stars
NME	6/10
Pitchfork	6.1/10
Rolling Stone	4/5 stars
Slant Magazine	4/5 stars
Spin	7/10

Vicious Lies and Dangerous Rumors received generally positive reviews from music critics. At Metacritic, which assigns a normalized rating out of 100 to reviews from mainstream critics, the album received an average score of 72, based on 32 reviews. Simon Vozick-Levinson of Rolling Stone commended Big Boi for bringing his disparate collaborators "together in harmony" and found "even more" impressive "the ease with which Big Boi insinuates his smack-talking, game-kicking self into their midst". Will Butler of The A.V. Club asserted that the album "delivers" as a "feel-good record", with Big Boi "at his most selfless, honest, and exploratory now". Jon Pareles of The New York Times felt that, "even in Outkast, Big Boi was never merely a macho cartoon; now, he's revealing he's a grown-up." Slant Magazine's Ted Scheinman commented that the album's "reflexive eclecticism ... coheres on the strength" of Big Boi's rapping and felt that, "in the best sense, it's the conspicuous work of a magnanimous music lover". Dan Cairns of The Sunday Times called it a "multi-genre riot" and commented that it "demolishes the perception" of Big Boi as the uneccentric foil to André 3000. John Calvert of Fact called it "glossy, overwhelmingly kinetic and neon-colourful ... arguably the pop hip-hop production job of the year," and wrote that each of its "innumerable hooks" are "textured, accentuated and arranged in just such a way that they jump out at the listener like musical holograms."

In a mixed review, AllMusic's Andy Kellman was ambivalent towards Big Boi's collaborations and "inharmonious experiments", writing that he "adapts to the unfamiliar surroundings with little effort and often sounds comfortable, but the fusions are short on power." Rebecca Nicholson of The Guardian called it "a good album in need of a brutal trim" and felt that "its over-reliance on guests blunts the clear ambition". David Amidon of PopMatters found it to be an "awkward" listen similar to Common's 2002 album Electric Circus, but emphasized "how fun most of this music is even as it feels weird to hear Big Boi hopping on top of [it]." Miles Raymer of Pitchfork critiqued that the album is "on the one hand a genre-busting statement of artistic restlessness" but also "a mess", and found Big Boi's "dextrous, technically capable" rapping to be its "saving grace". MSN Music's Robert Christgau gave the album a one-star honorable mention, indicating "a worthy effort consumers attuned to its overriding aesthetic or individual vision may well like." He cited "Apple of My Eye" and "She Hates Me" as highlights and quipped that Big Boi "claims hip-hop, represents r&b, ends up neither here nor there".

== Commercial performance ==
The album debuted at number 34 on the Billboard 200 chart, with first-week sales of 30,000 copies in the United States. As of January 30, 2013, the album had sold 61,000 copies, according to Nielsen SoundScan.

== Track listing ==
No.	Title	Writer(s)	Producer(s)	Length
1.	"Ascending"	Andy Slagle	Big Boi; Chris Carmouche	1:09
2.	"The Thickets" (featuring Sleepy Brown)	Patrick Brown; Chris Carmouche; Donald Degrate; Antwan Patton; Cyshae Strachan	Big Boi; Chris Carmouche	2:48
3.	"Apple of My Eye"	Patton; David Sheats; Jake Troth	Mr. DJ	3:44
4.	"Objectum Sexuality" (featuring Phantogram)	Sarah Barthel; Josh Carter; Patton	Phantogram	4:49
5.	"In the A" (featuring T.I. and Ludacris)	Corey Andrews; Christopher Bridges; Lawrence Butler; Wilbert Ellis; Clifford Harris; Patton	Showdown; DJ Aries; BlackOwned C-Bone	5:20
6.	"She Hates Me" (featuring Kid Cudi)	Carmouche; Scott Mescudi; Patton; Treie; Sharif Wilson	Sharif Wilson; Chris Carmouche; Big Boi	3:50
7.	"CPU" (featuring Phantogram)	Barthel; Carmouche; Carter; Shelton Oliver; Patton; Demond Toney; Jeron Ward	Chris Carmouche; Jeron Ward	4:12
8.	"Thom Pettie" (featuring Little Dragon and Killer Mike)	Erik Bodin; David Brown; Carmouche; LaMarquis Jefferson; Yukimi Nagano; Patton; Michael Render; Fredrik Wallin; Håkan Wirenstrand	Chris Carmouche; Big Boi	3:25
9.	"Mama Told Me" (featuring Kelly Rowland)	Bodin; Carmouche; Ricardo Lewis; Nagano; Oliver; Patton; Ricky Walker; Wallin; Ward; Wirenstrand	The Flush; Chris Carmouche; Big Boi	3:10
10.	"Lines" (featuring ASAP Rocky and Phantogram)	Barthel; Carmouche; Carter; Rakim Mayers; Ray Murray; Patton; Rico Wade	Organized Noize; Chris Carmouche; Big Boi	3:24
11.	"Shoes for Running" (featuring B.o.B and Wavves)	John Hill; Bobby Ray Simmons Jr.; Patton; Nathan Williams; Sirah	John Hill; Nathan Williams	3:50
12.	"Raspberries" (featuring Mouche and Scar)	Carmouche; Jeremy McArthur; Patton; Terrence Smith	Arthur McArthur	3:41
13.	"Tremendous Damage" (featuring Bosko)	Carmouche; Timothy Clayton; Jefferson; Bosko Kante; Kevin Kendrick; Patton; Smith	Chris Carmouche; Bosko	5:21
14.	"Descending" (featuring Little Dragon)	Bodin; Carmouche; Gary Fly; Nagano; Patton; Slagle; Wallin; Wirenstrand	Andramadon; Gary Fly; Chris Carmouche	5:50
Total length:				54:33

Deluxe edition
No.	Title	Writer(s)	Producer(s)	Length
15.	"Higher Res" (featuring Jai Paul and Little Dragon)	Patton; Carmouche; Jai Paul; Anup Paul; Nagano; Bodin; Wallin; Wirenstrand	Jai Paul	2:23
16.	"Gossip" (featuring UGK and Big K.R.I.T.)	Patton; Murray; Wade; Chad Butler; Bernard Freeman; Justin Scott; Maurice Sinclair; Carmouche	Organized Noize; Chris Carmouche; Big Boi	4:09
17.	"She Said OK" (featuring Theophilus London and Tre Luce)	Patton; Carmouche; Theophilus London; Eric Lucear; Jefferson; Kendrick	Chris Carmouche; Tre Luce	3:57
Total length:				65:02

== Personnel ==
Credits for Vicious Lies and Dangerous Rumors adapted from Allmusic.

- Chris Atlas – marketing
- Big Boi – executive producer, primary artist
- Chris Carmouche – executive producer
- Steven Defino – package design
- Brian "Big Bass" Gardner – mastering
- Bernie Grundman – mastering
- Justin "Jus10" Huff – cover illustration, illustrations
- Tai Linzie – artwork, photo production
- Robert "The Barber" Poller – illustrations
- Sha Money XL – A&R
- Autumn Robinson – A&R administration
- Meredith Truax – photo production
- Cara Walker – package production
- Eric Weissman – sample clearance
- Andrew Zaeh – photography

== Charts ==
=== Weekly charts ===
Chart (2012)	Peak position
US Billboard 200	34
US Top R&B/Hip-Hop Albums (Billboard)	6

=== Year-end charts ===
Chart (2013)	Position
US Top R&B/Hip-Hop Albums (Billboard)	69
