= Even in Darkness =

Studio album by Dungeon Family
- Released: November 20, 2001
- Genre: Hip hop
- Length: 58:32
- Label: Arista
- Producer: Organized Noize; Earthtone III

Singles from Even in Darkness
- 1. "Trans DF Express" Released: October 9, 2001; 2. "6 Minutes (Dungeon Family It's On)" Released: 2002

Professional ratings
Review scores
Source	Rating
AllMusic	3.5/5 stars
HipHopDX	4/5
RapReviews	9/10
Robert Christgau	B+

Even in Darkness is the only studio album by American hip hop supergroup the Dungeon Family. It was released on November 20, 2001 via Arista Records. Production was handled by Organized Noize and Earthtone III.

== Track listing ==
1. "Presenting Dungeon Family"
  - Backbone
  - Killer Mike
2. "Crooked Booty"
  - Cee-Lo
  - Andre 3000
  - Sleepy Brown
  - Khujo Goodie
3. "Follow the Light"
  - Sleepy Brown
  - Cee-Lo
  - Big Gipp
  - Big Boi
  - Shuga Luv
4. "Trans DF Express"
  - Cee-Lo
  - Outkast (André 3000 and Big Boi)
  - Big Gipp
  - Backbone
5. "On & On & On"
  - Big Boi
  - Witchdoctor
  - Goodie Mob (Big Gipp, T-Mo, and Khujo Goodie)
6. "Emergency"
  - Big Gipp
  - Mello
  - Backbone
7. "Forever Pimpin' (Never Slippin')"
  - Cool Breeze
8. "6 Minutes (Dungeon Family It's On)"
  - Big Boi
  - Witchdoctor
  - Goodie Mob (Big Gipp, Cee-Lo, T-Mo, and Khujo Goodie)
  - Backbone
  - Cool Breeze
  - Big Rube
9. "White Gutz"
  - Sleepy Brown
  - Big Boi
  - Bubba Sparxxx
  - Goodie Mob (Big Gipp, Cee-Lo, and Khujo Goodie)
10. "Rollin'"
  - Andre 3000
  - Cee-Lo
  - Society of Soul (Sleepy Brown, Big Rube, and Roni)
11. "They Comin'..."
  - Lumberjacks (T-Mo and Khujo Goodie)
12. "Excalibur"
  - Goodie Mob (Big Gipp, Khujo Goodie, and Cee-Lo)
  - Big Rube
13. "What Iz Rap?"
  - Witchdoctor
  - Big Rube
14. "Curtains (DF 2nd Generation)"
  - ChamDon (G-Rock and C-Smooth)
  - Blvd. International
  - Slimm Calhoun
  - Killer Mike
  - Koncrete (C-Bone, Supa Nate, and Lil' Brotha)
  - Lil' Wil

== Personnel ==
- Aaron Mills – bass (tracks: 2, 4, 9, 10)
- André Lauren Benjamin – lead vocals (tracks: 2, 4, 10), backing vocals (track 2)
- Antwan André Patton – lead vocals (tracks: 3–6, 8, 9), additional vocals (track 5), backing vocals (track 8)
- Brandon "Shuga Luv" Bennett – lead vocals (track 3)
- Bob Lewis – trombone (track 12)
- Brian "Slimm Calhoun" Loving – lead vocals (track 14)
- Calvin Loatman – guitar (track 7)
- Cameron Gipp – lead vocals (tracks: 3–5, 8, 9, 12)
- Corey "C-Bone" Andrews – lead vocals (track 14)
- David Whild – guitar (tracks: 3, 10)
- Debra Killings – backing vocals (track 8)
- Donny Mathis – guitar (track 2, 11, 12)
- Eric Alexander – trombone (track 12)
- Erin "Witchdoctor" Johnson – lead vocals (tracks: 5, 8, 13)
- Frederick "Cool Breeze" Bell – lead vocals (tracks: 7, 8)
- Greg "G-Rocka" Martin – backing vocals (track 6)
- Jamahr "Backbone" Williams – lead vocals (tracks: 1, 4, 6, 8)
- James "Mello Capone" Hollins – lead vocals (track 6)
- Jason Freeman – horns (track 2)
- Jerry Freeman – horns (track 2)
- Joi Elaine Gilliam-Gipp – additional vocals (track 4)
- Jonathan Mannion – photography
- Kawan "KP" Prather – A&R
- Kebbi Williams – horns (track 2)
- Kirsten Shelton – backing vocals (track 7)
- Lee King – trumpet (track 12)
- Marvin "Chanz" Parkman – keyboards (tracks: 1, 2, 5, 6, 11), bass (track 7), organ (track 12)
- Michael "Blue" Williams – co-executive producer, management
- Michael Santiago Render – lead vocals (track 14), additional vocals (track 1)
- Mike Barry – trumpet (track 12)
- Mike Cebulski – timpani & gong (track 12)
- Mike Hartnett – bass (tracks: 8, 13), guitar (track 13)
- Nathaniel Elder – lead vocals (track 14)
- Nivea B. Hamilton – additional vocals (track 5)
- Patrick "Sleepy" Brown – lead vocals (tracks: 2, 3, 10), additional vocals & strings (track 4), backing vocals & keyboards (track 8)
- Richard Owens – horns (track 2)
- Robert "T-Mo" Barnett – lead vocals (tracks: 5, 8, 11)
- Ruben Lemont Bailey – lead vocals (tracks: 8, 10, 12, 13)
- Thomas DeCarlo Callaway Burton – lead vocals (tracks: 2, 3, 8, 10, 12), additional vocals (tracks: 4, 12)
- Warren Anderson Mathis – lead vocals (track 9)
- Willie Edward Knighton – lead vocals (tracks: 2, 5, 8, 11, 12), additional vocals (track 11)
- Blvd. International – backing vocals (track 6), lead vocals (track 14)
- Brother James – lead vocals (track 14)
- Chamdon – lead vocals (track 14)
- Cutmaster Swiff – scratches (tracks: 5, 14)
- DJ Herb – scratches (track 6)
- Earthtone III – producers (tracks: 1, 2, 5, 11)
- Lil' Wil – additional vocals (track 14)
- Organized Noize – producers (tracks: 3, 4, 6–10, 12–14)
- Preecha – additional vocals (track 13)
- Preston Crump – bass (tracks: 12, 14)
- Ramon – additional vocals (track 13)
- Ramon Campbell – A&R
- Ricciano – backing vocals (tracks: 6, 7, 9)
- Society Of Soul – vocals (track 10)
- Sweet Melodi – backing vocals (track 9)

== Charts ==
=== Weekly charts ===
Chart (2001)	Peak position
US Billboard 200	42
US Top R&B/Hip-Hop Albums (Billboard)	4

=== Year-end charts ===
Chart (2002)	Position
US Top R&B/Hip-Hop Albums (Billboard)	78
