= Margarita (Sleepy Brown song) =

Single by Sleepy Brown featuring Pharrell and Big Boi

from the album Mr. Brown
- Released: June 20, 2006
- Recorded: 2005
- Length: 3:55
- Label: Virgin
- Songwriters: Patrick Brown; Pharrell Williams; Charles Hugo; Antwan Patton
- Producer: The Neptunes

Sleepy Brown singles chronology
"The Otherside" (2005)	"Margarita" (2006)	"Morris Brown" (2006)

Pharrell singles chronology
"Mr. Me Too" (2006)	"Margarita" (2006)	"Money Maker" (2006)

Big Boi singles chronology
"U Got Me!!!" (2005)	"Margarita" (2006)	"Hood Boy" (2006)

"Margarita" is a song by American singer Sleepy Brown featuring Pharrell Williams and Big Boi. It was produced by Williams and Chad Hugo as The Neptunes. Taken from Brown's third studio album Mr. Brown, the song debuted at number 8 on the Bubbling Under Hot 100 Singles chart, which fell off soon after.

== Music video ==
A music video was filmed in Spain in June 2006 and was released in July that year. The video peaked at number 2 on BET's 106 & Park.

== Chart positions ==
Chart (2006)	Peak position
U.S. Billboard Bubbling Under Hot 100 Singles	8
