= Mr. Brown (album) =

Studio album by Sleepy Brown
- Released: October 3, 2006
- Recorded: 2004–06
- Studio: Various: Dungeon East Recording Studio (Atlanta, GA); Stankonia Recording Studio (Atlanta, GA); The Record Plant (Los Angeles, CA); House of Blues Studio (Encino, CA); Paper V.U. Studios (North Hollywood, CA); The Studio (Philadelphia, PA); Dirty South Studios (Atlanta, GA); Presidential Records Studio (Houston, TX); Glenwood Place Studios (Burbank, CA); Le Crib Studios (Westport, CT)
- Genre: Hip-hop; R&B
- Length: 53:34
- Label: Purple Ribbon; Virgin; EMI
- Producer: Big Boi (exec.); Organized Noize (also exec.); Carl Mo; Presidential Productions; Printz Board; The Neptunes

Sleepy Brown chronology
Sleepy's Theme: The Vinyl Room (1998)	Mr. Brown (2006)	Sex, Drugs, & Soul (2011)

Singles from Mr. Brown
- 1. "I Can't Wait" Released: February 17, 2004; 2. "Margarita" Released: June 20, 2006

Professional ratings
Aggregate scores
Source	Rating
Metacritic	59/100
Review scores
Source	Rating
AllMusic	3/5 stars
HipHopDX	2.5/5 stars
Rolling Stone	3/5 stars
Spin	3/5 stars
USA Today	2.5/4 stars

Mr. Brown is the debut solo studio album by American singer and producer Sleepy Brown. It was released on October 3, 2006, via Purple Ribbon Records/Virgin Records. Recording sessions took place at the Dungeon Recording Studios, at Stankonia Recording Studios and at Dirty South Studios in Atlanta, at the Record Plant and at Paper V.U. Studios in Los Angeles, at House of Blues Studio, Encino, at The Studio in Philadelphia, at Presidential Records Studio in Houston, at Glenwood Place Studios in Burbank, and at Le Crib Studios in Westport. Production was handled by Organized Noize, The Neptunes, Carl Mo, Printz Board and Presidential Productions. The album features guest appearances from Outkast, Pharrell Williams and Joi.

Its lead single, "Margarita", peaked at #64 on the Hot R&B/Hip-Hop Songs chart. The song "I Can't Wait" was previously released as a single from the BarberShop 2: Back in Business Soundtrack.

== Track listing ==
No.	Title	Writer(s)	Producer(s)	Length
1.	"I'm Soul"	Rico Wade; Patrick Brown; Ray Murray; Michael D. Hartnett; Kenny Gamble; Leon Huff	Organized Noize	5:41
2.	"Margarita" (featuring Pharrell & Big Boi)	Brown; Pharrell Williams; Chad Hugo; Antwan Patton	The Neptunes	4:47
3.	"Get 2 It"	Wade; Brown; Murray	Organized Noize	4:01
4.	"Dress Up"	Wade; Brown; Murray	Organized Noize	3:53
5.	"One of dem Nights"	Brown; Priese Board; Keith Harris	Printz Board; Sleepy Brown	4:09
6.	"Me, My Baby, & My Cadillac" (Prelude)			0:50
7.	"Me, My Baby, & My Cadillac"	Brown; Berry Gordy; Alphonso Mizell; Freddie Perren; Deke Richards	Sleepy Brown	3:52
8.	"Come Dance with Me"	Carlton Mahone; Tony Hightower; Brown; Jason Freeman	Carl Mo	3:15
9.	"Underwater Love"	Montez Harris; Brandon Peters; Brown; Brandon Bennett	Presidential Productions	4:01
10.	"Till (Your Legs Start Shaking)"	Wade; Brown; Murray; Bennett; Samuel Christian	Organized Noize	4:10
11.	"Sunday Morning"	Wade; Brown; Murray	Organized Noize	3:57
12.	"Oh Ho Hum" (featuring Joi)	Wade; Brown; Murray	Organized Noize	5:23
13.	"I Can't Wait" (featuring Outkast)	Wade; Brown; Murray; Bennett; André Benjamin; Patton; Christian; Eddie Holland; Lamont Dozier; Brian Holland	Organized Noize	5:35
Total length:				53:34

Sample credits

- "I'm Soul" contains elements from "Come Go with Me", written by Kenny Gamble and Leon Huff, performed by Teddy Pendergrass.
- "Me, My Baby, & My Cadillac (Prelude)" and "Me, My Baby, & My Cadillac" contain interpolations from "Maybe Tomorrow", written by Berry Gordy, Alphonso Mizell, Freddie Perren, and Deke Richards.
- "I Can't Wait" contains a portion of "Don't Leave Me Starvin' for Your Love", written by Eddie Holland, Lamont Dozier, and Brian Holland.

== Chart history ==
Chart (2006)	Peak position
US Billboard 200	53
US Top R&B/Hip-Hop Albums (Billboard)	6
