= Ms. Jackson =

2000 single by Outkast

Single by Outkast

from the album Stankonia
- B-side: "Sole Sunday"; "Elevators (Me & You)"
- Released: October 24, 2000
- Studio: Stankonia Recording (Atlanta, Georgia)
- Genre: Hip hop; R&B; soul; psychedelic rap
- Length: 4:30 (album version); 4:03 (radio edit)
- Label: LaFace; Arista
- Songwriters: André Benjamin; Antwan Patton; David Sheats
- Producer: Earthtone III

Outkast singles chronology
"B.O.B" (2000)	"Ms. Jackson" (2000)	"So Fresh, So Clean" (2001)

Audio sample
- file; help

Music video
- "Ms. Jackson" on YouTube

"Ms. Jackson" is a song by the American hip-hop duo Outkast, consisting of André 3000 and Big Boi. It was released on October 24, 2000, as the second single from Outkast's fourth album, Stankonia. It topped the US Billboard Hot 100 chart for one week on February 17, 2001, and reached number one in Germany, the Netherlands, Norway, and Sweden. Rolling Stone ranked it 55th on its "100 Best Songs of the 2000s" list in June 2011 and at number 145 on its "Top 500 Greatest Songs of All Time" list in 2021. In October 2011, NME placed it at number 81 on its list of the "150 Best Tracks of the Past 15 Years".

"Ms. Jackson" won the Grammy Award for Best Rap Performance by a Duo or Group at the 44th Annual Grammy Awards. The music video, directed by F. Gary Gray, which features animals nodding along to the song, won the BET Award for Video of the Year and MTV Video Music Award for Best Hip-Hop Video. The single helped sell the album following the commercial underperformance of the lead single, "B.O.B", which, despite near universal acclaim from critics, failed to chart on the Hot 100 and only reached number 69 on the Billboard Hot R&B/Hip-Hop Singles & Tracks chart.

== Background and writing ==
In Vibe magazine, a few years after the song was released, André Benjamin (André 3000) recalled creating the song, "'Ms. Jackson' was an acoustic guitar song that I was doing at home. Then I just converted it over into something people could understand a little bit more." The song was inspired, in part, by Benjamin's relationship with Erykah Badu and her mother. In November 2016, Badu described her initial reaction to the song, stating that, "It hit kind of a sore spot. I didn't wanna hear that, especially when I heard Big Boi's verse. When I heard André's verse, I felt very good because his verse was really, really inspiring. He just said how he felt and it was his honest feelings and I always respected that and listened to what he felt and appreciated it." Badu also noted that her mother loved the song, saying, "Baby, she bought herself a 'Ms. Jackson' license plate. She had the mug, she had the ink pen, she had the headband, everything."

== Content ==
Lyrically, the song is a love profession to the mother of the narrator's romantic partner that examines the issues that arise from having a child out of wedlock. In the song, the narrator promises to support his child regardless of what happens. The instrumentation samples the Brothers Johnson's version (with various audio effects, prominently reversing) of "Strawberry Letter 23", by Shuggie Otis.

== Critical reception ==
Billboard magazine wrote that song's message is genuine, noting its 1980s hip-hop sound and Outkast's "frantic" lyrics that emphasize the track's storyline. Reviewing the parent album, the same publication compared the track to an "old-school hip-hop love song" and called it "oh-so-radio-ready". Marci Kenon of Billboard called the "babies' mommas' mommas" hook memorable and later referred to the track as "infectious".

In 2020, The Ringer ranked the song number five on its list of the 50 greatest Outkast songs, and in 2021, The Guardian ranked the song number six on its list of the 20 greatest Outkast songs.

== Music video ==
The song's music video, directed by F. Gary Gray and produced by Earthtone III, works as a possible metaphor for the duo's "stormy" relationships with the mothers of their children and their families. In the United States, a DVD single featuring the videos for "B.O.B" and "Ms. Jackson" was released in 2000, before the other physical formats. Along with Toni Braxton's "Just Be a Man About It", this single was the first to bear only a DVD credit on the Billboard Hot 100 until the other formats were issued. Because "Ms. Jackson" was the only Outkast song that was present on the Hot 100 at the time, sales points were added to this song instead of "B.O.B".

== Track listings ==
US maxi-CD and 12-inch single, Australian CD single

1. "Ms. Jackson" (radio mix) – 4:03
2. "Ms. Jackson" (instrumental) – 4:34
3. "Sole Sunday" feat. Goodie Mob (radio mix) – 4:41
4. "Sole Sunday" feat. Goodie Mob (instrumental) – 4:41

US DVD single

1. "B.O.B" (video)
2. "Ms. Jackson" (video)
3. "What Is Stankonia? An Exclusive Interview with Big Boi & Dre"

European CD single

1. "Ms. Jackson" (radio mix) – 4:03
2. "Ms. Jackson" (instrumental) – 4:34

UK CD single

1. "Ms. Jackson" (radio edit) – 3:36
2. "Elevators (Me & You)" – 4:56
3. "Ms. Jackson" (video) – 4:58

UK 12-inch and cassette single

1. "Ms. Jackson" (album version) – 4:30
2. "Elevators (Me & You)" – 4:56

== Credits and personnel ==
Credits are lifted from the UK CD single liner notes.

Studio

- Recorded and mixed at Stankonia Recording (Atlanta, Georgia)

Personnel

- André 3000 – writing (as André Benjamin), vocals, background vocals, guitar
- Big Boi – writing (as Antwan Patton), vocals
- David Sheats – writing
- Earthtone III – keyboards, programming, production, arrangement
- Rajinder Kala – backwards congas
- Marvin "Chanz" Parkman – piano
- Aaron Mills of Cameo – bass
- John Frye – recording
- Malik Albert – recording assistant
- Vincent Alexander – recording assistant
- Warren Bletcher – recording assistant, mixing assistant
- Neal H. Pogue – mixing

== Charts ==
=== Weekly charts ===
Chart (2000–2001)	Peak position
Australia (ARIA)	2
Australian Urban (ARIA)	2
Austria (Ö3 Austria Top 40)	3
Belgium (Ultratop 50 Flanders)	2
Belgium (Ultratop 50 Wallonia)	5
Canada (Nielsen SoundScan)	9
Canada CHR (Nielsen BDS)	12
Croatia (HRT)	6
Denmark (Tracklisten)	3
Europe (Eurochart Hot 100)	1
Finland (Suomen virallinen lista)	8
France (SNEP)	5
Germany (GfK)	1
Ireland (IRMA)	5
Italy (FIMI)	9
Netherlands (Dutch Top 40)	1
Netherlands (Single Top 100)	1
New Zealand (Recorded Music NZ)	5
Norway (VG-lista)	1
Poland Airplay (Music & Media)	3
Romania (Romanian Top 100)	6
Scottish Singles Sales (Official Charts)	4
Sweden (Sverigetopplistan)	1
Switzerland (Schweizer Hitparade)	2
UK Singles (Official Charts)	2
UK Dance (Official Charts)	3
UK Hip Hop/R&B (Official Charts)	1
US Billboard Hot 100	1
US Hot R&B/Hip-Hop Songs (Billboard)	1
US Hot Rap Songs (Billboard)	1
US Pop Airplay (Billboard)	13
US Rhythmic Airplay (Billboard)	1

=== Year-end charts ===
Chart (2001)	Position
Australia (ARIA)	17
Australian Urban (ARIA)	7
Austria (Ö3 Austria Top 40)	21
Belgium (Ultratop 50 Flanders)	21
Belgium (Ultratop 50 Wallonia)	28
Europe (Eurochart Hot 100)	11
France (SNEP)	45
Germany (Media Control)	12
Ireland (IRMA)	52
Netherlands (Dutch Top 40)	34
Netherlands (Single Top 100)	50
Romania (Romanian Top 100)	79
Sweden (Hitlistan)	15
Switzerland (Schweizer Hitparade)	24
UK Singles (OCC)	43
UK Urban (Music Week)	24
US Billboard Hot 100	25
US Hot R&B/Hip-Hop Singles & Tracks (Billboard)	18
US Hot Rap Singles (Billboard)	3
US Mainstream Top 40 (Billboard)	56
US Rhythmic Top 40 (Billboard)	10

== Certifications ==
Region	Certification	Certified units/sales
Australia (ARIA)	5× Platinum	350,000^{‡}
Belgium (BRMA)	Gold	25,000^{*}
Denmark (IFPI Danmark)	2× Platinum	180,000^{‡}
France (SNEP)	Gold	250,000^{*}
Germany (BVMI)	3× Gold	900,000^{‡}
Italy (FIMI)	Gold	35,000^{‡}
New Zealand (RMNZ)	7× Platinum	210,000^{‡}
Norway (IFPI Norway)	Platinum	
Spain (Promusicae)	Gold	30,000^{‡}
Sweden (GLF)	Platinum	30,000^{^}
Switzerland (IFPI Switzerland)	Gold	20,000^{^}
United Kingdom (BPI)	3× Platinum	1,800,000^{‡}
United States (RIAA)	8× Platinum	8,000,000^{‡}
^{*} Sales figures based on certification alone.^{^} Shipments figures based on certification alone.^{‡} Sales+streaming figures based on certification alone.

== Release history ==
Region	Date	Format(s)	Label(s)	Ref.
United States	October 24, 2000	Rhythmic contemporary; urban radio	Arista; LaFace	
United States	December 12, 2000	Contemporary hit radio	Arista; LaFace	
Sweden	January 22, 2001	CD	Arista; LaFace	
United Kingdom	February 19, 2001	12-inch vinyl; CD; cassette	Arista; LaFace	
Australia	February 26, 2001	CD	Arista; LaFace	
