= Purple Ribbon All-Stars =

American hip hop supergroup

- Origin: Atlanta, Georgia, U.S.
- Genres: Southern hip-hop
- Years active: 2004–2007
- Labels: Purple Ribbon; Virgin
- Spinoff of: Dungeon Family
- Past members: Big Boi; Killer Mike; Janelle Monáe; Sleepy Brown; BlackOwned C-Bone; Rock D; Konkrete; Scar; Vonnegutt; Bubba Sparxxx; Fonzworth Bentley; Scar; DonkeeBoy; Lil' Co; G-Rock

Purple Ribbon All-Stars was an American Southern hip-hop supergroup under the Purple Ribbon Records (distributed through Virgin Records) label. The group consisted of Big Boi, Killer Mike, Janelle Monáe, Sleepy Brown, Scar, Konkrete, BlackOwned C-Bone, Rock D, and Vonnegutt.

== Discography ==
Albums

- Got Purp? Vol. 2 (2005)

Mixtapes

- Got That Purp (2004)

Singles

List of singles, with selected chart positions, showing year released and album name
Title	Year	Peak chart positions			Album
Title	Year	US	US R&B	US Rap	Album
"Kryptonite (I'm on It)"	2005	35	8	4	Got Purp?, Vol. 2
"Body Rock"	2006	—	55	—	Got Purp?, Vol. 2
"—" denotes a recording that did not chart or was not released in that territory.
