= BlackOwned C-Bone =

- Born: Corey Andrews; August 1, 1974 (age 52)
- Origin: Atlanta, Georgia, U.S.
- Genre: Southern hip hop
- Years active: 1999–present
- Label: Purple Ribbon Records

Corey Andrews, a.k.a. BlackOwned C-Bone, is a member of the hip-hop crew the Dungeon Family and the trio Konkrete. He has made notable appearances on OutKast's "Gangsta Shit" in 2000 and on "Kryptonite", the lead single from 2006's Got Purp? Vol 2, Purple Ribbon Records' first major release.

== Early life/Career ==
Cory "C-Bone" is from College Park, GA, and attended Benjamin Banneker High School. He started "My Dope Stories" Apparel, which is also the name of a web series and soundtrack with fellow rapper Slimm Calhoun

== Discography ==
=== As featured artist ===
Solo

- Outkast - "Gangsta Shit" (Stankonia)
- Backbone - "O.K" (Concrete Law)
- Purple Ribbon All-Stars - "Kryptonite" (Got Purp? Vol. 2)
- Yung Joc - "Dope Boy Magic" (New Joc City)

Konkrete

- Dungeon Family - "Curtains" (of 2nd Generation) (Even in Darkness)
- Big Boi - "Tomb of the Boom" (Speakerboxxx/The Love Below)
- Purple Ribbon Records - "Beef" (Got that Purp?)
- Purple Ribbon Records - "Whatcha Wanna Do" (Got that Purp?)
- Purple Ribbon Records - "D-Boi Stance" feat. Big Boi (Got that Purp?)
- Purple Ribbon Records - "Hard in the Paint" (Got that Purp?)
- Purple Ribbon Records - "Shit Ya Drawers" (Got Purp? Vol. 2)
- Purple Ribbon Records - "Lovin' This" (Got Purp? Vol. 2)
