= Purple Ribbon Records =

- Founded: 2000
- Founder: Big Boi; Andre 3000
- Status: Active
- Distributor: Virgin (former)
- Country of origin: United States
- Location: Atlanta, Georgia

Purple Ribbon Records is a record label owned by Outkast and distributed through Virgin Records. It was formed in 2000 (26 years ago) as Aquemini Records, named after OutKast's 1998 album of the same name. It is run solely by Big Boi. It is credited with launching the career of Janelle Monáe.

== Discography ==
As Aquemini Records:

- Slimm Calhoun – The Skinny (2001)
- Killer Mike – Monster (2003)
- Various – Aquemini Records - Volume 1 (2003)

As Purple Ribbon Records:

- Big Boi – Got That Purp (2005)
- Big Boi Presents Purple Ribbon All Stars – Got Purp? Vol 2 (2005)
- Bubba Sparxx –The Charm (2006)
- Sleepy Brown – Mr. Brown (2006)
- Janelle Monáe – Metropolis: Suite I (The Chase) (2007) — joint release with Bad Boy Records
- Vonnegutt – Falling Up the Stairs (2012)
- Big Boi & Sleepy Brown - Big Sleepover (2021)

== See also ==
- List of record labels
