= Mr. DJ =

American record producer and DJ

- Born: David Sheats
- Origin: Atlanta, Georgia, U.S.
- Genres: Southern hip-hop; R&B; alternative hip-hop
- Occupations: Record producer; disc jockey; songwriter; music executive; rapper; singer
- Years active: 1994–present
- Labels: LaFace; Camp David
- Formerly of: Earthtone III

David Sheats, known professionally as Mr. DJ, is an American record producer and disc jockey (DJ) from Atlanta, Georgia. He came to prominence in the mid-1990s as the touring DJ for Outkast before becoming one-third of the production team Earthtone III alongside Big Boi and André 3000.

Working closely with the Dungeon Family, Mr. DJ co-produced much of the group’s recorded output from ATLiens (1996) through Idlewild (2006), and co-wrote several of their best-known singles, including "Ms. Jackson" and "The Whole World". He shared the Grammy Award for Best Rap Album at the 44th Grammy Awards as a producer on OutKast’s Stankonia (2000), which was also nominated for Album of the Year.

Beyond OutKast, Mr. DJ has produced or co-produced tracks for artists including Goodie Mob, Mos Def, Common, Killer Mike, Bubba Sparxxx, Nappy Roots, 8Ball & MJG, Lenny Kravitz, DJ Khaled, and others. In 2008 he founded the label and creative hub Camp David Records.

In the 2020s he has remained active as a producer, mentor and solo artist, including work with Atlanta musician Raury and the release of his single "Pop My Sh*t" featuring Big K.R.I.T. in 2025. In 2025, OutKast were inducted into the Rock and Roll Hall of Fame as part of the Hall’s performer class, a recognition that further highlighted the body of work Mr. DJ helped craft with the duo and the Dungeon Family collective.

== Biography ==
=== Early life ===
Mr. DJ was raised on the south side of College Park, a city in the Atlanta metropolitan area, and attended Banneker High School. He grew up immersed in Atlanta’s emerging hip hop scene and began DJing as a teenager.

According to Sheats, producer Rico Wade of Organized Noize is his first cousin, and their conversations about OutKast helped him see an opening to work with the group. He has recalled telling Wade that he was a DJ and should be allowed to DJ for the duo. That connection eventually led to Sheats becoming OutKast’s touring DJ in the mid-1990s.

=== Transition to production and Earthtone III ===
After spending about a year on the road as OutKast’s DJ, Sheats began focusing increasingly on production. Working around Organized Noize and the Dungeon Family studio environment, he studied beat-making and arrangement, gradually moving from the turntables to the mixing board.

His earliest production work with OutKast appeared on the group’s second album ATLiens (1996), and he contributed to the single "Elevators (Me & You)". On the follow-up album Aquemini (1998), Mr. DJ’s role expanded further; he co-produced several tracks and contributed to the group’s evolving fusion of Southern hip hop, funk, soul and psychedelic influences.

Around this period, Sheats and the two members of OutKast formalised their production partnership under the name Earthtone III. As Earthtone III, the trio would go on to handle the majority of OutKast’s production work on Stankonia (2000), Speakerboxxx/The Love Below (2003) and the film soundtrack Idlewild (2006).

Mr. DJ is credited as a co-writer on numerous OutKast songs, including "Black Ice (Sky High)" (with Goodie Mob), "Da Art of Storytellin' (Part 1)", "Ms. Jackson", "The Whole World" and "Land of a Million Drums". Many of these songs became charting singles and helped cement OutKast’s reputation as one of hip hop’s most innovative acts.

=== Work with Dungeon Family and other collaborators ===
Alongside his work with OutKast, Mr. DJ became a core member of the Dungeon Family, contributing production to projects by fellow Atlanta artists and label-mates. His credits from the late 1990s and early 2000s include tracks for Goodie Mob (Still Standing), Cool Breeze (East Point's Greatest Hit), 8Ball & MJG (In Our Lifetime), Killer Mike (Monster and Got Purp? Vol. 2), Field Mob, Nappy Roots, Da BackWudz and others.

Sheats’s production work extended beyond the Dungeon Family as well. He contributed to remixes and collaborations with artists such as Lenny Kravitz ("Again (Stankonia Remix)"), No Doubt ("Hey Baby (Stank Remix)"), and the soundtrack cut "Land of a Million Drums" for the 2002 Scooby-Doo film.

In the mid-2000s and late 2000s, he produced or co-produced tracks for Rich Boy, Bubba Sparxxx, Gangsta Boo, Mos Def (on The Ecstatic), and Common (Universal Mind Control), among others. His later credits include work on Big Boi’s solo albums Sir Lucious Left Foot: The Son of Chico Dusty and Vicious Lies and Dangerous Rumors, as well as "Benz Friends (Whatchutola)" by Future featuring André 3000 from the album Honest (2014).

=== Camp David Records ===
In 2008, Sheats launched Camp David Records, a label and creative company intended as a home for emerging artists and producers. Camp David has been described as a space for developing new talent while continuing the Dungeon Family’s emphasis on experimentation and Southern hip hop identity. Early signings and collaborators associated with the label have included artists such as Jeff B., Chinkie Brown and producer Shawty Redd.

=== Later career, mentoring, and solo releases ===
Mr. DJ has continued to work as a producer and mentor into the 2010s and 2020s. In an interview with New Wave Magazine, Atlanta artist Raury described himself as being "in residence at Mr DJ’s house" during the making of his album Strawberry Moon, noting that Sheats coached him through the production process and that the two began collaborating closely at the onset of the COVID-19 pandemic.

In 2019, Mr. DJ was credited as a writer on DJ Khaled’s single "Just Us" featuring SZA from the album Father of Asahd, which became a U.S. and UK chart entry. His songwriting and production work during this period underscored his continuing relevance in mainstream and Southern hip hop.

In October 2025, Mr. DJ released the single "Pop My Sh*t", featuring Mississippi rapper Big K.R.I.T., through Camp David in partnership with AMP Music. The track, described by the hip hop outlet VannDigital as a "powerful slice of Southern hip-hop" and a reflection of his long-running contributions to OutKast’s catalog, also marked a step toward Sheats recording more prominently as a lead artist.

According to VannDigital, "Pop My Sh*t" served as the lead single for Mr. DJ’s album Beats + Vibes & Verses, scheduled for release in October 2025, with guest appearances by fellow Dungeon Family affiliates including Killer Mike, CeeLo Green, Jazze Pha and Big Rube.

== Musical style and influence ==
Mr. DJ’s production style has often been associated with layered instrumentation, prominent bass lines, and mixtures of live instrumentation with programmed drums, reflecting both Southern funk traditions and experimental hip hop aesthetics. His work with OutKast helped define the sound of late-1990s and early-2000s Southern hip hop, particularly through albums like Aquemini and Stankonia, which combined psychedelic, soul, rock and electronic influences.

Sheats is frequently cited in discussions of Atlanta’s broader musical legacy, especially in relation to the Dungeon Family’s role in reshaping mainstream perceptions of Southern rap.

== Awards and recognition ==
- In 2002, Mr. DJ won the Grammy Award for Best Rap Album as a producer on OutKast’s Stankonia at the 44th Annual Grammy Awards. The album was also nominated for Album of the Year.
- As part of OutKast’s extended creative team and the Dungeon Family collective, his work is associated with the group’s six Grammy Awards and multiple multi-platinum albums, including Speakerboxxx/The Love Below, which won the Grammy Award for Album of the Year in 2004.
- In April 2025, OutKast were announced as inductees into the Rock and Roll Hall of Fame class of 2025 in the performer category, with coverage of the induction frequently highlighting the contributions of producers and collaborators from the Dungeon Family, including Organized Noize and Mr. DJ.

== Selected production and songwriting credits ==
=== With OutKast / Earthtone III (selection) ===
- "Elevators (Me & You)" – from ATLiens (1996) – co-production and songwriting.
- Several tracks on Aquemini (1998), including "Da Art of Storytellin' (Part 1)".
- Multiple tracks on Stankonia (2000), including "Ms. Jackson" and "B.O.B.".
- "The Whole World" – from Big Boi and Dre Present... OutKast (2001).
- Large portions of Speakerboxxx/The Love Below (2003) and the Idlewild soundtrack (2006) as part of Earthtone III.

=== Other artists (selection) ===
- Goodie Mob – selected tracks on Still Standing (1998).
- Nappy Roots – "Roll Again" on Wooden Leather (2003).
- Killer Mike – "Monster" and "A.D.I.D.A.S." on Monster (2003).
- Gangsta Boo – "Down Chick" on Enquiring Minds II: The Soap Opera (2003).
- Common – "Make My Day", "Changes" and "Everywhere" on Universal Mind Control (2008).
- Mos Def – multiple tracks on The Ecstatic (2009).
- Big Boi – "Daddy Fat Sax" on Sir Lucious Left Foot: The Son of Chico Dusty (2010) and "Apple of My Eye" on Vicious Lies and Dangerous Rumors (2012).
- Future featuring André 3000 – "Benz Friends (Whatchutola)" on Honest (2014).
- DJ Khaled featuring SZA – "Just Us" on Father of Asahd (2019) – songwriting credit.

== See also ==
- Dungeon Family
- OutKast
