= Big Boi =

American rapper (born 1975)

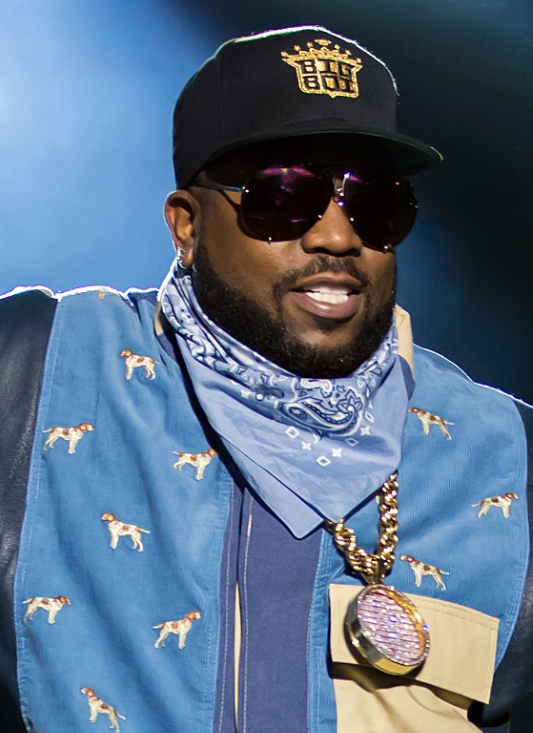
- Big Boi in 2014

Background information
- Also known as: Black Dog; Daddy Fat Sax; Sir Lucious Left Foot; Billy Ocean; Francis the Savannah Chitlin Pimp
- Born: Antwan André Patton; February 1, 1975 (age 51); Savannah, Georgia, U.S.
- Origin: Atlanta, Georgia, U.S.
- Genres: Southern hip-hop; progressive rap; funk
- Occupations: Rapper; songwriter; record producer; actor
- Works: Discography; solo production
- Years active: 1992–present
- Labels: Hitco; Empire; Epic; Def Jam; LaFace; RCA; Jive; Purple Ribbon
- Formerly of: Dungeon Family; Outkast; Purple Ribbon All-Stars; Big Grams
- Spouse: Sherlita Patton (m. 2002; div. 2022)
- Children: 3
- Website: bigboi.com

Antwan André Patton (born February 1, 1975), known professionally as Big Boi, is an American rapper and record producer. Born in Savannah, Georgia, and raised in Atlanta, he was one half of the Southern hip-hop duo Outkast along with rapper André 3000, which the two formed in 1992.

As part of Outkast, the duo's six studio albums were each met with critical and commercial success, spawning hit songs including "Ms. Jackson", "Roses", "So Fresh, So Clean" and "Elevators (Me & You)", among others. Their fifth, a double album titled Speakerboxxx/The Love Below (2003), won three Grammy Awards and contained a solo single performed by Patton: "The Way You Move" (featuring Sleepy Brown), which peaked atop the Billboard Hot 100 and was named the 22nd most successful song of the 2000s decade by Billboard. After the duo split in 2007, he signed with Def Jam Recordings to pursue a solo career; his debut studio album, Sir Lucious Left Foot: The Son of Chico Dusty (2010), peaked at number three on the Billboard 200 and yielded critical acclaim. His second and third albums, Vicious Lies and Dangerous Rumors (2012) and Boomiverse (2017), were both met with continued praise and moderate commercial reception.

His spin-off projects include a collaborative recording outfit with Phantogram, with whom he has released one extended play (2015). He formed the now-defunct supergroup Purple Ribbon All-Stars in 2004, which included Janelle Monáe, Bubba Sparxxx, and Killer Mike; the group released two albums until disbanding in 2007.

Big Boi performed at the Super Bowl LIII halftime show as a guest of Maroon 5. In 2025, he was inducted into the Rock and Roll Hall of Fame as a member of Outkast.

== Early life ==
Patton was born and spent the first half of his childhood in Savannah, Georgia, attending Herschel V. Jenkins High School, before moving to Atlanta with his aunt Renee. He decided to pursue his interest in music at Tri-Cities High School, a visual and performing arts magnet school.

Patton credited his grandmother with getting him interested in music by sending him and his siblings to the store to buy 45 records. He further credited his uncle with introducing him to a wider variety of music, specifically Kate Bush, who he has described as his favorite artist.

== Career ==
=== Outkast ===
Patton met André Lauren Benjamin (stage name André 3000) while attending Tri-Cities High School. The two joined forces as Outkast in 1992 and signed with the regionally-based record label LaFace Records as a duo. Patton originally performed under the stage name Black Dog.

=== Solo career ===
After four successful albums, Big Boi and André 3000 chose to make two solo albums and release them in 2003 as a single double album under the Outkast name called Speakerboxxx/The Love Below; Big Boi recorded Speakerboxxx, André 3000 recorded The Love Below. Speakerboxxx featured a style similar to Outkast's previous efforts, while The Love Below explored a more offbeat territory, with André 3000 mainly singing rather than his usual rapping.

Big Boi released two of his songs as singles. "The Way You Move", featuring Sleepy Brown, was originally supported by urban radio, but crossed over to pop charts, where it supplanted André 3000's "Hey Ya!" as the No. 1 song. The second single from Big Boi was "Ghetto Musick", which featured both members of Outkast and a sample from Patti LaBelle's "Love, Need and Want You".

In November 2005, Big Boi released a mixtape/compilation album, Got Purp? Vol 2, in conjunction with the Purple Ribbon All-Stars through Purple Ribbon Records. The first single from the album was "Kryptonite", which reached 35 on the Billboard Hot 100. Outkast was also featured on the song "International Players Anthem (I Choose You)", the first single from UGK's album Underground Kingz.

In 2007, after Idlewild, the sixth official OutKast duo album, Big Boi announced plans to release a proper solo album. Speakerboxxx had been seen by many as a solo album (and it effectively was one), but it was still released under the OutKast name, which made Sir Lucious Left Foot: The Son of Chico Dusty his first "full-fledged" solo album. The album's first promotional single, "Royal Flush", was released in 2007, and featured Raekwon and André 3000. Over the next few years the album was delayed many times, but multiple promotional and video singles were released, such as "Shine Blockas" (featuring Gucci Mane), "For Yo Sorrows" (featuring George Clinton and Too Short), and "General Patton" (featuring Big Rube). The first official single was "Shutterbugg", featuring Cutty, and the second was "Follow Us", featuring Vonnegutt. The album was formally released in July 2010. Guest artists included Janelle Monáe, T.I., B.o.B., and, on a hook, Big Boi's old Dungeon Family friend Khujo. Sir Lucious Left Foot: The Son of Chico Dusty was warmly received by most music critics, earning praise for its inventive sound, varied musical style, and Big Boi's lyricism.

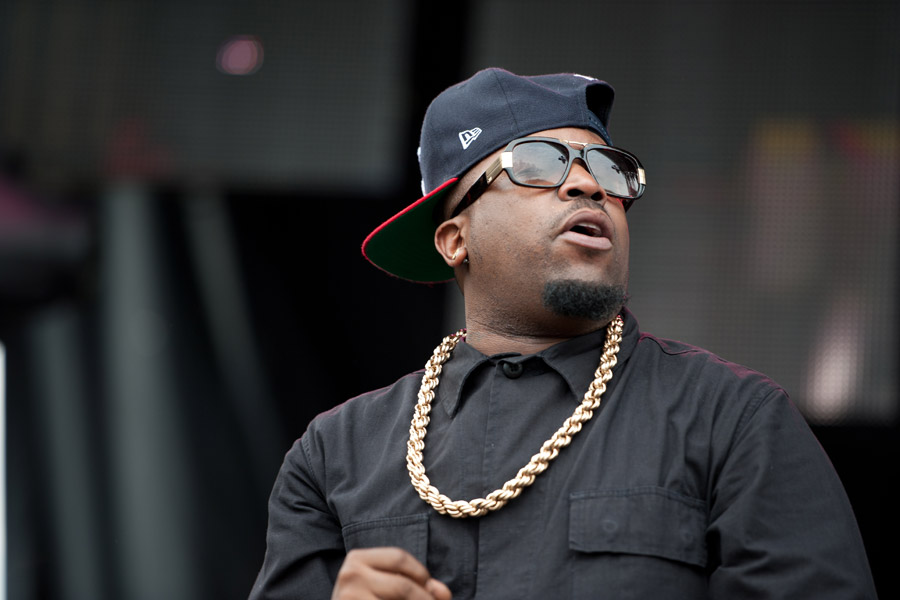
Big Boi at Counterpoint Festival 2012

In a July 2010 interview for The Village Voice, Big Boi revealed that he was working on the follow-up album to Sir Lucious Left Foot, entitled Vicious Lies and Dangerous Rumors, stating that he was "maybe about six songs into it". It was released on November 13, 2012. The first single from the album was "Mama Told Me" featuring Kelly Rowland. The album featured guest appearances from ASAP Rocky, Ludacris, T.I., Little Dragon, Phantogram, Kelly Rowland and B.o.B.

Later in 2012, Big Boi revealed that he had written ten songs for his third studio album. He reiterated his plans for a new studio album in January 2014. He was featured on the Catch The Throne mixtape with the song "Mother of Dragons", it was released for free download on SoundCloud by HBO on March 7, 2014, to promote the fourth season of Game of Thrones.

Big Boi had signed a management deal with Jordan Feldstein's Career Artist Management in 2014, same year signed a record deal with Epic Records.

On April 19, 2017, Big Boi revealed that his third studio album would be titled Boomiverse, and that two singles, "Mic Jack" (featuring Adam Levine) and "Kill Jill" (featuring Killer Mike and Jeezy), would be released the following day. The track "All Night" from Boomiverse was used in the 2017 Apple iPhone X commercial which saw Alana Greszata lip syncing to the song for the "Animoji yourself" feature.

In 2018, Big Boi signed with L.A. Reid and Charles Goldstuck's newfound label Hitco.

In 2019, Big Boi performed at the Super Bowl LIII halftime show. Along with other performers, he was criticized for agreeing to participate despite the U.S. national anthem protests by Colin Kaepernick and others.

In November 2021, Big Boi announced that he had recorded a song with the British singer-songwriter Kate Bush, who Big Boi has repeatedly expressed his admiration for throughout his career.

=== Acting ===
Big Boi appeared as a guest star on seasons 3 and 5 of Nick Cannon's Wild 'n Out, and did so on Chappelle's Show, where he performed his song "The Rooster". In 2006, he branched into feature film acting, appearing in ATL and Idlewild, followed by a starring role in 2007's Who's Your Caddy? He appeared in the Law & Order: Special Victims Unit episode "Wildlife", which aired November 18, 2008. Big Boi played hip-hop artist Gots Money. Big Boi appeared in an episode of the horror anthology web television series Creepshow.

=== Atlanta Ballet collaboration ===
In 2008, Big Boi developed a show with the Atlanta Ballet, billed as "the first major collaboration between a hip-hop luminary and a ballet company". The production, titled big, with choreography by Lauri Stallings, involved Big Boi performing music on stage alongside the ballet dancers. It was described by the New York Times as a "mixed-media spectacular, which includes local children, video and a series of complicated set pieces, and integrates the loose narrative of a child named 'Little big' with mythic characters like Theia". The production included a live band and featured a variety of musical tracks, including "Patton's unreleased single Sir Lucious Leftfoot Saves the Day and a fusion of Giuseppe Verdi's La Traviata with the OutKast track Morris Brown", as well as performances from other local Atlanta artists such as Sleepy Brown, Big Rube, and Janelle Monáe. Big Boi had originally been approached by the Atlanta Ballet’s artistic director, John McFall, about the idea. McFall was interested in finding ways to attract new audiences to the ballet, and both Big Boi and the Atlanta Ballet were interested in the creative challenge presented by the project, "seeking to expand the horizons of their respective forms". big premiered at the Fox Theater in Atlanta on April 10, 2008 for a run of six shows, and received "rave reviews".

== Personal life ==
Patton has three children, two sons and a daughter with his ex-wife, Sherlita. Patton and Sherlita divorced in June 2022, citing irreconcilable differences.

Patton is a registered Pit bull and French Bulldog breeder, and owns a 40-acre ranch outside of Atlanta he calls "the Ritz Carlton for Dogs." He is also the owner of two owls named Hootie and Hoodini.

In 2009, together with Janice Faison Ahmed, Patton started Celebrity Trailers, an RV rental company created for professionals in the film, entertainment, and sports industries.

In August 2011, Patton was returning from a cruise when a U.S. Immigration and Customs Enforcement drug dog at the Port of Miami alerted officers. Patton was arrested and charged with illegal possession of the controlled substance MDMA (in powder form) and Viagra. Patton was released from the Miami-Dade County jail on a $16,000 bond.

In 2013, Patton hurt his knee during a performance while attempting an air kick at the Summer Camp Music Festival. Doctors determined that he tore his patella, and after surgery Patton had to postpone several tour dates.

In 2021, Patton became a grandfather.

Patton is a long-time fan of Kate Bush and was her presenter for her induction into the Rock and Roll Hall of Fame in 2023.

=== Politics and endorsements ===
The City of East Point, Georgia, presented Big Boi with the city's 2021 Global Icon Award and Key to the City for his contribution to the music industry and elevation of the City of East Point.

In an interview with New York City's Hot 97, Big Boi stated that the day after the 2012 United States presidential election, a woman approached him at an airport and congratulated him on "his win last night" (referring to Barack Obama winning re-election), to which Big Boi responded, "Bitch, I voted for Gary Johnson." In a video interview with the HuffPost in January 2013, he confirmed his libertarian political ideologies. Big Boi has also criticized the two-party system, advocating for political independence and personal responsibility. He has emphasized the importance of individual liberty and expressed skepticism toward government overreach, including mass surveillance programs revealed by Edward Snowden, which he has cited as examples of excessive government intrusion.

In 2006, Big Boi founded the Big Kidz Foundation, a nonprofit organization to help youth in Atlanta. The Foundation's mission is to provide culturally-diverse experiences in the field of humanities while helping create socially-conscious youth. In January 2010, Big Boi and the executive director, Jennifer Shephard Lester, launched the Big Kidz Foundation in Savannah, Georgia. Lester also started the Rene Patton Scholarship, named after Big Boi's late aunt, and the "Saving Lives Through the Arts Campaign.""

In 2010, Big Boi launched his custom Chuck Taylor sneakers with Converse. The shoes feature the title of his Def Jam solo album debut: Sir Lucious Left Foot on the left, and Son of Chico Dusty on the right. His Big Boi logo is featured on the tongue of the shoe.

In 2015, Big Boi announced on the Rap Radar Podcast that he supported Bernie Sanders for President.

== Discography ==
Studio albums

- Sir Lucious Left Foot: The Son of Chico Dusty (2010)
- Vicious Lies and Dangerous Rumors (2012)
- Boomiverse (2017)

== Filmography ==
=== Film ===
Year	Title	Role	Notes
2002	Uncovered: The Series-Outkast	Himself	
2004	20 Funerals	Lucious	
2004	The Industry	Himself	
2006	ATL	Marcus	
2006	Idlewild	"Rooster"	
2007	Who's Your Caddy?	Christopher "C-Note" Hawkins	
2008	How 2 Build a Rapper	Industry Professional	
2009	Kiss and Tail: The Hollywood Jumpoff	Himself	
2010	Kings of the Underground: The Dramatic Journey of UGK	Himself	
2011	Mr Immortality: The Life and Times of Twista	Himself	
2012	CounterPoint Music Festival	Himself	
2014	What Is Jai Paul	Himself	
2016	The Art of Organized Noize	Himself	
2017	Baby Driver	Restaurant Patron #1	
2018	Superfly	Mayor Atkins	
2018	The Andre 3000 Documentary	Himself	
2019	The Trap	Himself	
2020	LA Originals	Himself	

=== Television ===
Year	Title	Role	Notes
2006	King of the Hill	Reverend Nealy (voice)	Episode: "Church Hopping"
2006–2007	Girlfriends	Himself	3 episodes
2008	Law & Order: Special Victims Unit	"Gots Money"	Episode: "Wildlife"
2010	Freaknik: The Musical	The Preacher	Television film
2011	The Cookout 2	"Peanut"	Television film
2012	The Playlist	Remix Victim – ScreenWerks	Episode: "Instruments of Destruction"
2012	Single Ladies	Himself	Episode: "Slave to Love"
2017	Star	Himself	Episode: "Next of Kin"
2017	Animals	Fox 2	Episode: "Pigeons"
2019	The Bobby DeBarge Story	Berry Gordy	Television film
2019	Scream	Police Officer	2 episodes
2019	Creepshow	Pawnbroker	Episode: "All Hallow's Eve/The Man in the Suitcase"
2020	Celebrity Family Feud	Himself	Season premiere
2022	The Future of	Himself	Episode: "Dogs"

=== Video games ===
Year	Title	Role	Notes
2007	Def Jam: Icon	Himself (voice)	
2013	Army of Two: The Devil's Cartel	Charles "Chuy" Rendall (voice)	
