= André 3000 discography =

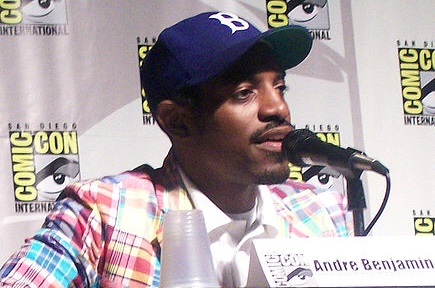
- 3000 at the 2007 San Diego Comic-Con
- Studio albums: 1
- Extended plays: 3
- Soundtrack albums: 1
- Singles: 16

The discography of American rapper André 3000 consists of one studio album, a soundtrack album, three extended plays (EPs), three singles as a lead artist, and thirteen singles as a featured artist.

André 3000 embarked on his musical career in 1991, as a member of the Southern hip hop group OutKast, alongside fellow Atlanta-based rapper Big Boi. Together they have recorded and released six studio albums, and their singles "Ms. Jackson", "Hey Ya!" (performed by André 3000), and "The Way You Move" (performed by Big Boi), have each topped the US Billboard Hot 100.

== Albums ==
=== Studio albums ===
List of albums, with selected details and peak chart positions
Title	Album details	Peak chart positions		
Title	Album details	US	US Alt	US New Age
New Blue Sun	Released: November 17, 2023; Label: Epic; Format: Streaming, digital download, LP, CD	34	5	1

=== Soundtracks ===
List of soundtracks, with selected details
Title	Soundtrack details
Class of 3000: Music Volume One	Released: July 3, 2007; Label: LaFace; Format: CD, digital download

== EPs ==
List of EPs, with selected details
Title	EP details
Look Ma No Hands	Released: May 13, 2018; Label: Self-released; Format: Free download
Moving Day	Released: November 22, 2024; Label: Epic; Format: Digital download, streaming
7 Piano Sketches	Released: May 5, 2025; Label: Epic; Format: Digital download, streaming

== Singles ==
=== As lead artist ===
List of singles as featured artist, with selected chart positions and certifications, showing year released and album name
Title	Year	Peak chart positions					Certifications	Album
Title	Year	US	US R&B /HH	US Chr.	IRL	NZ Hot	Certifications	Album
"Life of the Party" (Kanye West and André 3000)	2021	113	47	3	96	16		Donda (Deluxe)
"Scientists & Engineers" (Killer Mike and André 3000 featuring Future and Eryn Allen Kane)	2023	—	—	—	—	—		Michael
"Dream State" (Kamasi Washington and André 3000)	2024	—	—	—	—	—		Fearless Movement
"—" denotes a recording that did not chart or was not released in that territory.

=== As featured artist ===
List of singles as featured artist, with selected chart positions and certifications, showing year released and album name
Title	Year	Peak chart positions										Certifications	Album
Title	Year	US	US R&B	AUS	BEL	CAN	GER	IRL	NZL	SWI	UK	Certifications	Album
"It's Ok" (Slimm Calhoun featuring André 3000)	2001	—	—	—	—	—	—	—	—	—	—		The Skinny
"Nectarine" (Cherokee featuring Andre 3000)	2001												Soul Parade
"Millionaire" (Kelis featuring André 3000)	2004	—	—	23	36	—	65	8	27	43	3	BPI: Gold	Tasty
"Everybody" (Fonzworth Bentley featuring Andre 3000 & Kanye West)	2007	—	—	—	—	—	—	—	—	—	—		Non-album single
"What a Job" (Devin the Dude featuring André 3000 and Snoop Dogg)	2007	—	124	—	—	—	—	—	—	—	—		Waitin' to Inhale
"Royal Flush" (Big Boi featuring André 3000 and Raekwon)	2008	—	68	—	—	—	—	—	—	—	—		Non-album single
"Green Light" (John Legend featuring André 3000)	2008	24	6	—	52	80	52	—	—	81	35	RIAA: 2× Platinum	Evolver
"Dedication to My Ex (Miss That)" (Lloyd featuring André 3000)	2011	79	43	3	137	33	52	5	14	—	3	BPI: Gold; ARIA: 3× Platinum; RIANZ: Gold; IFPI Denmark: Gold	King of Hearts
"Party" (Beyoncé featuring André 3000)	2011	50	2	—	—	—	—	—	—	—	—	RIAA: Platinum	4
"Play the Guitar" (B.o.B featuring André 3000)	2011	98	—	—	—	—	—	—	—	—	—		Non-album single
"I Do" (Jeezy featuring Jay-Z and André 3000)	2012	61	4	—	—	—	—	—	—	—	—		Thug Motivation 103: Hustlerz Ambition
"DoYaThing" (Gorillaz featuring James Murphy & André 3000)	2012	—	—	—	—	—	—	—	—	—	— (Note: "DoYaThing" did not enter the UK Singles Chart, but peaked at number 35 on the UK Physical Singles Chart.)		Non-album single
"Sorry" (T.I. featuring André 3000)	2012	116	36	—	—	—	—	—	—	—	—		Trouble Man: Heavy is the Head
"—" denotes a recording that did not chart or was not released in that territory.

== Other charted and certified songs ==
List of other charted and certified songs, showing year released and album name
Title	Year	Peak chart positions				Certification	Album
Title	Year	US	US R&B Bub.	US Rock/Alt.	NZ Hot	Certification	Album
"Pink Matter" (Frank Ocean featuring André 3000)	2013	—	—	—	—	ARIA: Gold	Channel Orange
"Solo (Reprise)" (Frank Ocean featuring André 3000)	2016	— (Note: "Solo (Reprise)" did not enter the Billboard Hot 100, but peaked at number 24 on the Bubbling Under Hot 100 Singles chart.)	2	—	—		Blonde
"The Ends" (Travis Scott featuring André 3000)	2016	—	2	—	—	RIAA: Platinum	Birds in the Trap Sing McKnight
"I Swear, I Really Wanted to Make a 'Rap' Album but This Is Literally the Way the Wind Blew Me This Time"	2023	90	—	12	10		New Blue Sun
"The Slang Word P(*)ssy Rolls Off the Tongue with Far Better Ease Than the Proper Word Vagina. Do You Agree?"	2023	— (Note: "The Slang Word P(*)ssy Rolls Off the Tongue with Far Better Ease Than the Proper Word Vagina. Do You Agree?" did not enter the Billboard Hot 100, but peaked at number 23 on the Bubbling Under Hot 100 Singles chart.)	—	22	20		New Blue Sun
"That Night in Hawaii When I Turned into a Panther and Started Making These Low Register Purring Tones That I Couldn't Control ... Sh¥t Was Wild"	2023	—	—	28	28		New Blue Sun
"BuyPoloDisorder's Daughter Wears a 3000® Button Down Embroidered"	2023	—	—	37	—		New Blue Sun
"Ninety Three 'Til Infinity and Beyoncé"	2023	—	—	30	—		New Blue Sun
"Ants to You, Gods to Who?"	2023	—	—	44	—		New Blue Sun
"—" denotes a recording that did not chart or was not released in that territory.

== Guest appearances ==
Title	Year	Artist(s)	Album
"Sumthin' Wicked This Way Comes"	1994	TLC	CrazySexyCool
"Thought Process"	1995	Goodie Mob	Soul Food
"Crooked Booty"	2001	Cee-Lo, Khujo Goodie, Sleepy Brown	Even in Darkness
"Rollin'"	2001	Cee-Lo, Society of Soul	Even in Darkness
"Boogie Man"	2003	Big Gipp	Mutant Mindframe
"Long Way to Go"	2004	Gwen Stefani	Love. Angel. Music. Baby.
"Junglebook"	2005	Esthero	Wikked Lil' Girls
"30 Something" (Remix)	2006	Jay-Z, Ice Cube	—N/a
"I Want You" (Remix)	2007	Lloyd, Nas	Street Love
"Throw Some D's" (Remix)	2007	Rich Boy, Jim Jones, Murphy Lee, Nelly, The Game	Rich Boy
"Ride" (Bei Maejor Remix)	2010	Ciara, Bei Maejor, Ludacris	—N/a
"Lookin' 4 Ya"	2010	Big Boi, Sleepy Brown	—N/a
"Lookin' 4 Ya" (Jedi Remix)	2010	Big Boi, Sleepy Brown	—N/a
"Deuces" (Remix)	2010	Chris Brown, Drake, T.I., Kanye West, Fabolous, Rick Ross	—N/a
"Sleazy" (Remix)	2011	Kesha, Lil Wayne, Wiz Khalifa, T.I.	—N/a
"Interlude"	2011	Lil Wayne, Tech N9ne	Tha Carter IV
"The Real Her"	2011	Drake, Lil Wayne	Take Care
"Sixteen"	2012	Rick Ross	God Forgives, I Don't
"Pink Matter"	2012	Frank Ocean	Channel Orange
"Farrah Fawcett Hair"	2013	Capital Cities	In a Tidal Wave of Mystery
"Back to Black"	2013	Beyoncé	The Great Gatsby: Music from Baz Luhrmann's Film
"Benz Friendz (Whatchutola)"	2014	Future	Honest
"Hello"	2015	Erykah Badu	But U Cain’t Use My Phone
"30 Hours"	2016	Kanye West	The Life of Pablo
"Solo (Reprise)"	2016	Frank Ocean	Blonde
"The Ends"	2016	Travis Scott	Birds in the Trap Sing McKnight
"Decemba (Remix)"	2016	Divine Council	—N/a
"Junie"	2016	Solange	A Seat at the Table
"Kids..."	2016	A Tribe Called Quest	We Got It from Here... Thank You 4 Your Service
"By Design"	2016	Kid Cudi	Passion, Pain & Demon Slayin'
"The Guide"	2016	Kid Cudi	Passion, Pain & Demon Slayin'
"Rollinem 7's"	2017	N*E*R*D, Pharrell Williams	No One Ever Really Dies
"Where's the Catch?"	2019	James Blake	Assume Form
"Come Home"	2019	Anderson .Paak	Ventura
"No Cigar"	2020	Goodie Mob	Survival Kit
"To the Moon"	2024	Shabaka	Possession
"Birthworkers Magic, and How We Get Hear"	2024	Carlos Niño	Placenta
"Infinite Palaces of Possibility/Horse"	2024	Nate Mercereau	Excellent Traveler

== Solo production discography ==
Note: André 3000 also produced several songs on OutKast's albums with partner Big Boi, where they were credited as simply OutKast or as their production outfit Earthtone III, which included Mr. DJ.

List of production and songwriting credits (excluding guest appearances, interpolations, and samples)
Track(s)	Year	Credit	Artist(s)	Album
8. "Millionaire"; (featuring André 3000)	2003	Producer	Kelis	Tasty
7. "Boogie Man"; (featuring André 3000)	2003	Producer	Big Gipp	Mutant Mindframe
3. "Akshon (Yeah!)"; (featuring André 3000)	2003	Producer	Killer Mike	Monster
9. "U Know I Love U"	2003	Producer	Killer Mike	Monster
15. "Re-Akshon"; (featuring T.I., Bone Crusher and Bun B)	2003	Producer	Killer Mike	Monster
5. "Bubble Pop Electric"; (featuring Johnny Vulture)	2004	Producer	Gwen Stefani	Love. Angel. Music. Baby.
12. "Long Way to Go"; (featuring André 3000)	2004	Producer	Gwen Stefani	Love. Angel. Music. Baby.
23. "Outro"	2005	Songwriter	Uncle Mooney	Got Purp? Vol. 2
8. "You Ain't No DJ"; (featuring Yelawolf)	2010	Producer	Big Boi	Sir Lucious Left Foot: The Son of Chico Dusty
"DoYaThing" (featuring James Murphy and André 3000)	2012	Producer (with Gorillaz)	Gorillaz	Non-album single
10. "Nothing Compares 2 U"	2014	Producer	Aretha Franklin	Aretha Franklin Sings the Great Diva Classics
2. "Fire"	2018	Producer (with Kanye West, Kid Cudi and BoogzDaBeast)	Kids See Ghosts	Kids See Ghosts
7. "SCIENTISTS & ENGINEERS"; (with André 3000 featuring Future and Eryn Allen Kane)	2023	Producer (with DJ Paul, No I.D., James Blake, and Twhy Exclusive)	Killer Mike	Michael

== See also ==
- Outkast discography
