= Everybody Knows (John Legend song) =

Single by John Legend

from the album Evolver
- Released: March 23, 2009
- Recorded: 2008
- Genre: Soul; R&B; pop
- Length: 4:35
- Label: GOOD; Sony Music
- Songwriters: John Stephens; Kawan Prather; James Ho; Terrence Smith; Demetria McKinney
- Producers: Malay; KP

John Legend singles chronology
"Magnificent" (2009)	"Everybody Knows" (2009)	"Whatever U Want" (2009)

"Everybody Knows" is a song by American singer John Legend, released as the third single from his third studio album, Evolver. The song was released as a download single in the UK on March 23, 2009, which coincided with his UK tour for Evolver.

== Music video ==
The music video for "Everybody Knows" premiered on 20 January 2009. It was directed by Anthony Mandler. The video for "Everybody Knows" features Legend walking through city streets and a park along with a couple arguing and making up in the street, an elderly couple sitting on a bench in the park, reading a book along with other situations featuring couples. The video is portrayed as being set in New York City, however, much of it was filmed in Providence, Rhode Island.

== Formats and track listings ==
UK Digital Download

1. "Everybody Knows" [4:35]
2. "Everybody Knows" (Live from World Cafe) [5:24]
3. "Green Light" (Karmatronic Club Mix) (featuring Andre 3000) [6:21]

Official Versions

1. Everybody Knows (Album Version) [4:35]
2. Everybody Knows (Afroganic Radio Edit) [3:39]
3. Everybody Knows (Live from World Cafe) [5:24]
4. Everybody Knows (Love to Infinity Radio Edit) [4:02]

== Charts ==
=== Weekly charts ===
Chart (2008–2009)	Peak position
Netherlands (Dutch Top 40)	10
Netherlands (Single Top 100)	80
US Hot R&B/Hip-Hop Songs (Billboard)	64

=== Year-end charts ===
Chart (2008)	Position
Netherlands (Dutch Top 40)	97
