= Rainbow Revisited =

Studio album by Thandi Ntuli and Carlos Niño
- Released: 17 November 2023
- Genre: Jazz
- Length: 48:17
- Label: Ndlela; International Anthem
- Producer: Carlos Niño

Thandi Ntuli chronology
| Blk Elijah & The Children of Meroë (2022) | Rainbow Revisited (2023) |

Rainbow Revisited is a collaborative studio album by South African musician Thandi Ntuli and American composer and producer Carlos Niño, released on 17 November 2023, through Ndlela Music and International Anthem Recording Company. It received positive reviews from critics.

== Recording ==
The album mainly consists of piano and Ntuli's voice, and was recorded in two days in a studio Venice Beach, California.

== Critical reception ==
Professional ratings
Aggregate scores
| Source | Rating |
|---|---|
| Metacritic | 83/100 |
Review scores
| Source | Rating |
| AllMusic | 4/5 stars |
| The Guardian | 4/5 stars |
| Mojo | 4/5 stars |
| Pitchfork | 7.8/10 |

Rainbow Revisited received a score of 83 out of 100 on review aggregator Metacritic based on four critics' reviews, indicating "universal acclaim". Mojo called it "a brave, stand-alone release that lays her talent bare" and "a beautiful unreal entrancement you'll find hard to stop listening to again and again". Pitchfork's Piotr Orlov felt that it "edits down such big-budget ambitions", calling the music "spare, laser focused on those incandescent gospel melodies that feel like a Mzansi jazz birthright, and on ways to minimally ornament them for a broader, internationalist (Anthem and otherwise) audience".

Ammar Kalia of The Guardian described it as Ntuli's "most minimal effort yet" as well as "a masterclass in the eloquent potential of the solo, a quiet storm of expression at Ntuli's new frontier of South African jazz". Thom Jurek of AllMusic wrote that "this glorious, vulnerable set offers pure collaborative inspiration at once strident and vulnerable, minimal, and aesthetically expansive" and felt that Niño's "layered ambient sounds find Ntuli's synths offering various flute voicings and soothing unidentifiable sounds as she whisper/scats into the mysterious sounds".

== Track listing ==
Rainbow Revisited track listing
| No. | Title | Length |
|---|---|---|
| 1. | "Sunrise (In California)" | 5:29 |
| 2. | "Rainbow Revisited" | 7:13 |
| 3. | "Breath and Synth Experiment" | 3:38 |
| 4. | "Nomayoyo (Ingoma ka Mkhulu)" | 5:34 |
| 5. | "Piano Edit" | 4:22 |
| 6. | "Sunset (In California)" | 5:51 |
| 7. | "Voice and Tongo Experiment" | 2:18 |
| 8. | "The One (First Part)" | 4:01 |
| 9. | "The One (Second Part)" | 4:17 |
| 10. | "Lihlanzekile" | 5:34 |
| Total length: | | 48:17 |
