= I Swear, I Really Wanted to Make a 'Rap' Album but This Is Literally the Way the Wind Blew Me This Time =

Instrumental by André 3000

from the album New Blue Sun
- Released: November 17, 2023
- Genre: Ambient
- Length: 12:20
- Label: Epic
- Songwriters: André Benjamin; Carlos Niño; Nate Mercereau; Surya Botofasina
- Producers: André 3000; Carlos Gabriel Niño

"I Swear, I Really Wanted to Make a 'Rap' Album but This Is Literally the Way the Wind Blew Me This Time" is an instrumental musical piece by American musician André 3000 and the opening track from his debut studio album New Blue Sun (2023). Upon its debut on the Billboard Hot 100, it became the longest recording to chart on the Hot 100, overtaking Tool's "Fear Inoculum". The song was nominated for Grammy Award for Best Instrumental Composition at the 67th Annual Grammy Awards.

== Background ==
In an interview with NPR Music, André 3000 explained the track's title saying: "So the title, "I Really Wanted To Make A Rap Album, But This Is Literally The Way The Wind Blew Me This Time" [is] because this album is about wind and breathing. In that way, it is true. It is literally blowing me this way and I'm blowing flutes and I'm blowing digital instruments." He stated in an interview with The Hollywood Reporter: "As a person who has contributed to rap for so long, of course I’d love to make a rap album. The further I am away from it, the lesser the reality it is for me. I’ve gotten beats from other producers, I tried to do what I’ve always done, produce my own music, but I didn’t like it enough to present it." He chose it as the opening track from New Blue Sun because he wanted to make it clear that the album did not contain rap, not wanting to mislead people.

== Composition ==
The instrumental is ambient, without vocals. It features instrumental contributions from André 3000 on flute, Carlos Niño on percussion and production, Surya Botofasina on keyboard, and Nate Mercereau on guitar.

== Reception ==
AllMusic's Fred Thomas described the track as "among the most structured pieces, moving in patient ripples." Sadie Sartini Garner of Pitchfork described it as flooded with "a mood as blue and deep as the water off Catalina." HipHopDX's Dash Lewis described André 3000's "command of rhythm" as "sinewy and elastic as ever." Gerrod Harris of Spill Magazine wrote that the track is "an exercise in anticipation, but rather than cause tension as it builds, the anticipation is accompanied by a sense of peace." American rapper Lupe Fiasco released a remix to the track, rapping over the instrumental.

The track debuted at number 90 on the Billboard Hot 100 and is André 3000's seventh Hot 100 entry as a solo artist. Upon the track's release, it became the longest recording to chart on the Hot 100, overtaking Tool's "Fear Inoculum". The track was nominated for Best Instrumental Composition at the 67th Annual Grammy Awards.

== Charts ==
Chart performance for "I Swear, I Really Wanted to Make a 'Rap' Album but This Is Literally the Way the Wind Blew Me This Time"
Chart (2023)	Peak position
New Zealand Hot Singles (RMNZ)	10
US Billboard Hot 100	90
US Hot Rock & Alternative Songs (Billboard)	12

== Accolades ==
Year	Award	Result	Ref
2025	Grammy Award for Best Instrumental Composition	Nominated	
