= Whatever U Want (Consequence song) =

Single by Consequence featuring Kanye West and John Legend
- Released: September 29, 2009
- Recorded: 2009
- Genre: Hip hop; electro-hop
- Label: GOOD Music; Universal Motown
- Producers: Kanye West; Jeff Bhasker (co.)

Consequence singles chronology
"Job Song" (2007)	"Whatever U Want" (2009)	"Movement" (2009)

Kanye West singles chronology
"Forever" (2009)	"Whatever U Want" (2009)	"We Are the World 25 for Haiti" (2010)

John Legend singles chronology
"Everybody Knows" (2009)	"Whatever U Want" (2009)	"Movement" (2009)

"Whatever U Want" is a song by American rapper Consequence, released on September 29, 2009, as a stand-alone single. The song features vocals from American singer John Legend and fellow American rapper Kanye West, while the production was handled by West alongside Jeff Bhasker. The music video, directed by Hype Williams, was released in October 2009.

== Remixes ==
The official remix was released by Consequence on November 18, 2009 as "The G.O.O.D. Music Remix", featuring his GOOD Music label-mates Kid Cudi, Common, Big Sean, John Legend and Kanye West. Another official remix was released on January 12, 2010 as "The Bad Boy Remix", featuring Diddy and The LOX. On his 2010 mixtape Movies on Demand, Consequence included “Whatever U Want (G.O.O.D. vs. Bad Megamix)” as the thirteenth track.

== Music video ==
Consequence, West and Legend traveled to Miami on the day of the song's release to film the Hype Williams-directed music video for it. The video was officially released on October 13, 2009.

== Charts ==
Chart (2009)	Peak position
US Bubbling Under R&B/Hip-Hop Singles (Billboard)	4

== Release history ==
Region	Date	Format	Label	Ref.
Various	September 29, 2009	Digital download	GOOD Music; Universal Motown	
