= If You're Out There =

Single by John Legend

from the album Evolver
- Released: August 24, 2008
- Recorded: 2008
- Studio: Legacy Studios; SARM, London and Los Angeles; Capitol, Hollywood
- Genre: Soul; gospel
- Length: 4:20
- Label: GOOD; Sony Music
- Songwriter: John Stephens
- Producers: Trevor Horn; Devo Springsteen; Marcus John Bryant

John Legend singles chronology
"Green Light" (2008)	"If You're Out There" (2008)	"Magnificent" (2009)

"If You're Out There" is the second single from John Legend's album, Evolver, which features the Agape Choir. The song was released digitally on August 24, 2008. It was inspired by Barack Obama's presidential campaign and was later posted as a free download on Obama's website. The song also alludes to Gandhi's quote, "Be the change you want to see in the world," with the lines "We don't have to wait for destiny / we should / be the change that we / want to see.

== Performances ==
=== Democratic National Convention ===
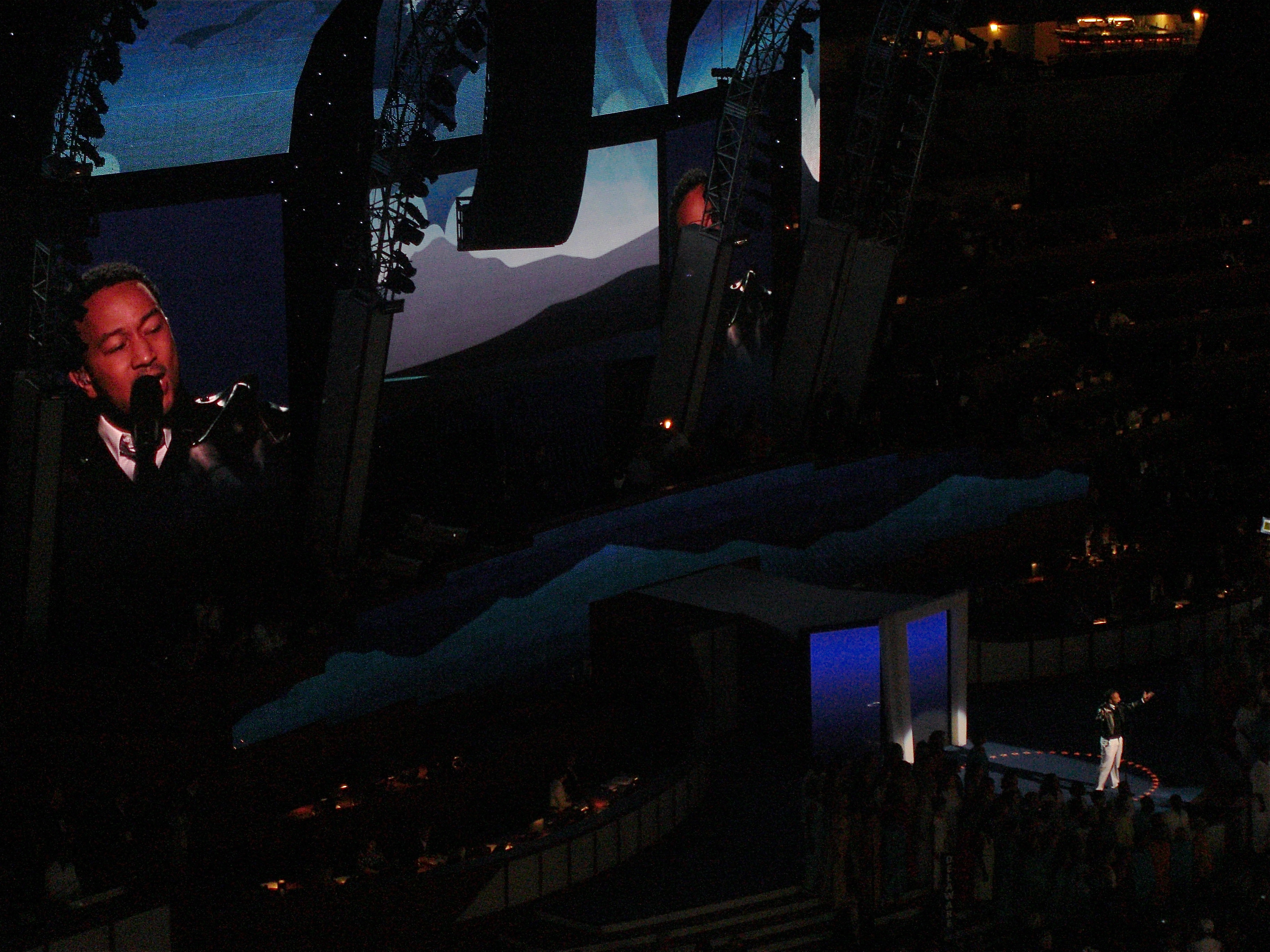
Legend performs "If You're Out There" during the first night of the 2008 Democratic National Convention in Denver, Colorado.

The song was performed live during the Democratic National Convention in Denver on August 25, 2008. The performance featured the Agape International Choir.

=== 2008 Latin Grammy Awards ===
John Legend appeared to perform the song in duet with Colombian rock singer Juanes during the 9th Annual Latin Grammy Awards at the Toyota Center in Houston, Texas on November 13, 2008. The version they performed was sung mostly in Spanish by both singers, with only a few lines in English.

=== 2009 NBA All-Star Game ===
John Legend appeared at halftime of the 2009 NBA All-Star Game and performed the song. Lyrics were alternated between English and Spanish, with the Spanish portions sung by Juanes. The song has been used in "NBA Cares" PSAs which encourage community service.

== Charts ==
Chart (2008)	Peak position
U.S. Billboard Bubbling Under Hot 100 Singles	10
U.S. Billboard Bubbling Under R&B/Hip-Hop Singles	17
UK Singles Chart	135
Dutch Singles Chart	41
