= 7 Piano Sketches =

EP by André 3000
- Released: May 5, 2025
- Recorded: 2010–2013
- Studios: André 3000's home, Texas (excluding "Blueberry Mansions")
- Genres: Instrumental; lo-fi
- Length: 16:21
- Label: Epic
- Producers: André 3000; Benji Bixby

André 3000 chronology
Moving Day (2024)	7 Piano Sketches (2025)

7 Piano Sketches (stylized in lowercase) is the third extended play (EP) by the American musician André 3000. It was released by Epic Records on May 5, 2025. The EP, consisting of seven tracks, was recorded nearly a decade before the release of his debut studio album, New Blue Sun (2023), and was entirely recorded with either his iPhone or laptop microphone inside a sparse Texas house André 3000 and his son had lived in (with the exception of the track "Blueberry Mansions"). He was inspired to record voice memos of piano improvisations because the piano was one of the few objects in the home. André 3000 routinely sent these recordings to friends and family members, never intending to release them to the public.

During his appearance at the 2025 Met Gala, André 3000 surprise-released 7 Piano Sketches, coinciding with his chosen outfit for the event, which featured a grand piano attached to his back. According to an interview with men's magazine GQ, André 3000 decided to release the project after spending time relistening to his old recordings, finding they were of higher quality than he had previously thought. He believed other people might want to buy the songs as well, which encouraged him to release the EP commercially. In June 2026, André 3000 released a short film that serves as a visual companion to the EP on Mubi.

Musically, 7 Piano Sketches is an entirely instrumental project, much like André 3000's previous work as a solo artist. The only exceptions to this rule are brief samples and narrated intros; the latter are done by André 3000 himself, Emmy Paalman, or Fatima Robinson, depending on the track. Excluding the outro track, "I Spend All Day Waiting for the Night", all songs solely utilize a piano in their composition. All tracks on 7 Piano Sketches are improvised, with André 3000 himself stating that he was unable to name any of the piano keys played in the songs. Using an iPhone microphone during recording resulted in many tracks having a lo-fi or otherwise low-quality sound compared to standard recordings, as noted by many music publications that reviewed the project.

== Background and recording ==
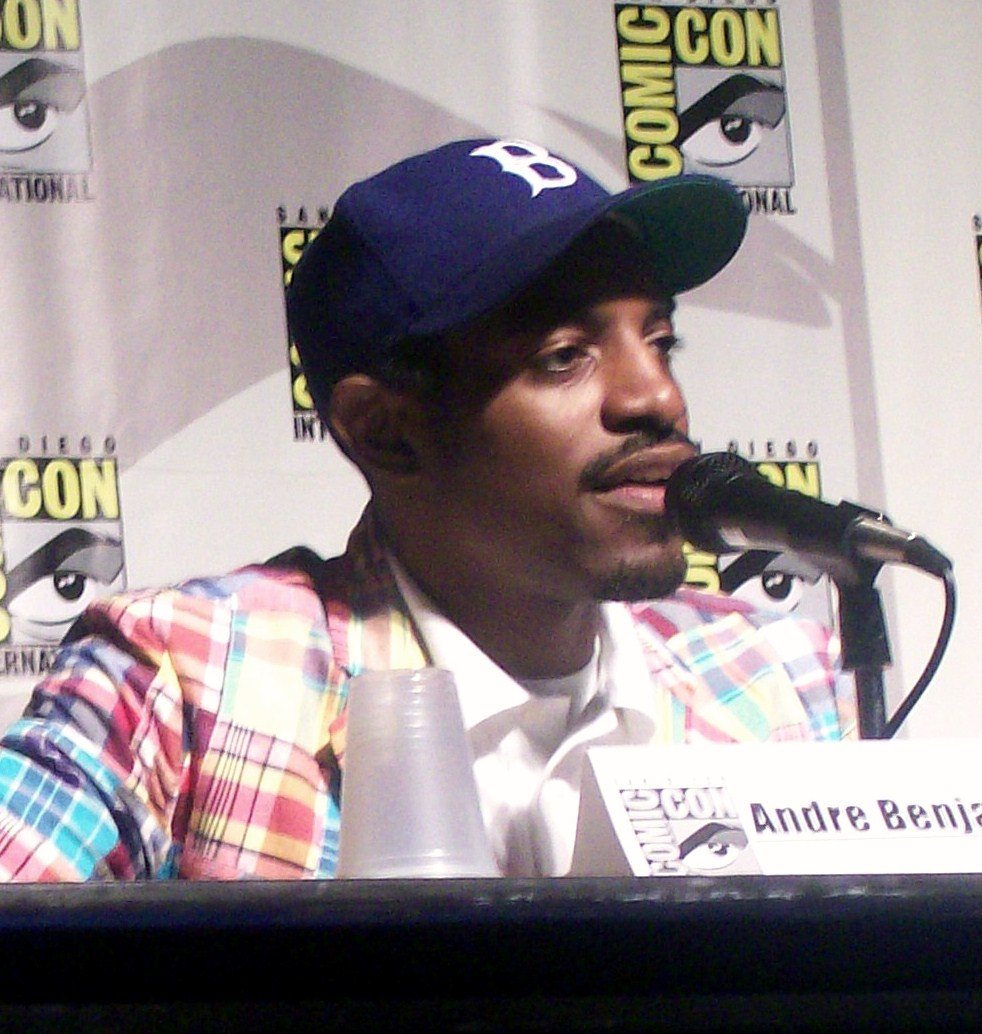
André 3000 in 2007, a few years prior to the conception of 7 Piano Sketches.

A decade before the release on 7 Piano Sketches, André 3000 and his son Seven lived inside a small Texas home, bare of any furniture except for a piano, two beds, and a couple of TV screens. As the house was mostly empty, André 3000 had become interested in its piano, writing improvised compositions to pass the time. He sent these recordings to his family members, such as son Seven and ex-wife Erykah Badu, as well as fellow musicians Q-Tip and Tyler, the Creator.

In an interview with GQ, André 3000 shared that most of the songs on 7 Piano Sketches were recorded between 12 and 15 years before the EPs release. In addition, the tracks "Blueberry Mansions" and "I Spend All Day Waiting for the Night" were first written in 2000 during sessions for the OutKast album Stankonia (2000), and were later recorded alongside his improvisations. In the same interview, André 3000 stated that he was inspired to release 7 Piano Sketches after re-listening to several old compositions, finding them personally enjoyable enough to warrant a commercial release, calling it "a cool piece of music that people might want to have in their arsenal."

Discussing the project, André 3000 revealed that the original title of 7 Piano Sketches was "The Best Worst Rap Album in History", basing the joke on the EP's lack of lyrics, but considers it "the best because it's the free-est emotionally and best I've felt personally", comparing it to a palette cleanser.

== Composition ==
"Hotel Lobby Pianos"
"Hotel Lobby Pianos", an example of the improvisational piano-driven production on 7 Piano Sketches.

7 Piano Sketches is a completely improvised piano album, with most tracks of low sound quality due to André 3000's recording techniques for this EP; most songs are recorded using an iPhone or laptop microphone. The only exception to this is the track "Blueberry Mansions", which was recorded in a studio. Hank Shteamer of Pitchfork felt that this gives most tracks a "grainy" sound, with audible background noise "proudly" left intact. The majority of the songs on 7 Piano Sketches solely use a piano in their composition, though the track "I Spend All Day Waiting for the Night" has one additional instrument, being a steady drum machine.

Regarding the song structures, André 3000 described them as being based on piano improvisations. He explained that his process involved spreading his fingers across the keys and moving them randomly yet deliberately until he discovered something that sounded appealing or intriguing. When he found a sequence that felt particularly good, he would attempt to repeat it. He also noted that he does not know the specific notes, keys, or chords he plays, but is instead drawn to the sound and physical mechanics of playing the piano.

In his announcement post for the project on Instagram, André 3000 cited several composers as influences, including Thelonious Monk, McCoy Tyner, Philip Glass, Stephen Sondheim, Joni Mitchell and Vince Guaraldi.

== Release ==
André 3000 released 7 Piano Sketches shortly after his appearance at the 2025 Met Gala on May 5, 2025, which featured a grand piano on his back as part of his outfit. The EP's cover art is a sketch of this same outfit. Along with confirming they were recorded over a decade before his debut album, New Blue Sun (2023), he stated that the recordings had originated as personal voice memos for friends and family, never intended to be shared with the public. He noted that the project featured "no bars", in reference to high demand from his fanbase for him to return to rapping. André 3000 has since planned to release the EP on vinyl formats, stating that he thinks others would want to put it in their collection.

=== Film ===
In June 2026, André 3000 released a short film inspired by and set to the EP on the streaming platform Mubi. In the film, André 3000 walks across New York City holding a sketch notebook with a piano strapped to his back and runs into various characters who reflect his musical identity.

== Critical reception ==
Professional ratings
Aggregate scores
Source	Rating
Metacritic	69/100
Review scores
Source	Rating
Clash	5/10
Pitchfork	7/10
PopMatters	8/10
Rolling Stone	3/5 stars

7 Piano Sketches received mixed-to-positive reviews from critics. According to the review aggregator Metacritic, 7 Piano Sketches received "generally favorable reviews" based on a weighted average score of 69 out of 100 from 4 critic scores.

Robin Murray of Clash characterized 7 Piano Sketches as insubstantial, calling it more of a bookmark than a complete work. Hank Shteamer of Pitchfork viewed the album as part of a broader artistic experiment, exploring what occurs when an artist rejects the career-driven nature of pop music in favor of a quieter, less goal-oriented path. Teo Blake Beauchamp of PopMatters considered the release to be more of a glimpse into an evolving creative process than a fully refined project, yet one that offers valuable insight into André 3000's continuous artistic transformation. Rob Sheffield of Rolling Stone described the album as a celebration of pure enthusiasm, portraying André 3000's spontaneous piano playing as an act of creative freedom unburdened by expectations or legacy.

== Track listing ==
All tracks are written by André Benjamin. All tracks are produced by André 3000 and Benji Bixby.

No.	Title	Length
1.	"Bluffing in the Snow"	2:58
2.	"And Then One Day You'll..."	2:28
3.	"When You're a Ant and You Wake Up in an Awesome Mood, About to Drive Your Son to School, Only to Discover That You Left the Lights on in the Car Last Night So Your Battery Is Drained"	0:54
4.	"Hotel Lobby Pianos"	2:37
5.	"Blueberry Mansions"	1:57
6.	"Off Rhythm Laughter"	3:31
7.	"I Spend All Day Waiting for the Night"	1:53
Total length:		16:21

Notes

- Track titles are stylized in lowercase.

== Personnel ==
Credits are adapted from Tidal.

- André 3000 – composer, lyricist, producer, recording engineer, vocal producer, vocals (1–2, 4–5)
- Benji Bixby – producer
- Emmy Paalman – assistant engineer, vocals (2–4, 6)
- Fatima Robinson – vocals (3–5)
- JC Chiam – recording engineer
- Ken Oriole – recording engineer
- Johnathan "Jonny" Gorenc – assistant engineer
- Fab Dupont – mastering engineer
- Carlos Niño – vocal producer
