= Magnificent (Rick Ross song) =

Single by Rick Ross featuring John Legend

from the album Deeper Than Rap
- Released: February 24, 2009
- Recorded: 2009
- Genre: Hip hop; mafioso rap; R&B
- Length: 4:19
- Label: Maybach; Slip-n-Slide; Def Jam
- Songwriters: Erik Ortiz; John Stephens; Angela Bofill; Jeffrey Cohen; Narada Michael Walden
- Producer: J.U.S.T.I.C.E. League

Rick Ross singles chronology
| "Mafia Music" (2009) | "Magnificent" (2009) | "What It Is" (2009) |

John Legend singles chronology
| "If You're Out There" (2008) | "Magnificent" (2009) | "Everybody Knows" (2009) |

"Magnificent" is the first official single from Rick Ross's third album Deeper Than Rap. It features John Legend and is produced by J.U.S.T.I.C.E. League. It is a R&B and hip hop song that samples "Gotta Make It Up To You" by Angela Bofill and also contains an interpolation of "I'm The Magnificent" by Special Ed.

== Remix ==
The official remix was made which features John Legend, Big Boi, Special Ed & Diddy.

== Music video ==
The music video has cameo appearances from DJ Khaled, Birdman, Ace Hood, Triple C's and Special Ed. It was released on March 3, 2009 and it was directed by music video director Gil Green. It was filmed at Gulfstream Park Racetrack in Hallandale Beach, Florida.

== Charts ==
=== Weekly charts ===
| Chart (2009) | Peak position |
| US Billboard Hot 100 | 62 |
| US Hot R&B/Hip-Hop Songs (Billboard) | 7 |
| US Hot Rap Songs (Billboard) | 5 |

=== Year-end charts ===
| Chart (2009) | Position |
| US Hot R&B/Hip-Hop Songs (Billboard) | 60 |
