= Green Light (John Legend song) =

2008 single by John Legend and André 3000

Single by John Legend featuring André 3000

from the album Evolver
- Released: July 29, 2008
- Studio: Wine-O-Cellar (College Park, Georgia); PatchWerk Recording Studios (Atlanta, Georgia)
- Genre: R&B; funk; electro
- Length: 4:44
- Label: GOOD; Columbia; Sony
- Songwriters: John Stephens; Andre Benjamin; Rick Nowels; Fin Greenall; James Ho
- Producers: Malay; KP

John Legend singles chronology
"Each Day Gets Better" (2008)	"Green Light" (2008)	"If You're Out There" (2008)

André 3000 singles chronology
"Royal Flush" (2008)	"Green Light" (2008)	"Dedication to My Ex (Miss That)" (2011)

Alternative cover
- Digital cover

Music video
- "Green Light" on YouTube

"Green Light" is a song recorded by American R&B recording artist John Legend. It was written by Legend, Andre Benjamin, Fin Greenall, James Ho, and Rick Nowels, and was produced by Malay and KP, for his third studio album, Evolver (2008). The song was released on July 29, 2008, as the lead single from the album, through Columbia Records. The song features vocals from American rapper André 3000. "Green Light" shows a shift in musical style for Legend, opting for a funk and electro sound composed of electronic synths and fast, synthesized beats. The song also features the use of several horn instruments, including the saxophone, trombone and trumpet.

"Green Light" was well received by contemporary music critics who praised it for its departure in musical style and called it a "certified club banger". The single performed well on the charts, reaching number twenty-four on the Billboard Hot 100, tying for "Ordinary People" as Legend's highest peaking single on the chart at the time. It also stood as his best-selling single, earning a platinum certification by the Recording Industry Association of America (RIAA) until "All of Me" sold 4 million downloads by September 2014. It reached its highest peak in Belgium, reaching number two on the singles chart. The music video for "Green Light" was directed by Alan Ferguson. It features Legend and Benjamin pursuing women at a house party while including visual effects created by Baked FX. The song can be heard on Grand Theft Auto IV: Episodes From Liberty City on The Beat 102.7 radio station. The song was used to wake up the crew of Artemis II on day 2 of the mission.

== Background ==
"Green Light" was written by John Stephens, Andre Benjamin, Fin Greenall, James Ho and Rick Nowels and produced by Malay and KP. In an interview with British music publication Blues & Soul, Legend discussed the creation process to make the song. "Initially I was working in the studio with a guy called Rick Knowles, who’s not known for making a buncha dance songs but is a good writer! And one of the songs we worked on turned out to be ‘Green Light’. He started playing this guitar groove, put a beat to it... And, because it was uptempo and felt good, the melody and lyric came to me pretty quickly." Legend then showed the product to Kawan "KP" Prather, his A&R representative at the time, who then collaborated with Malay to re-produce the song.

After listening to the final product, they decided to enlist American rapper André 3000 Benjamin, saying "‘Cause it just sounded like something he’d do!" They sent it to Benjamin, who "loved it" and expressed interest in being featured on it, almost immediately writing and recording his rap. Legend commented that once he heard Benjamin on "Green Light", he stated "to me it straightaway felt like the album’s first single! It seemed like the kind of thing that would grab people’s attention, it sounded like a great record, and it felt like it would be a big hit... And to me it STILL feels like that!”" "Green Light" was released as the first single from Evolver (2008). The song was serviced to rhythmic and urban radios on August 19, 2008, through GOOD Music and Columbia Records. Through Columbia, the song was released for digital distribution on August 26, 2008.

== Composition ==
"Green Light" represents a departure from Legend's previous musical works. Nathan S. of DJ Booth noted that the song still uses the "same smooth vocals and spare melodies" present in his previous ballads. Musically, the song is an uptempo and light electro-funk club banger. The song utilizes horns, saxophone, trombone, trumpets, double time drum loops, synthesizers, computerized handclaps, and busy hip-hop beats. Andy Kellman of Allmusic noted that the synthesizers featured on the song are similar to those utilized in Paul McCartney's 1979 holiday single "Wonderful Christmastime" and Kanye West's 2007 single "Flashing Lights" (Graduation, 2007). Alex Macpherson of The Guardian said that the song's "skittery beats and swooning synths" are reminiscent of Kelis's 2004 single "Millionaire" (Tasty, 2003). Legend raises his vocals to the falsetto register on the song's hook. According to the digital music sheet published at Musicnotes.com by BMG Rights Management, the song is written in a key of G major. It has a moderately fast tempo of 150 beats per minute. Legend's vocals range from a low register of D_{3} to a high register of A_{4}.

== Response ==
=== Critical reception ===
Andy Kellman of AllMusic selected it as one of the album's top tracks, noting that it benefits from Andre 3000's "upstaging, off-the-cuff, don't-give-a-damn appearance" but criticized it for sounding like "increasingly bad fit with each play, full of simpleminded gestures." Ryan Ogle of ARTISTdirect called "Green Light" and "If You're Out There" "well-received and welcome" departures from his previous style of music. Mark Edward Nero of About.com wrote a positive review of the song, writing "If John Legend is selling out by looking for a pop hit, then selling out has rarely sounded so fun." In the review of Evolver for the same publication, Nero praised it as being "arguably his first bona fide club banger". DJ Z of DJ Booth called the pairing of John Legend and Andre 3000 "an absolute musical match", stating that it is "so harmonious, in fact, that it should have plenty of fans clamoring for an entire collaborative project." Christine Van Dusen of Paste Magazine said that the song was almost as good as "Used to Love U" (Get Lifted, 2004). Claire Allfree of Metro called "Green Light" an "effervescent dance-floor filler". Eric Henderson of Slant Magazine wrote that " Andre's near-apathetic wordplay on the former is hardly the way to fulfill the legacy of "Bombs Over Baghdad," nor is Kanye's "kiddies"/"titties" rhyming scheme on the latter going to get him into graduate school, but as guest spots on a John Legend album, they are the sonic equivalent of unclenching buttocks." Eric R. Danton of Sound Check welcomed the "dazzling, ebullient wordplay" presented by Andre 3000 on the track.

=== Chart performance ===
On September 20, 2008, almost a month after the single's release, "Green Light" debuted at number ninety-six on the Billboard Hot 100. On December 6, 2008, the song peaked at number twenty-four, tying with Legend's 2005 single "Ordinary People" (Get Lifted, 2004) as his highest peaking single on the chart at the time; "All of Me" ultimately peaked at number one in 2014. One week later, the song peaked at number four on the Billboard Hot Dance Club Songs. The song was certified platinum in the United States by the Recording Industry Association of America (RIAA) on February 25, 2010. The song has sold 1,247,000 copies in the U.S. as of June 2014.

In Canada, the single debuted on the Canadian Hot 100 at number 94 on August 16, 2008. Three weeks later, the song peaked at number eighty. In the United Kingdom, "Green Light" entered the singles chart at number ninety-five on September 27, 2008. On November 1, 2008, the song peaked at number thirty-five. "Green Light" debuted on the Belgium Singles Chart at number thirty on August 18, 2008. The song rose to its peak at number two on September 27, 2008, but fell off the chart the following week. In Italy, the song peaked on the singles chart at number nineteen on October 30, 2008.

== Music video ==
An accompanying music video was released on August 22, 2008 on FNMTV. André 3000 appears in the video along with Legend. Visual effects and editorial for the video were created by Baked FX, previously Baked Goods. The video starts with John Legend performing one of his previous hit songs, "Ordinary People". Afterwards, the video proceeds to a wild party. At the end of the video, a snippet from Legend's song "Good Morning", also on Evolver, is played during the morning after, while Legend and André 3000 leave the house and other party guests remain asleep.

English singer Estelle, who was signed to Legend's Homeschool Records, makes a cameo appearance in the video.

"The song is simple. It's just me trying to pick up a girl at a club and convince her to come have some fun with me. [The video] definitely has that story line in it, but we just take it kind of different places to do some unexpected visual things. We have this surreal kind of dance sequence, and it features synchronized swimmers and showgirls. We just throw a little extra twist on it. We wanted to mix a current, modern feel with an old-school, classic Hollywood feel because the song has kind of a big-band quality to it as well as a more modern dance-song quality. We wanted to mix the two different parts."

== Credits and personnel ==
Recording, mastering and mixing

- Recorded at Wine-O-Cellar in College Park, Georgia, Platinum Sound in New York City, New York, and PatchWerk Recording Studios in Atlanta, Georgia.
- Mastered at The Mastering Place in New York City, New York
- Mixed at Larrabee North Studios in North Hollywood, California.

Personnel

- Songwriting - Andre Benjamin, Fin Greenall, James Ho, John Stephens, Rick Nowels
- Production - KP, Malay
- Recording - Malay, Mike Wilson, Alonzo Vargas
- Recording assistant - Denny Ogle
- Mixing - Manny Marroquin
- Mixing assistant - Christian Plata
- Instruments - Malay
- Horns - Hornz Unlimited
- Saxophone - Kebbi Williams
- Trombone - Richard Owens
- Trumpets - Jason Freeman, Jerry Freeman
- Vocals - John Legend, Andre 3000

Credits taken from Evolver liner notes.

== Formats and track listings ==
UK CD

1. "Green Light" (International radio edit)
2. "Green Light" (Johnny Douglas radio edit)

UK Remixes Promo

1. Greenlight (Original) 4:49
2. Greenlight (Johnny Douglas Remix Club) 7:15
3. Greenlight (Johnny Douglas Remix) 5:00
4. Greenlight (Johnny Douglas Remix Radio Edit 3 Without Rap) 3:13
5. Greenlight (Johnny Douglas Instrumental) 4:58
6. Greenlight (Tom Neville Remix) 7:52
7. Greenlight (Tom Neville Dub) 6:38
8. Greenlight (Kings Of Tomorrow Remix) 7:26
9. Greenlight (Afroganic Remix) 4:13
10. Greenlight (Afroganic Instrumental) 4:04

UK Remixes Promo (2)

1. Greenlight (Johnny Douglas Remix Club) 7:15
2. Greenlight (Tom Neville Remix) 7:52
3. Greenlight (Sandy Rivera's KOT Remix) 7:26
4. Greenlight (Afroganic Instrumental) 4:04
5. Greenlight (Tom Neville Dub) 6:38
6. Greenlight (Johnny Douglas Radio Edit 1) 4:02

U.S. Dance Remixes Promo

1. Green Light (Slang Remix Radio Edit) 4:25
2. Green Light (Slang Remix) 6:05
3. Green Light (Karmatronic Radio Edit) 3:33
4. Green Light (Karmatronic Club Mix) 6:23
5. Green Light (MKL Radio Edit) 4:35
6. Green Light (MKL Remix) 6:47
7. Green Light (Diplo Mad Decent Remix) 3:51

== Charts ==
=== Weekly charts ===
Chart (2008–2009)	Peak position
Belgium (Ultratip Bubbling Under Flanders)	2
Belgium (Ultratip Bubbling Under Wallonia)	8
Canada Hot 100 (Billboard)	80
Italy (FIMI)	19
Germany (GfK)	52
Netherlands (Mega Single Top 100)	48
Switzerland (Schweizer Hitparade)	81
UK Singles (Official Charts)	35
US Billboard Hot 100	24
US Dance Club Songs (Billboard)	4
US Hot R&B/Hip-Hop Songs (Billboard)	6
US Pop Airplay (Billboard)	21

=== Year-end charts ===
Chart (2008)	Position
US Hot R&B/Hip-Hop Songs (Billboard)	83
Chart (2009)	Position
US Billboard Hot 100	92
US Hot R&B/Hip-Hop Songs (Billboard)	43

=== Certifications ===
Region	Certification	Certified units/sales
United States (RIAA)	2× Platinum	1,247,000
