= André 3000 =

American rapper (born 1975)

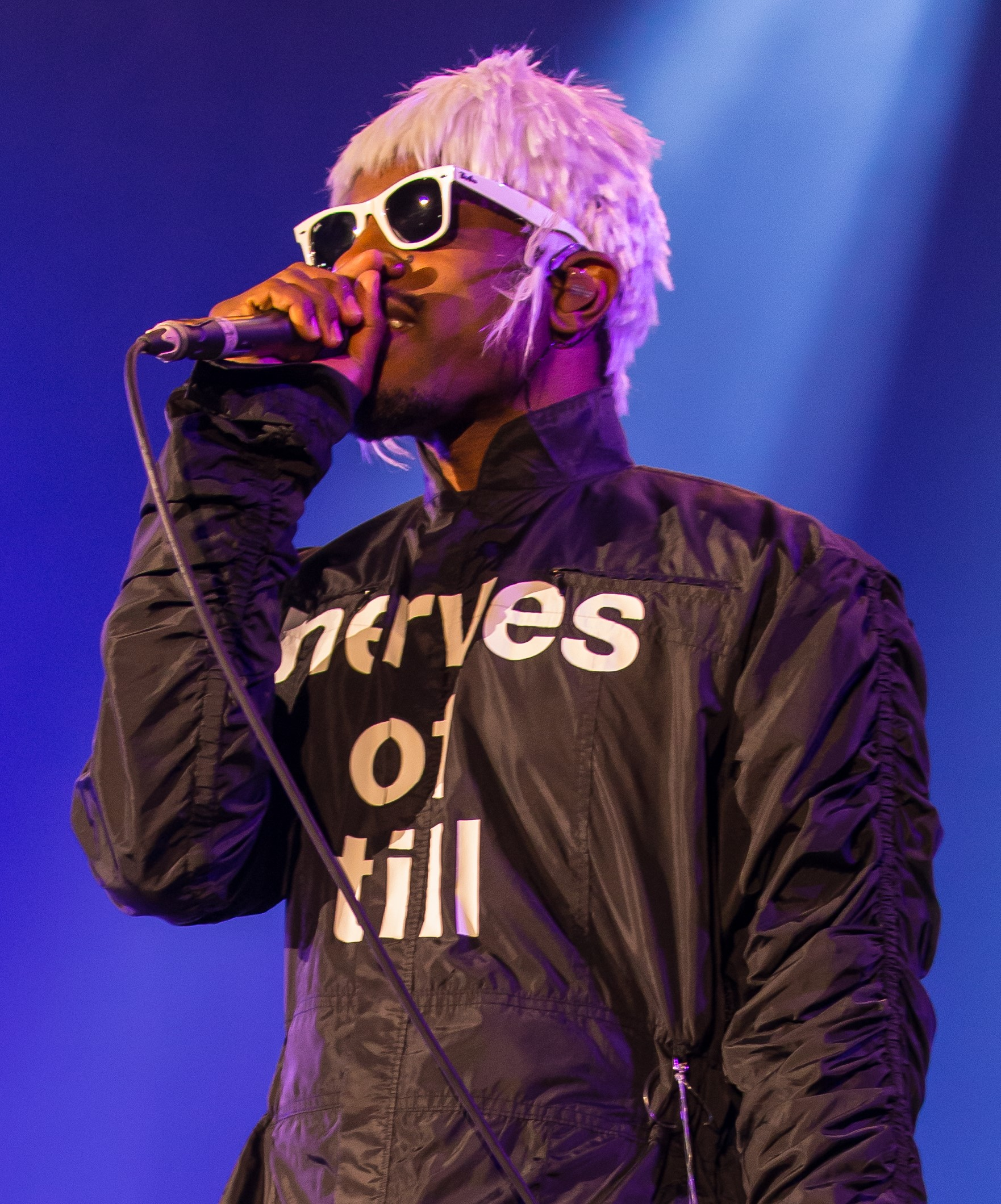
- André 3000 performing in 2014

Background information
- Also known as: Johnny Vulture; Black Wolf; 3 Stacks; Thank You Good Sir
- Born: André Lauren Benjamin; May 27, 1975 (age 51); Atlanta, Georgia, U.S.
- Genres: Southern hip-hop; R&B; progressive rap; funk; jazz; ambient
- Occupations: Rapper; singer; songwriter; record producer; actor
- Instruments: Vocals; guitar; flute; bass clarinet; keyboards
- Works: Discography; filmography; solo production
- Years active: 1992–present
- Labels: LaFace; Arista; Epic
- Formerly of: Outkast; Dungeon Family
- Partner: Erykah Badu (1995–1998)
- Children: 1
- Website: andre3000.com

André Lauren Benjamin (born May 27, 1975), known professionally as André 3000, is an American rapper, singer, record producer and actor. Born and raised in Atlanta, Georgia, he is one half of the hip-hop duo Outkast along with rapper Big Boi, which they formed in 1992. Often recognized for his early use of rap-singing, he is widely regarded as one of the greatest rappers of all time. In 2025, Benjamin was inducted into the Rock and Roll Hall of Fame as a member of Outkast.

As part of Outkast, the duo's six studio albums were each met with critical and commercial success, spawning hit singles including "Ms. Jackson", "Roses", "So Fresh, So Clean", and "Elevators (Me & You)", among others. Their fifth, a double album titled Speakerboxxx/The Love Below (2003), contained a solo single performed by Benjamin: "Hey Ya!", which peaked atop the Billboard Hot 100 and won Best Urban/Alternative Performance at the 46th Annual Grammy Awards. After the duo split in 2007, Benjamin became less active as a solo act compared to Big Boi, although he made several highly acclaimed guest appearances on releases by other artists; such activity has earned him an additional three Grammy Awards—from eight nominations—as a solo act. Benjamin signed with Epic Records to release his debut studio album, New Blue Sun (2023), an instrumental recording showcasing his performances on flute. It was nominated for the Album of the Year at the 67th Annual Grammy Awards, his first solo nomination and third overall in the category after Stankonia (2000) and Speakerboxxx/The Love Below with Outkast, the latter of which won the award.

Outside of music, Benjamin has acted in films and television series such as Families, The Shield, Be Cool, Revolver, Class of 3000, Semi-Pro, High Life, Four Brothers, and in the lead role of Jimi Hendrix in All Is by My Side. He played Fredwynn on the AMC series Dispatches from Elsewhere, and was featured in the 2022 adaptation of the Don DeLillo novel White Noise.

== Early life ==
André Lauren Benjamin was born in Atlanta, Georgia, on May 27, 1975, the only child of real estate agent Sharon Benjamin and collections agent Lawrence Harvey Walker. His single mother raised him in Atlanta, East Point, and Buckhead, where he attended Sarah Smith Elementary School, Sutton Middle School, Northside High School, McClarin Success Academy, and Tri-Cities High School.

At Sutton Middle School, Benjamin was a member of the Ritz Players, a drama club. It was in 7th grade that he first took the stage as an actor, portraying the character Avery in the club's performance of Charlotte's Web.

== Musical career ==
=== 1992–1998: Beginnings with Outkast ===
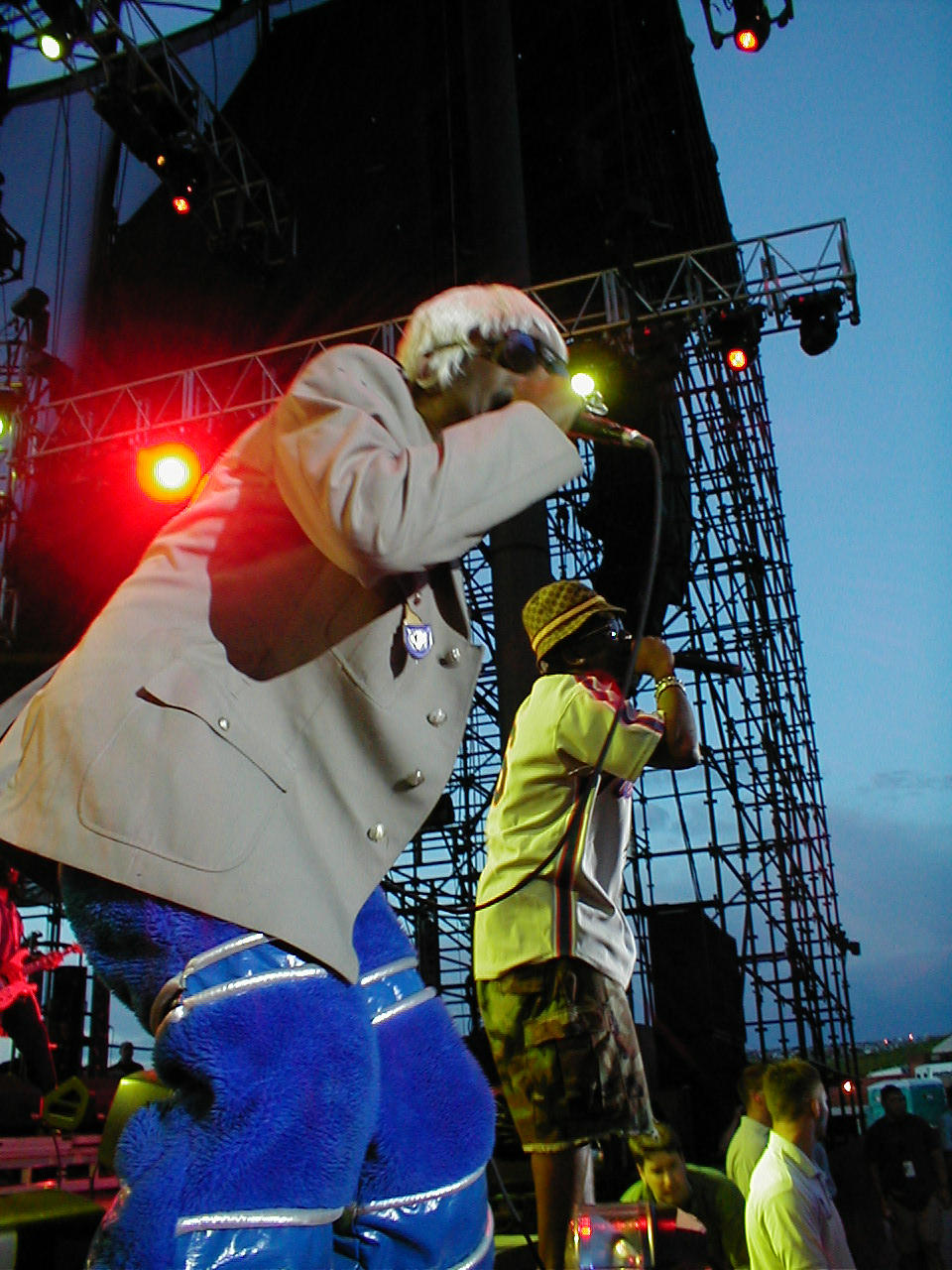
Outkast performing in 2001

In high school, Benjamin (who was then performing as Dré) met Antwan "Big Boi" Patton in 1992 at the Lenox Square shopping mall when they were both 16 years old. Benjamin and Patton, also attending the same high school, teamed up to form Outkast, named because the two had more unique tastes in fashion than their classmates. The duo was originally known as 2 Shades Deep, but changed it to Outkast because another local singing group was named 4 Shades Deep. Benjamin originally used the stage name of Black Wolf, inspired by blues musician Howlin' Wolf.

Shortly after graduating, Outkast was signed to the Atlanta-based record label LaFace and released their debut studio album, Southernplayalisticadillacmuzik, in 1994. Buoyed by the success of the single "Player's Ball" the previous year, the album was certified platinum by the RIAA the same year, and Outkast was named "Best New Rap Group of the Year" at the 1995 Source Awards. With the success of their debut album, LaFace gave them more creative control to conceptualize their second studio album, ATLiens (1996). The period marked a radical shift for Benjamin, in which after visiting Jamaica, he abandoned his cornrows in favor of a more natural look, adopted a more eccentric fashion sense, became a vegetarian, and stopped smoking marijuana. With the album releasing in August 1996, it embraced a laid-back, spacey production sound, climbing to number three on the Billboard 200 with more than 350,000 units in its first two weeks of release. The album gave them more recognition from East Coast hip-hop fans.

On their next two albums, ATLiens (1996) and Aquemini (1998), Outkast experimented with their sound by adding elements of trip hop, soul, and jungle. The albums were also influenced by a return to traditional black music genres, with funk being the most prominent example. Outkast's style and lyricism again received commercial and critical acclaim. With the duo's portrayal of themselves as out-of-place extraterrestrials in ATLiens, Benjamin's lyrics, in particular, were noted for their surreal, space-age tinge: "the funkadelic, futuristic, and seemingly unfamiliar, weird, or eccentric persona projected by André 3000 creates the chance to transcend the more pronounced characterizations of gangstas and pimps so regularly assumed by black men rap artists." During the recording of these albums, Benjamin took up guitar, painting, and a relationship with singer Erykah Badu.

=== 2000–2006: Mainstream expansion with OutKast ===
Outkast's fourth album, Stankonia (2000), introduced Benjamin's new alias André 3000 (largely to distinguish himself from Dr. Dre and to announce a new persona following his split with Badu) and increased the group's crossover appeal with the single "Ms. Jackson", which hit #1 on the Billboard Hot 100. The song was written in the aftermath of Benjamin's breakup with Badu and was a fictionalized account of the disintegration of their relationship. In 2002, Outkast released a greatest hits album, Big Boi and Dre Present... OutKast, which contained three new tracks, one of which, "The Whole World", won a Grammy for Best Rap Performance by a Duo or Group. Later that year, Benjamin participated in the Dungeon Family group album, which saw some prominent Atlanta-based hip-hop groups combine into a supergroup. In 2002, André 3000 was referenced on the song "Till I Collapse" by Eminem, who considered him one of the greatest rappers of all time.

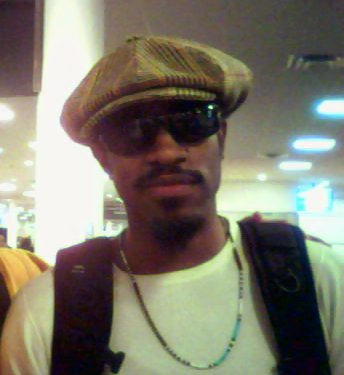
André 3000 in January 2006

In 2003 Outkast released Speakerboxxx/The Love Below, a double album that highlighted the differences in the musical styles of the group's two members. Though Big Boi's half of the album, Speakerboxxx, spawned the number-one hit "The Way You Move" and the relatively successful "Ghetto Musick", Benjamin's The Love Below garnered the most attention from mainstream audiences, with the popular singles "Hey Ya!" and "Roses" and their music videos receiving heavy radio and television airtime. "Prototype", the album's fourth single and video (Benjamin's third), was released shortly after. Unlike Speakerboxxx, The Love Below is an exercise in funk, jazz, and alternative music, featuring vocals from Benjamin which are mostly sung instead of rapped. Rolling Stone compared Benjamin to "an indie-rock Little Richard" on "Hey Ya!" and later declared the international hit one of The 500 Greatest Songs of All Time.

In 2006, Outkast released their sixth album as a group, Idlewild, which also served as a soundtrack to the group's musical film Idlewild. The film depicts life in a 1930s setting and the album takes influences from the music of that era, particularly blues. Benjamin had a few rapped verses on the album, including on the first single "Mighty O", but mostly stuck with singing, as he had on The Love Below. The album postponed the release of the theatrical film, as Benjamin and Patton were concentrated more on the production of the music than the movie. In an interview with Billboard in 2006, Benjamin explained that Outkast and its associates had developed the idea of creating a movie before the release of Aquemini, so that when it finally came time to collaborate on the movie, they already had most of the details worked out, including a script, and the movie was ultimately finished before the album was.

=== 2007–2011: Solo career ===
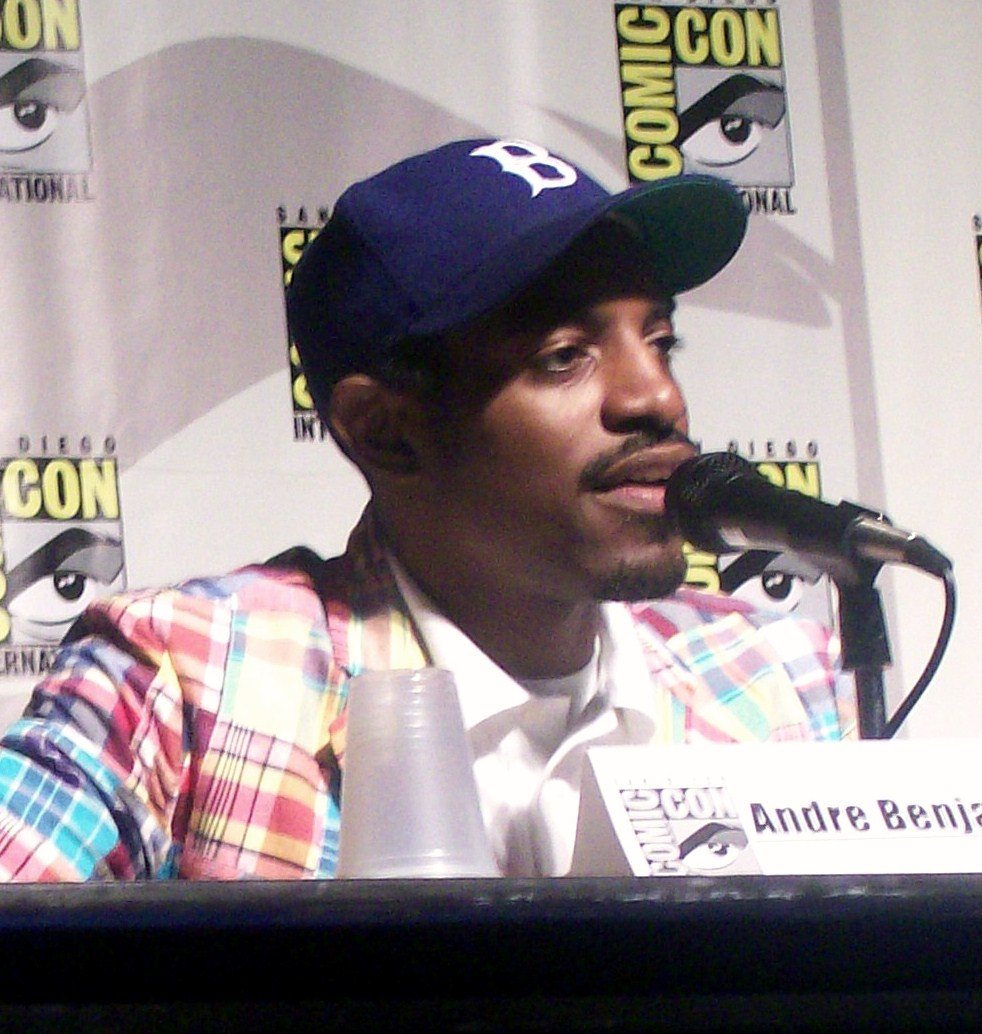
Benjamin at the 2007 San Diego Comic-Con

Benjamin returned to rapping in 2007, after a hiatus from the genre, appearing on various remixes including "Walk It Out", "Throw Some D's", "You", and Jay-Z's "30 Something". His contributions to original songs included UGK's "International Players Anthem", Devin the Dude's "What a Job", Fonzworth Bentley's "Everybody", and Big Boi's "Royal Flush" alongside Raekwon. Benjamin also worked with Q-Tip on the song "Be Brave", which was supposed to be released on Q-Tip's 2008 album The Renaissance. He also appeared on the track "Green Light" from John Legend's album Evolver, which was released on October 28, 2008. Prior to the release, Benjamin commented: "It's going to be a surprise for a lot of John Legend fans because it is a lot more upbeat than John is—than people think John is. I was actually happy to hear it. This is a cool John Legend song." Benjamin has stated that he plans on recording a solo rap album and that the response to his remixes is part of the motivation for it. In 2010, he was featured on Ciara's remix for her single "Ride" from the album Basic Instinct, and on the remix to Chris Brown's "Deuces".

On January 18, 2011, Kesha released "The Sleazy Remix", which featured Benjamin. The remix was later re-released on December 13, 2011, also featuring verses by rappers Lil Wayne, Wiz Khalifa, and T.I. On 6/7, Big Boi leaked a collaboration with Benjamin and Sleepy Brown entitled "Lookin' 4 Ya", which had originally been intended for Big Boi's debut solo album Sir Lucious Left Foot: The Son of Chico Dusty before it was blocked by Jive Records from appearing on the album.

On June 24, 2011, Beyoncé's fourth studio album, entitled 4, was released. Benjamin featured on the track "Party", his first collaboration with the singer. The song was later nominated for the Award for Best Rap/Sung Collaboration at the 2012 Grammy Awards. Benjamin continued his string of guest appearances throughout the year, featuring on Lloyd's song "Dedication to My Ex (Miss That)", Lil Wayne's "Interlude", and Drake's "The Real Her". He also featured on the track "Play the Guitar" by B.o.B.

=== 2011–2017: Further guest appearances ===
Benjamin was featured alongside Jay-Z on Young Jeezy's track "I Do", released on January 10, 2012. It later appeared on Young Jeezy's fourth studio album Thug Motivation 103: Hustlerz Ambition. Benjamin's verse, which was initially recorded as a song for his debut solo album, was leaked onto the Internet in 2010. The following month, it was announced that Benjamin would be featured on a song with LCD Soundsystem frontman James Murphy and the alternative rock virtual band Gorillaz titled "DoYaThing", in order to promote the Gorillaz Converse collection. It was released on February 23, 2012, in two different versions, an approximately 4-and-a-half-minute radio edit and an explicit 13-minute version. The song was written and recorded over three days, with the 13-minute version being recorded on the last one.

On July 10, 2012, Channel Orange, the debut album by singer-songwriter and Odd Future member Frank Ocean, was released. Benjamin was featured on the song "Pink Matter", supplying vocals and guitar. Also in July 2012, Rick Ross's album God Forgives, I Don't featured Benjamin on the song "Sixteen", once again supplying vocals and guitar. Later in the year, Benjamin also featured on T.I.'s album Trouble Man: Heavy Is the Head on the song "Sorry". T.I. noted that the collaboration was a "proud moment" for him. In May 2013, the soundtrack for the 2013 film The Great Gatsby was released, featuring a cover by Benjamin and Beyoncé of Amy Winehouse's "Back to Black", marking their second collaboration. The following month, Capital Cities released their debut album, In a Tidal Wave of Mystery, in which Benjamin was featured on the song "Farrah Fawcett Hair".

In August 2013, after being seen in the studio with producer Mike Will Made It, it was reported that Benjamin would be releasing a new solo album in early 2014. However, a representative for Benjamin told Billboard that "there is no official confirmation on that report." In January 2014, it was announced that Outkast would be reuniting to celebrate their twentieth anniversary by performing at more than forty festivals worldwide during the spring and summer of 2014, beginning with a headline spot at the Coachella Valley Music and Arts Festival in Indio, California in April. That year, Benjamin appeared on fellow Dungeon Family member Future's second studio album, Honest, on a song titled "Benz Friendz (Whatchutola)".

On November 27, 2015, Benjamin made a surprise guest appearance on the track "Hello" from Erykah Badu's mixtape, But You Caint Use My Phone. Benjamin would increase his output with multiple guest appearances in 2016, starting with a verse and background vocals on "30 Hours" from Kanye West's album, The Life of Pablo, on February 14. On August 20, Benjamin wrote and recorded a verse for "Solo (Reprise)" from Ocean's album, Blonde, where he shows his dissatisfaction with the state of the world and hip-hop. On September 2, Benjamin appeared on "The Ends" from Travis Scott's album, Birds in the Trap Sing McKnight. The former's verse details traumatic memories back from his childhood in Atlanta, referencing crimes committed by mass murderer Wayne Williams.

On September 30, Benjamin appeared on a remix of Divine Council's "Decemba" and Solange's "Junie" from her album, A Seat at the Table. The former details Benjamin's cinematic verse that collects tales of "sex, crime and chaos", and the latter highlights his falsetto to the chorus. On November 11, Benjamin appeared on "Kids..." from A Tribe Called Quest's album, We Got It from Here... Thank You 4 Your Service, and on December 16, was featured on "By Design" and "The Guide" from Kid Cudi's album, Passion, Pain & Demon Slayin'. Benjamin made his sole musical contribution in 2017 with a verse on "Rollinem 7's" from N.E.R.D's album, No One Ever Really Dies.

=== 2018–present: Increasing scarcity and solo projects ===
On May 13, 2018, on Mother's Day, Benjamin released two surprise songs through his SoundCloud account, "Me&My (To Bury Your Parents)" and a 17-minute instrumental track, "Look Ma No Hands", which featured Benjamin on bass clarinet and James Blake on piano. On June 8, Benjamin co-produced "Fire" for Kids See Ghosts, a duo consisting of rappers Kanye West and Kid Cudi. Benjamin later made two music appearances in 2019, collaborating with English musician James Blake on "Where's the Catch" from Assume Form on January 18, and with American musician Anderson .Paak on "Come Home" from Ventura on April 12. On November 13, 2020, Benjamin appeared on "No Cigar" from Goodie Mob's studio album, Survival Kit.

On September 3, 2021, as part of Drake's ongoing feud with Kanye West, the former leaked the West and Benjamin collaboration "Life of the Party" on his SiriusXM radio show. The unreleased track was originally intended to be on West's album Donda. Benjamin released a statement on the uncertified release explaining that the track was omitted from Donda due to West's current stance against profanity and remarked, "It's unfortunate that it was released in this way and two artists that I love are going back and forth." "Life of the Party" was released officially as part of a deluxe edition of Donda on November 14, 2021.

Benjamin has a supporting role in the 2022 film Showing Up, and according to director Kelly Reichardt, during production, Benjamin "was walking around playing his flute." That same year, he also appeared on the Everything, Everywhere, All at Once soundtrack playing the flute (credited as "André Benjamin"). According to Benjamin, his work on this soundtrack marked the first time he'd recorded his flute playing in a studio. On June 16, 2023, Benjamin collaborated with Killer Mike, Future, and Eryn Allen Kane on "Scientists & Engineers" from the former's studio album, Michael. The song went on to receive two Grammy awards for Best Rap Performance and Best Rap Song at the 66th Annual Grammy Awards the following year.

Benjamin's first solo studio album, New Blue Sun, which features his work as a flautist, was released on November 17, 2023. Later that month, a track from that album, "I Swear, I Really Wanted to Make a 'Rap' Album but This Is Literally the Way the Wind Blew Me This Time," became the lengthiest track to appear on the Billboard Hot 100 chart. The ambient flute-infused song is 12 minutes and 20 seconds long, beating out Tool's "Fear Inoculum," which previously held the title at 10 minutes and 21 seconds long. Benjamin and an accompanying ensemble performed music from New Blue Sun live on the final day of ATL JazzFest in Atlanta, Georgia in late May 2024, drawing a large crowd of local fans to the festival to hear the performance. The show was free and open to the public. A collaboration with Sault was also announced in early 2024. He appeared in three collaborations that year: "Birthworkers Magic, and How We Get Hear" with Carlos Niño on Placenta and "Dream State" with Kamasi Washington on Fearless Movement in May, "Infinite Palaces of Possibility/Horse" with Nate Mercereau on Excellent Traveler in October, and "To the Moon" with Shabaka on Possession in December.

On November 22, 2024, Benjamin released his second EP, Moving Day, as an anniversary celebration to New Blue Sun, consisting of three scrapped tracks from the latter's sessions. Earlier that week, he confirmed to Amazon Music that "new music for sure" was coming, searching new ways to "distribute and express" himself. On May 5, 2025, shortly after Benjamin's Met Gala appearance, he released his third EP, 7 Piano Sketches, consisting of improvised piano tracks recorded more than a decade before New Blue Sun. That year, OutKast were inducted into the Rock and Roll Hall of Fame, with Benjamin emotionally reflecting on the duo's history and crediting other hip-hop artists for inspiring them, including Busta Rhymes, Missy Elliott, Nas, Wu-Tang Clan, and Goodie Mob. Tyler, the Creator, Killer Mike, JID, Doja Cat, and Janelle Monáe performed renditions of OutKast's hits on stage, including "B.O.B. (Bombs Over Baghdad)", "Ms. Jackson", and "The Whole World".

== Artistry ==
Benjamin's early hip-hop influence was Rakim, who inspired him to rap at school talent shows as a teenager. He was also heavily influenced by A Tribe Called Quest, stating that group member Q-Tip is "kind of like the father of all of us, like me, Kanye, Pharrell".

In the book How to Rap, several emcees praised his rapping technique; k-os noted Benjamin's intricate songwriting process and "wicked" flow, Fredro Starr of Onyx commended Benjamin's ability to unpredictably "change up [his] flow on every record", and David Banner said that Benjamin is "one of the best lyricists ever" despite his Southern drawl delivery. With the release of Outkast's Speakerboxxx/The Love Below album, Billboard stated that Benjamin had proved himself to be "an eccentric emo crooner and one of hip-hop's elite at the same time". Henry Adaso of About.com noted that in Benjamin's solo career, he had developed "a reputation for stealing the show with nearly every guest appearance". He has been ranked as one of the greatest rappers of all time by several publications; Billboard ranked him sixth, The Source and About.com ranked him 13th, and Complex ranked him 10th best of the 2000s.

Benjamin began producing music on Outkast's ATLiens album, and later co-founded the production team Earthtone III, which also consisted of Big Boi and Mr. DJ. On Speakerboxxx/The Love Below, he evolved his production by playing multiple live instruments, including keyboards, guitar, acoustic guitar, and tenor saxophone. He has since contributed outside production for Aretha Franklin, Frank Ocean, and Kids See Ghosts, among others. Scarface has called Benjamin the "Prince Rogers Nelson of Hip-Hop".

== Acting career ==
Benjamin has made appearances in Families, The Shield (he plays Robert Huggins, a character that originated in an episode titled "On Tilt" from Season 3 in 2004), Be Cool, Revolver, Semi Pro, and Four Brothers. He was also cast as Percival in Outkast film Idlewild, released on August 25, 2006, alongside the album of the same name. He voiced a crow in Charlotte's Web, a 2006 movie adaptation of the 1952 children's book.

From 2006 to 2008, Benjamin voiced Sunny Bridges, a prize-winning musician who gives up touring to teach at his alma mater, in Class of 3000, an animated series on Cartoon Network which he also produced. He has also worked with Esthero on a promotional version of "Jungle Book" which was on a Wikked lil' grrrls sampler, but never made it to the actual album due to issues with Esthero's label, Warner Bros. The following year, Benjamin appeared in the basketball comedy Semi-Pro with Woody Harrelson and Will Ferrell. He also starred in Battle in Seattle, a 2007 film about the 1999 Seattle World Trade Organization protests.

Benjamin was a member of Quentin Tarantino and Lawrence Bender's production company A Band Apart until its close in 2006. Benjamin then formed his own company, Moxie Turtle. In May 2012, Benjamin began filming a biographical film about Jimi Hendrix entitled All Is By My Side. It premiered at the 2013 Toronto International Film Festival on September 7, 2013. His performance was met with critical acclaim and earned him a nomination for the Independent Spirit Award for Best Male Lead. In 2016, Benjamin had a recurring role as Michael LaCroix on the second season of the anthology crime drama series American Crime. In 2018, Benjamin starred in Claire Denis' first English-language film High Life.

Based on the documentary film The Institute about the alternate reality game in 2000s San Francisco called The Jejune Institute, Benjamin co-starred alongside Jason Segel in the 2020 AMC drama series Dispatches from Elsewhere as Fredwynn, an intelligent yet paranoid man dedicated to figuring out the truth.

== Fashion ==
Benjamin launched the "Benjamin Bixby" clothing line in the spring of 2008, which was inspired by college football from the mid-1930s. It was relaunched as Benji Bixby in 2025.

== Personal life ==
Benjamin was in a relationship with singer Erykah Badu from 1995 to 1998, and they had a son together named Seven Sirius Benjamin (b. November 18, 1997).

In 2004, alongside Alicia Silverstone, Benjamin was voted by People for the Ethical Treatment of Animals (PETA) as the "World's Sexiest Vegetarian Celebrity". He previously followed a vegan diet but stated in 2014, "I was a hardcore vegan for 15 years. I've even done raw. But socially it became horrible. I was kind of just sitting at home eating a salad. You become mean. That's not good for you."

Benjamin posed for a print advertising campaign by Declare Yourself, a campaign encouraging voter registration among youth for the 2008 United States presidential election. In the ads by photographer David LaChapelle, he had his mouth gagged by a bow-tie in a symbolic function.

In 2019, Benjamin shared that he was diagnosed a few years prior with social anxiety and hypersensitivity disorder.

== Discography ==
Studio album

- New Blue Sun (2023)

Extended plays

- Look Ma No Hands (2018)
- Moving Day (2024)
- 7 Piano Sketches (2025)

== Filmography ==
Films

Year	Film	Role	Notes
2002	Hip Hop Uncensored Vol. 3: Hustlemania	Himself	
2002	Uncovered: The Series-Outkast	Himself	
2003	Hollywood Homicide	Silk Brown	
2003	Soundz of Spirit	Himself	
2003	Volcano High	Kim Kyung-soo	MTV English dub
2004	The Industry	Himself	
2005	Be Cool	Dabu	
2005	Four Brothers	Jeremiah Mercer	
2005	Volcano High	Kim Yung Soo	Voice only
2005	Revolver	Avi	
2006	Idlewild	Percival	
2006	Charlotte's Web	Elwyn	Voice only
2006	Scary Movie 4	Jack	Uncredited
2007	Fracture	George	
2007	Battle in Seattle	Django	
2008	Semi-Pro	Clarence Withers/Coffee Black/Downtown "Funky Stuff" Malone/Sugar Dunkerton/"Jumping" Johnny Johnson	
2010	The After Party: The Last Party 3	Himself	
2012	Diary of a Decade: The Story of a Movement	Himself	
2013	Jimi: All Is by My Side	Jimi Hendrix	Nominated— Independent Spirit Award for Best Male Lead
2015	Dominique Belongs to Us	Narrator	
2016	The Art of Organized Noize	Himself	
2018	High Life	Tcherny	
2018	The André 3000 Documentary	Himself	
2021	Sign the Show: Deaf Culture, Access & Entertainment	Himself	
2022	Showing Up	Eric	
2022	White Noise	Elliot Lasher	

Television

Year	Show	Role	Notes
1995	Martin	Himself	Episode: "All the Players Came"
2004; 2008	The Shield	Robert Huggins	2 episodes, including series finale episode
2006–2008	Class of 3000	Sunny Bridges	Creator, 26 episodes
2016	American Crime	Michael LaCroix	Recurring
2016	Brad Neely's Harg Nallin' Sclopio Peepio	Himself/Senator Harvey	Episode: "For Aretha"
2020	Dispatches from Elsewhere	Fredwynn	Main role
2027	Scooby-Doo: Origins		

Video game

Year	Title	Role	Notes
2005	L.A. Rush	Himself	voice roles

== Awards and nominations ==
Grammy Awards

Year	Nominated work	Category	Result	Ref.
1999	"Rosa Parks"	Best Rap Performance By a Duo or Group	Nominated	
2002	"Ms. Jackson"	Best Rap Performance By a Duo or Group	Won	
2002	"Ms. Jackson"	Record of the Year	Nominated	
2002	"Ms. Jackson"	Best Short-Form Music Video	Nominated	
2002	Stankonia	Album of the Year	Nominated	
2002	Stankonia	Best Rap Album	Won	
2003	"The Whole World" (with Killer Mike)	Best Rap Performance By a Duo or Group	Won	
2004	"Hey Ya!"	Record of the Year	Nominated	
2004	"Hey Ya!"	Best Urban/Alternative Performance	Won	
2004	"Hey Ya!"	Best Short-Form Music Video	Nominated	
2004	OutKast	Producer of the Year, Non-Classical	Nominated	
2004	Speakerboxxx/The Love Below	Best Rap Album	Won	
2004	Speakerboxxx/The Love Below	Album of the Year	Won	
2006	Love. Angel. Music. Baby. (as producer)	Album of the Year	Nominated	
2007	"Idlewild Blue (Don't Chu Worry 'Bout Me)"	Best Urban/Alternative Performance	Nominated	
2007	"Mighty 'O'"	Best Rap Performance By a Duo or Group	Nominated	
2008	"International Player's Anthem (I Choose You)" (with UGK)	Best Rap Performance By a Duo or Group	Nominated	
2009	"Royal Flush" (with Big Boi & Raekwon)	Best Rap Performance By a Duo or Group	Nominated	
2009	"Green Light" (with John Legend)	Best Rap/Sung Collaboration	Nominated	
2012	"Party" (with Beyoncé)	Best Rap/Sung Collaboration	Nominated	
2013	"I Do" (with Young Jeezy, Drake & Jay-Z)	Best Rap Performance	Nominated	
2013	Channel Orange (as featured artist)	Album of the Year	Nominated	
2020	"Come Home" (with Anderson .Paak)	Best R&B Performance	Won	
2024	"Scientists & Engineers" (with Killer Mike, Future & Eryn Allen Kane)	Best Rap Performance	Won	
2024	"Scientists & Engineers" (with Killer Mike, Future & Eryn Allen Kane)	Best Rap Song	Won	
2025	New Blue Sun	Album of the Year	Nominated	
2025	New Blue Sun	Best Alternative Jazz Album	Nominated	
2025	"I Swear, I Really Wanted to Make a 'Rap' Album but This Is Literally the Way the Wind Blew Me This Time"	Best Instrumental Composition	Nominated	
