= Evolver (John Legend album) =

Studio album by John Legend
- Released: October 28, 2008
- Recorded: 2007–2008
- Studio: The Cutting Room Studios
- Length: 50:42
- Labels: GOOD; Columbia; Sony
- Producers: Kanye West; John Legend; Shannon Sanders; Drew Ramsey; Malay; KP; Frank Ocean; Dave Tozer; Midi Mafia; Dapo; will.i.am; Trevor Horn; Devo Springsteen; The Neptunes; Supa Dups; Teddy Riley; Ne-Yo

John Legend chronology
Once Again (2006)	Evolver (2008)	Wake Up! (2010)

Singles from Evolver
- 1. "Green Light" Released: July 29, 2008; 2. "If You're Out There" Released: August 24, 2008; 3. "Everybody Knows" Released: March 23, 2009; 4. "This Time" Released: May 25, 2009

Evolver is the third studio album by American singer John Legend, released by GOOD Music and Sony Music Entertainment on October 28, 2008, in the United States and on October 20 in the United Kingdom. It features guest appearances by Kanye West, Brandy, Estelle and Andre 3000, among others.

The album debuted at number 4 on the U.S. Billboard 200 with sales of 132,823 copies. It also entered the UK Albums Chart at number 21, and reached number 26 on the national Japanese albums chart, as well as number 5 on the Japanese foreign chart. The album received positive reviews from music critics. Since the album's release, it has been certified Gold by the RIAA.

In May 2009, the song "This Time" was featured prominently in the closing scenes of the third-season finale of the CW/BET comedy-drama television series The Game.

== Background ==
Speaking in July 2008 to noted UK R&B writer Pete Lewis of Blues & Soul, Legend explained what he wanted to achieve musically with Evolver: "I wanted it to be diverse. So I basically just wanted to make some great records that together covered the whole gamut of the various forms of expression I feel comfortable doing. So we have a couple of club tracks; we have a reggae song; we have a few really strong ballads... and kind of everything in between. Plus we have a political anthem at the end as well. So, while there are some elements that people have heard in previous albums of mine, I also think there are some things people HAVEN'T heard from me before. And I think that's what makes the album interesting. In particular I feel I've made different arrangement and production choices this time. While I don't think my writing style itself has changed significantly, sonically the main difference is that we chose to use more electronic instruments on this record."

== Reception ==
Professional ratings
Aggregate scores
Source	Rating
Metacritic	67/100
Review scores
Source	Rating
About.com	3.5/5 stars
AllMusic	2/5 stars
Entertainment Weekly	B+
Los Angeles Times	3/4 stars
Paste	8/10 (Van Dusen); 3/10 (Fink)
PopMatters	7/10 stars
Robert Christgau	(dud)
Rolling Stone	3.5/5 stars
The Times	2/5 stars
USA Today	3/4 stars

The album so far has a score of 67 out of 100 from Metacritic based on "generally favorable reviews". The Independent gave it four stars out of five and said that the album was "not perfect... but it would be churlish not to praise its ability and ambition." Yahoo! Music UK gave it eight stars out of ten and said that "Once Again remains Legend's best record. But Evolver, in all its modernity and timeliness, may well become his biggest." Now likewise gave it four stars out of five and stated that the album, "like everything else Legend has done, showcases his skill as an artist, but it lacks the passion that would help him reach the Stevie Wonder status he strives for." The A.V. Club gave the album a B and said, "Smooth to a fault, Evolver solidifies Legend's standing in the pantheon of good soul singers, but greatness continues to elude him."

Billboard gave it a positive review and said that "Legend's voice remains beyond reproach, but for a guy who's an oasis of style and soul in a sea of synthetic, robo-call R&B, at times it seems like he's playing catch-up." The New York Times likewise gave it a positive review and stated: "With reverberations and a choral backdrop straight out of Seal, it's his only overreach. Mr. Legend is more charming one-on-one." The Village Voice also gave it a favorable review and stated: "As the dying industry is still breathing in the toxins of useless filler, patrons like John Legend are fully indulging their creativity in all its flawed glory, just like the soul giants of yesteryear." AllHipHop likewise gave it a positive review and stated: "Even if Evolver is less cohesive due to the integration of the Pop sound to the alternative styles [Legend] played around with in Once Again, it still is light years ahead of any artist mimicking his suave persona." The Boston Globe similarly gave it a positive review and stated that, "As the title suggests, Legend is a work-in-progress, and this stage in his evolution is worth hearing." Hartford Courant likewise gave it a positive review and said that the album "delivers what it promises: A singer, songwriter and musician pushing himself to grow. This is a good first step."

Other reviews are average, mixed or negative: Mojo gave the album a score of three stars out of five and called it "a good album, but there's a pull between the commercial and the more left-field." Q also gave it three stars out of five and said that the album was "more in the same gold-standard, singer-songwriterly vein." Spin gave it a score of six out of ten and said, "Though he's unlikely to encounter much trouble selling these romantic conceits to his female-heavy fan base, some of the scenarios on John Legend's third studio album could be fresher." The Guardian likewise gave it three stars out of five and said, "As on Legend's previous two efforts, his balladry can tend towards the beige, and oatmeal slow jams such as 'Cross the Line' prove unmemorable; but the innate warmth of Legend's voice mostly carries his material." Slant Magazine also gave it three stars out of five and said, "For a change, Legend doesn't constantly sound as though he's trying to impress the VH1 cognoscenti with his impeccable musicality. Sure, that's to say it's occasionally dumb, but oh so approachable." Hot Press gave it the same score of three out of five and said, "Legend manages to capture the optimistic spirit of Barack Obama in addition to his mastery of soul, pop and hip-hop". Blender, however, gave the album two stars out of five and called it "the least accomplished of [Legend's] albums" but "nonetheless a refreshing change of sorts, for all its faults, at least as far as missteps are concerned."

== Track listing ==
No.	Title	Writer(s)	Producer(s)	Length
1.	"Good Morning (Intro)"	Drew Ramsey; Britton Newbill; John Stephens; Shannon Sanders	John Legend	0:46
2.	"Green Light" (featuring André 3000)	Andre Benjamin; Fin Greenall; James Ho; Stephens; Rick Nowels	Malay; KP	4:44
3.	"It's Over" (featuring Kanye West)	West; Pharrell Williams	Malay; KP; West^{[a]}	4:27
4.	"Everybody Knows"	Ho; Stephens; Kawan Prather; Terrence Smith	Malay; KP	4:35
5.	"Quickly" (featuring Brandy)	Christopher Breaux; Dapo Torimiro; Stephens; Kevin Risto; Waynne Nugent	Midi Mafia; Torimiro; Frank Ocean	3:42
6.	"Cross the Line"	Stephens; Prather; William Adams	will.i.am	3:22
7.	"No Other Love" (featuring Estelle)	Dwayne Chin-Quee; Estelle Swaray; Stephens; Mitchum "Khan" Chin	Supa Dups; Chin^{[a]}	3:59
8.	"This Time"	Dave Tozer; Stephens; Prather	Tozer; Trevor Horn	4:23
9.	"Satisfaction"	Christine Teigen; Stephens; Adams	will.i.am	4:45
10.	"Take Me Away"	Reggie Perry; Shaffer Smith	Syience; Ne-Yo^{[a]}	3:03
11.	"Good Morning"	Ramsey; Newbill; Stephens; Sanders	Drew and Shannon; Legend	4:01
12.	"I Love, You Love"	Stephens; Mark Knopfler; Adams	will.i.am	4:35
13.	"If You're Out There"	Devon Harris; Stephens; Prather; Marcus John Bryant	Horn; Devo Springsteen; Bryant^{[a]}	4:20

iTunes bonus tracks
No.	Title	Writer(s)	Producer(s)	Length
14.	"Floating Away"	Chuck Harmony; Stephens; Smitht	Harmony; Ne-Yo^{[a]}	4:15
15.	"Set Me Free"	Greenall; Stephens; Nowels	Nowels	3:55
16.	"Green Light" (Afroganic Mix)	Benjamin; Greenall; Ho; Stephens; Nowels	Malay; KP; Afroganic^{[b]}	4:11

Europe and Brazil bonus tracks
No.	Title	Writer(s)	Producer(s)	Length
14.	"Can't Be My Lover" (featuring Buju Banton)	Chin-Quee; Stephens; Mark Myrie; Chin	Supa Dups; Chin^{[a]}	4:34
15.	"It's Over" (Teddy Riley Remix)	West; Williams	Malay; KP; West^{[a]}; Teddy Riley^{[b]}	4:20

Japan tour edition bonus tracks
No.	Title	Writer(s)	Producer(s)	Length
14.	"Floating Away"	Harmony; Stephens; Smith	Harmony; Ne-Yo^{[a]}	4:15
15.	"Set Me Free"	Greenall; Stephens; Nowels	Nowels	3:55
16.	"It's Over" (Teddy Riley Remix)	West; Williams	Malay; KP; West^{[a]}; Riley^{[b]}	4:20
17.	"Can't Be My Lover" (featuring Buju Banton)	Chin-Quee; Stephens; Myrie; Chin	Supa Dups; Chin^{[a]}	4:34
18.	"Pride (In the Name of Love)"	Adam Clayton; Larry Mullen; Dave Evans; Paul David Hewson	Legend; Joel Beckerman	4:08

Brazil re-release bonus tracks
No.	Title	Writer(s)	Producer(s)	Length
14.	"Can't Be My Lover" (featuring Buju Banton)	Chin-Quee; Stephens; Myrie; Chin	Supa Dups; Chin^{[a]}	4:34
15.	"Green Light" (Johnny Douglas Radio Edit)	Benjamin; Greenall; Ho; Stephens; Nowels	Malay; KP; Johnny Douglas^{[b]}	3:24
16.	"No Importa" (featuring Noel Schajris)			4:07
17.	"Entreolhares (The Way You're Looking At Me)" (featuring Ana Carolina)			3:15

Notes

- ^{^[a]} signifies co-producer
- ^{^[b]} signifies additional producer

== Personnel ==
Taken from Discogs and Billboard.

- Executive Producer - John Legend, Kanye West
- A&R - Kawan Prather
- A&R Operations - Juli Knapp
- Photographer *Cover, Inner Tray, Page 5 - Vincent Peters
- Photographer *All other photos - Nabil Elderkin
- Marketing - Quincy S. Jackson
- Management - The Artists Organization

== Charts ==
=== Weekly charts ===
Chart (2008)	Peak position
Australian Albums (ARIA)	66
Belgian Albums (Ultratop Flanders)	37
Belgian Albums (Ultratop Wallonia)	82
Canadian Albums (Billboard)	14
Dutch Albums (Album Top 100)	7
French Albums (SNEP)	72
German Albums (Offizielle Top 100)	86
Irish Albums (IRMA)	52
Italian Albums (FIMI)	19
Swedish Albums (Sverigetopplistan)	38
Swiss Albums (Schweizer Hitparade)	36
UK Albums (Official Charts)	21
US Billboard 200	4
US Top R&B/Hip-Hop Albums (Billboard)	1

=== Year-end charts ===
Chart (2008)	Position
Dutch Albums (Album Top 100)	65
US Billboard 200	157
US Top R&B/Hip-Hop Albums (Billboard)	57

Chart (2009)	Position
Dutch Albums (Album Top 100)	96
US Billboard 200	86
US Top R&B/Hip-Hop Albums (Billboard)	31

== Certifications ==
Region	Certification	Certified units/sales
Netherlands (NVPI)	Gold	30,000^{^}
United Kingdom (BPI)	Silver	60,000^{*}
United States (RIAA)	Platinum	603,000
^{*} Sales figures based on certification alone.^{^} Shipments figures based on certification alone.
