= Royal Flush (song) =

Single by Big Boi featuring André 3000 and Raekwon
- Released: March 24, 2008
- Recorded: 2007
- Genre: Hip hop
- Length: 3:17
- Label: Purple Ribbon; LaFace; Jive
- Songwriters: Antwan Patton; André Benjamin; Corey Woods; Jeron Ward; Ricky Walker; Earle Hagen; Ronald Isley; Ernie Isley; Marvin Isley; O'Kelly Isley Jr.; Rudolph Isley; Chris Jasper
- Producer: The Flush

Big Boi singles chronology
"Hood Boy" (2006)	"Royal Flush" (2008)	"Sumthin's Gotta Give" (2008)

André 3000 singles chronology
"Millionaire" (2004)	"Royal Flush" (2008)	"Green Light" (2008)

"Royal Flush" is the debut solo single by American rapper and OutKast member Big Boi. The track was released on March 24, 2008 and it features fellow OutKast member André 3000 as well as Wu-Tang Clan member Raekwon. It was the first time the three rappers collaborated with each other in 10 years since "Skew It on the Bar-B" off of OutKast's third album Aquemini in 1998. The song was intended to be included as part of Big Boi's debut solo album Sir Lucious Left Foot: The Son of Chico Dusty, but was removed from it, due to legal complications from Big Boi resigning from Jive Records.

This song contains sampled elements from the song "Voyage to Atlantis" by the Isley Brothers between each verse. Big Boi refers to this when at the end of his verse he says, "take a voyage to Atlantis".

The song was nominated for Best Rap Performance by a Duo or Group at the 51st Grammy Awards.

== Charts ==
Chart (2008)	Peak position
US Hot R&B/Hip-Hop Songs (Billboard)	68
