= Carlos Niño =

American musician, DJ, and poet (born 1972)

- Born: Carlos Gabriel Niño; February 16, 1977 (age 49)
- Origin: Santa Monica, California, U.S.
- Occupations: Record producer; disc jockey; composer
- Instrument: Percussion
- Years active: 1995–present
- Labels: All Saints; Alpha Pup; Anandamide; Eastern Developments; Disk Union; International Anthem; Kindred Spirits; Leaving; Ninja Tune; Plant Bass; Plug Research; P-Vine; Ring; Soul Jazz; Stones Throw; Tokonoma; Warp
- Website: carlosnino.bandcamp.com

Carlos Gabriel Niño (born February 16, 1977) is an American record producer, DJ, and music consultant. In 2023, he co-produced André 3000's debut studio album, New Blue Sun (2023).

== Radio ==
Niño volunteered as a junior reporter and producer at KPFK 90.7 FM in Los Angeles in the summer of 1994. In October 1995, he started his first radio show at the station called "All At One Point". "All At One Point" played on Wednesdays from 20:00 to 22:00 and was focused on "hip-hop, soul, jazz, and world rhythms." While hosting the show, Niño played his favorite contemporary artists; he featured live-in-studio performances and interviews with both established and up-and-coming artists, bands, and DJs. DJ Organic, Hymnl, and Jon Liu all co-hosted the show with him at different times between 1995 and 1998.

In October 1999, after a six-month hiatus (following the birth of his son), Niño returned to KPFK with a new sound and vision: "Spaceways Radio". On this program, he explored psychedelic, electronic, folk, new age, and world music genres. He created specials dedicated to individual artists and bands, phases of the Zodiac, and years past. The last "Spaceways Radio" broadcast was on March 22, 2015.

Niño was the host and DJ of other music programs on KPFK at the same time that "All At One Point" and "Spaceways" aired, including "Saturdays" and "Rise". He is a founding and contributing DJ/producer of Dublab Internet Radio Station. He was a monthly contributor to David Lynch's Transcendental Radio and Scion Radio, and he has made several mixes for the BBC and Red Bull Music Academy Radio.

== Carlos Niño & Friends ==
"Carlos Niño & Friends" is a collaborative, on-going project that Niño has been focused on since 2008 as a recording artist and producer. In the 2017 Bandcamp article by Will Schube, Niño says:

"The '& Friends' concept is really about me doing whatever I want creatively, with whoever I want. Just really freeing it up. These are the people I'm closest with personally. They're literally my closest friends. They're on the record because of that, and because they're among my favorite musicians and people to collaborate with."

== Discography ==
=== Carlos Niño & Friends ===
- High With A Little Help From (Plug Research US / Kindred Spirits EU 2009)
- Aquariusssssss (Porter, 2012)
- Aurorasmushroomtenderness (self-released, 2014)
- Flutes, Echoes, It's All Happening! (Leaving, 2016)
- Going Home (Leaving, 2017)
- Live At The World Stage (Leaving, 2018)
- Bliss On Dear Oneness (Leaving, 2019)
- Actual Presence (self-released via Bandcamp, 2020)
- More Energy Fields, Current (International Anthem, 2021)
- Extra Presence (International Anthem, 2022)
- (I'm just) Chillin', on Fire (International Anthem, 2023)
- Placenta (International Anthem, 2024)'
- Saul Williams meets Carlos Niño & Friends at TreePeople (International Anthem, 2025)
- Bubble Bath for Giants (self-released, 2026)

=== With Miguel Atwood-Ferguson ===
- Chicago Waves (International Anthem, 2020) – with Miguel Atwood-Ferguson
- Chicago Waves Remixes (International Anthem, 2020) – Four remixes made with music originally composed and recorded by Niño and Atwood-Ferguson for Chicago Waves

=== Other music projects ===
- Ammoncontact – co-founder, producer, artist
- Build An Ark – founder, producer, band leader
- Carlos Niño & Friends – producer, artist
- Raindiance / You're Suspended with Sam Gendel – producer, co-mixer, percussion
- Die Cut by Cut Chemist – associate producer
- Dexter Story
  - Seasons – co-producer
  - Wondem – co-producer
  - Bahir – co-producer
- Horace by Dwight Trible – co-producer
- Gaby Hernandez
  - When Love – co-producer, co-composer
  - Spirit Reflection – co-producer, co-composer
- Go: Organic Orchestra – co-producer, promoter
- Hu Vibrational – co-founder, producer
- Black Space Tapes by Jamael Dean – co-producer, co-mixer, percussion
- Jamael Dean & The AfroNauts – percussion
- Bring on the Sun and Sun Gong by Laraaji – co-producer, co-mixer
- The Life Force Trio – founder, co-producer, co-composer
  - Love is the Answer by Dwight Trible & the Life Force Trio (2005) – co-producer, co-composer
  - Living Room (2006)
- The Masses – composer, DJ
- GEA by Mia Doi Todd – co-producer
- The Miguel Atwood-Ferguson Ensemble – percussion
- Nate Mercereau Sundays – co-producer, musician
- Nate Mercereau & Carlos Niño – co-producer, artist
- Photay with Carlos Niño – co-producer, artist
- Rainbow Revisited – producer, artist
- The Sound of L.A. – co-executive producer, project coordinator
- Spaceways Radio Collage – producer, artist
- Spaceways Radio Remix – producer
- Turn On The Sunlight – co-founder, co-producer, artist
- What's The Science? – co-founder, producer, artist
- André 3000
  - New Blue Sun – co-producer, musician
