= New Blue Sun =

Studio album by André 3000
- Released: November 17, 2023
- Studios: Shangri-La, Malibu, California
- Genres: Ambient; new-age; spiritual jazz
- Length: 87:41
- Label: Epic
- Producers: André 3000; Carlos Niño

André 3000 chronology
Look Ma No Hands (2018)	New Blue Sun (2023)	Moving Day (2024)

New Blue Sun is the debut solo studio album by American musician André 3000. It was released by Epic Records on November 17, 2023, representing an end to his 17-year hiatus from new material.

The album was produced by André 3000 and Carlos Niño and features instrumental contributions by an ensemble, including André 3000 (flutes), Niño (percussion), Nate Mercereau (guitars), Deantoni Parks (drums), V.C.R. (violin), Surya Botofasina and Diego Gaeta (keyboards), Matthewdavid (mycelial electronics), Jesse Peterson (multi-instruments), and Mia Doi Todd (vocals). New Blue Sun received positive reviews from music critics and was nominated for Album of the Year and Best Alternative Jazz Album at the 67th Annual Grammy Awards, and the opening track, "I Swear, I Really Wanted to Make a 'Rap' Album but This Is Literally the Way the Wind Blew Me This Time", was nominated for Best Instrumental Composition.

== Background ==
In a previous endeavor with a woodwind instrument, André 3000 collaborated with James Blake in 2018 to release a 17-minute long instrumental jazz song called "Look Ma No Hands"; the former played bass clarinet on the track.

In the years leading up to the release of New Blue Sun, André 3000 made media appearances playing flute in public settings; this was especially amplified online by his appearance as a flautist on the score for the Daniels' 2022 film Everything Everywhere All at Once. He would later meet with jazz musician Carlos Niño in Los Angeles, where the two agreed to create a studio album. The song "Tunnels of Egypt" was made during New Blue Sun's recording sessions, but was left off the album and later released on November 22, 2024. Ahead of New Blue Sun's announcement, fellow rapper Killer Mike teased an impending release by André 3000.

As his first solo studio release, and the first studio material of his in a significant period of time, the 87-minute album largely consists of "experimental flute music" with both acoustic and electronic instrumentation, influenced by spiritual jazz musicians and minimalist composers. It features "a myriad" of different flutes performed by André 3000 in various styles across eight instrumental pieces.

When announcing the album on November 14, 2023, André 3000 emphasized that the project is not "a rap record", with the packaging displaying a lighthearted disclaimer that it contains "no bars"; he has additionally dismissed rumors that he was "sitting around on rap albums" that he has been characterized as refusing to release, saying instead that he felt more comfortable with the direction indicated by New Blue Sun.

The album was originally titled Everything Is Too Loud, but was renamed because André 3000 felt that it put out negative energy.

== Critical reception ==
Professional ratings
Aggregate scores
Source	Rating
AnyDecentMusic?	7.2/10
Metacritic	77/100
Review scores
Source	Rating
AllMusic	3.5/5 stars
Clash	6/10
Evening Standard	2/5 stars
HipHopDX	4.1/5
MusicOMH	3/5 stars
The Observer	3/5 stars
Paste	8.3/10
Pitchfork	8.3/10
Spill	4/5 stars
The Times	4/5 stars

New Blue Sun was met with generally positive reviews. At Metacritic, which assigns a normalized rating out of 100 to reviews from professional publications, the album received an average score of 77, based on ten reviews.

Reviewing the album for Pitchfork, Sadie Sartini Garner described it as an "87-minute devotional to new age, ambient jazz, and spiritual discovery. It's beautiful, demanding, and among the most fascinating artistic left turns in recent memory". Clash's Robin Murray called it "relaxing, occasionally absorbing, and often explicitly beautiful" and an album that "hinges on André's love for melody and his questing spirit".

Fred Thomas of AllMusic wrote that "if you can get past the premise (and overlook the goofy song titles, most of which are too long and silly to dignify here) and tune in to New Blue Sun as an album of contemplative healing sounds, it's pleasant and sometimes even sublime". David Smyth of the Evening Standard asked "Is this really how he's going to reintroduce himself to the music world?" and wrote that it "feels like music from the time when your record shop had a 'New Age' section", calling its songs "long, and peaceful, and deliberately unfocused".

New Blue Sun appeared on year-end lists from Pitchfork and Consequence, who respectively rated it the 50th and 47th best album of 2023.

== Track listing ==
All tracks are written by André Benjamin and Carlos Niño, with additional co-writers as noted.

New Blue Sun track listing
No.	Title	Music	Length
1.	"I Swear, I Really Wanted to Make a 'Rap' Album but This Is Literally the Way the Wind Blew Me This Time"	Nate Mercereau; Surya Botofasina	12:20
2.	"The Slang Word P(*)ssy Rolls Off the Tongue with Far Better Ease Than the Proper Word Vagina. Do You Agree?"	Mercereau; Botofasina	13:50
3.	"That Night in Hawaii When I Turned into a Panther and Started Making These Low Register Purring Tones That I Couldn't Control ... Sh¥t Was Wild"	Deantoni Parks; Mercereau	10:29
4.	"BuyPoloDisorder's Daughter Wears a 3000® Shirt Embroidered"	Mercereau; Botofasina	13:05
5.	"Ninety Three 'Til Infinity and Beyoncé"	Diego Gaeta; Matthewdavid; Shabaka Hutchings; V.C.R	3:49
6.	"Ghandi, Dalai Lama, Your Lord & Savior J.C. / Bundy, Jeffrey Dahmer, and John Wayne Gacy"	Gaeta; Jesse Peterson; Mia Doi Todd	10:15
7.	"Ants to You, Gods to Who?"	Gaeta; Peterson; Todd	6:42
8.	"Dreams Once Buried Beneath the Dungeon Floor Slowly Sprout into Undying Gardens"	Mercereau; Botofasina	17:11
Total length:			87:41

== Personnel ==
Credits are adapted from the liner notes of New Blue Sun.

Musicians

- Carlos Niño – bells, chimes, cymbals, drums, gong, plants, percussion
- Nate Mercereau – guitar, guitar synth, live sampling (1–4, 8)
- Surya Botofasina – keyboards, synthesizer (1, 2, 4, 8)
- André 3000 – wind controller (1, 2, 5–8), pedals (3–5), contrabass flute (3), "panther toning" (3), flute (4, 5)
- Deantoni Parks – drums (3)
- Diego Gaeta – keyboards, synthesizer (5); piano (6, 7)
- Matthewdavid – mycelial electronics (5)
- Shabaka Hutchings – Shakuhachi (5)
- V.C.R – violin, effects (5)
- Jesse Peterson – bass, sintir, pedals (6, 7)
- Mia Doi Todd – vocals (6, 7)

Technical

- André 3000 – production, mixing
- Carlos Niño – production, mixing
- Ken Oriole – mixing, engineering, recording
- Andy Kravitz – mastering
- Fab Dupont – additional production

== Charts ==
Chart performance for New Blue Sun
Chart (2023–2024)	Peak position
German Albums (Offizielle Top 100)	55
Swiss Albums (Schweizer Hitparade)	50
UK Album Downloads (Official Charts)	7
UK Record Store (OCC)	17
US Billboard 200	34
US New Age Albums (Billboard)	1
US Top Rock & Alternative Albums (Billboard)	8
