= Goodie Mob discography =

The discography of American hip hop group Goodie Mob consists of six studio albums, one compilation and nine singles.

== Albums ==
=== Studio albums ===
Year	Title	Chart positions			Certifications
Year	Title	US	US R&B/HH	CAN	Certifications
1995	Soul Food: Released: November 7, 1995; Label: LaFace; Formats: CD, LP, cassette, digital download	45	8	67	RIAA: Gold
1998	Still Standing: Released: April 7, 1998; Label: LaFace; Formats: CD, LP, cassette, digital download	6	2	81	RIAA: Gold
1999	World Party: Released: December 21, 1999; Label: LaFace; Formats: CD, LP, cassette, digital download	48	8	—	RIAA: Gold
2004	One Monkey Don't Stop No Show: Released: June 29, 2004; Label: Koch; Formats: CD, LP, digital download	85	15	—	
2013	Age Against the Machine: Released: August 27, 2013; Label: The Right Records, Primary Wave, Atlantic; Formats: CD, digital download	30	9	—	
2020	Survival Kit: Released: November 13, 2020; Label: Organized Noize, Goodie Mob Worldwide; Formats: digital download	—	—	—	

=== Compilations ===
Year	Title	Chart positions
Year	Title	US R&B
2003	Dirty South Classics: Released: December 16, 2003; Label: LaFace/Arista; Formats: CD, LP (promo), digital download	100

== Singles ==
Year	Song	Chart positions			Album
Year	Song	US	US R&B/HH	US Rap	Album
1995	"Cell Therapy"	39	17	1	Soul Food
1996	"Soul Food" (featuring Sleepy Brown)	64	31	7	Soul Food
1996	"Dirty South" (featuring Cool Breeze and Big Boi of Outkast)	92	53	8	Soul Food
1998	"They Don't Dance No Mo'" ^{A}	-	53	-	Still Standing
1998	"Black Ice (Sky High)" (featuring Outkast)	50	48	13	Still Standing
1999	"Get Rich to This" (featuring Big Boi and Backbone)	-	65	-	World Party
2000	"What It Ain't (Ghetto Enuff)" (featuring TLC)	-	103	-	World Party
2004	"Play Your Flutes" (featuring Kurupt and Sleepy Brown)	-	-	-	One Monkey Don't Stop No Show
2004	"One Monkey"	-	-	-	One Monkey Don't Stop No Show
2012	"Fight to Win"	-	-	-	Age Against the Machine
2020	"Frontline"	-	-	-	Survival Kit

== Other appearances ==
Song	Year	Artist(s)	Album
Git Up, Git Out	1994	Outkast	Southernplayalisticadillacmuzik
Remember What I Said	1996	—N/a	Fled (soundtrack)
Blood	1996	Big Rube	America Is Dying Slowly
Angelic Wars	1996	Cool Breeze, Backbone	Set It Off (soundtrack)
"Decisions, Decisions"	1997	DJ Muggs	The Soul Assassins, Chapter I
The World I Know (Country Livin' Version)	1998	Esthero	Slam (soundtrack)
"Backyard Mississippi"	1998	8ball	Lost
Watch for the Hook	1999	Cool Breeze, Outkast	East Point's Greatest Hit
Where We Wanna	1999	C-Murder	Bossalinie
Hat Low	1999	—N/a	The PJs (soundtrack)
Sole Sunday	2000	Outkast	Any Given Sunday (soundtrack)
This Some'n Too	2000	DJ Muggs	Soul Assassins II
Just a Song	2000	—N/a	Bamboozled (soundtrack)
On & On & On; 6 Minutes (Dungeon Family It's On); White Gutz; Excalibur	2001	Dungeon Family	Even in Darkness
Hate Ourselves	2003	Bone Crusher	AttenCHUN!
Hold On	2005	—N/a	Got Purp? Vol. 2

^{A} Did not chart on the Hot 100 or Hot R&B/Hip-Hop charts (Billboard rules at the time prevented album cuts from charting). Chart peak listed here represents Hot 100 Airplay and Hot R&B/Hip-Hop Airplay charts data.
