= Livin' Life as Lumberjacks =

Studio album by Lumberjacks
- Released: January 25, 2005
- Genre: Southern hip hop
- Length: 56:11
- Label: Koch Records
- Producer: T-Mo (exec.); Khujo (also exec.); Organized Noize; Darin "Superpower" Baker; Hall Of Tunez; Edward Cleveland; Cool Rah; Ed X; Montez Harris; DJ Speedy

Lumberjacks chronology
One Monkey Don't Stop No Show (2004)	Livin' Life as Lumberjacks (2005)	A.T.L. 2 (A-Town Legends 2) (2008)

Professional ratings
Review scores
Source	Rating
AllMusic	4/5 stars
RapReviews	7/10

The Goodie Mob Presents: Livin' Life as Lumberjacks is the only studio album by American hip hop duo the Lumberjacks, composed of Goodie Mob members Khujo and T-Mo. It was released on January 25, 2005, via Koch Records. Production was handled by Organized Noize, Darin "Superpower" Baker, Hall Of Tunez, Edward Cleveland, Cool Rah, Ed X, Khujo, Montez Harris, DJ Speedy. It features guest appearances from Witchdoctor, Big Gipp, Big Hustle and Preacher.

After Cee-Lo and Big Gipp decided to leave Goodie Mob, T-Mo and Khujo released this album. Despite leaving Goodie Mob, Big Gipp is featured on two tracks. This album also marks the tenth anniversary of when the entire Goodie Mob released their first album Soul Food in 1995.

== Track listing ==
No.	Title	Producer(s)	Length
1.	"Murder Madness Music"	Organized Noize	4:32
2.	"Black History"	Sleepy Brown	3:46
3.	"Gothic Funk"	Organized Noize	4:25
4.	"Turn Your Whip" (featuring Big Hustle)	Darin "Superpower" Baker	4:27
5.	"Puttin' On 2nite"	Hall Of Tunez	3:42
6.	"Git High" (featuring Preacher and Witchdoctor)	Edward Cleveland	5:43
7.	"Bet Dat"	Cool Rah	3:23
8.	"They Comin' Man"	Organized Noize	4:30
9.	"Superfriends" (featuring Big Gipp)	Organized Noize	3:30
10.	"Hillbillies" (featuring Witchdoctor)	Ed X	4:32
11.	"Lock N Load" (featuring Witchdoctor)	Khujo	3:35
12.	"Probly Never"	Montez Harris	3:33
13.	"24/7/365" (featuring Big Gipp)	DJ Speedy	4:04
Total length:			56:11
