= A S.W.A.T. Healin' Ritual =

...A S.W.A.T. Healin' Ritual

Studio album by Witchdoctor
- Released: April 21, 1998
- Recorded: 1996–1997
- Studios: Purple Dragon Studios (Atlanta, GA); PatchWerk Recording Studios (Atlanta, GA); Doppler Studios (Atlanta, GA); DARP Studios (Atlanta, GA); Southern Tracks
- Genre: Hip-hop
- Length: 1:00:39
- Labels: Organized Noize; Interscope
- Producers: Junior Kinsey; Mr. DJ; Organized Noize; Rob & Emperor Searcy; Witchdoctor

Witchdoctor chronology
| ...A S.W.A.T. Healin' Ritual (1998) | 9th Wonder of the World (2000) |

Singles from ...A S.W.A.T. Healin' Ritual
- 1. "Holiday" Released: August 19, 1997

...A S.W.A.T. Healin' Ritual is the debut studio album by American rapper Witchdoctor. It was released on April 21, 1998, via Organized Noize/Interscope Records. The recording sessions took place at Purple Dragon Recording Studio, PatchWerk Recording Studios, Doppler Recording Studio, DARP Recording Studio and Southern Tracks in Atlanta. The production was handled by Organized Noize, Rob & Emperor Searcy, Junior Kinsey, Mr. DJ, and Witchdoctor himself. It features guest appearances from Goodie Mob, Big Rube, Cool Breeze, Heroine, Mook B., Outkast and Phoenix. The album debuted at number 157 on the Billboard 200, number 37 on the Top R&B/Hip-Hop Albums and number 7 on the Heatseekers Albums in the United States. Its single "Holiday" was also included in Bulworth: The Soundtrack. A music video for "Holiday" was co-directed by Stephanie Black and Malik Sayeed.

== Critical reception ==
Professional ratings
Review scores
| Source | Rating |
|---|---|
| AllMusic | 3/5 stars |
| Robert Christgau | (dud) |
| The Source | 3.5/5 stars |
| USA Today | 3/4 stars |

USA Today wrote that Witchdoctor "blends a heavy dose of spirituality into his hard-core rhymes and sends them bubbling over the searing funk laid down by producers Organized Noize."

== Track listing ==
| No. | Title | Writer(s) | Producer(s) | Length |
|---|---|---|---|---|
| 1. | "7th Floor/The Serengetti" (featuring CeeLo Green) | Erin Johnson; Thomas Callaway; Organized Noize | Organized Noize | 5:28 |
| 2. | "Holiday/12 Scanner" | Johnson; Robert McDowell; Dwayne Searcy; William Butler; Jerry Butler | Rob & Emperor Searcy | 4:48 |
| 3. | "A.T.L. the Great Big Lick" (featuring Mook B.) | Johnson; Dennis Butler; Organized Noize | Organized Noize | 4:12 |
| 4. | "Island Koneelalee" | Johnson; McDowell; Searcy; Kenneth Gamble; Leon Huff; Cary Gilbert | Rob & Emperor Searcy | 3:56 |
| 5. | "Georgia Plains (Holy Grounds)" (featuring Cool Breeze) | Johnson; Frederick Bell; Organized Noize; James Vanleer; Emmett Ellis Jr. | Organized Noize | 3:22 |
| 6. | "Remedy" (featuring Big Rube) | Ruben Bailey; Organized Noize | Organized Noize | 1:35 |
| 7. | "Hurtin'" | Johnson; Organized Noize | Organized Noize | 3:02 |
| 8. | "D.F." | | Organized Noize | 0:45 |
| 9. | "Heaven Comin'" (featuring Heroine) | Johnson; David Sheats; Organized Noize | Mr. DJ | 4:06 |
| 10. | "4 In the Temple" (featuring Big Gipp, Phoenix and T-Mo) | Johnson; Cameron Gipp; Kevin Burton; Robert Barnett; Organized Noize | Organized Noize | 4:57 |
| 11. | "Spells" | Johnson; Organized Noize; Kay Gardner; Patrick Patterson; Steve Scipio; Mike Rose; Pablo Gonsales; Sam Kelly; Derek Gibbs | Organized Noize | 1:43 |
| 12. | "Smooth Shit" (featuring Lumberjacks) | Johnson; Willie Knighton; Barnett; Organized Noize | Organized Noize | 4:56 |
| 13. | "The Ancient Sahore" | Johnson; Organized Noize | Organized Noize | 5:20 |
| 14. | "Dez Only 1" (featuring Outkast) | Johnson; André Benjamin; Antwan Patton; Organized Noize | Organized Noize | 4:13 |
| 15. | "The Ritual" | Johnson; Organized Noize | Organized Noize | 4:25 |
| 16. | "Lil Mama's Gone" | Johnson; Junior Kinsey | Junior Kinsey; Witchdoctor | 3:47 |
| Total length: | | | | 1:00:39 |

Sample credits

- Track 2 contains an interpolation of "I Stand Accused" written by William E. Butler and Jerry Butler.
- Track 4 contains elements from "Don't Leave Me This Way" written by Kenneth Gamble, Leon Huff and Cary Gilbert as performed by Thelma Houston.
- Track 5 contains replayed elements of "I've Been Watching You" written by James Vanleer and Bobby Rush.
- Track 11 contains elements from "Where The Heart Is" written and performed by Kay Gardener and replayed elements from "Promised Heights" written by Patrick Patterson, Steve Scipio, Mike Rose, Pablo Gonsales, Sam Kelly and Derek Gibbs.

== Personnel ==
- Erin "Witchdoctor" Johnson – vocals (tracks: 1–5, 7, 9, 10, 12–16), producer (track 16)
- Thomas "CeeLo Green" Callaway – vocals (track 1)
- Dennis "Mook B" Butler – vocals (track 3)
- Frederick "Cool Breeze/Freddie Calhoun" Bell – vocals (track 5)
- Ruben "Big Rube" Bailey – vocals (track 6)
- Joi Gilliam – vocals (track 9)
- Daddy Q – vocals (track 9), backing vocals (track 15)
- Whild Peach – vocals (track 9)
- Cameron Gipp – vocals (track 10)
- Kevin "Phoenix" Burton – vocals (track 10)
- Robert "T-Mo" Barnett – vocals (tracks: 10, 12)
- Kevin Sipp – spoken word (track 11)
- Willie "Khujo" Knighton – vocals (track 12)
- Collier Starks – backing vocals (track 13)
- Mark Starks – backing vocals (track 13)
- Andre "André 3000" Benjamin – vocals (track 14)
- Antwan "Big Boi" Patton – vocals (track 14)
- Debra Killings – backing vocals (track 14)
- Wallstreet – backing vocals (track 14)
- Euneika Rogers – interview voice, creative director
- Stephanie Solomon – news flash voice
- Marvin "Chanz" Parkman – Moog bass synthesizer (track 1), keyboards (track 6), bass (tracks: 7, 14, 15), Nord synthesizer (track 7), Rhodes electric piano (tracks: 9, 12), organ (track 9)
- David Whild – guitar (track 3)
- LaMarquis Jefferson – bass (track 4)
- Preston Crump – bass (tracks: 5, 12)
- Donny Mathis – guitar (track 6)
- Tomi Martin – guitar (track 9)
- Spencer Brewer – cello (track 9)
- Félix Ferrer – violin (track 9)
- Kerren Berz – violin (track 9)
- Larry Flanagan – viola (track 9)
- Regi Hargis – guitar (track 12)
- Martin Terry – guitar (track 12), acoustic guitar (track 14)
- Shawn Grove – acoustic guitar (track 14), recording engineering (tracks: 1, 5, 10, 12, 14)
- Junior Kinsey – guitar & producer (track 16)
- Organized Noize – drum programming (tracks: 1, 3, 5–7, 9, 10, 12–15), programming (track 11), mixing, producers (tracks: 1, 3, 5–8, 10–15), executive producers
- Robert "R.O.B." McDowell – drum programming (tracks: 2, 4), producer & mixing (tracks: 2, 4)
- Dwayne "Emperor" Searcy – drum programming (track 2), producer & mixing (tracks: 2, 4)
- David "Mr. DJ" Sheats – drum and keyboard programming & producer (track 9)
- Dean Paul Gant – orchestral arrangement (track 9)
- Mike Wilson – recording engineering (tracks: 1, 4, 7, 10, 12, 16), recording engineering assistant (track 3)
- Vincent Marshel – recording engineering assistant (tracks: 1, 5), recording engineering (track 14)
- Josh Butler – recording engineering (tracks: 2, 4, 16)
- Kevin Parker – recording engineering (tracks: 3, 7, 9, 12, 15)
- Kenneth Stallworth – recording engineering assistant (tracks: 3, 5, 6, 9, 11–13, 15)
- Blake Eiseman – recording engineering (tracks: 5–7, 11–14)
- Ryan Williams – recording engineering (track 9), mixing engineering assistant (tracks: 3, 5, 7, 9)
- Dexter Simmons – mixing & engineering (tracks: 1–5, 7, 10, 12, 14)
- Neal H Pogue – mixing & engineering (tracks: 6, 9, 11, 13, 15, 16)
- Eric Greedy – mixing engineering assistant (track 1)
- Alex Lowe – mixing engineering assistant (tracks: 2, 4, 15)
- Ty Shelton – mixing engineering assistant (tracks: 6, 11, 12, 13, 14)
- Tsumoru Kume – mixing engineering assistant (track 10)
- Ricciano "Ricco" Lumpkins – mixing engineering assistant (track 16)
- Herb Powers – mastering
- Matthew Welch – art direction, design photography
- Scott Denton-Cardew – design
- Paul McMenamin – additional design
- Tashion Macon – creative director
- Ramon Campbell – A&R

== Charts ==
| Chart (1998) | Peak position |
|---|---|
| US Billboard 200 | 157 |
| US Top R&B Albums (Billboard) | 37 |
| US Heatseekers Albums (Billboard) | 7 |
