= Mutant Mindframe =

Studio album by Big Gipp
- Released: August 12, 2003
- Studios: Silent Sound Studios (Atlanta, GA); Patchwork Studios; Speedy's House
- Genre: Hip-hop
- Length: 73:13
- Labels: Goodie Mob; In the Paint; Koch
- Producers: Big Gipp (exec.); DJ Speedy; Rondal Rucker; André 3000; Beer Wead X; Brandon Peters; JB; Jelly Roll; Montez Harris; Rashad Smith; Ray Murray

Big Gipp chronology
Mutant Mindframe (2003)	Kinfolk (2007)

Professional ratings
Review scores
Source	Rating
AllMusic	3/5 stars
HipHopDX	3.5/5
RapReviews	6/10
The New Rolling Stone Album Guide	3/5 stars

Mutant Mindframe is the debut solo studio album by American rapper Big Gipp. It was released in August 12, 2003 through Koch Records. It features guest appearances from Gator Boy, 8Ball, André 3000, Big Rube, Lumberjacks, Sleepy Brown, Slimm Calhoun and Witchdoctor. The album peaked at number 161 on the Billboard 200 albums chart in the United States.

== Track listing ==
No.	Title	Length
1.	"Intro (I Know the Pain)"	4:18
2.	"Make the People Say"	4:36
3.	"Choppin Through the Night" (featuring Gator)	4:08
4.	"You Buck, We Buck" (featuring Gator)	4:12
5.	"Steppin Out" (featuring Sleepy Brown)	4:34
6.	"WildOUT" (featuring Slimm Calhoun)	3:57
7.	"Boogie Man" (featuring André 3000)	2:59
8.	"All Over Your Body" (featuring 8Ball)	4:31
9.	"Strange"	3:20
10.	"3 Wordz"	4:16
11.	"Let's Fight" (featuring Khujo and T-Mo)	4:19
12.	"These Times"	5:15
13.	"Creeks" (featuring Witchdoctor)	4:14
14.	"History Mystery"	3:57
15.	"Zone Three" (featuring Big Rube)	5:57
16.	"Make It Happen"	4:36
17.	"Outro"	4:04
Total length:		73:13

== Charts ==
Chart (2003)	Peak position
US Billboard 200	161
US Heatseekers Albums (Billboard)	7
US Independent Albums (Billboard)	7
US Top R&B/Hip-Hop Albums (Billboard)	20
