= The Man Not the Dawg =

The Man Not The Dawg

Studio album by Khujo Goodie
- Released: November 5, 2002
- Recorded: 2001–2002
- Genre: Hip hop
- Length: 54:06
- Label: A To Z
- Producer: Arlinda Garrett (exec.); Khujo (also exec.); Chris and Scott; Ed X; Frank Nitti; Mark Twayne; Whild Peach

Khujo Goodie chronology
The Man Not The Dawg (2002)	G-Level (2007)

The Man Not The Dawg is the debut solo studio album by American rapper Khujo Goodie. It was released on November 5, 2002, via A To Z Records. Production was handled by Mark Twain, Frank Nitti, Chris and Scott, Whild Peach, and Ed X, with Arlinda Garrett and Khujo serving as executive producers. It features guest appearances from Mark Twayne, Whild Peach, Goodie Mob, Lil' Will, Mr. Murder, Slip Matola, South West Armstrong and Witchdoctor. The album peaked at number 96 on the US Billboard Top R&B/Hip-Hop Albums chart.

== Track listing ==
No.	Title	Writer(s)	Producer(s)	Length
1.	"Intro: Khujo Goodie the Man Not the Dawg..."	Willie Knighton		1:44
2.	"Off Dah R.I.P." (featuring S. W. Armstrong and Mark Twain)	W. Knighton; M. Knighton; Harold Willis	Mark Twain	4:41
3.	"How We Ride in Dah South" (featuring Goodie Mob and Mr. Murder)	W. Knighton; Cameron Gipp; Robert Barnett; M. Walker	Frank Nitti	5:30
4.	"Bendin' Cornas" (featuring Slip Matola and Mark Twain)	W. Knighton; Slip Matola; Willis	Mark Twain	4:19
5.	"Uallreadiekno"	W. Knighton	Mark Twain	4:14
6.	"Lumbah Jaxalipse"	W. Knighton	Chris and Scott (STR Studios)	4:10
7.	"Zone-III" (featuring Lil' Will)	W. Knighton	W. Knighton	3:46
8.	"Ten Commandment"	YWHW		2:00
9.	"Pimpz and Hoez" (featuring Whild Peach)	W. Knighton	Whild Peach	4:35
10.	"Tell It"	W. Knighton	W. Knighton	4:26
11.	"How Long"			1:22
12.	"Shawtly" (featuring Whild Peach)	W. Knighton	Whild Peach	5:29
13.	"It's Goin' Down" (featuring Witchdoctor)	W. Knighton	Ed X (Strong House)	6:06
14.	Untitled			1:44
Total length:				54:06

== Charts ==
Chart (2002)	Peak position
US Top R&B/Hip-Hop Albums (Billboard)	96
