= Aquemini =

Studio album by Outkast
- Released: September 29, 1998
- Recorded: 1996–1998
- Studios: Bearth Writers Music Group (Nashville); BossTown Studios (Atlanta); Doppler Studios (Atlanta)
- Genres: Hip hop; alternative hip-hop; G-funk
- Length: 74:47
- Labels: LaFace; Arista
- Producers: Organized Noize; Outkast; Mr. DJ

Outkast chronology
ATLiens (1996)	Aquemini (1998)	Stankonia (2000)

Singles from Aquemini
- 1. "Skew It on the Bar-B" Released: August 23, 1998; 2. "Rosa Parks" Released: March 23, 1999; 3. "Da Art of Storytellin' (Pt. 1)" Released: May 25, 1999

Aquemini (/əˈkwɛmɪˌnaɪ/) is the third studio album by the American hip hop duo Outkast, released on September 29, 1998, by LaFace Records and Arista Records. The title is a portmanteau of the two performers' Zodiac signs: Aquarius (Big Boi) and Gemini (André 3000), which is indicative of the album's recurring theme of the differing personalities of the two members. The group recorded the majority of the album in Bobby Brown's Bosstown Recording Studios and Doppler Studios, both in Atlanta, Georgia.

Released as the follow-up to the duo's commercially successful 1996 album ATLiens, Aquemini expands on the previous record's outer space-inspired compositions by incorporating live instrumentation and drawing on 1970s funk, southern soul, gospel, country, psychedelic rock, and other influences. The album reflected a greater level of creative freedom for the group, which led to the members self-producing the majority of the tracks and employing a large number of session musicians who filtered in and out of the studio throughout its recording, exerting a major influence on the album's compositional development. Featured guest artists include Raekwon, George Clinton, and Erykah Badu. Lyrically, Aquemini explores various subjects including individuality, human nature, addiction, self-inflicted struggles, technology, and interpersonal relationships, as well as blending science fiction concepts and urban narratives.

Aquemini received widespread critical acclaim from music critics, who praised the album's musicality, eclectic sound, and unique lyrical themes. Like its predecessor, it was a commercial success, peaking at No. 2 on both the Billboard 200 and the Top R&B/Hip-Hop Albums chart. The album was certified platinum in November 1998, only two months after its release, and was certified double platinum on July 2, 1999, by the Recording Industry Association of America (RIAA). Four of the album's tracks were released as singles, although some were limited promotional releases and not available commercially. Since its initial release, Aquemini has gone on to be considered one of the greatest hip hop albums ever made, as well as one of the greatest albums of all time. In 2003, Rolling Stone ranked the album number 500 on its list of the "500 Greatest Albums of All Time". In a 2020 updated list, it was moved up to number 49.

== Background ==
In 1994, Outkast released their debut album, Southernplayalisticadillacmuzik, which was recorded when the rappers Big Boi and André 3000 were 18. Bolstered by the success of "Player's Ball", the record established Outkast as prominent figures in the Southern hip hop scene. After the album was certified platinum, LaFace Records gave Outkast more creative control and advanced money for their 1996 follow-up album ATLiens. On ATLiens, André 3000 and Big Boi abandoned the "hard-partying playa characters" of their debut album in favor of personas that were more futuristic, and produced many of the songs on their own for the first time. Critics praised the group's maturing musical style on the record, which debuted at number two on the US Billboard 200 chart and sold nearly 350,000 copies in its first 2 weeks of release. The single "Elevators (Me & You)" reached number 12 and spent 20 weeks on the Billboard Hot 100 chart.

After the release of ATLiens, André 3000 entered a relationship with the neo soul singer Erykah Badu, who was part of a burgeoning movement in the urban music scene described as "more bohemian than ghetto". André 3000 adopted a more flamboyant style of dress during performances in promotion of ATLiens that included large glasses, blond wigs, and marching band uniforms. Badu gave birth to his first child in November 1997, which presented new artistic inspiration for the rapper.

== Recording ==
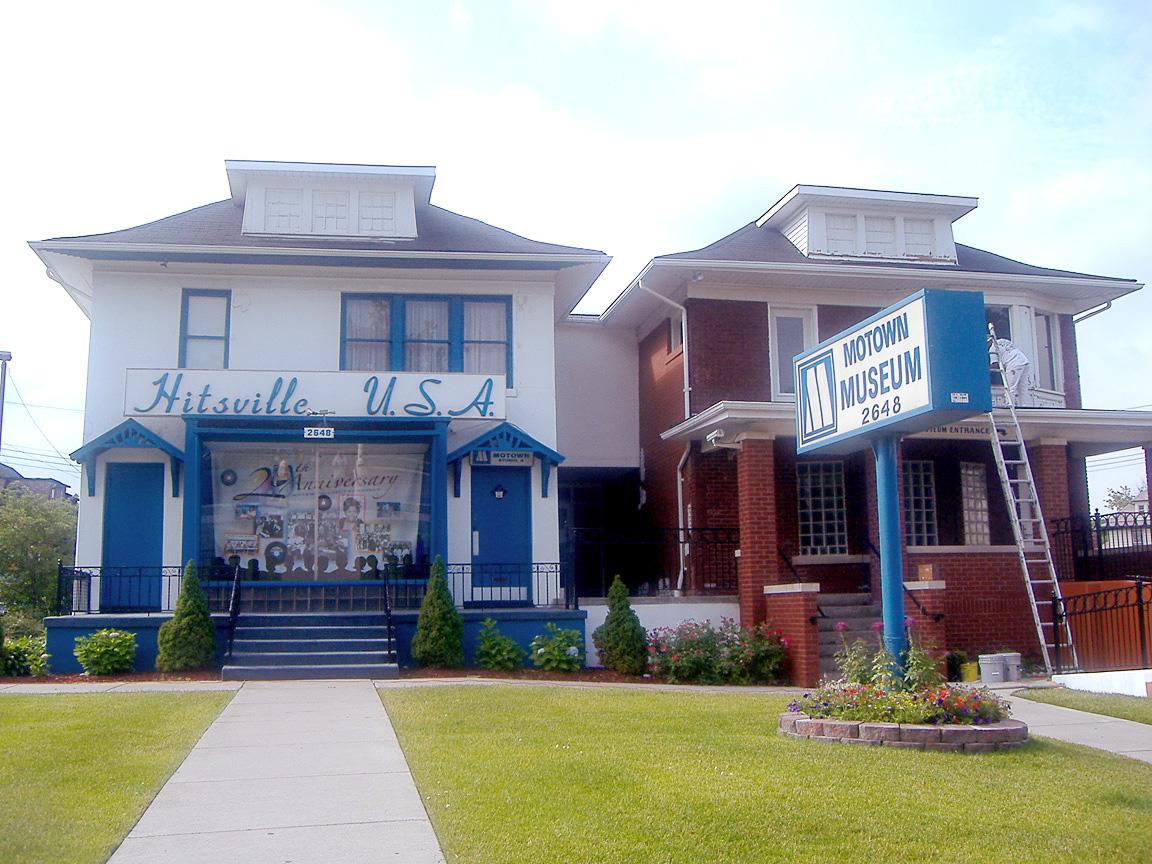
Producer Neal H. Pogue compared the recording of Aquemini, with its wide variety of live musicians, to that of 1960s Motown Records (former headquarters pictured).

Due to OutKast's newfound commercial success and higher budget for the album, the group enjoyed a more relaxed schedule and "could really just live" at the studio. The duo and studio musicians lived and worked in the studio for weeks straight, with Big Boi noting, "It usually takes us two to three years to make a record because we take our time; we ain't giving you that fast food, trying to meet a deadline. It ain't done until it's done sonically." For Aquemini, the duo used live instrumentation and improvisation, bringing a baby grand piano into the studio and hiring musicians who played "everything from stoner funk to prog rock". The producer Neal H. Pogue recalled, "That was the beauty of making all those records – having musicians come in and out. It was almost like a Motown, that's what we had. Or like a Stax Records thing. That's what I loved about it. It brought back that whole feeling of making records. It was organic." Much of the music on Aquemini was formulated during jam sessions, in which one musician would begin with creating a chord pattern and the rest would incorporate their instruments following that sequence. While recording Aquemini, André 3000 drew influence from reggae music and listened to Bob Marley constantly during the sessions. After the musical aspects of a song were developed, André 3000 and Big Boi would then create lyrics that they felt would fit with the tone of the song.

For the record, André 3000 did most of the album's production, while Big Boi crafted hooks for the songs. André 3000 and the producer Mr. DJ learned about beat creation through observing the members of Organized Noize at work, with Mr. DJ observing that despite André 3000's normally frugal lifestyle, his enthusiasm for production led him to splurge on costly recording equipment. At one point, André 3000 attempted singing and modifying his voice with pitch-correction equipment, but Big Boi warned him that this would alienate the group's urban audience. Another point of contention was the order of the track listing; Big Boi wanted to begin the album with "Y'all Scared" while André 3000 and the other producers and musicians wanted the first track to be "Return of the G", preferring that the record start with a song with just the duo as opposed to one with multiple collaborators. Big Boi missed his flight to attend the album mastering session and by the time he arrived, the others had already settled on a cohesive track list for the record. After a long, heated discussion, Big Boi eventually agreed to opening the album with "Return of the G". The album features the song "West Savannah", which had been recorded during the Southernplayalisticadillacmuzik sessions, and was included on Aquemini to give listeners a "bonus" that had sentimental value for the duo, as well as to pay homage to Big Boi's family living in Savannah.

== Musical style and lyrics ==
OutKast wore their musical connections easily, and sometimes literally. The references to 70s funk and soul weren't just in the deep, colour-saturated funk underpinning the whole album ... It's also a very musical album. Sure, there are samples, but it's mostly real musicians playing guitars and horns, or in the case of the charmingly named South Central Chamber Orchestra, strings and woodwind.

— Emma Warren of The Guardian, on the record's musical style.

Big Boi described the music on the album as "very experimental" noting that it featured live instrumentation that included horns, guitar, piano, and harmonica. AllMusic's Steve Huey detected the "ethereal futurism" of ATLiens in the music on Aquemini, but also noted that "more often Aquemini plants its feet on the ground for a surprisingly down-home flavor". He also observed a "Southern earthiness and simultaneous spirituality" in Organized Noize's production work on the record. According to Rashod D. Ollison of The Baltimore Sun, the album "fus[es] organic soul and progressive rap with touches of electro-funk, dub and rock". Similarly, The Boombox writer Todd "Stereo" Williams says the music fuses their debut album's raw funk with the "futuristic soul" of ATLiens for a sound that "genre-hop[s] from southern rap odes ('West Savannah') to flirtations with P-Funk ('Synthesizer'), hard rock guitars ('Chonkyfire')", and collaborations beyond the duo's core of Dungeon Family artists. Pitchfork stated that the album draws from southern soul, gospel, and country, and noted that it "favors live-band sounds without making the purist’s mistake of shunning synthetic ones," praising both "Preston Crump’s mellow, sustained basslines and the swing-friendly drum tracks of Mr. DJ and Organized Noize."

Lyrically, much of Aquemini features introspection about the desolation of the human condition, and themes related to individuality and self-determination. Overarching themes addressed on the record include drug addiction, precarious relationships, and freedom from self-inflicted struggles. Other subjects include excessive reliance on technology and the Atlanta club scene. On the record, the group often shifts between science fiction-inspired topics and the harsh realities of urban life. Saul Austerlitz of the Yale Herald notes the central theme of the group's "ability to move between two worlds—the G-funk glamorized by the Notorious B.I.G. and Tupac Shakur and the group's own spacier, more poetic excursions" in the album. Another theme is the duality of the two members and their differing personalities, with Big Boi as "the player" and Andre 3000 as "the poet", according to the album's cover. Big Boi generally covers the more conventional hip-hop topics such as his childhood in the South and attractive women, while Andre 3000 discusses more unorthodox themes. In contrast to much of hip hop music in the late 1990s, OutKast did not tone down the regional qualities, like the harmonica break on "Rosa Parks" and distinctive Atlanta slang and diction throughout. The duo experimented with several delivery styles on the record, using "relaxed, hyper, distorted, speedy and conversational presentations."

== Songs ==
"SpottieOttieDopaliscious"
The twelfth track on the album contains influence from reggae and spoken word musical styles and features a recurring horn riff throughout the song.

"Liberation"
This song delves into a variety of musical genres including gospel, jazz, blues, and world music. "Liberation" deviates from Outkast's traditional style by not including rapped vocals and instead featuring vocal alternations between singing and spoken word styles.

Aquemini's opening track "Hold On, Be Strong" was written by the session guitarist Donny Mathis and originally conceived as a full song with verses, but the group preferred to only use the refrain. André 3000 played a kalimba on the song after purchasing the instrument at a flea market, drawing inspiration from Earth, Wind & Fire. "Return of the G" addresses concerns from fans who felt that the group's style had changed too drastically since the release of Southernplayalisticadillacmuzik, as well as those who make poor decisions in order to keep their street credibility. When discussing the lyrical content of the song, André 3000 explained, "I was young and wilder and some of my fashion choices people didn't accept at the time. I started getting flak from some people, so they were like, 'Either he's gay or on drugs' ... 'Return of the Gangsta' was trying to give them a sense of, 'Hey, I'm still a regular person.'" "Rosa Parks" contains blues-influenced guitar work and folksy harmonies that "announce OutKast's distinctive style of Southern boogie. The groove goes into overdrive during a clapping, foot-stomping breakdown funkified by a fierce harmonica as the kick drum pounds incessantly."

The next track, "Skew It On the Bar-B", features the Wu-Tang Clan rapper Raekwon and discusses the disappointment of the group's debut album not achieving the coveted "five-mic" rating from The Source: "I gotta hit the Source / I need my other half mic / because that Southernplayalisticadillacmusik was a classic right?". "Skew It On the Bar-B" is followed by the title track, which has been compared to the music of the soul singer Isaac Hayes. Pogue experimented with delays and echos in his production to make the song "dimensional, like you could actually put your hands through the song." "Synthesizer" contains elements of electrofunk and features the funk musician George Clinton. Billboard called "Synthesizer" an "electronic-leaning... spasm of technological paranoia." Emma Warren of The Guardian called the track "raw and woozy", dubbing it the "weirdest moment of the record". On the seventh track, "Slump", Big Boi is joined by two members of the Dungeon Family as they describe their experiences selling dope. This is one of the few tracks that does not have Andre on it. On "West Savannah", Big Boi discusses his Southern roots, and references individuals who grew up outside of the South who fail to recognize different regional Southern identities by stating "You might call us country, but we's only Southern".

"Da Art of Storytellin' (Part 1)" tells the story of a self-destructive childhood friend named Sasha Thumper who dies of a drug overdose. Commenting on the song's lyrical content, author Mickey Hess remarks that André 3000 "manages to walk the fine line between emotionalism and masculinity by articulating this highly emotional narrative with an almost emotionless tone." The next track, "Da Art of Storytellin' (Part 2)", is an apocalyptic song that represents the group's vision of "the last song recorded in the world", with André 3000 commenting, "I do remember thinking, 'What if it was the end of the world and we had to get to the Dungeon on some X-Men superhero shit. I think I was vibing on some end-of-the-world, last-recorded-song shit'". Following is "Mamacita", which features Dungeon Crew rapper Masada in a meditation on male-female relationships, inspired by an ex-girlfriend of André 3000 who began pursuing women after their breakup. "SpottieOttieDopaliscious" relates a story of ill-fated romance, with André 3000 describing the infatuation during an encounter with a woman at a club and Big Boi noting the hopelessness of the relationship as the song progresses.

"Y'all Scared" is a collaboration with three members of Goodie Mob and contains the chant "If you scared, say you scared" accompanied by prominent organ and guitar work. "Nathaniel" is an a cappella rap by the group's close friend who at the time was an inmate in a Georgia prison, and the song is a recording of an actual collect call during his time in jail. The track is an introduction to "Liberation". The eight-minute-long "Liberation" combines a variety of musical styles, including gospel, jazz, blues, and world music. The song is notable for not including rapped vocals and instead features vocal alternations between singing and spoken word styles. Lyrically, the track utilizes images of slavery to symbolize artistic freedom and not being concerned with the opinions of the public and record labels. The album closes with "Chonkyfire", which features a fuzzy guitar riff and snippets from OutKast's speech at the 1995 Source Awards in which the group emphasized the Southern hip-hop scene as a legitimate subgenre. Billboard called "Chonkyfire" a track of "bad-trip psychedelic rock."

== Release ==
The group originally planned to create a film in conjunction with Aquemini, completing a script three months before the release of the record. OutKast met with MTV for the project, who, despite liking the idea for the film, hoped to instead buy the project and cast Missy Elliott and Busta Rhymes instead, feeling they had more "star power." Although the duo recalls being "heartbroken" at the time, André 3000 and Big Boi continued to work on ideas for a collaborative film, eventually resulting in the 2006 musical Idlewild starring the group. David Browne of The New York Times viewed the album art as an homage to blaxploitation films of the 1970s. The record's title is a combination of the two members' zodiac signs, with André 3000 being a Gemini and Big Boi being an Aquarius. The packaging featured a sticker describing Big Boi as "the playa" and André as "the poet".

Aquemini debuted behind Jay-Z's Vol. 2... Hard Knock Life at number two on the Billboard Hot 200, the same opening position of both ATLiens and the group's next release, Stankonia. The record sold 227,000 copies in its first week of release, ahead of A Tribe Called Quest's The Love Movement and Lauryn Hill's The Miseducation of Lauryn Hill. In Norway and Germany, the album peaked at numbers 39 and 66, respectively.

In 1999, civil rights activist Rosa Parks filed a lawsuit against OutKast for the song "Rosa Parks", claiming that the song used her name without her permission, constituting false advertising and an infringement on her right to publicity, in addition to defamation of character. The lawsuit was dismissed on first amendment grounds that year by a federal judge, but the appeals court partially reinstated the suit in 2003, stating that the group must have an artistic reason for titling the song with her name. The case was settled in 2005 with OutKast and LaFace Records agreeing to create educational programs to "enlighten today's youth about the significant role Rosa Parks played in making America a better place for all races."

== Critical reception ==
Professional ratings
Review scores
Source	Rating
AllMusic	5/5 stars
Chicago Sun-Times	3.5/4 stars
Christgau's Consumer Guide	A−
Entertainment Weekly	A
Los Angeles Times	4/4 stars
Q	5/5 stars
Rolling Stone	4/5 stars
Spin	9/10
Uncut	4/5 stars
USA Today	3.5/4 stars

Aquemini received widespread acclaim from critics. AllMusic's Steve Huey called it "a stroke of brilliance". He praised the record for avoiding the "hardcore clichés" and summed up his review by saying that Aquemini is "a virtuosic masterpiece, and a landmark hip-hop album of the late '90s". Robert Christgau also commented positively on the album, calling the record "evolved G-funk with denser instrumental crosstalk" and "rap-rock every bit as heavy as the bohrium and dubnium compounds hardheads hyped circa the Judgment Night soundtrack". Los Angeles Times writer Soren Baker complimented OutKast's "intelligent hip-hop" and commented that "musically, the collection supplies some of the lushest tracks ever included on a hip-hop record", noting that the music will "stimulate the mind, touch the soul and pack the dance floor." Q named it the group's "third best offering." Sia Michel of The Village Voice called it "an impassioned state-of-hip-hop address". In a brief review for Entertainment Weekly, Cheo Tyehimba qualified Aquemini as the hip-hop album of the year.

S. H. Fernando Jr. of Rolling Stone wrote "OutKast prove that you don't have to sell out to sell records. Sporting plenty of live chops and soulful harmonies, Aquemini's fresh, original feel defies rap's coastal clichés." Steve Jones of USA Today commented that the duo's "molasses-smooth raps speak to the stark realities of urban streets." Tony Green of Spin said that although they are not as spiritual as Goodie Mob, Outkast's "streetcorner signifying" offers listeners more than simple musical pleasure and that they "have crafted some of the most seductive and dramadelic textures." Giving it a five out of five "mic"-rating, Charlie Braxton of The Source praised the duo for "their superb use of the urban narrative." Braxton called Aquemini "a brilliant record" and commented that it "possesses an uncanny blend of sonic beauty, poignant lyricism and spirituality that compels without commanding".

In a retrospective review, Tim Stelloh from PopMatters described the album as a "loud, unpretentious, eclectic kick in the ass". He praised it for being "full of both fear and curiosity, and those emotions were channeled through its production." Dave Hughes, writing in Slant Magazine, stated: "Ten years on, Aquemini is the single strongest aspect of one of the art form's deepest benches. Snappier and more experimental than the pair's early work, and focused enough to feel comfortable in a sprawl, it's the moment when OutKast came fully into itself."

=== Accolades ===
Aquemini has been included in several publications' best album lists. In 2003, Rolling Stone ranked it number 500 on its list of the 500 Greatest Albums of All Time. The staff explained the inclusion by stating: "OutKast unleashed an explosive hip-hop that deployed live musicians, social commentary and a heavy dose of deep funk". The album was placed at number 11 on the list of the "100 Best Albums of the Nineties" by the same magazine. In 2020, they revised their 500 Greatest Albums of All Time list and re-ranked the album at number 49, calling it "the greatest record ever to come out of the Dirty South."

Paste called the album "the best Atlanta hip-hop album of all time". Pitchfork ranked the record at number 50 on their "Top 100 Albums of the 1990s", describing it as "smooth and well-conceived". Spin included it on three of their lists. They ranked it number 35 on the "90 Greatest Albums of the '90s" and number three on the "Top 20 Albums of '98". The magazine also ranked it 76th on their 2010 list of "The 125 Best Albums of the Past 25 Years". In 2004, Stylus ranked it 185th on their "Top 101-200 Favourite Albums Ever" list. In 2013, Vibe named it the 20th greatest album since 1993. Ego trip ranked it the second greatest hip hop album from 1980 to 1998, while Hip-Hop Connection ranked it the 11th greatest rap album from 1995 to 2005. New Nation named it the 80th best album by black artists. In 2017, The Boombox ranked it second on a list of the 50 greatest alternative hip hop albums. The album was also included on Apple Music's 100 Best Albums list at number 41 in 2024.

The album was included in Blender's "500 CDs You Must Own Before You Die" (2003), Continuum Books' 33 1/3: A Series of Books about Critically Acclaimed Albums, and Q's "The Ultimate Music Collection" (2005). The lead single "Rosa Parks" was nominated in the category Grammy Award for Best Rap Performance by a Duo or Group at the 1999 Grammy Awards. The album's twelfth track "SpottieOttieDopaliscious" was ranked at number 16 on Pitchfork Media's list of the top 200 tracks of the 1990s.

== Legacy ==
Aquemini is a hip-hop classic that pushes the limits of what we normally consider hip-hop, yet is decidedly true to its roots.

— AllHipHop, on the album's legacy

Critics hailed the recording as OutKast's most fully realized up to that time and one of the best of the 1990s. Steve Huey wrote: "Aquemini fulfills all its ambitions, covering more than enough territory to qualify it as a virtuosic masterpiece, and a landmark hip-hop album of the late '90s". Ebony observed that Aquemini is "perhaps OutKast's best effort" and "a huge commercial and artistic success". Matt Wink concluded that OutKast with this album "carved their place in the game and grabbed the world's attention. No two people with a similar background could be more different and no two artists could have made this masterpiece."

Los Angeles Times labeled the album "OutKast's third brilliant slice of hip-hop". Rolling Stone wrote that "Atlanta's reputation as hip-hop's most avant-garde area code – the Long Island of the Nineties – was cemented" with this effort, while Troy L. Smith of Cleveland.com said it was "a true game-changer for [Southern hip hop] and Outkast". In a column for Jazz Times, Tony Green wrote that "OutKast's Aquemini dispels any notion that hip-hop is out of sonic ideas. If anything, it shows that the genre's appetite for new sounds is as ravenous as ever." According to Emma Warren from The Guardian, this album is "a high point of 90s hip-hop" and proof that "the old push and pull between the east and west coast of American hip-hop was over". Tim Stelloh of PopMatters felt that "Aquemini far surpassed OutKast's previous release A-tliens [sic], and made the group one of those rare commercial anomalies—kind of like Nirvana, Rage Against the Machine, or Public Enemy". Several reviewers of Kendrick Lamar's Good Kid, M.A.A.D City (2012) perceived influence from Aquemini in the record's production and aesthetic.

== Track listing ==
Track listing and samples compiled from album liner notes.

No.	Title	Writer(s)	Producer(s)	Length
1.	"Hold On, Be Strong"	Donny Mathis	Donny Mathis; Outkast	1:11
2.	"Return of the 'G'"	Giorgio Moroder; Organized Noize; Antwan Patton; André Benjamin	Organized Noize	4:49
3.	"Rosa Parks"	Patton; Benjamin	Outkast	5:24
4.	"Skew It on the Bar-B" (featuring Raekwon)	Morton Stevens; Organized Noize; Patton; Benjamin; Corey Woods	Organized Noize	3:15
5.	"Aquemini"	Patton; Benjamin	Outkast	5:19
6.	"Synthesizer" (featuring George Clinton)	Patton; Benjamin; George Clinton	Outkast	5:11
7.	"Slump"	Patton; Jamahr Williams; Frederick Bell	Outkast	5:09
8.	"West Savannah"	Organized Noize; Patton	Organized Noize	4:03
9.	"Da Art of Storytellin' (Pt. 1)"	David Sheats; Patton; Benjamin	Mr. DJ	3:43
10.	"Da Art of Storytellin' (Pt. 2)"	Sheats; Patton; Benjamin	Mr. DJ	2:48
11.	"Mamacita"	Organized Noize; Patton; Benjamin; Masada Hogans; Erin Johnson	Organized Noize	5:52
12.	"SpottieOttieDopaliscious"	Patton; Benjamin; Patrick Brown	Outkast	7:07
13.	"Y'all Scared" (featuring T-Mo, Big Gipp, and Khujo)	Sheats; Patton; Benjamin; Robert Barnett; Willie Knighton, Jr.; Cameron Gipp	Mr. DJ	4:50
14.	"Nathaniel"			1:10
15.	"Liberation" (with Cee-Lo and Erykah Badu)	Patton; Benjamin; Ruben Bailey; Erica Wright; Joi Gilliam; Myrna Crenshaw; Thomas Burton	OutKast	8:46
16.	"Chonkyfire"	Patton; Benjamin	Outkast	6:10
Total length:				74:47

Notes

- The vinyl edition moves "Chonkyfire" after "Y'all Scared".
- The clean version of the album has all of the skits in between the songs removed. The interlude "Nathaniel" was omitted, as was the fifth verse of "Liberation".
- "Hold On, Be Strong" features vocals by 4.0, better known as The Four Phonics
- "Slump" features vocals by Backbone and Cool Breeze
- "Mamacita" features vocals by Masada, Witchdoctor and Buulllllll!
- "West Savannah" and "SpottieOttieDopaliscious" feature vocals by Sleepy Brown
- "Liberation" features vocals by Erykah Badu, Ruben Bailey, Joi and Whild Peach

Sample credits

- "Return of the 'G'" contains interpolations from "Superfly" by Curtis Mayfield.
- "Rosa Parks" contains interpolations from "Cancion de Amor" by The Sandpipers.
- "Skew It on the Bar-B" contains an interpolation of "Police Woman" performed by Henry Mancini.
- "Synthesizer" contains an interpolation of "Rock Dirge" performed by Sly Stone.
- "Da Art of Storytellin' (Pt.2)" contains samples from "Spirit of the Water" performed by Camel.
- "SpottieOttieDopaliscious" contains excerpts from "Dancing with the Moonlit Knight" performed by Genesis.
- "Y'All Scared" contains interpolations from "Air Born" performed by Camel.

== Personnel ==
Credits are adapted from AllMusic.

=== Musicians ===
- Andre 3000 – vocals, kalimba (on "Hold On, Be Strong")
- Big Boi – vocals
- Raekwon – vocals
- The Four Phonics – vocals
- Erykah Badu – vocals
- Ruben Bailey – vocals
- Big Gipp – vocals
- Pat Brown – vocals
- Cee Lo Green – vocals
- Cool Breeze – vocals
- Delvida Flaherty – vocals
- Joi Gilliam – vocals
- Lil' Will – vocals
- Goodie Mob – vocals
- Witchdoctor – vocals
- Joi – vocals
- Khujo – vocals
- T-Mo – vocals
- CJ Jones – vocals
- Jamahr Williams – vocals
- Whild Peach – vocals
- Charles Veal – concert master, orchestral arrangements
- The South Central Chamber Orchestra – strings, woodwind
- Marvin "Chanz" Parkman – bass guitar, piano, synthesizer
- Victor Alexander – drums
- Omar Phillips – percussion
- Darian Emory – horn
- LaMarquis Mark Jefferson – bass guitar
- Skinny Miracles – bass guitar
- Kenneth Wright – synthesizer
- Craig Love – guitar
- Tomi Martin – guitar
- Martin Terry – electric guitar
- Jim Sitterly – violin
- Mr. DJ – scratching
- George Clinton – background vocals
- Sleepy Brown – background vocals
- Jermaine Smith – background vocals
- Jim Smith – background vocals
- Debra Killings – background vocals

=== Technical ===
- Babyface – executive producer
- OutKast – executive producer, producer
- Organized Noize – composer, executive producer, producer, programming
- Mr. DJ Sheats – arranger, mixing, producer
- Courtney Taylor – coordination
- Josh Butler – mixing
- Jonnie Davis "Most" – mixing
- Shawn Grove – mixing assistant
- Claudine Pontier – mixing assistant
- Brian Gardner – mastering
- Blake Eiseman – engineering
- Jean B. Smit – engineering
- Bernasky Wall – engineering
- Ryan Williams – engineering
- Ralph Cacciurri – assistant engineer
- Ricco Lumpkins – assistant engineer
- Alberto Perez – assistant engineer
- Jason Rome – assistant engineer
- Kenny Stallworth – assistant engineer
- Jason Stokes – assistant engineer
- Katy Teasdale – assistant engineer
- D.L. Warfield – art direction, design
- Nigel Sawyer – assistant art director, design assistant
- Greg Hawkins – artwork
- Tom Smugala – photography

== Charts ==
=== Weekly charts ===
Chart (1998)	Peak position
Canadian Albums (Billboard)	17
German Albums (Offizielle Top 100)	66
Norwegian Albums (VG-lista)	39
US Billboard 200	2
US Top R&B/Hip-Hop Albums (Billboard)	2

=== Year-end charts ===
Chart (1998)	Position
US Billboard 200	109
US Top R&B/Hip-Hop Albums (Billboard)	41

Chart (1999)	Position
US Billboard 200	84
US Top R&B/Hip-Hop Albums (Billboard)	39

== Certifications ==
Region	Certification	Certified units/sales
Canada (Music Canada)	Gold	50,000^{^}
United Kingdom (BPI)	Silver	60,000^{‡}
United States (RIAA)	3× Platinum	3,000,000^{‡}
^{^} Shipments figures based on certification alone.^{‡} Sales+streaming figures based on certification alone.

== Bibliography ==
- Hess, Mickey, ed. (2007). Icons of Hip Hop: An Encyclopedia of the Movement, Music, and Culture. ABC-CLIO. ISBN 978-0-313-33903-5.
- Miller, Kiri, ed. (June 21, 2010). Traveling Home: Sacred Harp Singing and American Pluralism (Music in American Life). University of Illinois Press. ISBN 978-0-252-07757-9.
- Nickson, Chris (September 1, 2004). Hey Ya!: The Unauthorized Biography Of OutKast. Macmillan. ISBN 0-312-33735-3.
- Sarig, Roni, ed. (May 1, 2007). Third Coast: OutKast, Timbaland, and How Hip-Hop Became a Southern Thing. Da Capo Press. ISBN 978-0-306-81430-3.
- Wang, Oliver, ed. (May 1, 2003). Classic Material: The Hip-Hop Album Guide. ECW Press. ISBN 1-55022-561-8.
