= Concrete Law =

Studio album by Backbone a.k.a. Mr. Fat Face 100
- Released: June 19, 2001
- Genre: Hip hop
- Length: 1:07:00
- Label: Universal Records
- Producer: Brandon Peters; CeeLo Green; Earthtone III; Edex; Lucky Calhoun; Mark Twayne; Marvin "Chanz" Parkman; Montez Harris; Organized Noize; Rondal Rucker

Singles from Concrete Law
- 1. "Five, Deuce, Four, Tre" Released: 2001; 2. "O.K." Released: 2001

Professional ratings
Review scores
Source	Rating
AllMusic	2/5 stars
Robert Christgau	(choice cut)
Vibe	3.5/5 marks

Concrete Law is the debut solo studio album by American rapper and the Dungeon Family member Backbone. It was released on June 19, 2001, via Universal Records. Production was handled by Organized Noize, Brandon Peters, Lucky Calhoun, Montez Harris, Cee-Lo, Earthtone III, Edex, Mark Twayne, Marvin "Chanz" Parkman and Rondal Rucker. It features guest appearances from Slic Patna, Blvd. International, Big Rube, C-Bone, Chamdon, Cool Breeze, Joi, Killer Mike, Sleepy Brown, Slimm Calhoun, Witchdoctor, YoungBloodZ, and all the four members of the Goodie Mob. The album peaked at number 128 on the Billboard 200 and number 28 on the Top R&B/Hip-Hop Albums in the United States. Its lead single, "5 Deuce 4 Tre", gained minor success on the Billboard charts reaching #93 on the Hot R&B/Hip-Hop Songs.

== Track listing ==
No.	Title	Producer(s)	Length
1.	"Intro"	Marvin "Chanz" Parkman	0:28
2.	"Concrete Law"	Organized Noize	3:57
3.	"Like This" (featuring Odd Ball and Blvd. International)	Cee-Lo	4:51
4.	"Jump Back"	Montez Harris; Brandon Peters	3:29
5.	"5 Deuce - 4 Tre"	Organized Noize	4:08
6.	"Hit & Run" (featuring Slic Patna and Blvd. International)	Organized Noize	3:56
7.	"Lord Have Mercy" (featuring Cee-Lo and Joi)	Organized Noize	4:56
8.	"Come See Me" (featuring Sleepy Brown)	Cedric "Swift C" Barnett	4:24
9.	"Believe That" (featuring Big Gipp and Slimm Calhoun)	Earthtone III	4:43
10.	"O.K." (featuring Shawty Putt and C-Bone)	Edex	4:43
11.	"50 Deep" (featuring Chamdon and YoungBloodZ)	Mark Twayne	5:23
12.	"Dungeon Ratz" (featuring Lumberjacks, Witchdoctor and Big Rube)	Organized Noize	5:18
13.	"Under Streetlights"	Rondal Rucker	4:06
14.	"Puttin On" (featuring Cool Breeze)	Cedric "Swift C" Barnett	3:47
15.	"Sho Ya Right!" (featuring Killer Mike)	Organized Noize	3:57
16.	"Yes Yes Y'all" (featuring Slic Patna)	Organized Noize	3:32
17.	"Wheatskraw Outro"	Montez Harris; Brandon Peters	1:22
Total length:			1:07:00

== Charts ==
Chart (2001)	Peak position
US Billboard 200	128
US Top R&B/Hip-Hop Albums (Billboard)	28
US Heatseekers Albums (Billboard)	3
