= Kinfolk (album) =

Studio album by Ali & Gipp
- Released: August 14, 2007
- Recorded: 2006–2007
- Genre: Hip hop
- Length: 1:09:30
- Label: Derrty; Universal Motown
- Producer: Ali (exec.); Big Gipp (exec.); Nelly (exec.); Kevin Law (exec.); Dallas Austin; DJ Speedy; Jason "Jay E" Epperson; Jasper Cameron; Jermaine Dupri; Nitti; Stee; The Trak Starz; Trife; T-Wayne

Ali chronology
Heavy Starch (2002)	Kinfolk (2007)

Big Gipp chronology
Mutant Mindframe (2003)	Kinfolk (2007)

Professional ratings
Review scores
Source	Rating
AllMusic	3.5/5 stars
Entertainment Weekly	C
RapReviews	7/10

Kinfolk is the only studio album by American hip hop duo Ali & Gipp, consisting of Ali Jones of St. Lunatics and Big Gipp of Goodie Mob. It was released on August 14, 2007 through Universal Motown. Production was handled by DJ Speedy, Stee, The Trak Starz, T-Wayne, Dallas Austin, Jay E, Jasper Cameron, Jermaine Dupri, Nitti and Trife. It features guest appearances from Nelly, Murphy Lee, Avery Storm, Big Rube, Bun B, CeeLo Green, Chocolate Tai, David Banner, Jasper Cameron, Juvenile, Kyjuan, LeToya Luckett, Lloyd, Tamala Jones and Three 6 Mafia. The album peaked at number 174 on the U.S. Billboard 200 chart.

The album was preceded by the single "Go 'Head" featuring Chocolate Tai. Three further singles were released from the album: "N da Paint" featuring Nelly, "Work Dat, Twerk Dat" featuring Murphy Lee and "Almost Made Ya" featuring LeToya Luckett.

== Track listing ==
No.	Title	Producer(s)	Length
1.	"Intro" (featuring Big Rube)	DJ Speedy	1:10
2.	"Hood" (featuring Nelly and Pimp C)	Stee; T-Wayne	5:32
3.	"N' da Paint" (featuring Nelly)	Nitti	4:36
4.	"Go 'Head" (featuring Chocolate Tai)	Trife	3:45
5.	"Almost Made Ya" (featuring LeToya Luckett)	Jermaine Dupri; LRoc (co.); No I.D. (co.)	4:10
6.	"Get on da Floor" (featuring David Banner)	Stee; T-Wayne	5:14
7.	"That's Me"	Jason "Jay E" Epperson	5:17
8.	"Lean'n" (featuring Murphy Lee and Nelly)	The Trak Starz	4:26
9.	"I Told Ya" (featuring Cee-Lo Green and Bun B)	DJ Speedy	4:09
10.	"If We Fuck" (featuring Jasper Cameron and Lloyd)	Jasper Cameron	4:14
11.	"What's the Business" (featuring Three 6 Mafia)	DJ Speedy	3:41
12.	"All Night Excuse Me" (featuring Nelly, Avery Storm and Juvenile)	The Trak Starz	4:05
13.	"Work Dat, Twerk Dat" (featuring Murphy Lee)	DJ Speedy; Ekstreme (co.)	4:11
14.	"Forever and Ever"	DJ Speedy	3:54
15.	"Get By" (featuring Tamala Jones and Kyjuan)	DJ Speedy	4:11
16.	"No God But You"	Dallas Austin	3:08
Total length:			1:09:30

== Charts ==
Chart (2007)	Peak position
US Billboard 200	174
US Top R&B/Hip-Hop Albums (Billboard)	25
US Top Rap Albums (Billboard)	9
