= One Monkey Don't Stop No Show (album) =

Studio album by Goodie Mob
- Released: June 29, 2004
- Recorded: 2003–2004
- Genre: Southern hip hop
- Length: 1:07:28
- Label: Koch
- Producer: Bread and Water; Cool & Dre; DJ Paul; Juicy J; Jasper Cameron; J. Wells; Mark Twayne; Ray Murray; Speedy

Goodie Mob chronology
World Party (1999)	One Monkey Don't Stop No Show (2004)	Age Against the Machine (2013)

One Monkey Don't Stop No Show is the fourth studio album by American hip hop group Goodie Mob. It was released on June 29, 2004, via Koch Records. The album was produced by Speedy, Ray Murray, Mark Twayne, Bread and Water, Cool & Dre, DJ Paul, Jasper Cameron, and J. Wells. It features guest appearances from Witchdoctor, Big Rube, Bone Crusher, Gator Boy, Jasper Cameron, Kurupt, Mario Simpson, Melanie "Melbo" Smith, Oozie, and Sleepy Brown. The album peaked at number 85 on the Billboard 200, number 15 on the Top R&B/Hip-Hop Albums, number 10 on the Top Rap Albums and number 4 on the Independent Albums in the United States.

== Background ==
The album does not include one of the group's former frontmen, CeeLo Green, because he broke away to pursue his solo career. That left Khujo, T-Mo and Big Gipp to hold up the album. Released in 2004 under independent record label, Koch, after the critical failure of World Party, the crunk and pop experiment, which sold more than any of their other albums. The title of the album is interpreted as a dig at CeeLo. The condensed Goodie Mob returns more to its socially conscious form of its first two releases, Soul Food and Still Standing. The song "Play Your Flutes" was released as the only single off the album.

== Critical reception ==
Professional ratings
Aggregate scores
Source	Rating
Metacritic	61/100
Review scores
Source	Rating
AllMusic	3/5 stars
Robert Christgau	(dud)
The Guardian	3/5 stars
HipHopDX	3.5/5
Now	3/5 Ns
RapReviews	8/10
(The New) Rolling Stone Album Guide	3/5 stars

One Monkey Don't Stop No Show was met with generally favourable reviews from music critics. At Metacritic, which assigns a normalised rating out of 100 to reviews from mainstream publications, the album received an average score of 61, based on nine reviews.

James Corne of RapReviews found "Goodie Mob sounds newly rejuvenated, almost vivified by the tremendous odds they faced coming back instead of impeded by it". AllMusic's David Jeffries wrote: "uneven, especially compared to their earlier records, and less ambitious than the "bring it on" misinterpretation of the title might make you think". Dorian Lynskey of The Guardian concluded: "on their own terms, at least, they deliver".

== Track listing ==
No.	Title	Producer(s)	Length
1.	"Synopsis" (featuring Big Rube)	Speedy	1:22
2.	"God I Wanna Live" (featuring Witchdoctor)	Ray Murray	4:56
3.	"123 Goodie"	DJ Paul; Juicy J	4:56
4.	"Shawty Wanna Be a Gangsta"	Ray Murray	5:18
5.	"In da Streets" (featuring Jasper Cameron)	Jasper Cameron	4:21
6.	"One Monkey"	Ray Murray	3:12
7.	"Dead Homies"	Cool & Dre	4:17
8.	"Introducing: Gator Boy (Skit)" (featuring Gator Boy and Oozie)	Speedy	2:23
9.	"Grindin" (featuring Bone Crusher)	Speedy	4:19
10.	"Goodiadvice"	Bread and Water	4:28
11.	"We Back"	Mark Twayne	4:19
12.	"It Ain't Nothin for Us"	Mark Twayne	3:38
13.	"High & Low" (featuring Mario Simpson)	Speedy	5:48
14.	"Big City"	Speedy	4:56
15.	"What You See" (featuring Witchdoctor and Melanie "Melbo" Smith)	Speedy	3:52
16.	"Play Your Flutes" (featuring Kurupt and Sleepy Brown)	J. Wells	5:23
Total length:			1:07:28

== Charts ==
Chart (2004)	Peak position
US Billboard 200	85
US Top R&B/Hip-Hop Albums (Billboard)	15
US Top Rap Albums (Billboard)	10
US Independent Albums (Billboard)	4
