= World Party (album) =

Studio album by Goodie Mob
- Released: December 21, 1999
- Recorded: 1998–1999
- Studios: The Dungeon (SWATS, GA); Studio 56 (Los Angeles, CA); Lions' Den (New York, NY); Stankonia (Atlanta, GA); DARP (Atlanta, GA); Silent Sound (Atlanta, GA); Songbird (Atlanta, GA); PatchWerk (Atlanta, GA); Doppler (Atlanta, GA); Unique (New York, NY)
- Genre: Hip hop
- Length: 54:57
- Labels: LaFace; Arista
- Producers: CeeLo Green; Coptic; Cyptron; Dallas Austin; Deric "D-Dot" Angelettie; Derrick Trotman; Easy Mo Bee; Kanye West; Mr. DJ; Organized Noize; Rondal Rucker; T-Mo

Goodie Mob chronology
Still Standing (1998)	World Party (1999)	One Monkey Don't Stop No Show (2004)

Singles from World Party
- 1. "Get Rich to This" Released: December 21, 1999; 2. "What It Ain't (Ghetto Enuff)" Released: 2000

Professional ratings
Review scores
Source	Rating
AllMusic	3/5 stars
Robert Christgau	A−
RapReviews	8/10
Rolling Stone	3.5/5 stars
Spin	8/10
The New Rolling Stone Album Guide	3/5 stars

World Party is the third studio album by the American hip hop quartet Goodie Mob. It was released on December 21, 1999, via LaFace/Arista Records. The recording sessions took place at the Dungeon in SWATS, at Studio 56 in Los Angeles, at Lion's Den Studio and Unique Recording Studios in New York City, at Stankonia Recording, DARP Studios, Silent Sound Studios, Songbird Studios, PatchWerk Recording Studios and Doppler Studios in Atlanta. The album was produced by Organized Noize, Deric "D-Dot" Angelettie, CeeLo Green, Coptic, Cyptron, Dallas Austin, Derrick Trotman, Easy Mo Bee, Kanye West, Mr. DJ, Rondal Rucker, and T-Mo. It features guest appearances from Backbone, Sleepy Brown, Big Boi, Joi, and TLC. The album peaked at number 48 on the Billboard 200 and number 8 on the Top R&B/Hip-Hop Albums in the United States. On January 24, 2000, it received Gold status by the Recording Industry Association of America for selling 500,000 copies.

The album spawned two singles: "Get Rich to This", which peaked at No. 65 on the Hot R&B/Hip-Hop Songs and No. 59 on the R&B/Hip-Hop Airplay, and "What It Ain't (Ghetto Enuff)".

The album was the group's last album with the original four members until Age Against the Machine in 2013.

Former National Football League cornerback Asante Samuel has a tattoo on his left arm that says "Get Rich to This", because he liked that song in college.

== Track listing ==
No.	Title	Writer(s)	Producer(s)	Length
1.	"Invitation to the World Party"			0:39
2.	"World Party"	Cameron Gipp; Robert Barnett; Thomas Callaway; Willie Knighton; Patrick Brown; Ray Murray; Rico Wade; Lionel Richie	Organized Noize	4:06
3.	"Chain Swing"	Gipp; Barnett; Callaway; Knighton; Deric Angelettie; Derrick Trotman; Eric Matlock; Kenny Gamble; Cary Gilbert; Leon Huff	Deric "D-Dot" Angelettie; Derrick Trotman; Coptic	4:22
4.	"Get Rich to This / Parking Lot (Break)" (featuring Big Boi and Backbone)	Gipp; Barnett; Callaway; Knighton; Antwan Patton; Jamahr Williams; Brown; Murray; Wade	Organized Noize	5:11
5.	"The Dip"	Gipp; Barnett; Callaway; Knighton	T-Mo; CeeLo Green	4:12
6.	"All A's" (featuring Backbone)	Gipp; Barnett; Callaway; Knighton; Williams; David Sheats	Mr. DJ	5:26
7.	"What It Ain't (Ghetto Enuff)" (featuring TLC)	Gipp; Barnett; Callaway; Knighton; Lisa Lopes; Dallas Austin	Dallas Austin; Cyptron	4:46
8.	"I.C.U." (featuring Sleepy Brown)	Gipp; Barnett; Callaway; Knighton; Brown; Murray; Wade	Organized Noize	3:51
9.	"Rebuilding"	Gipp; Barnett; Callaway; Knighton; Angelettie; Kanye West; Bob James	Deric "D-Dot" Angelettie; Kanye West	4:38
10.	"Just Do It / Poochie (Break)"	Gipp; Barnett; Callaway; Knighton; Rondal Rucker	Rondal Rucker	5:31
11.	"Street Corner" (featuring Backbone and Joi)	Gipp; Barnett; Callaway; Knighton; Williams; Joi Gilliam; Brown; Murray; Wade	Organized Noize	3:00
12.	"Cutty Buddy" (featuring Sleepy Brown)	Gipp; Barnett; Callaway; Knighton; Brown; Murray; Wade; Bolivar Troncoso	Organized Noize	3:49
13.	"Fie Fie Delish"	Gipp; Barnett; Callaway; Knighton; Osten Harvey, Jr.; David Jay Weiss; Don Edward Fagenson	Easy Mo Bee	3:44
14.	"Go Back (Break)"			1:07
Total length:				54:57

== Charts ==
=== Weekly charts ===
Chart (2000)	Peak position
US Billboard 200	48
US Top R&B/Hip-Hop Albums (Billboard)	8

=== Year-end charts ===
Chart (2000)	Position
US Top R&B/Hip-Hop Albums (Billboard)	83

== Certifications ==
Region	Certification	Certified units/sales
United States (RIAA)	Gold	500,000^{^}
^{^} Shipments figures based on certification alone.
