= Survival Kit (album) =

Studio album by Goodie Mob
- Released: November 13, 2020
- Genre: Hip-hop
- Length: 53:47
- Label: Goodie Mob Worldwide
- Producer: Organized Noize

Goodie Mob chronology
Age Against the Machine (2013)	Survival Kit (2020)

Professional ratings
Review scores
Source	Rating
Beats Per Minute	74/100

Survival Kit is the sixth studio album by American Atlanta-based hip-hop group Goodie Mob. It was released on November 13, 2020. Production was handled by Organized Noize. It features guest appearances from Big Rube, André 3000, Big Boi, Chuck D and D.C. Young Fly.

== Background ==
T-Mo stated that the reason Goodie Mob made the album Survival Kit was to respond the Black Lives Matter movement and the police brutality, saying, "Right now, just seeing all of our people on TV marching and protesting and being shot at, bottles and stuff being chucked at the police, people burning down buildings and looting because we’re tired of all of the injustices". Cee-Lo Green said that the group were "inclined by the opportunity and commanded by the circumstance … there's never a better time than the here and now to do something that you wanted to do. Something that you're able to do, and in that process, remind your audience and the industry, and the world at large that you are here for reason and purpose. Our purpose is not solely to entertain but to also convey that message, and make that connection with the people".

== Track listing ==
All music is composed by Organized Noize.

No.	Title	Writer(s)	Length
1.	"Are You Ready" (featuring Chuck D)	Cameron Gipp; Willie Knighton; Robert Barnett; Thomas Callaway; Ray Murray; Rico Wade; Carlton Ridenhour	3:04
2.	"Frontline"	Gipp; Knighton; Barnett; Callaway; Murray; Wade	3:14
3.	"Curry Goat"	Gipp; Knighton; Barnett; Callaway; Murray; Wade	3:56
4.	"No Cigar" (featuring André 3000)	Gipp; Knighton; Barnett; Callaway; Murray; Wade; André Benjamin	4:36
5.	"Prey 4 Da Sheep" (featuring Big Boi)	Gipp; Knighton; Barnett; Callaway; Murray; Wade; Antwan Patton	3:55
6.	"DC Young Fly Crowe's Nest Break (Skit)" (featuring D.C. Young Fly)	Gipp; Knighton; Barnett; Callaway; Murray; Wade; D.C. Young Fly	0:25
7.	"4 My Ppl"	Gipp; Knighton; Barnett; Callaway; Murray; Wade	4:26
8.	"Big Rube's Road Break" (featuring Big Rube)	Gipp; Knighton; Barnett; Callaway; Ruben Bailey; Michael Johnson	0:52
9.	"Off-Road"	Gipp; Knighton; Barnett; Callaway; Murray; Wade	3:51
10.	"Try We"	Gipp; Knighton; Barnett; Callaway; Murray; Wade	4:19
11.	"Me Tyme"	Gipp; Knighton; Barnett; Callaway; Murray; Wade	3:43
12.	"Back2Back"	Gipp; Knighton; Barnett; Callaway; Murray; Wade	3:46
13.	"Survival Kit"	Gipp; Knighton; Barnett; Callaway; Murray; Wade	3:25
14.	"Calm B 4 Da Storm"	Gipp; Knighton; Barnett; Callaway; Murray; Wade	5:37
15.	"Big Rube's Amazing Break" (featuring Big Rube)	Gipp; Knighton; Barnett; Callaway; Murray; Wade; Bailey	1:16
16.	"Amazing Grays"	Gipp; Knighton; Barnett; Callaway; Murray; Wade	3:32
Total length:			53:47

== Charts ==
Chart performance for Survival Kit
Chart (2020)	Peak position
Top Current Album Sales (Billboard)	94
