= A.T.L. 2 (A-Town Legends 2) =

Studio album by Pastor Troy, Khujo and T-Mo
- Released: July 22, 2008
- Genre: Southern hip hop
- Length: 48:39
- Label: Siccness.net

Pastor Troy chronology
A.T.L. (A-Town Legend) (2008)	A.T.L. 2 (A-Town Legends 2) (2008)	TROY (2008)

Khujo chronology
G-Mob Godfather (2008)	A.T.L. 2 (A-Town Legends 2) (2008)	Georgiavania (2009)

T-Mo chronology
Livin' Life as Lumberjacks (2005)	A.T.L. 2 (A-Town Legends 2) (2008)	Age Against the Machine (2013)

A.T.L. 2 (A-Town Legends 2) is a collaborative studio album by American rappers Pastor Troy, Khujo and T-Mo. It was released on July 22, 2008 via Siccness.net, serving as a sequel to Troy's A.T.L. (A-Town Legend). The album peaked at number 73 on the Top R&B/Hip-Hop Albums.

== Track listing ==
All tracks are written by Micah Troy, Willie Knighton and Robert Barnett, except track 2 written by Micah Troy.

No.	Title	Length
1.	"The Beginning"	0:55
2.	"PT Cruiser"	2:47
3.	"Legendary"	4:22
4.	"Got to Lose"	5:14
5.	"True to It"	4:07
6.	"Lumberjack"	5:13
7.	"Pictures"	4:30
8.	"Cigarette"	5:08
9.	"Grown Man"	3:05
10.	"What I Live 4"	3:20
11.	"You Know I Pimp Hard"	4:46
12.	"Freaky"	3:40
13.	"PT & Goodie Mob"	1:35
Total length:		48:39

== Charts ==
Chart (2008)	Peak position
US Top R&B/Hip-Hop Albums (Billboard)	73
