= Cool Breeze (rapper) =

American rapper

- Also known as: Freddie Calhoun
- Born: Frederick Bell; August 12, 1971 (age 54)
- Origin: East Point, Georgia, U.S.
- Genres: Hip hop
- Occupation: Rapper
- Years active: 1995–2011
- Label: Interscope
- Member of: Dungeon Family; The Calhouns

Frederick Bell (born August 12, 1971), better known by his stage name Cool Breeze is an American rapper and a member of Southern hip hop collective Dungeon Family. He released his debut solo album East Point's Greatest Hit in 1999. In 2001, he joined up with two rappers from a group called Sniper Unit and became known as Freddie Calhoun. He features on and is the origin to the title phrase of the 1996 Billboard Hot 100 single "Dirty South" on Goodie Mob's debut album Soul Food. His 1998 single "Watch for the Hook" featuring Goodie Mob, Outkast and Witchdoctor reached the Billboard Hot 100 at #73 and topped the US Hot Rap Songs chart.

== Discography ==
=== Albums ===
- East Point's Greatest Hit (1999)
- Made in the Dirdy South (with the Calhouns) (2002)

=== Guest appearances ===
- "Judas" from Society of Soul album Brainchild (1995)
- "Dirty South" f/ Big Boi from Goodie Mob album Soul Food (1995)
- "Decatur Psalm" f/ Big Gipp from Outkast album ATLiens (1996)
- "Angelic Wars" f/ Lumberjacks and Backbone from Set It Off: Music From the New Line Cinema Motion Picture (1996)
- "All I Need Is Weed"; "Realism" f/ Backbone from Sniper Unit album Burnt Up City (1996)
- "Gangsta Partna" f/ Big Boi from Music Inspired By the Motion Picture Hoodlum (1997)
- "Georgia Plains (Holy Grounds)" from Witchdoctor album ...A S.W.A.T Healin' Ritual (1998)
- "The Damm" from Goodie Mob album Still Standing (1998)
- "Slump" f/ Backbone from Outkast album Aquemini (1998)
- "Puttin On" from Backbone album Concrete Law (2001)
- "Forever Pimpin' (Never Slippin')"; "6 Minutes (Dungeon Family It's On)" f/ Big Boi, Witchdoctor, Goodie Mob, Backbone & Big Rube from Dungeon Family album Even in Darkness (2001)
- "Claremont Lounge" f/ Bubba Sparxxx & Killer Mike from Purple Ribbon All-Stars album Got Purp? Vol. 2 (2005) and Bubba Sparxxx album The Charm (2006)

== Filmography ==
- Mystery Men
