= T-Mo =

American rapper (born 1972)

- Also known as: T-Mo Goodie
- Born: Robert Terrance Barnett; February 2, 1972 (age 54); Fairburn, Georgia, U.S.
- Origin: Atlanta, Georgia, U.S.
- Genres: Southern hip hop
- Years active: 1994–present
- Label: Stronghouse Productions
- Website: tmogoodie.com; Twitter

Robert Terrance Barnett (born February 2, 1972), better known by his stage name T-Mo Goodie (or simply T-Mo), is an American rapper from Atlanta, Georgia. He is best known for being a member of Southern hip hop quartet Goodie Mob. He is also one-half of the hip hop duo the Lumberjacks (with fellow Goodie Mob groupmate Khujo), and a member of hip hop collective Dungeon Family. He released his first solo project 2 the Fullest on October 31, 2000, via Stronghouse Productions.

He earned his Bachelor of Science degree from Morris Brown College in Atlanta, Georgia.

== Discography ==
- 2000 – T-Mo 2 the Fullest
- 2008 – Freedom

Collaborative albums

- 1995 – Soul Food (w/ Khujo, Big Gipp, and Cee-Lo Green)
- 1998 – Still Standing (w/ Khujo, Big Gipp, and Cee-Lo Green)
- 1999 – World Party (w/ Khujo, Big Gipp, and Cee-Lo Green)
- 2004 – One Monkey Don't Stop No Show (w/ Khujo and Big Gipp)
- 2005 – The Goodie Mob Presents: Livin' Life as Lumberjacks (w/ Khujo)
- 2008 – A.T.L. 2 (A-Town Legends 2) (w/ Pastor Troy and Khujo)
- 2013 – Age Against the Machine (w/ Khujo, Big Gipp, and Cee-Lo Green)
- 2020 – Survival Kit (w/ Khujo, Big Gipp, and Cee-Lo Green)

=== Guest appearances ===
List of non-single guest appearances, with other performing artists, showing year released and album name
Title	Year	Other artist(s)	Album
"Mainstream"	1996	Outkast, Khujo	ATLiens
"Smooth Shit"	1998	Witchdoctor, Khujo	A S.W.A.T. Healin' Ritual
"Y'All Scared"	1998	Outkast, Big Gipp, Khujo	Aquemini
"Tequila"	1999	Kurupt, Daz, Nivea	Tha Streetz Iz a Mutha
"Gangsta Shit"	2000	Outkast, Slimm Calhoun, C-Bone	Stankonia
"Dungeon Ratz"	2001	Backbone, Khujo, Witchdoctor, Big Rube	Concrete Law
"They Comin'..."	2001	Khujo	Even in Darkness
"Yo' Side"	2001	Jawz Of Life, Tiny	First Breath
"Peace"	2002	Ekstreme	Internal Vs. Eksternal
"Here We Go"	2002	Cool Rahim	Makin Dat Cheeze
"Let's Fight"	2003	Big Gipp, Khujo	Mutant Mindframe
"Red Clay Boys"	2008	Khujo	G-Mob Godfather
"G-Mob Godfather"	2008	Khujo	G-Mob Godfather
"A Lie"	2008	Khujo	G-Mob Godfather
"Don't Care Nuthin Bout It" (Mob Remix)	2020	Khujo, Big Gipp	Echoes of a Legend
