= Ali & Gipp =

American hip hop duo

- Also known as: Kinfolk
- Origin: Southern United States
- Genre: Southern hip-hop
- Years active: 2005–2007
- Labels: Derrty Ent.; Universal Republic
- Spinoff of: St. Lunatics; Goodie Mob
- Past members: Ali; Big Gipp

Ali & Gipp was an American hip hop duo that consisted of St. Louis–based recording artist Ali Jones of St. Lunatics and Atlanta-based recording artist Big Gipp (real name Cameron Gipp) of Goodie Mob. They made their recording debut on Nelly's 2005 single "Grillz", which peaked atop the Billboard Hot 100. They released their only album, Kinfolk, on August 14, 2007 before disbanding that same year.

== Discography ==
=== Albums ===
Album information
Kinfolk
- Release Date: August 14, 2007
- Chart positions: 174
- U.S. sales: 784,331
- Last RIAA certification:

=== Singles ===
Year	Song	U.S. Hot 100	U.S. R&B	U.S. Rap	UK Singles	Album
2005	"Grillz" (Nelly featuring Paul Wall, Ali & Gipp)	1	2	1	24	Sweatsuit
2006	"Go 'Head" (featuring Chocolate Tai)	-	-	-	-	Kinfolk
2006	"Hard in da Paint" (featuring Nelly)	-	-	-	-	Kinfolk
2007	"Almost Made Ya" (featuring LeToya)	-	-	-	-	Kinfolk
