= What It Ain't (Ghetto Enuff) =

Single by Goodie Mob featuring TLC

from the album World Party
- Released: 2000
- Genre: Electro; hip hop; R&B
- Length: 5:13
- Label: LaFace
- Songwriters: Dallas Austin; Goodie Mob; Lisa "Left Eye" Lopes
- Producers: Cyptron; Dallas Austin

Goodie Mob singles chronology
| "Get Rich to This" (1999) | "What It Ain't (Ghetto Enuff)" (2000) | "Play You're Flutes" (2004) |

TLC singles chronology
| "Dear Lie" (1999) | "What It Ain't" (2000) | "Girl Talk" (2002) |

"What It Ain't (Ghetto Enuff)" is a song by American hip hop group Goodie Mob featuring American R&B girl group TLC. It was released in the spring of 2000 as the second single from Goodie Mob's third studio album, World Party (1999). The song peaked at number three on Billboard's Bubbling Under R&B/Hip-Hop Singles chart. The song was rumored to have been recorded for TLC's FanMail album, but the label deadline of the album prevented it from being added to the album at the last minute.

== Composition ==
"For us, it was like a meet-and-greet that needed to happen for the folks who was from here," Big Gipp said.

The song was later added to their compilation Dirty South Classics (2003).

== Music video ==
The video which was filmed in Atlanta in February 2000 and was directed by Dave Meyers and takes place in an arcade video game. The video (released on March 3, 2000) has all four members of the Goodie Mob teaming up with the three girls of TLC as they all find and take down an alien-type mutant with an alien slug inside of them. Khujo of Goodie Mob defeats the slug-possessed mutant and flushes it down the toilet, winning the game for the individual playing. This became the last video appearance of TLC member Lisa "Left Eye" Lopes as part of the group during her lifetime.

== Track listings ==
- CD 1
1. "What It Ain't (Ghetto Enuff)" (radio edit) (featuring TLC) — 4:25
2. "Shout" (album version) (performed by TLC) — 3:57
3. "What It Ain't (Ghetto Enuff)" (album version) (featuring TLC) — 5:13
4. "Get Rich To This" (album version) — 4:20
5. "What It Ain't (Ghetto Enuff)" (instrumental) — 5:13
- CD 2
1. "What It Ain't (Ghetto Enuff)" (radio edit) (featuring TLC) — 4:25
2. "Shout" (radio edit) (performed by TLC) — 3:57

== Charts ==
| Chart (2000) | Peak position |
|---|---|
| US Bubbling Under R&B/Hip-Hop Singles (Billboard) | 3 |
