= Still Standing (Goodie Mob album) =

1998 album by Goodie Mob

Studio album by Goodie Mob
- Released: April 7, 1998
- Recorded: July 1997 – February 1998
- Genre: Southern hip hop
- Length: 67:52
- Label: LaFace
- Producer: Organized Noize (also exec.); CeeLo Green; Craig Love; David Whild; DJ Muggs; Mr. DJ; T-Mo

Goodie Mob chronology
Soul Food (1995)	Still Standing (1998)	World Party (1999)

Singles from Still Standing
- 1. "They Don't Dance No Mo'" Released: 1998; 2. "Black Ice (Sky High)" Released: June 9, 1998

Professional ratings
Review scores
Source	Rating
AllMusic	4/5 stars
The Encyclopedia of Popular Music	4/5 stars
Los Angeles Times	3.5/4 stars
The New Rolling Stone Album Guide	3.5/5 stars
The Source	4/5 stars
USA Today	3.5/4 stars
The Village Voice	B+

Still Standing is the second studio album by American hip hop quartet Goodie Mob. It was released on April 7, 1998, through LaFace Records with distribution via Arista Records. The album was produced by Organized Noize, Mr. DJ, Craig Love, David Whild, DJ Muggs, and members CeeLo Green and T-Mo. It features guest appearances from Backbone, Chiefton, Cool Breeze, Lil' Wil, Outkast, and Witchdoctor.

The album peaked at number 6 on the Billboard 200 and number 2 on the Top R&B/Hip-Hop Albums chart in the United States, and was certified Gold by the Recording Industry Association of America on May 7, 1998. The single "Black Ice (Sky High)" peaked at number 50 on the Billboard Hot 100.

== Track listing ==
No.	Title	Writer(s)	Producer(s)	Length
1.	"The Experience"	Thomas Callaway; Organized Noize	Organized Noize	2:21
2.	"Black Ice (Sky High)" (featuring Outkast)	Cameron Gipp; André Benjamin; Antwan Patton; David Sheats	Mr. DJ	3:25
3.	"Fly Away"	Robert Barnett; Callaway; Gipp; Willie Knighton; Organized Noize	Organized Noize	4:04
4.	"The Damm" (featuring Cool Breeze)	Barnett; Callaway; Gipp; Knighton; Frederick Bell; Organized Noize	Organized Noize	4:49
5.	"They Don't Dance No Mo'" (featuring Lil' Wil)	Barnett; Callaway; Gipp; Knighton; Sheats; Organized Noize	Organized Noize; Mr. DJ	3:26
6.	"Beautiful Skin"	Barnett; Callaway; Gipp; Knighton; Craig Love	Craig Love	6:11
7.	"Gutta Butta"	Barnett; Callaway; Gipp; Knighton; Organized Noize	Organized Noize	4:49
8.	"Ghetto-ology" (featuring Chiefton)	Barnett; Callaway; Gipp; Knighton; M. Sanders	CeeLo Green	5:36
9.	"Distant Wilderness"	Barnett; Callaway; Gipp; Knighton; Organized Noize	Organized Noize	5:28
10.	"Greeny Green" (featuring Witchdoctor)	Barnett; Knighton; Eric Johnson	T-Mo	3:58
11.	"I Refuse Limitation" (featuring Backbone)	Barnett; Callaway; Gipp; Knighton; Jamahr Williams; Organized Noize	Organized Noize	6:01
12.	"See You When I See You"	Barnett; Callaway; Gipp; Knighton; Organized Noize	Organized Noize	2:29
13.	"Inshallah"	Barnett; Callaway; Gipp; Knighton; Lawrence Muggerud; Organized Noize	Organized Noize; DJ Muggs	5:03
14.	"Just About Over"	Barnett; Callaway; Gipp; Knighton; David Brown	David Whild; Organized Noize (co.)	5:26
15.	"Still Standing"	Barnett; Callaway; Gipp; Knighton; Sheats	Mr. DJ	4:52
Total length:				67:52

== Charts ==
=== Weekly charts ===
Chart (1998)	Peak position
US Billboard 200	6
US Top R&B/Hip-Hop Albums (Billboard)	2

=== Year-end charts ===
Chart (1998)	Position
US Billboard 200	155
US Top R&B/Hip-Hop Albums (Billboard)	42

== Certifications ==
Region	Certification	Certified units/sales
United States (RIAA)	Gold	500,000^{^}
^{^} Shipments figures based on certification alone.
