= DJ Speedy =

- Birth name: Harvey Miller
- Also known as: Gangsta Nerd
- Born: February 7, 1976 (age 49); Charleston, South Carolina, U.S.
- Genres: Hip hop
- Occupations: Rapper; record producer; songwriter; actor; DJ
- Instruments: Vocals; Logic; Pro Tools; drum machines; keyboards
- Years active: 1995–present
- Labels: Desert Storm; Street Family Records; Def Jam

Harvey Miller, also known as DJ Speedy (or Gangsta Nerd) is an American music producer.

Originally from Orangeburg, SC, DJ Speedy resides in Atlanta, GA.

== Music career ==
Miller acted as a mix show DJ in South Carolina. He moved to Atlanta, Georgia where he founded his own production company, Speedy Productions with his cousin.

His songs as a rapper have included parody commercials of AT&T to Fourlokos, as well as singles such as "You're a Star" featuring Shawty Redd.

DJ Speedy has partnered with the Global Good Group to become a part of the Global Good Network of people, businesses, organizations, musicians, and more dedicated to changing the world.

In 2019, Miller was held in Oklahoma after being pulled over on suspicion of drug trafficking. $149,665 in cash was seized, although no drugs were found. He was charged for having a single counterfeit $20 bill.

== Club appearances ==
- Throw Backs 2009
- Club Libra 2009
- Strokers Night Club
- Club Miami 2009/2010
- Wild Bills 2009
- Three Bears Cafe 2009
- Apache Cafe 2009
- Club Crucial 2010
- The Five Spot 2010
- Eat Andrews Cafe & Bar 2010
- Mint Lounge 2010
- Atlanta Live 2010

== Discography ==
Artist	Song details
Beyoncé	Irreplaceable Remix: Label: Music World / Sony Records
Kelly Rowland	Like This Remix Ft/ Sean Paul and Eve: Label: Music World/Sony Records
Jay-Z	Make Pimpin' Look Easy: Label: Roc-a-fella Recs/Def Jam
Nelly & Jazze PHA	Make Pimpin' Look Easy: Label: Derrty Entertainment / Universal
Young Jeezy	I Do This: Other Songs: She can get it ft TI, Skit; Label: Def Jam / Corporate Thugz: 2nd LP
Gucci Mane	Runnin Back: Other Songs: MURDER WAS THE CASE: Hot, Like a Lambo, Say Damn, Shittin Onum; Label: Big Cat / Tommy Boy Records
Murphy Lee	Work Dat, Twerk Dat: Label: Derrty Entertainment / Universal Music Group
Juicy J & DJ Paul	The Business: Label: Derrty Entertainment / Universal
Harvey Miller & Waka Flocka	Gangsta Nerd Remix: Label: Speedy Productions
Rich Boy	CELERITY: Label: Interscope Records
B.G. Life after Cash Money Records	Rolling in My Cadillac. Dorsey. 4:02: Label: Chopper City Records / Koch Records
Ali & Big Gipp ( Kin Folk)	Make Pimpin' Look Easy: Other Songs: Intro, Kinfolk, Forever, Flip Around, Somebody Move; Label: Derrty Entertainment / Universal Music Group
Melanie Melbo Smith	Outro 4:04: Label: Goodie Mob Records / Koch Records
Khujo: LUMBER JACKS	Got This: Label: Goodie Mob Records / Koch Records
Rain man	24/7/365: Label: Chime Ent / Universal Music Group
Big Boi ft B.o.B & Joi	Night Night: Label: Def Jam
Killer Mike	Follow Your Dreams: Label: Grand Hustle / Atlantic Records
OJ The Juice Man	THE OTHER SIDE OF THE TRAP: The Flyest: Other Songs: Trap Work, Good Night ft Gucci Mane, Yeah; Label: Grand Hustle / Atlantic Records
Jackie O, Chocolate Tai & Avery Storm	Flip Around: Other Songs: Anthing, Somebody Move; Label: Derrty Entertainment / Universal Music Group
Jon B	So sexy remix ft/ Paul wall: Label: Music World / Sony Records
One Monkey Don't Stop No Show	Synopsis: Other Songs: Introducing: Gator Boy, Grindin, High & Low, Big City, What You See; Label: Goodie Mob Records / Koch Record
Mutant Mind frame	Chopin through the Night. Gator: Other Songs: You Buck - We Buck, Steppin Out. Sleepy Brown, Wild OUT Slim Calhoun, All Over Your Body. 8Ball, Let't Flight Khuio T-Mo, These Times; Label: Goodie Mob Records / Koch Records
Rob Green	Ima Balla: Label: Rob Green Records

Waka Flocka Album (Triple F Life)

Get Low ft/ Nick Manji Flo Rida and Tyga

Triple F Life (Outro)
