= Soul Food (Goodie Mob album) =

1995 album by Goodie Mob

Studio album by Goodie Mob
- Released: November 7, 1995
- Recorded: October 1994–August 1995
- Studio: Curtis Mayfield’s House
- Genre: Southern hip hop
- Length: 61:02
- Labels: LaFace; Arista
- Producer: Organized Noize

Goodie Mob chronology
Soul Food (1995)	Still Standing (1998)

Singles from Soul Food
- 1. "Cell Therapy" Released: September 26, 1995; 2. "Soul Food" Released: February 26, 1996; 3. "Dirty South" Released: 1996

Soul Food is the debut album from American rap group Goodie Mob, released by LaFace Records. Its title track included the first use of the term 'dirty south' (originated by Cool Breeze), on the track of the same name. The Goodie Mob quartet includes Cee-Lo Green, Big Gipp, Khujo, and T-Mo. Guest vocalists on this album include André 3000 and Big Boi of Outkast, Cool Breeze, and Witchdoctor. In 1996, it was certified gold as sales stand at over 500,000 units in the U.S.

The album is dedicated to the memory of Sheila J. Tyler-Calloway, Green's late mother. Soul Food received critical acclaim for its raw, Southern, socially conscious lyrics and original production from Organized Noize.

== Critical reception ==
Professional ratings
Review scores
Source	Rating
AllMusic	5/5 stars
NME	7/10
RapReviews	10/10
The Rolling Stone Album Guide	4/5 stars
The Source	4/5 stars

The Sun Sentinel praised Soul Food's "head-nodding, Southern-fried funk ingredients of heart-throbbing bass and thumping drum tracks."

== Track listing ==
All tracks of the standard version of the album were produced by Organized Noize alone except "Fighting", which was produced by Mixzo and Organized Noize. Mr. DJ co-produced "Goodie Bag", although he was uncredited.

Standard Version

No.	Title	Writer(s)	Length
1.	"Free"	Thomas Callaway; Rico Wade; Ray Murray; Patrick Brown	1:23
2.	"Thought Process" (featuring André 3000)	Robert Barnett; André Benjamin; Callaway; Cameron Gipp; Willie Knighton; Wade; Murray; Brown	5:09
3.	"Red Dog (Skit)"		0:23
4.	"Dirty South" (featuring Big Boi & Cool Breeze)	King George; Antwan Patton; Wade; Murray; Brown	3:34
5.	"Cell Therapy"	Barnett; Callaway; Gipp; Knighton; Wade; Murray; Brown	4:37
6.	"Sesame Street"	Barnett; Callaway; Gipp; Knighton; Wade; Murray; Brown	4:36
7.	"Guess Who"	Robert Barnett, Thomas Callaway, Cameron Gipp, Willie Knighton, Rico Wade, Ray Murray, Patrick Brown	4:49
8.	"Serenity Prayer (Skit)"		0:09
9.	"Fighting" (featuring Joi)	Robert Barnett, Thomas Callaway, Cameron Gipp, Michael Johnson, Willie Knighton, Michael O. Johnson	5:45
10.	"Blood (Skit)"		0:53
11.	"Live at the O.M.N.I."	Robert Barnett, Thomas Callaway, Cameron Gipp, Willie Knighton, Rico Wade, Ray Murray, Patrick Brown	4:58
12.	"Goodie Bag"	Robert Barnett, Thomas Callaway, Cameron Gipp, Willie Knighton, Rico Wade, Ray Murray, Patrick Brown, David Sheats	4:25
13.	"Soul Food" (featuring Sleepy Brown)	Robert Barnett, Brandon Bennett, Marc Benno, Bill Boatman, Thomas Callaway, Cameron Gipp, Willie Knighton, Pigmeat Markham, Leon Russell, Rico Wade, Ray Murray, Patrick Brown	3:56
14.	"Funeral (Skit)"		0:54
15.	"I Didn't Ask to Come"	Robert Barnett, Thomas Callaway, Cameron Gipp, Willie Knighton, Rico Wade, Ray Murray, Patrick Brown	4:08
16.	"Rico (Skit)"		0:07
17.	"The Coming" (featuring Witchdoctor)	Robert Barnett, Thomas Callaway, Cameron Gipp, Eric Johnson, Willie Knighton, Rico Wade, Ray Murray, Patrick Brown	5:47
18.	"Cee-Lo (Skit)"		0:28
19.	"The Day After" (featuring Roni)	Robert Barnett, Thomas Callaway, Cameron Gipp, Willie Knighton, Rico Wade, Ray Murray, Patrick Brown	5:00

25th Anniversary version's additional tracks
No.	Title	Writer(s)	Length
20.	"Free (extended mix w/ rap)"	Patrick Brown, Ray Murray, Rico Wade & Thomas Callaway	4:37
21.	"Cell Therapy (Sideeq Remix)"	Rico Wade, Ray Murray, Patrick Brown, Robert Barnett, Thomas Burton, Cameron Gipp, Willie Knighton, Andre Jones	4:46
22.	"Soul Food (Crazyhouse Remix)" (ft. 8-Ball & MJG)	Patrick Brown, Ray Murray, Rico Wade, Robert Barnett, Thomas Callaway, Cameron Gipp, Willie Knighton & Brandon Bennett, Premro Smith, Marlon Goodwin	5:52
23.	"Dirty South (Remix)" (ft. Mystikal)	Patrick Brown, Ray Murray, Rico Wade, Frederick Bell, Cameron Gipp, Michael Tyler, Cedric Barnett	5:07
24.	"Free (acappella w/ rap)"	Patrick Brown, Ray Murray, Rico Wade & Thomas Callaway	4:07
25.	"Cell Therapy (acappella)"	Robert Barnett, Thomas Burton, Cameron Gipp & Willie Knighton	4:14
26.	"Soul Food (acappella)"	Robert Barnett, Thomas Callaway, Cameron Gipp, Willie Knighton & Brandon Bennett	3:51
27.	"Dirty South (acappella)" (ft. Big Boi)	Frederick Bell, Cameron Gipp & Antwan Patton	2:59

Sample credits

- "Dirty South" contains samples of "Passacaglia in C Minor" performed by Hubert Laws.

== Charts ==
=== Weekly charts ===
Chart (1995–1996)	Peak position
US Billboard 200	45
US Top R&B/Hip-Hop Albums (Billboard)	8

=== Year-end charts ===
Chart (1996)	Position
US Billboard 200	186
US Top R&B/Hip-Hop Albums (Billboard)	35

=== Singles ===
Year	Song	Peak position		
Year	Song	US Pop	US R&B	US Rap
1995	"Cell Therapy"	39	17	1
1996	"Soul Food"	64	31	7
1996	"Dirty South"	92	53	8

== Certifications ==
Region	Certification	Certified units/sales
United States (RIAA)	Gold	500,000^{^}
^{^} Shipments figures based on certification alone.
