= Age Against the Machine =

Studio album by Goodie Mob
- Released: August 27, 2013
- Recorded: 2007–2013
- Studios: Gee Jam Recording Studio (Port Antonio, Jamaica); Odds On Recording Studio (Henderson, Nevada); 17 Hertz Recording Studio (North Hollywood, California)
- Genre: Hip hop
- Length: 47:40
- Labels: The Right Records; Primary Wave; Atlantic
- Producers: Big Fraze; Cee Lo Green; Caviar; Floyd the Locsmif; The Grey Area; Get Cool; Jack Splash; Malay; Kawan "KP" Prather; OZ; QRock; Young Fyre; Zeferiah Gonzalez

Goodie Mob chronology
One Monkey Don't Stop No Show (2004)	Age Against the Machine (2013)	Survival Kit (2020)

Singles from Age Against the Machine
- 1. "Special Education" Released: June 18, 2013

Age Against the Machine is the fifth studio album by Atlanta-based hip hop group Goodie Mob. The album was released on August 27, 2013, by The Right Records, Primary Wave and Atlantic Records. The album features guest appearances from T.I., Big Rube and Janelle Monáe, among others. The album was supported by one official single— "Special Education", along with the promotional single "Fight to Win". Age Against the Machine received generally positive reviews from music critics. The album debuted at number 30 on the Billboard 200 chart, selling 13,000 copies in its first week of release.

== Background ==
The four members appeared on stage together on October 1, 2006, following a Gnarls Barkley show, stating that they were back together and on good terms. They officially announced they were working on an album and the group's reunion November 19, 2007, on Atlanta's V-103 radio station. On September 19, 2009, Goodie Mob performed for the first official reunion concert at the Masquerade in Atlanta, Georgia. In November 2010, CeeLo Green stated that the group was ten songs into the album, saying:

"We've started kind of unofficially, We've got at least ten or fifteen songs as Goodie Mob. But you know, a lot of the times when you're recording, the first few songs hardly ever get used, so we're just getting started. Now that [The] Lady Killer is done, and I'm out of that space, I can give my undivided attention to Goodie Mob and make sure that that's seen all the way through."

In June 2011, CeeLo Green stated that he would be recording a new Goodie Mob album before recording the third Gnarls Barkley album, saying:

"Let me clear this up now, that comment was made very casually I'm actually planning on completing a Goodie Mob album first, So I am working on both of them, in a very calm moderate kind of way. You know we absolutely have the creative drive to do Goodie Mob, and we already started Gnarls Barkley about a year go so I'd like to right that statement."

On July 25, 2011, Cee Lo Green announced via his Twitter that the title of the Goodie Mob reunion album would be titled We Sell Drugs Too. However, in February 2012, Cee Lo tweeted that the name has been changed to Age Against the Machine. On April 23, 2012, Goodie Mob premiered the first promotional single from the album "Fight to Win" on The Voice. Most of the recording took place in winter 2012, in Jamaica.

On April 6, 2013, it was announced that the album would be released on June 18, 2013. On May 19, 2013, Cee Lo Green announced at the Billboard Music Awards that the album's official release date would be changed to August 27, 2013. On June 4, 2013, the album cover was released. Cee Lo Green has anticipated that the album "will be a critical and commercial success because we are about to take hip-hop to a quantum leap." On June 18, 2013, the first single "Special Education" featuring Janelle Monáe was released. On July 8, 2013, the final track listing was revealed revealing 18 tracks and guest appearances on the album from T.I., Big Rube, Big Fraze, V and Janelle Monáe. On July 31, 2013, the music video was released for "I'm Set". On August 15, 2013, the music video was released for "Special Education" featuring Janelle Monáe.

== Songs ==
On June 4, 2013, in Los Angeles, Goodie Mob previewed the album for a select few. The high tempo "White Power" one of the tracks in Age Against the Machine, is depicted as "a black perspective on white power" by CeeLo Green. According to Cee Lo, a collaboration with Eminem was set to take place, but the latter artist eventually backed out of the project, apparently because of the other commitments he had made in his personal life. "Pinstripes", which is a collaboration with Atlanta-raised hip hop artist T.I., makes reference to the group's 1995 single, "Cell Therapy".

"I'm Set" and "Kolors" describe the influence of gangs in America; Gipp revealed in a promotional conference that he had ties with a handful of gangs. This provided inspiration for the track. Segregation and discrimination against certain individuals with lesser intellectual abilities is highlighted in "Special Education", a collaboration with Janelle Monáe. "Amy" deals with Cee Lo's first love affair with a white woman. Cee Lo has revealed that "Radio Killa" is tantamount to "a trailer to an action movie". "Understanding" shows how "a mistress wants to be a wife without all of the responsibility." "Father Time", which is targeted at the teenage audience, showcases how much of an impact fathers have made to their children's lives.

== Critical response ==
Professional ratings
Aggregate scores
Source	Rating
Metacritic	75/100
Review scores
Source	Rating
AllMusic	3.5/5 stars
The A.V. Club	B
The Guardian	3/5 stars
The Independent	4/5 stars
New York Daily News	4/5 stars
Paste	6.9/10
PopMatters	7/10
Rolling Stone	3/5 stars
USA Today	3.5/4 stars
XXL	(L)

Age Against the Machine was met with generally positive reviews from music critics. At Metacritic, which assigns a normalized rating out of 100 to reviews from mainstream critics, the album received an average score of 75, based on 13 reviews. At Rolling Stone, Jon Dolan said that "Cee Lo's elastic hypeness defines the original lineup's first LP since 1999." In addition, Dolan noted that "The Mob are happily out of step with 2013 hip-hop, going so far as to have nice songs about women." Andy Gill of The Independent said, "In the 14 years since World Party, Cee Lo Green has entirely overshadowed his former Goodie Mob friends, and that dynamic dominates this comeback reunion album. Which is no bad thing: whether he's blurting out a lyric about "white power" over a Moody Blues sample ("Power") or joyously remembering "my very first white girl" ("Amy"), Cee Lo burns with a fierce creative fire." Jason Lymangrover of AllMusic said, "By the end of the album, Cee Lo's presence dominates and songs start falling closer to material from The Odd Couple. Even when AATM feels like it is coming straight out of left field, it is highly entertaining." Alex Macpherson of The Guardian stated, "The 18-track culmination of a reunion that's been brewing longer than the full line-up of Goodie Mob lasted first time around, Age Against the Machine feels less like a grand comeback statement to lay the group's demons to rest and more like sweeping up forgotten odds and ends from the studio. At its best, it's a reminder of the years when, along with Outkast, the Atlanta rap four-piece set the creative pace for Southern rap."

Eric Thurm of The A.V. Club said, "Age Against The Machine takes Green's skill with the musical mainstream and gleefully showcases it in a track about interracial relationships and hiding from bigoted white fathers is evidence enough that Goodie Mob is back." Emanuel Wallace of PopMatters stated, "At times, the forward sound of Age Against the Machine has the feel of a Gnarls Barkley album, but the content is anything but that. Through and through, the subject matter here makes it all but certain that this is a Goodie Mob album. Listeners who are only familiar with Cee Lo Green as the pop singer or perhaps as a judge on The Voice will undoubtedly be in for a shock. The wide array of sounds come together in a way that makes the album whole. One of the more redeeming qualities is that the album gets more enjoyable with repeated spins, allowing the listener to pick up on minor details that may have been missed before. Although they are elder statesmen by today's hip-hop standards, Goodie Mob proves to be wise and aging with grace." Ryan Reed of Paste said, "Age Against the Machine isn't a seamless reunion—it's too messy, too bloated (18 tracks, not a single necessary interlude), too Green-centric to feel like a pure collaboration. But in a way, those Perfect Imperfections come with the territory. Even at its worst, it's a Machine built with fascinating craftsmanship."

Elysa Gardner of USA Today said, "Fourteen years after their last album, Cee Lo Green and his friends reunite, with their humor, ferocity and grooviness intact. Their playful but purposeful invention makes you laugh, dance, think and occasionally wince, but you'll walk away exhilarated." Reed Jackson of XXL stated, "Age Against The Machine can still be considered a success for its willingness to be different, which has been the mob's mantra for its entire career. Rather than being safe and returning to its roots, the mob decided to look to the future and craft an album they believed would bring something new and refreshing to the table. And in that sense, there's a lot to like here. But on the album's final track, "Father Time", which features the album's most straightforward beat, a soulful backdrop snatched straight from the '90s, Cee-Lo and the gang sound so at home that you can't help but get a little nostalgic—the innovator's dilemma." Omar Burgess of HipHopDX said, "It's nearly impossible to expect a group to be capable or interested in an exact replica of material they made almost 20 years ago. And sometimes things lean far on the outlandish side when Cee Lo is left to his own devices. But for those willing to experiment, Age Against The Machine serves as both a piece of art and a rewarding risk in an age where established artists are fearfully playing it safe." Jim Farber of the New York Daily News stated, "On "Age Against the Machine," the Mob specialize in neurotically speedy beats, head-spinning arrangements, and rapping that veers between the absurdist and the politically pointed."

== Commercial performance ==
The album debuted at number 30 on the Billboard 200 chart, with first-week sales of 13,000 copies in the United States.

== Track listing ==
No.	Title	Writer(s)	Producer(s)	Length
1.	"U Don't Know What You Got (Intro)" (featuring Big Rube)	Robert Barnett; Kenneth Gamble; Cameron Gipp; Zeferiah Gonzalez; Thomas Callaway; Willie Knighton; Jerry Ross	Zeferiah Gonzalez	1:00
2.	"State of the Art (Radio Killa)"	Barnett; Gipp; Callaway; Knighto; Claude Vasori	Cee Lo Green	2:19
3.	"Power"	Barnett; Gipp; Callaway; Justin Heyward; Knighton	The Grey Area	1:56
4.	"Silence.... The New Hate (Interlude)"			0:18
5.	"I'm Set"	Barnett; Gipp; Callaway; Knighton; David Shire	The Grey Area	3:13
6.	"Valleujah"	Barnett; Gipp; Callaway; Knighton; Jack Splash	Jack Splash	4:00
7.	"Pinstripes" (featuring T.I.)	Barnett; Gipp; Callaway; Clifford Harris, Jr.; Knighton; Willie Poole; Chad Simpson	Get Cool	4:36
8.	"Special Education" (featuring Janelle Monáe)	Barnett; Gipp; Callaway; Knighton; Tramaine Winfrey	Young Fyre; QRock	4:07
9.	"Ghost of Gloria Goodchild"	Barnett; Gipp; Callaway; Knighton; Poole	Get Cool; the Grey Area	3:13
10.	"Kolors"	Barnett; Gipp; Callaway; J. Ryan "Malay" Ho; Knighton; Kawan Prather	Malay; Kawan "KP" Prather	4:30
11.	"Come as You Are"	Barnett; Gipp; Gonzalez; Callaway; Knighton; Arie Malando	Zeferiah Gonzalez	2:48
12.	"Nexperiance"	Barnett; Gipp; Callaway; Knighton; David Richmond	The Grey Area	2:56
13.	"The Both of Me" (featuring Big Fraze)	Barnett; Gipp; Callaway; Knighton	Big Fraze	0:59
14.	"Balls (Interlude)"	Barnett; Gipp; Callaway; Knighton	Cee Lo Green	0:35
15.	"Amy" (featuring V)	Barnett; Gipp; Callaway; Knighton; Bruno Mars	The Grey Area	3:36
16.	"Understanding" (featuring V)	Barnett; Leon Douglas; Gipp; Callaway; Knighton	Floyd the Locsmif	3:43
17.	"Uncle Red's (Interlude)"	Barnett; Gipp; Callaway; Knighton	Cee Lo Green	1:03
18.	"Father Time"	Barnett; Gipp; Callaway; Knighton; Kannon Kross	Caviar; OZ	2:52

Best Buy deluxe edition bonus tracks
No.	Title	Writer(s)	Producer(s)	Length
19.	"Eye Know (She Came Home)"	Barnett; Gipp; Callaway; Knighton	Big Fraze; Cee Lo Green	4:39
20.	"Southern Girl"	Barnett; Gipp; Callaway; Knighton	Cee Lo Green	4:18

Samples

- "U Don't Know What You Got (Intro)" contains a sample of "You Don't Know What You Got Until You Lose It", as performed by Jerry Butler
- "State of the Art (Radio Killa)" contains a sample of "Metamorphose Dementielle", as performed by Caravelli
- "Power" contains a sample of "Question", as performed by the Moody Blues
- "I'm Set" contains a sample of "The Taking of Pelham 123", as performed by David Shire
- "Pinstripes" contains a sample of "War War", as performed by Mr. G
- "Come as You Are" contains a sample of "Ole Guapa", as performed by André Rieu
- "Nexperience" contains a sample of "Confunktion", as performed by David Richmond

== Personnel ==
- Leslie Brathwaite – mixing
- Josh Connolly – recording engineer
- Michael Doman – additional vocals
- Dwayne Garrett – art direction, design
- Cee Lo Green – executive producer
- Malay – recording engineer
- Graham Marsh – recording engineer, guitar, bass, drum programming
- Filip Nikolic – additional programming and instruments
- Sean Phelan – recording engineer

== Charts ==
Chart (2013)	Peak position
US Billboard 200	30
US Top R&B/Hip-Hop Albums (Billboard)	9
US Independent Albums (Billboard)	5
US Indie Store Album Sales (Billboard)	25
