= Big Gipp =

American rapper (born 1973)

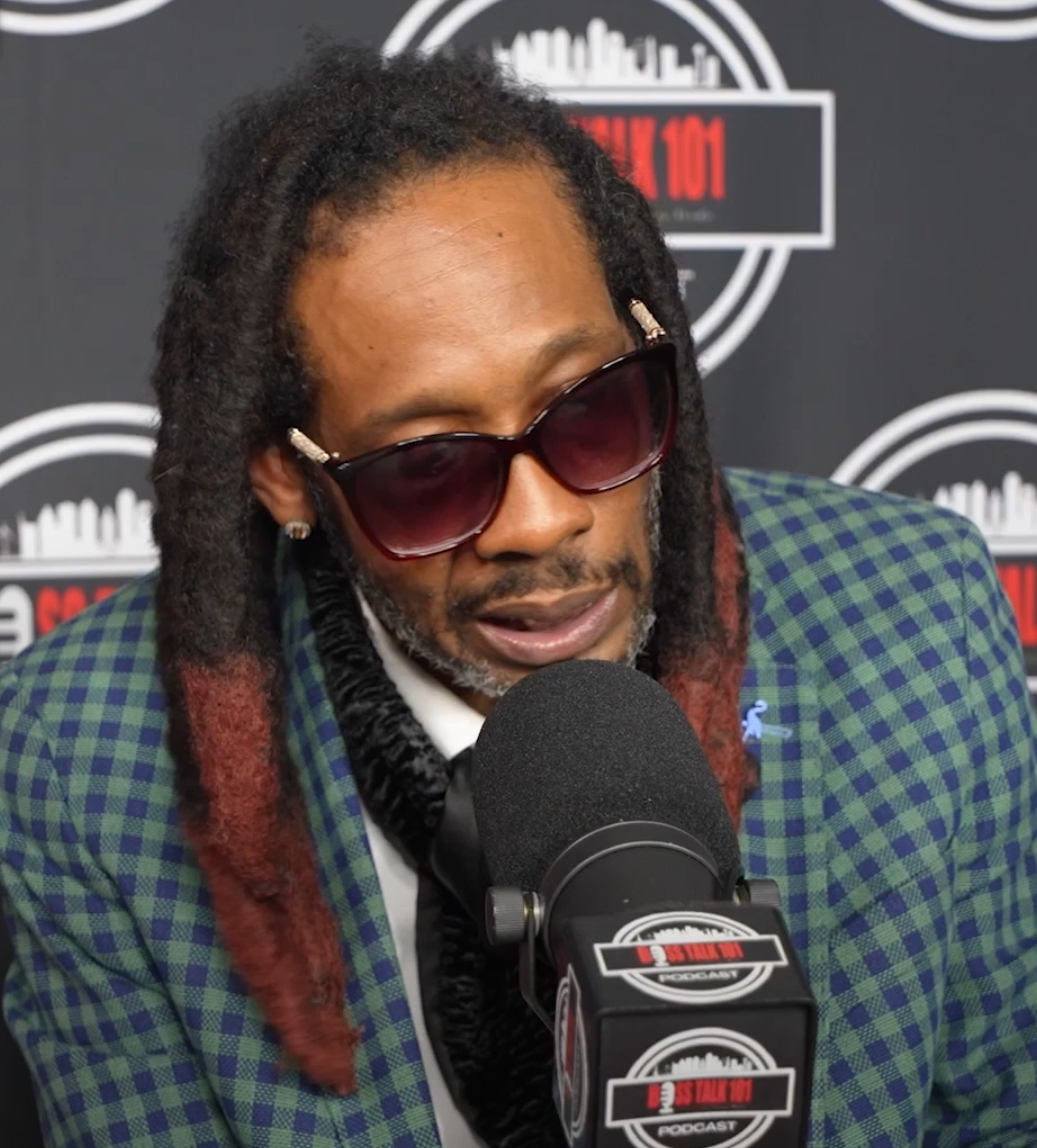
- Big Gipp in 2024

Background information
- Also known as: Gipp; Gipp Goodie
- Born: Cameron F. Gipp; April 28, 1973 (age 53)
- Origin: Atlanta, Georgia, U.S.
- Genres: Southern hip hop
- Occupation: Rapper
- Instrument: Vocals
- Years active: 1991–present
- Labels: MNRK; LaFace
- Member of: Dungeon Family; Goodie Mob
- Formerly of: Ali & Gipp
- Spouse: Joi Gilliam (m. 1995–2003)

Cameron F. Gipp (born April 28, 1973), better known by his stage name Big Gipp, is an American rapper. He is a member of the Atlanta-based hip hop group Goodie Mob, with whom he has released six studio albums, as well as the duo Ali & Gipp, with whom he has released one. He is known for his slow, drawn-out rapping dialect with political and street-life themed lyrics.

Ali & Gipp's debut studio album, Kinfolk (2007), narrowly entered the Billboard 200. Released independently, his debut solo album, Mutant Mindframe (2003), narrowly did so as well. He received a nomination for Best Rap Performance by a Duo or Group at the 49th Annual Grammy Awards for his guest appearance alongside Paul Wall and Ali on Nelly's 2005 single "Grillz", which peaked atop the Billboard Hot 100.

== Biography ==
Gipp was born into a military household on April 28, 1973 in East Point, Georgia. He graduated from Benjamin Elijah Mays High School in Atlanta. He began rapping with Khujo, T-Mo and Cee-Lo forming the Goodie Mob, a group that became part of the musical collective Dungeon Family. Gipp debuted on the song "Git Up, Git Out" from Outkast's debut album Southernplayalisticadillacmuzik in 1994. 1995 saw the release of Goodie Mob debut studio album Soul Food. Since then he participated in various Dungeon Family-related projects as one-fourth of the Goodie Mob as well as a solo artist.

After the group has released three studio albums to critical and commercial success for LaFace/Arista Records, the group left the label with each member having a chance to pursue a solo career. Gipp got signed with independent record label Koch Records to release his first solo album Mutant Mindframe in 2003. The following year, the trio of Gipp, T-Mo and Khujo reunited to release Goodie Mob's fourth studio album, One Monkey Don't Stop No Show, through Koch. Furthermore he appeared on two songs from T-Mo and Khujo album The Goodie Mob Presents: Livin' Life as Lumberjacks, which was dropped in 2005 also under Koch Records, and Goodie Mob went on hiatus.

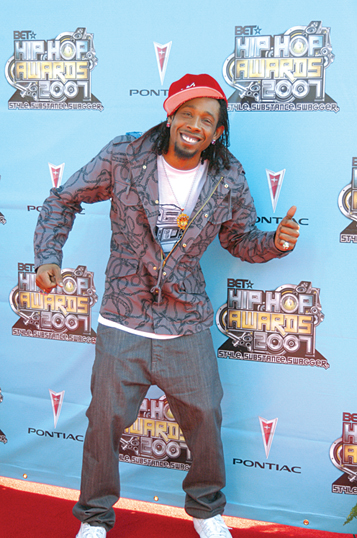
Gipp in 2007

Gipp featured on Nelly's song "Boy" from the latter's 2004 album Sweat, and the following year they collaborated on the song "Grillz", which also featured Paul Wall and Nelly's St. Lunatics groupmate Ali. The single become a number-one hit in the United States and received a Grammy Award nomination for Best Rap Performance by a Duo or Group, but lost to Chamillionaire's "Ridin' Dirty" with Krayzie Bone. This led Ali & Gipp to release a collaborative studio album Kinfolk in 2007, which made it to number 174 on the US Billboard 200.

In 2013, Goodie Mob returned as a quartet to release their fifth studio album, Age Against the Machine, for The Right Records/Primary Wave/Atlantic Records. Gipp has been announcing his sophomore solo studio album titled Zagga, but the effort was never released.

In 2020, Gipp joined forces with Daz Dillinger to release a collaborative extended play ATLA. Later that year, the foursome Goodie Mob released their sixth studio album, Survival Kit.

On February 17, 2023, Gipp together with singer/producer James Artissen released a five-track collaborative EP entitled Gipp N Worthy with the lead single "TOTW".

== Personal life ==
From 1995 to 2003, Gipp was married to singer Joi Gilliam. The couple has a daughter named Keypsiia.

== Discography ==
=== Solo albums ===
- Mutant Mindframe (2003)

=== Collaborative albums ===
- Kinfolk with Ali (2007)
- ATLA with Daz Dillinger (2020)
- Gipp N Worthy with James Artissen (2023)

=== Guest appearances ===
List of non-single guest appearances, with other performing artists, showing year released and album name
Title	Year	Other artist(s)	Album
"Decatur Psalm"	1996	Outkast, Cool Breeze	ATLiens
"4 in the Temple"	1997	Witchdoctor, Phoenix, T-Mo	...A S.W.A.T. Healin' Ritual
"Dope Stories"	1998	P.A., Pimp C	Straight No Chase
"Y'all Scared"	1998	Outkast, Lumberjacks	Aquemini
"Alright"	1999	JT Money	Pimpin' on Wax
"We've Been Trying Too Long"	1999	Solé	Skin Deep
"Whatcha Know"	2000	Three 6 Mafia	When the Smoke Clears: Sixty 6, Sixty 1
"We Servin'"	2000	—N/a	Music From and Inspired By Shaft
"Dope Stories (Remix)"	2000	P.A., Noreaga, Pimp C	My Life, Your Entertainment
"For Sale"	2000	Mack 10, YoungBloodZ, Techniec	The Paper Route
"Connect"	2000	DJ Hurricane, Pharoahe Monch, Xzibit	Don't Sleep
"Storm Chaser"	2000	Rehab, CeeLo Green	Southern Discomfort
"We Luv Deez Hoez"	2000	Outkast, Backbone	Stankonia
"Believe That"	2001	Backbone, Slimm Calhoun	Concrete Law
"Domestic Violence Pt. 2"	2001	RZA	Digital Bullet
"Bump Heads"	2001	Mr. Cheeks	John P. Kelly
"Don't Say Shit"	2001	UGK	Dirty Money
"Follow the Light"	2001	Sleepy Brown, Cee-Lo, Big Boi, Shuga Luv	Even in Darkness
"Trans DF Express"	2001	Cee-Lo, Outkast, Backbone	Even in Darkness
"Emergency"	2001	Mello, Backbone	Even in Darkness
"Hands on Yo Hipz"	2001	Thrill Da Playa	The Return of Big Bronco
"Ghetto Dream (Roll Wit Me 2K1)"	2001	Co-Ed	Utopia
"Suga Baby"	2002	CeeLo Green, Backbone	Cee-Lo Green and His Perfect Imperfections
"Keep You Chullin out the Street"	2002	Lil' Jon & The Eastside Boyz	Kings of Crunk
"Pimp Life"	2002	Too $hort, Devin the Dude, Bun B	What's My Favorite Word?
"By Myself (Remix)"	2002	DJ Kizzy Rock, Manish Man	The Realist
"I Hear Ya Talkin'"	2003	Archie Eversole	—N/a
"Tomb of the Boom"	2003	Outkast, Konkrete, Ludacris	Speakerboxxx/The Love Below
"From tha Streets"	2003	Mr. Mike, Backbone, C-Smooth	Piping Hot
"Hand Ya Hipz"	2003	Thrill Da Playa	Broamz, Chrome & Redbones
"Dirty Dirty"	2003	DJ Whoo Kid, Young Buck, Tity Boi	G-Unit Radio Part 4: No Peace Talks!
"Do What You Wanna Do"	2004	B.G., 6 Shot	Life After Cash Money
"Boy"	2004	Nelly, Lil' Flip	Sweat
"21 Gun Salute"	2004	DJ Muggs, Chace Infinite	Legends of Hip Hop
"Superfriends"	2005	Lumberjacks	The Goodie Mob Presents: Livin' Life as Lumberjacks
"24/7/365"	2005	Lumberjacks	The Goodie Mob Presents: Livin' Life as Lumberjacks
"Grillz"	2005	Nelly, Paul Wall, Ali	Sweatsuit
"Let 'Em Fight"	2005	Ali	The Longest Yard (Music From and Inspired By the Motion Picture)
"On Your Mind"	2006	Pimp C, Jagged Edge, Big Zak, Ali	Pimpalation
"Watcha Know 'Bout My Life"	2006	Da BackWudz	Wood Work
"Battle Field"	2006	8Ball, Dirt Bag	Light Up the Bomb
"Digital Experience"	2007	J. Wells	Digital Smoke
"Like Diss"	2007	Khujo Goodie, Sean Paul, Trae	Mercury
"Purse Come First"	2009	UGK	UGK 4 Life
"Passed Out"	2009	Dallas Austin Experience	8DazeAWeakend
"What Would I Do"	2014	Calvin Richardson	I Am Calvin
"Anotha Day Anotha Dolla"	2014	Scotty ATL	Spaghetti Junction
"Forty Below"	2016	Kokane, Bootsy Collins	King of GFunk
"I’ll B Gone"	2016	Cold 187um, Ice-T	The Black Godfather (Act One)
"Bang Bang G Mix"	2018	Daz Dillinger, B-Legit	Dazamataz
"Tick Tock"	2021	James Artissen	—N/a
"Intimate Privacy"	2024	James Artissen	Cups Of Koffee

== Awards and nominations ==
Year	Nominee / work	Award	Result	Ref.
2006	"Grillz"	Grammy Award for Best Rap Performance by a Duo or Group	Nominated	
