= Khujo =

American rapper (born 1972)

- Also known as: Khujo Goodie
- Born: Willie Edward Knighton Jr. March 13, 1972 (age 54); Atlanta, Georgia, U.S.
- Genres: Hip hop
- Years active: 1995–present
- Labels: Arista Records, Koch Records, Lex Records

Willie Edward Knighton Jr. (born March 13, 1972), better known as Khujo, is an American rapper. He is one-fourth of Goodie Mob (along with T-Mo, Cee-Lo, and Big Gipp), and one-half of The Lumberjacks (with T-Mo).

== Life and career ==
Khujo was born in Atlanta, Georgia. He is the only featured guest to appear on every single Outkast album, including Big Boi's solo album. Khujo has released a new book titled "Straight out the A" that focuses on his life and the development of the Dirty South movement from OutKast to Goodie Mob. Khujo is a very spiritual man known for his distinct, grunty voice and free-flowing rhyming style. He rhymes about all aspects of street life, often intertwining those subject with God metaphorically or directly. In June 2002, he was involved in a car crash that resulted in the amputation of his right leg below the knee.

He released his debut solo album, The Man Not the Dawg, in 2002.

== Discography ==
=== With Goodie Mob ===
- Soul Food (1995), LaFace Records
- Still Standing (1998), LaFace Records
- World Party (1999), LaFace Records
- One Monkey Don't Stop No Show (2004), Koch
- Age Against the Machine (2013), The Right Records

=== With The Lumberjacks ===
- Livin' Life as Lumberjacks (2005), Koch
- A.T.L. 2 (A-Town Legends 2) (The Lumberjacks & Pastor Troy) (2008) Siccness Records/ Flix

=== With Willie Isz ===
- Georgiavania (2009), Lex

=== Solo ===
- The Man Not the Dawg (2002), Street Level
- Mercury (2007), Day One Music
- G-Mob Godfather (2009)
- Echoes of a Legend (2020)
- Area 51 (2023)

=== Singles ===
- Still In Me (2021)
- Boy Stop (2022)
- Bills (2022)
- Hold On featuring (Damion Jones) (2022)
- Digital Poison (2022)
- Git Dey Azz (2023)
- Crisis (2023)
- Time To Make The Doughnuts (2023)
- Splashy (2023)
- Area 51 (2023)
- Whatever (2023)
- The Rise Of Machines with (T-Mo, Cavie) (2023)
- So High featuring James Artissen (2024)
- So High (Energy Remix) with James Artissen (2024)
- Ha Haaa with James Artissen (2024)
- All Night with James Artissen (2025)
- Whole Room Lit featuring James Artissen (2026)

=== Guest Vocals ===
- Mainstream {1996} ___ OutKast, T-Mo
- Smooth Shit {1998} ___ Witchdoctor, T-Mo
- Y'all Scared {1998} ___ OutKast, T-Mo, Big Gipp
- Problems {2000} ___ P.A., Rico Wade
- Gasoline Dreams {2000} ___ OutKast
- Crooked Booty {2001} ___ Andre 3000, Sleepy Brown, Cee-Lo
- Dungeon Rats {2001} ___ Backbone, T-Mo, Witchdoctor, Big Rube
- They Comin {2001} ___ The Lumberjacks
- Uhh Ohh {2001} ___ Lil Jon, Bo Hagon
- Calling All Zones {2003} ___ Ying Yang Twins, Hitman Sammy Sam
- Let's Fight {2003) ___ Big Gipp, T-Mo
- Reset {2003} ___ OutKast, Cee-Lo
- Corner Cuttin' {2005} ___ Gucci Mane
- N2U {2006} ___ OutKast
- Do it Big {2007} ___ stic.man
- OPR8R {2008} ___ Shape of Broad Minds
- Georgia (Remix) {2009} ___ Cunninlynguists, Killer Mike
- Tangerine {2010} ___ Big Boi, T.I.
- Still Kaps {2012} ___ JJ Doom
