= Organized Noize =

American music production team

- Origin: Atlanta, Georgia, U.S.
- Genres: Hip-hop; R&B; pop; dance-pop; electronic
- Years active: 1992–present
- Label: Organized Noize Productions
- Spinoff of: Dungeon Family
- Members: Sleepy Brown; Ray Murray
- Past members: Rico Wade
- Website: organizednoize.net

Organized Noize is an American production duo from Atlanta, Georgia, currently composed of Ray Murray and Sleepy Brown. Initially a trio, the team included Dungeon Family co-founder Rico Wade until his death in 2024.

== History ==
Among the hit records they have worked on include TLC's "Waterfalls", En Vogue's "Don't Let Go (Love)", and Ludacris' "Saturday (Oooh! Ooooh!)". They are most notable for producing a large amount of material for Outkast (including all of Southernplayalisticadillacmuzik and "So Fresh, So Clean" from Stankonia) and Goodie Mob (including all of Soul Food and "They Don't Dance No Mo" from Still Standing). Both groups are part of Organized Noize's Dungeon Family collective, which also includes Slimm Cutta Calhoun and Joi, among others. The "Dungeon" would be the name given to recording studio which was located in the basement of Organized Noize member Rico Wade's mother's house. The "Dungeon" studio, which attracted numerous aspiring musicians and artists, even made Wade a key architect of Atlanta hip-hop. In an interview with Billboard, Big Boi of Outkast explained that Organized Noize helped them early on in the music business, saying, "They were our big brothers, and they did a production deal with LaFace Records. They were the ones that gave us our first shot and we been doing music with them since the beginning."

They also contributed on the soundtrack of the 1996 critically acclaimed heist film Set It Off. In 2006, they contributed additional music to the film Miami Vice. In 2010 they produced several songs on the critically acclaimed Island/Def Jam solo debut from Big Boi titled Sir Lucious Left Foot: The Son of Chico Dusty. In 2011, they produced the album Nappy Dot Org for Nappy Roots.

The documentary feature The Art of Organized Noize premiered on Netflix on March 22, 2016. The documentary, directed by Quincy Jones III, details the formation of the group, who met through Tionne Watkins of TLC, and the early days of their Dungeon Family collective.

On May 5, 2017, Organized Noize released an eponymous, seven-song EP, which had been in production for over 20 years. Ahead of the official EP release, the track "Kush" was released on April 20, 2017. The project was generally well-received, with Cult MTL writer Mr. Wavvy calling it "an enjoyable listen for any fans of the original Dungeon Family/Dirty South movement."

Rico Wade was the older cousin of Grammy winning rapper Future. He died on April 13, 2024, at the age of 52 of heart failure. Wade was considered to be the "cornerstone" of not only Organized Noize, but also its collaborative group Dungeon Family.

== Impact ==
Organized Noize are credited with jumpstarting the rise of Southern hip-hop in the early-to-mid 1990s. The group has been described as being, "the...production team behind some of the greatest songs ever," and "one of the most respected production teams in rap history," by NPR and Spin respectively. Billboard has stated that Organized Noize "pioneered the Dirty South sound."

== Production discography ==
=== Studio albums ===
List of albums, with selected chart positions
Title	Album details	Peak chart positions	
Title	Album details	US	USR&B/HH
Southernplayalisticadillacmuzik (Outkast)	Released: April 26, 1994; Label: LaFace, Arista, RCA; Format: CD, LP, Cassette, digital download	20	2
ATLiens (Outkast)	Released: August 27, 1996; Label: LaFace, Arista, RCA; Format: CD, LP, Cassette, digital download	2	1
Aquemini (Outkast)	Released: September 29, 1998; Label: LaFace, Arista, RCA; Format: CD, LP, Cassette, digital download	2	2
Stankonia (Outkast)	Released: October 31, 2000; Label: LaFace, Arista, RCA; Format: CD, LP, Cassette, digital download	2	2
Boomiverse (Big Boi)	Released: 2017; Label: Organized Noize Productions; Format: Digital Download/Streaming	2	2
Organized Noize EP	Released: May 5, 2017; Label: Organized Noize Productions; Format: Digital Download/Streaming	-	-
"—" denotes a recording that did not chart or was not released in that territory.

== Credits ==
Year	Artist	Song title	Album title
1992	TLC	What About Your Friends (Jazz Remix)	N/A
1993	TLC	Sleigh Ride	A LaFace Family Christmas
1993	Shug & Dap	Another Man (Remix)	N/A
1993	Xscape	With You; Tonight	Hummin' Comin' at Cha
1993	P.A.	Lifeline	CB4 (OST)
1993	P.A.	Entire Album	Ghetto Street Funk
1994	OutKast	Entire Album	Southernplayalisticcadillacmuzik
1994	TLC	Waterfalls; Somethin Wicked This Way Comes; Waterfalls (ONP Remix)	CrazySexyCool
1994	Sounds of Blackness	Black Butterfly (Organized Noise Remix)	N/A
1994	A Few Good Men	A Lil' Somethin' (Da' ONP Playa Mix)	N/A
1995	OutKast	Phobia	Higher Learning OST
1995	OutKast	Benz or a Beamer	New Jersey Drive OST
1995	Pebbles	Happy; Soul Replacement; Show Me	Straight From My Heart
1995	Speech	Like Marvin Gaye Said (What's Going On) (Organized Noize Mix)	N/A
1995	Goodie Mob	Entire Album	Soul Food
1995	Wessyde Goon Squad	Crazy (Remix Edit)	N/A
1995	The Hard Boyz	Thin Ice	Underground Hitz
1995	Xscape	Keep It on the Real	Off the Hook
1996	Organized Noize, Queen Latifah	Set It Off	Set It Off OST
1996	En Vogue	Don't Let Go	Set It Off OST
1996	Goodie Mobb	Angelic Wars	Set It Off OST
1996	Goodie Mobb	Blood	America Is Dying Slowly
1996	Goodie Mobb	Remember What I Said	Fled OST
1996	Curtis Mayfield	Ms. Martha; Here But I'm Gone	New World Order
1996	Mista	Entire Album	Mista
1996	OutKast	Entire Album {except 3, 4, 6, 7, 13}	ATLiens
1997	SWV	Tell Me How You Want It {co-produced by Marvin “Chanz” Parkman}	Money Talks OST
1997	Billy Lawrence	Paradise	Paradise
1997	4.0	Can I Spend the Night	4.0
1997	Cool Breeze, Big Boi	Gangsta Partna {co-produced by Mr. DJ}	Hoodlum OST
1998	Witchdoctor	Entire Album {except 2, 4, 9}	A S.W.A.T. Healin' Ritual
1998	PA	The Lick	Straight No Chase
1998	Lil Will	Lookin for Nikki (ONP Remix)	N/A
1998	Goodie Mob	The Experience; Fly Away; The Damm; They Don't Dance No Mo {co-produced by Mr. DJ}; Gutta Butte; Distant Wilderness; I Refuse Limitation; See You When I See You; Inshallah {co-produced by DJ Muggs}; Just about Over {co-produced by David Whild}	Still Standing
1998	Eric Clapton	Pilgrim (Remix)	N/A
1998	OutKast	Return of the G; Skew It on the Bar-B; West Savannah; Mamacita	Aquemini
1999	Curtis Mayfield	Here But I'm Gone Pt. II	Mod Music
1999	UGK, Smitty	Belts to Match	The Wood OST
1999	Kurupt	I Call Shots; Tequila	Tha Streetz Iz a Motha
1999	Cool Breeze	Whole Album (except 10, 13, 16)	East Point's Greatest Hits
1999	Jim Crow	Crow 5	Crow's Nest
1999	Macy Gray	Do Something (ONP Remix)	Music of the Heart: The Album
1999	YoungBloodz, Backbone, BoneCrusher	Hot Heat	Against da Grain
1999	Goodie Mobb	Hat Low	The PJs OST
1999	Goodie Mobb	World Party; Get Rich to This; I.C.U.; Street Corner; Cuddy Buddy	World Party
2000	Various	One Four Love (Pt 1 & 2)	Hip Hop for Respect
2000	Sleepy Brown	Automatic	Shaft OST
2000	Terrell	Grant's Tomb	Uptown International
2000	PA	Problems	My Life Your Entertainment
2000	Ludacris	Game Got Switched	Back for the First Time
2000	OutKast	So Fresh So Clean; Spaghetti Junction; We Love Deez Hoes	Stankonia
2001	Nivea	Don't Mess With the Radio {co-produced by Swift C}	Nivea
2001	Backbone	Concrete Law; 5-Duce, 4-Tre; Hit & Run; Lord Have Mercy; Dungeon Ratz; Sho Ya Right; Yes Yes Y'all	Concrete Law
2001	Bubba Sparxxx	All the Same; Bubba Sparxxx	Dark Days, Bright Nights
2001	Slimm Calhoun	Piece of tha Pie	The Skinny
2001	Ludacris	She Said; Saturday (Ooh Ooh)	Word of Mouf
2001	Dungeon Family	Entire Album {except 1, 2, 5, 11}	Even in Darkness
	Joi	It's Your Life	Star Kitty's Revenge
2002	The Calhouns	Outfits; Street Life; Some People	Made in the Dirdy South
2002	Bone-Thugs-n-Harmony	Guess Who's Back	Thug World Order
2002	TLC	Give It to Me While It's Hot; Get Away	3D
2003	Roscoe	What I Look Like; Head 2 Toe; I Call Shots Pt. II	Young Roscoe Philaphornia
2003	The D.O.C.	DFW	Deuce
2003	Thrill da Playa, Big Rube	Anyone I Forgot	Broamz, Chrome and Redbones
2003	Bubba Sparxxx	Like It or Not; New South; Back in the Mud	Deliverance
2004	Sleepy Brown, OutKast	I Can't Wait	Barbershop 2 OST
2004	Cee Lo Green	Childz Play; Scrapmetal	Cee-Lo Green Is the Soul Machine
2004	Brandy	Necessary	Afrodisiac
2004	Ludacris	Blueberry Yum Yum	Red Light District
2005	Trey Songz	Comin for You	I Gotta Make It
2005	Big Boi, Killer Mike, Bubba Sparxxx	Oh No	XxX: SOTU OST
2005	Bubba Sparxxx, Killer Mike, Cool Breeze	Claremont Lounge	Got Purp? vol. 2
2005	Goodie Mobb	Hold On	Got Purp? vol. 2
2005	The Lumberjacks	Murder Madness Music; Gothic Funk; They Comin Man; Superfriends	Livin Life As Lumberjacks
2005	Earth, Wind & Fire	This Is How I Feel; The One	Illumination
2006	Bubba Sparxx	Represent; Claremont Lounge; Wonderful; As the Rim Spins; The Other Man	The Charm
2006	Cee-Lo	Ophidiophobia	Snakes on a Plane OST
2006	OutKast	Mighty O; N2U; Peaches; Life Is Like a Musical; In Your Dreams	Idlewild
2006	Da Backwudz	Mama Always Told Me	Wood Work
2010	Big Boi	Turns Me On; For Yo Sorrows; The Train Part II; Back-up Plan	Sir Lucious Left Foot
2012	Big Boi	Lines	Vicious Lies and Dangerous Rumors
2014	Future, Andre 3000	Benz Friendz (Whatchutola) {co-produced by Mr. DJ}	Honest
2017	OverDoz.	Manifesto	2008
2017	Big K.R.I.T., UGK	Ride Wit Me {co-produced by Cory Mo}	4eva Is a Mighty Long Time
2018	Janelle Monae	I Like That	Dirty Computer
2022	Ari Lennox	Outside {co-produced by Elite}	A/S/L
2026	T.I.	Represent a Time	Kill the King
