= Dungeon Family =

American musical collective

The Dungeon Family
- Origin: Atlanta, Georgia, U.S.
- Genres: Southern hip-hop; R&B
- Years active: 1991–2024
- Label: Arista
- Past members: Outkast; TLC; Future; Big Rube; Goodie Mob (including CeeLo Green); Cool Breeze; Janelle Monae; Tito Lopez; Konkrete; Organized Noize (including Sleepy Brown); Joi; Killer Mike; Witchdoctor; Backbone; Bubba Sparxxx

The Dungeon Family are a musical collective based in Atlanta that specialized in Southern hip-hop with heavy funk and soul influences. Members of this collective recorded music, and had their career emerge, from Rico Wade's basement recording studio in East Point, Georgia, which was known as the "Dungeon".

== History ==
The group derives its name from "The Dungeon", the name given to record producer Rico Wade's studio, located in the basement of his mother's house, where many of the early members of the collective did their first recordings. Rico Wade, Ray Murray, and Sleepy Brown constitute the production/songwriting team Organized Noize, who have produced hits for the main popular Dungeon Family groups Outkast, TLC, and Goodie Mob. Numerous aspiring musicians and artists emerged from the "Dungeon," with Wade even considered to be an originator of Atlanta hip-hop.

The collective released their only album together, titled Even in Darkness, under Arista Records on November 20, 2001.

On October 7, 2011, it was announced that Arista, along with Jive and J Records, would be shut down. All artists on those labels, including The Dungeon Family, were moved to RCA Records. Because of this, the collective decided to part ways with RCA's parent, Sony Music.

On April 13, 2024, Dungeon Family leader Rico Wade died.

== In visual media ==
On March 16, 2016, the documentary The Art of Organized Noize premiered on Netflix.

== Members ==
1st generation

- Organized Noize
  - Rico Wade
  - Sleepy Brown
  - Ray Murray
- Outkast
  - Big Boi
  - André 3000
- Earthtone III
  - Big Boi
  - André 3000
  - Mr. DJ
- Goodie Mob
  - Big Gipp
  - T-Mo
  - CeeLo Green
  - Khujo
- Parental Advisory
  - Mello
  - K.P.
  - Big Reese
- Lumberjacks
  - T-Mo
  - Khujo
- Society of Soul
  - Sleepy Brown
  - Roni
  - Big Rube
  - Ray Murray
  - Rico Wade
- Sleepy's Theme
  - Sleepy Brown
  - Eddie Stokes
  - Victor Alexander
- Joi
- Witchdoctor
- Cool Breeze
- Backbone
- Debra Killings

- Slimm Calhoun

2nd generation

- Killer Mike
- Tito Lopez
- The Calhouns
  - Slimm Calhoun
  - Lucky Calhoun
  - Pauly Calhoun
- Konkrete
  - BlackOwned C-Bone
  - Lil' Brotha
  - Supa Nate
- Purple Ribbon All-Stars
  - Killer Mike
  - Konkrete
  - Vonnegutt
  - TJG
  - Janelle Monáe
  - Scar
  - Bubba Sparxxx
- Sniper Unit
  - Big L (Pauly Calhoun)
  - Swift C (Lucky Calhoun)
- Da Connect
  - Meathead (Future)
  - Infinique
  - Boulevard Intl.
  - G-Rock
  - C-Smooth
  - Rico Wade
- ChamDon
  - G-Rock
  - C-Smooth

== Discography ==
Studio albums

- Even in Darkness (2001)

Singles

- "Trans DF Express"
- "6 Minutes (Dungeon Family It's On)"
