= Big Rube =

American rapper

- Born: September 27, 1969 (age 56)
- Origin: Atlanta, Georgia, U.S.
- Genres: Spoken word; hip hop
- Years active: 1992–present
- Label: LaFace Records

Ruben Bailey (born September 27, 1969, Atlanta, Georgia), professionally known by his stage name Big Rube, is an American spoken word artist, rapper and hip hop producer. He is a first-generation member of the Dungeon Family and of Society of Soul. He is known for his spoken word intros and interludes on many albums by fellow members and affiliates of the Dungeon Family, including Outkast, Goodie Mob, Killer Mike, Future, Witchdoctor and Bubba Sparxxx. He has also contributed his spoken word poetry to Russell Simmons' Def Poetry Jam and the motion picture ATL. He appears on the Outkast songs "13th Floor/Growing Old" and "Liberation" as well as the CeeLo Green song “Scrap Metal”.

In 1996, he appeared on the Red Hot Organization's compilation CD, America Is Dying Slowly, alongside Biz Markie, Coolio and Fat Joe, among many other prominent hip hop artists. The CD, meant to raise awareness of the AIDS epidemic among African American men, was heralded as "a masterpiece" by The Source magazine.

In later years, Big Rube has made a couple of appearances on recent albums by members of the Dungeon Family. He appeared on the song "General Patton" on Big Boi's 2010 solo debut Sir Lucious Left Foot: The Son of Chico Dusty and on the intro track "The Future Is Now" on Future's debut Pluto. Rube also appeared on the 2013 reunion album from the Goodie Mob, Age Against the Machine.

On rare occasions, Rube appears on non-Dungeon Family related projects. He has appeared on Lina's 2005 album The Inner Beauty Movement, on Rapsody's 2012 debut The Idea of Beautiful, on Denzel Curry's double EP 32 Zel/Planet Shrooms, and on two songs (“Establishing Shot” and “‘Til The Lights Go Out”) from Toronto rapper The Mighty Rhino's 2018 album We Will No Longer Retreat Into Darkness (this latter song also featuring Witchdoctor), as well as on albums by Truth Hurts, CunninLynguists, Jarren Benton, and Memphis rap group Eightball & MJG. Big Rube was featured on The Internet's record Hive Mind, with the track "It Gets Better (With Time)". Most recently, Big Rube appeared on Spillage Village's 2020 album Spilligion on the tracks "Spill Vill" and "Hapi", and on Grip's 2021 album I Died for This!? on the track "Enem3?".

== Discography ==
- Brainchild (1995)
