= Goodie Mob =

American hip-hop group

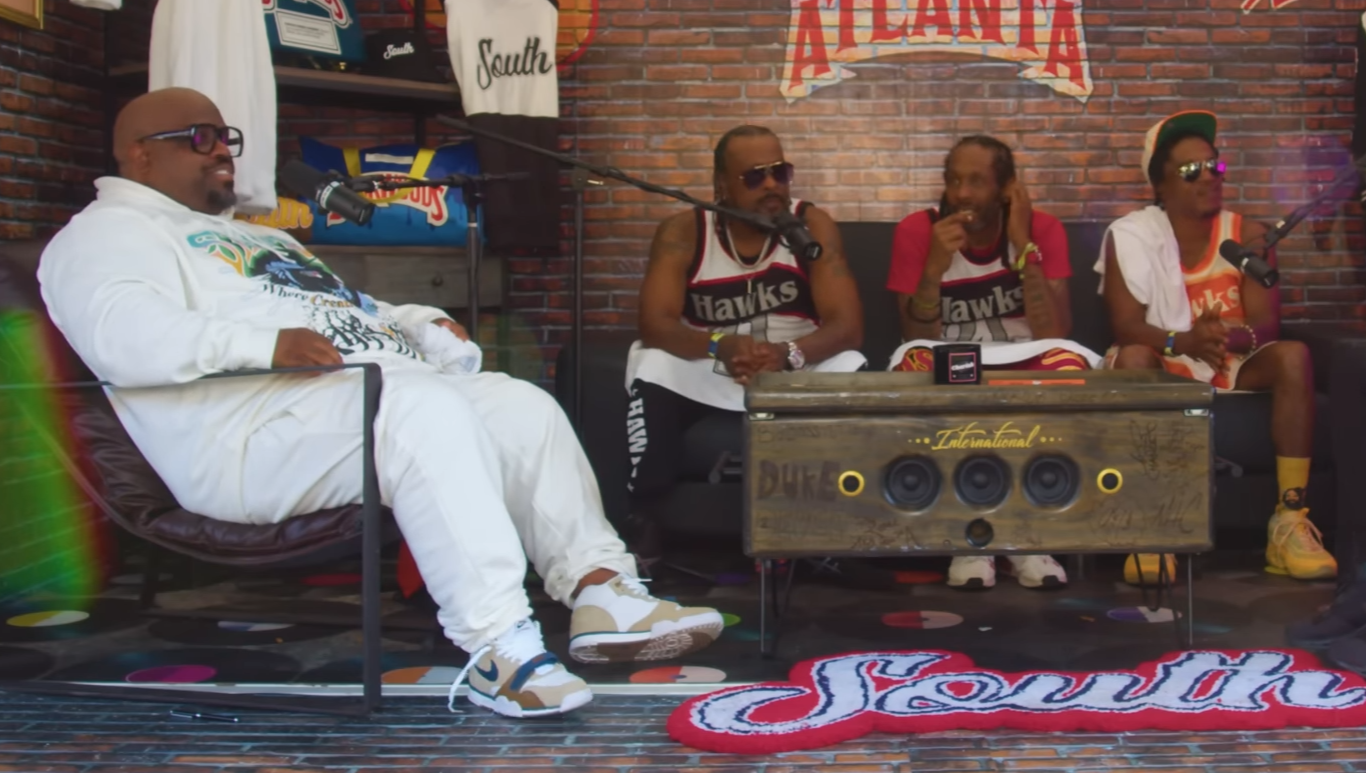
- Goodie Mob in 2024. From left to right: CeeLo Green, Khujo, Big Gipp and T-Mo

Background information
- Also known as: Goodie Mo-B
- Origin: Atlanta, Georgia, U.S.
- Genres: Southern hip-hop
- Years active: 1991–present
- Labels: Primary Wave; E1; Atlantic; LaFace; Arista; BMG; Elektra
- Spinoffs: Dungeon Family; Lumberjacks; Gnarls Barkley; Ali & Gipp
- Members: Big Gipp; Khujo; CeeLo Green; T-Mo

Goodie Mob is an American hip-hop group based in Atlanta, Georgia, consisting of CeeLo Green, Khujo, T-Mo, and Big Gipp.

== History ==
The group was formed in 1991 by Cameron "Big Gipp" Gipp, Willie "Khujo" Knighton Jr., CeeLo Green (born Thomas Callaway), and Robert "T-Mo" Barnett in Atlanta, Georgia. In 1995, Goodie Mob released their debut album, Soul Food, which was critically acclaimed and certified Gold. The album aired social and political issues such as racism, discrimination, geopolitics, and gentrification. Their debut single "Cell Therapy" reached number 39 on the Billboard Hot 100 and also topped the Billboard Hot Rap Singles chart. Goodie Mob is part of the hip-hop/R&B musical collective, Dungeon Family, also based in Atlanta. Like numerous musicians in Atlanta's hip-hop scene, their career would in fact emerge from the so-called "Dungeon," the name given to the recording studio which was located in the basement of Rico Wade's mother.

In 1998, Goodie Mob released their second album, Still Standing. The album continued the group's style of social commentary, and CeeLo's singing talents were used more frequently. The group's third album, World Party, veered away from their gritty style and instead incorporated lighter beats and party related subject matter. During its production, CeeLo left the group to pursue a solo career when he was unhappy with the project's direction. Goodie Mob's fourth album, One Monkey Don't Stop No Show, was released in 2004 and suffered a poor reception, resulting in Big Gipp also leaving the group. T-Mo and Khujo formed the duo Lumberjacks, which they released the album Livin' Life as Lumberjacks in 2005. Big Gipp, as part of the duo Ali & Gipp, released their album Kinfolk in 2006.

Also in 2006, all four members of Goodie Mob performed together following a Gnarls Barkley concert, marking the group's reunion. In 2011, Goodie Mob signed with Elektra Records and worked on a new album, which would eventually become Age Against the Machine, released in 2013.

After a seven years gap, they released a new album Survival Kit in November 2020.

=== Recent history ===
On August 19, 2008, Goodie Mob performed on stage together unannounced at the Tabernacle in Atlanta during a free Nelly concert.

On September 19, 2009, Goodie Mob performed for the first official reunion concert at the Masquerade in Atlanta, Georgia. The group also performed with all the original members at the Smoke Out festival in San Bernardino, California, on October 23, 2009.

As of 2011, Goodie Mob is signed with Elektra Records.

On March 12, 2010, Goodie Mob performed "Get Rich to This" in Las Vegas, Nevada, for part of the Red Bull Soundclash concert that featured CeeLo.

On April 28, 2011, CeeLo brought out Goodie Mob during his performance at Sunfest in West Palm Beach, Florida. The group performed four songs together, including "Black Ice (Sky High)", "Cell Therapy", and "Soul Food".

On July 25, 2011, CeeLo announced via his Twitter that Goodie Mob's reunion album would be titled We Sell Drugs Too. However, in February 2012 CeeLo tweeted that the name has been changed to Age Against the Machine.

In 2015, a supporters group for Atlanta United, "Footie Mob" used the music group's name as inspiration.

After Survival Kit was released on November 13, 2020, the group planned to start touring in December 2020.

== Filmography ==
=== Films ===
- Mystery Men (1999)

=== Music videos ===
- Git Up, Git Out (1994)
- Give It 2 You (1995)
- What It Ain't (2000)
- So Fresh, So Clean (2001)
- Dungeon Family - Trans DF Express (2001)
- Special Education (2013)

=== Television ===
- The 10th Annual Soul Train Music Awards (1996)
- Red Hot & Rap (1996)
- Teen Summit (1998)
- Sister, Sister (1998)
- The 1999 Source Hip-Hop Music Awards (1999)
- Soul Train (1996-2000), 3 episodes
- 14th Annual Soul Train Music Awards (2000)
- Showtime at the Apollo (2000)
- The 2012 Billboard Music Awards (2012)
- Unsung (2020)

== Discography ==
Studio albums

- Soul Food (1995)
- Still Standing (1998)
- World Party (1999)
- One Monkey Don't Stop No Show (2004)
- Age Against the Machine (2013)
- Survival Kit (2020)
