= List of songs about Atlanta =

This is a list of songs about the city of Atlanta, Georgia.

- "Preachin' the Blues" by Bessie Smith
- "Atlanta, G.A.", pop/big band song written by Sunny Skylar and Artie Shaftel 1945
- "Atlanta Song", by David Allan Coe, The Mysterious Rhinestone Cowboy, 1974
- "Atlanta Blues (Make Me One Pallet On Your Floor)" by Eartha Kitt from "St. Louis Blues" 1958
- "Hot 'Lanta" (instrumental) by The Allman Brothers Band, from At Fillmore East 1971
- “Atlanta” by Tony Orlando and Dawn, 1973
- "Midnight Train to Georgia” by Gladys Knight & The Pips, 1973
- "Doraville" by Southern rock band Atlanta Rhythm Section, from Third Annual Pipe Dream 1974
- "Oh Atlanta" by L.A. band Little Feat, from Feats Don't Fail Me Now 1974
- "Rock'n Me" by Steve Miller Band ("Philadelphia, Atlanta, L.A.") 1976
- "Atlanta June" by Pablo Cruise from A Place in the Sun 1977
- "I'm the Only Hell (Mama Ever Raised)" by Johnny Paycheck, from Slide Off of Your Satin Sheets 1977
- "Atlanta's Burning Down" by Dickey Betts (of The Allman Brothers) from Atlanta's Burning Down, Southern rock 1978
- "Oh, Atlanta" by British hard rock band Bad Company, from Desolation Angels 1979; also covered by Alison Krauss
- "Atlanta Lady (Something About Your Love)" by Marty Balin (of Jefferson Airplane), 1981
- "Atlanta Burned Again Last Night" by country group Atlanta, from Pictures 1983
- “Atlanta That’s Where I Stay” by MC Shy D, Spoken word 1987
- "Badstreet U.S.A" by Michael Hayes (wrestler) 1987
- "Girls, Girls, Girls" by Mötley Crüe, ("rockin' in Atlanta at Tattletales") 1987
- "200 More Miles" by Canadian band Cowboy Junkies, from The Trinity Session 1988
- "Love Shack" by Athens band The B-52's, from Cosmic Thing ("headin' down the Atlanta highway"), a reference to nearby Athens, dance-rock, (#3 on Billboard Hot 100 in 1989)
- “Cabbagetown” by They Might Be Giants from I Palindrome I, 1992: Cabbagetown is a neighborhood in Atlanta.
- “Going Back To Georgia” by Nanci Griffith ft. Adam Duritz from Flyer, 1994
- "Going to Georgia" by The Mountain Goats from Zopilote Machine, 1994
- "Southernplayalisticadillacmuzik" by Outkast, Southern hip hop 1994
- "Dirty South" by Goodie Mob 1995
- “ATLiens” by OutKast from “ATLiens” 1996
- "Elevators" by OutKast from “ATLiens” 1996
- “My Boo” by Ghost Town DJ's, 1996 (References Atlanta slang)
- “Lookin’ 4 Nikki” by Lil' Will, 1998 (References an Atlanta strip club)
- “85” by YoungBloodZ, 1999
- "Atlanta" by Stone Temple Pilots, from No. 4 1999
- "Neon" by John Mayer, bluesy song mentions Peachtree Street, from Room for Squares 2001, and Inside Wants Out
- "ATL Eternally" (featuring Pastor Troy and Lil Jon & the Eastside Boyz) from Alley: The Return of the Ying Yang Twins 2002
- "ATL Hoe" by Baby D, Pastor Troy, Archie and Lil Jon 2002
- "Welcome to Atlanta" by Jermaine Dupri and Ludacris, from Word of Mouf and Instructions (#3 on Billboard Hot Rap Singles) 2002
- "F.I.L.A (Forever I Love Atlanta)" by Lil Scrappy feat. Lil Jon crunk, 2004
- "Oh" by Ciara feat. Ludacris ("Adamsville, Bankhead, College Park"), (#2 on Billboard Hot 100), 2005
- "Georgia" by Field Mob and Ludacris ft. Jamie Foxx (as Ray Charles), from Disturbing tha Peace 2005
- “Kryptonite (I’m On It)” by Purple Ribbon All-Stars, 2005
- "ATL" by Freak Nasty, (rap, Miami bass), 2006
- "Ride wit Me" by T.I. 2006
- "Bad Education" by Tilly and the Wall 2006
- "ATL" alt. rock song by Butch Walker, from Sycamore Meadows 2008
- "One More Drink" by Ludacris ft. T-Pain, from Theater of the Mind hip hop and R&B, (#4 Hot Rap Songs), 2008
- "Atlanta, GA" by Shawty Lo (of D4L, d.2016) featuring The-Dream, Ludacris and Gucci Mane), 2010
- “Atlanta Zoo” by Gucci Mane ft. Ludacris, 2010
- "Communicating Doors" by The Extra Lens (From Undercard), 2010
- “Straight Outta Dunwoody” by Dormtainment, 2011
- "Atlanta" by Ron Pope (from Atlanta), 2012
- “All Gold Everything” by Trinidad James, 2012
- “In the A” by Big Boi ft. T.I. & Ludacris, 2012
- "New Atlanta" by Migos ft. Jermaine Dupri, Young Thug and Rich Homie Quan from No Label 2, trap music, 2014
- "East Atlanta Day" by Zaytoven featuring Gucci Mane and 21 Savage
- "Panda" by Desiigner (not from ATL), from New English (mixtape), ("I got broads in Atlanta"), 2016
- "Havana" by Camila Cabello ft. Young Thug ("he took me back to East Atlanta") (#1 on Billboard Hot 100), 2017-2018
- "East Atlanta Love Letter" by 6lack ft. Future (rapper), from East Atlanta Love Letter 2018
- "Butterfly Effect" by Travis Scott album Astroworld (“Fly the broads, fly the dogs down to Atlanta, yeah”), 2018
- "1000 Nights" by Ed Sheeran feat. Meek Mill & A Boogie Wit Da Hoodie (they aren't from ATL), from No. 6 Collaborations Project, ("Last night I played a show in Atlanta; Husbands and wives, daddies and daughters with their cameras"), 2019
- "Moon over Georgia" by Shenandoah (band)
- "Atlanta" by Atlanta born singer/songwriter Bill Rowen
- "Down in Atlanta" by Pharell Williams, Travis Scott
