= Embrace =

Embrace may refer to:

- A hug, a form of physical intimacy
- Acceptance

== Art ==
- Embrace (sculpture), an abstract art work by Sorel Etrog installed near Milwaukee, Wisconsin
- The Embrace, a statue commemorating Martin Luther King Jr. and Coretta Scott King in Boston, Massachusetts

== Books and movies ==
- Embrace (film), a 2016 Australian documentary about women's body image
- Embrace (novel), a 2001 novel by Mark Behr
- Embrace Again, a 2021 Chinese romance film

== Healthcare ==
- Embrace (non-profit), an organization that distributes a low-cost infant incubator developed at Stanford University
- EMBRACE Healthcare Reform Plan, a proposal for healthcare in the United States first published in 2009

== Music ==
=== Bands ===
- Embrace (American band), a post-hardcore band from Washington, D.C.
- Embrace (English band), a post-Britpop band from West Yorkshire
- Embrace (duo), a Danish sister duo who won season 9 of the Danish version of The X Factor
- Embrace Today, an American former straight-edge metalcore–hardcore punk band
- Embraced, a Swedish melodic black metal band

=== Albums ===
- Embrace (American band Embrace album), 1987 album by American band Embrace
- Embrace (Boom Boom Satellites album), 2013 album by Japanese band Boom Boom Satellites
- Embrace (Endorphin album), 1998 album by Australian band Endorphin
- Embrace (English band Embrace album), 2014 album by English band Embrace
- Embrace (Armin van Buuren album), 2015 album by Dutch electronic musician Armin van Buuren
- Embrace (Roswell Rudd, Fay Victor, Lafayette Harris, and Ken Filiano album), 2017 album
- Embrace, 2004 album by American jazz saxophonist Dave Pietro
- Embrace, 2002 Hindi-language album by German musician Deva Premal, vocals by Jai Uttal
- Embrace, 2002 English-language album by German trance group Fragma
- Embrace, 2003 album by American jazz saxophonist Najee
- Embrace, 2008 EP by Australian dance duo Pnau
- Embrace, 2009 album by American band Sleepy Sun
- Embrace, 2022 album by American electronic musician Kill the Noise

=== Songs ===
- "Embrace", by Korn from Untouchables (2002)
- "Embrace" (Pnau song), (2008)
- "E.M.B.R.A.C.E.", by Society of Soul from Brainchild (1995)
- "The Embrace", from the film score of the 1993 film The Piano, composed by Michael Nyman
- "Embrace", by the Bee Gees, from the 2001 album This Is Where I Came In

== Technology ==
- EMBRACE, a European former project involving information technology in biomolecular sciences
- EMBRACE (telescope), a prototype radio telescope located in France and The Netherlands
- Embrace, a brand name of smartwatches produced by Empatica, a company based in Boston, Massachusetts

== Other ==
- Embrace, extend, and extinguish, a business strategy
- Embrace of Acatempan, an 1821 event in Mexican history

== See also ==
- Embracer Group, a Swedish video game and media holding company
- Embracery, an attempt to influence a juror
