= Dirty South Classics =

Greatest hits album by Goodie Mob
- Released: December 16, 2003
- Recorded: 1994–1999
- Genre: Hip hop
- Length: 58:17
- Label: Arista
- Producer: Organized Noize

Goodie Mob chronology
World Party (1998)	Dirty South Classics (2003)	One Monkey Don't Stop No Show (2004)

Professional ratings
Review scores
Source	Rating
AllMusic	4.5/5 stars
Pitchfork	7/10
The New Rolling Stone Album Guide	4/5 stars

Dirty South Classics is the first greatest hits album by American Southern hip hop quartet Goodie Mob. It was released on December 16, 2003, via Arista Records, and composed of five songs from Soul Food (1995), six songs from Still Standing (1998) and four songs from World Party (1999). Production was handled by Organized Noize. It features guest appearances from Outkast, Backbone and TLC. The album did not make it to the Billboard 200, however, it peaked at number 99 on the Top R&B/Hip-Hop Albums in the United States.

== Background ==
By the time of the release of Dirty South Classics, member CeeLo Green was not a part of the Goodie Mob, as he left the group after the release of the group's third studio album, World Party in 1999. In 2002, he dropped his debut album, Cee-Lo Green and His Perfect Imperfections also via Arista Records. Member Big Gipp's debut solo album, Mutant Mindframe, was released a few months prior to Dirty South Classics through the independent record label Koch Records. The following year, Goodie Mob (without Cee-Lo) would record and release the group's fourth studio album, One Monkey Don't Stop No Show, also for Koch Records.

== Track listing ==
No.	Title	Writer(s)	Length
1.	"They Don't Dance No Mo'"	Robert Barnett; Thomas Callaway; Cameron Gipp; Willie Knighton; Patrick Brown; Ray Murray; Rico Wade; David Sheats	4:14
2.	"Cell Therapy"	Barnett; Callaway; Gipp; Knighton; Brown; Murray; Wade	5:01
3.	"Dirty South" (featuring Big Boi)	Gipp; Antwan Patton; Frederick Bell; Brown; Murray; Wade	3:31
4.	"Black Ice (Sky High)" (featuring Outkast)	Gipp; André Benjamin; Patton; Sheats	3:23
5.	"Soul Food"	Barnett; Callaway; Gipp; Knighton; Brown; Murray; Wade; Brandon Bennett	3:53
6.	"Get Rich to This" (featuring Big Boi and Backbone)	Barnett; Callaway; Gipp; Knighton; Brown; Murray; Wade	4:16
7.	"What It Ain't (Ghetto Enuff)" (featuring TLC)	Barnett; Callaway; Gipp; Knighton; Lisa Lopes; Dallas Austin	5:09
8.	"Parking Lot (Break)"		0:50
9.	"Beautiful Skin"	Barnett; Callaway; Gipp; Knighton; Craig Love	5:41
10.	"Still Standing"	Barnett; Callaway; Gipp; Knighton; Sheats	4:50
11.	"Fly Away"	Barnett; Callaway; Gipp; Knighton; Brown; Murray; Wade	4:41
12.	"Goodie Bag"	Barnett; Callaway; Gipp; Knighton; Brown; Murray; Wade	4:28
13.	"I.C.U."	Barnett; Callaway; Gipp; Knighton; Brown; Murray; Wade	4:06
14.	"The Experience"	Callaway; Brown; Murray; Wade	2:51
15.	"Free"	Callaway; Brown; Murray; Wade	1:23
Total length:			58:17

Notes

- Tracks 1, 4, 9, 10, 11 and 14 are taken from Still Standing (1998).
- Tracks 2, 3, 5, 12 and 15 are taken from Soul Food (1995).
- Tracks 6, 7, 8 and 13 are taken from World Party (1999).

== Charts ==
Chart (2004)	Peak position
US Top R&B/Hip-Hop Albums (Billboard)	99
