= East Point's Greatest Hit =

Studio album by Cool Breeze
- Released: March 23, 1999
- Studio: The Dungeon (SWATS, GA); Sound Chamber Recorders (Los Angeles, CA); The Chamber (SWATS, GA); Purple Dragon (SWATS, GA); The Boom Boom Room (Augusta, GA)
- Genre: Hip hop
- Length: 1:04:10
- Label: Orgazined Noize; A&M; Interscope
- Producer: 2 Cold Capone; Mr. DJ; Organized Noize; Skinny Miracles

Singles from East Point's Greatest Hit
- 1. "Watch for the Hook" Released: December 1, 1998; 2. "Creatine" Released: May 4, 1999

Professional ratings
Review scores
Source	Rating
AllMusic	4/5 stars
Robert Christgau	(neither)
RapReviews	6/10
The Source	3.5/5 stars
Spin	6/10

East Point's Greatest Hit is the only solo studio album by American rapper Cool Breeze. It was released on March 23, 1999, via Organized Noize/A&M Records. The recording sessions took place at the Dungeon Recording Studio, the Chamber Recording Studios and Purple Dragon Recording Studios in SWATS, Sound Chamber Recorders in Los Angeles and the Boom Boom Room in Augusta. It was produced by Organized Noize, Mr. DJ, 2 Cold Capone and Skinny Miracles. It features guest appearances from Witchdoctor, 8Ball, Backbone, Big Rube, Goodie Mob, Kurupt, Nivea, Outkast, Sleepy Brown and the Calhouns. The album peaked at number 38 on the Billboard 200 and number 11 on the Top R&B/Hip-Hop Albums in the United States. Its lead single, a Dungeon Family posse cut "Watch for the Hook", made it to No. 73 on the US Billboard Hot 100.

== Track listing ==
No.	Title	Writer(s)	Producer(s)	Length
1.	"Ghetto Camelot"	Frederick Bell; David Brown; Organized Noize	Organized Noize	4:09
2.	"Watch for the Hook (Dungeon Family Mix)" (featuring Outkast, Goodie Mob and Witchdoctor)	Bell; André Benjamin; Antwan Patton; Cameron Gipp; Willie Knighton; Thomas Callaway; Robert Barnett; Erin Johnson; Ruben Bailey; Organized Noize; Neil Young	Organized Noize	4:31
3.	"Good Good"	Bell; Organized Noize	Organized Noize	4:17
4.	"Pop, Pop, Pop" (Interlude)			1:42
5.	"Cre-A-Tine"	Bell; Organized Noize	Organized Noize	3:00
6.	"We Get It Crunk" (featuring Kurupt)	Bell; Ricardo Brown; Organized Noize	Organized Noize	4:29
7.	"College Parkay" (Interlude)			1:11
8.	"Butta"	Bell; Organized Noize	Organized Noize	4:27
9.	"Hit Man" (featuring Witchdoctor and Backbone)	Bell; Johnson; Jamahr Williams; Organized Noize	Organized Noize	4:42
10.	"Black Gangster"	Bell; Masaba Tyson	2 Cold Capone	4:01
11.	"Big Rube 4:38" (Interlude)	Bailey; Organized Noize	Organized Noize	1:36
12.	"The Field" (featuring Nivea)	Bell; Organized Noize	Organized Noize	4:38
13.	"E.P.G.H."	Bell; David Sheats	Mr. DJ	3:57
14.	"Tenn Points" (featuring 8Ball)	Bell; Premro Smith; Organized Noize	Organized Noize	4:12
15.	"Weeastpointin'" (featuring Sleepy Brown)	Bell; Organized Noize	Organized Noize	5:15
16.	"Doin' It in the South"	Bell; Organized Noize; Ray Parker Jr.	Skinny Miracles; Mr. DJ (co.)	3:19
17.	"The Calhouns" (featuring Lucky Calhoun, Pauly Calhoun and Slimm Calhoun)	Bell; Cedric Barnett; Vasco Whiteside; Brian Loving; Organized Noize	Organized Noize	4:44
Total length:				1:04:10

Sample credits

- Track 2 contains replayed elements from "Southern Man" written by Neil Young.
- Track 16 contains elements of "For Those Who Like to Groove" written by Ray Parker Jr.

== Personnel ==
- Frederick "Cool Breeze/Freddie Calhoun" Bell – vocals
- Rico Wade – additional vocals (track 1), programming (tracks: 1, 2, 8, 9), drum programming (tracks: 3, 5, 6, 10–12, 14, 15, 17), keyboards programming (tracks: 11, 12), producer (tracks: 1–3, 5, 6, 8, 9, 11, 12, 14, 15, 17), mixing (tracks: 1–3, 5, 6, 8–17), recording (track 11), executive producer
- Whild Peach – additional vocals (track 1), vocals (track 2)
- Andre "André 3000" Benjamin – vocals (track 2)
- Antwan "Big Boi" Patton – vocals (track 2)
- Cameron Gipp – vocals (track 2)
- Willie "Khujo" Knighton – vocals (track 2)
- Thomas "CeeLo Green" Callaway – vocals (track 2)
- Robert "T-Mo" Barnett – vocals (track 2)
- Erin "Witchdoctor" Johnson – vocals (tracks: 2, 9)
- Ruben "Big Rube" Bailey – additional vocals (track 2), vocals (track 11)
- Ricardo "Kurupt" Brown – vocals (track 6)
- Patrick "Sleepy" Brown – backing vocals (track 8), additional vocals (track 15), programming (tracks: 1, 2, 8, 9), drum programming (tracks: 3, 5, 6, 10–12, 14, 15, 17), keyboards programming (tracks: 11, 12), producer (tracks: 1–3, 5, 6, 8, 9, 11, 12, 14, 15, 17), mixing (tracks: 1–3, 5, 6, 8–17), recording (track 11), executive producer
- Debra Killings – backing vocals (tracks: 8, 13)
- Jamahr "Backbone" Williams – vocals (track 9)
- Collier Starks – backing vocals (track 11)
- Mark Starks – backing vocals (track 11)
- Nivea B. Hamilton – additional vocals (tracks: 12, 14)
- Premro "8Ball" Smith – vocals (track 14)
- Dee Dee "Peaches" Hibbler-Murray – additional vocals (track 14), A&R
- Marvin "Chanz" Parkman – backing vocals & keyboards (track 16), Rhodes electric piano (tracks: 13, 15)
- Cedric "Swift C/Lucky Calhoun" Barnett – vocals (track 17)
- Vasco "Big L/Pauly Calhoun" Whiteside – vocals (track 17), scratches (tracks: 2, 17)
- Brian "Slimm Calhoun" Loving – vocals (track 17)
- David "Whild" Brown – guitar (tracks: 1, 5, 6, 12)
- George Bohanon – trombone (track 1)
- South Central Chamber Orchestra – horns (track 1), strings (track 14)
- Charles Veal Jr. – concertmaster (tracks: 1, 14), horns conductor and arranger (track 1), strings conductor and arranger (track 14)
- Preston Crump – bass (tracks: 3, 6, 8, 10, 13–15)
- Skinny Miracles – organ (track 8), Wurlitzer electric piano (track 11), bass (track 12), producer & programming (track 16)
- Richard Muscadin – trombone (track 9)
- Antoine Hollins – tuba (track 9)
- Victor Alexander – drums (track 14)
- Dean Paul Gant – keyboards (track 14)
- Brian Timms – talkbox (track 16)
- Ray Murray – programming (tracks: 1, 2, 8, 9), drum programming (tracks: 3, 5, 6, 10–12, 14, 15, 17), keyboards programming (tracks: 11, 12), producer (tracks: 1–3, 5, 6, 8, 9, 11, 12, 14, 15, 17), mixing (tracks: 1–3, 5, 6, 8–17), recording (track 11), executive producer
- David "Mr. DJ" Sheats – programming & producer (track 13), co-producer & mixing (track 16)
- Masaba "2 Cold Capone" Tyson – producer (track 10)
- John "Bernasky" Wall – recording (tracks: 1–3, 5, 6, 8–17), mixing (track 11)
- Gerry "The Gov" Brown – recording (tracks: 1, 14)
- Kevin Parker – recording (tracks: 5, 8, 14, 16)
- Blake Eiseman – recording (track 12)
- Shawn Grove – recording (track 13)
- Herbert Kelley – recording assistant (tracks: 5, 6, 14, 15, 17)
- Orlando McGhee – recording assistant (track 9)
- Kenneth Stallworth – recording assistant (track 12)
- Vincent Marshel – recording assistant (track 13)
- Neal H Pogue – mixing (tracks: 1, 12–15, 17)
- Alvin Speights – mixing (tracks: 2, 9)
- Joshua A. "Josh" Butler – mixing (tracks: 3, 5, 6, 8, 10, 16)
- Cap 1 – mixing (track 10)
- J.R. Rodriquez – mixing assistant (track 2)
- Jason Stokes – mixing assistant (track 13)
- Ricciano "Ricco" Lumpkins – mixing assistant (track 13)
- Chris Bellman – mastering
- Aahmek Richards – art direction, design
- Piotr Sikora – photography
- Shem Lwanga – additional photography
- Terri Haskins – creative director

== Charts ==
Chart (1999)	Peak position
US Billboard 200	38
US Top R&B/Hip-Hop Albums (Billboard)	11
