= Swats =

Swats can mean:

- Swats (drink), a liquid, which may be drunk, produced as a by-product of the making of the Scottish dish sowans
- Swats, strikes with a paddle during school corporal punishment in the United States
- The S.W.A.T.S., a nickname for southwestern Atlanta and adjacent areas
