= Erik Bongcam-Rudloff =

Chilean-born Swedish biologist and computer scientist

Erik Bongcam-Rudloff is a Chilean-born Swedish biologist and computer scientist. He received his doctorate in medical sciences from Uppsala University in 1994. He is Professor of Bioinformatics and the head of SLU-Global Bioinformatics Centre at the Swedish University of Agricultural Sciences. His main research deals with development of bioinformatics solutions for the Life Sciences community.

He was the chairman of EMBnet, (2003–2010) a science-based group of collaborating bioinformatics nodes throughout Europe, and a number of nodes outside Europe. He is also the director of SLU-Global Bioinformatics Centre which created eBiotools, eBioX and eBioKit.

Erik Bongcam-Rudloff is also executive board member of:

- ISCB, The International Society for Computational Biology (ISCB)
- EMBRACE, European Model for Bioinformatics Research and Community Education
- EuroKup, European Kidney and Urine Proteomics, an EU COST-action.
- UPPMAX, Uppsala Multidisciplinary Center for Advanced Computational Science. UPPMAX is a Swedish regional center for high performance computing. UPPMAX is part of SweGrid.
- MedBioInfo, Swedish National Research School in Medical Bioinformatics.
- GOBLET, The Global Organisation for Bioinformatics Learning, Education and Training.

Coordinator of:

- B3Africa, "Bridging Biobanking and Biomedical Research across Europe and Africa". B3Africa aims to implement a cooperation platform and technical informatics framework for biobank integration between Africa and Europe.
- SeqAhead, Chairman of the European COST Action: Next Generation Sequencing Data Analysis Network
- ALLBIO, Broadening the Bioinformatics Infrastructure to unicellular, animal, and plant science. ALLBIO is a FP7 project, KBBE.2011.3.6-02: Supporting the development of Bioinformatics Infrastructures for the effective exploitation of genomic data: Beyond health applications.

In 1992 he survived attempted murder at the hands of John Ausonius.

During his undergraduate years in Uppsala Erik was an accomplished photographer documenting contemporary student life at the university.
