= ATLiens =

Studio album by Outkast
- Released: August 27, 1996
- Recorded: 1994–1996
- Studios: Bosstown Recording Studios, Doppler, PatchWerk Recording, Purple Dragon Studios, Studio LaCoCo (Atlanta, Georgia); Chung King, Sound On Sound Recording (New York City, New York)
- Genres: Southern hip-hop; alternative hip-hop
- Length: 57:23
- Labels: LaFace; Arista
- Producers: Organized Noize; Outkast

Outkast chronology
Southernplayalisticadillacmuzik (1994)	ATLiens (1996)	Aquemini (1998)

Singles from ATLiens
- 1. "Elevators (Me & You)" Released: July 5, 1996; 2. "ATLiens" / "Wheelz of Steel" Released: August 20, 1996; 3. "Jazzy Belle" Released: April 1997

ATLiens (/ˌeɪtiːˈɛliənz/) is the second studio album by the American hip hop duo Outkast. It was released on August 27, 1996, by Arista Records and LaFace Records. From 1995 to 1996, Outkast recorded ATLiens in sessions at several Atlanta studios—Bosstown Recording Studios, Doppler Recording Studios, PatchWerk Recording Studio, Purple Dragon Studios, and Studio LaCoCo—as well as Chung King Recording Studio and Sound On Sound Recording in New York City.

The album features outer space-inspired production sounds, with Outkast and producers Organized Noize incorporating elements of dub and gospel into the compositions. Several songs feature the duo's first attempts at producing music by themselves. Lyrically, the group discusses a wide range of topics, including urban life as hustlers, existential introspection, and extraterrestrial life. The album's title is a portmanteau of "ATL" (an abbreviation of Atlanta, Georgia, the duo's hometown) and "aliens", which has been interpreted by critics as symbolizing the duo's feeling of being estranged from American society.

ATLiens debuted at number two on the US Billboard 200 chart, and it sold nearly 350,000 copies in its first two weeks of release. The album was very well received by music critics upon its release, who praised its unique sound and lyrical content. It has been certified double platinum by the Recording Industry Association of America (RIAA), for shipments of two million copies in the United States. The album spawned the singles "Elevators (Me & You)", "ATLiens" / "Wheelz of Steel", and "Jazzy Belle". Since its release, ATLiens has been listed by several magazines and critics as one of the greatest hip hop albums of all time.

== Background ==
In 1994, Outkast released their debut album, Southernplayalisticadillacmuzik, which was recorded when members Big Boi and André 3000 were 18 years old. Bolstered by the success of the single "Player's Ball", the record established Outkast as prominent figures in the Southern hip hop scene. After the album was certified platinum, LaFace Records gave Outkast more creative control and advanced money for their 1996 follow-up album ATLiens. The duo took the opportunity to recreate their image. On a trip to Jamaica with producer Mr. DJ, the two decided to abandon their cornrow hairstyles in favor of a more natural aesthetic, vowing to stop combing their hair. Dungeon Family member Big Rube observed an increase in the duo's confidence after returning from their first tour, remarking, "They started understanding the power they had in their music. They started showing a swagger that certain artists have—the ones that are stars." The members also underwent changes in their personal lives; in 1995, Big Boi's girlfriend gave birth to their first child and André 3000 and Total's Keisha Spivey ended their two-year relationship.

Despite its success, Southernplayalisticadillacmuzik had some detractors, including hip hop tastemakers who were unaccustomed to the album's style. As the East Coast and West Coast hip hop scenes were already well-established at the time, many did not view the South as a legitimate and respectable scene. At the 1995 Source Awards, an award ceremony held by The Source magazine, Outkast won in the "Best Newcomer" category, but were booed upon taking the stage and delivering their acceptance speech; in response, André 3000 said, "The South got somethin' to say." He later recalled how the album was received by some listeners: "People thought that the South basically only had bass music. At first people were looking at us like 'Um, I don't know.'" Taken aback by the backlash, André 3000 and Big Boi channeled their frustration in the studio to improve upon their debut.

== Recording and production ==
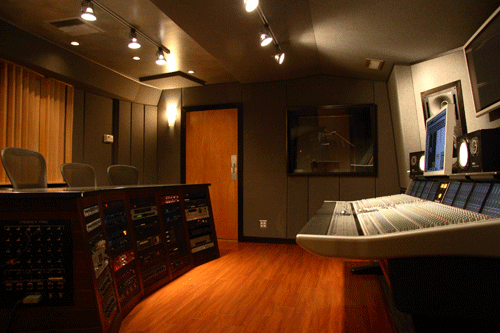
PatchWerk Recording Studio in Atlanta, one of the album's recording locations

After acquiring their own recording studio, the duo immediately started working on new material and assimilated themselves with music recording and studio equipment, as they sought to become more ambitious artists and less dependent on other producers. The two also became more accustomed to playing live, particularly Big Boi, and André 3000 significantly changed his lifestyle; he adopted a more eccentric fashion sense, became a vegetarian (he has since resumed eating meat), and stopped smoking marijuana. Having dropped out months before graduation, André 3000 returned to high school to earn his diploma during the recording of ATLiens.

Before beginning work on ATLiens, André 3000 purchased an SP1200 drum machine, an MPC3000 sampler, a TASCAM mixing board, and turntables with stacks of classic records. Although he had never produced a song before, he used techniques learned from observing the Dungeon Crew at work. "Elevators (Me & You)" was the first song the duo created together for the album. The duo refrained from sampling on the album, with Big Boi explaining "I feel like you cheat the listener when you sample. If it's an old school jam, leave it to the old. We wanna have our own school of music."

Outkast recorded the album in sessions at several Atlanta studios—Bosstown Recording Studios, Doppler Recording Studios, PatchWerk Recording Studio, Purple Dragon Studios, and Studio LaCoCo—as well as Chung King Recording Studio and Sound On Sound Recording in New York City. For ATLiens, the band aimed for a consistent set of songs in which a listener would not need to skip tracks; Outkast wrote around 35 songs for the album and reduced them to fourteen. The duo's songwriting style for the album had no solid structure and was mostly spontaneous; Big Boi noted, "Stuff'll just come to you. I'll be sittin' in the truck, and I'll start rhymin'. People look at me like I'm crazy, but that's how it starts."

== Composition ==
=== Music ===
"Elevators (Me & You)"
The echo-laden track illustrates Outkast's rise to fame and exemplifies the album's sparse, atmospheric production with organ riffs, dub bass, and telephone tones.

"13th Floor/Growing Old"
The album's closing track is a meditation on aging that contains Prince-like piano and soulful vocals from singer Debra Killings.

Two-thirds of the album is produced by Organized Noize, Outkast's primary production team. The rest is produced by Earthtone III, a production team that includes Outkast themselves and Mr. DJ. André 3000 and Big Boi produced the songs "Jazzy Belle" and "Elevators (Me & You)". It also has a notably more laid-back, spacey production sound, which they expanded upon on their follow-up album Aquemini. Although the group drew from George Clinton's outer-space inspired compositions, the band utilizes a more laid-back style as opposed to Clinton's hard funk leanings. Many tracks feature strong echo and reverb, taking influence from dub and reggae. Andrea Comer of the Hartford Courant perceives an "extraterrestrial feel" in the record's production.

MTV wrote that the album's production "built giddy, chaotic hooks around throbbing bass grooves, neck-snapping drums and bits of backwoods country and psychedelic rock for good measure." Outkast also incorporated elements of gospel into the music; being from the South, the group felt obligated to "stay close to [their] slave roots". The album's introduction track "You May Die" has been described as "churchy". "Elevators (Me & You)" contains atmospheric elements including echoes, dub-influenced bass, organ riffs, and telephone tones. "13th Floor/Growing Old" contains a spoken word introduction from Big Rube, somber soul vocals from Debra Killings, and a "Prince-ish" piano riff, while "Wheelz of Steel" features "furious" turntable scratching by Mr. DJ. "Extraterrestrial" offers a break in the continuity of the record as it features no drum beat.

=== Lyrics ===
Lyrically, André 3000 and Big Boi abandon the "hard-partying playa characters" of their debut album in favor of more spacey, funky, and futuristic personas on ATLiens. With their lyrics, the duo hoped to reflect on maturity in the wake of the birth of Big Boi's daughter. André 3000 explained, "It's like everybody's talking about sipping champagne and being big time, so we just took it upon ourselves to do something new ... I want my children to say, 'Daddy really said something, he wasn't just trying to brag on himself.'" Many songs on ATLiens feature more unconventional subject matter for hip hop. The lyrical content ranges from addressing urban life as hustlers and pimps to extraterrestrial life and space travel. The title track's chorus expresses Southern pride, while its verses feature André 3000 explaining his newly adopted drug-free lifestyle.

"Elevators (Me & You)" illustrates Outkast's rise to fame, and was inspired by a show the band played at Howard University with P. Diddy in the audience. The song also discusses the unlikely partnership of André 3000 and Big Boi, and uses the metaphor of an elevator for the ups and downs of fame. The final verse illustrates André 3000 dealing with a fan who pretends to have been childhood friends with him. It also references Southern culture, including mentions of Cadillacs and extended family gatherings. "Babylon" reflects on religious attitudes towards sex and illustrates André 3000's upbringing and his forbidden attractions throughout childhood. "Jazzy Belle" discusses the group's "increasingly enlightened" view regarding women: "Went from yellin' ... bitches and hoes to queen thangs". The album's closer "13th Floor/Growing Old" is a meditation on aging and emphasizes Southern hip hop's legitimacy.

== Release ==
=== Promotion ===
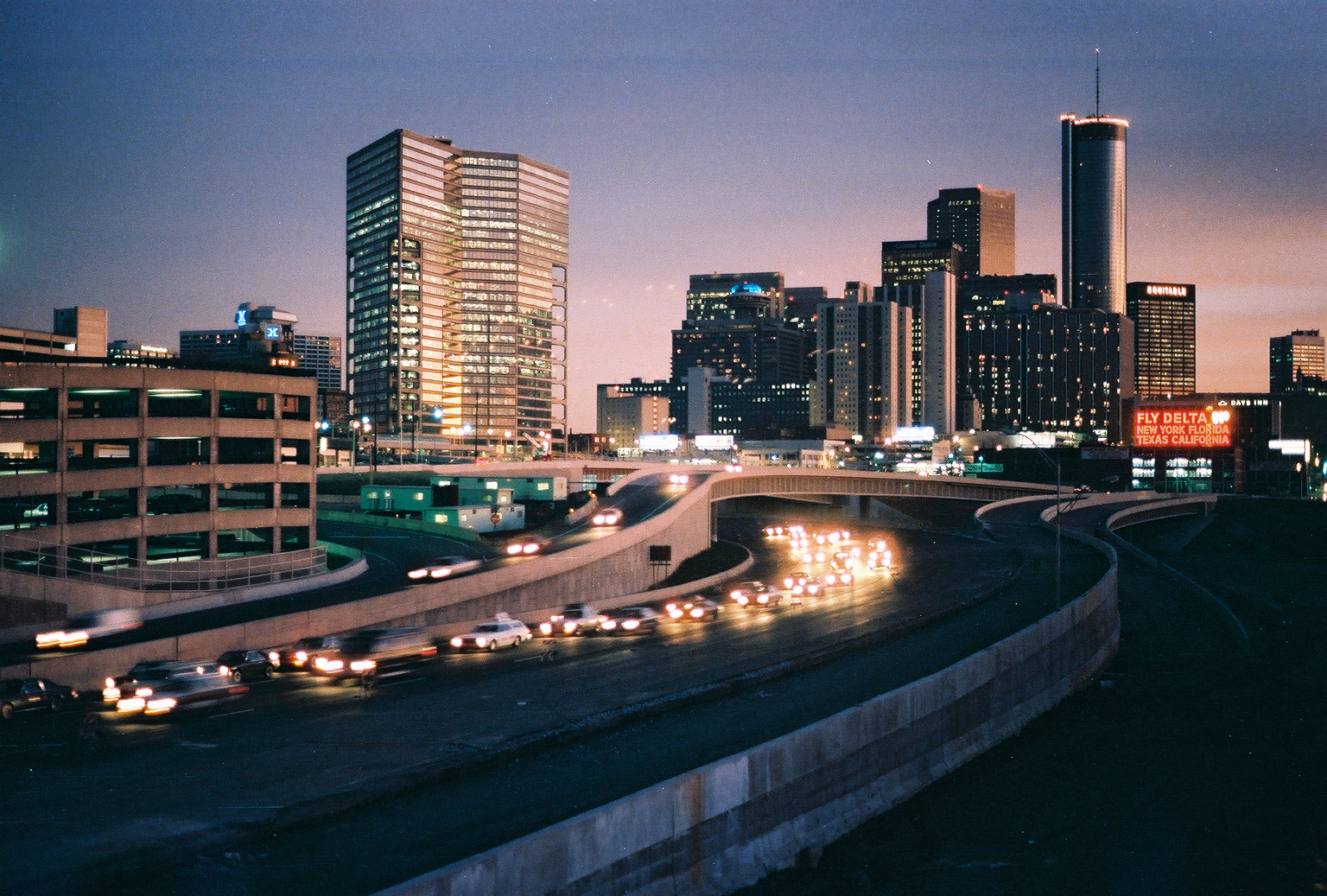
The album is a portmanteau of "ATL" (an abbreviation of Atlanta, Georgia) and "aliens". (Atlanta skyline pictured in 1982).

ATLiens was released on August 27, 1996, by LaFace Records. In September, LaFace created a promotion for the record in conjunction with Blockbuster in which customers could enter to win a 1970s Cadillac car, emphasizing Outkast and Cadillac's connection with the Southern lifestyle. The record's inner booklet features a 24-page comic strip foldout starring the members, who must defend "positive music" against the villain Nosamulli. The strip continues in the artwork for each single released from ATLiens except for "Elevators (Me & You)".

The album's title is a portmanteau of "ATL" (an abbreviation of Atlanta, Georgia) and "aliens". In his book Icons of Hip Hop: An Encyclopedia of the Movement, Music, and Culture, author T. Hasan Johnson interprets the album's title as "partly a statement about being from Atlanta, while also signifying on the theme of the group's name (by using the term aliens) framing themselves as societal outcasts." Mark Bould, author of The Routledge Companion to Science Fiction, observes that the title symbolizes Outkast's "estrangement from American society", suggesting that "the inner city of their formative years is out of this world and its hostile conditions."

=== Commercial performance and singles ===
ATLiens debuted and peaked at number two on the US Billboard 200 chart, and it sold nearly 350,000 copies in its first two weeks of release. It ultimately spent 33 weeks on the Billboard 200 chart. Internationally, the album reached number 16 in Canada and number 82 in Germany. The album was certified Platinum by the Recording Industry Association of America (RIAA) on November 6, 1996, for shipments of one million copies in the United States. By 1998, it had sold over 1.2 million copies. On June 24, 2003, the RIAA certified ATLiens double platinum, having shipped two million copies in the US.

Three singles were released from the album. "Elevators (Me & You)" was released as the first single on July 5, 1996. The song reached number 12 and spent 20 weeks on the Billboard Hot 100 chart. It was certified Gold by the RIAA on September 13, 1996, for shipments of 500,000 copies in the US, and Platinum on December 13, 2024, for shipments of one million copies in the US. "ATLiens" was issued as a double A-side single with "Wheelz of Steel" on August 20, 1996, as the second single from the album. The double A-side single reached number 23 on Billboard's Hot R&B/Hip-Hop Songs chart and number 3 on the Hot Rap Songs chart. However, only "ATLiens", when charting separately, entered the Hot 100, where it reached number 35 and remained on the chart for 17 weeks. The song was also certified Gold by the RIAA on December 13, 2024, for shipments of 500,000 copies in the US. "Jazzy Belle" was released as the third and final single in April 1997. It spent 14 weeks and peaked at number 52 on the Hot 100.

== Critical reception ==
Professional ratings
Contemporary reviews
Review scores
Source	Rating
The Atlanta Journal-Constitution	3.5/4 stars
The Philadelphia Inquirer	3/4 stars
Rolling Stone	4/5 stars
The Source	4/5 stars

ATLiens received critical acclaim. Andrea Comer of the Hartford Courant felt that Outkast's "lyrical acumen shines through" despite "Heltah-Skeltah mumbling and Southern slang", and stated, "after a few rotations, the alien feeling wears away, and [the album is] just out of this world." Sonia Murray of The Atlanta Journal-Constitution called the album "more thoughtful" than its predecessor, noting, "What the second album lacks in adventurous arrangements it more than makes up for in lyrical dominance." The Source's Allen S. Gordon observed "growth" from Outkast and Organized Noize, and stated, "Big Boi and Dre have gone out of this world into a new dimension of sight, sound and mind".

Kevin Powell of Rolling Stone felt that, like Outkast's debut album, ATLiens is "a gritty document of what's happening here and now, an up-to-the-minute briefing on Southern black ghetto life on which Outkast members Andre and Big Boi cast their feelings of alienation in familiar, realistic characterizations". Powell asserted that unlike East Coast hip hop's "hedonistic materialism" or "the gunplay and pimpism" of West Coast hip hop, "Andre and Big Boi display a unique ability to describe ghetto life while offering up life-affirming possibilities, something all too rare in today's hip-hop nation." Richard Harrington of The Washington Post enjoyed the record's "more serious and focused lyrical sensibility", explaining, "The raps are generally inventive, clever without being cloying, more proof (if any were needed) that hip-hop innovation isn't just an East-West thang."

== Legacy ==
Professional ratings
Retrospective reviews
Review scores
Source	Rating
AllMusic	5/5 stars
The Austin Chronicle	4/5 stars
Blender	4/5 stars
Encyclopedia of Popular Music	3/5 stars
The Great Rock Discography	7/10
Pitchfork	9.6/10
RapReviews	10/10
The Rolling Stone Album Guide	3/5 stars

In a retrospective review, AllMusic editor Steve Huey viewed the album as Outkast's "most focused work" and commented that "In addition to the striking musical leap forward, Dre and Big Boi continue to grow as rappers; their flows are getting more tongue-twistingly complex, and their lyrics more free-associative". RapReviews critic Steve Juon recommended it to listeners who "want to be challenged by [their] hip-hop" and wrote of the album's aesthetic:

It's deep. So deep that listening to ATLiens you might feel like drowning, but the smooth vo-cals of Big Boi and the earthy flows of Andre always push you back up to the surface. They are players in the truest sense of the word; not just playing for ends but playing to win in the ultimate battle of life over death, good over bad, and righteousness over evil. Yet, it's not that heavy either. This album is nod your head music, shake your ass music. It makes you think and groove at the same time.

In The Rolling Stone Album Guide (2004), Roni Sarig felt that, strong rapping notwithstanding, the album's music "suffers as the duo make their first attempt at self-producing" and stated, "Although ATLiens promised expanded vistas with its interstellar motif, the record delivered something of a sophomore slump ... At best, ATLiens is the sound of an ambitious group searching for its voice."

In 1998, the album was selected as one of The Source's "100 Best Rap Albums". In 2000, Exclaim! listed the album on their "100 Records That Rocked 100 Issues of Exclaim!" list. Hip Hop Connection ranked it number six on their list of "The 100 Greatest Rap Albums 1995–2005". Complex ranked the album fifth on their list of "The 50 Greatest Sophomore Albums in Hip-Hop History", its title 15th on "The 50 Best Rap Album Titles Ever", and the title track's beat 91st on "The 100 Greatest Hip-Hop Beats of All Time". Rappers Isaiah Rashad, Wiz Khalifa and Dom Kennedy, and DJ Jesse Marco have named ATLiens as one of their favorite albums.

== Track listing ==
Track listing and samples compiled from album liner notes. All tracks produced by Organized Noize Productions, except where noted.

No.	Title	Writer(s)	Producer(s)	Length
1.	"You May Die (Intro)"	Organized Noize; Joi Gilliam; Myrna Crenshaw		1:05
2.	"Two Dope Boyz (In a Cadillac)"	Organized Noize; André Benjamin; Antwan Patton		2:46
3.	"ATLiens"	Benjamin; Patton	Outkast	3:50
4.	"Wheelz of Steel"	Benjamin; Patton	Outkast	4:03
5.	"Jazzy Belle"	Organized Noize; Benjamin; Patton		4:12
6.	"Elevators (Me & You)"	Benjamin; Patton	Outkast	4:25
7.	"Ova da Wudz" (featuring Witchdoctor)	Benjamin; Patton; Erin Johnson	Outkast	3:48
8.	"Babylon"	Organized Noize; Benjamin; Patton; Andrea and Ivan		4:24
9.	"Wailin'"	Organized Noize; Benjamin; Patton		2:00
10.	"Mainstream" (featuring T-Mo and Khujo)	Organized Noize; Benjamin; Patton; Robert T. Barnett; Willie Knighton		5:18
11.	"Decatur Psalm" (featuring Big Gipp and Cool Breeze)	Organized Noize; Cameron Gipp; Benjamin; Patton; Frederick Bell		3:58
12.	"Millennium"	Organized Noize; Benjamin; Patton		3:09
13.	"E.T. (Extraterrestrial)" (featuring Witchdoctor)	Benjamin; Patton; Johnson	Outkast	3:07
14.	"13th Floor / Growing Old"	Organized Noize; Marqueze Ethridge; Benjamin; Patton		6:50
15.	"Elevators" (ONP 86 Mix)	Benjamin; Patton		4:37
Total length:				57:23

Notes

- "You May Die (Intro)" features additional vocals by Joi, Screechy Peach and Trina
- "Two Dope Boyz (In a Cadillac)" features additional vocals by Screechy Peach
- "Ova Du Wudz" and "E.T. (Extra-Terrestrial) feature additional vocals by EJ Tha Witch Doctor
- "Babylon" features additional vocals by Andrea Martin
- "Wailin'" features additional vocals by Cee-Lo of Goodie Mob
- "Mainstream" features additional vocals by Khujo and T-Mo of Goodie Mob
- "Decatur Psalm" features additional vocals by Big Gipp of Goodie Mob and Cool Breeze
- "Millennium" features additional vocals by ShaJuanna Edghill
- "13th Floor / Growing Old" features additional vocals by Big Rube and Debra Killings

Sample credits

- "You May Die (Intro)" is an interpolation of "Summer in the City" performed by Quincy Jones.
- "Two Dope Boyz (In a Cadillac)" contains a sample of "D.E.E.P." performed by Outkast, and "Danger, She's a Stranger" performed by The Five Stairsteps.
- "ATLiens" contains a sample of "Around the World" performed by Attilio Mineo, and "So Tired" performed by The Chambers Brothers.
- "Wheelz of Steel" contains a sample of "Focus III" performed by Focus, "Saturday Night Style" performed by Mikey Dread.
- "Jazzy Belle" contains a sample of "It's Yours" performed by T La Rock and Jazzy Jay, and "Prelude" performed by Lamont Dozier.
- "Elevators" contains a sample of "Blue Suede Shoes" performed by Carl Perkins.
- "Elevators (Me & You) [ONP 86 Mix]" contains a sample of "Come in Out of the Rain" performed by Parliament; the original contains SFX from the video game Super Mario Bros.
- "Ova Da Wudz" contain a sample of "Judas" performed by Society of Soul.
- "Babylon" contains a sample of "12 O'Clock" performed by Vangelis.
- "Wailin'" contains a sample of "To the Establishment" performed by Lou Bond.
- "Mainstream" contains a sample of "Sesame Street" performed by Goodie Mob and "Soldier In Our Town" by Iron Butterfly.
- "Decatur Psalm" contains a sample of "Cebu" performed by The Commodores.

== Personnel ==
Compiled from album liner notes.

=== Musicians ===
OutKast

- Andre 3000 – vocals
- Big Boi – vocals

Guests

- Andrea Martin – vocals
- Big Gipp – vocals
- Big Rube – vocals
- Carlos Glover – acoustic guitar
- Cee-Lo – vocals
- Cool Breeze – vocals
- Craig Love – guitar
- Debra Killings – vocals
- Dee Simmons – drums
- Ed Stroud – guitar
- James "Jay" Nicholas – bass
- Jazzyfatnastees – vocals
- Joi – vocals
- Kenny Wright – keyboard
- Kerren Berz – violin
- Khujo – vocals
- Marq Jefferson – bass guitar
- Martin Terry – guitar
- Marvin "Chanz" Parkman – keyboard, organ
- Mr. DJ – scratches
- Preston Crump – bass guitar
- ShaJuanna Edghill – vocals
- Skinny Miracles – piano
- Sleepy Brown – vocals
- T-Mo – Vocals
- Tamara Powell – vocals
- Tommy Martin – acoustic guitar
- Trina Powell – vocals
- Screechy Peach – vocals
- Witchdoctor – vocals

=== Production ===
- Alvin Speights – mixing
- Bernasky Wall – engineering
- Blake Eiseman – engineering
- Brian Frye – engineering
- Carlton Batts – mastering
- Derrick Williams – engineering
- Dexter Simmons – engineering, mixing
- Jarvis Blackshear – engineering
- John Frye – engineering
- John Wydrycs – engineering
- Leslie Brathwaite – mixing
- Mike Wilson – engineering
- Neal Pogue – mixing
- Organized Noize – drum programming, keyboard programming, mixing, production
- Outkast – drum programming, keyboard programming, mixing, production

== Charts ==
=== Weekly charts ===
Chart (1996)	Peak position
Canadian Albums (RPM)	16
German Albums (Offizielle Top 100)	82
US Billboard 200	2
US Top R&B/Hip-Hop Albums (Billboard)	1

=== Year-end charts ===
Chart (1996)	Position
US Billboard 200	77
US Top R&B/Hip-Hop Albums (Billboard)	19

== Certifications ==
Certifications for ATLiens
Region	Certification	Certified units/sales
Canada (Music Canada)	Gold	50,000^{^}
United States (RIAA)	2× Platinum	2,000,000^{^}
^{^} Shipments figures based on certification alone.

== See also ==
- List of Billboard number-one R&B albums of 1996
