= Git Up, Git Out =

Single by Outkast featuring Goodie Mob

from the album Southernplayalisticadillacmuzik
- Released: October 18, 1994
- Recorded: 1993–94
- Genre: Hip hop
- Length: 7:27
- Label: LaFace; Arista; RCA
- Songwriters: Benjamin; Thomas Burton; Cameron Gipp; Patton
- Producer: Organized Noize

OutKast singles chronology
"Southernplayalisticadillacmuzik" (1994)	"Git Up, Git Out" (1994)	"Elevators (Me & You)" (1996)

Music video
- "Git Up, Git Out" on YouTube

"Git Up, Git Out" is a song by the American hip-hop duo Outkast from their debut studio album Southernplayalisticadillacmuzik (1994). A conscious Southern story-rap about the dangers of giving in to circumstances and not doing anything with one's life, the song features Cee-Lo and Big Gipp of Goodie Mob, the second appearance of any of Goodie Mob's members, after "Call Of Da Wild". Produced by the Dungeon Family's own Organized Noize, the track is also featured in the 2006 film ATL, which also featured Big Boi, and was sampled in the 1998 hit "Can I Get A..." by Jay-Z feat. Ja Rule and Amil, during Amil's verse, and in Macy Gray's 1999 debut single "Do Something".

== Track listing ==
CD Single

1. "Git Up, Git Out" – 7:27
2. "Git Up, Git Out" (Outkast Mix) – 4:10
3. "Git Up, Git Out" (Goodie Mob Mix) – 4:05
4. "Git Up, Git Out" (Full Mix) – 7:39
5. "Git Up, Git Out" (Instrumental) – 7:36

12" Vinyl Single

1. "Git Up, Git Out" – 7:27
2. "Git Up, Git Out" (Full Mix) – 7:39
3. "Git Up, Git Out" (Goodie Mob Mix) – 4:05
4. "Git Up, Git Out" (Outkast Mix) – 4:10
5. "Git Up, Git Out" (Instrumental) – 7:36

== Charts ==
Chart (1994)	Peak position
U.S. Billboard Hot R&B/Hip-Hop Songs	59
