= Elevators (Me & You) =

Single by Outkast

from the album ATLiens
- Released: July 5, 1996
- Recorded: 1995
- Studio: LaCoCo, Doppler and PatchWerk (Atlanta, Georgia)
- Genre: Alternative hip hop; trip hop; psychedelic rap
- Length: 4:25
- Label: LaFace
- Songwriters: André Benjamin; Antwan Patton
- Producer: Outkast

Outkast singles chronology
"Git Up, Git Out" (1994)	"Elevators (Me & You)" (1996)	"ATLiens" / "Wheelz of Steel" (1996)

Music video
- "Elevators (Me & You)" on YouTube

"Elevators (Me & You)" is a song by American hip hop duo Outkast, released as the lead single from their second studio album, ATLiens. It peaked at number 12 on the Billboard Hot 100, Outkast's highest-peaking song on the chart until the release of "Ms. Jackson" in 2000. The single also peaked at number one on the US Hot Rap Tracks chart. It was later featured on their compilation Big Boi and Dre Present... OutKast.

== Track listings ==
- CD single
1. "Elevators (Me & You)" (Clean Version) – 4:25
2. "Elevators (Me & You)" (LP Version) – 4:25
3. "Elevators (Me & You)" (LP Instrumental) – 4:25
- Maxi single
1. "Elevators (Me & You)" (Crazy "C" Trunk Rattlin' Mix) – 4:35
2. "Elevators (Me & You)" (ONP 86 Mix) – 4:35
3. "Elevators (Me & You)" (ONP 86 Instrumental) – 4:36
4. "Elevators (Me & You)" (Album Version) – 4:25
5. "Elevators (Me & You)" (Crazy "C" Trunk Rattlin' Instrumental) – 4:33
- 12-inch single
1. "Elevators (Me & You)" (Crazy "C" Trunk Rattlin' Mix) – 4:35
2. "Elevators (Me & You)" (ONP 86 Mix) – 4:35
3. "Elevators (Me & You)" (Acappella) – 4:00
4. "Elevators (Me & You)" (Crazy "C" Trunk Rattlin' Instrumental) – 4:33
5. "Elevators (Me & You)" (ONP 86 Instrumental) – 4:36
6. "Elevators (Me & You)" (Album Version) – 4:25
- Cassette single
1. "Elevators (Me & You)" (Album Version) – 4:25
2. "Elevators (Me & You)" (Album Instrumental) – 4:25

== Credits and personnel ==
The credits for "Elevators (Me & You)" are adapted from the liner notes of ATLiens.

Studio locations

- Mastered at The Hit Factory, New York City, New York.
- Mixed at DARP Studios, Atlanta, Georgia.
- Recorded at Doppler Studios, PatchWerk Recording Studios and Studio LaCoCo, all in Atlanta, Georgia.

Personnel

- Outkast – drum programming, keyboard programming, mixing, production, songwriting, vocals
- John Frye – engineering
- John "Bernasky" Wall – engineering
- Jarvis Blackshear – engineering
- Derrick Williams – engineering
- Manuel K. Morris – engineering assistant
- Alex Lowe – engineering assistant
- Brian Frye – engineering assistant
- Neal Pogue – mixing
- Organized Noize – mixing
- Rico Lumpkin – mixing assistant
- Carlton Batts – mastering
- Preston Crump – bass
- Debra Killings – background vocals
- Sleepy Brown – background vocals

== Charts ==
=== Weekly charts ===
Chart (1996)	Peak position
US Billboard Hot 100	12
US Dance Singles Sales (Billboard)	2
US Hot R&B/Hip-Hop Songs (Billboard)	5
US Hot Rap Songs (Billboard)	1

=== Year-end charts ===
Chart (1996)	Position
US Billboard Hot 100	59
US Hot R&B/Hip-Hop Songs (Billboard)	39

== Certifications ==
Region	Certification	Certified units/sales
United States (RIAA)	Platinum	1,000,000^{‡}
^{‡} Sales+streaming figures based on certification alone.
