= Healthcare Professionals for Healthcare Reform =

American-based group of healthcare professionals

Healthcare Professionals for Healthcare Reform (HPfHR), is a group of physicians, nurses, public health experts, healthcare economists, health information technologists, business leaders, hospital administrators, politicians, patients and many others who developed a 3 tiered healthcare system reform plan for the United States called The EMBRACE Healthcare Reform Plan (an acronym for Expanding Medical and Behavioral Resources with Access to Care for Everyone). The group claims that they are politically non-partisan.

== History ==
Co-founded by physicians Kimberly Yonkers, Charles Landau and Gilead Lancaster in 2007, the group initially wanted to come up with solutions to the current healthcare system from the point of view of the patient and doctor. They felt that the only effective solution required a complete restructuring of the healthcare system from top to bottom and that systems from other countries as well as single payer plans proposed in this country would never be accepted by the American public or the US Congress.

The group identified five important parts of the American healthcare system that needed to be addressed. These included the inefficiencies in medical offices and hospitals, the need to cover the entire population for basic healthcare services and keep the great quality of the current delivery of healthcare, promote and integrate scientifically validated diagnostic and therapeutic modalities and most importantly, to depoliticize healthcare and allow for a more manageable way to finance it. In addition, it was important that the plan was completely portable throughout the country and did not depend on income, age or employment status.

The group started with an evidence-guided tiered system of healthcare delivery based on the question, “why can’t we build a healthcare system that covers everyone for life saving or death preventing services, and allows them to ‘buy up’ to higher levels of coverage if they want it.

The plan continued to develop, as the group grew and attracted people of many disciplines involved in the healthcare system. As the distance between members grew, discussions were mostly conducted by email, blog posts and telephone. Among the many issues that were discussed during this time, many felt that the plan should have a catchy name. Several proposals for names were submitted and the group voted for Dr, Kimberly Yonkers’ contribution: The Expanding Medical and Behavioral Resources with Access to Care for Everyone (EMBRACE) Health Plan.

In the beginning of 2008, with most of the elements of the plan now shaping up, the group began to discuss how to make the plan public. It was felt by most of the members that it should attempt to involve the medical community, and so it should be handled as other medical information- through a prominent medical journal. A writing group was assembled that covered expertise in a spectrum of issues including preventative medicine, public health, medical informatics and business administration.

== Publication of the EMBRACE healthcare system reform plan ==
Since most of the principles of the EMBRACE plan were similar at the time to those declared by the president of the American College of Physicians (ACP), the manuscript was submitted to the Annals of Internal Medicine, the ACP's medical journal. It was rejected because it was not considered a suitable subject for the medical journal. The manuscript was subsequently rejected by 2 other journals for similar reasons. The group now began discussing publishing EMBRACE in non-medical journals, especially ‘health policy’ journals that may be more receptive to the subject matter, but may have very few doctors reading the plan. Just as the group was ready to submit the manuscript to such a journal, the Annals of Internal Medicine contacted the group and asked it to resubmit a substantially shorter version of the manuscript (half the original size).

After going for peer review and some modifications, the final manuscript was accepted in November 2008, put online in early March and published on April 7, 2009. In the accompanying editorial, the editors explained that HPfHR is one of the groups that ‘are actively thinking about the issue’, and invited their readers to join in the healthcare reform debate. The Annals received and subsequently published 4 letters from readers about EMBRACE in the November 3, 2009, issue of the journal, along with a response from members of HPfHR.

== EMBRACE after PPACA ==
The full publication of EMBRACE came too late for the debate on healthcare insurance reform in the 111th Congress that eventually led to the Patient Protection and Affordable Care Act (PPACA); and in the ensuing storm that developed around this new legislation, any discussion about the EMBRACE plan was drowned out.

== See also ==
- Health care reform debate in the United States
