= Jazzy Belle =

Single by Outkast

from the album ATLiens
- Released: April 1997
- Genre: Alternative hip-hop; R&B
- Length: 4:12
- Label: LaFace; Arista; RCA
- Songwriters: Antwan Patton; André Benjamin
- Producer: Organized Noize

Outkast singles chronology
"ATLiens" / "Wheelz of Steel" (1996)	"Jazzy Belle" (1997)	"Black Ice" (1998)

"Jazzy Belle" is the third and last single from hip hop duo Outkast's second studio album, ATLiens. It was released as a remix single and it peaked at number 52 on the Billboard Hot 100. The song is the only single from the album ATLiens to be produced by Organized Noize, the other two singles being produced by Outkast themselves.

The rapper Tupac Shakur is mentioned in Verse Two by Big Boi. American rapper Ludacris claims he tried to sneak in to the music video for the song but was escorted out. Kenneth "Babyface" Edmonds provides back up vocals on the Swift C's Remix.

Big Boi has claimed that he didn't like the production on "Jazzy Belle", but André 3000 was so enthusiastic with the track that he went along with it. They also, allegedly, had an argument about whether or not to release the track as a single, but, ultimately, André 3000 "talked some sense into [him]". This was later revealed to be Andre bribing Big Boi with cash. This amount was also "nothing compared to what Andre got". Big Boi spoke about this in a 1999 interview where the main topic was Andre and his "weirdness".

== Track listing ==
Promotional Single

1. "Jazzy Belle" (Clean Version) – 4:12
2. "Jazzy Belle" (Album Instrumental) – 4:12

CD Single

1. "Jazzy Belle" (Album Version) – 4:13
2. "Jazzy Belle" (Swift C's Remix) – 4:14

Maxi Single

1. "Jazzy Belle" (Swift C's Remix) – 4:14
2. "ATLiens" (Hoff's Radio Edit) – 3:42
3. "Jazzy Belle" (Album Version) – 4:13
4. "Jazzy Belle" (Swift C's Instrumental) – 4:04
5. "Jazzy Belle" (Album Instrumental) – 4:12

12" Vinyl Single

1. "Jazzy Belle" (Swift C's Remix) – 4:14
2. "Jazzy Belle" (Swift C's Instrumental) – 4:02
3. "Jazzy Belle" (Swift C's Acapella) – 4:09
4. "Jazzy Belle" (Album Version) – 4:13
5. "Jazzy Belle" (Album Instrumental) – 4:12

== Charts ==
Chart (1997)	Peak position
US Billboard Hot 100	52
US Dance Singles Sales (Billboard)	11
US Hot R&B/Hip-Hop Songs (Billboard)	25
US Hot Rap Songs (Billboard)	7
