= Sweet Country Music =

Single by Atlanta

from the album Pictures
- B-side: "Seven Bridges Road"
- Released: February 13, 1984
- Genre: Country, country rock, bluegrass
- Length: 3:33
- Label: MCA
- Songwriter(s): Jeff Stevens, A.P. Carter, Terry Dotson, Dwaine Rowe
- Producer(s): Mylan Bodgen, Larry McBride

Atlanta singles chronology
"Dixie Dreaming" (1983)	"Sweet Country Music" (1984)	"Pictures" (1984)

"Sweet Country Music" is a song recorded by American country music group Atlanta. It was released in February 1984 as the third single from the band's first album, Pictures. It was their highest charting single, reaching No. 5 on the U.S. Billboard Hot Country Singles chart and peaking at number 2 on the Canadian RPM Country Tracks chart. It was written by Jeff Stevens, Terry Dotson and Dwaine Rowe.

== Content ==
The song is an up-tempo ode in the genre of country music. It begins in the key of G major with a chorus in the chord pattern G-D-F-C-G. Its verses follow the pattern G-F-C-B♭-G. At the bridge, the song modulates upward to A major, at which point the chorus of "Can the Circle Be Unbroken (By and By)" by A.P. Carter is incorporated. After this, the song resumes for one last chorus in the higher key.

== Chart performance ==
Chart (1984)	Peak position
US Hot Country Songs (Billboard)	5
Canadian RPM Country Tracks	2
