= Cell Therapy (song) =

1995 single by Goodie Mob

Single by Goodie Mob

from the album Soul Food
- B-side: "Soul Food"
- Released: September 26, 1995
- Recorded: 1994
- Genre: Hip hop
- Length: 4:37
- Label: LaFace
- Songwriters: Organized Noize, Cameron Gipp, Willie Knighton, Jr., Robert Barnett
- Producer: Organized Noize

Goodie Mob singles chronology
"Cell Therapy" (1995)	"Soul Food" (1996)

Music video
- "Cell Therapy" on YouTube

"Cell Therapy" is a song by American hip-hop group Goodie Mob, released as the lead single from their debut album, Soul Food (1995). Fellow Dungeon Family members Organized Noize produced the song. It became a top-40 hit, peaking at numbers 35 and 39 on the US Cash Box Top 100 and Billboard Hot 100 charts., and number one on the Billboard Hot Rap Singles chart. It remains the group's only single to reach the top 40. "Cell Therapy" has also appeared on Goodie Mob's greatest hits compilation Dirty South Classics and Cee Lo Green's Closet Freak: The Best of Cee-Lo Green the Soul Machine.

== Track listing ==
=== A-side ===
1. "Cell Therapy" (album version) – 4:43
2. "Cell Therapy" (album version clean) – 4:19
3. "Cell Therapy" (album instrumental) – 4:43

=== B-side ===
1. "Cell Therapy" (Sideeq Remix) – 4:43
2. "Cell Therapy" (a cappella) – 4:17
3. "Soul Food" (album version) – 3:56
4. "Benz or Beamer" – 4:15 (Bonus track performed by Outkast)

== Charts ==
=== Weekly charts ===
Chart (1995–1996)	Peak position
US Billboard Hot 100	39
US Hot R&B/Hip-Hop Songs (Billboard)	17
US Hot Rap Songs (Billboard)	1
US R&B/Hip-Hop Airplay (Billboard)	32
US Cash Box Top 100	35

=== Year-end charts ===
Chart (1996)	Position
US Hot R&B Singles Sales (Billboard)	65
US Hot Rap Singles (Billboard)	20
