= Dixie Dreaming =

Single by Atlanta

from the album Pictures
- B-side: "Orange Blossom Special/Rocky Top"
- Released: September 1983
- Genre: Country
- Length: 3:43
- Label: MDJ
- Songwriter(s): John Gilbert
- Producer(s): Mylan Bodgen, Larry McBride

Atlanta singles chronology
| "Atlanta Burned Again Last Night" (1983) | "Dixie Dreaming" (1983) | "Sweet Country Music" (1984) |

"Dixie Dreaming" is a song written by John Gilbert and recorded by American country music group Atlanta. It was released in September 1983 through MDJ Records and later appeared on the band's MCA Records album Pictures. The song reached number 11 on the U.S. Billboard Hot Country Singles chart.

== Chart performance ==
| Chart (1983) | Peak position |
|---|---|
| US Hot Country Songs (Billboard) | 11 |
