= Brainchild (Society of Soul album) =

Studio album by Society of Soul
- Released: June 27, 1995 (US)
- Recorded: 1994–1995
- Studio: Bosstown Recording Studios; Purple Dragon Recording Studios; Doppler Studios; Curtom Recording Studios (Atlanta, Georgia)
- Genre: Soul; funk
- Length: 50:22
- Label: LaFace
- Producer: L.A. Reid (exec.); Organized Noize (also exec.)

Singles from Brainchild
- 1. "Pushin'" Released: August 22, 1995; 2. "E.M.B.R.A.C.E. (Da Da Dah Dah)" Released: April 15, 1996

Professional ratings
Review scores
Source	Rating
AllMusic	2.5/5 stars

Brainchild is the only studio album by American group Society of Soul, composed of the production team Organized Noize, singer Esparonza Brown and poet Big Rube. It was released on LaFace Records in 1995. The album peaked at #93 on the Top R&B/Hip-Hop Albums chart in the United States.

JazzTimes called the album "shamefully ignored," and described it as an "aural trip through the soul of urban Atlanta."

== Track listing ==
- Credits adapted from liner notes.
1. "Genesis (Intro)"
2. "E.M.B.R.A.C.E."
3. "Changes" (featuring T-Boz)
4. "It Only Gets Better"
5. "Brainchild (Interlude)"
6. "Brainchild"
7. "Ghetto Fuh Life"
8. "Right Tonight"
9. "Judas (Interlude)"
10. "Pushin'"
11. "Migratention"
12. "Sonja Marie (Interlude)"
13. "Wind"
14. "Blac Mermaid" (featuring Cee-Lo Green and George Clinton)
15. "Peaches N' Erb"
16. "No Hard Feelings (Outro)"

== Charts ==
Chart (1996)	Peak position
US Top R&B/Hip-Hop Albums (Billboard)	93
