= Player's Ball =

Single by Outkast

from the album A LaFace Family Christmas and Southernplayalisticadillacmuzik
- Released: November 19, 1993
- Recorded: 1993
- Genre: Hip hop; G-funk
- Length: 4:21
- Label: LaFace; Arista; RCA
- Songwriters: André Benjamin; Patrick Brown; Ray Murray; Antwan Patton; Rico Wade
- Producer: Organized Noize

Outkast singles chronology
"Player's Ball" (1993)	"Southernplayalisticadillacmuzik" (1994)

Music video
- "Player's Ball" on YouTube

"Player's Ball" is the debut single from American hip hop duo Outkast. Originally released two weeks prior on the compilation A LaFace Family Christmas, the single was released on November 19, 1993 by LaFace, Arista and RCA, to promote the forthcoming debut album, Southernplayalisticadillacmuzik (1994). The song itself discusses the nature of living in the South of the United States, and growing up within a hip hop culture. The accompanying music video was directed by Sean "Puff Daddy" Combs.

The title refers to a traditional gathering of pimps in Atlanta. The song is referenced at least three times within other songs by the duo, including the final track on the debut album, the title track of the debut album, and a later single, "Elevators (Me & You)". The song peaked at #37 on the Billboard Hot 100, making it the highest-charting single from the group's debut album.

When Outkast made a guest appearance on Martin in the February 1995 episode All The Players Came, they also performed the song during the credits. The song was later featured in the 2002 film 8 Mile.

== Commercial performance ==
The single was certified gold on May 12, 1994, selling over 500,000 copies.

== Track listing ==
- CD single
1. "Player's Ball" (Radio Edit) – 3:56
2. "Player's Ball" (Album Version) – 4:22
3. "Player's Ball" (TV Mix) – 4:23
4. "Player's Ball" (Video Version) – 4:14
- Cassette single
1. "Player's Ball" (Radio Edit) – 3:56
2. "Player's Ball" (Album Version) – 4:22
3. "Player's Ball" (Instrumental) – 4:14
4. "Player's Ball" (TV Mix) – 4:23
- 12" vinyl single
1. "Player's Ball" (Extended Version) – 6:00
2. "Player's Ball" (Radio Edit – Dirty) – 3:56
3. "Player's Ball" (Radio Edit – Clean) – 4:23
4. "Player's Ball" (Remix Version) – 4:27
5. "Player's Ball" (Instrumental) – 4:14
- 10" 20th Anniversary EP (green vinyl)
1. "Players Ball" (Dirty Version) – 4:21
2. "Players Ball" (Extended Version) – 6:18
3. "Ain't No Thang – 5:38
4. "Crumblin' Erb" – 5:09

== Personnel ==
- André 3000 – vocals
- Big Boi – vocals
- Organized Noize – keyboards, programming, drum programming, producer, mixing engineer
- Edward Strout – guitar
- Preston Crump – bass

== Charts ==
=== Weekly charts ===
Chart (1994)	Peak position
US Billboard Hot 100	37
US Dance Singles Sales (Billboard)	6
US Hot R&B/Hip-Hop Songs (Billboard)	12
US Hot Rap Songs (Billboard)	1
US R&B/Hip-Hop Airplay (Billboard)	52

=== Year-end charts ===
Chart (1994)	Position
US Hot R&B/Hip-Hop Songs (Billboard)	64
US Maxi-Singles Sales (Billboard)	50

== Certifications ==
Region	Certification	Certified units/sales
United States (RIAA)	Gold	500,000^{^}
^{^} Shipments figures based on certification alone.
