= Pictures (Atlanta album) =

Studio album by Atlanta
- Released: March 27, 1984
- Recorded: 1983
- Genre: Country
- Label: MDJ/MCA
- Producer: Milan Bogden, Larry McBride

Atlanta chronology
Pictures (1984)	Atlanta (1985)

Singles from Pictures
- 1. "Atlanta Burned Again Last Night" Released: May 1983; 2. "Dixie Dreaming" Released: September 1983; 3. "Sweet Country Music" Released: February 13, 1984

Professional ratings
Review scores
Source	Rating
AllMusic	4/5 stars

Pictures is an album by American country music group Atlanta. It was released in March 1984. The album peaked at No. 8 on the Top Country Albums charts and number 140 on the U.S. Billboard 200. The biggest hit on the album, and also one of Atlanta's biggest hits, was "Sweet Country Music", which reached No. 5 on the Hot Country Singles & Tracks charts. Also on the US Country charts, the first single, "Atlanta Burned Again Last Night", peaked at No. 9, the second single "Dixie Dreaming" peaked at No. 11, the title track "Pictures" peaked at No. 35, and "Wishful Drinkin'" peaked at No. 22.

Both "Atlanta Burned Again Last Night" and "Sweet Country Music" were co-written by Jeff Stevens and Terry Dotson, who recorded for Atlantic Records as part of Jeff Stevens & the Bullets at the time.

== Track listing ==
1. "Dixie Dreaming" (John Gilbert) – 3:43
2. "Wishful Drinkin'" (Blake Mevis, Bill Shore) – 2:44
3. "Pictures" (Carol Halupke, Rex Gosdin) - 4:08
4. "Sweet Was Our Rose" (Ken Leray, Roger Spooner) - 4:01
5. "Blue Side of the Gray" (Lou T. Josie) - 5:16
6. "Atlanta Burned Again Last Night" (Jeff Stevens, Terry Dotson, Dwaine Rowe) – 2:59
7. "Sweet Country Music" (Stevens, Dotson, Rowe, A.P. Carter) – 3:33
8. "(Nothing Left Between Us) But Alabama" (Larry Latimer, Red Lane) - 3:09
9. "You Are the Wine" (Gilbert) - 3:21
10. "Long Cool Woman in a Black Dress" (Allan Clarke, Roger Cook, Roger Greenaway) - 3:35

== Charts ==
=== Weekly charts ===
Chart (1984)	Peak position
Canadian Country Albums (RPM)	6
US Billboard 200	140
US Top Country Albums (Billboard)	8

=== Year-end charts ===
Chart (1984)	Position
US Top Country Albums (Billboard)	35
