= Watch for the Hook =

Single by Cool Breeze featuring Outkast, Goodie Mob and Witchdoctor

from the album East Point's Greatest Hit
- Released: December 1, 1998
- Studio: Tree Sound Studios (Atlanta, GA); DARP Studios (Atlanta, GA); The Dungeon Recording Studios (Atlanta, GA)
- Genre: Hip hop
- Label: Interscope
- Songwriters: Frederick Bell; André Benjamin; Erin Johnson; Thomas Callaway; Willie Knighton; Cameron Gipp; Antwan Patton; Robert Barnett; Ruben Bailey; Patrick Brown; Rico Wade; Ray Murray; Neil Young
- Producer: Organized Noize

Cool Breeze singles chronology
"Dirty South" (1995)	"Watch for the Hook" (1998)	"Cre-A-Tine (I Got People...)" (1999)

Outkast singles chronology
"Skew It on the Bar-B" (1998)	"Watch for the Hook" (1998)	"Rosa Parks" (1999)

Goodie Mob singles chronology
"Black Ice (Sky High)" (1998)	"Watch for the Hook" (1998)	"Get Rich to This" (1999)

Witchdoctor singles chronology
"Holiday" (1997)	"Watch for the Hook" (1998)	"I Got What Clint Got / I Remember When" (1999)

Music video
- "Watch For The Hook" on YouTube

Professional ratings
Review scores
Source	Rating
AllMusic	2/5 stars

"Watch for the Hook" is a posse cut song by American Atlanta-based Southern hip hop collective Dungeon Family. It was released on December 1, 1998, via Organized Noize/Interscope Records as a lead single from member Cool Breeze debut studio album East Point's Greatest Hit. It was written by André 3000, Witchdoctor, CeeLo Green, Khujo, Big Gipp, Big Boi, T-Mo, Cool Breeze, Big Rube, and Organized Noize, who produced the song using samples from Merry Clayton's cover version of Neil Young's "Southern Man".

The single peaked at number 73 on the Billboard Hot 100, number 18 on the Hot R&B/Hip-Hop Songs, number 48 on the R&B/Hip-Hop Airplay and topped the Hot Rap Songs chart in the United States.

== Critical reception ==
Nathan Rabin of The A.V. Club called "Watch for the Hook" "the best song on the album". Matthew Ismael Ruiz of Pitchfork wrote: "André 3000 only has six bars, but opens the track like a shotgun blast; Cee-Lo and Khjuo try to outpace each other as they trade rapid-fire blows; and T-Mo breaks down the door, Kramer-style, with a barely decipherable verse that nonetheless reveals its complexity on a lyrics sheet. T-Mo might have the best verse, but Witchdoctor, Big Gipp, Big Boi… each comes correct with unique verses, varying pitch, cadence, and flow. Right up until the final verse, from the man whose name is on the song. The big mistake here was the conceit that Cool Breeze was on the same level as the Dungeon Family. With a plodding pace, basic AABB rhyme scheme, and bland imagery, he manages to say the least with the most airtime. It's almost as if he knows it, choosing to repeat the last four bars four times to close out the track".

== Track listing ==
Maxi-Single CD
No.	Title	Writer(s)	Length
1.	"Watch For The Hook (Dungeon Family Mix)"	Frederick Bell; André Benjamin; Erin Johnson; Thomas Callaway; Willie Knighton; Cameron Gipp; Antwan Patton; Robert Barnett; Ruben Bailey; Organized Noize; Neil Young
2.	"Watch For The Hook (Remix)"
3.	"Watch For The Hook (Vibe Remix)"
4.	"Hit Man"	Bell; Johnson; Jamahr Williams; Organized Noize
5.	"Watch For The Hook (Instrumental)"
6.	"Watch For The Hook (Remix Instrumental)"

== Personnel ==
"Watch For The Hook"

- Andre "André 3000" Benjamin – songwriter, first verse
- Erin "Witchdoctor" Johnson – songwriter, second verse
- Thomas "CeeLo Green" Callaway – songwriter, third verse
- Willie "Khujo" Knighton – songwriter, third verse
- Cameron "Big Gipp" Gipp – songwriter, fourth verse
- Antwan "Big Boi" Patton – songwriter, fifth verse
- Robert "T-Mo" Barnett – songwriter, sixth verse
- Frederick "Cool Breeze" Bell – songwriter, seventh verse, outro
- Organized Noize – songwriters, keyboard programming, producers
- Ruben "Big Rube" Bailey – songwriter
- Neil Young – songwriter
- John "Bernasky" Wall – engineering
- Brian Smith – engineering
- Alvin Speights – mixing
- JR Rodriguez – mixing assistant

"Hit Man"

- Erin "Witchdoctor" Johnson – songwriter, intro, second verse, backing vocals, outro
- Frederick "Cool Breeze" Bell – songwriter, first verse
- Jamahr "Backbone" Williams – songwriter, chorus, third verse
- Organized Noize – songwriters, programming, producers
- Richard Muscadin – trombone
- Antoine Hollins – tuba
- Skinny Miracles – backing vocals
- John "Bernasky" Wall – engineering
- Alvin Speights – mixing
- JR Rodriguez – mixing assistant

== Charts ==
Chart (1998)	Peak position
US Billboard Hot 100	73
US Hot R&B/Hip-Hop Songs (Billboard)	18
US R&B/Hip-Hop Airplay (Billboard)	48
US Hot Rap Songs (Billboard)	1
