= Jeff Stevens (singer) =

American country music singer, songwriter, producer

- Born: Jeffery David Stevens; June 15, 1959 (age 67); Alum Creek, West Virginia, U.S.
- Origin: Nashville, Tennessee, U.S.
- Genres: Country
- Occupations: Singer; songwriter; record producer
- Instruments: Vocals; guitar
- Years active: 1975–present
- Label: Atlantic
- Formerly of: Jeff Stevens and the Bullets

Jeffery David Stevens (born June 15, 1959) is an American country music singer, songwriter and record producer. He recorded two albums on Atlantic America Records with his brother Warren Stevens and Terry Dotson as Jeff Stevens and the Bullets, and later as a solo artist on the Atlantic label. Since the early 1990s, Stevens has largely worked as a songwriter and producer for other artists.

== Biography ==
Stevens was born in Alum Creek, West Virginia. At age nine, he and his brother Warren entered a talent contest and won first place. Eventually, they and cousin Terry Dotson formed a band called Jeff Stevens and the Bullets, with Jeff on lead vocals and guitar, Warren on bass guitar, Dotson on drums, and Jim Mayo on rhythm guitar and harmonica. The band recorded Bolt Out of the Blue for Atlantic America Records in 1986, which accounted for the singles "Darlington County" (a cover of the Bruce Springsteen song), "You're in Love Alone" and "Geronimo's Cadillac." A fourth chart single, "Johnny Lucky and Suzi 66," led off a second self-titled album. In the mid-1980s, Jeff Stevens and Dotson co-wrote Atlanta's singles "Atlanta Burned Again Last Night" and "Sweet Country Music."

The Bullets broke up in 1990 and Stevens remained on Atlantic as a solo artist, working with record producer Keith Stegall for a solo debut album which was never released. From there, Stevens found work as a songwriter, writing a string of hits including the singles "I Fell in the Water" by John Anderson, "Down in Flames" by Blackhawk, the number one hit "Reckless" for Alabama, and "Big Love" and "I Wanna Feel That Way Again" for Tracy Byrd. George Strait also recorded Stevens' "Carried Away," "Carrying Your Love with Me" and "True," the first two of which went to number one as well. Stevens had another number one in 2004 with Tim McGraw's "Back When."

In 1999, Stevens began work as a record producer, co-producing Jerry Kilgore's debut album Love Trip. Among other acts Stevens produces Luke Bryan, and co-wrote Bryan's singles "All My Friends Say", "Someone Else Calling You Baby" (which went to number one in early 2011), and "Kiss Tomorrow Goodbye", also a number one hit for Bryan in late 2012.

== Jeff Stevens and the Bullets discography ==
=== Albums ===
Year	Album information
1986	Bolt Out of the Blue: Label: Atlantic America; Released: 1986; Format: LP, cassette
1990	Jeff Stevens and the Bullets: Label: Atlantic America; Released: March 1990; Format: LP, cassette

=== Singles ===
Year	Song	Peak chart positions	Album
Year	Song	US Country	Album
1987	"Darlington County"	69	Bolt Out of the Blue
1988	"You're in Love Alone"	61	Bolt Out of the Blue
1988	"Geronimo's Cadillac"	53	Bolt Out of the Blue
1989	"Johnny Lucky and Suzi 66"	70	Jeff Stevens and the Bullets
1990	"Boomtown"	—^{A}	Jeff Stevens and the Bullets
1990	"Roseanne"	—^{A}	Jeff Stevens and the Bullets
1990	"You Done Me Wrong (And That Ain't Right)"	—	Jeff Stevens and the Bullets

Notes:

- ^{A} "Boomtown" and "Roseanne" did not chart on Hot Country Songs, but both peaked at No. 6 on Hot Country Radio Breakouts.

=== Music videos ===
Year	Video	Director
1990	"Boomtown"	Deaton Flanigen
