= ATLiens / Wheelz of Steel =

"ATLiens" / "Wheelz of Steel"

Single by Outkast

from the album ATLiens
- Released: August 20, 1996
- Recorded: 1996
- Genre: Alternative hip hop
- Label: LaFace/RCA
- Songwriters: André Benjamin; Antwan Patton
- Producer: OutKast

Outkast singles chronology
"Elevators (Me & You)" (1996)	"ATLiens" / "Wheelz of Steel" (1996)	"Jazzy Belle" (1997)

Music video
- "ATLiens" on YouTube

"ATLiens" and "Wheelz of Steel" are two songs by American hip-hop duo OutKast, released as the second single from their second studio album, ATLiens (1996). Both songs were written and produced by OutKast. "ATLiens" as a separate entry peaked at number 35 on the Billboard Hot 100.

"ATLiens" is widely considered one of Outkast's best songs. In 2020, The Ringer ranked the song number three on their list of the 50 greatest Outkast songs. In 2021, The Guardian ranked the song number eight on their list of the 20 greatest Outkast songs.

== Track listing ==
CD single

1. "ATLiens" (Album Version) – 3:50
2. "Wheelz of Steel" (Album Version) – 4:03

Maxi-single

1. "ATLiens" (Album Version) – 3:50
2. "Wheelz of Steel" (Album Version) – 4:03
3. "ATLiens" (Instrumental) – 3:50
4. "Wheelz of Steel" (Instrumental) – 4:03

Atliens - Remix CD single

1. "ATLiens" (Bad Boy Remix) – 6:15
2. "ATLiens" (Bad Boy Instrumental) – 6:15
3. "ATLiens" (Bad Boy Alternative Mix) – 5:08
4. "Wheelz of Steel" (Remix) – 4:16

12" vinyl

1. "ATLiens" (Clean Version) – 3:50
2. "ATLiens" (Album Version) – 3:50
3. "ATLiens" (Album Instrumental) – 3:50
4. "ATLiens" (Album Acapella) – 3:58
5. "Wheelz of Steel" (Clean Version) – 4:03
6. "Wheelz of Steel" (Album Version) – 4:03
7. "Wheelz of Steel" (Album Instrumental) – 4:03
8. "Wheelz of Steel" (Album Acapella) – 4:12

== Charts ==
Chart performance for "ATLiens"
Chart (1996)	Peak position
US Billboard Hot 100	35
US Dance Singles Sales (Billboard)	8
US Hot R&B/Hip-Hop Songs (Billboard)	22
US Hot Rap Songs (Billboard)	3

== Certifications ==
Region	Certification	Certified units/sales
New Zealand (RMNZ)	Platinum	30,000^{‡}
United States (RIAA)	Platinum	1,000,000^{‡}
^{‡} Sales+streaming figures based on certification alone.
