= Southernplayalisticadillacmuzik (song) =

Single by Outkast

from the album Southernplayalisticadillacmuzik
- Released: June 20, 1994
- Recorded: 1994
- Genre: Hip hop
- Length: 5:18 (album version); 4:12 (radio edit)
- Label: LaFace; Arista; RCA
- Songwriter: Organized Noize
- Producer: Organized Noize

Outkast singles chronology
"Player's Ball" (1994)	"Southernplayalisticadillacmuzik" (1994)	"Git Up, Git Out" (1994)

"Southernplayalisticadillacmuzik" is a song by American hip hop duo Outkast, released on June 20, 1994 as the second single from their debut studio album of the same name. The title track managed to chart at #74 on the Billboard Hot 100, however failed to live up to the success of their previous single, "Player's Ball", which charted at #37 on that same chart.

== Track listing ==
CD single

1. "Southernplayalisticadillacmuzik" (Organised Extended Remix) – 5:47
2. "Southernplayalisticadillacmuzik" (LP Version) – 5:18
3. "Southernplayalisticadillacmuzik" (Diamond D Remix) – 4:55
4. "Southernplayalisticadillacmuzik" (Organised Instrumental) – 5:47

12-inch single

1. "Southernplayalisticadillacmuzik" (Organised Remix) – 6:54
2. "Southernplayalisticadillacmuzik" (Organised Instrumental) – 6:54
3. "Southernplayalisticadillacmuzik" (Diamond D Remix) – 7:05
4. "Southernplayalisticadillacmuzik" (Diamond D Instrumental) – 7:05

== Personnel ==
- André 3000 – vocals
- Big Boi – vocals
- Organized Noize – keyboards, programming, mixing engineer, producer
- Edwars Strout – guitar
- Preston Crump – bass
- Kenneth Wright – piano, organ
- Jeff Sparks – saxophone
- Society of Soul – background vocals
- Debra Killings – background vocals
- Brandon Bennet – background vocals
- Tony Hightower – background vocals
- Leslie Brathwaite – producer

== Charts ==
Chart (1994)	Peak position
US Billboard Hot 100	74
US Billboard Hot R&B/Hip-Hop Songs	41

== Certifications ==
Region	Certification	Certified units/sales
United States (RIAA)	Gold	500,000^{‡}
^{‡} Sales+streaming figures based on certification alone.
