= Black Ice (song) =

1998 single by Goodie Mob featuring Outkast

"Black Ice (Sky High)"

Single by Goodie Mob featuring Outkast

from the album Still Standing
- Released: June 7, 1998
- Genre: Hip hop
- Length: 3:25
- Label: LaFace
- Songwriters: Cameron Gipp; André Benjamin; Antwan Patton; David Sheats
- Producer: Mr. DJ

Goodie Mob singles chronology
"They Don't Dance No Mo'" (1998)	"Black Ice (Sky High)" (1998)	"Watch for the Hook" (1998)

Outkast singles chronology
"Jazzy Belle" (1997)	"Black Ice" (1998)	"Skew It on the Bar-B" (1998)

Music video
- "Black Ice (Sky High)" on YouTube

"Black Ice (Sky High)" is a song by American hip hop group Goodie Mob from their second studio album Still Standing (1998), released as its second single on June 7, 1998. The song features American hip hop duo Outkast and was produced by Mr. DJ.

There are two versions of the song. The first, titled "Black Ice (Sky High)", features verses from only Big Gipp and Outkast. The second features all members of the Goodie Mob as well as Outkast.

== Background ==
The instrumental of the song was originally intended for a remix to "Blackberry Molasses" by American R&B group Mista. When Big Gipp heard the beat, he began writing lyrics to it. Gipp told MTV, "It was a song that I did in one night. I was [in the studio], just there playin' around and then came the hook and a verse. It came out so good and everybody was like 'It's jammin'." Gipp added that Outkast was "nearby working on their new album", and joined him, recording two new verses for the track.

== Composition ==
Jonathan Zwickel of Pitchfork described the song as "a sparse, psychedelic warning against the perils of dealing near your neighbor." The song is notable for an imitation of the speech "Friends, Romans, countrymen, lend me your ears" from Julius Caesar by William Shakespeare, in the final verse rapped by André 3000.

== Charts ==
Chart (1998)	Peak position
US Billboard Hot 100	50
US Hot R&B/Hip-Hop Songs (Billboard)	48
US Hot Rap Songs (Billboard)	13
