= SWATS =

Southwestern Atlanta

SWATS, The S.W.A.T.S. or S.W.A.T.S. ("Southwest Atlanta, too strong") is, in street, hip-hop, or local contexts, Southwest Atlanta, plus territory extending into the adjacent cities of College Park and East Point. The term "SWATS" came into vogue around 1996 and was initially made popular by LaFace Records groups OutKast and Goodie Mob. This was the same time that "ATL" became popular as a nickname for Atlanta as a whole.

The term is relevant not just as an identifier for Southwest Atlanta but as a cultural icon embedded in rap lyrics and names of musical and other groups, with reference not just to physical place but a culture and lifestyle.

== References to SWATS ==
=== Lyrics ===
The OutKast song "Peaches (Intro)" states: "For…the SWATS…Cause it ain't nuttin but King Shit, all day, err'day". Another Outkast song, "Ova da Wudz" states "put the SWATS, SWATS on your car."

Goodie Mob song "I Refuse Limitation" states "SWATS G.A. by way of Cascade Heights", while their song "Goodie Bag" states "Cause in da SWAT's red hots don't drip or bleed", and in "All A's", Cee Lo Green's chorus states "But don't you dare ride through the SWATS without, at least 30 shots".

Erick Sermon rapped "I'm in New York now but I represent the SWATS and A-Town.", in his song "Future Thug" from his sixth solo album 'Chilltown, New York' in 2004.

=== Media and artists named after SWATS ===
S.W.A.T.S. is the name of a 2010 web television series by Golden Street Entertainment taking place in Southwest Atlanta.

S.W.A.T.S. is the name of a song by rap group 9.17 on the album Southern Empire released by Motown in 2001.

Young Ju King of da SWATS is an artist featured on ReverbNation.

Also referenced as location of "Gina's Beauty Shop" in the movie "Beauty Shop" starring Queen Latifah.
