= Atlanta Burned Again Last Night =

Single by Atlanta

from the album Pictures
- B-side: "Tumbling Tumbleweeds"
- Released: May 1983
- Genre: Country
- Length: 2:59
- Label: MDJ
- Songwriters: Jeff Stevens, Terry Dotson, Dwaine Rowe
- Producers: Mylan Bodgen, Larry McBride

Atlanta singles chronology
"Atlanta Burned Again Last Night" (1983)	"Dixie Dreaming" (1983)

"Atlanta Burned Again Last Night" is a song recorded by American country music group Atlanta. It was released in May 1983 as their debut single and the first from their debut album Pictures. The song reached No. 9 on the U.S. Billboard Hot Country Singles chart It was written by Jeff Stevens, Terry Dotson and Dwaine Rowe. Released through Larry McBride's MDJ label, it was one of the highest-charting debut singles by an independently signed country act.

== Content ==
The song narrates a teenage boy's sexual initiation by a married woman. Here, a 17-year-old boy (depicted as "dating a high school queen") meets and begins a relationship with a woman who is "over 30," in her second marriage and having a son that was nearly as old as her teenaged partner. The lyrics focused on the intimacy shared between the two, and the satisfaction each of them takes from the encounter ("He made her feel needed/And she made him a man").

== Chart performance ==
Chart (1983)	Peak position
US Hot Country Songs (Billboard)	9
