= Soul Food (song) =

1996 single by Goodie Mob featuring Sleepy Brown

Single by Goodie Mob featuring Sleepy Brown

from the album Soul Food
- Released: February 26, 1996
- Recorded: 1995
- Genre: Conscious hip hop, Southern hip hop
- Length: 3:56
- Label: LaFace
- Songwriters: Robert Barnett, Brandon Bennett, Marc Benno, Bill Boatman, Thomas Callaway, Cameron Gipp, Willie Knighton, Pigmeat Markham, Leon Russell, Rico Wade, Ray Murray, Patrick Brown
- Producer: Organized Noize

Goodie Mob singles chronology
"Cell Therapy" (1995)	"Soul Food" (1996)	"Dirty South" (1996)

Sleepy Brown singles chronology
"Soul Food" (1996)	"Saturday (Oooh! Ooooh!)" (2002)

Music video
- "Soul Food" on YouTube

"Soul Food" is a song by American hip hop group Goodie Mob and the title track from their debut studio album of the same name (1995). It was released in February 1996 by LaFace Records as the album's second single. It features American singer-songwriter Sleepy Brown and was produced by Organized Noize. "Soul Food" peaked at numbers 64 and 67 on the US Billboard Hot 100 and Cash Box Top 100 charts.

== Content ==
In the song, each member of Goodie Mob describes their favorite foods and love for the titular cuisine style, and point out how fast food is often bad for one's health.

== Critical reception ==
Tom Doggett of RapReviews called the song "stunning", commenting it "puts you right next to them at the table" and that "The understated beat emphasizes the vocals, and when they sing the chorus together, it is truly beautiful."

== Charts ==
Chart (1996)	Peak position
US Billboard Hot 100	64
US Hot R&B/Hip-Hop Songs (Billboard)	31
US Hot Rap Songs (Billboard)	7
US Cash Box Top 100	67
