= Dirty South (song) =

Single by Goodie Mob featuring Big Boi and Cool Breeze

Single by Goodie Mob featuring Big Boi and Cool Breeze

from the album Soul Food
- Released: August 6, 1996
- Recorded: 1995
- Studio: Purple Dragon Studios (Atlanta, GA); Bosstown Recording Studios (Atlanta, GA)
- Genre: Southern hip hop
- Length: 3:34
- Label: LaFace
- Songwriters: Cameron Gipp; Antwan Patton; Frederick Bell; Patrick Brown; Rico Wade; Ray Murray
- Producer: Organized Noize

Goodie Mob singles chronology
| "Soul Food" (1996) | "Dirty South" (1996) | "They Don't Dance No Mo'" (1998) |

Big Boi singles chronology
| "Dirty South" (1996) | "All n My Grill" (1999) |

Cool Breeze singles chronology
| "Dirty South" (1996) | "Watch for the Hook" (1999) |

Music video
- "Dirty South" on YouTube

"Dirty South" is a song by American hip hop group Goodie Mob featuring American rappers and fellow Dungeon Family members Big Boi and Cool Breeze. It was released on August 6, 1996 via LaFace Records as the third single from Goodie Mob's debut studio album Soul Food (1995). Recording sessions took place at Purple Dragon Studios and Bosstown Recording Studios in Atlanta. Production was handled by Organized Noize, who also served as executive producers together with Babyface and L.A. Reid. The song popularised the titular phrase, which has since been used to refer to Southern hip hop.

The single peaked at number 92 on the Billboard 200, number 53 on the Hot R&B/Hip-Hop Songs and number 8 on the Hot Rap Songs charts in the United States. It was later included in the group's 2003 greatest hits album Dirty South Classics.

== Content ==
The song takes on a gritty theme and deals with life in the streets, such as sex trafficking, with mentions of certain people and places.

== Critical reception ==
Tom Doggett of RapReviews wrote "'Dirty South,' the unofficial anthem, ups the ante. For starters, the beat is one of the most involving, head-nodding works in all of rap history. Organized Noize has quite a track record, but this is certainly near the top." In regard to the overall performance, he wrote "By name-dropping and mentioning specific places, they manage to put the listener right there with them. The crown jewel of the song, though, is the chorus, which is guaranteed to have you singing along by the second time through."

== Track listing ==
| No. | Title | Length |
|---|---|---|
| 1. | "Dirty South" (Clean Version) |
| 2. | "Dirty South" (Instrumental) |
| 3. | "Dirty South" (Acapella Clean Version) |

== Personnel ==
- Cameron "Big Gipp" Gipp – songwriter, lead and backing vocals, creative director
- Antwan "Big Boi" Patton – songwriter, lead vocals
- Frederick "Cool Breeze" Bell – songwriter, lead and backing vocals
- Patrick "Sleepy" Brown – songwriter, drum and keyboards programming, producer, executive producer
- Rico Wade – songwriter, drum and keyboards programming, producer, executive producer
- Ray Murray – songwriter, drum and keyboards programming, producer, executive producer
- Thomas "CeeLo Green" Callaway – backing vocals, creative director
- Willie "Khujo" Knighton – backing vocals, creative director
- Robert "T-Mo" Barnett – backing vocals, creative director
- Colin Wolfe – guitar
- Neal H Pogue – recording and mixing
- John "Bernasky" Wall – recording
- Tim Harrington – recording
- Ricciano "Ricco" Lumpkins – mixing assistant
- Herb Powers Jr. – mastering
- Kenneth "Babyface" Edmonds – executive producer
- Antonio "L.A. Reid" Reid – executive producer
- Darrick L. Warfield – art direction, design
- Nigel Sawyer – design
- Kawan Prather – A&R
- Dee Dee Hibbler – A&R
- Sharon Daley – A&R

== Charts ==
| Chart (1996) | Peak position |
|---|---|
| US Billboard Hot 100 | 92 |
| US Hot R&B/Hip-Hop Songs (Billboard) | 53 |
| US Hot Rap Songs (Billboard) | 8 |
