= EMBRACE =

EMBRACE (European Model for Bioinformatics Research and Community Education) was a project established in 2005 consisting of a consortium of 18 european institutions to develop bioinformatics tools and web-services in the life sciences domain in an unified manner. The project concluded in 2010, having produced almost 1000 services across with diverse applications including traditional programs, such as BLAST and ClustalW, and domain-specific tools and resources, such as metabolite substructure prediction or prediction of protein stabilization. The tools were published in a centralized registry.

Integration efforts were driven by a set of test problems representing key issues for bioinformatics service providers and end-user biologists. EMBRACE made many bioinformatics web services available to the international research community. As a result, groups throughout Europe were able to use the EMBRACE service interfaces for their own local or proprietary data and tools. The project was run from the EBI in Hinxton, England. Fred Marcus was its EU project coordinator.

The registry, data, and methods developed as part of EMBRACE were used to create EDAM ("EMBRACE Data and Methods"), an ontology of bioinformatics operations (tool or workflow functions), types of data and identifiers, application domains and data formats.

The EMBRACE project was funded by the European Commission within its FP6 Programme, under the thematic area "Life sciences, genomics, and biotechnology for health."
