= Atlanta (band) =

American country music band

Background information
- Origin: Nashville, Tennessee, U.S.
- Genres: Country
- Years active: 1982–1988
- Labels: MDJ/MCA, Southern Tracks
- Past members: Jeff Baker; Allen Collay; Alan David; Bill Davidson; John Holder; Tony Ingram; Brad Griffis; Bill Packard; Dick Stevens; Darrell McAfee; Jody Worrell

Atlanta was an American country music band formed in 1982 in Nashville, Tennessee. Between 1983 and 1988, Atlanta recorded two albums for MDJ Records and charted nine singles on the Billboard Hot Country Singles (now Hot Country Songs) charts. This total includes the singles "Atlanta Burned Again Last Night" and "Sweet Country Music" which both reached Top 10.

== History ==
Atlanta was formed in 1982 by Brad Griffis (bass guitar), Bill Davidson (vocals, rhythm guitar), Tony Ingram (vocals, fiddle), Alan David (lead guitar), Allen Collay (keyboards), Bill Packard (keyboards), Jeff Baker (harmonica), Dick Stevens (bass), and John Holder (drums). Prior to the foundation, Ingram had recorded on Epic Records in the band Spurzz, and Stevens, Davidson, Griffis, and David had previously toured as a re-establishment of The Vogues. The group was founded through the assistance of record producer Larry McBride, who had also launched the career of Alabama. With nine members, Atlanta was the largest country music band at the time.

"Atlanta Burned Again Last Night" was the band's debut single, released in 1983 on the independent MDJ record label, which McBride owned. This recording spent seventeen weeks on the Billboard country singles chart, peaking at #9. This single was one of the highest-charting debut singles by an independently signed country music act.

After it came the #11 "Dixie Dreaming", the band's second and final MDJ release. By early 1984, MCA Records assumed promotion of the band's singles and albums, releasing "Sweet Country Music" early in the year. It became the band's highest-charting hit, reaching #5 on the Billboard country chart. MCA released the band's debut album Pictures in 1984. MCA also released the singles "Pictures" and "Wishful Drinkin'", the latter of which was included in the film Ellie.

Before releasing the second album, Holder had left and Darrell "Boo Boo" McAfee joins on drums. Atlanta released its self-titled second album for MCA in 1985. It included the singles "My Sweet-Eyed Georgia Girl" and "Why Not Tonight", both of which peaked outside the Country Top 40. The band later moved to the Southern Tracks label as Davidson and David left and David was replaced by Jody Worrell on guitar, and releasing "We Always Agree on Love" and "Sad Clichés".

Allen Collay (born Allen Callais on January 1, 1943, in New Orleans) died on February 16, 2010, at age 67.

== Discography ==
=== Studio albums ===
Title	Album details	Peak chart positions		
Title	Album details	US Country	US	CAN Country
Pictures	Release date: March 27, 1984; Label: MDJ/MCA Records; Formats: LP, cassette	8	140	6
Atlanta	Release date: May 1985; Label: MDJ/MCA Records; Formats: LP, cassette	33	—	—
"—" denotes releases that did not chart

=== Singles ===
Year	Single	Peak chart positions		Album
Year	Single	US Country	CAN Country	Album
1983	"Atlanta Burned Again Last Night"	9	—	Pictures
1983	"Dixie Dreaming"	11	—	Pictures
1984	"Sweet Country Music"	5	2	Pictures
1984	"Pictures"	35	31	Pictures
1984	"Wishful Drinkin'"	22	—	Pictures
1985	"My Sweet-Eyed Georgia Girl"	57	—	Atlanta
1985	"Why Not Tonight"	58	—	Atlanta
1987	"We Always Agree on Love"	75	—	—N/a
1988	"Sad Cliches"	70	—	—N/a
"—" denotes releases that did not chart
