= Debra Killings =

American singer and bassist (born 1964)

- Born: July 7, 1964 (age 62); Atlanta, Georgia, U.S.
- Genres: R&B, hip-hop, gospel
- Occupations: Singer, songwriter, background vocalist
- Instruments: Vocals, bass, guitar
- Years active: 1990–present
- Labels: Rowdy Records, Verity Records, Hands Up Records Inc.
- Website: Website Debra Killings

Debra Killings (born July 7, 1964) is an American singer and bass guitarist, notable for extensive session and background vocal work for LaFace Records and Rowdy Records-based artists such as TLC, Monica, and Outkast.

Killings appears on the majority of the recordings in TLC's catalogue, singing background vocals. She also appears on Monica's first two albums (Miss Thang and The Boy is Mine), and has performed both background vocals and bass guitar on several OutKast albums, including ATLiens and Aquemini. Prior to her '90s renown, Killings was discovered by Klymaxx co-founder Joyce Irby and signed to MCA Records as the lead singer of group Princess & Starbreeze.

In 2002, Killings signed to Verity Records, and she released her debut solo album, a gospel LP entitled Surrender, in 2003. Killings was the singing voice of Paula Patton's character, Angel Davenport, in the film Idlewild. Killings' recognizable voice is spotlighted in "Moving Cool", the song that the character of Angel first performs in the movie.

== Television ==
Killings was a member of Big Jim's Penthouse Playas, the house band on The Mo'Nique Show. Killings also occasionally played bass in the house band for Showtime at the Apollo.

Killings also played bass for BET's "Black Girls Rock" all-star band.

== Personal life ==
Killings was born on July 7, 1964, and grew up in Atlanta, Georgia. She is married and has two sons.

== Discography ==
Album

With Princess & Starbreeze:

- Princess & Starbreeze (MCA, 1987)

With Modest Fok:

- Love or the Single Life (EastWest, 1992)

Solo albums

- Surrender (Verity, 2003)
- Open Heaven (Hands Up, 2008)

Singles

- "Message in the Music"
- "It's Gonna Be Lonely"
- "Love or the Single Life"

Other Appearances

- "Fled" Motion Picture Soundtrack (Rowdy, 1996)
- "13th Floor / Growing Old", Outkast on ATLiens (LaFace/Arista/BMG, 1996)
- Various songs, Outkast on Speakerboxxx/The Love Below (Arista/BMG, 2003)
- "Moving Cool", Outkast on Idlewild (LaFace/Jive, 2006)

== Awards and nominations ==
Year	Nominee / work	Award	Result	Ref.
1999	FanMail	Grammy Award for Album of the Year	Nominated	
