= Society of Soul =

R&B group

Society of Soul was a five-member R&B group that consisted of the members of Organized Noize (Sleepy Brown, Rico Wade and Ray Murray) as well as Espraronza and Big Rube.

== Discography ==
=== Albums ===
- Brainchild (1995)

=== Singles ===
- "Pushin'"
- "Embrace"
