= Doppler Studios =

Recording studio in Atlanta, Georgia

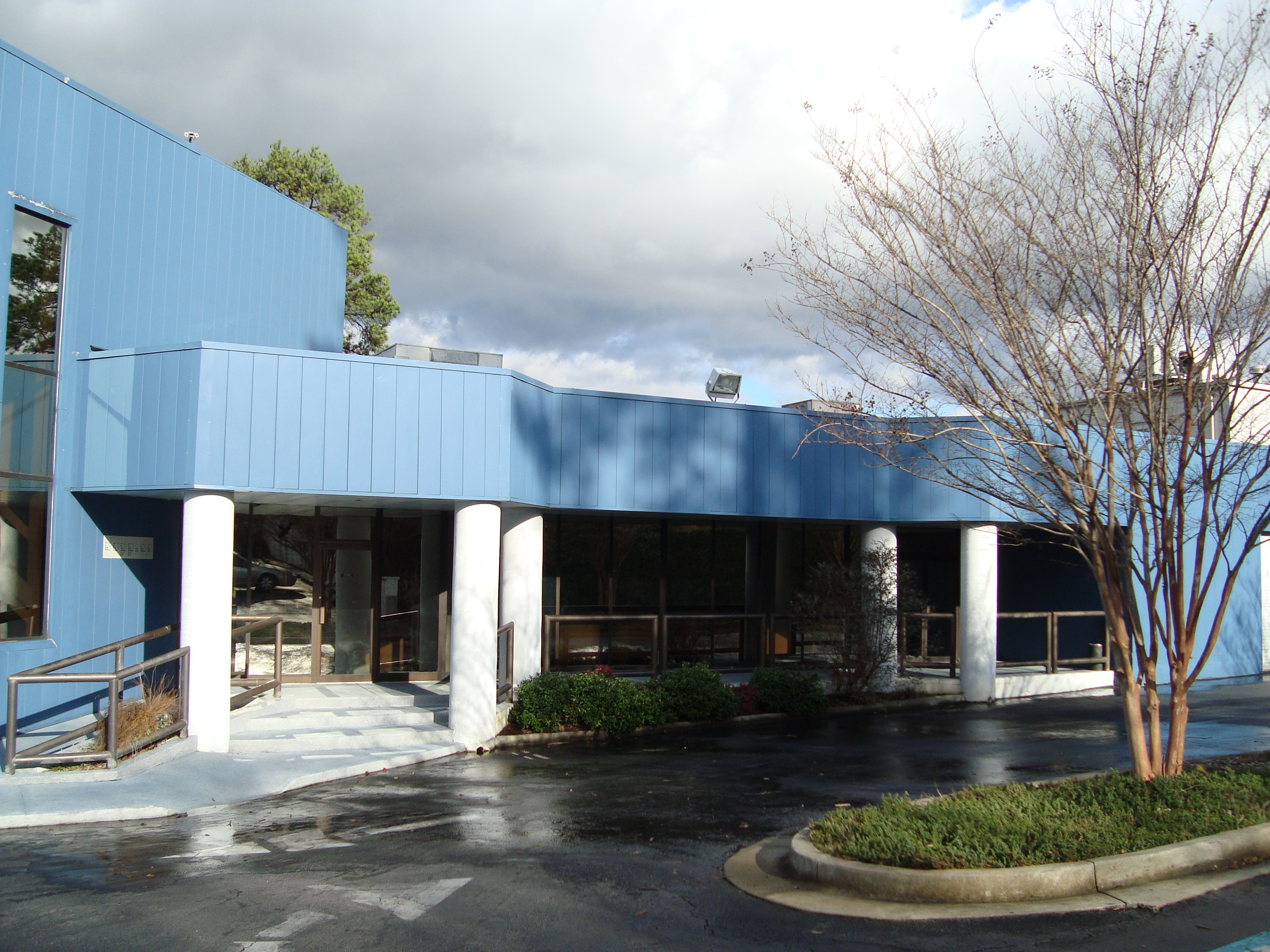
- Doppler Studios in 2009
- Interactive map of Doppler Studios
- Address: 1922 Piedmont Circle; Atlanta, Georgia 30324; United States
- Coordinates: 33°48′32″N 84°22′04″W
- Type: Recording studio

Construction
- Opened: 1969

Website
- www.dopplerstreamcutstudios.com

Doppler Studios is a recording studio in Atlanta, Georgia, United States, established in 1969 as a one-room studio, and grew to host seven rooms.

== History ==
Founded by original co-owners Pete Caldwell and Tom Wells to serve as their jingle company, Doppler was initially a single recording studio; in 1978 the move was made to the current location on Piedmont Circle into a building housing two studios. Between 1978 and 1985, two more studios were added to the building. In 1985, a 10,000-square-foot addition was built, housing Studios E & F; Studio E was designed by George Augspurger (of Perception Inc. in Los Angeles, CA), the acoustical engineer who designed the main monitor speakers in Studios A & E and also redesigned several other rooms at Doppler. The seventh room, Studio G (also designed by Augspurger), was added in 1995.

In 1996, Bill Quinn and Joe Neil purchased Doppler from Caldwell and Wells. Neil, who already operated his remote recording company Sam's Tape Truck, started as an audio engineer at Doppler. He built a second room in the original building before leaving Doppler in the late 1970s to work at Mastersound Studios, returning to Doppler in 1983 and eventually becoming Doppler's chief engineer. Quinn came to Doppler in 1973 at Neil's suggestion, and worked as an engineer until becoming studio manager in 1988. Artists recording at the facility ranged from Stevie Wonder and Kanye West to Pearl Jam and Jimmy Carter. The original Doppler Studios closed in June, 2016.

== Notable recording sessions at Doppler ==
- Adult Swim series Aqua Teen Hunger Force
- FX series Archer
- Cartoon Network series Class of 3000
- Adult Swim series Frisky Dingo
- Adult Swim series Sealab 2021
- Cartoon Network series Space Ghost Coast to Coast
- Adult Swim series Squidbillies
- Tony Rich's Words album was recorded here.
- TLC's single "Waterfalls" was recorded in part at Doppler Studios.
- Outkast's second album ATLiens was recorded in part at Doppler Studios.
- Kanye West's single "Can't Tell Me Nothing" was recorded in part at Doppler Studios.
