= CeeLo Green discography =

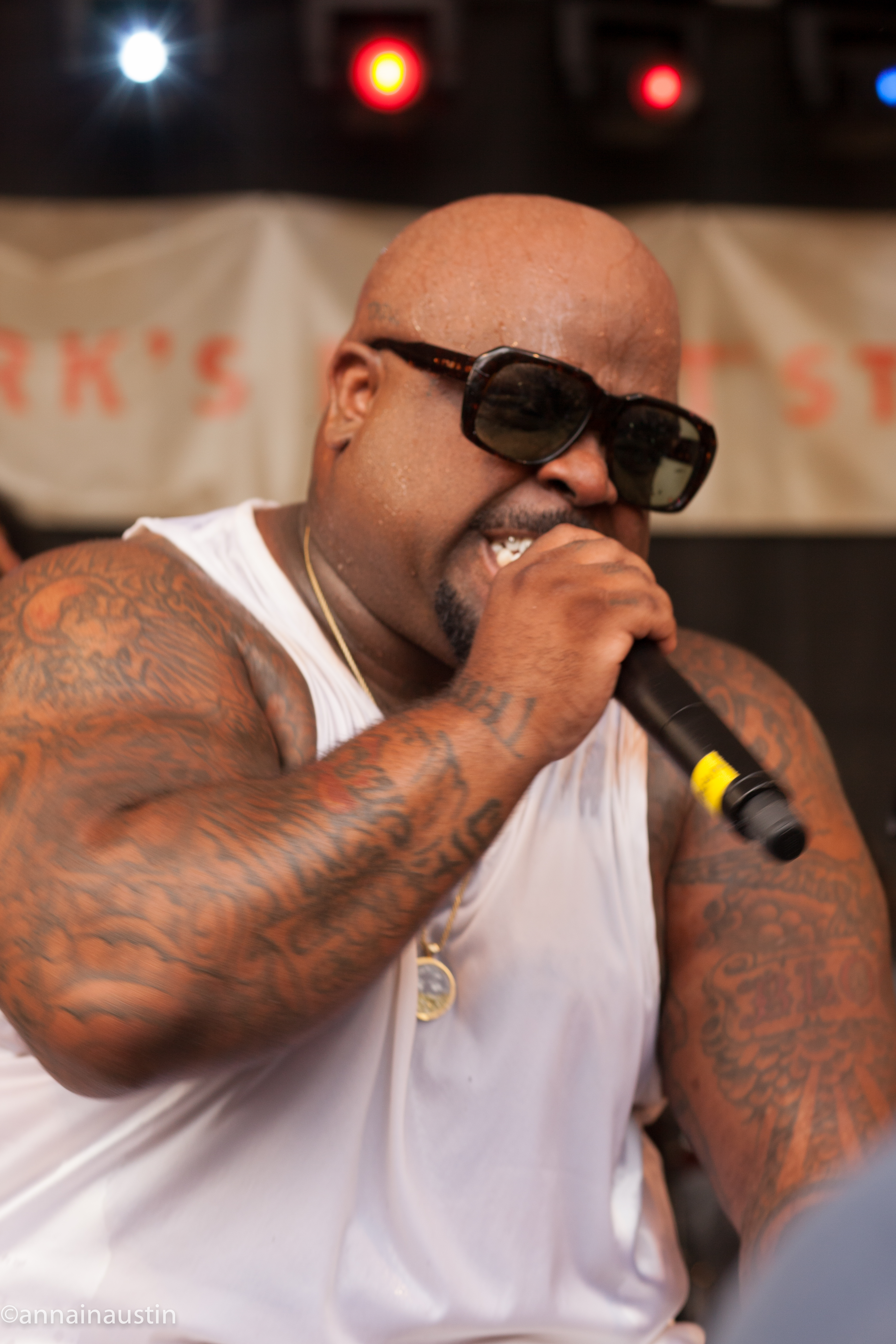
- Green performing in 2014
- Studio albums: 6
- Compilation albums: 1
- Singles: 39
- Music videos: 25

The American rapper CeeLo Green has released six studio albums, one compilation album, thirty-nine singles and twenty-five music videos. Diversified in the genres of hip hop, alternative, and soul music, he began his career as a part of the Atlanta-based hip hop group Goodie Mob, which itself was a part of the collective Dungeon Family. His solo career was embarked upon in 2002 with the album Cee-Lo Green and His Perfect Imperfections. The album and its follow ups would feature a retro-infused funk panache executed with soulful delivery. This would be most exemplified in his third solo effort: The Lady Killer (2010).

== Albums ==
=== Studio albums ===
List of studio albums, with selected chart positions, sales figures and certifications
Title	Album details	Peak chart positions										Sales	Certifications
Title	Album details	US	US R&B	AUS	AUT	BEL (FL)	DEN	IRL	NLD	NZ	UK	Sales	Certifications
Cee-Lo Green and His Perfect Imperfections	Released: April 23, 2002 (US); Label: Arista; Formats: CD, LP, digital download	11	2	—	—	—	—	—	—	—	—	US: 250,000	
Cee-Lo Green... Is the Soul Machine	Released: March 2, 2004 (US); Label: Arista; Formats: CD, LP, digital download	13	2	—	—	—	—	—	—	—	—	US: 229,000; UK: 1,532	
The Lady Killer	Released: November 9, 2010 (US); Label: Elektra, Asylum; Formats: CD, LP, digital download	9	2	24	63	51	38	18	34	38	3	US: 498,000; UK: 756,000	BPI: 2× Platinum; IRMA: Platinum
Cee Lo's Magic Moment	Released: October 30, 2012 (US); Label: Elektra, Warner Bros.; Formats: CD, LP, digital download	25	4	—	—	—	—	—	—	—	167	US: 225,000	
Heart Blanche	Released: November 6, 2015; Label: Atlantic; Formats: CD, LP, digital download	—	26	—	—	—	—	—	—	—	43		
CeeLo Green Is Thomas Callaway	Released: June 26, 2020; Label: Easy Eye Sound; Formats: CD, LP, digital download	—	—	—	—	—	—	—	—	—	—		
"—" denotes releases that did not chart or were not released in that territory.

=== Compilation albums ===
List of compilation albums
Title	Album details
Closet Freak: The Best of Cee-Lo Green the Soul Machine	Released: October 31, 2006 (US); Label: Arista; Formats: CD, LP, digital download

== Singles ==
=== As lead artist ===
List of singles as lead artist, with selected chart positions and certifications, showing year released and album name
Title	Year	Peak chart positions										Certifications	Album
Title	Year	US	US R&B/HH	AUS	AUT	BEL (FL)	DEN	IRL	NLD	NZ	UK	Certifications	Album
"Closet Freak"	2002	98	56	—	—	—	—	—	—	—	—		Cee-Lo Green and His Perfect Imperfections
"Gettin' Grown"	2002	—	—	—	—	—	—	—	—	—	—		Cee-Lo Green and His Perfect Imperfections
"I'll Be Around" (featuring Timbaland)	2004	—	52	—	—	—	—	—	—	—	—		Cee-Lo Green... Is the Soul Machine
"The One"	2004	—	82	—	—	—	—	—	—	—	—		Cee-Lo Green... Is the Soul Machine
"Happy Hour" (with Jazze Pha)	2005	—	—	—	—	—	—	—	—	—	—		Non-album single
"Kung Fu Fighting" (with Jack Black)	2008	—	—	77	—	—	—	—	—	—	—	RMNZ: Gold	Kung Fu Panda (soundtrack)
"Stranger in the Crowd"	2009	—	—	—	—	—	—	—	—	—	—		Non-album singles
"Open Happiness" (with Patrick Stump, Brendon Urie, Travie McCoy and Janelle Monáe)	2009	—	—	—	11	—	—	—	—	29	—	RMNZ: Gold	Non-album singles
"What Part of Forever"	2010	—	—	—	—	—	—	—	—	—	—		The Twilight Saga: Eclipse (soundtrack)
"Georgia"	2010	—	—	—	—	—	—	—	—	—	—		The Lady Killer
"No One's Gonna Love You"	2010	—	― (Note: "No One's Gonna Love You" did not enter the Hot R&B/Hip-Hop Songs chart, but peaked at number six on the Hot R&B/Hip-Hop Singles Sales chart.)	—	—	—	—	—	—	—	—		The Lady Killer
"Pimps Don't Cry" (featuring Eva Mendes)	2010	—	—	—	—	—	—	—	—	—	—		The Other Guys (soundtrack)
"Fuck You"	2010	2	57	5	5	12	2	6	3	5	1	RIAA: 7× Platinum; ARIA: 3× Platinum; BPI: 3P latinum; MC: 4× Platinum; RMNZ: 4× Platinum	The Lady Killer
"It's OK"	2010	—	—	—	—	54	—	31	94	—	20		The Lady Killer
"Fool for You" (featuring Philip Bailey or Melanie Fiona)	2011	— (Note: "Fool for You" did not enter the Billboard Hot 100, but peaked at number one on the Bubbling Under Hot 100 chart, which acts as an extension to the Hot 100.)	13	—	—	—	—	—	—	—	—		The Lady Killer
"Bright Lights Bigger City"	2011	— (Note: "Bright Lights Bigger City" did not enter the Billboard Hot 100, but peaked at number two on the Bubbling Under Hot 100 chart, which acts as an extension to the Hot 100.)	—	—	21	33	—	36	23	9	13	RMNZ: Platinum; BPI: Silver	The Lady Killer
"I Want You (Hold On to Love)"	2011	—	—	—	—	—	—	—	82	—	90	RMNZ: Gold	The Lady Killer
"Love Is a Battlefield" (featuring Vicci Martinez)	2011	— (Note: "Love Is a Battlefield" did not enter the Billboard Hot 100, but peaked at number two on the Bubbling Under Hot 100 chart, which acts as an extension to the Hot 100.)	—	—	—	—	—	—	—	—	—		Non-album single
"Cry Baby"	2011	—	—	—	—	—	—	—	—	—	58		The Lady Killer
"Anyway"	2011	—	—	—	—	—	—	—	—	—	52		The Lady Killer
"Born to Be Wild" (with Juliet Simms)	2012	—	—	—	—	—	—	—	—	—	—		Non-album singles
"Blitzkrieg Bop (I Love Football)"	2012	—	—	—	—	—	—	—	—	—	—		Non-album singles
"Only You" (featuring Lauriana Mae)	2013	—	—	—	—	—	—	—	—	—	—		Non-album singles
"Working Class Heroes (Work)"	2015	—	—	—	—	—	—	—	—	—	—		Barbershop: The Next Cut (soundtrack)
"Robin Williams"	2015	—	—	—	—	—	—	—	—	—	—		Heart Blanche
"Sign of the Times"	2015	—	—	—	—	—	—	—	—	—	—		Heart Blanche
"Music to My Soul"	2015	—	—	—	—	—	—	—	—	—	59		Heart Blanche
"Lead Me"	2020	—	—	—	—	—	—	—	—	—	—		CeeLo Green Is Thomas Callaway
"—" denotes releases that did not chart or were not released in that territory.

=== As featured artist ===
List of singles as featured artist, with selected chart positions and certifications, showing year released and album name
Title	Year	Peak chart positions										Certifications	Album
Title	Year	US	US R&B/HH	US Rap	AUS	AUT	CAN	GER	IRE	NLD	UK	Certifications	Album
"In Due Time" (Outkast featuring Cee Lo Green)	1997												Soul Food (soundtrack)
"In da Wind" (Trick Daddy featuring Cee Lo Green and Big Boi)	2002	70	28	16	—	—	—	—	—	—	—		Thug Holiday
"Inspiration" (Da Ranjahz featuring Cee Lo Green)	2003	—	—	—	—	—	—	—	—	—	—		Who Feels It Knows
"All I Know" (Field Mob featuring Cee Lo Green and Jazze Pha)	2003	—	77	—	—	—	—	—	—	—	—		From tha Roota to tha Toota
"Sugar (Gimme Some)" (Trick Daddy featuring Ludacris, Lil' Kim and Cee Lo Green)	2005	20	36	12	31	—	—	—	—	—	61	RIAA: Gold	Thug Matrimony: Married to the Streets
"Aufstehn!" (Seeed featuring Cee Lo Green)	2005	—	—	—	—	14	—	5	—	—	—		Next!
"Politics" (Royce da 5'9" featuring Cee Lo Green)	2005	—	—	—	—	—	—	—	—	—	—		Independent's Day
"Lil Star" (Kelis featuring Cee Lo Green)	2007	—	—	—	—	—	—	99	8	95	3		Kelis Was Here
"Less Than an Hour" (Nas featuring Cee Lo Green)	2007	—	—	—	—	—	—	—	—	—	—		Rush Hour 3 (soundtrack)
"Pretty Please (Love Me)" (Estelle featuring Cee Lo Green)	2008	—	—	—	—	—	—	—	—	—	103		Shine
"Be by Myself" (Asher Roth featuring Cee Lo Green)	2009	— (Note: "Be by Myself" did not enter the Billboard Hot 100, but peaked at number seven on the Bubbling Under Hot 100 chart, which acts as an extension to the Hot 100.)	—	—	—	—	—	—	—	—	—		Asleep in the Bread Aisle
"Cho Cha" (Teddybears featuring Cee Lo Green and The B-52's)	2011	—	—	—	—	—	—	—	—	—	—		Devil's Music
"Electric Lady" (40 Glocc featuring Cee Lo Green)	2011	—	—	—	—	—	—	—	—	—	—		New World Agenda
"Letter to My Son" (Don Trip featuring Cee Lo Green)	2011	—	89	—	—	—	—	—	—	—	—		—N/a
"My Life" (Slaughterhouse featuring Cee Lo Green)	2012	— (Note: "My Life" did not enter the Billboard Hot 100, but peaked at number eight on the Bubbling Under Hot 100 chart, which acts as an extension to the Hot 100.)	—	—	—	—	87	—	—	—	—		Welcome to: Our House
"Come Along" (Vicci Martinez featuring Cee Lo Green)	2012	—	—	—	—	—	—	—	—	—	—		Come Along
"Hello" (T.I. featuring Cee Lo Green)	2013	—	—	—	—	—	—	—	—	—	—		Trouble Man: Heavy Is the Head
"Shine Like Gold" (Gipp featuring Cee Lo Green)	2014	—	—	—	—	—	—	—	—	—	—		Zagga
"Legendary" (Tyrese featuring Cee Lo Green)	2020	—	—	—	—	—	—	—	—	—	—		—N/a
"The King and I" (Eminem featuring CeeLo Green)	2022	—	—	—	—	—	—	—	97	—	86		Elvis (soundtrack) / Curtain Call 2
"—" denotes releases that did not chart or were not released in that territory.

== Other charted songs ==
List of songs, with selected chart positions, showing year released and album name
Title	Year	Peak chart positions					Album
Title	Year	US	US AC	US R&B/HH	CAN	UK	Album
"In Due Time" (Outkast featuring Cee Lo Green)	1997	—	—	— (Note: "In Due Time" did not enter the Hot R&B/Hip-Hop Songs chart, but peaked at number 75 on the Hot R&B/Hip-Hop Airplay chart.)	—	—	Soul Food soundtrack
"Everything I Love" (Diddy featuring Nas and Cee Lo Green)	2006	—	—	— (Note: "Everything I Love" did not enter the Hot R&B/Hip-Hop Songs chart, but peaked at number 19 on the Bubbling Under R&B/Hip-Hop Singles chart, which acts as an extension to the R&B/Hip-Hop Songs chart.)	—	—	Press Play
"The Other Side" (Bruno Mars featuring Cee Lo Green and B.o.B)	2010	—	—	—	—	97	It's Better If You Don't Understand
"Scott Mescudi vs. the World" (Kid Cudi featuring Cee Lo Green)	2010	92	—	—	88	—	Man on the Moon II: The Legend of Mr. Rager
"Mary, Did You Know?"	2012	— (Note: "Mary, Did You Know?" did not enter the Billboard Hot 100, but peaked at number seven on the Bubbling Under Hot 100 Singles chart, which acts as an extension to the Hot 100.)	—	35	—	—	Cee Lo's Magic Moment
"What Christmas Means to Me"	2012	— (Note: "What Christmas Means to Me" did not enter the Billboard Hot 100, but peaked at number 15 on the Bubbling Under Hot 100 chart, which acts as an extension to the Hot 100.)	—	37	89	—	Cee Lo's Magic Moment
"Baby, It's Cold Outside" (featuring Christina Aguilera)	2012	—	—	—	92	—	Cee Lo's Magic Moment
"All I Need Is Love" (featuring The Muppets)	2012	—	29	—	—	—	Cee Lo's Magic Moment
"Merry Christmas, Baby" (featuring Rod Stewart and Trombone Shorty)	2012	—	18	—	—	111	Cee Lo's Magic Moment and Merry Christmas, Baby
"Bully" (Kanye West featuring Cee Lo Green)	2026	61	—	19	61	— (Note: "Bully" did not enter the UK Singles chart, but peaked at number 41 on the UK Independent Singles Chart.)	Bully
"—" denotes a recording that did not chart or was not released in that territory.

== Guest appearances ==
List of non-single guest appearances, with other performing artists, showing year released and album name
Title	Year	Other artist(s)	Album
"Right Tonight"	1995	Society of Soul	Brainchild
"Organized Bass"	1997	Kilo Ali	Organized Bass
"G.O.D. (Gaining One's Definition)"	1997	Common	One Day It'll All Make Sense
"7th Floor/The Serengetti"	1998	Witchdoctor	A S.W.A.T. Healin' Ritual
"Curse on You"	1998	Sleepy's Theme	The Vinyl Room
"Liberation"	1998	Outkast, Erykah Badu, Big Rube	Aquemini
"Paid Dues"	1999	8Ball & MJG	In Our Lifetime, Vol. 1
"Do You Like the Way"	1999	Santana, Lauryn Hill	Supernatural
"Do Something" (Organized Noize Mix)	1999	Macy Gray	"Do Something" single
"You Know"	1999	Heavy D	Heavy
"Reverse"	1999	Puff Daddy, Shyne, G. Dep, Redman, Busta Rhymes, Sauce Money	Forever
"Something Good"	1999	1 Life 2 Live, Khujo of Goodie Mob	1 Life 2 Live
"Lookin' at Us"	2000	Black Rob	Life Story
"A Song for Assata"	2000	Common	Like Water for Chocolate
"Sex, Money, Drugs"	2000	Easy Mo Bee	Now or Never: Odyssey 2000
"Lil' Drummer Boy"	2000	Lil' Kim, Redman	The Notorious K.I.M.
"My Time 2 Go"	2000	P.A.	My Life, Your Entertainment
"We're All Gonna Die"	2000	Everlast	Eat at Whitey's
"Storm Chaser"	2000	Rehab, Big Gipp	Southern Discomfort
"Slum Beautiful"	2000	Outkast	Stankonia
"C.O.S.P.L.E."	2000	Frank Real	Frank Real
"Rap Star Status"	2001	Big G., DJ Wil, Walla	I'm Bigger Than You
"Speedballin'"	2001	Outkast	Lara Croft: Tomb Raider (soundtrack)
"Lord Have Mercy"	2001	Backbone, Joi	Concrete Law
"Sexual Chocolate"	2001	—N/a	Violator: The Album, V2.0
"Stop Lyin'"	2001	Po' White Trash	Po' Like Dis
"Held Down"	2001	De La Soul	AOI: Bionix
"Between Me, You and Liberation"	2002	Common	Electric Circus
"Heaven Somewhere"	2002	Common, Omar Lye-Fook, Bilal, Jill Scott, Mary J. Blige, Erykah Badu, Lonnie Lynn	Electric Circus
"Playerz"	2002	Ying Yang Twins, Kurtis Blow	Legends of Hip Hop
"Suzie Q"	2002	Skillz, Jazze Pha	I Ain't Mad No More
"Chuch"	2003	Da Brat	Limelite, Luv & Niteclubz
"What U Sittin' On?" (DM's 26 Remix)	2003	Danger Mouse, Tha Liks	Ghetto Pop Life
"Reset"	2003	Outkast, Khujo Goodie	Speakerboxxx/The Love Below
"U.N.I.T.Y."	2003	Rahzel	Rahzel's Greatest Knock Outs
"momentinlife"	2003	Musiq, Kindred the Family Soul	Soulstar
"Hope"	2004	Twista	Kamikaze
"Foxey Lady"	2004	—N/a	Power of Soul: A Tribute to Jimi Hendrix
"Beautiful Fool"	2004	—N/a	Soundz of Spirit
"Like That"	2005	The Black Eyed Peas, Q-Tip, Talib Kweli, John Legend	Monkey Business
"Gone"	2005	Esthero	Wikked Lil' Grrrls
"Walk This Way"	2005	P$C	25 to Life
"Bragging Rights"	2005	Bad Fathers	Angels in the Chamber
"(You Caught Me) Smilin'"	2005	Scar, Big Boi, DJ Swiff	Different Strokes by Different Folks
"Benzi Box"	2005	Danger Doom	The Mouse and the Mask
"What Is This?"	2005	Purple Ribbon All-Stars, Scar	Got Purp? Vol. 2
"Caved In"	2006	Cunninlynguists	A Piece of Strange
"Something Wrong"	2006	Cognito, B-Legit	Recognition
"Groupie Sex"	2006	Dave Ghetto	Lovelife
"Ophidiophobia"	2006	—N/a	Snakes on a Plane: The Album
"Groundhog Day"	2006	Mayday	Mayday!
"I'm the Work"	2006	Mr. Marcello	Son of Magnolia
"Everything I Love"	2006	Diddy, Nas	Press Play
"Say Say"	2007	Twista, Jazze Pha, Big Zak	Adrenaline Rush 2007
"I Told Ya"	2007	Ali & Gipp, Bun B	Kinfolk
"Falling"	2008	Paul Oakenfold	—N/a
"Make My Day"	2008	Common	Universal Mind Control
"Love Is a Murder"	2008	The Constellations	Southern Gothic
"Ghetto"	2009	Playaz Circle, Sunni Patterson	Flight 360: The Takeoff
"Middle"	2010	The Fixxers	Midnight Life
"The Other Side"	2010	Bruno Mars, B.o.B	It's Better If You Don't Understand
"Dr. Feel Good"	2010	Travie McCoy	Lazarus
"Tears of Joy"	2010	Rick Ross	Teflon Don
"Scott Mescudi vs. the World"	2010	Kid Cudi	Man on the Moon II: The Legend of Mr. Rager
"Brixton Briefcase"	2011	Chase & Status	No More Idols
"(You're So Square) Baby I Don't Care"	2011	—N/a	Rave on Buddy Holly
"Please"	2011	Selah Sue	Selah Sue
"Sleep When I'm Gone"	2011	DJ Khaled, Game, Busta Rhymes	We the Best Forever
"Never Die"	2012	DJ Drama, Jadakiss, Nipsey Hussle, Young Jeezy	Quality Street Music
"Make the World Move"	2012	Christina Aguilera	Lotus
"Merry Christmas, Baby"	2012	Rod Stewart, Trombone Shorty	Merry Christmas, Baby
"Workin' Man's Blues"	2013	Aceyalone	Leanin' on Slick
"Gullible"	2013	Wale	The Gifted
"That's My Kid"	2013	Tech N9ne, Big K.R.I.T., Kutt Calhoun	Something Else
"Problems'	2015	Ludacris	Ludaversal
"Footprints"	2015	A Tribe Called Quest	People's Instinctive Travels and the Paths of Rhythm (Reissue)
"Smile Mama, Smile"	2015	Rick Ross	Black Market
"You"	2015	Scarface	Deeply Rooted
"Untitled 06 | 06.30.2014"	2016	Kendrick Lamar	Untitled Unmastered
"Magnolia"	2016	David Banner	The God Box
"Violence (Army)"	2016	Chief Keef	—N/a
"We"	2016	Mac Miller	The Divine Feminine
"Marvin"	2017	Raekwon	The Wild
"The Night Begins to Shine"	2017	Fall Out Boy	Teen Titans Go!
"Get Up to Come Down"	2017	Big K.R.I.T., Sleepy Brown	4eva Is a Mighty Long Time
"Big Kids"	2017	B.o.B., Usher	Ether
"Gotta Love It"	2018	PRhyme, Brady Watt	PRhyme 2
"North Star"	2019	Offset	Father of 4
"Gone, Gone / Thank You"	2019	Tyler, the Creator, La Roux, Jessy Wilson, Anthony Evans, Amanda Brown, Tiffany Stevenson, Jerrod Carmichael	Igor
"Won't Take My Soul"	2019	DJ Khaled, Nas	Father of Asahd
"Already Rich"	2019	Jeezy	TM104
"Save My Soul (The CuDi Confession)" + "Is It Because I'm Black"	2021	Salaam Remi	Black on Purpose
"Blackskin Mile"	2021	—N/a	The Harder They Fall
"La Era de la Sazón"	2021	Cimafunk	El Alimento
"Intentions"	2021	Big Boi & Sleepy Brown	Big Sleepover
"How I Feel"	2022	F.A.B.I.D.	The LP
"Power"	2022	EarthGang	Ghetto Gods
"My Queen"	2022	Bun B & Cory Mo	Mo Trill
"Big Funds"	2022	LNDN DRGS	2 P’z In A Pod
"Pesos"	2022	Jimmie Allen	Tulip Drive
"Catfish Blackened w/ Grits"	2022	Tobe Nwigwe	moMINTs
"Son Light"	2023	Neek Bucks	Blessed To The Max
"Down by Law"	2023	Killer Mike	Michael
"Joker's Wild"	2023	DJ Muggs	Death Valley
"Bully"	2026	Kanye West	Bully

== Production discography ==
List of producer and songwriting credits (excluding guest appearances, interpolations, and samples)
Track(s)	Year	Credit	Artist(s)	Album
8. "Ghetto-ology"	1998	Producer	Goodie Mob	Still Standing
5. "The Dip"	1999	Producer	Goodie Mob	World Party
3. "Like This"	2001	Producer	Backbone	Concrete Law
All tracks	2002	Producer	CeeLo Green	Cee-Lo Green and His Perfect Imperfections
2. "Head to Toe"; (featuring Sleepy Brown)	2003	Songwriter	Roscoe	Young Roscoe Philaphornia
13. "I Call Shots, Pt II"	2003	Songwriter	Roscoe	Young Roscoe Philaphornia
10. "Necessary"	2004	Songwriter	Brandy Norwood	Afrodisiac
1. "Don't Cha"; (featuring Busta Rhymes)	2005	Producer, additional vocals	The Pussycat Dolls	PCD
5. "Take Control"	2006	Additional producer, songwriter	Amerie	Because I Love It
13. "Lil Star"; (featuring Cee-Lo)	2006	Producer	Kelis	Kelis Was Here
2. "T.O.N.Y."	2008	Songwriter	Solange Knowles	Sol-Angel and the Hadley St. Dreams
5. "Sandcastle Disco"	2008	Songwriter	Solange Knowles	Sol-Angel and the Hadley St. Dreams
14. "All Dressed In Love"	2008	Songwriter	Jennifer Hudson	Jennifer Hudson, Sex and the City: Original Motion Picture Soundtrack
1. "Lush Life"	2009	Producer	Nat King Cole	Re:Generations
1. "Nasty"	2014	Songwriter	Pixie Lott	Pixie Lott
10. "One Day"	2015	Producer	Zac Brown Band	Jekyll + Hyde
4. "Broken Heart"; (featuring Beenie Man)	2016	Songwriter	Teddybears	Rock On!
"Pick It Up" (featuring CeeLo Green)	2016	Producer (with Sean Phelan)	Swagu Style House	Non-album single
"Sex In The City"	2017	Producer	Ali Aura	Non-album single
"Loose Me"	2018	Producer (with Diimond Meeks)	Diimond Meeks	Non-album single
1. "Let Go"	2021	Songwriter	Tinashe	333

== Music videos ==
=== As lead artist ===
List of music videos as lead artist, showing year released and directors
Title	Year	Director(s)
"Closet Freak"	2002	Brian Belectic
"Gettin' Grown"	2002	Brian Belectic, Cee-Lo Green
"I'll Be Around" (featuring Timbaland)	2003	Lenny Bass
"Happy Hour" (with Jazze Pha)	2005	Fat Cats, Big Zak
"Open Happiness" (with Patrick Stump, Brendon Urie, Travie McCoy and Janelle Monáe)	2009	Alan Ferguson
"Fuck You"	2010	Matt Stawski
"What Part of Forever"	2010	Christopher Sims
"No One's Gonna Love You"	2010	Skinny
"It's OK"	2010	Matt Stawski
"Bright Lights Bigger City"	2011	Kai Regan
"Bright Lights Bigger City" (Remix) (featuring Wiz Khalifa)	2011	Kai Regan
"I Want You (Hold on to Love)"	2011	Mazik Self
"Cry Baby"	2011	Mickey Finnegan
"Anyway"	2011	Wonford St. James
"Only You" (featuring Lauriana Mae)	2013	Ethan Lader

=== As featured artist ===
List of music videos as featured artist, showing year released and directors
Title	Year	Director(s)
"In da Wind" (Trick Daddy featuring Cee Lo Green)	2002	Brian Barber
"All I Know" (Field Mob featuring Cee Lo Green)	2003	Lenny Bass
"Sugar (Gimme Some)" (Trick Daddy featuring Lil' Kim and Cee Lo Green)	2005	Ray Kay
"Aufstehn!" (Seeed featuring Cee Lo Green)	2005	Daniel Harder
"Like That" (The Black Eyed Peas featuring Q-Tip, Cee Lo Green, Talib Kweli and John Legend)	2005	Syndrome, Nabil Elderkin
"Groundhog Day" (Mayday featuring Cee Lo Green)	2006	Jokes
"Lil Star" (Kelis featuring Cee Lo Green)	2007	Marc Klasfeld
"Pretty Please (Love Me)" (Estelle featuring Cee Lo Green)	2008	Zipper on Butta Fly Leather
"Be by Myself" (Asher Roth featuring Cee Lo Green)	2009	John Christopher Pina
"My Life" (Slaughterhouse featuring Cee Lo Green)	2012	Syndrome

== See also ==
- Gnarls Barkley discography
- Goodie Mob discography
