= Bruce Greer =

American pianist, singer and composer (born 1961)

- Born: David Bruce Greer; October 2, 1961 (age 64)
- Origin: Longview, Texas, US
- Genres: Worship music, Musical theatre
- Occupations: musician, songwriter
- Instrument: piano
- Years active: 1980s–present
- Website: http://www.brucegreer.com

Bruce Greer (born October 2, 1961 in Longview, Texas) is an American pianist, singer and composer.

== Biographical information ==
Greer recalls arranging hymns for choir and piano by age twelve. By the time he was in high school, his compositions were being performed by his church and school choirs. During his senior year at Longview High School, his school choir used one of his pieces, "We Are Thy People," for University Interscholastic League competition. Another choral composition, "Prayer of Joy," which was also written for his high school choir, went on the following year to become his first published work.

This interest in musical composition lead Greer to Baylor University on full scholarship where he graduated with honors as the outstanding Senior Man in 1984 with a Bachelor of Music degree in Theory and Composition.

== Career ==
Upon graduation, Greer went to work as a Creative Director for Word Records, the world's largest producer of Christian music. He spent six years as a songwriter, arranger and producer for Word Music, recording several projects as a piano artist. Word's distribution brought widespread recognition and interest for Greer's piano artistry. In 1990, he left Word to pursue a full-time writing and concert career.

Greer and longtime friend Keith Ferguson wrote a musical stage adaptation of the classic 1946 film It's a Wonderful Life. The stage musical premiered at the Majestic Theatre (Dallas, Texas) on December 18, 1998, and was an annual Christmas show at the theater for five years. It has since been performed at various regional and community theaters across the United States.

In 1999, Greer and collaborator David Guthrie received a Dove Award for Musical of the Year for their musical Mary, Did You Know?, based on the song of the same name by Mark Lowry and Buddy Greene.

That same year, Greer was named a distinguished alumnus of Longview High School.

Greer teamed up with Ferguson again to write a musical stage adaptation of Charles Dickens's classic 1843 novella A Christmas Carol. This musical premiered at The First Baptist Church in Carrollton, Texas, in December 2010.

Greer and Ferguson's newest musical, entitled Hidden and based on the Book of Esther, went into development with Dallas Summer Musicals.

Since leaving Word in 1990, Greer has become one of the most popular and highly regarded writers for church music in the country with hundreds of titles and projects published by a wide array of leading publishers. He has done extensive concert and recording work as a solo artist and also with vocalist Cynthia Clawson. He has taken his music around the world, playing the piano and singing in Singapore, Malaysia, England, Canada as well as all over the United States.

== Current life and family ==
Greer currently lives in the Dallas-Forth Worth area, where he serves as Chief Accompanist at First Baptist Church Dallas. Bruce and his wife Kim have four married sons and 11 grandchildren.
