= Mary, Did You Know? =

Christmas song by Mark Lowry and Buddy Greene

"Mary, Did You Know?" is a Christmas song addressing Mary, mother of Jesus, with lyrics written by Mark Lowry in 1984, and music written by Buddy Greene in 1991. It was originally recorded by Christian recording artist Michael English on his self-titled debut solo album in 1991. At the time, English and Lowry were members of the Gaither Vocal Band, and Greene was touring with them. The song reached number six on the CCM Magazine Adult Contemporary Chart. In 1993, the second singer (and first secular artist) to record the song was country singer Kathy Mattea on her album Good News, which won the Grammy Award for Best Southern, Country or Bluegrass Gospel Album. Lowry would record the song several times himself, most notably with the Gaither Vocal Band on their 1998 Christmas album, Still the Greatest Story Ever Told.

The song has since been recorded by hundreds of artists across multiple genres. Several recordings have reached the top 10 in various Billboard charts. The song encourages contemplation of the relationship between Mary and her son, and the lyrics have been both praised and criticized by religious commentators.

== Music and lyrics ==
"Mary, Did You Know?" was originally released in the key of E♭ minor, with a tempo of 53 beats per minute in 4/4 meter, based around a chord progression of E♭m–D♭–A♭m7–B♭7sus4–B♭7. The lyrics evolved from a series of questions that Lowry scripted for a Christmas program at his church:

I just tried to put into words the unfathomable. I started thinking of the questions I would have for her if I were to sit down and have coffee with Mary. You know, "What was it like raising God?" "What did you know?" "What didn't you know?"

None of the questions are answered in the song. Instead, the lyrics poetically invite the listener to contemplate the relationship between Mary and her newborn divine son, even if her faith and awareness did not yet include the details of what would unfold.

The text has received both praise for reflecting the love of God, as well as criticism for perceived ambiguity or lack of theological depth. Robert McTeigue and Michelle Arnold, both Roman Catholic commentators, have questioned a particular line of text ("This Child that you delivered will soon deliver you") that might confuse or challenge the belief that Mary herself was conceived without sin. On the other hand, Roman Catholic author Karl Erickson implored people to appreciate "Mary, Did You Know?" as "an imperfect, yet beautiful, expression of God's love for all of us" and responded to criticism of the piece, stating:

"Mary, Did You Know" is a song and not a theological essay. Even as simple Christmas music, however, it does a fine job conveying the beauty and profound mystery of the Incarnation. Yes, there is some poetic license taken within the lyrics, but much less than is taken within innumerable other songs we are asked to sing regularly—"Sing a New Church", for example.

Lutheran clergyman Timothy Koch states that criticism of the song is unwarranted because "Mary, Did You Know?" is simply poetry using rhetorical questions and that it is "actually communicating to the singer and hearer the truths about Jesus", including doctrines of salvation, homoousious, and the theotokos.

In 2017, Toronto-based theologian Jennifer Henry wrote new lyrics that address the criticisms and echo Mary's words from the biblical Magnificat. These new lyrics have begun to spread in religious settings.

== Stage musical ==
The song was used as the basis for a stage musical, written by David Guthrie and Bruce Greer and also titled Mary, Did You Know?, which won the 1999 Gospel Music Association Dove Award for Musical of the Year.

== Charted cover recordings ==
=== Kenny Rogers and Wynonna Judd (1996) ===
"Mary, Did You Know?"

Single by Kenny Rogers and Wynonna Judd

from the album The Gift
- Released: December 1996
- Genre: Country
- Length: 3:53
- Label: Magnatone
- Songwriters: Mark Lowry, Buddy Greene
- Producers: Brent Maher, Jim McKell

Kenny Rogers singles chronology
"I'll Be There for You" (1992)	"Mary, Did You Know?" (1996)	"The Greatest" (1999)

Music video
- "Mary, Did You Know?" on YouTube

A duet, recorded by Wynonna Judd and Kenny Rogers on Rogers' holiday album The Gift, peaked at number 55 on the Billboard Hot Country Singles and Tracks chart in 1997.

Chart positions

Chart (1997)	Peak position
US Hot Country Songs (Billboard)	55

=== Clay Aiken (2004) ===
"Mary, Did You Know?"

Single by Clay Aiken

from the album Merry Christmas with Love
- Released: 2005
- Recorded: 2004
- Genre: Contemporary Christian music, Latin Pop
- Length: 3:21
- Label: RCA
- Songwriters: Mark Lowry, Buddy Greene
- Producer: Walter Afanasieff

Clay Aiken singles chronology
"Have Yourself a Merry Little Christmas" (2005)	"Mary, Did You Know?" (2005)	"Without You" (2006)

"Mary, Did You Know?" is the fifth single from Clay Aiken's 2004 Christmas album Merry Christmas with Love. Aiken performed the song on The Tyra Banks Show.

Chart positions

Chart (2005)	Peak position
U.S. Billboard Hot Adult Contemporary Tracks	35
U.S. Billboard Hot Christian Songs	32

=== CeeLo Green (2012) ===
"Mary, Did You Know?"

Single by CeeLo Green

from the album Cee Lo's Magic Moment
- Released: 2012
- Recorded: 2012
- Genre: R&B
- Length: 3:54
- Label: RCA
- Songwriters: Mark Lowry, Buddy Greene
- Producers: Adam Anders, Peer Åström

Visualizer video
- "Mary, Did You Know?" on YouTube

"Mary, Did You Know?" is the 11th track on CeeLo Green's Christmas album Cee Lo's Magic Moment. On December 15, 2012, the song appeared on the US R&B Songs chart at number 22 and peaked three weeks later at number 9. This version is the slowest of all. A remixed version also served as the closing credits song to the 2014 20th Century Fox movie Son of God.

Chart positions

Chart (2013)	Peak position
U.S. Billboard Hot R&B Songs	9
U.S. Billboard Hot R&B/Hip-Hop Songs	35

=== Pentatonix (2014) ===
"Mary, Did You Know?"

Single by Pentatonix

from the album That's Christmas to Me
- Released: October 17, 2014
- Recorded: 2012
- Genre: Ambient, a cappella
- Length: 3:23
- Label: RCA
- Songwriters: Mark Lowry, Buddy Greene

Music video
- "Mary, Did You Know?" on YouTube

"Mary, Did You Know?" is the sixth track on Pentatonix's second Christmas album, That's Christmas to Me. The song both debuted and peaked at number 26 on the weekly Billboard Hot 100 chart for the week ending December 6, 2014.

Chart positions

Chart (2014–2026)	Peak position
Austria (Ö3 Austria Top 40)	47
Canada Hot 100 (Billboard)	44
Global 200 (Billboard)	136
Hungary (Single Top 40)	39
US Billboard Hot 100	26
US Adult Contemporary (Billboard)	20
US Christian Airplay (Billboard)	23
US Holiday 100 (Billboard)	1

Certifications

Region	Certification	Certified units/sales
New Zealand (RMNZ)	Gold	15,000^{‡}
^{‡} Sales+streaming figures based on certification alone.

=== Jordan Smith (2015) ===
In 2015, Jordan Smith performed the song on the season nine finals of The Voice (U.S.). This version debuted and peaked at number 24 on Billboard's Hot 100 chart and at number 2 on its Holiday 100 chart.

=== Zara Larsson (2017) ===
"Mary, Did You Know?"

Song by Zara Larsson

from the album The Star (Original Motion Picture Soundtrack)
- Released: October 27, 2017
- Genre: Christmas
- Length: 3:23
- Label: Epic Records
- Songwriters: Mark Lowry; Buddy Greene
- Producer: Ron Fair

Audio video
- "Mary, Did You Know?" on YouTube

In 2017, Zara Larsson's cover of the song was included in the soundtrack to the film The Star, released on October 27, 2017. The cover went on to peak at number 55 on the Swedish charts during the 2018 holiday period, making another appearance for one week in 2019 at number 87.

=== Carrie Underwood (2020) ===
In 2020, Carrie Underwood included the song as the eighth track on her debut Christmas album, My Gift. Underwood's version charted on Billboard's Hot Christian Songs, peaking at number 31. Underwood performed the song on The Kelly Clarkson Show.

=== Dolly Parton (2020) ===
"Mary, Did You Know?"

Single by Dolly Parton

from the album A Holly Dolly Christmas
- Released: August 21, 2020
- Genre: Christmas
- Length: 4:26
- Label: Butterfly; 12-Tone Music Group
- Songwriters: Mark Lowry; Buddy Greene
- Producer: Kent Wells

Dolly Parton singles chronology
"When Life Is Good Again" (2020)	"Mary, Did You Know?" (2020)	"I Saw Mommy Kissing Santa Claus" (2020)

Music video
- "Mary, Did You Know?" on YouTube

In 2020, Dolly Parton covered the song on her album A Holly Dolly Christmas. It was released as the first single from the album on August 21, 2020. Parton performed the song for the first time during a livestream event on Amazon Music on November 13, 2020. She also performed the song during NBC's annual Christmas in Rockefeller Center tree-lighting ceremony on December 2 and again during her CBS special A Holly Dolly Christmas on December 6. Parton's version of the song peaked at number 49 on the Billboard Hot Christian Songs chart and number 18 on the Billboard Christian Digital Song Sales chart.

Chart positions

Chart (2020)	Peak position
US Hot Christian Songs (Billboard)	49

=== Maverick City Music (2022) ===
"Mary Did You Know?"

Single by Maverick City Music featuring Chandler Moore, Lizzie Morgan and Mav City Gospel Choir

from the album A Very Maverick Christmas
- Released: November 25, 2022
- Genre: Worship
- Length: 2:54
- Label: Tribl
- Songwriters: Mark Lowry; Buddy Greene
- Producers: Tony Brown; Jonathan Jay; Brandon Lake

Maverick City Music singles chronology
"Fear Is Not My Future" (2022)	"Mary Did You Know?" (2022)

Chandler Moore singles chronology
"Fear Is Not My Future" (2022)	"Mary Did You Know?" (2022)

Lizzie Morgan singles chronology
"Leaning" (2022)	"Mary Did You Know?" (2022)

Music video
- "Mary Did You Know?" on YouTube

Maverick City Music's version of "Mary Did You Know?" impacted Christian radio in the United States on November 25, 2022, becoming the first single from the album. Maverick City Music released the radio version of "Mary Did You Know?" On December 2, 2022.

Chart performance for "Mary Did You Know?"
Chart (2022)	Peak position
US Hot Christian Songs (Billboard)	19
US Christian Airplay (Billboard)	15
US Christian AC (Billboard)	8
US Gospel Songs (Billboard)	7
