= CeeLo Green's The Good Life =

- Genre: Comedy
- Created by: CeeLo Green
- Presented by: CeeLo Green
- Country of origin: United States
- Original language: English
- No. of seasons: 1
- No. of episodes: 6

Production
- Executive producers: CeeLo Green; Andrew Jameson; Lawrence Mestel; Eli Frankel
- Running time: 30 minutes
- Production companies: Emerald TV Productions; Rogue Atlas Productions

Original release
- Network: TBS
- Release: June 23 – July 28, 2014

CeeLo Green's The Good Life is an American comedy series created and hosted by CeeLo Green. It premiered on TBS on June 23, 2014. It was cancelled by TBS on September 2, 2014.

== Plot ==
The series follows CeeLo Green and life in the city of Atlanta with his friends, fellow members of the Goodie Mob, doing wild and crazy things.

== Episodes ==
No.	Title	Original release date	Prod. code
1	"I Love You, You're Hired"	June 23, 2014	101
CeeLo and the Goodie Mob launch a sexy chauffeur service.
2	"Welcome to the A"	June 30, 2014	102
3	"Jungle Players"	July 7, 2014	103
4	"85% Chance You're Gonna Be Bad"	July 14, 2014	104
5	"It's All Wood"	July 21, 2014	105
6	"You Can't Fight Fire"	July 28, 2014	106

== Cancellation ==
On September 2, 2014, TBS confirmed that the show was cancelled following tweets by Green in which he expressed controversial views about what constitutes rape, though TBS claims the decision was over low ratings.
