= Lauriana Mae =

American singer-songwriter (born 1983)

- Born: January 18, 1983 (age 43); Red Bank, New Jersey
- Genres: R&B; soul; hip hop
- Occupations: Singer; songwriter
- Instrument: Vocals
- Years active: 2003–present
- Label: Atlantic Records(2011-2016)
- Website: laurianamae.store

Lauriana Mae (born January 18, 1983) is an American pop, R&B, and soul singer-songwriter. She has collaborated with musicians such as CeeLo Green, Kwamé, and B.o.B. In 2013, she performed guest vocals on "Only You" with Green which also led to a performance on The Ellen DeGeneres Show on April 17, 2013.

Mae’s upcoming project will release on her Team Pains Music Group label in partnership with Empire and is called “Small Town City Dreams”. The project retraces some of Mae’s experiences.

== Early life ==
Mae was born in Red Bank, New Jersey. She was influenced by Etta James, Billie Holiday, and Ella Fitzgerald. Mae began singing at home inspired by her mother, who spotted her talent at an early age. Mae joined a church choir; that gave her the confidence to audition for a performing arts high school, where she was accepted. She majored in vocal music. Mae began performing at local talent shows, auditioning for various gigs, and working with different groups. She was later part of the show Popstars group Scene 23.

== 2010s ==
Lauriana grew up in a landscape of diverse people, blue-collar ideals, and joyous backyard gatherings with dynamic music Just an hour away from New York City. She began working in NYC in her adolescence, and eventually signed to Atlantic Records in 2011. Mae released her debut EP, Love Mae, shortly after.

In 2015, Mae had an extended play album called City of Diamonds. This album had hip hop and R&B music on it. In 2016, Mae collaborated with singer-songwriter and rapper Dreezy for Mae's R&B song "LOL". In late 2016 or early 2017, Mae released a full album called Can't Go Back featuring Dreezy and Wu-Tang Clan rapper Raekwon.

== Discography ==
=== Albums ===
- Small Town City Dreams (2019)

=== Mixtapes ===
- Can't Go Back (2017)

=== EP’s ===
- Love Mae (EP) (2011)
- City of Diamonds (EP) (2015)
- Can't Go Back (EP) (Lauriana Mae & Jack Splash) (2017)

=== Singles ===
- Like A Drum (Beat It) (2011)
- Money Mae (2011)
- NYPD Blues (2015)
- Protect Your Neck (2015)
- LOL (feat. Dreezy) (2017)
- Love To The CIty (2019)
