= Closet Freak: The Best of Cee-Lo Green the Soul Machine =

2021 compilation al

Closet Freak: The Best of Cee-Lo Green, The Soul Machine

Compilation album by CeeLo Green
- Released: 2006
- Recorded: 1995–2004
- Genre: Rap, soul, alternative, vocal
- Length: 65:02
- Label: Arista
- Producer: Brian Burton

CeeLo Green chronology
Cee Lo Green... Is the Soul Machine (2004)	Closet Freak: The Best of Cee-Lo Green, The Soul Machine (2006)	The Lady Killer (2010)

Closet Freak: The Best of Cee Lo Green, The Soul Machine is a greatest hits compilation album released by American hip hop musician CeeLo Green, also known for working with Atlanta hip hop group Goodie Mob and production duo Gnarls Barkley. The album consists of tracks from his work with the Goodie Mob and his two solo albums. The album comes on the heels of his noted mainstream rise due to the popularity of the Gnarls Barkley St. Elsewhere album and "Crazy" single. Collaborators on the album include Timbaland, Pharrell, Ludacris, Jazze Pha, T.I., and Goodie Mob members Big Gipp, T-Mo, & Khujo. The compilation was released on October 31, 2006. AllMusic.com gave the album four stars out of five, describing it as "A great whirlwind run through Cee-Lo's career, right from the start of the adventure to more well known material, including collaborations with Timbaland and Ludacris."

== Track listing ==
No.	Title	Length
1.	"Free" (Goodie Mob)	1:24
2.	"Closet Freak" (CeeLo Green)	3:37
3.	"I'll Be Around" (CeeLo Featuring Timbaland)	3:42
4.	"The Art Of Noise" (CeeLo Featuring Pharrell)	3:45
5.	"Young Man (Sierra's Song)" (CeeLo Green)	3:58
6.	"Gettin' Grown" (CeeLo Green)	4:11
7.	"Evening News" (CeeLo Featuring Chazzie & Sir Cognac the Conversation)	4:10
8.	"I Am Selling Soul" (CeeLo Green)	4:18
9.	"Living Again" (CeeLo Green)	3:31
10.	"Medley: A Thug's Concern/One For the Road" (CeeLo Green)	5:43
11.	"Bass Head Jazz" (CeeLo Green)	3:33
12.	"Childz Play" (Cee-Lo feat. Ludacris)	3:51
13.	"Sometimes" (CeeLo Green)	5:03
14.	"Under Tha Influence (Follow Me)" (CeeLo Green)	4:55
15.	"The One" (CeeLo Featuring Jazze Pha & T.I.)	4:41
16.	"Soul Food" (Goodie Mob)	3:56
17.	"Cell Therapy" (Goodie Mob)	4:37
