= Lawrence Mestel =

American music executive and businessman (born 1962)

- Born: April 2, 1962 (age 64)
- Education: University of Massachusetts Amherst (BS)
- Occupation: Music executive
- Employer: Primary Wave Music
- Spouse: Amy Mestel (m. 1995)
- Children: 3

Lawrence Mestel (born April 2, 1962) is an American music executive and businessman. He is the founder and CEO of Primary Wave.

== Early life and education ==
Mestel was born in Brooklyn, New York to Zelig and Rita (née Miller) Mestel.

Mestel grew up in Marlboro Township, New Jersey and graduated from Marlboro High School in 1980, where he played basketball and tennis. He studied business at University of Massachusetts Amherst, graduating cum laude in 1984 on the Dean's List. He was accepted into the MBA program at NYU Stern School of Business, but declined after receiving a job offer from Chris Blackwell to join Island Records.

== Career ==
=== Early career ===
Mestel was appointed chief operating officer for Island Entertainment Group in 2000, which included Island Records, Island Music Publishing and Island Pictures. From 2000 – 2004, Mestel was executive vice president and general manager at Arista Records. Mestel was responsible for the label's sales, marketing, A&R administration, finance, and business affairs.

Mestel was chief operating officer and general manager of Virgin Records from 2004 – 2005, where he oversaw marketing, sales and business development.

=== Primary Wave ===
In January 2006, Mestel started a private, independent music publishing company, Primary Wave, after raising $50 million and acquiring 25% off Kurt Cobain’s portion of the Nirvana (band) song catalog from Courtney Love. As music IP owners, in their early years Primary Wave used lyrics and artists' name and likenesses to form brand deals with companies like Converse, the Massachusetts Lottery, and Funny or Die. As of 2020, the company controls and manages approximately $1.5 billion of cash and assets.

== Credits ==
Year	Title	Notes
2013	CeeLo Green is Loberace (TV Special)	Executive Producer
2013	Grace Unplugged (Film)	Executive Producer
2014	CeeLo Green's The Good Life (TV Series)	Executive Producer
2015	Kurt Cobain: Montage of Heck (Documentary)	Executive Producer
2015	Say It in Song (TV Series)	Co-Executive Producer; 2 Episodes
2022	I Wanna Dance With Somebody (Film)	Producer; Pre-production
