= Cee Lo's Magic Moment =

Studio album by Cee Lo Green
- Released: October 29, 2012
- Recorded: 2011–12
- Genres: Christmas; R&B
- Length: 51:55
- Labels: Elektra; Warner Bros.
- Producers: Adam Anders; Peer Åström

Cee Lo Green chronology
The Lady Killer (2010)	Cee Lo's Magic Moment (2012)	Heart Blanche (2015)

Cee Lo's Magic Moment is the first Christmas studio album and overall fourth studio album released by American singer Cee Lo Green on October 29, 2012, in the United Kingdom. It was released to the US on October 30 by Elektra Records. Green's versions of "Mary, Did You Know?" and "What Christmas Means to Me" peaked at numbers 22 and 23 on the December 22, 2012 R&B Songs chart in the United States. The album sold 181,000 copies in the United States in 2012. It is Cee Lo Green's first solo album to not contain a Parental Advisory label.

== Background ==
The album features Green's interpretations of classic Christmas and seasonal songs. The album features collaborations with Rod Stewart, Christina Aguilera, Straight No Chaser, Trombone Shorty and The Muppets. Stewart and The Muppets joined Green for a performance of the festive set at the Planet Hollywood Resort and Casino in Las Vegas on October 10, 2012. The special was filmed and premiered on Warner Music Group's YouTube channel on November 26.

A music video was produced for "All I Need Is Love", which featured Cee-Lo, the Muppets and Craig Robinson, as well as Muppet performers Steve Whitmire, Eric Jacobson, Dave Goelz, Bill Barretta, David Rudman, Matt Vogel, and Peter Linz.

== Critical reception ==
Professional ratings
Aggregate scores
Source	Rating
Metacritic	63/100
Review scores
Source	Rating
AllMusic	4/5 stars
The Daily Telegraph	4/5 stars
The Guardian	3/5 stars
NME	5/10
Pitchfork	5.9/10
PopMatters	3/10 stars
Slant Magazine	4/5 stars

Cee Lo's Magic Moment received generally positive reviews from music critics. At Metacritic, which assigns a normalized rating out of 100 to reviews from mainstream critics, the album received an average score of 63 based on 9 reviews, which indicates "generally favorable reviews".

== Commercial performance ==
In the United States, the album debuted at No. 25 on the Billboard 200 albums chart on its first week of release, selling around 43,689 copies. It also peaked at No. 4 on Billboard's Top R&B/Hip-Hop Albums, and No. 6 on the Holiday Albums chart. It was ranked No. 153 on the 2013 Year End Billboard 200 chart. As of October 2015, the album has sold 225,000 copies in the US.

== Track listing ==
Cee Lo's Magic Moment
No.	Title	Writer(s)	Length
1.	"What Christmas Means to Me"	Anna Gordy Gaye, George Gordy, Allen Story	3:17
2.	"Baby, It's Cold Outside" (featuring Christina Aguilera)	Frank Loesser	4:03
3.	"This Christmas"	Nadine McKinnor, Donny Hathaway	3:21
4.	"The Christmas Song"	Mel Tormé, Bob Wells	3:50
5.	"White Christmas"	Irving Berlin	3:10
6.	"All I Need Is Love" (featuring Disney's The Muppets)	Adam Anders, Peer Åström, Piero Umiliani	3:47
7.	"You're a Mean One, Mr. Grinch" (featuring Straight No Chaser)	Albert Hague, Theodor "Dr. Seuss" Geisel	3:17
8.	"Please Come Home for Christmas"	Charles Brown, Gene Redd	3:10
9.	"Run Rudolph Run"	Johnny Marks, Marvin Brodie	3:27
10.	"All I Want for Christmas"	Mariah Carey, Walter Afanasieff	4:11
11.	"Mary, Did You Know?"	Buddy Greene, Mark Lowry	3:54
12.	"River"	Joni Mitchell	4:01
13.	"Merry Christmas, Baby" (featuring Rod Stewart & Trombone Shorty)	Lou Baxter, Johnny Moore	3:51
14.	"Silent Night"	Joseph Mohr, Franz Xaver Gruber	4:35
Total length:			51:55

== Charts ==
=== Weekly charts ===
Chart (2012)	Peak position
US Billboard 200	25
US Top Holiday Albums (Billboard)	6
US Top R&B/Hip-Hop Albums (Billboard)	4

=== Year-end charts ===
Chart (2013)	Position
US Billboard 200	153
US Top R&B/Hip-Hop Albums (Billboard)	38

== Release history ==
Region	Date	Format(s)	Label
United Kingdom	October 29, 2012	CD, digital download	Warner Bros.
United States	October 30, 2012	CD, digital download	Elektra
