= TYKU =

American alcoholic beverage company

TYKU Sake & Spirits
- Company type: Privately held
- Industry: Beverages
- Founded: 2004
- Headquarters: New York, New York, U.S.
- Products: Sake and spirits
- Website: www.tykusake.com

TYKU /taɪkuː/ is an American alcoholic beverage company that specializes in sake and other spirits. The privately held company was founded in 2004 and is headquartered in New York City. While based in New York, TYKU's beverages are made in Japan through a joint venture with two sake breweries. TYKU's products are sold in all 50 states.

== History ==
Co-founders Kirk Spahn and Trenton Ulicny met in 2003 while working on a graduate school project together at the School of International and Public Affairs, Columbia University. With the encouragement of their professor, the two founded the company in 2004 with the goal of marketing Japanese-style alcoholic beverages to American consumers.

Spahn, as a history major at Dartmouth College, learned the importance of drinking traditions in East Asian culture as he sampled rice wine in China, Tibet Autonomous Region, and Japan as part of a program with the New York Museum of Natural History. The company seeks to educate American consumers on Japanese sake and spirits using social media initiatives and a branded presence at popular youth-driven events such as South by Southwest.

== Products ==
| Name | Type | Description |
|---|---|---|
| TYKU Sake White | Junmai | Polished to 70%, Akebono rice |
| TYKU Sake Black | Junmai Ginjo | Polished to 55%, Yamada-Nishiki & Akebono rice |
| TYKU Sake Platinum | Junmai Daiginjo | Polished to 45%, Yamada-Nishiki rice |
| TYKU Sake Benihana | Tokubetsu Junmai | Polished to 70%, Akebono rice |
| TYKU Coconut Sake | Infused Nigori | Polished to 70%, Akebono rice |
| TYKU Cucumber Sake | Infused Junmai | Polished to 70%, Akebono rice |
| TYKU Soju | Premium | TYKU Soju: 60 calories |
| TYKU Citrus Liqueur | Premium | TYKU Citrus: 65 calories; first product |

== Awards ==
| Award | Product | Awarding Body | Year |
|---|---|---|---|
| Double Gold Medal | TYKU Soju | WSWA Tasting Competition | 2012 |
| Double Gold Medal | TYKU Platinum Junmai Daiginjo Sake | S.F. Int'l Wine Competition | 2010 |
| Platinum Medal | TYKU White Junmai Sake | World Wine Competition | 2010 |
| Gold Medal | TYKY Citrus Liqueur | L.A. Int'l Spirits Competition | - |

== Celebrity partnerships ==
TYKU has a number of celebrity investors. In October 2010, the company announced Perez Hilton as investor and equity partner. In addition, Hilton took on the role of Director of Culture and Trends. TYKU also announced in March 2012 Patti Stanger as an owner and partner. Stanger is also a part of TYKU's day-to-day business, working to extend the brand's exposure. Other investors include Ne-Yo, Todd English, Brian Vickers and Dhani Jones. In April 2012 Cee Lo Green became an owner and spokesperson for the brand.
