= Cee-Lo Green and His Perfect Imperfections =

2002 studio album by Cee-Lo Green

Studio album by Cee-Lo
- Released: April 23, 2002
- Studio: Cock of the Walk Studio
- Genres: Hip-hop; soul
- Length: 73:26
- Label: Arista
- Producers: Cee Lo Green; Gaelle Adisson (co.); Eric Stamile (co,)

Cee-Lo chronology
Cee-Lo Green and His Perfect Imperfections (2002)	Cee-Lo Green... Is the Soul Machine (2004)

Singles from Cee-Lo Green and His Perfect Imperfections
- 1. "Closet Freak" Released: 2002; 2. "Gettin' Grown" Released: 2002

Professional ratings
Review scores
Source	Rating
AllMusic	3.5/5 stars
Alternative Press	8/10
Entertainment Weekly	B+
The Guardian	4/5 stars
Los Angeles Times	3.5/4 stars
NME	6/10
Q	4/5 stars
Rolling Stone	3.5/5 stars
Spin	6/10
Vibe	4/5

Cee-Lo Green and His Perfect Imperfections is the debut studio album by American singer-songwriter CeeLo Green, released on April 23, 2002. The album features guest appearances from Jahalla, Kirkland Underground, John Popper (of Blues Traveler), Joey Huffman and fellow Dungeon Family rappers Big Gipp and Backbone.

== Track listing ==
No.	Title	Writer(s)	Producer(s)	Length
1.	"Bad Mutha"	Cee-Lo Green; James Johnson; Tim "Herb" Alexander	Cee-Lo Green	4:03
2.	"Close Encounter (Break)"			0:22
3.	"Big Ole Words (Damn)"	Green	Green; Gaelle Adisson (co.); Eric Stamile (co.)	4:56
4.	"Closet Freak"	Green	Green; Adisson (co.); Stamile (co.)	3:38
5.	"Live (Right Now)"	Green	Green; Adisson (co.); Stamile (co.)	4:05
6.	"El Dorado Sunrise (Super Chicken)"	Green	Green	5:32
7.	"A Thug's Concern (Break)"			0:08
8.	"One For The Road"	Green	Green	5:36
9.	"Let Him Sing If He Wants To (Break)"			0:20
10.	"Spend the Night in Your Mind"	Green	Green; Adisson (co.); Stamile (co.)	5:35
11.	"Suga Baby" (featuring Big Gipp & Backbone)	Green; Jamahr Williams; Cameron Gipp	Green	4:21
12.	"Gettin' Grown"	Green	Green	4:14
13.	"Bass Head Jazz"	Green	Green; Adisson (co.); Stamile (co.)	3:33
14.	"Microhard" (featuring Jahalla & Kirkland Underground)	Green	Green; Adisson (co.); Stamile (co.)	5:23
15.	"Under tha Influence (Follow Me)"	Green	Green	4:56
16.	"Medieval Times (Great Pretender)"	Green	Green	3:42
17.	"Country Love" (featuring John Popper)	Green	Green	4:55
18.	"Awful Thing"	Green; Mark Davis	Green	3:42
19.	"Maintenance Man (Break)"			0:14
20.	"Young Man (Sierra's Song)"	Green	Green	4:03
21.	"Well Damn, Lo (Break)"			0:10
