= Heart Blanche =

Studio album by CeeLo Green
- Released: November 6, 2015
- Genres: Soul; neo soul
- Length: 53:12
- Label: Atlantic
- Producers: CeeLo Green; Alex 'AK' Kresovich; Brian Kennedy; Carrillo; Charlie Puth; Cook Classics; Daniel Ledinsky; Eg White; The Futuristics; Jack Splash; Jamil "Digi" Chammas; John Hill; Jon Bellion; Mark Ronson; Sean Phelan; Sonny J Mason; Tommy Hittz

CeeLo Green chronology
Cee Lo's Magic Moment (2012)	Heart Blanche (2015)	CeeLo Green Is Thomas Callaway (2020)

Heart Blanche is the fifth studio album by American recording artist CeeLo Green. The album was released on November 6, 2015, by Atlantic Records. This is Green's first album to featured all-new material since 2010's The Lady Killer.

== Critical reception ==
Professional ratings
Aggregate scores
Source	Rating
Metacritic	57/100
Review scores
Source	Rating
AllMusic	3.5/5 stars
Exclaim!	6/10
The Guardian	2/5 stars
HipHopDX	3/5 stars
The Independent	4/5 stars
NME	3/5
PopMatters	5/10 stars
Rolling Stone	2/5 stars
Slant Magazine	1.5/5 stars
Spin	5/10

Heart Blanche received generally mixed reviews from music critics. At Metacritic, which assigns a normalized rating out of 100 to reviews from mainstream critics, the album received an average score of 57 based on 14 reviews, which indicates "mixed or average reviews". Ryan B. Patrick of Exclaim! wrote that "Heart Blanche, while delivering Green's usually masterful take on gospel-influenced and pop-minded R&B, feels listless and lacks passion."

== Track listing ==
No.	Title	Writer(s)	Producer(s)	Length
1.	"Heart Blanche Intro"	Thomas Callaway; Elton John; Sean Phelan; Bernie Taupin	CeeLo Green; Phelan	1:22
2.	"Est. 1980'S"	Callaway; Joshua Matthews; John Meredith; Kaveh Rastegar; Jeremy Ruzumna	John Hill	3:31
3.	"Mother May I"	Callaway; Duke Baxter; Mark Ronson; Pat Vegas	Ronson	4:59
4.	"Working Class Heroes (Work)"	Callaway; Phelan; Charlie Puth	Green; Phelan; Puth; Carrillo	2:57
5.	"Tonight"	Callaway; John Miles; Phelan	Green; Phelan; Carrillo	4:30
6.	"Robin Williams"	Callaway; Jon Bellion; Mark Williams	Bellion	3:30
7.	"Sign of the Times"	Callaway; Bob James; William Lobban-Bean; Jacob Luttrell	Green; Cook Classics	3:00
8.	"CeeLo Green Sings the Blues"	Callaway; Solomon Burke; Phelan	Phelan; Jamil "Digi" Chammas	4:07
9.	"Music to My Soul"	Callaway; Geoffrey Early; Joe Khajadourian; Daniel Ledinsky; Lobban-Bean; Nathan Payton; Andreas Pfannenstill; Alex Schwartz	Classics; The Futuristics; Tommy Hittz	2:52
10.	"Race Against Time"	Callaway; Matthews; Meredith; Rastegar; Ruzumna	Green; Hill	4:32
11.	"Better Late Than Never"	Callaway; Jack Splash	Splash	3:50
12.	"Smells Like Fire"	Callaway; Brian Kennedy	Hill; Kennedy	4:08
13.	"Purple Hearts (Soldier of Love)"	Callaway; Nikola Bedingfield; Francis White	Eg White	3:32
14.	"Thorns"	Callaway; Hayden Frank; Samuel Harris; Alex Kresovich	Sonny J Mason; Alex 'AK' Kresovich	3:31
15.	"The Glory Games"	Callaway; Rudie Edwards; Ledinsky	Ledinsky	2:52

== Personnel ==
- CeeLo Green - Primary Artist, Composer, Producer
- Elton John - Composer
- Bernie Taupin - Composer
- Eg White - Bass, Drums, Guitar, Producer, Programming, Synthesizer
- Mark Ronson - Composer, Producer
- Charlie Puth - Composer, Producer, Programming
- Sean Phelan - Composer, Engineer, Instrumentation, Mixing, Producer, Programming
- Jack Splash - Arranger, Composer, Engineer, Producer
- Manny Marroquin - Mixing
- Jaycen Joshua - Mixing
- Tomas Carrillo - Guitar, Programming
- John Wicks- Composer, Drummer
- Nick Valentin - Assistant Engineer
- Chris Gehringer - Mastering
- Craig Rosen - A&R

== Charts ==
Chart (2015)	Peak position
Hungarian Albums (MAHASZ)	12
UK Albums (Official Charts)	43
