= Only You (Cee Lo Green song) =

Single by Cee Lo Green featuring Lauriana Mae
- Released: January 2013
- Recorded: 2012
- Genre: Pop
- Length: 3:59
- Label: Atlantic Records
- Songwriter: Skylar Grey

Cee Lo Green featuring Lauriana Mae singles chronology
"Fight to Win" (2012)	"Only You" (2013)

Music video
- Video on YouTube

"Only You" is a song by American recording artist CeeLo Green, released by Atlantic Records in January 2013. The song, which features guest vocals from American singer Lauriana Mae, was co-written by Green alongside fellow American singer-songwriter, Skylar Grey. On April 17, 2013, Green and Mae performed "Only You" on The Ellen DeGeneres Show.
