= CeeLo Green Is Thomas Callaway =

Studio album by CeeLo Green
- Released: June 26, 2020
- Studios: Easy Eye Sound (Nashville, Tennessee)
- Genre: Soul
- Length: 39:49
- Labels: Easy Eye; BMG
- Producer: Dan Auerbach

CeeLo Green chronology
Heart Blanche (2015)	CeeLo Green Is Thomas Callaway (2020)

Professional ratings
Review scores
Source	Rating
AllMusic	3.5/5 stars
Metro	3/5 stars
Tom Hull	B

CeeLo Green Is Thomas Callaway is the sixth solo studio album by American singer CeeLo Green. It was released on June 26, 2020, via Easy Eye Sound and BMG Rights Management. Recording sessions took place at Easy Eye Sound Studios in Nashville, Tennessee. Production was handled by Dan Auerbach. It was his first project in nearly 5 years since Heart Blanche (2015).

== Track listing ==
CeeLo Green Is Thomas Callaway track listing
No.	Title	Writer(s)	Length
1.	"For You"	Dan Auerbach; Thomas Callaway; Roger Cook	3:21
2.	"Lead Me"	Auerbach; Callaway; Bobby Wood	3:39
3.	"Little Mama"	Auerbach; Callaway; Paul Overstreet	2:50
4.	"Don't Lie"	Auerbach; Callaway; Wood	3:13
5.	"I Wonder How Love Feels"	Auerbach; Callaway; Wood	3:02
6.	"People Watching"	Auerbach; Callaway; Overstreet	3:51
7.	"You Gotta Do It All"	Auerbach; Callaway; Wood	4:05
8.	"Doing It All Together"	Auerbach; Callaway; Wood	2:35
9.	"Slow Down"	Auerbach; Wood; John Anderson	3:29
10.	"Down with the Sun"	Auerbach; Callaway; David R. Ferguson	3:20
11.	"Thinking Out Loud"	Auerbach; Callaway; Cook	3:03
12.	"The Way"	Auerbach; Callaway; Ferguson	3:21
Total length:			39:49

== Personnel ==
- Thomas Callaway – vocals
- Ashley Wilcoxson – background vocals
- Leisa Hans – background vocals
- Dan Auerbach – background vocals (tracks: 3, 4, 11), guitar, bass guitar and percussion (track 5), Mellotron (track 7), engineering, producer
- Bobby Wood – electric piano and Wurlitzer (tracks: 1, 4–8, 11, 12), electric guitar (tracks: 2–5, 9, 10), bells (track 4), Hammond B3 and organ (track 5)
- Ray Jacildo – Hammond B3, glockenspiel and vibraphone (tracks: 2, 5, 8–10), organ (tracks: 3, 4, 6, 11, 12), bells (tracks: 4, 7, 11), synthesizer (track 7), harpsichord (tracks: 11, 12)
- Mike Rojas – piano, harpsichord (tracks: 1, 2, 8–10, 12), clavinet (tracks: 2, 6–10, 12), vibraphone and glockenspiel (tracks: 2, 3, 8–10, 12), bells (track 7)
- Billy Sanford – electric guitar (tracks: 1, 2, 4, 6–12), electric piano and Wurlitzer (track 3), guitar (track 9)
- Russ Pahl – electric guitar, sitar (track 5)
- Dave Roe – bass
- Matt Combs – strings (tracks: 1, 5, 8–10)
- Gene Chrisman – drums, percussion (tracks: 2, 8–12)
- Chris St. Hillaire – percussion (tracks: 3, 8–10, 12)
- Roy Agee – trombone (tracks: 5, 12), horn (tracks: 6, 9, 10)
- Caleb VanBuskirk – engineering
- Allen Parker – engineering
- Alex Skelton – engineering
- Trey Keller – engineering
- Josh Ditty – engineering
- Ryan Smith – engineering
