= Buddy Greene =

American musician (born 1953)

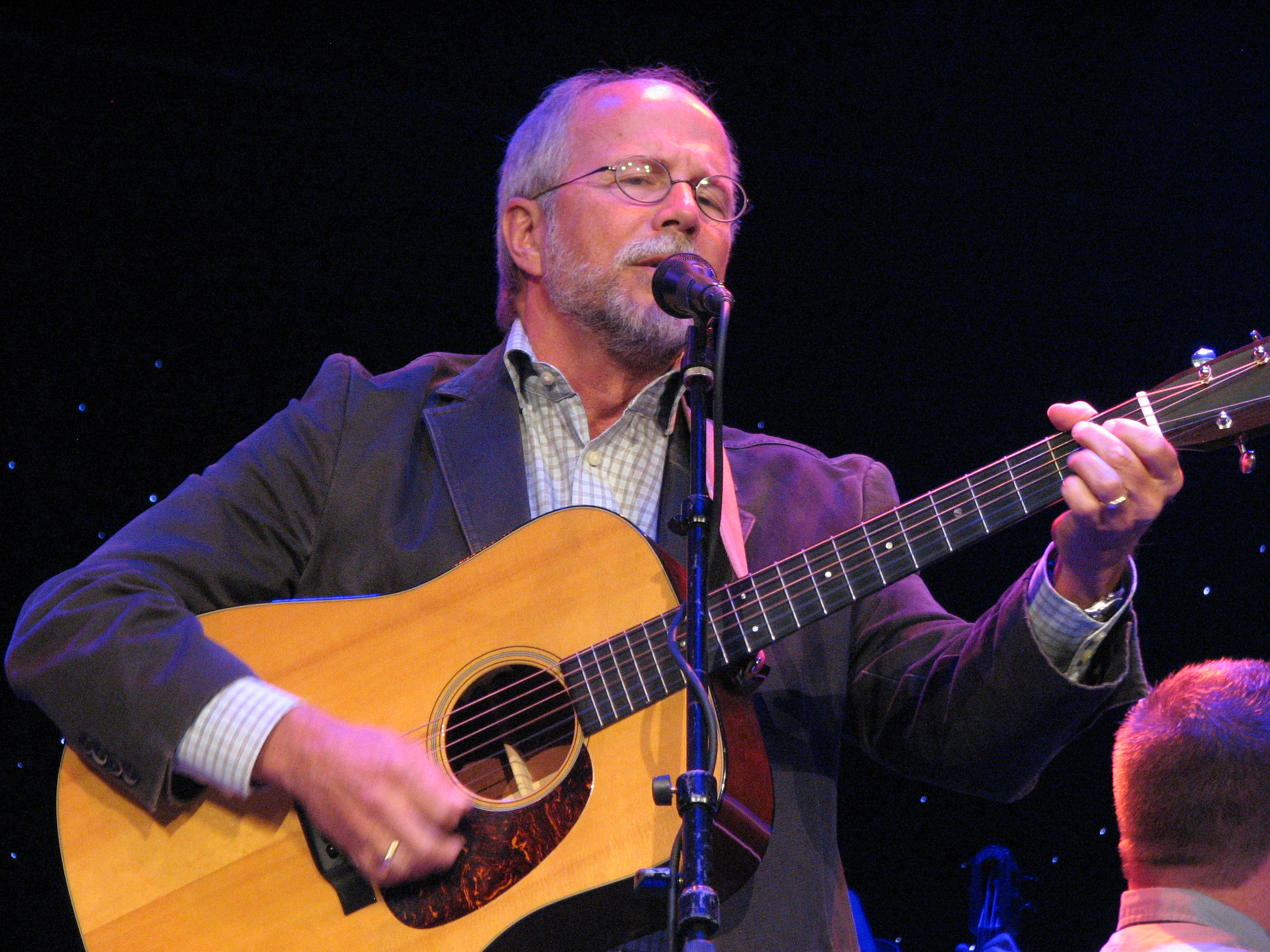
- Greene performing in 2015.

Background information
- Born: October 30, 1953 (age 72)
- Genres: Gospel music; Southern gospel; country music; bluegrass music
- Occupations: Singer; songwriter; musician
- Instruments: Vocals; harmonica; guitar
- Years active: 1983–present
- Formerly of: Jerry Reed, Uncle Ernie Brand, Buddy's Buddies

Buddy Greene (born October 30, 1953) is an American singer, songwriter, guitar player, and harmonica player. Most of his recordings consist of gospel music with a distinctly Southern gospel flavor. Much of his music is influenced by country music and bluegrass music. Greene grew up in Macon, Georgia. He has written the music for many songs and also co-wrote the Christmas song "Mary, Did You Know?" with Mark Lowry; Greene also wrote "Recovering Pharisee" recorded by Del McCoury, and "He Is" recorded by Ashley Cleveland.

== Discography ==
- Praise You, Lord (Fortress) – 1986
- Praise Harmonica (Fortress) – 1987
- Slice of Life (Fortress)
- Sojourner's Song (Word) – 1990
- Grace for the Moment – 1994
- Buddy Greene & Friends Live (Fortress) – 1992
- Minstrel of the Lord (Fortress) – 1995
- Simple Praise (Fortress) – 1996
- Christmas …Not Just Any Night – 1998
- Re: Sinners & Saints (Ministry Music) – 2000
- Rufus (Rufus) – 2002
- Pilgrimage: A Collection of Favorites (Spring Hill)
- *Hymns and Prayer Songs (Spring Hill Music) – 2004
- Happy Man (Rufus) – 2007
- A Few More Years – 2009
- The Best of Buddy Greene: From the Homecoming Series (Gaither Music Group) – 2010
- Harmonica Anthology (Rufus) – 2011
- December's Song – 2013
- Someday – 2016
- Looking Back (Rufus) – 2017
- GrassHarper - 2026

== Charts ==
Title	Chart (2011)	Peak position
The Best of Buddy Greene: From The Homecoming Series	US Top Christian Albums (Billboard)	20
