= CeeLo Green =

American singer (born 1975)

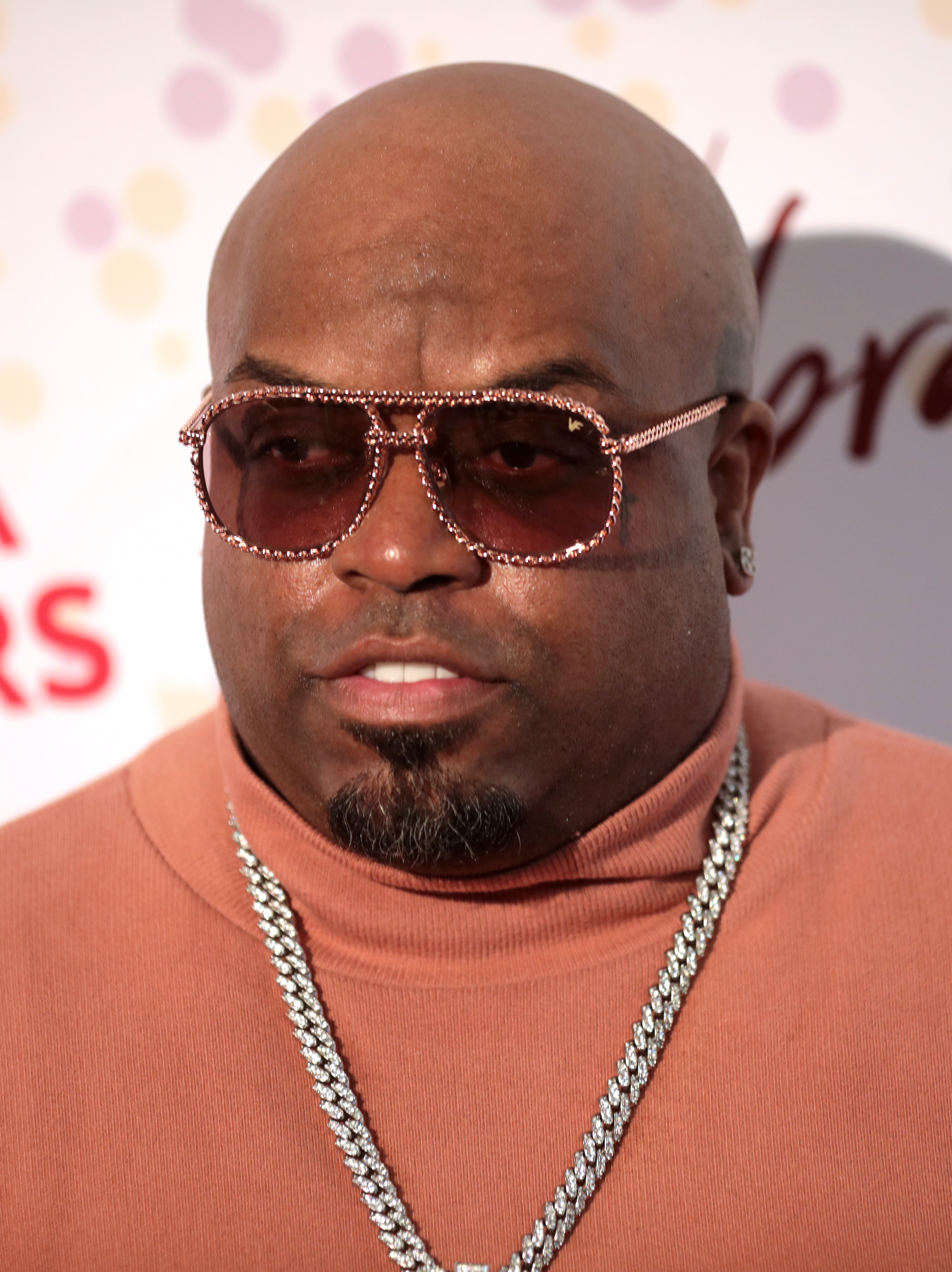
- Green in 2022

Background information
- Also known as: Thomas Burton
- Born: Thomas DeCarlo Callaway; May 30, 1975 (age 51); Atlanta, Georgia, U.S.
- Genres: Soul; R&B; pop; Southern hip-hop; funk; gospel
- Occupations: Singer; songwriter; rapper; record producer; actor
- Works: Recording; production
- Years active: 1991–present
- Labels: Easy Eye; Atlantic; BMG; Warner Bros.; Roadrunner; Elektra; Arista; LaFace
- Member of: Goodie Mob
- Formerly of: Dungeon Family; Gnarls Barkley
- Children: 1
- Website: ceelogreen.com

Thomas DeCarlo Callaway-Burton (born May 30, 1975), known professionally as CeeLo Green (or Cee Lo Green or simply Cee-Lo), is an American singer, songwriter, rapper, record producer, and actor. Born and raised in Atlanta, Georgia, he gained initial prominence as a member of the Southern hip-hop group Goodie Mob in 1991. After three albums with the group, Green signed with Arista Records to release his solo albums Cee-Lo Green and His Perfect Imperfections (2002) and Cee-Lo Green... Is the Soul Machine (2004). He is known for his soul-infused delivery in hip-hop and R&B, displayed in his signature song "Crazy" (with Danger Mouse as "Gnarls Barkley") and his solo single "Fuck You".

Green formed Gnarls Barkley, a collaborative duo with record producer Danger Mouse, in 2003. Their 2006 single, "Crazy", peaked within the top five of the Billboard Hot 100 and UK singles chart, as well as 18 other international charts; it preceded the duo's debut album, St. Elsewhere (2006), which was followed by their second album, The Odd Couple (2008). In 2010, Green resumed his solo career with his funk-inspired third album The Lady Killer, which spawned his biggest solo hit, "Fuck You" (more commonly censored as "Forget You"). The song peaked at number two on the Billboard Hot 100, entered the top ten of 13 countries, and won Best Urban/Alternative Performance at the 53rd Annual Grammy Awards. He has since released three further solo albums: Cee Lo's Magic Moment (2012), Heart Blanche (2015), and CeeLo Green Is Thomas Callaway (2020), as well as two reunion albums with Goodie Mob: Age Against the Machine (2013) and Survival Kit (2020).

From 2011 to 2013, Green was a judge and coach on the American reality television competition The Voice, appearing on four of its seasons. (Note: Excluding his appearance as a non-competitive performer on the sixteenth episode of the fourth season.) He voiced Murray the Mummy in the 2012 animated feature film Hotel Transylvania, and also appeared in numerous television programs and films including his own short-lived series, CeeLo Green's The Good Life on TBS. Green has appeared in various commercials, including for 7 Up, Duracell, M&M's, and sake brand TYKU. His work has earned a number of accolades, including five Grammy Awards, a BET Award, a Billboard Music Award, and a Brit Award.

== Early life ==
Green was born on May 30, 1975, in Atlanta, Georgia. Both of his parents were firefighters. His father died when Green was two years old. He attended Riverside Military Academy in Gainesville, Georgia. Green's mother was paralyzed in a car crash when Green was 16 and died in 1993 when Green was 18.

Green started his music career in church. At the time of his mother's death, Green's career with Goodie Mob had just taken off. He subsequently struggled with suicidal thoughts, which Green later wrote about in various songs throughout his career, including Goodie Mob's "Free" and Gnarls Barkley's "Just a Thought". He would specifically address the deaths of his parents in "She Knows" and "A Little Better", from Gnarls Barkley's The Odd Couple (2008), and "Guess Who", from Goodie Mob's Soul Food (1995). In an excerpt of CeeLo Distilled, a documentary produced by Absolut and the Fader, Green explained that his mother's death led him toward "crossing that threshold over into a career".

== Music career ==
=== 1991–98: Early career with Goodie Mob ===
Along with Big Gipp, T-Mo, and Khujo, Green was an original member of the Atlanta hip-hop group Goodie Mob. He was the youngest of the four. The Goodie Mob was a part of the Atlanta rap collective the Dungeon Family, which also included Outkast. Goodie Mob appeared on two tracks on OutKast's 1994 debut album Southernplayalisticadillacmuzik, with Green providing vocals for "Call of da Wild" and "Git Up, Git Out".

Goodie Mob released their debut album, Soul Food, in 1995. The album received much critical praise as a pioneering record for the emerging Southern rap scene. It featured a distinctive soulful southern sound by production team Organized Noize.

During this time, Green also contributed backing vocals to TLC's hit 1995 song "Waterfalls".

The group's second album, Still Standing, came out in 1998 and also received much critical praise. Its commercial performance was slightly lower than the group's previous effort, however. Green took more creative control on the group's next album, World Party, which was released in 1999.

=== 1999–2003: Move to Arista ===
Around 1999, during the making of the album World Party, Green left Goodie Mob to pursue a solo career with Arista Records and the remaining members continued to perform together under the Goodie Mob name with Koch Records. They did, however, collaborate in combinations on the Dungeon Family album Even in Darkness (2001).

The song "Hold On" from Big Boi's Got Purp? Vol. 2 album was the first newly recorded Goodie Mob song with all four members since World Party.

Green was one of ten guest musicians who contributed to the 1999 Santana album Supernatural. Lauryn Hill wrote "Do You Like the Way", and she and Green both provided lead vocals. Green also contributed to the track "We're All Gonna Die" on the 2000 album Eat at Whitey's by Everlast, and the song "Reverse" on the 2000 album Forever by Puff Daddy.

Green's Arista career was short-lived, as he was dropped after two albums due to low record sales. His first album, Cee-Lo Green and His Perfect Imperfections (2002), was much in the vein of other Dungeon Family releases, with southern soul/funk/jazz backings produced by Green and featuring appearances by fellow Dungeon Family members Big Gipp and Backbone. The album did not sell very well, but Green achieved some airplay with the single "Closet Freak".

=== 2004–08: Second solo album and formation of Gnarls Barkley ===
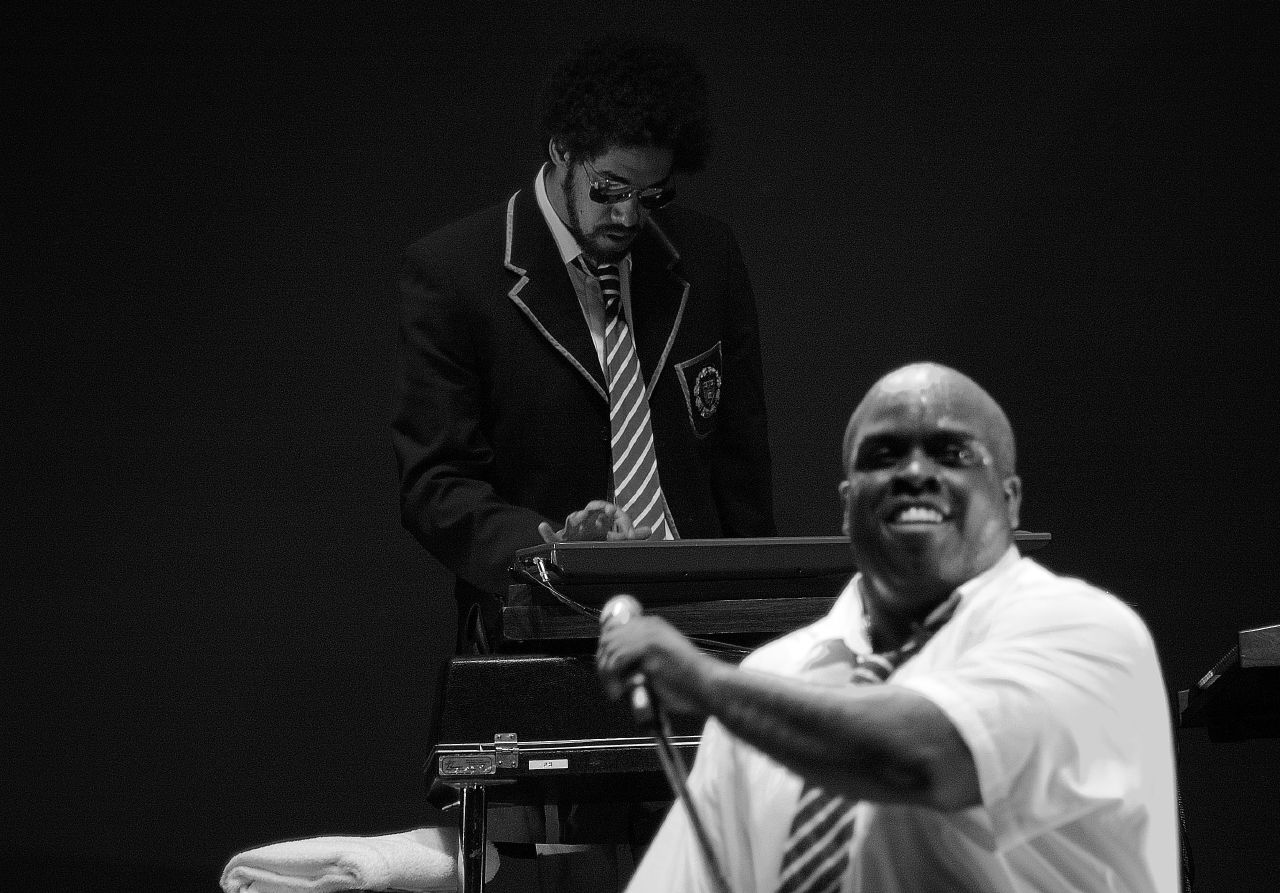
Green (front) with Danger Mouse (back)

His second Arista album, Cee-Lo Green... Is the Soul Machine (2004), brought a more branched-out sound and more deeply explored southern rap music. This is evidenced by collaborations with "the biggest hip-hop musicians of all time", including Ludacris, T.I., and Pharrell Williams. The album debuted and peaked at number 2 on the Billboard Top R&B/Hip Hop Album chart. It received critical acclaim and was described as "one of the most ambitious albums to come out of any genre in recent times."

Along with DJ Danger Mouse, Green formed a duo called Gnarls Barkley. Green first met Danger Mouse at a University of Georgia event. They later collaborated on the remix of the Danger Mouse and Jemini song "What U Sittin' On?" from the 2004 album Ghetto Pop Life, before working together again on the song "Benzie Box" from the 2005 Danger Doom album The Mouse and The Mask, where Green sings the chorus.

Gnarls Barkley's first album, St. Elsewhere, was released on April 24, 2006, in the UK and May 2, 2006, in the United States. St. Elsewhere entered the charts at No.1 in the UK, as did the first single, "Crazy". "Crazy" is the first single to reach number one in the UK based on digital download sales alone and is ranked by Rolling Stone as the greatest song of the decade, thus making it Green's most successful project to date. A second album by Gnarls Barkley, titled The Odd Couple, was released in March 2008. Its first single came out in January, titled "Run (I'm a Natural Disaster)".

Seeing the success achieved by Gnarls Barkley, Arista and Legacy released a 17-track greatest hits collection of songs by Green in 2006, titled Closet Freak: The Best of Cee-Lo Green the Soul Machine. It features predominantly solo tracks by Green and several Goodie Mob songs. Green's song "What Part of Forever" was included on The Twilight Saga: Eclipse soundtrack. In 2008, Green performed a rendition of the 1974 single "Kung Fu Fighting" by Jamaican vocalist Carl Douglas for the animated film Kung Fu Panda.

=== 2009–11: The Lady Killer and solo success ===
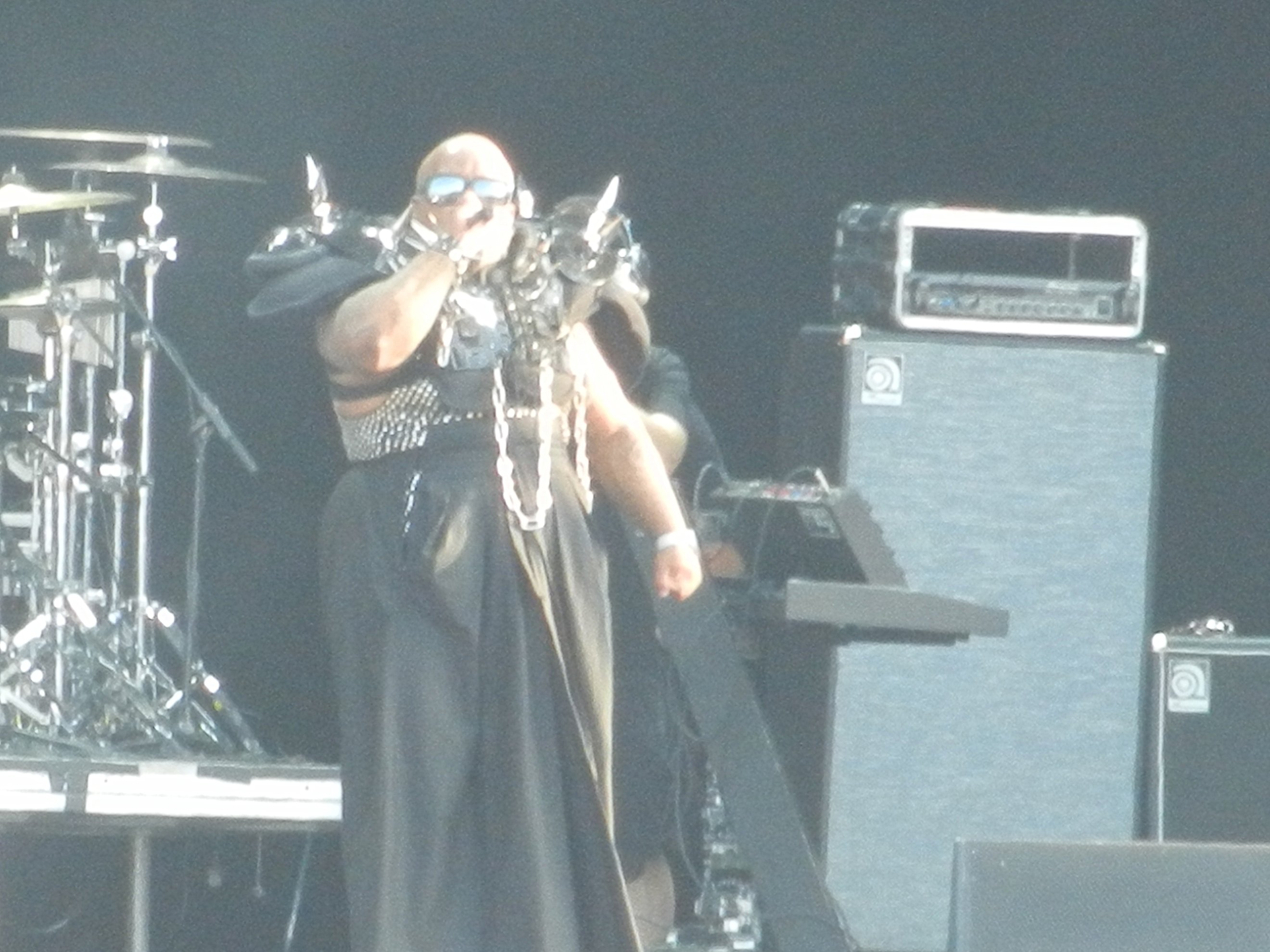
Green performing in 2011

On August 14, 2010, Green released the single "Fuck You!" to YouTube ahead of his planned solo album release, due to its partial leak on April 13. "Fuck You!" was an instant viral smash hit, registering over two million plays in less than a week. Two weeks later on September 1, Green released an official music video for the song on YouTube. "Fuck You!" made a debut at No.1 on the UK charts, notably beating out "Shame" from the recently reunited Robbie Williams and Gary Barlow.

In October 2010, Green released his first mixtape, Stray Bullets. In an interview with Exclaim!, he said his forthcoming 2010 album The Lady Killer was "a more clear, concise, consistent, conceptual, entire album [than his previous]. It's a complete thought, because it's written to be like a score. The album's meant to be a motion picture, you know? I've never taken that approach to doing an album before." Released on November 8, 2010, the album would go on to reach Double Platinum status in the UK, certified on November 4, 2011. On December 1, 2010, Green received five Grammy nominations for "Fuck You!", which had been certified Gold in the United States and Denmark. The single achieved Platinum status in Canada, New Zealand, and the UK; and multi-platinum status in Australia. A radio-friendly version of the song was recorded, with the title and words "Fuck You!" changed to "Forget You!"

Green toured during 2010 and 2011 with an all-female backing band named "Scarlet Fever" (made up of Sharon Aguilar, Brittany Brooks, Theresa Flaminio, and Regina Zernay Roberts), performing for Taratata, the BBC, the Late Show with David Letterman, W's Symmetry Live Concert Series, Saturday Night Live, the Jimmy Kimmel Live! special show following the Academy Awards, and many other venues. Green also performed "Forget You" with Gwyneth Paltrow and several puppets provided by the Jim Henson Company at the 53rd Annual Grammy Awards on February 13, 2011. His performance was in part an homage to Elton John, who wore a very similar costume in a Muppet Show performance in 1977. At the 2011 BRIT Awards two days later, Green was joined by British vocalist Joelle Bennett for another duet of "Fuck You". Shortly thereafter, it was announced that Green would join Rihanna and J. Cole on the North American leg of Rihanna's Loud Tour in the summer of 2011. However, he later dropped out of the tour, citing his busy work schedule—which included a commitment to judging The Voice, writing a new book, and recording a new album—as the reason for his withdrawal.

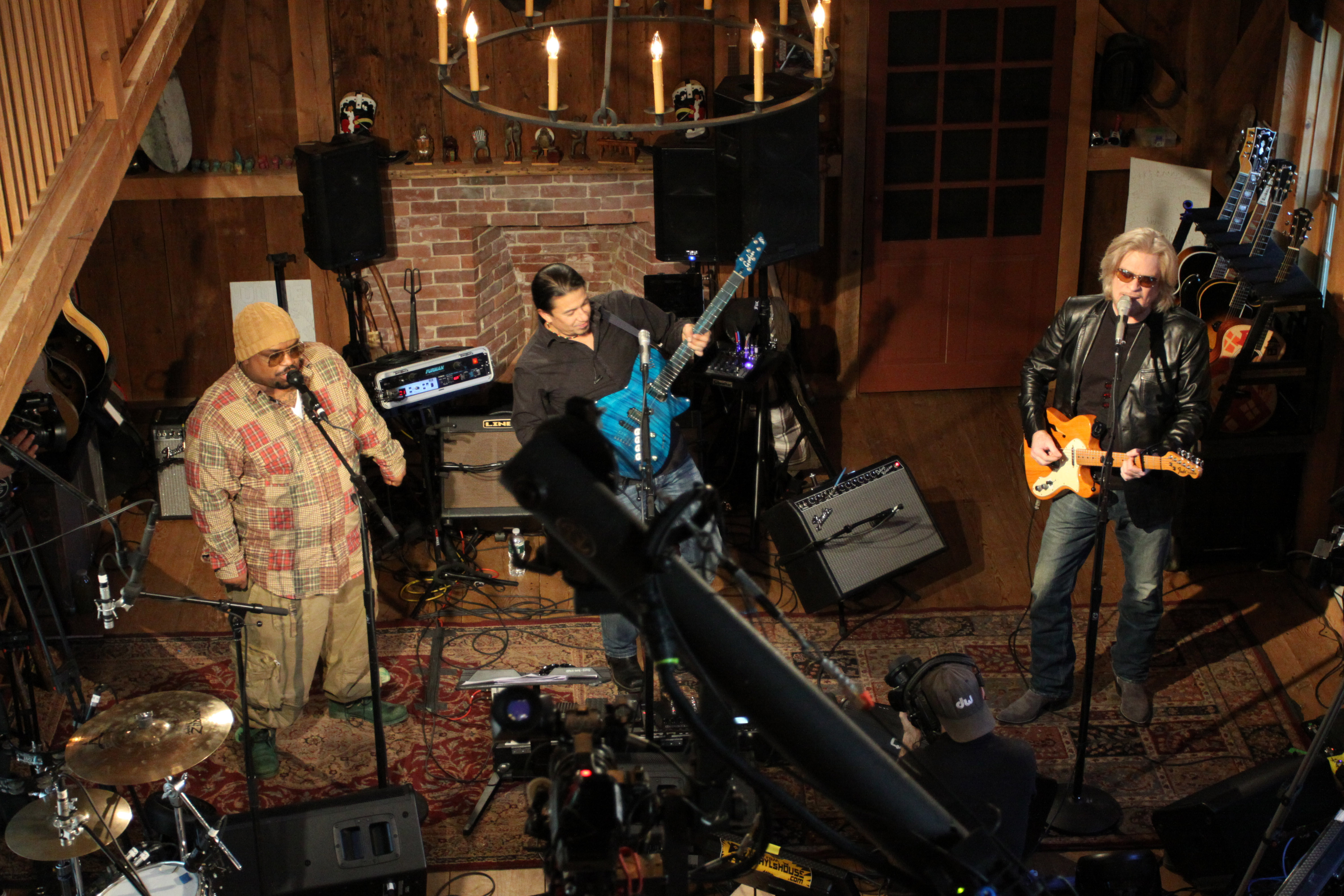
CeeLo Green (left) during a session of Live From Daryl's House

At the April 2011 Coachella Valley Music and Arts Festival, Green had his set cut off while performing and then left the stage. Green had arrived 25 minutes late and performed five songs, including "Fuck You" and Gnarls Barkley's "Crazy". His set was scheduled to end at 5:40 p.m. At 5:44 p.m., as he was apologizing for being late due to air travel delays, the audio from his microphone was cut off. He then angrily exited the stage, amid boos.

On August 14, 2011, Green appeared at WWE SummerSlam, performing "Forget You" and the event's theme, "Bright Lights Bigger City". He also performed at the 2011 Billboard Music Awards. Green re-released his album The Lady Killer as a Platinum Edition on November 28, 2011. The repackaged album contained the original 16 tracks, including remixed versions of "Bright Lights Bigger City" (feat. Wiz Khalifa) and "I Want You (Hold on to Love)", plus one extra track, "Anyway", written by Ross Golan. The new track served as the album's sixth overall single and first Platinum Edition single.

Green recorded and wrote "Language of Love" for the Sex and the City 2 soundtrack. It was rumored in mid-2010 that he was working with Alien Ant Farm on a track slated for appearance on an upcoming album by the band. This was confirmed the following year; however, the track failed to materialize, with Alien Ant Farm singer Dryden Mitchell stating he planned to do a cover of "Easy Lover" with Green, but Green never recorded his parts.

=== 2012–2015: Super Bowl XLVI and autobiography ===
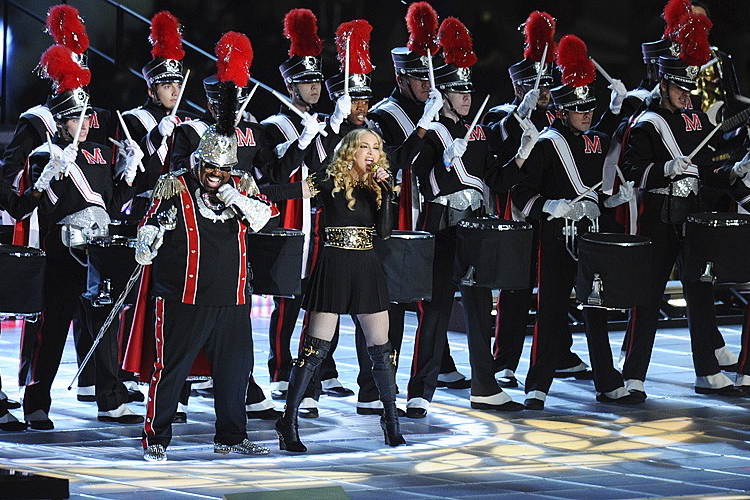
Green (left) performing with Madonna at the Super Bowl XLVI halftime show in 2012

In March 2012, Green performed at a fundraiser for President Barack Obama, who attended. Green began singing "Fuck You" with the original lyrics, but then switched to the clean version. He released the song "I Love Football" in September 2012, set to the tune of "Blitzkrieg Bop" by Ramones. It was chosen by the National Football League as the theme song of Thursday Night Football 2013.

On February 5, 2013, Green released the song "Only You", featuring Lauriana Mae, a contestant on P. Diddy's Starmaker. It was set to be on Green's upcoming fourth album, tentatively titled Girl Power, but in the end did not appear on an album. In the same month, Green kicked off his "CeeLo Green Presents Loberace" concert residency (or simply "Loberace"). Originally intended to be unveiled at the Planet Hollywood Resort and Casino on February 21, the event was rescheduled to a later date after a fatal shooting along the Las Vegas Strip, where the resort is situated. A few months after, on September 10, Green's autobiography Everybody's Brother was released.

From June to August 2014, Green toured alongside Lionel Richie for his North American All the Hits All Night Long tour. Green formed a new band, the Board Memberz, led by musical director Printz Board and consisting of Timothy "Izo" Orindgreff, Lucy Graves, Jazelle Rodriguez, Ashley Dzerigan, Patty A. Miller, and Sojung "Liso" Lee.

=== 2015–present: Heart Blanche ===
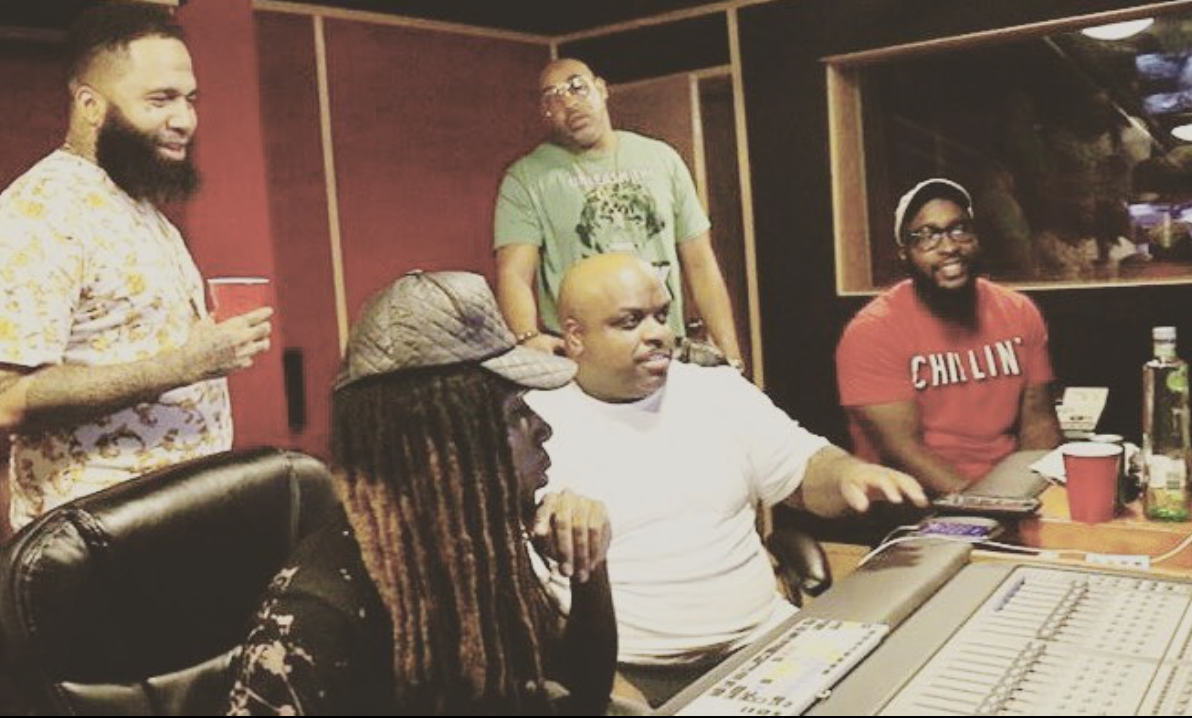
Green in the studio, 2017

In January 2015, Green released a concept mixtape with music derived from a variety of TV show theme songs, titled TV on the Radio. His next studio album, Heart Blanche, was released on November 6, 2015. The lead single, "Robin Williams", named after and dedicated to the actor of the same name, was released on July 17, 2015.

In December 2016, Green released a new song and video, "F**ck Me I'm Famous", under the alias Gnarly Davidson. The artist attended the 59th Grammy Awards in character as Gnarly Davidson, for which he dressed in all gold, complete with a face mask. A few days later, he released another new song and video, titled "Jay-Z's Girl". The song is a reworking of Rick Springfield's "Jessie's Girl", with lyrics changed to be about his admiration for Jay-Z's wife Beyoncé. On July 14, 2017, Green performed at the opening ceremony of the 2017 World Aquatics Championships in Budapest.

Green released two singles, "Lead Me" and "Doing It All Together", in the lead up to his sixth studio album, CeeLo Green Is Thomas Callaway (2020). The album title references his legal name.

Green headlined the ForYouFest at Foxwoods Resort Casino on July 12, 2025, performing alongside TikTok influencers such as Saxquatch, The Boston Deli Boys, and Kayla Murphy. In March 2026, Green featured on Kanye West's album Bully, providing vocals on its title track.

== Television and film appearances ==
Green, along with the rest of the Goodie Mob, were featured performing "Beautiful Skin" (from 1998's Still Standing) on Series 6, Episode 6 ("Bum Rap") of the ABC television sitcom Sister, Sister in October 1998. Green subsequently had a cameo in the 1999 film Mystery Men, as a member of the Not So Goodie Mob, in which he was credited as "Thomas Burton, aka Cee Lo". He has also done voice acting work, voicing Prime Cut Miggity-Mo' Macdaddy Gizzabang Doggy Dog Dog on the Brak Show episode "Brakstreet" in 2002; Frank and Buddy Z in Class of 3000's Christmas special; Godzilla, The Tablesmasher, and a dog in the Robot Chicken episode "Squaw Bury Shortcake" in 2007; and Rev. Rollo Goodlove in the Boondocks episodes "The S-Word" and "The Hunger Strike" in 2008. In 2010, he appeared in T-Pain's Freaknik: The Musical as Light Skin.

On January 15, 2011, Green both acted and performed in an episode of NBC's Saturday Night Live hosted by Gwyneth Paltrow, who, in November 2010, had covered his song "Forget You" in an episode of Glee. Green was one of the coaches for contestants on seasons 1 through 3 of the singing TV show The Voice. He retired as a coach in the fifth season.

On Series 9, Episode 6 of The Graham Norton Show broadcast on May 20, 2011, Green performed I Want You (Hold On to Love) in the studio and he was interviewed about its release after the performance.

On August 14, 2011, Green appeared at WWE SummerSlam and performed both "Bright Lights Bigger City", the official theme song for the event, and his hit "Forget You". On September 25, 2011, Green appeared as himself in a live-action/voice appearance and as the voice of a hot tub in the American Dad! episode "Hot Water". On October 18, 2011, Green guest-starred on the NBC series Parenthood in the episode "Tales From the Luncheonette". The following year, on February 5, Green appeared in the Super Bowl halftime show with Madonna. On March 31, 2012, he appeared on the 2012 Kids' Choice Awards. On August 8, he played J.C. Carpenter in the TV Land sitcom The Soul Man, in the episode "J.C. Carpenter's Gospel Show". Ten days later, he guest-starred in the Nickelodeon show How to Rock in the episode "How to Rock Cee Lo". That year, he also lent his voice to the animated feature Hotel Transylvania as Murray the Mummy.

On February 28, 2013, Green appeared as himself in the sitcom Anger Management, in the episode "Charlie & Cee Lo". The same year, he appeared in the film Begin Again. Green performed at the Singapore Social Star Awards on May 23–24, 2013.

On June 23, 2014, Green premiered his new reality-based docu-comedy television series CeeLo Green's The Good Life on TBS, in which he appears with the other members of Goodie Mob. On September 2, TBS announced that they were canceling the show in the wake of Green's controversial comments on the nature of rape. Sony Pictures Animation also severed ties with Green, who was scheduled to reprise his role from Hotel Transylvania for its sequel, Hotel Transylvania 2, opting to replace him with actor Keegan-Michael Key. Green competed against comedian Russell Peters in an episode of Lip Sync Battle that aired on May 26, 2016. He won with performances of the Sugarhill Gang's "Rapper's Delight" and "Rock and Roll All Nite" by Kiss.

In 2017, Green guest-starred in the Cartoon Network series Teen Titans Go!, acting as himself and CeeLo Bear in the first and fourth parts of "The Day the Night Stopped Beginning to Shine and Became Dark Even Though It Was the Day"; his cover of "The Night Begins to Shine" from the special was commercially released. In 2020, Green participated as the "Monster" on the British version of The Masked Singer. In 2022, he provided the voice of Shuggie in the Disney+ series The Proud Family: Louder and Prouder.

== Other ventures ==
Managed by Primary Wave Entertainment, Green has endorsed various brands, including 7 Up, M&M's, and Duracell. Green owns part of the sake brand TYKU and the company has collaborated with him on a few business ventures, including a commercial promoting the brand, dubbed the "first national sake commercial" in the United States. In 2011, it was estimated by a New York Times reporter that Green earned some US$20 million, predominantly from the endorsement deals, in that year alone.

== Personal life ==
Green has described himself as having been a "goon" in his youth, as well as a "kleptomaniac, pyromaniac, just plain maniac".

Green was married to Christina Johnson, and they divorced in 2005. Their son, Kingston, was born on September 30, 2000, and Green was stepfather to her daughters, Sierra (born 1990) and Kalah. Sierra appeared on the MTV show My Super Sweet 16 for her 15th birthday party in 2005.

== Controversies ==
On June 16, 2011, journalist Andrea Swensson of City Pages negatively reviewed one of Green's performances, writing that it "failed to measure up to the fun factor of his recorded material. Green spent most of the set stationed in front of a microphone at the center of the stage, barely moving an inch while he sang, and flanked by two forgettable back-up singers and a DJ that was all but hidden behind a giant LCD display". In response, the following day Green tweeted, "I respect your criticism but be fair! People enjoyed last night! I'm guessing ur gay? And my masculinity offended u? well fuck U!" Green promptly received angered responses from some of his followers on Twitter, to which he replied, "Apologies gay community! what was homophobic about that?" In a subsequent interview with magazine Us Weekly, Green stated that his comments were meant in good fun, adding that "I am not harboring any sort of negative feeling toward the gay community" and that "I am one of the most liberal artists that I think you will ever meet, and I pride myself on that."

On December 31, 2011, Green sang John Lennon's "Imagine" just prior to the ball drop for New Year's Eve at New York City's Times Square. In his rendition, Green replaced the line "and no religion, too" with the words "and all religions true". Many saw this as a substantial revision of the meaning behind Lennon's original lyrics. Shortly after the performance, Green responded via Twitter: "Yo I meant no disrespect by changing the lyric guys! I was trying to say a world where u could believe what u wanted that's all". Green deleted a series of tweets pertaining to this event shortly thereafter.

On October 30, 2012, Green was accused of sexual battery by a woman with whom he had dined at a Los Angeles restaurant, leading to a nearly year-long investigation by the Los Angeles Police Department. On October 21, 2013, Green pleaded not guilty to a felony charge of furnishing a controlled substance after the Los Angeles District Attorney's Office declined to file a charge of rape of an intoxicated person, citing insufficient evidence. On August 29, 2014, Green pleaded no contest to one felony count of furnishing ecstasy and was sentenced to three years of probation, 360 hours of community service, and ordered to complete 52 Alcoholics Anonymous or Narcotics Anonymous meetings.

On August 31, 2014, Green was criticized for tweets relating to his sexual battery case, including, "People who have really been raped REMEMBER!!!," and "If someone is passed out they're not even WITH you consciously! so WITH Implies consent." After sending a number of tweets on the topic of rape, he temporarily deactivated his Twitter account. He re-activated it a number of hours later, tweeting the following apology: "I truly and deeply apologize for the comments attributed to me on Twitter. Those comments were idiotic, untrue and not what I believe."

== Discography ==
Solo albums

- Cee-Lo Green and His Perfect Imperfections (2002)
- Cee-Lo Green... Is the Soul Machine (2004)
- The Lady Killer (2010)
- Cee Lo's Magic Moment (2012)
- Heart Blanche (2015)
- CeeLo Green Is Thomas Callaway (2020)

Gnarls Barkley albums

- St. Elsewhere (2006)
- The Odd Couple (2008)
- Atlanta (2026)

Goodie Mob albums

- Soul Food (1995)
- Still Standing (1998)
- World Party (1999)
- Age Against the Machine (2013)
- Survival Kit (2020)

== Filmography ==
=== Film ===
| Year | Title | Role | Notes |
|---|---|---|---|
| 1999 | Mystery Men | Rapper | Credited as "Thomas Burton aka Cee-Lo" |
| 2010 | Freaknik: The Musical | Light Skin Juliens | Voice |
| 2012 | Hotel Transylvania | Murray | Voice |
| 2012 | Sparkle | Black | Voice |
| 2013 | Begin Again | Troublegum | Voice |

=== Television ===
| Year(s) | Title | Role | Notes |
|---|---|---|---|
| 2007 | Class of 3000 | Frank, Buddy Z | Voice: 1 episode |
| 2007 | Robot Chicken | Godzilla, Tablesmasher, Dog | Voice: 1 episode |
| 2007-2008 | The Boondocks | Reverend Rollo Goodlove | Voice: 2 episodes |
| 2011 | American Dad! | Hot Tub, Narrator | Voice: 1 episode |
| 2011–2013 | The Voice | Himself | Coach (seasons 1–3, 5); non-competing guest performer in season 4, episode 16 |
| 2014 | CeeLo Green's The Good Life | Himself | Host |
| 2017 | Teen Titans Go! | Ceelo | Voice: 3 episodes |
| 2022–2026 | The Proud Family: Louder and Prouder | Shuggie the Panda | Voice: 4 episodes |
