= Cee-Lo Green... Is the Soul Machine =

Studio album by CeeLo Green
- Released: March 2, 2004
- Recorded: 2003–2004
- Genres: Neo soul; hip-hop
- Length: 73:26
- Label: Arista
- Producers: Cee-Lo Green; Traxx; The Neptunes; Timbaland; Jazze Pha; Organized Noize; Charles Pettaway; DJ Premier; Locksmif

CeeLo Green chronology
Cee-Lo Green and His Perfect Imperfections (2002)	Cee-Lo Green... Is the Soul Machine (2004)	The Lady Killer (2010)

Singles from Cee-Lo Green... Is the Soul Machine
- 1. "I'll Be Around" Released: 2004; 2. "The One" Released: 2004

Professional ratings
Aggregate scores
Source	Rating
Metacritic	86/100
Review scores
Source	Rating
AllMusic	4/5 stars
Entertainment Weekly	B
The Guardian	4/5 stars
Los Angeles Times	3/4 stars
Mojo	5/5 stars
Pitchfork	8.3/10
Q	4/5 stars
Rolling Stone	3.5/5 stars
Spin	B+
The Village Voice	B+

Cee-Lo Green... Is the Soul Machine is the second studio album by CeeLo Green, released on March 2, 2004.

== Legacy ==
The album was included in the book 1001 Albums You Must Hear Before You Die.

== Singles ==
- "I'll Be Around" (#52) (Hot R&B/Hip-Hop Songs)
- "The One" (#82) (Hot R&B/Hip-Hop Songs)

== Track listing ==
Credits adapted from the album's liner notes.

No.	Title	Writer(s)	Producer(s)	Length
1.	"Intro"			0:23
2.	"Soul Machine"	Thomas Callaway; Chris Rogers	Traxx	1:40
3.	"The Art of Noise" (featuring Pharrell)	Pharrell Williams; Chad Hugo; Callaway; Burton Cummings; Randy Bachman	The Neptunes	3:46
4.	"Living Again"	Callaway	Cee Lo Green	3:37
5.	"I'll Be Around" (featuring Timbaland)	Callaway; Tim Mosley	Timbaland	3:41
6.	"The One" (featuring Jazze Pha and T.I.)	Callaway; Phalon Alexander; Clifford Harris; Philip Bailey; Maurice White; Carlton Ridenhour; Hank Shocklee	Jazze Pha	4:43
7.	"My Kind of People" (featuring Jazze Pha and Menta Malone)	Callaway; Donat Mittoo; Headley Bennett; Lloyd Ferguson; Leroy Sibbles; Robert Lyn; Huford Brown; Fitzroy Simpson	Cee Lo Green	3:54
8.	"Childz Play" (featuring Ludacris)	Rico Wade; Ray Murray; Patrick Brown; Callaway; Christopher Bridges	Organized Noize	3:54
9.	"I Am Selling Soul"	Callaway	Cee Lo Green	4:16
10.	"All Day Love Affair"	Callaway; Rogers	Traxx	4:12
11.	"Evening News" (featuring Chazzie and Sir Cognac The Conversation)	Callaway; Chris Martin; John Dankworth	DJ Premier	4:12
12.	"Scrap Metal" (featuring Big Rube and G-Rock)	Wade; Murray; P. Brown; Callaway; Greg Martin; Ruben Bailey	Organized Noize	4:40
13.	"Glockappella"	Callaway; James Banks; Eddie Marion; Henderson Thigpen	Cee Lo Green	5:21
14.	"When We Were Friends"	Callaway; Charles Pettaway	Cee Lo Green; Charles Pettaway	3:43
15.	"Sometimes"	Callaway; Leon Douglas II	Locsmif	5:04
16.	"Let's Stay Together" (featuring Pharrell)	Williams; Hugo; Callaway	The Neptunes	3:54
17.	"Die Trying"	Callaway	Cee Lo Green	4:05
18.	"What Don't You Do? (Outro)"			0:20

Sample credits

- "The Art of Noise" contains replayed elements from "These Eyes", written by Burton Cummings and Randy Bachman.
- "The One" contains samples from:
  - "Devotion", written by Philip Bailey and Maurice White, and performed by Earth, Wind & Fire.
  - "Public Enemy No. 1", written by Carlton Ridenhour and Hank Shocklee, and performed by Public Enemy.
- "My Kind of People" contains re-sung elements from "Pass the Dutchie", written by Donat Mittoo, Headley Bennett, Lloyd Ferguson, Leroy Sibbles, Robert Lyn, Huford Brown, and Fitzroy Simpson.
- "Evening News" contains samples from "Return from the Ashes (Theme)", written and performed by John Dankworth.
- "Glockapella" contains samples from "Holy Ghost", written by James Banks, Eddie Marion, and Henderson Thigpen, and performed by The Bar-Kays.

== Charts ==
=== Weekly charts ===
Chart (2004)	Peak position
US Billboard 200	13
US Top R&B/Hip-Hop Albums (Billboard)	2

=== Year-end charts ===
Chart (2004)	Position
US Top R&B/Hip-Hop Albums (Billboard)	80
