= Bright Lights Bigger City =

Single by CeeLo Green

from the album The Lady Killer
- Released: March 27, 2011
- Recorded: 2010
- Genre: Soul; boogie; synthpop
- Length: 3:38 (album version); 3:19 (single iTunes remix version); 3:37 (single remix version)
- Label: Elektra
- Songwriters: Thomas Callaway; Ben H. Allen III; Tony Reyes
- Producers: Ben H. Allen; Graham Marsh (co.)

CeeLo Green singles chronology
"Fool for You" (2011)	"Bright Lights Bigger City" (2011)	"I Want You (Hold Onto Love)" (2011)

Wiz Khalifa singles chronology
"On My Level" (2011)	"Bright Lights Bigger City (Remix)" (2011)	"Till I'm Gone" (2011)

"Bright Lights Bigger City" is the fourth single from American singer CeeLo Green's third studio album, The Lady Killer. The song was produced by Ben H. Allen, co-produced by Graham Marsh, and written by Cee Lo, Tony Reyes, and Allen. The single was released on March 27, 2011, topping the charts in Israel and peaking at number thirteen in the United Kingdom. A remix of the track features a guest appearance from American rapper Wiz Khalifa. The song, which is featured in the film Monte Carlo, samples "You Only Live Twice" from the James Bond film of the same name.

== Background ==
Of the song, Cee Lo told MTV News: "This song, I think, just has a broader appeal, because it's just not talking about me, it's talking about us. It's a song about the nightlife and just kinda being out and living for the weekend. It's kinda got that 'working-class hero' quality too; I reference, you know, songs like Johnny Kemp's "Just Got Paid". So it's a story that's been told before, and it's so true to life. ... We all work pretty hard throughout the week, and Friday and Saturday, you know, will always be special, so this is just a song to commemorate that." In late January 2011, Cee Lo rescheduled his UK tour dates, with the five-show run now ending on March 31, 2011. "Bright Lights Bigger City" was released four days before the tour concluded, on March 27, 2011.

== Critical reception ==
Reviews of the track were mostly favorable. Several reviews, including Rob Williams of The Winnipeg Free Press and Zachary Berman of The Diamondback Online argue "Bright Lights Bigger City" is reminiscent of Michael Jackson's "Billie Jean" due to a similar looping bassline. Williams writes, "Bright Lights Bigger City sounds like the cousin of Michael Jackson's Billie Jean"; while in Berman's analysis, "Green even goes so far as to touch on disco and early-1980s pop elements, as with "Bright Lights Bigger City," which opens the album with a bang. With a bass line that references Michael Jackson's "Billie Jean," a string section straight out of any classic disco dance tune and even a synth reminiscent of Van Halen's "Jump," the song is still a powerful, cohesive pop track." Luke Winkie of Music OMH says "the only thing that sounds inherently new on The Lady Killer is the post-intro curveball, "Bright Lights Bigger City", which combines an electro-funk groove, swirling violins and a massive rave-synth chorus. It's great, off-the-wall, and totally engaging." Not all reviews of "Bright Lights Bigger City" were overwhelmingly positive. For example, Jeremy Gartzke, writing for The Daily Cardinal, argues "Bright Lights Bigger City" is a straightforward song about the virtues of Saturday nights. With a staccato intro and a fantastic bass line, this song was written specifically with the dance floor in mind. Unfortunately, this song just isn't memorable, and as soon as it's over you've forgotten about it."

== Music video ==
The first music video for "Bright Lights Bigger City", which features the album version of the track, was released on November 9, 2010, the same date as the release of The Lady Killer in the US. In describing the video, MTV.com's Kyle Anderson reports: "The video puts Cee Lo in the back of a car, cruising through the streets of New York surrounded by glammed-out women and flower petals. In between, he seduces a woman in a bathtub, gets his head shaved in a black-lit room and gets into some sort of super-spy battle with a female ninja in a restaurant kitchen. The video reflects the posh and slightly hallucinatory nature of the track. It's emblematic of the rest of The Lady Killer, which borrows all sorts of classic Motown and Stax elements and augments them with futuristic sounds, all buoyed by Cee-Lo's remarkably elastic voice." A second version of the music video, featuring the remix featuring Wiz Khalifa, was released on March 10, 2011. Khalifa's verse begins at approximately two minutes and twenty seconds in. Drew Grant of Salon Magazine described the "neon" video as "a city populated entirely by neon signs instead of people," allowing one to "visualize all the words of the song, so it's kind of like a Sing-a-long!" The remix video has been compared to Cee Lo's original video for "Fuck You" and other videos that feature a visualization of the song's lyrics.

== Live performances ==
Green is touring with an all-female backing band named Scarlet Fever, performing this song on November 11, 2010, as part of the Symmetry Live Concert Series at the W Hotel in Midtown Manhattan, New York, and the January 15, 2011, episode of Saturday Night Live. The performance received positive reviews, being described as "rock-star-esque", "surprisingly good", "the best song that mid-80’s Glenn Frey never wrote," and "better than all right". They performed the song opening for Prince at Madison Square Garden, the Shockwaves NME Awards Big Gig opening for Foo Fighters at Wembley Arena, and the charity Let's Dance for Comic Relief semi-final in London, England, again the next night after a long flight at the Jimmy Kimmel Live! special show following the Academy Awards, and many other venues. Green performed the song live on August 14, 2011, at WWE SummerSlam which used the song as its official theme song. He performed the song live with Daryl Hall on Hall's series Live from Daryl's House.

== Track listing ==
Digital Download

1. "Bright Lights Bigger City" (feat. Wiz Khalifa) - 3:19
2. "Bright Lights Bigger City" (The Shapeshifters Heavy Disco Remix) - 6:43

UK Promotional CD Single Set / German CD Single

1. "Bright Lights Bigger City" - 3:41
2. "Bright Lights Bigger City" (feat. Wiz Khalifa) - 3:37

== Personnel ==
- Arrangement (strings) - Salaam Remi
- Songwriting - Ben H. Allen III, Cee-Lo Green, Tony Reyes
- Production - Ben H. Allen, Graham Marsh (co-producer)
- Recording - Ben H. Allen, Graham Marsh
- Mixing - Ben H. Allen, Robert Gardner (Assistant)
- Bass - Tony Reyes
- Drums - Bradley Hagen

== Charts ==
=== Weekly charts ===
Chart (2011)	Peak position
Belgium (Ultratop 50 Flanders)	34
Canada Hot 100 (Billboard)	83
Germany (GfK)	54
Hungary (Rádiós Top 40)	6
Ireland (IRMA)	36
Israel International Airplay (Media Forest)	1
Netherlands (Dutch Top 40)	24
Netherlands (Single Top 100)	23
New Zealand (Recorded Music NZ)	9
Scottish Singles Sales (Official Charts)	16
UK Singles (Official Charts)	13
UK Hip Hop/R&B (Official Charts)	5
US Bubbling Under Hot 100 (Billboard)	2
US Adult Pop Airplay (Billboard)	39
US Pop Airplay (Billboard)	36

=== Year-end charts ===
Chart (2011)	Position
Hungary (Rádiós Top 40)	54
UK Singles (OCC)	103

== Certifications ==
Region	Certification	Certified units/sales
New Zealand (RMNZ)	Gold	7,500^{*}
United Kingdom (BPI)	Silver	200,000^{^}
^{*} Sales figures based on certification alone.^{^} Shipments figures based on certification alone.

== Release history ==
Region	Date	Format	Label
United Kingdom	March 27, 2011	Digital download, CD single	Elektra
Germany	May 20, 2011	CD single	Elektra
