= Graham Marsh (producer) =

American music producer

- Origin: Georgia, U.S.
- Genres: Pop, rock, blues, soul, urban, R&B, hip hop, funk
- Occupation(s): Producer, mixer, writer, engineer, multi-instrumentalist
- Years active: 2005–present
- Member of: CLAVVS, dayaway
- Website: grahammarshmusic.com

Graham N. Marsh (born September 27, 1979) is an American record producer, recording engineer and multi-instrumentalist from Georgia. He has helped produce four Grammy Award-winning albums from sixteen nominations. He is also half of the Brooklyn indie pop duos CLAVVS and dayaway with singer-songwriter Amber Renee. Marsh began releasing songs from his instrumental project Draigh in early 2019.

== Career ==
Marsh is a graduate of Full Sail University's Recording Arts program. He started his career in Atlanta working at Jermaine Dupri's "Southside Studios" for So So Def Recordings where he worked with Janet Jackson, Mariah Carey, Nelly and Bryan-Michael Cox. While at Southside Studios, Marsh met Dallas Austin's engineer/programmer, Rick Sheppard and was hired to work at Dallas' DARP Studios. Marsh worked at DARP as an assistant to Dallas and Sheppard, engineering recordings for Natalie Cole, George Clinton, Joss Stone, Sugababes and Lionel Richie.

Marsh steadily became in very heavy demand as more people became aware of his amazing talents as an engineer. He has engineered, produced and given his multi-instrumentalist talents to a very long list of well known megastars including Asher Roth, Fantasia, Leona Lewis, Estelle, Nas, Travie McCoy, The Constellations, Plies, Ciara, Amerie, Juvenile, Ludacris, "Rick Ross", Common, Novel, Kelis, Kid Cudi, Chase & Status, The Teddybears, and Bruno Mars. In recognition of his engineering talents Marsh was nominated for "Outstanding Creative Achievement" at the 27th annual TEC Awards.

Marsh met CeeLo Green at one of his freelancing jobs which proved to be a Grammy winning union. Marsh and CeeLo Green formed the production team The Grey Area to work on music that would be mainstream hits. He collaborated on Gnarls Barkley's The Odd Couple and CeeLo's 2010 multi-platinum smash "Fuck You" from The Lady Killer album. The result of this collaboration was Graham receiving two Grammy nominations, with one win for Best Urban/Alternative Performance for the song "Fuck You".

Marsh met Amber Renee in summer of 2013, and the pair started writing songs together under the name CLAWS (eventually changed to CLAVVS). They released their first singles in 2015. CLAVVS' music has been featured on the CW's Charmed and MTV's Teen Wolf. They have earned praise from NPR, The Line of Best Fit, and Consequence of Sound, among others.

== Grammy Awards ==
Graham Marsh has won four Grammy Awards from sixteen nominations.

Year	Awardee	Category	Result
2007	Ludacris "Release Therapy"	Best Rap Album	Won
2009	Gnarls Barkley "The Odd Couple"	Best Alternative Music Album	Nominated
2009	Gnarls Barkley "Going On"	Best Pop Performance by a Duo or Group with Vocal	Nominated
2010	CeeLo Green "F**k You"	Best Urban/Alternative Performance	Won
2010	CeeLo Green "F**k You"	Record of the Year	Nominated
2010	CeeLo Green "F**k You"	Song of the Year	Nominated
2010	Common "Universal Mind Control"	Best Rap Album	Nominated
2010	Fantasia Back to Me	Best R&B Album	Nominated
2011	The Twilight Saga: Eclipse (soundtrack)	Grammy Award for Best Compilation Soundtrack for Visual Media	Nominated
2012	Bruno Mars Doo-Wops & Hooligans	Best Pop Vocal Album	Nominated
2012	CeeLo Green Lady Killer	Best Pop Vocal Album	Nominated
2012	Bruno Mars Doo-Wops & Hooligans	Album of the Year	Nominated
2012	Bruno Mars Doo-Wops & Hooligans	Record of the Year	Nominated
2012	Bruno Mars "Grenade"	Best Pop Solo Performance	Nominated
2012	CeeLo Green "Fool For You"	Best Traditional R&B Performance	Won
2012	CeeLo Green "Fool For You"	Grammy Award for Best R&B Song	Won

== Discography ==
- Sugababes – Taller in More Ways (2005)
- Sugababes – Push The Button (2005)
- Lionel Richie – Coming Home (2006)
- Da BackWudz – Wood Work (2006)
- Stacie Orrico – Beautiful Awakening (2006)
- Natalie Cole – Leavin (2006)
- Leona Lewis – Spirit (2007)
- Ludacris – Release Therapy (2007)
- Elliott Yamin – Sounds of the Season: The Elliott Yamin Holiday Collection (2007)
- Elliott Yamin – My Kind of Holiday (2008)
- Kung Fu Panda Original Motion Picture Soundtrack (2008)
- Estelle – Shine (2008)
- Amerie – In Love & War (2009)
- Asher Roth – Asleep in the Bread Aisle (2009)
- SpongeBob's Greatest Hits (2009)
- Kate Earl – Kate Earl (2009)
- The Falcon Lords - Straight From the Center of Their Volcano Lair (2010)
- CeeLo Green – The Lady Killer (2010)
- CeeLo Green – F**k You (2010)
- Bruno Mars – It's Better If You Don't Understand (2010)
- Bruno Mars – Doo-Wops & Hooligans (2010)
- Sex and the City 2 – Original Motion Picture Soundtrack (2010)
- Rick Ross – Teflon Don (2010)
- Fantasia Barrino – Back to Me (2010)
- Common – Universal Mind Control (2010)
- Rave On Buddy Holly (2011)
- The Twilight Saga: Eclipse (2011)
- CeeLo Green – Stray Bullets: The Mixtape Made Of Gold (2011)
- CeeLo Green – Bright Lights Bigger City (2011)
- "Footloose 2011 Soundtrack" (2011)
- Cobra Starship Night Shades (2011)
- Sparkle Original Motion Picture Soundtrack (2012)
- Why? (American band) - "Mumps, etc." (2012)
- Cisilia - Ring Den Alarm (2015)
- CLAWS – Feel It All (2015)
- Como Brothers Band – Imagination (2015)
- Lauryn Hill - Nina Revisited: A Tribute to Nina Simone (2015)
- CLAVVS - halfblood (2016)
- Empty Houses - Daydream (2016)
- CLAVVS - World Underwater (2017)
- CLAVVS - No Saviors EP (2019)
- Draigh - Palm single (2019)
