= Only in Dreams =

Only in Dreams may refer to:

- "Only in Dreams" (song), a 1994 song by Weezer
- Only in Dreams (Dum Dum Girls album), 2011
- "Only in Dreams", a song by Kate Earl, from her 2009 self-titled album
- Only in Dreams (Delta Heavy album), 2019
- Only in dreams, a Japanese record label founded by Masafumi Gotoh
- Only in Dreams, a comics series produced by Still Playing with Toys
