= It's OK (CeeLo Green song) =

Single by CeeLo Green

from the album The Lady Killer
- Released: December 27, 2010
- Recorded: 2010
- Genre: Soul
- Length: 3:46
- Label: Elektra
- Songwriters: Cee Lo Green; Noel Fisher; Hitesh Ceon; Kim Ofstad
- Producer: Element

CeeLo Green singles chronology
"Fuck You!" (2010)	"It's OK" (2010)	"Fool for You" (2011)

"It's OK" is the second single from American soul singer CeeLo Green's third studio album, The Lady Killer. The song is produced by Element, and written by Cee Lo, Element and Noel Fisher. The single was released on December 27, 2010, and peaked at number 20 on the UK Singles Chart. In the UK the single made BBC Radio 1's A-Playlist (which is argued to be its "most influential playlist").

== Background ==
Unlike the first single from the album, "It's OK" was exclusively released in the UK and certain areas of Europe. The song received its first recognition on the British charts following the video premiering on 4 Music on December 9, 2010. The single was released on two formats only: the physical release, which features the main album version and the Paul Epworth remix of the title track; and the digital release, which includes two remixes of the title track, exclusive B-Side "Bridges" and a live recording of "Radioactive" taken from the Radio 1 Live Lounge Sessions.

== Critical reception ==
In the context of The Lady Killer, the song was positively reviewed. David Carr for Chicks With Guns (CWG) Magazine says, "On the more up tempo numbers [on The Lady Killer], "Cry Baby, [and] It's OK", you may feel as if you are watching reruns of the 70's TV show Love American Style as Cee Lo creates some great lyrical vignettes to go with his amazingly versatile voice. Don't even think of asking if the man uses auto-tune because the answer is a resounding no!" Leah Greenblatt for Entertainment Weekly says, "[It's OK] honors and tweaks the tropes of vintage songcraft with hefty doses of sweet Motown/Stax boogie." Andy Gill for The Belfast Telegraph argues, "when [Green] pushes the Motown buttons again, as in "Cry Baby", and "It's OK", it's done with such panache and wit that staleness never becomes an issue: rather than just footnotes to the source inspiration, these are fully rounded artworks in their own right." Colin Somerville of Scotland on Sunday describes It's OK as a "luxuriant stomp" with a "Northern Soul" influence, and lists it in his tracks to download from The Lady Killer.

Not all reviews of "It's OK" were positive, however. Robin Murray for Clash Magazine (reviewing It's OK as a single release) opines, "blessed with an undoubtedly pleasant voice, it’s a shame that Cee Lo Green uses it on such undramatic material. Sure, ‘Forget You’ had its cheeky charm but you can't help but feel that Cee Lo could do so much more. ‘It’s OK’ is another pleasant, melodic single which will be adopted by the nation but the middle of the road is such a boring way to travel."

== Commercial performance ==
After its December 27, 2010 release, "It's OK" entered the UK Singles Chart at No. 44, and in its fourth week rose to No. 24. In its fifth week on the UK Singles Chart, the song peaked at No. 20. In the subsequent week, the song dropped to No. 33. The song entered the UK R&B charts at No. 54 a week before its release, and upon its release it climbed to No. 20. The song rose to No. 17 in its second week, No. 14 in its third week, and subsequently peaked at No. 6 in its fourth week. The song peaked at No. 94 on the Dutch charts. Entering at No. 30, "It's OK" eventually peaked at No. 17 on the Belgian airplay chart. In its fourth week on the Scottish Charts, the song rose to No. 23 from its previous week's position at No. 43. In its fifth week on the Scottish Charts the song peaked at No. 19, and fell to No. 36 in its subsequent week. The song did not chart in the United States.

== Music video ==
The music video for "It's OK" was released to YouTube on December 2, 2010, and features Solange Knowles. Gil Kaufman published this summary of the video for MTV.com:

Cee Lo makes his way down a neon-lit city street in the clip as he tries to woo three very different lovely ladies. Like the viral-bomb video for his Grammy bait "Fuck You!", the new one mixes live-action footage with stylized, cartoony graphics spotlighting the singer's name, the song title and key lyric phrases, while adding a picture-frame device that highlights the three objects of his affection. Looking dapper in a pin-striped tuxedo with oversized black bowtie, Cee Lo checks his look as the clip unfolds, while the women dance in their candy-colored outfits. One looks demure in a long, flowing blue gown, another hip and fun in a short yellow shirt dress and matching tights and the third sexy in a tight red minidress. Standing next to hand-drawn images of their fingers snapping along to the song's Motown bounce, Cee Lo starts making his way down the street mooning about a girlfriend whose perfume he can still smell on his sheets, but who has abandoned him. As he reminds her that "It's OK to say that you love me/ I think of you, still thinking of you," Cee sits in a chair while his yellow-dress beauty shows him some of her sexiest dance moves. By the time he gets to his "legendary" blue-dress lady, Green is ready to put a tiara on his queen and waltz her around the room while the song's lyrics are scrawled across the screen. He breaks into his crooner mode for the lady in red, who emerges from a bathtub filled with roses in lingerie to share a drink with the singer on the couch. The ladies — who also served as his backup singers in the "Fuck You!" clip — then dance behind Cee Lo as he sings the song's chorus with an evening skyline behind him. Combined with the earlier video, Green is clearly going for a consistent theme in his Lady Killer promo pieces, reaching back for a classic look and performance-oriented feel that fits with the album's elegant, soul-throwback sound.

== Live performances ==
Cee Lo is touring with an all-female backing band named Scarlet Fever, performing this song on November 11, 2010, as part of the Symmetry Live Concert Series at the W Hotel in Midtown Manhattan, New York, February 25, 2011, for Shockwaves NME Awards Big Gig opening for Foo Fighters at Wembley Arena, and throughout their 2011 concert tours. Cee Lo also appeared on the latest series of Alan Carr: Chatty Man to promote the single.

== Track listing ==
Digital Download

1. "It's OK" (Album Version) - 3:46
2. "It's OK" (Paul Epworth Version) - 3:31
3. "It's OK" (Michael Gray Remix) - 7:06
4. "Bridges" (Produced By The Neptunes)
5. "Radioactive" (BBC Live Version) - 3:24

Promotional CD Single

1. "It's OK" (Paul Epworth Version) - 3:31
2. "It's OK" (Album Version) - 3:46

== Personnel ==
- Songwriting - Cee Lo Green, Hitesh Ceon, Kim Ofstad, Noel Fisher
- Recording - [At Elementary Studios, Oslo, Norway] - Hitesh, Kim
- Recording [At Pre Productions Studios] - Mark Rankin
- Production - Element*
- Production (co-production) - Paul Epworth
- Engineering - [Engineered At Metropolis Studios, London, England] - Dan Parry*
- Management [Element] - Danny D, Tim Blacksmith
- Mixing - Tom Elmhirst
- Backing Vocals - Philip Lawrence*
- Performers [instruments] - Hitesh Ceon, Jacob Lutrell, Jerry Wonder, Kim Ofstad, Mike Caren, Nikolaj Torp Larsen, Paul Epworth

== Charts ==
Chart (2011)	Peak position
Belgium (Ultratip Bubbling Under Flanders)	4
Belgium (Ultratip Bubbling Under Wallonia)	11
Hungary (Rádiós Top 40)	6
Ireland (IRMA)	31
Netherlands (Single Top 100)	94
Scottish Singles Sales (Official Charts)	19
UK Singles (Official Charts)	20
UK Hip Hop/R&B (Official Charts)	6

== Release history ==
Region	Date	Format	Label
United Kingdom	December 27, 2010	CD single, digital download	Elektra
