= Brittany Brooks =

American drummer

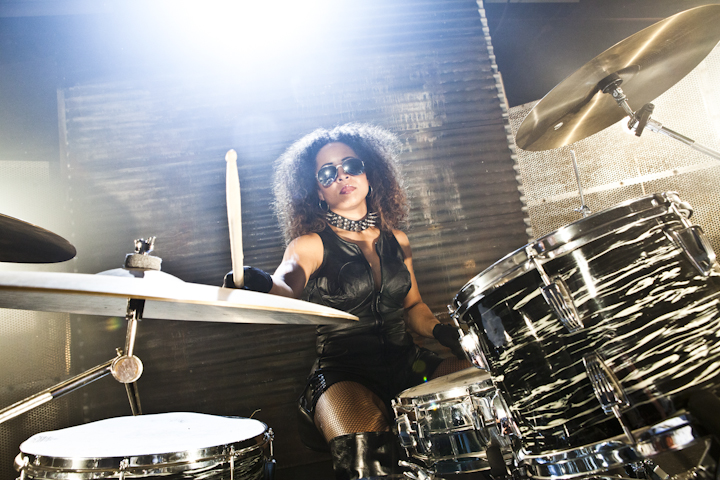

Background information
- Born: Brittany Ann Brooks; August 5, 1985 (age 40); Oakland, California
- Origin: Los Angeles, California, United States (formerly Pittsburg, California)
- Genres: Swing, soul, rock, R&B, jazz, funk
- Occupation: instrumentalist
- Instrument: drums
- Years active: 2007–present
- Website: brittanyabrooks.com

Brittany Brooks (born August 5, 1985) is an American instrumentalist. She played drums with Scarlet Fever, the all-female backing band that toured with Cee Lo Green during 2010 and 2011. She and varying members of Scarlet Fever have performed with other front women as In 4D, No Salt, and Miss President.

She also toured around the world with Kelis during June 2012, performing in Bali, Jakarta, Singapore, Russia, and the Isle of Wight. She is a founding member of the group DDMC (DJ, Drummer, and MC) with DJ K-la Vie and Liberty Jayne.

== Biography ==
Brittany Brooks was born in Oakland, California, and raised in nearby Pittsburg, California. She graduated from Pittsburg High School in 2004, where she had played snare drum with the marching band in parades at Walt Disney World and Universal Studios Florida. After moving to Los Angeles in 2006, Brooks graduated in 2007 from the Musicians Institute located in Hollywood, where she performed in television advertisements for the Institute on BET. She also attended and worked at California State University, Northridge.

=== Early years ===
Brooks began playing drums at the age of 12, following her older brother Chad who started playing the trombone two years earlier. She has played with various cover bands such as BandShe, and up and coming artists including Afrosparks, Scotty G. and the Get Down, Raz B (formerly of B2K), CrazeDotCom, Haile Selassie, and Filipina rapper Liberty Jayne.

=== Influences ===
She was originally instructed by her mentor, Angel Carrillo, at her church. She was further inspired by Sheila E to become a professional musician.

=== Scarlet Fever ===
Beginning in June 2010, she toured with Cee Lo Green and the all-female backing band named Scarlet Fever on promotional tours for "What Part of Forever" (from The Twilight Saga: Eclipse soundtrack) and The Lady Killer album. They performed for The Tonight Show with Jay Leno, BBC Radio, Late Show with David Letterman, Saturday Night Live, and many other venues. Core band members include Sharon Aguilar (lead guitar, violin), DANiiVORY née Theresa Flaminio (keyboards, background vocals), and Regina Zernay Roberts (bass guitar, Moog synthesizer).

Members of the band continued to play together in various combinations (sometimes under other band names). Aguilar, Brooks, and DANiiVORY performed with front woman Sammy Allen at Whisky a Go Go in April 2012, where Cee Lo joined them on stage.

=== Miss President ===
Aguilar, Brooks, and DANiiVORY have performed with Goldielox née Brittany Burton as In 4D, and debuted as Miss President at Whisky a Go Go on February 10, 2013. Their music encompasses "standard pop riffs, to neo-classical, and everything in-between." The band name was chosen as "empowering" for women, "... we can create great music just as guys do. We can do everything they do, and even better."
