= Sharon Aguilar =

Musician

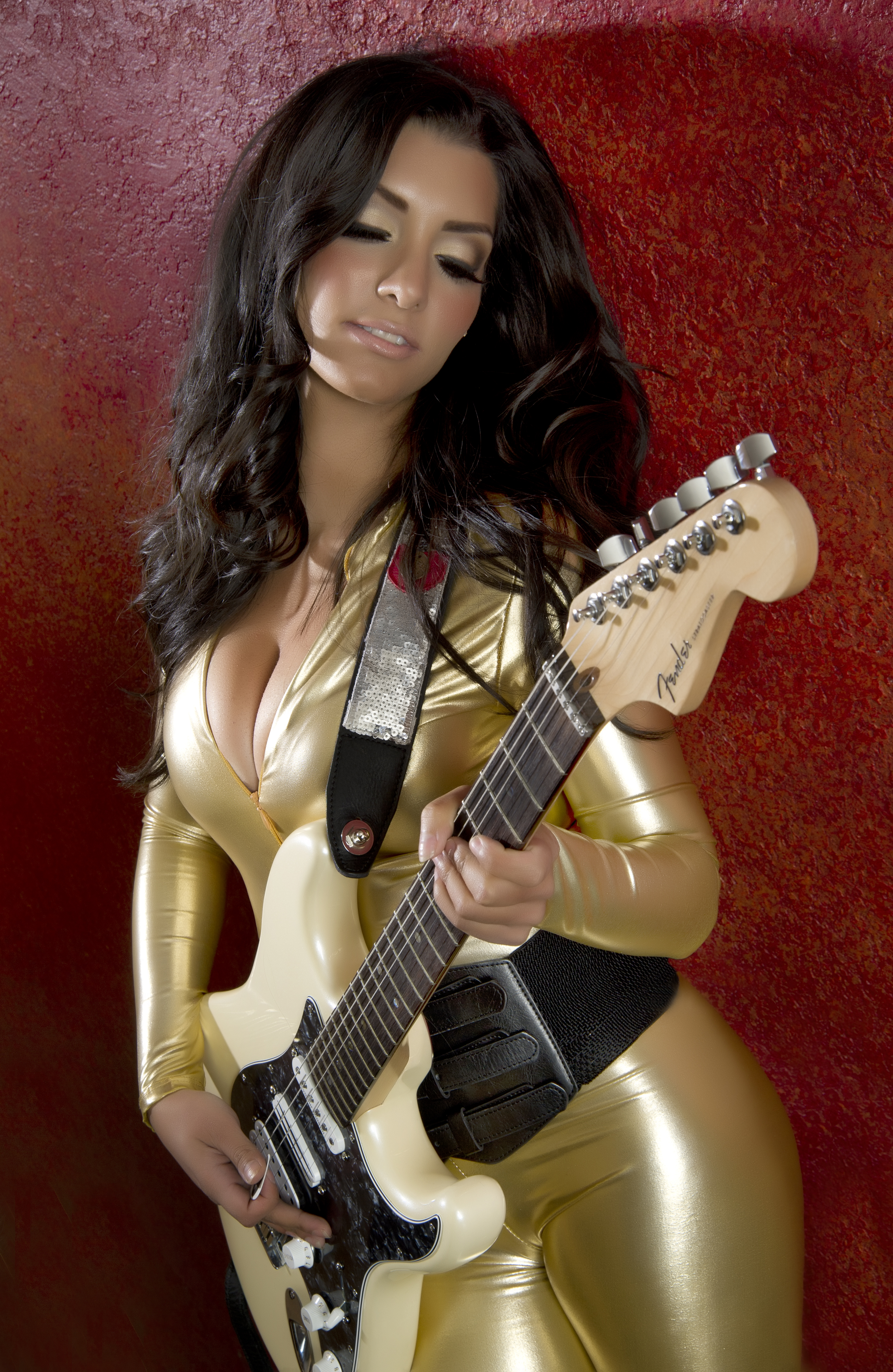

Background information
- Born: Sharon Isabel Borrego; 1986 (age 39–40); Panama
- Genres: Pop rock; rock; Funk
- Occupation: Musician
- Instruments: Guitar; violin; mandolin
- Years active: 2008–present
- Member of: Scarlet Fever
- Award: 1 Grammy nomination
- Website: facebook.com/SharonAguilarRocks

Sharon Isabel Aguilar (born 1986) is an American multi-instrumentalist, singer, and songwriter, and entrepreneur. In 2025, she received a nomination at the 67th Annual Grammy Awards for Best Children's Music Album for the album Solid Rock Revival. She toured with 2NE1 in 2012, and has both founded and performed with several other groups.

She played lead guitar and violin with Scarlet Fever, the all-female backing band that toured with Cee Lo Green during 2010 and 2011. She and varying members of Scarlet Fever have performed with other front women as in 4D, No Salt, and Miss President.

In addition to her music career, Aguilar is an entrepreneur and co-owner of the restaurant and music venue 31 Supper Club in Ormond Beach, Florida.

== Awards and nominations ==
- 2025 – Nominated for Grammy Award for Best Children's Music Album at the 67th Annual Grammy Awards for Solid Rock Revival.

== Biography ==
Sharon Aguilar was born in Panama, and raised in Miami, Florida. Her mother, Delia Aguilar-Borrego, was from Penonomé, Coclé, Panama. Her father, Richard Borrego, was an American serving there in the military. Earlier performance credits, and occasional recent credits, are under the surname of Borrego.

As a teenager, she attended a magnet school music program. She also attended school in Panama, living with relatives without amenities such as hot running water, refrigeration, and air conditioning.

In 2010, she attended and worked at the Musicians Institute located in Hollywood, California.

=== Early years ===
Aguilar began playing violin at the age of 12, and played first violin with the Dade County Honors Orchestra, and the Greater Miami Youth Symphony. She taught herself guitar and mandolin during high school. She has performed in Miami at open mic venues with her sister Kristen Borrego (bass guitarist), Erika Coromina, and others.

=== Influences ===
When she started playing guitar, Aguilar gravitated toward the classic rock her father listened to at home. A family video shows her headbanging to Led Zeppelin's "In My Time of Dying" in her playpen. She went with her father to see The Guess Who for her first concert as a teenager. Her father showed the film The Song Remains the Same, and she was inspired by watching Jimmy Page to become a professional guitarist.

Later role models include Pink Floyd's David Gilmour, "because of the way he bends his notes. I can feel them in my chest and they just really move me."

=== Breakout success ===
After moving in late 2007 to Los Angeles, California, Aguilar performed with several bands: Bad Apple, The Bitchfits (all girls tribute to the Misfits), The Ramonas (all girls tribute to the Ramones), and Pretty Little Problem.

Her national television debut playing a Fender electric violin backed Diddy's Dirty Money on Hello Good Morning for the March 31, 2010, American Idol.

Aguilar also played lead guitar with Suede (of Austin, Texas) on "You Shook Me All Night Long" opening the January 29, 2011, George Lopez comedy tour in Phoenix, Arizona. Lopez donated proceeds from this concert to the Mexican American Legal Defense and Education Fund (MALDEF).

=== Scarlet Fever ===
Beginning in June 2010, she toured with Cee Lo Green and the all-female backing band named Scarlet Fever on promotional tours for "What Part of Forever" (from The Twilight Saga: Eclipse soundtrack) and The Lady Killer album. They performed for The Tonight Show with Jay Leno, BBC Radio, Late Show with David Letterman, Saturday Night Live, and many other venues. Core band members include Brittany Brooks (drums), DANiiVORY née Theresa Flaminio (keyboards, background vocals), and Regina Zernay Roberts (bass guitar, Moog synthesizer).

Members of the band continued to play together in various combinations (sometimes under other band names). Aguilar, Brooks, and DANiiVORY performed with front woman Sammy Allen at Whisky a Go Go in April 2012, where Cee Lo joined them on stage.

=== 2NE1 ===
Aguilar, DANiiVORY, and Divinity Roxx backed 2NE1 on their New Evolution World Tour in 9 cities among 5 countries during 2012. Their performance at the Prudential Center in Newark, New Jersey, was ranked by The New York Times critics among the best concerts of the year. The concert at the Nokia Theatre in Los Angeles ranked No. 29 on Billboard's Current Box Score, the first K-Pop girl group to make this rank.

=== Miss President ===
Aguilar, Brooks, and DANiiVORY have performed with Goldielox née Brittany Burton as in 4D, and debuted as Miss President at Whisky a Go Go on February 10, 2013. Their music encompasses "standard pop riffs, to neo-classical, and everything in-between." The band name was chosen as "empowering" for women, "... we can create great music just as guys do. We can do everything they do, and even better."

== Discography ==
=== Compositions ===
- Rockstar – originally Popstar – co-written with Ashlee Williss and Britt Burton of Pretty Little Problem. Played on Hellcats during the pilot episode "A World Full of Strangers", and released on the iTunes Deluxe Edition of Fefe Dobson's album Joy. Also featured on reality television shows Snog Marry Avoid? and American Idol.

Aguilar has made lesson contributions to websites such as Guitar Tricks, as well.

== Endorsements ==
Although a young musician, Aguilar has garnered endorsements with Fender, RainSong Graphite Guitars, ENGL amps, In Tune guitar picks, and Ernie Ball strings.
