= Cry Baby (Cee Lo Green song) =

Single by Cee Lo Green

from the album The Lady Killer
- Released: October 10, 2011
- Recorded: 2010
- Genre: Soul
- Length: 3:44
- Label: Elektra
- Songwriters: Thomas Callaway; Rick Nowels
- Producer: Fraser T Smith

Cee Lo Green singles chronology
"I Want You (Hold on to Love)" (2011)	"Cry Baby" (2011)	"Anyway" (2011)

"Cry Baby" is the sixth official single from American soul singer Cee Lo Green's third studio album, The Lady Killer. The single was released via digital download and promotional CD single on October 10, 2011. The single version of the track is a slightly different remix of the track, featuring a slightly faster beat and tempo. The music video for the song was premiered on August 8, 2011, through Cee Lo Green's official YouTube channel. The single has so far peaked at No. 58 on the UK Singles Chart due to strong downloads from The Lady Killer.

== Live performances ==
Green has performed the song live several times, including appearances on The Jonathan Ross Show on October 1, 2011, and BBC Radio 1's Live Lounge on October 4. He was expected to perform the song live during the live finals of The X Factor on October 9, 2011, but instead sang a medley of "Satisfied" and "Forget You".

== Music video ==
The music video features Jaleel White performing as Cee-Lo Green, as Green was unavailable for filming at the time. The video features White leaving his girlfriend (Tanya Chisholm), and claiming to feel like the bad guy for doing so. He is subsequently surrounded by a group of people in the street, who begin dancing alongside him and performing the song.

== Track listing ==
UK Promotional CD Single

1. "Cry Baby" (Single Version) – 3:44
2. "Cry Baby" (Instrumental) – 3:44

== Credits and personnel ==
- Lead vocals – Cee Lo Green
- Producers – Fraser T Smith
- Lyrics – Callaway, Fraser T Smith, Rick Nowels
- Label: Elektra Records

Drums – John Wicks

== Charts ==
Chart (2011)	Peak position
Hungary (Rádiós Top 40)	27
Scottish Singles Sales (Official Charts)	58
UK Hip Hop/R&B (Official Charts)	17
UK Singles (The Official Charts Company)	58

== Release history ==
Region	Date	Format	Label
United Kingdom	October 10, 2011	Digital Download, CD single	Elektra
