= CLAVVS =

American indie pop duo

- Origin: Atlanta, Georgia, United States
- Genres: indie pop, synthpop, vapor soul
- Years active: 2013–present
- Label: Turn To Wind
- Members: Amber Renee; Graham Marsh
- Website: www.clavvs.com

CLAVVS (pronounced "claws") is an independent Brooklyn-based synth pop duo originally formed in Atlanta, Georgia.

== History ==
=== 2016–2017: halfblood and World Underwater ===
CLAVVS released the first singles from their debut EP halfblood on a monthly basis before its release on April 4, 2016. "Sit You Down" was picked up by several Hype Machine blogs and was also featured on PBS' international series The Music Voyager. With each monthly release, CLAVVS gained more attention, ultimately landing their single "Spectre" in MTV's Teen Wolf. CLAVVS was named Best Progressive Pop Act by Creative Loafing, who also ranked halfblood the #17 Atlanta album of 2016.

CLAVVS released their sophomore album World Underwater on March 24, 2017. World Underwater peaked at #60 on the NACC college radio chart, garnering spins at stations across the country, including Austin's KVRX and L.A.'s KCRW. Several songs from World Underwater were featured in episodes of MTV's Teen Mom: Young and Pregnant. They released a standalone cover of MGMT's "Electric Feel" on June 19 via Earmilk. A second standalone single "Like Daggers" was premiered with Ladygunn on November 13, 2017.

=== 2018-2020: No Saviors ===
In September 2018, the duo released single "Lay Back" which reached #1 on the Hype Machine chart. CLAVVS released two more singles at the end of 2018, "Slow Dive" and "Echo." "Slow Dive" and "Lay Back" were both featured in Netflix's You (Season 2). "Devils I Know" debuted on November 18, 2018 during episode six of the CW's Charmed reboot. In early 2019, CLAVVS announced that the singles would be part of their EP No Saviors which was released on March 22, 2019. Songs from the EP have been featured on Younger (TV series) and ABC's Grand Hotel (TV series), and Netflix's Locke & Key (TV series). On July 17, 2019 CLAVVS released a double single Keeps / Fade. The 405 premiered lead single "Keeps," describing it as "equal parts poignant and euphoric." "Keeps" was featured on episode 31 of MTV's Catfish: The TV Show, which aired on June 26, 2019. CLAVVS released No Saviors (Extended) on February 25, 2020 alongside a video for featured single "Half Moon" which premiered via KCRW on February 20, 2020.

=== 2020 - 2021: O ===
CLAVVS premiered a video for new single "Dance in Place" with Under the Radar (magazine) on Monday, October 12, 2020 ahead of the full release on Tuesday, October 13, 2020. Under the Radar described the song and video as "infectious [and] joyous." In November 2020, CLAVVS followed up with a second single and video for "Heyi."

On July 29, 2021 CLAVVS released their sophomore album O, which included 2020 singles "Dance in Place" and "Heyi" as well as 2021 single "Stay Forever". "Dance in Place" is featured in the season finale of Mindy Kaling's HBO series The Sex Lives of College Girls. CLAVVS released the O remixes on November 19, 2021, featuring tracks by WHY?'s Yoni Wolf, Treasure Fingers, and Marsh's electronic solo project draigh.

=== 2022 - Present ===
In October 2023, CLAVVS released the stand alone single "Interference". The track was followed up by an official remix by Treasure Fingers, which released on November 30, 2023. Shortly after, CLAVVS released "Get Down" on December 21, 2023. The track was a collaboration with Chico Mann of Antibalas and was featured in a Michael Kors ad campaign. On January 31 of 2024, the band released the single "House on Fire".

CLAVVS released a collaborative EP titled A Dream Away with Graham Marsh's solo project, draigh on December 12, 2024. It featured the songs "Daydream", "Radio", "Clouds", and "It's Coming Back Around".

== Sound ==
CLAVVS' sound combines elements of world music and electronica with indie dance and vapor soul. The 405 describes CLAVVS as "indie hitmakers" for their use of pop and indie elements. Consequence of Sound praises the duo's "natural chemistry," calling their sound "swirling and wistful." NPR calls CLAVVS "sleek and suitably mysterious...a pop sound that straddles spacey trip-hop and ingratiating pop, with notes of psychedelia to keep the mix feeling ever-so-slightly off balance." Pop Matters says, "Since their inception, the duo have carved a niche for themselves with richly-produced, hook-laden indie pop."

== Members ==
- Graham Marsh – instrumentals, production
- Amber Renee – lyrics, vocals

== Discography ==
=== Albums & EPs ===
- Feel It All (2015)
- Halfblood EP (2016)
- Halfblood (2016)
- World Underwater (2017)
- No Saviors EP (2019)
- Half Moon EP (2020)
- No Saviors (Extended version) (2020)
- O (2021)
- A Dream Away EP collaboration with draigh (2024)

=== Standalone Singles ===
- "Electric Feel" (June 2017)
- "Like Daggers" (November 2017)
- "Rather Be Home" (October 2020)
- "The Killing Moon (Echo and The Bunnymen Cover)" (October 2020)
- "Interference" (October 2023)
- "Get Down" (December 2023)
- "House on Fire" (January 2024)

=== Remixes ===
- "Sit You Down" Bombassic Remix (2016)
- "Serpentine" Daily Bread Remix (2017)
- "Lay Back" Bad Tuner Remix (2019)
- "Dance in Place" Treasure Fingers Remix (2021)
- "Dance in Place" Treasure Fingers Dub Remix (2021)
- "Heyi" Yoni Wolf Remix (2021)
- "Put it Down" draigh Remix (2021)
- "Interference" Treasure Fingers Remix (2023)

== Live performances ==
CLAVVS has performed with Ibeyi, Kevin Garrett (musician), and Vampire Weekend's Chris Baio, among others. The duo performed at Sweetwater 420 Fest in 2017 following a tour of the United States' East Coast from Atlanta to Brooklyn. CLAVVS opened for Kevin Garrett (musician) during Canadian Music Week in Toronto, Ontario in 2019 as well as The Underground Music Showcase in Denver, CO the same year. CLAVVS made their SXSW debut in 2019, where they were named one of NPR's Austin 100 Artists to Watch. The duo played their debut LA show on March 17, 2019 at The Echo (venue), followed by a No Saviors EP release show on March 29, 2019 at Knitting Factory in Brooklyn, NY. CLAVVS played one show in 2020 opening for Siames at Gramercy Theater in Manhattan, NY. In 2021, the duo played their O album release show at Our Wicked Lady in Bushwick, NY ahead of a Sultan Room headline show later that year.
