= Fool for You =

Single by CeeLo Green featuring Melanie Fiona

from the album The Lady Killer
- Released: March 8, 2011
- Recorded: 2010
- Genre: Soul
- Length: 3:45
- Label: Elektra
- Songwriters: Thomas Calloway; Jack Splash
- Producer: Jack Splash

CeeLo Green singles chronology
| "It's OK" (2010) | "Fool for You" (2011) | "Bright Lights Bigger City" (2011) |

"Fool for You" is a song by American soul singer CeeLo Green from his third studio album, The Lady Killer. The song was solicited to radio as the album's third single on March 8, 2011. The single version of the track features guest vocals from Canadian singer Melanie Fiona; the album version, however, features vocals from American singer Philip Bailey. No music video was released for the song.

At the 54th Grammy Awards, "Fool for You" won in two categories: Best Traditional R&B Performance and Best R&B Song.

== Background ==
Green first premiered the new version of "Fool for You", featuring vocals from Fiona, by making it available as a free download via his official Facebook page. The song was released as a digital download and a CD single, with both releases featuring the song "Bridges", previously only available as an Amazon MP3 digital download. A demo was originally done by Jamie Foxx for his album Best Night of My Life but was given to Cee-Lo instead.

== Critical reception ==
Joshua Klein of Pitchfork said Cee Lo Green "happily shares (the spotlight) with Earth, Wind & Fire's Philip Bailey on "Fool For You"." Andy Kellman of Allmusic wrote "The infectiously beaming "Fool for You," served with a choppy gait, carries as much pride as Ray Charles' "A Fool for You." Jody Rosen of Rolling Stone found that "Fool for You" slides from silken ballad to gospel funk." Mike Diver of the BBC acclaimed "Fool for You is the closest an artist of today will come to capturing the magic that made Marvin Gaye such a captivating talent."

== Track listing ==
- CD single
1. "Fool for You" (featuring Melanie Fiona) – 3:45
2. "Bridges" – 4:07

== Charts ==
=== Weekly charts ===
| Chart (2011) | Peak position |
|---|---|
| US Bubbling Under Hot 100 (Billboard) | 1 |
| US Adult R&B Songs (Billboard) | 1 |
| US Hot R&B/Hip-Hop Songs (Billboard) | 13 |

=== Year-end charts ===
| Chart (2011) | Position |
|---|---|
| US Hot R&B/Hip-Hop Songs (Billboard) | 79 |
| Chart (2012) | Position |
| US Hot R&B/Hip-Hop Songs (Billboard) | 51 |

== Credits and personnel ==
- Lead vocals – Cee Lo Green
- Producers – Jack Splash
- Songwriters – Callaway, Hallim, Jack Splash
- Label: Elektra Records

== Release history ==
| Region | Date | Format | Label |
|---|---|---|---|
| United States | March 8, 2011 | Urban radio | Elektra |
| United States | May 3, 2011 | Digital download | Elektra |
| United States | May 3, 2011 | CD single | Elektra |
