= The Lady Killer (album) =

Studio album by CeeLo Green
- Released: November 9, 2010
- Genres: Soul; R&B; funk; pop; neo soul
- Length: 45:49
- Label: Elektra
- Producers: Alan Nglish; Ben H. Allen; Element; Fraser T. Smith; Jack Splash; Paul Epworth; Salaam Remi; The Smeezingtons

CeeLo Green chronology
Cee-Lo Green... Is the Soul Machine (2004)	The Lady Killer (2010)	Cee Lo's Magic Moment (2012)

Singles from The Lady Killer
- 1. "Fuck You" Released: August 19, 2010; 2. "It's OK" Released: December 27, 2010; 3. "Fool for You" Released: March 8, 2011; 4. "Bright Lights Bigger City" Released: March 27, 2011; 5. "I Want You (Hold Onto Love)" Released: June 5, 2011; 6. "Cry Baby" Released: October 10, 2011; 7. "Anyway" Released: December 11, 2011

The Lady Killer is the third studio album by American singer CeeLo Green. It was released November 9, 2010, by Elektra Records. Production for the album was handled by Salaam Remi, Element, The Smeezingtons, Fraser T. Smith, Paul Epworth, and Jack Splash.

The album debuted at number nine on the US Billboard 200 chart, selling 41,000 copies in its first week. It achieved respectable chart success elsewhere and produced three singles, including the international hit "Fuck You". The album has sold 498,000 copies in the United States as of October 2012, and it has been certified double Platinum in the United Kingdom. The Lady Killer received generally positive reviews from critics, who praised its production, classicist soul music approach, and Green's vocal performance.

== Recording ==
Green reportedly "spent three years on The Lady Killer, recording close to 70 songs". Thirteen tracks that didn't make the final selection for The Lady Killer were leaked online in June 2010 as an album titled Stray Bullets including the song "You Don't Shock Me Anymore", and collaborations with The B-52's ("Cho Cho The Cat"), Soko (a remix of "I'll Kill Her"), and Goodie Mob ("Night Train").

== Release and promotion ==
The album was released on November 9, 2010, by Elektra Records. It was made available for streaming at NPR through to November 9, 2010.

=== Singles ===
The album's lead single, "Fuck You", was released on August 19, 2010, and charted at number two on the US Billboard Hot 100. It also became an international hit and peaked within the top-10 of charts in several countries, including number one in the Netherlands and the United Kingdom. The radio edit of the song was entitled "Forget You", while another edit is simply entitled "FU". A music video for the song was released on YouTube on August 19, 2010, featuring the lyrics of the song appearing on different colored backgrounds with film grain overlaid on the video. The video went viral, receiving over two million views within a week of its release. The official music video was released on September 1, 2010.

The second single, "It's OK", was released on December 13, 2010. It charted on the UK Singles Chart, peaking at 20. "Fool for You" was solicited to radio as the album's third single on March 8, 2011. The album's fourth single, "Bright Lights Bigger City", was released on March 27, 2011. The album's fifth single, "I Want You", was released on June 5, 2011. "Cry Baby" was released as the album's sixth single on September 12. The seventh single and the first from The Platinum Edition of the album, "Anyway", was released on December 11.

=== Live performances ===
Green toured during 2010 and 2011 with an all-female backing band named Scarlet Fever, performing for Taratata, Reeperbahn Festival, the BBC, Late Show with David Letterman, W's Symmetry Live Concert Series, Saturday Night Live, the Jimmy Kimmel Live! special show following the Academy Awards, and many other venues. Core band members included Sharon Aguilar (lead guitar, violin), Brittany Brooks (drums), Theresa Flaminio (keyboards, background vocals), and Regina Zernay Roberts (bass guitar, moog synthesizer).

== Commercial performance ==
The album debuted at number nine on the US Billboard 200 chart, with first-week sales of 41,000 copies in the United States. It also entered at number two on the US Top R&B/Hip-Hop Albums chart. As of October 2012, the album has sold 498,000 copies in the United States.

The Lady Killer attained moderate international charting, in the United Kingdom, the album debuted at number 10 on the Top 40 Albums, and it reached number one on the Top 40 RnB Albums chart. On November 4, 2011, The Lady Killer was certified double Platinum by the British Phonographic Industry, for shipments of 600,000 copies in the UK. As of December 2011, the album had sold 621,000 copies in the UK. It was the third biggest selling R&B / hip-hop album of 2011 in the UK.

In Canada, it debuted at number 29 on the Top 100 Albums chart. It also entered at number 91 in Belgium, at number 18 in Ireland, at number 43 in the Netherlands, at number 24 in Australia, at number 90 in France, at number 53 in Sweden, and at number 16 in Scotland.

== Critical reception ==
Professional ratings
Aggregate scores
Source	Rating
AnyDecentMusic?	7.8/10
Metacritic	80/100
Review scores
Source	Rating
AllMusic	4/5 stars
The A.V. Club	A−
The Daily Telegraph	4/5 stars
Entertainment Weekly	A−
The Guardian	4/5 stars
The Independent	5/5 stars
NME	7/10
Pitchfork	7.3/10
Rolling Stone	4/5 stars
Spin	8/10

The Lady Killer received rave reviews from critics. At Metacritic, which assigns a normalized rating out of 100 to reviews from mainstream publications, the album received an average score of 80, based on 33 reviews. AllMusic writer Andy Kellman called it "a thoroughly engrossing album". Entertainment Weekly's Leah Greenblatt commented that the album "both honors and tweaks the tropes of vintage songcraft with hefty doses of sweet Motown / Stax boogie, a smattering of Curtis Mayfield superfly, and imaginary theme songs for James Bond". Bill Friskics-Warren of The Washington Post wrote that it "offers some of the most ebullient pop this side of old-school hit-machines ranging from Holland–Dozier–Holland to Gamble and Huff". Chicago Tribune writer Greg Kot lauded Green's "retro-soul classicism and dark-tinged eccentricity". Slant Magazine's Huw Jones praised the album's accessibility and "buoyant nü-Motown and progressive soul", while noting Green's singing as "absolutely flawless. Pitch-perfect from tip to toe". Rolling Stone writer Jody Rosen dubbed The Lady Killer "one of the most engrossing records of 2010".

In a mixed review, Jon Caramanica of The New York Times found Green to be "reduced to an accent piece [...] purposefully restrained", stating "Green's vocals are buried low in the mix, mere decoration for the arrangements and textures [...] crisp, lovely and certainly well rehearsed". Jer Fairall of PopMatters found the album's premise inconsistent, writing that it "feels relatively safe [...] a thoroughly likeable little trifle of a record", but added that "As a throwback, it is indeed impeccable". Despite viewing it as less "gleefully unhinged" than his previous work, NME's Jason Draper cited it as Green's "most focused solo album". The Observer's Killian Fox wrote that "his idiosyncrasies have proven too potent to repress". Nitsuh Abebe of New York called it "suitably theatrical—a lavishly orchestrated thing", and lauded Green's dramatist "lady-killer persona" and "artifice". Los Angeles Times writer Margaret Wappler noted "a glassy modernity that makes the album a sexy sonic adventure of loving and leaving" and commented that "it's not Green's caddish ways that charm. Rather [...] it's his big heart underneath".

Despite writing that "he's not always lethal", Pitchfork's Joshua Klein commented that Green "manages to avoid being both too rough or too smooth", complimenting his "contemporary, confident conception of soul music" and the album's "de rigueur synthetic frills". Barry Walters of Spin noted its "detailed encapsulations of Saturday-night transcendence and Sunday-morning love pains" and its music "beautifully busy 21st-century Motown as greasy as it is vibrant". Amy Linden of The Village Voice called the album "romantic—chaste, even", writing that "[Green]'s written a manual on how to both break and mend someone's heart". The Independent's Andy Gill commented that "he manages to avoid all the bubblebath boudoir-soul cliches that litter most R&B albums". Chicago Sun-Times writer Thomas Conner called it "an utter delight", writing that "every song rings fresh, modern, anthemic, packed with earth, wind and fire".

=== Accolades ===
The Lady Killer was nominated for a Grammy Award for Best Pop Vocal Album, presented at the 54th Grammy Awards in 2012. The song "Fool for You", featuring Melanie Fiona, won Grammy Awards for Best Traditional R&B Performance and Best R&B Song. "Fuck You" won the Grammy Award for Best Urban/Alternative Performance and was nominated for Record of the Year and Song of the Year.

== Track listing ==
No.	Title	Writer(s)	Producer(s)	Length
1.	"The Lady Killer Theme (Intro)"	Thomas Callaway	Grey Area	1:37
2.	"Bright Lights Bigger City"	Ben H. Allen; Callaway; Tony Reyes	Ben H. Allen; Graham Marsh (co.)	3:38
3.	"Fuck You"	Brody Brown; Callaway; Bruno Mars; Philip Lawrence; Ari Levine	The Smeezingtons	3:43
4.	"Wildflower"	Callaway; Fraser T. Smith	Fraser T. Smith	4:02
5.	"Bodies"	Callaway; Salaam Remi	Salaam Remi	3:43
6.	"Love Gun" (featuring Lauren Bennett)	Callaway; Mack David; Jerry Livingston; Terrence Simpkins	CeeLo Green; Salaam Remi (co.)	3:20
7.	"Satisfied"	Callaway; Rick Nowels	Fraser T Smith	3:26
8.	"I Want You"	Callaway; Smith; Jack Splash	Fraser T. Smith; Jack Splash	3:36
9.	"Cry Baby"	Callaway; Nowels	Fraser T. Smith	3:27
10.	"Fool for You" (featuring Philip Bailey)	Callaway; Splash	Jack Splash	3:40
11.	"It's OK"	Callaway; Hitesh Ceon; Noel Fisher; Kim Ofstad	Element; Paul Epworth (co.)	3:46
12.	"Old Fashioned"	Callaway; Alan Kasirye	Alan Nglish; Salaam Remi (co.)	3:24
13.	"No One's Gonna Love You"	Creighton Barrett; Benjamin Bridwell; Rob Hampton	Paul Epworth	3:29
14.	"The Lady Killer Theme (Outro)"	Callaway	Grey Area	0:58

International edition
No.	Title	Writer(s)	Producer(s)	Length
1.	"The Lady Killer Theme (Intro)"	Thomas Callaway	Grey Area	1:37
2.	"Bright Lights Bigger City"	Ben H. Allen; Callaway	Ben H. Allen; Graham Marsh (co.)	3:38
3.	"Forget You"	Brody Brown; Callaway; Bruno Mars; Philip Lawrence; Ari Levine	The Smeezingtons	3:42
4.	"Wildflower"	Callaway; Fraser T. Smith	Fraser T Smith	4:02
5.	"Bodies"	Callaway; Salaam Remi	Salaam Remi	3:43
6.	"Please" (featuring Selah Sue)			5:00
7.	"Satisfied"	Callaway; Rick Nowels	Fraser T. Smith	3:26
8.	"I Want You"	Callaway; Fraser T. Smith; Jack Splash	Fraser T. Smith; Jack Splash	3:36
9.	"Cry Baby"	Callaway; Nowels	Fraser T. Smith	3:27
10.	"Fool for You" (featuring Philip Bailey)	Callaway; Splash	Jack Splash	3:40
11.	"It's OK"	Callaway; Hitesh Ceon; Noel Fisher; Kim Ofstad	Element; Paul Epworth (co.)	3:46
12.	"Old Fashioned"	Callaway; Alan Kasirye	Alan Nglish; Salaam Remi (co.)	3:24
13.	"The Lady Killer Theme (Outro)"	Callaway	Grey Area	0:58
14.	"Fuck You"	Brody Brown; Callaway; Bruno Mars; Philip Lawrence; Ari Levine	The Smeezingtons	3:43

Japan bonus tracks
No.	Title	Length
15.	"Georgia"	3:46
16.	"Grand Canyon"	3:25

iTunes and Amazon bonus tracks
No.	Title	Length
15.	"Everybody Loves You (Baby)"	3:32
16.	"Scarlet Fever"	4:45

Best Buy exclusive bonus tracks
No.	Title	Length
15.	"Red Hot Lover"	3:15
16.	"Grand Canyon"	3:25

=== The Platinum Edition ===
Green released The Platinum Edition of The Lady Killer on November 28, 2011. The repackaged album contains the single "Anyway", released on December 11, 2011, which served as the album's sixth overall single and first single from the Platinum Edition. Other new tracks include "Scarlet Fever" and the single version of "I Want You (Hold on to Love)". "Love Gun" and "No One's Gonna Love You" are also new for international markets. "Please" (featuring Selah Sue) was removed.

No.	Title	Writer(s)	Producer(s)	Length
1.	"The Lady Killer Theme (Intro)"	Thomas Callaway	Grey Area	1:37
2.	"Bright Lights Bigger City"	Ben H. Allen; Callaway; Tony Reyes	Ben H. Allen; Graham Marsh (co.)	3:38
3.	"Forget You"	Brody Brown; Callaway; Bruno Mars; Philip Lawrence; Ari Levine	The Smeezingtons	3:42
4.	"Wildflower"	Callaway; Fraser T Smith	Fraser T Smith	4:02
5.	"Bodies"	Callaway; Salaam Remi	Salaam Remi	3:43
6.	"Love Gun" (featuring Lauren Bennett)	Callaway; Mack David; Jerry Livingston; Terrence Simpkins	CeeLo Green; Salaam Remi (co.)	3:20
7.	"Satisfied"	Callaway; Rick Nowels	Fraser T Smith	3:26
8.	"I Want You (Hold on to Love)"	Callaway; Smith; Jack Splash	Fraser T Smith; Jack Splash	3:30
9.	"Cry Baby"	Callaway; Nowels	Fraser T Smith	3:27
10.	"Fool for You" (featuring Philip Bailey)	Callaway; Splash	Jack Splash	3:40
11.	"It's OK"	Callaway; Hitesh Ceon; Noel Fisher; Kim Ofstad	Element; Paul Epworth (co.)	3:46
12.	"Old Fashioned"	Callaway; Alan Kasirye	Alan Nglish; Salaam Remi (co.)	3:24
13.	"No One's Gonna Love You"	Creighton Barrett; Benjamin Bridwell; Rob Hampton	Paul Epworth	3:29
14.	"Scarlet Fever"	Callaway; Brian Burton; Laurie Steele	Callaway	4:45
15.	"Anyway"	Callaway; Eric Frederic; Ross Golan; Rivers Cuomo; Josh Alexander	Wallpaper; Daniel Ledinsky (co.)	3:34
16.	"The Lady Killer Theme (Outro)"	Callaway	Grey Area	0:58
17.	"Fuck You"	Brody Brown; Callaway; Bruno Mars; Philip Lawrence; Ari Levine	The Smeezingtons	3:43

Notes

- (co.) denotes co-producer
- On the clean version of the album, the song "Fuck You" is renamed as "Forget You".

== Personnel ==
Credits for The Lady Killer adapted from AllMusic.

=== Musicians ===
- Jo Allen – violin
- Max Baillie – viola
- Brody Brown – composer, musician
- Thomas Callaway – composer, executive producer, producer, vocals
- Mike Caren – A&R, musician
- Natalie Cavey – viola
- Stephanie Cavey – violin
- Dena Chutuk – background vocals
- Cathy Collwell – double bass
- Rosie Danvers – brass arrangement, cello, leader, string arrangements, string engineer
- Robin Finck – guitar
- Fraser T. Smith – bass, composer, guitar, keyboards, producer
- Bradley Hagen – drums
- Vincent Henry – horn
- Sally Herbert – string arrangements
- Sally Jackson – violin
- Bryony James – cello
- Kotono Sato – violin
- Philip Lawrence – composer, background vocals
- Tommy Lee – drums
- Ari Levine – composer, musician
- Mason Levy – musician
- Mike Lovatt – trumpet
- Jacob Lutrell – musician
- Bruno Mars – composer, musician
- Danny Marsden – trumpet
- Eleanor Mathieson – violin
- Howard McGill – baritone saxophone
- Jeremy Morris – violin
- Emma Owens – viola
- Pino Palladino – bass
- Kerenza Peacock – violin
- Ruston Pomeroy – violin
- Hayley Pomfrett – violin
- Tony Reyes – composer, bass
- Jenny Sacha – violin
- Kotono Sato – violin
- Ash Soan – drums
- Ayak Thiik – background vocals
- Peter Tomasso – brass arrangement
- Nikolaj Torp Larsen – musician
- Bruce White – viola
- Martin Williams – tenor saxophone
- Jerry Wonder – musician
- John Wicks - composer, drummer

=== Production ===
- Niall Acott – engineer
- Ben H. Allen – composer, engineer, mixing, producer
- Beatriz Artola – engineer
- Steven Barlow – engineer
- Creighton Barrett – composer
- Chris Baseford – engineer
- Benjamin Birdwell – composer
- Julian Broad – photography
- Paul Brown – A&R
- Hitesh Ceon – producer, composer, engineer, musician
- Mack David – composer
- Tom Elmhirst – mixing
- Paul Epworth – musician, producer
- Noel Fisher – composer
- Robert Gardner – assistant
- Chris Gehringer – mastering
- The Grey Area – producer
- James Hampton – composer
- Mike Jackson – A&R
- Craig Kallman – executive producer
- Alan Kasirye – composer
- Jerry Livingston – composer
- Erik Madrid – assistant
- Manny Marroquin – mixing
- Graham Marsh – engineer, mixing, percussion, producer, programming, vocal producer
- K.C. "Cognac" Morton – executive producer
- Alan Nglish – producer
- Rick Nowels – composer, vocal producer
- Kim Ofstad – producer, composer, engineer, musician
- Dan Parry – engineer
- Christian Plata – assistant
- Steve Price – engineer
- Mark Rankin – engineer
- John Martin – assistant engineer
- Salaam Remi – bass, composer, guitar, horn arrangements, producer, string arrangements
- Stephen Coleman - string arrangements
- Anthony Kronfle – assistant engineer
- Isabel Seeliger-Morley – assistant, engineer
- Terrence Simpkins – additional production, composer
- The Smeezingtons – producer
- Fraser T Smith – composer, producer, musician
- Jack Splash – composer, producer

== Charts ==
=== Weekly charts ===
Weekly chart performance for The Lady Killer
Chart (2010)	Peak position
Australian Albums (ARIA)	24
Austrian Albums (Ö3 Austria)	63
Belgian Albums (Ultratop Flanders)	51
Belgian Heatseekers Albums (Ultratop Wallonia)	1
Danish Albums (Hitlisten)	38
Dutch Albums (Album Top 100)	34
French Albums (SNEP)	90
German Albums (Offizielle Top 1009	77
Irish Albums (IRMA)	18
New Zealand Albums (RMNZ)	38
Scottish Albums (Official Charts)	4
Swedish Albums (Sverigetopplistan)	53
Swiss Albums (Schweizer Hitparade)	56
UK Albums (Official Charts)	3
UK R&B Albums (Official Charts)	1
US Billboard 200	9
US Top R&B/Hip-Hop Albums (Billboard)	2

=== Year-end charts ===
2010 year-end chart performance for The Lady Killer
Chart (2010)	Position
UK Albums (OCC)	102

2011 year-end chart performance for The Lady Killer
Chart (2011)	Position
UK Albums (OCC)	13

2012 year-end chart performance for The Lady Killer
Chart (2011)	Position
US Top R&B/Hip-Hop Albums (Billboard)	95

=== Decade-end charts ===
Decade-end chart performance for The Lady Killer
Chart (2010–19)	Position
UK Albums (OCC)	81

== Certifications ==
Certifications for The Lady Killer
Region	Certification	Certified units/sales
Ireland (IRMA)	Platinum	15,000^{^}
United Kingdom (BPI)	2× Platinum	756,000
^{^} Shipments figures based on certification alone.

== Release history ==
Release dates and formats for The Lady Killer
Region	Date	Label
Netherlands	November 5, 2010	Elektra
France	November 5, 2010	Elektra
Ireland	November 5, 2010	Elektra
Australia	November 5, 2010	Elektra
Belgium	November 5, 2010	Elektra
United Kingdom	November 8, 2010	Elektra
Denmark	November 8, 2010	Elektra
Greece	November 8, 2010	Elektra
Finland	November 8, 2010	Elektra
New Zealand	November 8, 2010	Elektra
Sweden	November 8, 2010	Elektra
Spain	November 8, 2010	Elektra
Norway	November 9, 2010	Elektra
Italy	November 9, 2010	Elektra
United States	November 9, 2010	Elektra
Israel	November 18, 2010	Elektra
Germany	November 19, 2010	Elektra
Brazil	November 30, 2010	Elektra
Japan	December 1, 2010	Elektra
