= Stronger (Kate Earl album) =

Studio album by Kate Earl
- Released: November 20, 2012
- Genre: Singer-songwriter
- Length: 42:30
- Label: Downtown Records
- Producer: Josh Deutsch, Brett Dennen

Kate Earl chronology
Kate Earl (2009)	Stronger (2012)

Stronger is the third album from Kate Earl released on November 20, 2012 on Downtown Records. The first single, "One Woman Army", was released on September 18, 2012.

The album was rated 4.5 out of 5 stars by AllMusic.

== Track listing ==
1. "Stronger" – 3:14
2. "One Woman Army" – 3:55
3. "I Don’t Want To Be Alone" – 3:07
4. "Shadows & Light" – 4:08
5. "California" – 3:45
6. "Native Son" – 4:18
7. "Not The End Of The World" – 3:37
8. "Loyalty" – 2:31
9. "Raven" – 3:36
10. "Wicked Love" – 3:05
11. "Is There Anyone Out There" – 3:29
12. "I Get Around" – 3:35

42:20

== Release history ==
Country	Date	Format
United States	November 19, 2012	All
