= Scarlet Fever (band) =

All-female backing band of Cee Lo Green

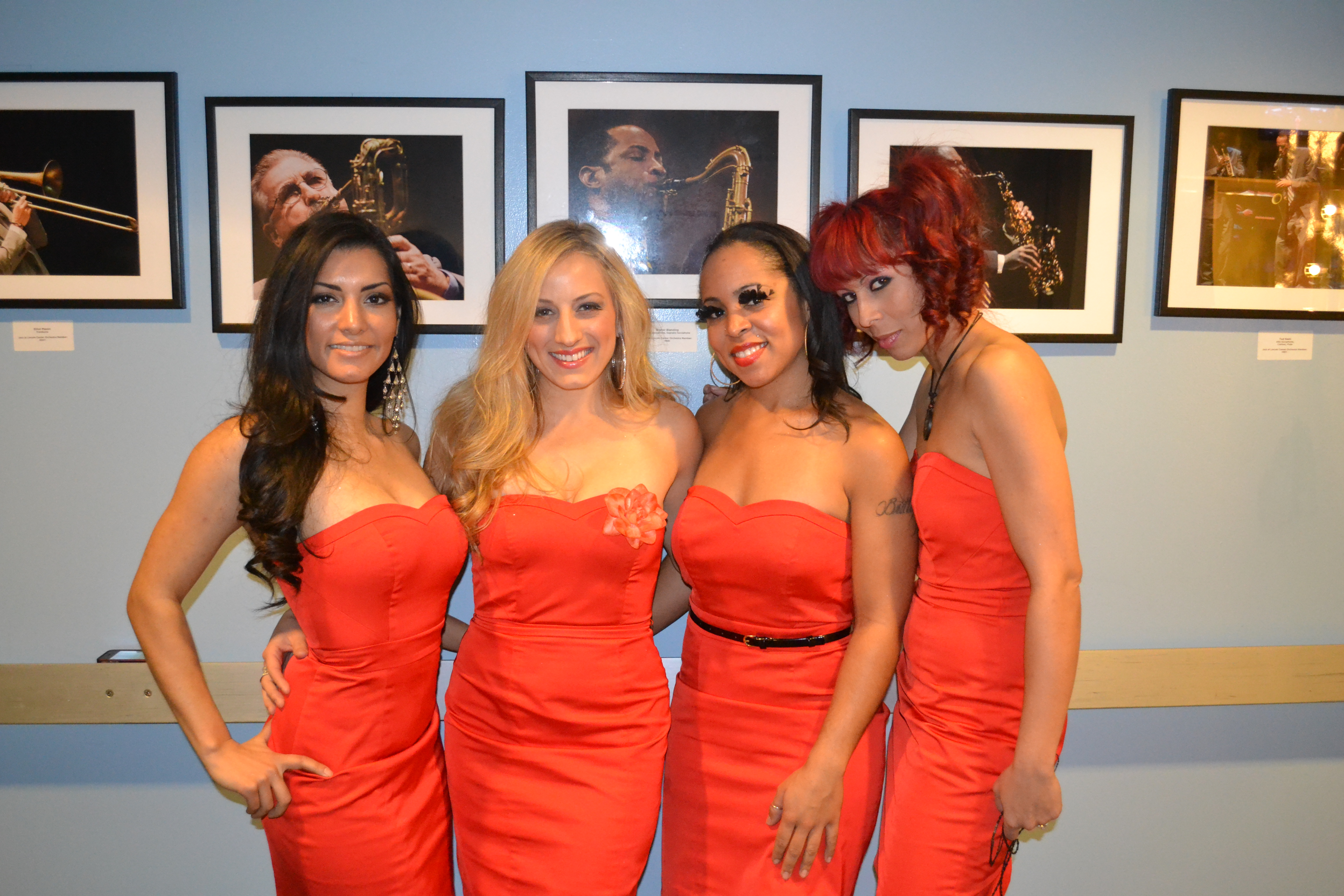
- Scarlet Fever in 2015

Background information
- Origin: Los Angeles, California, United States
- Genres: Soul; pop; funk; neo soul
- Years active: 2010–present
- Members: Sharon Aguilar; Brittany Brooks; DANiiVORY; Regina Zernay Roberts
- Past members: Danielle Haim; Chloe Pappas; JinJoo Lee

Scarlet Fever is an all-female backing band that toured with Cee Lo Green during 2010 and 2011. Originally formed for promotional tour events, the popularity of the "Fuck You" single and The Lady Killer album led to multiple television appearances reaching an audience of millions in Europe and North America. With Green, they performed full length concerts and as an opening act for other major performers.

In 2012-2013 varying members of Scarlet Fever performed in the bands In 4D, No Salt, and Miss President.

== Origin ==
Scarlet Fever was formed in May, 2010, for the Cee Lo Green promotional tour of "What Part of Forever" (from The Twilight Saga: Eclipse soundtrack). Auditions were held at the Musicians Institute located in Hollywood, California. This group was televised on The Tonight Show with Jay Leno (June 14, 2010), and Lopez Tonight (June 30, 2010).

Additional auditions for keyboardist were held in August, 2010, and DANiiVORY née Theresa Flaminio joined the core group. Their first tour, performing singles from The Lady Killer album, began in Paris, France, with a televised appearance on Taratata. Other radio and satellite television appearances were taped for later broadcast on LeMouve, and Album de la semaine (Album of the week).

Their first concert performance at the Reeperbahn Festival trod the trail blazed by The Beatles in Hamburg, Germany. Their second concert appearance was a "surprise" addition to BBC 1Xtra Live from Wembley Arena in London, England.

During multiple tours of Europe and North America, further radio and television performances followed on popular shows for BBC, Late Show with David Letterman, The Colbert Report, Saturday Night Live, the Jimmy Kimmel Live! special show following the Academy Awards, and many other venues.

== Personnel ==
- Sharon Aguilar (lead guitar, violin)
- Brittany Brooks (drums)
- DANiiVORY (keyboards, background vocals)
- Regina Zernay Roberts (bass guitar, Moog synthesizer)

=== Additional performers ===
- Danielle Haim (guitar) appeared on The Tonight Show with Jay Leno (June 14, 2010).
- Chloe Pappas (guitar) appeared on Lopez Tonight (June 30, 2010).
- JinJoo Lee (guitar) appeared in Paris, Hamburg, and London (late September and early October, 2010).
- Ashley Reeve (bass)

== Live performances ==
Widely distributed performances that introduce a new album, single (or its variant wording), or significant phase of the tour.

=== The Lady Killer promotional tour ===
1st leg
| September 21, 2010 | Taratata | "Fuck You" |
| September 24, 2010 | Reeperbahn Festival | "Fuck You" – "Perfect Day" |
| September 25, 2010 | BBC 1Xtra Live from Wembley Arena | "Forget You" |
| October 8, 2010 (October 5, 2010) | Later... with Jools Holland | "Fuck You" – "Old Fashioned" – "Lonely Teardrops" |
2nd leg
| October 26, 2010 | BBC 1Xtra | "Wildflower" – "Forget You" |
| November 3, 2010 | BBC Live Lounge | "Forget You" – "Radioactive" |
| November 8, 2010 | Late Show with David Letterman | "F--- --u!" (words silently omitted) |
| November 9, 2010 | The Colbert Report | "Fox News" |
| November 11, 2010 (November 3, 2010) | The Guardian How I Wrote ... | "Fuck You" (acoustic) |
| November 11, 2010 | Symmetry Live Concert Series | "The Lady Killer Theme" – "Cho Cha" – "ChamPain" – "Bodies" – "Wildflower" – "I Want You" – "Satisfied" – "Cry Baby" – "Old Fashioned" – "Bright Lights Bigger City" – "Fool for You" – "It's OK" – "Fuck You" |
3rd leg
| December 6, 2010 | Capitol FM Jingle Bell Ball | "Forget You" |
| December 9, 2010 | Le Grande Journal | "Fuck You" – "Bright Lights Bigger City" |
| December 18, 2010 | Schlag den Raab | "Fuck You" |
| December 19, 2010 | Children in Need 2010 | |
| December 25, 2010 | Top of the Pops Christmas special | |

- Parenthetical dates indicate the performance had an earlier limited broadcast or recording.

=== 2011 concert tours ===
The 2011 schedule included full length concerts and opening acts for other major performers, interspersed with continued album promotion. Their public concert at American University was followed the next day by a Saturday Night Live appearance promoting the singles "Bright Lights Bigger City" and "Forget You" to a broad American audience. They opened for Prince at Madison Square Garden, gave charity performances for Woman's Day Red Dress awards(Lincoln Center) and the Women's Cancer Research Fund (Regent Beverly Wilshire), had a joint concert with Big Boi and Goodie Mob at Club Nokia, then appeared the next week during the NBA All-Star Weekend Slam Dunk Contest at Staples Center.

They returned to Europe for Shockwaves NME Awards Big Gig opening for Foo Fighters at Wembley Arena, and the charity Let's Dance for Comic Relief. Then the next day, they all flew back halfway around the world for a late night Jimmy Kimmel Live! special show following the Academy Awards.

The March–April European concert tour began in Glasgow, Manchester, Birmingham, and then London, England at the historic Shepherd's Bush Empire. Crossing the Channel, they played in Paris, Antwerp, Amsterdam, Zurich, and Luxembourg. Finally, they returned for a televised appearance on Later... with Jools Holland, then finished the tour with the twice rescheduled concert in Bristol, England.

The April–May American concert tour began at the Coachella Festival, where Cee Lo arrived a half hour late after a delayed flight and heavy traffic into the site. Organizers cut short the performance for only the second time in Coachella history, causing consternation for both audience and musicians. Performances received more favorable reviews at St. Louis, Missouri, Morgantown, West Virginia, SunFest in West Palm Beach, Florida, the Schaeffer Eye Center Crawfish Boil in Birmingham, Alabama, the Beale Street Music Festival in Memphis, Tennessee, and the Extravaganza Music Festival in Santa Barbara, California. Scheduling problems reprised at the Hangout Music Festival in Gulf Shores, Alabama. After playing in New York City earlier the same day, their flight was delayed. This time, police escorted them through traffic. Meanwhile, the Foo Fighters graciously played during the delay. Serendipitously, Cee Lo arrived as the Foo Fighters covered Prince's Darling Nikki, a song they'd performed together (above). He joined them on stage and transitioned to Scarlet Fever for the remainder of the set. Sharon Aguilar reminisced, “Plugged [my guitar] right into the amp; no time for a pedalboard… no fancy in-ear monitors or anything like that… More energy… it ended up being probably my favorite live show that we’ve ever done.”

The band also taped television performances for VH1 Storytellers and FUSE TV Talking to Strangers. They performed live on The Today Show.
