= Anyway (CeeLo Green song) =

Single by CeeLo Green

from the album The Lady Killer: The Platinum Edition
- Released: December 11, 2011
- Recorded: 2011
- Genre: Dance-pop, R&B
- Length: 3:34
- Label: Elektra
- Songwriters: Callaway, Eric Frederic, Ross Golan, Rivers Cuomo, Josh Alexander
- Producers: Wallpaper., Daniel Ledinsky

CeeLo Green singles chronology
"Cry Baby" (2011)	"Anyway" (2011)	"Fight to Win" (2012)

"Anyway" is the seventh official single and first single from The Platinum Edition of American soul singer CeeLo Green's third studio album, The Lady Killer. The single was released via digital download on December 11, 2011. The lyric video for the song was premiered on November 8, 2011 through Cee Lo Green's official YouTube channel.

== Background ==
The song will be released as part of The Platinum Edition of The Lady Killer, which contains a total of seventeen tracks. It was written by Green alongside Eric Frederic, Ross Golan, Rivers Cuomo and Josh Alexander and produced by Wallpaper and Daniel Ledinsky. "Anyway" will be released alongside three other previously unreleased songs in the UK.

== Music video ==
The official music video was released on November 24, 2011, and features bright lights and scantily-clad dancers.

== Track listing ==
Digital Download

1. "Anyway" (Explicit Version) – 3:34
2. "Bright Lights, Bigger City" (BBC Radio 1 Live Lounge Session) – 3:46
3. "Inhaler" (BBC Radio 1 Live Lounge Session) – 3:12
4. "Anyway" (Rhythm Shed Remix) – 3:45

UK Promotional CD Single

1. "Anyway" (Clean Version) – 3:33
2. "Anyway" (Instrumental Version) – 3:33

== Credits and personnel ==
- Lead vocals – Cee Lo Green
- Producers – Fraser T Smith
- Lyrics – Callaway, Fraser T Smith, Rick Nowels
- Label: Elektra Records

== Charts ==
Chart (2011)	Peak position
Hungary (Rádiós Top 40)	8
UK Hip Hop/R&B (OCC)	12
UK Singles (OCC)	52

== Release history ==
Region	Date	Format	Label
Hungary	November 11, 2011	Digital download, radio airplay	Elektra
United Kingdom	December 11, 2011	Digital download	Elektra
