= DANiiVORY =

American musician

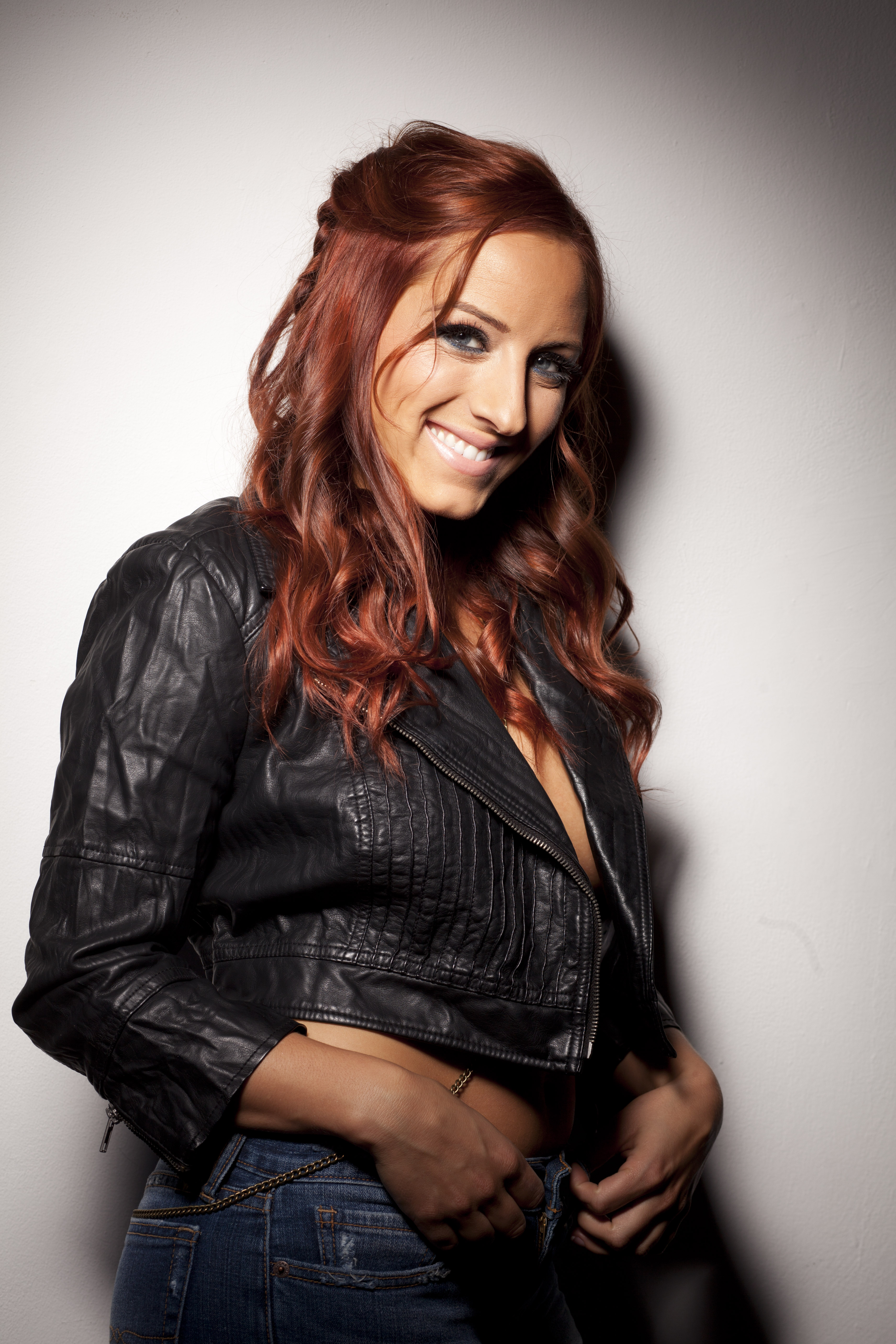
- DANiiVORY in 2012

Background information
- Birth name: Theresa Danielle Flaminio
- Born: Pittsburgh, Pennsylvania, U.S.
- Genres: Soul; rock; pop; R&B; electronica; dance-pop
- Occupations: Singer; musician
- Instruments: Vocals; keyboards; guitar; bass; violin; drums
- Years active: 2005–present
- Formerly of: Imagine Dragons; Scarlet Fever
- Website: daniivory.com

Theresa Danielle Flaminio Romack, known professionally as DANiiVORY, is an American singer and musician. She is currently touring with R&B artist Rhye, and is also pursuing a solo career.

During 2010 and 2011, she was a keyboardist with Scarlet Fever, the all-female backing band touring with Cee Lo Green. She and varying members of Scarlet Fever have performed with other frontwomen as 'In 4D', 'No Salt', and 'Miss President'. From 2012 to 2014, she toured with Beyoncé's all-female backing band, the Suga Mamas. A former member of Imagine Dragons, she has also toured with 2NE1, Bridgit Mendler, Gallant, and has both founded and performed with several other groups.

== Biography ==
Flaminio was raised in Wexford, Pennsylvania. Her mother was a liturgical musician, her father an electrical engineer. She graduated from North Allegheny Senior High School, and completed a B.A. at Miami University (Ohio) in Zoology with a minor in Music Composition. After a year of post-graduate work in vocal performance at Duquesne University, she was awarded a talent scholarship from Berklee College of Music, and an additional B.M. in Contemporary Writing, Production, and Performance.

=== Influences ===
Her influences span various genres and artists, including The Beatles, Stevie Wonder, Madonna, Michael Jackson, Janet Jackson, Teena Marie, Sarah Vaughan, Ella Fitzgerald, Nirvana, Erykah Badu, and Prince.

=== Cee Lo Green and Scarlet Fever ===
Beginning in August 2010, she toured with Cee Lo Green and the all-female backing band named Scarlet Fever on promotional tours for The Lady Killer album. They performed for the BBC, Late Show with David Letterman, Saturday Night Live, and many other venues. Core band members include Sharon Aguilar (lead guitar, violin), Brittany Brooks (drums), and Regina Zernay Roberts (bass guitar, Moog synthesizer).

Members of the band continued to play together in various combinations (sometimes under other band names). Aguilar, Flaminio, and Brooks performed with front woman Sammy Allen at Whisky a Go Go in April 2012, where Cee Lo joined them on stage.

=== Imagine Dragons ===
Beginning in August 2011, she played a West Coast tour with Imagine Dragons. She had attended Berklee with other members of the band, and joined temporarily after founding members Brittany and Andrew Tolman departed. Then current members included Ben McKee (bass guitar), Daniel Platzman (drums), Dan Reynolds (vocals), and Wayne Sermon (guitar).

=== 2NE1 ===
Aguilar, Flaminio, and Divinity Roxx backed 2NE1 on their New Evolution Global Tour in 9 cities among 5 countries during 2012. Their performance at the Prudential Center in Newark, New Jersey, was ranked by The New York Times critics among the best concerts of the year. The concert at the Nokia Theatre in Los Angeles ranked #29 on Billboard's Current Box Score, the first K-Pop girl group to make this rank.

=== Beyoncé ===
She toured with Beyoncé and the all-female backing band named Suga Mama for the 2013 Super Bowl XLVII halftime show, and during The Mrs. Carter Show World Tour.

=== Miss President ===
Aguilar, Brooks, and DANiiVORY have performed with Goldielox née Brittany Burton as In 4D, and debuted as Miss President at Whisky a Go Go on February 10, 2013. Their music encompasses "standard pop riffs, to neo-classical, and everything in-between." The band name was chosen as "empowering" for women, "... we can create great music just as guys do. We can do everything they do, and even better."
