= I Want You (Hold On to Love) =

Single by CeeLo Green

from the album The Lady Killer
- Released: June 5, 2011
- Recorded: 2010
- Length: 3:36
- Label: Elektra
- Songwriters: Callaway, Fraser T Smith, Jack Splash, VLJ
- Producers: Fraser T Smith, Jack Splash

CeeLo Green singles chronology
| "Bright Lights Bigger City" (2011) | "I Want You (Hold On to Love)" (2011) | "Cry Baby" (2011) |

"I Want You" is a song by American recording artist CeeLo Green, from his third studio album The Lady Killer. The song was released via digital download and CD single on June 5, 2011. French TV channel Canal+ featured a live concert on Nov. 12, 2010, a few days after the release of the album, in which a version close to the later single was performed. The single version of the track is a slightly different remix of the track, and has been issued under the title "I Want You (Hold On to Love)", to distinguish it from the album version. The music video for the song was premiered on May 27 through Cee Lo Green's official YouTube channel. The song is featured on the compilation album Now 79 despite only peaking at No. 90 on the UK Singles Chart, although it peaked at No. 27 on the UK R&B Chart.

== Background ==
While touring with the all-female backing band Scarlet Fever, Green came up with the idea for the song. Fuse likened the song to Janet Jackson's "I Want You" as it similarly "reached back to an earlier era," also having "old-fashioned strings for "sweetening" all over it" in a related fashion.

"Editing I Want You (Hold On to Love)" samples the song "Hold on to Love" by Saint Tropez, originally recorded by Page Three.

== Live performances ==
He premiered the song live on November 11, 2010, as part of the Symmetry Live Concert Series at the W Hotel in Midtown Manhattan, New York. The song is part of his setlist for his 2011 arena tour. Green also performed the song on late night BBC music show Later...with Jools Holland while he was in the UK. He also performed the song on The Graham Norton Show on May 20, 2011.

== Track listing ==
Digital Download

1. "I Want You (Hold On to Love)" – 3:30
2. "I Want You (Hold On to Love)" (Original Jack Splash Mix) – 5:04
3. "I Want You (Hold On to Love)" (Redlight Remix) – 3:26
4. "I Want You" – 3:36

UK Promotional CD Single Set

- CD1
1. "I Want You" – 3:36
2. "I Want You" (Instrumental) – 3:36
- CD2
1. "I Want You (Hold On to Love)" – 3:30
2. "I Want You (Hold On to Love)" (Original Jack Splash Mix) – 5:04
3. "I Want You (Hold On to Love)" (Redlight Remix) – 3:26
4. "I Want You (Hold On to Love)" (Instrumental Edit) – 3:30

== Credits and personnel ==
- Lead vocals – Cee Lo Green
- Bass – Pino Palladino
- Producers – Jack Splash
- Lyrics – Callaway, VLJ, Jack Splash
- Label: Elektra Records

== Charts ==
| Chart (2011) | Peak position |
|---|---|
| UK Hip Hop/R&B (Official Charts) | 27 |
| UK Singles (Official Charts) | 90 |

== Certifications ==
| Region | Certification | Certified units/sales |
|---|---|---|
| New Zealand (RMNZ) | Gold | 15,000^{‡} |
^{‡} Sales+streaming figures based on certification alone.

== Release history ==
| Region | Date | Format | Label |
|---|---|---|---|
| United Kingdom | June 5, 2011 | Digital download, CD single | Elektra |
