= Kate Earl =

American singer-songwriter

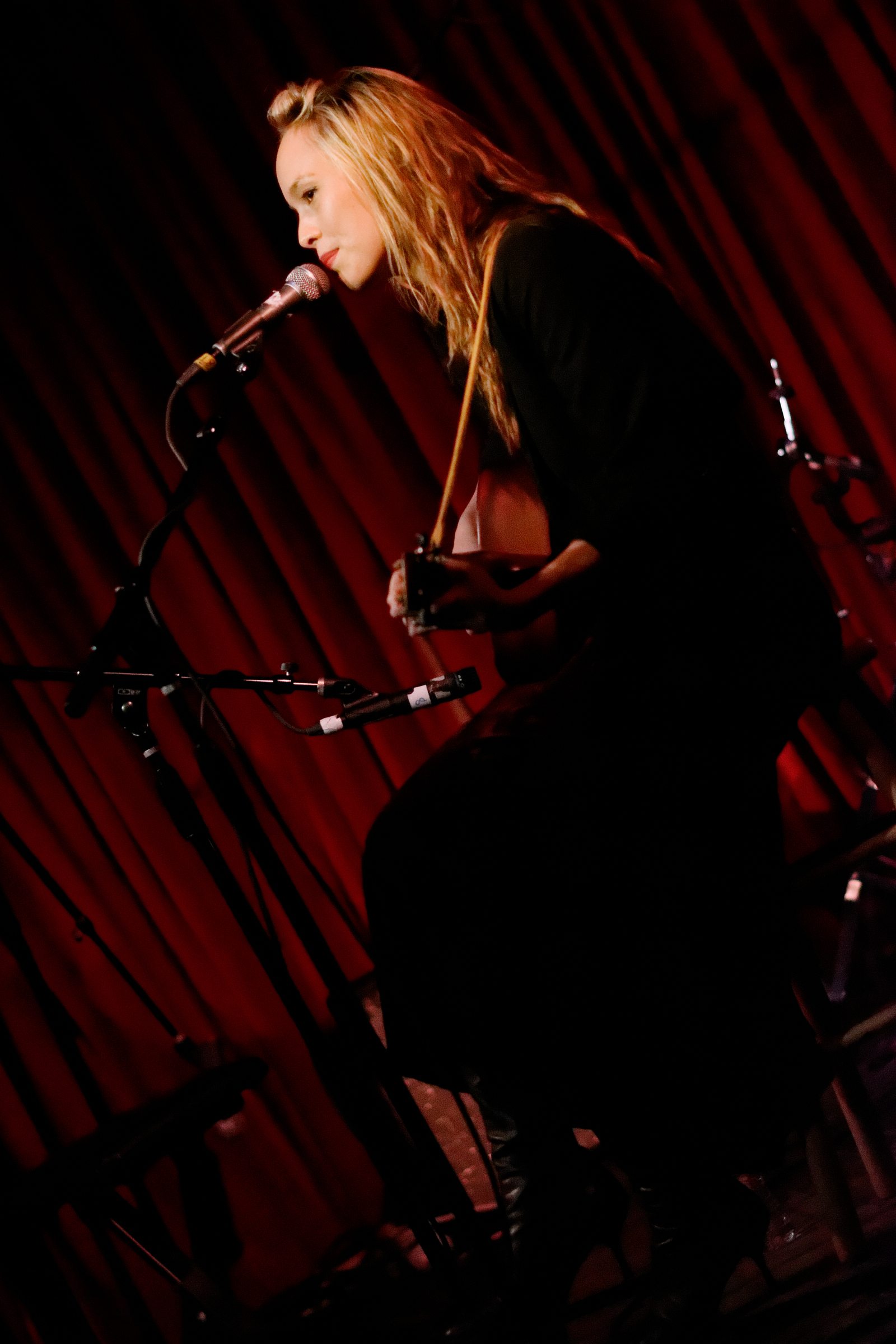

Background information
- Born: Kate Joy Smithson; Anchorage, Alaska, U.S.
- Origin: Chugiak, Alaska, U.S.
- Genres: Pop music, electro swing
- Years active: 1998–present
- Labels: Record Collection/Warner Bros. (2004–2007), Universal Republic Records (2008–2012), Downtown Records (2012–2015), BMG (2015–present)

Kate Earl (born Kate Joy Smithson) is an American singer-songwriter based out of Tennessee.

== Early life ==
Earl was born in Anchorage, Alaska. She began playing piano at four, sang in her church choir, and began playing the guitar when she was seventeen. The young singer nursed the dream to lead a musician's life in between shifts at her parents’ small-town gas station in Chugiak, Alaska.

== Musical career ==
That dream became a reality when Earl moved to Los Angeles in 2004, where her talent was promptly recognized and led to a record deal with The Record Collection whose music was distributed by Warner Bros. Records. Her debut album, Fate Is the Hunter, was released in May 2005. Earl officially changed her name to Kate Earl before the release of her second album.

Earl left Record Collection in 2007, and signed with Universal Republic the following year. A self-titled album, Kate Earl, was released as a digital download on August 18, 2009, and in physical copy on November 3, 2009.

In 2012, Earl signed with Downtown Records. Her next album, Stronger, was released on November 20, 2012, and was written and recorded with Brett Dennen, Blake Mills, and other well-respected Los Angeles musicians. The first single from the album, "One Woman Army", was released on September 18, 2012. Earl joined the Goo Goo Dolls and Matchbox Twenty as the opening act during their Summer 2013 US and Canadian tour.

In 2014, Earl decided to go indie and self produce her next album, Ransom.

In 2015, Earl submitted two songs to the BBC Introducing programme, "Good Witch" and "We Promised", and was chosen, as one of six from 200,000 entries, to appear on the BBC Introducing Stage at that year's Hyde Park festival. She was soon signed to BMG Records in the UK, and changed direction into "proper jazz", original, old-school, authentic jazz, drawing on her childhood love of Billie Holiday, Duke Ellington, and Big Band swing.

The first single taken from her 2017 album Tongue Tied is "Tongue Tied", which was nominated Radio 2's Record of the Week for the week starting Saturday February 25, 2017. The uptempo, syncopated, electro swing "Tongue Tied" uses a sample from "Disco Bob" by Professor Bobo and Bosko Slim. "Disco Bob" was used as the soundtrack of TV ads for Homebase.

Earl was announced as the opening act for Rick Astley on his UK tour starting March 2017.

Earl performed on episode three of The Bachelorette (season 9). She sang two singles, Loyalty and One Woman Army, from her album Stronger for Bachelorette Desiree Hartsock and her date Chris Siegfried.

In 2023 Earl released Rise via Position Music

== Discography ==
=== Studio albums ===
- Fate Is the Hunter (2005)
- Kate Earl (2009)
- Stronger (2012)
- Tongue Tied (2017)
- Rise (2023)
