= Kate Earl (album) =

Studio album by Kate Earl
- Released: August 18, 2009
- Genre: Pop; R&B
- Length: 42:29
- Label: Universal Republic
- Producer: Louis Biancaniello

Kate Earl chronology
Fate is the Hunter (2005)	Kate Earl (2009)	Stronger (2012)

Alternative covers
- Physical release cover

Professional ratings
Review scores
Source	Rating
Allmusic	3/5 stars

Kate Earl is the second album by American singer Kate Earl, released by Universal Republic as a digital download on August 18, 2009 and on CD on November 3, 2009. The first single released was "Melody."

== Track listing ==
1. "Nobody" — 3:26
2. "Can't Treat Me That Way" — 3:18
3. "Melody" — 3:52
4. "Only in Dreams" — 4:04
5. "All I Want" — 4:19
6. "When You're Ready" — 4:10
7. "Golden Street" — 3:53
8. "Jump" — 3:08
9. "Everlasting" — 4:06
10. "Learning to Fly" — 4:09
11. "Impossible" — 4:04
12. "Nobody" (Acoustic) — 4:07 (iTunes bonus track)

== Release history ==
Country	Date	Format
United States	August 18, 2009	Digital
United Kingdom	November 3, 2009	Physical
