= Fuck You (CeeLo Green song) =

2010 single by CeeLo Green

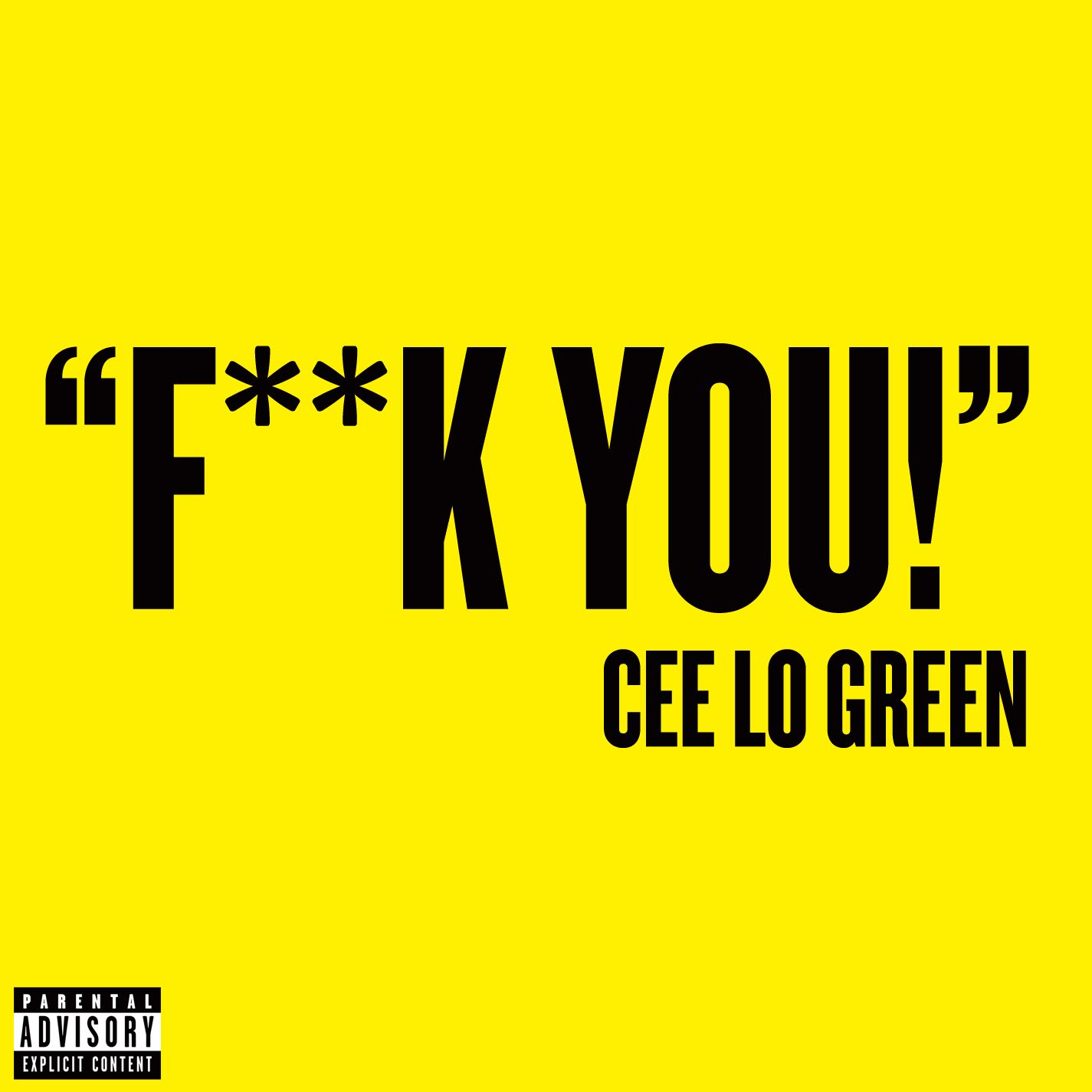

Single by CeeLo Green

from the album The Lady Killer
- Released: August 19, 2010
- Recorded: 2010
- Genre: Neo soul; R&B; funk
- Length: 3:42
- Label: Elektra
- Songwriters: CeeLo Green; Bruno Mars; Philip Lawrence; Ari Levine; Brody Brown
- Producer: The Smeezingtons

CeeLo Green singles chronology
"Pimps Don't Cry" (2007)	"Fuck You" (2010)	"It's OK" (2010)

Music videos
- "Fuck You" on YouTube; "Forget You" on YouTube

"Fuck You" (stylized as "Fuck You!" or "F**k You!"), known as "Forget You" or "FU" for the clean versions, is a song by American singer CeeLo Green. It was written as a collaboration among Green, Bruno Mars, his production team the Smeezingtons, and Brody Brown. It was released on August 19, 2010, as the lead single from Green's third solo studio album, The Lady Killer (2010).

"Fuck You" received widespread acclaim from music critics, and was an international commercial success, making the top-10 in thirteen countries, including topping charts in the United Kingdom, and number two on the Billboard Hot 100.

== Inspiration ==
In an interview with NME, CeeLo Green said that, in addition to being about a heartbreak, the song was also about the music industry itself.

Bruno Mars talked about the making of the song during a 2010 interview: "Cee Lo is one of those artists who says whatever it is that he wants to say. And what do you really want to say to a girl who leaves you for a guy with more money? Do you want to say 'good luck? Have fun in life?' No. You want to say, 'fuck you!' And if anyone's going to do it, it's going to be Cee-Lo."

== Versions ==
Several versions of "Fuck You" have been released, including the original recording, censored copies of it, and newer versions that feature other performers or significant changes to the lyrics.

The original has twice been edited to remove swearing. The first of these, which is broadcast in the music video on UK television stations and played on US radio, is called "Forget You"; the second, for UK radio use, is entitled "FU". These two are essentially identical to the original except in their treatment of profanity; "Forget You" replaces the profanity with sound effects (other than "fuck you", which is changed to "forget you" per the title), and "FU" censors words by simply silencing them except replacing "fuck you" with "eff you", also as its title suggests. The unedited original and both of the censored versions can be found on iTunes, and both "Fuck You" and "Forget You" are included in an extended play featuring the music video and lyric video released on August 19, 2010. "FU" was not released until September 21.

A fourth version of the song, featuring American rapper 50 Cent, was released to iTunes. The version was entitled "Fuck You (Heartbreaker)!", and was released only in America. The video for this version of the song incorporates scenes from the original video with extra shots of 50 Cent performing.

CeeLo performed a parody of the song, featuring an all-female backing band named "Scarlet Fever", on The Colbert Report on November 9, 2010. It is entitled "Fuck You (Fox News)", and satirizes Fox News controversies.

A sixth version of the song, entitled "Thank You", was released on May 9, 2011, with lyrics extensively re-written as a tribute to firefighters. These lyrics mention that Cee Lo's mother was a firefighter. A new version of the video was released for this version that includes scenes of Cee Lo visiting a fire station.

== Music video ==
Initially, a lyric video for "Fuck You" was released to YouTube on August 19, 2010, featuring kinetic typography, with the lyrics of the song appearing on different colored backgrounds with film grain overlaid on the video. The same thing was done in the German, Japanese and Spanish versions of the video, translating the lyrics, although the vocals remained in English.

The official music video was released on September 1, 2010. The video was directed by Matt Stawski and was filmed at Cadillac Jack's, a movie prop diner located in the Sun Valley area of Los Angeles. Taking place in a diner, the video chronicles Cee Lo's misadventures with a girl he has a crush on, known as "The Heartbreaker" throughout the video. In the beginning, a young Cee Lo goes into the diner with his parents and goes up to the Heartbreaker, who is sitting with another boy. He offers to let the Heartbreaker play with his toy garbage truck, but she ignores him and walks away with the other boy, who has a toy Ferrari F40. In his high school years, Cee Lo works at the diner as a dishwasher. He attempts to woo the Heartbreaker with a bouquet of flowers but slips on fries deliberately dropped by another boy. The flowers fly out of his hand and land on a much younger girl's lap. During his college years, Cee Lo studies in the diner with another woman implied to be his music tutor. He then attempts to woo the Heartbreaker by having the waitress draw a heart-shaped ketchup mark on her hot dog plate, but the Heartbreaker approaches him with a basket of fries and intentionally spills them on his shirt, leaving a large ketchup stain on it and causing the other diner patrons to laugh at him. Humiliated, Cee Lo then goes through an epiphany in his life and the video fast-forwards to the present day, when Cee Lo is now an adult known as "The Lady Killer" and has a fancy Cadillac Eldorado with his backup singers in the back seat. He drives past the diner to find the Heartbreaker is now working there, sweeping the front entrance while others are dancing behind her. Cee Lo waves at the Heartbreaker before driving away. The final shot is of him waving at the camera and the words "The Lady Killer" appearing on screen, before the shot freezes, thus ending the video.

The radio edit version of the video contains re-shot elements that have been mixed with parts from the original, most notably when Cee Lo is on screen and he is singing alternative lyrics, but he is not shown singing the clean lyrics in the titular chorus. Some parts of the video tend to freeze for a split second when a bowdlerized lyric is being mouthed to prevent the lips from being read. At the start of the explicit version and clean version titled FU, the mother of the young Cee Lo Green can be seen to look very shocked and taps him on the shoulder to make him turn around when he first swears. This does not happen in the clean version titled Forget You.

== Commercial performance ==
In the US, "Fuck You" debuted at No. 69 on Hot Digital Songs and No. 96 on the Billboard Hot 100. The song originally peaked at number 9 in 2010, but following Cee Lo's performance of the song at the 53rd Grammy Awards, "Fuck You" had a resurgence in popularity and climbed back up the Billboard Hot 100 chart, reaching No. 2 in its 26th chart week (making it one of the slowest climbs ever into the number 2 position) tying it with Cee Lo's previous 2006 hit "Crazy" from his musical duo project Gnarls Barkley as his highest-charting single. The song remained at No. 2 for four consecutive weeks (kept off the top by Lady Gaga's "Born This Way"). In all, the single spent a total of 48 weeks on the Hot 100. It was certified Gold on November 5, 2010.

In the week ending March 20, 2011, the song became the best-selling song of the year so far in the US, having sold 1,865,000 copies, despite never reaching No. 1 and being released in August 2010. In the subsequent week, the song surpassed 2 million copies in sales in 2011 alone, bringing its total to 3,707,000 copies. The week of April 16, 2011, the song topped the Pop Songs radio airplay chart in its 25th week, completing the longest journey to the summit in the ranking's 18-year history. "Fuck You" would go on to share the record with Demi Lovato's 2012 single "Give Your Heart a Break" before it was eventually broken by Alessia Cara's "Here" in 2016. As of April 2013, "Fuck You" had sold over 6 million copies in the U.S.

== Reception ==
=== Critical response ===
"Fuck You" received critical acclaim. Jason Lipshutz from Billboard gave "Fuck You" a positive review stating, "it's as sunny as a '60s Motown hit and as expletive-laden as an early Eminem song, a combination that fits the singer's sky-high vocals and offbeat sense of humor well. Over a twinkling piano line, bumping bass and steady percussion, Green shakes off a failed relationship with a gold digger by packing the simple pleasures of old-school soul music into tongue-in-cheek verses and a suitably soaring chorus." Nick Levine of Digital Spy gave the song four out of five stars writing: "As its title suggests, 'Fuck You' is essentially a middle finger extending from the fist of a pop single—and a gloriously catchy Motown stomper of a pop single at that." Alexandra Patsavas, music supervisor for the Twilight films, praised Mars' ability to veer between "a beautifully crafted pop song exquisitely sung" and the likes of Cee-Lo's "Fuck You". "How sublime that an artist can travel so fluidly between humor and earnestness," she remarked.

=== Accolades ===
At the 53rd Grammy Awards, "Fuck You" was nominated for Record of the Year and Song of the Year, and won Best Urban/Alternative Performance. The video was also nominated for Best Short Form Music Video. It was named the #1 song of 2010 by Time, and made the top of Metacritic's users poll. Spin and The Village Voice's Pazz & Jop critics' poll named "Fuck You" the best single of 2010. In October 2011, NME placed it at number 112 on its list "150 Best Tracks of the Past 15 Years".

== Live performances ==
Cee Lo toured with an all-female backing band named Scarlet Fever, performing "Fuck You" on Taratata, at the Reeperbahn Festival, Later... with Jools Holland, Late Show with David Letterman, the 31st annual Children in Need telethon, the Christmas edition of BBC One chart show Top of the Pops, Saturday Night Live and many other venues. Cee Lo also performed at the 53rd Grammy Awards on February 13, 2011, with actress Gwyneth Paltrow and several puppets provided by The Jim Henson Company. Two days later, he sang at the 2011 BRIT Awards alongside UK singer Paloma Faith. On August 14, Cee Lo sang at WWE's 2011 Summerslam pay-per-view event in Los Angeles with the addition of WWE Divas dancing to "Fuck You" at the event's venue. During CeeLo Green Presents Loberace, Green performed "Fuck You" with the animatronic band The Rock-afire Explosion. In 2022, Bruno Mars covered "Fuck You" as part of a medley with during his Bruno Mars Live (2022-2024) setlist. In the thirteenth season of The Voice of Holland, "Forget You" was covered by Culmore Bell. The live recording is featured on the album The Blind Auditions #4 (Seizoen 13), which was digitally released on 6 February 2026.

== Track listings ==
- FU
1. "FU" (Clean version) – 3:42
2. "FU" (Semi-clean version) – 3:42
- Fuck You

CD single

1. "Fuck You!" - 3:42
2. "Georgia" – 3:46

Maxi-single

1. "Fuck You!" – 3:42
2. "Forget You" – 3:42
3. "Forget You" (Le Castle Vania remix) – 4:38
4. "Georgia" – 3:46

Digital single

1. "Fuck You" – 3:42
2. "Forget You" – 3:42
3. "Fuck You" (Video) – 3:42
4. "Fuck You" (Lyric video) – 3:42

12-inch vinyl single

1. "Fuck You" – 3:42
2. "Fuck You" (Instrumental) – 3:42
- Fuck You (Heartbreaker)
1. "Fuck You (Heartbreaker)" (featuring 50 Cent) – 4:05
- Thank You
1. "Thank You" – 4:01

== Credits and personnel ==
Mixing and mastering

- Mixed at Larrabee Sound Studios, Hollywood, California; mastered at Sterling Sound, New York, New York; engineered at Levcon Studios, Hollywood, California.

Personnel

- Songwriting – CeeLo Green, Bruno Mars, Philip Lawrence, Ari Levine
- Production – The Smeezingtons (Bruno Mars, Phillip Lawrence, Ari Levine)
- Mixing – Manny Marroquin
  - Assistant – Christian Plata, Erik Madrid
- Mastering – Chris Gehringer
- Engineer – Ari Levine
- All instruments– Ari Levine, Bruno Mars, Brody Brown

Credits adapted from the liner notes of The Lady Killer, Elektra Records

== Charts and certifications ==
=== Weekly charts ===
Weekly chart performance for "Fuck You"
Chart (2010–2011)	Peak position
Australia (ARIA)	5
Austria (Ö3 Austria Top 40)	5
Belgium (Ultratop 50 Flanders)	12
Belgium (Ultratop 50 Wallonia)	27
Canada Hot 100 (Billboard)	7
Czech Republic Airplay (ČNS IFPI)	21
Denmark (Tracklisten)	2
Europe (European Hot 100 Singles)	3
France (SNEP)	86
Germany (GfK)	11
Hungary (Rádiós Top 40)	5
Ireland (IRMA)	6
Israel International Airplay (Media Forest)	2
Japan Hot 100 (Billboard)	52
Netherlands (Dutch Top 40)	1
Netherlands (Single Top 100)	3
New Zealand (Recorded Music NZ)	5
Scottish Singles Sales (Official Charts)	1
Slovakia Airplay (ČNS IFPI)	3
Sweden (Sverigetopplistan)	6
Switzerland (Schweizer Hitparade)	13
UK Singles (Official Charts)	1
UK Hip Hop/R&B (Official Charts)	1
US Billboard Hot 100	2
US Adult Contemporary (Billboard)	13
US Adult Pop Airplay (Billboard)	2
US Alternative Airplay (Billboard)	33
US Hot R&B/Hip-Hop Songs (Billboard)	57
US Pop Airplay (Billboard)	1
US Rhythmic Airplay (Billboard)	10

=== Year-end charts ===
2010 year-end chart performance for "Fuck You"
Chart (2010)	Position
Australia (ARIA)	23
Belgium (Ultratop Flanders)	79
Canada (Canadian Hot 100)	77
Denmark (Tracklisten)	40
European Hot 100 Singles	72
Germany (Media Control Charts)	97
Hungary (Mahasz)	45
Italy Airplay (EarOne)	66
Netherlands (Dutch Top 40)	31
Netherlands (Single Top 100)	39
New Zealand (Recorded Music NZ)	35
Sweden (Sverigetopplistan)	16
UK Singles (Official Charts Company)	12

2011 year-end chart performance for "Fuck You"
Chart (2011)	Position
Brazil (Crowley)	88
Canada (Canadian Hot 100)	25
Hungarian Airplay Chart	84
UK Singles (Official Charts Company)	72
US Billboard Hot 100	7
US Adult Contemporary (Billboard)	28
US Adult Top 40 (Billboard)	7
US Mainstream Top 40 (Billboard)	18

=== Decade-end charts ===
Decade-end chart performance for "Fuck You"
Chart (2010–2019)	Position
US Billboard Hot 100	95

=== Certifications ===
Certifications and sales for "Fuck You"
Region	Certification	Certified units/sales
Australia (ARIA)	3× Platinum	210,000^{^}
Austria (IFPI Austria)	Gold	15,000^{*}
Canada (Music Canada)	4× Platinum	320,000^{*}
Denmark (IFPI Danmark)	Platinum	30,000^{^}
New Zealand (RMNZ)	4× Platinum	120,000^{‡}
United Kingdom (BPI)	3× Platinum	1,800,000^{‡}
United States (RIAA)	7× Platinum	6,000,000
^{*} Sales figures based on certification alone.^{^} Shipments figures based on certification alone.^{‡} Sales+streaming figures based on certification alone.

== Release history ==
Release dates for "Fuck You"
Region	Date	Format	Label
United States	August 19, 2010	CD single	Elektra
United Kingdom	October 4, 2010	CD single	Elektra

== See also ==
- List of Dutch Top 40 number-one singles of 2010
- List of 2010s Scottish number-one singles
- List of UK R&B Chart number-one singles of 2010
- List of UK Singles Chart number ones of the 2010s
