= Estelle discography =

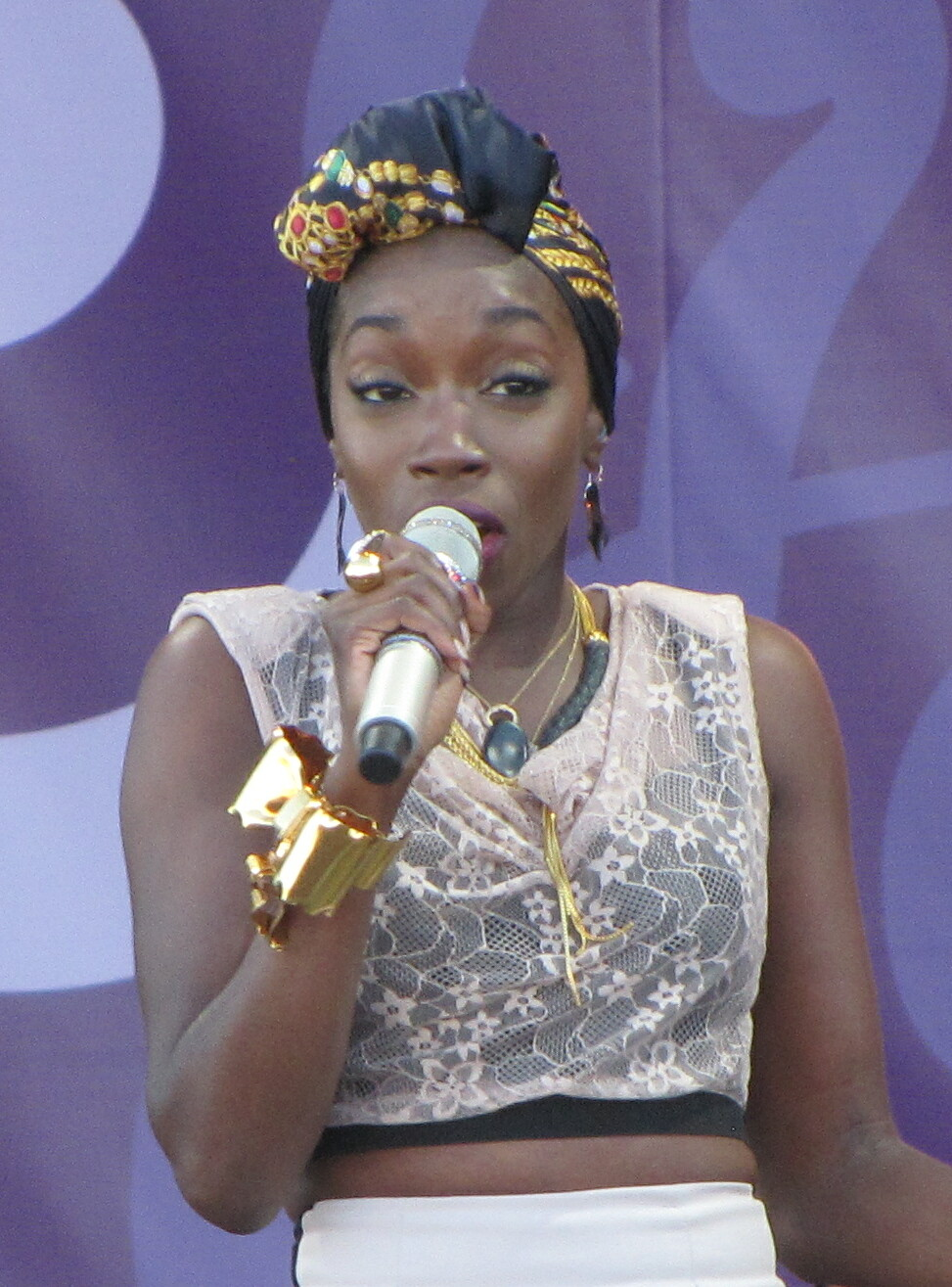
- Estelle in 2012
- Studio albums: 6
- Extended plays: 5
- Singles: 23
- Promotional singles: 6

The discography of British singer Estelle consists of six studio albums, five extended plays, twenty-three singles (including nineteen as a featured artist), and six promotional singles.

Estelle released her debut studio album The 18th Day on 18 October 2004 through V2 Records, followed by a re-release 4 April 2005. The album peaked at number 35 on the UK Albums chart. It Includes the hit singles "1980", "Free" and "Go Gone", all of which reached the Top 40 on the UK Singles Chart.

Her second studio album Shine was released on 31 March 2008 through Atlantic Records and was preceded by the lead single "Wait a Minute (Just a Touch)" in November 2007. The album's second single, "American Boy", became a number one hit in the UK, as well as reaching the top 10 and receiving platinum status in many countries. It also earned Estelle her first three Grammy Award nominations (including Song of the Year) and won Best Rap/Sung Collaboration. "American Boy" was followed by her last song to reach the Top 40 in the UK to date, "No Substitute Love, and the singles "Pretty Please (Love Me)" and "Come Over" Shine has been certified Gold in the UK, as well peaking at number 6 in the UK and becoming her first and only album to chart internationally.

Estelle followed Shine with All of Me on 28 February 2012, which featured the singles "Freak", her last song to chart in the UK, "Fall in Love", the Grammy-nominated "Thank You", and "Break My Heart", the latter two charting in the top 40 of the US Billboard Hot R&B/Hip-Hop Songs chart.

Her fourth studio album True Romance was released on 17 November 2015 through her own record label 1980 Recordings, as well as BMG. Her song "Conqueror" (originally a duet with Jussie Smollett from the American television show Empire) peaked at number 42 in the United States.

Her fifth studio album Lovers Rock was released on 7 September 2018 through 1980 Records and VP Records, making it her first album as an independent artist. The album also marked a shift in Estelle's musical style from pop, R&B, and hip hop to reggae.

== Studio albums ==
List of albums, with selected chart positions, sales, and certifications
Title	Album details	Peak chart positions										Certifications	Sales
Title	Album details	UK	AUT	FRA	GER	IRE	NLD	SWI	US	US R&B/HH	US Reggae	Certifications	Sales
The 18th Day	Released: 18 October 2004; Label: V2; Formats: CD, digital download	35	—	—	—	—	—	—	—	—	—		
Shine	Released: 31 March 2008; Label: Atlantic; Formats: CD, digital download	6	61	18	29	46	53	29	38	6	—	BPI: Gold	US: 234,000
All of Me	Released: 28 February 2012; Label: Atlantic; Formats: CD, digital download	—	—	—	—	—	—	—	28	9	—		US: 77,000
True Romance	Released: 17 February 2015; Label: 1980 Records/BMG; Formats: CD, digital download	—	—	—	—	—	—	—	—	31	—		
Lovers Rock	Released: 7 September 2018; Label: 1980 Records/VP Records; Formats: CD, digital download	—	—	—	—	—	—	—	—	— (Note: Lovers Rock did not enter the US Top R&B/Hip-Hop Albums Chart, but did chart at 18 on the R&B Album Sales Chart.)	2		
Stay Alta	Released: 23 May 2025; Label: 1980 Records/Fab Factory Entertainment; Formats: CD, digital download	—	—	—	—	—	—	—	—	—	—		
"—" denotes album that did not chart or was not released

== Extended plays ==
Title	EP details
iTunes Live: London Sessions	Released: 4 March 2008; Label: Atlantic; Formats: digital download
Estelle Live @ LiveDEMO Berlin	Released: 13 June 2008; Label: Atlantic; Formats: digital download
Love & Happiness, Vol. 1	Released: 17 June 2013; Label: 1980 Records/BMG; Formats: digital download
Love & Happiness, Vol. 2: Waiting to Exhale	Released: 26 September 2013; Label: 1980 Records/BMG; Formats: digital download
Love & Happiness, Vol. 3: How Stella Got Her Groove Back	Released: 20 February 2014; Label: 1980 Records/BMG; Formats: digital download

== Singles ==
=== As lead artist ===
List of singles, with selected chart positions, showing year released and album name
Title	Year	Peak chart positions											Certifications	Album
Title	Year	UK	AUS	AUT	CAN	GER	IRE	JPN	SWE	SWI	US	US R&B	Certifications	Album
"1980"	2004	14	36	—	—	—	—	—	36	—	—	—		The 18th Day
"Free"	2004	15	49	—	—	—	50	—	—	—	—	—		The 18th Day
"Go Gone"	2005	32	—	—	—	—	—	—	—	—	—	—		The 18th Day
"Wait a Minute (Just a Touch)" (featuring will.i.am)	2007	—	—	—	—	—	—	—	—	—	—	—		Shine
"American Boy" (featuring Kanye West)	2008	1	3	7	9	5	2	11	14	5	9	55	BPI: 5× Platinum; ARIA: Platinum; RIAA: 5× Platinum	Shine
"No Substitute Love"	2008	30	—	—	—	72	41	—	—	—	—	—		Shine
"Pretty Please (Love Me)" (featuring Cee Lo Green)	2008	103	—	—	—	—	—	—	—	—	—	—		Shine
"Come Over" (featuring Sean Paul)	2008	—	—	55	—	62	—	—	—	—	—	56		Shine
"Freak" (featuring Kardinal Offishall)	2010	103	—	—	83	—	—	—	—	—	—	—		All of Me
"Fall in Love" (featuring Nas)	2010	—	—	—	—	—	—	—	—	—	—	71		All of Me
"Break My Heart" (featuring Rick Ross)	2011	—	—	—	—	—	—	—	—	—	—	33		All of Me
"Thank You"	2011	—	—	—	—	—	—	—	—	—	100	15		All of Me
"Back to Love"	2011	—	—	—	—	—	57	—	—	—	—	—		All of Me
"Wonderful Life"	2012	—	—	—	—	—	58	—	—	—	—	— (Note: "Wonderful Life" did not enter the Hot R&B/Hip Songs chart, but peaked at number eight on the Bubbling Under R&B/Hip-Hop Songs chart.)		All of Me
"Call These Boys"	2013	—	—	—	—	—	—	—	—	—	—	—		Love & Happiness, Vol. 1: Love Jones
"Make Her Say (Beat It Up)"	2014	—	—	—	—	—	—	—	—	—	—	—		True Romance
"Conqueror" (solo or featuring Jussie Smollett)	2014	—	—	—	157	87	—	—	—	—	42	15		True Romance
"Dangerous" (with Jussie Smollett)	2017	—	—	—	—	—	—	—	—	—	—	—		Non-album single
"Woman's World"	2017	—	—	—	—	—	—	—	—	—	—	—		7-Inches for Planned Parenthood
"Love Like Ours" (featuring Tarrus Riley)	2017	—	—	—	—	—	—	—	—	—	—	—		Lovers Rock
"Better"	2018	—	—	—	—	—	—	—	—	—	—	—		Lovers Rock
"So Easy" (featuring Luke James)	2019	—	—	—	—	—	—	—	—	—	—	— (Note: "So Easy" did not enter the Hot R&B/Hip Songs chart, but peaked at number 28 on the Adult R&B Songs chart.)		Lovers Rock
"True Kinda Love" (with Zach Callison)	2019	—	—	—	—	—	—	—	—	—	—	—		Steven Universe the Movie (Original Soundtrack)
"Set Me on Fire"	2020	—	—	—	—	—	—	—	—	—	—	—		Non-album singles
"Free Me"	2023	—	—	—	—	—	—	—	—	—	—	—		Non-album singles
"Keel Over"	2024	—	—	—	—	—	—	—	—	—	—	—		Non-album singles
"Oh I"	2024	—	—	—	—	—	—	—	—	—	—	—		Stay Alta
"Fire"	2024	—	—	—	—	—	—	—	—	—	—	—		Stay Alta
"Love on Love"	2025	—	—	—	—	—	—	—	—	—	—	—		Stay Alta
"New Direction" (featuring LaRussell and Keyon Harrold)	2025	—	—	—	—	—	—	—	—	—	—	—		Stay Alta
"—" denotes single that did not chart or was not released

=== As featured artist ===
Single	Year	Peak chart positions								Album
Single	Year	UK	AUS	AUT	FRA	GER	IRE	NLD	SWI	Album
"Trixstar" (Blak Twang featuring Estelle)	2002	54	—	—	—	—	—	—	—	Kik Off
"Outspoken Part 1" (Ben Watt featuring Estelle and Baby Blak)	2005	74	—	—	—	—	—	—	—	Non-album single
"Why Go?" (Faithless featuring Estelle)	2005	49	—	—	—	—	24	—	—	Forever Faithless - The Greatest Hits
"Guilty as Charged" (Gym Class Heroes featuring Estelle)	2008	—	—	—	—	—	—	—	—	The Quilt
"World Go Round" (Busta Rhymes featuring Estelle)	2009	66	—	—	23	—	25	—	—	Back on My B.S.
"One Love" (David Guetta featuring Estelle)	2009	46	36	20	—	18	—	53	48	One Love
"Rollacoasta" (Robin Thicke featuring Estelle)	2010	—	—	—	—	—	—	—	—	Sex Therapy
"Midnight Hour" (Reflection Eternal featuring Estelle)	2010	—	—	—	—	—	—	—	—	Reflection Eternal: Revolutions Per Minute
"W Dot" (Glamma Kid featuring Estelle)	2013	—	—	—	—	—	—	—	—	Non-album singles
"The Show Begins" (Cam'ron featuring Estelle and Couzin Bang)	2014	—	—	—	—	—	—	—	—	Non-album singles
"Bright Lights" (DJ Vice featuring Estelle)	2015	—	—	—	—	—	—	—	—	Non-album singles
"The Night" (3lau and Nom De Strip featuring Estelle)	2015	—	—	—	—	—	—	—	—	Non-album singles
"She Told Me" (Nomis featuring Estelle)	2015	—	—	—	—	—	—	—	—	Non-album singles
"Everybody's Hero" (Sampa the Great featuring Estelle)	2017	—	—	—	—	—	—	—	—	HERoes Act 2
"The Plug" (Sampa the Great featuring Estelle)	2017	—	—	—	—	—	—	—	—	HERoes Act 2
"Paved with Gold" (Sampa the Great featuring Estelle)	2017	—	—	—	—	—	—	—	—	HERoes Act 2
"For Just One Day Let's Only Think About (Love)" (with Uzo Aduba, Zach Callison, Shelby Rabara, Tom Scharpling, Michaela Dietz, Deedee Magno Hall)	2018	—	—	—	—	—	—	—	—	Steven Universe: Vol. 2 (Original Soundtrack)
"We Deserve to Shine" (with Charlyne Yi, Erica Luttrell, Deedee Magno Hall, Michaela Dietz, Zach Callison, Grace Rolek and AJ Michalka)	2018	—	—	—	—	—	—	—	—	Non-album single
"Passion" (Love Device featuring Estelle)	2019	—	—	—	—	—	—	—	—	Non-album single
"Passion" (Maxi Priest featuring Estelle, Anthony Hamilton and Shaggy)	2019	—	—	—	—	—	—	—	—	It All Comes Back to Love
"Solitude" (Jay Prince featuring Estelle and Oddisee)	2025	—	—	—	—	—	—	—	—	Shine
"—" denotes single that did not chart or was not released

=== Promotional singles ===
Single	Year	Album
"Dance with Me" (Remix) (featuring Big P and Nathan)	2005	The 18th Day
"Star"	2009	Non-album single
"All Day Long (Blue Skies)"	2010	For Colored Girls: Music From and Inspired by the Original Motion Picture Soundtrack
"Benz" (with David Banner and Daley)	2011	Non-album single
"Sweet the Sound (Demo)"	2019	Non-album single
"Home (Amazon Original)"	2019	Non-album single

== Other charted songs ==
List of songs with selected chart positions, showing year released and album name
Title	Year	Peak chart positions	Album
Title	Year	KOR Int.	Album
"International (Serious)" (featuring Chris Brown and Trey Songz)	2011	55	All of Me

== Guest appearances ==
List of non-single guest appearances, with other performing artists, showing year released and album name
Title	Year	Other artist(s)	Album
"Uptown Top Rankin"	2002	Joni Rewind	—N/a
"Drop Me in the Middle"	2004	Natasha Bedingfield	Unwritten
"Nothing to Be Afraid Of"	2004	Lazyboy	Penguin Rock
"Kaysarasara"	2005	Kardinal Offishall	Fire and Glory
"Pop a Cap in Yo Ass"	2005	Ben Watt	Outspoken Part 1
"Lay It Down"	2006	Omar Lye-Fook	Sing (If You Want It)
"Life To Me"	2007	Hi-Tek	Hi-Teknology 3
"Love Hangover"	2008	Kidz in the Hall	The In Crowd
"Due Me a Favour"	2008	Kardinal Offishall	Not 4 Sale
"No Other Love"	2008	John Legend	Evolver
"Superstition"	2008	—N/a	War Child - Heroes Vol.1
"Paragraphs of Love"	2009	Ghostface Killah, Vaughn Anthony	Ghostdini: Wizard of Poetry in Emerald City
"Take Away Love"	2009	LeToya	Lady Love
"Step"	2010	Kid Sister	Ultraviolet
"Grown Man"	2010	Gucci Mane	The Appeal: Georgia's Most Wanted
"Troubled World (Part 2)"	2010	Faith Evans, Lil' Mo	Something About Faith
"Midnight Hour"	2010	Hi-Tek, Talib Kweli	Revolutions per Minute
"Chop Chop Ninja"	2011	Raekwon, Inspectah Deck	Shaolin vs. Wu-Tang
"DJ Play that Beat"	2011	Swizz Beatz	Monster Mondays Vol. 1
"Fly Girl Power!"	2011	Rapsody	Thank H.E.R. Now
"Do It Tonight"	2012	Ree-Up	Married to the Streetz
"That's The Thing"	2012	Curren$y	The Stoned Immaculate
"When I Woke Up"	2013	Consequence	Movies On Demand 4
"All About You"	2013	Funkmaster Flex, Raekwon	Who You Mad At? Me Or Yourself?
"Coming Home"	2013	Jim Jones	Vampire Life 3
"Cup of Tea"	2013	Salaam Remi	ONE: In The Chamber
"Can't Wait"	2013	Booker T. Jones	Sound the Alarm
"Where Nobody's Gone Before"	2013	Madcon	Icon
"Park Place"	2013	Bizzy Crook	84
"Let The Show Begin"	2014	Cam'ron	1st of the Month Vol. 3
"What Kinda Man"	2014	Lady Saw	Alter Ego
"The Night"	2015	3lau, Nom de Strip	Miami 2015
"I'm Home"	2015	Obie Trice	The Hangover
"Day Trippin"	2015	Kaskade	Automatic
"Cylus"	2015	Serrio, Mizztamizzo	Ravennest
"Memory Of... (US)"	2016	De La Soul	And the Anonymous Nobody...
"We are the Crystal Gems (Main Title)"	2017	Zach Callison, Deedee Magno Hall, and Michaela Dietz	Steven Universe, Vol. 1 (Original Soundtrack)
"Steven and the Crystal Gems"	2017	Zach Callison, Deedee Magno Hall, and Michaela Dietz	Steven Universe, Vol. 1 (Original Soundtrack)
"Stronger Than You"	2017	—N/a	Steven Universe, Vol. 1 (Original Soundtrack)
"We Are the Crystal Gems (Full Theme Song)"	2017	Zach Callison, Deedee Magno Hall, Michaela Dietz, Tom Scharpling	Steven Universe, Vol. 1 (Original Soundtrack)
"Peace and Love on the Planet Earth"	2017	Zach Callison, Shelby Rabara, Deedee Magno Hall, Michaela Dietz	Steven Universe, Vol. 1 (Original Soundtrack)
"Here Comes a Thought"	2017	AJ Michalka	Steven Universe, Vol. 1 (Original Soundtrack)
"Murda"	2017	Cyhi the Prynce	No Dope on Sundays
"U & I"	2017	Stokley Williams	Introducing Stokley
"Garden Shed"	2017	Tyler, the Creator	Flower Boy
"For Just One Day Let's Only Think about (Love)"	2019	Zach Callison, Deedee Magno Hall, Michaela Dietz, Tom Scharpling, Shelby Rabara, Uzo Aduba	Steven Universe, Vol. 2 (Original Soundtrack)
"Right Here"	2019	DJ Aktive, Freeway	The Tour
"Happily Ever After"	2019	Zach Callison, Deedee Magno Hall, Michaela Dietz, Tom Scharpling, Uzo Aduba, Jennifer Paz, Shelby Rabara	Steven Universe The Movie (Original Soundtrack)
"Other Friends"	2019	Sarah Stiles, Zach Callison, Michaela Dietz	Steven Universe The Movie (Original Soundtrack)
"Isn't It Love?"	2019	—N/a	Steven Universe The Movie (Original Soundtrack)
"True Kinda Love"	2019	Zach Callison	Steven Universe The Movie (Original Soundtrack)
"Finale"	2019	Zach Callison, Deedee Magno Hall, Michaela Dietz, Grace Rolek, Uzo Aduba, Jennifer Paz, Shelby Rabara, Kate Micucci, Matthew Moy, Tom Scharpling, and Toks Olagundoye	Steven Universe The Movie (Original Soundtrack)
"Oh No"	2019	Kaytranada	Bubba
"Untrapped"	2020	Yo Gotti	Untrapped
"Steven Universe Future"	2020	Zach Callison, Deedee Magno Hall, Michaela Dietz, and Shelby Rabara	Steven Universe Future (Original Soundtrack)
"Cookie Cat"	2020	Deedee Magno Hall and Michaela Dietz	Steven Universe Future (Original Soundtrack)
"We'll Be There"	2020		
We Bare Bears: The Movie (Original Soundtrack)	2020		
