= Back to Love (Estelle song) =

Single by Estelle

from the album All of Me
- Released: 4 December 2011
- Recorded: 2011
- Genre: R&B; dance-pop
- Length: 3:47
- Label: Atlantic; Homeschool
- Songwriters: Estelle Swaray; Wyclef Jean; Jerry Duplessis
- Producer: Jerry 'Wonda' Duplessis

Estelle singles chronology
"Thank You" (2011)	"Back to Love" (2011)

"Back to Love" is a song from the English R&B singer and rapper Estelle, released as the second UK single from her third studio album All of Me. It was released in the UK on 4 December 2011.

== Background ==
"Back to Love" was announced as the second UK single from All of Me on 25 October 2011. It was subsequently released on 4 December 2011, with a radio mix from Mikey J (producer for Kano, Mz Bratt, The Mitchell Brothers and Roll Deep). The music video for "Back to Love" features the original version of the song, which was produced by Jerry 'Wonda' Duplessis.

In an interview with Factory78, Estelle explained the meaning behind the song. She expressed, "Well you guys know, like I said, that I write from realness so when I'm singing "Back to Love", that's a real experience. You know, finding my way back to being happy despite having my heart broken. Despite everything going wrong in love, finding my way back to loving myself and just keeping it, what's the word? Non-spiteful, not mean, being an adult about it and loving yourself above everything else because that's number one, so that's what "Back to Love" is about."

In a further interview with Channel 4 programme Freshly Squeezed, she stated "Well, "Back To Love" is about finding your way back to loving yourself after you've been in a relationship that wasn't necessarily the right one for you but probably was necessary for your growth. That was one of the first songs I wrote off the album almost three years ago. It was from a place of like, somebody was bugging the hell out of my ex-boyfriend, my now ex-boyfriend and you know, she had been in a situation with him before and she couldn't really get why he wasn't, you know, why he was with me and why he wasn't with her and it was just a whole moment. And you know, cut to three years later, I break up with him and I had to remember who I was. You know, so it's all like different perspectives and it's all learning in progress for me."

== Critical reception ==
Nick Levine from BBC Music wrote that " the bouncy Back to Love, seems to want to rewrite Coldplay's Viva la Vida.

== Music video ==
The music video for the song and premiered on 21 October 2011 on her YouTube account. The video depicts Estelle and her former flame saying goodbye to their relationship. The couple are packing their belongings and looking through old photographs in preparation for moving out of the apartment they shared together. Though she relates that their relationship has changed and cannot be fixed, there are no hard feelings and she is ready to love someone else again.

== Promotion ==
In promotion of "Back to Love" and All of Me, Estelle was interviewed on Channel 4 programme Freshly Squeezed, which was broadcast on 5 December 2011. On 6 December 2011, she was interviewed and performed "Back to Love" on Lorraine and was also interviewed by The Official Charts Company.

== Track listing ==
Digital download

1. "Back to Love" (Mikey J Radio Mix) – 4:03
2. "Back to Love" – 3:47
3. "Back to Love" (Potential Badboy Remix) – 4:30
4. "Back to Love" (Swindle Remix) – 4:38
5. "Back to Love" (Mikey J Radio Mix Instrumental) – 4:01
- Note:

When initially released, the download bundle contained Shine album track "Back in Love" as track two instead of "Back to Love". This was an error and was later replaced by the original version of "Back to Love".

== Charts ==
Chart (2011)	Peak position
Japan Singles Chart	57

== Release history ==
Region	Date	Format(s)	Label
UK	4 December 2011	Digital download	Atlantic Records, Homeschool
