= Freak (Estelle song) =

2010 single by Estelle featuring Kardinal Offishall

Single by Estelle featuring Kardinal Offishall

from the album Step Up 3D, One More Love and All of Me
- Released: 26 February 2010
- Recorded: Gum Studios, Paris; Circle House Studios, Miami; CMS Studios, Toronto
- Genre: Electrohop; Baltimore club
- Length: 3:41 (radio edit/album version); 4:52 (extended version)
- Label: Atlantic, Homeschool
- Songwriters: Estelle Swaray; Jason Harrow; David Guetta; Nick Van De Wall; Ruben Fernhout; Beresford Romeo
- Producers: David Guetta; Afrojack

Estelle singles chronology
"One Love" (2009)	"Freak" (2010)	"Fall in Love" (2010)

Kardinal Offishall singles chronology
"Milkshakes & Razorblades" (2010)	"Freak" (2010)	"Body Bounce" (2010)

"Freak" is a single by British musician Estelle. The song, which features Canadian rapper Kardinal Offishall, was produced by French DJ David Guetta. It contains an interpolation of "Back to Life" by music group Soul II Soul in the chorus. "Freak" was featured on the soundtrack to Step Up 3D and the reissue of David Guetta's album One Love, entitled One More Love.

The single was released in North America on 26 February 2010, and in the UK on 3 May 2010 as a buzz single after the song failed to chart in the Top 100. The song was released as her third international single, after "American Boy" and "Come Over" and received positive reaction from most music critics. The song was used as one of the songs of the São Paulo Fashion Week 2010, during the parade of Colcci and in the movie Step Up 3D in 2010. "Freak" was due to be released as the first single from her third studio album All of Me but was instead included as a US bonus track.

== Reception ==
The song received a positive review from Billboard's Melanie Bertoldi. She described the song as "wilder and freakier, and ultimately appealing," she went on to comment on Offishall's verse, stating "Kardinal Offishall jumps in for a silly verse that adds to the free-form fun." She finished the review positively, stating "the song's bridge ("I wanna hear you say," she coos) serve as the cherry atop this club-worthy treat." Dirrtyinc.com gave a positive review of the song, calling it "A fun song to sing along, Estelle definitely doesn't disappointment [sic]." Nick Levine from Digital Spy rated it 4 stars and said, positively, that: "Fortunately, the track itself is almost as ear-snagging as the lyrics. Produced by David Guetta - has he had a day off in the last 12 months? - this 'Freak' is a rubbery, club-ready electro-hop tune that lifts the chorus from Soul II Soul's "Back to Life (However Do You Want Me)" and turns it into a sexual invitation. So, however do we want it? Well, however Estelle wants to give it to us, to be honest".

== Music video ==
The music video was released on Estelle's website on 26 February 2010.

=== Controversy ===
On 2 March 2010 it was reported on British entertainment website Digital Spy that Estelle's latest video had been criticised online for apparently 'blacking up'. She was accused of 'blacking up' because of her decision to wear black make-up in the "Freak" video. When asked about the decision to wear black make-up she responded in saying "I think [people] need to wait to see the clip. I could defend myself, but it's just silly. I'm black, so how do I do blackface?" She went on to compare her video to Missy Elliott's video for her 1999 single "She's a Bitch" by saying that "Missy [Elliott] did the same thing [with her video] 'She's a Bitch'."

== Track listings ==
US digital single

1. "Freak" (album version) – 3:41

US & UK "Remixes" digital EP

1. "Freak" (Riva Starr Extended Vocal Mix) – 6:16
2. "Freak" (Riva Starr Dub) – 6:17
3. "Freak" (Riva Starr Extended Instrumental) – 6:16
4. "Freak" (Michael Woods Remix) – 7:01
5. "Freak" (Plastik Funk Remix) – 5:54
6. "Freak" (Plastik Funk's Listen & Repeat Mix) – 6:24
7. "Freak" (extended version) – 4:52

== Charts ==
Chart performance for "Freak"
Chart (2010)	Peak position
Canadian Hot 100	83
German Black Chart	5
UK Singles Chart	103
UK Dance (Official Charts)	13
US Hot Dance Club Play	27

== Release history ==
Release history and format for "Freak"
Region	Date	Format	Label
United States	26 February 2010	Digital download	Atlantic, Homeschool
Canada	26 February 2010	Digital download	Atlantic, Homeschool
United Kingdom	3 May 2010	Digital download	Atlantic, Homeschool
