= Pretty Please (Love Me) =

Single by Estelle featuring Cee-Lo

from the album Shine
- Released: 15 September 2008
- Genre: R&B
- Length: 3:58 (album version); 3:09 (radio edit)
- Label: Atlantic
- Songwriters: Estelle Swaray; J. Splash; Thomas Callaway; John Stephens; Drew Dixon
- Producer: Jack Splash

Estelle singles chronology
"No Substitute Love" (2008)	"Pretty Please (Love Me)" (2008)	"Come Over" (2008)

Music video
- "Pretty Please (Love Me)" on YouTube

"Pretty Please (Love Me)" is the fourth UK-single from British hip-hop artist Estelle's second album Shine. The single features a song-writing credit, production values additional vocals by Cee-Lo Green of Gnarls Barkley. The single was released in the UK on 15 September 2008 and was added to the BBC Radio 1 playlist C-list on 13 August 2008.

The song appeared on the second volume of the Sex and the City: The Movie soundtrack as well as in the 2009 film Bride Wars. Estelle performed the song on Al Murray's Happy Hour on 19 September 2008.

== Music video ==
A music video for "Pretty Please (Love Me)" has been shot by director(s) Zipper on Butta Fly Leather and the production company Frame by Frame. The video for the song premiered on YouTube on August 18, 2008. The video for the song does not contain an appearance from guest vocalist Cee-Lo Green, however, his vocals in the song are retained. The video also includes cameo appearances from producer Jack Splash, actors Jackie Long, Taraji P. Henson and Malik Yoba, as well as Aubrey O'Day, former member of American Pop/R&B group Danity Kane.

== Track listings and formats ==
UK CD-Single

1. "Pretty Please (Love Me)" (Album Version)

UK Download-Single

1. "Pretty Please (Love Me)" (Album Version)
2. "Pretty Please (Love Me)" (Steve Mac Remix)

UK Promo CD

1. "Pretty Please (Love Me)" (Radio Edit)

UK Remix Promo CD

1. "Pretty Please (Love Me)" (Steve Mac Club Vox)
2. "Pretty Please (Love Me)" (Steve Mac Dub)
3. "Pretty Please (Love Me)" (Steve Mac Radio Edit)
4. "Pretty Please (Love Me)" (Album Version)
5. "Pretty Please (Love Me)" (Big League Remix)(No Rap Version)

== Chart ==
"Pretty Please (Love Me)" entered the UK Singles Chart at number 103, Estelle's second lowest chart position to date following "Wait a Minute (Just a Touch)" which failed to chart anywhere.

Chart (2008)	Peak position
UK R&B Chart	6
UK Singles Chart	103
