= Karl Hinds =

- Origin: Ilford, England
- Genres: Hip hop
- Occupations: Rapper, producer
- Years active: 2000–present
- Labels: Ill Flava Records
- Website: Ill Flava Records Karl Hinds on Facebook

Karl Hinds, also known as R.A.W, is a British rapper and producer, and founder of the record label Assassin Records.

== Career ==
Hinds' first single was "Roughneck Sister Sue", released in 1993 under the name of R.A.W. The track found some underground success but was not financially profitable for the label. Subsequent singles included "Cock Out & Ride" and "Feelin (Gal A Fuss)/Zero", and by the time Hinds had produced and released his fourth single, the label had been established as a drum & bass record label. Hinds subsequently released 20 singles through Assassin Records, all under different aliases.

In 2000, Hinds's record "Don Gramma" was nominated for Best Newcomer and Best Single 2001, and won the award for Best Video of the year in the UKHH Awards. Hinds then opened a sister label, Ill Flava Records, focusing on hip hop. Ill Flava released its first album in 2002, Hinds's debut LP Hindsight, which featured Blak Twang, Estelle, Wildflower, and Seanie T.

After touring the UK for two years, Hinds toured Europe in 2003 with German producer DJ Dynamite. In 2004, he released his second album Have Patience, from which the most successful single was "Lets Av It" featuring Skinnyman.

== Awards ==
- UKHH Awards
  - 2001, Best Hip Hop Video - "Don Gramma" (Winner)
  - 2001, Best Single - "Don Gramma" (Nominated)
  - 2001, Best Newcomer - Karl Hinds (Nominated)
  - 2003, Best Single - "Get To Know Me" (Nominated)

== Discography ==
Album
Hindsight (2002)
- Singles: "Don Gramma", "The Next", "Get to Know Me"
Have Patience (2004)
- Singles: "Lets Av It" (featuring Skinnyman), "You Done Know"
The Need to Be Heard (2010)

== Videography ==
Information
Don Gramma (2001), directed by The Heretic
Get to Know Me (Remix) (2003), directed by The Heretic
Lets Av It (featuring Skinnyman) (2004), directed by Luke Biggins
Life (Serocee) (2006), directed by Luke Biggins
