= Lovers Rock (Estelle album) =

Studio album by Estelle
- Released: 7 September 2018
- Genre: Reggae; lovers rock
- Length: 44:45
- Label: VP; Established 1980

Estelle chronology
True Romance (2015)	Lovers Rock (2018)	Stay Alta (2025)

Singles from Lovers Rock
- 1. "Love Like Ours" Released: 16 June 2017; 2. "Better" Released: 13 July 2018; 3. "So Easy" Released: February 2019

Lovers Rock is the fifth studio album by British rapper and singer Estelle. The album was released on 7 September 2018 by Established 1980 Records. The album was supported by the singles "Love Like Ours", which features Jamaican singer Tarrus Riley, and "Better".

== Background ==
Whilst speaking about the album, Estelle commented that fans had been consistently asking when she would make an entire reggae album since the release of her single "Come Over" featuring Sean Paul, which is taken from her second album, Shine (2008).

== Track listing ==
Lovers Rock track listing
No.	Title	Writer(s)	Producer(s)	Length
1.	"So Easy" (featuring Luke James)	Estelle Swaray; Luke James	Jerry "Wonda" Duplessis	3:59
2.	"Meet Up" (featuring Maleek Berry)	Swaray; Maleek Berry; Akil "Fresh" King; Kyle "KO" Owens; Taranchyla, Mitchum "Khan" Chin	Dwayne "Supa Dups" Chin-Quee; Mitchum Khan Chin^{[a]}	2:38
3.	"Really Want" (featuring Konshens and Nick X Navi)	Swaray; Konshens; Nick X Navi; Taranchyla	Supa Dups	2:46
4.	"Better"	Swaray; Ryan Toby; Varren Wade; Edgar "JV" Etienne	Harmony Samuels	3:19
5.	"Don't Wanna" (featuring Kranium)	Swaray; Kranium; King; Owens	Ricky Blaze	3:09
6.	"Queen" (featuring Chronixx)	Swaray; Chronixx	Jerren "J-Kits" Spruill; Chris Cornwell	3:37
7.	"Slow Down" (featuring Alicai Harley)		Sharif "Reefa" Slater; Arturo Hill; ^{[a]}	3:31
8.	"Ain't Yo Bitch"	Swaray; Kadis	Kadis	4:09
9.	"Sweetly"	Swaray; Ursula Yancy; King; Owens	Phillip "DJ Hardwerk" Constable	3:15
10.	"Karma" (featuring HoodCelebrityy)	Swaray; King; Owens	Sharif "Reefa" Slater; Muddigold; 12 Keyz^{[a]}	4:06
11.	"Lights Out"	Swaray; Tish Hyman	Andre "Dre" Harris	3:23
12.	"Love Like Ours" (featuring Tarrus Riley)	Swaray; Tarrus Riley; Mitchum "Khan" Chin	Supa Dups	3:55
13.	"One More Time"	Swaray; Kristal "Tytewriter" Oliver	Harris	3:24
14.	"Good for Us"	Swaray; Taranchyla; Mitchum "Khan" Chin	Supa Dups; Mitchum "Khan" Chin^{[a]}	3:05
Total length:				44:45

Notes

- ^[a] indicates a co-producer
- "Slow Down" is only included on digital and streaming versions of the album

== Charts ==
Chart performance for Lovers Rock
Chart (2018)	Peak position
US Reggae Albums (Billboard)	2
