= Kik Off =

Studio album by Blak Twang
- Released: 2002
- Genre: British hip hop
- Label: Bad Magic/Wall of Sound MAGICD5 / MAGICLP5
- Producer: Tony Rotton, Harry Love

Blak Twang chronology
19 Long Time (1998)	Kik Off (2002)	The Rotton Club (2005)

Kik Off is the third album by British hip-hop artist Blak Twang, released in 2002 on the Bad Magic imprint of Wall of Sound Records.

The album was mostly produced by Tony Rotton, with two tracks produced by DJ Dynamite and one by Harry Love. Guest appearances come from singer Est'elle and Jahmali, from rappers Mystro, Rodney P, Karl Hinds and Seanie T, and from then-Radio 1 DJ Lisa I'Anson, whose narration on "Dirty Stopout Uncovered" alludes to her role as narrator on the TV documentary series Ibiza Uncovered.

The tracks "Kik Off", "Trixstar", and "So Rotton" were released as singles. The video for the first single, "Kik Off", was the first music video directed by graffiti artist Banksy, who also designed the album's artwork.

Rotton cited extensive touring experience in the UK and Europe and the birth of his second child as influences on the album.

== Track listing ==
All tracks produced by Tony Rotton, except where noted.

1. "Warm Up/Intro" – 3:21
2. "Kik Off" – 4:22
  - Scratches by Big Ted
3. "On Line" – 3:55
  - Scratches by Harry Love
  - Produced by Harry Love
4. "Trixstar" – 4:34
  - Featuring Est'elle
5. "So Rotton" – 4:54
  - Featuring Jahmali
6. "Sum Ah Dem" – 4:45
  - Produced by DJ Dynamite
7. "Fire Power" – 4:30
8. "Half 'N' Half" – 4:24
  - Featuring Mystro
9. "Vow" – 4:15
10. "Dirty Stopout Uncovered" – 3:30
  - Featuring Rodney P & Lisa I'Anson
  - Produced by DJ Dynamite
11. "Ain't Done 2 Bad" – 5:36
  - Intro vocals by 'Ard Bastard
12. "It's Happening in England" – 4:17
  - Featuring Karl Hinds & Seanie T
13. "Blood and Fire" – 4:36
14. "Post Match Analysis" – 1:06
15. "Publik Order" – 10:10
  - Includes hidden track

== Personnel ==
=== Performance ===
- Tony "Blak Twang" Olabode – rapping
- Lisa I'Anson – narration
- Mystro – rapping
- Karl Hinds – rapping
- Seanie T – rapping

=== Production ===
- Tony "Blak Twang" Olabode – production
- Banksy – artwork
- DJ Dynamite – production
- Harry Love – production
- Mrs. Jones – styling
- Steve Lazarides – photography
