= Chug Jug With You =

"Chug Jug With You (Number One Victory Royale)"

Single by Leviathan
- Released: 8 November 2018
- Recorded: 2018
- Genre: Parody, R&B
- Length: 3:21
- Label: Soulspazm Records
- Songwriters: CMSkits; Leviathan; William Adams; Estelle Swaray; John Stephens; Kanye West; Ethan Hendrickson; Josh Lopez; Caleb Speir; Keith Harris

"Chug Jug With You" is a parody song by Leviathan, with lyrics written by both CMSkits and Leviathan. Released in 2018, the song is a parody of "American Boy" by Estelle and Kanye West. The song features lyrics about the video game Fortnite and was originally uploaded as a 17-second short to social media by CMSkits. After some development, Leviathan released a full length version on 8 November 2018 to SoundCloud, after which the song went viral on TikTok and YouTube.

== Background and release ==
=== Development ===
CMSkits originally uploaded a video to Instagram titled "Let's Play Fortnite!!!!" as a parody of the 2008 track "American Boy" by Estelle and Kanye West. The video was viewed eighty thousand times, however did not become a viral phenomenon. The original video was only 17 seconds in length, with visuals of a teenager dancing in front of green-screened still images taken from Fortnite. Speaking to Know Your Meme, Leviathan explained that he was songwriting whilst in a call with friends, using the website RhymeZone, an online rhyming dictionary, along with the Fortnite wiki. He was 13 years old at the time. Well-known destinations were taken from the game to create intentionally bad lyrics, sung with a satire-falsetto. The lyrics are sung awkwardly, often not in time with the song metre, the intention being for the song to sound as though an actual child has both written and is singing the lyrics.

=== Release and virality ===
"Chug Jug With You" was released on SoundCloud on 8 November 2018, receiving over 400,000 views by 2019. The song became a viral sensation, with TikTokers using sections of the song to create their own videos. A version by Fairybloobs received over 4.8 million views, more than the YouTube video version, with a quote from the video saying "I just know this kids mom is an English teacher bc [sic] this pronunciation is godly." This was said whilst performing a head bop to the music. Reactions to the song by YouTubers Ethan Klein and GeorgeNotFound contributed to its popularity, with each of their videos respectively receiving millions of views and interactions. Leviathan expected the song to become a dance phenomenon, citing The Gregory Brothers as an inspiration, who later recreated the song and released different remixes. A vocaloid version was later released making use of Hatsune Miku. This version of the song received 6.6 million views on YouTube.

== Reception and commentary ==
The song received coverage from both news outlets and inclusion in printed media. Kotaku writer Riley MacLeod, whilst attempting to learn how to play the song on guitar, made note of how "Chug Jug With You" had been duetted with the likes of John Mayer on TikTok, and said "there’s so much crammed into the song—too many Fortnite landmarks, too many words in general—that almost anything could remind you of it at any time." Palmer Haasch of Business Insider attributed the songs TikTok popularity to the instrumentation and implementation, saying that the song "totally slaps." A 2022 book explained how a DIY video created by Khabane Lame, filmed using a point-of-view shot of a persons hands chopping up fruit such as a banana, featured "Chug Jug With You" as the background music. Sivas Cumhuriyet University conducted a study into deepfake videos in 2022, highlighting a deepfake of then US President Joe Biden singing "Chug Jug With You" in front of the US Senate. The study emphasised the danger of deepfakes and their ability to be abused to manipulate events.

== Legacy ==
In 2023, a silent video released by the official Fortnite TikTok account featured an emote of a character duo consuming a 'Chug Jug' together, before switching to a camera shot of a player stood on top of 'Tomato Temple'. The video included captions saying, "someone throw a nice track over this!" and "if only we had a good song for this video, any suggestions?". Fans subsequently speculated that "Chug Jug With You" could become an emote or lobby track in-game.

Leviathan performed at the 2024 Streamer Awards, which received negative reception from fans due to the use of the word "gay" as an insult. Shortly after the event ended, Leviathan responded on Twitter defending his music as satire and stating that he did not even play Fortnite before writing the songs.

=== Future ===
Leviathan discussed the possibility of future music, but acknowledged that the inauthenticity of his singing voice may not have the same "charm".
