= Go Gone =

2005 single by Estelle

Single by Estelle

from the album The 18th Day
- Released: 28 March 2005
- Recorded: 2004
- Length: 3:33
- Label: V2; Stellarents Entertainment; JDid
- Songwriter(s): Estelle Swaray; Colin Emmanuel
- Producer(s): Mike Peden (single version)

Estelle singles chronology
"Free" (2004)	"Go Gone" (2005)	"Wait a Minute (Just a Touch)" (2007)

Alternative cover
- UK CD 2 single cover

"Go Gone" is a song by British singer-songwriter Estelle and was the third and final single from her debut album, The 18th Day (2004). "Go Gone" was remixed by Lenny Kravitz's band in Los Angeles for single release. The 18th Day was subsequently re-released with the single remix replacing the original and previous B-side "Freedom" added to the track listing.

"Go Gone" was released on 28 March 2005 and underperformed in comparison to previous singles "1980" and "Free", peaking at number 32 on the UK Singles Chart and remaining in the top 75 for three weeks.

== Music video ==
The music video for "Go Gone" was inspired by Tina Turner and featured an appearance by British presenter and comedian Mark Lamarr, who introduced Estelle at the beginning of the video. The video was featured on the maxi CD single of "Go Gone".

== Track listings ==
UK CD1

1. "Go Gone" (single version)
2. "Go Gone" (EB Get Down remix)

UK CD2

1. "Go Gone" (single version)
2. "Go Gone" (Rough Diamond remix)
3. "Go Gone" (Soul Central remix)
4. "Go Gone" (EB Get Down remix)
5. "Go Gone" (video)

UK 12-inch vinyl

Side A

1. "Go Gone" (single version)
2. "Go Gone" (EB Get Down remix)

Side B

1. "Go Gone" (Soul Central remix)
2. "Go Gone" (Rough Diamond remix)

== Charts ==
Chart (2005)	Peak position
Scotland (OCC)	41
UK Singles (OCC)	32
UK Indie (OCC)	7
UK Hip Hop/R&B (OCC)	12
