= No Substitute Love =

Single by Estelle

from the album Shine
- B-side: "Magnificent"
- Released: 30 June 2008 (UK); 5 September 2008 (Europe); 6 September 2008 (Australia)
- Genre: R&B; hip hop; reggae fusion
- Length: 3:33
- Label: Atlantic
- Songwriter(s): Estelle Swaray, John Stephens, Wyclef Jean, George Michael, Lindon Roberts
- Producer(s): Wyclef Jean, Jerry "Wonda" Duplessis

Estelle singles chronology
"American Boy" (2008)	"No Substitute Love" (2008)	"Pretty Please (Love Me)" (2008)

"No Substitute Love" is the third single from British hip-hop artist Estelle's second album Shine. The song is an improvised cover of both Reggae performer Half Pint's "Substitute Lover" and George Michael's "Faith". The song is her second international single in Europe.

== Music video ==
The music video was released to TV music channels in the UK on 30 May. It features a cameo from Kelly Rowland, America's Next Top Model Cycle 2 contestant Sara Racey-Tabrizi, Kardinal Offishall, Amanda Diva, and Project Runway Season 4 winner Christian Siriano. The video was directed by Jake McAfee.

== Track listings and formats ==
UK CD 1

1. "No Substitute Love"

UK CD 2

1. "No Substitute Love"
2. "Magnificent"
3. "No Substitute Love (Wideboys Miami mix radio edit)
4. "No Substitute Love" (video)

Australian CD single

1. "No Substitute Love"
2. "No Substitute Love" (Wideboys Miama Mix)
3. "No Substitute Love" (Treasure Fingers Mix)

== Charts ==
Chart (2008)	Peak position
Belgium (Ultratip Bubbling Under Flanders)	10
Belgium (Ultratip Bubbling Under Wallonia)	8
UK Singles (OCC)	30
