= Conqueror (Estelle song) =

Single by Estelle

from the album True Romance
- Released: 22 July 2014
- Recorded: 2014
- Length: 4:27
- Label: Established 1980 Records; BMG
- Songwriters: Estelle Swaray; Claude Kelly; Angel Higgs; Jaramye Daniels; Akil C. King; Kyle Henry; Bailey Owens
- Producers: Reefa; Johnny Black

Estelle singles chronology
"Make Her Say (Beat It Up)" (2014)	"Conqueror" (2014)	"Something Good" (2015)

"Conqueror" is a song by British singer Estelle from her fourth studio album, True Romance (2015). The song was released as a single on 22 July 2014 by 1980 Records and BMG. The track was written by Estelle, Claude Kelly, Angel Higgs, Jaramye Daniels, Akil C. King, Kyle Henry, and Bailey Owens. The song was produced by Reefa and Johnny Black. "Conqueror" was featured in the 2014 film Addicted. A version of the song was recorded alongside Jussie Smollett for the 2015 TV series Empire.

== Charts ==
Empire version

Chart (2014)	Peak position
France (SNEP)	157
Germany (GfK)	87
Portugal Digital Song Sales (Billboard)	3
US Billboard Hot 100	42
US Hot R&B/Hip-Hop Songs (Billboard)	15
