= All of Me (Estelle album) =

Studio album by Estelle
- Released: 24 February 2012
- Genres: Hip hop; R&B
- Length: 41:42
- Labels: Warner Music; Atlantic; Homeschool
- Producers: Don Cannon; Jerry "Wonder" Duplessis; Carvin & Ivan; Ne-Yo; Wizzy Wow

Estelle chronology
| Shine (2008) | All of Me (2012) | True Romance (2015) |

Singles from All of Me
- 1. "Break My Heart" Released: 26 April 2011; 2. "Thank You" Released: 4 October 2011; 3. "Back to Love" Released: 4 December 2011; 4. "Wonderful Life" Released: 14 February 2012

All of Me is the third studio album by British rapper and singer Estelle. It was first released on 24 February 2012 in Ireland, 28 February in the United States and 12 March in the United Kingdom.

== Background ==
Estelle confirmed her third album would be entitled All of Me in 2009. The album was originally led by the single "Freak" featuring Kardinal Offishall and produced by David Guetta. The video premiered on her website on 26 February 2010. The original second single from the album was announced as being "Fall in Love", which featured versions featuring Nas and John Legend. Due to the underperformance of both "Freak" and "Fall in Love", both songs were ultimately left off the final track listing for All of Me. However, "Freak" was featured on both the Step Up 3D soundtrack and the reissue of David Guetta's album One Love, entitled One More Love. In the US, both "Freak" and "Fall in Love" featured on the iTunes digital deluxe edition of the album.

In 2011, it was announced that "Break My Heart", featuring Rick Ross would be released as the new lead single from All of Me. It was released on 26 April 2011 and sent to US urban radio stations on 17 May 2011. The song peaked at number 33 on the U.S. Hip-Hop/R&B, the week of 2 July 2011. The following week the song rose to 37. Dual second singles were released in the US and UK. In the US, the second single was announced as being "Thank You" whereas "Back to Love" (not to be confused with "Back in Love" from Shine) was issued in the UK. "Wonderful Life" was released as the third single from the album in the United States on 14 February 2012.

== Composition ==
The series of skits that weave through All of Me involve a loose, wide-ranging conversation among several friends about relationships, education, family, careers and more. According to Jon Caramanica from The New York Times, "even with the light soul-jazz in the background (produced in part by Questlove of The Roots), they have the feeling of intimate home recordings, modest and almost accidental."

Estelle said that she wrote "Wonderful Life", in part, to help her appreciate her lot when she got sick of performing "American Boy". "Speak Ya Mind" is a self-affirming boom-bap, while "Break My Heart" featuring Rick Ross and produced by Don Cannon, is a modern hip-hop soul. On the song, Ross glides smoothly over the beat, while Estelle sings about how she's unsure about committing to a new man because she just got out of a relationship and doesn't want to get hurt again. "I just wanna love you baby, I don't wanna waste no time," she sings. "I wanna be your only one baby, please don't break my heart." The song "International (Serious)" featuring Chris Brown and Trey Songz is about Estelle's living the life as an international jet-setter. The clunky, apocalyptic track finds her dipping into patois, while the guests Brown and Songz get to dabble in rapping. "Cold Crush" is a slice of 1983-style R&B, all drum-machine snares and synthetic guitars.

She bounces back-and-forth from rapping and singing on "Speak Ya Mind" and "The Life", informing listeners that she hasn't missed a step since her last album a few years ago. "Speak Ya Mind" finds Estelle singing "I just want them to pull out 'The Miseducation' again," referring to Lauryn Hill's debut album. All of Me also includes a funky Janelle Monáe collaboration called "Do My Thang" and the bouncy "Back to Love". The fast-paced track "Do My Thang", which is an ode to individuality and uniqueness, also works as a girl power anthem, with each singer strongly declaring her independence: "You don't know where I'm going and so you think I'm lost, I ain't on your page, okay, so to you that means I'm off," Estelle sings, before Janelle chimes in with the line: "When I dance, I dance to the beat of a drummer you don't hear and can't see ... the problem must be you, and not me." "Wonderful Life" is a positive jam, as Estelle sings about trying to find the simple pleasures of life during a rocky day.

== Singles ==
"Break My Heart" was released as the lead single from All of Me, featuring American rapper Rick Ross. It was released on 26 April 2011 and sent to US urban radio stations on 17 May 2011. The video was shot in L.A, Malibu and was directed by Iren Brown. The song peaked at 33 on U.S. Billboard Hot R&B/Hip-Hop Songs.

"Thank You" was released as the second single from the album. The R&B ballad was written by the American hip-hop singer Akon and was produced by Jerry Wonda. It was released in the United States on 4 October 2011. The music video for the song was directed by Iren Sheffield and premiered on 18 January 2012 on her YouTube account. The video tells a story of love lost. It has charted on the Billboard's Hot R&B/Hip-Hop Songs and it's already her most successful single on the R&B chart. It also debuted at number 100 on the Billboard Hot 100.

"Back to Love" was released as the second UK single from her third studio album All of Me. It was released in the UK on 4 December 2011. The music video for the song and premiered on 21 October 2011 on her YouTube account. The video depicts Estelle and her former flame saying goodbye to their relationship. The couple are packing their belongings and looking through old photographs in preparation for moving out of the apartment they shared together. Though she relates that their relationship has changed and cannot be fixed, there are no hard feelings and she is ready to love someone else again.

"Wonderful Life" was released as the third single from the album in the United States on 14 February 2012. It peaked at number 58 on the Japan Hot 100.

== Critical reception ==
Professional ratings
Aggregate scores
| Source | Rating |
|---|---|
| Metacritic | 67/100 |
Review scores
| Source | Rating |
| About.com | 3.5/5 stars |
| AllMusic | 3/5 stars |
| Entertainment Weekly | B+ |
| The Guardian | 3/5 stars |
| Los Angeles Times | 3/4 stars |
| Paste Magazine | 6.9/10 |
| Pitchfork | 7/10 |
| Rolling Stone | 3.5/5 stars |
| USA Today | 3.5/4 stars |

The album received mostly positive reviews from music critics. At Metacritic, which assigns a normalised rating out of 100 given to reviews from mainstream critics, the album received an average score of 67, based on 17 reviews, which indicates "generally favorable reviews". Ray Rahman from Entertainment Weekly gave to the album a "B+" rating. He found that All of Me has "feel-good soul-pop, melodic grrrl-power rhymes, and lush love songs that make even gruff guest Rick Ross sound like a romantic." Another positive came from Associated Press editor Jonathan Landrum, who called the album "a solid piece of work, and she proves that her "all" is more than enough". Margaret Wappler from the Los Angeles Times gave to the album 3 out of 5 stars, stating that "By the fourth track, Estelle sounds like Lily Allen at her most docile. But the real model for 'All of Me' isn't her fellow Londoner; it's Lauryn Hill, who married soul, dance hall-laced hip-hop and the most doo-wop strains of R&B on her landmark 1998 album. Estelle can trade in any of these formats too but she's not as rawly charismatic as Hill."

Jon Dolan from Rolling Stone gave to the album 3.5 out of 5 stars, and wrote that "Co-writer John Legend and guests like Rick Ross and Janelle Monáe help Estelle construct a multifaceted album – from the resilient post-breakup neo-soul of "Thank You" to the self-affirming boom-bap of "Speak Ya Mind". Elysa Gardner from USA Today was largely positive, giving to the album 3.5 out of 4 stars, writing that the album " is full of catchy melodies, effervescent grooves and positive (but not preachy) messages, all delivered in a sunny, fluid voice that assures us that spring is just around the corner, literally and figuratively." Mark Edward Nero from About.com wrote that the album "is a smart, energetic collection of songs, mostly revolving around love and relationships. Although her new album doesn't quite have the eclectic, international flavour that made her last album so great, it's still a solid, enjoyable listen." AllMusic's Andy Kellman gave to the album 3 stars out of possible 5, writing that "the appearances from Chris Brown and Trey Songz may qualify as the least necessary collaborations of 2012" and that Do My Thing "won't get nearly as much attention." A mixed review came from BBC Music editor Nick Levine, who thought that "The lack of standout hits here is disappointing, but All of Me's Achilles heel is its conversational interludes. They're not just dated and gratuitous, but also a knock-off from another record." Jon Caramanica wrote a mixed review for The New York Times, analysing that the album did not "shows Estelle's true potential" and that it " finds Estelle trying on familiar poses, or unfamiliar ones that vex."

== Commercial performance ==
All of Me debuted at number twenty-eight, becoming her best debut on the US Billboard 200 chart, with her previous album Shine debuting at number thirty-eight. It sold 15,200 copies in the first week. The album has sold 77,000 copies in the US as of February 2015.

== Track listing ==
All of Me track listing
| No. | Title | Writer(s) | Producer(s) | Length |
|---|---|---|---|---|
| 1. | "The Life" | Ivan Barias; Christopher Barnes; Curt Chambers; Carvin Haggins; Isra Lohata; Estelle Swaray | Carvin & Ivan; Wizzy Wow | 3:28 |
| 2. | "International (Serious)" (featuring Chris Brown and Trey Songz) | David Banner; Chris Brown; Tremaine Neverson; Sevyn Streeter; Swaray | Banner; THX^{[a]} | 3:56 |
| 3. | "You and I" | Ray Angry; Ahmir Thompson; Keith Harris | Questlove; Angry | 0:38 |
| 4. | "Love the Way We Used To" | Sean Marshall; Gary "Kadis" Spriggs; Swaray | Kadis & Sean; Marshall^{[b]} | 3:33 |
| 5. | "Cold Crush" | Matthew Bronson; Mischa Chillak; John Stephens; Swaray | Book & Bronze; Marshall^{[b]} | 3:18 |
| 6. | "Don't Break It" | Angry; Thompson; Harris | Questlove; Angry | 1:17 |
| 7. | "Break My Heart" (featuring Rick Ross) | Don Cannon; Vincent Montana, Jr.; William Roberts; Stephens; Swaray | Cannon; Estelle^{[b]} | 4:17 |
| 8. | "Thank You" | Arden Altino; Akene Dunkley; Jerry Duplessis; Doug F. Edwards; Thomas D. Richardson; Aliaune Thiam | Duplessis; Altino^{[a]}; Dunkley^{[a]} | 4:12 |
| 9. | "Who We Are" | Angry; Thompson | Questlove; Angry | 1:02 |
| 10. | "Wonderful Life" | Altino; Duplessis; James Poyser; Jeymes Samuel; Swaray | Duplessis; Samuel; Altino^{[a]}; Poyser^{[a]} | 3:32 |
| 11. | "Found My Way..." | Angry; Thompson | Questlove; Angry | 0:26 |
| 12. | "Back to Love" | Duplessis; Wyclef Jean; Swaray | Duplessis; Jean | 3:47 |
| 13. | "Blue Skies" | Angry; Thompson | Questlove; Angry | 0:20 |
| 14. | "Speak Ya Mind" | Stacy Barthe; George Clinton; Bootsy Collins; Corey Gibson; Swaray | Tha Bizness; Estelle^{[b]} | 4:28 |
| 15. | "Do My Thing" (featuring Janelle Monáe) | Tyler Reynolds; Shaffer Smith; Miykal Snoddy; Warren Zavala | Ne-Yo; Reynolds; Zavala; Snoddy | 3:28 |
| Total length: | | | | 41:42 |

Deluxe edition bonus tracks
| No. | Title | Writer(s) | Producer(s) | Length |
|---|---|---|---|---|
| 16. | "All Day Long (Blue Skies)" | Avriele Crandle; Irving Berlin; Swaray | Crandle | 3:45 |
| 17. | "Fall in Love" (featuring John Legend and Nas) | Swaray; Nasir Jones; Stephens; Tiyon "TC" Mack; Le'Che Martin; Chad "C-Note" Roper | DJ Frank E | 3:48 |
| 18. | "Freak" (featuring Kardinal Offishall) | Swaray; Jason Harrow; David Guetta; Nick Van De Wall; Ruben Fernhout; Beresford Romeo | Guetta; Afrojack | 3:41 |
| 19. | "Thank You" (music video) | | | 4:47 |

Notes

- ^{^[a]} indicates co-producer(s)
- ^{^[b]} indicates vocal producer(s)

Sample credits

- "Don't Break It" contains samples from "Warp Factor II" as written by Vincent Montana.
- "Thank You" contains portions of "Wildflower" as performed by Original Source.
- "Speak Ya Mind" contains an interpolation of "Freak like Me" as performed by Adina Howard.

== Charts ==
=== Weekly charts ===
Weekly chart performance for All of Me
| Chart (2012) | Peak position |
|---|---|
| Australian Hitseekers Albums (ARIA) | 20 |
| US Billboard 200 | 28 |
| US Top R&B/Hip-Hop Albums (Billboard) | 9 |

=== Year-end charts ===
Year-end chart performance for All of Me
| Chart (2012) | Position |
|---|---|
| US Top R&B/Hip-Hop Albums (Billboard) | 77 |

== Release history ==
Release history for All of Me
| Region | Date | Format(s) | Label | Ref. |
|---|---|---|---|---|
| Ireland | 24 February 2012 | CD; digital download | Warner Records; Atlantic Records | |
| United States | 28 February 2012 | CD; digital download | Warner Records; Atlantic Records | |
| United Kingdom | 12 March 2012 | CD; digital download | Warner Records; Atlantic Records | |
