= Break My Heart (Estelle song) =

Single by Estelle featuring Rick Ross

from the album All of Me
- Released: 26 April 2011
- Genre: R&B; hip hop
- Length: 3:57 (album version)
- Label: Atlantic
- Songwriters: Estelle Swaray; William Roberts II; Donald Cannon; Vincent Montana, Jr.; John Stephens
- Producer: Don Cannon

Estelle singles chronology
"Fall in Love" (2010)	"Break My Heart" (2011)	"Thank You" (2011)

"Break My Heart" is first single taken from Estelle's third studio album All of Me, featuring American rapper Rick Ross. It was released on 26 April 2011.

== Background ==
The lead single from her third album All of Me, "Break My Heart" is a breezy mid-tempo tune and was produced by Don Cannon and features a verse from Miami, Florida-based rapper Rick Ross. Two remixes were released, one containing Swizz Beatz, Raekwon and Wretch 32 for the UK market, and a second featuring a rap verse from British songstress, along with Busta Rhymes and Jadakiss for the US. Estelle began her career as a rapper and she told The Boombox she had no problem returning to her hip-hop roots. "I started as a rapper, my first album was damn near all rap, so people know me as a rapper from home," she said. "This wasn't scary, I enjoyed rapping again. I felt like I needed to spit some bars."

== Critical reception ==
Jonathan Landum from Associated Press wrote that on the album's lead single "the singer struggles with her trust issues on the midtempo, radio-friendly track." Margaret Wappler from Los Angeles Times wrote that Estelle "somehow manages to make king pimp Rick Ross sound like a romantic." Jon Dolan from Rolling Stone considered the track "gingerly hopeful" and said that "it's her kind of realness, conversational and smooth just the same."

== Music video ==
The video was shot in Malibu, California and was directed by Iren Brown. Estelle said "The basic concept is I’m rolling up to this house and I’m having a dinner party, but I invited this guy that I’m trying to get it on with," explained the British songstress, who models a variety of chic looks. "And the entire time I’m thinking about him, but in my heart I’m doubting, maybe he’ll break my heart. I pray he doesn’t break my heart."

== Remixes ==
The official remix has two parts. Part 1 of the remix featuring rappers Swizz Beatz, Jadakiss, & Busta Rhymes was released on 30 August 2011. It samples Zhané's "Sending My Love".

Part 2 of the remix featuring rappers Swizz Beatz, Raekwon, & Wretch 32 was released on 9 September 2011.

== Charts ==
Chart (2011)	Peak position
South Korea International (Circle)	42
US Hot R&B/Hip-Hop Songs (Billboard)	33
