= True Romance (Estelle album) =

Studio album by Estelle
- Released: 17 February 2015
- Recorded: 2013–2014
- Genre: R&B
- Length: 44:55
- Label: Established 1980 Records
- Producers: Kibwe "12Keyz" Luke, Best Kept Secret, Darhyl "Hey DJ" Camper Jr., D. Smith, Ivan Barias, Josiah Bell, J.U.S.T.I.C.E. League, Johnny Black, Keith Harris, Myles William, Sharif "Reefa" Slater, Soundwavve

Estelle chronology
All of Me (2012)	True Romance (2015)	Lovers Rock (2018)

Singles from True Romance
- 1. "Make Her Say (Beat It Up)" Released: 17 February 2014; 2. "Conqueror" Released: 22 July 2014

True Romance is the fourth studio album by British rapper and singer Estelle. The album was released on 17 February 2015 by Established 1980 Records. The album was supported by the singles "Make Her Say (Beat It Up)" and "Conqueror".

The album's sleeve was designed by Rebecca Sugar, creator of the animated series Steven Universe in which Estelle provided the voice of the character Garnet.

== Singles ==
The first single, "Make Her Say (Beat It Up)", was released on 18 February 2014. On 15 April 2014, the music video was released with a clean version of the song.

The album's second single "Conqueror" was released on 22 July 2014. The track was featured in the 2014 film Addicted. A version of the song was recorded alongside Jussie Smollett for the 2015 TV series Empire, refuelling sales of the single (peaking at No. 42 on the Billboard Hot 100 and No. 15 on R&B) and making it her biggest US hit since her Grammy-winning "American Boy". On 21 July 2014, the music video was released.

== Critical reception ==
Professional ratings
Aggregate scores
Source	Rating
Metacritic	64/100
Review scores
Source	Rating
AllMusic	3/5 stars
Consequence of Sound	C−
New York Daily News	3/5 stars
Pitchfork Media	6.9/10
Rolling Stone	3/5 stars
Slant Magazine	3.5/5 stars

True Romance received generally positive reviews from music critics. At Metacritic, which assigns a normalized rating out of 100 to reviews from critics, the album received an average score of 64, which indicates "generally favorable reviews", based on 9 reviews. Andy Kellman of AllMusic said, "Patched together and seemingly out-of-character as it is, the singer's fourth album does have more going for it than her third one did." Pat Levy of Consequence of Sound said, "With her fourth album, British singer/rapper Estelle postures as a Beyoncé-type figure and fails to achieve comparable results. Clunky songwriting and mediocre lyrics sink an album full of strong production choices and prove that Estelle is unlikely to claim anything more than a spot as the JV Bey. True Romance isn’t going to help Estelle’s quest to remove herself from the one-hit wonder category (and “American Boy” sure was a hit). In all likelihood, it will further separate her from the pop stardom she’s seeking." Sam C. Mac of Slant Magazine said, "Singing big string-laden power ballads, flexing her often-underutilized rap cadence over patient house grooves, and unapologetically indulging her distinctive genre tastes, True Romance largely proves that Estelle's talents were being too encumbered by the demands of record execs and producer John Legend, delivering a fleet 45 minutes of music that sounds more true to her West London upbringing."

== Track listing ==
No.	Title	Writer(s)	Producer(s)	Length
1.	"Time After Time"	Estelle Swaray	Keith Harris	3:49
2.	"Conqueror"	Swaray; Angel Higgs; Jaramye Daniels; Akil C. King; Claude Kelly; Kyle Henry; Bailey Owens	Sharif "Reefa" Slater; Johnny Black	4:27
3.	"Something Good / Devotion (Passion Interlude)"	Swaray; D. Smith /; TS Desandies	D. Smith / Soundwavve	6:10
4.	"Make Her Say (Beat It Up)"	Swaray; Smith	Smith	2:38
5.	"Time Share (Suite 509)"	Swaray; Janelle Kroll; Sash Blu; J. Richardson	Best Kept Secret; Ivan Barias^{[a]}	4:50
6.	"The Same"	Swaray; Angélique Cinélu	Harris	4:23
7.	"Fight for It"	Swaray; Smith	Smith	4:01
8.	"Silly Girls"	Swaray; Samuel Dew	J.U.S.T.I.C.E. League	3:26
9.	"Gotcha Love"	Swaray	Darhyl "Hey DJ" Camper Jr.	3:25
10.	"She Will Love"	Swaray; King	Reefa	3:40
11.	"All That Matters"	Swaray	Josiah Bell	4:06
Total length:				44:55

True Romance — iTunes Store bonus track
No.	Title	Writer(s)	Producer(s)	Length
12.	"Not Sure"	Swaray; Luke; Moraites; Slater	Myles William; Kibwe "12Keyz" Luke; Reefa	4:07

Notes

- ^{^[a]} signifies an additional producer
- "Silly Girls" contains a sample of "I Don't Want to Play Around" by Ace Spectrum, written by Ed Zant and Aubrey Johnson

== Charts ==
Chart (2015)	Peak position
US Top R&B/Hip-Hop Albums (Billboard)	31
