= Free (Estelle song) =

2004 single by Estelle

Single by Estelle featuring Megaman

from the album The 18th Day
- B-side: "Freedom"; "Change Is Coming"
- Released: 4 October 2004
- Length: 3:22
- Label: V2; Stellarents; JDID; Festival Mushroom (Australia)
- Songwriters: Estelle Swaray; Jimmy Hogarth; Megaman
- Producer: Jimmy Hogarth

Estelle singles chronology
"1980" (2004)	"Free" (2004)	"Go Gone" (2005)

"Free" is the second single from British singer-songwriter Estelle's debut album, The 18th Day (2004). The song features a rap from So Solid Crew's Megaman. It preceded the album's release by two weeks. In "Free", Estelle raps and sings about living life in a positive way, spreading love, being oneself, and working hard to achieve the most one can in life.

Released on 4 October 2004, "Free" peaked at number 15 on the UK Singles Chart and was Estelle's second consecutive solo top-20 hit, peaking only one place lower than her previous single "1980". In Australia, it was released as the final single from the album on 29 November 2004 and reached number 49 on the ARIA Singles Chart. In Ireland, the song peaked at number 50.

== Music video ==
The music video for "Free" was directed by Andy Hylton. As well as featuring an appearance from guest rapper Megaman, the video features cameos from fellow British singers Beverley Knight, Natasha Bedingfield, Terri Walker, Kelli Young of Liberty X, Jamie Scott, Indo-Canadian singer Raghav and US singer John Legend.

The video leads into B-side "Freedom", which features John Legend on piano.

== Track listings ==
UK CD1

1. "Free" (featuring Megaman) – 3:22
2. "Freedom" (featuring John Legend) – 5:06

UK CD2

1. "Free" (featuring Megaman) – 3:22
2. "Freedom" (featuring John Legend) – 5:06
3. "Change Is Coming" – 4:01

Australian CD single

1. "Free" (featuring Megaman)
2. "Freedom" (featuring John Legend)
3. "Change Is Coming"
4. "Free" (Girls remix)

== Personnel ==
Personnel are lifted from the UK CD1 liner notes.

- Estelle Swaray – writing, vocals, backing vocals
- Jimmy Hogarth – writing, production, guitar
- Megaman – writing, vocals
- E-Boogie – co-arrangement
- Jason Joyce – photography

== Charts ==
Chart (2004)	Peak position
Australia (ARIA)	49
Ireland (IRMA)	50
Scotland Singles (OCC)	29
UK Singles (OCC)	15
UK Indie (OCC)	1
UK Hip Hop/R&B (OCC)	3

== Release history ==
Region	Date	Format(s)	Label(s)	Ref.
United Kingdom	4 October 2004	CD	V2; Stellarents; JDID	
Australia	29 November 2004	12-inch vinyl; CD	V2; Stellarents; JDID; Festival Mushroom	
