= Fall in Love (Estelle song) =

Single by Estelle

from the album All of Me
- Released: 1 August 2010
- Genre: Post-disco; hip hop; dance-pop
- Length: 3:29
- Label: Atlantic
- Songwriter(s): Estelle, DJ Frank E, Nas, John Legend, Tiyon "TC" Mack, Le'Che Martin, Chad "C-Note" Roper, Amir Windom
- Producer(s): DJ Frank E

Estelle singles chronology
"Freak" (2010)	"Fall in Love" (2010)	"Break My Heart" (2011)

Nas singles chronology
"As We Enter" (2010)	"Fall in Love" (2010)	"Ghetto Dreams" (2011)

DJ Frank E singles chronology
"Dang-A-Lang" (2010)	"Fall in Love" (2010)	"Turn Around (5, 4, 3, 2, 1)" (2010)

"Fall in Love" is a single by Estelle. It was produced by DJ Frank E. The single release features three versions, a solo version, a version featuring John Legend and a version featuring Nas. There are two editions of the music video featuring the John Legend and Nas mixes. It was due to be released as the second single from her third studio album All of Me but was instead included as a US bonus track.

The song was premiered on Estelle's official website on 25 May 2010.

A remix single pack was released on 21 September 2010 and featured remixes from Scandinavian music duos Bauer & Lanford and Martin Danielle & Carl Louis, among others.

== Formats and track listings ==
Digital single

1. "Fall in Love" – 3:29
2. "Fall in Love" (featuring John Legend) – 3:30
3. "Fall in Love" (featuring Nas) – 3:48

Digital remix single

1. "Fall in Love" (Seamus Haji Remix) – 7:07
2. "Fall in Love" (Axel Bauer & Lanford Club Mix) – 6:50
3. "Fall in Love" (Scott Wozniak & Kenny Summit Remix) – 6:43
4. "Fall in Love" (Carl Louis & Martin Danielle Remix) – 6:03
5. "Fall in Love" (Cutmore Club Mix) – 5:58
6. "Fall in Love" (DJ White Shadow Remix) – 5:02
7. "Fall in Love" (Avenue Remix) – 3:51

Promo single (US)

1. "Fall in Love" (featuring Nas) (Dirty) – 3:48
2. "Fall in Love" (featuring Nas) (Radio) – 3:48
3. "Fall in Love" (featuring John Legend) (Radio) – 3:30
4. "Fall in Love" (Instrumental) – 3:48

== Charts ==
Chart (2010)	Peak position
South Korea International (Circle)	28
US Billboard Hot R&B/Hip-Hop Songs	71

== Release history ==
Region	Date	Format	Version	Label
United Kingdom	1 August 2010	Digital download	Original mixes	Atlantic, Homeschool
United Kingdom	7 November 2010	Digital download	Remixes	Atlantic, Homeschool
