= 1980 (song) =

2004 single by Estelle

Single by Estelle

from the album The 18th Day
- B-side: "Don't Talk"
- Released: 19 July 2004
- Genre: Hip hop
- Length: 4:01
- Label: V2; JDID
- Songwriters: Linda Creed; Thomas Bell; Estelle Swaray; Rich Shelton; Kevin Veney; Loren Hill
- Producers: Rich Shelton; Kevin Veney; Loren Hill

Estelle singles chronology
"1980" (2004)	"Free" (2004)

"1980" is a song by British rapper and singer-songwriter Estelle, released as her debut single on 19 July 2004. It served as the lead single from her debut album, The 18th Day (2004). In the song, which samples Tony Orlando and Dawn's "Lazy Susan", Estelle talks about her childhood in London; she titled the song "1980" for the year she was born. The single reached number 14 on the UK Singles Chart and was the highest-charting single from the album. It also reached number 36 in both Australia and Sweden. Estelle performed the song during her set at the BBC 1Xtra urban music event.

== Music video ==
The music video for "1980" depicts events that took place in Estelle's younger years, which are featured in the lyrics of the song. The video features members of Estelle's family and leads into album track and the B-side for "1980", "Don't Talk" at the end of the video. This video, as well as the video for follow-up single "Free", was directed by Andy Hylton.

== Track listing ==
UK and Australian CD single

1. "1980" – 3:59
2. "Don't Talk" – 3:38
3. "Don't Talk" (remix) – 3:40

== Charts ==
Chart (2004)	Peak position
Australia (ARIA)	36
Scottish Singles Sales (Official Charts)	30
Sweden (Sverigetopplistan)	36
UK Singles (Official Charts)	14
UK Indie (Official Charts)	1
UK Hip Hop/R&B (Official Charts)	8

== Release history ==
Region	Date	Format(s)	Label(s)	Ref.
United Kingdom	19 July 2004	CD	V2; JDID	
Australia	13 September 2004	CD	V2; JDID	
