= Come Over (Estelle song) =

Single by Estelle featuring Sean Paul

from the album Shine
- Released: 15 September 2008
- Genre: Reggae; dancehall; R&B
- Length: 3:41 (album version); 3:47 (remix)
- Label: Atlantic, Homeschool
- Songwriters: Estelle Swaray, John Stephens, Dwayne Chin-Quee, Mitchum Chin, Jason Farmer, Sean Henriques
- Producer: Supa Dups

Estelle singles chronology
"Pretty Please (Love Me)" (2008)	"Come Over" (2008)	"Guilty as Charged" (2008)

Estelle US singles chronology
"American Boy" (2008)	"Come Over" (2008)	"Guilty as Charged" (2008)

Sean Paul singles chronology
"Watch Dem Roll" (2007)	"Come Over" (2008)	"Feel It" (2009)

"Come Over" is the fifth UK single and the second US single from Estelle's second studio album Shine (2008). A remixed version of the song was released, featuring reggae artist Sean Paul. It was released to US radio on 15 September 2008.

In the UK the digital download was released on 13 December 2008. The physical release was scheduled for the same date but was cancelled last minute.

== Music video ==
The music video was filmed during the week of 2 October 2008. It was directed by Lil X and was produced by the company DNA. The video features a cameo from Kardinal Offishall, and was uploaded to YouTube.

Estelle was asked about being close to Sean Paul in the video, and said: "There are two arguments going on in your head. 'I can't be fake, but how can I do this without feeling like a slut?' It's a tough one."

== Charts ==
Chart (2008)	Peak position
Austria (Ö3 Austria Top 40)	55
Germany (GfK)	62
Türkiye Top 20 (Billboard Türkiye)	19
US Hot R&B/Hip-Hop Songs (Billboard)	56
US Pop 100 (Billboard)	98
