= Wait a Minute (Just a Touch) =

Single by Estelle featuring will.i.am

from the album Shine
- Released: 19 November 2007
- Genre: Hip-hop
- Length: 3:40 (radio/album version); 4:21 (extended version)
- Label: Atlantic
- Songwriters: Will Adams; Estelle; John Stephens
- Producer: will.i.am

Estelle singles chronology
"Go Gone" (2005)	"Wait a Minute (Just a Touch)" (2007)	"American Boy" (2008)

will.i.am singles chronology
"Hot Thing" (2007)	"Wait a Minute (Just a Touch)" (2007)	"Be OK" (2007)

"Wait a Minute (Just a Touch)" is the lead single from British singer and rapper Estelle's second album Shine (2007).

The single features vocals from The Black Eyed Peas lead performer will.i.am, who also produced the record. It was made available for download on 19 November 2007 and then released physically a week later, on 26 November 2007. and the album's release is in February. It samples Screamin' Jay Hawkins' "I Put a Spell on You". The song was released in the UK only.

== Music video ==
On 26 October 2007 the video premiered on AOL music. The video features John Legend. The video starts with Estelle walking down the street whilst at the club a bouncer (John Legend) is stopping people from going in the club. Estelle walks into the club containing artwork from artist Jon Coffelt and gets a smile from John. She dances with her man. Whilst we see them in the night club shots of Estelle sitting on some steps are shown. At the end the man and Estelle go home but the man only got a kiss from Estelle even though he expected to get more. The video was released onto UK iTunes.

== Formats and track listings ==
UK CD (B000Y5VIL6)

1. "Wait a Minute (Just a Touch)" (album version) – 4:21
2. "Wait a Minute (Just a Touch)" (video) – 3:42

Digital Download

1. "Wait a Minute (Just a Touch)" (album version) – 4:21

Note: The version of "Wait a Minute (Just a Touch)" that appears on the CD single is labelled as the album version, however, the radio edit of "Wait a Minute" appears on the Shine album, meaning the extended version present on the "Wait a Minute" CD single is a single exclusive.
