= Thank You (Estelle song) =

Single by Estelle

from the album All of Me
- Released: 4 October 2011
- Genre: R&B
- Length: 4:12
- Label: Atlantic
- Songwriters: Arden Altino; Akene Dunkley; Jerry Duplessis; Douglas Fraser Edwards; Thomas David Richardson; Aliaune Thiam
- Producers: Arden Altino; Jerry Duplessis

Estelle singles chronology
| "Break My Heart" (2011) | "Thank You" (2011) | "Back to Love" (2011) |

"Thank You" is a song from English R&B singer and rapper Estelle, released as the second single of her third studio album All of Me. The R&B ballad was co-written by the American hip-hop singer Akon and was produced by Jerry Wonda. It was released in the United States on 4 October 2011. On the track, she finds herself expressing gratitude to the man who's helped her, because the experience has helped make her both smarter and stronger. It has charted on the Billboard's Hot R&B/Hip-Hop Songs and it is already her most successful single on the R&B chart. It also debuted at number 100 on the Billboard Hot 100.

"Thank You" samples the Creative Source version of "Wildflower" by Doug Edwards and Dave Richardson. Other versions of "Wildflower" have been sampled by Tupac Shakur, Jamie Foxx, Kanye West, Paul Wall and Drake. The song received a nomination for Best R&B Performance at the 55th Grammy Awards held in February 2013.

== Background ==
The song was released as the second official single from her then-upcoming third album All of Me. The emotional, soulful ballad was written by Senegalese-American singer-songwriter Akon and was produced by Jerry Wonda. Despite being heartbroken, the singer is grateful for the experience of the relationship that's just ended. Estelle told Rap-Up TV she fell in love with the track as soon as she heard it. "By the time it got to the chorus I was damn near crying," she said. "It just resonated so much with me. I play it to my guy friends and they cry."

She pours her heart out on the chorus: "These tears I cry sure won't be the last/They will not be the last ... no/This pain inside which never seems to pass/It never seems to pass me by/So I thank you/Said I thank you/Yes I thank you/For making me a woman."

== Critical reception ==
Margaret Wappler from Los Angeles Times wrote that the song "showcases Estelle’s ability to sound pushed to her limits but never broken." Jon Dolan from Rolling Stone describes the song as "resilient post-breakup neo-soul." Mark Edward Nero from About.com praised the track, while reviewing the album, writing that "One of the few tunes where Estelle really shines without any other vocalists is 'Thank You', a sweetly bitter track about how a woman is angry and sad about losing her man to someone else, but also grateful because the experience has made her a stronger person." Jon Caramanica from New York Times said that the track "the gentle, loping “Thank You” is clear homage to Lauryn Hill."

== Music video ==
The music video for the song was directed by Iren Sheffield and premiered on 18 January 2012 on her YouTube account. The video tells a story of love lost.

=== Synopsis ===
A romantic dinner at a luxurious mansion is ruined faster than a sidepiece who won’t stop calling her boyfriend's phone. So, Estelle gets fed up with the games and takes action. While giving a series of looks and a few intimate shots, Estelle searches for the strength to move on and move out. But she may have just been looking for the perfect outfit because she leaves her man high and dry while wearing a fur coat and slides him a message that keeps him thinking on her way out.

== Chart performance ==
The song became her most successful single on the Billboard's Hot R&B/Hip-Hop Songs chart, reaching number fifteen, so far. The song also debuted at number one-hundred on the Billboard Hot 100, becoming her second song to enter the Hot 100 chart. It has spent 50 weeks on the R&B/Hip-Hop chart, becoming her biggest hit on the chart.

== Charts ==
=== Weekly charts ===
| Chart (2012) | Peak position |
|---|---|
| US Billboard Hot 100 | 100 |
| US Adult R&B Songs (Billboard) | 1 |
| US Hot R&B/Hip-Hop Songs (Billboard) | 15 |

=== Year-end charts ===
| Chart (2012) | Position |
|---|---|
| US Hot R&B/Hip-Hop Songs (Billboard) | 24 |
