= Blak Twang =

- Also known as: Tony Rotton
- Born: Tony Olabode
- Origin: Deptford, London, England
- Genres: British hip hop
- Instrument: Vocals
- Years active: 1990s–present

Blak Twang (born Tony Olabode in England), who also uses the pseudonyms Taipanic and Tony Rotton, is a British rapper who grew up in Deptford, Lewisham, South-East London.

Blak Twang is admired for his live performances, and is also respected for the effectiveness with which he includes South London slang and lexicon, including references to specific South London locales, in his music without being too obvious about it. This has made him a favourite of English hip-hop fans, who have dubbed him “the original Hip-Hop Geezer".

== Career ==
Twang's debut single was 1995's "What Goin' On". His debut album, Dettwork SouthEast (a pun on the name of the rail company Network SouthEast) was sent out to the media for the same of self-promotion but never released. It included the song "Real Estate" and the title track, "Dettwork SouthEast".

His second album, 19 Long Time, also suffered from record label obstruction. The album included "Red Letters" and the Roots Manuva collaboration "Shhhoosh".

However, his 2002 album Kik Off was promoted properly by his label, and spawned several singles, including the football-themed "Kik Off", his signature song "So Rotton", and "Trixsta" (featuring Estelle), all of which achieved radio play and a degree of commercial success. In 2005 he released the album The Rotton Club, backed by the single "GCSE (Ghetto Children Sex Education)" featuring Twang's protégé and Rottonus Records signee K9. Twang released another single from the album in late 2005. This was called "Travellin", and the album version featured Barrington Levy, but a video was made for the First Man Remix, which featured the female singer Tali.

On 20 October 2013 he released a single, "Badda Dan Dat", which was remixed by drum and bass artists Run Tingz Cru, Serial Killaz and Terrahawk. It was released through Ramajam Recordings. In September 2014, Dettwerk SouthEast finally received a full release on Sony Music.

Blak Twang has longstanding and close links to the rapper Versetti and to several other rappers. He was featured alongside rapper Ty on the UK remix of Talib Kweli & Hi Tek's "Down for the Count" in 2001.

Blak Twang has been nominated for several awards, including a MOBO, a Kora, and a "Best International Hip-Hop Act" nomination from The Source.

In 2019 Blak Twang joined Ty and Rodney P to form Kingdem, called a "supergroup of British rap elders" by The New York Times.

== Discography ==
=== Albums ===
- 1996 Dettwork SouthEast [reissued 2014]
- 1998 19 Longtime (Recognition)
- 2002 Kik Off (Bad Magic)
- 2005 The Rotton Club (Wall of Sound)
- 2008 Speaking from Xperience (Abstract)

=== EPs ===
- 2013 Rebel Emcee (featuring Congo Natty)
- 2013 Badda Dan Dat
- 2015 The Pantheon EP (feat. Blackmale Beats)
