= The 18th Day =

2004 album by Estelle

Studio album by Estelle
- Released: 18 October 2004
- Recorded: 2003–2004
- Genre: Hip hop; soul; R&B
- Length: 62:49
- Label: V2
- Producer: Atmostfear; Colin Emmanuel; Drew Horley; E-Boogie; Estelle; James Poyser; Jimmy Hogarth; Joe Buhdha; John Legend; Kevin Veney; Loren Hill; Mike Peden; Omar Edwards; Rich Shelton; Thayod Ausar; Tiger Wilson; "You Can Ask" Giz

Estelle chronology
The 18th Day (2004)	Shine (2008)

Singles from The 18th Day
- 1. "1980" Released: 19 July 2004; 2. "Free" Released: 4 October 2004; 3. "Go Gone" Released: 29 March 2005; 4. "Dance with Me (remix)" Released: July 2005

Professional ratings
Review scores
Source	Rating
AllMusic	3.5/5 stars
BBC Music	mixed
The Guardian	4/5 stars
The Independent	3/5 stars
MEN News	4/5 stars
Sputnikmusic	3.5/5
Stylus Magazine	favorable
Uncut	3/10

The 18th Day is the debut studio album by British rapper/singer-songwriter Estelle. The first edition was released on 18 October 2004 and the second edition on 4 April 2005.

The album is almost split into two distinct styles: one half funky, UK R&B hip-hop, with the other more downbeat and soulful. Opening track "1980", the first single, contains a Wall of Sound and lyrics reminiscing about growing up. "Dance Bitch" resembles US hip hop stylings similar to Missy Elliott, while "Go Gone" has a Northern soul sound; "Free" is a bouncy funk number and also served as the second single.

For the ballad "I Wanna Love You" and track "Crazy", Estelle eschews rapping for singing. Final track "I'm Gonna Win" is a dramatic number with uplifting vocals. Estelle was later voted best newcomer at the 2004 MOBO Awards.

== Singles ==
"1980" was released on 19 July 2004. "Free" was released on 4 October 2004. "Go Gone" was released on 29 March 2005.

== Track listing ==
No.	Title	Writer(s)	Producer(s)	Length
1.	"1980"	Estelle Swaray; R. Shelton; K. Veney; L. Hill	Rich Shelton; Kevin Veney; Loren Hill	3:59
2.	"Don't Talk" (featuring Baby Blue)	Swaray; Shelton; Veney; Hill; K. Harper; R. Prager; H. Swaray	Shelton; Veney; Hill	3:39
3.	"Dance Bitch"	Swaray; C. Wilson	E-Boogie	3:47
4.	"Change Is Coming"	Swaray; E. Banks	Thayod Ausar	4:01
5.	"Go Gone"	Swaray; Colin Emmanuel	Colin Emmanuel	3:31
6.	"Free" (featuring Megaman)	Swaray; Megaman; J. Hogarth	Jimmy Hogarth	3:29
7.	"I Wanna Love You"	Swaray; Banks	Thayod Ausar	3:55
8.	"Maybe"	Swaray; O. Edwards	Omar Edwards; James Poyser^{[a]}	5:45
9.	"Crazy"	Swaray; B. Muhammad; F. Oliphant; R. Shaw	Atmostfear; Tiger Wilson	3:54
10.	"Hey Girl" (featuring John Legend and Baby Blue)	Swaray; Prager, R. Douglas, J. Stephens	Joe Buhdah; E-Boogie^{[a]}; John Legend^{[a]}	6:15
11.	"All Over Again" (featuring Royston)	Swaray; Emmanuel; A. Simpson	Emmanuel	4:15
12.	"Dance with Me"	Swaray; M. Peden; C. Russell	Mike Peden	3:41
13.	"On and On"	Swaray; Muhammad; Shaw; N. Robinson Jr.; C. Amorrelli	"You Can Ask" Giz; Atmostfear	3:47
14.	"I'm Gonna Win"	Swaray; Peretti; Creatore; Weiss	E-Boogie; Drew Harley	3.43
15.	"Freedom" (featuring Talib Kweli and John Legend; re-release bonus track)	Swaray; Stephens; T. K. Greene	Joe Buhdah	5:08
Total length:				62:49

Notes

- ^{^a} signifies a co-producer.

== Charts ==
Chart performance for The 18th Day
Chart (2004)	Peak position
Scottish Albums (OCC)	69
UK Albums (OCC)	35
UK Independent Albums (OCC)	1
UK R&B Albums (OCC)	2
