= Shine (Estelle album) =

Studio album by Estelle
- Released: 31 March 2008
- Length: 47:29
- Labels: Atlantic; Homeschool
- Producers: Tom Craskey; Shawn Diggy; Johnny Douglas; Jerry "Wonda" Duplessis; Hi-Tek; Wyclef Jean; Keezo Kane; Steve McKie; Mark Ronson; Jack Splash; Supa Dups; Swizz Beatz; Chris Webber; will.i.am

Estelle chronology
The 18th Day (2004)	Shine (2008)	All of Me (2012)

Singles from Shine
- 1. "Wait a Minute (Just a Touch)" Released: 27 November 2007; 2. "American Boy" Released: 4 March 2008; 3. "No Substitute Love" Released: 15 July 2008; 4. "Pretty Please (Love Me)" Released: 9 September 2008; 5. "Come Over" Released: 16 September 2008

Shine is the second studio album by British rapper and singer Estelle. It was released by Homeschool Records and Atlantic Records on 31 March 2008. The album features Kanye West, will.i.am, Kardinal Offishall, Mark Ronson, John Legend and Cee-Lo.

The album earned generally positive reviews from music critics. It peaked at number six on the UK Albums Chart, eventually reaching Gold status in the United Kingdom, and entered the top ten of the US Top R&B/Hip Hop Albums chart. Shine was preceded by lead single "Wait a Minute (Just a Touch)," while second single "American Boy" featuring West became Estelle's breakthtrough hit, reaching number one on the UK Singles Chart and the top 10 in several other countries. It also garnered two Grammy Award nominations for Best Rap Sung Collaboration and Song of the Year.

== Background ==
The album features Kanye West, will.i.am, Kardinal Offishall, Mark Ronson, John Legend and Cee-Lo. The song "Life to Me" by Hi-Tek featuring Estelle as a guest artist was included on some editions as a bonus track. "Magnificent" was featured in the 2008 film 21, and the single "Pretty Please (Love Me)" was featured in the top-grossing romantic comedy Sex and the City: The Movie, and it is included on the second soundtrack of the film. A version of the album with additional bonus tracks and videos was made available through iTunes. The two bonus tracks are "Life to Me" (also on the UK CD single for "American Boy") and "I Wanna Live", plus the videos for "American Boy" and "Wait a Minute (Just a Touch)". Shine was nominated for the Barclaycard Mercury Prize in 2008.

== Critical reception ==
Professional ratings
Aggregate scores
Source	Rating
Metacritic	76/100
Review scores
Source	Rating
AllMusic	4/5 stars
The Guardian	4/5 stars
Pitchfork	6.8/10
PopMatters	7/10
Rolling Stone	4/5 stars
RWD Mag	4/5 stars
Slant Magazine	3/5 stars
The Skinny	4/5 stars
The Times	4/5 stars

Shine was met with generally positive reviews. At Metacritic, which assigns a normalized rating out of 100 to reviews from professional publications, the album received an average score of 73, based on 18 reviews. Caroline Sullivan from The Guardian found that the "Londoner has constructed something lovable in Shine. Equal parts reggae, pop and hip-hop, it's stuffed with potential singles. It's fairly lightweight and, thanks to its phalanx of American producers, incredibly glossy. AllMusic editor Andy Kellman noted that Estelle could "be proud of having made a second full-length that builds upon and far outstrips her first [...] Through it all, Estelle is the main attraction and is never upstaged or out of her depth." He concluded that "not many vocalists could possibly navigate all this terrain without losing a beat, but Estelle has no trouble pulling it off with her versatility and easy-to-like personality. Her second act is ceaselessly enjoyable, one of the finer R&B albums to be released in 2008."

Ben Hogwood from musicOMH felt that Shine was "the winning end product of her musical dalliances with John Legend and Kanye West, who head an illustrious guest list [...] Compared to the admittedly prodigious vocals of Duffy and Adele, this feels like the real deal." Jon Caramanica from The New York Times called Shine a "charming if sometimes blithe second album [with] a more modern antecedent: the decade-old Miseducation of Lauryn Hill. Rolling Stone's Jody Rosen fund that with Shine "Estelle offers a gritty alternative to R&B; divadom's strutting fembots." But [the] Yanks don't dilute Shine's regional feel — this West London homegirl's perspective is etched in her husky singing, fleet—tongued rapping and wised—up lyrics. The music encompasses rugged modern R&B, dancehall, Sarah Vaughan-style jazz vocalese and, on "No Substitute Love," a reggae-soul-hip—hop torch song." Billboard's Mariel Concepcion found that Shine was "heaving with catchy, instantly likable hip-hop/R&B/pop songs," Rodney Dugue, writing for The Village Voice felt that "Estelle turns Shine into a durable debut, pleasant and shrewd."

== Commercial performance ==
Shine debuted and peaked at number six on the UK Albums Chart. It also opened at number one on the UK R&B Albums chart. The album reached Silver status on 11 April 2008 and was eventually certified Gold by the British Phonographic Industry (BPI) on 29 August of the same year. In the United States, Shine debuted and peaked at number 38 on the US Billboard 200 chart, selling 14,800 copies in its first week. It also reached number six on the Top R&B/Hip Hop Albums chart.

== Track listing ==
Shine track listing
No.	Title	Writer(s)	Producer(s)	Length
1.	"Wait a Minute (Just a Touch)"	Will Adams; Estelle Swaray; John Stephens; Jay Hawkins; Herb Slotkin	will.i.am	3:42
2.	"No Substitute Love"	Swaray; Stephens; Wyclef Jean; George Michael; Lindon Roberts	Jean; Jerry "Wonda" Duplessis	3:34
3.	"American Boy" (featuring Kanye West)	Adams; Swaray; Stephens; Kanye West; Josh Lopez; Caleb Speir; Keith Harris	will.i.am	4:45
4.	"More Than Friends"	Swaray; Stephens; Keith Moore	Keezo Kane	4:25
5.	"Magnificent" (featuring Kardinal Offishall)	Swaray; Mark Ronson; Jason Harrow; Winston Riley	Ronson	3:57
6.	"Come Over"	Swaray; Stephens; Dwayne Chin-Quee; Mitchum Chin; Jason Farmer	Supa Dups	3:41
7.	"So Much Out the Way"	Swaray; Jean; Grover Washington Jr.; Bob Marley; LaRock Scott; Lawrence Parker; Joe Thomas	Jean; Duplessis	4:05
8.	"In the Rain"	Swaray; Johnny Douglas; Barry White	Douglas	4:08
9.	"Back in Love"	Swaray; Stephens; Steve McKie	McKie	4:01
10.	"You Are" (featuring John Legend)	Swaray; Stephens; Tom Craskey	Craskey	3:30
11.	"Pretty Please (Love Me)" (featuring Cee-Lo)	Swaray; Jack Splash; Thomas Callaway; Drew Dixon	Splash	3:58
12.	"Shine"	Swaray; Stephens; Kasseem Dean; Tiffany Green; Dixon	Swizz Beatz	3:49
Total length:				47:29

Shine – Japan and iTunes edition bonus tracks
No.	Title	Writer(s)	Producer(s)	Length
13.	"I Wanna Live"	Swaray; Stephens; W. Robinson	Shawn Diggy	4:05
14.	"Life to Me" (Hi-Tek featuring Estelle)	Tony Cottrell; Swaray	Hi-Tek	4:57
Total length:				56:31

== Singles chronology ==
United Kingdom

- "Wait a Minute (Just a Touch)"
- "American Boy"
- "No Substitute Love"
- "Pretty Please (Love Me)"
- "Come Over" (Remix)

Europe and Australia

- "American Boy"
- "No Substitute Love"
- "Come Over" (Remix)

North America

- "American Boy"
- "Come Over" (Remix)

== Charts ==
=== Weekly charts ===
Weekly chart performance for Shine
Chart (2008)	Peak position
Australian Urban Albums (ARIA)	16
Austrian Albums (Ö3 Austria)	61
Belgian Albums (Ultratop Flanders)	32
Belgian Albums (Ultratop Wallonia)	81
Canadian Albums (Nielsen SoundScan)	42
Dutch Albums (Album Top 100)	53
European Albums (Billboard)	26
French Albums (SNEP)	18
German Albums (Offizielle Top 100)	29
Irish Albums (IRMA)	46
Japanese Albums (Oricon)	106
Scottish Albums (Official Charts)	17
Swiss Albums (Schweizer Hitparade)	29
UK Albums (Official Charts)	6
UK R&B Albums (Official Charts)	1
US Billboard 200	38
US Top R&B/Hip-Hop Albums (Billboard)	6

=== Year-end charts ===
Year-end chart performance for Shine
Chart (2008)	Position
French Albums (SNEP)	184
UK Albums (OCC)	141
US Top R&B/Hip-Hop Albums (Billboard)	81

== Certifications ==
Certifications for Shine
Region	Certification	Certified units/sales
New Zealand (RMNZ)	Platinum	15,000^{‡}
United Kingdom (BPI)	Gold	100,000^{^}
^{^} Shipments figures based on certification alone.^{‡} Sales+streaming figures based on certification alone.

== Release history ==
Release history for Shine
Region	Date
United Kingdom	31 March 2008
United States	29 April 2008
Europe	13 October 2008
Australia	21 November 2008
Brazil	12 December 2008
