= American Boy =

2008 single by Estelle featuring Kanye West

- Standard international artwork

Single by Estelle featuring Kanye West

from the album Shine
- B-side: "Life to Me"; "Wait a Minute (Just a Touch)"
- Released: 31 March 2008
- Studio: Record Plant (Hollywood); Hit Factory Criteria (Miami); Circle House (Miami)
- Genre: R&B; disco-funk
- Length: 4:44 (album version); 3:57 (radio edit)
- Label: Atlantic; HomeSchool
- Songwriters: William Adams; Estelle Swaray; John Stephens; Kanye West; Ethan Hendrickson; Josh Lopez; Caleb Speir; Keith Harris
- Producer: will.i.am

Estelle singles chronology
"Wait a Minute (Just a Touch)" (2007)	"American Boy" (2008)	"No Substitute Love" (2008)

Kanye West singles chronology
"Finer Things" (2008)	"American Boy" (2008)	"Put On" (2008)

Music video
- "American Boy" on YouTube

"American Boy" is a song by British singer Estelle featuring rapper Kanye West from the former's second album Shine (2008). The song was written by the artists, alongside Ethan Hendrickson, William Adams Jr., John Legend (who provides additional background vocals), Josh Lopez, Caleb Speir, and Keith Harris. It was produced by will.i.am, and uses the instrumental from his own song, "Impatient", from his third studio album Songs About Girls (2007). "American Boy" is a breezy R&B and disco-funk song that lyrically describes a romance with an American suitor. The song's conception came after Legend, Estelle's mentor, suggested she write a song about meeting a man from the United States.

"American Boy" was released by Atlantic Records as the album's second single on 31 March 2008. The song received positive reviews from music critics, who praised its fresh sound and production. The song reached the top five in many European and Oceanic markets, and peaked at number-one in Flanders, Slovakia, and Estelle's native United Kingdom. It also achieved success in the United States, peaking at number nine on the Billboard Hot 100 and becoming Estelle's breakout song in the country. The song earned many nominations, and ultimately won a Grammy Award for Best Rap/Sung Collaboration. The music video, featuring a variety of celebrity guests, earned a Video Music Award nomination for Best UK Video. Estelle and West performed the song at the 2008 MTV Europe Music Awards and 2008 Grammy Awards.

== Background and composition ==
"It's a song as breezy as air, so carefree its gorgeously channeled vocals practically float off from the grounded four-on-the-floor disco beat and Quincy-Jones-producing-Michael-Jackson funk bass. It's a pure pop gem with a joyful bounce, verdant in textures (particularly the sunglassed analogue synth stabs), contagiously catchy, danceable and singable, and lyrically devoid of depth or scope, like an aimlessly pleasant walk in the park."

— Timothy Gabriele of PopMatters commenting about "American Boy".

"American Boy" sample

"American Boy" was written by Estelle, William Adams Jr., John Stephens, Kanye West, Josh Lopez, Caleb Speir, Ethan Hendrickson and Keith Harris. It was also produced by will.i.am and recorded over the instrumental of his song "Impatient", from his third studio album Songs About Girls (2007). The credits of Lopez, Speir, and Harris were the result of this sampling. In a 2008 interview with Pete Lewis of Blues & Soul, Estelle explained how the song came to fruition: "We were just messing about in the studio, joking around. And John (Legend) just said to me 'Why don't you write a song about meeting an American boy?'. So I was like 'Well, that's pretty easy' - because I have a lot of male friends out there in New York. And I unwittingly ended up creating a new ladies' anthem!" She also spoke about West's involvement on the song, commenting "Kanye basically just brought his own cheeky self to the track, his own sense of humour. At first he was like 'How can you rap over a dance beat?' - and now he's DONE it!" Instrumentation on the track includes drums, keys, synths, and bass; the former were provided by will.i.am while Caleb Speir provided the latter. will.i.am also co-recorded and co-engineered the song with Padriac Kerin at The Record Plant in Hollywood, Florida as well as Hit Factory Criteria and Circle House Studios in Miami. Serge Tsai mixed the song and recorded West's rap at Platinum Sound Recording Studios in New York City.

"American Boy" is an R&B, disco and funk song with a tempo of 118 beats per minute. Estelle's vocals, which have been described as "sweet" and "flirty", ranges from B_{3} to E_{5}. Timothy Gabriele of PopMatters described Estelle's vocals as those of one connecting "with her inner soul chanteuse". West's rap verse has been described by The New York Times's Jon Caramanica as "perfunctory" and idling "cool". Lyrically, the song describes a foreign woman's interest in a male American suitor, listing places such as New York and Los Angeles as sites she wants to visit. Timothy Gabriele of PopMatters found the song's lyrics to be about "the thrill of new experience, the excitement of a being in a fresh, unexplored environment while simultaneously meeting someone new."

== Release ==
"American Boy" was released as the second single from Shine on 24 March 2008. "American Boy" was released on third CD single formats, as well as a promo single, a maxi single, and 12-inch picture discs. The second CD single contains a radio remix of the song by UK dance and remix group Soul Seekerz. The third CD single features "Lift to Me", a song recorded by US rapper and producer Hi-Tek, featuring Estelle, for his fourth studio album Hi-Teknology 3 (2007). It also includes the music video for the single. The maxi single includes several remixes of the song by Soul Seekerz and TS7 as well as the uncensored version, the version excluding West rap segment, and the song's instrument. The promo single features remixes by TS7 and different versions of the single. The 12-inch disc includes the TS7 remix and remixes of the previous single "Wait a Minute (Just a Touch)" by British electronic duo The Count & Sinden and British disc jockey Aaron Ross. The 12-inch promo features "Wait a Minute (Just a Touch)" and instrumental versions of both songs.

== Reception ==
=== Critical reception ===
Professional ratings
Review scores
Source	Rating
About.com	4/5 stars
Digital Spy	4/5 stars

Mariel Concepcion of Billboard called "American Boy" "a charming duet with West". Andy Kellman of AllMusic, Luke Bainbridge of Observer Music Monthly and Sal Cinquemani of Slant Magazine named the song as a standout on its parent album. Bill Lamb of About.com gave the song a four star rating, listing the chemistry between Estelle and West, the song's beat and Estelle's vocals as the song's highlights. Lamb also added "This song is perfection for a slick, summery glide across the dance floor."

Alex Fletcher of Digital Spy found "American Boy" to "boasts bags of self-confidence ("Don't like his baggy jeans but I like what's underneath 'em," she purrs at one point), a winning chorus and sultry, super-sleek production from Will.i.am and John Legend" while commenting "it shouldn't have taken a guest spot from the self-proclaimed King of Hip-Hop to make this tune a hit." Timothy Gabriele of PopMatters called the song "an essential piece of ebullient summer musical manna rained down from empyreal heights and granted to us passive listeners as one final gift before the world spirals off into an inescapable vortex of cyclones, earthquakes, economic collapse, and a doom-sealing Presidential race." Joshua Love of Pitchfork praised the song's hook and will.i.am's production work. while Omar Jenning of The Skinny was dismissive of West's rap interlude. Ben Hogwood of musicOMH lauded the song as an example of how "Estelle has added a large pinch of soul to take her music to the next level."

=== Accolades ===
In 2009, "American Boy" earned Estelle and Kanye West a Grammy Award for Best Rap/Sung Collaboration, while receiving a nomination for Song of the Year. The song received a nomination for BRIT Award for Best British Single. The single won Best Song at the 2008 MOBO Awards. The song was nominated for Best R&B/Urban Dance Track at the 2009 International Dance Music Awards. It received a nomination for Outstanding Duo or Group at the 40th NAACP Image Awards. "American Boy" was nominated for Best International Song at the NRJ Music Awards 2009. The song won Best Collaboration at both the 2008 UK Urban Music Awards, and the 2009 Urabn Music Awards. The music video earned a nomination at the 2009 MTV Australia Awards for Best Collaboration.

"American Boy" was listed number 7 on the 100 Best Songs of 2008, published by the music magazine Rolling Stone.Blender named it the fourth best song of 2008. The song also ranked the 10th best song of 2008 and 238th on the Top 500 songs of the 2000s, published by Pitchfork. The Village Voice's Pazz & Jop annual critics' poll ranked "American Boy" at number 2 to find the best music of 2008, after M.I.A.'s "Paper Planes". MTV listed the song fourth on its list of "Best Songs of 2008". PopMatters named "American Boy" the best single of 2008. BBC America listed "American Boy" at eighty-five on its list of "Top 100 British Songs of the 21st Century". in 2019, Time Out included it in its list of the 50 best songs of the 2000s. In 2020, The Guardian named it the eighty-fifth greatest ever UK no. 1.

== Chart performance ==
"American Boy" proved to be an international success, outperforming Estelle's previous singles in the United Kingdom and stands as her most successful single worldwide. In the United Kingdom, the song debuted at number 72 on 31 March 2008. It dropped out of the Top 75 the following week and re-entered at number one a week later, where it remained for four consecutive weeks. It lasted thirty two weeks on the singles chart, earning a quintuple platinum certification for sales exceeding 3,000,000 copies. It landed on the UK year end chart at number six and on the end of the decade chart at number 83. In Ireland, "American Boy" entered the singles chart number eight and rose to peak at number two one week later.

In the Flanders region of Belgium, "American Boy" entered the chart at number 41 on 26 April 2008. The song advanced to the top twenty in the following week and inside the top ten three weeks later. It reached the chart's summit on 7 June 2008, where it remained for another week. The song charted in the top five for eleven consecutive weeks and lasted a total of twenty four weeks on the chart. "American Boy" reached number four in the Wallonia region of Belgium and lasted twenty five weeks on the chart. The song also reached number one in Slovakia; number three in Denmark, France, Hungary and Italy; and number five in Germany, the Netherlands, and Switzerland.

In Australia, "American Boy" entered the singles chart at number seven, earning the title of the week's "highest debut". The song rose to number three four weeks later, where it stayed for three consecutive weeks. "American Boy" earned a platinum certification by the Australian Recording Industry Association (ARIA) for sales exceeding 70,000 units. In New Zealand, the single debuted at number 25 on 31 March 2008 and rose to its peak position of number five four weeks later. The song remained on the chart for thirteen more weeks.

"American Boy" experienced great chart success in the United States. The song debuted on the Billboard Hot 100 on 3 May 2008, slowly rising the chart until it reached number 11 almost four months later. It was later removed from iTunes resulting in its fall to number 37 on 6 September 2008. The song was re-added to iTunes, causing a resurgence in downloads that aided its rise to its peak position of number nine on 27 September 2008, selling 91,000 downloads. "American Boy" became Estelle's highest-charting single in the United States, ahead of "Thank You" (2011), which only peaked at number 100. It ended the year at number 39 on the Hot 100 year-end chart and as the thirty-third best selling song of 2008. The song was also her best selling single there, selling 2 million downloads and earning a double platinum certification by the Recording Industry Association of America (RIAA). As of September 2009, "American Boy" was the 25th best-selling downloaded song of all time in the UK, and as of November 2011, it was the 17th best-selling digital song by a British artist in the United States.

== Music video ==
The music video for "American Boy" was directed by Syndrome. It features guest appearances by John Legend, Kardinal Offishall, Sa-Ra's Taz Arnold, Kidz in the Hall's Naledge and Double-O, Danger Mouse, Consequence, Hi-Tek, Ryan Leslie, T.I., Brandon Hines, LL Cool J, and 106 & Park's Terrence J, among others. The music video was nominated for Best UK Video at the 2008 MTV Video Music Awards, but lost to The Ting Tings' single "Shut Up and Let Me Go" (2008). The video also ranked at number 45 on BET's Notarized: Top 100 Videos of 2008 countdown, while its spin-off channel BET J listed it at number 10 on the year-end Last Call 2008! Top 50 Countdown.

== Live performances ==
Estelle performed "American Boy" at various awards shows, where the song also earned her nominations for several categories. She first performed it on The Friday Night Project on 21 March 2008. Estelle performed the song with Kanye West at the Fête de la Musique on 21 June 2008. She performed the song at the 2008 MTV Europe Music Awards with Kanye West singing his rap section, during an image of then newly elected United States president Barack Obama appeared on a giant screen. She later performed it at the 2008 World Music Awards, hosted in Monte Carlo, Monaco, with a live band. Estelle performed a mash up of the song with the Ting Tings "Shut Up and Let Me Go" and "That's Not My Name" at the 2009 BRIT Awards. West also performed the track at the Coke Live Music Festival in 2011.

== Covers, remixes, and parodies ==
- A Russian rapper Timati sampled the music theme for his "Welcome To St.Tropez" song (feat. Bluemarine).
- Busta Rhymes produced a remix version of the song with Estelle, talking over Kanye West's rap section. Both Lost Frequencies and Dutch DJ Brooks also produced remixes of the song in 2019.
- Pitbull remixed the song on the track "American War" from his 2008 mixtape Free Agent, changing the lyrics to be about George W. Bush and the Iraq war, and sampling Edwin Starr's 1970 hit "War" on the chorus.
- The song has also been covered by many artists, including Kid Mac BMK, Casey Donovan, Fall Out Boy, and Sam Sparro. Most notably, Sparro's acoustic rendition of the song was performed on BBC Radio 1's Live Lounge appearing on the station's third compilation album and as a B-side to his single "21st Century Life".
- A reggae cover version of the song, retitled "Jamaican Boy", was released by Bost & Bim featuring Brisa Roché and Lone Ranger in 2008.
- A jazz a cappella rendition, performed by Howard University's Afro Blue, aired during Season 3 of the NBC show The Sing-Off.
- The song has received international parodies, with the name being changed to the synonymous countries. These parodies include Hamish & Andy's "Armenian Boy" and JoePolitics's "Ukrainian Boy".
- In a 2009 episode of Gavin & Stacey, James Corden and Sheridan Smith performed West's second verse in character as Smithy and Rudi.
- In 2014, Blaine Anderson (Darren Criss) and Kurt Hummel (Chris Colfer) covered the song in the Glee season-finale episode "The Untitled Rachel Berry Project".
- In late 2020, a Fortnite-themed parody called "Chug Jug with You", made in late 2018 by YouTuber Leviathan, became popular on the social media app TikTok. On 20 November 2023, the official Fortnite TikTok posted a silent clip that matched up perfectly to the song, leading to speculation that the song could be coming to the game. Leviathan would later make a post to X, noting that this was not the case.
- In 2022, the beat of "American Boy" was sampled on "Party Time", the debut single from UK comedy rap trio The Northern Boys.
- A Malay version sampled the song entitled "Malaysian Boy".
- A Neapolitan version sampled the song entitled "Napoletan boy" by Brava Martina

== Formats and track listings ==
- Digital download
1. "American Boy" – 4:45
- CD single – CD 1
1. "American Boy" (radio edit) – 3:57
- CD single – CD 2
1. "American Boy" – 4:45
2. "American Boy" (Soulseekerz Radio Remix) – 3:52
- CD single – CD 3
1. "American Boy" – 4:47
2. "Life To Me" (Hi-Tek featuring Estelle) (non album track) – 5:01
3. "American Boy" (video) – 4:05
- Maxi single
1. "American Boy" (Soul Seekerz Club Mix) – 7:12
2. "American Boy" (Soul Seekerz Radio Mix) – 3:55
3. "American Boy" (Soul Seekerz Dub Mix) – 7:21
4. "American Boy" (TS7 Remix) – 5:43
5. "American Boy" (TS7 Radio Edit) – 3:51
6. "American Boy" (Dirty) – 4:46
7. "American Boy" (No Rap) – 4:10
8. "American Boy" (Instrumental) – 5:09
- Digital download – Malpractice Remix
1. "American Boy" (Malpractice Remix) – 7:36
- Promo single
1. "American Boy" (TS7 Remix) – 5:43
2. "American Boy" (TS7 Radio Edit) – 3:51
3. "American Boy" (explicit) – 4:46
4. "American Boy" (no rap) – 4:10
5. "American Boy" (instrumental) – 5:09
- 12-inch vinyl
1. "American Boy" (explicit) – 4:46
2. "Wait a Minute (Just a Touch)" (Count & Sinden Remix) – 5:49
3. "American Boy" (TS7 Remix) – 5:43
4. "Wait a Minute (Just a Touch)" (Aaron Ross Remix) – 6:09
- 12-inch promo vinyl
1. "American Boy" (album version) – 4:45
2. "American Boy" (Instrumental) – 5:09
3. "Wait a Minute (Just a Touch)" (album version) – 4:17
4. "Wait a Minute (Just a Touch)" (instrumental) – 4:17

== Credits and personnel ==
Locations

- Recorded and engineered at The Record Plant in Hollywood, California; Hit Factory Criteria Miami and Circle House Studios in Miami.
- Mixed and recorded (West's vocals) at Platinum Sound Recording Studios in New York City.

Personnel

- Songwriting – will.i.am, Estelle, John Legend, Kanye West, Josh Lopez, Ethan Hendrickson, Caleb Speir, Keith Harris
- Vocals – Estelle, Kanye West
- Additional vocals – John Legend
- Production – will.i.am
- production - Jerry Wonda Duplessis
- Recording – will.i.am, Padriac Kerin, Serge Tsai (West's vocals)
- Engineering – will.i.am, Padriac Kerin
- Drum programming – will.i.am
- Keyboards – will.i.am
- Synthesizers – will.i.am
- Guitar – Josh Lopez
- Bass – Caleb Speir
- Mixing – Serge Tsai

Credits adapted from the liner notes of Shine, Atlantic Records, HomeSchool Records.

== Charts ==
=== Weekly charts ===
Weekly chart performance for "American Boy"
Chart (2008–2009)	Peak position
Australia (ARIA)	3
Austria (Ö3 Austria Top 40)	7
Belgium (Ultratop 50 Flanders)	1
Belgium (Ultratop 50 Wallonia)	4
Canada Hot 100 (Billboard)	9
CIS Airplay (TopHit)	189
Czech Republic Airplay (ČNS IFPI)	7
Denmark (Tracklisten)	3
Europe (European Hot 100)	1
France (SNEP)	3
Germany (GfK)	5
Greece (IFPI)	12
Hungary (Rádiós Top 40)	3
Ireland (IRMA)	2
Italy (FIMI)	3
Japan Hot 100 (Billboard)	11
Netherlands (Dutch Top 40)	6
Netherlands (Single Top 100)	5
New Zealand (Recorded Music NZ)	5
Norway (VG-lista)	10
Scottish Singles Sales (Official Charts)	1
Slovakia Airplay (ČNS IFPI)	1
Sweden (Sverigetopplistan)	14
Switzerland (Schweizer Hitparade)	5
Turkey (IFPI)	3
UK Singles (Official Charts)	1
UK Hip Hop/R&B (Official Charts)	1
US Billboard Hot 100	9
US Pop Airplay (Billboard)	10
US Hot R&B/Hip-Hop Songs (Billboard)	55
US Adult Pop Airplay (Billboard)	26

=== Year-end charts ===
Year-end chart performance for "American Boy"
Chart (2008)	Position
Australia (ARIA)	27
Australia Urban (ARIA)	11
Austria (Ö3 Austria Top 40)	34
Belgium (Ultratop 50 Flanders)	9
Belgium (Ultratop 40 Wallonia)	34
Canada (Canadian Hot 100)	25
Croatia International Airplay (HRT)	5
Europe (European Hot 100)	13
France (SNEP)	37
France Downloads (SNEP)	3
Germany (Media Control AG)	51
Hungary (Mahasz)	14
Ireland (IRMA)	9
Italy (FIMI)	11
Japan (Japan Hot 100)	95
Netherlands (Dutch Top 40)	16
Netherlands (Single Top 100)	21
Sweden (Sverigetopplistan)	81
Switzerland (Schweizer Hitparade)	23
UK Singles (OCC)	6
UK Urban (Music Week)	3
US Billboard Hot 100	39

=== Decade-end charts ===
Decade-end chart performance for "American Boy"
Chart (2000–2009)	Position
UK Singles (Official Charts Company)	83

== Certifications ==
Certifications for "American Boy"
Region	Certification	Certified units/sales
Australia (ARIA)	Platinum	70,000^{^}
Belgium (BRMA)	Gold	
Denmark (IFPI Danmark)	Platinum	15,000^{^}
Germany (BVMI)	Gold	150,000^{^}
Italy	—	54,632
Italy (FIMI) sales since 2009	Gold	35,000^{‡}
New Zealand (RMNZ)	4× Platinum	120,000^{‡}
United Kingdom (BPI)	5× Platinum	3,000,000^{‡}
United States (RIAA)	5× Platinum	5,000,000^{‡}
^{^} Shipments figures based on certification alone.^{‡} Sales+streaming figures based on certification alone.
