= Estelle (musician) =

English singer-songwriter and actress (born 1980)

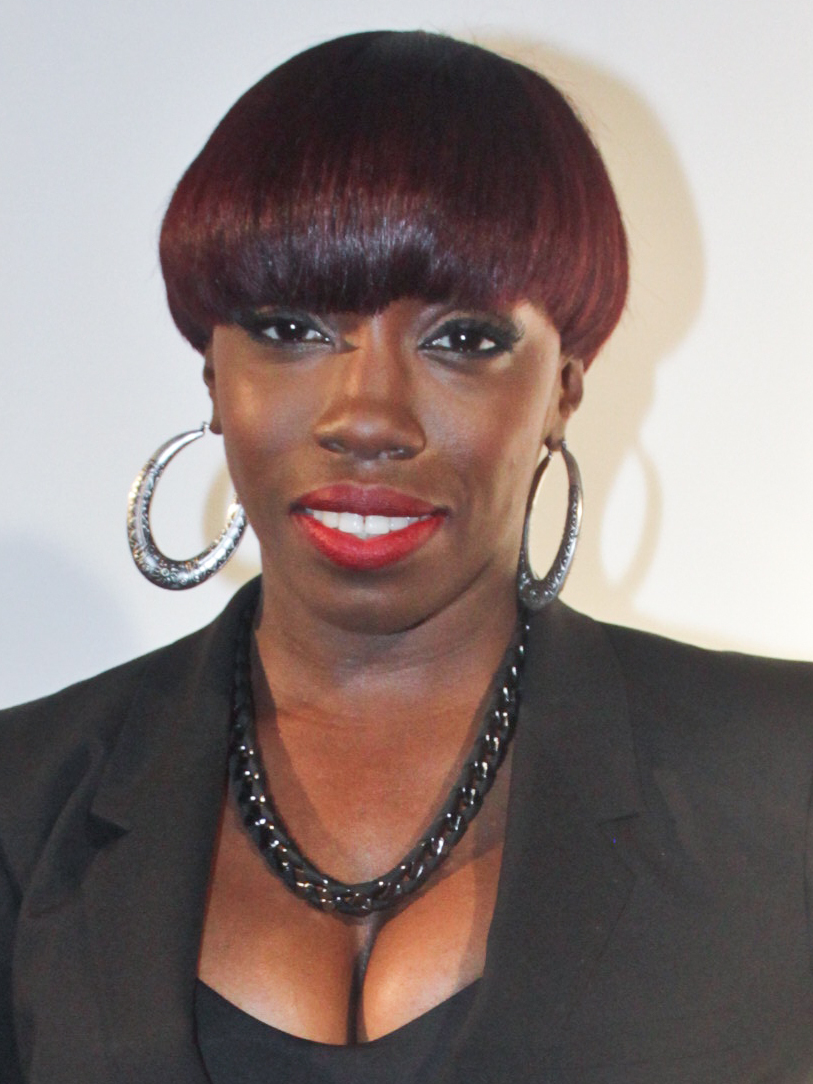
- Estelle in 2011

Background information
- Born: Estelle Fanta Swaray; 18 January 1980 (age 46); London, England
- Genres: R&B; hip-hop; soul; grime; reggae; dance
- Occupations: Singer; songwriter; rapper; actress
- Works: Discography; filmography
- Years active: 2000–present
- Labels: VP; Est. 1980; BMG; Warner; Atlantic; Mama's Boys Music; Homeschool; V2; Universal
- Member of: Black Jays
- Producer(s): John Legend

Estelle Fanta Swaray (born 18 January 1980), known mononymously as Estelle, is an English singer, songwriter, rapper and actress. She is known for her eclectic blending of musical genres including R&B, soul, reggae, grime, hip-hop, and dance. She has collaborated with prominent American artists including Chris Brown, Kanye West, will.i.am, Nas, Akon, Tyler, the Creator, Robin Thicke, and Rick Ross, among others.

Estelle was born in London and began performing in the early 2000s. She met American singer John Legend during this time, who acted as her mentor and produced her debut studio album, The 18th Day (2004). Released by V2 Records to moderate critical and commercial success, it peaked at number 35 on the UK Albums Chart. She then signed with Legend's Homeschool Records, in a joint venture with Atlantic Records, to release her second album, Shine (2008); an international success, it entered the US Billboard 200—as well as other worldwide charts—and was supported by the single "American Boy" (featuring Kanye West), which peaked atop the UK Singles Chart, peaked at number nine on the Billboard Hot 100, and won Best Rap/Sung Collaboration at the 2009 Grammy Awards. Her third album, All of Me (2012), solely entered American and Australian charts and served as her final release on a major label; it was supported by the Grammy Award-nominated single "Thank You".

Estelle provided both the speaking and singing voice for the character Garnet in the animated series Steven Universe (2013–2019), a role she reprised in Steven Universe: The Movie (2019) and Steven Universe Future (2019–2020). She also made cameo appearances in the films Beyond the Lights (2014) and Girls Trip (2017), and appeared as Linda in the Netflix original film Fatal Affair (2020). Estelle hosts and presents The Estelle Show on Apple Music, which has run for over 500 episodes.

== Early life ==
Swaray was born and raised in Hammersmith, London. Her mother's family came from Dakar, Senegal, and her father's family comes from Grenada. She is the eldest of nine children. Swaray's parents were very religious when she was growing up, and secular music was not allowed in the family's home. Instead, spiritual music—particularly American gospel—and West African music were what Swaray grew up listening to. However, she would sometimes listen to hip hop when out of residence.

She spent her childhood listening to her parents' reggae records and her aunt's soul collection before discovering hip hop. "I got into hip hop from my uncle; he was always playing us Kool G Rap and Big Daddy Kane; he was a bad boy and my mum wasn't really happy that I was hanging out with him". By the time she was in her early 20s, she had decided on a music career. She used to be a nanny before she began her music career.

== Career ==
=== 2000–2005: Early work and The 18th Day ===
Estelle got her start in London's renowned hip-hop record store Deal Real. Her fellow employees encouraged her to take a chance and get on the mic on-stage; soon she was playing numerous London clubs and appearing with the likes of Manuva and Rodney P. Local hero Skitz asked her to appear on his 2001 album, Countryman, and soon she landed on albums by artists such as The 57th Dynasty and Blak Twang. She made her solo debut in 2003 with the 12" "Excuse Me", released on the label Paradise Isle.

Her career got a jump-start in the early 2000s when she happened to see Kanye West sitting in a restaurant while on a trip to Los Angeles. Estelle approached Kanye, introduced herself and asked for an introduction to John Legend. She eventually got that introduction, and Legend eventually helped produce two songs on her debut album, The 18th Day, which was released in the UK in October 2004. Her breakthrough track came when "1980" was released by the V2 label and reached number 14 on the UK Singles Chart. A street-level mixtape series called Da Heat and further 12"s like "Free" and "Go Gone" helped build a loyal following, and Estelle gave back to the UK hip hop scene by forming her own Stellarents label to sign new artists. The album was a modest success, debuting at No. 35 on the UK albums chart, and generating two top 20 singles. She received a MOBO (Music of Black Origin) Award in the UK for Best Newcomer.

=== 2008–2009: Shine and mainstream success ===
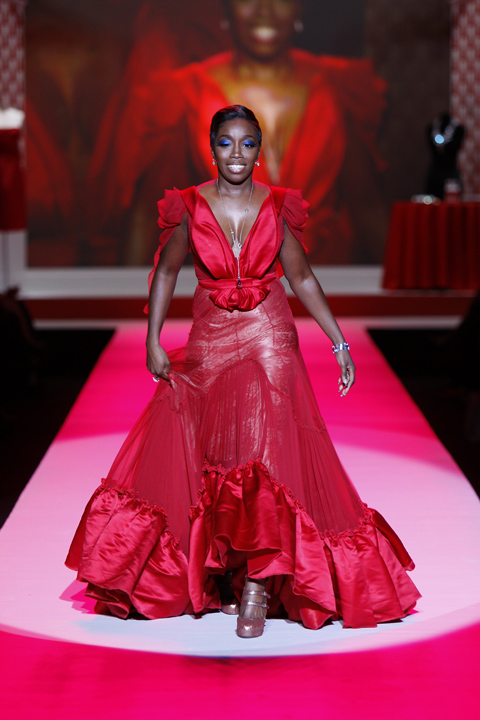
Estelle during the campaign Heart Truth sponsored by the National Heart Forum and Blood Institute for heart disease in 2009.

Three years later, US R&B singer John Legend announced that Estelle would be the first signee to his HomeSchool label, distributed by Atlantic in the US. Four years after The 18th Day's release, Estelle returned with her second album, Shine. Though it was her second album, it was the first to be released in the US and her major-label debut.

Kanye West, Swizz Beatz, Wyclef Jean, Will.i.am, Mark Ronson and CeeLo Green and Jack Splash all worked on the album, which was executive produced by John Legend. "Her sound is a unique blend of hip hop, R&B, reggae and soul," explains Legend. "She has a special voice, unlike any other voice out there in mainstream music, and she can really write. She writes hip lyrics with unforgettable melodies. I recognised that in her when I first worked with her in 2004." He continues, "I'm excited and honored to have Estelle as the first artist on my label, Homeschool Records. I believe the world is going to fall in love with her album, as I already have. Estelle is an amazing talent, and she's going to do big things."

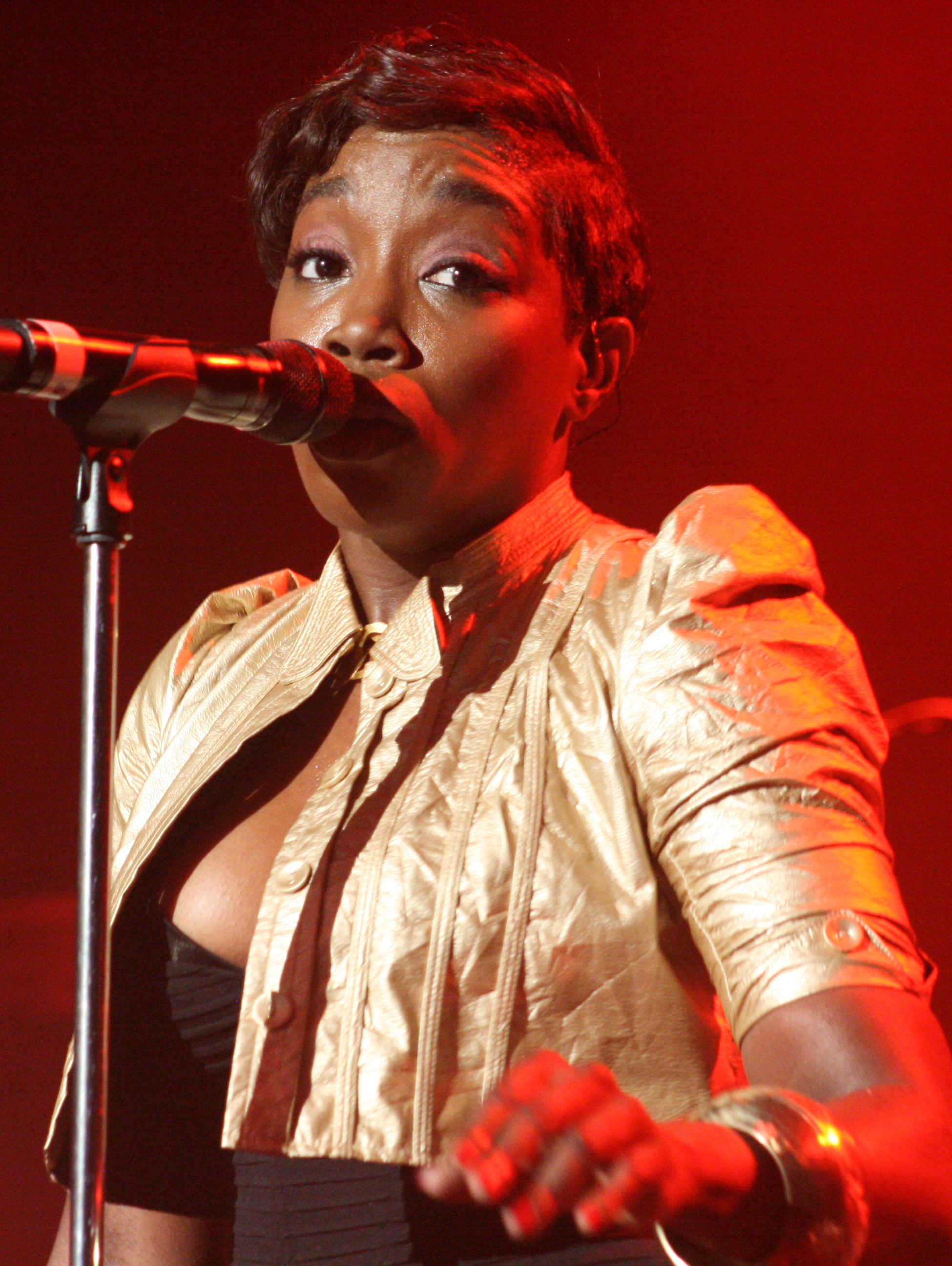
Estelle performing at the Paramount Theatre in 2009.

The lead single, "Wait a Minute (Just a Touch)", released in November 2007. In 2008, Estelle rose to fame with her collaboration with rapper Kanye West, titled "American Boy". This song reached the top 10 in many countries worldwide, including the United States and Canada, as well as achieving number-one status on the UK Singles Chart. and in Belgium and Israel. The song won many awards worldwide, including Best Rap/Sung Collaboration at the 51st Grammy Awards; it was also nominated for Song of the Year. It is rumoured to be inspired by American comedy writer Sam Means after the artist met him near a plane. "American Boy" was Number 7 on Rolling Stone's list of the 100 Best Songs of 2008. The song was nominated for the 2009 Brit Award for Best British Single, and Estelle was also nominated for Best British Female Artist. Shine was released following the single on John Legend's HomeSchool label, reaching the albums chart in most countries worldwide, including number 6 in the UK. Shine sold enough copies to be certified gold by the British Phonographic Industry, and was one of the twelve albums shortlisted for the prestigious 2008 Mercury Music Prize. Shine was certified Gold in the UK, denoting 100,000 copies sold. The album had sold 233,000 copies in the United States as of January 2012. Estelle also released a single with American rapper Busta Rhymes called "World Go Round", from his album Back on My B.S., which was released on 19 May 2009. In February 2009, the song "Star" was released; it is also used for Crystal Light commercials. In 2009, Estelle started working on her upcoming third studio album, All of Me. Estelle made a cameo appearance in the video for new star Mr Hudson for his single "Supernova". Estelle made an appearance on 11 August 2009 episode of The Tonight Show with Conan O'Brien. She performed the song "Good Girls Go Bad" with Cobra Starship in Leighton Meester's absence. Estelle also appears on the song "Rollacoasta", co-written by her and American singer-songwriter Robin Thicke; the song appears on his album, Sex Therapy.

=== 2010–2012: All of Me ===
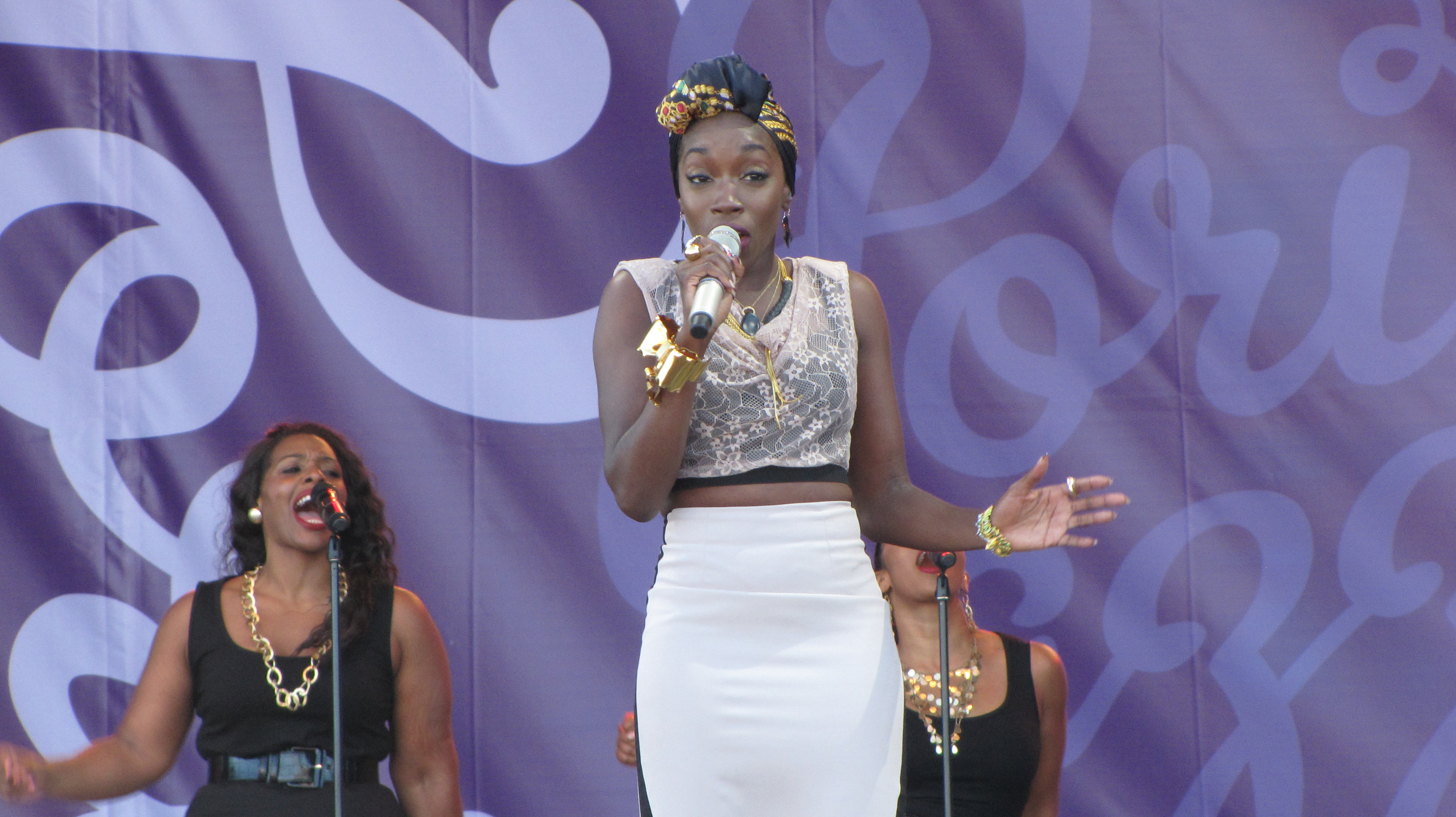
Estelle performing at Pori Jazz Festival in Pori, Finland, in 2012.

Estelle confirmed her third album would be titled All of Me. The album was originally led by the single "Freak", featuring Kardinal Offishall and produced by David Guetta. The video premiered on her website on 26 February 2010. The original second single from the album was announced as being "Fall in Love", which featured versions featuring Nas and John Legend. Due to the underperformance of both "Freak" and "Fall in Love", both songs were ultimately left off the final track listing for All of Me. However, "Freak" was featured on both the Step Up 3D soundtrack and the reissue of David Guetta's album One Love, titled One More Love. In 2010, Estelle also modelled at Naomi Campbell's Fashion For Relief runway show for The White Ribbon Alliance to raise funds for mothers in Haiti. She was also featured on Reflection Eternal's new album with the song Midnight Hour and last track of Gucci Mane's album The Appeal: Georgia's Most Wanted.

In 2011, it was announced that "Break My Heart", featuring Rick Ross, would be released as the new lead single from All of Me. It was released for download on 26 April 2011 and released to US urban radio stations on 17 May 2011. The song peaked at 33 on the US Hip-Hop/R&B, the week of 2 July 2011. The following week the song rose to 37. Dual second singles were released in the US and UK. In the US, the second single was announced as being "Thank You" whereas "Back to Love" was issued in the UK. Estelle subsequently confirmed on Twitter that All of Me was released on 28 February 2012 in the US. In the UK, All of Me was released on 12 March 2012.

=== 2013–2016: True Romance and other ventures ===
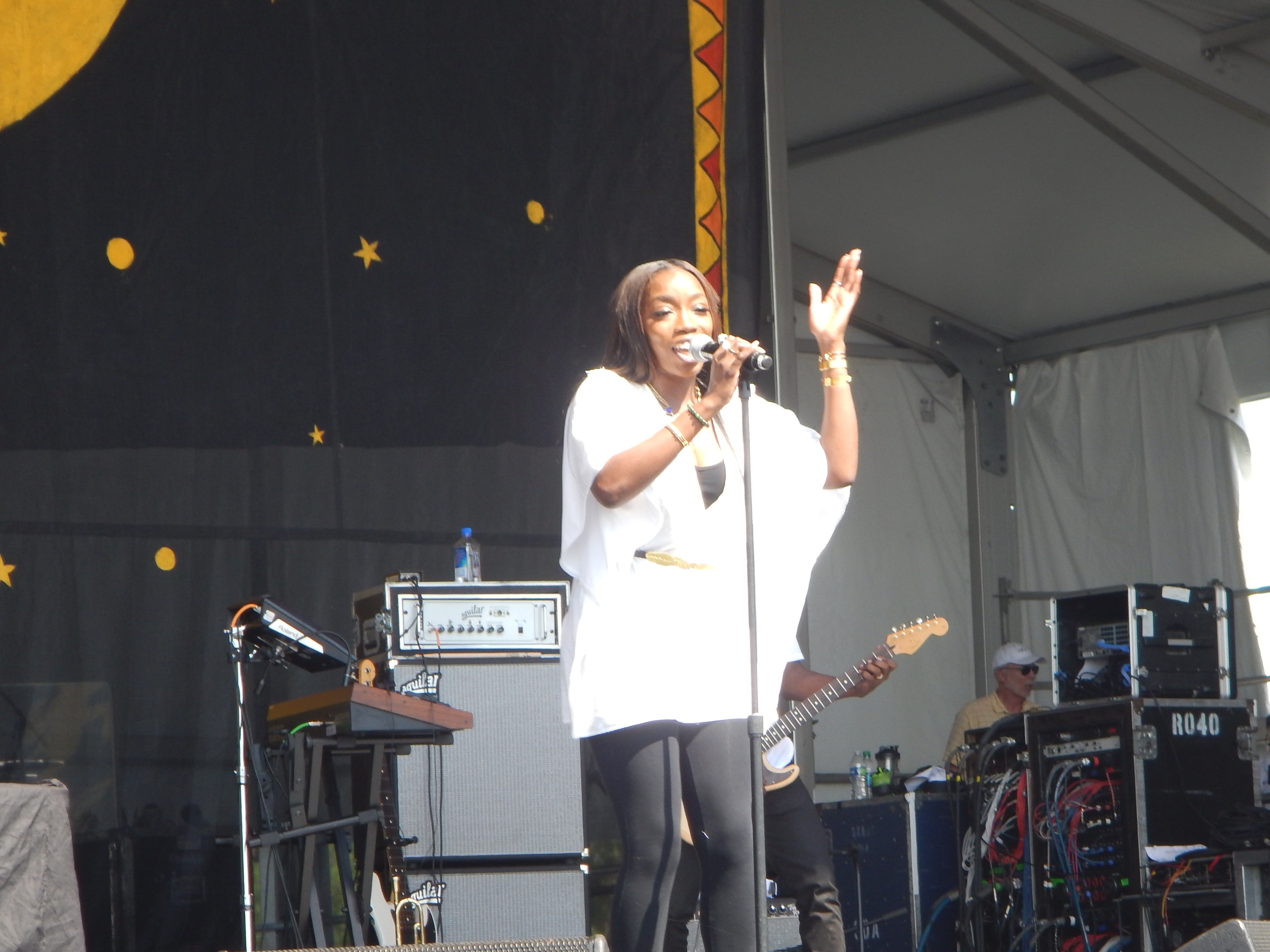
Estelle performing at the New Orleans Jazz & Heritage Festival on 1 May 2015.

In 2013, Estelle announced the launch of New London Records, an independent label in partnership with BMG, with whom she's worked as a writer since 2003. Estelle will release the second and third volumes of her three-volume EP Love & Happiness on the new label (the first volume, Love Jones, was released in June), taking creative control of her current and future musical endeavours. "This is a new and exciting move for me," Estelle said in a press release. "BMG has been an awesome partner throughout my career, and with New London we plan to continue bridging the gap between soul, R&B, London and New York – uniting them through music." Added BMG executive president Richard Blackstone, "Estelle has been a valued member of the BMG family as a writer for some time now. She is a deeply passionate artist gifted with a tremendous voice and has music running through her veins. We are thrilled that Estelle has expanded our relationship and entered into a new partnership with BMG Label Services to release her upcoming album." In November 2013, she began voicing Garnet in the Cartoon Network animated series Steven Universe.

In 2014, Estelle performed live at Amber Lounge, the original Formula One after-party, in Singapore. She would return for an exclusive performance at Amber Lounge Abu Dhabi in November. In March, she premiered the first single off her fourth album True Romance which was "Make Her Say (Beat It Up)." The follow-up single "Conqueror" premiered on 15 July 2014. After numerous delays, the album was released on 17 February 2015 in the US.

In 2015, Estelle guest starred in the hit Fox TV show Empire, singing the duet version of her single "Conqueror" with Jussie Smollett, refuelling sales of the single (peaking at No. 42 on the Hot 100 and No. 15 on R&B) and making it her biggest US hit since her Grammy-winning "American Boy" with Kanye West. In October, Estelle accepted the invitation to be the grand marshal of Howard University Homecoming vs. Norfolk State University. She also sang "We'll Be There", the theme song for Cartoon Network's We Bare Bears.

=== 2017–present: Lovers Rock and acting career, New Album Stay Alta ===
In June 2017, she announced she was working on a full-length reggae album due for a late 2017 release, in addition to releasing the album's lead single "Love Like Ours" featuring Tarrus Riley. On 13 July 2018, the title of the album was revealed as Lovers Rock. The single "Better" was released along with the pre-order. The album was released on 7 September 2018. Estelle also hosts a show on Apple Music, The Estelle Show, playing music that "inspires and excites her." Between 2019 and 2020 she reprised her voice as Garnet in Steven Universe Future and acted as Linda in the Netflix original film Fatal Affair. As of October 2020 The Estelle Show on Apple Music has had over 500 episodes.

Estelle’s sixth album Stay Alta, was released on May 23, 2025.

== Personal life ==
As of 2026, Estelle lives in the United States.

== Artistry ==
=== Influences ===
For her ability to rap, sing, act and write songs, Estelle has been praised by musicians such as John Legend and Roots Manuva; Estelle's taste in music encompasses Todd Rundgren, Lauryn Hill, Kanye West, Nas, Jill Scott and Jay-Z.

In league with other contemporary British sirens like Amy Winehouse, Adele and Duffy, her main musical influences are Mary J. Blige and Ella Fitzgerald. In an interview, Estelle remarked: "Every three years they are talking about the 'British (musical) invasion.' It's been ongoing. It's been an invasion for the last 10 years. We are here! We crossed over. I'm like one of the first black British artists to come over here and win a Grammy. We are here!"

== Discography ==
Studio albums

- The 18th Day (2004)
- Shine (2008)
- All of Me (2012)
- True Romance (2015)
- Lovers Rock (2018)
- Stay Alta (2025)

== Filmography ==
=== Live-action ===
==== Films ====
Year	Film	Role	Notes
2014	Beyond the Lights	Herself	Cameo appearance
2017	Girls Trip	Herself	Cameo appearance
2019	Back to the Goode Life	Jade	
2020	Fatal Affair	Linda	Netflix
2021	Venus as a Boy	Alo	

==== Television ====
Year	Title	Role	Notes
2005	Never Mind the Buzzcocks	Herself	Guest, 20 March
2015; 2017	Empire	Delphine	"Unto the Breach" (Season 1, Episode 9) "My Naked Villainy" (Season 3, Episode 13)
2016	Hell's Kitchen	Herself	Red team's chef's table guest; Episode: "Walking the Plank"

=== Voice roles ===
==== Film ====
Year	Title	Role	Notes
2019	Steven Universe: The Movie	Garnet (voice)	TV movie

==== Television ====
Year	Title	Role	Notes
2013–2019	Steven Universe	Garnet (voice)	Main role
2018	OK K.O.! Let's Be Heroes	Garnet (voice)	"Crossover Nexus"
2018; 2019	We Bare Bears	Herself (voice); Esteller (voice)	"More Everyone's Tube" (Season 4, Episode 14) "The Mall" (Season 4, Episode 27)
2019–2020	Steven Universe Future	Garnet (voice)	Main role
2020	Magical Girl Friendship Squad: Origins	Verus (voice)	"Transit of Verus" (Episode 5) "The Emptier Will See You Now" (Episode 6)

==== Video games ====
Year	Title	Role	Notes
2015	Steven Universe: Attack the Light	Garnet	
2017	Steven Universe: Save the Light	Garnet	
2019	Steven Universe: The Phantom Fable	Garnet	
2019	Steven Universe: Unleash the Light	Garnet	
2022	MultiVersus	Garnet	

== Awards and nominations ==
Estelle's work has earned her numerous awards and accolades, including three MOBO Awards, a World Music Award, and one Grammy Award for Best Rap/Song Collaboration for "American Boy". She has also received two Brit Award nominations, including one for Best British Female Artist.

Year	Ceremony	Award	Nominated work	Result
2008	BET Awards	Best New Artist	Herself	Nominated
2008	BET J Virtual Awards	Female Artist of the Year	Herself	Nominated
2008	BET J Virtual Awards	Soul Approved – Best New Artist	Herself	Won
2008	BET J Virtual Awards	Song of the Year	"American Boy"	Nominated
2008	Mercury Music Prize		Shine	Shortlisted
2008	MOBO Awards	Best UK Female	Herself	Won
2008	MOBO Awards	Best Song	"American Boy"	Won
2008	MOBO Awards	Best Video	"American Boy"	Nominated
2008	MOBO Awards	Best Album	Shine	Nominated
2008	MOBO Awards	Best R&B Act	Herself	Nominated
2008	MTV Video Music Awards	Best UK Video	"American Boy"	Nominated
2008	UMA Awards	Best Album	Shine	Nominated
2008	UMA Awards	Best Collaboration	Herself	Won
2008	UMA Awards	Best Crossover Chart Act	"American Boy"	Nominated
2008	UMA Awards	Best R&B Act	Herself	Nominated
2008	World Music Awards	World's Best New Artist	Herself	Nominated
2008	World Music Awards	Best New R&B Act	Herself	Won
2008	Vodafone Live Music Awards	Best Female	Herself	Nominated
2008	The 02 Silver Clef Awards	Download of the Year	"American Boy"	Won
2009	BRIT Awards	Best British Female	Herself	Nominated
2009	BRIT Awards	British Single	"American Boy"	Nominated
2009	Grammy Awards	Song of the Year	"American Boy"	Nominated
2009	Grammy Awards	Best Rap/Sung Collaboration	"American Boy"	Won
2013	Grammy Awards	Best R&B Performance	"Thank You"	Nominated
