= List of awards and nominations received by John Legend =

John Legend awards and nominations
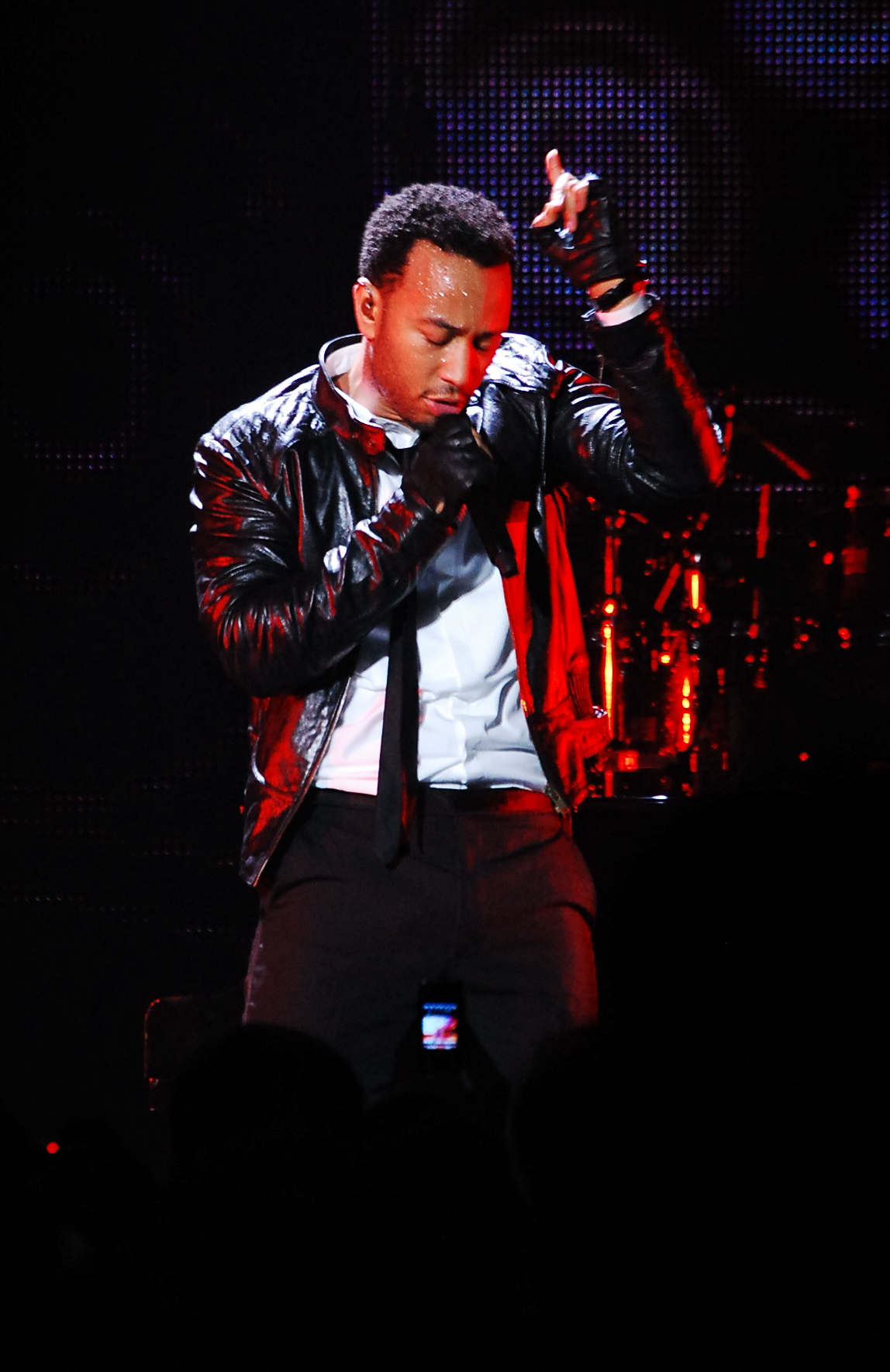
- Legend performing at the Tower Theater in Upper Darby Township, Pennsylvania, on December 5, 2008
Awards and nominations
| Award | Wins | Nominations |
| American Music Awards | 1 | 5 |
| BET | 2 | 7 |
| Children's and Family Emmy Awards | 1 | 1 |
| Daytime Emmy Award | 3 | 4 |
| Grammy | 13 | 39 |
| MOBO | 1 | 3 |
| MTV VMA | 2 | 4 |
| NAACP | 2 | 6 |
| Soul Train | 5 | 12 |
| Academy Awards | 1 | 1 |
| Primetime Emmy Awards | 1 | 2 |
| Tony Awards | 1 | 2 |

Totals (Note: Certain award groups do not simply award one winner. They acknowledge several different recipients, have runners-up, and have third place. Since this is a specific recognition and is different from losing an award, runner-up mentions are considered wins in this award tally. For simplification and to avoid errors, each award in this list has been presumed to have had a prior nomination.)
- Wins: 51
- Nominations: 135

John Legend is an American soul singer, songwriter and pianist. In 2005, Legend received fifteen nominations and won two, including Best New Artist at the Black Entertainment Television Awards (BET Awards) and Best R&B Act at the MOBO Awards. In 2006, Legend received ten nominations and won five, including Best R&B Male Vocal Performance for "Stay with You", Best R&B Album for Get Lifted, Best New Artist at the Grammy Awards; Best R&B/Soul Album Male for Get Lifted, Best R&B/Soul Single Male for "Ordinary People" at the Soul Train Music Awards. In 2007, Legend received six nominations and won three, including Best R&B Performance by a Duo or Group for "Family Affair", Best Male R&B Vocal Performance for "Heaven" at the Grammy Awards; Best R&B/Soul Single Male for "Save Room" at the Soul Train Music Awards.

In 2017, Legend was the recipient of Smithsonian Magazine's American Ingenuity Award for Performing Arts. In 2018 Legend became the first Black man to officially achieve an EGOT with his Emmy win for "Jesus Christ Superstar". (Note: Harry Belafonte and James Earl Jones both won awards completing the EGOT prior to Legend's completion, but their Academy Awards were non-competitive.) Overall, Legend has won 36 awards from 133 nominations.

== Major awards ==
=== Academy Awards ===
| Year | Category | Project | Result |
|---|---|---|---|
| 2014 | Best Original Song | "Glory" (with Common) | Won |

=== Children's and Family Emmy Awards ===
The Children's and Family Emmy Awards, or Children's and Family Emmys, are a part of the extensive range of Emmy Awards for artistic and technical merit for the American television industry. Bestowed by the National Academy of Television Arts and Sciences (NATAS), the Children's and Family Emmys are presented in recognition of excellence in American children's and family-oriented television programming.

| Year | Category | Project | Result |
|---|---|---|---|
| 2023 | Outstanding Non-Fiction Program (as producer) | 1000% Me: Growing Up Mixed | Won |

=== Daytime Emmy Awards ===
The Daytime Emmy Award is an American award bestowed by the National Academy of Television Arts and Sciences in recognition of excellence in American Daytime television programming. Legend has received one award from two nominations for Crow: The Legend.

| Year | Category | Project | Result |
|---|---|---|---|
| 2019 | Outstanding Interactive Media for a Daytime Program (as producer) | Crow: The Legend | Won |
| 2019 | Outstanding Special Class Special (as producer) | Crow: The Legend | Nominated |
| 2022 | Outstanding Daytime Special (as producer) | Shelter Me: Soul Awakened | Won |
| 2022 | Outstanding Short Form Daytime Program (as producer) | Cornerstones: Founding Voices of the Black Church | Won |

=== Dove Awards ===
| Year | Category | Project | Result |
|---|---|---|---|
| 2026 | Traditional Gospel Recorded Song of the Year | "Church" | Pending |

=== Primetime Emmy Awards ===
The Primetime Emmy Award is an American award bestowed by the Academy of Television Arts & Sciences in recognition of excellence in American primetime television programming. Legend has received one award from two nominations for Jesus Christ Superstar Live in Concert.

| Year | Category | Project | Result |
|---|---|---|---|
| 2018 | Outstanding Variety Special (Live) (as producer) | Jesus Christ Superstar Live in Concert | Won |
| 2018 | Outstanding Lead Actor in a Limited Series or Movie | Jesus Christ Superstar Live in Concert | Nominated |

=== Golden Globe Awards ===
The Golden Globe Awards were established in 1944 by the Hollywood Foreign Press Association to celebrate the best in film and television. John Legend has received one nomination and win.

| Year | Category | Project | Result |
|---|---|---|---|
| 2014 | Best Original Song | "Glory" (with Common) | Won |

=== Grammy Awards ===
The Grammy Awards are awarded annually by the National Academy of Recording Arts and Sciences. Legend has won thirteen awards from forty nominations.

| Year | Category | Project | Result |
|---|---|---|---|
| 2006 | Best New Artist | John Legend | Won |
| 2006 | Best R&B Album | Get Lifted | Won |
| 2006 | Best R&B Performance by a Duo or Group with Vocals | "So High" (featuring Lauryn Hill) | Nominated |
| 2006 | Best Traditional R&B Vocal Performance | "Stay with You" | Nominated |
| 2006 | Best Rap/Sung Collaboration | "They Say" (with Common & Kanye West) | Nominated |
| 2006 | Song of the Year | "Ordinary People" | Nominated |
| 2006 | Best R&B Song | "Ordinary People" | Nominated |
| 2006 | Best Male R&B Vocal Performance | "Ordinary People" | Won |
| 2007 | Best Male R&B Vocal Performance | "Heaven" | Won |
| 2007 | Best Male Pop Vocal Performance | "Save Room" | Nominated |
| 2007 | Best R&B Performance by a Duo or Group with Vocals | "Family Affair" (with Joss Stone & Van Hunt) | Won |
| 2009 | Best R&B Performance by a Duo or Group with Vocals | "Stay with Me (By the Sea)" (with Al Green) | Won |
| 2009 | Song of the Year | "American Boy" (as songwriter) | Nominated |
| 2009 | Best Rap/Sung Collaboration | "Green Light" (featuring André 3000 ) | Nominated |
| 2010 | Best Male Pop Vocal Performance | "This Time" | Nominated |
| 2011 | Best R&B Performance by a Duo or Group with Vocals | "Shine" | Nominated |
| 2011 | Best R&B Song | "Shine" | Won |
| 2011 | Best Traditional R&B Vocal Performance | "Hang On In There" (with The Roots) | Won |
| 2011 | Best R&B Album | Wake Up! (with The Roots) | Won |
| 2011 | Best Rap/Sung Collaboration | "Wake Up Everybody" (with The Roots, featuring Common & Melanie Fiona) | Nominated |
| 2013 | Best Rap/Sung Collaboration | "Tonight (Best You Ever Had)" (featuring Ludacris) | Nominated |
| 2014 | Best R&B Album | Love in the Future | Nominated |
| 2015 | Best Pop Solo Performance | "All of Me" (Live) | Nominated |
| 2015 | Best Rap Song | "Bound 2" (as songwriter) | Nominated |
| 2016 | Best Rap Song | "Glory" (with Common) | Nominated |
| 2016 | Best Song Written for Visual Media | "Glory" (with Common) | Won |
| 2016 | Best Rap/Sung Collaboration | "Glory" (with Common) | Nominated |
| 2016 | Best Rap/Sung Collaboration | "One Man Can Change the World" (with Big Sean and Kanye West) | Nominated |
| 2019 | Best Musical Theater Album | Jesus Christ Superstar Live in Concert | Nominated |
| 2020 | Best Rap/Sung Performance | "Higher" (with DJ Khaled and Nipsey Hussle) | Won |
| 2020 | Best Traditional Pop Vocal Album | A Legendary Christmas | Nominated |
| 2021 | Best R&B Performance | "Lightning & Thunder" (with Jhené Aiko) | Nominated |
| 2021 | Best R&B Album | Bigger Love | Won |
| 2023 | Song of the Year | "God Did" (with DJ Khaled, Rick Ross, Lil Wayne, Jay-Z and Fridayy) | Nominated |
| 2023 | Best Rap Performance | "God Did" (with DJ Khaled, Rick Ross, Lil Wayne, Jay-Z and Fridayy) | Nominated |
| 2023 | Best Rap Song | "God Did" (with DJ Khaled, Rick Ross, Lil Wayne, Jay-Z and Fridayy) | Nominated |
| 2025 | Best Children's Music Album | My Favorite Dream | Nominated |
| 2025 | Best Arrangement, Instrumental or A Cappella | "Bridge Over Troubled Water" (with Jacob Collier and Tori Kelly) | Won |
| 2025 | Best Arrangement, Instrumental and Vocals | "Always Come Back" (with Matt Jones) | Nominated |
| 2026 | Best Gospel Performance/Song | "Church" (with Tasha Cobbs Leonard) | Nominated |

=== Tony Award ===
The Tony Award recognizes the excellence in live Broadway theatre. The awards are presented by the American Theatre Wing and The Broadway League. Legend has received one award from two nominations.

| Year | Category | Project | Result |
|---|---|---|---|
| 2017 | Best Revival of a Play | Jitney (as co-producer) | Won |
| 2018 | Best Original Score | SpongeBob SquarePants | Nominated |

== Other awards ==
=== Academy of Country Music Awards ===
The Academy of Country Music Awards is an annual awards ceremony created by the Academy of Country Music in 1966. Legend has been nominated one time.

| Year | Nominee / work | Award | Result |
|---|---|---|---|
| 2021 | "Hallelujah" (with Carrie Underwood) | Video of the Year | Nominated |

=== American Music Awards ===
The American Music Awards is an annual awards ceremony created by Dick Clark in 1973. Legend has been nominated five times, and received one award.

| Year | Nominee / work | Award | Result |
|---|---|---|---|
| 2005 | John Legend | Favorite Male R&B/Soul Artist | Nominated |
| 2014 | John Legend | Favorite Pop/Rock Male Artist | Nominated |
| 2014 | John Legend | Favorite Soul/R&B Male Artist | Won |
| 2014 | Love in the Future | Favorite Soul/R&B Album | Nominated |
| 2014 | "All of Me" | Single of the Year | Nominated |
| 2016 | "Like I'm Gonna Lose You" (with Meghan Trainor) | Collaboration of the Year | Nominated |

=== BET Awards ===
The BET Awards were established in 2001 by the Black Entertainment Television network to celebrate African Americans and other minorities in music, acting, sports, and other fields of entertainment. The awards are presented annually and broadcast live on BET. Legend has won three awards from twelve nominations.

| Year | Nominee / work | Award | Result |
|---|---|---|---|
| 2005 | "Ordinary People" | Video of the Year | Nominated |
| 2005 | John Legend | Best Male R&B Artist | Nominated |
| 2005 | John Legend | Best New Artist | Won |
| 2007 | John Legend | Best Male R&B Artist | Nominated |
| 2014 | John Legend | Best Male R&B Artist | Nominated |
| 2015 | "Glory" (with Common) | Video of the Year | Nominated |
| 2015 | "Glory" (with Common) | Best Collaboration | Won |
| 2015 | John Legend | Best Male R&B Artist | Nominated |
| 2016 | "One Man Can Change the World" (with Big Sean & Kanye West) | Best Collaboration | Nominated |
| 2019 | John Legend | Best Male R&B/Pop Artist | Nominated |
| 2020 | "Higher" (with DJ Khaled & Nipsey Hussle) | Best Collaboration | Nominated |
| 2020 | "Higher" (with DJ Khaled & Nipsey Hussle) | Video of the Year | Won |
| 2026 | "Church" (with Tasha Cobbs Leonard) | Dr. Bobby Jones Best Gospel/Inspirational Award | Pending |

=== Billboard Music Awards ===
The Billboard Music Awards are sponsored by Billboard magazine and is based on sales data by Nielsen SoundScan and radio information by Nielsen Broadcast Data Systems. Legend received two of seven nominations.

| Year | Nominee / work | Award | Result |
|---|---|---|---|
| 2015 | John Legend | Top Radio Songs Artist | Nominated |
| 2015 | John Legend | Top R&B Artist | Nominated |
| 2015 | "All of Me" | Top Hot 100 Song | Nominated |
| 2015 | "All of Me" | Top Radio Song | Won |
| 2015 | "All of Me" | Top Streaming Song (Audio) | Won |
| 2015 | "All of Me" | Top R&B Song | Nominated |
| 2015 | Love in the Future | Top R&B Album | Nominated |

=== Black Reel Awards ===
The Black Reel Awards is an annual American awards ceremony hosted by the Foundation for the Augmentation of African-Americans in Film (FAAAF) to recognize excellence of African-Americans, as well as the cinematic achievements of the African diaspora, in the global film industry, as assessed by the Foundation's voting membership.

| Year | Nominee / work | Award | Result |
|---|---|---|---|
| 2011 | "Shine" | Outstanding Original Song | Won |
| 2013 | "Who Did That To You?" | Outstanding Original Song | Won |
| 2013 | "Tonight (Best You Ever Had)" | Outstanding Original Song | Nominated |
| 2015 | "Glory" | Outstanding Original Song | Won |
| 2017 | "Start" | Outstanding Original Song | Nominated |
| 2021 | "Make It Work" | Outstanding Original Song | Nominated |

=== CMT Music Awards ===
The CMT Music Awards was a fan-voted awards show for country music videos and television performances from 1967 to 2024. Legend has been nominated twice, with the Video of the Year retroactively designated in 2025 as an MTV Video Music Award for Best Country.

| Year | Nominee / work | Award | Result |
|---|---|---|---|
| 2021 | "Hallelujah" (with Carrie Underwood) | Video of the Year | Won |
| 2021 | "Hallelujah" (with Carrie Underwood) | Collaborative Video of the Year | Nominated |

=== Film Independent Spirit Awards ===
The Film Independent Spirit Awards is an annual awards show celebrating independent film and television founded by Film Independent.

| Year | Nominee / work | Award | Result |
|---|---|---|---|
| 2021 | Atlanta's Missing and Murdered: The Lost Children | Best New Non-Scripted or Documentary Series | Nominated |

=== Grammy Global Impact Award ===
The Grammy Global Impact Award is a special Grammy Award that is awarded by The Recording Academy to "Black music creators whose dedication to the art form has greatly influenced the industry". The award was established by the Recording Academy's Black Music Collective, which was created with the goal of "amplifying Black voices within the Academy and the wider music community". Legend was the inaugural winner of the honor in 2022.

| Year | Nominee / work | Award | Result |
|---|---|---|---|
| 2022 | Himself | Grammy Global Impact Award | Honoree |

=== iHeartRadio Music Awards ===
iHeartRadio Music Awards is an international music awards show founded by iHeartRadio in 2014. Legend has been nominated twice.

| Year | Nominee / work | Award | Result |
|---|---|---|---|
| 2015 | "All of Me" | Song of the Year | Nominated |
| 2015 | "All of Me" | Best Lyrics | Nominated |

=== Mnet Asian Music Awards ===
Mnet Asian Music Awards, otherwise abbreviated as MAMA, is an award show held by Mnet annually that credits South Korean artists, as well as foreign artists who have had an impact in the South Korean Music industry.

| Year | Nominee / work | Award | Result |
|---|---|---|---|
| 2014 | John Legend | International Favorite Artist | Won |

=== MOBO Awards ===
The MOBO Awards (an acronym for "Music of Black Origin") were established in 1996 by Kanya King. They are held annually in the United Kingdom to recognize artists of any race or nationality performing music of black origin. Legend has won one award from three nominations.

| Year | Nominee / work | Award | Result |
|---|---|---|---|
| 2005 | Get Lifted | Best Album | Nominated |
| 2005 | John Legend | Best R&B Act | Won |
| 2005 | "Ordinary People" | Best Video | Nominated |

=== MTV Video Music Awards ===
The MTV Video Music Awards were established in 1984 by MTV to celebrate the top music videos of the year. Legend has been nominated eight times and won twice, in addition to his 2021 CMT Award for Video of the Year for his collaboration with Carrie Underwood, which is now designated as the MTV Video Music Award for Best Country, which has retroactively been designated lineally as his third win in the category.

| Year | Nominee / work | Award | Result |
|---|---|---|---|
| 2005 | "Ordinary People" | Best R&B Video | Nominated |
| 2005 | "Ordinary People" | Best New Artist | Nominated |
| 2005 | "Ordinary People" | Best Male Video | Nominated |
| 2014 | "All of Me" | Best Male Video | Nominated |
| 2015 | "One Man Can Change the World" (with Kanye West and Big Sean) | Best Video with a Social Message | Won |
| 2017 | "Surefire" | Best Fight Against the System | Won |
| 2019 | "Higher World" (with DJ Khaled and Nipsey Hussle ) | Best Hip-Hop Video | Nominated |
| 2019 | "Preach" | Best Video for Good | Nominated |

=== NAACP Image Awards ===
The NAACP Image Awards is an award presented annually by the American National Association for the Advancement of Colored People to honor outstanding people of color in film, television, music and literature. Legend has been nominated twice.

| Year | Nominee / work | Award | Result |
|---|---|---|---|
| 2009 | John Legend | Outstanding Male Artist | Nominated |
| 2009 | Greenlight | Outstanding Song | Nominated |
| 2014 | John Legend | Outstanding Male Artist | Won |
| 2014 | "All of Me" | Outstanding Song | Won |
| 2014 | "Made to Love" | Outstanding Music Video | Nominated |
| 2014 | Love in the Future | Outstanding Album | Nominated |
| 2016 | John Legend | President Award | Won |
| 2016 | "One Man Can Change The World" (with Big Sean & Kanye West) | Outstanding Duo, Group or Collaboration | Nominated |
| 2018 | "Surefire (Piano Version)" | Outstanding Song, Traditional | Nominated |
| 2019 | John Legend | Outstanding Actor in a Television Movie, Limited-Series or Dramatic Special (for Jesus Christ Superstar Live in Concert) | Nominated |
| 2019 | John Legend | Outstanding Male Artist | Nominated |
| 2019 | "A Good Night" (feat. BloodPop) | Outstanding Duo, Group or Collaboration | Nominated |
| 2019 | "A Good Night" (feat. BloodPop) | Outstanding Song, Contemporary | Nominated |
| 2021 | Bigger Love | Outstanding Album | Nominated |
| 2021 | John Legend | Outstanding Male Artist | Nominated |

=== Soul Train Music Awards ===
The Soul Train Music Awards is an annual award show aired in national broadcast syndication that honors the best in African American music and entertainment established in 1987. Legend has won five awards from twelve nominations.

| Year | Nominee / work | Award | Result |
|---|---|---|---|
| 2005 | "Used to Love U" | Best R&B/Soul or Rap New Artist | Nominated |
| 2006 | Get Lifted | Best R&B/Soul Album, Male | Won |
| 2006 | "Ordinary People" | Best R&B/Soul Single, Male | Won |
| 2007 | Once Again | Best R&B/Soul Album Male | Nominated |
| 2007 | "Save Room" | Best R&B/Soul Single Male | Won |
| 2014 | "All of Me" | Song of the Year | Nominated |
| 2014 | "All of Me" | Record of the Year (The Ashford & Simpson Songwriter's Award) | Won |
| 2014 | Love in the Future | Album of the Year | Nominated |
| 2014 | John Legend | Best R&B/Soul Male Artist | Nominated |
| 2015 | "Glory" (with Common) | Song of the Year | Nominated |
| 2015 | "Glory" (with Common) | Ashford & Simpson Songwriter's Award | Won |
| 2015 | "Glory" (with Common) | Best Collaboration | Nominated |
| 2018 | "A Good Night" (with BloodPop) | Best Collaboration Performance | Nominated |
| 2018 | John Legend | Best R&B/Soul Male Artist | Nominated |

=== Stellar Gospel Music Awards ===
| Year | Nominee / work | Award | Result |
|---|---|---|---|
| 2026 | "Church" (with Tasha Cobbs Leonard) | Contemporary Duo/Chorus Group of the Year | Pending |

=== Vibe Awards ===
The Vibe Awards are hosted annually by Vibe magazine. Legend has been nominated four times.

| Year | Nominee / work | Award | Result |
|---|---|---|---|
| 2005 | John Legend | R&B Voice of the Year | Nominated |
| 2005 | John Legend | Artist of the Year | Nominated |
| 2005 | Get Lifted | Album of the Year | Nominated |
| 2005 | "Ordinary People" | Best R&B Song | Nominated |

== Critics awards ==
=== African-American Film Critics Association ===
The African-American Film Critics Association (AAFCA) is a group of African-American film critics that give various awards for excellence in film at the end of each year. Legend has won one time.

| Year | Nominee / work | Award | Result |
|---|---|---|---|
| 2014 | "Glory" (with Common) | Best Music | Won |

=== Critics' Choice Movie Awards ===
The Critics' Choice Movie Awards are bestowed annually by the Broadcast Film Critics Association (BFCA) to honor the finest in cinematic achievement. Legend has won one award in 2015.

| Year | Nominee / work | Award | Result |
|---|---|---|---|
| 2011 | "Shine" | Best Song | Nominated |
| 2015 | "Glory" (with Common) | Best Song | Won |
| 2018 | Himself (for Jesus Christ Superstar Live in Concert) | Best Actor in a Movie Made for Television or Limited Series | Nominated |

=== Georgia Film Critics Association ===
Legend won one award from the Georgia Film Critics Association in 2015.

| Year | Nominee / work | Award | Result |
|---|---|---|---|
| 2015 | "Glory" (with Common) | Best Original Song | Won |

=== Houston Film Critics Society Awards ===
The Houston Film Critics Society is a non-profit film critic organization which presents an annual set of film awards for "extraordinary accomplishment in film" in a ceremony held at the Museum of Fine Arts, Houston. Legend has been nominated once.

| Year | Nominee / work | Award | Result |
|---|---|---|---|
| 2015 | "Glory" (with Common) | Best Original Song | Nominated |
