= 48th Annual Grammy Awards =

2006 US music awards ceremony

- Date: February 8, 2006
- Location: Staples Center, Los Angeles
- Most awards: U2 (5)
- Most nominations: John Legend, Kanye West, Mariah Carey (8 each)
- Website: https://www.grammy.com/grammys/awards/48th-annual-grammy-awards

Television/radio coverage
- Network: CBS

The 48th Annual Grammy Awards took place on February 8, 2006, at the Staples Center in Los Angeles, California honoring the best in music for the recording year beginning from October 1, 2004, through September 30, 2005. Irish rock band U2 were the main recipients with five awards including Album of the Year. Mariah Carey, John Legend, and Kanye West were each nominated for eight awards and won three; Alison Krauss & Union Station also won three awards; and Kelly Clarkson won two. Green Day were amongst the big winners, winning the Grammy Award for Record of the Year.

== Performances ==
Artist (s)	Song (s)
Madonna; Gorillaz; De La Soul	"Feel Good Inc." "Hung Up"
Alicia Keys; Stevie Wonder	"Higher Ground"
Coldplay	"Talk"
John Legend	"Ordinary People"
Sugarland	"Something More"
U2; Mary J. Blige	"Vertigo" "One"
Kelly Clarkson	"Because of You"
Paul McCartney	"Fine Line" "Helter Skelter"
Mariah Carey; James 'Big Jim' Wright; Hezekiah Walker and The Love Fellowship Choir	"We Belong Together" "Fly like a Bird"
Keith Urban; Faith Hill	"You'll Think of Me" "The Lucky One"
Sly & the Family Stone; Joss Stone; Van Hunt; John Legend; Fantasia; Devin Lima; Maroon 5 Ciara will.i.am Steven Tyler; Joe Perry; Robert Randolph; Sly Stone; Rusty Allen	Tribute to Sly & the Family Stone "Family Affair" "If You Want Me to Stay"" "Everyday People" "Dance to the Music" "I Want to Take You Higher"
Linkin Park; Jay-Z; Paul McCartney	"Numb/Encore"; Yesterday
Bruce Springsteen	"Devils & Dust"
Kanye West; Jamie Foxx; Florida A & M University Marching 100	"Gold Digger" "Touch the Sky"
Christina Aguilera; Herbie Hancock	"A Song for You"
Allen Toussaint; Bonnie Raitt; The Edge; Irma Thomas; Dr. John	"Yes We Can Can"
Sam Moore; Bruce Springsteen; Irma Thomas an ensemble band	"In the Midnight Hour"

== Presenters ==
- Alicia Keys and Stevie Wonder - Pays tribute to New Orleans and Coretta Scott King and presents the award for Best Female Pop Vocal Performance.
- Sugarland and Big & Rich - Pays tribute to Merle Haggard as the Lifetime Achievement recipient and presents the award for Best Country Album.
- Matt Dillon and Ludacris - Pays tribute to David Bowie as the Lifetime Achievement recipient and presents the award for Best Rap Album.
- Ben Roethlisberger - Introduces a performance by Kelly Clarkson.
- Billie Joe Armstrong and Gwen Stefani - Presents the award for Best Rock Album.
- Ellen DeGeneres - Introduces a performance by Paul McCartney.
- The Black Eyed Peas and Jennifer Love Hewitt - Pays tribute to Chris Blackwell and presents the award for Best Male R&B Vocal Performance.
- Teri Hatcher and Michael Buble - Presents the award for Best Pop Vocal Album.
- Jenna Elfman - Pays tribute to Trustee Award recipient Owen Bradley and introduces a performance by Keith Urban.
- Chris Brown and Carlos Santana - Pays tribute to President's Merit award winner Mo Ostin and presents the award for Best Rap/Sung Collaboration.
- Dave Chappelle - Introduces the Sly Stone tribute.
- LL Cool J - Pays tribute to Robert Johnson as the Lifetime Achievement recipient and introduces a performance by Jay-Z and Linkin Park.
- Tom Hanks - Pays tribute to The Weavers as the Lifetime Achievement recipient and presents a performance by Bruce Springsteen.
- Destiny's Child - Presents the award for Song of the Year.
- Sheryl Crow and Sting - Pays tribute to Cream (band) as the Lifetime Achievement recipient and present the award for Record of the Year.
- Terrence Howard - Pays tribute to Jessye Norman and introduces a performance by Herbie Hancock and Christina Aguilera.
- Fiona Apple, Chuck D, and Common - Presents the award for Best New Artist.
- Queen Latifah - Pays tribute to Richard Pryor as the Lifetime Achievement recipient.
- Bonnie Raitt and James Taylor - Presents the award for Album of the Year.
- Neil Portnow - Talks about MusicCares efforts in the Gulf Coast.

== Award winners ==
U2 was the night's top winner, with five awards. Their win for Album of the Year was their second win for that particular award. They previously won it back in 1988 for The Joshua Tree. They are the only rock act to have more than one Album of the Year win.

Top nominees included Mariah Carey, John Legend and Kanye West with eight each, but won only three awards each. Kelly Clarkson won two awards, becoming the first American Idol contestant ever to win a Grammy.

Multiple award winners (awards won/nominated):

- U2 — 5/5
- Alison Krauss — 3/3
- Mariah Carey — 3/8
- John Legend — 3/8
- Kanye West — 3/8
- Kelly Clarkson — 2/2
- The Chemical Brothers — 2/2
- Stevie Wonder — 2/4

=== General ===
Record of the Year

- "Boulevard of Broken Dreams" – Green Day
  - Rob Cavallo & Green Day, producers; Chris Lord-Alge & Doug McKean, engineers/mixers
- "We Belong Together" – Mariah Carey
  - Mariah Carey, Jermaine Dupri & Manuel Seal, producers; Brian Garten, John Horesco IV & Phil Tan, engineers/mixers
- "Feel Good Inc." – Gorillaz featuring De La Soul
  - Cox, Danger Mouse, Dring & Gorillaz, producers; Jason Cox, Danger Mouse & Gorillaz, engineers/mixers
- "Hollaback Girl" – Gwen Stefani
  - The Neptunes, producers; Andrew Coleman & Phil Tan, engineers/mixers
- "Gold Digger" – Kanye West
  - Jon Brion & Kanye West, producers; Tom Biller, Andrew Dawson, Mike Dean & Anthony Kilhoffer, engineers/mixers

Album of the Year

- How to Dismantle an Atomic Bomb – U2
  - Brian Eno, Flood, Daniel Lanois, Jacknife Lee, Steve Lillywhite & Chris Thomas, producers; Greg Collins, Flood, Carl Glanville, Simon Gogerly, Nellee Hooper, Jacknife Lee & Steve Lillywhite, engineers/mixers; Arnie Acosta, mastering engineer
- The Emancipation of Mimi – Mariah Carey
  - Mariah Carey, Bryan-Michael Cox, Jermaine Dupri, Young Genius, Scram Jones, The Legendary Traxster, LROC, The Neptunes, James Poyser, Manuel Seal, Kanye West & James "Big Jim" Wright, producers; Dana Jon Chappelle, Jermaine Dupri, Bryan Frye, Brian Garten, John Horesco IV, Manny Marroquin, Mike Pierce, Phil Tan & Pat "Pat 'Em Down" Viala, engineers/mixers; Herb Powers, mastering engineer
- Chaos and Creation in the Backyard – Paul McCartney
  - Nigel Godrich, producer; Darrell Thorp, engineer/mixer; Alan Yoshida, mastering engineer
- Love. Angel. Music. Baby. – Gwen Stefani
  - André 3000, Dallas Austin, Dr. Dre, Nellee Hooper, Jimmy Jam, Tony Kanal, Terry Lewis, The Neptunes, Linda Perry & Johnny Vulture, producers; André 3000, Andrew Coleman, Greg Collins, Ian Cross, Dr. Dre, John Frye, Simon Gogerly, Mauricio "Veto" Iragorri, Matt Marin, Colin "Dog" Mitchell, Pete Novak, Ian Rossiter, Rick Sheppard, Mark "Spike" Stent, Phil Tan & Johnny Vulture, engineers/mixers; Brian "Big Bass" Gardner, mastering engineer
- Late Registration – Kanye West
  - Jon Brion, Warryn "Baby Dubb" Campbell, Just Blaze, Devo Springsteen & Kanye West, producers; Craig Bauer, Tom Biller, Andrew Dawson, Mike Dean, Anthony Kilhoffer, Manny Marroquin, Richard Reitz & Brian Sumner, engineers/mixers; Vlado Meller, mastering engineer

Song of the Year

- "Sometimes You Can't Make It on Your Own"
  - U2, songwriters (U2)
- "Bless the Broken Road"
  - Bobby Boyd, Jeff Hannah & Marcus Hummon, songwriters (Rascal Flatts)
- "Devils & Dust"
  - Bruce Springsteen, songwriter (Bruce Springsteen)
- "Ordinary People"
  - W. Adams & J. Stephens, songwriters (John Legend)
- "We Belong Together"
  - J. Austin, M. Carey, J. Dupri & M. Seal, songwriters; (D. Bristol, K. Edmonds, S. Johnson, P. Moten, S. Sully & B. Womack, songwriters) (Mariah Carey)

Best New Artist

- John Legend
- Ciara
- Fall Out Boy
- Keane
- Sugarland

=== Alternative ===
Best Alternative Music Album

- Get Behind Me Satan – The White Stripes
- Funeral – Arcade Fire
- Guero – Beck
- Plans – Death Cab for Cutie
- You Could Have It So Much Better – Franz Ferdinand

=== Blues ===
Best Traditional Blues Album

- 80 - B. B. King & Friends

Best Contemporary Blues Album

- Cost of Living - Delbert McClinton

=== Children's ===
Best Musical Album for Children's music

- Songs from the Neighborhood - The Music of Mister Rogers
  - Dennis Scott (producer) (various artists)

Best Spoken Word Album for Children

- Marlo Thomas & Friends: Thanks & Giving All Year Long
  - Christopher Cerf & Marlo Thomas (producers) (various artists)

=== Classical ===
Best Orchestral Performance

- Shostakovich: Sym. No. 13" – Mariss Jansons (conductor), Sergey Aleksashkin, Chor des Bayerischen Runfunks, Symphonieorchester des Bayerischen Rundfunks

Best Classical Vocal Performance

- "Bach: Cantatas" – Thomas Quasthoff (soloist, performer), Jürgen Bulgrin & Rainer Maillard (engineers), Christopher Alder (producer)

Best Opera Recording

- "Verdi: Falstaff" – Sir Colin Davis (conductor), Carlos Alvarez, Bülent Bezdüz, Marina Domashenko, Jane Henschel, Ana Ibarra, Maria Josè Moreno & Michele Pertusi, James Mallinson (producer), London Symphony Chorus, London Symphony Orchestra

Best Choral Performance

- "Bolcom: Songs of Innocence and of Experience" – Leonard Slatkin (conductor) & Jerry Blackstone, William Hammer, Jason Harris, Christopher Kiver, Carole Ott & Mary Alice Stollak (choir directors)
  - (Christine Brewer, Measha Brueggergosman, Ilana Davidson, Nmon Ford, Linda Hohenfeld, Joan Morris, Carmen Pelton, Marietta Simpson & Thomas Young, Michigan State University Children's Choir, University of Michigan Chamber Choir, University of Michigan Orpheus Singers, University of Michigan University Choir & University Musical Society Choral Union, University of Michigan School of Music, Theatre & Dance Symphony Orchestra)

Best Instrumental Soloist(s) Performance (with orchestra)

- "Beethoven: Piano Concertos Nos. 2 & 3" – Claudio Abbado (conductor), Martha Argerich & the Mahler Chamber Orchestra

Best Instrumental Soloist Performance (without orchestra)

- "Scriabin, Medtner, Stravinsky" – Evgeny Kissin

Best Small Ensemble Performance (with or without conductor)

  - "Boulez: Le marteau sans maître, Dérive 1 & 2" – Hilary Summers, Ensemble InterContemporain
  - Pierre Boulez (conductor)

Best Chamber Music Performance

- "Mendelssohn: The Complete String Quartets" – Emerson String Quartet

Best Classical Contemporary Composition

- Bolcom: Songs of Innocence and of Experience
  - William Bolcom (composer) (Leonard Slatkin)

Best Classical Album

- "Bolcom: Songs of Innocence and of Experience" – Tim Handley (producer), Leonard Slatkin (conductor), Jerry Blackstone, William Hammer, Jason Harris, Christopher Kiver, Carole Ott & Marie Alice Stollack (choir directors), Christie Brewer and Joan Morris & University of Michigan School of Music Symphony Orchestra

Best Classical Crossover Album

- "4 + Four" – Turtle Island String Quartet & Ying Quartet

=== Comedy ===
Best Comedy Album

- Never Scared – Chris Rock

=== Composition and arrangement ===
Awards for composing and arranging:

Best Instrumental Composition

- Into the Light
  - Billy Childs (composer) (Billy Childs Ensemble)

Best Instrumental Arrangement

- The Incredits (from The Incredibles soundtrack)
  - Gordon Goodwin (arranger) (Various Artists)

Best Instrumental Arrangement Accompanying Vocalist(s)

- What Are You Doing the Rest of Your Life?
  - Billy Childs, Gil Goldstein & Heitor Pereira (arrangers) (Chris Botti & Sting)

=== Country ===
Best Female Country Vocal Performance

- "The Connection" – Emmylou Harris

Best Male Country Vocal Performance

- "You'll Think of Me" – Keith Urban

Best Country Performance by a Duo or Group with Vocal

- "Restless" – Alison Krauss and Union Station

Best Country Collaboration with Vocals

- "Like We Never Loved At All" – Faith Hill & Tim McGraw

Best Country Instrumental Performance

- "Unionhouse Branch" – Alison Krauss and Union Station

Best Country Song

- "Bless the Broken Road" – Rascal Flatts
  - Bobby Boyd, Jeff Hanna & Marcus Hummon (songwriters)

Best Country Album

- Lonely Runs Both Ways – Alison Krauss and Union Station

Best Bluegrass Album

- The Company We Keep – Del McCoury Band

=== Dance ===
Best Dance Recording

- "Galvanize" – The Chemical Brothers featuring Q-Tip
  - The Chemical Brothers, producers; The Chemical Brothers & Steve Dub, mixers
- "Say Hello" – Deep Dish
  - Ali "Dubfire" Shirazinia & Sharam Tayebi, producers; Deep Dish & Matt Nordstrom, mixers
- "Wonderful Night" – Fatboy Slim & Lateef
  - Fatboy Slim, producer; Simon Thornton, mixer
- "Daft Punk Is Playing at My House" – LCD Soundsystem
  - The DFA, producers; The DFA & Andy Wallace, mixers
- "I Believe In You" – Kylie Minogue
  - Babydaddy & Jake Shears, producers; Jeremy Wheatly, mixer
- "Guilt Is A Useless Emotion" – New Order
  - New Order & Stuart Price, producers; New Order & Stuart Price, mixers

Best Electronic/Dance Album

- Push The Button – The Chemical Brothers
- Human After All – Daft Punk
- Palookaville – Fatboy Slim
- Minimum-Maximum – Kraftwerk
- LCD Soundsystem – LCD Soundsystem

=== Film, TV and visual media ===
Awards for soundtrack contributions:

Best Compilation Soundtrack Album for a Motion Picture, Television or Other Visual Media

- Ray – Ray Charles
  - James Austin, Stuart Benjamin & Taylor Hackford (compilation producers)

Best Score Soundtrack Album for a Motion Picture, Television or Other Visual Media

- Ray – Craig Armstrong (composer)

Best Song Written for a Motion Picture, Television or Other Visual Media

- "Believe" (from The Polar Express)
  - Glen Ballard & Alan Silvestri (songwriters) (Josh Groban)

=== Folk ===
Best Traditional Folk Album

- Fiddler's Green – Tim O'Brien
- Live From Dublin: A Tribute To Derek Bell – The Chieftains
- Come On Back – Jimmie Dale Gilmore
- Live In The UK – Tom Paxton
- Cajun Mardi Gras! – Jo-El Sonnier

Best Contemporary Folk Album

- Fair & Square – John Prine
- Chávez Ravine – Ry Cooder
- The Outsider – Rodney Crowell
- Why Should the Fire Die? – Nickel Creek
- Devils & Dust – Bruce Springsteen

Best Native American Music Album

- Sacred Ground: A Tribute to Mother Earth
  - Jim Wilson producer (various artists)

Best Hawaiian Music Album

- Masters of Hawaiian Slack Key Guitar – Vol. 1
  - Daniel Ho, Paul Konwiser & Wayne Wong, producers (Various Artists)

=== Gospel ===
Best Gospel Performance

- "Pray" – CeCe Winans

Best Gospel Song

- "Be Blessed" – Yolanda Adams
  - Yolanda Adams, James Harris III, Terry Lewis & James 'Big Jim' Wright, songwriters

Best Pop/Contemporary Gospel Album

- Lifesong – Casting Crowns

Best Rock Gospel Album

- Until My Heart Caves In – Audio Adrenaline

Best Southern, Country or Bluegrass Gospel Album

- Rock of Ages...Hymns & Faith – Amy Grant

Best Traditional Soul Gospel Album

- Psalms, Hymns & Spiritual Songs – Donnie McClurkin

Best Contemporary Soul Gospel Album

- Purified – CeCe Winans

Best Gospel Choir or Chorus Album

- One Voice – Saints Unified Voices
  - Gladys Knight, choir director

=== Historical ===
Best Historical Album

- Jelly Roll Morton: The Complete Library of Congress Recordings
  - Alan Lomax, Jeffrey Greenberg & Anna Lomax Wood (compilation producers), Adam Ayan & Steve Rosenthal (mastering engineers) (Jelly Roll Morton)

=== Jazz ===
Best Jazz Instrumental Solo

- "Why Was I Born?" – Sonny Rollins

Best Jazz Instrumental Album, Individual or Group

- Beyond the Sound Barrier – Wayne Shorter Quartet

Best Large Jazz Ensemble Album

- Overtime – Dave Holland Big Band

Best Jazz Vocal Album

- Good Night, and Good Luck – Dianne Reeves

Best Contemporary Jazz Album

- The Way Up – Pat Metheny Group

Best Latin Jazz Album

- Listen Here! – Eddie Palmieri

=== Latin ===
Best Latin Pop Album

- Escucha – Laura Pausini

Best Traditional Tropical Latin Album

- Bebo De Cuba – Bebo Valdes

Best Mexican/Mexican-American Album

- México En La Piel – Luis Miguel

Best Latin Rock/Alternative Album

- Fijación Oral Vol. 1 – Shakira

Best Tejano Album

- Chicanisimo – Little Joe y la Familia

Best Salsa/Merengue Album

- Son Del Alma – Willy Chirino

=== Musical Show ===
Award for Musical theatre recording:

Best Musical Show Album

- Monty Python's Spamalot
  - John Du Prez & Eric Idle (producers & composers), Eric Idle (lyricist) (Original Broadway Cast including David Hyde Pierce, Tim Curry, Hank Azaria & Sara Ramirez)

=== Music video ===
Best Short Form Music Video

- Lose Control – Missy Elliott, Fat Man Scoop & Ciara
  - Missy Elliott & Dave Meyers (video directors) joseph Sasson (video producer)

Best Long Form Music Video

- No Direction Home – Bob Dylan
  - Margaret Bodde, Susan Lacy, Jeff Rosen, Martin Scorsese (video director), Nigel Sinclair & Anthony Wall (video producers)

=== New Age ===
Best New Age Album

- Silver Solstice – Paul Winter Consort
- Music in the Key of Om – Jack DeJohnette
- Scared Journey of Ku-Kai Volume 2 – Kitarō
- People of Peace – R. Carlos Nakai Quart
- Montana – A Love Story – George Winston

=== Packaging and notes ===
Best Recording Package

- The Forgotten Arm
  - Aimee Mann & Gail Marowitz (art directors) (Aimee Mann)

Best Boxed or Special Limited Edition Package

- The Legend
  - Ian Cuttler (art director) (Johnny Cash)

Best Album Notes

- The Complete Library of Congress Recordings
  - Alan Lomax, John Szwed (notes writer) (Jelly Roll Morton)

=== Polka ===
Best Polka Album

- Shake, Rattle and Polka! – Jimmy Sturr and his Orchestra
- Polka Pizzazz – Del Sinchak Band
- Under the Influence – James Sierzega
- Time Out for Polkas and Waltzes – Walter Ostanek & Ron Sluga
- Solecktions – Kevin Soleki

=== Pop ===
Best Female Pop Vocal Performance

- "Since U Been Gone" – Kelly Clarkson
- "It's Like That" – Mariah Carey
- "Good Is Good" – Sheryl Crow
- "I Will Not Be Broken" – Bonnie Raitt
- "Hollaback Girl" – Gwen Stefani

Best Male Pop Vocal Performance

- "From the Bottom of My Heart" – Stevie Wonder
- "Sitting, Waiting, Wishing" – Jack Johnson
- "Fine Line" – Paul McCartney
- "Walk On By" – Seal
- "Lonely No More" – Rob Thomas

Best Pop Performance by a Duo or Group with Vocal

- "This Love (Live)" – Maroon 5
- "Don't Lie" – The Black Eyed Peas
- "Mr. Brightside" – The Killers
- "More Than Love" – Los Lonely Boys
- "My Doorbell" – The White Stripes

Best Pop Collaboration with Vocals

- "Feel Good Inc." – Gorillaz & De La Soul
- "Gone Going" – The Black Eyed Peas & Jack Johnson
- "Virginia Moon" – Foo Fighters & Norah Jones
- "A Song For You" – Herbie Hancock & Christina Aguilera
- "A Time to Love" – Stevie Wonder & India.Arie

Best Pop Instrumental Performance

- "Caravan" – Les Paul
- "In Our Time" – Burt Bacharach & Chris Botti
- "T-Jam" – George Duke
- "Gelo na Montanha" – Herbie Hancock & Trey Anastasio
- "Agave" – Daniel Lanois

Best Pop Instrumental Album

- At This Time – Burt Bacharach
- Bloom – Eric Johnson
- Naked Guitar – Earl Klugh
- Belladonna – Daniel Lanois
- Flipside – Jeff Lorber

Best Pop Vocal Album

- Breakaway – Kelly Clarkson
- Extraordinary Machine – Fiona Apple
- Wildflower – Sheryl Crow
- Chaos and Creation in the Backyard – Paul McCartney
- Love. Angel. Music. Baby. – Gwen Stefani

=== Production and engineering ===
Awards for production and engineering:

Best Engineered Album, Non-Classical

- Back Home
  - Alan Douglas & Mick Guzauski engineers (Eric Clapton)

Best Engineered Album, Classical

- Mendelssohn: The Complete String Quartets
  - Da-Hong Seetoo engineer (Emerson String Quartet)

Best Remixed Recording, Non-Classical

- Superfly (Louie Vega EOL Mix)
  - Louie Vega (remixer) (Curtis Mayfield)

Producer of the Year, Non-Classical

- Steve Lillywhite

Producer of the Year, Classical

- Tim Handley

=== R&B ===
Best Female R&B Vocal Performance

- "We Belong Together" – Mariah Carey
- "1 Thing" – Amerie
- "Free Yourself" – Fantasia
- "Unbreakable" – Alicia Keys
- "Wishing on a Star" – Beyoncé

Best Male R&B Vocal Performance

- "Ordinary People" – John Legend
- "So What the Fuss" – Stevie Wonder
- "Creepin'" – Jamie Foxx
- "Let Me Love You" – Mario
- "Superstar" – Usher

Best R&B Performance by a Duo or Group with Vocals

- "So Amazing" – Beyoncé & Stevie Wonder
- "Cater 2 U" – Destiny's Child
- "How Will I Know" – Stevie Wonder & Aisha Morris
- "If This World Were Mine" – Alicia Keys & Jermaine Paul
- "So High" – John Legend & Lauryn Hill

Best R&B Song

- "We Belong Together" – Mariah Carey
  - Mariah Carey, Jermaine Dupri, Manuel Seal, & Johnta Austin songwriters
- "Cater 2 U" – Destiny's Child
  - Rodney Jerkins, Beyoncé Knowles, Ricky Lewis, Kelly Rowland, Robert Waller & Michelle Williams songwriters
- "Free Yourself" – Fantasia
  - Craig Brockman, Missy Elliott & Nisan Stewart songwriters
- "Ordinary People" – John Legend
  - W.Adams & J.Stephens songwriters
- "Unbreakable" – Alicia Keys
  - Garry Glenn, Alicia Keys, Harold Lily, & Kanye West songwriters

Best R&B Album

- "Get Lifted" – John Legend
- "Free Yourself" – Fantasia
- "Illumination" – Earth, Wind & Fire
- "A Time to Love" – Stevie Wonder
- "Unplugged" – Alicia Keys

Best Contemporary R&B Album

- The Emancipation of Mimi – Mariah Carey
- Touch – Amerie
- Destiny Fulfilled – Destiny's Child
- Turning Point – Mario
- O – Omarion

Best Traditional R&B Vocal Performance

- A House Is Not a Home – Aretha Franklin

Best Urban/Alternative Performance

- Welcome to Jamrock – Damian Marley

=== Rap ===
Best Rap Solo Performance

- "Gold Digger" – Kanye West
- "Testify" – Common
- "Mockingbird" – Eminem
- "Disco Inferno" – 50 Cent
- "Number One Spot" – Ludacris
- "U Don't Know Me" – T.I.

Best Rap Performance by a Duo or Group

- "Don't Phunk With My Heart" – The Black Eyed Peas
- "The Corner" – Common featuring The Last Poets
- "Encore" – Eminem featuring Dr. Dre & 50 Cent
- "Hate It or Love It" – The Game featuring 50 Cent
- "Wait (The Whisper Song)" – Ying Yang Twins

Best Rap/Sung Collaboration

- "Numb/Encore" – Jay-Z featuring Linkin Park
- "1, 2 Step" – Ciara featuring Missy Elliott
- "They Say" – Common featuring John Legend & Kanye West
- "Soldier" – Destiny's Child featuring T.I. & Lil Wayne
- "Rich Girl" – Gwen Stefani featuring Eve

Best Rap Song

- "Diamonds from Sierra Leone"
  - D. Harris & Kanye West, songwriters (J. Barry & D. Black, songwriters) (Kanye West)
- "Candy Shop"
  - Curtis Jackson & Scott Storch, songwriters (50 Cent featuring Olivia)
- "Don't Phunk with My Heart"
  - William Adams, Printz Board, Stacy Ferguson & George Pajon, Jr. songwriters (Kalyanji Anandji, Full Force & Indeewar, songwriters) (The Black Eyed Peas)
- "Hate It or Love It"
  - Curtis Jackson, A. Lyon, Jayceon Taylor & M. Valenzano, songwriters; (Baker, Felder & Harris, songwriters) (The Game featuring 50 Cent)
- "Lose Control"
  - M. Elliott, C. Harris & G. Isaacs III, songwriters; (J. Atkins, R. Davis & C. Hudson, songwriters) (Missy Elliott featuring Ciara & Fat Man Scoop)

Best Rap Album

- Late Registration – Kanye West
- Be – Common
- The Cookbook – Missy Elliott
- Encore – Eminem
- The Massacre – 50 Cent

=== Reggae ===
Best Reggae Album

- Welcome to Jamrock – Damian Marley
- Our Music – Burning Spear
- The Trinity – Sean Paul
- Clothes Drop – Shaggy
- Black Gold & Green – Third World

=== Rock ===
Best Solo Rock Vocal Performance

- "Devils & Dust" – Bruce Springsteen
- "Revolution" – Eric Clapton
- "Shine It All Around" – Robert Plant
- "This Is How a Heart Breaks" – Rob Thomas
- "The Painter" – Neil Young

Best Rock Performance by a Duo or Group with Vocal

- "Sometimes You Can't Make It on Your Own" – U2
- "Speed Of Sound" – Coldplay
- "Best of You" – Foo Fighters
- "Do You Want To" – Franz Ferdinand
- "All These Things That I've Done" – The Killers

Best Hard Rock Performance

- "B.Y.O.B." – System of a Down
- "Doesn't Remind Me" – Audioslave
- "The Hand That Feeds" – Nine Inch Nails
- "Tin Pan Valley" – Robert Plant
- "Little Sister" – Queens of the Stone Age

Best Metal Performance

- "Before I Forget" – Slipknot
- "The Great Satan" – Ministry
- "Determined" – Mudvayne
- "Mein Teil" – Rammstein
- "What Drives the Weak" – Shadows Fall

Best Rock Instrumental Performance

- "69 Freedom Specials" – Les Paul & Friends
- "Beat Box Guitar" – Adrian Belew
- "Birds of Prey" – Stewart Copeland
- "Mercy" – Joe Perry
- "Lotus Feet" – Steve Vai

Best Rock Song

- "City of Blinding Lights" – U2
  - Bono, Adam Clayton, The Edge & Larry Mullen songwriters
- "Speed of Sound" – Coldplay
  - Guy Berryman, Jonny Buckland, Will Champion, Chris Martin songwriters
- "Best of You" – Foo Fighters
  - Foo Fighters songwriters
- Devils & Dust" – Bruce Springsteen
  - Bruce Springsteen songwriter
- "Beverly Hills" – Weezer
  - Rivers Cuomo songwriter

Best Rock Album

- How to Dismantle an Atomic Bomb – U2
- X&Y – Coldplay
- In Your Honor – Foo Fighters
- A Bigger Bang – The Rolling Stones
- Prairie Wind – Neil Young

=== Surround Sound ===
Best Surround Sound Album

- Brothers in Arms – 20 Anniversary Edition
  - Chuck Ainlay (surround mix engineer), Bob Ludwig (surround mastering engineer), Chuck Ainlay, Mark Knopfler (surround producers) (Dire Straits)

=== Spoken word ===
Best Spoken Word Album

- Dreams from My Father – Barack Obama

=== Traditional Pop ===
Best Traditional Pop Vocal Album

- The Art of Romance – Tony Bennett
- It's Time – Michael Bublé
- Isn't It Romantic: The Standards Album – Johnny Mathis
- Moonlight Serenade – Carly Simon
- Thanks for the Memory: The Great American Songbook, Volume IV – Rod Stewart

=== World ===
Best Traditional World Music Album

- In the Heart of the Moon – Ali Farka Touré & Toumani Diabate

Best Contemporary World Music Album

- Eletracústico – Gilberto Gil

== Special Merit Awards ==
=== MusiCares Person of the Year ===
- James Taylor

=== Grammy Trustees Award ===
- Chris Blackwell
- Owen Bradley
- Al Schmitt

== In Memoriam ==
- Long John Baldry, Renaldo "Obie" Benson, Clarence "Gatemouth" Brown, Oscar Brown, R. L. Burnside, Little Milton Campbell, Vassar Clements, Tyrone Davis, Victoria de los Ángeles, Ibrahim Ferrer, Carlo Maria Giulini, Lalo Guerrero, Percy Heath, Skitch Henderson, Milt Holland, Shirley Horn, Willie Hutch, Johnnie Johnson, Merle Kilgore, Chris LeDoux, Harold Leventhal, Jimmy Martin, Robert Moog, Birgit Nilsson, Wilson Pickett, John Raitt, Lou Rawls, Eugene Record, Bobby Short, Jimmy Smith, Sammi Smith, Luther Vandross, Simon Waronker, Chris Whitley, Ronald Winans, Paul Winchell, Link Wray and Richard Pryor.

== Trivia ==
- U2's win for Album of the Year was their second win for that respective award. They previously won it back at the 30th Annual Grammy Awards in 1988 for The Joshua Tree. They are the only rock act to have more than one Album of the Year win.
- Keith Urban won his first Grammy Award for "You'll Think of Me" From his 2002 album Golden Road
- During the Sly & the Family Stone tribute performance Rusty Allen was in place of the original bassist Larry Graham.
- Sly Stone made his first public Appearance since 1987 wearing a Cockatoo-Style mohawk
- While presenting Best Female Pop Vocal Performance Alicia Keys & Stevie Wonder led a sing-along of "Higher Ground".
- Slipknot's win for "Before I Forget" was their first Grammy Award win.

== Notes ==
- Steven Tyler & Joe Perry are from Aerosmith.
- "In the Midnight Hour" is originally sung by Wilson Pickett.
- "A Song for You is originally performed by Andy Williams from his 1971 album "You've Got a Friend". The song was written by Leon Russell.
- Neil Portnow made an appearance
