= Number One (John Legend song) =

Single by John Legend featuring Kanye West

from the album Get Lifted
- Released: September 23, 2005
- Recorded: 2004
- Genre: R&B; soul; hip hop
- Length: 3:18
- Label: GOOD; Sony Urban; Columbia
- Songwriters: John Stephens; Kanye West
- Producer: Kanye West

John Legend singles chronology
"Ordinary People" (2005)	"Number One" (2005)	"So High" (2005)

Kanye West singles chronology
"Gold Digger" (2005)	"Number One" (2005)	"Extravaganza" (2005)

"Number One" is the third single released from R&B singer John Legend's album Get Lifted. It features Kanye West and contains a sample of the song "Let's Do It Again" by The Staple Singers. It is a hip hop and R&B song.

== Track listing ==
=== CD maxi-single ===
1. "Number One" (Clean Edit) (featuring Kanye West) - 3:20
2. "Number One" (featuring Kanye West) - 3:20
3. "Number One" (Instrumental) - 3:29
4. "Number One" (Clean Edit, Acapella, No Rap) - 2:43

== Charts ==
Chart (2005)	Peak position
UK Singles (OCC)	62
US Hot R&B/Hip-Hop Songs (Billboard)	86
