= Alliance for Positive Change =

Alliance for Positive Change (formerly AIDS Service Center NYC)
- Founded: 1990
- Founder: Sharen Duke
- Purpose: HIV/AIDS
- Location: New York City
- Employees: 95
- Website: alliance.nyc

Alliance for Positive Change - formerly known as AIDS Service Center NYC (ASCNYC) - is a community organization that helps New Yorkers living with HIV and other chronic illnesses. Founded in 1990 by CEO Sharen Duke, Alliance provides direct services to over 1,800 New Yorkers per year, while its peer education programs and community outreach initiatives reach an additional 18,000. In 2017, the organization formally changed its name to The Alliance for Positive Change. This change came as the nonprofit expanded to help more New Yorkers with substance use and mental health issues, and program participants with chronic illnesses such as hepatitis, diabetes, and heart disease.

== History ==
Based in midtown New York, Alliance partnered with the Keith Haring Foundation to open the Keith Haring ASC Harlem Center in 2010 and opened CASA Washington Heights to serve New York's Washington Heights community in 2011. In 2016, the Lower East Side Harm Reduction Center joined Alliance. Alliance currently has six locations, which includes: Pelham Grand Supportive Housing in the Bronx and the Luis & Lillian Outreach Center on the Lower East Side.

Alliance partners with New York hospitals, such as Mount Sinai Hospital, New York, and New York-Presbyterian Hospital for care coordination and case management for patients with HIV/AIDS. Alliance is a member of the Federation of Protestant Welfare Agencies.

In 2009, singer John Legend gave Alliance permission to remix his song "If You're Out There" to create a music video promoting HIV/AIDS awareness and testing. The video was launched at Alliance's annual Safer Sex in the City fundraiser.

Alliance programs and services promote the well-being, empowerment, and stability of persons living with HIV/AIDS and other chronic illnesses. Program highlights include:

- Peer Training Institute annually trains over 350 people affected by HIV/AIDS, Hepatitis C, and substance use to be prevention and harm reduction Peer Interns
- Comprehensive care coordination for 3,983 people living with chronic conditions in 2021, including medical, housing, substance abuse treatment, translation assistance, mental health services, entitlements advocacy, and childcare aid
- LES Harm Reduction Center provides harm reduction services for over 1,500 individuals and distributed almost 203,000 sterile syringes in 2021.
- Reentry support services for over 214 men and women in 2021
- Basic needs program that provides over 30,000 meals, as well as clothes, hygiene kits, food pantry items, and emergency aid to individuals and families annually
- Specialized support and care navigation services for 1,582 women in 2021
- 25 weekly support groups, educational workshops, and recreational activities

Alliance regularly participates in Dining Out For Life each April, partnering with restaurants to raise funds to support HIV/AIDS-focused organizations. In 2019, Alliance launched Manhattan HOPE in partnership with the NYPD and New York County District Attorney's Office. Under the program, persons arrested for possessing a controlled substance can avoid prosecution if they complete minimal requirements through our free diversion program. And in June 2019, Alliance launched, Alliance on the Move, a mobile van that heads to communities across the city to provide free, life-saving HIV testing, prevention, health care, and harm reduction services.
