= A Time to Love (album) =

2005 studio album by Stevie Wonder

Studio album by Stevie Wonder
- Released: September 27, 2005
- Recorded: 2004–2005
- Length: 77:39
- Label: Motown
- Producer: Stevie Wonder

Stevie Wonder chronology
The Definitive Collection (2002)	A Time to Love (2005)	The Complete Stevie Wonder (2005)

Singles from A Time to Love
- 1. "So What the Fuss" Released: 2005; 2. "From the Bottom of My Heart" Released: 2006

A Time to Love is the twenty-third studio album by Stevie Wonder, his first since Conversation Peace in 1995. Originally to have been completed in 2004, it was finally released to stores on October 18, 2005, following an exclusive digital release on Apple's iTunes Music Store on September 27.

The first single, issued in April 2005, was "So What the Fuss", which featured Prince on guitar and En Vogue on backing vocals. Follow-up singles included "Positivity" with his daughter Aisha Morris, "From the Bottom of My Heart" and "Shelter in the Rain".

The song "Shelter in the Rain" was in tribute to his first wife, the singer Syreeta Wright, who died of cancer the year before the album was released. Wonder was quoted as saying he would have had Wright singing lead on it had she lived.

Though multiple follow-ups have been announced as being in various stages of development, A Time to Love stands as Wonder's most recent album to date.

== Reception ==
Professional ratings
Aggregate scores
Source	Rating
Metacritic	66/100
Review scores
Source	Rating
AllMusic	4/5 stars
Blender	4/5 stars
Entertainment Weekly	C
Los Angeles Times	2.5/4 stars
Pitchfork	7.4/10
PopMatters	7/10
Robert Christgau	A−
Rolling Stone	3/5 stars
Slant	2.5/5 stars
Stylus	B−

The album was received with generally positive reviews, despite its having been delayed several times during the year of its release. In 2005, Wonder won the Best Male Pop Vocal Performance in the Grammy Awards for "From the Bottom of My Heart", his fourth win in this category.

== Commercial performance ==
A Time to Love debuted at number 5 on the US Billboard 200, selling 121,000 copies in its first week. It was certified gold by the Recording Industry Association of America on December 15, 2005.

As of August 2007, the album had sales 469,000 copies in the United States according to Nielsen SoundScan.

== Track listing ==
All tracks are written by Stevie Wonder, except where noted.

No.	Title	Writer(s)	Length
1.	"If Your Love Cannot Be Moved" (featuring Kim Burrell)		6:12
2.	"Sweetest Somebody I Know"		4:31
3.	"Moon Blue"	Wonder, Akosua Busia	6:45
4.	"From the Bottom of My Heart"		5:12
5.	"Please Don't Hurt My Baby"		4:40
6.	"How Will I Know" (featuring Aisha Morris)		3:39
7.	"My Love Is on Fire" (featuring Hubert Laws on flute)		6:16
8.	"Passionate Raindrops"		4:50
9.	"Tell Your Heart I Love You"		4:30
10.	"True Love"		3:32
11.	"Shelter in the Rain"		4:19
12.	"So What the Fuss" (featuring En Vogue and Prince on guitar)		5:04
13.	"Can't Imagine Love Without You"		3:45
14.	"Positivity" (featuring Aisha Morris)		5:07
15.	"A Time to Love" (featuring India Arie and Paul McCartney on guitar)	Wonder, Arie	9:17
Total length:			77:39

== Personnel ==
=== Music ===
- Thomassina Atkins – choir/chorus
- Francis Awe – talking drum
- Kimberly Brewer – background vocals
- Shirley Brewer – background vocals
- Kim Burrell – primary vocals
- Teddy Campbell – drums
- Mabvuto Carpenter – background vocals
- Jherimi Leigh Carter – choir/chorus
- Wendell Kelly – trombone
- Oscar Castro-Neves – guitar
- Ayrianna Cerant – choir/chorus
- Swapan Chaudhuri – tabla
- Gregory Curtis – background vocals
- Monique DeBarge – background vocals
- DeVere Duckett – background vocals
- Nathan East – bass guitar
- Kevon Edmonds – background vocals
- Lynne Fiddmont – background vocals
- Brianna Ford – choir/chorus
- Doug E. Fresh – beat box
- Patrick Gandy – conductor, orchestration
- Richie Gajate Garcia – congas/hand percussion
- Tony Gates – choir/chorus
- Daronn Gooden – choir/chorus
- Timothy Hall – choir/chorus
- Kenya Hathaway – background vocals
- India.Arie – composer, primary artist
- Herman Jackson – bells, keyboard
- Phillip "Taj" Jackson – background vocals
- Keith John – background vocals
- Accalra Johnson – choir/chorus
- Desarae Johnson – choir/chorus
- Timothy Jon Johnson – background vocals
- Unique Johnson – choir/chorus
- Chatoya Jones – choir/chorus
- Erica L. King – choir/chorus
- Abbos Kosimov – doira
- Debra Laws – background vocals
- Hubert Laws – flute
- Ricky Lawson – drums
- Paul McCartney – acoustic/electric guitar
- Melody McCully – background vocals
- Brijee McDowell – choir/chorus
- Sebastian Mego – choir/chorus, background vocals
- Kristie Mingo – background vocals
- Aisha Morris – primary artist
- Woody Murray – vibraphone
- Traci Nelson – background vocals
- Morris O'Connor – guitar
- Conesha Owens – background vocals
- Greg Phillinganes – electric piano
- Mike Phillips – saxophone
- Doc Powell – guitar
- Prince – guitar
- Bryan Sledge – choir/chorus
- Amir Sofi – darbouka
- Lamont Van Hook – background vocals
- Nathan Watts – bass
- Andy Weiner – conductor, orchestration, string arrangements
- Willie Wheaton, Jr. – background vocals
- Fred White – background vocals
- Johneisha White – choir/chorus
- Tamiko Whitsett – background vocals
- Barbara Wilson – background vocals
- Sherman B. Wilson – choir/chorus
- LaLynda Winfield – choir/chorus
- LaShanea Winfield – choir/chorus
- LaShanique Winfield – choir/chorus
- Stevie Wonder – arranger, art conception, audio production, bass, bells, bongos, chimes, clapping, clavinet, composer, drawing, drum loop, drums, editing, Fender Rhodes, finger cymbals, flexatones, flute arrangement, guitar loops, hand percussion, harmonica, keyboard guitar, keyboards, marimba, Moog bass, organ, percussion, piano, piano (electric), primary artist, producer, programming, rhythm section, sequencing arranger, string arrangements, synthesizer bass, tambourine, vocal arrangement, vocals (background), voice box

=== Production ===
- Gary Adante – engineer
- Stephanie Andrews – art conception, project coordinator
- Robert A. Arbittier – digital editing, editing, overdubs, programming
- David Blumberg – arranger
- Barry G. Clark – technical support
- Jeffrey Coprich – leader
- Tom Corwin – engineer, producer
- Greg Edenfield – engineer
- Scott Elgin – assistant
- Aaron Fessel – engineer
- Ernie Fields Jr. – contractor
- Kirk Franklin – arranger, producer
- Brian Gardner – mastering
- Evren Göknar – assistant
- John Holino – technical support
- Femi Jiya – engineer, mixing
- Steve Jones – programming
- Jim Keller – assistant
- Chris Kornmann – creative director
- Nick Marshall – assistant
- Rickey Minor – orchestra supervision, string arrangements
- Bobby Montez – assistant
- Scott Moore – assistant
- Francesco Perlangeli – assistant
- Neil Pogue – mixing
- Joel Poinsett – assistant
- Josean Posey – engineer
- Bonnie Raitt – producer
- Dave Reitzas – engineer
- Paul Riser – arranger
- Anthony Ruotolo – engineer
- Rafa Sardina – engineer
- Christine Sirois – assistant
- Ralph Sutton – engineer
- Heratch Touresian – programming
- Gregory Upshaw – wardrobe
- Peter Vargo – assistant
- Donnie Whittmore – assistant
- Val Williams – make-up
- Eddie Wolfl – photography

== Charts ==
Chart performance for A Time to Love
Chart (2005)	Peak position
Australian Albums (ARIA)	61
Belgian Albums (Ultratop Wallonia)	93
Danish Albums (Hitlisten)	15
Dutch Albums (Album Top 100)	51
Finnish Albums (Suomen virallinen lista)	27
French Albums (SNEP)	19
German Albums (Offizielle Top 100)	43
Italian Albums (FIMI)	16
Japanese Albums (Oricon)	12
Norwegian Albums (VG-lista)	9
Spanish Albums (Promusicae)	81
Swedish Albums (Sverigetopplistan)	9
Swiss Albums (Schweizer Hitparade)	24
UK Albums (Official Charts)	24
US Billboard 200	5

== Certifications ==
Certifications for A Time to Love
Region	Certification	Certified units/sales
Japan (RIAJ)	Gold	88,000
United Kingdom (BPI)	Silver	60,000^{^}
United States (RIAA)	Gold	500,000^{^}
^{^} Shipments figures based on certification alone.
