= Let's Do It Again (song) =

Single by the Staple Singers

from the album Let's Do It Again
- B-side: "After Sex"
- Released: October 13, 1975
- Genre: Soul
- Length: 3:30 (Single version); 4:52 (Album version)
- Label: Curtom
- Songwriter: Curtis Mayfield
- Producer: Curtis Mayfield

The Staple Singers singles chronology
"My Main Man" (1974)	"Let's Do It Again" (1975)	"New Orleans" (1976)

"Let's Do It Again" is a song by the Staple Singers. Written by Curtis Mayfield, it was part of the soundtrack for the Bill Cosby/Sidney Poitier film Let's Do It Again. The single reached the top of the Billboard Hot 100 singles chart on December 27, 1975, the day before Roebuck "Pops" Staples' 61st birthday, and also spent two non-consecutive weeks at the top of the Hot Soul Singles chart. It was the last major hit by the group.

R&B quartet Xscape sampled the song on their first single, the remix of "Just Kickin' It", from the 1993 album Hummin' Comin' at 'Cha, produced by Jermaine Dupri. Ice Cube sampled the song for the remix of "It Was a Good Day". It was also sampled in John Legend's song "Number One". It's also sampled on BJ the Chicago Kid's single "Good Luv'n". British R&B singer Lynden David Hall sampled the song on a track of the same name in his penultimate album The Other Side (2000). Cleveland, Ohio-based rap/hip-hop group Bone Thugs-n-Harmony sampled the song on the track "Do It Again" from their 2006 studio album Thug Stories.

== Charts ==
Chart (1975–1976)	Peak position
Australia (Kent Music Report)	97
Canada RPM Top Singles	7
US Billboard Hot 100	1
US Billboard Hot Soul Singles	1
