= Get Lifted =

Studio album by John Legend
- Released: December 28, 2004
- Recorded: 2001–2004
- Studios: Sound Images (Cincinnati, Ohio); Sony Music Studios (New York City); The Record Planet, Westlake Studios (Los Angeles, California); The Stewchia (Los Angeles, California); Studio Crash (Philadelphia, Pennsylvania)
- Genres: R&B; soul; neo soul; hip-hop soul
- Length: 52:28
- Labels: GOOD; Columbia; Sony Urban
- Producers: John Legend; Devo Springsteen; Dave Tozer; Kanye West; will.i.am

John Legend chronology
Get Lifted (2004)	Once Again (2006)

Singles from Get Lifted
- 1. "Used to Love U" Released: August 31, 2004; 2. "Ordinary People" Released: April 7, 2005; 3. "Number One" Released: August 23, 2005; 4. "So High" Released: December 8, 2005

Get Lifted is the debut studio album by American singer John Legend. It was released by GOOD Music, Sony Urban Music, and Columbia Records on December 28, 2004, in the United States. Executive production was handled by Legend's then-manager and GOOD Music label boss Kanye West, who also co-produced the album alongside Dave Tozer, will.i.am, and Devo Springsteen. The album also features guest appearances by West, Snoop Dogg and Miri Ben-Ari.

Get Lifted supported by four singles: "Used to Love U", "Ordinary People", "Number One" and "So High". The album received generally positive reviews from music critics. It debuted at number seven on the US Billboard 200 chart, selling 116,000 copies in its first week. The album later peaked at number four on the chart. At the 48th Annual Grammy Awards, the album won the award for Best R&B Album, and earned Legend another two awards, for Best New Artist and Best Male R&B Vocal Performance for his single "Ordinary People".

== Singles ==
The album was supported by four singles. The first single "Used to Love U" was released on August 31, 2004. The single received moderate commercial success, peaking at number 74 on the US Billboard Hot 100 chart. The second single "Ordinary People" was released on April 7, 2005, and became Legend's breakthrough hit. The song peaked within the top 40—at number 24—on the Billboard Hot 100, becoming Legend's first to do so. It also received success outside of the US; it peaked at number four on the UK Singles Chart and number one on the UK R&B Singles chart. "Ordinary People" also received three nominations at the 48th Annual Grammy Awards for Song of the Year, Best R&B Song and Best Male R&B Vocal Performance, ultimately winning the latter. The third single "Number One" was released on August 23, 2005. It failed to reach the Billboard Hot 100, but peaked at number 63 on the UK Singles Chart. The final single, "So High" was released on December 8, 2005. The song also failed to enter the Billboard Hot 100, although it reached number three on the Bubbling Under Hot 100.

== Critical reception ==
Professional ratings
Review scores
Source	Rating
AllMusic	3.5/5 stars
Blender	3/5 stars
Entertainment Weekly	A−
The Guardian	4/5 stars
NME	8/10
Pitchfork	8.8/10
Rolling Stone	4/5 stars
Spin	A−
USA Today	3.5/4 stars
Vibe	5/5

Get Lifted received generally positive reviews from music critics. BBC Music gave the album a favorable review and called it "an album that not only lived up to the hype, but rose squarely above it. Yes, at times it is a patchwork of the past filtered through Legend’s ever-present influences, but the quality of his writing and performance, and his collaborators’ contributions, make it worthy of the awards and plaudits it rightly received." Spin gave it an A− and said that Legend's voice "leans on subtlety more than melisma, and his sound has a crisp live-band jump, rather than canned neo-soul static." Uncut gave it three stars out of five and stated that Legend "introduces some intriguing new variations on the retro R&B template....Jeff Buckley is surprisingly brought to mind in Legend's passionately fragile delivery." IGN gave it a score of 9.3 out of ten and called it "a refreshing record that fans of music will adore." The Guardian gave it four stars out of five and called it "a real gem." Entertainment.ie also gave it four stars and said of Legend, "it's probably not surprising that he's got such a big head, seeing as his producer, hip-hop guru Kanye West, has described him as simply 'the future'. Actually, it would be much more accurate to say that he does a pretty good job of updating the past." In his Consumer Guide, Robert Christgau gave it a three-star honorable mention; he picked out two of the songs from the album ("I Can Change" and "Live It Up") and said of Legend, "For an ordinary soul man, he has excellent tunes."

musicOMH gave it an average review and stated that "Certain albums have the power to open the mind into different forms of music, and certainly those who pick up the Get Lifted with the pretence of it being a hip-hop album will have a rude awakening. I approached with trepidation after the opening Prelude but with an open mind or just an appreciation for the finer things in life Get Lifted could find itself being an essential album in anyone’s collection." Paste gave it a positive review and stated that it "has as much in common with the classic funk and soul of Isaac Hayes, Stevie Wonder and The Delfonics as it does with today’s best R&B, hip-hop and neo-soul." The A.V. Club gave it an average review and stated that the album "suffers from a surplus of slickness, but it's also seductive, and at just over 52 minutes, mercifully free from the excess and filler that characterize many rap and R&B albums." Exclaim!, however, gave it an unfavorable review and said, "The early line on Legend is that the heat this album will undoubtedly generate guarantees that Legend’s apparent fidelity issues will get worse before they get better. Get Lifted indeed." Plugged In (publication) gave it a mixed review and stated that "Legend is a talented singer and piano player but fails to maintain his moral focus. It doesn't take much profanity, infidelity and sexual inappropriateness to sink an otherwise decent effort."

Rhapsody ranked the album #10 on its "Best R&B Albums of the Decade" list, declaring, "John Legend was all over the Top 40 the entire decade—even before he released one of the decade’s biggest R&B debuts—having worked with Lauryn Hill, Alicia Keys, Kanye West and Jay-Z, to name a few. Get Lifted, his first proper release, is an infectious cross between old-school soul and neo-soul."

== Commercial performance ==
Get Lifted debuted at number seven on the US Billboard 200 chart, selling 116,000 copies in its first week. This became Legend's first US top-ten debut on the chart. In its second week, the album climbed to number four on the chart, selling an additional 75,000 copies. In its third week, the album remained to number four on the chart, selling 73,000 more copies. In its fourth week, the album dropped to number five on the chart, selling 62,000 copies. On October 13, 2020, the album was certified double platinum by the Recording Industry Association of America (RIAA) for combined sales and album-equivalent units of over two million units in the United States. To date, the album has sold a total of 2.1 million copies in the US and over three million units worldwide.

== Track listing ==
Get Lifted — Standard edition
No.	Title	Writer(s)	Producer(s)	Length
1.	"Prelude"	John Stephens	John Legend^{[a]}	0:44
2.	"Let's Get Lifted"	Stephens; Kanye West; Rick Shobin	Kanye West; Legend^{[a]}	3:37
3.	"Used to Love U"	Stephens; West	West; Legend^{[a]}	3:30
4.	"Alright"	Stephens; West	West; Legend^{[a]}	3:20
5.	"She Don't Have to Know"	Stephens; William Adams; Sylvester Stewart	will.i.am	4:52
6.	"Number One" (featuring Kanye West)	Stephens; West; Curtis Mayfield	West; Legend^{[a]}	3:18
7.	"I Can Change" (featuring Snoop Dogg)	Stephens; Dave Tozer; Calvin Broadus	Tozer; Legend^{[a]}	5:01
8.	"Ordinary People"	Stephens; Adams	Legend	4:41
9.	"Stay with You"	Stephens; Tozer	Tozer	3:49
10.	"Let's Get Lifted Again"	Stephens; Tozer	Tozer	2:18
11.	"So High"	Stephens; DeVon "Devo" Harris; Paul Cho; Leon Ware; Pam Sawyer	Harris	5:07
12.	"Refuge (When It's Cold Outside)"	Stephens; Harris; Cho	Harris; Cho^{[b]}	4:13
13.	"It Don't Have to Change" (featuring The Stephens Family)	Stephens; Tozer	Legend	3:23
14.	"Live It Up" (featuring Miri Ben-Ari)	Stephens; Harris; Tarrey Torae; A. Hester	Harris; Legend^{[a]}; West^{[a]}	4:35

Get Lifted (20th Anniversary)
No.	Title	Writer(s)	Producer(s)	Length
15.	"So High" (Cloud 9 Remix featuring Lauryn Hill)	Stephens; Harris; Cho; Hill	Harris; Wyclef Jean^{[b]}; Jerry "Wonda" Duplessis^{[b]}	5:07
16.	"Used to Love U" (9th Wonder Playmates Imagining Remix featuring Black Thought)	Stephens; West; Angela Winbush; Herman Chainey; René Moore; Tarik Luqmaan Trotter	West; Legend^{[a]}; 9th Wonder^{[b]}	3:29
17.	"Number One" (Obi Remix)	Stephens; West; Mayfield	West; Legend^{[a]}; Obi^{[b]}	3:11
18.	"Let's Get Lifted Again" (Man-Man Remix featuring Killer Mike and Lil Wayne)	Stephens; Tozer; Dwayne Carter; Michael Render	Tozer; Roberts^{[b]}	4:06
19.	"Ordinary People" (Man-Man Remix featuring Tems)	Stephens; Adams	Legend; Roberts^{[b]}	4:49
20.	"Refuge (When It's Cold Outside)" (Man-Man/The Imports Remix featuring Simi)	Stephens; Harris; Cho; Simisola Bolatito Ogunleye	Harris; Cho^{[b]}; The Imports^{[b]}; Roberts^{[b]}	3:13
21.	"Do What I Gotta Do"	Stephens; Kanye West; Clarence Paul; Morris Broadnax; Stevie Wonder	West; Tozer	3:17
22.	"She Don't Have to Know" (Man-Man Remix)	Stephens; Adams; Stewart	will.i.am; Roberts^{[b]}	4:50
23.	"Money Blown"	Stephens; Tozer	Tozer	4:40
24.	"Johnny's Gotta Go"	Stephens; Tozer	Legend	3:22
25.	"It Don't Have to Change" (Man-Man Remix featuring The Stephens Family)	Stephens; Tozer	Legend; Roberts^{[b]}	2:52
26.	"Just in Time"	Stephens	Tozer	5:28

Notes

- ^{^a} signifies co-producer
- ^{^b} signifies additional producer

Sample credits

- "She Don't Have to Know" contains replayed elements from the composition "Just Like a Baby" as written by Sylvester Stewart.
- "Number One" contains samples from the composition "Let's Do It Again" as written by Curtis Mayfield.
- "So High" contains samples from the composition "I Don't Need No Reason" as written by Leon Ware and Pam Sawyer.
- "Live It Up" contains interpolations from the composition "Love Is Missing from Our Lives" as written by Anthony Hester.
- "Do What I Gotta Do" contains samples from the composition "Until You Come Back to Me (That's What I'm Gonna Do)" as written by Clarence Paul, Morris Broadnax, and Stevie Wonder.

== Personnel ==
Credits adapted from album's liner notes.

- Candice Anderson — additional vocals (tracks 2, 4, 6)
- Pablo Arraya — assistant engineer (tracks 2–4, 6, 8, 13)
- Jose Barboza Jr. — tuba (track 4)
- Miri Ben-Ari — strings (tracks 3, 14), string production and arrangements (14)
- Printz Board — trumpet (track 3)
- Val Brathwaite — assistant engineer (tracks 2–4, 6, 8)
- Jason Carson — assistant engineer (tracks 9, 10)
- Paul Cho — additional production (track 12)
- Shvona Chung — additional finger snaps and hand claps (track 13)
- Ted Chung — additional finger snaps and hand claps (track 13)
- Jimmy Coleman — live drums (track 9)
- Tom Craskey — bass (tracks 7, 9, 10)
- Karesha Crawford — trombone (track 4)
- Jay Curtis — guitar (track 5)
- Andrew Dawson — engineer (tracks 7, 11, 14)
- Jenee Dixon — trumpet (track 4)
- Pete Donelly — engineer (track 9)
- Jeremy Dyen — ARP synthesizer (track 9)
- Mike Eleopoulos — assistant engineer (tracks 1–4, 6, 8, 13)
- Aaron Fessel — engineer (track 7)
- Michael Harmon — engineer (track 9)
- DeVon "Devo" Harris — producer (tracks 11, 12, 14)
- Sharief Hobley — guitar (track 11)
- Corey Hogan — saxophone (track 4)
- The Horn Dogs — horns (track 3)
- Matt Hueneman — engineer (track 13)
- Jun Ishizeki — engineer (tracks 9, 10)
- Tim Izo — saxophone (tracks 3, 5), flute (3)
- Glenn Jeffery — guitar (track 6)
- Anthony Kilhoffer — engineer (tracks 1–4, 6, 8, 11–14)
- Elizabeth Lea — trombone (track 5)
- John Legend — vocals (all tracks), piano (1–8, 11, 13), organ (4, 5, 11), keyboards (9, 12, 14), Rhodes (11), producer (1, 8, 13), co-producer (2–4, 6, 7, 14), co-executive producer
- Andy Manganello — engineer (tracks 2–4, 6, 8, 13)
- Manny Marroquin — mixing (tracks 1–9, 11–14)
- Tara Michel — additional vocals (tracks 2, 4, 6)
- Na2 — additional vocals (track 7)
- George Pajon Jr. — guitar (tracks 3, 5)
- Michael Peters — engineer (tracks 2–4, 6, 8, 11), assistant engineer (7, 14)
- Lenesha Randolph — additional vocals (track 7)
- Jared Robbins — assistant mix engineer (tracks 1–6, 8)
- James Roston — additional vocals (track 7)
- M'balia Singley — background vocals (track 9)
- Snoop Dogg — rap vocals and spoken ad-libs (track 7)
- Andy Kravitz — engineer (track 9)
- A. Wayne Stephens — additional lead and backup vocals (track 13)
- Brandy Stephens — additional backup vocals (track 13)
- Brett Stephens — additional backup vocals (track 13)
- Dionne Stephens — additional backup vocals (track 13)
- Doris Stephens — additional backup vocals (track 13)
- H. Anthony Stephens — additional lead and backup vocals (track 13)
- Kashaan Stephens — additional lead and backup vocals (track 13)
- Marjorie Stephens — additional backup vocals (track 13)
- Phyllis E. Stephens — additional backup vocals (track 13)
- Phyllis Y. Stephens — additional backup vocals (track 13)
- Ronald Stephens II — additional lead and backup vocals (track 13)
- Ronald "Bumper" Stephens II — additional finger snaps and hand claps (track 13)
- Vada Stephens — additional backup vocals (track 13)
- Vaughan Stephens — additional lead and backup vocals (track 13)
- Swiss Chris — live drums (track 11)
- Steve Tirpak — trumpet (track 7)
- Tarrey Torae — additional lead and background vocals (track 14)
- Dave Tozer — producer and engineer (tracks 7, 9, 10), mixing (10), guitars (2, 7, 9, 10, 12, 14), bass (2, 11, 14), keyboard programming (7, 10), drum programming (7, 9, 10)
- Jason Villaroman — engineer (track 5)
- Kanye West — producer (tracks 2–4, 6), co-producer and drum programming (14), rap vocals (6), executive producer
- Melanie Williams — additional backup vocals (track 13)
- will.i.am — producer, clav, moog bass, and drum programming (track 5)
- Quincy S. Jackson - marketing

== Charts ==
=== Weekly charts ===
Year-end chart performance for Get Lifted
Chart (2004–2006)	Peak position
Australian Albums (ARIA)	36
Australian Urban Albums (ARIA)	10
Belgian Albums (Ultratop Flanders)	43
Danish Albums (Hitlisten)	33
Dutch Albums (Album Top 100)	5
French Albums (SNEP)	53
Irish Albums (IRMA)	42
Italian Albums (FIMI)	49
New Zealand Albums (RMNZ)	35
Norwegian Albums (VG-lista)	1
Swedish Albums (Sverigetopplistan)	2
Swiss Albums (Schweizer Hitparade)	65
Taiwanese Albums (Five Music)	18
UK Albums (Official Charts)	12
UK R&B Albums (Official Charts)	2
US Billboard 200	4
US Top R&B/Hip-Hop Albums (Billboard)	1

=== Year-end charts ===
2005 year-end chart performance for Get Lifted
Chart (2005)	Position
Dutch Albums (Album Top 100)	24
Swedish Albums (Sverigetopplistan)	67
UK Albums (OCC)	61
US Billboard 200	34
US Top R&B/Hip-Hop Albums (Billboard)	9
Worldwide Albums (IFPI)	48

2006 year-end chart performance for Get Lifted
Chart (2006)	Position
Australian Urban Albums (ARIA)	44
US Top R&B/Hip-Hop Albums (Billboard)	76

== Certifications ==
Region	Certification	Certified units/sales
Australia (ARIA)	Gold	35,000^{^}
Canada (Music Canada)	Gold	50,000^{^}
Ireland (IRMA)	Gold	7,500^{^}
Netherlands (NVPI)	Gold	40,000^{^}
United Kingdom (BPI)	Platinum	490,199
United States (RIAA)	2× Platinum	2,100,000
^{^} Shipments figures based on certification alone.
