= Used to Love U =

Single by John Legend

from the album Get Lifted
- B-side: "Money Blown"
- Released: August 31, 2004
- Recorded: 2004
- Genre: R&B; hip hop soul
- Length: 3:30
- Label: GOOD; Sony Urban; Columbia
- Songwriters: John Stephens; Kanye West
- Producers: John Legend; Kanye West

John Legend singles chronology
| "Selfish" (2004) | "Used to Love U" (2004) | "Ordinary People" (2005) |

Music video
- "Used to Love U" on YouTube

"Used to Love U" is the debut solo single by American singer John Legend. It was written and produced by Legend and rapper-producer Kanye West for his debut album Get Lifted (2004). Released as Legend's debut single as well as the album's leading single in August 2004, the song reached number 30 in New Zealand and the United Kingdom as well as number 11 in the Flemish region of Belgium. "Used to Love U" also peaked at number 32 on the US Billboard Hot R&B/Hip-Hop Songs.

== Music video ==
Directed by Ben Mor, the video for "Used to Love U" begins with John Legend taking his girlfriend to a church where a sermon is taking place. Through the girlfriend's point of view, we see that she's more interested with shiny jewelry than being with Legend. The sermon is held by Kanye West, backed by a choir, who gets Legend to play the piano. After playing the piano, Legend stands up and sings in front his girlfriend and his previous exes that are in the audience, saying that he's better off without them. Kat Graham of The Vampire Diaries fame appears towards the end of the video.

== Track listings ==
CD single

Maxi-Single
| No. | Title | Length |
|---|---|---|
| 1. | "Used to Love U" (Album Version) | 3:31 |
| 2. | "Used to Love U" (Sam Frank Club Mix) | 3:44 |
| 3. | "Used to Love U" (Yam Who? Club Mix) | 4:56 |
| 4. | "Money Blown" | 4:38 |

== Personnel ==
Credits adapted from the liner notes of Get Lifted.

- Kanye West – producer
- John Legend – co-producer, vocals, piano
- Anthony Kilhoffer – engineer
- Andy Manganello – engineer
- Michael Peters – engineer
- Mike Eleopoulos – assistant engineer
- Pablo Arraya – assistant engineer
- Val Brathwaite – assistant engineer
- Manny Marroquin – mixing
- Jared Robbins – assistant mix engineer
- The Horn Dogs – horns
- Printz Board – trumpet
- Tim Izo – saxophone, flute
- George Pajon – guitar
- Miri Ben-Ari – strings

== Charts ==
=== Weekly charts ===
Weekly chart performance for "Used to Love U"
| Chart (2004–2005) | Peak position |
|---|---|
| Australia (ARIA) | 67 |
| Australian Urban (ARIA) | 17 |
| Belgium (Ultratop 50 Flanders) | 11 |
| Ireland (IRMA) | 45 |
| Netherlands (Dutch Top 40) | 69 |
| New Zealand (Recorded Music NZ) | 27 |
| UK Singles (Official Charts) | 29 |
| US Billboard Hot 100 | 74 |
| US Hot R&B/Hip-Hop Songs (Billboard) | 32 |

=== Year-end charts ===
2005 year-end chart performance for "Used to Love U"
| Chart (2005) | Position |
|---|---|
| UK Urban (Music Week) | 32 |

== Release history ==
| Region | Date | Format(s) | Label(s) | Ref. |
|---|---|---|---|---|
| United States | September 7, 2004 | Rhythmic contemporary radio | Columbia | |
