= From the Bottom of My Heart (Stevie Wonder song) =

2005 single by Stevie Wonder

Single by Stevie Wonder

from the album A Time to Love
- Released: 2006
- Genre: Pop; R&B
- Length: 5:12 (album version); 4:36 (single version)
- Label: Motown
- Songwriter: Stevie Wonder
- Producer: Stevie Wonder

Stevie Wonder singles chronology
"Positivity" (2005)	"From the Bottom of My Heart" (2006)	"Shelter in the Rain" (2006)

"From the Bottom of My Heart" is a song by American singer, songwriter, and musician Stevie Wonder, released as the second single from his 2005 album A Time to Love. The song peaked at number 25 on the US Adult Contemporary chart and number 52 on the Hot R&B/Hip-Hop Songs chart. It won the 2006 Grammy Award for Best Male Pop Vocal Performance.

== Charts ==
Chart (2006)	Peak position
CIS Airplay (TopHit)	182
US Adult Contemporary (Billboard)	25
US Hot R&B/Hip-Hop Songs (Billboard)	52
