= Francis Awe =

American drummer

Omoba Francis Awe
- Born: Maiduguri, Nigeria
- Occupation: Musician
- Instrument: Talking drum
- Labels: Bindu
- Website: www.nitade.com

Francis Awe is a prince of the Yoruba tribe of Nigeria. He is said to be a master of the Nigerian talking drum.

== Life ==
His grandmother was the one who discovered his talent when he was only two months old. Every time there would be drums being played he would cry. So one day his grandmother decided to take him to a place where there were drums being played. Francis would stop crying as soon as he heard the drums. The grandmother did this on three occasions and finally she introduced him to the village drummers and they took him under their wing. In 1981 Francis earned a degree in Dramatic Arts at The University of Ife in Osun State, Nigeria. After graduating he got a job as a drummer and Chief Cultural Assistant at The University of Lagos, Centre for Cultural Studies. Soon after, he decided he wanted to come to America and go to school at The California Institute of the Arts. There he received a bachelor's degree in World Arts and Cultures.

In 1985 Francis Awe formed The Nigerian Talking Drum Ensemble with his wife, Omowale, who is the lead dancer. The Nigerian Talking Drum Ensemble is a group that performs with the hopes to educate the people about the Nigerian culture through music and dance. The group has traveled to places throughout the United States and also to Mexico, Italy, Germany, and India. With the Ensemble, Francis goes to universities and schools, and also teaches at workshops. He has composed for movies, television, and on stage. He is currently a recording artist for Bindu Records and is releasing an album with his drumming titled, Oro Ijinle. Awe has said that his mission is to, "Not only make the Dundun a universal instrument, but also to transmit the family aspect of African life to all the people of the universe." He also had two children. His oldest, Asabi Awe and his youngest Babatunde Awe (www.bindurecords.com)
