= Ordinary People (John Legend song) =

Single by John Legend

from the album Get Lifted
- Released: April 7, 2005
- Recorded: 2004
- Genre: Soul
- Length: 4:41 (album version); 4:01 (single version)
- Label: GOOD; Sony Urban; Columbia
- Songwriters: John Stephens; Will Adams
- Producers: John Legend; will.i.am

John Legend singles chronology
"Used to Love U" (2004)	"Ordinary People" (2005)	"Number One" (2005)

Music video
- "Ordinary People" on YouTube

"Ordinary People" is a song by American singer John Legend, released by GOOD Music and Columbia Records on April 7, 2005 as the second single from his debut studio album, Get Lifted (2004). Written and produced by Legend and fellow singer will.i.am, the song is a ballad discussing an emotionally tumultuous relationship.

"Ordinary People" was widely acclaimed by music critics, who praised its raw emotion and simplicity. At the 48th Annual Grammy Awards, "Ordinary People" received nominations for Song of the Year, Best R&B Song and Best Male R&B Vocal Performance, ultimately winning the latter. The song also peaked at number 24 on the Billboard Hot 100, received double platinum certification by the Recording Industry Association of America (RIAA), and appears on Now 19.

== Music video ==
The music video for "Ordinary People", directed by Chris Milk and John Legend's then-label boss Kanye West, features Legend playing a grand piano in an all-white space, while couples and families fight and reconcile around and in front of the piano. For the final minute of the video, Legend is joined by a string section and a harmonica (played offscreen). Legend walks to and from the piano with a glass of water, as a short bookending to the video proper.

== Composition ==
The main chord progression is derived from the introduction to Stevie Wonder's "My Cherie Amour", transposed to the key of F major. This is punctuated in the music video version, when the string section and harmonica are brought in at the last chorus of the song.

The song's lyrical themes include contrast, contradiction, guilt, doubt and fear.

Legend sings about how people make errors of judgment in relationships ("I know I misbehaved/And you've made your mistakes/And we both still got room left to grow."), and that fighting and making up in the end is a regular obstacle: "And though love sometimes hurts/I still put you first/And we'll make this thing work/But I think we should take it slow." The lyrics include parallel structure to address the common ups-and-downs of maintaining a relationship: "Maybe we'll live and learn/Maybe we'll crash and burn/Maybe you'll stay/Maybe you'll leave/Maybe you'll return/Maybe another fight/Maybe we won't survive/Maybe we'll grow, we never know." The song's title itself is taken from its chorus, "We're just ordinary people/We don't know which way to go/'Cause we're ordinary people/Maybe we should take it slow."

Legend explained the song's lyrical content in the book Chicken Soup for the Soul: The Story Behind the Song: "The idea for the song is that relationships are difficult and the outcome uncertain. If a relationship is going to work, it will require compromise and, even then, it is not always going to end the way you want it to. No specific experience in my life led me to the lyrics for this song, although my parents were married twice to each other and divorced twice from each other. Their relationship is, of course, one of my reference points, but I didn't write this to be autobiographical or biographical. It is just a statement about relationships and my view on them."

== Reception ==
Critics were overwhelmingly positive towards "Ordinary People", many of whom complimented the song's juxtaposition of simple stark piano and John Legend's vocal range. Entertainment Weekly noted "Ordinary People" as being both "the simplest" and "perhaps the most perfectly realized song" of the Get Lifted album, describing it as "an exquisite ballad" that is "both immediately familiar and intensely exotic." A review from The Guardian called the song "a real gem", and lauded further: "[I]t's not only sonically arresting but lyrically reflective. Refusing to tie up loose ends, Legend is ambivalent about the relationship described in the song, admitting that there's 'no fairy-tale conclusion'. Good for him." PopMatters was favorable towards the single, stating it "is representative of true talent." Jonathan Forgang, reviewing for Stylus Magazine, stated: "'Ordinary People', the first of the piano and voice ballads, is a bit more derivative than the earlier tracks but expertly performed. Legend's voice has a naked quality to it, warm and full without any of the drawbacks of virtuosity." The Times thought the song was full of "remorseful reflection" and said that "the album as a whole is a stunning advertisement for the less-is-more, from-the-soul approach, and Legend’s extraordinary voice (alternately angelic keen and cracked rasp) and piano-playing are equalled in quality by the depth of his songs."

On 14 April 2012, the song was performed on series 1 of BBC's The Voice UK by semi-finalist Jaz Ellington as a second song (requested by Jessie J), resulting in some members of the UK public buying the track on iTunes. The song re-entered the Official UK Top 40 at number 27 on 15 April, and the following week climbed to number 4.

== Personnel ==
- Vocals, piano and produced by John Legend
- Engineered by Anthony Kilhoffer, Andy Manganello and Michael Peters
- Assistant engineers: Mike Eleopoulos, Pablo Arraya and Val Brathwaite
- Mixed by Manny Marroquin at Larrabee Studios, LA
- Assistant mix engineer: Jared Robbins

Recorded at Record Plant, LA and Sony Music Studios

== Track listing ==
CD single

1. "Ordinary People" (Album Version) - 4:40
2. "Ordinary People" (Johnny Douglas Radio Edit) - 3:34
3. "Ordinary People" (Live at The Scala) - 7:12
4. "Ordinary People" (Heavy Metal Remix) - 4:50
5. "Ordinary People" (Video) - 4:55

12" vinyl

A

1. "Ordinary People" (Johnny Douglas Remix) - 5:01
2. "Ordinary People" (Johnny Douglas Remix Instrumental) - 4:13

B

1. "Ordinary People" (Heavy Metal Remix) - 4:50
2. "Ordinary People" (Heavy Remix Instrumental) - 4:50
3. "Ordinary People" (Album Version) - 4:40

== Charts ==
=== Weekly charts ===
Chart (2005)	Peak position
Australia (ARIA)	88
Australian Urban (ARIA)	31
Netherlands (Dutch Top 40)	20
Netherlands (Single Top 100)	40
UK Singles (Official Charts)	27
UK Hip Hop/R&B (Official Charts)	7
US Billboard Hot 100	24
US Hot R&B/Hip-Hop Songs (Billboard)	4
Chart (2012)	Peak position
Ireland (IRMA)	19
Scottish Singles Sales (Official Charts)	6
UK Hip Hop/R&B (Official Charts)	1
UK Singles (Official Charts)	4

=== Year-end charts ===
Chart (2005)	Position
US Billboard Hot 100	87
US Hot R&B/Hip-Hop Songs (Billboard)	12
Chart (2012)	Position
UK Singles (Official Charts Company)	138

== Certifications ==
Region	Certification	Certified units/sales
Australia (ARIA)	Platinum	70,000^{‡}
Denmark (IFPI Danmark)	Gold	45,000^{‡}
New Zealand (RMNZ)	Platinum	30,000^{‡}
United Kingdom (BPI)	Platinum	600,000^{‡}
United States (RIAA)	2× Platinum	2,000,000^{‡}
^{‡} Sales+streaming figures based on certification alone.

== Release history ==
Region	Date	Format(s)	Label(s)	Ref.
United States	November 29, 2004	Urban contemporary radio	Columbia	
United States	March 8, 2005	Contemporary hit radio	Columbia	
