= So What the Fuss =

2005 single by Stevie Wonder

Single by Stevie Wonder featuring En Vogue & Prince

from the album A Time to Love
- Released: 2005
- Genre: Funk
- Length: 5:04 (album version); 4:11 (single version)
- Label: Motown
- Songwriter: Stevland Morris
- Producer: Stevie Wonder

Stevie Wonder singles chronology
"What a Wonderful World" (2003)	"So What the Fuss" (2005)	"Positivity" (2005)

"So What the Fuss" is a song from Stevie Wonder's 2005 album A Time to Love. The song features En Vogue and Prince. As of 2026, it is Wonder's final Billboard Hot 100 single.

== Charts ==
=== Weekly charts ===
Weekly chart performance for "So What the Fuss"
Chart (2005)	Peak position
Canada (Nielsen SoundScan)	6
Denmark (Tracklisten)	16
Hungary (Rádiós Top 40)	14
Ireland (IRMA)	37
Italy (FIMI)	27
Netherlands (Dutch Top 40 Tipparade)	7
Netherlands (Single Top 100)	82
Norway (VG-lista)	17
Scotland Singles (Official Charts)	23
Switzerland (Schweizer Hitparade)	46
UK Singles (Official Charts)	19
UK Hip Hop/R&B (Official Charts)	6
US Billboard Hot 100	96
US Adult Contemporary (Billboard)	40
US Hot R&B/Hip-Hop Songs (Billboard)	34

=== Year-end charts ===
Year-end chart performance for "So What the Fuss"
Chart (2005)	Position
UK Urban (Music Week)	40
