= So High (John Legend song) =

Single by John Legend

from the album Get Lifted
- Released: December 8, 2005
- Recorded: 2004
- Genre: R&B; neo soul
- Length: 5:14
- Label: GOOD; Sony Urban; Columbia
- Songwriters: John Stephens; DeVon "Devo" Harris; Paul Cho; Leon Ware; Pam Sawyer
- Producer: Harris

John Legend singles chronology
"Number One" (2005)	"So High" (2005)	"Grammy Family" (2006)

"So High" is a song by American singer John Legend, co-written with Paul Cho and DeVon "Devo" Harris, and released as the fourth single from his debut album Get Lifted (2004). Produced by Harris, It samples "I Don't Need No Reason" by Jr. Walker & The All Stars, earning additional songwriting credits for Leon Ware and Pam Sawyer. The song peaked at number 53 on the US Billboard Hot R&B/Hip-Hop Songs, but gained further recognition through a remix featuring Lauryn Hill, which was nominated for Best R&B Performance by a Duo or Group with Vocals at the 48th Annual Grammy Awards.

== Track listings ==
CD Single
No.	Title	Length
1.	"So High" (Album Version)	5:14
2.	"So High (Cloud 9 Remix Edit)" (featuring Lauryn Hill)	3:49
3.	"So High" (Live @ the Scala)	4:56
4.	"So High" (Video)	4:38

UK CD single
No.	Title	Length
1.	"So High (Cloud 9 Remix)" (featuring Lauryn Hill)	5:06
2.	"So High (Cloud 9 Remix Edit)" (featuring Lauryn Hill)	3:49
3.	"So High" (Album Version)	5:14

== Charts ==
Chart (2005)	Peak position
US Bubbling Under Hot 100 (Billboard)	5
US Hot R&B/Hip-Hop Songs (Billboard)	53
