= John Legend =

American singer and songwriter (born 1978)

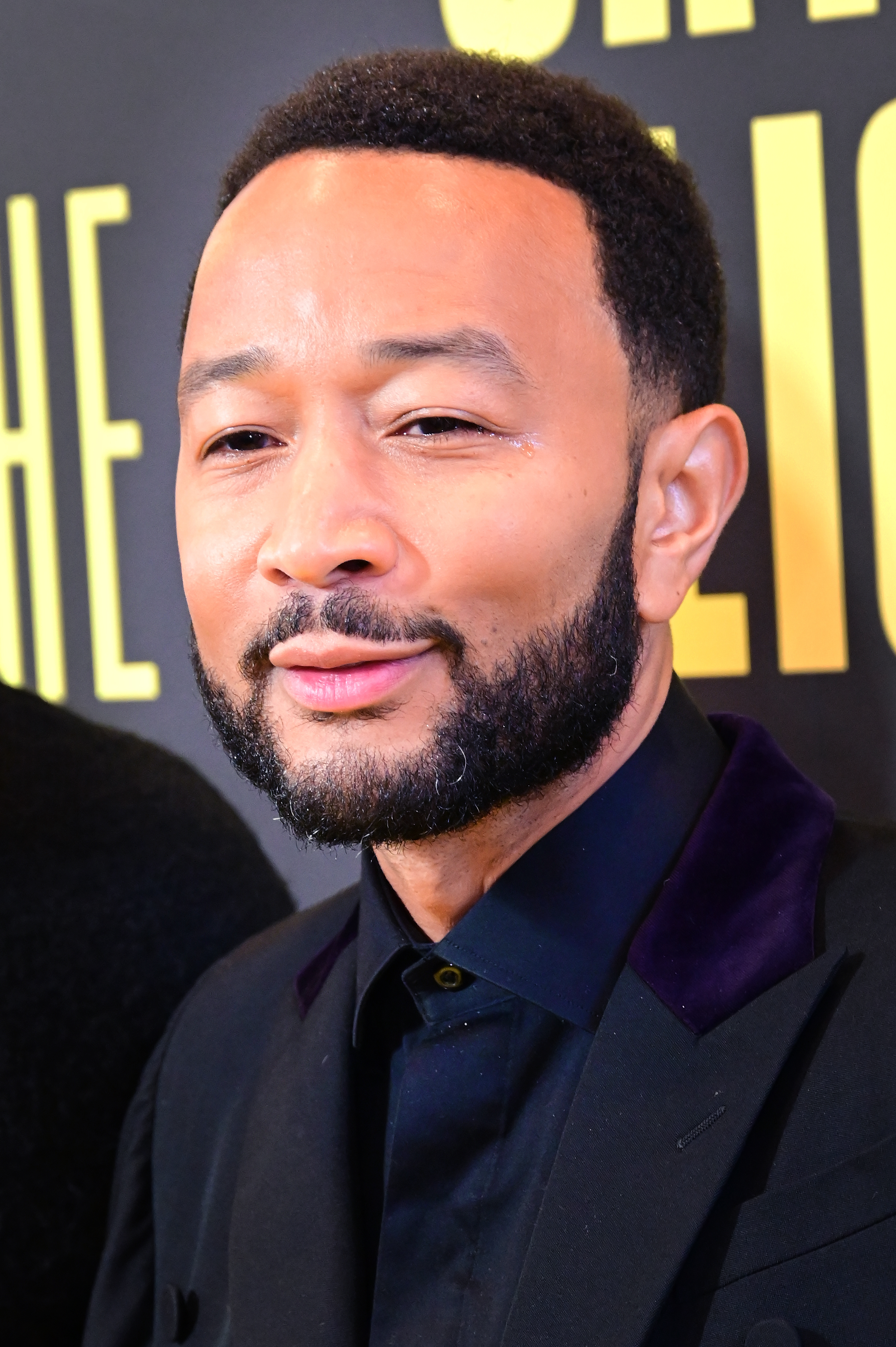
- Legend in 2026
- Born: John Roger Stephens; December 28, 1978 (age 47); Springfield, Ohio, U.S.
- Education: University of Pennsylvania (BA)
- Occupations: Singer; songwriter; pianist; record producer; actor
- Years active: 1998–present
- Works: Discography; filmography; production
- Political party: Democratic
- Spouse: Chrissy Teigen (m. 2013)
- Children: 4
- Awards: Full list
- Musical career
- Genres: R&B; pop; hip-hop soul; neo soul
- Instruments: Vocals; piano
- Labels: Republic; Columbia; GOOD; Sony Urban
- Website: johnlegend.com

John Roger Stephens (born December 28, 1978), known professionally as John Legend, is an American singer, songwriter, pianist and record producer. He began his musical career working behind the scenes for other artists, playing piano on Lauryn Hill's "Everything Is Everything", and performing as an uncredited backing vocalist on Jay-Z's "Encore" and Alicia Keys' "You Don't Know My Name". He was the first artist to sign with rapper Kanye West's GOOD Music, through which he released his debut studio album, Get Lifted (2004). Preceded by the hit ballad "Ordinary People", the album reached the top ten of the Billboard 200 and received double platinum certification by the Recording Industry Association of America (RIAA).

Legend won three Grammy Awards from eight nominations at the 48th Annual Grammy Awards—"Ordinary People" won Best Male R&B Vocal Performance, Get Lifted won Best R&B Album, and Legend won Best New Artist; the album's final single, "So High" (remixed with Lauryn Hill), was nominated for Best R&B Performance by a Duo or Group with Vocals. His second album, Once Again (2006), was met with continued success, supported by the lead single "Save Room". His third album, Evolver (2008), further diversified his sound with other genres; its funk-inspired lead single, "Green Light" (featuring André 3000), peaked within the top 30 of the Billboard Hot 100 and received double platinum certification by the RIAA. That same year, Legend released the live album John Legend: Live from Philadelphia (2008), followed by his collaborative album with the Philadelphia-based hip hop band Roots, Wake Up! (2010).

Legend's fourth studio album, Love in the Future (2013) was preceded by the hit single "All of Me". The pop ballad yielded his furthest commercial success; it peaked atop the Billboard Hot 100, spent 23 consecutive weeks in the chart's top ten, and received diamond (14× platinum) certification by the RIAA. In 2015, he co-performed with Meghan Trainor on her single "Like I'm Gonna Lose You", which peaked at number seven on the chart. The following year, he released his fifth album Darkness and Light (2016) and parted ways with GOOD Music. Legend has since released A Legendary Christmas (2018), Bigger Love (2020)—which won a Grammy Award for Best R&B Album—and his ninth album, Legend (2022).

Throughout his musical career, Legend has won 12 Grammy Awards. In 2007, he won the Hal David Starlight Award from the Songwriters Hall of Fame. Legend won the Academy Award for Best Original Song and Golden Globe Award for Best Original Song for his 2015 single "Glory" (with Common), which was released for the film Selma. He won the NAACP's President's Award in 2016. In Broadway acting, Legend won a Tony Award for co-producing the stage play Jitney (2017), and portrayed the titular character in NBC's adaptation of the rock opera Jesus Christ Superstar (2018). He received a Primetime Emmy Award nomination for his acting role, and won the award for his role as a producer of the show, making him the first Black male and second youngest recipient of all four of the major American entertainment awards: Emmy, Grammy, Oscar, and Tony (EGOT) in 2018. Legend also has served as a vocal coach for the reality competition series The Voice for eleven seasons since its sixteenth season in 2019. He became the show's senior coach following Blake Shelton's 2023 departure. He has served as the Chief Music Officer for the company Headspace since 2025.

== Early life and education ==
John Roger Stephens was born on December 28, 1978, in Springfield, Ohio. He is the second eldest of four children of Phyllis Elaine (née Lloyd), a seamstress, and Ronald Lamar Stephens, a factory worker at International Harvester. His father was a drummer, while "his mother sang and directed the church choir, and his grandmother was the church organist".

In 2004, Legend stated that his parents were divorced for 12 years before reuniting. Legend was homeschooled by his mother. He began playing the piano at the age of four. At the age of seven, he performed with his church choir. Because of his academic talent, he skipped two grades.

At the age of 12, Legend attended North High School in Springfield, Ohio, and graduated salutatorian. At the age of 15, Legend won a Black History Month essay competition sponsored by McDonald's, following the prompt "How do you intend to make Black history?" with an essay about how he intended to be a successful musician.

At the age of 16, he enrolled at the University of Pennsylvania in Philadelphia, where he served as president and musical director of the co-ed jazz and pop a cappella group, the Counterparts. His lead vocals on the group's recording of Joan Osborne's "One of Us", written by fellow University of Pennsylvania alum Eric Bazilian of the Hooters, received critical acclaim, landing the song on the track list of the 1998 Best of Collegiate a Cappella compilation CD. Legend was also a member of the Sphinx Senior Society, one of Penn's undergraduate senior societies, and Onyx Senior Honor Society. While at Penn, Legend was introduced to American singer Lauryn Hill by a mutual friend; Hill hired him to play piano on "Everything Is Everything", a song from her album The Miseducation of Lauryn Hill. During his senior year, Legend recorded his first demo EP with producer Dan Coleman, a fellow Penn and Counterparts alumnus in New York City. He graduated magna cum laude with a bachelor's degree in English, with an emphasis on African-American literature in 1999.

== Career ==
=== Career beginnings ===
After graduating from the University of Pennsylvania, Stephens worked as a management consultant at the Boston Consulting Group (BCG) and began producing, writing, and recording his own music. He released two albums independently: his self-titled demo (2000) and Live at Jimmy's Uptown (2001), which he sold at his shows. He subsequently began working on a demo tape and began sending his work to various record labels.

In 2001, Devo Springsteen introduced Stephens to Kanye West, a then up-and-coming hip-hop artist; Stephens was hired to co-write or perform hooks on several of West's songs. After signing to West's GOOD Music, Stephens chose his stage name from an idea that was given to him by poet J. Ivy, due to what he perceived as an "old-school sound". Ivy told Stephens: "I heard your music and it reminds me of that music from the old school. You sound like one of the legends. As a matter of fact, that's what I'm going to call you from now on! I'm going to call you John Legend." After Ivy continued to call him by the new moniker "John Legend", others quickly caught on, including West. Despite Stephens' reluctance to adopt a stage name, he ultimately announced his new artist name as John Legend.

=== 2004–2007: Debut album and Grammy Award ===
Legend released his debut studio album, Get Lifted, through GOOD Music, in a joint venture with Sony BMG's Columbia Records in December 2004. It featured production from Kanye West, Dave Tozer, and will.i.am, and debuted at number seven on the US Billboard 200, selling 116,000 copies in its first week. It went on to sell 540,300 copies in the United States and was certified gold by the Recording Industry Association of America (RIAA). An international success, Get Lifted also reached number one on the Norwegian Albums Chart and peaked within the top ten in the Netherlands and Sweden, resulting in worldwide sales of 850,000 copies. Critically acclaimed, it won the 2006 Grammy Award for Best R&B Album, and earned Legend another two nominal awards for Best New Artist and Best Male R&B Vocal Performance. Altogether, the album produced four singles, including debut single "Used to Love U", which entered the top 30 of the New Zealand and UK Singles Chart, and Grammy Award-winning "Ordinary People" which peaked at 24 on the Billboard Hot 100. Legend also co-wrote Janet Jackson's "I Want You", which was certified platinum and received a nomination for Best Female R&B Vocal Performance at the 47th Annual Grammy Awards.

Legend was featured on several records in the following years. He appeared on albums by Fort Minor, Sérgio Mendes, Jay-Z, Mary J. Blige, the Black Eyed Peas, Stephen Colbert, Rich Boy, MSTRKRFT, Chemistry, and Fergie, among others. Legend also tentatively recorded with Michael Jackson on a future album, for which he had written one song. In August 2006, Legend appeared in an episode of Sesame Street, where he performed the song "It Feels Good When You Sing a Song", a duet with Hoots the Owl. He also performed during the pregame show of Super Bowl XL in Detroit, and the halftime show at the 2006 NBA All-Star Game.

In October 2006, Legend's second album, Once Again, was released. Legend co-wrote and co-produced the bulk of the album, which saw him returning to work with West, will.i.am and Tozer, as well as other producers including Raphael Saadiq, Craig Street, Sa-Ra, Eric Hudson, Devo Springsteen, and Avenue. Released to major commercial success, it reached number three on the Billboard 200 and debuted atop the Top R&B/Hip-Hop Albums chart. It has since received platinum certification by the RIAA, and attained gold certification in Italy, the Netherlands, and the United Kingdom. At the 2007 Grammy Awards, the song "Heaven" won Best Male R&B Vocal Performance, while lead single "Save Room" received a nomination in the Best Male Pop Vocal category. That same night, Legend won Best R&B Performance by a Duo or Group with Vocals for his cover of "Family Affair", a collaboration with Sly & the Family Stone, Joss Stone and Van Hunt, from the former's remix album, Different Strokes by Different Folks (2005).

=== 2008–2010: Evolver ===
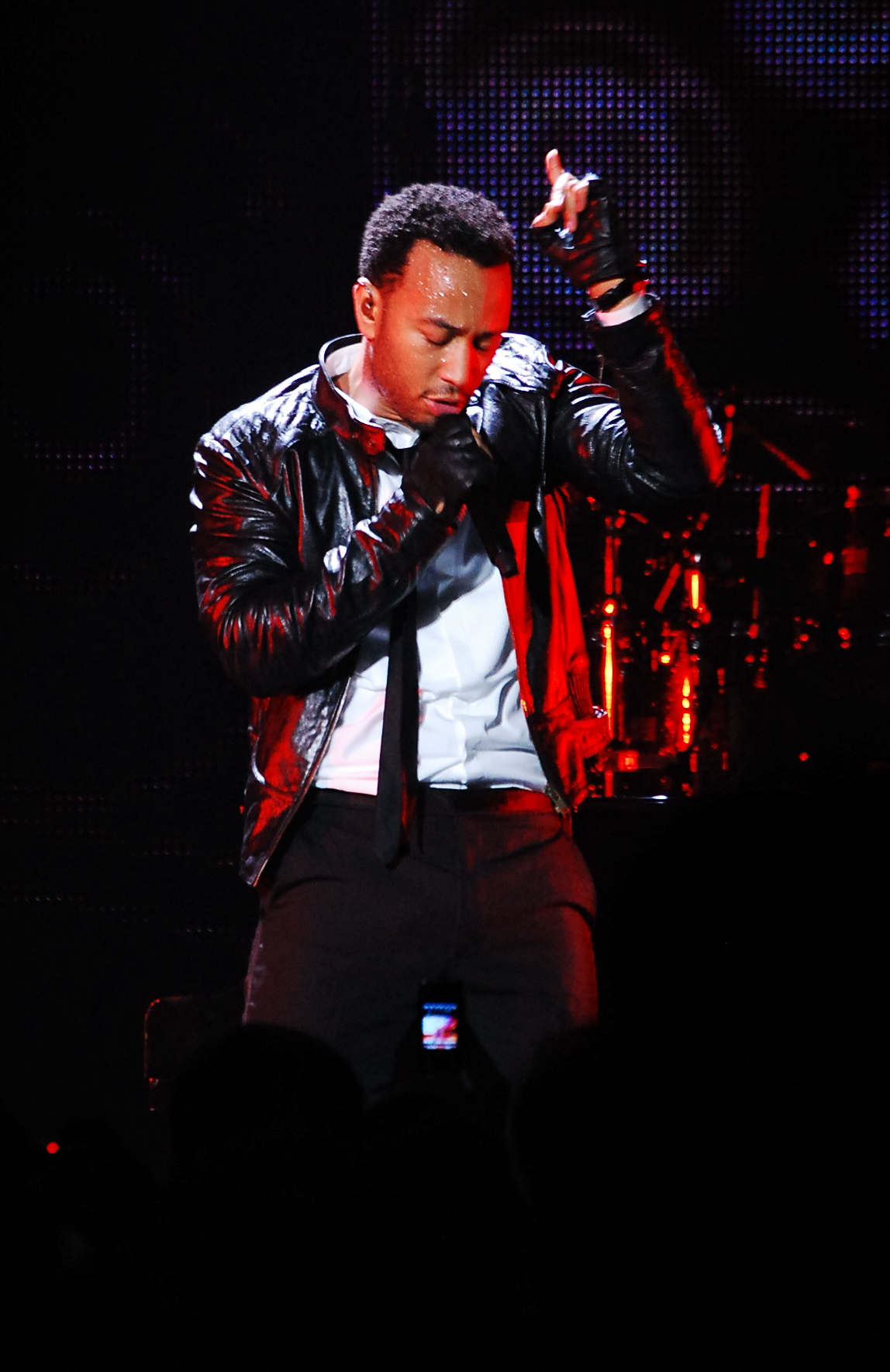
Legend performing at the Tower Theater in Upper Darby Township, Pennsylvania in 2009

In January 2008, Legend sang in a video for Barack Obama, produced by will.i.am called "Yes We Can". The same year, Legend had a supporting, singing-only role in the 2008 movie Soul Men, where he plays the deceased lead singer of a fictitious soul group that includes Samuel L. Jackson and Bernie Mac. In October, he released his third studio album, Evolver. Speaking about the reasons for calling the album Evolver, he stated: "I think people sometimes come to expect certain things from certain artists. They expect you to kind of stay in the same place you were at when you started out. Whereas I feel I want my career to be defined by the fact that I'm NOT gonna stay in the same place, and that I'm always gonna try new things and experiment. So, as I think this album represents a manifestation of that, I came up with the title 'Evolver'." The album was preceded by dance-pop-influenced up tempo single "Green Light" which featured rapper Andre 3000 of OutKast and became his highest-charting single since "Ordinary People"; it was also nominated for the Grammy Award for Best Rap/Sung Collaboration. On March 30, 2008, Legend performed "America the Beautiful" in front of a sold-out crowd of 74,635 in the Orlando Citrus Bowl, now known as Camping World Stadium, for WWE's WrestleMania XXIV.

In 2009, Legend performed in The People Speak, a documentary feature film that uses dramatic and musical performances of the letters, diaries, and speeches of everyday Americans, based on historian Howard Zinn's A People's History of the United States. Also in 2009, Legend and the Roots teamed up to record a collaborative album, Wake Up!, which was released on September 21, 2010. The first single released from the album was "Wake Up Everybody" featuring singer Melanie Fiona and rapper Common. In November 2010, Legend was featured on West's My Beautiful Dark Twisted Fantasy album, listed a feature on the song 'Blame Game'. In February 2011, Legend won three prizes at the 53rd Annual Grammy Music Awards. He was awarded Best R&B Song for "Shine", while he and the Roots won Grammy Awards for Best R&B Album and Best Traditional R&B Vocal Performance for "Hang On in There". In March 2011, Legend and the Roots won two NAACP Image Awards, one for Outstanding Album (Wake Up!) and one for Outstanding Duo, Group or Collaboration.

=== 2011–2015: Federal lawsuit, Love in the Future and "All of Me" ===
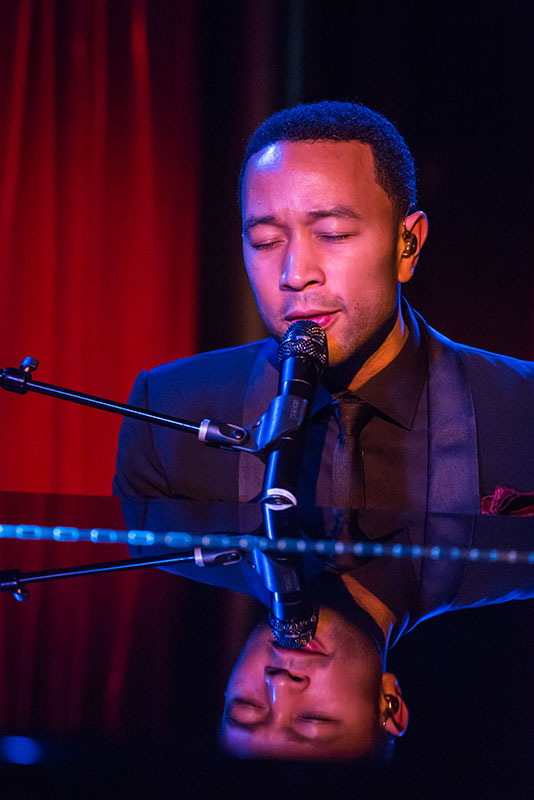
Legend at the Citi Presents: Evenings with Legends show in 2014

On July 5, 2011, songwriter Anthony Stokes filed a copyright infringement lawsuit against Legend in the United States District Court for the District of New Jersey, alleging that Legend's song "Maxine's Interlude" from his 2006 album Once Again derives from Stokes' demo "Where Are You Now". Stokes claimed he gave Legend a demo of the song in 2004 following a concert at the University of North Carolina at Chapel Hill. Legend denied the allegations, telling E! Online, "I never heard of his song until he sued me. I would never steal anyone's song. We will fight it in court and we will prevail." However, nearly 60,000 people took a TMZ.com poll that compared the two songs and 65% of voters believed that Legend's "Maxine's Interlude" is a rip-off of Stokes' "Where Are You Now". A year later, Legend confirmed that he settled out of court with Stokes for an undisclosed amount.

Also in 2011, Legend completed a 50-date tour as a guest for British soul band Sade. In the San Diego performance, Legend confirmed that he was working on his next studio album and played a new song called "Dreams". Later, via his official website, he revealed the official title of the album to be Love in the Future, and debuted part of a new track called "Caught Up". The album has been executive-produced by Legend himself, along with Kanye West and Dave Tozer – the same team who worked on Legend's previous albums Get Lifted, Once Again, and Evolver. Legend has stated that his intention for the record was "To make a modern soul album – to flip that classic feel into a modern context."

Legend was granted an honorary doctorate degree from Howard University at the 144th Commencement Exercises on Saturday, May 12, 2012. Legend was a judge on the ABC music show Duets along with Kelly Clarkson, Jennifer Nettles, and Robin Thicke. Legend's spot was originally for Lionel Richie, who had to leave the show due to a scheduling conflict. Duets debuted on Thursday, May 24, 2012.

He released his fourth studio album, Love in the Future, on September 3, 2013, debuting number 4 on the Billboard 200, selling 68,000 copies in its first week. The album was nominated for Best R&B album at the 2014 Grammy Awards. Legend's third single from the album, "All of Me", became an international chart success, peaking at number one on the Billboard Hot 100 for three consecutive weeks and reaching the top of six national charts and the top ten in numerous other countries, becoming one of the best-selling digital singles of all time. It was ranked the third best-selling song in the United States and the United Kingdom during 2014. The song is a ballad dedicated to his wife, Chrissy Teigen, and was performed at the 56th Annual Grammy Awards.

In 2014, Legend partnered with the rapper Common to write the song "Glory", featured in the film Selma, which chronicled the 1965 Selma to Montgomery marches. The song won the Golden Globe Award for Best Original Song as well as the Academy Award for Best Original Song. Legend and Common performed "Glory" at the 87th Academy Awards on February 22, 2015.

Legend was featured on Meghan Trainor's "Like I'm Gonna Lose You" from her debut studio album, which reached number eight on the Billboard Hot 100. On February 1, 2015, he sang "America the Beautiful" in the opening ceremony of Super Bowl XLIX. He provided guest vocals on Kelly Clarkson's song "Run Run Run" for her album Piece by Piece. He also co-wrote and provided vocals for French DJ David Guetta's song "Listen", as part of the album Listen.

=== 2016–2021: Resurgence ===
Legend released his new album Darkness and Light, with first single "Love Me Now", on December 2, 2016, with songs featuring Chance the Rapper and Miguel. The album marked his last album to be released under GOOD Music, following the end of his five-album contract with the label.

Legend featured on Kygo's song "Happy Birthday" for his debut studio album "Cloud Nine" released in 2016.

For the 2017 film Beauty and the Beast, Legend and Ariana Grande performed a duet on the title track, a remake of the 1991 original version sung by Celine Dion and Peabo Bryson. In April 2017, Crow: The Legend, a short animation film, premiered its prologue at the Tribeca Film Festival. Legend was cast in the title role as the character Crow. He also served as executive producer for the project and performed the original song "When You Can Fly". The film won at thirteen different film festivals including the LA Film Festival where it made its North American premiere in 2018. The film won Best Animation VR Experience at the 2018 Raindance Film Festival and received nomination for Best Virtual Reality Production at the 46th Annual Annie Awards.

On December 19, 2017, NBC announced that Legend had been cast in the title role in the live concert production of Jesus Christ Superstar at the Marcy Avenue Armory in Williamsburg, Brooklyn. The production was broadcast live on NBC television on April 1, 2018 (the date of Easter Sunday that year in Western Christianity). It was watched by 9.4 million people. An encore on April 12, 2020, was seen by 3.17 million viewers. On May 8, 2018, Google chose Legend as one of the six new Google Assistant voices.

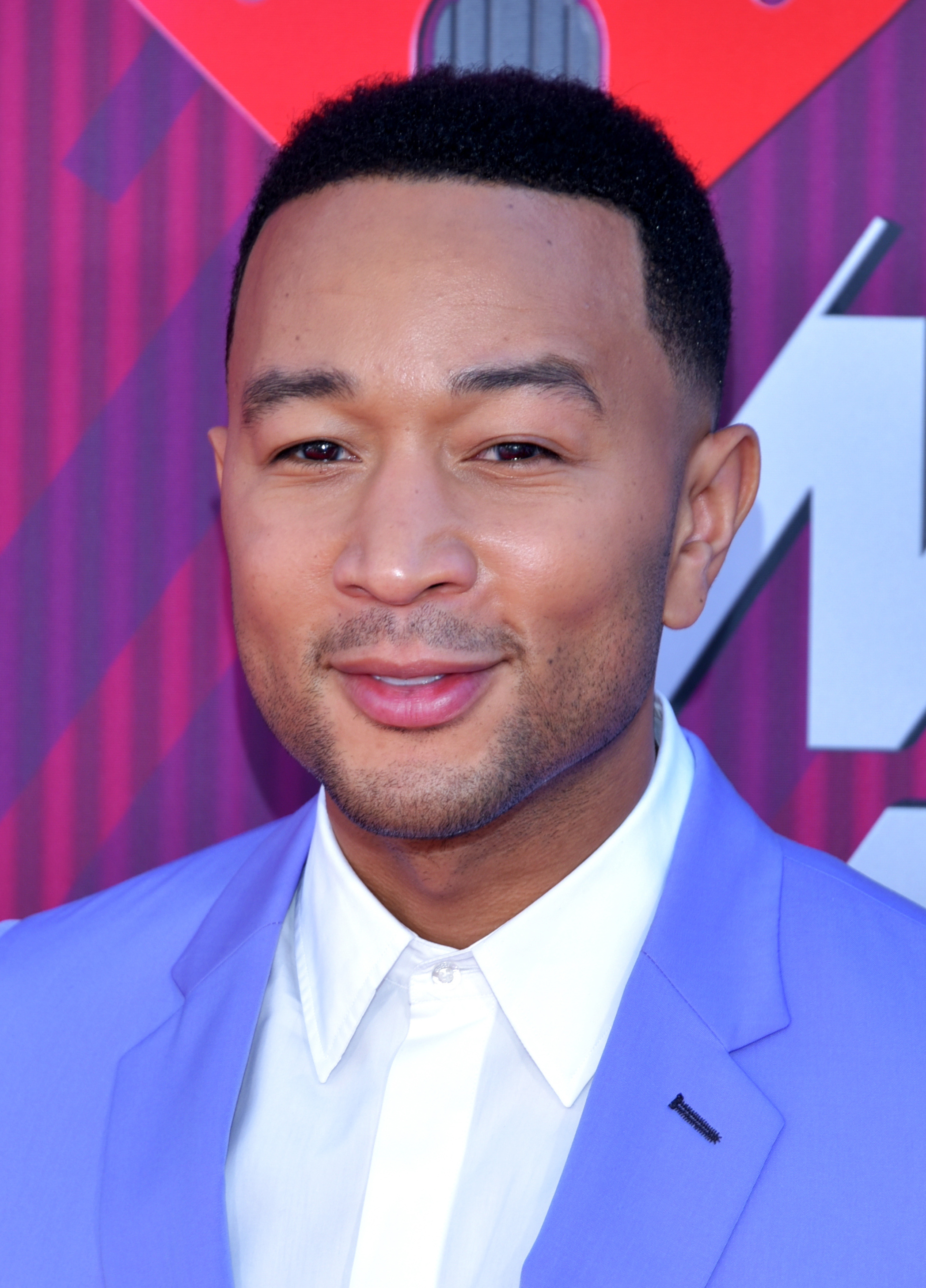
Legend at the 2019 iHeartRadio Music Awards

Legend released his first Christmas album, A Legendary Christmas, on October 26, 2018. The album was promoted by a tour of the same name from November to December 2018. It also received a nomination for Best Traditional Pop Vocal Album at the 2020 Grammy Awards. An Christmas television special with his wife entitled, A Legendary Christmas with John and Chrissy, premiered on November.

Legend was one of the few celebrities to appear and speak out in the Lifetime documentary Surviving R. Kelly. The six-part docuseries details sex abuse allegations spread over four decades against acclaimed R&B singer R. Kelly. It focuses on women who allege that the musician and record producer used his status and influence to sexually and physically abuse women and young girls for decades. Legend lambasted R. Kelly during his interview in the final episode of the series, asserting that "R. Kelly has brought so much pain to so many people. Time's up for R. Kelly."

In spite of numerous public allegations and controversies regarding Kelly, Legend stood as the only major recording artist willing to come forward and speak against him in the documentary. In response to fans who labeled him as "brave" for his actions, Legend stated the following on Twitter ahead of the program's debut: "To everyone telling me how courageous I am for appearing in the doc, it didn't feel risky at all. I believe these women and don't give a fuck about protecting a serial child rapist. Easy decision." Executive producer Dream Hampton revealed that it was "incredibly difficult" to get men and women who had artistically collaborated with Kelly to come forward, including those who had criticized him. During an interview with Detroit Free Press she said, "We asked Lady Gaga. We asked Erykah Badu. We asked Céline Dion. We asked Jay-Z. We asked Dave Chappelle. [They're] people who have been critical of him. That makes John Legend even more of a hero for me."

On May 21, 2019, Legend was the winning coach on The Voice, and won the competition with his artist Maelyn Jarmon. In November, Legend was named People's Sexiest Man Alive.

In 2020, Legend was working on a seventh album. On May 13, 2020, he announced the album would be titled Bigger Love. It was released on June 19. On May 28, 2020, Legend received an honorary doctorate from Berklee College of Music.

On June 19, 2020, Legend performed alongside Alicia Keys for episode fifteen of Verzuz. Legend is featured on Carrie Underwood's Christmas album My Gift. Legend wrote his featured track titled Hallelujah. Legend was among the performers in the Celebrating America television event held on Inauguration Day 2021. He delivered the commencement address to the Duke University Class of 2021. On November 12, 2021, Legend signed with Republic Records after completing the contract that lasted for 17 years with Sony Music. He noted that shifts in company management, such as the arrival of chairman and CEO Ron Perry at Columbia, changed the internal landscape as they adjusted to working together.

=== 2016–present: Legend, Children's album and Muse ===
Legend at the 2026 Montreux Jazz Festival

In February 2022, Legend launched the music-based NFT platform, OurSong. On April 3, 2022, performed a new song called "Free" at the 64th Annual Grammy Awards as a tribute to the fallen citizens of Ukraine amid Russo-Ukrainian War. He was joined on stage alongside by three Ukrainian female artists Siuzanna Iglidan, Mika Newtown, and poet Lyuba Yakimchuk. On September 9, 2022, he released his eighth studio album titled Legend. The following month, Legend became The Voice's senior coach in its 24th season after the departure of singer Blake Shelton. Also in 2022, Legend headlined his first Las Vegas residency called, Love in Las Vegas, held at Planet Hollywood Las Vegas.

In 2024, after finishing his 2023 tour, An Evening with John Legend, he released his first children's album and tenth studio album entitled, My Favorite Dream. The album track, "L-O-V-E", was released as the lead single. Legend collaborated with social media educator, Ms. Rachel, on a Sing-A-Longs rendition of "L-O-V-E" which received over fifty-four million views on YouTube. The album helped Legend receive his 37th Grammy nomination for Best Children's Music Album at the 2025 Grammy Awards.

In 2025, he celebrated the 20th Anniversary of his debut album with the Get Lifted 20th Anniversary Tour. A 20th Anniversary edition of the album was released with previously unreleased songs including the track, "Just in Time".

Legend released the original holiday song "Here It Is" as the official anthem for Sephora Europe's 2026 Holiday Campaign. The song's accompanying campaign film features professional dancers alongside Sephora Beauty Advisors.

Muse, Legend's eleventh studio album, was released on October 23, 2026, through Republic Records. The project was produced and co-written entirely by Pharrell Williams and was recorded primarily at Pharrell's studio inside the Louis Vuitton headquarters in Paris. The concept for the album included being structured around a fictional love saga and cinematic narrative rather than a traditional personal autobiography.

Williams and rap duo Clipse contributed to the album as features. The lead single "Daylight" and the track "Fireflies" were released with music videos to help promote the album.

On November 4, 2026, Legend released the festive jazz-pop single titled, "Get Ready", for Milan Records. The song is the lead single from the official soundtrack for the Apple TV holiday special Snoopy Presents: 12 Days of Snoopy. The Apple TV special and its full companion soundtrack—which also features contributions from Kamasi Washington, Leon Bridges, and Laufey—premieres on November 13, 2026.

== Philanthropy ==
Legend performed a benefit concert in Springfield, Ohio, in 2005 in support of a tax levy for the Springfield City School District.

In May 2007, Legend partnered with Tide laundry detergent to raise awareness about the need of families in St. Bernard Parish (Chalmette, Louisiana), one of the areas most devastated by Hurricane Katrina; he spent a day folding laundry at the Tide "clean start" mobile laundromat and visited homes that Tide was helping to rebuild in that community. On July 7, 2007, Legend participated in the Live Earth concert in London, performing "Ordinary People". After reading Professor Jeffrey Sachs' book The End of Poverty, Legend started his Show Me Campaign in 2007. In this campaign, Legend called on his fans to help him in his initiative for residents in Bosaso Village, Somalia and non-profit organizations partnered with the campaign.

In early 2008, he began touring with Alexus Ruffin and Professor Jeff Sachs of Columbia University's Earth Institute to promote sustainable development as an achievable goal. Legend joined Sachs as a keynote speaker and performer at the inaugural Millennium Campus Conference. Legend then joined the Board of Advisors of the Millennium Campus Network (MCN), and has aided MCN programs through online support and funding fellowships for MCN summer interns through the Show Me Campaign. In 2009, Legend gave AIDS Service Center NYC permission to remix his song "If You're Out There" to create a music video promoting HIV/AIDS awareness and testing.

On January 22, 2010, he performed "Sometimes I Feel Like a Motherless Child" on the Hope for Haiti Now telethon show. On September 8, 2010, John Legend joined the national board of Teach For America. Legend also sits on the boards of the Education Equality Project, the Harlem Village Academies, and Stand for Children. He serves on the Harlem Village Academies' National Leadership Board. On September 9, 2010, he performed "Coming Home" on the Colbert Report as a tribute song for the end of combat operations in Iraq, and for the active troops and the veterans of the United States Armed Forces. In 2011, he contributed the track "Love I've Never Known" to the Red Hot Organization's most recent album Red Hot+Rio 2. The album is a follow-up to the 1996 Red Hot+Rio. Proceeds from the album sales were donated to raise awareness and money to fight AIDS/HIV and related health and social issues. On March 6, 2012, John Legend was appointed by the World Economic Forum to the Forum of Young Global Leaders. Later that year, Legend stopped by Children's Hospital Los Angeles for a surprise visit and acoustic performance as a part of Get Well Soon Tour. On June 1, 2013, Legend performed at Gucci's global concert event in London whose campaign, "Chime for Change", aims to raise awareness of women's issues in education, health and justice. At a press conference before his performance, Legend identified himself as a feminist saying, "All men should be feminists. If men care about women's rights the world will be a better place."

In 2014, Legend founded the FREEAMERICA campaign, which aims to help reform incarceration in the United States. He also supported the 2018 ballot initiative to pass Florida Amendment 4, which restored the voting rights of Floridians with felony convictions.

In 2016, Legend co-signed a letter to the United Nations Secretary-General Ban Ki-moon calling for a more humane drug policy, along with people such as Richard Branson, Jane Fonda, and George Shultz. The following year, Legend appeared on Salem State University's speaker series and was recognized by Voices Against Injustice (formerly known as the Salem Award Foundation for Human Rights and Social Justice) as the inaugural Salem Advocate for Social Justice. Also in 2017 Legend donated $500,000 to Springfield City School District to renovate an auditorium, which is named in his honor, within the Springfield Center of Innovation. He performed at the John Legend Theater on October 9, 2016. In 2018, he starred in an animated virtual-reality short film written and directed by Eric Darnell, titled Crow: The Legend, together with Oprah Winfrey, telling a Native American origin tale. He also sits on the advisory board & is a financial supporter of FUSE Corps, mitigating racial inequality and breaking down barriers which contribute to racism.

== Personal life ==
Legend met model Chrissy Teigen in 2006 while filming the music video for his song "Stereo". They became engaged in December 2011 and were married on September 14, 2013, in Como, Italy. His 2013 song "All of Me" is dedicated to her. The couple have four children: a daughter born in April 2016, a son born in May 2018, a daughter born in January 2023, and a son born in June 2023. Their first three children were all conceived via in vitro fertilization. The couple had their fourth child via surrogacy.

In 2020, the couple were expecting a third child, but Teigen lost the baby at twenty weeks due to a pregnancy complication. The pregnancy loss was described by media as a late miscarriage; in 2022, Teigen clarified that the loss was "an abortion to save my life for a baby that had absolutely no chance".

On the PBS series Finding Your Roots, it was determined that Legend's genetic makeup is 64% African, 32% European, and 4% Native American.

Legend endorsed Kamala Harris in the 2024 United States presidential election.

On October 26, 2026, Legend appeared at a Fighting for Ohio rally in Dayton, OH in support of U.S. Senator Sherrod Brown and Democratic gubernatorial candidate Dr. Amy Acton. Legend denounced Republican opponent Vivek Ramaswamy for his controversial campaign ads.

== Discography ==
- Get Lifted (2004)
- Once Again (2006)
- Evolver (2008)
- Wake Up! (with the Roots) (2010)
- Love in the Future (2013)
- Darkness and Light (2016)
- A Legendary Christmas (2018)
- Bigger Love (2020)
- Legend (2022)
- My Favorite Dream (2024)
- Muse (2026)

== Tours and residencies ==
Headlining tours

- Get Lifted Tour (2005)
- Once Again Tour (2007)
- Evolver Tour (2009)
- Love in the Future World Tour (2014)
- Darkness and Light World Tour (2017)
- A Legendary Christmas Tour (2018–19)
- Bigger Love Tour (2021)
- An Evening with John Legend (2023)
- Get Lifted 20th Anniversary Tour (2025)

Residencies

- Love in Las Vegas (held at Planet Hollywood Las Vegas) (2022)

== Filmography ==
=== Television ===
Year	Title	Role	Notes
2006, 2018	Sesame Street	Himself	
2007	Curb Your Enthusiasm	Himself	Episode: "The Bat Mitzvah"
2007	Las Vegas	Himself	Episode: "Wagers of Sin"
2008	A Colbert Christmas: The Greatest Gift of All	Forest Ranger	
2009	The People Speak	Himself	Documentary
2010	Dancing with the Stars	Himself/Performer	
2011	Royal Pains	Himself	"Listen to the Music"
2015	The Tonight Show with Jimmy Fallon	Himself/Performer	Performed with Meghan Trainor
2015	Hollywood Game Night	Himself/Contestant	1 episode
2015–2019	Lip Sync Battle	Himself	7 episodes
2016–2017	Underground	—N/a	Producer
2017	The Nightly Show	Himself	1 episode
2017	Master of None	Himself	Episode: "The Dinner Party"
2017	Carpool Karaoke: The Series	Himself	Episode: "Alicia Keys & John Legend"
2018	Jesus Christ Superstar Live in Concert	Jesus Christ	Also executive producer
2018	A Legendary Christmas with John and Chrissy	Himself	
2019–2022, 2023–2024, 2025 2026	The Voice	Himself/Coach	Season 16–22, 24–25, 27, 29
2019	Songland	Himself	Episode: "John Legend"
2019	Ask the StoryBots	The King of Music	Episode: "How do you make music?"
2019	Celebrity Family Feud	Himself	Episode: "John Legend and Chrissy Teigen vs. the cast of Vanderpump Rules"
2020	This Is Us	Himself	Episode: "Light and Shadows"
2020	The Simpsons	Himself	Voice; Episode: "The Miseducation of Lisa Simpson"
2020	Whose Vote Counts, Explained	Himself (Narrator)	Episode: "Whose Vote Counts".
2021	That's My Jam	Himself/Guest	Along with Kelly Clarkson, Ariana Grande, Blake Shelton
2024	Celebrity Family Feud	Guest	Episode: "Chrissy Teigen & John Legend vs. David Chang and Deadliest Catch vs Star Trek Universe"
2025	Reading Rainbow (2025 revival)	Narrator alongside wife Chrissy Teigen	Episode: "Tiny Troubles: Nelli's Purpose"

=== Film ===
Year	Title	Role	Notes
2008	Sesame Street: Elmo Loves You!	Himself	Direct-to-video compilation
2008	Soul Men	Marcus Hooks	
2012	The Savoy King: Chick Webb & the Music That Changed America	Duke Ellington	Voice role
2016	Southside with You	—N/a	Producer
2016	La La Land	Keith	Also co-wrote/performed "Start a Fire" for film's soundtrack
2017	Crow: The Legend	Crow	Voice role, Also executive producer
2019	Between Two Ferns: The Movie	Himself	
2020	A Crime on the Bayou	—N/a	Executive producer
2020	Jingle Jangle: A Christmas Journey	—N/a	Producer
2021	Coming 2 America	Himself	Cameo
2021	The Mitchells vs. the Machines	Jim Posey	Voice role
TBA	The Road Home †	Harry Belafonte	Filming

== See also ==
- List of celebrities who own cannabis businesses
