= Kanye West production discography =

Projects supervised by American rapper

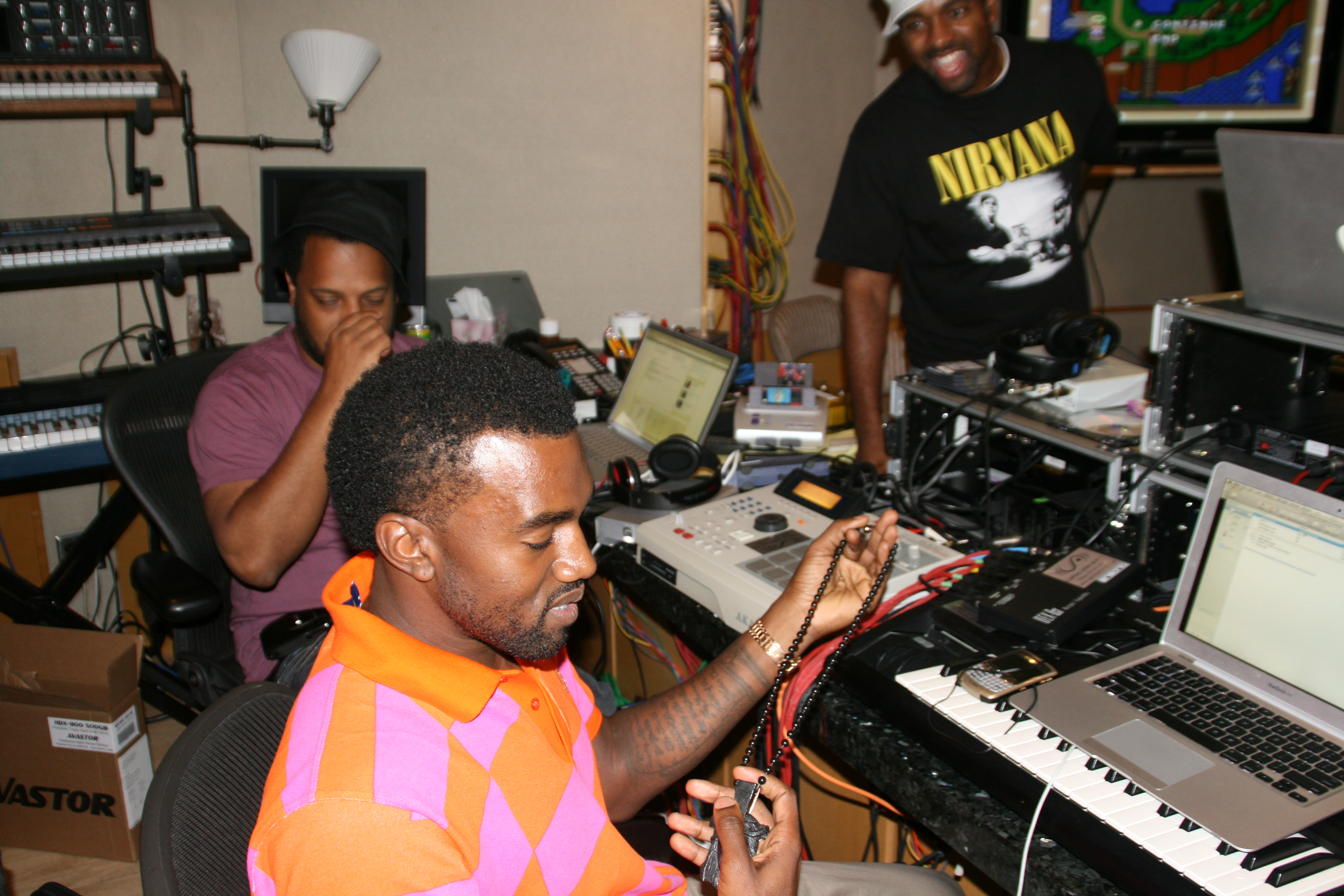
West (foreground) working in the studio with his mentor, No I.D. (left, background)

The following list is a discography of production by Kanye West, an American rapper and record producer. It includes the majority of his work, as well as a list of his production credits on songs released as singles.

== Singles ==
=== 1999 ===
- "Joanne" (Trina & Tamara)
- "Stir Crazy" (The Madd Rapper)

=== 2000 ===
- "The Truth" (Beanie Sigel)
- "It's Bigger Than Hip-Hop" (featuring Tahir and People's Army) (Dead Prez)
- "This Can't Be Life" (Jay-Z feat. Beanie Sigel and Scarface)

=== 2001 ===
- "Izzo (H.O.V.A.)" (Jay-Z)
- "Takeover" (Jay-Z)

=== 2002 ===
- "Guess Who's Back" (Scarface)
- "'03 Bonnie & Clyde" (Jay-Z featuring Beyoncé)
- "Get By" (Talib Kweli)
- "B R Right" (Trina featuring Ludacris)
- "Good To You" (Talib Kweli)
- "A Dream" (Jay-Z)

=== 2003 ===
- "Stand Up" (Ludacris featuring Shawnna)
- "Knock Knock" (Monica)
- "Through the Wire" (Kanye West)
- "You Don't Know My Name" (Alicia Keys)
- "Encore" (Jay-Z)
- "Slow Jamz" (Kanye West featuring Twista and Jamie Foxx)

=== 2004 ===
- "All Falls Down" (Kanye West)
- "I Want You" (Janet Jackson)
- "Overnight Celebrity" (Twista featuring Kanye West)
- "Talk About Our Love" (Brandy featuring Kanye West)
- "Jesus Walks" (Kanye West)
- "Selfish" (Slum Village featuring Kanye West & John Legend)
- "The New Workout Plan" (Kanye West)
- "This Way" (Dilated Peoples featuring Kanye West)
- "Used to Love U" (John Legend)
- "I Try" (Talib Kweli featuring Mary J. Blige)
- "I Changed My Mind" (Keyshia Cole)
- "Throw Your Hands in the Air" (Mobb Deep)

=== 2005 ===
- "Brand New (Rhymefest featuring Kanye West)
- "The Corner" (Common)
- "Diamonds from Sierra Leone" (Kanye West)
- "Go!" (Common featuring Kanye West)
- "Dreams" (The Game)
- "Gold Digger" (Kanye West featuring Jamie Foxx)
- "Testify" (Common)
- "Heard 'Em Say" (Kanye West featuring Adam Levine)

=== 2006 ===
- "Drive Slow" (Paul Wall featuring Kanye West and GLC)
- "Grammy Family" (DJ Khaled featuring Consequence, Kanye West, and John Legend)
- "Save Room" (John Legend)
- "Heaven" (John Legend)

=== 2007 ===
- "Wouldn't Get Far" (The Game featuring Kanye West)
- "The Game" (Common)
- "The People" (Common)
- "Can't Tell Me Nothing" (Kanye West) (produced with DJ Toomp)
- "Stronger" (Kanye West)
- "Good Life" (Kanye West featuring T-Pain)
- "Drivin' Me Wild" (Common featuring Lily Allen)
- "Flashing Lights" (Kanye West featuring Dwele)

=== 2008 ===
- "Homecoming" (Kanye West featuring Chris Martin)
- "Swagga Like Us" (T.I. and Jay-Z featuring Kanye West and Lil Wayne)
- "Love Lockdown" (Kanye West)
- "Heartless" (Kanye West)
- "Brooklyn Go Hard" (Jay-Z featuring Santigold)
- "Comfortable" (Lil Wayne)

=== 2009 ===
- "Amazing" (Kanye West featuring Young Jeezy)
- "Paranoid" (Kanye West featuring Mr Hudson)
- "Make Her Say" (Kid Cudi featuring Kanye West & Common)
- "Run This Town" (Jay-Z featuring Rihanna & Kanye West)

=== 2010 ===
- "Young Forever" (Jay-Z featuring Mr. Hudson)
- "A Star Is Born" (Jay-Z featuring J. Cole)
- "Find Your Love" (Drake)
- "Fuck the Industry" (Solange)
- "Ayyy Girl" (JYJ featuring Kanye West and Malik Yusef)
- "Power" (Kanye West)
- "Runaway" (Kanye West featuring Pusha T)
- "Monster" (Kanye West featuring Jay-Z, Rick Ross, Nicki Minaj & Bon Iver)

=== 2011 ===
- "All of the Lights" (Kanye West featuring Rihanna)
- "Party" (Beyoncé featuring André 3000 or J. Cole)
- "Otis" (Jay-Z and Kanye West featuring Otis Redding)
- "Lift Off" (Jay-Z and Kanye West featuring Beyoncé)
- "Niggas in Paris" (Jay-Z and Kanye West) (produced with Hit-Boy)
- "Gotta Have It" (Jay-Z and Kanye West) (produced with The Neptunes)

=== 2012 ===
- "New God Flow" (Kanye West, Pusha T)
- "Birthday Song" (2 Chainz featuring Kanye West) (co-produced with Sonny Digital)
- "Clique" (Kanye West, Big Sean, Jay-Z)
- "Pain" (Pusha T featuring Future)

=== 2013 ===
- "Millions" (Pusha T featuring Rick Ross)
- "Who Do We Think We Are" (John Legend featuring Rick Ross)
- "Numbers on the Boards" (Pusha T)
- "Made to Love" (John Legend) (produced with Da Internz and Dave Tozer)
- "Black Skinhead" (Kanye West)
- "Bound 2" (Kanye West)
- "Sweet Serenade" (Pusha T featuring Chris Brown) (produced with Swizz Beatz)

=== 2014 ===
- "Nosetalgia" (Pusha T featuring Kendrick Lamar)
- "40 Mill" (Tyga)
- "I Don't Fuck with You" (Big Sean featuring E-40) (co-produced with DJ Mustard, Key Wane, DJ Dahi and Amaire Johnson)
- "Lunch Money" (Pusha T)
- "Only One" (Kanye West featuring Paul McCartney)

=== 2015 ===
- "FourFiveSeconds" (Rihanna, Kanye West & Paul McCartney)
- "All Day" (Kanye West featuring Theophilus London, Allan Kingdom & Paul McCartney)
- "Bitch Better Have My Money" (Rihanna) (co-produced with Deputy, WondaGurl, Travis Scott)
- "American Oxygen" (Rihanna) (produced with Alex da Kid)
- "U Mad" (Vic Mensa featuring Kanye West)

=== 2016 ===
- "Famous" (Kanye West)
- "Father Stretch My Hands" (Kanye West)
- "Champions" (Kanye West, Gucci Mane, Big Sean, 2 Chainz, Travis Scott, Yo Gotti, Quavo & Desiigner)
- "Fade" (Kanye West)

=== 2017 ===
- "Glow" (Drake featuring Kanye West)

=== 2018 ===
- "Accelerate" (Christina Aguilera featuring Ty Dolla Sign and 2 Chainz) (produced with Honorable C.N.O.T.E., Mike Dean, Charlie Heat and Che Pope)
- "Ye vs. the People" (Kanye West featuring T.I.)
- "Lift Yourself" (Kanye West)
- "If You Know You Know" (Pusha T)
- "The Games We Play" (Pusha T)
- "What Would Meek Do?" (Pusha T featuring Kanye West)
- "Yikes" (Kanye West)
- "All Mine" (Kanye West)
- "Gonna Love Me" (Teyana Taylor)
- "Cops Shot the Kid" (Nas featuring Kanye West)
- "XTCY" (Kanye West)

=== 2019 ===
- "Issues/Hold On" (Teyana Taylor)
- "Sociopath" (Pusha T featuring Kash Doll)
- "Coming Home" (Pusha T featuring Ms. Lauryn Hill)
- "Take Me to the Light" (Francis and the Lights featuring Bon Iver and Kanye West)
- "Follow God" (Kanye West)
- "Closed on Sunday" (Kanye West)

=== 2020 ===
- "We Got Love" (Teyana Taylor featuring Ms. Lauryn Hill)
- "Made It" (Teyana Taylor)
- "Wash Us in the Blood" (Kanye West featuring Travis Scott)

=== 2021 ===
- "Industry Baby" (Lil Nas X featuring Jack Harlow)
- "A Wise Tale" (Abstract Mindstate)
- "Hurricane" (Kanye West and The Weeknd featuring Lil Baby)
- "Life of the Party" (Kanye West featuring Andre 3000)
- "Believe What I Say" (Kanye West)
- "Off the Grid" (Kanye West featuring Playboi Carti and Fivio Foreign)

=== 2022 ===
- "Eazy" (The Game and Kanye West)
- "Diet Coke" (Pusha T)
- "City of Gods" (Fivio Foreign featuring Kanye West and Alicia Keys)
- "Daylight" (Vory featuring Kanye West) (produced with 88-Keys and E*vax)

=== 2023 ===
- "Heaven To Me" (Tyler, the Creator)
- "Vultures" (¥$ featuring Bump J and Lil Durk)
- "2024" (Playboi Carti) (produced with Ojivolta and Earl on the Beat)

=== 2024 ===
- "Talking / Once Again" (¥$)
- "Carnival" (¥$ and Rich the Kid featuring Playboi Carti)
- "Like That Remix" (¥$, Future and Metro Boomin)
- "Slide" (¥$)

=== 2025 ===
- "Wheels Fall Off" (Ty Dolla Sign featuring Kanye West)
- "WW3" (Kanye West)
- "Cousins" (Kanye West)
- "Hallelujah" (Kanye West)
- "Alive" (Kanye West featuring YoungBoy Never Broke Again)
- "Come With Me" (Consequence)

=== 2026 ===
- "Gemini Season" (Kanye West)

== Albums ==
| Year | Artist | Album | Song(s) | Record label | Ref. |
|---|---|---|---|---|---|
| 1996 | Grav | Down to Earth | 03. "World Domination 1"; 05. "Sick Thoughts"; 06. "City to City" (featuring Al Tariq & Lil Ray); 07. "Thought It Was On"; 08. "Line for Line" (featuring Kanye West); 10. "Keep Movin'"; 12. "One Puff"; 13. "Down to Earth" | Correct Records | |
| 1998 | Jermaine Dupri | Life in 1472 | 01. "Turn It Out" (featuring Nas) | So So Def Recordings | |
| 1999 | Foxy Brown | Chyna Doll | 03. "My Life" {produced with Deric "D-Dot" Angelettie} | Def Jam Recordings | |
| 1999 | Infamous Syndicate | Changing the Game | 06. "What You Do to Me (featuring Kanye West)"; 08. "Clock Strikes 12" (featuring Fatal); 13. "City of Hustlas" | Relativity Records | |
| 1999 | Harlem World | The Movement | 02. "You Made Me" (featuring Nas & Carl Thomas); 03. "Minute Man" (featuring Nauty); 08. "100 Shiesty's" (featuring Drag-On) | So So Def Recordings | |
| 1999 | The Madd Rapper | Tell 'Em Why U Madd | 04. "You're All Alone" (featuring Picasso Black) {produced with Deric "D-Dot" Angelettie}; 05. "That's What's Happenin'" (featuring Tracey Lee & the Leonards, Ma$e) {produced with Deric "D-Dot" Angelettie}; 09. "Stir Crazy" (featuring Eminem); 11. "Ghetto" (featuring Raekwon, Carl Thomas) {produced with Deric "D-Dot" Angelettie}; 15. "Too Many Ho's" (featuring Jermaine Dupri, Lil' Cease) {produced with Deric "D-Dot" Angelettie}; 17. "Not the One" {produced with No I.D.} | Columbia Records; Crazy Cat Catalogue | |
| 1999 | Trina & Tamara | Trina & Tamara | 03. "Joanne" {produced with Deric "D-Dot" Angelettie} | Columbia Records | |
| 1999 | Made Men | Classic Limited Edition | 02. "Just You and I" {produced with Deric "D-Dot" Angelettie}; 15. "Is It You? (Deja Vu)" [Remix] (featuring Big Pun, Cardan, Mase) {produced with Deric "D-Dot" Angelettie} | Restless Records | |
| 1999 | Goodie Mob | World Party | 09. "Rebuilding" {produced with Deric "D-Dot" Angelettie} | LaFace Records | |
| 2000 | Dead Prez | Let's Get Free | 16. "It's Bigger Than Hip-Hop" {produced with dead prez} | Relativity Records | |
| 2000 | Beanie Sigel | The Truth | 01. "The Truth" | Roc-A-Fella Records | |
| 2000 | Jagged Edge | Let's Get Married (Maxi Single) | 01. "Let's Get Married" (Reception Remix) [featuring Kanye West] | So So Def Recordings | |
| 2000 | Da Brat | Unrestricted | 17. "Chi Town" | So So Def Recordings | |
| 2000 | Lil' Kim | The Notorious K.I.M. | 12. "Don't Mess with Me" {produced with Deric "D-Dot" Angelettie} | Atlantic Records | |
| 2000 | Jay-Z | The Dynasty: Roc La Familia | 05. "This Can't Be Life" (featuring Beanie Sigel & Scarface) | Def Jam Recordings; Roc-A-Fella Records | |
| 2001 | Beanie Sigel | The Reason | 01. "Nothing Like It"; 10. "Gangsta, Gangsta" (featuring Kurupt) | Def Jam Recordings; Roc-A-Fella Records | |
| 2001 | Jay-Z | The Blueprint | 02. "Takeover"; 03. "Izzo (H.O.V.A.)"; 08. "Heart of the City (Ain't No Love)"; 09. "Never Change"; 15. "Girls, Girls, Girls" (Part 2) {Bonus Track} | Def Jam Recordings; Roc-A-Fella Records | |
| 2001 | Jermaine Dupri | Instructions | 21. "Definition of a Pimp" {Japanese bonus track} | So So Def Recordings; Columbia Records | |
| 2001 | Abstract Mindstate the M.O.D. | We Paid Let Us In! | 07. "Pain" (featuring Trizonna) | C.R.E.A.M. Entertainment | |
| 2002 | State Property | State Property (soundtrack) | 11. "Got Nowhere" (Beanie Sigel & Freeway) | Roc-A-Fella Records | |
| 2002 | Cam'ron | Come Home with Me | 12. "Dead or Alive" (featuring Jim Jones) | Def Jam Recordings; Diplomat Records; Roc-A-Fella Records | |
| 2002 | Knoc-turn'al | L.A. Confidential presents: Knoc-turn'al | 02. "Muzik" | Elektra Records | |
| 2002 | Scarface | The Fix | 03. "In Cold Blood"; 04. "Guess Who's Back" (featuring Jay-Z & Beanie Sigel); 11. "Heaven" (featuring Kelly Price) {produced with T-Mix} | Def Jam South | |
| 2002 | Trina | Diamond Princess | 05. "B R Right" (featuring Ludacris); 16. "Do You Want Me?" (featuring Bathgate) | Slip-N-Slide Records | |
| 2002 | Nas | The Lost Tapes | 11. "Poppa Was a Playa" {produced with Deric "D-Dot" Angelettie} | Columbia Records | |
| 2002 | Various artists | Paid in Full (soundtrack) | 01. "Champions" (Dame Dash, Kanye West, Beanie Sigel, Cam'ron, Young Chris & Twista) | Def Jam Recordings; Roc-A-Fella Records | |
| 2002 | Various artists | Brown Sugar (soundtrack) | 01. "Brown Sugar (Extra Sweet)" [Mos Def & Faith Evans] {Additional production and remix by Scott Storch}; 04. "Brown Sugar (Raw)" [Black Star]; 07. "Breakdown" (Mos Def); 14. "Brown Sugar (Fine)" [Mos Def] | MCA Records | |
| 2002 | Jay-Z | The Blueprint 2: The Gift & the Curse | Disc 1: 01. "A Dream" (featuring Faith Evans & The Notorious B.I.G.); 04. "'03 Bonnie & Clyde" (featuring Beyoncé); 08. "Poppin' Tags" (featuring Twista, Killer Mike & Big Boi); Disc 2: 06. "Some People Hate" | Def Jam Recordings; Roc-A-Fella Records | |
| 2002 | Talib Kweli | Quality | 03. "Get By"; 09. "Guerrilla Monsoon Rap" (featuring Black Thought & Pharoahe Monch); 14. "Good to You" | Rawkus Records | |
| 2003 | Freeway | Philadelphia Freeway | 10. "Turn Out the Lights"; 14. "Hear the Song" (featuring Tarrey Torae) | Def Jam Recordings; Roc-A-Fella Records | |
| 2003 | Fabolous | Street Dreams | 16. "My Life" (featuring Mary J. Blige) | Elektra Records; Desert Storm Records | |
| 2003 | Hot Karl | I Like to Read | 12. "Armand Assante" | Hot Karl Music | |
| 2003 | The Diplomats | Diplomatic Immunity | 01. "Un Casa" (featuring Un Kasa & Cam'ron) {produced with Brian "All Day" Miller & E Bass} | Def Jam Recordings; Diplomat Records; Roc-A-Fella Records | |
| 2003 | Lil' Kim | La Bella Mafia | 16. "Came Back for You" | Atlantic Records | |
| 2003 | Monica | After the Storm | 06. "Knock Knock" {produced with Missy Elliott} | J Records | |
| 2003 | T.I. | Trap Muzik | 05. "Doin' My Job"; 11. "Let Me Tell You Something" | Atlantic Records; Grand Hustle Records | |
| 2003 | Britney Spears | Me Against The Music (Remixes) [US CD maxi single] | 7. "Me Against the Music" (featuring Madonna) [Kanye West Remix] | Jive Records | |
| 2003 | Boo & Gotti | Perfect Timing | 07. "Gangsta"; 15. "600" (featuring Cadillac Tah) | Universal Records; Cash Money Records | |
| 2003 | Royce da 5'9" | Build and Destroy | 04. "Heartbeat" | Groove Attack | |
| 2003 | Mystic | Cuts for Luck & Scars for Freedom... (Learning to Breathe) | "Breathe (Better Days)" | DreamWorks Records | |
| 2003 | Mystic | Cuts for Luck & Scars for Freedom... (Learning to Breathe) | "Here We Are" | DreamWorks Records | |
| 2003 | Nappy Roots | Wooden Leather | 12. "These Walls" | Atlantic Records | |
| 2003 | DMX | Grand Champ | 04. "Dogs Out" | Def Jam Recordings | |
| 2003 | Ludacris | Chicken-n-Beer | 03. "Stand Up" (featuring Shawnna) {produced with Ludacris} | Def Jam South | |
| 2003 | Jay-Z | The Black Album | 04. "Encore"; 12. "Lucifer" | Def Jam Recordings; Roc-A-Fella Records | |
| 2003 | Alicia Keys | The Diary of Alicia Keys | 05. "You Don't Know My Name" {produced with Alicia Keys}; 00. "If I Ain't Got You (Kanye West Remix)" {Australian, German, Latin American, Japanese and Korean special edition (bonus disc)} | J Records | |
| 2003 | Memphis Bleek | M.A.D.E. | 07. "I Wanna Love You" (featuring Donell Jones) | Get Low Records; Roc-A-Fella Records; Def Jam Recordings | |
| 2004 | Twista | Kamikaze | 04. "Slow Jamz" (featuring Kanye West and Jamie Foxx); 05. "Overnight Celebrity" (featuring Miri Ben-Ari); 09. "One Last Time" | Atlantic Records | |
| 2004 | Maroon 5 | This Love EP | "This Love" (Kanye West Remix) | | |
| 2004 | Whiteboy | No Grey Area | 01. "U Know" (featuring John Legend & Kanye West) | | |
| 2004 | Carl Thomas | Let's Talk About It | 17. "The Way That You Do" (featuring Kanye West) {Bonus Track} | Bad Boy Records | |
| 2004 | Janet Jackson | Damita Jo | 04. "Strawberry Bounce"; 05. "My Baby" (featuring Kanye West); 12. "I Want You" | Virgin Records | |
| 2004 | Kanye West | The College Dropout | 01. "Intro"; 02. "We Don't Care"; 03. "Graduation Day"; 04. "All Falls Down" (featuring Syleena Johnson); 05. "I'll Fly Away"; 06. "Spaceship" (featuring GLC and Consequence); 07. "Jesus Walks"; 08. "Never Let Me Down" (featuring Jay-Z and J. Ivy); 09. "Get 'Em High" (featuring Talib Kweli and Common); 10. "Workout Plan"; 11. "The New Workout Plan"; 12. "Slow Jamz" (featuring Twista and Jamie Foxx) [found too on Kamikaze]; 13. "Breathe in Breathe Out" (featuring Ludacris); 14. "School Spirit Skit 1"; 15. "School Spirit"; 16. "School Spirit Skit 2"; 17. "Lil Jimmy Skit"; 18. "Two Words" (featuring Mos Def, Freeway and The Harlem Boys Choir); 19. "Through the Wire"; 20. "Family Business"; 21. "Last Call" | Def Jam Recordings; Roc-A-Fella Records | |
| 2004 | DJ Kayslay | The Streetsweeper Vol. 2: The Pain from the Game | 10. "No Problems" (featuring Jaheim, Left Gunz, N.O.R.E. & Nature) | | |
| 2004 | Dilated Peoples | Neighborhood Watch | 13. "This Way" (featuring Kanye West) | | |
| 2004 | D12 | D12 World | 15. "D12 World" | Shady Records | |
| 2004 | Petey Pablo | Still Writing in My Diary: 2nd Entry | 13. "I Swear" | Jive Records | |
| 2004 | Jadakiss | Kiss of Death | 14. "Gettin' It In" (featuring Kanye West) | Ruff Ryders Entertainment; Interscope Records | |
| 2004 | Slum Village | Detroit Deli (A Taste of Detroit) | 05. "Selfish" (featuring Kanye West and John Legend) | | |
| 2004 | Brandy | Afrodisiac | 04. "Talk About Our Love" (featuring Kanye West); 06. "Where You Wanna Be" (featuring T.I.) | Atlantic Records | |
| 2004 | Consequence | Take 'Em To The Cleaners | 03. "So Soulful" (featuring Kanye West and Khayree); 04. "Yard 2 Yard" (featuring Rhymefest); 06. "Wack Niggaz" (featuring Kanye West, Common and Talib Kweli); 12. "Getting Out the Game" (featuring Kanye West); 14. "Take It As a Loss" (featuring Kanye West) | Columbia Records | |
| 2004 | Shyne | Godfather Buried Alive | 03. "More or Less" (featuring Foxy Brown) {produced with Brian "All Day" Miller} | | |
| 2004 | Mobb Deep | Amerikaz Nightmare | 12. "Throw Your Hands (In the Air)" | | |
| 2004 | 213 | The Hard Way | 08. "Another Summer" (featuring LaToiya Williams) | | |
| 2004 | Shawnna | Worth tha Weight | 09. "What Can I Do" (featuring Missy Elliott) {produced with Brian "All Day" Miller} | | |
| 2004 | Talib Kweli | The Beautiful Struggle | 06. "I Try" (featuring Mary J. Blige) | | |
| 2004 | Mos Def | The New Danger | 05. "The Rape Over" {beat reuse from Takeover}; 09. "Sunshine" | | |
| 2004 | Jin | The Rest Is History | 07. "I Got a Love" (featuring Kanye West) | | |
| 2004 | Mase | The College Dropout Video Anthology | 00. "It's Alright" (Welcome Back Remix) [feat. John Legend & Kanye West] | | |
| 2004 | Cam'ron | Purple Haze | 07. "Down and Out" (featuring Kanye West and Syleena Johnson) {produced with Brian "All Day" Miller}; 23. "Dipset Forever" {produced with Brian "All Day" Miller} | | |
| 2004 | John Legend | Get Lifted | 02. "Let's Get Lifted"; 03. "Used to Love U"; 04. "Alright"; 06. "Number One" (featuring Kanye West); 14. "Live It Up" (featuring Miri Ben-Ari) {co-produced with DeVon "Devo" Harris}; 21. "Do What I Gotta Do" {co-produced with Dave Tozer} [20th Anniversary Rerelease] | | |
| 2004 | Dwele | —N/a | 00. "Hold On (Remix)" [feat. Kanye West & Consequence] {released in 2009) | | |
| 2004 | Dead Prez | RBG: Revolutionary but Gangsta | 00. "For the Hood" ~~{leftover track}~~ | | |
| 2004 | Myleka | Non-album single | 00. "Candy" (featuring Sharpp & Kanye West) ~~{leftover track}~~ | | |
| 2004 | Rell | Non-album single | 00. "Real Love" (featuring Consequence & Kanye West) ~~{leftover track}~~ | | |
| 2004 | Ruben Studdard | Non-album single | 00. "What If" (Kanye Remix) ~~{leftover track}~~ | | |
| 2004 | Boost Mobile | Commercial | "Where You At?" (Kanye West, Ludacris & The Game) | | |
| 2005 | Various artists | Coach Carter (soundtrack) | 06. "Wouldn't You Like to Ride" (Kanye West, Common, JV & Malik Yusef) | | |
| 2005 | The Game | The Documentary | 03. "Dreams" | | |
| 2005 | Do or Die | D.O.D. | 06. "Higher" (featuring Kanye West); 10. "Paid the Price" (featuring Kanye West); 20. "Higher" (Remix) (featuring Kanye West & Shawnna) | | |
| 2005 | Mariah Carey | The Emancipation of Mimi | 06. "Stay the Night" | | |
| 2005 | Mistah F.A.B. | Son of a Pimp | 02. "Big Time" | | |
| 2005 | Various artists | Midnight Club 3: Dub Edition OST | "On the Run" (Bump J with Rick James) | | |
| 2005 | Bump J | Non-album single | 00. "Move Around" | | |
| 2005 | Bump J | Non-album single | 00. "Pushaman"; 000. "Pushaman" (Remix) [featuring Keyshia Cole, Rhymefest & Kanye West] | | |
| 2005 | Young Gunz | Brothers from Another | 07. "Grown Man Pt. 2" (featuring Kanye West and John Legend) | | |
| 2005 | Common | Be | 01. "Be"; 02. "The Corner" (featuring Kanye West and The Last Poets); 03. "Go!" (featuring John Mayer and Kanye West); 04. "Faithful" (featuring John Legend and Bilal); 05. "Testify"; 07. "Chi-City" (featuring Kanye West); 08. "The Food" (featuring Kanye West); 09. "Real People"; 10. "They Say" (featuring Kanye West and John Legend) | | |
| 2005 | Keyshia Cole | The Way It Is | 02. "I Changed My Mind" | | |
| 2005 | Leela James | A Change Is Gonna Come | 14. "It's Alright"; 15. "Didn't I" | | |
| 2005 | Miri Ben-Ari | The Hip-Hop Violinist | 04. "Fly Away" (featuring Fabolous, Kanye West & Musiq Soulchild); 10. "New World Symphony" (featuring Pharoahe Monch) | | |
| 2005 | Kanye West | Late Registration | 1. "Wake Up Mr West"; 2. "Heard 'Em Say" (featuring Adam Levine) {produced with Jon Brion}; 4. "Gold Digger" (featuring Jamie Foxx) {produced with Jon Brion}; 5. "Skit #1"; 6. "Drive Slow" (featuring Paul Wall and GLC); 7. "My Way Home" (featuring Common); 8. "Crack Music" (featuring The Game) {produced with Jon Brion}; 9. "Roses" {produced with Jon Brion}; 10. "Bring Me Down" (featuring Brandy) {produced with Jon Brion}; 11. "Addiction" {produced with Jon Brion}; 12. "Skit #2"; 13. "Diamonds from Sierra Leone (Remix)" [featuring Jay-Z] {produced with Devo Springsteen and Jon Brion}; 14. "We Major" (featuring Nas and Really Doe) {produced with Baby Dubb and Jon Brion}; 15. "Skit #3"; 16. "Hey Mama" {produced with Jon Brion}; 17. "Celebration" {produced with Jon Brion}; 18. "Skit #4"; 19. "Gone" (featuring Cam'ron and Consequence); 20. "Diamonds (Original)" [Hidden Track] {produced with Devo Springsteen and Jon Brion}; 21. "Late" [Hidden Track]; 22. "We Can Make It Better" (featuring Talib Kweli, Q-Tip, Common, and Rhymefest) (produced with Jon Brion) [UK Version] [found too on Hurricane Relief]; 23. "Back to Basics" (featuring Common) [Japanese Version] | | |
| 2005 | Paul Wall | The Peoples Champ | 11. "Drive Slow" (featuring Kanye West and GLC) [found too on Late Registration] | | |
| 2005 | Syleena Johnson | Chapter 3: The Flesh | 06. "Bulls-Eye (Suddenly)" [featuring Common] | | |
| 2005 | Czar Nok | That One Way | 14. "A Time to See" | | |
| 2005 | Mashonda | January Joy | 07. "Hold Me" (featuring Kanye West) | | |
| 2005 | Various Artists | Hurricane Relief: Come Together Now | 04. "We Can Make It Better" (Q-Tip, Common, Talib Kweli & Rhymefest) | | |
| 2006 | Scarface | My Homies Part 2 | 08. "The Corner (Remix) [featuring Common, Kanye West, The Last Poets & Mos Def] | Rap-A-Lot Records | |
| 2006 | T.I. | King | 00. "Drive Slow" (Remix) [featuring Kanye West, Paul Wall, & GLC] {Bonus Track} | | |
| 2006 | Smitty | The Voice of the Ghetto | 10. "Ghetto" (featuring Scarface, John Legend & Kanye West) | | |
| 2006 | Various artists | Mission: Impossible III (soundtrack) | "Mission: Impossible Theme"; "Impossible" (Twista, Keyshia Cole & Kanye West) | Varèse Sarabande | |
| 2006 | DJ Khaled | Listennn... the Album | 04. "Grammy Family" (featuring Consequence, Kanye West & John Legend} | | |
| 2006 | Rhymefest | Blue Collar | 03. "Brand New" (featuring Kanye West) | | |
| 2006 | Lupe Fiasco | Lupe Fiasco's Food & Liquor | 10. "The Cool"; 00. "Birds & the Bees" ~~{leftover track}~~ | Atlantic Records | |
| 2006 | Diddy | Press Play | 11. "Everything I Love" (featuring Nas & Cee-Lo Green) | Bad Boy Entertainment | |
| 2006 | John Legend | Once Again | 02. "Heaven" {produced with John Legend}; 12."Another Again" {produced with Ken Lewis, Street & John Legend}; 00. "Heaven" (Remix) [featuring Pusha T] | | |
| 2006 | The Game | Doctor's Advocate | 08. "Wouldn't Get Far" (featuring Kanye West) | | |
| 2006 | Jay-Z | Kingdom Come | 06. "Do U Wanna Ride" (featuring John Legend) | | |
| 2006 | Nas | Hip Hop Is Dead | 09. "Still Dreaming" (featuring Kanye West & Chrisette Michele); 12. "Let There Be Light" (featuring Tre Williams) {produced with Devo Springsteen}; 00. "You Mean the World to Me" ~~{leftover track}~~ [found too on The Lost Tapes 2] | | |
| 2006 | E-40 | My Ghetto Report Card | "Happy to Be Here" (Original Version) ~~{leftover track}~~; "Get Deleted" ~~{leftover track}~~ | Reprise Records | |
| 2006 | Mos Def | True Magic | "The Light Is Not Afraid of the Dark" ~~{leftover track}~~ | Geffen | |
| 2007 | Fall Out Boy | Non-album single | 00. "This Ain't a Scene, It's an Arms Race" (Remix) [feat. Kanye West] Want It All {Produced with Neal Avron} | | |
| 2007 | Consequence | Don't Quit Your Day Job! | 02. "Don't Forget 'Em"; 04. "The Good, The Bad, The Ugly" (featuring Kanye West); 13. "Grammy Family" (featuring Kanye West & John Legend) [found too on Listennn... The album] | GOOD Music | |
| 2007 | Edison Chen | 讓我再次介紹我自己 (Allow Me to Reintroduce Myself) | 8. "My Baby"; 9. "又一年" | Clot Media Division | |
| 2007 | Fabolous | From Nothin' to Somethin' | 16. "Supa" [iTunes bonus track] {Produced with DJ Clue?} | | |
| 2007 | Common | Finding Forever | 02. "Start the Show" (featuring Kanye West); 03. "The People" (featuring Dwele); 04. "Drivin' Me Wild" (featuring Lily Allen); 06. "Southside" (featuring Kanye West); 07. "The Game"; 08. "Black Maybe" (featuring Bilal); 10. "Break My Heart"; 12. "Forever Begins" (featuring Lonnie Lynn) | | |
| 2007 | Talib Kweli | Eardrum | 08. "In the Mood" (featuring Kanye West and Roy Ayers) | | |
| 2007 | Kanye West | Graduation | 01. "Good Morning"; 02. "Champion" {produced with Brian "All Day" Miller}; 03. "Stronger"; 04. "I Wonder"; 05. "Good Life" (featuring T-Pain) {produced with DJ Toomp}; 06. "Can't Tell Me Nothing" {produced with DJ Toomp}; 07. "Barry Bonds" (featuring Lil Wayne) {produced with Nottz}; 08. "Drunk and Hot Girls" (featuring Mos Def); 09. "Flashing Lights" (featuring Dwele) {produced with Eric Hudson}; 10. "Everything I Am"; 11. "The Glory" {co-produced with Gee Robinson and Patrick "Plain Pat" Reynolds}; 12. "Homecoming" {produced with Warryn "Baby Dubb" Campbell}; 14. "Good Night" (featuring Mos Def & Al Be Back) [UK/Japan Bonus Track]; 15. "Bittersweet Poetry" (featuring John Mayer) [Japan Bonus Track] | | |
| 2007 | Bone Thugs-n-Harmony | Strength & Loyalty | 00. "I Aint Satisfied" ~~{leftover track}~~ | | |
| 2008 | Michael Jackson | Thriller 25 | 15. "Billie Jean 2008" (Kanye West Remix) | | |
| 2008 | Lil Wayne | Tha Carter III | 05. "Comfortable" (featuring Babyface); 10. "Let the Beat Build" {produced with Deezle}; 00. "Did It Before" ~~{leftover track}~~ | | |
| 2008 | Solange | Sol-Angel and the Hadley St. Dreams (Deluxe Version) | 17. "Fuck the Industry" {"Everything I Am" instrumental} | Geffen | |
| 2008 | The Game | LAX | 14. "Angel" (featuring Common); 00. "Bang Along" ~~{leftover track}~~ | Grand Hustle | |
| 2008 | T.I. | Paper Trail | 13. "Swagga Like Us" (featuring Kanye West, Jay-Z & Lil Wayne) | | |
| 2008 | John Legend | Evolver | 03. "It's Over" (featuring Kanye West) {co-produced with Malay & KP} | | |
| 2008 | 88-Keys | The Death of Adam | 05. "Stay Up! (Viagra)" [featuring Kanye West] {co-produced with 88-Keys} | Decon Records | |
| 2008 | Kanye West | 808s & Heartbreak | 01. "Say You Will"; 02. "Welcome to Heartbreak" (featuring Kid Cudi) {produced with Bhasker & Plain Pat}; 03. "Heartless" {produced with No I.D.}; 04. "Amazing" (featuring Young Jeezy) {produced with Bhasker}; 05. "Love Lockdown" {produced with Bhasker}; 06. "Paranoid" (featuring Mr. Hudson) {produced with Bhasker & Plain Pat}; 07. "RoboCop"; 08. "Street Lights" {produced with Mr. Hudson}; 09. "Bad News"; 10. "See You In My Nightmares" (featuring Lil Wayne) {produced with No I.D.}; 11. "Coldest Winter" {produced with Bhasker & No I.D.}; 12. "Pinocchio Story" [hidden track] | | |
| 2008 | Nipsey Hussle | Bullets Aint Got No Name Vol. 2 | 21. "All for the Dough" | | |
| 2009 | Various Artists | Notorious (soundtrack) | 08. "Brooklyn Go Hard" (Jay-Z & Santigold) | | |
| 2009 | Teriyaki Boyz | Serious Japanese | 06. "Teriya-King" (featuring Kanye West & Big Sean); 12. "I Still Love H.E.R." (featuring Kanye West) | | |
| 2009 | Consequence | Non-album single | 01. "Whatever U Want" (featuring Kanye West & John Legend) {co-produced with Jeff Bhasker} | | |
| 2009 | Malik Yusef | G.O.O.D. Morning, G.O.O.D. Night | 07. "Promised Land" (featuring Kanye West and Adam Levine) {co-produced with Aion G}; 20. "Magic Man" (featuring Kanye West, Common and John Legend) | | |
| 2009 | Twista | Category F5 | 16. "Alright" (featuring Kanye West) (produced with No I.D. & Jeff Bhasker); 00. "Well It's Time" ~~{leftover track}~~; 00 "I Can Make You Say" ~~{leftover track}~~ | | |
| 2009 | Jay-Z | The Blueprint 3 | 01. "What We Talking About" (featuring Luke Steele of Empire of the Sun) {produced with No I.D.}; 02. "Thank You" {produced with No I.D.}; 04. "Run This Town" (featuring Rihanna and Kanye West) {produced with No I.D. and Jeff Bhasker}; 09. "A Star Is Born" (featuring J. Cole) {produced with No I.D.}; 11. "Already Home" (featuring Kid Cudi); 12. "Hate" (featuring Kanye West) {produced with Jeff Bhasker}; 15. "Young Forever" (featuring Mr. Hudson); 16. "Jockin' JAY-Z" {Rhapsody Bonus Track} | | |
| 2009 | Kid Cudi | Man on the Moon: The End of Day | 08. "Sky Might Fall" {produced with Kid Cudi}; 12. "Make Her Say" (featuring Kanye West & Common) | | |
| 2009 | Various artists | More than a Game (soundtrack) | 05. "History" (Jay-Z with Tony Williams) {produced with Kenoe} | | |
| 2009 | Mr Hudson | Straight No Chaser | 01. "Supernova" (featuring Kanye West) {produced with Dave McCracken} | Mercury Records | |
| 2010 | Tity Boi | Me Against the World 2 (Codeine Withdrawal) | 07. "Real As They Come" (featuring Lil Wayne and Dre) | | |
| 2010 | B.o.B | May 25 | 07. "Fuck the Money" (featuring Asher Roth) | | |
| 2010 | Drake | Thank Me Later | 05. "Show Me a Good Time" {Produced with Jeff Bhasker & No I.D.}; 13. "Find Your Love" {Produced with Jeff Bhasker & No I.D.}; 00. "You Know, You Know" {Produced With Prolyfic & No I.D.} ~~{leftover track}~~ | Republic Records; Cash Money Records; Young Money Entertainment | |
| 2010 | Rick Ross | Teflon Don | 05. "Live Fast, Die Young" (featuring Kanye West) | | |
| 2010 | GLC | Love, Life & Loyalty | 01. "The Big Knot" {Produced with GLC & Albert Sye}; 02. "Clockin' Lotsa Dollarz" {Produced with The Legendary Traxster}; 03. "Pour Another Drink" {Produced with Leray "Arlo" Jackson, Leonard Harris, GLC & John Legend}; 04. "Cold As Ice" {Produced with Albert Sye}; 06. "Flight School" {Produced with T-Pain & GLC}; 07. "So Real" {Produced with Keezo Kane}; 08. "My 1st Model" {Produced with Ferrari Mike & Christian Rich}; 10. "I Ain't Even on Yet" (Produced with Sean Breeze); 12. "Rosanne" {Produced with GLC}; 14. "I Did It" {Produced with Keezo Kane & GLC} | | |
| 2010 | JYJ | The Beginning | 02. "Ayyy Girl" (featuring Kanye West & Malik Yusef) {produced with Warren Taylor, Hamler, Phenom, Hassan Khaffaf, Jeff Bhasker, No I.D & Plain Pat} | | |
| 2010 | Kanye West | GOOD Fridays | 01. "Power (Remix)" (featuring Jay-Z & Swizz Beatz {pproduced with Swizz Beatz}; 05. "G.O.O.D. Friday" (featuring Common, Pusha T, Kid Cudi, Big Sean & Charlie Wilson); 06. "Lord, Lord, Lord" (featuring Mos Def, Swizz Beatz, Raekwon & Charlie Wilson) {produced with Mike Dean & Plain Pat}; 08. "Christian Dior Denim Flow" (featuring Kid Cudi, Pusha T, John Legend, Lloyd Banks & Ryan Leslie); 09. "Don't Stop!" (featuring Lupe Fiasco & Pharrell Williams {produced with Pharrell Williams}; 10. "Take One for the Team" (featuring Keri Hilson, Pusha T & Cyhi the Prynce); 12. "The Joy" (featuring Curtis Mayfield, Charlie Wilson, Pete Rock & Kid Cudi) {produced with Pete Rock} | | |
| 2010 | Kanye West | My Beautiful Dark Twisted Fantasy | 01. "Dark Fantasy" {produced with RZA, No I.D., Jeff Bhasker & Mike Dean}; 02. "Gorgeous" (featuring Kid Cudi & Raekwon) {produced with No I.D. & Mike Dean}; 03. "Power" {produced with S1, Mike Dean & Jeff Bhasker}; 04. "All of the Lights" (interlude); 05. "All of the Lights" (featuring Rihanna and Kid Cudi) {produced with Bhasker}; 06. "Monster" (featuring Jay-Z, Rick Ross, Nicki Minaj & Bon Iver) {produced with Mike Dean & Plain Pat}; 07. "So Appalled" (featuring Jay-Z, Pusha T, Cyhi the Prynce, RZA & Swizz Beatz) {produced with No I.D. & Mike Dean}; 09. "Runaway" (featuring Pusha T) {produced with Emile & Jeff Bhasker}; 10. "Hell of a Life" {produced with Mike Caren}; 11. "Blame Game" (featuring John Legend & Chris Rock) {produced with DJ Frank E}; 12. "Lost in the World" (featuring Justin Vernon of Bon Iver) {produced with Jeff Bhasker}; 13. "Who Will Survive in America" {produced with Jeff Bhasker}; 14. "See Me Now" (featuring Big Sean, Beyoncé and Charlie Wilson) {produced with No I.D. & Lex Luger} {Bonus Track} | | |
| 2010 | J. Cole | Friday Night Lights | 20. "Looking for Trouble" (featuring Kanye West, Pusha T, Cyhi Da Prynce & Big Sean) {Bonus Track} | | |
| 2010 | T.I. | No Mercy | 01. "Welcome to the World" (featuring Kanye West and Kid Cudi) | | |
| 2011 | Saigon | The Greatest Story Never Told | 11. "It's Alright" {featuring Marsha Ambrosius} | | |
| 2011 | Snoop Dogg | Doggumentary | 18. "Eyez Closed" (featuring Kanye West & John Legend) {Produced with Jeff Bhasker & Mike Dean} | | |
| 2011 | Pusha T | Fear of God | 11. "Touch It" (featuring Kanye West) | | |
| 2011 | Justin Bieber | Never Say Never – The Remixes | 06. "Runaway Love (Kanye West Remix)" [featuring Kanye West & Raekwon] | | |
| 2011 | Cyhi the Prynce | Royal Flush II | 18. "Woopty Doo" (featuring Big Sean) {produced with No I.D.} | | |
| 2011 | Beyoncé | 4 | 05. "Party" (featuring André 3000/J Cole) {Produced with Jeff Bhasker and Beyoncé} | | |
| 2011 | Jay-Z & Kanye West | Watch the Throne | 01. "No Church in the Wild" (featuring Frank Ocean) {Produced with 88-Keys}; 02. "Lift Off" (featuring Beyoncé) {produced with Jeff Bhasker & Mike Dean}; 03. "Niggas in Paris" {produced with Hit-Boy}; 04. "Otis" (featuring Otis Redding); 05. "Gotta Have It" (Produced with The Neptunes}; 06. "New Day" {produced with RZA & Mike Dean}; 07. "That's My Bitch" {produced with Q-Tip}; 09. "Who Gon Stop Me?" {produced with Sham "Sak Pase" Joseph}; 12. "Why I Love You" (featuring Mr Hudson) {Produced with Mike Dean}; 13. "Illest Motherfucker Alive" {Produced with Southside & Mike Dean} {Bonus Track}; 14. "H•A•M" (Produced by Lex Luger} {Bonus Track}; 16. "The Joy" (featuring Curtis Mayfield) {produced with Pete Rock} {Bonus Track}; 00. Interludes – follows "No Church in the Wild", "New Day", & "Welcome to the Jungle", and precedes "Illest Motherfucker Alive" | | |
| 2011 | Consequence | Curb Certified | 06. "On My Own" (featuring Kid Cudi) | | |
| 2012 | The World Famous Tony Williams | King or the Fool | 06. "Wake Up Girl"; 11. "Dreamin' of Your Love 2012" (featuring The Kid Daytona) | | |
| 2012 | Cassie Ventura | Non-album single | "King of Hearts (Kanye Mix)" | | |
| 2012 | 2 Chainz | Based on a T.R.U. Story | 05. "Birthday Song" (featuring Kanye West) {produced with Sonny Digital, BWheezy, Anthony Kilhoffer & Lifted} | | |
| 2012 | G.O.O.D. Music | Cruel Summer | 01. "To the World" (featuring R. Kelly) {produced with Andrew "Pop" Wansel, Hudson Mohawke, Ken Lewis, Mano, Travi$ Scott, Anthony Kilhoffer}; 02. "Clique" (featuring Jay-Z & Big Sean) {produced with Hit-Boy, Anthony Kilhoffer, Noah Goldstein}; 03. "Mercy" {produced with Lifted, Mike Dean, Mike Will, Hudson Mohawke}; 04. "New God Flow" (featuring Ghostface Killah) {produced with Boogz & Tapez, Anthony Kilhoffer}; 05. "The Morning" (featuring Raekwon) {produced with Illmind, Jeff Bhasker, Travi$ Scott}; 07. "Higher" (featuring The-Dream, Ma$e & Cocaine 80s) {produced with Hit-Boy, Mike Dean}; 09. "The One" (featuring Marsha Ambrosius) {produced with Hudson Mohawke, The Twilite Tone, Anthony Kilhoffer, Mannie Fresh, Lifted}; 12. "Don't Like.1" (featuring Chief Keef & Jadakiss) {produced with Young Chop, The Twilite Tone, Noah Goldstein} | | |
| 2012 | Various Artists | The Man With The Iron Fists (soundtrack) | 03. "White Dress" (Kanye West) {produced with RZA} | | |
| 2012 | The Game | Sunday Service | 09. "Rollin'" (featuring Kanye West, Trae tha Truth, Z-Ro, Paul Wall & Slim Thug) {produced by Cool & Dre} | | |
| 2013 | Pusha T | Wrath of Caine | 02. "Millions" (featuring Rick Ross) {co-produced with Southside} | | |
| 2013 | Travis Scott | Owl Pharaoh | 03. "Upper Echelon" (featuring T.I. and 2 Chainz) {produced with J Gramm Beats, Travis Scott, Anthony Kilhoffer and Mike Dean} | | |
| 2013 | Kanye West | Yeezus | 01. "On Sight" {Produced with Daft Punk}; 02. "Black Skinhead" {Produced with Daft Punk}; 03. "I Am a God" (featuring God) {Produced with Mike Dean & Daft Punk}; 04. "New Slaves"; 05. "Hold My Liquor" {Produced with Mike Dean}; 06. "I'm in It"; 07. "Blood on the Leaves" {Produced with TNGHT}; 08. "Guilt Trip" {Produced with Mike Dean & S1}; 09. "Send It Up" {Produced with Daft Punk}; 10. "Bound 2" | | |
| 2013 | John Legend | Love in the Future | 02. "The Beginning..." (co-produced with Hit-Boy); 03. "Open Your Eyes" (produced with DJ Camper); 04. "Made to Love" (co-produced with Da Internz); 05. "Who Do We Think We Are" (featuring Rick Ross) (co-produced with B!nk & The Twilite Tone); 07. "Hold On Longer" (co-produced with 88-Keys); 08. "Save the Night" (co-produced with the Runners); 10. "What If I Told You? (Interlude)" (produced with The Twilite Tone and Dave Tozer); 11. "Dreams" (produced with DJ Camper and John Legend); 13. "Angel (Interlude)" (featuring Stacy Barthe) (produced with DJ Camper); 15. "Asylum" (co-produced with Tozer); 16. "Caught Up" (co-produced with Hit-Boy); 18. "We Loved It" (featuring Seal) (produced with Jeff Bhasker) | | |
| 2013 | Pusha T | My Name Is My Name | 01. "King Push" {produced with Sebastian Sartor}; 02. "Numbers on the Boards" {produced with Don Cannon & 88-Keys}; 03. "Sweet Serenade" (featuring Chris Brown) {produced with Swizz Beatz}; 04. "Hold On" (featuring Rick Ross) {produced with Hudson Mohawke}; 09. "Who I Am" (featuring 2 Chainz and Big Sean) {produced with DJ Mano}; 10. "Nosetalgia" (featuring Kendrick Lamar) {produced with Nottz & The Twilite Tone}; 11. "Pain" (featuring Future) {co-produced by No I.D.} | | |
| 2014 | Rick Ross | Mastermind | 14. "Sanctified" (featuring Kanye West and Big Sean) {produced with Mike Dean and DJ Mustard} | | |
| 2014 | Tyga | The Gold Album: 18th Dynasty | 00. "40 Mill" {produced with Mike Dean, Jess Jackson and Dupri from League of Starz} | | |
| 2014 | Chief Keef | Nobody | 03. "Already" (featuring Kanye West) {Produced with OhZoneBeats}; 05. "Fishin'" (featuring Kanye West) {Produced with OhZoneBeats}; 09. "Nobody" (featuring Kanye West) {produced with 12 Hunna} | | |
| 2014 | Pusha T | Non-album single | 00. "Lunch Money" | GOOD/Def Jam | |
| 2014 | Various artists | The Hunger Games: Mockingjay, Part 1 – Original Motion Picture Soundtrack | 07. "Flicker" (Kanye West Rework) [Lorde] {produced with Mike Dean} | | |
| 2014 | Beyoncé | Beyoncé: Platinum Edition | 03. "Drunk in Love" (Remix) [featuring Kanye West and Jay-Z] {produced with Mike Dean} | | |
| 2015 | Kanye West | Non-album single | "Only One" (featuring Paul McCartney) {produced with Paul McCartney, Mike Dean and Noah Goldstein}; "All Day" (featuring Theophilus London, Allan Kingdom and Paul McCartney) {produced with Velous, Diddy, French Montana, Charlie Heat, Mike Dean, Noah Goldstein, Plain Pat, Travis Scott, Allen Ritter and Mario Winans} | | |
| 2015 | Rihanna | Non-album single | "FourFiveSeconds" (with Rihanna and Paul McCartney) {produced with Paul McCartney, Mike Dean, Dave Longstreth and Noah Goldstein}; "Bitch Better Have My Money"{produced with Deputy, Travis Scott and WondaGurl}; "American Oxygen" {produced with Alex da Kid} | | |
| 2015 | Big Sean | Dark Sky Paradise | 03. "All Your Fault" (featuring Kanye West) {produced with OGWebbie, Nashiem Myrick, Lee Stone, DJ Mano and Noah Goldstein}; 04. "I Don't Fuck With You" (featuring E-40) {produced with DJ Mustard, Mike Free, DJ Dahi and Key Wane} | | |
| 2015 | Madonna | Rebel Heart | 05. "Illuminati" {produced with Madonna, Mike Dean, Symbolyc One, Charlie Heat and Travis Scott}; 12. "Holy Water" {produced with Madonna, Mike Dean and Charlie Heat}; 14. "Wash All Over Me" {produced with Madonna, Avicii, Mike Dean and Charlie Heat}; 17. "S.E.X." {produced with Madonna, Mike Dean and Charlie Heat}; 20. "Auto-Tune Baby" {produced with Madonna, Diplo, Mike Dean and Charlie Heat} | | |
| 2015 | Wale | Non-album single | "The Summer League" (featuring Kanye West and Ty Dolla Sign) | | |
| 2015 | A$AP Rocky | At.Long.Last.A$AP | 09. "Jukebox Joints" (featuring Kanye West) {produced with Che Pope} | | |
| 2015 | Vic Mensa | Traffic | "U Mad" {produced with Stefan Ponce, Smoko Ono and Mike Dean} | | |
| 2015 | French Montana | Non-album single | "Lose It" (featuring Rick Ross and Lil Wayne) | | |
| 2015 | The Weeknd | Beauty Behind the Madness | 03. "Tell Your Friends" {produced with Che Pope, The Weeknd, Illangelo, Mike Dean, Noah Goldstein and Omar Riad} | Republic Records | |
| 2015 | Teyana Taylor | The Cassette Tape 1994 | 01. "Your Wish" {produced with Domo} | | |
| 2015 | Travis Scott | Rodeo | 08. "Piss on Your Grave" (featuring Kanye West) {produced with Charlie Heat, Noah Goldstein, Mike Dean, Darren King and Travis Scott} | Epic Records | |
| 2015 | Pusha T | King Push – Darkest Before Dawn: The Prelude | 05. "M.P.A." (featuring Kanye West, A$AP Rocky & The-Dream) {produced with Che Pope and J. Cole}; 10. "Sunshine" (featuring Jill Scott) {produced with DJ Mano and Baauer} | GOOD Music | |
| 2016 | Sia | This Is Acting | 07. "Reaper" {produced with 88-Keys, Jesse Shatkin and Jake Sinclair} | RCA Records | |
| 2016 | Kanye West | The Life of Pablo | 01. "Ultralight Beam" (Produced with Mike Dean, Chance The Rapper, Rick Rubin & Swizz Beatz); 02. "Father Stretch My Hands, Pt. 1" (Produced with Mike Dean, Rick Rubin & Metro Boomin); 03. "Pt. 2" (Produced with Menace, Rick Rubin & Plain Pat); 04. "Famous" (Produced with Havoc, Goldstein & Charlie Heat); 05. "Feedback (Produced with Goldstein & Charlie Heat); 06. "Low Lights" (Produced with DJDS); 07. "Highlight" (Produced with Mike Dean, Velous & Southside); 08. "Freestyle 4" (Produced with Hudson Mohawke, Goldstein & Mike Dean); 09. "I Love Kanye"; 10. "Waves" (Produced with Hudson Mohawke, Charlie Heat, Mike Dean & Metro Boomin); 11. "FML" (Produced with Mitus, Metro Boomin, Goldstein & Mike Dean); 12. "Real Friends" (Produced with Boi-1da & Frank Dukes); 13. "Wolves" (Produced with Cashmere Cat, Sinjin Hawke & Mike Dean); 14. "Frank's Track" (Produced with Cashmere Cat & Sinjin Hawke); 15. "Siiiiiiiiilver Surffffeeeeer Intermission"; 16. "30 Hours" (Produced with Karriem Riggins & Mike Dean); 17. "No More Parties in LA" (Produced with Madlib); 18. "Facts (Charlie Heat Version)" (Produced with Metro Boomin, Southside & Charlie Heat); 19. "Fade" (Produced with Kilhoffer, Benji B & Mike Dean); 20. "Saint Pablo" {Produced with Mike Dean & Ritter} | | |
| 2016 | Drake | Views | 03. "U with Me?" {produced with Noah "40" Shebib, DJ Dahi, Ricci Riera, Axlfolie, Vinylz and OZ}; 04. "Feel No Ways" {produced with Jordan Ullman and Noah "40" Shebib} | | |
| 2016 | Chance the Rapper | Coloring Book | 01. "All We Got" (featuring Kanye West and Chicago Children's Choir) {produced with The Social Experiment} | | |
| 2016 | G.O.O.D. Music | Cruel Winter | "Champions" {produced with Low Pros, Fonzworth Bentley, Noah Goldstein, Mike Dean and Charlie Heat} | | |
| 2017 | Drake | More Life | 18. "Glow" {produced with Noah "40" Shebib and Noah Goldstein}; 00. "Two Birds, One Stone" {produced with Noah "40" Shebib} | | |
| 2018 | Migos | Culture II | 04. "BBO (Bad Bitches Only)" (featuring 21 Savage) {produced with Buddah Bless, DJ Durel and Quavo} | Quality Control Music | |
| 2018 | Pusha T | DAYTONA | Album | | |
| 2018 | Kanye West | ye | Album | | |
| 2018 | KIDS SEE GHOSTS | KIDS SEE GHOSTS | 01. "Feel the Love" (featuring Pusha T); 02. "Fire"; 03. "4th Dimension" (featuring Louis Prima); 04. "Freeee (Ghost Town Pt. 2)"; 06. "Kids See Ghosts" | GOOD Music/Def Jam Recordings | |
| 2018 | Nas | NASIR | Album | Def Jam Recordings | |
| 2018 | Teyana Taylor | K.T.S.E. | Album | | |
| 2018 | Christina Aguilera | Liberation | 03. "Maria" (produced with Che Pope, Hudson Mohawke, Noah Goldstein); 12. "Accelerate" (featuring Ty Dolla $ign & 2 Chainz) {produced with Mike Dean, Che Pope, Charlie Heat, Honorable C.N.O.T.E., Eric Danchick} | RCA Records | |
| 2018 | Lil Pump | Harverd Dropout | 03. "I Love It (with Kanye West) {produced with DJ Clark Kent, CBMix & Ronny J} | Warner Records | |
| 2019 | Nas | The Lost Tapes 2 | 14. "You Mean the World to Me" | Mass Appeal Records | |
| 2019 | Pusha T | Non-album single | "Sociopath" (featuring Kash Doll); "Coming Home" (featuring Ms. Lauryn Hill) | | |
| 2019 | Post Malone | Hollywood's Bleeding | Internet {produced with BloodPop, Dahi & Louis Bell} | Republic Records | |
| 2019 | Francis and the Lights | Non-album single | "Take Me to the Light" (featuring Bon Iver and Kanye West) | | |
| 2019 | Kanye West | Jesus Is King | Album | GOOD Music | |
| 2019 | Sunday Service Choir | Jesus Is Born | Album | INC | |
| 2020 | Teyana Taylor | The Album | 22. "Made It" {Produced with Nova Wav and BoogzDaBeast}; 23. "We Got Love" (featuring Ms. Lauryn Hill) {Produced with Johan Lenox, Seven Aurelius, Mike Dean, E*Vax & Boogz} | GOOD Music | |
| 2020 | Playboi Carti | Whole Lotta Red | 2. "Go2DaMoon" (featuring Kanye West) {Produced with Wheezy} | Interscope Records | |
| 2020 | Sunday Service Choir | Emmanuel | 1. "Requiem Aeternam"; 2. "O Mira Nox"; 3. "O Magnum Mysterium"; 4. "Puer"; 5. "Gloria" | INC | |
| 2021 | DMX | Exodus | 13. "Prayer" {Produced with Fonzworth Bentley and BoogzDaBeast} | Def Jam Recordings | |
| 2021 | Pop Smoke | Faith | 3. "Tell the Vision" (featuring Kanye West and Pusha-T) {Produced with Jahlil Beats, Rico Beats, FnZ, SethInTheKitchen & Boogz} | Republic Records | |
| 2021 | Abstract Mindstate | Dreams Still Inspire | 1. "Salutations (Intro)" (featuring Jonquia Rose); 2. "I Feel Good"; 3. "A Wise Tale"; 4. "YZY SND (skit)" (featuring Luka Sabbat); 5. "Elevation"; 6. "Move Yo Body" (featuring The World Famous Tony Williams); 7. "Social Media"; 8. "LamboTruck Podcast (Skit)" (featuring Luka Sabbat); 9. "Expository Mode"; 10. "My Reality"; 11. "Sound Off The Alarm"; 12. "Voice Mail (Interlude)" (featuring Deon Cole); 13. "The Brenda Song" (featuring Kanye West); 14. "I Know You" | YZY SND | |
| 2021 | Kanye West | Donda | Album | GOOD Music | |
| 2021 | Lil Nas X | Montero | 3. "Industry Baby" (featuring Jack Harlow) {produced with Take a Daytrip} | Columbia Records | |
| 2021 | Young Thug | Punk | 7. "Rich Nigga Shit" (featuring Juice WRLD) {produced with Pi'erre Bourne} | YSL/Atlantic Records | |
| 2021 | Asaad | New Black History Month iii | 1. "Crime Pays 01" {produced with Nascent} | Last Days Records | |
| 2022 | Kanye West | Donda 2 | Album | Self-Released | |
| 2022 | Nigo | I Know Nigo! | 8. "Hear Me Clearly" (with Pusha T) {Produced with Boogzdabeast, Luca Starz & ThaMyind} | Republic Records/Victor Victor | |
| 2022 | Fivio Foreign | B.I.B.L.E. | 4. "City of Gods" {featuring Kanye West & Alicia Keys){produced with AyoAA, Hemz, Lil Mav, Ojivolta, The Chainsmokers, Tweek Tune & Tommy Rush} | RichFish/Columbia Records | |
| 2022 | Pusha T | It's Almost Dry | 3. "Dreamin of the Past" (featuring Kanye West); 5. "Just So You Remember" {produced with BoogzDaBeast, FnZ}; 6. "Diet Coke" {produced with 88-Keys}; 7. "Rock N Roll" (featuring Kanye West and Kid Cudi) {produced with Pharrell Williams}; 10. "Hear Me Clearly" (featuring Nigo) {produced with BoogzDaBeast, Luca Starz, ThaMyind}; 12. "I Pray For You" (featuring Labrinth and No Malice) {produced with Labrinth} | GOOD Music/Def Jam Recordings | |
| 2022 | Vory | Lost Souls | 2. "Daylight" (featuring Kanye West) {produced with 88-Keys and E*vax} | UMG Recordings | |
| 2023 | Tyler, the Creator | CALL ME IF YOU GET LOST: The Estate Sale | "HEAVEN TO ME" {produced with Tyler, the Creator} {"Heaven" by John Legend instrumental} | Columbia Records | |
| 2023 | Travis Scott | Utopia | 2. "Thank God" {produced with Scott, Ritter, FnZ, WondaGurl & BoogzDaBeast}; 5. "God's Country" {produced with 30 Roc & Dez Wright}; 18. "Telekinesis" {produced with Scott & BoogzDaBeast} | Cactus Jack Records/Epic Records | |
| 2024 | ¥$ | Vultures 1 | Album | YZY | |
| 2024 | ¥$ | Vultures 2 | Album | YZY | |
| 2025 | Playboi Carti | Music | 10. "BACKD00R" (featuring Kendrick Lamar and Jhené Aiko) {produced with Ojivolta, Twisco, Keanu Beats, Nagra & Darius Rameshni} | Interscope Records | |
| 2025 | Kanye West | Bully V1 | 1. "Preacher Man"; 2. "Beauty and the Beast"; 3. "White Lines"; 4. "Last Breath"; 5. "Bully"; 6. "Can't Hurry Love"; 7. "Circles"; 8. "Highs and Lows"; 9. "This One Here" {produced with Okami}; 10. "Melrose" (featuring Ty Dolla Sign and Playboi Carti) {produced with Ojivolta and TheLabCook} | YZY | |
| 2025 | Kanye West | Cuck | 1. "WW3"; 7. "Cousins" | YZY | |
| 2026 | Kanye West | Bully - Deluxe | Album | YZY/Gamma | |
