= List of awards and nominations received by Common =

This is a list of awards and award nominations received by Common, the American hip hop recording artist, actor, film producer and poet.

== Academy Awards ==
Year	Nominee / work	Award	Result
2015	"Glory" (with John Legend)	Best Original Song	Won
2018	"Stand Up for Something" (with Diane Warren)	Best Original Song	Nominated

== African-American Film Critics Association ==
Year	Nominee / work	Award	Result
2014	"Glory" (with John Legend)	Best Music	Won

== BET Awards ==
Year	Nominee / work	Award	Result
2003	"Love of My Life (An Ode to Hip-Hop)" (with Erykah Badu)	Video of the Year	Won
2003	"Love of My Life (An Ode to Hip-Hop)" (with Erykah Badu)	Viewer's Choice	Won
2003	"Love of My Life (An Ode to Hip-Hop)" (with Erykah Badu)	Best Collaboration	Nominated
2006	Himself	Best Male Hip Hop Artist	Nominated
2008	Himself	Best Male Hip Hop Artist	Nominated
2009	Himself	Best Actor	Nominated
2012	Himself	Best Actor	Nominated
2012	Himself	Centric Award	Won
2013	Himself	Best Actor	Nominated
2015	Himself	Best Male Hip Hop Artist	Nominated
2015	"Glory" (with John Legend)	Video of the Year	Nominated
2015	"Glory" (with John Legend)	Best Collaboration	Won

== BET Hip Hop Awards ==
Year	Nominee / work	Award	Result
2006	"Testify"	Hip-Hop Video of the Year	Nominated
2006	Himself	Lyricist of the Year	Won
2007	Himself	Lyricist of the Year	Won
2007	Himself	MVP of the Year	Nominated
2007	Himself	Best Live Performance	Nominated
2007	"The People"	Best Hip Hop Video	Nominated
2007	Finding Forever	CD of the Year	Won
2012	The Dreamer/The Believer	CD of the Year	Nominated
2014	"Kingdom" (featuring Vince Staples)	Impact Track	Won
2015	"Glory" (From The Motion Picture Selma) (with John Legend)	Impact Track	Nominated

== Black Reel Awards ==
Year	Nominee / work	Award	Result
2003	"Love of My Life (An Ode to Hip-Hop)" (with Erykah Badu)	Best Original or Adapted Song	Won
2015	"Glory" (with John Legend)	Best Original or Adapted Song	Won

== CMT Music Awards ==
Year	Nominee / work	Award	Result
2018	"Stand Up for Something"	CMT Performance of the Year	Nominated

== Critics' Choice Movie Awards ==
Year	Nominee / work	Award	Result
2015	"Glory" (with John Legend)	Best Song	Won

== Georgia Film Critics Association ==
Year	Nominee / work	Award	Result
2015	"Glory" (with John Legend)	Best Original Song	Won

== Golden Globe Awards ==
Year	Nominee / work	Award	Result
2015	"Glory" (with John Legend)	Best Original Song	Won

== Grammy Awards ==
Year	Nominee / work	Award	Result	Ref.
2001	"The Light"	Best Rap Solo Performance	Nominated	
2003	"Love of My Life (An Ode to Hip-Hop)" (with Erykah Badu)	Best Song Written for a Motion Picture, Television or Other Visual Media	Nominated	
2003	"Love of My Life (An Ode to Hip-Hop)" (with Erykah Badu)	Best R&B Song	Won	
2003	"Love of My Life (An Ode to Hip-Hop)" (with Erykah Badu)	Best Urban/Alternative Performance	Nominated	
2006	"They Say" (featuring Kanye West & John Legend)	Best Rap/Sung Collaboration	Nominated	
2006	"Testify"	Best Rap Solo Performance	Nominated	
2006	"The Corner" (featuring The Last Poets)	Best Rap Performance by a Duo or Group	Nominated	
2006	Be	Best Rap Album	Nominated	
2008	Finding Forever	Best Rap Album	Nominated	
2008	"The People"	Best Rap Solo Performance	Nominated	
2008	"Southside" (featuring Kanye West)	Best Rap Performance by a Duo or Group	Won	
2010	"Make Her Say" (with Kid Cudi & Kanye West)	Best Rap Performance by a Duo or Group	Nominated	
2010	Universal Mind Control	Best Rap Album	Nominated	
2011	"Wake Up Everybody" (with John Legend, The Roots & Melanie Fiona)	Best Rap/Sung Collaboration	Nominated	
2015	"Blak Majik" (featuring Jhené Aiko)	Best Rap/Sung Collaboration	Nominated	
2015	Nobody's Smiling	Best Rap Album	Nominated	
2016	"Glory" (with John Legend)	Best Rap Song	Nominated	
2016	"Glory" (with John Legend)	Best Rap/Sung Collaboration	Nominated	
2016	"Glory" (with John Legend)	Best Song Written for Visual Media	Won	
2018	"Stand Up For Something"	Best Song Written for Visual Media	Nominated	

== Houston Film Critics Society ==
Year	Nominee / work	Award	Result
2015	"Glory" (with John Legend)	Best Original Song	Nominated

== NAACP Image Awards ==
Year	Nominee / work	Award	Result
2003	"Love of My Life (An Ode to Hip-Hop)" (with Erykah Badu)	Outstanding Duo or Group	Nominated
2003	"Love of My Life (An Ode to Hip-Hop)" (with Erykah Badu)	Outstanding Song	Nominated
2003	"Love of My Life (An Ode to Hip-Hop)" (with Erykah Badu)	Outstanding Music Video	Nominated
2006	Himself	Outstanding Male Artist	Nominated
2006	"Testify"	Outstanding Music Video	Nominated
2006	"Testify"	Outstanding Song	Nominated
2008	Himself	Outstanding Male Artist	Nominated
2009	Himself	Outstanding Male Artist	Nominated
2012	Himself	Outstanding Male Artist	Nominated
2015	Himself	Outstanding Supporting Actor in a Motion Picture	Won

== MTV Video Music Awards ==
Year	Nominee / work	Award	Result
2001	"The Sound of Illadelph (Geto Heaven Remix)"	Breakthrough Video	Nominated
2003	"Come Close"	MTV2 Award	Nominated
2005	"Go!"	Best Hip-Hop Video	Nominated
2006	"Testify"	Best Hip-Hop Video	Nominated
2006	"Testify"	Best Direction (Director: Anthony Mandler)	Nominated
2006	"Testify"	Best Art Direction (Art Director: David Ross)	Nominated

== Primetime Emmy Awards ==
Year	Nominee / work	Award	Result
2017	13th ("Letter To The Free")	Outstanding Original Music and Lyrics	Won

== Soul Train Music Awards ==
Year	Nominee / work	Award	Result
2003	"Love of My Life (An Ode to Hip-Hop)"	Best R&B/Soul Single – Female	Nominated
2006	"Supastar"	Best R&B/Soul Single – Group, Band or Duo	Nominated
2006	"Testify"	Best R&B/Soul or Rap Music Video	Nominated
2015	"Glory"	Best Song of the Year	Nominated
2015	"Glory"	The Ashford & Simpson Songwriter's Award	Won
2015	"Glory"	Best Collaboration	Nominated

== Teen Choice Awards ==
Year	Nominee / work	Award	Result
2017	John Wick: Chapter 2 (with Keanu Reeves)	Choice Movie: Fight	Nominated

== Vibe Awards ==
Year	Nominee / work	Award	Result
2005	"The Corner"	Reelest Video	Nominated
