= Bittersweet Poetry =

2007 song by Kanye West

Song by Kanye West featuring John Mayer

from the album Graduation (Deluxe Edition)
- Released: September 11, 2007
- Recorded: 2004
- Genre: Hip-hop
- Length: 4:01
- Label: Roc-A-Fella; Def Jam
- Songwriters: Kanye West; John Mayer; General Johnson; Gregory Perry
- Producers: Kanye West; Jon Brion

"Bittersweet Poetry" (Note: Written in Japanese as "ビタースウィート・ポエトリー"; originally known as "Bittersweet".) is a song by American rapper Kanye West featuring Amercian singer John Mayer, with backing vocals from Keyshia Cole. It was released as a bonus track for the Japanese-exclusive deluxe edition of West's studio album, Graduation (2007). It was originally recorded for his previous album, Late Registration (2005), but was kept unreleased due to not fitting the soundscape of the album. The song was solely written by West and Mayer. American singers General Johnson and Gregory Perry were credited as songwriters due to the song interpolating "Bittersweet" by Chairmen of the Board.

Lyrically, "Bittersweet Poetry" is about heartbreak, with West recalling experiences in his past relationship. The song received generally positive reviews from music critics, who have referred to it as a "deep cut." Some praised Mayer's feature and delivery, while others criticized it for his "blandness." A studio session for an early version of the song was recorded and aired on MTV News. In 2005, West performed the song live on Def Poetry Jam alongside Rhymefest's "Brand New" (2005).

== Background and recording ==
John Mayer (pictured) had previously worked with West in 2004 for Common's album Be.

Kanye West and John Mayer had previously worked together to write "Go!", a song from American rapper Common's sixth studio album Be (2005). After seeing the 2004 biographical film Ray, West and Mayer decided to collaborate on a record and quicklt went to a recording studio to compose "Go!". The two of them went to the Record Plant, a recording studio in Los Angeles. When asked about his newfound presence in hip-hop, Mayer said, "It's not music out there right now. That's why, to me, hip-hop is where rock used to be."

West began to collaborate with Mayer for "Bittersweet Poetry" shortly after the release of The College Dropout and the announcement of Late Registration in 2004. The song was initially intended for the latter album, being one of the first songs recorded for Late Registration. West and Mayer composed the song—then titled "Bittersweet"—at a recording studio, with backing vocals from singer Keyshia Cole. A session for the song was recorded and published by MTV News, a division of cable television channel MTV. Later that year, West and record producer 9th Wonder were exchanging songs in West's hotel room. 9th Wonder played songs which he produced for girl group Destiny's Child and "Lovin' It" by hip-hop duo Little Brother. West played "Bittersweet", alongside demos of Late Registration songs "Celebration" and "Late". In 2005, West performed an a cappella of "Bittersweet" on Def Poetry Jam, a spoken word poetry television series. He performed it along with his verse from rapper Rhymefest's "Brand New". West later discussed the song at the 2005 Billboard Music Awards in December, after Late Registration had released. He stated that the song was going to appear on his next album, joking that he "only [gets] to perform one song at the Grammys." Prior to this, West had previously talked about the song backstage at the 2004 BMA show. The track surfaced online in June 2007, three months before the release of Graduation.

== Composition and lyrics ==
"Bittersweet Poetry"
While West raps about relationship troubles, Mayer sings an interpolation of "Bittersweet" by Chairmen of the Board.

"Bittersweet Poetry" is built around stringed instruments. It contains an interpolation of the 1972 song "Bittersweet" by soul group Chairmen of the Board, written by American singers General Johnson and Gregory Perry. Lyrically, the song is about going through heartbreak after a breakup. West describes being emotionally affected by his partner's words, saying they cut "like surgery." He acknowledges that he was "too proud to admit that it was hurting", that his pride had prevented him from expressing emotional vulnerability. West reflects on experiences from his relationship: "I been thinking, and it got me back to sinking and this relationship it even got me back to drinking all this Hennessy". Rhyming "I'mma be the bigger man / Big pimpin' like Jigga, man," West references the 2001 song "Big Pimpin'" by fellow rapper Jay-Z, whom he had been producing for and collaborating with since before his debut. Although singer Keyshia Cole recorded backing vocals for the song, she was not credited as a featured artist.

== Release and promotion ==
Because West felt that "Bittersweet Poetry" did not fit the overall soundscape of Late Registration, he subsequently decided to not include it on the album. To promote the song, a recording session of "Bittersweet Poetry" from 2004 was aired by MTV News, and West performed an early version of the song on Def Poetry Jam. The song was later released as the second bonus track on the Japanese deluxe edition of Graduation. It appeared alongside another bonus track, "Good Night", featuring rappers Al Be Back and Mos Def.

== Critical reception ==
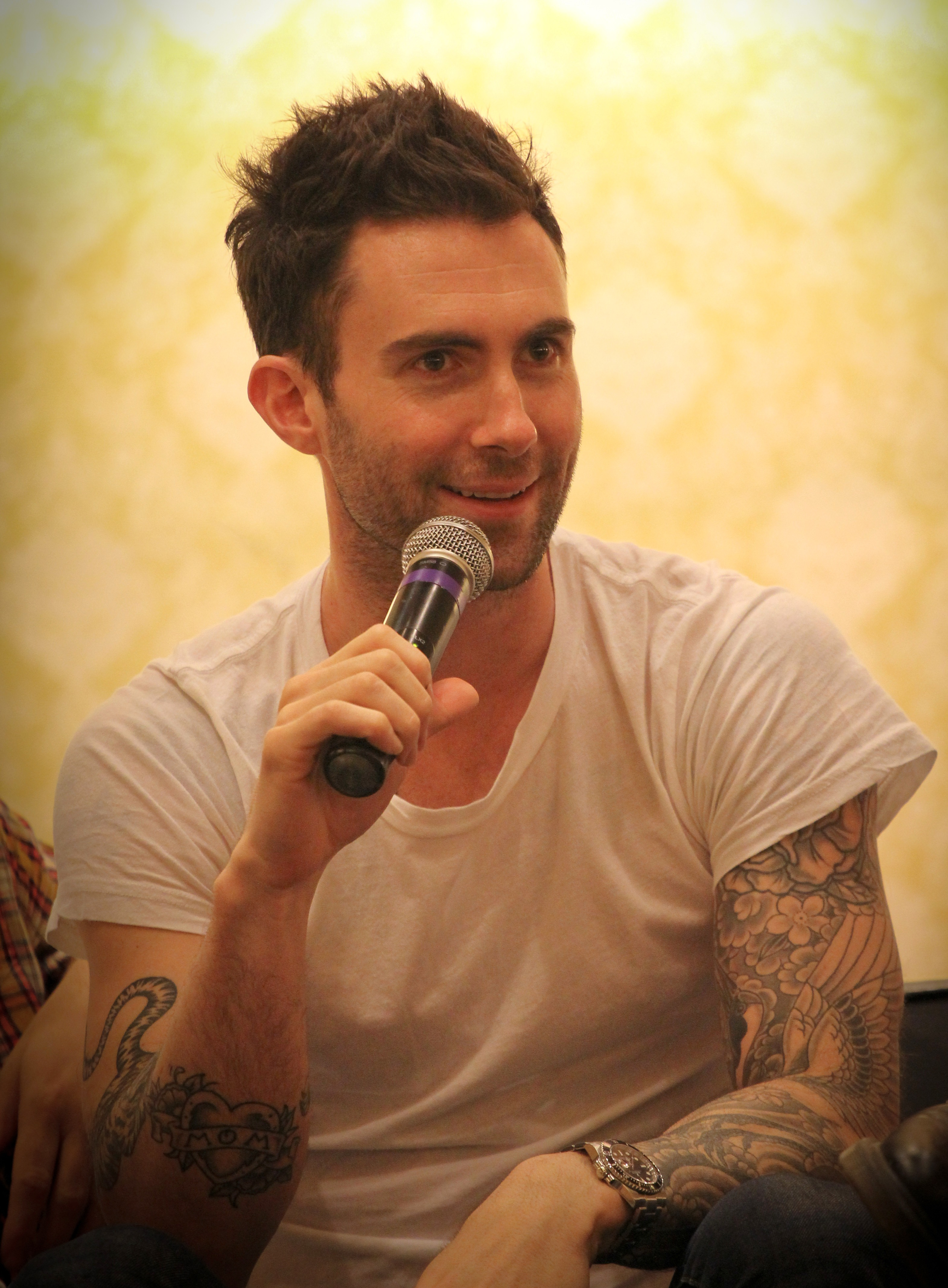
Critics compared Mayer's chorus to Adam Levine's feature on "Heard 'Em Say".

"Bittersweet Poetry" received generally positive reviews from music critics. The track has been typically referred to as an obscure "deep cut", with it being released exclusively in Japan. Chris Tart, writing for HotNewHipHop, felt that "Bittersweet Poetry" could have "totally fit" as a regular song on Graduation, and was surprised that West did not release it on standard versions of the album. He also stated that the song had international success outside of Japan as well, while noting West's "crossover appeal" with Mayer. XXL commented on the collaboration itself, stating that West experimenting with the song proved that he had "never been one to shy away from taking a musical risk." Slant Magazine's Vadim Rizov praised Mayer's chorus, describing it as "guiltily irresistible" and comparing it to Adam Levine's feature on West's song "Heard 'Em Say". He stated that Levine's chorus redeemed his band Maroon 5, while "Bittersweet Poetry" "rehabilitated" Mayer. However, the song also received negative criticism. Amelie Gillette of The A.V. Club wrote that the song "captured Mayer's blandness and Kanye's ability to go through the motions," while sounding like a musical parody of itself.

== Credits and personnel ==
Credits adapted from multiple sources.

- Kanye West – performer, songwriter, producer
- John Mayer – performer, songwriter
- Keyshia Cole – additional vocals
- Jon Brion – producer
- General Johnson – songwriter
- Gregory Perry – songwriter
