= Lunch Money (song) =

Single by Pusha T
- Released: November 19, 2014
- Recorded: 2013
- Genre: Hip hop
- Length: 2:51
- Label: GOOD; Def Jam
- Songwriter(s): Terrence Thornton
- Producer(s): Kanye West

Pusha T singles chronology
"Numbers on the Boards" (2013)	"Lunch Money" (2014)

"Lunch Money" is a song by American rapper Pusha T, and is produced by Kanye West. On November 19, 2014, the song was officially released as the album's first official single by G.O.O.D. Music and Def Jam Recordings. On December 16, 2014, the music video was released for "Lunch Money"; it was directed by Emil Nava.

== Music video ==
The music video for "Lunch Money" was directed by Emil Nava. In the video, a sting operation unveils a ton of unexpected surveillance footage. The footage mixes moments of dancers having fun with eerie shots.

== Track listing ==
No.	Title	Writer(s)	Producer	Length
1.	"Lunch Money"	Thornton; Kanye West	Kanye West	2:51

== Critical and commercial reception ==
The track picked up praise from publications such as Rolling Stone, with the song described as having a "druggy, psychedelic haze" to it.
