= The Food =

2004 single by Kanye West and Common

Single by Common featuring Kanye West and DJ Dummy

from the album Be
- Released: October 8, 2004
- Recorded: 2004
- Studio: Sony Music Studios (New York); The Dave Chappelle Show (New York)
- Genre: Hip-hop; conscious hip-hop
- Length: 3:36
- Label: GOOD; Geffen
- Songwriters: Lonnie Lynn; Kanye West; Sam Cooke; Eugene Record; Stanley McKenney
- Producer: Kanye West

Common singles chronology
"Panthers" (2004)	"The Food" (2004)	"The Corner" (2005)

Kanye West singles chronology
"The New Workout Plan" (2004)	"The Food" (2004)	"I Changed My Mind" (2004)

"The Food" is the first single by rapper Common released on his sixth album Be. Kanye West appears on the song's chorus and also produces the track. West interpolates "Nothing Can Change This Love" by Sam Cooke for the song's beat. In addition, DJ Dummy scratches on the song and Dave Chappelle introduces the live version of it. The song was originally performed live on Chappelle's Show on March 3, 2004. This live version is featured on Be, although a studio version does also exist. The studio version was released on The 20th Anniversary Edition of “Be” Which Released on May 23, 2025

It received mostly positive acclaim, but was not promoted heavily and did not chart. IGN.com writer Spence D. describes it as a "nice and mild burner that showcases the Chi-town duo's symmetry." Nathan Brackett of Rolling Stone states that it is one of the "hardest-rocking tracks of Common's career."

== Track listing ==
=== A-side ===
1. "The Food (Dirty)"
2. "The Food (radio)"

=== B-side ===
1. "The Food (instrumental)"
2. "The Food (Live Version from Chappelle's Show)"

== See also ==
- List of Common songs
