= The Modulations =

1970s American band

The Modulations were an American R&B vocal group from Durham, North Carolina consisting of singer-songwriters Larry Allen, Larry Duncan, Hoyle Saunders and Henry Channelle. The other group of Modulations that sung with Glenn Jones are not affiliated with this group. The group from the Bull City, Durham's nickname, had some success with the singles "I'm Hopelessly in Love" (1973) and "I Can't Fight Your Love" (1974), both of which were included on the Modulations' self-produced album, It's Rough Out Here, released in '75 and featuring arrangements by Vince Montana, Norman Harris, and Ronnie Baker and instrumentation by members of MFSB. The album was later reissued in Japan and the UK.

== Discography ==
It's Rough Out Here (Buddah Records, 1975)

1. Rough Out Here (Rodney Brown, Bob Curington, Tylon Lester, Willie Lester)
2. Head On Collision With Heartbreak (Brown, Curington, Lester, Lester)
3. Love at Last (Curington, Lester, Lester)
4. I'll Always Love You (Brown, Curington)
5. I'm Hopelessly in Love (Joe Blunt, Brown, Curington, Lester, Lester)
6. I Can't Fight Your Love (Brown, Curington)
7. Worth Your Weight in Gold (Curington, Lester, Lester)
8. Those Were the Best Days of My Life (Brown, Curington)
9. Share What You Got, Keep What You Need (Blunt, Brown, Curington, Lester, Lester)

Bonus tracks:

1. What Good Am I
2. Your Love Has Me Locked Up
3. I Can't Fight Your Love [7" Version]
4. Worth Your Weight in Gold [7" Version]
5. Somebody's Been Messin'
