= Diamonds from Sierra Leone =

2005 single by Kanye West

Single by Kanye West

from the album Late Registration
- Released: May 2005
- Recorded: 2004–05
- Studio: The Record Plant (Hollywood); Grandmaster Recording (Hollywood)
- Genre: Hip hop
- Length: 3:58
- Label: Roc-A-Fella; Def Jam
- Songwriters: Kanye West; Devo Harris; John Barry; Don Black
- Producers: Kanye West; Jon Brion; Devo Springsteen

Kanye West singles chronology
"The Corner" (2005)	"Diamonds from Sierra Leone" (2005)	"Go!" (2005)

Music video
- "Diamonds from Sierra Leone" on YouTube

"Diamonds from Sierra Leone" (originally "Diamonds") is a song by American rapper Kanye West from his second studio album, Late Registration (2005). The song was released as a bonus track in May 2005. The song was produced by West, Jon Brion, and Devo Springsteen. The producers, with the exception of Brion, are credited as songwriters alongside John Barry and Don Black, who both received credit due to their composition being sampled. The song was initially centered around the demise of Roc-A-Fella Records, though was later re-recorded once West learned about blood diamonds in Sierra Leone. West premiered the song for Hot 97 on April 20, 2005, before it was sent to American mainstream radio stations the following month as the album's lead single, through Roc-A-Fella and Def Jam. In the chorus, West interpolated the phrase "forever ever, forever ever" from Outkast's "Ms. Jackson".

A hip hop song, "Diamonds from Sierra Leone" features a sample of "Diamonds Are Forever", performed by Shirley Bassey. Lyrically, it sees West connect his material wealth to Sierra Leone's blood diamonds and the resulting Sierra Leone Civil War. The song received generally positive reviews from music critics, who mostly complimented West's lyricism. They often emphasized the rapper's focus on his status, while some critics praised the sampling of "Diamonds Are Forever". The song was awarded Best Rap Song at the 48th Annual Grammy Awards and won one of the Pop Awards at the 2006 BMI London Awards, before being named by Slant Magazine as among the best singles of the 2000s decade.

In the United States, the song peaked at number 43 on the Billboard Hot 100 and number 21 on the Hot R&B/Hip-Hop Songs chart in 2005. "Diamonds from Sierra Leone" reached number eight in the United Kingdom, alongside attaining top 20 positions in Denmark, Finland, Ireland, and Norway. It has since been certified platinum and silver in the US and the UK by the Recording Industry Association of America (RIAA) and British Phonographic Industry (BPI), respectively. An accompanying black and white music video was released on June 15, 2005. In the video, scenes of children experiencing rough diamond mining in Sierra Leone are displayed, being accompanied at points by a De Beers commercial and cuts of West wandering around Prague. It received a nomination for Outstanding Music Video at the 2006 MTV Video Music Awards Japan. West performed the song at the Coachella Valley Music and Arts Festival and the Glastonbury Festival in 2006 and 2015, respectively.

A remix of "Diamonds from Sierra Leone", featuring Jay-Z, was sent to American radio stations by Roc-A-Fella and Def Jam on June 15, 2005. The remix also samples Bassey's "Diamonds Are Forever" and sees Jay-Z rapping in the second part. Lyrically, it includes references to deaths of civilians in blood diamond mines and tension around consumerism. The remix garnered mostly positive responses from critics; they commonly appreciated the subject matter and some commended Jay-Z's appearance. It was ranked amongst best-of lists by multiple publications, including Dagsavisen and Rockdelux in 2005. West and Jay-Z performed the remix at the 2005 Summer Jam.

== Background and recording ==
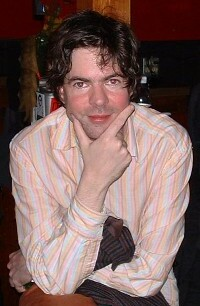
Jon Brion contributed production to the song, after becoming involved with West through Rick Rubin.

American record producer and composer Jon Brion had achieved fame from his distinctive production work for artists and film scores for auteurs, though was lacking experience in hip hop. West became a fan of singer-songwriter Fiona Apple whom Brion had produced for; while watching 2004 film Eternal Sunshine of the Spotless Mind, he appreciated Brion's score. The pair became connected via their mutual friend Rick Rubin; West quickly phoned Brion and they instantly formed chemistry with each other. West enlisted him to work on Late Registration, marking Brion's first involvement in a hip-hop project; the decision created confused reactions across his fanbase. Brion imagined people commenting that West has "gone off his rocker" and envisioning him making "an art record with some crazy, left-field music guy", clarifying this not to be "the case whatsoever". The producer recalled West taking charge of production with his strong vision and mentioned the rapper's "quick, intuitive decisions". Filmmaker Michel Gondry worked on "Diamonds from Sierra Leone" due to being in a studio where Brion had set up a drum kit one day.

The song's production was handled by West, Brion, and Devo Springsteen, all of whom co-wrote it apart from Brion. John Barry and Don Black also received songwriting credits because of the sample of singer Shirley Bassey's titular theme song for the 1971 James Bond film Diamonds Are Forever, which they wrote. Bassey revealed in September 2005 that she "didn't know anything about the song before its release" and assumed West did not request permission "to have me singing on his song", recalling not knowing of it until hearing West "performing it at the Live8 concert". She also alluded to a lack of contact "from his record company, which wasn't very nice". Bassey desired "to look into" West's usage of her vocals since he was "very cheeky", asserting that "one way or another he is going to have to pay me a lot of money". According to British media law specialist Elin Pinnell, a recording deal's "certain rights to your work to various different people" who allow its media exploitation and the likelihood of West gaining permission from one of Bassey's representatives meant he was probably guilty of no wrongdoing. Bassey differed in her opinion of West around two years after the comments, finding the sample impressive and feeling keen to collaborate with him.

Location of Sierra Leone in Africa (dark blue)

The song was originally recorded under the title of "Diamonds", being about West's "posse" and their everlasting strong bond. West recalled that when he played the song for fellow rapper Q-Tip after they first met, the rapper told him about the blood diamonds from Sierra Leone, which were mined in a war area and sold internationally in an illegal manner for parliamentary funding. This led to West re-recording it as "Diamonds from Sierra Leone", and reading about the issue of conflict diamonds and how their sales were continuing a violent civil war in Sierra Leone, though the track still included the original's lyrics. He set out to do whatever he "could to learn more and educate people about the problem" from this point onwards, being enthusiastic to rap about it. The recording was also delayed by West and Brion waiting two weeks to rent a harpsichord for the track. West premiered it via Hot 97 on April 20, 2005, with fellow rapper Jay-Z telling radio personality Angie Martinez that West was not comfortable with the debut until mixing had been done about 14 times. The rapper cited memories of Jay-Z's Blueprint Lounge Tour (2001) and recollections of being among the movement of his record label Roc-A-Fella as inspiration for the song, adding that he still maintained a friendship with former chief executive officer Dame Dash.

== Composition and lyrics ==
"Diamonds from Sierra Leone"
A 19-second snippet of "Diamonds from Sierra Leone", featuring a sped-up sample of "Diamonds Are Forever" by Shirley Bassey. This is accompanied by guitars, keyboards, strings, and live drums, over which West links his material wealth gathered from fame with the illegal diamond trade in Sierra Leone.

Musically, "Diamonds from Sierra Leone" is a hip hop song. The song contains a sped-up and looped sample of Bassey's "Diamonds Are Forever", written by Barry and Black, the former of whom also arranged and conducted the recording. According to West, the song reminds him of "athletes running", "somebody boxing", and "working out when it gets really hype"; he envisioned it as "the soundtrack to your life". The song features a heavy groove. It has a lush arrangement that is constructed around the Bassey sample, including keyboards accompanied by strings and harpsichords. The song contains guitars, contributed by record producer Dave Tozer. Live drums are also present, which were played by Gondry. West said he expresses "the musicality" on the song by providing "40 bars", rather than putting out "something that was more radio". On the song's chorus, West's tone ascends.

In the lyrics of "Diamonds from Sierra Leone", West links the material wealth that fame brought him with Sierra Leone's civil war and the illegal diamond trade causing it, alongside showing off his status. West looks at potentially receiving his desired level of praise, asking: "If you talkin' 'bout classics, do my name get brought up?" On the chorus, West offers his "forever ever ever EVER ever" loyalty to Roc-A-Fella. He recalls when he lost New Artist of the Year to Gretchen Wilson at the American Music Awards of 2004 on the song, criticizing himself for throwing a tantrum over it. West also addresses his relationship with Dash: "You know the next question, 'Yo, where's Dame at?'/ This track's the Indian dance to bring our reign back."

== Release and reception ==
In May 2005, the song was sent to American mainstream radio stations by West's labels Roc-A-Fella and Def Jam as the lead single from the album. On June 21, the labels released the song on vinyl in the United States. A CD for the song was later made available by Universal in the US on August 2, 2005. "Diamonds from Sierra Leone" was eventually included as the twentieth track on West's second studio album Late Registration on August 30, 2005.

The song was met with generally positive reviews from music critics, with them frequently praising the lyrical content. Writing for The Guardian, Alexis Petridis noted it showcases West's unique role of the only popular rapper taking on politics by drawing "the links between the jewellery trade and Sierra Leone's civil war", being impressed with his attempt to discuss topics outside of his wealth and how funny "shooting people is, which is more than you can say for his contemporaries". AllMusic's Andy Kellman picked the song as an example of West using identical lyrical strategies to his debut studio album The College Dropout (2004), citing how he goes from "boastful to rueful". Kellman continued, seeing more importance in how "the conflict felt in owning blood diamonds will be lost on those who couldn't afford one with years of combined income", and also felt West demonstrates strength as "a pure writer" for mentioning uncovered subjects on the song. A reviewer for Billboard detailed that heavier concerns are expressed on the song in comparison to other tracks on the album, "further expanding West's reach". The staff of the Manchester Evening News saw the song as being built by reworking Bassey's "vocal styling" from "Diamonds Are Forever" with "an electro-tinged twist", assuring that the lyrical content is "simply toasting West's stardom".

In a review for Uncut, Simon Reynolds noticed that the song's "giddy ascending chorus" demonstrates West pledging true loyalty to Roc-A-Fella after the label saved him from uncertain times, as well as commenting on the rapper's chants seemingly "showing off his new status symbols" less than "his aesthetic riches". Reynolds thought the song is worthy of West's boasting "and then some", focusing on the Bassey sample maintaining his unmatchable sampling skills and also praising the lush production, which he considered to fit in with the lyrics. Rolling Stone critic Rob Sheffield depicted that the song weirdly spins a James Bond theme into "an ominous lament for slave labor". The Observer writer Kitty Empire stated the song did not only "loop a Shirley Bassey sample", but also constructed "lush arrangements around it". Veteran critic Robert Christgau wrote in a review for The Village Voice that "the treated John Barry" of the song is certain to "sneak up over the long haul". Nathan Rabin of The A.V. Club was less enthusiastic, saying it comes from the type of "larger-than-life emotions" that only sampling "Diamonds Are Forever" can channel properly and captures West's "manic exhilaration". Rabin further saw the song as "about the world racing along way too fast" and the sort of "scary sustained high" that appears to be never-ending, though felt "it echoes the less ambivalent joy" of fellow album tracks "Touch the Sky" and "We Major". David Browne from Entertainment Weekly criticized the song for being clumsy and consisting of "all defensive boasts".

=== Accolades ===
On Q's Readers 100 Greatest Tracks of 2005 list, "Diamonds from Sierra Leone" was voted in at number 69. The track was named by Slant Magazine as the 86th best single of the 2000s decade; Cataldo directed praise towards the "Diamonds Are Forever" sample and West's skill "at transposing first-world guilt into the personal sphere". In 2013, the results of a Rolling Stone readers' poll ranked it as West's ninth best song. The track won the Best Rap Song award at the 2006 Grammy Awards, alongside receiving one of the Pop Awards at the 2006 BMI London Awards. It garnered a nomination for the award of Outstanding Song at the 2006 NAACP Image Awards.

== Music video ==
In May 2005, it was reported that West was in Prague shooting a music video for "Diamonds from Sierra Leone", which was filmed over a three-day period. West explained that due to his heavy interest in architecture and art, he felt attracted to the city's sculptures, cathedrals, and stone floors. He elaborated by revealing the content as being set to be shot in black and white, representing "the music in 'Diamonds'", and said it "gives you a timeless feel". West later recalled that he came up with the video's concept after learning about blood diamonds. The music video was directed by Hype Williams, contrasting with West having served as the director of numerous visuals around 2005. It premiered through BET's series Access Granted on June 15, 2005, five days prior to being played for MTV's Total Request Live.

At the beginning of the music video, children are portrayed going through the horrific experience of diamond mining in Sierra Leone while watched closely by abusive supervisors. A supervisor holds up a diamond, before the scene transitions to mountains and then West standing around in a church. Footage of the children mining are juxtaposed with shots of West rapping in the empty streets of Prague, as well as a De Beers diamond commercial showing a wealthy man proposing to a woman with a ring that turns into blood after being placed on her finger. West goes on to drive his expensive car into a jewelry store, though jumps out before the vehicle makes impact. Shortly afterwards, he plays piano in a church as children run towards him. The video concludes with a message that reads "Please purchase conflict-free diamonds." It was nominated for the awards of Best Male Video and Outstanding Music Video at the 2006 MTV Video Music Awards Japan and the 2005 NAACP Image Awards, respectively.

== Commercial performance ==
"Diamonds from Sierra Leone" entered the US Billboard Hot 100 at number 94 for the chart issue dated May 21, 2005. The song reached number 83 in its third week on the Hot 100, before declining 11 places back to number 94 on the issue dated June 11, 2005. The following week, the song rebounded by 36 positions to number 58 on the chart. The song fell down the Hot 100 again by five places to number 63 on the issue dated June 25, 2005, though eventually surpassed the rebound position by peaking at number 43 in its 12th week on the chart. "Diamonds from Sierra Leone" lasted for 19 weeks on the Hot 100. The song further peaked at number 21 on the US Billboard Hot R&B/Hip-Hop Songs chart for the issue date of July 2, 2005. It debuted at number 18 on the US Hot Rap Songs chart issue dated May 14, 2005, ultimately climbing to number 11 three weeks later. The song further peaked at number 24 on the US Rhythmic chart. On November 20, 2018, "Diamonds from Sierra Leone" was certified platinum by the Recording Industry Association of America (RIAA) for pushing 1,000,000 certified units in the US.

The track was most successful in the United Kingdom, charting at number eight on the UK Singles Chart, which it spent 16 weeks on. For 2005, the track ranked at number 98 on the year-end chart. On October 4, 2019, the track was certified silver by the British Phonographic Industry (BPI) for sales of 200,000 units in the UK. As of October 24, it stands as West's 39th most successful track of all time in the country. The track experienced similar performance in Denmark, peaking at number nine on the Tracklisten Top 40. It reached numbers 16 and 17 on the Norwegian VG-lista Singles Top 20 and Finnish Singles Chart, respectively. The track also attained a top 20 position in Ireland, peaking at number 19 on the Irish Singles Chart. It was less successful in Sweden, charting at number 30 on the Sverigetopplistan Singles Top 100.

== Live performances and other usage ==
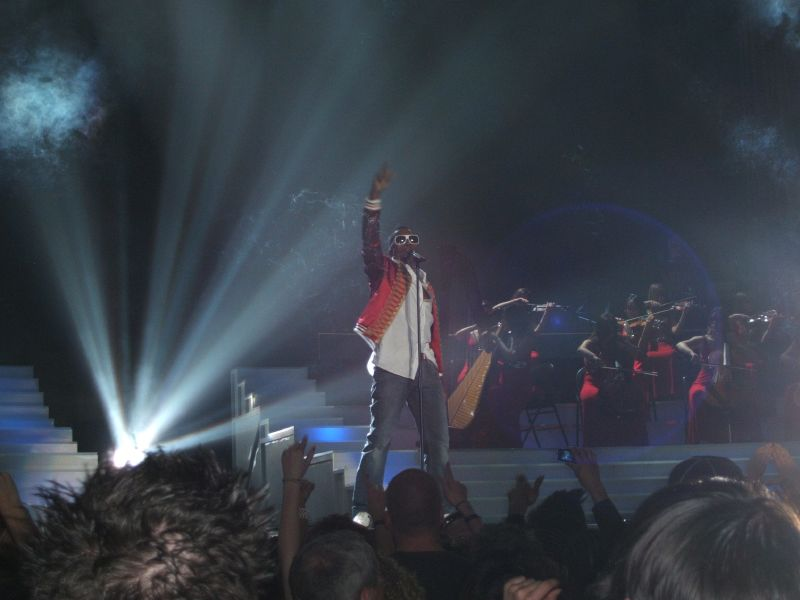
West performing the song at the 2006 Brit Awards

West performed the song live on the fourth episode of Wild 'n Out in 2005, while he also gave a performance at Abbey Road Studios in London on September 21, for his first live album Late Orchestration (2006). The rapper delivered a medley of the song, "Touch the Sky", and fellow Late Registration track "Gold Digger" at the 2006 Brit Awards, marking his first performance at the ceremony. While performing, he was supported by 77 dancers that were spray-painted gold. West performed "Diamonds from Sierra Leone" as the opener to his set at the 2006 Coachella Festival, where he wore a T-shirt in tribute to American trumpeter Miles Davis. On July 1, 2007, West performed the song at 8:56 p.m. as the last number of his set for part 3 of Princess Diana memorial event Concert for Diana at Wembley Stadium, London, a week before he delivered a performance of it for the Live Earth concert at Giants Stadium in East Rutherford, New Jersey. West quickly made his way to the stage at the Edinburgh Corn Exchange for T on the Fringe 2007 while the sample of "Diamonds Are Forever" on "Diamonds from Sierra Leone" played, before he performed the song. The performance saw him accompanied by a full-sized harp and a large group of tall violinists that wore golden ball gowns, and was reacted to positively by the crowd.

At Summer Jam 2008 on June 1, West started his appearance by performing "Diamonds from Sierra Leone". He was backed by explosive lights, pyrotechnics, and a multiple-piece band, though focused heavily on the music while hunched over. West performed a medley of hits that included the song and "Jesus Walks" (2004) at the 2009 Wireless Festival in Hyde Park, London, while rocking his customary aviator shades and black suit jacket. He performed on an elevated section of the stage, being surrounded by four topless dancers that wore tiaras and body paint. West provided a performance of the song at the 2011 Coachella Festival. West performed a shortened version of it as part of a medley of over 10 songs for 12-12-12: The Concert for Sandy Relief at Madison Square Garden in New York City on December 12, 2012, while rocking a Pyrex hoodie and leather kilt. He performed the song for his headlining appearance at the 2014 Bonnaroo Music Festival. The tempo for West's headlining set at the 2015 Glastonbury Festival went up from earlier during his performance of the song, which began from the set's 1:05:37 mark. The crowd cheered loudly in response to the performance, as well as yelling the lyrics back at West.

Fellow rapper Lupe Fiasco raps over the song's instrumental on "Conflict Diamonds", which was released on his second mixtape Fahrenheit 1/15 Part II: Revenge of the Nerds (2006). The song's lyrics feature Lupe Fiasco discussing the illegal diamond trade in Africa, mostly referencing the western area of the continent. For the song's conclusion, he raps: "Props to Kanye, I call it 'Conflict Diamonds'."

== Remix ==
"Diamonds from Sierra Leone (Remix)"

Song by Kanye West featuring Jay-Z

from the album Late Registration
- Released: August 30, 2005
- Recorded: 2004–05
- Length: 3:53
- Label: Roc-A-Fella; Def Jam
- Songwriters: Kanye West; Devo Harris; John Barry; Don Black
- Producers: Kanye West; Devon Springsteen; Jon Brion

On June 15, 2005, the remix of "Diamonds from Sierra Leone", featuring Jay-Z, impacted radio in the US, through Roc-A-Fella and Def Jam. It was later released for digital download in the country on July 5. On August 30, 2005, the remix was included as the thirteenth track on Late Registration, coming seven places before the original. Like the song, it contains a sample of Bassey's "Diamonds Are Forever". West's rapping is succeeded by Jay-Z's verse, which he delivers during the second part of the remix. Throughout the remix, the deaths of many civilians in blood diamond mines are referenced, as well as the tension between criticizing consumerism and being unable to resist it. West also alludes to the irony of wealthy African-Americans having bling as a result of Africans' suffering, alongside pleading with Uzbek-American jeweler Jacob the Jeweler to be told his diamonds were not a product of conflict. Jay-Z mostly discusses his ongoing feud with Dash, while he also pledges allegiance to his frequent collaborator Memphis Bleek after the rapper's albums had not sold well. He asserts that instead of a businessman, he is "a business, man..."

The remix was mostly well received by critics, often being praised for the subject matter. Rabin believed the "Jay-Z-blessed remix" evokes West's common theme of "the tension between criticizing consumerism and feeling powerless" to avoid the temptations. He detailed that West is like a preacher, having no issue showing everyone he's among "the biggest sinners in church" and seeing how "his self-deprecating, humanizing take on spirituality" shows why the rapper has been able to bring Jesus to "the hip-hop charts, and ride socially conscious rap to multiple platinum plaques". Browne preferred the remix to the original and noted the addition of rhymes about lives being lost in Sierra Leone's diamond mines, calling it "West's retort" to The College Dropout track "Breathe in Breathe Out" that focuses on jewelry. Blender's Jonah Weiner named the remix among the tracks on Late Registration to download, saying West broadcasts" his appalled discovery" of the diamond industry that includes "African warlords" and "the miners they mutilate". Weiner also chronicled that he asks a "24-carat question" and stated Jay-Z's "chuckling guest verse" oddly contrasts with West's "hand-wringing". Sean Fennessey of Pitchfork felt the remix provides "some admirable if dubious political grandstanding", though remembered "you gotta pay the cost to be the boss" when any large task is taken on. Azeem Ahmad from musicOMH saw it as both "excruciatingly haunting" and a masterpiece. In a negative review for Prefix Mag, Matthew Gasteier complained that West sounds as if he was given "a five-minute rundown on the issue" to prepare him for writing the remix.

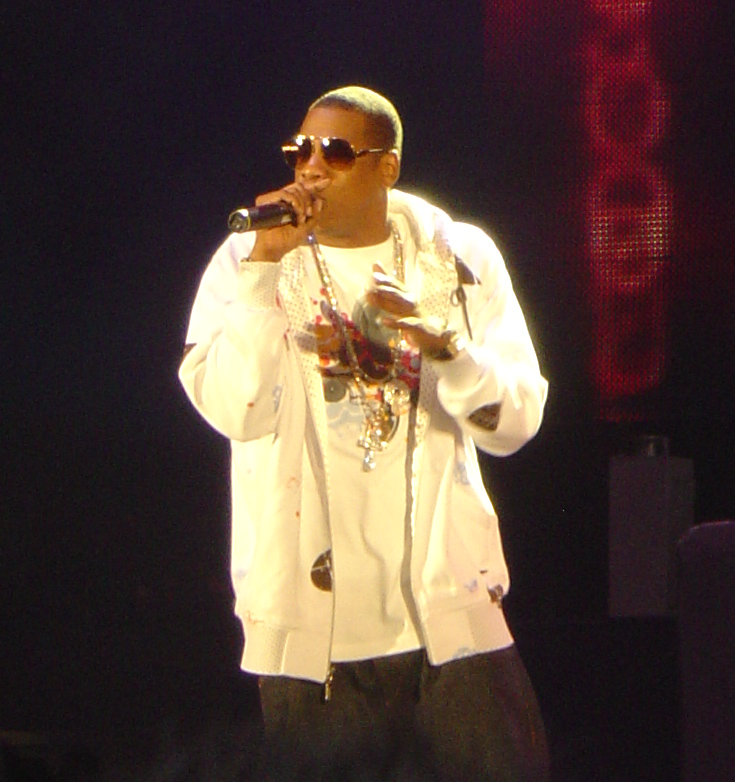
Numerous reviewers applauded Jay-Z's feature on the remix.

The Remix was positioned at number 16 on Dagsavisen's best songs list for 2005. It was ranked at number 55 on a list of 2005's greatest songs by Blender, with the staff writing that "a 007 sample" is deployed "to bitch-slap De Beers" and Jay-Z utilizes his best skill by rhyming about himself. On a list by Complex of the best songs from the magazine's 2002 formation to their decade anniversary in 2012, the remix was placed 87th. In 2015, The Guardian listed it as West's fourth best song. Billboard crowned the remix as West and Jay-Z's best collaboration in 2011, while Capital FM named it as their second best seven years later. At Summer Jam 2005, West brought out Jay-Z to perform the remix. Within West's 2007 track "Big Brother", he admits Jay-Z outperformed him on the remix: "I swore I spazzed/Then my big brother came through and kicked my ass." Memphis Bleek criticized Jay-Z's shoutout of him on it when speaking to This Is 50 in 2014, expressing a distaste for how "a stamp" was put on his career since people allegedly saw things "like [Jay] is just taking care of me and I'm just chilling and I'm not working".

== Track listings ==
US vinyl

1. "Diamonds from Sierra Leone" – Instrumental
2. "Diamonds from Sierra Leone" – A cappella

Australia CD single

1. "Diamonds from Sierra Leone" – Album Version (Explicit)
2. "Jesus Walks" – Remix (Explicit)
3. "The New Workout Plan" – Remix (Album Version, Explicit)

US digital download – Remix

1. "Diamonds from Sierra Leone" (Remix feat. Jay-Z) [feat. JAY-Z] – 3:34

== Credits and personnel ==
Information taken from Late Registration liner notes.

Recording

- Recorded at The Record Plant (Hollywood, CA) and Grandmaster Recording Studios (Hollywood, CA)
- Mixed at Larrabee North Studios (Los Angeles, CA)

Personnel

- Kanye West – songwriter, producer
- Devo Springsteen – songwriter, producer
- John Barry – songwriter
- Don Black – songwriter
- Jon Brion – producer
- Anthony Kilhoffer – recorder
- Tom Biller – recorder
- Manny Marroquin – mix engineer
- Richard Reitz – assistant engineer
- Jarred Robbins – assistant engineer
- Tom Craskey – keyboards
- Dave Tozer – guitars
- Michel Gondry – live drums

== Charts ==
=== Weekly charts ===
Weekly chart performance for "Diamonds from Sierra Leone"
Chart (2005)	Peak position
Australia (ARIA)	52
Australian Urban (ARIA)	19
Denmark (Tracklisten)	9
Finland (Suomen virallinen lista)	17
Germany (GfK)	67
Ireland (IRMA)	19
Netherlands (Dutch Top 40 Tipparade)	3
Netherlands (Single Top 100)	56
Norway (VG-lista)	16
Sweden (Sverigetopplistan)	30
Switzerland (Schweizer Hitparade)	52
UK Singles (Official Charts)	8
UK Hip Hop/R&B (Official Charts)	3
US Billboard Hot 100	43
US Hot R&B/Hip-Hop Songs (Billboard)	21
US Hot Rap Songs (Billboard)	11
US Rhythmic Airplay (Billboard)	24

=== Year-end charts ===
2005 year-end chart performance for "Diamonds from Sierra Leone"
Chart (2005)	Position
UK Singles (OCC)	98
US Hot R&B/Hip-Hop Songs (Billboard)	91

== Certifications ==
Certifications for "Diamonds from Sierra Leone"
Region	Certification	Certified units/sales
United Kingdom (BPI)	Silver	200,000^{‡}
United States (RIAA)	Platinum	1,000,000^{‡}
^{‡} Sales+streaming figures based on certification alone.

== Release history ==
Release dates and formats for "Diamonds from Sierra Leone"
Region	Date	Format	Version	Label(s)	Ref.
United States	May 2005	Mainstream radio	Original	Roc-A-Fella; Def Jam	
United States	June 21, 2005	Vinyl	Original	Roc-A-Fella; Def Jam	
United States	July 5, 2005	Digital download	Remix	Roc-A-Fella; Def Jam	
United Kingdom	July 14, 2005	Maxi CD	Original	Mercury	
Australia	August 1, 2005	CD	Original	Universal Australia	
United States	August 2, 2005	CD	Original	Universal	
