= On My Own (Consequence and Kid Cudi song) =

- Original cover

Song by Consequence featuring Kid Cudi
- Released: July 7, 2011
- Recorded: 2010–2011
- Genre: Hip-hop
- Length: 3:04
- Songwriters: Dexter Mills; Scott Mescudi
- Producer: Kanye West

"On My Own" is a song by American rapper Consequence featuring singer Kid Cudi. It is a hip-hop song produced by Kanye West, and several publications have interpreted its lyrics as containing criticism of him. Released on July 7, 2011, the track was premiered by Billboard and later appeared on Consequence’s mixtape, Curb Certified, as well as the 2024 re-issue of Movies on Demand.

== Background and promotion ==
The song was recorded over a year prior to its release, being previewed as a snippet. Exclaim! also reported that the song was recorded over a year before its release, before the public fallout between Consequence and West. During this period, it was slated for a release on Cons TV, a scrapped album conceived by Consequence. Hypebeast noted that the preview 'generated quite the buzz'.

=== Release ===
The song was released by Consequence on online platforms on July 7, 2011. The track's premiere was handled by American music outlet Billboard, which debuted the full track, also containing early coverage of its release. “On My Own” was later included on Consequence’s mixtape Curb Certified and subsequently appeared on the 2024 streaming re-release of his earlier mixtape Movies on Demand.

== Composition and lyrics ==
Centered on a Kanye West-produced beat, “On My Own” features eccentric hip-hop production. The melodic hook is performed by Kid Cudi, while the three verses are done by Consequence. Exclaim! described Consequence's lyrics as 'like Consequence is laying into Kanye.' PopCrush wrote that the song displays themes of frustration. Numerous sources interpreted these lyrics as directed at Kanye West. According to The Boombox, this came during a period of public tension between Consequence and Kanye West, which followed Consequence’s departure from West’s GOOD Music label.

== Critical reception ==
PopCrush described "On My Own" as a "kiss-off" to Kanye West and GOOD Music, highlighting the song’s critical lyrics and the irony of West's production. The review also praised Kid Cudi’s hook, which reinforces Consequence’s lyrics. Music journalism website blahblahblahscience gave the song a positive review, crediting its laid-back style. Exclaim! credited the song's production, noting it as a 'well-produced track with an interesting hook and beat.'
