= The Corner (song) =

2005 single by Common

Single by Common featuring Kanye West and the Last Poets

from the album Be
- Released: March 1, 2005
- Recorded: Sony Music Studios, New York, NY
- Genre: Hip-hop
- Length: 3:45
- Label: GOOD Music, Geffen
- Songwriters: Lonnie Lynn; Kanye West; Abiodun Oyewole; Umar Bin Hassan; Leon Moore
- Producer: Kanye West

Common singles chronology
"The Food" (2004)	"The Corner" (2005)	"Go!" (2005)

Kanye West singles chronology
"Down and Out" (2005)	"The Corner" (2005)	"Diamonds from Sierra Leone" (2005)

The Last Poets singles chronology
"Panthers" (2002)	"The Corner" (2005)

"The Corner" is the second single released by rapper Common on his sixth album, Be. It features a chorus and production by Kanye West as well as spoken word lyrics by the Last Poets. The song's lyrics deal with street corners in poor neighborhoods. The song's beat contains samples from "You Make the Sun Shine" by The Temprees and "What It Is" by The Temptations. Because of the song's gritty sound, some fans considered it to be a return to Common's Resurrection days. A music video directed by Kanye West was made for "The Corner."

== Acclaim ==
"The Corner" attained some commercial success reaching #42 on the Hot R&B/Hip-Hop Singles & Tracks chart, but was even more popular among critics. Amongst other accolades, it was nominated as the Best Rap Performance by a Duo or Group at the 48th Grammy Awards. Spence D. of IGN.com explains the basis for its success writing:

"The Corner" [...] is the defacto bomb on the album. West's groove is sick and witty, piano and bass meshing together in a smoothly lumbering lope with a nice accentuated vocal sample on the chorus. The addition of the legendary Last Poets only elevates the tune to the next level. One of the best burners of the year, hands down.

In addition, Nathan Brackett of Rolling Stone states that it is one of the "hardest-rocking tracks of Common's career." Pitchfork's Tom Breihan considers the beat to be "dusty and heavenly." Steve Juon of RapReviews.com claims Common's lyrics to contain profound observations of urban life that show why hip-hop is the "black man's CNN." Common understands that critics consider "The Corner" to be a return from his Electric Circus style. As he says on "They Say" from his 2005 album Be: "They say the crochet pants and the sweater was wack/Seen 'The Corner', now they say that nigga's back."

=== Remixes ===
- The official remix featuring Kanye West, the Last Poets, Scarface, Mos Def and a new verse by Common can be found on Scarface's 2005 album My Homies Part 2. It was also released by Common as a single.
- This song was covered with heavily revised lyrics by Clipse on their We Got It 4 Cheap: Vol. 2 mixtape.
- An alternate version, using the same backing track as Common's version, was included on some versions of De La Soul's 2006 album The Impossible: Mission TV Series – Pt. 1, a collection of rare and previously unreleased material.

== Track listing ==
=== A-side ===
1. "The Corner" (Radio) (3:46)
2. "The Corner" (Instrumental) (3:46)
3. "The Corner" (Radio A Capella) (3:34)

=== B-side ===
1. "The Corner" (LP) (3:46)
2. "The Corner" (LP A Capella) (3:46)
3. "The Corner" (Last Poet Reprise) (3:46)

== Charts ==
Chart performance for "The Corner"
Chart (2005)	Peak position
US Bubbling Under Hot 100 (Billboard)	10
US Hot R&B/Hip-Hop Songs (Billboard)	42

== See also ==
- List of Common songs
