= Testify (Common song) =

Song by Common

Single by Common

from the album Be
- Released: September 27, 2005
- Recorded: Sony Music Studios, New York, NY & Encore Studio, Burbank, CA
- Genre: Conscious hip-hop
- Length: 2:36
- Label: GOOD; Geffen
- Songwriters: Lonnie Lynn; Kanye West; General Johnson; Angelo Bond; Gregory Perry
- Producer: Kanye West

Common singles chronology
"Go!" (2005)	"Testify" (2005)	"Faithful" (2005)

"Testify" is the fourth single from rapper Common's 2005 album Be. Clocking in at just above two and a half minutes, it is the second shortest track on Be (after the album's intro). It is produced by Kanye West, whose beat heavily utilizes vocal samples from "Innocent Til Proven Guilty" by Honey Cone. Spence D. of IGN.com comments on this saying: "'Testify' [...] features an intricate layering of vocals which provide such an hypnotic backdrop that you almost forget to listen to Common's compelling storytelling." The song's story is about a woman who manipulates a judge and jury to find her partner guilty of a crime she committed. After the case is settled, she starts laughing that she is the criminal. Sean Malcolm of AllHipHop.com considers Common to have "paint[ed] pictures of extravagant court trials" on "Testify." The song was a critical hit garnering a nomination for Best Rap Solo Performance at the 48th Grammy Awards.

A remix featuring soul singer Darien Brockington and a different beat was recorded.

== Music video ==
The single received a type of promotional video known as a "mini-movie"; a term coined by Michael Jackson to describe a music video with a complex plot and a suitably long running time, often with intermissions between the song's parts. The video features acting parts from Taraji P. Henson, Bill Duke, Steve Harris and Wood Harris and is directed by Anthony Mandler. It was played mostly on specialist channels such as MTV2. It was nominated as the Video of the Year at the 2006 BET Hip Hop Awards.

A shorter video featuring only the musical parts of the mini-movie was also released. The finale of the music video is heavily influenced by the ending of The Usual Suspects.

== Track listing ==
=== A-side ===
1. "Testify (radio edit)" (2:50)
2. "Testify (instrumental)" (2:50)

=== B-side ===
1. "Testify (LP)" (2:50)
2. "Testify (instrumental)" (2:50)

== Personnel ==
- Produced by Kanye West
- Recorded by Andrew Dawson at Sony Studios and Encore Studios, Burbank
- Assistant Recording Engineers: Taylor Dow and Ric McRae
- Mixed by Manny Marroquin at Larrabee North Studio, North Hollywood
- Assistant Mix Engineer: Jared Robbins

== Chart positions ==
Chart (2005)	Peak position
U.S. Billboard Bubbling Under Hot 100 Singles	9
U.S. Billboard Hot R&B/Hip-Hop Songs	44

== See also ==
- List of Common songs
