= Be (Common album) =

Studio album by Common
- Released: May 24, 2005
- Studios: Encore (Burbank); Pay Jay (Clinton Township); Sony Music (New York)
- Genres: Hip-hop; conscious hip-hop; hip-hop soul; progressive rap; chipmunk soul
- Length: 42:33
- Labels: GOOD; Geffen
- Producers: Kanye West (also exec.); J Dilla; James Poyser; Karriem Riggins

Common chronology
Electric Circus (2002)	Be (2005)	Finding Forever (2007)

Singles from Be
- 1. "The Food" Released: October 8, 2004; 2. "The Corner" Released: March 1, 2005; 3. "Go!" Released: June 14, 2005; 4. "Testify" Released: September 27, 2005; 5. "Faithful" Released: October 8, 2005

Be is the sixth studio album by American rapper Common. It was released on May 24, 2005, by Geffen Records and GOOD Music. The album is Common's first album under Geffen, following the mediocre performance of 2002's Electric Circus and the July 2003 merger of preceding label MCA Records, which, like Geffen and its sister label Interscope Records, was a division of Universal Music Group.

The album was primarily and executively produced by rapper and GOOD Music founder Kanye West, with additional production from frequent collaborator J Dilla. It debuted at number two on the US Billboard 200, with first-week sales of 185,000 copies in the United States. In 2025, the album was certified Platinum by the Recording Industry Association of America (RIAA).

Be was also a critical success, receiving acclaim and accolades from several critics and music publications. The album received a perfect "XXL" rating from hip-hop publication XXL and was deemed Common's magnum opus by HipHopGoldenAge. In 2022 and 2024, Rolling Stone and Billboard included Be on their lists of the greatest hip-hop albums of all time.

== Conception ==
=== Background ===
Be was touted as Common's comeback album after the commercially disastrous Electric Circus (2002); the predecessor lacked promotion following MCA Records' absorption into Geffen, which was completed in July 2003. His new alliance with Kanye West helped to spark public interest in the project, as the album was produced by West and released by his own label GOOD Music. "I met Kanye in '96…" he said. "He was still in high school. He used to come around No I.D.'s house, a guy that used to produce for me. The thing I noticed about Kanye was that he could really rap! He had some kind of hunger that I hadn't really seen before."

"He's today's Marvin Gaye of rap," West enthused on a DVD accompanying a deluxe edition of Be. "Buy the album. If you in a situation where you can barely buy groceries, burn the album."

The results show that Common was clearly aware, and perhaps agreeing, with the negative criticisms about Electric Circus. In comparison to that album, Be is lean, immediate, and commanding, yet also restrained in its musical ambitions. Of the reaction to the album, the rapper said: "I don't think [Electric Circus] was as focused. Though I'd done some progressive hip-hop, people know me as the b-boy. When I showed them something different, a different style of b-boy, there were like, "Hold up. You can be Afrocentric, but what's this rock shit that you're doing?" Many of the beats created by West, and which Common rejected for the project, later appeared on West's studio album Late Registration.

=== Title ===
In an interview with AllHipHop, Common denied that the album title stood for "Before Erykah." Common explained the concept and the album title in a 2005 interview for SixShot.com:

I named it Be to be who you are, man, and be able to be in the moment and not try too hard. Be is another way of saying just do without trying hard, like I said, natural and be true to the core of who you are; and this album, I wanted to just be and not just go and exist as just an artist, not worried about the past.

== Singles ==
=== "The Corner" ===
Common gave his reasons for featuring controversial spoken word recording artists, the Last Poets, on the album's first official single, "The Corner": "They gifted at writing. They voices is incredible. They took my song to a higher level. And that's what hip-hop was about to me. It would have a message. It would take you to the next place. It was fresh as people say -- something new. They brought newness to what "The Corner" was and they also brought some nostalgia, too. Just them being from the '70s and being used in hip-hop and their spirit brought something pure to it. They gave me a better understanding of the corner after that. I knew those who had been listening to hip-hop would know who the Last Poets were and if they didn't they would feel it in their souls sooner or later. And I also felt good about introducing some of the youth to the Last Poets."

=== "Go!" ===
"Go" was the album's third, and highest-charting single. The song featured Kanye West and John Mayer, however all the verses are performed by Common with West and Mayer ad-libbing in the chorus. The video for the song included shots of Common surrounded by numerous models.

=== "Testify" ===
The album's fourth single, "Testify" received a type of promotional video known as a "mini-movie"; a term coined by Michael Jackson to describe a music video with a complex plot and a suitably long running time, often with intermissions between the song's parts. The video featured acting parts from Taraji P. Henson, Bill Duke, Steve Harris and Wood Harris, and received notable spins on specialist channels such as MTV2. The song samples "Innocent Til Proven Guilty" by Honey Cone.

== Critical reception ==
Professional ratings
Aggregate scores
Source	Rating
Metacritic	83/100
Review scores
Source	Rating
AllMusic	4/5 stars
Blender	4/5 stars
Entertainment Weekly	A−
The Guardian	4/5 stars
NME	8/10
Pitchfork	8.6/10
Q	4/5 stars
Rolling Stone	4/5 stars
Spin	A−
Vibe	4.5/5 stars

Be received widespread acclaim from critics. At Metacritic, which assigns a normalized rating out of 100 to reviews from mainstream publications, the album received an average score of 83, based on 26 reviews. Andy Kellman of AllMusic said, "Be isn't likely to be referred to by anyone as groundbreaking, but it's one of Common's best, and it's also one of the most tightly constructed albums of any form within recent memory." Andy Greenwald of Blender said, "Be picks up where West's The College Dropout left off." Raymond Fiore of Entertainment Weekly said, "Be's leanness signals awesome growth even without pushing sonic boundaries." Dorian Lynskey of The Guardian said, "Though not quite 2005's best hip-hop album – Kanye West retains that honour for himself – Be is a lean and vibrant masterclass in hip-hop fundamentals." NME said, "Gives hope to a hip-hop stuck in a mire of mediocrity."

Ryan Dombal of Pitchfork said, "The lack of instant-gratification couplets may disappoint at first, but each verse's rewarding intricacies become more evident with multiple listens." Q said, "Common's best album so far, one that proves hip hop can be both smart and mainstream." Nathan Brackett of Rolling Stone said, "West is the producer Common has been waiting for all of his career: He makes Common both catchier and edgier at the same time." Will Hermes of Spin said, "Even when the music flags, Common's remarkably hungry raps push it along." XXL gave the album its highest rating of XXL, writing, "While label support and the times heavily influence whether great music can be crowned a classic, if nothing else Common has created a flawless album. By giving us himself completely and speaking to and for us as complete people, he's birthed the total package. Common has raised the bar. Hopefully, a year from now we'll look back and see that MCs have been rhyming like Common since.

Andrew Simon of Vibe wrote that the album "gets to the root of human experience—all the while staying beautifully soulful and funky." The New York Times' Kelefa Sanneh felt that Be was "certainly a triumph, but if it isn't quite the all-time classic Common was hoping for, that's because it sounds a bit too straightforward." Assigning the album a three-star honorable mention rating, Robert Christgau of The Village Voice wrote that "few of the best moments belong to the main attraction, who's not as wise as they tell him he is."

Common's lyrics on Be earned him the Lyricist of the Year award at the 2006 BET Hip Hop Awards. In 2012 Complex called the album one of the classics of the last decade. The album was also included in the book 1001 Albums You Must Hear Before You Die.

=== Accolades ===
Publication	Country	Accolade	Year	Rank
Aftenposten	Norway	Albums of the Year	2005	18
AllMusic	USA	Albums of the Year	2005	*
B92	Serbia	Albums of the Year	2005	7
Billboard	USA	Critics' & Artist' Choice	2005	4
Dagbladet	Norway	Albums of the Year	2005	13
Dagsavisen	Norway	Albums of the Year	2005	18
E! Online	USA	Albums of the Year	2005	17
Expressen	Sweden	Albums of the Year	2005	17
Go-Mag	Spain	Albums of the Year	2005	17
H Magazine	Spain	Albums of the Year	2005	*
Harp	USA	Albums of the Year	2005	33
Hip Hop Connection	UK	The 100 Greatest Rap Albums 1995–2005	2006	69
Iguana	Spain	Albums of the Year	2005	3
Laut.de	Germany	Albums of the Year	2005	42
Monitor	Croatia	Albums of the Year	2005	34
Musik-Express/Sounds	Germany	Albums of the Year	2005	36
Musikbyrån	Sweden	Albums of the Year	2005	12
Natt & Dagg	Norway	Albums of the Year	2005	14
The Observer	UK	Albums of the Year	2005	25
OOR	Netherlands	Albums of the Year	2005	12
People	USA	10 Discs We Love	2005	*
Piccadilly Records	UK	Albums of the Year	2005	4
PopMatters	USA	Albums of the Year	2005	12
Prefix Magazine	USA	Albums of the Year	2005	19
Pure Pop	Mexico	Albums of the Year	2005	5
Q	USA	Albums of the Year	2005	42
Rock de Lux	Spain	Albums of the Year	2005	9
Rolling Stone	USA	Albums of the Year	2005	21
Spex	Germany	Albums of the Year	2005	12
Spin	USA	Albums of the Year	2005	17
URB	USA	Albums of the Year	2005	*
The Village Voice	USA	Albums of the Year	2005	15
Vibe	USA	Albums of the Year	2005	*
WOXY.com	USA	Albums of the Year	2005	58
Zundfunk	Germany	Albums of the Year	2005	22

==== Grammy nominations ====
Be was nominated in four categories at the 48th Grammy Awards: Best Rap Album, Best Rap Performance by a Duo or Group for "The Corner" featuring the Last Poets, Best Rap/Sung Collaboration for "They Say" featuring Kanye West and John Legend, and Best Rap Solo Performance for "Testify".

== 20th Anniversary Edition ==
In celebration of the album's 20th anniversary, a deluxe edition of Be was released on May 23, 2025 by Geffen Records. The expanded release includes the original 11 tracks, along with remixes, previously unreleased material, and instrumental versions of each song. It was released in both digital and vinyl formats.

The 28-track digital version features new versions such as:

- "The Corner (Remix)" featuring Kanye West, The Last Poets, Scarface, and Yasiin Bey
- "GO! (Jazzanova Remix)" featuring Joy Denalane
- "The Food" (studio version)
- Instrumental versions of all original album tracks

The vinyl edition marked the first time the full album and its instrumentals were bundled together in a special package.

== Track listing ==
All tracks produced by Kanye West, except for "Love Is..." and "It's Your World (Part 1 & 2)", produced by J Dilla; the latter is additionally produced by James Poyser and Karriem Riggins.

Standard edition
No.	Title	Writer(s)	Length
1.	"Be (Intro)"	Lonnie Lynn; Kanye West; Albert Jones	2:24
2.	"The Corner" (featuring Umar Bin Hassan of the Last Poets)	Lynn; West; Abiodun Oyewole; Umar Bin Hassan; Leon Moore	3:45
3.	"Go!" (featuring John Mayer and Kanye West)	Lynn; West; John Mayer; Linda Lewis	3:44
4.	"Faithful"	Lynn; West; DeWayne Julius Rogers	3:33
5.	"Testify"	Lynn; West; Angelo Bond; General Johnson; Gregory Perry	2:36
6.	"Love Is…"	Lynn; James Dewitt Yancey; Anna Gaye; Marvin Gaye; James Nyx; Elgie Stover	4:10
7.	"Chi-City"	Lynn; West; Eddie Cornelius	3:27
8.	"The Food" (live)	Lynn; West; Sam Cooke; Stanley McKenney; Eugene Record	3:36
9.	"Real People"	Lynn; West; Caesar Frazier	2:48
10.	"They Say" (featuring Kanye West and John Legend)	Lynn; West; John Stephens; Thomas Bell; Linda Epstein	3:57
11.	"It's Your World (Part 1 & 2)" (featuring "the Kids")	Lynn; Yancey; James Poyser; Karriem Riggins; Lonnie "Pops" Lynn; Robert Curington; Willie Lestor	8:33
Total length:			42:33

20th anniversary edition
No.	Title	Writer(s)	Producer(s)	Length
12.	"The Corner (Remix)" (featuring Mos Def and Scarface)	Lynn; Dante Terrell Smith; Brad Terrence Jordan; West; Oyewole; Hassan; Moore	Kanye West	4:14
13.	"The Corner (Last Poet Reprise)" (featuring The Last Poets)	Lynn; West; Oyuwole; Hassan; Moore	Kanye West	3:47
14.	"Go! (Jazzanova remix)" (featuring Joy Denalane)	Lynn; Joy Maureen Denalane; West; Mayer; Maximilian Herre; Lewis	Jazzanova; Kanye West	3:46
15.	"The Food"	Lynn; West; Cooke; McKenney; Record	Kanye West	4:19
16.	"The Movement"	Lynn; Yancey	J Dilla	4:24
17.	"Be (Intro)" (Instrumental)		Kanye West	2:26
18.	"The Corner" (Instrumental)		Kanye West	3:47
19.	"Go!" (Instrumental)		Kanye West	3:46
20.	"Faithful" (Instrumental)		Kanye West	3:35
21.	"Testify" (Instrumental)		Kanye West	2:39
22.	"Love Is…" (Instrumental)		J Dilla	4:12
23.	"Chi-City" (Instrumental)		Kanye West	3:29
24.	"The Food" (Instrumental)		Kanye West	3:39
25.	"Real People" (Instrumental)		Kanye West	2:50
26.	"They Say" (Instrumental)		Kanye West	4:04
27.	"It's Your World (Part 1 & 2)" (Instrumental)		J Dilla; James Poyser; Karriem Riggins	8:34
Total length:				106:05

Notes

- ^{^[a]} signifies a co-producer.
- "The Corner", "Chi-City" and "The Food" feature background vocals by Kanye West
- "Faithful" features background vocals by John Legend and Bilal
- "Love Is..." features background vocals by Luna E of Cirius B
- "It's Your World (Part 1 & 2)" features background vocals by Bilal and Mr. Lonnie Lynn

Sample credits

- "Be (Intro)" contains a sample of "Mother Nature", written by Albert Jones.
- "The Corner" contains samples of "You Make the Sun Shine", written by Leon Moore and performed by the Temprees.
- "Go!" contains a sample of "Old Smokey", performed by Linda Lewis.
- "Faithful" contains a sample of "Faithful to the End", performed by D. J. Rogers.
- "Testify" contains a sample of "Innocent Till Proven Guilty", performed by Honey Cone.
- "Love Is..." contains a sample of "God Is Love", performed by Marvin Gaye.
- "Chi-City" contains an interpolation of "Since I Found My Baby", performed by Cornelius Brothers & Sister Rose.
- "The Food" contains samples of "I Never Had It So Good and Felt So Bad", performed by the Chi-Lites; and "Nothing Can Change This Love", performed by Sam Cooke.
- "Real People" contains a sample of "Sweet Children", written by Caesar Frazier.
- "They Say" contains samples of "Ghetto Child", performed by Ahmad Jamal.
- "It's Your World (Part 1 & 2)" contains a sample of "Share What You Got", performed by the Modulations.

== Personnel ==
Credits for Be adapted from AllMusic.

- A-Trak – main personnel, scratching, turntables
- Jason Agel – assistant engineer
- Num Amun-Tehu – main personnel, percussion
- Bilal – guest artist, main personnel, vocals (background)
- Cass Bird – cover photo
- Dave Chappelle – introduction
- Common – executive producer, main personnel, primary artist, rap
- Tom Coyne – mastering
- Darren "ROCK" Darnell – engineer
- Andrew Dawson – engineer, mixing
- J Dilla – audio production
- DJ Dummy – main personnel, scratching, turntables
- Taylor Dow – assistant engineer
- Derrick Dudley – executive producer
- Luna E – main personnel, vocals (background)
- Francis Forde – assistant engineer
- Dawn Haynes – wardrobe
- Frank Hendler – mixing assistant
- Derrick Hodge – bass (acoustic), double bass, main personnel
- Charles Hunt – engineer
- Kids – performer, primary artist
- Anthony Kilhoffer – engineer
- Christian Lantry – photography
- The Last Poets – guest artist, main personnel, primary artist, spoken word
- John Legend – guest artist, main personnel, primary artist, vocals (background)
- Lonnie Lynn – main personnel, poetry, vocals (background)
- Mister Lonnie & the Kids Lynn – vocals (background)
- Manny Marroquin – mixing
- Hulis Mavruk – art direction
- John Mayer – guest artist, main personnel, vocals (background)
- Rick McRae – assistant engineer
- Bob Power – mixing
- James Poyser – audio production, instrumentation, keyboards, main personnel, strings, various instruments
- Karriem Riggins – drums, percussion, producer
- Jared Robbins – mixing assistant
- Steve Tolle – assistant engineer
- Kanye West – audio production, executive producer, guest artist, keyboards, main personnel, primary artist, producer, vocals (background)
- Jared Zastrow – engineer

== Charts ==
=== Weekly charts ===
Chart (2005)	Peak position
Canadian Albums (Billboard)	10
UK Albums (Official Charts)	38
UK R&B Albums (Official Charts)	25
US Billboard 200	2
US Top R&B/Hip-Hop Albums (Billboard)	1
US Top Rap Albums (Billboard)	1

=== Year-end charts ===
Chart (2005)	Position
US Billboard 200	90
US Top R&B/Hip-Hop Albums (Billboard)	25

== Certifications ==
Region	Certification	Certified units/sales
United Kingdom (BPI)	Silver	60,000^{^}
United States (RIAA)	Platinum	1,000,000^{‡}
^{^} Shipments figures based on certification alone.^{‡} Sales+streaming figures based on certification alone.
