= Go! (Common song) =

Single by Common featuring John Mayer and Kanye West

from the album Be
- Released: June 14, 2005
- Recorded: 2004
- Studio: Sony Music Studios (New York); Encore Studio (Burbank, CA)
- Genre: Hip-hop
- Length: 3:44
- Label: GOOD; Geffen
- Songwriters: Lonnie Lynn; Kanye West; John Mayer; Linda Lewis
- Producer: Kanye West

Common singles chronology
| "The Corner" (2005) | "Go!" (2005) | "Testify" (2005) |

John Mayer singles chronology
| "Daughters" (2004) | "Go!" (2005) | "Waiting on the World to Change" (2006) |

Kanye West singles chronology
| "Diamonds from Sierra Leone" (2005) | "Go!" (2005) | "Gold Digger" (2005) |

"Go!" is the third single from the Common album Be. It is produced by Kanye West, who also performs backing vocals for the track alongside John Mayer. The track's percussion is handled by Num Amuntehu, while its scratches are provided by A-Trak. Its beat contains a sample from "Old Smokey" by Linda Lewis. Its lyrics deal with sexual fantasies.

Two remixes of "Go!" featuring Joy Denalane were released as singles: one was remixed by Kanye West and the other by Jazzanova. J. Cole also raps over the "Go!" beat on "Knock On Wood Freestyle" on his The Blow Up mixtape.

== Background ==
Common, Kanye West and John Mayer were inspired to create a song after seeing the 2004 movie Ray. They all headed to a studio where Kanye worked on a beat and Mayer told Common to write about fantasies. Despite Common's initial hesitance of being influenced by a non hip-hop artist, he wrote the song and it was later recorded in two studios: Sony Music Studios in New York City and Encore Studios in Burbank, California.

== Commercial performance ==
It was the most commercially successful song on Be as it reached #79 on The Billboard Hot 100 and also reached the Hot R&B/Hip-Hop Singles & Tracks and Hot Rap Tracks charts. Critics attribute this success to its mellow beat, smooth vocals and subject matter. Spence D. of IGN.com writes:

"Go!" is the requisite mid-tempo love jammy with pun[c]hes of "Go" lightly echoed throughout while Kanye tosses in the hype man "and on the count of three, go, go, go, uhhh!" To his credit Common rides the rhythm with a natural ease and earns points for making a slow rap jam that isn't one of those out-dated cross pollination numbers featuring the flavor of the day female crooner.

== Music video ==
A music video directed by Kanye West, MK12 and Convert was produced. It features Common relaxing in a modern house that contains rugs, couches and a large window allowing much light into the house. Common's surroundings are constantly morphing, but maintain a brown and beige color scheme. As a preface to various scenes in which Common fulfills fantasies with women, phrases such as "body of a dancer" and "free love" appear. The end of the video features a snippet of "Faithful", the succeeding track in Be after "Go!". Entertainment Weekly named it the fourth best music video of 2005.

== Track listing ==
=== "Go"/"Chi-City" ===
==== A-side ====
1. "Go (LP Version)" (3:44)
2. "Go (instrumental)" (3:44)
3. "Go (radio edit)" (3:44)
4. "Go (Acapella)" (3:44)

==== B-side ====
1. "Chi-City (LP Version)" (3:27)
2. "Chi-City (instrumental)" (3:27)
3. "Chi-City (radio edit)" (3:27)
4. "Chi-City (Acapella)" (3:27)

=== "Go! (Jazzanova Remix)" ===
==== A-side ====
1. "Go! (Jazzanova Remix Main)" (4:08)
2. "Go! (Jazzanova Remix Clean)" (4:07)

==== B-side ====
1. "Go! (Original Remix)" (3:43)
2. "Go! (Jazzanova Remix Instrumental)" (4:07)

=== "Go! (Remix)"/"The Corner (Remix)" ===
==== A-side ====
1. "Go! (remix)" (3:47)
2. "Go! (Original Version)" (3:45)

==== B-side ====
1. "Go! (instrumental)" (3:44)
2. "The Corner (remix)" (4:10)

== Personnel ==
- Produced by Kanye West
- Recorded by Andrew Dawson at Sony Studios and Encore Studios, Burbank
- Assistant Recording Engineers: Taylor Dow, Ric McRae and Francis Forde
- Mixed by Manny Marroquin at Larrabee North Studio, North Hollywood
- Assistant Mix Engineer: Jared Robbins
- Background Vocals by John Mayer and Kanye West
- Percussions by Num Amuntehu
- Scratches by A-Trak

== Charts ==
Chart performance for "Go!"
| Chart (2005) | Peak position |
|---|---|
| US Billboard Hot 100 | 79 |
| US Hot R&B/Hip-Hop Songs (Billboard) | 31 |
| US Hot Rap Songs (Billboard) | 21 |

== See also ==
- List of Common songs
