= John Legend discography =

Recordings by American singer

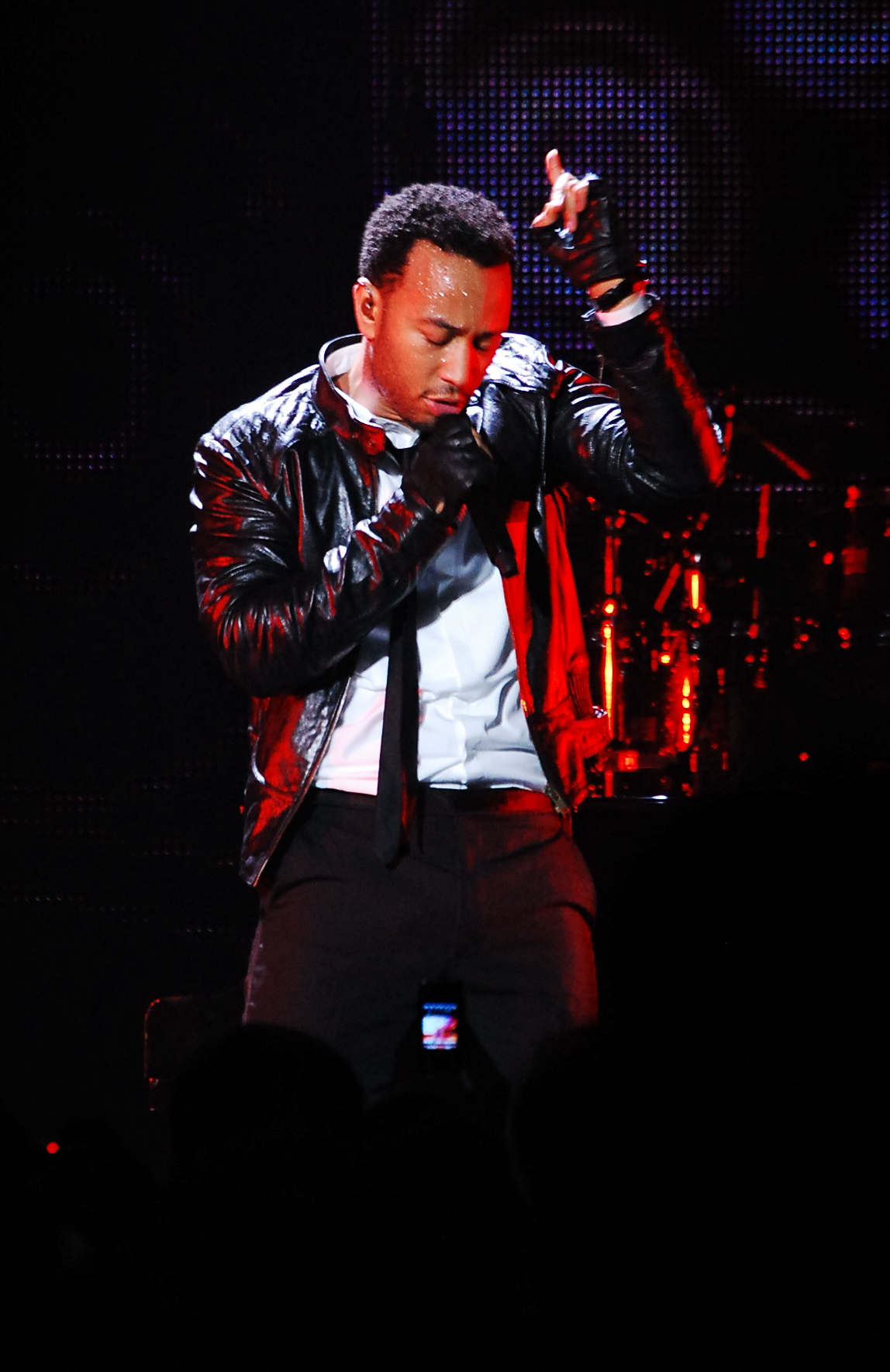
- Legend performing in 2008
- Studio albums: 11
- Extended plays: 3
- Live albums: 6
- Singles: 56
- Video albums: 2
- Promotional singles: 2

The discography of American singer John Legend consists of eleven full-length studio albums, six live albums, two video albums, three extended plays, 56 singles and two promotional singles.

Prior to the release of Legend's debut album, his career gained momentum through his collaborations with multiple artists; these include Slum Village's "Selfish", Dilated Peoples' "This Way", Jay-Z's "Encore", Alicia Keys' "You Don't Know My Name", the Kanye West remix of Britney Spears' "Me Against the Music", and Fort Minor's "High Road". Additionally, he played piano on Lauryn Hill's "Everything Is Everything". He peaked the Billboard Hot 100 with his 2013 single "All of Me". He has sold over 10 million albums in the United States.

== Albums ==
=== Studio albums ===
List of studio albums, with selected chart positions, sales figures and certifications
Title	Album details	Peak chart positions										Sales	Certifications
Title	Album details	US	US R&B /HH	AUS	CAN	DEN	FRA	ITA	NLD	SWI	UK	Sales	Certifications
Get Lifted	Released: December 28, 2004 (US); Label: GOOD, Columbia; Formats: CD, LP, digital download	4	1	36	56	33	53	49	5	65	12	US: 2,100,000; World: 4,000,000	RIAA: 2× Platinum; ARIA: Gold; BPI: Platinum; MC: Gold; NVPI: Gold
Once Again	Released: October 24, 2006 (US); Label: GOOD, Columbia; Formats: CD, LP, digital download	3	1	56	11	21	58	5	2	12	10	World: 2,500,000	RIAA: Platinum; BPI: Gold; MC: Gold; NVPI: Platinum
Evolver	Released: October 28, 2008 (US); Label: GOOD, Columbia; Formats: CD, LP, digital download	4	1	66	14	—	72	19	7	36	21	US: 603,000	RIAA: Platinum; BPI: Silver; NVPI: Gold
Wake Up! (with The Roots)	Released: September 21, 2010 (US); Label: GOOD, Columbia; Formats: CD, LP, digital download	8	3	42	16	38	95	27	6	15	26	US: 273,000	
Love in the Future	Released: September 3, 2013 (US); Label: GOOD, Columbia; Formats: CD, LP, digital download	4	2	15	10	12	67	13	3	16	2	US: 789,000; UK: 373,860	RIAA: 2× Platinum; ARIA: Platinum; BPI: Platinum; IFPI DEN: Platinum; MC: Gold
Darkness and Light	Released: December 2, 2016 (US); Label: GOOD, Columbia; Formats: CD, LP, digital download, streaming	14	5	37	29	—	123	49	21	32	35	US: 26,000	MC: Gold
A Legendary Christmas	Released: October 26, 2018; Label: Columbia; Formats: CD, LP, digital download, streaming	22	8	39	44	—	—	77	23	—	—	US: 19,000	RIAA: Gold
Bigger Love	Released: June 19, 2020; Label: Columbia; Formats: CD, LP, digital download, streaming	19	13	52	45	—	179	—	42	30	63		
Legend	Released: September 9, 2022; Label: Republic; Formats: CD, LP, digital download, streaming	59	32	—	—	—	185	—	—	39	—		
My Favorite Dream	Released: August 30, 2024; Label: Republic; Formats: CD, LP, digital download, streaming	—	—	—	—	—	—	—	—	—	—		
Muse	Released: October 23, 2026; Label: Republic; Formats: CD, LP, digital download, streaming	36	11	—	—	—	—	—	—	—	—		
"—" denotes releases that did not chart or were not released in that territory.

=== Live albums ===
List of live albums, with selected chart positions
Title	Album details	Peak chart positions			
Title	Album details	US	US R&B	FRA	NLD
Live at Jimmy's Uptown	Released: 2001 (US); Formats: CD	—	—	—	—
Live at SOB's	Released: June 10, 2003 (US); Label: DCN; Formats: CD	—	—	—	—
Solo Sessions Vol. 1: Live at the Knitting Factory	Released: 2004 (US); Label: Knitting Factory; Formats: CD	—	—	—	—
John Legend: Live from Philadelphia	Released: June 3, 2008 (US); Label: GOOD, Columbia; Formats: CD, digital download	7	4	187	44
iTunes Festival: London 2013	Released: September 2, 2014; Label: GOOD, Columbia; Formats: digital download	—	—	—	—
Verzuz: Alicia Keys x John Legend (with Alicia Keys)	Released: June 19, 2020; Formats: digital download	—	—	—	—
"—" denotes releases that did not chart or were not released in that territory.

=== Video albums ===
List of video albums
Title	Album details	Certifications
John Legend: Live at the House of Blues	Released: November 22, 2005 (US); Label: Sony; Formats: Blu-ray, DVD	
John Legend: Live from Philadelphia	Released: April 8, 2008 (US); Label: Sony; Formats: Blu-ray, DVD	RIAA: Gold

== Extended plays ==
List of extended plays
Title	EP details
Connect Sets	Released: 2005 (US); Label: Columbia; Formats: CD
Sounds of the Season	Released: October 2006 (US); Label: GOOD, Sony; Formats: CD
iTunes Live from SoHo (with The Roots)	Released: January 28, 2011 (US); Label: GOOD; Formats: Digital download

== Singles ==
=== As lead artist ===
List of singles as lead artist, with selected chart positions and certifications, showing year released and album name
Title	Year	Peak chart positions										Certifications	Album
Title	Year	US	US R&B/HH	US Dance	US Jazz	AUS	CAN	ITA	NLD	SWI	UK	Certifications	Album
"Used to Love U"	2004	74	32	—	—	67	—	36	42	—	29		Get Lifted
"Ordinary People"	2005	24	4	—	4	88	—	—	20	—	4	RIAA: 2× Platinum; ARIA: Platinum; BPI: Platinum	Get Lifted
"Number One" (featuring Kanye West)	2005	—	—	—	86	—	—	—	—	—	62		Get Lifted
"So High" (featuring Lauryn Hill)	2005	— (Note: "So High" did not enter the Billboard Hot 100, but peaked at number 5 on the Bubbling Under Hot 100 Singles chart, which acts as an extension to the Hot 100.)	—	—	53	—	—	—	—	—	118		Get Lifted
"Save Room"	2006	61	17	7	17	—	—	6	11	—	—	RIAA: Gold	Once Again
"Heaven"	2006	— (Note: "Heaven" did not enter the Billboard Hot 100, but peaked at number 12 on the Bubbling Under Hot 100 Singles chart, which acts as an extension to the Hot 100.)	—	—	26	—	—	—	—	—	—		Once Again
"P.D.A. (We Just Don't Care)"	2007	—	—	—	—	—	—	—	18	—	199		Once Again
"Stereo"	2007	—	—	—	47	—	—	—	17	—	—		Once Again
"Another Again"	2007	—	—	—	30	—	—	—	—	—	—		Once Again
"Show Me"	2007	—	—	—	—	—	—	—	—	—	—		Once Again
"Someday"	2007	—	—	—	—	—	—	—	—	—	—		Non-album single
"Sun Comes Up"	2007	—	—	—	—	—	—	—	—	—	—		Live at SOB's
"Green Light" (featuring André 3000)	2008	24	4	—	6	—	94	19	46	81	35	RIAA: 2× Platinum	Evolver
"If You're Out There"	2008	— (Note: "If You're Out There" did not enter the Billboard Hot 100, but peaked at number 10 on the Bubbling Under Hot 100 Singles chart, which acts as an extension to the Hot 100.)	—	—	— (Note: "If You're Out There" did not enter the R&B/Hip-Hop Songs chart, but peaked at number 17 on the Bubbling Under R&B/Hip-Hop Singles chart, which acts as an extension to the R&B/Hip-Hop Songs chart.)	—	—	—	—	—	135		Evolver
"Everybody Knows"	2009	—	—	—	64	—	—	—	10	—	—		Evolver
"This Time"	2009	—	—	—	—	—	—	—	46	—	—		Evolver
"No Other Love" (featuring Estelle)	2009	—	—	—	—	—	—	—	—	—	—		Evolver
"Wake Up Everybody" (with The Roots, featuring Common and Melanie Fiona)	2010	—	—	6	53	—	—	—	16	62	179		Wake Up!
"Hard Times" (with The Roots, featuring Black Thought)	2010	—	—	—	—	—	—	—	—	—	—		Wake Up!
"Wake Up" (with The Roots)	2010	—	—	—	—	—	—	—	—	—	—		Non-album single
"When Christmas Comes" (with Mariah Carey)	2011	—	—	—	59	—	—	—	—	—	—		Merry Christmas II You
"Tonight (Best You Ever Had)" (featuring Ludacris)	2012	79	12	—	12	—	—	16	—	—	108	RIAA: 2× Platinum; ARIA: Gold; FIMI: Platinum	Think Like a Man soundtrack
"Who Do We Think We Are" (featuring Rick Ross)	2013	—	—	—	— (Note: "Who Do We Think We Are" did not enter the R&B/Hip-Hop Songs chart, but peaked at number 2 on the Bubbling Under R&B/Hip-Hop Singles chart, which acts as an extension to the R&B/Hip-Hop Songs chart.)	—	—	—	—	—	—		Love in the Future
"Made to Love"	2013	—	—	—	—	—	—	—	28	—	—		Love in the Future
"All of Me"	2013	1	1	32	1	1	1	8	1	1	2	RIAA: 14× Platinum; ARIA: 17× Platinum; BPI: 7× Platinum; FIMI: Gold; IFPI SWI: 2× Platinum; MC: 5× Platinum; NVPI: Platinum	Love in the Future
"You & I (Nobody in the World)"	2014	66	—	—	18	—	—	—	—	—	166	RIAA: Platinum; ARIA: Gold	Love in the Future
"Glory" (with Common)	2014	49	—	—	18	62	—	—	49	38	62		Selma
"Under the Stars"	2015	—	—	—	—	—	—	—	—	—	—		Non-album single
"Love Me Now"	2016	23	—	—	10	25	20	36	13	14	17	RIAA: 2× Platinum; ARIA: 3× Platinum; BPI: Platinum; FIMI: Platinum; IFPI SWI: Gold; MC: 2× Platinum; NVPI: 2× Platinum	Darkness and Light
"Penthouse Floor" (featuring Chance the Rapper)	2016	—	—	—	—	—	—	—	—	—	—		Darkness and Light
"Beauty and the Beast" (with Ariana Grande)	2017	87	—	—	—	64	70	—	—	—	52	RIAA: Gold; ARIA: Platinum; BPI: Silver	Beauty and the Beast
"God Only Knows" (featuring Cynthia Erivo & yMusic)	2017	—	—	—	—	—	—	—	—	—	—		Non-album singles
"In America"	2017	—	—	—	—	—	—	—	—	—	—		Non-album singles
"Surefire"	2017	—	—	—	—	—	—	—	—	—	—		Darkness and Light
"Woodstock"	2017	—	—	—	—	—	—	—	—	—	—		Non-album singles
"A Good Night" (featuring BloodPop)	2018	—	—	—	—	—	—	—	—	—	—		Non-album singles
"Preach"	2019	—	—	—	—	—	—	—	—	—	—		Non-album singles
"We Need Love" (from Songland)	2019	—	—	—	—	—	—	—	—	—	—		Non-album singles
"Happy Xmas (War Is Over)"	2019	69	—	—	—	—	—	—	—	—	9	RIAA: Gold	A Legendary Christmas
"Conversations in the Dark" (solo or with David Guetta)	2020	86	42	—	—	—	—	—	—	—	—	RIAA: Gold; ARIA: Gold	Bigger Love
"Actions"	2020	—	—	—	—	—	—	—	—	—	—		Bigger Love
"Bigger Love"	2020	—	—	—	—	—	—	—	—	—	—		Bigger Love
"Wild" (with Gary Clark Jr.)	2020	—	—	—	—	—	—	—	—	—	—	RIAA: Gold; ARIA: Gold	Bigger Love
"Minefields" (with Faouzia)	2020	—	—	—	—	—	—	—	—	—	—		Citizens
"Hallelujah" (with Carrie Underwood)	2020	54	—	—	—	—	—	—	—	—	—		My Gift
"In My Mind" (with Alok)	2021	—	—	—	—	—	—	—	—	—	—		Non-album singles
"You Deserve It All"	2021	— (Note: "You Deserve It All" did not enter the Billboard Hot 100, but peaked at number 10 on the Bubbling Under Hot 100 chart, which acts as an extension to the Hot 100.)	—	—	—	—	—	—	—	—	—		Non-album singles
"Tomorrow" (with Florian Picasso featuring Nas)	2022	—	—	—	—	—	—	—	—	—	—		Non-album singles
"Free"	2022	—	—	—	—	—	—	—	—	—	—		Non-album singles
"Dope" (featuring JID)	2022	—	—	—	—	—	—	—	—	—	—		Legend
"Honey" (featuring Muni Long)	2022	—	—	—	—	—	—	—	—	—	—		Legend
"All She Wanna Do" (solo or featuring Saweetie)	2022	—	—	—	—	—	—	—	—	—	—		Legend
"Nervous" (solo or remix featuring Sebastián Yatra)	2022	—	—	—	—	—	—	—	—	—	—		Legend
"Don't Need to Sleep"	2023	—	—	—	—	—	—	—	—	—	—		Non-album single
"L-O-V-E" (with Sufjan Stevens, featuring Chrissy, Luna and Miles)	2024	—	—	—	—	—	—	—	—	—	—		My Favorite Dream
"Safe" (featuring Michaël Brun and Rutshelle Guillaume)	2024	—	—	—	—	—	—	—	—	—	—		My Favorite Dream
"Daylight"	2026	—	—	—	—	—	—	—	—	—	—		Muse
"Fireflies" (with Pharrell Williams)	2026	—	—	—	—	—	—	—	—	—	—		Muse
"—" denotes releases that did not chart or were not released in that territory.

=== As featured artist ===
List of singles as featured artist, with selected chart positions, showing year released and album name
Title	Year	Peak chart positions									Certifications	Album
Title	Year	US	US Jazz	US Pop	US R&B	US Rap	AUS	CAN	IRL	UK	Certifications	Album
"Selfish" (Slum Village featuring Kanye West and John Legend)	2004	55	—	—	20	15	—	—	—	129		Detroit Deli (A Taste of Detroit)
"Grammy Family" (DJ Khaled featuring Kanye West, Consequence, and John Legend)	2006	—	—	—	— (Note: "Grammy Family" did not enter the R&B/Hip-Hop Songs chart, but peaked at number 24 on the Bubbling Under R&B/Hip-Hop Singles chart, which acts as an extension to the R&B/Hip-Hop Songs chart.)	—	—	—	—	—		Listennn... the Album and Don't Quit Your Day Job!
"Finally" (Fergie featuring John Legend)	2008	— (Note: "Finally" did not enter the Billboard Hot 100, but peaked at number 1 on the Bubbling Under Hot 100 Singles chart, which acts as an extension to the Hot 100.)	—	34	—	—	—	61	—	—		The Dutchess
"Stay with Me (By the Sea)" (Al Green featuring John Legend)	2008	—	16	—	49	—	—	—	—	—		Lay It Down
"Magnificent" (Rick Ross featuring John Legend)	2009	62	—	—	7	5	—	—	—	—		Deeper Than Rap
"Whatever You Want" (Consequence featuring Kanye West and John Legend)	2009	—	—	—	— (Note: "Whatever You Want" did not enter the Billboard Hot 100, but peaked at number 4 on the Bubbling Under R&B/Hip-Hop Singles chart, which acts as an extension to the Hot 100.)	—	—	—	—	—		Non-album single
"Heartbreaker" (MSTRKRFT featuring John Legend)	2009	—	—	—	—	—	63	—	—	50		Fist of God
"Move on Up" (Angélique Kidjo featuring John Legend)	2010	—	—	—	—	—	—	—	—	—		Õÿö
"Don't Give Up" (Herbie Hancock featuring John Legend and Pink)	2010	—	—	—	—	—	—	—	—	—		The Imagine Project
"Fall in Love" (Estelle featuring John Legend and Nas)	2010	—	—	—	71	—	—	—	—	—		All of Me
"Getting Nowhere" (Magnetic Man featuring John Legend)	2011	—	—	—	—	—	—	—	—	65		Magnetic Man
"Reminiscing" (Don Blaq featuring John Legend)	2012	—	—	—	—	—	—	—	—	—		Non-album single
"Dance the Pain Away" (Benny Benassi featuring John Legend)	2013	—	—	—	—	—	—	—	—	—		Danceaholic
"Don't Say Goodbye" (Sérgio Mendes featuring John Legend)	2014	—	—	—	—	—	—	—	—	—		Magic!
"Angel" (Stacy Barthe featuring John Legend)	2014	—	—	—	—	—	—	—	—	—		BEcoming
"Lay Me Down" (Sam Smith featuring John Legend)	2015	—	—	—	—	—	—	—	4	1	BPI: Platinum	Red Nose Day 2015
"Like I'm Gonna Lose You" (Meghan Trainor featuring John Legend)	2015	8	—	5	—	—	1	8	96	99	RIAA: 2× Platinum; ARIA: 8× Platinum; BPI: Platinum; MC: Gold	Title
"Listen" (David Guetta featuring John Legend)	2016	—	—	—	—	—	—	—	—	—		Listen
"Summer Nights" (Tiësto featuring John Legend)	2016	—	—	—	—	—	—	—	—	60		Non-album single
"Higher" (DJ Khaled featuring Nipsey Hussle and John Legend)	2019	21	—	—	9	7	—	40	—	48	RIAA: Gold	Father of Asahd
"Quisiera" (Flor de Toloache featuring John Legend and Cultura Profética)	2020	—	—	—	—	—	—	—	—	—		Indestructible
"Memories" (Buju Banton featuring John Legend)	2020	—	—	—	—	—	—	—	—	—		Upside Down 2020
"Drown" (Lecrae featuring John Legend)	2020	—	—	—	—	—	—	—	—	—		Restoration
"Tacones Rojos" (Sebastián Yatra featuring John Legend)	2022	—	—	—	—	—	—	—	—	—		Dharma +
"Heading for Home" (Rufus Wainwright featuring John Legend)	2023	—	—	—	—	—	—	—	—	—		Folkocracy
"The Show" (Niall Horan featuring John Legend)	2023	—	—	—	—	—	—	—	—	—		The Show
"Bridge Over Troubled Water" (Jacob Collier featuring John Legend and Tori Kelly)	2024	—	—	—	—	—	—	—	—	—		Djesse Vol. 4
"Summertime Blue" (Norah Jones featuring John Legend)	2025	—	—	—	—	—	—	—	—	—		TBA
"The Birds Don't Sing" (Clipse featuring John Legend)	2025	—	—	—	—	—	—	—	—	—		Let God Sort Em Out
"Church" (Tasha Cobbs Leonard featuring John Legend)	2025	—	—	—	—	—	—	—	—	—		TASHA
"—" denotes releases that did not chart or were not released in that territory.

=== Promotional singles ===
List of promotional singles, with selected chart positions, showing year released and album name
Title	Year	Peak chart positions	Album
Title	Year	US	Album
"I Know Better"	2016	—	Darkness and Light
"Last Time I Say Sorry" (with Kane Brown)	2020	89	Mixtape, Vol. 1
"—" denotes releases that did not chart or were not released in that territory.

== Other charted songs ==
List of songs, with selected chart positions, showing year released and album name
Title	Year	Peak chart positions			Certifications	Album
Title	Year	US	US Jazz	US R&B/HH	Certifications	Album
"Slow Dance"	2007	—	—	81		Once Again
"Each Day Gets Better"	2007	—	12	—		Once Again
"Good Morning"	2008	—	14	—		Evolver
"It's Over" (featuring Kanye West)	2008	—	—	— (Note: "It's Over" did not enter the R&B/Hip-Hop Songs chart, but peaked at number 18 on the Bubbling Under R&B/Hip-Hop Singles chart, which acts as an extension to the R&B/Hip-Hop Songs chart.)		Evolver
"Decision" (Busta Rhymes featuring Jamie Foxx, Mary J. Blige, John Legend, and Common)	2009	—	—	— (Note: "Decision" did not enter the R&B/Hip-Hop Songs chart, but peaked at number 10 on the Bubbling Under R&B/Hip-Hop Singles chart, which acts as an extension to the R&B/Hip-Hop Songs chart.)		Back on My B.S.
"Free Mason" (Rick Ross featuring Jay-Z and John Legend)	2010	—	—	— (Note: "Free Mason" did not enter the R&B/Hip-Hop Songs chart, but peaked at number 9 on the Bubbling Under R&B/Hip-Hop Singles chart, which acts as an extension to the R&B/Hip-Hop Songs chart.)		Teflon Don
"Shine" (with The Roots)	2010	—	—	64		Wake Up!
"So Special" (Lil Wayne featuring John Legend)	2011	95	—	—		Tha Carter IV
"Rich Forever" (Rick Ross featuring John Legend)	2012	—	—	— (Note: "Rich Forever" did not enter the R&B/Hip-Hop Songs chart, but peaked at number 8 on the Bubbling Under R&B/Hip-Hop Singles chart, which acts as an extension to the R&B/Hip-Hop Songs chart.)		Rich Forever
"One Man Can Change the World" (Big Sean featuring Kanye West and John Legend)	2015	82	—	27		Dark Sky Paradise
"Start a Fire"	2016	—	—	—		La La Land
"What Christmas Means to Me" (featuring Stevie Wonder)	2018	— (Note: "What Christmas Means to Me" did not enter the Billboard Hot 100, but peaked at number one on the Bubbling Under Hot 100 chart, which acts as an extension to the Hot 100.)	—	49	RIAA: Platinum	A Legendary Christmas
"Bring Me Love"	2018	—	—	—		A Legendary Christmas
"The Christmas Song (Chestnuts Roasting on an Open Fire)"	2018	—	—	—		A Legendary Christmas
"Have Yourself a Merry Little Christmas" (featuring Esperanza Spalding)	2018	—	—	—		A Legendary Christmas
"Baby, It's Cold Outside" (featuring Kelly Clarkson)	2019	—	—	—		A Legendary Christmas
"U Move, I Move" (featuring Jhené Aiko)	2020	— (Note: "U Move, I Move" did not enter the Billboard Hot 100, but peaked at number 25 on the Bubbling Under Hot 100 chart.)	—	—		Bigger Love
"God Did" (DJ Khaled featuring Rick Ross, Lil Wayne, Jay-Z, John Legend, and Fridayy)	2022	17	—	6		God Did
"On Time" (with Metro Boomin)	2022	48	—	17		Heroes & Villains
"—" denotes releases that did not chart or were not released in that territory.

== Guest appearances ==
List of non-single guest appearances, with other performing artists, showing year released and album name
Title	Year	Other artist(s)	Album
"Swing by My Way"	2003	will.i.am	Must B 21
"Ride Ride"	2003	will.i.am	Must B 21
"Summer Kiss"	2003	Gerald Veasley	Velvet
"Me Against the Music" (Kanye West Remix) (Backing vocals)	2003	Britney Spears	Me Against the Music (Remix EP)
"This Love" (Kanye West Remix) (Backing vocals)	2004	Maroon 5	—N/a
"Hey Girl"	2004	Estelle	The 18th Day
"Freedom"	2004	Estelle	The 18th Day
"U Know"	2004	White Boy	No Gray Area
"So Soulful"	2004	Consequence	Take 'Em To The Cleaners
"Getting Out the Game"	2004	Consequence	Take 'Em To The Cleaners
"And You Say"	2004	Consequence	Take 'Em To The Cleaners
"Around My Way"	2004	Talib Kweli	The Beautiful Struggle
"Faithful"	2005	Common	Be
"They Say"	2005	Common	Be
"Grown Man Pt. 2"	2005	Young Gunz	Brothers from Another
"I've Been Waiting on You"	2005	Miri Ben-Ari	The Hip-Hop Violinist
"Like That"	2005	The Black Eyed Peas, Q-Tip, Talib Kweli, CeeLo Green	Monkey Business
"Love Won't Let Me Wait"	2005	none	So Amazing: An All-Star Tribute to Luther Vandross
"Touch"	2005	Ray Charles	Genius & Friends
"Hello, It's Me"	2005	none	GAP - Favorite Songs
"Please Don't Stop"	2005	Richard Bona	Tiki
"High Road"	2005	Fort Minor	The Rising Tied
"Home"	2005	Kanye West	Freshmen Adjustment
"Please Baby Don't"	2006	Sérgio Mendes	Timeless
"Sing You Sinners"	2006	Tony Bennett	Duets: An American Classic
"Do U Wanna Ride"	2006	Jay-Z	Kingdom Come
"King & Queen"	2006	Mary J. Blige	Reflections (A Retrospective)
"Tōkage"	2006	Chemistry	Face to Face
"Feel This Way"	2007	Consequence	Don't Quit Your Day Job
"Ghetto Rich"	2007	Rich Boy	Rich Boy
"Eternity Intro"	2007	Big & Rich	Between Raising Hell and Amazing Grace
"Eternity"	2007	Big & Rich	Between Raising Hell and Amazing Grace
"Celebrate"	2007	Cassidy	B.A.R.S. The Barry Adrian Reese Story
"What Y'all Came to Do"	2007	Aretha Franklin	Jewels in the Crown: All-Star Duets with the Queen
"Slide Show"	2008	T.I.	Paper Trail
"Come Over"	2008	Estelle	Shine
"You Are"	2008	Estelle	Shine
"Decision"	2009	Busta Rhymes, Jamie Foxx, Mary J. Blige, Common	Back on My B.S.
"Entreolhares (The Way You Look at Me)"	2009	Ana Carolina	N9ve
"Let's Stop Playin'"	2009	Ghostface Killah	Ghostdini: Wizard of Poetry in Emerald City
"No Importa"	2009	Noel Schajris	Uno No Es Uno
"The Fire"	2010	The Roots	How I Got Over (album)
"Doing It Again"	2010	The Roots	How I Got Over (album)
"Blame Game"	2010	Kanye West	My Beautiful Dark Twisted Fantasy
"Christian Dior Denim Flow"	2010	Kanye West, Kid Cudi, Pusha T, Lloyd Banks, Ryan Leslie	GOOD Fridays release
"The Way You Make Me Feel"	2010	Stevie Wonder	The 25th Anniversary Rock & Roll Hall of Fame Concerts
"Victory"	2010	DJ Khaled, Nas	Victory
"Never Forget You"	2011	Lupe Fiasco	Lasers
"Eyez Closed"	2011	Snoop Dogg, Kanye West	Doggumentary
"Memories (Part II)"	2011	Big Sean	Finally Famous
"So Special"	2011	Lil Wayne	Tha Carter IV
"Karma"	2011	Tiziano Ferro	L'amore è una cosa semplice
"The Believer"	2011	Common	The Dreamer, The Believer
"L.O.V.E."	2012	Melanie Fiona	The MF Life
"Ghetto Dreams"	2012	2 Chainz, Scarface	Based on a T.R.U. Story
"Sin City"	2012	Travis Scott, Teyana Taylor, Cyhi the Prynce, Malik Yusef	Kanye West Presents: GOOD Music – Cruel Summer
"Bliss"	2012	Teyana Taylor	Kanye West Presents: GOOD Music – Cruel Summer
"Maybach Curtains"	2012	Meek Mill, Nas, Rick Ross	Dreams and Nightmares
"Why Do I Even Go Home?"	2013	Consequence	Movies on Demand 4
"Never Surrender"	2013	DJ Khaled, Akon, Anthony Hamilton, Jadakiss, Meek Mill, Scarface	Suffering from Success
"Bridges"	2013	Rebecca Ferguson	Freedom
"What Kind of Fool"	2014	Barbra Streisand	Partners
"Run Run Run"	2015	Kelly Clarkson	Piece by Piece
"God"	2015	Scarface	Deeply Rooted
"Most High"	2015	DJ Khaled	I Changed a Lot
"Free Enterprise"	2015	Rick Ross	Black Market
"Happy Birthday"	2016	Kygo	Cloud Nine
"Another Summer"	2016	Mustard, Rick Ross, James Fauntleroy	Cold Summer
"Leave It to the Sky"	2016	Muddy Magnolias	Broken People
"Rain"	2016	Common	Black America Again
"Holiday"	2017	Calvin Harris, Snoop Dogg, Takeoff	Funk Wav Bounces Vol. 1
"I'll Be Gentle"	2017	Paloma Faith	The Architect
"Written In The Stars"	2018	Wendy	Station X 0
"A Safe Place to Land"	2019	Sara Bareilles	Amidst the Chaos
"All Day Long"	2019	Chance the Rapper	The Big Day
"Maybach Music VI"	2019	Rick Ross, Lil Wayne	Port of Miami 2
"The Real MVP"	2019	Jeezy	TM104: The Legend of the Snowman
"Lightning & Thunder"	2020	Jhené Aiko	Chilombo
"Last Time I Say Sorry"	2020	Kane Brown	Mixtape, Vol. 1
"Die Under the Moon"	2021	Yung Bleu	Moon Boy
"Where Is Your Heart"	2021	Diane Warren	The Cave Sessions: Vol. 1
"The Christmas Song (Chestnuts Roasting on an Open Fire)"	2021	Nat King Cole	A Sentimental Christmas with Nat King Cole and Friends: Cole Classics Reimagined
"Touch the Sky"	2021	French Montana, Rick Ross	They Got Amnesia
"Kim Porter"	2023	Diddy, Babyface	The Love Album: Off the Grid
"Never Let Go"	2025	Offset	Kiari

== Soundtrack appearances ==
Song	Year	Album
"Don't You Worry 'Bout a Thing"	2005	Hitch soundtrack
"Who Did That to You?"	2012	Django Unchained soundtrack
"My Imagination"	2015	Finding Neverland The Album (Songs From The Broadway Musical)
"Start"	2016	Southside with You (Music From the Motion Picture)
"History Has Its Eyes on You"	2016	The Hamilton Mixtape
"One Woman Man"	2017	Fifty Shades Darker (Original Motion Picture Soundtrack)
"What's The Buzz / Strange Thing Mystifying" (with Sarah Bareilles and Brandon Victor Dixon)	2018	Jesus Christ Superstar Live in Concert (Original Soundtrack of the NBC Television Event)
"Everything's Alright" (with Sarah Bareilles and Brandon Victor Dixon)	2018	Jesus Christ Superstar Live in Concert (Original Soundtrack of the NBC Television Event)
"Hosanna" (with Norm Lewis)	2018	Jesus Christ Superstar Live in Concert (Original Soundtrack of the NBC Television Event)
"Simon Zealotes / Poor Jerusalem" (with Erik Grönwall)	2018	Jesus Christ Superstar Live in Concert (Original Soundtrack of the NBC Television Event)
"The Temple"	2018	Jesus Christ Superstar Live in Concert (Original Soundtrack of the NBC Television Event)
"Everything's Alright (Reprise)" (with Sarah Bareilles)	2018	Jesus Christ Superstar Live in Concert (Original Soundtrack of the NBC Television Event)
"The Last Supper" (with Brandon Victor Dixon)	2018	Jesus Christ Superstar Live in Concert (Original Soundtrack of the NBC Television Event)
"Gethsemane (I Only Want to Say)"	2018	Jesus Christ Superstar Live in Concert (Original Soundtrack of the NBC Television Event)
"Transition"	2018	Jesus Christ Superstar Live in Concert (Original Soundtrack of the NBC Television Event)
"The Arrest" (with Jason Tam, Jin Ha and Norm Lewis)	2018	Jesus Christ Superstar Live in Concert (Original Soundtrack of the NBC Television Event)
"Pilate and Christ" (with Ben Daniels and Jin Ha)	2018	Jesus Christ Superstar Live in Concert (Original Soundtrack of the NBC Television Event)
"Trial Before Pilate (Including The 39 Lashes)" (with Ben Daniels, Jin Ha and Norm Lewis)	2018	Jesus Christ Superstar Live in Concert (Original Soundtrack of the NBC Television Event)
"The Crucifixion"	2018	Jesus Christ Superstar Live in Concert (Original Soundtrack of the NBC Television Event)
"Curtain Call" (with Sarah Bareilles, Brandon Victor Dixon, Alice Cooper, Ben Daniels, Norm Lewis, Jin Ha, Jason Tam and Erik Grönwall)	2018	Jesus Christ Superstar Live in Concert (Original Soundtrack of the NBC Television Event)

== Production discography ==
List of production credits, including non-performing songwriting or other contribution credits for other artists
Track(s)	Year	Credit(s)	Artist(s)	Album
13. "Everything Is Everything"	1998	Keyboards	Lauryn Hill	The Miseducation of Lauryn Hill
10. "The Boogie That Be"	2003	Songwriter	Black Eyed Peas	Elephunk
4. "Encore"	2003	Songwriter, additional vocals	Jay-Z	The Black Album
4. "Slow Jamz"; (with Kanye West featuring Jamie Foxx)	2004	Keyboards	Twista	Kamikaze
5. "Overnight Celebrity"	2004	Keyboards	Twista	Kamikaze
3. "Graduation Day"	2004	Additional vocals, keyboards, songwriter	Kanye West	The College Dropout
11. "The New Workout Plan"	2004	Songwriter	Kanye West	The College Dropout
12. "I Want You"	2004	Songwriter	Janet Jackson	Damita Jo
6. "I Try"; (featuring Mary J. Blige)	2004	Songwriter	Talib Kweli	The Beautiful Struggle
9. "What Can I Do?"; (featuring Missy Elliott)	2004	Keyboards, additional vocals	Shawnna	Worth tha Weight
10. "Hey Girl"; (featuring John Legend)	2004	Co-producer (with Joe Buhdah and E-Boogie)	Estelle	The 18th Day
5. "Believer"	2005	Songwriter	Christina Milian	Various artists – Be Cool
2. "I Changed My Mind"	2005	Songwriter	Keyshia Cole	The Way It Is
13. "Finally"; (featuring John Legend)	2006	Producer (with Ron Fair)	Fergie	The Dutchess
4. "Love Is You"	2007	Producer, piano	Chrisette Michele	I Am
5. "Good Life"; (featuring T-Pain)	2007	Songwriter, additional vocals	Kanye West	Graduation
—N/a	2008	Executive producer	Estelle	Shine
1. "Wait a Minute (Just a Touch)"	2008	Songwriter	Estelle	Shine
2. "No Substitute Love"	2008	Songwriter	Estelle	Shine
3. "American Boy"; (featuring Kanye West)	2008	Songwriter	Estelle	Shine
4. "More Than Friends"	2008	Songwriter	Estelle	Shine
6. "Come Over"; (featuring Sean Paul)	2008	Songwriter	Estelle	Shine
9. "Back In Love"	2008	Songwriter	Estelle	Shine
11. "Pretty Please (Love Me)"; (featuring Cee-Lo)	2008	Songwriter	Estelle	Shine
12. "Shine"	2008	Songwriter	Estelle	Shine
13. "I Wanna Live"	2008	Songwriter	Estelle	Shine (Japanese/iTunes edition)
6. "The Promise"	2008	Co-producer (with Devo Springsteen), keyboards	Deborah Cox	The Promise
2. "Move On Me"	2009	Piano, songwriter	Fink	Sort of Revolution
9. "Maker"	2009	Songwriter	Fink	Sort of Revolution
8. "Sweet Life"; (featuring John Legend)	2010	Producer	Rick Ross	The Albert Anastasia EP
11. "All the Boys"	2010	Songwriter	Keri Hilson	No Boys Allowed
3. "Free Mason"; (featuring Jay-Z)	2010	Additional vocals, songwriter	Rick Ross	Teflon Don
11. "Watch the Sunrise"	2010	Songwriter, keyboards, additional vocals	Cassandra Wilson	Silver Pony
5. "I Don't Know Why, But I Do"	2010	Songwriter	Chrisette Michele	Let Freedom Reign
5. "Silver&Gold"	2011	Producer (with Jerry Duplessis)	Musiq Soulchild	MusiqInTheMagiq
9. "I Miss You Now"	2011	Songwriter	Ledisi	Pieces of Me
13. "You Win"	2011	Producer (with Patrick Warren)	Pixie Lott	Young Foolish Happy
1. "Baby Come Home"	2012	Keyboards, songwriter	Scissor Sisters	Magic Hour
—N/a	2012	Executive producer	Estelle	All of Me
5. "Cold Crush"	2012	Songwriter	Estelle	All of Me
7. "Break My Heart"; (featuring Rick Ross)	2012	Songwriter	Estelle	All of Me
3. "When It's All Over"	2012	Songwriter	Alicia Keys	Girl on Fire
4. "Listen to Your Heart"	2012	Songwriter	Alicia Keys	Girl on Fire
16. "I Come Apart"; (featuring Florence Welch)	2013	Songwriter	ASAP Rocky	Long. Live. ASAP
6. "All of Me"	2013	Producer (with Dave Tozer)	John Legend	Love in the Future
8. "Save the Night"	2013	Producer (with Dave Tozer)	John Legend	Love in the Future
11. "Dreams"	2013	Producer (with Dave Tozer)	John Legend	Love in the Future
14. "You & I (Nobody in the World)"	2013	Producer (with Dave Tozer)	John Legend	Love in the Future
10. "Bound 2"	2013	Songwriter	Kanye West	Yeezus
3. "Take Me"	2014	Songwriter	Paloma Faith	A Perfect Contradiction
11. "Nobody But You"	2014	Songwriter, keyboards	Kimbra	The Golden Echo
—N/a	2015	Executive producer	Stacy Barthe	BEcoming
5. "Here I Am"	2015	Songwriter	Stacy Barthe	BEcoming
14. "(I Guess I) Miss You"	2017	Songwriter	Ethan Slater, Danny Skinner (as "SpongeBob SquarePants" and "Patrick Star" respectively)	SpongeBob SquarePants, The New Musical (Original Cast Recording)
9. "End In Love"	2018	Producer (with RedOne, Sean Garrett and T.I. Jakke)	Jordan Smith	Only Love
3. "Once I Was Loved"	2018	Songwriter	Jennifer Warnes	Another Time, Another Place
9. "The Big Day"; (featuring Francis and the Lights)	2019	Songwriter	Chance the Rapper	The Big Day
"Something New"	2019	Songwriter	Ollie Gabriel	Songland
1. "This Day"	2021	Songwriter	Justin Cornwell, Sharon Rose	Jingle Jangle: A Christmas Journey (soundtrack)
9. "Make It Work"	2021	Songwriter	Forest Whitaker, Anika Noni Rose	Jingle Jangle: A Christmas Journey (soundtrack)
6. "Where Is Your Heart"; (featuring John Legend)	2021	Producer	Diane Warren	Diane Warren: The Cave Sessions Vol 1
6. "Believe It"	2023	Songwriter, additional vocals	Rob Murat	Good Day Good People
