= Take 'em to the Cleaners =

Mixtape by Consequence
- Released: June 22, 2004
- Recorded: 2002–2004
- Genre: Hip-hop
- Length: 52:10
- Label: Sure Shot Recordings
- Producers: 88 Keys; 9th Wonder; Baby Paul; Devo Springsteen; J Dilla (uncredited); Kanye West; Stay Bent

Consequence chronology
The Cons Vol. 2: Make The Game Come To You (2003)	Take 'em to the Cleaners (2004)	A Tribe Called Quence (2005)

Take 'em to the Cleaners is the third mixtape by the American rapper Consequence. It was released by Sure Shot Recordings on June 22, 2004. The mixtape features prominent contributions from rapper and producer Kanye West, who is credited as the host. Guest appearances include West, Talib Kweli, Common, John Legend, Khayree, Little Brother, Q-Tip, and Rhymefest.

Consequence supported the mixtape with its sole lead single, "Yard 2 Yard", released in late 2002. The mixtape was released in early relation to West's label GOOD Music. Take 'Em To The Cleaners received generally positive reviews from critics, with many crediting its production.

== Background and recording ==
Take 'em to the Cleaners development began in late 2002, with the release of its lead single "Yard 2 Yard", which was initially included on Consequence's mixtape The Cons Vol. 1: All Sales Are Final. According to Consequence in an interview with Revolt, the majority of the mixtape was recorded at Kanye West's house. During these sessions, West further developed his debut studio album The College Dropout. Consequence recalled West stating that he was "about to learn how to record" himself. Consequence assembled the mixtape during the early years of his relationship with West's label GOOD Music, with XXL noting that it was the first release affiliated with the label.

== Musical style ==
Take 'em to the Cleaners is a hip-hop mixtape, noted by XXL for its new sound, building on West's established soul production. The mixtape's sound has been compared to West's The College Dropout, with James Corne of RapReviews stating that it "closely resembles the ‘feel good’ type of tracks that defined the College Dropout." Exclaim!'s Chris Penrose highlighted the mixtape's soulful production, vast subject matter, and strong guest features, describing it as resembling an album rather than a mixtape. The A.V. Club described the mixtape's sound as soulful and melodic, with amusing deliveries, advanced by Consequence's lyricism.

=== Songs and lyrics ===
The A.V. Club framed the mixtape's lyrical themes as a mix of humorous and storytelling-driven, assisted by Consequence's chemistry with collaborators. "Doctor, Doctor" features lyrics about sex, in which MVRemix described Consequence's output as egotistical. In "Wack Niggas," rappers Common, West, and Talib Kweli criticize "fake thugs." "I See Now" is a story-driven song about romance. Similarly, "Getting Out The Game" features West and Consequence trading stories about women, including one named Linda.

== Release ==
The mixtape was officially released on June 22, 2004, by Sure Shot Recordings on CD; reissued to streaming services in 2023 through 192 Records.

== Critical reception ==
Kanye West (pictured in 2006) was praised for his production on the mixtape.

Take 'em to the Cleaners ratings
Review scores
Source	Rating
Pitchfork	7/10
Prefixmag	7/10
MVRemix	7/10
RapReviews	6/10
AllHipHop	1/2 stars

Take 'em to the Cleaners received generally positive reviews from music critics. Jamin Warren of Pitchfork rated the mixtape 7/10, praising Kanye West's production and the strong guest features, while expressing the flaws of Consequence's assertive take, arguing that he's overshadowed throughout. Prefixmag's Brian Su-Jen gave the mixtape a rating of 7/10, praising its soulful production, collaborators, and clever lyricism, but criticizing its limited thematic range and the excessive use of skits. MVRemix gave it a 7/10 rating, applauding Kanye West and 88 Keys' production, while noting Consequence's dependence on West and the mixtape's weak hooks. James Corne of RapReviews gave the mixtape a rating of 6/10, crediting its 'feel-good' sound though criticizing how Consequence was comparatively overshadowed to guest vocalists.

AllHipHop's founder, Greg Watkins, reviewed the project, along with a staff rating of 1/2, commending Consequence's lyricism and ability, but criticized the alleged misogynistic moments.

== Legacy ==
Years after its release, several tracks from Take 'em to the Cleaners have gained retrospective attention. In a 2012 ranking of Kanye West's song catalog, FakeShoreDrive listed "So Soulful", "I See Now", and "Getting Out the Game", noting the strong chemistry between West and Consequence.

The mixtape also maintained a small following prior to its streaming reissue. In early 2021, XXL listed Take 'em to the Cleaners on their list of 'the Hip-Hop Mixtapes We Need on Streaming Services ASAP,' crediting the production, rap style, and its significance in early GOOD Music history.

== Track listing ==
Take 'em to the Cleaners
No.	Title	Producer(s)	Length
1.	"Quence Is Family Intro" (featuring Angie Martinez and Cipha Sounds)		0:38
2.	"Super Good (Skit)" (featuring Kanye West)		0:50
3.	"So Soulful" (featuring Kanye West and Khayree)	Kanye West	3:42
4.	"Yard 2 Yard" (featuring Rhymefest)	West	3:23
5.	"Doctor, Doctor"	88 Keys	3:03
6.	"Wack Niggas" (featuring Common, Kanye West and Talib Kweli)	West	4:34
7.	"Niggas Tried To? (Freestyle)"		1:59
8.	"03 'Til Infinity (Freestyle)" (featuring Kanye West)		2:48
9.	"You & Your Nigga"	Stay Bent	4:15
10.	"I See Now" (featuring Kanye West and Little Brother)	9th Wonder	4:44
11.	"And You Say" (featuring John Legend)	Devo Springsteen	3:51
12.	"Getting Out the Game" (featuring Kanye West)	West	3:10
13.	"Joints From the Crib (Skit)"		0:50
14.	"Take It As a Loss" (featuring Kanye West)	West	3:01
15.	"Trains"	88 Keys	3:02
16.	"Super Good Pt. 2 (Freestyle)"		1:22
17.	"The Incredible Hulk" (featuring John Legend)	88 Keys	3:44
18.	"Turn Ya Self In" (bonus track)	Baby Paul	3:14
19.	"Mixtape Inc. Outro"		2:46
Total length:			54:56

Bonus tracks
No.	Title	Length
22.	"Classic Con (Skit)"	0:23
23.	"The Consequences"	2:27
Total length:		2:50

=== Track notes ===
- "03 'Til Infinity (Freestyle)" is an adaptation of "'93 'Til Infinity" by Souls of Mischief.
- "Getting Out The Game" features a sample of "What A Wonderful Thing Love Is" by Al Green.
- "The Consequences" features production attributed to J Dilla.

== Release history ==
Region	Date	Label(s)	Format(s)	Ref.
United States	June 22, 2004	Sure Shot Recordings	CD	
Various	2023	192 Records	Digital download	
