= Solo Sessions Vol. 1: Live at the Knitting Factory =

Live album by John Legend
- Released: (United States) 2004
- Recorded: July 2003
- Genre: Soul; R&B
- Length: 57:42
- Label: The Knitting Factory
- Producer: John Legend; Dave Tozer; Kanye West

John Legend chronology
Live at SOB's (2002)	Solo Sessions Vol. 1: Live at the Knitting Factory (2004)	Get Lifted (2004)

Solo Sessions Vol. 1: Live at the Knitting Factory is a live album by John Legend.

Recorded in July 2003 at the Knitting Factory in New York City, this album features John performing solo on the acoustic piano with special guest appearances by Kanye West, J. Ivy, and Imani Uzuri.

== Track listing ==
1. "Introduction" by J. Ivy
2. "Lifted"
3. "Do What I Gotta Do"
4. "She Don't Have To Know"
5. "Don't Let Me Be Misunderstood"
6. "Sun Comes Up"
7. "Stay With You"
8. "So High" (featuring J. Ivy)
9. "If This World Were Mine" (featuring Imani Uzuri)
10. "All Falls Down" (featuring Kanye West)
11. "Motherless Child"
12. "Refuge"
13. "Must Be the Way"
