= Legend (John Legend album) =

Studio album by John Legend
- Released: September 9, 2022
- Length: 81:02
- Labels: John Legend; Republic
- Producers: Tommy Brown; Rogét Chahayed; Di Genius; Ryan Daly; Andrew DeRoberts; Free Nationals; Harv; Jonas Karlsson; Ian Kirkpatrick; John Legend; Lindgren; Connor McDonough; Milck; Mr. Franks; Mr Hudson; The Monsters & Strangerz; Murda Beatz; Oak; Pink Sweats; Michael Pollack; Justin Raisen; Gabriel Roth; John Ryan; Sadpony; Some Randoms; Zach Skelton; Gian Stone; Ryan Tedder; Tone; Gregg Wattenberg

John Legend chronology
Bigger Love (2020)	Legend (2022)	My Favorite Dream (2024)

Singles from Legend
- 1. "Dope" Released: May 18, 2022; 2. "Honey" Released: June 17, 2022; 3. "All She Wanna Do" Released: August 5, 2022; 4. "Nervous" Released: November 4, 2022

Legend is the ninth studio album by American singer John Legend. It was released on September 9, 2022, through John Legend Music Inc. and Republic Records.

== Critical reception ==
Professional ratings
Review scores
Source	Rating
AllMusic	3/5 stars
Pitchfork	6.7/10

Legend received a polarized response upon release. AllMusic editor Andy Kellman called Legend "a set distinguishable from the rest of his catalog mainly for its length and crowd of collaborators." He found that "Legend is at his best when entertainment isn't his objective." Rolling Stone critic David Browne remarked that "Legend lets loose on the first half and shows tasteful restraint on the other."

== Track listing ==
Disc 1
No.	Title	Writer(s)	Producer(s)	Length
1.	"Rounds" (featuring Rick Ross)	John Stephens; William Roberts II; Drew Love; Rogét Chahayed; Daniel Klein; Matthew Campfield; Andrew DeRoberts; Tommy Tiki Torch	Chahayed; Some Randoms; John Legend^{[c]}; Ryan Tedder^{[c]}; DeRoberts^{[c]}	3:54
2.	"Waterslide"	Stephens; Julia Michaels; Justin Tranter; Eren Cannata; Bernard Harvey	Tedder; Harv; DeRoberts	3:05
3.	"Dope" (featuring JID)	Stephens; Destin Route; Charlie Puth; Tedder; Ian Kirkpatrick	Tedder^{[p]}; Kirkpatrick; Tim McClain^{[v]}	2:38
4.	"Strawberry Blush" (featuring Free Nationals)	Stephens; José Rios; Ron Avant; Kelsey Gonzalez; Matt Merisola; Tedder; Love; Melvin Moore	Free Nationals; Gabriel Roth^{[a]}	3:15
5.	"Guy Like Me"	Stephens; Tedder; DeRoberts	Tedder; DeRoberts; Roth^{[b]}	2:39
6.	"All She Wanna Do"	Stephens; Michael Pollack; Jake Torrey; Tia Scola; Jeff Halavacs; Tedder; Stefan Johnson; Jordan K. Johnson; Zach Skelton	Tedder^{[p]}; The Monsters & Strangerz; Skelton; DeRoberts	3:11
7.	"Splash" (featuring Ty Dolla Sign and Jhené Aiko)	Stephens; Tyrone Griffin Jr.; Love; Moore; Anthony M. Jones; Akeel Henry; Kevin Ekofo	Tone; Henry^{[c]}; Ekofo^{[c]}	3:54
8.	"You"	Stephens; Tayla Parx; Kameron Glasper; Warren Felder; Alex Nice; Keith "Ten4" Sorrells	Oak; Nice^{[c]}; Sorrells^{[c]}	2:53
9.	"Fate" (featuring Amber Mark)	Stephens; Jaramye Daniels; Trey Campbell; Jonas Karlsson	Jonas Karlsson; Legend^{[c]}; LDG^{[a]}; Campbell^{[v]}	3:31
10.	"Love" (featuring Jazmine Sullivan)	Stephens; David Bowden; Dante Bowden; Joseph Ruffin	Tedder; Pink Sweats; Dante Bowden^{[c]}; Ruffin^{[c]}; Roth^{[a]}	2:53
11.	"One Last Dance"	Stephens; Love; Moore; Ekofo; Jones	Tone	4:01
12.	"All She Wanna Do" (with Saweetie)	Stephens; Diamonté Harper; Pollack; Torrey; Scola; Halavacs; Larrance Dopson; Tedder; S. Johnson; J. Johnson; Skelton	Tedder^{[p]}; The Monsters & Strangerz; Skelton; DeRoberts	3:15
Total length:				39:09

Disc 2
No.	Title	Writer(s)	Producer(s)	Length
1.	"Memories"	Stephens; David Bowden; Dante Bowden; Ruffin	Pink Sweats; Dante Bowden^{[c]}; Ruffin^{[c]}	2:55
2.	"Nervous"	Stephens; Pollack; John Ryan	Ryan	3:08
3.	"Wonder Woman"	Stephens; Tedder; Connor McDonough^{[p]}; Riley McDonough; Toby McDonough; Ryan Daly; Castle; Curtis Mayfield	C. McDonough^{[p]}; Tedder; Daly	2:48
4.	"Honey" (featuring Muni Long)	Stephens; Melanie Fontana; Gregory Hein; Tedder; Harvey; Steven Franks	Tedder; Harv; Tommy Brown; Mr. Franks; Lindgren; Campbell^{[v]}	2:20
5.	"I Want You to Know"	Stephens; Fontana; Lauren Frawley; Franks; Stephen McGregor; Lindgren	Tedder; Mr. Franks; Lindgren; Di Genius; Roth^{[a]}	3:31
6.	"Speak in Tongues" (featuring Jada Kingdom)	Stephens; Jada Murphy; Verse Simmonds; Akil King; McGregor	Di Genius; Roth^{[a]}	3:48
7.	"The Other Ones" (featuring Rapsody)	Stephens; Marlanna Evans; Love; Moore; Shane Lindstrom; Benjamin McIldowie; Akira Kosemura	Tedder; Murda Beatz; Mr Hudson	3:38
8.	"Stardust"	Stephens; Milck	Milck; Gregg Wattenberg	4:16
9.	"Pieces"	Stephens; Dan Wilson; Johnnie Newman; Justin Raisen; Jeremiah Raisen	Justin Raisen; Sadpony	3:18
10.	"Good" (featuring Ledisi)	Stephens; Harvey; Tiara Thomas; Frank Romano	Legend; Tedder; Roth^{[a]}	4:27
11.	"I Don't Love You Like I Used To"	Stephens; Pollack; Gian Stone; Davin Kingston	Tedder; Pollack; Stone; Kingston^{[a]}	3:13
12.	"Home"	Stephens; David Bowden; Dante Bowden; Ruffin	Pink Sweats; Dante Bowden^{[c]}; Ruffin^{[c]}	4:31
Total length:				41:53

Notes

- ^{^[p]} signifies a primary and vocal producer
- ^{^[c]} signifies a co-producer
- ^{^[a]} signifies an additional producer
- ^{^[v]} signifies a vocal producer

== Personnel ==
=== Volume 1 ===
Musicians

- John Legend – vocals (all tracks), keyboards (tracks 2, 11), piano (6, 8, 12)
- Ayana George – background vocals (1–6, 8, 10, 12)
- Natalie Imani – background vocals (1–6, 8–10, 12)
- SheNice Johnson – background vocals (1–6, 8, 10, 12)
- Ian Hendrickson-Smith – baritone saxophone (1, 2, 4, 5, 10, 11)
- Scott Mayo – flute, tenor saxophone (1); baritone saxophone, tenor saxophone (8, 9)
- Andrew DeRoberts – guitar, keyboards (1, 2, 5, 6, 12); bass guitar, drums (1, 2, 6, 12); additional vocals (1, 2), programming (2), percussion (5), drum programming (6)
- Erick Walls – guitar (1, 3, 9), keyboards (1)
- Neal Sugarman – tenor saxophone (1, 4, 5, 10, 11)
- Lemar Guillary – trombone (1, 8, 9)
- Dave Guy – trumpet (1, 2, 4, 5, 10, 11); baritone saxophone, flute (1)
- Brandyn Phillips – trumpet (1, 8, 9)
- Drew Love – additional vocals (1)
- Lemar Carter – drums (1)
- Rogét Chahayed – keyboards (1)
- Ryan Tedder – additional vocals (2, 3, 5, 6, 12), keyboards (2, 6, 12), programming (2, 5), drum programming (3, 6, 12), guitar (3, 12), percussion (3)
- Cochemea Gastelum – baritone saxophone (2)
- Eren Cannata – guitar (2)
- Harv – keyboards, programming (2)
- Charlie Puth – additional vocals, keyboards (3)
- Ian Kirkpatrick – bass guitar, drum programming, keyboards, percussion, programming (3)
- José Ríos – guitar (4)
- Hakeem Holloway – bass guitar (4)
- Kelsey Gonzalez – bass guitar (4)
- AJ Fanning – cello (4)
- Adrienne Woods – cello (4)
- Caleb Jones – cello (4)
- Julie Jung Yoo – cello (4)
- Michelle E. Rearick – cello (4)
- Ro Rowan – cello (4)
- Matt Merisola – drums (4)
- Matthew Jones – string arrangement (4)
- Drew Forde – viola (4)
- Karoline Menezes – viola (4)
- Richard Adkins – viola (4)
- Rita Andrade – viola (4)
- Stefan Smith – viola (4)
- Wilfred Farquharson – viola (4)
- Chris Woods – violin (4)
- Hannah White – violin (4)
- Jake Falby – violin (4)
- Jennifer Floyd – violin (4)
- Kayvon Sesar – violin (4)
- Lesa Terry – violin (4)
- Maxwell Karmazyn – violin (4)
- Nadira Scruggs – violin (4)
- Paul Cartwright – violin (4)
- Shigeru Logan – violin (4)
- Stephanie Matthews – violin (4)
- Stephanie Yu – violin (4)
- Susan Chatman – violin (4)
- T.Nava – Wurlitzer electronic piano (4)
- Karyn Porter – background vocals (5, 9)
- Bosco Mann – bass guitar (5, 11)
- Brian Wolfe – drums (5, 10)
- Fernando Velez – percussion (5, 10)
- Victor Axelrod – Rhodes (5), Wurlitzer electronic piano (10)
- The Monsters & Strangerz – drum programming, keyboards (6, 12)
- Zach Skelton – drum programming, keyboards (6, 12); guitar (12)
- Michael Pollack – keyboards (6)
- Akeel Henry – additional vocals, keyboards, programming (7)
- Anthony M. Jones – drums, keyboards, programming (7, 11); bass guitar (7)
- Kevin Ekofo – guitar (7)
- Andrew Kingslow – piano (7), glockenspiel (8)
- Oak – bass guitar, keyboards, programming (8)
- Keith "Ten4" Sorrells – drum programming (8)
- Alex Nice – keyboards, programming (8)
- Jaramye Daniels – additional vocals (9)
- Munyungo Jackson – percussion (9)
- David Bowden – bass guitar, drums (10)
- Dante Bowden – drums, keyboards, programming (10)
- Larissa Maestro – cello (11)
- Nicole Neely – string arrangement, viola (11)
- Shedrick Mitchell – string arrangement (11)
- Alicia Enstrom – violin (11)
- Kristin Weber – violin (11)

Technical

- Dave Kutch – mastering
- Serban Ghenea – mixing
- Tim McClain – engineering
- Rich Rich – engineering (1–3, 5, 6, 12)
- David Anthony – engineering (1)
- Neal Shaw – engineering (1, 4, 5, 11)
- Matt Merisola – engineering (4)
- Brian Warfield – engineering (7)
- Gregg Rominiecki – engineering (7)
- Rafae Fai Bautista – engineering, vocal mixing (7)
- Ricky P – engineering (7)
- Joe Gallagher – engineering (10)
- Joshua Keith – engineering (11)
- Johnscott Sanford – engineering, additional mixing (12)
- Kevin Peterson – mastering assistance
- Bryan Bordone – mixing assistance
- Alisse Laymac – engineering assistance (1, 4–9, 11)
- Peter Hanaman – engineering assistance (1, 4, 5, 7–9, 11)
- Matthew Sullivan – engineering assistance (1, 4, 5, 10)

=== Volume 2 ===
Musicians

- John Legend – vocals (all tracks), piano (3)
- David Bowden – string arrangement (1, 12); additional vocals, bass guitar, drums, guitar (1); keyboards (12)
- Dante Bowden – keyboards, programming, string arrangement (1, 12); bass guitar, guitar (1),
- Cremaine Booker – cello (1, 12)
- Nicole Neely – string arrangement (1, 12)
- Josée Weingand – viola (1, 12)
- Alicia Enstrom – violin (1, 12)
- Chauntee Ross – violin (1, 12)
- Paul Nelson – cello (2, 11)
- Erick Walls – electric guitar (2, 10)
- Michael Pollack – keyboards (2, 11)
- John Ryan – programming (2)
- Brandon Michael Collins – string arrangement (2)
- Monisa Angell – viola (2, 11)
- David Angell – violin (2, 11)
- David Davidson – violin (2, 11)
- Riley McDonough – background vocals (3)
- Scott Mayo – baritone saxophone (3), tenor saxophone (3)
- Bosco Mann – bass guitar (3)
- Hakeem Holloway – bass guitar (3, 9)
- AJ Fanning – cello (3, 7, 9)
- Adrienne Woods – cello (3, 7, 9)
- Caleb Jones – cello (3, 7, 9)
- Julie Jung Yoo – cello (3, 7, 9)
- Michelle E. Rearick – cello (3, 7, 9)
- Ro Rowan – cello (3, 7, 9)
- Homer Steinweiss – drums (3, 10)
- Connor McDonough – guitar (3), programming (3)
- Andrew Kingslow – Hammond B3 (3), piano (3, 10), tambourine (3)
- Ryan Daly – keyboards (3), programming (3)
- Lemar Guillary – trombone (3)
- Brandyn Phillips – trumpet (3)
- Drew Forde – viola (3, 7, 9)
- Karoline Menezes – viola (3, 7, 9)
- Richard Adkins – viola (3, 7, 9)
- Rita Andrade – viola (3, 7, 9)
- Stefan Smith – viola (3, 7, 9)
- Wilfred Farquharson – viola (3, 7, 9)
- Chris Woods – violin (3, 7, 9)
- Hannah White – violin (3, 7, 9)
- Jake Falby – violin (3, 7, 9)
- Jennifer Floyd – violin (3, 7, 9)
- Kayvon Sesar – violin (3, 7, 9)
- Lesa Terry – violin (3, 7, 9)
- Maxwell Karmazyn – violin (3, 7, 9)
- Nadira Scruggs – violin (3, 7, 9)
- Paul Cartwright – violin (3, 7, 9)
- Shigeru Logan – violin (3, 7, 9)
- Stephanie Matthews – violin (3, 7, 9)
- Stephanie Yu – violin (3, 7, 9)
- Susan Chatman – violin (3, 7, 9)
- Lindgren – additional vocals (4, 5); programming (4); bass guitar, drum programming, guitar, keyboards (5)
- Mr. Franks – bass guitar, drum programming, keyboards, percussion (4)
- Ryan Tedder – guitar (4)
- Melanie Fontana – additional vocals (5)
- Natalie Imani – background vocals (5–7, 9)
- Karyn Porter – background vocals (5, 9)
- Ian Hendrick-Smith – baritone saxophone (5, 6, 10)
- Di Genius –bass guitar (5, 6), drum programming (5), guitar (5, 6), keyboards (5, 6), additional vocals (6), drums (6), programming (6)
- Neal Sugarman – tenor saxophone (5, 6, 10)
- Dave Guy – trumpet (5, 6, 10)
- Ayana George – background vocals (6, 7)
- SheNice Johnson – background vocals (6, 7)
- Murda Beatz – drums (7), synthesizer programming (7)
- Munyungo Jackson – percussion (7)
- Mr Hudson – piano (7)
- Matthew Jones – string arrangement (7, 9)
- Gregg Wattenberg – bass guitar, guitar, string arrangement (8)
- Dave Eggar – cello, orchestra leader (8)
- Sterling Campbell – drums (8)
- Mia Wattenberg – piano (8)
- Chuck Palmer – string arrangement (8)
- Jessica Ryou – violin (8)
- Grant Pittman – Hammond B3 (9, 11)
- Roy Cotton II – Hammond B3 (9, 11)
- Johnnie Newman – piano (9)
- Justin Raisen – synthesizer programming (9)
- Gian Stone – bass guitar (11)
- Harper James – guitar (11)

Technical

- Dave Kutch – mastering
- Serban Ghenea – mixing
- Tim McClain – engineering
- Samantha Rosen – engineering (1, 2)
- Joshua Keith – engineering (1, 12)
- Doug Sarrett – engineering (2, 11)
- Patrick Curry – engineering (3, 7, 9)
- Rich Rich – engineering (3, 4, 10)
- Andrew Keller – engineering (4)
- Neal Shaw – engineering (5, 6, 10)
- Di Genius – engineering (6)
- Cole Lumpkin – engineering (8)
- Matt Smile – engineering (8)
- Justin Raisen – engineering (9)
- Bryce Bordone – mix engineering
- Kevin Peterson – mastering assistance
- Alisse Laymac – engineering assistance (2, 3, 5, 7, 8, 10)
- Peter Hanaman – engineering assistance (2, 3, 5, 7, 8, 10)
- Jeff Gunnel – engineering assistance (2)
- Matthew Sllivan – engineering assistance (3, 5, 6, 10)
- Ainjel Emme – additional engineering (9)
- Anthony Paul Lopez – additional engineering (9)

== Charts ==
Chart performance for Legend
Chart (2022)	Peak position
Belgian Albums (Ultratop Flanders)	113
French Albums (SNEP)	185
Swiss Albums (Schweizer Hitparade)	39
US Billboard 200	59
US Top R&B/Hip-Hop Albums (Billboard)	32

== Release history ==
Release history for Legend
Region	Date	Format(s)	Label	Ref.
Various	September 9, 2022	CD; LP; digital download; streaming	John Legend; Republic	
