= FreeSol =

Band from Memphis, Tennessee

- Genres: Hip hop, neo soul, pop rock
- Years active: 2009 - present
- Labels: Tennman Records, Interscope
- Members: Free; Premo D’Anger; Kickman Teddy; Elliott "E" Ives; DJ Charlie White

FreeSol is an alternative soul band from Memphis, Tennessee.

== History ==
The name, “FreeSol”, refers to a state of mind - a freedom of expression - with a main objective of never conforming to the usual way of doing things. Armed with this philosophy, FreeSol toured the country playing gigs of all sizes, and competing (i.e., the Mid-South Grammy Showcase, Turner South's My South Rocks competition, The Rock Boat's Grand Championship show, and the BMI Urban Music Showcase).

The band was formed in 2003 when the lead singer/MC, Free first met Premo D'Anger (keys/bass), Kickman Teddy (drums) and a month after Elliott Ives (guitar/vocals) in a studio. Growing up surrounded by the musical landscape embedded in Memphis’ history, all four of them were influenced by a variety of sounds, from blues to rock to hip-hop and back again. Their influences range from Three 6 Mafia to Isaac Hayes but they also like Outkast, Coldplay, Foo Fighters among others.

In 2004, the band released its first album 11:11 which was produced by Carlos "6 July" Broady through Memphis Records.

In 2006, Justin Timberlake, also a Memphis native, saw FreeSol perform at a little jazz cafe in their hometown. Shortly thereafter, he signed them to his upstart label, Tennman Records. Justin Timberlake was soon able to secure them a major deal with Interscope Records. In 2009, DJ Charlie White joined the group.

FreeSol worked with Cool & Dre (Lil’ Wayne, The Game), Jim Jonsin (Beyoncé, Pitbull), Mike Elizondo (Dr. Dre, Eminem), Dave Tozer (Jay-Z, Kanye West), and Timbaland in order to record their debut album No Rules. The album is scheduled for release in October 2011.

In August 2011, the music video for the single "Hoodies On, Hats Low" was released. It was directed by Justin Timberlake who also makes a cameo, Aaron Platt and Joe Toman.

The song "Don't Give It Away" was used in the end credits of the Entourage episode "Bottoms Up". Manager Nick Shuly told a video for the song is in the works.

In October 2011, a music video for the song "Role Model" featuring Justin Timberlake was released. In addition, the track "Fascinated" which features Timberlake and Timbaland also dropped the same day.

== Band members ==
- Free – lead singer, lyricist
- Elliott Ives – guitar, vocals
- Premo D'Anger – keyboards, bass guitar
- Kickman Teddy – drums
- Charlie White - DJ

== Discography ==
- 11:11 (Album) (2004)
- MasterPiece: A Rize 2 Da Top (Mixtape) (2009)
- RocknRolla' (Mixtape) (2010)
- No Rules (2012)
