= Stereo (John Legend song) =

Single by John Legend

from the album Once Again
- Released: April 27, 2007; 13 October 2007 (UK)
- Length: 4:19
- Label: GOOD; Sony Music
- Songwriter(s): John Stephens; Tom Craskey; Devon Harris
- Producer(s): Devo Springsteen; Tom Craskey (co.)

John Legend singles chronology
"P.D.A. (We Just Don't Care)" (2007)	"Stereo" (2007)	"Green Light" (2008)

"Stereo" is a song by American singer John Legend. It was written by Legend, Tom Craskey, and Devon "Springsteen" Harris for his second album, Once Again (2006), while production was overseen by Harris and co-producer Craskey. The song was released as the album's fourth single on April 27, 2007 in the United States. In the United Kingdom, "Stereo" was issued as a download only single on October 13, 2007. It reached number 17 on the Dutch Top 40 and peaked at number 47 on the Billboard Hot R&B/Hip-Hop Songs.

== Music video ==
The song's music video features Legend driving in a desert, interspersed with animated scenes interpreting the lyrics and Legend performing the song against an orange background. While producing the music video, he met his now-wife Chrissy Teigen.

== Track listing ==
UK Digital download

1. "Stereo"
2. "Stereo" (live from The Royal Albert Hall)

== Personnel ==
Credits adapted from the liner notes of Once Again.

- Produced by Devo Springsteen
- Co-Produced by Tom Craskey
- Recorded by Anthony "Rocky" Gallo at The Cutting Room and Joshua Sadlier-Brown at Integrated Studios, NYC
- Additional Engineering: Evan Conquest
- Mixed by Tony Maserati at Chung King Studios
- Mix Assistant: Andy Marcinkowski
- Vocals: John Legend
- Bass, Piano, Guitar and Additional Vocals: Tom Craskey
- Additional Guitar: Evan Conquest
- Organ: Chris Rob
- Drums: Swiss Chris

== Charts ==
=== Weekly charts ===
Chart (2007)	Peak position
Netherlands (Dutch Top 40)	17
Netherlands (Single Top 100)	52
US Hot R&B/Hip-Hop Songs (Billboard)	47

=== Year-end charts ===
Chart (2007)	Position
Netherlands (Dutch Top 40)	84
