= Live from Philadelphia (John Legend album) =

Live album by John Legend
- Released: June 3, 2008
- Recorded: 2007–08
- Genre: Soul; funk
- Length: 1:18:09
- Label: GOOD; Columbia
- Producer: Christian Lamb

John Legend chronology
| Once Again (2006) | Live from Philadelphia (2008) | Evolver (2008) |

Professional ratings
Review scores
| Source | Rating |
|---|---|
| AllMusic | 3/5 stars |

Live from Philadelphia is the fourth live album by American singer and songwriter John Legend.

== Track listing ==
1. "Do U Wanna Ride"
2. "Heaven"
3. "Stereo"
4. "Let's Get Lifted"
5. "Alright"
6. "Number One"
7. "Save Room"
8. "Where Is the Love"
9. "I Can Change"
10. "I Want You (She's So Heavy)"
11. "Slow Dance"
12. "Dance to the Music"
13. "Again"
14. "P.D.A. (We Just Don't Care)"
15. "Feel Like Makin' Love Medley"
16. "Used to Love U"
17. "Ordinary People"
18. "Coming Home"
19. "Show Me" (Encore)
20. "So High" (Encore)

== Charts ==
=== Weekly charts ===
| Chart (2008) | Peak position |
|---|---|
| Dutch Albums (Album Top 100) | 44 |
| French Albums (SNEP) | 187 |
| US Billboard 200 | 7 |
| US Top R&B/Hip-Hop Albums (Billboard) | 4 |

=== Year-end charts ===
| Chart (2008) | Position |
|---|---|
| US Top R&B/Hip-Hop Albums (Billboard) | 61 |

== Certifications ==
| Region | Certification | Certified units/sales |
|---|---|---|
| United States (RIAA) Video certification | Gold | 50,000^{^} |
^{^} Shipments figures based on certification alone.
