= Once Again (John Legend album) =

Studio album by John Legend
- Released: October 24, 2006
- Recorded: 2005–2006
- Genres: R&B; neo soul
- Length: 59:13
- Labels: GOOD; Columbia; Sony Urban
- Producers: Kanye West (also exec.); John Legend (also exec.); Dave Tozer; will.i.am; Raphael Saadiq; Craig Street; Sa-Ra; Eric Hudson; Devo Springsteen; Avenue

John Legend chronology
| Get Lifted (2004) | Once Again (2006) | Evolver (2008) |

Singles from Once Again
- 1. "Save Room" Released: August 8, 2006; 2. "Heaven" Released: December 2006; 3. "Another Again" Released: January 9, 2007; 4. "Slow Dance" Released: 2007; 5. "P.D.A. (We Just Don't Care)" Released: February 27, 2007; 6. "Stereo" Released: April 27, 2007; 7. "Show Me" Released: December 2007

Once Again is the second studio album by American singer John Legend, released by GOOD Music, Sony Urban Music and Columbia Records on October 24, 2006. Legend co-wrote and co-produced the bulk of the album, working with collaborators such as Kanye West, will.i.am, Raphael Saadiq, Craig Street, Sa-Ra, Eric Hudson, Devo Springsteen, Dave Tozer and Avenue.

Singles from the album include "Save Room", "Heaven", "P.D.A. (We Just Don't Care)", "Stereo", "Another Again", "Slow Dance", "Show Me" and "Each Day Gets Better". Once Again has been certified platinum by the RIAA, after shipping over one million copies. The song "Heaven" won the Grammy Award for Best Male R&B Vocal Performance. Also, "Save Room" was nominated for Best Male Pop Vocal Performance.

== Reception ==
Professional ratings
Aggregate scores
| Source | Rating |
|---|---|
| Metacritic | 77/100 |
Review scores
| Source | Rating |
| About.com | 4.5/5 stars |
| AllMusic | 4/5 stars |
| Entertainment Weekly | B |
| The Guardian | 4/5 stars |
| Los Angeles Times | 3.5/4 stars |
| Robert Christgau | (1-star Honorable Mention) |
| Rolling Stone | 3.5/5 stars |
| Spin | 8/10 |
| The Times | 3/5 stars |
| USA Today | 4/4 stars |

The album so far has a score of 77 out of 100 from Metacritic based on "generally favorable reviews". Yahoo! Music UK gave it a score of nine stars out of ten and called it "frequently staggering". Paste gave it four-and-a-half stars out of five and said, "Legend has grown by leaps on this disc, delivering a richer sound and more adventurous experimentation." The A.V. Club gave it a B+ and said that "While [the album] occasionally slips from understated to sleepy, there isn't a bum track on the album." Mojo also gave the album four stars out of five and said of Legend, "His most impressive skill is echoing the laid-back charm of Bill Withers and the melodic instincts of Stevie Wonder." Blender likewise gave it four stars out of five and said it "sets out to rebuild the dramatic storytelling and redemptive power of soul music on a hip-hop foundation." Q likewise gave it four stars, calling it "soulful" and "not funky". Billboard gave it a positive review and called it "A timeless, feel-good album that could easily slide into your papa's Sam Cooke and Percy Sledge collections, yet still sounds contemporary." The Village Voice also gave it a positive review and stated, "There are a number of words to describe contemporary mainstream r&b, but "elegant," "mature," "breezy," and "sophisticated" aren't usually among them. Luckily, they apply to John Legend's subtle follow-up to 2005's Grammy-winning, multiplatinum Get Lifted." Hartford Courant likewise gave it a positive review and called its songs "Soul music impeccably poised between past and future, anchored by a warm voice comfortingly similar to Bill Withers'."

Other reviews are average or mixed: The Observer gave it three stars out of five and said that Legend "has stepped up into territory that references his background in gospel and soul but avoids the more obvious nods to the past." Slant Magazine also gave it three stars and said that the album's midsection "bulges with excess MOR fat, but unlike Legend's debut, the album doesn't resurrect itself by the end." Now likewise gave it three stars and said, "Legend's lounge-track sentimentality often spills into schmaltzed-out Streisand-on-Broadway territory." Prefix Magazine gave it a score of five out of ten and stated that "The album's second half is still woefully lacking, one big mess of boredom and monotony." Vibe gave it two-and-a-half stars out of five and called it "frustratingly uneven". The Independent gave it two stars out of five and stated, "It's hard not to feel underwhelmed by this follow-up to Legend's major-label debut Get Lifted, which secured three million sales through a judicious blend of his gospel roots and hip-hop ties. The lunge for the mainstream is too pronounced, and probably ill-advised, inasmuch as it places him in direct comparison with more expressive, adept singers."

== Commercial performance ==
Once Again debuted at number three on the US Billboard 200 behind the soundtrack to Disney's Hannah Montana and My Chemical Romance's The Black Parade, selling 231,000 copies in its first week. This became Legend's second US top-ten debut and his highest-charting album. In its second week, the album dropped to the number four on the chart, selling an additional 115,000 copies. On December 5, 2006, the album was certified platinum by the Recording Industry Association of America (RIAA) for shipments of over one million units in the United States. As of September 2007, the album has sold over 2.5 million copies worldwide.

== Track listing ==
Once Again – Standard edition
| No. | Title | Writer(s) | Producer(s) | Length |
|---|---|---|---|---|
| 1. | "Save Room" | John Stephens; William Adams; Jessyca Wilson; Buddy Buie; James B. Cobb, Jr. | will.i.am; John Legend; Kanye West | 3:55 |
| 2. | "Heaven" | Stephens; West; Vaughn Stevens; Alexandra Brown; J. Wilson; Milton Bland | West; Legend^{[a]} | 3:34 |
| 3. | "Stereo" | Stephens; Tom Craskey; DeVon Harris | Devo Springsteen; Craskey^{[a]} | 4:09 |
| 4. | "Show Me" | Stephens; Rob Bacon; Raphael Saadiq; Estelle Swaray | Saadiq; Jake and the Phatman^{[a]}; Craig Street^{[b]}; Legend^{[b]} | 4:58 |
| 5. | "Each Day Gets Better" | Stephens; Adams; Pam Sawyer; Frank Wilson | will.i.am; Legend | 3:47 |
| 6. | "P.D.A. (We Just Don't Care)" | Stephens; Eric Hudson; Kawan Prather; J. Wilson | Jack Splash; Hudson; Street^{[a]}; Legend^{[a]} | 4:38 |
| 7. | "Slow Dance" | Stephens; Adams; Swaray; Mike Lewis; Poindexter | will.i.am; Legend | 4:43 |
| 8. | "Again" | Stephens | Street; Legend | 5:01 |
| 9. | "Maxine" | Stephens; Om'Mas Keith; Taz Arnold; Shafiq Husayn | Sa-Ra; Legend^{[a]} | 4:27 |
| 10. | "Where Did My Baby Go" | Stephens | Street; Legend | 5:03 |
| 11. | "Maxine's Interlude" | Stephens; Dave Tozer | Tozer | 1:50 |
| 12. | "Another Again" | Stephens; West; J. Wilson; George Patterson | West; Ken Lewis; Legend; Street^{[b]} | 4:01 |
| 13. | "Coming Home" | Stephens; Adams | will.i.am; Legend; Street^{[b]} | 5:05 |

International bonus tracks
| No. | Title | Writer(s) | Producer(s) | Length |
|---|---|---|---|---|
| 13. | "King & Queen" (featuring Mary J. Blige) | Stephens; Stevie Wonder; Paul Bollenback; Avriele Crandle | Crandle; Legend^{[a]} | 3:47 |
| 14. | "Out of Sight" | Stephens; Craskey; Vaughn Stevens; J. Wilson | Legend; Craskey | 4:13 |
| 15. | "Don't Let Me Be Misunderstood" | Bennie Benjamin; Gloria Caldwell; Sol Marcus | Legend | 5:13 |

Notes

- ^{^a} signifies co-producer
- ^{^b} signifies additional producer

== Personnel ==
Credits adapted from album's liner notes.

- Chris Allen – assistant engineer (track 8)
- Sasha Allen – background vocals (tracks 1, 6, 13)
- Cooper Anderson – engineer (track 12)
- Vaughn Anthony – background vocals (track 2)
- Taz Arnold – producer, engineer, and instruments (track 9)
- Rob Bacon – guitar (track 4)
- Stephen Barber – string arrangements (tracks 4, 10, 13)
- Art Baron – trombone (track 6)
- Mark Biondi – drums (track 11)
- Doyle Bramhall – guitar (tracks 6, 8, 13)
- Chris Bruce – guitar (tracks 6, 12)
- Steve Bruner – bass (track 9)
- Chuck Brungardt – engineer (track 4)
- Helen Campo – alto flute (track 13)
- Hector Castillo – engineer (tracks 8, 10, 12, 13), strings engineer (4)
- Evan Conquest additional guitar and additional engineering (track 3)
- Nick Cords – viola (tracks 4, 10, 13)
- Tom Craskey – co-producer, guitar, piano, and additional vocals (track 3); bass (3, 11)
- Karesha Crawford – horns (tracks 1, 5, 7)
- Andrew Dawson – engineer (track 2)
- Jenaee Dixon – horns (tracks 1, 5, 7)
- Ethan Donaldson – assistant engineer (track 10)
- Karen Dreyfus – viola (tracks 4, 13)
- Elizabeth Dyson – cello (tracks 4, 10, 13)
- Larry Eagle – drums (track 10)
- Ron Fair – piano (track 5)
- Andrea Fisher – flute (track 12)
- Katherine Fong – violin (tracks 4, 6)
- Jason Freeman – horns (track 6)
- Jerry Freeman – horns (track 6)
- Anthony "Rocky" Gallo – engineer (tracks 1, 3, 5, 7, 11, 13)
- Tom Gloady – assistant engineer (track 10)
- Diva Goodfriend – alto flute (track 13)
- Didi Gutman – keyboards (tracks 4, 6)
- Michael Harmon – engineer (track 11)
- Keith Harris – keyboards (track 13)
- Earl Harvin – drums (tracks 4, 6, 8, 13)
- Sharif Hobley – guitar (tracks 1, 2, 5, 7, 13)
- Corey Hogan – horns (tracks 1, 5, 7)
- S. Husky Höskulds – engineer (tracks 4, 6, 8, 10, 12, 13)
- Eric Hudson – producer, bass, and piano (track 6)
- Shafiq Husayn – producer, engineer, and instruments (track 9)
- Chris Jennings – assistant engineer (track 10)
- Hyomin Kang – assistant engineer (track 10)
- Mindy Kaufman – alto flute (track 13)
- Om'Mas Keith – producer, engineer, and instruments (track 9)
- Ryan Kennedy – mixing assistant (track 13)
- Padraic Kerin – engineer (tracks 1, 5, 7, 13)
- Anthony Kilhoffer – engineer (tracks 1, 2, 5, 7, 9, 10, 13)
- Lisa Kim – violin (tracks 4, 6, 13)
- Josh Kramer-Burkhart – assistant engineer (track 10)
- Soo Hyun Kwon – violin (tracks 4, 6, 13)
- Gelly Kusuma – assistant engineer (tracks 1, 5, 7, 9, 10, 13)
- Krystof Kuznik – violin (tracks 4, 6)
- Julie Landsman – French horn (track 13)
- Jeanne Leblanc – cello (tracks 4, 13)
- John Legend – lead vocals (all tracks), backing vocals (tracks 1–9, 11–13), piano (5, 7–10, 12, 13), organ (2), additional keyboards (1), producer (1, 5, 7, 8, 10, 13), co-producer (2, 6, 9, 12), additional production (4), vocal producer and arranger (11)
- Ken Lewis – co-producer and engineer (track 12)
- Kuan Lu – violin (tracks 4, 6)
- Daniele Luppi – string arrangements (track 6), additional string arrangements (4)
- Andy Marcinkowski – mixing assistant (tracks 1–3, 5–7, 9, 11)
- Tony Maserati – mixing (all tracks), engineer (track 12)
- Harvey Mason – drums (track 4)
- Tara Michel – background vocals (tracks 5, 7, 13)
- Bill Mims – assistant engineer (tracks 4, 6, 8, 10, 12, 13)
- Dror Mohar – assistant engineer (track 10)
- Jamie Muhoberac – keyboards (tracks 6, 8, 12)
- Ichiho Nishiki – mixing assistant (tracks 4, 8, 10, 12)
- Sarah O’Boyle – violin (tracks 4, 6)
- Richard Owens – horns (track 6)
- Bobby Ozuna – co-producer and drums (track 4)
- George Pajon Jr. – guitar (track 13)
- Sandra Park – violin and concertmaster(tracks 4, 6, 10, 13)
- David Piltch – bass (tracks 6, 8, 10, 13)
- Herb Powers Jr. – mastering
- Wen Qian – violin (tracks 4, 6)
- Lenesha Randolph – background vocals (track 13)
- Chris Rob – organ (track 3)
- Raphael Saadiq – producer, guitar, and bass (track 4)
- Joshua Sadlier-Brown – engineer (track 3)
- Tatsuya Sato – engineer (tracks 6, 12)
- Jack Splash – producer and drum programming (track 6)
- Devo Springsteen – producer (track 3)
- Glenn Standridge – co-producer and engineer (track 4)
- Charlie Stavish – assistant engineer (track 10)
- Craig Street – producer (tracks 8, 10), co-producer (6), additional production (4, 12, 13)
- Swiss Chris – drums (tracks 1, 3)
- Caterina Szepes – violin (tracks 4, 6)
- James Tanksley – assistant engineer (track 4)
- Steve Tirpak – trumpet and flugabone (track 11)
- David Torn – guitar (tracks 4, 6, 8, 12)
- Dave Tozer – producer, engineer, acoustic guitar, piano, and drum programming (track 11)
- Alex Venguer – assistant engineer (track 10)
- Patrick Warren – keyboards (tracks 6, 8, 12)
- Kanye West – producer (tracks 2, 12)
- will.i.am – producer and engineer (tracks 1, 5, 7, 13), drums (1, 5, 7), bass (7), drum programming (13)
- Kebbi Williams – horns (track 6)
- Steve Williamson – clarinet (track 13)
- Jessyca Wilson – background vocals (tracks 1, 2, 5–7, 9, 11–13), ad-lib vocals (7)
- Mateuz Wolski – violin (tracks 4, 6)
- Shelly Woodworth – oboe (track 13)
- Sharon Yamada – violin (tracks 4, 6, 10, 13)
- Jung Sun Yoo – violin (tracks 4, 6)
- Quincy S. Jackson – marketing

== Charts ==
=== Weekly charts ===
| Chart (2006) | Peak position |
|---|---|
| Australian Albums (ARIA) | 56 |
| Austrian Albums (Ö3 Austria) | 74 |
| Belgian Albums (Ultratop Flanders) | 38 |
| Danish Albums (Hitlisten) | 21 |
| Dutch Albums (Album Top 100) | 2 |
| Finnish Albums (Suomen virallinen lista) | 28 |
| French Albums (SNEP) | 58 |
| German Albums (Offizielle Top 100) | 33 |
| Italian Albums (FIMI) | 5 |
| Irish Albums (IRMA) | 19 |
| New Zealand Albums (RMNZ) | 36 |
| Norwegian Albums (VG-lista) | 12 |
| Scottish Albums (Official Charts) | 18 |
| Swedish Albums (Sverigetopplistan) | 8 |
| Swiss Albums (Schweizer Hitparade) | 12 |
| UK Albums (Official Charts) | 10 |
| UK Album Downloads (Official Charts) | 4 |
| UK R&B Albums (Official Charts) | 1 |
| US Billboard 200 | 3 |
| US Top R&B/Hip-Hop Albums (Billboard) | 1 |

=== Year-end charts ===
| Chart (2006) | Position |
|---|---|
| Dutch Albums (Album Top 100) | 23 |
| US Billboard 200 | 153 |
| US Top R&B/Hip-Hop Albums (Billboard) | 48 |

| Chart (2007) | Position |
|---|---|
| Dutch Albums (Album Top 100) | 73 |
| US Billboard 200 | 70 |
| US Top R&B/Hip-Hop Albums (Billboard) | 26 |

== Certifications ==
| Region | Certification | Certified units/sales |
|---|---|---|
| Canada (Music Canada) | Gold | 50,000^{^} |
| Ireland (IRMA) | Gold | 7,500^{^} |
| Netherlands (NVPI) | Platinum | 70,000^{^} |
| United Kingdom (BPI) | Gold | 100,000^{^} |
| United States (RIAA) | Platinum | 1,000,000^{^} |
^{^} Shipments figures based on certification alone.
