= Jingle Jangle: A Christmas Journey (soundtrack) =

2020 soundtrack albums

Jingle Jangle: A Christmas Journey (Music from the Netflix Original Film)

Soundtrack album by Various artists
- Released: November 13, 2020
- Genres: Pop; dance; Christmas music
- Length: 34:09
- Labels: Atlantic; Maisie Music Publishing
- Producers: John Legend; Philip Lawrence; Davy Nathan; Michael Diskint; Harvey Mason Jr. (exec.)

Singles from Jingle Jangle: A Christmas Journey (Music from the Netflix Original Film)
- 1. "This Day" Released: October 7, 2020

Jingle Jangle: A Christmas Journey (Score from the Netflix Original Film)

Film score by John Debney
- Released: December 4, 2020
- Studios: Air Lyndhurst Studios, London
- Genre: Film score
- Length: 53:24
- Label: Lakeshore
- Producer: John Debney

John Debney chronology
I Still Believe (2020)	Jingle Jangle: A Christmas Journey (2020)	Come Away (2020)

Jingle Jangle: A Christmas Journey (Music from the Netflix Original Film) is the soundtrack album to the 2020 film Jingle Jangle: A Christmas Journey, released by Atlantic Records and Maisie Music Publishing on November 13, 2020. The album features original music with contribution from John Legend, Philip Lawrence, Davy Nathan and Michael Diskint, and songs performed by the cast members, Forest Whitaker, Keegan-Michael Key, Anika Noni Rose, Ricky Martin, Justin Cornwell and Madalen Mills. The film score is written and composed by John Debney, which was released into a separate album, Jingle Jangle: A Christmas Journey (Score from the Netflix Original Film) by Lakeshore Records on December 4, 2020.

== Development ==
John Debney heard about the film, through the music supervisor Julia Michaels, and contacted David E. Talbert several times about the film, in turn he received the film's script, which he liked it and mentioned it as "heart-touching"; he had sent several demos to Talbert while filming. On working with Talbert, he said "He wanted me to dream big and go for the most amazing score that I could [...] When you're given that kind of opportunity and that kind of palette, it opens the floodgates to creativity. I honestly felt it my duty, my job, to create something that would be really special, like I always do."

"We want to honor all of the culture of these characters. It wasn't just Victorian England. It was Victorian England with African-inspired costuming and hairstyling. Just like Black Panther (2018) was an incredibly important film for many reasons, culturally, this to me is also that. And I honored that and that opened the floodgates for me to write the adventure theme. It's for humanity, it's for everyone."

— John Debney, on the culturally-rich music created for Jingle Jangle.

Debney wanted the score to be "classic, timeless and at times magical, big and adventurous", which led him to work with a huge orchestra for the music. He initially did not want Christmas music or typical holiday film music, but create the score cue from the melodies of the songs featured, that would capture the soulfulness of Christmas. The orchestra ensemble consisted of nearly 90 musicians, which include strings, woodwinds, brass, horns and percussions, as well as gospel choir and gospel soloists. Debney wanted the music to have "sounds, textures and instrumental colors that would make it a little different".

Much of the film's music were written by late-2019. However, due to the COVID-19 pandemic lockdown restrictions all over the world in March 2020, recording of the score had to be supervised remotely with Zoom meetings. Debney had further managed to record the score with limitations, where each orchestral portions had to be recorded per day. Despite being challenging to record during the pandemic time, Debney pleased with "how the music sounds".

Talbert hired songwriters John Legend and Philip Lawrence to write the original songs, with Davy Nathan and Michael Diskint also contributing, and Harvey Mason Jr. served as the executive producer. Legend wrote the promotional song "This Day" for the film, felt that "We felt like we could add a lot to it when it came to music and our connections in this industry. But the idea that we could present a different vision for what a holiday film is like, what a kid's film is like, we were excited to do that [...] David has a great musical ear himself as a writer/director," Legend says. "He's worked in musical theater before and so he has a good sense of what music is supposed to do to the drama of the story. Working with him was a true joy, a true pleasure. We truly are proud of the whole musical team."

== Promotions ==
The lead single for the album include: "This Day" performed by Usher and Kiana Ledé, released on October 7, 2020. Usher also asked fans to perform the song on TikTok, and also produced a 'Global Behind the Mic' version performed by the international voiceover cast from the film in different languages, to promote the single. A special music video and remix recorded version of "Square Root of Possible" is performed by America's Got Talent's finalists, The Ndlovu Youth Choir of South Africa. Netflix uploaded the cover to their official YouTube channel for Africa, "AfricaonNetflix" on November 25, 2020.

== Track listing ==
=== Soundtrack ===
No.	Title	Writer(s)	Performer(s)	Length
1.	"This Day"	John Legend; Philip Lawrence; Davy Nathan	Justin Cornwell; Sharon Rose	3:33
2.	"Borrow Indefinitely"	Lawrence; Nathan	Ricky Martin	1:48
3.	"Miles and Miles"	Michael Diskint; Lawrence; Nathan	Marisha Wallace	2:33
4.	"Not The Only One"	Lawrence; Nathan; Diskint	Madalen Mills	2:00
5.	"Magic Man G"	Diskint; Lawrence; Nathan	Keegan-Michael Key	3:32
6.	"Square Root of Possible"	Diskint; Lawrence; Nathan	Mills	4:04
7.	"Over and Over"	Diskint; Lawrence; Nathan; Jean-Yves Ducornet	Forest Whitaker	3:07
8.	"Grandpa Me Nie' (Asew Jingle Jangle Remix)"	Ronald Appiah	Bisa Kdei; Mic Flammez	1:41
9.	"Make It Work"	John Stephens	Whitaker; Anika Noni Rose	3:50
10.	"This Day (Reprise)"	Legend; Lawrence; Nathan	Jingle Jangle Choir	2:54
11.	"This Day (End Credits)"	Legend; Lawrence; Nathan	Usher; Kiana Ledé	3:48
12.	"Jingle Jangle Score Suite"	John Debney	Debney	3:47
Total length:				36:38

=== Score ===
No.	Title	Length
1.	"By the Fire with Grandma / Jangle's and Things"	4:11
2.	"Jeronicus Workshop"	1:19
3.	"Don Juan Comes To Life"	1:04
4.	"Don Juan Meets The Family"	1:31
5.	"Don Turns Gus To The Darkside"	1:37
6.	"Borrowed Indefinitely, Pt. 2"	0:28
7.	"Betrayed / Time Passes"	3:02
8.	"Ms. Johnston"	1:41
9.	"Hello Buddy"	1:39
10.	"Journey Travels To Grandfather"	1:30
11.	"Jessica's Picture"	1:40
12.	"Goodnight Journey / Storybook Interlude"	1:46
13.	"Journey Shows Her Gifts"	2:48
14.	"Flying With Buddy"	7:31
15.	"Buddy's Been Taken"	1:49
16.	"Once An Apprentice"	1:41
17.	"The Crusher (With Choir)"	1:41
18.	"Air Shaft Adventure"	5:06
19.	"Real Inventor"	1:20
20.	"Kiss For Ms. Johnston"	2:00
21.	"Why I Came"	1:48
22.	"I Love You So Much"	3:59
23.	"The Real Thief Revealed"	2:13
Total length:		53:24

== Reception ==
The review from Soundtrack Beat, commented "Timeless, magical, rich and adventurous, the soundtrack of the movie "Jingle Jangle: A Christmas Journey" is a very satisfactory sample of how skillful a composer can be when he sets to doing music for a musical, where songs are usually the only focus and he has to cover the musical gaps of the story. Rich in melodies and feelings and exceptional as an approach and performance, the music of John Debney comes to remind us the value of the music that has a personality, something that makes it memorable in the ears and eyes of the movie's viewers. Yet another soundtrack that works as a proof that John Debney is one of the best composers that write music for movies nowadays!"

Nell Minow of RogerEbert.com wrote "One of the film's producers is John Legend, which means the music is glorious, with a superb score by John Debney and fine songs from Davy Nathan and Philip Lawrence. The singing is superb, especially from Sharon Rose as Joanna Jangle, Anika Noni Rose as the adult Jessica, Cornwell as young Jangle, and Mills as Journey. Key has a lot of fun with a villain song as he tries to promote his own invention, the toy he could never quite get right." Aramide A. Tinubu of NBC News wrote "Scored by John Debney and with original music by John Legend, among others, "Jingle Jangle" hits all of the right beats that are typically found in a Christmas-themed musical. Draped in bold colors and fabrics, the characters glide and move around to songs influenced by the blues, jazz and Afrobeats. There's even a moment when Gustafson emulates James Brown's iconic cape routine, falling to his knees while a massive green fur is thrown over him."

Pete Hammond of Deadline Hollywood wrote "With a bright score from John Debney and a bevy of better-than-average Broadway-style songs from John Legend, Phillip Lawrence and Davy Nathan, there are numerous stops for big musical numbers, a couple that really stop the show." Frank Scheck of The Hollywood Reporter praised Debney's score "The energetic musical score, heavily infused with R&B but also incorporating a wide variety of musical styles including traditional Broadway-style balladry, is consistently tuneful." Reviewing for Comingsoon.net, Jeff Ames commented "the joyously uplifting orchestral score alongside the sparkling original songs elevate it as a timeless holiday classic".

== Accolades ==
"Square Root of Possible" performed by Madalen Mills, was predicted as a possible contender for nominations at the 93rd Academy Awards for Best Original Song by various entertainment news articles. Although it has been considered in the early tossup predictions, The Academy of Motion Picture Arts and Sciences announced that "Make It Work" made the shortlist for Best Original Song to be voted for a nomination. However, each musical selections that were considered, did not make it into the official Oscar nominations. Even Debney's score which was shortlisted for the Best Original Score, could not make the final nomination list.

Award wins and nominations for Jingle Jangle: A Christmas Journey
Award	Date of ceremony	Category	Recipient(s)	Result	Ref
Black Reel Awards	April 11, 2021	Outstanding Original Score	John Debney	Nominated	
Black Reel Awards	April 11, 2021	Outstanding Original Song	"Make It Work" (John Legend, Anika Noni Rose and Forest Whitaker)	Nominated	
Guild of Music Supervisors Awards	April 11, 2021	Best Music Supervision for Film (Budgeted Over $25 Million)	Julia Michaels	Nominated	
Guild of Music Supervisors Awards	April 11, 2021	Best Song Written and/or Recorded for a Film	"Make It Work" (John Legend, Julia Michaels, Anika Noni Rose and Forest Whitaker)	Nominated	
Hollywood Music in Media Awards	January 27, 2021	Best Soundtrack Album	Jingle Jangle: A Christmas Journey	Nominated	
NAACP Image Awards	March 27, 2021	Outstanding Soundtrack/Compilation Album	Various Artists, Jingle Jangle: A Christmas Journey	Nominated	
