= Show Me (John Legend song) =

Single by John Legend

from the album Once Again
- Released: December 2007
- Recorded: 2007
- Genre: R&B, jazz, blues
- Length: 4:58 (Album Version)
- Label: GOOD; Sony Music
- Songwriters: John Stephens, Rob Bacon, Raphael Saadiq and Estelle Swaray
- Producers: Raphael Saadiq and Craig Street

John Legend singles chronology
"Slow Dance" (2007)	"Show Me" (2007)	"Each Day Gets Better" (2008)

"Show Me" is the seventh single from John Legend's album, Once Again. The song is produced by Raphael Saadiq and Craig Street and was released as a single in December 2007. The song is noted for its vulnerability, and John has cited it as one of his favorites. Along with the release came a music video tailored to fit the theme of the Anti-Poverty campaign which John started shortly afterwards.

== Song Style ==
Noted as being a particularly unusual track on Once Again, Show Me opens up with a guitar riff reminiscent of Jimi Hendrix and crooning, hushed, and haunting. Its beat is smooth and its lyrics are hopeful in prayer from a skeptical believer.

== Music video ==
Directed by Lee Hirsch, the video portrays the day of a poor African child who faces difficult living condition and witnesses the relative ease of the life for a child in a higher developed country, with implications of lack of proper health care, education, public transportation, and proper agriculture. John follows him as a voyeuristic specter which the boy seems to recognize momentarily, which implies that it is in fact the spirit and willingness of those who wish to help aid as some sort of real world overlooking guardian angels. In an effort to escape the life he feels bound to, he mounts the wheel well of an airplane immediately before it ascends for flight.

The song is dedicated to Yaguine Koita and Fode Tounkara, young stowaways who died flying from Guinea to Belgium in July 1999, as well as the millions who live in poverty. It was shot in Zanzibar and Tanzania in October 2007.

== Campaign ==
In 2007, John began the Show Me Campaign to fight poverty in underdeveloped countries. He promoted awareness by touring and visiting universities and colleges across the United States. He donated funding to Millennium Promise, an organization with the stated goal of ending extreme poverty.

"The song is a prayer asking God why is there so much suffering in the world. How do you choose who gets lucky enough to be born into wealth, versus who's born into poverty and disease and things like that. It's just asking God these questions. In response, I was thinking more about the issue of poverty and what I could do. I couldn't keep questioning what was happening. Why don't we do something about it?"

— John Legend, LiveDaily interview

== Sources ==
- Conniff, Tamara; Crosley, Hillary (August 26, 2006). "Making of a Legend Part 2". Billboard magazine. 118 (34). Nielsen Business Media, Inc. ISSN 0006-2510.
