= Dave Tozer =

American record producer

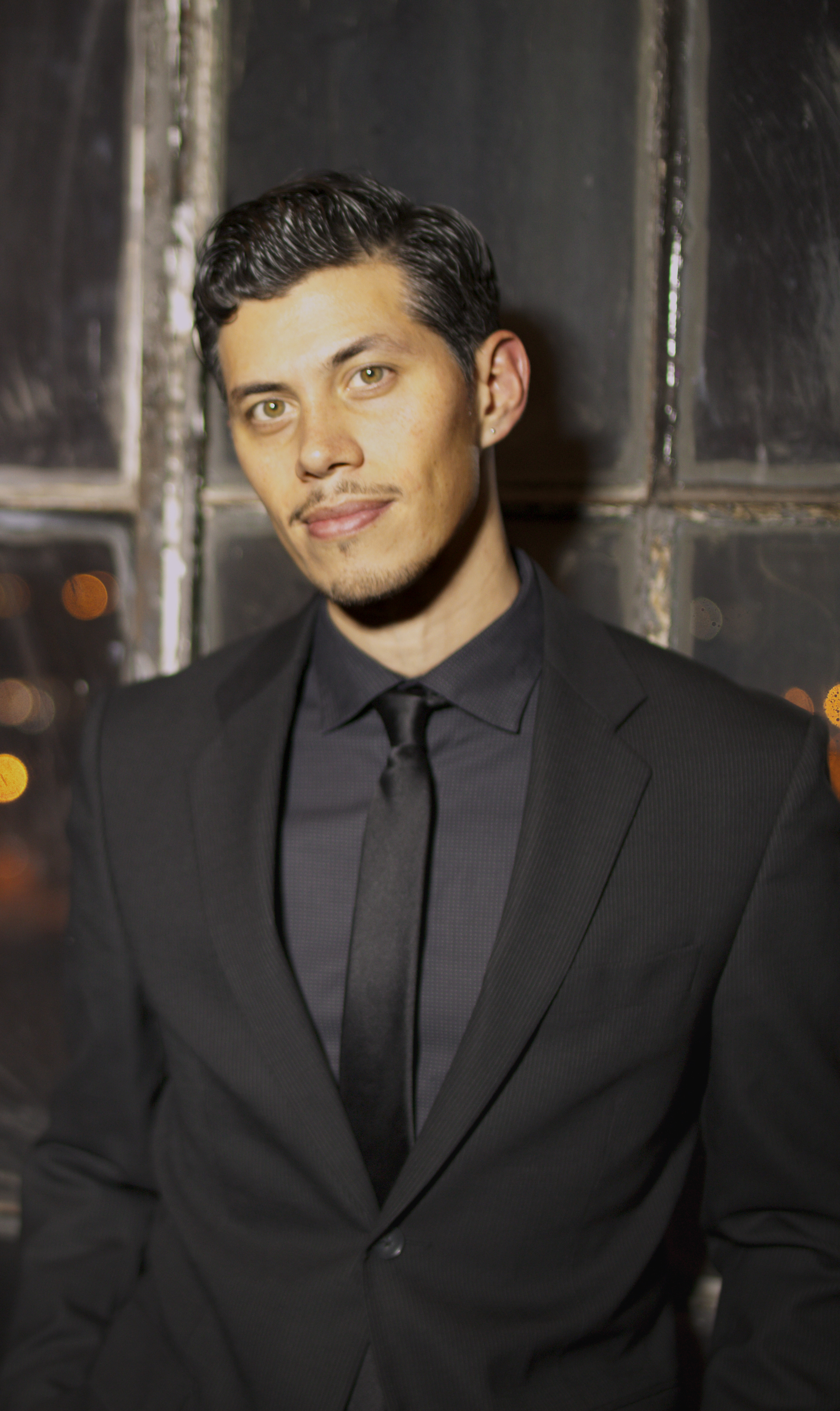

Background information
- Genres: Hip hop, R&B, Rock, Pop
- Occupations: Record producer, Songwriter, Musician
- Instruments: Guitar, Bass, Keyboards, Programming, Drum Programming

Dave Tozer is an American record producer and songwriter. He has worked with several R&B, hip-hop, rock and pop artists including John Legend, Kanye West, Jay-Z, Justin Timberlake, Bruno Mars, John Mayer, Snoop Dogg, Rick Ross, Kimbra, Natasha Bedingfield, Needtobreathe, Three 6 Mafia, Musiq Soulchild, Emeli Sande, Craig David, Chrisette Michele, Mayer Hawthorne, James Bay, Estelle, DEV and Jazmine Sullivan.

== Early life ==
Hailing from Bridgeton, New Jersey, Tozer taught himself guitar, bass and keyboard. After moving to Philadelphia in the late 1990s, Tozer honed his production skills at various Philadelphia-area studios, such as the legendary Sigma Sound Studios and began working as a freelance musician playing everything from Hip-Hop and Rock to R&B and Pop. Through Max Blumenthal, a mutual friend, Tozer met University of Pennsylvania student John Stephens (later John Legend) and began a fruitful, professional relationship. In addition to developing creatively with Legend, Tozer produced his three independently released albums: John Stephens (2000), Live at Jimmy‘s Uptown (2001) and Live at SOB's (2003).

== Musical career ==
=== 2004–2007 ===
In 2004, Tozer contributed to eight tracks on Legend‘s Grammy Award-winning major label debut Get Lifted, and his writing skills garnered him a publishing deal with Viacom-owned Famous Music Publishing. 2005 proved to be an important year for Tozer with the success of Get Lifted, which earned eight Grammy nominations and reached multi-platinum status. Legend won three awards including Best New Artist and Best R&B Album. Tozer was a producer on Get Lifted] and the track "Stay With You," which Tozer co-wrote and produced, was also nominated for Best Traditional R&B Vocal Performance.

In 2005, soon after the success of Get Lifted, Tozer was crafting songs for artists such as Heather Headley and Natasha Bedingfield. He also contributed to Kanye West's Grammy-winning single "Diamonds From Sierra Leone," and produced another Legend track for the Luther Vandross tribute album, So Amazing: An All-Star Tribute to Luther Vandross. For Tozer, the year culminated in a deal with Sony Music as an in-house producer and a renewal of his Famous Music Publishing contract.

In 2006, Tozer worked on the track "Do U Wanna Ride" from Jay-Z's comeback album Kingdom Come. Tozer also reunited with his old friend Legend and produced three songs from his acclaimed second album Once Again, including the iTunes single "On Top Of The World."

In 2007, Tozer continued to work with several different artists, including J Records recording artist Jazmine Sullivan and Mercury Records recording artist George Stanford. Along with contributing to the development of the Philadelphia-based artist, Tozer worked to get Stanford signed to Epic Records before he subsequently moved to Mercury Records.

=== 2008–2010 ===
In 2008, Tozer reunited with longtime collaborator, John Legend to co-write and produce "This Time" on Legend’s third album, Evolver. In 2009, Tozer worked with American Idol's Elliott Yamin to co-write and produce the record "Someday" on Yamin's second album, Fight for Love.

In 2010, Tozer wrote and produced "Find Me" for Musiq Soulchild and Jazmine Sullivan for Soulchild’s upcoming album. He also went on to collaborate with Justin Timberlake, co-writing and producing three songs for Timberlake's signees, Free Sol, released on their debut album, No Rules, on Timberlake’s imprint Tennman Records.

=== 2011–2015 ===
In 2011, Tozer and Legend began working together on what would become Legend's fourth studio album, Love in the Future. Tozer co-executive produced the album with Kanye West. Recording sessions for the album took place over the next two-and-a-half years. The album was released on September 3, 2013, to widespread critical acclaim, and was Grammy-nominated for R&B album of year in 2014. In addition to being one of the album's two executive producers, Tozer produced fifteen tracks, mixed twelve, and co-wrote ten songs for the album.

In 2012, Tozer teamed up with Michael Bolton to co-write and produce the Motown-inspired track, "Gotta Keep Dreamin," for Bolton's, Ain't No Mountain High Enough: A Tribute to Hitsville. Later that year, Tozer worked with Mayer Hawthorne, co-writing and producing "The Valley."

In 2013, Tozer co-wrote and produced "Painted In Tears" for X-factor runner-up and Columbia Records recording artist Rebecca Ferguson. In addition, Tozer mixed Pixie Lott's "Higher & Higher," as well as two songs for the award-winning soundtrack to 12 Years A Slave, "Move" and "Roll, Jordan, Roll." Tozer also collaborated with Warner Bros. Records recording artist Kimbra on her album, The Golden Echo, co-producing and co-writing the track "Nobody But You."

On August 12, 2013, Legend's "All of Me," which Tozer produced and mixed, impacted U.S radio as the third single from Love in the Future. The week ending May 16, 2014, "All of Me" peaked at number one on the Billboard Hot 100, becoming Legend’s first number one single in the United States. "All of Me" went on to reign the Hot 100 for two weeks and become certified eight times platinum status in the United States. The song peaked at number two in the United Kingdom and New Zealand and topped the charts in Australia, Canada, Ireland, Portugal, Sweden, Switzerland and the Netherlands.

In 2014, Tozer produced and mixed the track "Home" on Ella Eyre's Feline album.

=== 2016–present ===
In 2016, Tozer co-wrote, produced and mixed "Beautiful & Fragile" (feat. Jay Prince) for UK newcomer D/C. Tozer co-wrote two songs, and produced a significant amount of Needtobreathe's sixth LP Hard Love, which was released on July 15, 2016, and debuted at number 2 on the Billboard 200 chart. Tozer produced and mixed "All We Needed," and "Warm It Up," which he also co-wrote, on the Craig David album Following My Intuition, which was released on September 30, 2016 and debuted at number 1 on the UK Albums Chart.

On March 22, 2017, Legend released "In America." Produced and co-written by Tozer, this song was featured on the season 2 premiere of WGN’s hit show, Underground. A politically charged record that addresses issues of economic hardship and social injustice, Rolling Stone said of "In America," "‘In America’ moves deftly between a thumping verse and a sweeping chorus, building incrementally to a gospel-tinged fever pitch that tapers swiftly into a sparse, chilling end. Legend presides over the track with equal parts anger and hope."

== Philosophy ==
In an interview with David Weiss of SonicScoop, Tozer summed up his approach as a producer, stating, “Magic is what I’m after. Writing a great song, it's like you've tapped into some spirit that’s guiding you. The words flow, the dots connect, and you've created something with a mystical quality. You know that feeling when it comes. When I’m with an artist, I’m on the lookout for voodoo.”

== Discography ==
- 2016: Craig David - Following My Intuition
- 2016: Needtobreathe - Hard Love
- 2016: D/C - Badman
- 2016: Mayer Hawthorne - Man About Town
- 2015: Ella Eyre - Feline
- 2014: Kimbra - The Golden Echo
- 2013: Rebecca Ferguson - Freedom
- 2013: John Legend - "Roll Jordan Roll", "Move" featuring Fink
- 2013: John Legend - Love in the Future
- 2013: Pixie Lott - "Higher & Higher"
- 2013: Michael Bolton - Ain't No Mountain High Enough: A Tribute To Hitsville, USA
- 2010: Emile Sande - "Nothing Left To Lose"
- 2010: Musiq Soulchild - "Find Me" feat. Jazmine Sullivan
- 2010: FreeSol - "The Coolest", "Panic Attack", "Restraining Order"
- 2009: Elliott Yamin - Fight for Love
- 2008: John Legend - Evolver
- 2008: George Stanford - Big Drop
- 2008: Lizz Wright - The Orchard
- 2006: Jay-Z - Kingdom Come
- 2006: John Legend - Once Again
- 2005: Kanye West - Late Registration
- 2005: Various Artists - So Amazing: An All-Star Tribute to Luther Vandross
- 2004: John Legend - Get Lifted
- 2003: John Legend - Live at SOB's
- 2001: John Legend - Live at Jimmy's Uptown
- 2000: John Legend - John Stephens

== Selected credits ==
Year	Artist	Song title	Album	Contribution
2017	John Legend	"In America"	Single	Producer/Songwriter/Musician/Mixer
2016	Craig David	"Warm It Up"	Following My Intuition	Producer/Songwriter/Musician/Mixer
2016	Craig David	"All We Needed"	Following My Intuition	Producer/Musician/Mixer
2016	Needtobreathe	"No Excuses"	Hard Love	Producer/Musician
2016	Needtobreathe	"Let's Stay Home Tonight"	Hard Love	Producer/Musician
2016	Needtobreathe	"Money & Fame"	Hard Love	Producer/Songwriter/Musician
2016	Needtobreathe	"Great Night" feat. Shovels & Rope	Hard Love	Producer/Songwriter/Musician
2016	D/C	"Beautiful & Fragile" feat. Jay Prince	Badman EP	Producer/Songwriter/Musician/Mixer
2016	Mayer Hawthorne	"The Valley"		Producer/Songwriter/Musician
2015	Needtobreathe	"Brother"	Single	Producer/Musician
2015	Ella Eyre	"Home"	Ella Eyre	Producer/Musician/Mixer
2014	Kimbra	"Nobody But You"	The Golden Echo	Co-Producer/Songwriter/Musician
2013	John Legend	Full Album	Love in the Future	Executive Producer/Producer/Songwriter/Musician/Mixer
2013	John Legend	"Roll Jordan Roll"	12 years A Slave (Music from and Inspired By the Motion Picture)	Mixer
2013	John Legend	"Move" feat. Fink	12 years A Slave (Music from and Inspired By the Motion Picture)	Mixer
2013	Pixie Lott	"Higher & Higher"	Single	Mixer
2010	Musiq Soulchild	"Find Me" feat. Jazmine Sullivan		Producer/Songwriter/Musician
2010	Free Sol	"Panic Attack"	No Rules	Producer/Songwriter/Musician
2010	Free Sol	"The Coolest"	No Rules	Producer/Songwriter/Musician
2010	Free Sol	"Restraining Order"	No Rules	Producer/Songwriter/Musician
2009	Elliott Yamin	"Someday"	Fight for Love	Producer/Songwriter/Musician
2008	John Legend	"This Time"	Evolver	Producer/Songwriter/Musician
2008	George Stanford	"Heartbeat"	Big Drop	Producer/Songwriter/Mixer
2008	Lizz Wright	"Speak Your Heart"	The Orchard	Songwriter
2006	Jay-Z	"Do U Wanna Ride"	Kingdom Come	Instrumentalist
2006	John Legend	"Maxine’s Interlude"	Once Again	Producer/Songwriter/Musician
2006	John Legend	"On Top Of The World"	Once Again (iTunes Single)	Producer/Songwriter/Musician
2006	John Legend	"Closer To You"	Once Again (Bonus Track)	Producer/Songwriter/Musician
2005	Kanye West	"Diamonds from Sierra Leone"	Late Registration	Instrumentalist
2005	John Legend	"Love Won’t Let Me Wait"	So Amazing: An All-Star Tribute to Luther Vandross	Producer/Musician/Mixer
2004	John Legend	"Stay With You"	Get Lifted	Producer/Songwriter
2004	John Legend	"I Can Change" feat. Snoop Dogg	Get Lifted	Producer/Songwriter
2004	John Legend	"Let’s Get Lifted Again"	Get Lifted	Producer/Songwriter/Musician/Mixer
2004	John Legend	"It Don’t Have To Change" feat. The Stephens Family	Get Lifted	Songwriter
2004	John Legend	"Let’s Get Lifted"	Get Lifted	Instrumentalist
2004	John Legend	"Live It Up"	Get Lifted	Instrumentalist
2004	John Legend	"So High"	Get Lifted	Instrumentalist
2004	John Legend	"Refuge (When It’s Cold Outside)"	Get Lifted	Instrumentalist
2004	John Legend	"Johnny’s Gotta Go"	Get Lifted (International Release)	Producer/Songwriter/Musician/Mixer
2004	John Legend	"Money Blown"	Get Lifted (International Release)	Producer/Songwriter
2003	John Legend	Full Album	Live At SOB’s	Producer/Songwriter/Musician/Mixer
2001	John Legend	Full Album	Live At Jimmy’s Uptown	Producer/Songwriter/Musician/Mixer
2000	John Legend	Full Album	John Stephens	Producer/Songwriter/Musician/Mixer
