= Live at SOB's =

Live album by John Legend
- Released: June and December 2002 (USA)
- Recorded: 2002
- Genre: Soul; R&B
- Length: 44:10
- Label: John Legend Music
- Producer: Dave Tozer

John Legend chronology
Live at Jimmy's Uptown (2001)	Live at SOB's (2002)	Solo Sessions Vol. 1: Live at the Knitting Factory (2004)

Live at SOB's is a live album released by American musician John Legend. Recorded June 28 and December 6, 2002 at SOB's in New York, it was produced by longtime collaborator Dave Tozer.

== Track listing ==
1. "Set It Off" – 4:04
2. "Alright" – 3:34
3. "Lifted" – 3:58
4. "Soul Joint" – 4:02
5. "Hurts So Bad" – 5:12
6. "Sun Comes Up" – 8:00
7. "The Wrong Way" – 4:13
8. "Motherless Child" – 4:23
9. "Burning Down the House" – 2:42
10. "Without You" – 4:06
