= Heaven (John Legend song) =

Single by John Legend

from the album Once Again
- Released: December 2006
- Genre: R&B
- Length: 3:37
- Label: GOOD; Sony Music
- Songwriter(s): John Stephens; Kanye West; Alexandra Louise Brown; Jessyca Wilson; Milton Bland; Vaughn Stevens
- Producer(s): West; John Legend

John Legend singles chronology
"Save Room" (2006)	"Heaven" (2006)	"P.D.A. (We Just Don't Care)" (2007)

"Heaven" is a song by American singer John Legend. It was written by Legend along with label boss Kanye West, Jessyca Wilson and his brother Vaughn Stevens for his second studio album Once Again (2006). Production was helmed by West, with Legend credited as co-producer. The song samples excerpts from "Heaven Only Knows" (1972) as performed by Monk Higgins. Due to the inclusion of the sample, Milton Bland and Alexandra Louise Brown are also credited as songwriters. The song was released as the album's second single in fall 2006.

A moderate commercial success, "Heaven" reached number 26 on US Billboard Hot R&B/Hip-Hop Songs, but failed to enter the Billboard Hot 100. Released to critical success however, it won Legend his second consecutive Grammy Award for Best Male R&B Vocal Performance at the 49th award ceremony. The song produced two music videos, the first one featuring women posed as various Renaissance era paintings. The second one features more John Legend himself and less posture women. Both videos were shot at Highclere Castle and directed by Hype Williams. The instrumental would be reused on "HEAVEN TO ME" (2023) by Tyler, The Creator.

== Track listings ==
US digital single
No.	Title	Writer(s)	Producer(s)	Length
1.	"Heaven" (Remix; featuring Pusha T)	John Legend; Kanye West; Alexandra Louise Brown; Jessyca Wilson; Milton Bland; Vaughn Stevens	West; John Legend^{[a]}	4:16
2.	"Heaven" (A Cappella; featuring Pusha T)	Legend; West; Brown; Wilson; Bland; Stevens	West; Legend^{[a]}	3:44
3.	"Heaven" (Album Version)	Legend; West; Brown; Wilson; Bland; Stevens	West; Legend^{[a]}	3:36
4.	"Heaven" (Instrumental)	Legend; West; Brown; Wilson; Bland; Stevens	West; Legend^{[a]}	4:36

Notes

- ^{^[a]} signifies a co-producer

== Personnel ==
Credits adapted from the liner notes of Once Again.

- Andrew Dawson — recording (at Sony Music Studios)
- Sharief Hobley — guitar
- Anthony Kilhoffer — recording (at Record Plant)
- John Legend — co-producer, organ, vocals, writer
- Andy Marcinkowski — mixing assistant
- Tony Maserati — mixing
- Kanye West — production, writer
- Jessyca Wilson — background vocals

== Charts ==
Chart (2006)	Peak position
US Hot R&B/Hip-Hop Songs (Billboard)	26
