= P.D.A. (We Just Don't Care) =

Single by John Legend

from the album Once Again
- Released: February 27, 2007
- Length: 4:38
- Label: GOOD; Sony Music
- Songwriter(s): John Stephens; Eric Hudson; Kawan Prather; Jessyca Wilson
- Producer(s): Eric Hudson; Jack Splash

John Legend singles chronology
"Heaven" (2006)	"P.D.A. (We Just Don't Care)" (2007)	"Stereo" (2007)

"P.D.A. (We Just Don't Care)" is a song by American singer John Legend, taken from his second studio album, Once Again (2006). It was written by Legend, Jessyca Wilson, Eric Hudson, and Kawan Prather, with production overseen by Hudson and Jack Splash. Craig Street and Legend as credited as co-producers on the song. An acronym for public display of affection, "P.D.A. (We Just Don't Care)" was released in early 2007 as the album's third single.

The song became a success in the Netherlands where it reached number 20 on both the Dutch Top 40 and the Single Top 100. An accompanying music video for the song, which was shot in Rio de Janeiro, Brazil by Australian director Nabil Elderkin, premiered on Yahoo! Music on January 29. 2007. Brazilian actor Alexandre Rodrigues appears on the music video. "P.D.A. (We Just Don't Care)" was later included on the international soundtrack of the Brazilian soap opera Paraíso Tropical, produced by Rede Globo.

== Track listings ==
CD single
No.	Title	Writer(s)	Producer(s)	Length
1.	"P.D.A. (We Just Don't Care)" (Album Version)	John Legend; Eric Hudson; Jessyca Wilson; Kawan Prather	Jack Splash; Hudson; Craig Street^{[a]}; Legend^{[a]}	4:40
2.	"Heaven" (Johnny Douglas Remix)	Legend; Kanye West; Alexandra Louise Brown; Wilson; Milton Bland; Vaughn Stevens	Kanye West; John Legend^{[a]}; Johnny Douglas^{[b]}	3:36
3.	"Heaven" (Remix featuring Pusha T)	Legend; West; Brown; Wilson; Bland; Stevens	West; Legend^{[a]}	4:16
4.	"P.D.A. (We Just Don't Care)" (Music video)			4:40

Notes

- ^{^[a]} signifies a co-producer
- ^{^[b]} signifies an additional producer

== Personnel ==
Credits adapted from the liner notes of Once Again.

- Produced by Eric Hudson and Jack Splash
- Co-produced by Craig Street and John Legend
- Recorded by Tatsuya Sato at Sony Music Studios, S. Husky Hoskulds (assisted by Bill Mims) at Sunset Sound Factory and Hector Castillo at Sear Sound, NYC and Right Track
- Mixed by Tony Maserati (assisted by Andy Marcinkowski) at Chung King Studios
- Vocals: John Legend
- Background vocals: Jessyca Wilson and Sasha Allen
- Piano: Eric Hudson
- Bass guitar: Eric Hudson and David Piltch
- Drum programming: Jack Splash
- Live drums: Earl Harvin
- Guitar: Doyle Bramhall, Chris Bruce and David Torn
- Keyboards: Patrick Warren, Jamie Muhoberac and Didi Gutman
- Horns by Jerry Freeman, Jason Freeman, Richard Owens and Kebbi Williams
- String arrangement: Daniele Luppi
- Trombone: Art Baron
- Violins: Sandra Park, Sharon Yamada, Wen Qian, Caterina Szepez, Kuan Lu, Jung Sun Yoo, Lisa Kim, Soo Hyun Kwon, Sarah O'Boyle, Mateuz Wolski, Katherine Fong and Krystof Kuznik

== Charts ==
=== Weekly charts ===
Chart (2007)	Peak position
Netherlands (Dutch Top 40)	18
Netherlands (Single Top 100)	20

=== Year-end charts ===
Chart (2007)	Position
Netherlands (Dutch Top 40)	82
Netherlands (Single Top 100)	74
