= Save Room (song) =

2006 single by John Legend

Single by John Legend

from the album Once Again
- Released: August 8, 2006
- Genre: R&B
- Length: 3:56
- Label: GOOD; Sony Music
- Songwriter(s): John Stephens; William Adams; Jessyca Wilson; Buddy Buie; James B. Cobb, Jr.
- Producer(s): Kanye West; will.i.am; John Legend

John Legend singles chronology
"Grammy Family" (2006)	"Save Room" (2006)	"Heaven" (2006)

Music video
- "Save Room" on YouTube

"Save Room" is a song by American singer John Legend, released on August 8, 2006 as the lead single from his second album, Once Again (2006). A joyful love song, it was written and produced by Legend and fellow American singer will.i.am, with additional writing and production by Jessyca Wilson and Kanye West, respectively. Its production is built upon a sample of Gábor Szabó's version of the Classics IV hit "Stormy”, written by Buddy Buie and James B. Cobb, Jr.; its usage was at the suggestion of Legend's then-label boss and manager, West. A music video was made for the song, directed by Bryan Barber.

"Save Room" became a top ten hit in Italy and the Netherlands, while peaking within the top 20 in the Flemish region of Belgium and on Billboard's US Hot R&B/Hip-Hop Songs chart. In the United Kingdom, the song received a digital only release, and chart rules at that time prevented it from entering the UK singles chart. A critical success, the song was also nominated for Best Male Pop Vocal Performance at the 49th Annual Grammy Awards.

== Track listings ==
CD Single
No.	Title	Writer(s)	Producer(s)	Length
1.	"Save Room"	John Stephens; William Adams; Jessyca Wilson; Buddy Buie; James B. Cobb, Jr.	will.i.am; John Legend; Kanye West	3:59
2.	"Out of Sight"	Stephens; Tom Craskey; Vaughn Stevens; Wilson	Legend; Craskey	4:13
3.	"Don't Let Me Be Misunderstood"	Bennie Benjamin; Gloria Caldwell; Sol Marcus	Legend	5:13
4.	"Please Baby Don't" (Sergio Mendes featuring John Legend)	Stephens; Adams	will.i.am; Legend	4:12
5.	"Ordinary People" (Johnny Douglas Radio Edit)	Stephens; Adams	Legend; Douglas^{[a]}	3:36

Notes

- ^{^[a]} signifies an additional producer

== Personnel ==
Credits adapted from the liner notes of Once Again.

- Produced by will.i.am, John Legend and Kanye West
- Recorded by will.i.am and Padraic Kerin at Spiral Recording, LA, Anthony Kilhoffer (assisted by Gelly Kusuma) at The Record Plant, LA and Anthony "Rocky" Gallo at The Cutting Room
- Vocals: John Legend
- Mixed by Tony Maserati at Chung King Studios
- Guitar: Sharief Hobley
- Live Drums: will.i.am and Swiss Chris
- Horns: Corey Hogan, Ryck Jane (Jenee Dixon) and Karesha Crawford
- Additional Keyboards: John Legend
- Background Vocals: Jessyca Wilson and Sasha Allen

== Charts ==
=== Weekly charts ===
Chart (2006)	Peak position
Belgium (Ultratip Bubbling Under Flanders)	17
Germany (GfK)	78
Italy (FIMI)	6
Netherlands (Dutch Top 40)	9
Netherlands (Single Top 100)	9
US Billboard Hot 100	61
US Adult R&B Songs (Billboard)	10
US Hot R&B/Hip-Hop Songs (Billboard)	17

=== Year-end charts ===
Chart (2006)	Position
Netherlands (Dutch Top 40)	78
Netherlands (Single Top 100)	81
US Adult R&B Songs (Billboard)	35
Chart (2007)	Position
Netherlands (Single Top 100)	92

== Certifications ==
Region	Certification	Certified units/sales
United States (RIAA)	Gold	500,000^{‡}
^{‡} Sales+streaming figures based on certification alone.
