= George Stanford =

American singer-songwriter

George Simon Stanford is an American singer and songwriter. He was signed to Mercury Records and is best known as the lead vocalist of the band Townhall.

== Education ==
Stanford is a graduate of Harriton High School in Rosemont, Pennsylvania, where he played trombone in his high school jazz band.

== Career ==
Stanford attended the University of the Arts (Philadelphia) to study music but dropped out to play with the Philadelphia rock act Townhall. He played with them for five years, producing one live album and two studio albums (Live at the Point, 2003's New Song, and 2005's American Dreams). In 2006, Stanford moved to Los Angeles and was offered a record deal with Epic Records. He relocated to Smash/Mercury Records the following year, moved back to Philadelphia, and released his debut album, Big Drop, in June 2008. It was preceded by an EP and the lead single "My Own Worst Enemy," which was featured on VH1's "You Oughta Know" program.

After he departed from the label, he formed his own independent label, Gbones Music, and released the EP Roll Away in 2010, which included his single "Meet Me in L.A.". He followed it up with the Las Palmas EP in 2012 and an artist residency at The Piano Bar in Hollywood.

His second studio album, Something Better, was released in 2014 and included the track "Happy As You Are," which was featured on Amazon.com's "Artists on the Rise" series. Later that year, he premiered a holiday track called "It's Christmas Time (Midnight Ridin)".

In 2015, he worked on the soundtrack to the feature film "The Grace of Jake," starring Jordin Sparks and Michael Beck. He released his single "Pressure Makes Diamonds" in October 2015 and premiered it on Pat Monahan's show on SiriusXM's The Pulse. He premiered the song "I Got Famous" on his official social media in May.

In August 2016, Stanford announced he had scored two original songs for the upcoming J.K. Simmons film "The Bachelors," set for release in 2017. The following month, he announced he had signed with Round Hill Music, as a songwriter. He announced a new single release for November titled "Starring You". In 2017, he continued to tour and released three more digital singles, "Better Man", "Future Classic" and "Moving On."

In 2018, his song "Magic Hour" was featured in the television series Kevin (Probably) Saves the World and Chicago P.D. He released a new digital single "Holding On" on May 23, 2018.

Later that year, he announced a new EP recorded in an old Los Angeles church titled Alone at the Pilgrim set for release in November. He also premiered a new digital single titled "Rebellionaire" on October 10.

In November, he began premiering a series of videos from the Alone at the Pilgrim sessions, produced by TAR+FEATHER, leading up to the EP's release on December 7.

== Personal life ==
He is married and has two children.

== Discography ==
=== Solo career ===
Year	Album
2008	Big Drop: 1st studio album; Released: June 3, 2008; Formats: CD, Digital; Label: Mercury Records
2014	Something Better: 2nd studio album; Released: August 29, 2014; Formats: CD, Digital; Label: George Stanford

=== With Townhall ===
Year	Album
2001	Live at the Point: Live album; Released: September 1, 2011; Formats: CD; Label: Home Grown
2003	New Song: 1st studio album; Released: February 25, 2003; Formats: CD, Digital; Label: Townhall
2005	American Dreams: 2nd studio album; Released: June 28, 2005; Formats: CD; Label: 33rd Street

=== EPs ===
Year	Album
2007	The EP: EP; Released: 2007; Formats: CD; Label: Smash Records
2010	Roll Away: EP; Released: March 12, 2010; Formats: CD, Digital; Label: Gbones Music
2012	Las Palmas: EP; Released: July 21, 2012; Formats: CD, Digital; Label: Gbones Music
2018	Alone at the Pilgrim: EP; Released: December 7, 2018; Formats: Digital; Label: George Stanford

=== Singles ===
Year	Single	Chart positions	Album
Year	Single	U.S.	Album
2008	"My Own Worst Enemy"	—	Big Drop
2009	"Meet Me In L.A."	—	Roll Away - EP
2010	"Lemonade"	—	Non-album singles
2012	"Things I Don't Need"	—	Las Palmas - EP
2012	"Christmas For Two"	—	Non-album singles
2013	"It's So Easy"	—	Non-album singles
2013	"You'll Never Know"	—	Non-album singles
2015	"Pressure Makes Diamonds"	—	Non-album singles
2016	"I Got Famous"	—	Non-album singles
2016	"Today For Tomorrow"	—	Non-album singles
2017	"Better Man"	—	Non-album singles
2017	"Starring You"	—	Non-album singles
2017	"Future Classic"	—	Non-album singles
2017	"Movin' On"	—	Non-album singles
2018	"Holding On"	—	Non-album singles
2018	"Rebellionaire"	—	Non-album singles

=== Videos ===
- Alone At The Pilgrim (2018)
- My Own Worst Enemy (2008)
- Meet Me in L.A. (2009)
- Roll Away (2010)
- Lemonade (2011)
- Cardboard Baby (Acoustic) (2012)
- Natural Girls (2011)
- Things I Don't Need (2012)
- Christmas For Two (2012)
- Downriver (2013)
