= Devo Harris =

American record producer and songwriter

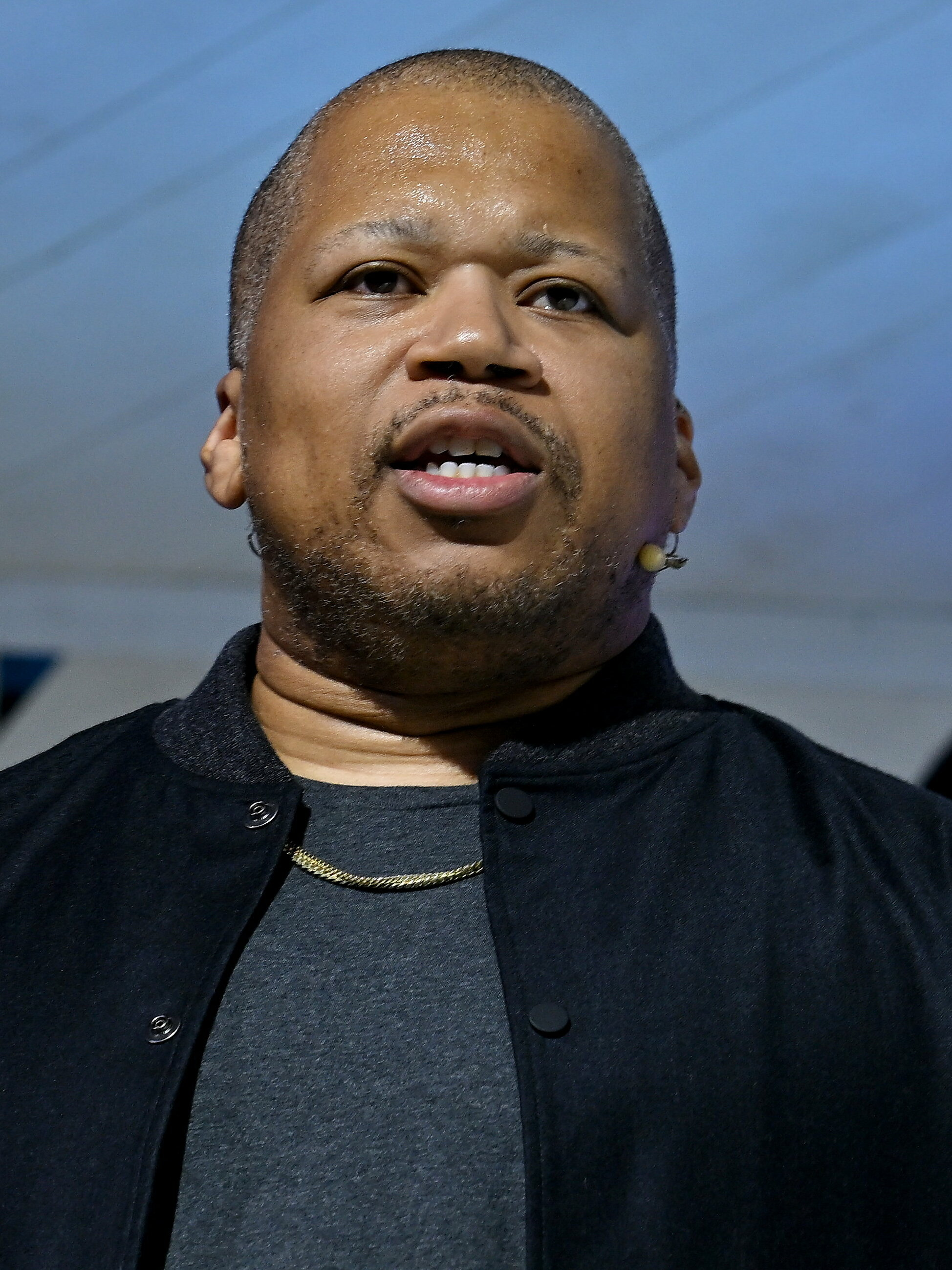
- Harris in 2023
- Born: DeVon Harris; December 9, 1977 (age 48)
- Other name: Devo Springsteen
- Education: University of Pennsylvania (BS); Columbia University (MBA)
- Occupation: Record producer
- Years active: 1994–present
- Relatives: Kanye West (cousin)
- Musical career
- Origin: Columbus, Georgia, U.S.
- Genres: R&B; hip hop; pop
- Labels: Astor Place; GOOD; Geffen

DeVon "Devo" Harris (born December 9, 1977), also known as Devo Springsteen, is an American record producer, songwriter, and DJ. The cousin of American rapper Kanye West, Harris discovered and led American singer John Legend to sign with West's label, GOOD Music, in 2003. Harris extensively contributed to Legend's debut Get Lifted (2004) and subsequent albums, along with releases for other artists including Nas, Britney Spears, Aretha Franklin, Ol' Dirty Bastard, and the Last Poets. For his production on West's 2005 single "Diamonds from Sierra Leone", Harris won the Best Rap Song honor at the 48th Annual Grammy Awards.

Devo earned his BS in Economics from the Wharton School at the University of Pennsylvania. After earning his Master of Business Administration degree from Columbia Business School in 2011, Harris has since shifted focus onto technology and media proprietorship.

== Biography ==
Harris grew up in the U.S. and Germany. Both of his parents were in the U.S. Army. He graduated high school from The Pembroke Hill School in Kansas City, Missouri, and then attended the Wharton School of the University of Pennsylvania. At Penn, he wrestled, played football, and DJed at local radio stations WPPR and WQHS FM. After graduating with degrees in Economics and Strategic Management, he moved to New York City in 2000 with college roommate John Legend. While working in venture capital, he began working part-time assisting and serving as A&R at the production company G.O.O.D. Music. Harris eventually signed Legend to the label in 2003 and managed his project. Harris then earned an MBA degree from Columbia Business School.

== Music ==
Harris's influences include Stevie Wonder, The Doors, Michael Jackson, Rick Rubin, Timbaland, and Dr. Dre. Harris has appeared on MTV Base, BET Style, and VH1 and was a featured guest DJ on BET's Rap City while DJing internationally from Turkey to Japan and Africa.

Harris also co-wrote the tracks "Lullaby" and "Let's Go" with Britney Spears and Tom Craskey. The song appeared on the demo version of Britney's album Blackout.

In 2008, Harris collaborated with John Legend on "If You're Out There" which appears in John Legend's third studio album Evolver. The song was used as Barack Obama's campaign theme song and was performed at the 2008 Democratic National Convention.

== Technology ==
In 2010, Harris created an interactive music video, "Attack of the 5 foot Hipster", by U.S. band Riot In Paris, which debuted on UniverseCity blog and was noted as the first interactive choose-your-own-adventure music video in the U.S. After graduating from Columbia Business School in 2011, Harris started his career in technology by teaching himself to code and launched Red Ochre Inc. in 2014. Soon after, he would become a Senior Product Manager at Vimeo.

In 2020, Harris launched Adventr, an interactive streaming platform. In September 2021, Adventr became a finalist in the 2021 TechCrunch Disrupt Conference and announced its patent on voice-controlled interactive media.

== Discography ==
=== Singles ===
Year	Title (Album)	Artist/Project	Label Released
2009	"Magnificent"	Rick Ross	
2008	"If You're Out There"	John Legend	GOOD/Sony/Columbia
2008	"Association"	Nas	The N Mixtape
2008	"The Promise"	Deborah Cox	Deco Recording Group
2008	"You Know Where My Heart Is"	Deborah Cox	Deco Recording Group
2007	"What Y'all Came To Do"	Aretha Franklin	J Records
2007	"Misunderstood" (Finding Forever)	Common	GOOD/Geffen
2007	"Always Lovin' You"	Kreesha Turner	Virgin
2007	"Celebrate"	Cassidy	J Records
2007	"Let Go"	Britney Spears	Jive Records
2007	"Sweeter"	Estelle	Homeschool/Atlantic
2007	"Come Together"	Estelle	Homeschool/Atlantic
2007	"Blowin' My Phone Up"	Consequence	GOOD/Sony/Columbia
2006	"Let There Be Light" (Hip Hop Is Dead)	Nas	IDJ/Sony/Def Jam
2006	"Stereo" (Once Again)	John Legend	GOOD/Sony/Columbia
2006	"My Love, My Life"	GLC	GOOD Music
2006	"When I Was..."	Rhymefest	J Records
2006	"Back In The Day"	The Last Poets	Jambetta
2005	"Diamonds from Sierra Leone" (Late Registration)	Kanye West	Roc-A-Fella/IDJ
2004	"Refuge (When It's Cold Outside)" (Get Lifted)	John Legend	GOOD/Sony/Columbia
2004	"So High" (Get Lifted)	John Legend	GOOD/Sony/Columbia
2004	"Live It Up" (Get Lifted)	John Legend	GOOD/Sony/Columbia
2004	"Sunkist Sunlab Radio"	Sunkist Soda	
2004	"And You Say"	Consequence	SureShot Records
2003	"Summer Beach House Direct Effect Theme"	MTV	

=== Mixtapes ===
- 2007, "Bacardi Grandmelon And Devo Springsteen Present: The Good The Bad The Ugly"
- 2006, "Bacardi Big Apple & Devo Springsteen Present: The Good Life"

== Awards and nominations ==
Year	Category	Song/Album	Artist	Result
2006	Best Rap Song	"Diamonds from Sierra Leone"	Kanye West	Won
2006	Best Rap Album	Late Registration	Kanye West	Won
2006	Best R&B Album	Get Lifted	John Legend	Won
2006	Best Album	Late Registration	Kanye West	Nominated
