= The Dreamer (Rhett Miller album) =

Studio album by Rhett Miller
- Released: June 5, 2012
- Genre: Country, rock
- Label: Maximum Sunshine Records
- Producer: Rhett Miller

Rhett Miller chronology
The Interpreter: Live at Largo (2011)	The Dreamer (2012)	The Traveler (2015)

The Dreamer is the sixth album and fifth studio album of Old 97's front man Rhett Miller. It was released in June 2012, and is his first self-produced album. One song is a duet with Rosanne Cash. Reviewers note that it is more country-oriented than his previous solo releases.

At a show at the Swedish American Hall on November 30, 2011 Miller said that he had written the song "Marina" on the journey over the Bay Bridge on the way to the show. He claimed that friends constantly ask him to write songs about a friend or child but that he felt that he had written plenty of name-oriented songs (Wreck Your Life's Victoria, Drag It Up's Adelaide). However, he thought his friend's daughter had a great name (Marina) and wrote a song about her. Once he arrived in San Francisco, as he told it, he found out that the Marina was "the part of San Francisco where the douchebag frat-boys live."

Album closer "Sweet Dreams" shares "the chord structure of 'Blue Moon' or the myriad early rock songs with which it shares the pattern". Miller came up with the verse first, then built the rest on his father-in-law's request for more of a story (who specifically inspired "we met on a friday night I'll never forget"). Miller agonized over a lyric that originally went: "Oh in the future please include me in your schemes/until then all I can say is sweet dreams". His desire for a "twist" eventually led to the 11th-hour replacement of the lyric while in the studio with the final lyric "Although it's nothing/nothing's what it seems/but for now all I can say is sweet dreams", which he felt was "obtuse but evocative, and filled with that magical hopelessness that has informed and inspired almost all of the love songs I've written over the last quarter century."

== Track listing ==
All songs by Rhett Miller except where noted.

1. "Lost Without You" - 4:54 (Rhett Miller, Ben Kweller)
2. "Long Long Long" - 3:03
3. "Out of Love" - 3:26
4. "Sleepwalkin'" - 3:41
5. "This Summer Lie" - 2:36
6. "I'll Try To" - 3:06 (Rhett Miller, Jude Cole)
7. "Marina" - 3:01
8. "Swimmin' in Sunshine" - 3:12
9. "As Close as I Came to Being Right" (featuring Rosanne Cash) - 3:51 (Rhett Miller, Rosanne Cash)
10. "Love Grows" - 1:49
11. "Picture This" - 2:57 (Rhett Miller, James Cleare)
12. "Complicated Man" - 3:36
13. "Sweet Dreams" - 2:44
