= Old 97's & Waylon Jennings =

EP by Old 97's with Waylon Jennings
- Released: October 1, 2013
- Recorded: 1996
- Genre: Alternative country
- Label: Omnivore Recordings
- Producers: John Croslin (tracks 1–2); Old 97's (tracks 3–6)

Old 97's chronology
Too Far to Care: Expanded Edition (2012)	Old 97's & Waylon Jennings (2013)	Most Messed Up (2014)

Waylon Jennings chronology
Goin' Down Rockin': The Last Recordings (2012)	Old 97's & Waylon Jennings (2013)	Songbird (2025)

Old 97's & Waylon Jennings is an EP consisting of 1996 demo recordings by American country/rock band Old 97's and two unreleased duets with country music legend Waylon Jennings. It was released on October 1, 2013, by Omnivore Recordings.

== Recording and release ==
In 1996 Waylon Jennings caught an Old 97's concert in Atlanta and was impressed with their sound and raved about them in The Austin Chronicle. After prompting by the band's representative at Elektra Records, lead singer Rhett Miller wrote Jennings and recommended a collaboration. Jennings accepted and cut two Old 97's originals in Nashville, "Iron Road" and "The Other Shoe." Jennings had trouble with the latter song's second verse lyric, "You'll try to find a doctor that will prescribe an elixir that'll make everything better..." as he kept mispronouncing "elixir" as "excelsior." Miller recalls: "Eventually, I had an idea. I told him to just use the phrase 'Annie licks her.' He started laughing. 'I like you, you're sick,' he told me. And he nailed it on the next take." Jennings, in poor health after the recordings, apparently objected to the proposed cover art for the release, a painting by Jon Langford showing Jennings surrounded by the angel-winged heads of the Old 97's. Waylon's son Shooter Jennings approved the 2013 release of the recordings.

The remaining four songs are Old 97's demo recordings from the same time period. A studio version of "Visiting Hours" found its way onto the 2011 release The Grand Theatre, Volume Two. A new version of "Fireflies" was recorded for Rhett Miller's 2006 solo album The Believer. "Born on a Train" is a cover of the Stephin Merritt-penned tune for The Magnetic Fields.

== Track listing ==
All songs written by the Old 97's except as shown.

1. "Iron Road" (vocals by Waylon Jennings)
2. "The Other Shoe" (vocals by Waylon Jennings)
3. "Visiting Hours"
4. "Fireflies"
5. "London I Know"
6. "Born on a Train" (Stephin Merritt)

== Personnel ==
- Waylon Jennings – vocals
- Ken Bethea – guitar
- Murry Hammond – bass, vocals
- Rhett Miller – guitar, vocals
- Philip Peeples – drums

== Chart performance ==
Chart (2013)	Peak position
US Top Country Albums (Billboard)	65
