= The Traveler (Rhett Miller album) =

Studio album by Rhett Miller
- Released: May 12, 2015
- Studio: Jackpot! (Portland); Walker (Portland)
- Genre: Country rock; alternative country
- Length: 46:29
- Label: ATO
- Producer: Chris Funk

Rhett Miller chronology
The Dreamer (2012)	The Traveler (2015)

The Traveler is the seventh album, and sixth studio album, by Old 97's front man Rhett Miller. It was released in 2015, and was recorded with the band Black Prairie.

Professional ratings
Aggregate scores
Source	Rating
Metacritic	77%
Review scores
Source	Rating
AllMusic	3.5/5 stars
The A.V. Club	B+
Robert Christgau	(3-star Honorable Mention)
PopMatters	7/10 stars

== Track listing ==
All songs written by Rhett Miller, except where noted.

1. Wanderlust - 3:6
2. Jules (Miller, Murry Hammond) - 4:06
3. Most in the Summertime - 4:47
4. My Little Disaster - 4:29
5. Fair Enough - 3:42
6. Kiss Me on the Fire Escape - 2:58
7. Lucky Star - 3:26
8. Escape Velocity - 3:14
9. Dreams vs. Waking Life - 5:44
10. Wicked Things (Miller, Richard Edwards) - 3:12
11. Good Night - 4:13
12. Reasons to Live - 3:22

== Personnel ==
Credits adapted from the album's liner notes.

=== Rhett Miller and Black Prairie ===
- Rhett Miller – acoustic guitar, vocals
- Jenny Conlee-Drizos – accordion, piano, Chamberlin, Hammond B3 organ
- Chris Funk – Dobro, Weissenborn guitar, bouzouki, Marxophone, electric guitar, bells, samples, production, additional engineering
- John Moen – drums, percussion, vocals
- Jon Neufeld – acoustic guitars, electric guitars
- Nate Query – upright bass, electric bass
- Annalisa Tornfelt – fiddle, all strings, nyckelharpa, vocals

=== Additional contributors ===
- Adam Selzer – engineering
- Vance Powell – mixing
- Roger Seibel – mastering
- Draplin Design Company – graphic design
- Salim Nourallah – cover and back photos
- Jason Quigley – inner sleeve photos
- Peter Buck – 12-string electric guitar, mandolin, Bass 6
- Scott McCaughey – Bass 6 solo arrangements
- Ryan Miller – background vocals on "Escape Velocity"
