= The Grand Theatre, Volume One =

Studio album by Old 97's
- Released: October 12, 2010
- Genre: Alternative country, Southern rock
- Length: 44:35
- Label: New West
- Producer: Salim Nourallah

Old 97's chronology
Mimeograph EP (2010)	The Grand Theatre, Volume One (2010)	The Grand Theatre, Volume Two (2011)

Professional ratings
Review scores
Source	Rating
AllMusic	4/5 stars
Spin	7/10 stars
Classic Rock	7/10 stars
Robert Christgau	A−
Uncut	3/5 stars

The Grand Theatre, Volume One is the title of the eighth studio album from alternative country/rock band the Old 97's, released on October 12, 2010. The band took up a week-long residency at Sons of Hermann Hall in Dallas, Texas, simulating the concert experience to test out new material. The songs which the band felt worked were then taken to Treefort Studios in Austin, Texas, for proper recording. Over two dozen songs were recorded during these sessions. The remaining material was released as The Grand Theatre, Volume Two in 2011.

== Track list ==
All songs written by Rhett Miller, Ken Bethea, Murry Hammond and Philip Peeples, except where noted.

1. "The Grand Theatre" - 3:15
2. "Every Night Is Friday Night (Without You)" - 2:45
3. "The Magician" - 3:54
4. "You Were Born to Be in Battle" - 3:50
5. "The Dance Class" - 3:22
6. "Let the Whiskey Take the Reins" - 4:10
7. "Champaign, Illinois" - 3:25 (Bob Dylan/Rhett Miller)
8. "A State of Texas" - 2:54
9. "You Smoke Too Much" - 3:44
10. "Love Is What You Are" - 4:04
11. "Please Hold on While the Train is Moving" - 5:26
12. "The Beauty Marks" - 3:34

=== Bonus tracks ===
- "Marcy Anne" (iTunes bonus track)
- "Two Family Trees" (Amazon bonus track)

== Personnel ==
- Rhett Miller: vocals, guitars
- Murry Hammond: bass guitar, guitars, vocals
- Ken Bethea: guitars
- Philip Peeples: drums, percussion
- Rip Rowan: bridge piano on Please Hold On While The Train Is Moving
