= Mark Rubin =

Mark Rubin may refer to:

- Mark Rubin (American football)
- Mark Rubin (musician)
