= Too Far to Care =

Country rock album by Old 97's

Studio album by Old 97's
- Released: June 17, 1997
- Recorded: Village Productions in Tornillo, TX
- Genre: Alternative country, country rock
- Length: 42:20
- Label: Elektra
- Producer: Wally Gagel

Old 97's chronology
Wreck Your Life (1996)	Too Far to Care (1997)	Fight Songs (1999)

Professional ratings
Review scores
Source	Rating
AllMusic	4.5/5 stars
The Austin Chronicle	4/5 stars
The Boston Phoenix	4/4 stars
Chicago Tribune	3/4 stars
Christgau's Consumer Guide	B+
PopMatters	9/10
Rolling Stone	3.5/5 stars
The Rolling Stone Album Guide	4/5 stars
USA Today	3.5/4 stars
Country Standard Time	(favorable)

Too Far to Care is the third studio album by American country/rock band Old 97's, first released on June 17, 1997 (see 1997 in music). The album's title comes from the song "Streets of Where I'm From."

== History ==
The album was the band's first on Elektra Records. Unlike the later two Elektra recordings, the band retained some of their country twang, making this another fan favorite. Lyrically, the band's constant touring is evident in songs like "Barrier Reef" (with references to Chicago), "Broadway" (in New York City), and "Niteclub" (inspired, according to the band, by clubs in Cleveland, Ohio and Ann Arbor, Michigan). "Four Leaf Clover", re-recorded from the band's first album, Hitchhike To Rhome, is performed here as a duet with Exene Cervenka of the band X. "Big Brown Eyes" is also re-recorded, this time from the second album, Wreck Your Life.

Rhett has clarified that, although his name is Stewart Ransom Miller (The Second), the song "Barrier Reef" is not really autobiographical. Stewart Ransom Miller is technically Rhett's father, who apparently is sometimes asked "are you the Stewart Ransom Miller?" and answers "yes, but I think you may have me confused with my son." Instead, it's "the guy in that song, the guy who gets laid and finds himself unsurprised at how little solace there is in the coupling."

"Broadway" was written while Miller was in a hotel room in New York City during their courtship with Elektra Records Miller felt very out of place, saying "As I stood in that tiny room, I did the math. I could live for a month in my East Dallas garage apartment for the amount of money Elektra was paying per night at the Paramount Hotel. Granted, my accommodations in Dallas were humble to say the least, but this was some serious opulence. If you ever wonder why the old "major label" business model failed, look no further than the money lavished on our little Texas rock band by the dozen or so labels that wooed us that summer. Ridiculous."

Miller used the biblical name "Salome" to "protect the, well, not-so-innocent ... castigating female." Miller came to visit his female acquaintance and found no answer at her door. He "retrieved an inflatable pool float", then fell asleep at her doorstep. He awoke to male and female laughter, kicked in her door, put his hand around the man's throat, and then decided to leave.

The title of "Melt Show" comes from the band Melt which had one of Miller's best friends, Clark Vogeler as a member (now part of the Toadies). Miller says "I spent many a night in the front row at the Melt show." The song is specifically about a Cuban girl from Miami that Miller fell in love with, proposed to, realized his mistake, and eventually parted ways with.

The line, "I'm calling Time And Temperature just for some company" in the song "Big Brown Eyes" refers to calling the time and temperature line. Rhett says: "the phone in our kitchen had a twenty-five foot cord that stretched throughout the upstairs of the garage. Not only was this before cell phones, it was before the ubiquity of the cordless land line. That phone, with its unending silence, mocked me. I still remember dialing 844 and then any four numbers in order to discover the time and temperature. The internet has since rendered such a service laughably archaic. At the time, though, the voice at the other end of that number soothed me in a way I can't quite explain. She was a constant in a mad, quickly changing world. And when I called, she would always answer."

"Just Like California" is, according to Miller, "a simple fantasy about being in love with a girl named Clementine who lived in California until the San Andreas Fault gave way, dropping the whole state into the Pacific Ocean."

"Curtain Calls" was written while Miller was visiting his brother in Breckenridge, Colorado in 1996 with his sister. Miller went out to a local nightclub and came home "feeling lonely." He felt: "so many people, so much mirth, and yet, in the end, we are all alone." He said that "like many songs I was writing at the time, it dealt with the allure of the itinerant life of a musician, the life onto which I was embarking, and the strong ambivalence I felt about it."

When writing "Niteclub", Miller "was living with a young woman who was poised and destined to move to New York City to pursue her dream. And then she did move. And the fuel that her departure provided my young songwriting machine burned hot indeed. I remember writing this song, or its lyrics anyway, in a phone booth in a nightclub in Cleveland. It was her 22nd birthday, and I was not with her. But I was where I was meant to be." Miller has observed the irony of the lyrics: "the nightclub did steal my youth. And the nightclub does follow me around, unchanging and eternal. And while I'm busy loving my job, I'm also lamenting the life it precludes. You know, the normal life? The 9 to 5?"

Miller wrote "House That Used to Be" around 3am while feeling lonely in his "two bedroom house a block off of White Rock Lake." He wrote it with the assistance of a Rhyming Dictionary. "I gave myself a challenge: make a list of rhyming, two-syallable words, compound words or phrases that sounded juicy and turn that list into a song. 'Graveyard/Co-starred,' 'Corn silk/Spilt milk,' 'Quaaludes/Corkscrewed' etc ..."

"Four Leaf Clover" was originally recorded on Hitchhike To Rhome, the first Old 97's album. Rhett was searching for a duet to record with friend Exene Cervenka and "had started work on an old-fashioned duet that I thought we might sing, but Exene proclaimed it 'too pretty'." That song later became "Fireflies." Instead, Exene sang on "Four Leaf Clover", replacing the lyric "nothing to impress you" with "nothing to attract you" which Rhett found "much sexier."

== Track listing ==
All songs written by Rhett Miller, Ken Bethea, Murry Hammond and Philip Peeples.

1. "Timebomb" – 3:08
2. "Barrier Reef" – 3:49
3. "Broadway" – 3:22
4. "Salome" – 4:07
5. "W. TX Teardrops" (vocals by Murry Hammond) – 3:05
6. "Melt Show" – 3:07
7. "Streets of Where I'm From" – 3:15
8. "Big Brown Eyes" – 4:23
9. "Just Like California" – 2:33
10. "Curtain Calls" – 4:18
11. "Niteclub" – 3:49
12. "House That Used to Be" – 4:08
13. "Four Leaf Clover" (with Exene Cervenka) – 3:20

== Too Far to Care: Expanded Edition ==
Too Far to Care: Expanded Edition / They Made a Monster: The Too Far to Care Demos

Studio album by Old 97's
- Released: 2012
- Genre: Alternative country, country rock
- Label: Omnivore Recordings / Elektra
- Producer: Wally Gagel

Old 97's chronology
The Grand Theatre, Volume Two (2011)	Too Far to Care: Expanded Edition / They Made a Monster: The Too Far to Care Demos (2012)	Old 97's & Waylon Jennings EP (2013)

For the album's fifteenth anniversary in 2012, Omnivore Recordings released an expanded two-disc version of Too Far to Care. The first disc is a re-issue of the original recording with four bonus tracks entitled Too Far to Care: Expanded Edition:

- "Northern Line" (David Roback, Kendra Smith) – 4:27
- "Beer Cans" – 4:28
- "No Doubt About It" – 2:40
- "Holy Cross" – 4:24

The second disc is a collection of demos titled They Made a Monster: The Too Far to Care Demos:

1. "Broadway" – 3:40
2. "Daybed" – 4:55
3. "Barrier Reef" – 3:45
4. "W. TX Teardrops" – 3:19
5. "Niteclub" – 3:46
6. "When I Crash" – 3:26
7. "You Were Right" – 3:30
8. "Sound of Running" – 3:04
9. "Everybody But Me" – 3:06
10. "Holy Cross" – 4:24
11. "The 1" – 3:09

== Personnel ==
Old 97's

- Rhett Miller – vocals, guitar
- Murry Hammond – bass guitar, vocals
- Ken Bethea – guitars
- Philip Peeples – drums, percussion

Additional personnel

- Jon Rauhouse – pedal steel, banjo
- Wally Gagel – piano, Mellotron, percussion
- Exene Cervenka – vocals on "Four Leaf Clover"
