= Searching Through That Minor Key =

Studio album by Nicholas Altobelli
- Released: July 7, 2015
- Recorded: Pleasantry Lane Studios, Dallas, Texas
- Genre: Folk, folk pop
- Length: 28:21
- Label: Dalton Records
- Producer: Salim Nourallah

Professional ratings
Review scores
Source	Rating
Blurt Magazine	3/5 stars
Elmore Magazine	(91/100)
PopMatters	6/10 stars

Searching Through That Minor Key is a 2015 album by Nicholas Altobelli.

== Track listing ==
All tracks are written by Nicholas Altobelli

No.	Title	Writer(s)	Length
1.	"Searching Through That Minor Key"		2:07
2.	"Dogwood"		3:21
3.	"In The Morning"		2:42
4.	"Sarah"		2:31
5.	"Painted Aeroplanes"		2:12
6.	"In Your Arms"		3:38
7.	"Lonely Heart"		2:55
8.	"Metal Tree"	Nicholas Altobelli/Johnny Beauford	3:18
9.	"Alabaster"		2:47
10.	"Pile of Leaves"		2:50

== Personnel ==
=== Musicians ===
- Nicholas Altobelli - vocals, acoustic guitars
- Salim Nourallah - bass, keyboards, backing vocals
- John Dufilho - drums, percussion
- Rahim Quazi - keyboards, piano
- Joe Reyes - electric guitars
- Paul Slavens - accordion, piano, bells, keyboards
- Laura Scarborough - bells, vibraphone
- Chris Holt - acoustic guitar
- Trey Carmichael - drums
- Jonathan Eisenzoph - cello
- Kim Nall - backing vocals

=== Production ===
- Salim Nourallah – producer, engineer, mixer
- Dave Willingham – mastering
- Nicholas Altobelli & Marianne Reed – photography
- Trey Carmichael – design
- Miranda Vinning - artwork
