= Mythologies (Rhett Miller album) =

Studio album by Rhett Miller
- Released: 1989
- Genre: Folk
- Label: Carpe Diem
- Producer: Murry Hammond

Rhett Miller chronology
Mythologies (1989)	The Instigator (2002)

Professional ratings
Review scores
Source	Rating
Allmusic	3/5 stars

Mythologies is the first studio album by American country/rock band performer, Rhett Miller, who later became the lead singer and songwriter of the Old 97's. Miller recorded the album with friend, and future Old 97's bassist, Murry Hammond. His next solo effort would wait more than a decade.

== Track listing ==
1. "Iron Child" – 2:40
2. "Days Between Stations" – 2:44
3. "Song for Truman Capote" – 3:32
4. "Fishbowl" – 2:26
5. "Still They Sing" – 4:28
6. "Redbird Song" – 4:12
7. "Cicada Song" – 4:07
8. "Honey in My Tea" – 3:45
9. "I'm Coming Home" – 3:19
10. "Sea Shell Girl" – 4:07
11. "Candy Apple Corkscrew Hair" – 1:57
12. "Staten Island Ferry Boat" – 2:32
13. "Between Timid and Timbuktu" – 2:09
