= Blame It on Gravity =

Studio album by Old 97's
- Released: May 13, 2008
- Genre: Alternative country
- Label: New West
- Producer: Ross Miller

Old 97's chronology
Hit by a Train: The Best of the Old 97's (2006)	Blame It on Gravity (2008)	Mimeograph EP (2010)

Blame It on Gravity is the seventh studio album by American country/rock band Old 97's, released on May 13, 2008. It entered the Billboard 200 album charts at No. 85. The album was produced by Salim Nourallah.

== Reception ==
Professional ratings
Review scores
Source	Rating
AllMusic	4.5/5 stars
Robert Christgau	A–
Rolling Stone	3.5/5 stars

The album was met with critical acclaim. Robert Christgau gave the album an A−, and on the NPR radio show All Things Considered said, "[Old 97's] just put out their best album in seven years. Blame It On Gravity is noticeably more taut and focused than their earlier albums--more delicate, too."

== Track listing ==
All tracks are written by Rhett Miller except where noted.

No.	Title	Writer(s)	Length
1.	"The Fool"		4:16
2.	"Dance with Me"		2:39
3.	"No Baby I"		3:32
4.	"My Two Feet"		3:27
5.	"Ride"		3:30
6.	"She Loves the Sunset"		2:37
7.	"This Beautiful Thing"	Murry Hammond	3:06
8.	"I Will Remain"		3:11
9.	"Early Morning"		2:50
10.	"The Easy Way"		4:26
11.	"Here's to the Halcyon"		2:46
12.	"Color of a Lonely Heart Is Blue"	Hammond	5:51
13.	"The One"		4:06

Bonus tracks on iTunes Bonus Video version
No.	Title	Length
14.	"Motorcycle Club (Demo)"
15.	"Damn Your Misery (Demo)"

== Personnel ==
Old 97's

- Rhett Miller - vocals, guitars
- Murry Hammond - bass, guitars, vocals, keyboards
- Ken Bethea - guitars, vocals
- Philip Peeples - drums

Additional musicians

- Rip Rowan - keyboards
- Salim Nourallah - keyboards, guitars
- Ward Williams - pedal steel
