= The Interpreter (album) =

The Interpreter: Live at Largo

Live album by Rhett Miller
- Released: November 22, 2011
- Genre: Pop rock
- Label: Maximum Sunshine Records

Rhett Miller chronology
Rhett Miller (2009)	The Interpreter: Live at Largo (2011)	The Dreamer (2012)

Professional ratings
Review scores
Source	Rating
AllMusic	3.5/5 stars

The Interpreter: Live at Largo is a live album and a collection of cover songs, performed by Old 97's front man Rhett Miller at the Largo nightclub in Los Angeles, California. It was released in 2011, the recordings being from something of a farewell performance for the Largo before it closed its doors. In it, Miller covers some of his favorite songs for a venue that was special to him.

Miller performs solo on most of the tracks, but is joined by Largo regular Jon Brion on several of them and Joey Santiago of The Pixies on another.

== Track listing ==
1. "Homeward Bound" – 2:42 (Paul Simon)
2. "American Girl" – 2:09 (Tom Petty)
3. "California Stars"† – 4:06 (Woody Guthrie, Jay Bennett, Jeff Tweedy)
4. "Happiness" – 4:11 (Elliott Smith)
5. "Brilliant Mistake" – 2:36 (Declan Patrick Aloys MacManus)
6. "Queen Bitch"† – 2:47 (David Bowie)
7. "Waterloo Sunset" – 3:00 (Raymond Douglas Davies)
8. "Wave of Mutilation / I Wanna Be Sedated" – 3:33 (Francis Black / Dee Dee Ramone, Johnny Ramone, Joey Ramone)
9. "The Bewlay Brothers"† – 4:51 (David Bowie)
10. "The Birth of the True" – 2:07 (Roddy Frame)
11. "I'll Cry Instead"† – 2:47 (John Lennon, Paul McCartney)
12. "You're Gonna Make Me Lonesome When You Go"* – 4:17 (Bob Dylan)
13. "Cynthia Mask"† – 3:43 (Robyn Hitchcock)
14. "Wave of Mutilation"‡ – 2:19 (Francis Black)
15. Farewell Banter – 0:19

† Featuring Jon Brion
‡ Featuring Joey Santiago

== Personnel ==
- Rhett Miller – Acoustic guitar and vocals
- Jon Brion – Piano, backing vocals, drums, electric guitar
- Joey Santiago – Acoustic guitar
- Tom Biller – Bass
