= Without a Home =

Studio album by Nicholas Altobelli
- Released: February 26, 2013
- Recorded: Pleasantry Lane Studios, Dallas, Texas
- Genre: Folk
- Length: 38:41
- Label: Dalton Records
- Producer: Salim Nourallah

Professional ratings
Review scores
Source	Rating
Allmusic	link
Dallas Morning News	favorable
The Aquarian	favorable
M Music & Musicians	favorable
No Depression	favorable

Without a Home is a 2013 album by Nicholas Altobelli.

== Track listing ==
All tracks are written by Nicholas Altobelli

No.	Title	Length
1.	"The Lucky Ones"	4:09
2.	"Glitter"	3:43
3.	"I Don't Think Tonight is Going to Be a Good Night"	3:07
4.	"Over My Head"	4:01
5.	"Blackout"	4:18
6.	"L.A. Rain"	5:04
7.	"Never Enough"	3:10
8.	"This City"	3:01
9.	"27 Stories"	3:41
10.	"I Just Want to Feel Real"	4:27

== Personnel ==
=== Musicians ===
- Nicholas Altobelli - vocals, acoustic guitars
- Salim Nourallah - bass, backing vocals
- John Dufilho - drums, percussion
- Becky Middleton - keys, piano, backing vocals
- Joe Reyes - electric guitars
- Paul Slavens - accordion

=== Production ===
- Salim Nourallah – producer, engineer, mixer
- Carl Saff – mastering
- Nicholas Altobelli & Marianne Reed – photography
- Trey Carmichael – design
