= Rhett Miller (album) =

Studio album by Rhett Miller
- Released: June 9, 2009
- Genres: Pop rock, adult alternative
- Length: 42:05
- Label: Shout! Factory
- Producer: Salim Nourallah

Rhett Miller chronology
The Believer (2006)	Rhett Miller (2009)	The Interpreter: Live at Largo (2011)

Professional ratings
Review scores
Source	Rating
Absolute Punk	73% link
Allmusic	link
The A.V. Club	B link
BBC	Positive link
Billboard	Positive link
Pitchfork Media	5.9/10 link
PopMatters	link
Rolling Stone	link
Slant Magazine	link
Spin Magazine	link

Rhett Miller is the album from Old 97's lead singer Rhett Miller. This is his fourth solo album, and first since his 2006 album The Believer. In a four-star review, Rolling Stone called the album Miller's "strongest set yet."

== Track listing ==
(All songs written by Rhett Miller, except where noted)

1. "Nobody Says I Love You Anymore"
2. "Like Love"
3. "Caroline"
4. "I Need to Know Where I Stand"
5. "Happy Birthday Don't Die"
6. "Bonfire"
7. "Haphazardly"
8. "If It's Not Love" (Miller, Matt Scannell)
9. "Another Girlfriend"
10. "Refusing Temptation"
11. "Lashes"
12. "Sometimes"

== Dedication ==
The album is dedicated to Miller's grandmother, Narene Miller, who died shortly before the album's release. The album notes also contain reference to Miller's friend and writer, David Foster Wallace, who died several months before the release of the album.

== Personnel ==
- Rhett Miller – vocals, acoustic guitar, handclaps (4), electric guitar (5), group vocal (9)
- John Dufilho – drums (1, 2, 3, 4, 5, 7, 8, 9, 10, 11), tambourine (3, 5, 11), shaker (3, 5), kick drum (6), group vocal (9), mouth percussion (11)
- Jon Brion – bass (1), electric guitar (3, 9)
- Billy Harvey – electric guitar, piano (2), twelve-string acoustic (4), acoustic guitar (10, 11), bass (11)
- Rip Rowan – piano (1), tambourine (2, 3, 4, 7, 8, 11), wurlitzer (3), shaker (4), handclaps (4), organ (7), lap percussion (8), mellotron (9), group vocal (9), mouth percussion (11)
- Salim Nourallah – background vocals (1, 4, 11), bass (2, 4, 5, 7, 8, 9, 10), electric guitar (2, 5), piano (2), twelve-string acoustic (3), organ (6, 8), acoustic guitar (6, 11), finger tap (12), tambourine (12)
- Paul Averitt – background vocals (1–5, 7–12), twelve-string electric (8, 11), tambourine (10)
- Jason Garner – bass (3)
- Gavin Nourallah – raygun (5)
- Kristy Kruger – background vocals (10)
- John Lefler – B4 organ (10), sampletron (12)
- Jason Janik – Photography
- Aimee Macauley – Package Design
