= The Grand Theatre, Volume Two =

2011 album by Old 97's

Studio album by Old 97's
- Released: July 5, 2011
- Genre: Alternative country
- Label: New West Records
- Producer: Salim Nourallah

Old 97's chronology
The Grand Theatre, Volume One (2010)	The Grand Theatre, Volume Two (2011)	Most Messed Up (2014)

Professional ratings
Review scores
Source	Rating
Allmusic	4/5 stars
Rolling Stone	3.5/5 stars

The Grand Theatre, Volume Two is the title of the ninth studio album from alternative country/rock band the Old 97's, released on July 5, 2011.

== Track list ==
1. "Brown Haired Daughter" - 3:31
2. "I'm a Trainwreck" - 3:14
3. "Perfume" - 3:04
4. "The Actor" - 3:29
5. "No Simple Machine" - 3:13
6. "White Port" - 3:42
7. "Ivy" - 4:01
8. "Manhattan (I'm Done)" - 3:10
9. "Marquita" - 1:26
10. "Bright Spark (See What I Mean)" - 2:41
11. "Visiting Hours" - 3:36
12. "How Lovely All It Was" - 4:09
13. "You Call It Rain" - 2:39

== Personnel ==
Old 97's

- Rhett Miller: vocals, guitars
- Murry Hammond: bass, guitars, vocals, piano, harmonium
- Ken Bethea: guitars
- Philip Peeples: drums, percussion, guitar on "Brown Haired Daughter"

Additional Cameos

- Richard Martin: piano on "Perfume"
- Audie Bethea: guitar on "White Port"
