= Graveyard Whistling =

Studio album by Old 97's
- Released: February 24, 2017
- Recorded: April 2016
- Studio: Sonic Ranch
- Genre: Alt-country
- Label: ATO
- Producer: Vance Powell

Old 97's chronology
Most Messed Up (2014)	Graveyard Whistling (2017)	Love the Holidays (2018)

Graveyard Whistling is the eleventh studio album by American alt-country band Old 97's, released on February 24, 2017. The album's title comes from the song "Irish Whiskey Pretty Girls." The album was recorded at Sonic Ranch in April 2016. Brandi Carlile joins in on the vocals of "Good with God".

A review in Mother Jones Magazine ends with this summation of the album: "Graveyard Whistling will make you feel more alive and more aware of your inexorable mortality at once."

== Track listing ==
All tracks by Rhett Miller, Ken Bethea, Murry Hammond and Philip Peeples except where noted.

1. "I Don't Wanna Die In This Town" (Miller, Bethea, Hammond, Peeples, Salim Nourallah) - 3:58
2. "Bad Luck Charm" (Miller, Bethea, Hammond, Peeples, Caitlin Rose) - 3:33
3. "All Who Wander" - 4:13
4. "Jesus Loves You" (Miller, Bethea, Hammond, Peeples, Salim Nourallah, Gaines Greer) - 3:20
5. "Good With God" (featuring Brandi Carlile) (Miller, Bethea, Hammond, Peeples, Brandi Carlile) - 3:55
6. "She Hates Everybody" (Miller, Bethea, Hammond, Peeples, Salim Nourallah) - 3:41
7. "Irish Whiskey Pretty Girls" - 4:19
8. "Nobody" - 3:17
9. "Drinkin' Song" - 2:55
10. "Turns Out I'm Trouble" - 4:36
11. "Those Were the Days" (Miller, Bethea, Hammond, Peeples, Nicole Atkins) - 3:56

== Personnel ==
Old 97's

- Rhett Miller - lead vocals, acoustic guitar
- Murry Hammond - bass, backing vocals
- Ken Bethea - lead guitar
- Philip Peeples - drums, percussion

Additional Musicians

- Fats Kaplin - pedal steel guitar, fiddle, theremin
- Daniel Ellsworth - piano
- Nicole Atkins, Caitlin Rose - backing vocals
- Mike Fahey, Jason Garner, Robert Jenkins, Vance Powell, Mario Ramirez - "Gang vocals"
