= Old 97's Live =

Video by Old 97's
- Released: January 25, 2005
- Recorded: March 2004, Santa Monica, California
- Genre: Alt.country; Country rock
- Label: New West Records

Old 97's Live is a live DVD released by country/rock band Old 97's on January 25, 2005. It was recorded March 2004 at the Troubadour on Santa Monica Blvd. in Los Angeles, California. It contains songs from their entire discography, including the then-unreleased Drag It Up.

It was given a rating of eight by PopMatters.

== Track list ==
1. Just Like California
2. King of All the World
3. Weightless
4. Rollerskate Skinny
5. Won't Be Home
6. Smokers
7. Melt Show
8. Wish the Worst
9. Lonely Holiday
10. Up the Devil's Pay
11. Friends Forever
12. New Kid
13. Jagged
14. Four Leaf Clover
15. Question
16. Valentine
17. Murder (Or a Heart Attack)
18. Doreen
19. Big Brown Eyes
20. Time Bomb
