= Fight Songs (Old 97's album) =

Studio album by Old 97's
- Released: April 27, 1999
- Recorded: Kingsway in New Orleans, Louisiana, United States
- Genre: Country rock, alternative country, alternative rock, power pop
- Length: 46:45
- Label: Elektra
- Producer: Andrew Williams

Old 97's chronology
Too Far to Care (1997)	Fight Songs (1999)	Early Tracks EP (2000)

Singles from Fight Songs
- 1. "Murder (Or a Heart Attack)" Released: 1999; 2. "Nineteen" Released: 1999

Professional ratings
Review scores
Source	Rating
AllMusic	3.5/5 stars
The Austin Chronicle	4/5 stars
The Boston Phoenix	3/4 stars
Entertainment Weekly	A−
Los Angeles Times	3/4 stars
Pitchfork	4.0/10
Rolling Stone	3/5 stars
The Rolling Stone Album Guide	4/5 stars
Spin	7/10
The Village Voice	A

Fight Songs is the fourth studio album by American alternative country band Old 97's, first released on April 27, 1999. It features the song "Murder (Or a Heart Attack)", which was ranked #176 on Blender magazine's list of "500 Greatest Songs From 1980-2005."

The group's second record on Elektra Records, Fight Songs is more slick and pop-oriented than the group's previous efforts, a trend continued on 2001's Satellite Rides. The song "Crash on the Barrelhead" is rumored to be targeted at alt-country rival, Ryan Adams, while "Murder ..." was inspired by a cat owned by singer Miller's roommate in Los Angeles.

== Track listing ==
All songs written by Rhett Miller, Ken Bethea, Murry Hammond and Philip Peeples.

1. "Jagged" – 3:27
2. "Lonely Holiday" – 4:08
3. "Oppenheimer" – 3:28
4. "Indefinitely" – 3:41
5. "What We Talk About" – 4:10
6. "Crash on the Barrelhead" (vocals by Murry Hammond) – 2:39
7. "Murder (Or a Heart Attack)" – 3:41
8. "Alone So Far" – 4:17
9. "Busted Afternoon" – 3:11
10. "19" – 3:41
11. "Let the Idiot Speak" – 3:43
12. "Valentine" (vocals by Murry Hammond) – 3:08

== Personnel ==
Old 97's

- Ken Bethea – guitar
- Murry Hammond – bass, vocals
- Rhett Miller – vocals, guitar
- Philip Peeples – drums, percussion

Additional personnel

- Jon Rauhouse – steel on "Jagged", "Lonely Holiday" and "Alone So Far"
- Jon Brion – Vox organ on "Murder (Or a Heart Attack)"
- Andrew Williams – odds and ends
