= Most Messed Up =

Studio album by Old 97's
- Released: April 29, 2014
- Recorded: January 2014, Treefort, Austin
- Genres: Country rock, alternative country
- Length: 39:57
- Label: ATO Records
- Producer: Salim Nourallah

Old 97's chronology
Old 97's & Waylon Jennings (2013)	Most Messed Up (2014)	Graveyard Whistling (2017)

Professional ratings
Aggregate scores
Source	Rating
Metacritic	(77%)
Review scores
Source	Rating
Allmusic	4/5 stars
The A.V. Club	B−
Cuepoint (Expert Witness)	A
Paste	8.2/10
Pitchfork Media	6.4/10
PopMatters	8/10 stars

Most Messed Up is the tenth studio album by American country/rock band Old 97's, first released on April 29, 2014 (see 2014 in music).

== Track listing ==
All tracks by Rhett Miller, Ken Bethea, Murry Hammond and Philip Peeples except where noted.

1. "Longer Than You've Been Alive" - 5:52
2. "Give It Time" - 3:23
3. "Let's Get Drunk & Get It On" - 3:03
4. "This Is The Ballad" - 2:39
5. "Wheels Off" - 3:05
6. "Nashville" (Miller, Bethea, Hammond, Peeples, Jon McElroy) - 2:35
7. "Wasted" - 2:53
8. "Guadalajara" - 2:52
9. "The Disconnect" - 4:00
10. "Ex Of All You See" - 2:52
11. "Intervention" - 3:49
12. "Most Messed Up" - 2:48

== Personnel ==
Old 97's

- Rhett Miller - lead vocals, acoustic guitar
- Murry Hammond - bass, backing vocals
- Ken Bethea - lead guitar
- Philip Peeples - drums, percussion

Additional Musicians

- Tommy Stinson - electric guitar, backing vocals
- Jon Rauhouse - pedal steel
