= The Instigator =

Studio album by Rhett Miller
- Released: September 24, 2002
- Genre: Pop rock, adult alternative
- Length: 40:47
- Label: Elektra
- Producer: Jon Brion

Rhett Miller chronology
Mythologies (1989)	The Instigator (2002)	The Believer (2006)

Professional ratings
Aggregate scores
Source	Rating
Metacritic	70/100
Review scores
Source	Rating
AllMusic	3/5 stars
The Austin Chronicle	3/5 stars
Pitchfork	6.9/10
Rolling Stone	2/5 stars
The Rolling Stone Album Guide	3.5/5 stars
The Village Voice	A−

The Instigator is the second studio album by American country/rock band performer, Rhett Miller, lead singer of the Old 97's. Miller's first album came more than a decade earlier. Miller is joined by idol Robyn Hitchcock on "Point Shirley" and the album's title comes from the song "The El."

== Track listing ==
All songs written by Rhett Miller, unless otherwise noted.

1. "Our Love" – 3:32
2. "This Is What I Do" – 3:10
3. "Come Around" – 3:41
4. "Things That Disappear" (Miller, Jon Brion) – 3:23
5. "World Inside The World" – 3:45
6. "Point Shirley" – 3:09
7. "Four-Eyed Girl" – 2:28
8. "Hover" – 2:50
9. "The El" – 3:09
10. "Your Nervous Heart" – 3:47
11. "I Want To Live" – 3:40
12. "Terrible Vision" – 4:06

Japan-only bonus tracks

13. "Erica the Beautiful"
14. "This Is What I Do (Too)"

== Personnel ==
Primary Musicians

- Rhett Miller - vocals, acoustic guitar, electric guitar on "Our Love", "The El"
- Jon Brion - backing vocals, electric guitar, bass, drums, piano, acoustic guitar, dobro on "Point Shirley", upright piano on "Four Eyed Girl", "Hover", B-3 organ on "Four Eyed Girl", vibraphone on "Hover", baritone guitar on "The El", "Your Nervous Heart", "talentmaker" on "World Inside the World"
- Josh Freese - drums
- Lenny Castro - percussion

Additional Musicians

- Robyn Hitchcock - backing vocals, electric guitar on "Point Shirley"
- Jim Keltner - drums on "Point Shirley", "Terrible Vision", percussion on "Terrible Vision"
- David Garza - backing vocals, bass on "Four Eyed Girl", "distorto" guitar on "The El"
- John Doe - backing vocals on "The El"
- Dan McCaroll - drums on "The El"
- Chrissy Guerrero - backing vocals on "Terrible Vision"
- Karen Kilgarriff - backing vocals on "Terrible Vision"
