= Early Tracks (EP) =

EP by Old 97's
- Released: 2000
- Recorded: Attica Studio in Chicago, IL
- Genre: Country rock, alternative country
- Length: 25:10
- Label: Bloodshot Records
- Producer: Old 97's and Chuck Uchida

Old 97's chronology
Fight Songs (1999)	Early Tracks (2000)	Satellite Rides (2001)

Early Tracks is an EP collection of unreleased early recordings by American country/rock band Old 97's. The EP contains four songs from two early singles as well as four more from the Wreck Your Life recording sessions.

Mark Asch of the Portland Press Herald gave the album an A rating, noting that instead of the "nonstop hellfire of their early days", the music in this release showcased itself as "musically knowledgeable, adept and wide-ranging" that represented the overall evolution of the country-rock scene at the time.

== Track listing ==
All tracks by Old 97's

1. "Ray Charles" – 3:15
2. "Crying Drunk" – 3:14 (from "Crying Drunk" single)
3. "Harold's Super Service" – 2:25
4. "W-I-F-E" (Pedal Steel Version) – 3:47 (from "Eyes For You" single)
5. "Por Favor" – 3:36
6. "Sound of Running" – 3:03
7. "Eyes For You" – 2:56 (from "Eyes For You" single)
8. "Let the Train Blow the Whistle" – 2:54 (from "Crying Drunk" single)

== Personnel ==
- Ken Bethea – electric guitar
- Murry Hammond – bass, vocals
- Rhett Miller – acoustic guitar, vocals
- Old 97's – producer
- Philip Peeples – drums
- Chuck Uchida – producer, engineer
