= Bedwetter =

A bedwetter is a person who urinates in their sleep.

Bedwetter may also refer to:

- The Bedwetter, memoir by actress and comedian Sarah Silverman 2010
- Travis Miller (musician), releasing music in 2017 as Bedwetter
- Bedwetter (band), San Antonio band formed by John Dufilho, Jason Garner and Colin Jones
- Bedwetters (band), Estonian pop punk band formed in September 2004
