= Bad Livers =

American band

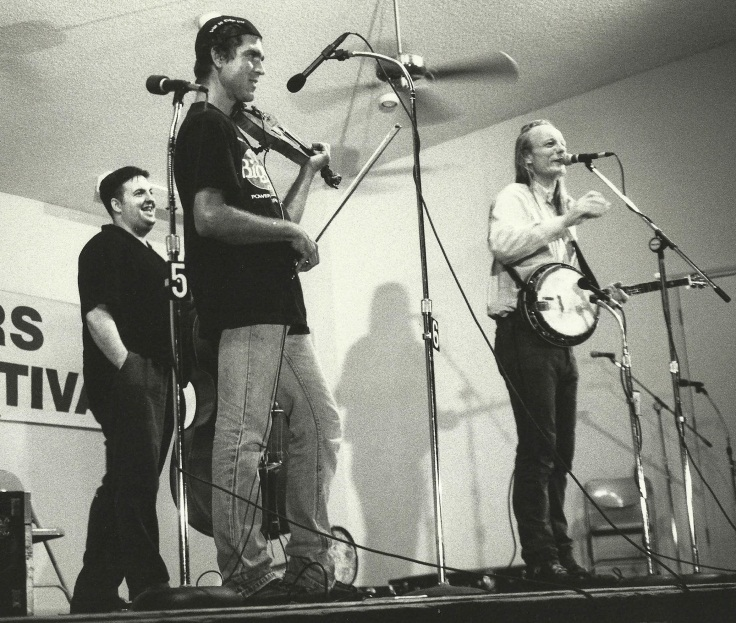
- The Bad Livers on stage at Old Settlers' Park, Round Rock, Texas, October 7, 1994. Left to right: Mark Rubin, Ralph White, Danny Barnes.

Background information
- Origin: Austin, Texas, U.S.
- Genres: Old-time, country, bluegrass, folk, blues, gospel, polka, folk punk
- Years active: 1990–2000
- Labels: Quarterstick, Sugar Hill

The Bad Livers were an American band from Austin, Texas whose inventive musical style defied attempts to categorize them according to existing genres. Their influences included bluegrass, folk, punk, and other musical styles. The original lineup, formed in 1990, included Danny Barnes on banjo, guitar and resonator guitar, Mark Rubin on upright bass and tuba, and Ralph White III on fiddle and accordion. Barnes composed the majority of the group's original songs. When White left the group at the end of 1996, he was briefly replaced by Bob Grant on mandolin and guitar. Barnes and Rubin then continued to perform and record as a duo until unofficially dissolving the band in 2000. The band has neither toured nor recorded since then, but Barnes and Rubin have played a few live shows with Grant in 2008, 2009, and 2014.

The Bad Livers' music has often been cited for its influence on other groups, creating what The Austin Chronicle described as "an impressive legacy". The Stranger credited them with "revitalizing roots music", and, according to the San Francisco Chronicle, "The Bad Livers helped open the way for old-time and bluegrass bands of today".

== History ==
The Bad Livers formed in 1990, when Barnes "came up with this idea that it would be great to have a small-format acoustic band that could play different kinds of music [at a] virtuoso level, where they could play any kind of music". He began playing with Rubin and White, and the trio adopted the name Bad Livers in the summer of 1990. They began playing frequently in Austin, including a weekly set at the Saxon Pub. A typical set in 1991 included a wide variety of styles and periods of music, as Rubin later explained: "We were doing Mississippi John Hurt, gospel tunes, Captain Beefheart—anything, really, but it was Motörhead or the Misfits that caught on."

Imprecise descriptions of the Bad Livers' music abounded: "thrash-grass", "acoustic bluegrass with a punk death wish", "something called 'contemporary bluegrass,'" and "acoustic-metal-bluegrass", although these same sources would cite the band as "much-lauded" and note that "the musicians can really play". The recurrence of the term bluegrass, however bizarrely it was modified, along with counter-assessments of them as "good, faithful traditionalists" who "preserve the spirit as well as the technique of old-timey folk music", created a generic perplexity that led Austin country legend Don Walser to observe that the only question he couldn't answer was what kind of music the Bad Livers played.

Barnes insisted that the Bad Livers were not a bluegrass band, but had created an original sound: "This isn't bluegrass and it isn't this or that. It's Bad Liver music. We end up making our own thing." Barnes' original compositions were featured on their first album, Delusions of Banjer, released in 1992 on Quarterstick Records and produced by Paul Leary of the Butthole Surfers. The album was praised for "Barnes's strong material, as well as the group's tight musical interaction". Barnes credited the latter with improving the former: "The musical telepathy is really good. I can sort of tailor-make a song to the guys' playing, make the song fit what they're doing, since I write most of the material."

Rubin claimed that they had decided to incorporate the accordion and tuba into the band to counteract their growing popularity, but to no avail: their audience continued to widen and more critics saw beyond the gimmicky descriptions to the band's innovation and skill. The Washington Post described them as "truly great", The Times-Picayune praised their "serious musicianship" and Barnes' "soulful, urgent lead vocals", while Rolling Stone admired their "striking blend of virtuoso flash and poignant simplicity". Don McLeese of the Austin American-Statesman twice described the Bad Livers as "Austin's best band" and raved of one live show: "The uncommon telepathy enjoyed by Danny Barnes, Mark Rubin and Ralph White makes the band's frenetic acoustic interplay sound like the work of a six-armed, multistringed monster." Barnes was voted "Best Player of Any Other Instrument" for the banjo at the Austin Music Awards in 1991 and 1992, and the Bad Livers were voted "Best None of the Above" for four consecutive years from 1991 to 1994.

The Bad Livers' second album, Horses in the Mines, was produced by Barnes and released on Quarterstick in 1994. In his review, McLeese admired them as "a band drawing from the wellspring of tradition to create something fresh, vital and original". Süddeutsche Zeitung found that the record "sounded quite authentic—almost as if it had long held a place in the Library of Congress". Raoul Hernández poetically concurred, saying that the record sounded "like a bunch of skeletons cackling into the sole microphone that dangles from the outhouse ceiling".

The Bad Livers spent 1995 and 1996 touring and working on side projects as well as looking for a new label to release their next album. Finally the band signed a three-album deal with Sugar Hill Records, which had more experience than Quarterstick at "selling banjo records". Their first album for the label, Hogs on the Highway, was released along with the information that White had decided to leave the band. It was announced that he was to be replaced by Bob Grant, though Grant's tenure with the band did not last long. Both White and Grant appeared on Hogs on the Highway, which received enthusiastic reviews from Sing Out!, praising Barnes' "quirky and inventive" original songs, and the Old-Time Herald, admiring the "considerable skill" with which Barnes crafted his lyrics. The Austin American-Statesman agreed that Barnes was "an entirely underrated songwriter" as well as a "banjo wizard", while The Washington Post lauded his "timeless, deadpan voice". The Sydney Morning Herald was appreciative of the "beautifully controlled ambience" of the entire album.

Shortly after the album's release, Barnes moved from Austin to Port Hadlock, Washington, though he and Rubin continued to work closely together on the score for the Richard Linklater film The Newton Boys as well as the Bad Livers' next album. Although the soundtrack was admired by The Village Voice and Entertainment Weekly as well as the Austin papers, the film did not fare well at the box office, and the soundtrack album did not sell well. The Bad Livers' second album for Sugar Hill, Industry and Thrift, was released in September 1998 with only Barnes and Rubin credited as members of the band, though the album features various guest musicians, including members of Rubin's side project, Rubinchik's Orkestyr, who are featured on the track "A Yid Ist Geboren inz Oklahoma". The album garnered positive reviews, and the Chicago Tribune selected it as the best bluegrass album of 1998, while The Times of London admired its "genuine originality". Industry and Thrift did not receive as much attention from the press as Hogs on the Highway had, however, and as Barnes lamented, the album "fell off the face of the earth".

The Bad Livers' final album, Blood and Mood, was released in February 2000 and featured, as The Austin Chronicle noted with astonishment: "Electric punk rock, sample-based tunes with drum tracks, and a shocking scarcity of juiced-up banjo playing". The Independent named it "the leftfield album of the week" and found that it "brims with enthusiastic ideas", while The Washington Post was puzzled but invigorated by a live show supporting the album, concluding that it had been "Fascinating. Even refreshing". Although it left No Depression depressed, Daniel Wolff found the album to be uniquely evocative of a "rural eccentricity" that had not yet been extinguished and formed a kind of continuum with punk and old-time country: "Either the Bad Livers pick up where 'I Wish I Were a Mole in the Ground' left off, or Bascom Lunsford discovered the punk aesthetic in the 1920s." Blood and Mood did not sell well, and by the summer of 2000 the Bad Livers appeared to be "over for good".

The Bad Livers were inducted into the Austin Music Hall of Fame in 2007.

== Discography ==
- Dust on the Bible (1991, self-released cassette/1994, Quarterstick cassette-only re-release/1999, Quarterstick CD re-release)
- Lust for Life/Jeffro's Dream (1991, Fist Puppet vinyl 7" single)
- The Golden Years (1992, Quarterstick vinyl EP)
- Delusions of Banjer (1992, Quarterstick vinyl LP, CD and cassette)
- Horses in the Mines (1994, Quarterstick vinyl LP, CD and cassette)
- Hogs on the Highway (1997, Sugar Hill CD)
- Industry and Thrift (1998, Sugar Hill CD)
- The Newton Boys (Soundtrack) (1998, Sony CD)
- Blood and Mood (2000, Sugar Hill CD)
- The Ridgetop Sessions (2000, Lumpydisc CD)
