= Wreck Your Life =

Studio album by Old 97's
- Released: October 3, 1995
- Recorded: Attica in Chicago, IL
- Genre: Alternative country
- Length: 49:40
- Label: Bloodshot Records
- Producer: Chuck Uchida

Old 97's chronology
Hitchhike To Rhome (1994)	Wreck Your Life (1995)	Too Far To Care (1997)

Professional ratings
Review scores
Source	Rating
AllMusic	4/5 stars
Orlando Sentinel	5/5 stars
Country Standard Time	Positive
Slant	4/5 stars

Wreck Your Life is the second studio album by American country/rock band Old 97's, first released on October 3, 1995 (see 1995 in music). The album's title comes from a Texas Department of Transportation bumper sticker with the slogan, "Don't Wreck Your Life". Drummer Philip Peeples removed the first word and applied the sticker to the band's touring van.

Wreck Your Life was the band's first professionally released album, released by Chicago alt-country label Bloodshot Records. The album contains many of the country and bar band elements absent from the later Elektra Records recordings. Four extra songs from these sessions, as well as two singles, were later combined by Bloodshot for the Early Tracks EP. Though the anticipation of the album was immense, the ratings were not very good.

"Doreen" is a re-recording from the band's first album, Hitchhike to Rhome, and an alternate take on "W-I-F-E" can be found on Early Tracks. "Big Brown Eyes" was featured in the series finale of Ned's Declassified School Survival Guide and was re-recorded for the band's next album, Too Far to Care.

The lead song, "Victoria", is a country ballad to Miller's ex-girlfriend, while "Doreen" refers to a memorable fan of Killbilly, a predecessor band featuring Miller and Hammond. "You Belong To My Heart" was made famous by Elvis Presley, while "My Sweet Blue-Eyed Darlin'" is by Bill Monroe. The Robert mentioned in "Big Brown Eyes" (as well as "Drowning In The Days") is Miller's boyhood friend, Robert Jenkins.

In 2009, Bloodshot reissued the album under the title Wreck Your Life... And Then Some: The Complete Bloodshot Recordings. The reissue contains not only the entire original album, but also other obscure songs the band recorded for Bloodshot.

== Musical style and composition ==
Wreck Your Life has been described as an alternative country album, taking elements from punk rock, bluegrass such as Bill Monroe, country rock, and traditional country music such as George Jones.

== Track listing ==
All songs by Rhett Miller, Ken Bethea, Murry Hammond and Philip Peeples, except where noted.

1. "Victoria" - 3:51
2. "The Other Shoe" - 2:58
3. "Doreen" - 3:43
4. "You Belong To My Heart" (Dora Luz and Agustín Lara; English lyrics: Ray Gilbert) - 3:05
5. "Big Brown Eyes" - 4:25
6. "Dressing Room Walls" - 3:55
7. "W-I-F-E" - 3:32
8. "Bel Air" - 4:05
9. "My Sweet Blue-Eyed Darlin'" (Bill Monroe; vocals by Murry Hammond) - 2:15
10. "Old Familiar Steam" - 3:58
11. "Over The Cliff" - 3:19 (Jon Langford)
12. "Goin', Goin', Gone" - 3:54

== Personnel ==
Old 97's are:

- Ken Bethea - electric guitar
- Murry Hammond - bass, vocals & banjo
- Rhett Miller - vocals & acoustic guitar
- Philip Peeples - trap kit

Additional performances

- Jon Langford - guitar on Doreen outro
- Chuck Uchida - power chords on Dressing Room Walls
- Don Walser - yodeling on Old Familiar Steam outro
