= Hogs on the Highway =

Studio album by Bad Livers
- Released: 1997
- Genres: Bluegrass, country folk
- Length: 44:58
- Label: Sugar Hill
- Producer: Danny Barnes

Bad Livers chronology
Horses in the Mines (1994)	Hogs on the Highway (1997)	Industry and Thrift (1998)

Hogs on the Highway is an album by the American band Bad Livers, released in 1997. The band's label, Sugar Hill, marketed the album to bluegrass audiences and college radio. Bad Livers supported the album with a North American tour.

== Production ==
The album was recorded over two months in Austin and San Marcos, Texas. Bob Grant replaced fiddler Ralph White, although both contributed to Hogs on the Highway. Steve James played mandolin on some of the tracks. Bass player Mike Rubin played tuba on "Lathe Crick". The band used a mbira on "Falling Down the Stairs (With a Pistol in My Hand)". Most of the songs were written by frontman Danny Barnes, who also produced. "Cluck Old Hen" is an interpretation of the traditional banjo song. "Saludamas a Tejas" is a version of the polka standard. Bad Livers included two unlisted tracks at the end of the album.

== Critical reception ==
Professional ratings
Review scores
Source	Rating
Chicago Tribune	3/4 stars
MusicHound Folk: The Essential Album Guide	3.5/5 stars
The Sydney Morning Herald	4/5 stars
USA Today	3/4 stars
The Virgin Encyclopedia of Nineties Music	3/5 stars

USA Today stated that "Bad Livers are a mix of sincerity and goofiness, capable of worthy homages to Hank Williams and Bill Monroe as well as outbreaks of punk anarchism." The Chicago Tribune called the album a "fleet-fingered swig of pinewood blues and ragged breakdowns", later noting that "it spills over with tubas, banjos and accordions, and is infused with elements of gospel and even a vague sort of hillbilly pop—it's the closest they've come to making an unselfconscious, truly grownup record." The Gazette determined that "although the Livers are very credible playing straight-ahead bluegrass, they're really a symbiotic, high-energy country roots band who can swing on a fiddle tune one minute, stomp the blues the next and bring it all together in a high-energy package".

The Sydney Morning Herald said that Bad Livers "have taken just about every conceivable left-field roots-country style and mixed up a tasty brew which drifts from Texas swing to jug band, bluegrass." The Santa Fe New Mexican noted that "the band's punk sensibilities come out in some of the goofball lyrics". The Houston Chronicle concluded that "Bad Livers are less disjointed 'thrash-grass' than they are faithful to the moonshine spirit of old-timey string bands such as Gid Tanner and the Skillet Lickers." The Houston Press listed Hogs on the Highway among the best Texas albums of 1997.

== Track listing ==
No.	Title	Length
1.	"Hogs on the Highway"	3:24
2.	"Lathe Crick"	4:30
3.	"Counting the Crossties"	4:13
4.	"Shufflin' to Memphis"	3:16
5.	"Dallas, Texas"	3:39
6.	"Corn Liquor Made a Fool Out of Me"	2:45
7.	"Saludamas a Tejas"	3:20
8.	"The National Blues"	4:18
9.	"Mr. Modal"	1:10
10.	"My Old Man"	3:25
11.	"Cluck Old Hen"	1:57
12.	"News Not the Weather"	2:29
13.	"Falling Down the Stairs (With a Pistol in My Hand)"	6:32
Total length:		44:58
