= Horses in the Mines =

Studio album by Bad Livers
- Released: 1994
- Label: Quarterstick
- Producer: Danny Barnes

Bad Livers chronology
The Golden Years (1992)	Horses in the Mines (1994)	Hogs on the Highway (1997)

Horses in the Mines is the second album by the American band Bad Livers, released in 1994. It was released a month after their gospel album, Dust on the Bible, was reissued. Horses in the Mines was Bad Livers' second album for Quarterstick Records; Bad Livers signed with Quarterstick, in part, because major labels considered the band to be a novelty. The band supported the album with a North American tour.

== Production ==
The album was produced by bandmember Danny Barnes. It was recorded on an 8-track in an Austin woodshed, in the fall of 1993. It was mastered at Abbey Road Studios. The packaging is reminiscent of an old Folkways Records album. Horses in the Mines emphasizes the band's original material, with most of the songs written and sung by Barnes; Barnes was influenced by old gospel songs and conversations with elderly acquaintances. Steve James appears on Horses in the Mines. "New Bad Liver Singer" contains vocals by Barnes's dog.

== Critical reception ==
Professional ratings
Review scores
Source	Rating
AllMusic	3/5 stars
The Encyclopedia of Popular Music	3/5 stars
MusicHound Folk: The Essential Album Guide	4/5 stars

Trouser Press called the album "more reflective, less rollicking than its predecessor," and praised the "depth and sincerity." The Austin American-Statesman determined that, "where the band's blitzkrieg interplay once left no space unfilled, the title track is brooding, halting, conveying as much sense of dread in the intervals between the notes as it does in the lyrics," and deemed the album "music that is sui generis—not bluegrass, not old-timey, but primarily punk in the sense that punk once meant freedom to do anything."

Rolling Stone stated that Bad Livers' "take on America's musical heritage is both obsessively pure and free-form." The St. Paul Pioneer Press labeled Horses in the Mines "authentic, old-timey porch music fueled by banjos, fiddles, empty whiskey bottles, [and] barking dogs." The Boston Herald listed the album among the best "unknown" albums of 1994.

AllMusic noted that, "while it has a largely traditional sound, its production and experimental tendencies are likely to further alienate any potential traditional bluegrass fans they may have courted."

== Track listing ==
No.	Title	Length
1.	"Where They Do Not Know My Name"
2.	"Turpentine Willie"
3.	"Old Folk's Shuffle"
4.	"Horses in the Mines"
5.	"Time and Time Again"
6.	"Clawhammer Fish"
7.	"New Bad Liver Singer"
8.	"High, Lonesome, Dead and Gone"
9.	"Blue Ridge Express"
10.	"Shot at a Bird, Hit Me a Stump"
11.	"Chainsaw Therapy"
12.	"He Didn't Say a Word"
13.	"Puke Grub"
14.	"Yearning"
15.	"Stevejames"
16.	"Let's Forgive Each Other"
