= Nicholas Altobelli =

American indie folk singer

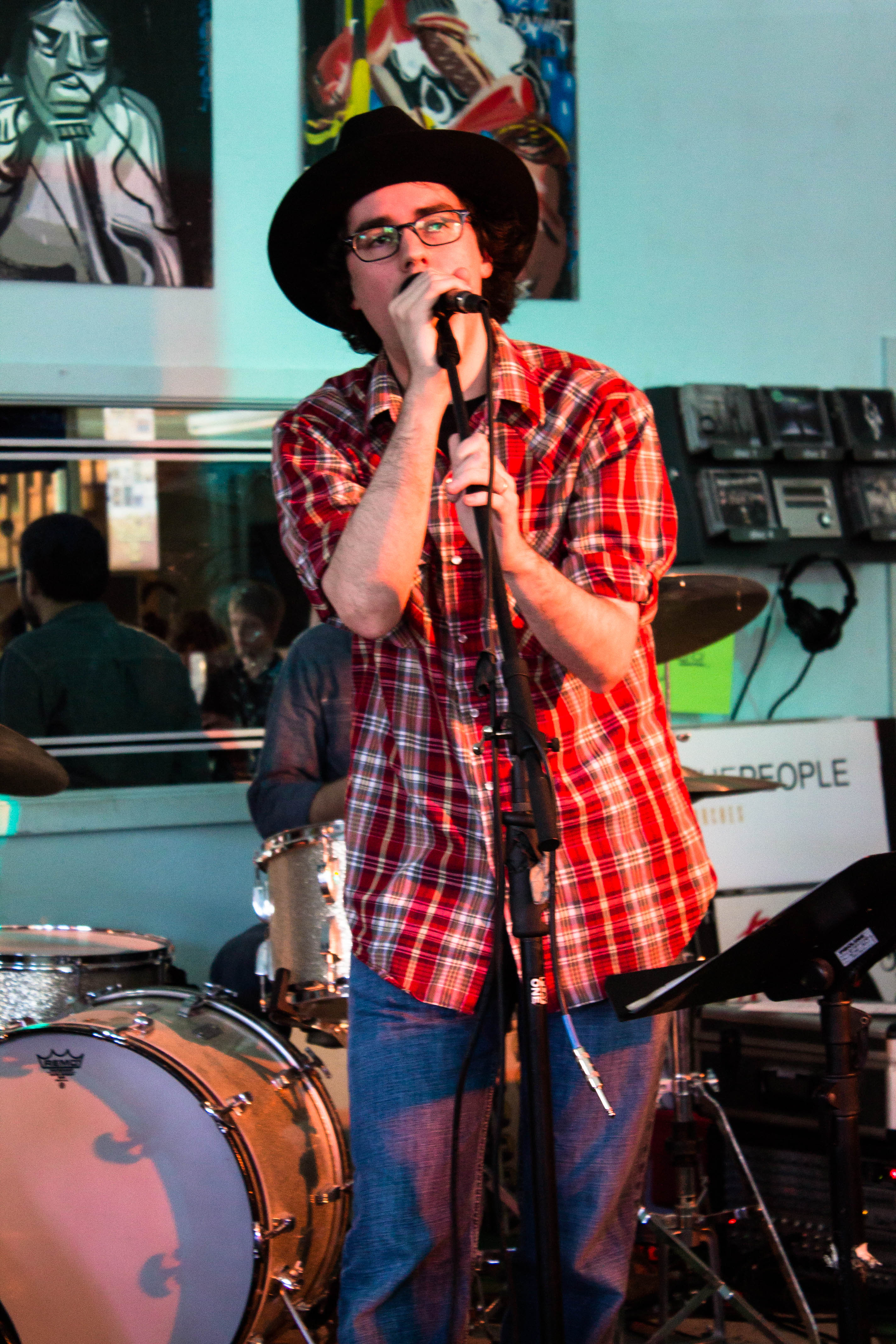
- Nicholas Altobelli at Good Records in Dallas, Texas (2013)

Background information
- Born: February 11, 1985 (age 40); Fountain Valley, California, United States
- Origin: Dallas, Texas, United States
- Genres: Folk pop, Americana
- Occupation: Singer-songwriter
- Years active: 2008-present
- Labels: Dalton
- Website: www.nicholasaltobelli.com

Nicholas Altobelli (born February 11, 1985) is an American singer and songwriter based in Dallas, Texas.

== Career ==
Altobelli's debut self-released album, Waiting for the Flowers to Bloom, was released during the winter of 2008. His self-released follow up, The Regulator, was released during the spring of 2010. Shortly after the release of The Regulator, Altobelli launched his own label, Dalton Records, where he released 2011's Radio Waves and Telephone Wire. The album featured a duet with former Whiskeytown member, Caitlin Cary. Fort Worth Star Telegram/dfw.com ranked Radio Waves and Telephone Wire Number 7 for its top ten albums of 2011. Later that year he was nominated for solo act of the year by the Dallas Observer.

In the spring and summer of 2012, Altobelli went into the studio with producer, Salim Nourallah, to work on a brand new album. Unlike his previous albums, this album tends to stray away from the acoustic folk that he is known for. The album features John Dufilho and Grammy winner and nominee Joe Reyes as well as many other Dallas musicians. Without a Home was released on February 26, 2013.

Altobelli released Mesocyclone EP on August 5, 2014.

Altobelli announced in April 2015 that his next full-length album, Searching Through That Minor Key, will be released on July 7, 2015

After a brief hiatus of releasing music, Altobelli returned with 2019's Vertigo.

During the COVID-19 pandemic, Altobelli released a collection of acoustic songs called Kids

== Discography ==
- Waiting for the Flowers to Bloom (2008)
- The Regulator (2010)
- Radio Waves and Telephone Wire (2011)
- Without a Home (2013)
- Mesocyclone [EP] (2014)
- Searching Through That Minor Key (2015)
- Vertigo (2019)
- Kids (2020)
- Technicolor Hearts (TBD)
