= Mimeograph (EP) =

EP by Old 97's
- Released: 6 July 2010
- Genre: Alternative country
- Length: 15:11
- Label: New West Records

Old 97's chronology
Blame It On Gravity (2008)	Mimeograph (2010)	The Grand Theatre, Volume One (2010)

Professional ratings
Review scores
Source	Rating
Robert Christgau	B+

Mimeograph is an EP consisting of recordings by American country/rock band Old 97's. It was released on July 6, 2010. The EP contains four cover songs, originally recorded by The Rolling Stones, The Fratellis, R.E.M., and David Bowie.

== Track listing ==
1. "Rocks Off" (Jagger/Richards) - 4:24
2. "For The Girl" (John Lawler) - 2:33
3. "Driver 8" (Bill Berry, Peter Buck, Mike Mills, Michael Stipe) - 3:22
4. "Five Years" (David Bowie) - 4:52

== Personnel ==
Old 97's

- Ken Bethea – electric guitar, backing vocals on "Five Years"
- Murry Hammond – bass, backing vocals
- Rhett Miller – guitars, vocals
- Philip Peeples – drums, percussion

Additional Musicians

- Rip Rowan - piano and backing vocals on "Rocks Off" and "Five Years"
- Salim Nourallah - backing vocals on "Five Years"
- Patrick Brink - trumpet on "Rocks Off"
- David Butler - trombone on "Rocks Off"
