= Hit by a Train: The Best of Old 97's =

Hit By A Train: The Best of Old 97's

Greatest hits album by Old 97's
- Released: June 20, 2006
- Genre: Alternative country
- Length: 64:08
- Label: Rhino Entertainment
- Producer: Mike Phegley

Old 97's chronology
Alive & Wired (2005)	Hit By A Train: The Best of Old 97's (2006)	Blame It on Gravity (2008)

Professional ratings
Review scores
Source	Rating
AllMusic	(4/5) link
Pitchfork Media	(8.2/10) link

Hit By A Train: The Best of Old 97's is a best-of compilation album by American country/rock band Old 97's, first released on June 20, 2006.

== Track listing ==
1. "Stoned"
2. "Cryin' Drunk"
3. "Doreen" (rock version)
4. "Victoria"
5. "Timebomb"
6. "Niteclub"
7. "Four Leaf Clover"
8. "El Paso"
9. "Jagged"
10. "Lonely Holiday"
11. "Murder (Or A Heart Attack)"
12. "Valentine"
13. "The Villain"
14. "King Of All Of The World"
15. "Question"
16. "Rollerskate Skinny"
17. "Barrier Reef" (Live)
18. "Nineteen" (Live)

== Personnel ==
Old 97's

- Rhett Miller - vocals, guitar
- Murry Hammond - bass, vocals
- Ken Bethea - guitar
- Phillip Peeples - drums, percussion

Additional Musicians

- Chuck Langford - guitar on Doreen outro
- Jon Rauhouse - pedal steel, banjo
- Wally Gagel - piano, Mellotron, percussion
- Jon Brion - Vox organ on "Murder (Or A Heart Attack)"
- Andrew Williams - odds and ends
