= Hitchhike to Rhome =

Hitchhike To Rhome

Studio album by Old 97's
- Released: 1994
- Recorded: Crystal Clear Sound in Dallas, TX
- Genre: Country rock
- Length: 59:10
- Label: Big Iron
- Producer: Alan Wooley

Old 97's chronology
Hitchhike To Rhome (1994)	Wreck Your Life (1996)

Professional ratings
Review scores
Source	Rating
AllMusic	3.5/5 stars
The Austin Chronicle	4/4 stars
Elmore Magazine	72/100
PopMatters	7/10
The New Rolling Stone Album Guide	2.5/5 stars

Hitchhike to Rhome is the first studio album by American country/rock band Old 97's, released in 1994. The title comes from the song "Stoned", and refers to Rhome, Texas.

The lyrics make numerous references to the band's Dallas, Texas, environs. "504" refers to the area code for New Orleans (see area code 504). The Robert mentioned in "Drowning In The Days" (as well as "Big Brown Eyes") is Miller's boyhood friend, Robert Jenkins. "Miss Molly" recalls Miller and Hammond's previous work with bluegrass band, Killbilly, with "Doreen" referring to a memorable fan of that band and referencing New York City for the first of many times.

"4 Leaf Clover" was re-recorded as "Four Leaf Clover" with Exene Cervenka for the band's 1997 album, Too Far To Care. Live favorite, "Wish The Worst", is the only Old 97's song with lead guitar played by someone other than Ken Bethea. "Mama Tried" is a Merle Haggard standard and is a favorite live song for bassist Hammond. "Tupelo County Jail" is a hidden track, playing after a long pause at the end of the album.

A 20th-anniversary, 2-disc special edition of the album was released on November 17, 2014 by Omnivore Recordings. The special edition contains a separate disc of 12 rare and unreleased tracks.

== Track listing ==
(all songs composed by Rhett Miller except where noted)

1. "St. Ignatius" - 4:14
2. "504" - 3:39
3. "Drowning in the Days" - 4:02 (Miller/Hammond)
4. "Miss Molly" - 2:18 (Cindy Walker)
5. "Dancing with Tears" - 2:55 (Joe Burke/Al Dubin)
6. "4 Leaf Clover" - 3:14
7. "Wish the Worst" - 4:32
8. "Old 97's Theme" - 1:42
9. "Doreen" (bluegrass version)- 3:18 (Miller/Hammond)
10. "Hands Off" - 4:35
11. "Mama Tried" - 2:29 (Merle Haggard)
12. "Stoned" - 3:59
13. "If My Heart Was a Car" - 3:29
14. "Desperate Times" - 3:46
15. "Ken's Polka Thing" - 13:34 (Bonus track "Tupelo County Jail" after a long pause) (Ken Bethea/Webb Pierce)

== Personnel ==
Old 97's:

- Ken Bethea - electric guitar & accordion
- Murry Hammond - bass, vocals & banjo
- Rhett Miller - vocals & acoustic guitar
- Philip Peeples - drums

Additional Musicians

- Andy Owens - banjo on "Doreen" and "If My Heart Was a Car" and mandolin on "Doreen"
- Reggie Rueffer - fiddle on "Hands Off"
- Clark Vogeler - 1st electric guitar on "Wish the Worst"
- Alan Wooley - 2nd electric guitar on "Wish the Worst"
