= The Believer (Rhett Miller album) =

Studio album by Rhett Miller
- Released: February 28, 2006
- Genre: Pop rock, alternative country
- Label: Verve Forecast
- Producer: George Drakoulias

Rhett Miller chronology
The Instigator (2002)	The Believer (2006)	Rhett Miller (2009)

Professional ratings
Review scores
Source	Rating
AllMusic	3/5 stars
Robert Christgau	A−

The Believer is a solo album by American country/rock musician Rhett Miller, lead singer of the Old 97's.

== Track listing ==
All songs written by Rhett Miller unless otherwise noted.

1. "My Valentine"
2. "Help Me, Suzanne"
3. "Meteor Shower" (Miller, Jerry Marotta)
4. "Brand New Way"
5. "Ain't That Strange"
6. "I Believe She's Lying" (Jon Brion, Aimee Mann)
7. "Fireflies"
8. "Singular Girl" (Miller, Ken Bethea, Murry Hammond, Philip Peeples) (newly recorded from Satellite Rides bonus CD)
9. "I'm with Her" (Miller, Andrew Williams)
10. "Delicate"
11. "The Believer" (for Elliott Smith)
12. "Question" (Miller, Ken Bethea, Murry Hammond, Philip Peeples, Simon Ford) (newly recorded from Satellite Rides)
