= Drag It Up =

Studio album by Old 97's
- Released: July 27, 2004
- Recorded: Soil of the South (San Diego, California); Dreamland (Hurley, New York)
- Genre: Country rock, alternative country
- Length: 48:19
- Label: New West Records
- Producer: Mark Neill

Old 97's chronology
Satellite Rides (2001)	Drag It Up (2004)	Alive & Wired (2005)

Professional ratings
Review scores
Source	Rating
AllMusic	3.5/5 stars
Robert Christgau	(3-star Honorable Mention)
The Encyclopedia of Popular Music	3/5 stars
Pitchfork	7/10
Rolling Stone	2/5 stars

Drag It Up is a studio album by American country/rock band Old 97's, released in 2004 (see 2004 in music). The album's title comes from the fourth track, "Smokers."

The album peaked at #120 on the Billboard 200.

== Critical reception ==
No Depression wrote that "at least half the record is subdued in tone and tempo. If the overall result isn’t quite as rawk, well, the sound suits the songs, and that makes all the difference." The Hartford Courant wrote that "the songwriting is only fair, and the murky songs sound like they were recorded in a tin shed during a heavy downpour." The Cleveland Scene called the album "joyous alt-country."

== Track listing ==
All tracks by Rhett Miller, Ken Bethea, Murry Hammond and Philip Peeples.

1. "Won't Be Home" - 4:48
2. "Moonlight" - 3:40
3. "Borrowed Bride" - 2:08
4. "Smokers" (vocals by Murry Hammond) - 3:52
5. "Coahuila" (vocals by Ken Bethea) - 2:27
6. "Blinding Sheets Of Rain" - 3:20
7. "Valium Waltz" - 4:39
8. "In The Satellite Rides A Star" (vocals by Murry Hammond) - 4:40
9. "The New Kid" - 3:41
10. "Bloomington" - 3:27
11. "Adelaide" - 3:29
12. "Friends Forever" - 3:08
13. "No Mother" - 4:59

== Personnel ==
Old 97's

- Rhett Miller - lead vocals, rhythm guitar, backup vocals on "Smokers" and "Satellite," additional backup vocals on "Coahulia"
- Murry Hammond - bass, backing vocals, harmonium on "No Mother," electric guitar on "New Kid," lead guitar and tambourine on "Bloomington," lead vocals on "Smokers," vocals, acoustic guitar and shaker on "Satellite"
- Ken Bethea - lead guitar, accordion, no. 2 plectrum on "No Mother," lead vocals on "Coahulia"
- Philip Peeples - drums, shakers, tambourines
- Ken, Murry, Rhett and Philip - group backup vocals on "No Mother," "Friends Forever" and "Smokers"

Additional Musicians

- Craig Packham - tambourine on "New Kid"
- Archie Thompson - piano on "Borrowed Bride"
- Mitch Manker - trumpet on "Adelaide," appears courtesy of the Ray Charles Orchestra
- Sarah Neill - age 2, backward piano on "Valium Waltz"
- Chris Lawrence - pedal steel guitar on "Moonlight" and "Blinding Sheets of Rain"
