= Killbilly =

US musical group (1987–1994)

- Origin: Dallas, Texas
- Genres: Bluegrass music, punk rock
- Years active: 1987–1994
- Labels: Flying Fish Records, Crystal Clear Records
- Past members: Alan Wooley, Craig "Niteman" Taylor, Stephen Trued, Harris "Stealth" Kirby, Richard Hunter, Michael Schwedler, Rhett Miller, Murry Hammond, Mark Rubin, Danny Barnes

Killbilly was a Dallas, Texas-based band active from 1987 to 1994, which described its music as being a mixture of bluegrass and punk. Critics have variously described the band's style as a "fusion of bluegrass and shred metal", and as "a genuine bluegrass band playing straight, fast and loud." The Dallas Observer's Robert Wilonsky described the band as "irreplaceable" and their breakup in 1994 as the "end of an era".

== History ==
Killbilly originated in 1986, when its guitarist, Alan Wooley, wrote and recorded the cassette "Foggy Mountain Anarchy" entirely by himself. At the time, Wooley was performing with the punk rock band the White Shapes. He then sent the cassette to KNON DJ Craig "Niteman" Taylor, who liked it so much that he called Wooley to invite his entire band to come on his show to perform. Wooley then admitted that he had no "band", and that he had recorded the album by himself, to which Taylor replied, given that Taylor knew how to sing and play harmonica, they should make Killbilly a real band. Wooley and Taylor went on to do so. They played their first show on March 12, 1987. The band's lineup changed, but its core members were Wooley, Taylor, singer and banjo player Stephen Trued, acoustic guitarist, mandolin player, and singer Harris Kirby, bassist Richard Hunter, and drummer Michael Schwedler. After producing cassettes and selling them at shows, they released their major label debut album, Foggy Mountain Anarchy, in June 1992. In 1994, the band released Stranger in this Place on Crystal Clear Records. Like their previous album, Stranger in this Place was internationally distributed. The band broke up due to financial insolvency in 1994, and played their last show on November 4 that year.

== Discography ==
=== Studio albums ===
- Stranger in this Place (Flying Fish Records, 1992)
- Foggy Mountain Anarchy (Crystal Clear Records, 1994)

=== Cassettes ===
- Alive in the City of Hate in the Lone Star State (4 Dots, 1990)
- Bootleg '91 (1991)
