= Satellite Rides =

Studio album by Old 97's
- Released: March 20, 2001
- Studio: Peternales Studios in Austin, Texas
- Genres: Alternative country; power pop; pop rock
- Length: 44:26
- Label: Elektra
- Producer: Wally Gagel

Old 97's chronology
Early Tracks EP (2000)	Satellite Rides (2001)	Drag It Up (2004)

Professional ratings
Review scores
Source	Rating
AllMusic	4/5 stars
Christgau's Consumer Guide	A
Entertainment Weekly	B+
Los Angeles Times	3.5/4 stars
Rolling Stone	3.5/5 stars
The Rolling Stone Album Guide	4.5/5 stars
USA Today	3/4 stars

Satellite Rides is the fifth studio album by American country/rock band Old 97's, first released in the second quarter of 2001 (see 2001 in music). Though track 9, "Weightless", refers to outer space while the chorus croons "ride on, ride on" to an unspecified audience, the album's title does not appear in the lyrics but was later used for the song "In The Satellite Rides A Star" on the band's follow-up album, 2004's Drag It Up.

Lyrically, the songs feature singer and songwriter Rhett Miller writing about characters other than himself, although personal references remain. "Rollerskate Skinny" is a song about actress Winona Ryder, whom Miller very briefly dated; the title refers to Holden Caulfield's description of his sister in the novel The Catcher in the Rye, while "Buick City Complex" refers to workers affected by General Motors' decision to close its failed mega-factory in Flint, Michigan. Miller wrote the song "Am I Too Late" for his grandmother, Ahnece Pugh. The album features two songs sung by bassist Murry Hammond, "Up The Devil's Pay" and "Can't Get A Line".

"Question" is often performed live with a French verse. Miller re-recorded "Question" and "Singular Girl" with a full band for his 2006 solo album, The Believer.

"Satellite Riders" is also a pseudonym under which the band plays, including a show at the Tractor Tavern in Seattle, Washington on August 31, 2008.

== Soundtrack appearances ==
"Question" was used in a commercial for Fuse TV network in the United States. It featured sock puppets. "Question" appeared in two TV proposals: in Scrubs, season episode 15, "His Story," when Turk proposes to Carla, originally broadcast on January 30, 2003, and in Ed, season 4 episode 9, "The Proposal," when Ed proposes to Carol, originally broadcast on November 19, 2003. "Question" was also used in the season 1 episode 19, "Young Hearts Spark Fire" of Scorpion, originally broadcast on March 23, 2015.

"King of All the World" was used in the film Out Cold.

== Track listing ==
All songs written by the Old 97's.

=== Original release ===
No.	Title	Lead vocals	Length
1.	"King of All the World"		2:52
2.	"Rollerskate Skinny"		3:52
3.	"Buick City Complex"		3:39
4.	"Bird in a Cage"		3:48
5.	"Up the Devil's Pay"	Murry Hammond	3:49
6.	"What I Wouldn't Do"		3:47
7.	"Question"		2:15
8.	"Am I Too Late"		2:32
9.	"Weightless"		3:45
10.	"Can't Get a Line"	Murry Hammond	2:52
11.	"Designs on You"		3:49
12.	"Book of Poems"		3:32
13.	"Nervous Guy"		3:56

=== Bonus EP ===
Early pressings of the album included an EP of five songs recorded live at Fantasy Studios in Berkeley, California on September 25, 1999 for local radio station, KFOG, and one leftover studio track.

No.	Title	Length
1.	"Barrier Reef" (live)	3:47
2.	"Victoria" (live)	4:02
3.	"Nineteen" (live)	3:27
4.	"Timebomb" (live)	3:37
5.	"Valentine" (live)	3:18
6.	"Singular Girl"	4:15

== Personnel ==
- Ken Bethea – electric, acoustic, 6 string & 12 string guitars, slide guitar, lap steel, accordion
- Murry Hammond – bass guitar, backing vocals, lead vocals on "Can't Get a Line" and "Up the Devil's Pay"
- Rhett Miller – electric, acoustic, 6 string & 12 string guitars, mouth trumpet, vocals
- Philip Peeples – drums, shakers, maracas, tambourine
