= Mark Rubin (musician) =

American country musician

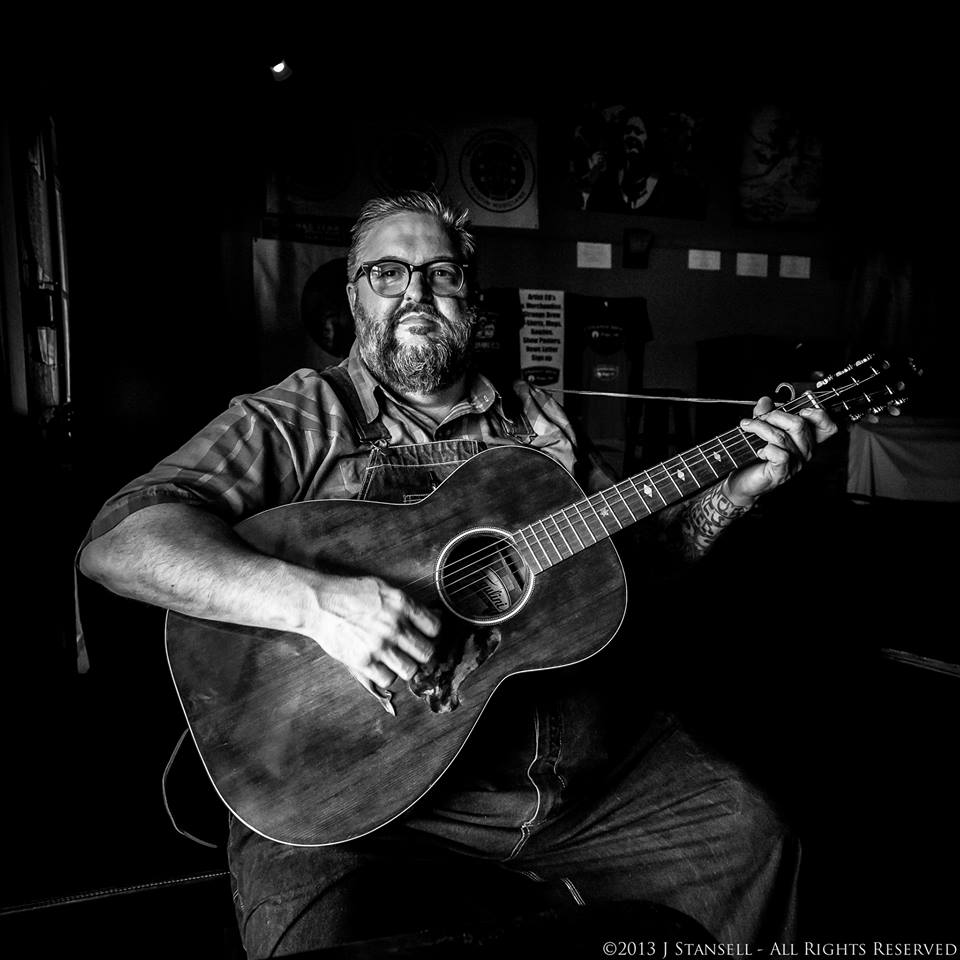
Mark Rubin

Mark Rubin is an American multi-instrumentalist, songwriter, producer of music for television and motion pictures, critic and educator. Founder of the proto-Americana acts Killbilly in Dallas, Texas, in 1989 and the Bad Livers, Austin Texas, in 1990, Rubin is best known as a bassist and tuba player. Today he lives and works in the musical community of South Louisiana based in New Orleans and tours frequently performing his own original material as "Jew of Oklahoma".

== Early life ==
Rubin was born in Stillwater, Oklahoma, and grew up in Norman, Oklahoma. His father was the director of the Hillel Foundation at the University of Oklahoma and was raised in a Jewishly observant household. He first arrived in Austin on August 28, 1987. As of 2014 he lives and works in New Orleans.

== Musical career ==
=== Killbilly ===
Rubin was a founding member of "Killbilly", a Dallas, Texas–based band active from 1987 to 1994, which described its music as being a mixture of bluegrass and punk. Critics have variously described the band's style as a "fusion of bluegrass and shred metal", and as "a genuine bluegrass band playing straight, fast and loud". It was in Killbilly that Rubin first met banjoist Danny Barnes who encouraged his playing and suggested he leave for Austin. Rubin left the band, and Dallas, to move to Austin and play with Barnes in 1989, eventually forming "Bad Livers" in 1990.

=== Bad Livers ===
The "Bad Livers" were an American band from Austin, Texas, United States, whose inventive musical style defied attempts to categorize them according to existing genres, though their influences included bluegrass, folk, punk, and other musical styles. The original lineup, formed in 1990, included Danny Barnes on banjo, guitar and resonator guitar, Mark Rubin on upright bass and tuba, and Ralph "Trey" White III on fiddle and accordion. Barnes composed the majority of the group's original songs. When White quit the group in a snit at the end of 1996, he was briefly replaced by Bob Grant on mandolin and guitar. Barnes and Rubin then continued to perform and record as a duo until unofficially dissolving the band in 2000. The band has neither toured nor recorded since then, but Barnes and Rubin played a few live shows with Grant in 2008, 2009, and 2014.

The Bad Livers' music has often been cited for its influence on other groups, creating what The Austin Chronicle described as "an impressive legacy". The Stranger credited them with "revitalizing roots music", and, according to the San Francisco Chronicle, "The Bad Livers helped open the way for old-time and bluegrass bands of today". The Bad Livers' first album, Delusions of Banjer, was released in 1992 on Quarterstick Records and produced by Paul Leary of the Butthole Surfers. The album was praised for "Barnes's strong material, as well as the group's tight musical interaction." The band's second album, Horses in the Mines, was produced by Barnes and released on Quarterstick in 1994. In his review, McLeese admired them as "a band drawing from the wellspring of tradition to create something fresh, vital and original." Süddeutsche Zeitung found that the record "sounded quite authentic—almost as if it had long held a place in the Library of Congress." The Bad Livers spent 1995 and 1996 touring and working on side projects as well as looking for a new label to release their next album. In 1999, Rubin was, according to Andy Langer, the band's "bassist, co-manager, and goodwill ambassador".

The Bad Livers spent 1995 and 1996 touring and working on side projects as well as looking for a new label to release their next album. Finally the band signed a three-album deal with Sugar Hill Records, which had more experience than Quarterstick at "selling banjo records". Their first album for the label, Hogs on the Highway, was released along with the information that White had decided to leave the band. It was announced that he was to be replaced by Bob Grant, though Grant's tenure with the band did not last long. Both White and Grant appeared on Hogs on the Highway, which received enthusiastic reviews from Sing Out!, praising Barnes' "quirky and inventive" original songs, and the Old-Time Herald, admiring the "considerable skill" with which Barnes crafted his lyrics. The Austin American-Statesman agreed that Barnes was "an entirely underrated songwriter" as well as a "banjo wizard", while The Washington Post lauded his "timeless, deadpan voice". The Sydney Morning Herald was appreciative of the "beautifully controlled ambience" of the entire album.

Shortly after the album's release, Barnes moved from Austin to Port Hadlock, Washington, though he and Rubin continued to work closely together on the score for the Richard Linklater film The Newton Boys as well as the Bad Livers' next album. Although the soundtrack was admired by The Village Voice and Entertainment Weekly as well as the Austin papers, the film did not fare well at the box office, and the soundtrack album did not sell well. The Bad Livers' second album for Sugar Hill, Industry and Thrift, was released in September 1998 with only Barnes and Rubin credited as members of the band, though the album features various guest musicians, including members of Rubin's side project, Rubinchik's Orkestyr, who are featured on the track "A Yid Ist Geboren inz Oklahoma". The album garnered positive reviews, and the Chicago Tribune selected it as the best bluegrass album of 1998, while The Times of London admired its "genuine originality". Industry and Thrift did not receive as much attention from the press as Hogs on the Highway had, however, and as Barnes lamented, the album "fell off the face of the earth".

The Bad Livers' final album, Blood and Mood, was released in February 2000 and featured, as The Austin Chronicle noted with astonishment: "Electric punk rock, sample-based tunes with drum tracks, and a shocking scarcity of juiced-up banjo playing". The Independent named it "the leftfield album of the week" and found that it "brims with enthusiastic ideas", while The Washington Post was puzzled but invigorated by a live show supporting the album, concluding that it had been "Fascinating. Even refreshing". Although it left No Depression depressed, Daniel Wolff found the album to be uniquely evocative of a "rural eccentricity" that had not yet been extinguished and formed a kind of continuum with punk and old-time country: "Either the Bad Livers pick up where 'I Wish I Were a Mole in the Ground' left off, or Bascom Lunsford discovered the punk aesthetic in the 1920s."

The Bad Livers were inducted into the Austin Music Hall of Fame in 2007.

=== Klezmer and the Yiddish Culture Renaissance ===
Since 1996, Rubin has been a driving force in the "klezmer" music world as a bassist, tuba player, instructor and pedagogue. His credits in the Jewish music world include long time collaborations with Frank London’s Klezmer Brass All-Stars, The Other Europeans, and Andy Statman, as well as two decades on faculty at KlezKamp. He has been featured performer and instructor with multiple appearances at Toronto's Ashkenaz Festival, Yiddish Summer Weimar, KlezFest London, KlezMore Wein, Klezmer Festival Furth, Festival of Jewish Culture Krakow among others. His Jew of Oklahoma show debuted as a special feature at Ashkenaz in 2016. For three summers in the mid 2000s he toured with the Serbian Romani Brass Band Boban Markovic Orchestra in the "Brotherhood of Brass" project.

=== American Folklife ===
In 1990, upon learning of the death of San Antonio-based legendary accordionist Santiago Jiménez Jr.'s bassist Juan Viesca, Rubin became his full time string bassist, mastering the old-fashioned Hispanic "tololoche'" slap style. In 1991 he arranged a three record A&R deal for Jimenez Jr. on the Austin, Texas–based Watermelon Records label. The first "Corason de Piedra" garnered a Grammy Nomination.

In 1992, Rubin began working with Eastern European immigrant musicians from in and around the Houston area from the Polish and Czech speaking communities. Rubin produced or appears on releases for Texas-Polish dance band fiddler Brian Marshall and his Texas Slavic Playboys and Texas-Czech Accordionist Mark Halata and Texavia, appearing with both groups on the National Council of Traditional Arts touring roster for over two decades.

Rubin as a bassist is featured at the annual Festival of Texas Fiddling, as its founder noted the festival was "based on his fieldwork."

=== Soundtracks for Motion Picture and Television ===
Rubin was tapped by Director Richard Linklater to provide period music to his film the "Newton Boys" in 1996 for 20th Century Fox. He was called upon again as Music Consultant by director Douglas McGrath for the film "Infamous" for Warner Independent. And he created the sound-alike Hank Williams tracks for the George Wallace documentary "Setting the Woods on Fire" for PBS. So convincing were his versions that the rights holder initially accused the production company of digitally manipulating the original recordings.

=== "Slap Bass" Technique ===
Along with former roommate Kevin Smith (current bassist with Willie Nelson,) Rubin released the seminal video on the "slap" bass technique for upright bass, essentially kick starting the revival of a once lost art of bass playing. Closely associated with roots music, Rockabilly and Americana, literally a generation of musicians cite their video "The Ungentle Art" as their introduction and lexicon to the style. Rubin has travelled internationally as a teacher and clinician since the mid-1990s to present day.

=== Post-Bad Livers career ===
In 2013, Rubin, along with Sean Orr, released the album "Texas Fiddle, Okie Guitar".

Rubin was featured along with three other principals in German documentary film "Der Zerbrochene Klang" ("The Broken Sound") about his participation in the Other Europeans Project; a collective of Jewish and Roma musicians from 9 different countries. As of April 2014, Rubin lives and works in New Orleans, Louisiana as a freelance musician, music writer and cultural critic. He is currently penning his memoir.

=== Jew of Oklahoma ===
In 2015, Rubin released a solo album, "Southern Discomfort", which contains nine original songs and three covers.

In 2017 he released his first truly "solo" effort, "Songs for the Hangman's Daughter," recording 11 original compositions accompanied by either guitar, banjo or mandolin. Rubin explores themes centered around the duality of being a Jewish identified Southern Musician and tours solo across the US and Canada.

in 2021 during the height of the Covid epidemic, Rubin released "Triumph of Assimilation" to great reviews:

No Depression said "There’s no better distillation of Jewish American identity couched in Southern culture than a 30-minute yarn seesawing between humor, horror, and rage relating to the ways the region’s legendary hospitality clangs with Jewish custom. For most Jews, “hostility” is the likelier word. For Mark Rubin, the Jew of Oklahoma himself, the luxury of just being plain old exasperated is welcome by comparison. ...In the South, Jews are acknowledged merely as Jews. Rubin’s radical argument is that maybe they should be treated as people."

Folk Alley said "Mark Rubin is a legend from back in the alt country days, known for his pioneering work in the 90s with his band The Bad Livers in Austin. While he’s never left behind his earlier punk bonafides, his new work in recent years, billed as Mark Rubin - Jew of Oklahoma, has been more focused on the complexity of his identity as a Jewish person of Southern descent. With his new album, The Triumph of Assimilation, he masterfully melds old-school roots music with Yiddish protest songs and brutally acerbic ruminations on the long history of American antisemitism."

The Weitzman National Museum of American Jewish History called him. "One of the great American Jewish musicians of our time."

=== Panorama Jazz Band ===
When not touring, Rubin is tenor banjoist and vocalist for the Panorama Jazz band of New Orleans.

== Discography ==
- Bad Livers, Lust for Life 45 rpm (1991)
- Bad Livers, Delusions of Banjer (Quarterstick/Touch and Go 1991)
- Bad Livers, Lust for Life 12-inch EP UK only (Quarterstick/Touch and Go 1992)
- Bad Livers, Horses in the Mines (Quarterstick/Touch and Go 1993)
- Bad Livers, Dust in the Bible (Quarterstick/Touch and Go 1994)
- Bad Livers, Hogs on the Highway (Sugar Hill Records, 1997)
- Bad Livers, Industry and Thrift (Sugar Hill Records, 1998)
- Bad Livers, Blood and Mood (Sugar Hill Records, 2000)
- Santiago Jimenez Jr., Musica de Tiempos Pasados, Presente y Futuro, (Watermelon Records 1996)
- Soundtrack to the "Newton Boys," (20th Century Fox, 1997)
- Bad Livers, The Ridgetop Sessions, (LumpyDisc 1997)
- Barnes, Hokkanen and Rubin, aka the Mad Cat Trio (LumpyDisc 1998)
- Rubinchik's Orkestyr, Filpnotics Freilach (Rubinchik Recordings, 1999)
- Mark Rubin and Friends, Hill Country Hannukah (Rubinchik Recordings, 2000)
- Bing Bang Boys, (Rubinchik Recordings, 2002)
- Brian Marshall and Texas Kapela, 2002
- Fat Man & Little Boy, The Atomic Duo, (Independent, 2011)
- Mark Rubin and Sean Orr, Texas Fiddle, Okie Guitar (Rubinchik Recordings, 2013)
- Mark Rubin, Jew of Oklahoma, Southern Discomfort (Independent, 2015)
- Mark Rubin, Jew of Oklahoma, Songs for The Hangman’s Daughter (Independent, 2017)
- Rubinchik's Yiddish Ensemble, Semitism, (Rubinchik, 2020)
- Mark Rubin & Chip Wilson. T&T, (Rubinchik, 2020)
- Mark Rubin, Jew of Oklahoma, The Triumph of Assimilation (Independent, 2021)
- Panorama Jazz Band featuring Mark Rubin, Jew of Oklahoma. Spin the Dreidel, (Independent 2021)
- Panorama Jazz Band featuring Mark Rubin, Jew of Oklahoma, Happy Joyous Hannukah (Independent 2021)
- Bad Livers, Naked & Alone. (LumpyDisc, 2024)
- Jose Moreno y su Conjunto, Fort Warden, (Rubinchik, 2024)
