= Salim Nourallah =

American singer-songwriter

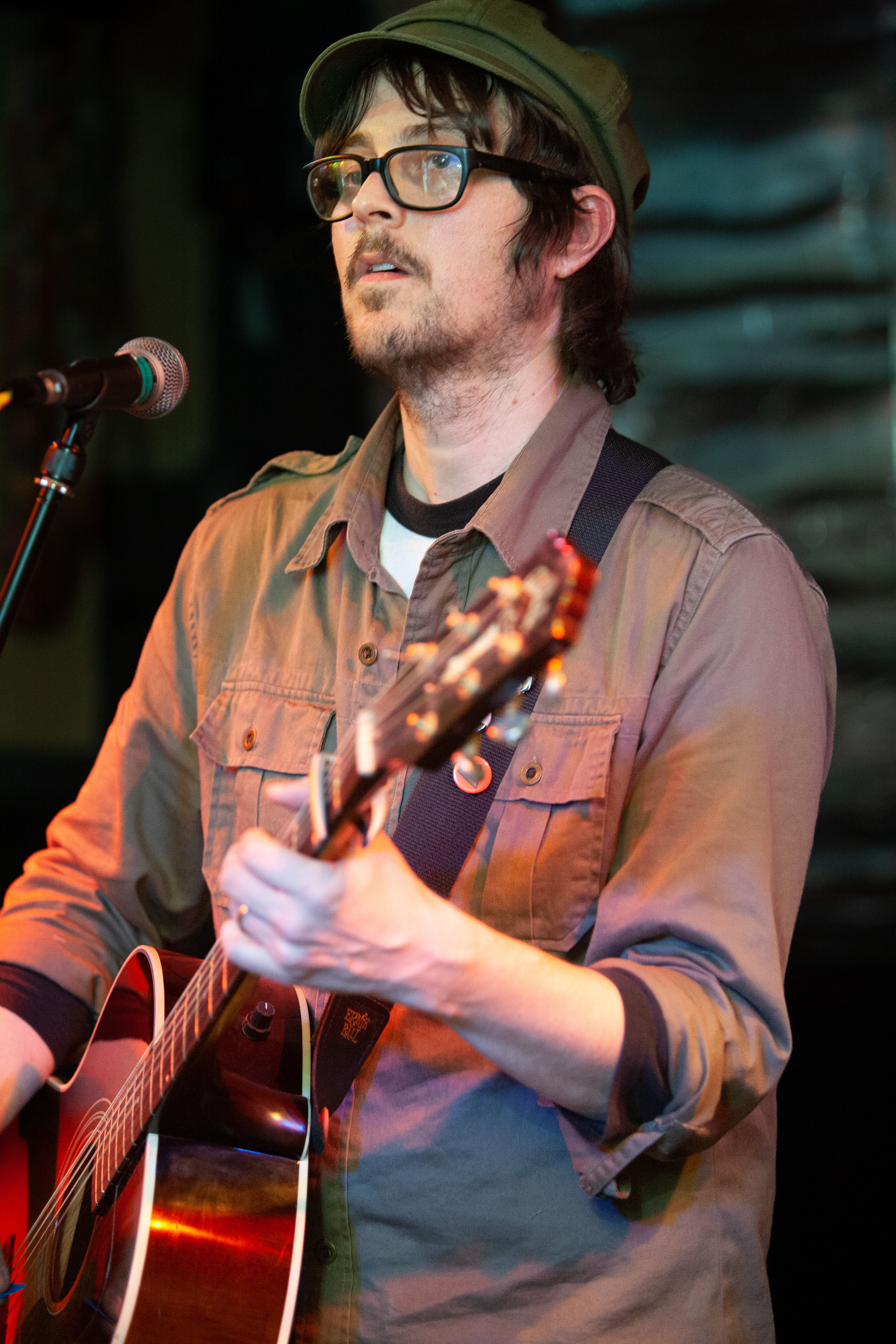
- Salim Nourallah (2007)

Background information
- Born: May 3, 1967 (age 57); Alton, Illinois, United States
- Origin: Denton, Texas, United States
- Genres: Alt-country
- Occupation(s): Producer, musician, songwriter
- Instrument(s): Vocals, guitar
- Years active: 1990–present
- Labels: Summer Break; Paisley Pop; Western Vinyl; Tapete Records
- Website: SalimNourallah.com

Salim Nourallah is a Texas-based singer, songwriter, and producer.

== Music career ==
Born in Alton, Illinois, the eldest child of Fayez and Karen Nourallah, Nourallah was raised in El Paso, Texas, where his family moved when he was three. With his brother Faris, Salim relocated to Denton, Texas, in 1988. They formed a band together called the Moon Festival from 1990 to 1997. The Nourallah Brothers self-titled debut was released by Western Vinyl in 2000. The album was actually recorded in 1998, and during the wait the brothers separated. Faris continued with a solo career while Salim formed the pop-punk band the Happiness Factor. The Happiness Factor released two albums: Self-Improvement? (Summer Break Records) in 2001 and Avoid Danger (Paisley Pop) in 2004.

In 2004 Salim Nourallah started his solo career as a recording artist with Polaroid (Western Vinyl) and the EP A Way to Your Heart (Paisley Pop). He went on to release the critically acclaimed Beautiful Noise (Western Vinyl/Tapete Records) in 2005, followed by Snowing in My Heart (Tapete Records) in 2007 and Constellation in 2009. After the German indie label Tapete Records released Beautiful Noise in the spring of 2006 a headlining European tour followed. It was capped with an appearance at Hamburg's Reeperbahn Festival. Salim's third album Snowing in My Heart, yielded the single "Don't Be Afraid," which appeared on HBO's show The Wire and "So Down," which appeared on Smallville. Another European tour followed in the Fall of 2007 with performances not only throughout Germany but also in Paris, Vienna, and Switzerland. In May 2009 a third European tour took place to coincide the release of Constellation.

In April 2012 Nourallah released his 5th solo record, Hit Parade, as well as a bonus E.P. culled from the HP recording sessions. Hamburg's Tapete Records once again released both cds in Europe and the United States. Hit Parade garnered more favorable press like "Nourallah has assembled the best album of his career..."

Nourallah also formed a new band called the Travoltas, his first since he dis-banded the Happiness Factor in 2003. The Travoltas released a debut CD that was recorded in just 3 days and then undertook a two-week tour of the Midwest and East Coast with the Old 97s in October.

Skeleton Closet, the 6th full-length record, finally emerged in August 2015. After two successful fan funding drives Nourallah released it on his own HIT records label. The record was over 4 years in the making as initial tracks were started during the recording sessions that yielded Hit Parade. Tours with Wreckless Eric, Adam Levy (the Honeydogs), Rhett Miller, Alex Dezen (the Damnwells) & Billy Harvey made 2015 Nourallah's most active year as a performer. He also released a 6-song E.P. called Terlingua as a companion to Skeleton Closet and then toured the Western half of the US opening for the Old 97s with just a 1979 Panasonic boom box as his backing band.

2017 saw the release of A Break in the Battle, a collection of 15 cover songs recorded with the help of long-time friends and collaborators, Chris Holt and Paul Averitt. Some of Nourallah’s favorite songs were the focus - Prefab Sprout, the Replacements, Comsat Angels and Diesel Park West provided some of the source material.

September 2018 saw the release of the double album, Somewhere South of Sane. Nourallah undertook a short tour of Texas with Marty Willson-Piper from the Church and Laish. Laish is the moniker for British singer-songwriter, Danny Green. It was also a big year for Palo Santo Records, the record label Nourallah co-founded. The label released debut records by Xuan, Broken Baby and Sleepy Zuhoski as well as re-issuing The Loyal Serpent from Diesel Park West frontman John Butler.

Nourallah released a 5 CD boxset called "The World's Weakest Man" on his Bandcamp site in early 2022. The set was a culmination of all the music he and producer Billy Harvey had worked on since 2018. The "See You in Marfa" EP was also released on Bandcamp in June. The 5 song EP consisted of material Nourallah had recorded in 2018 with Marty Willson-Piper co-producing and playing guitar.

== Producer ==
In 2006 the Dallas Observer gave Salim Nourallah's 2nd LP, Beautiful Noise, awards for Best Song and Best Producer. Nourallah has also won the DOMA Best Producer award seven times in a row (2006–2012). In 2007 Salim produced the Old 97's successful album Blame it on Gravity; he also produced their The Grand Theatre, Volume One & Volume Two double album which garnered the band some of the best reviews of their career as well as their most successful single to date, "Every Night is Friday Night (Without You)." Other Nourallah productions of note: Rhett Miller's self-titled disc Rhett Miller (Shout Factory!); Buttercup's The Weather Here; Carter Albrecht Jesus Is Alive & Living in London; Deathray Davies the Kick & the Snare. In 2012, Salim produced Smile Smile's Marry a Stranger (Kirtland Records), Sammy Strittmatter's Here but Gone and Nicholas Altobelli's Without a Home.

Nourallah produced the Old 97s 9th album, Most Messed Up, which was released in April 2014 by ATO. This was the 4th consecutive Nourallah-produced 97s record. It was met with rave reviews & also gave the 97s their highest Billboard charting to date. Tommy Stinson, from the Replacements, made a notable appearance on guitar. The album reached #30 on Billboard. In April 2015 the Nourallah produced self-titled Damnwells record was released. It hit #6 on the Billboard Heat-Seekers chart. 2015 also saw the release of yet another critically well-received Nicholas Altobelli record, Searching for that Minor Key.

Diesel Park West's 9th album, "Not Quite the American Dream," also garnered Nourallah a production credit along with John Dufilho, who mixed it. The album also was released on Nourallah's newly formed Happiness (A Record Label).
