= Old 97's =

American country rock band

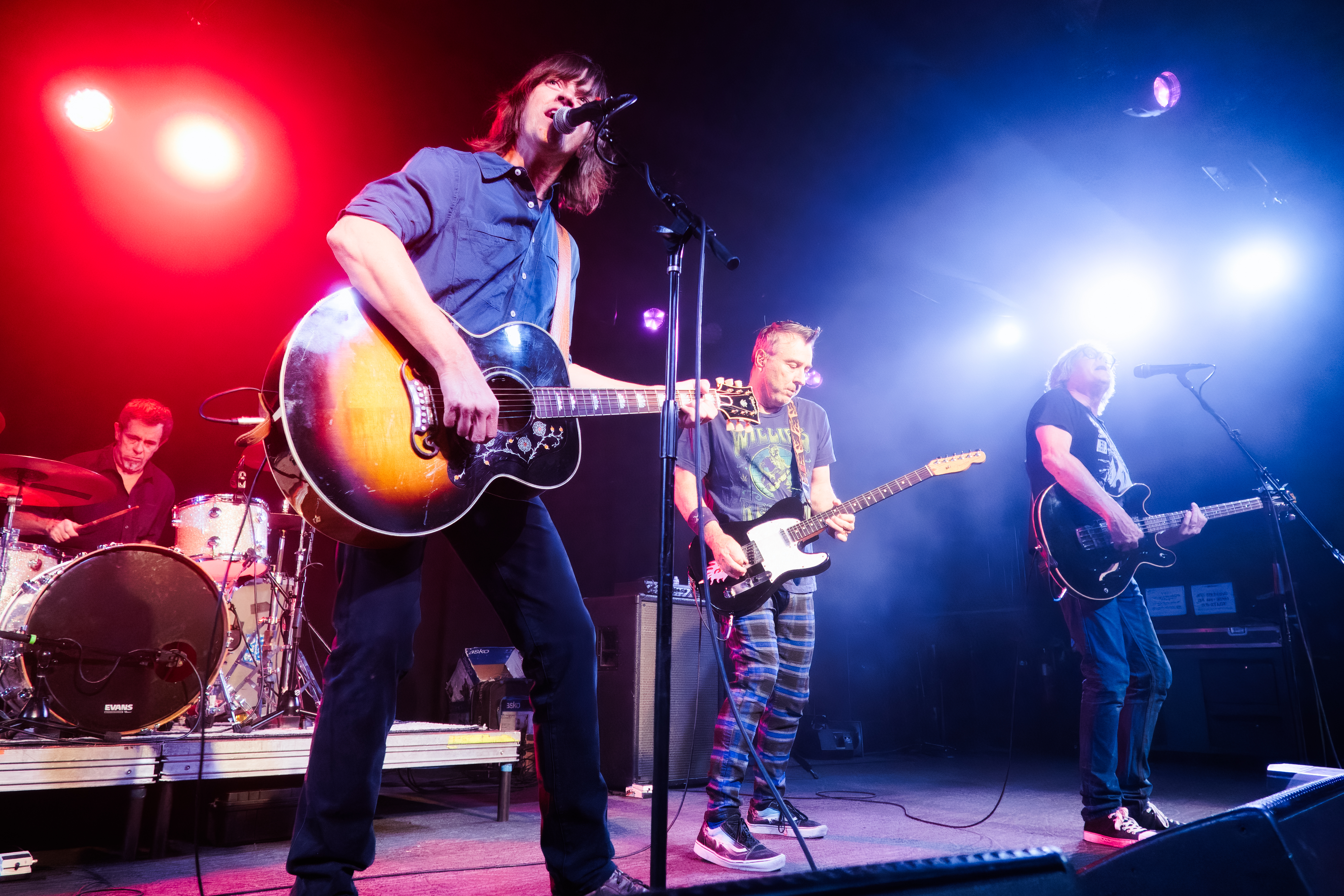
- Old 97's in 2026

Background information
- Origin: Dallas, Texas, U.S.
- Genres: Country rock; alternative country; indie rock; power pop; Americana
- Years active: 1993–present
- Labels: ATO Records, Big Iron Records, Idol Records, Bloodshot Records, Elektra Records, New West Records
- Members: Rhett Miller; Murry Hammond; Ken Bethea; Philip Peeples
- Website: Old97s.com

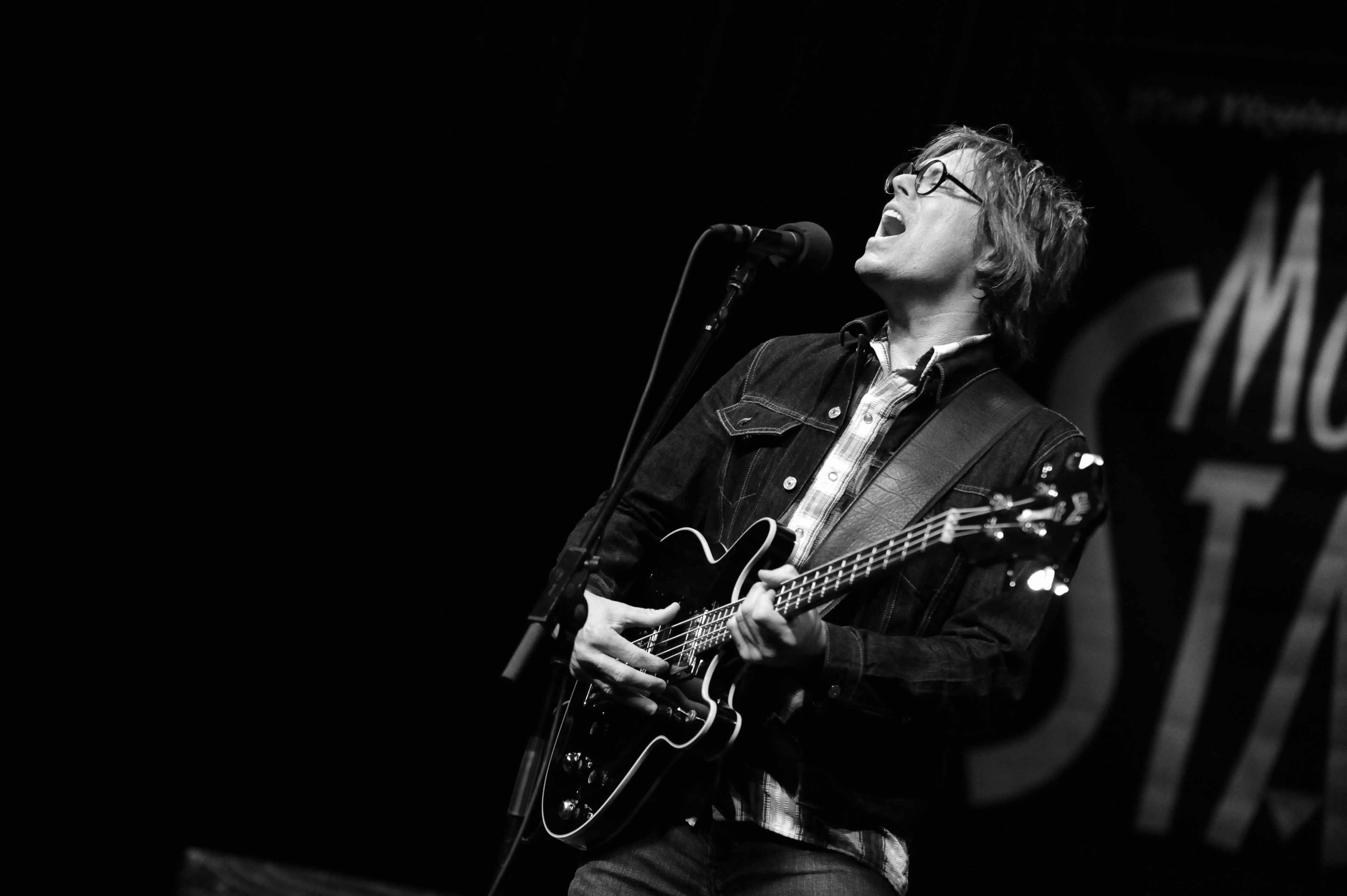
Murry Hammond performing on Mountain Stage on NPR, December 2010

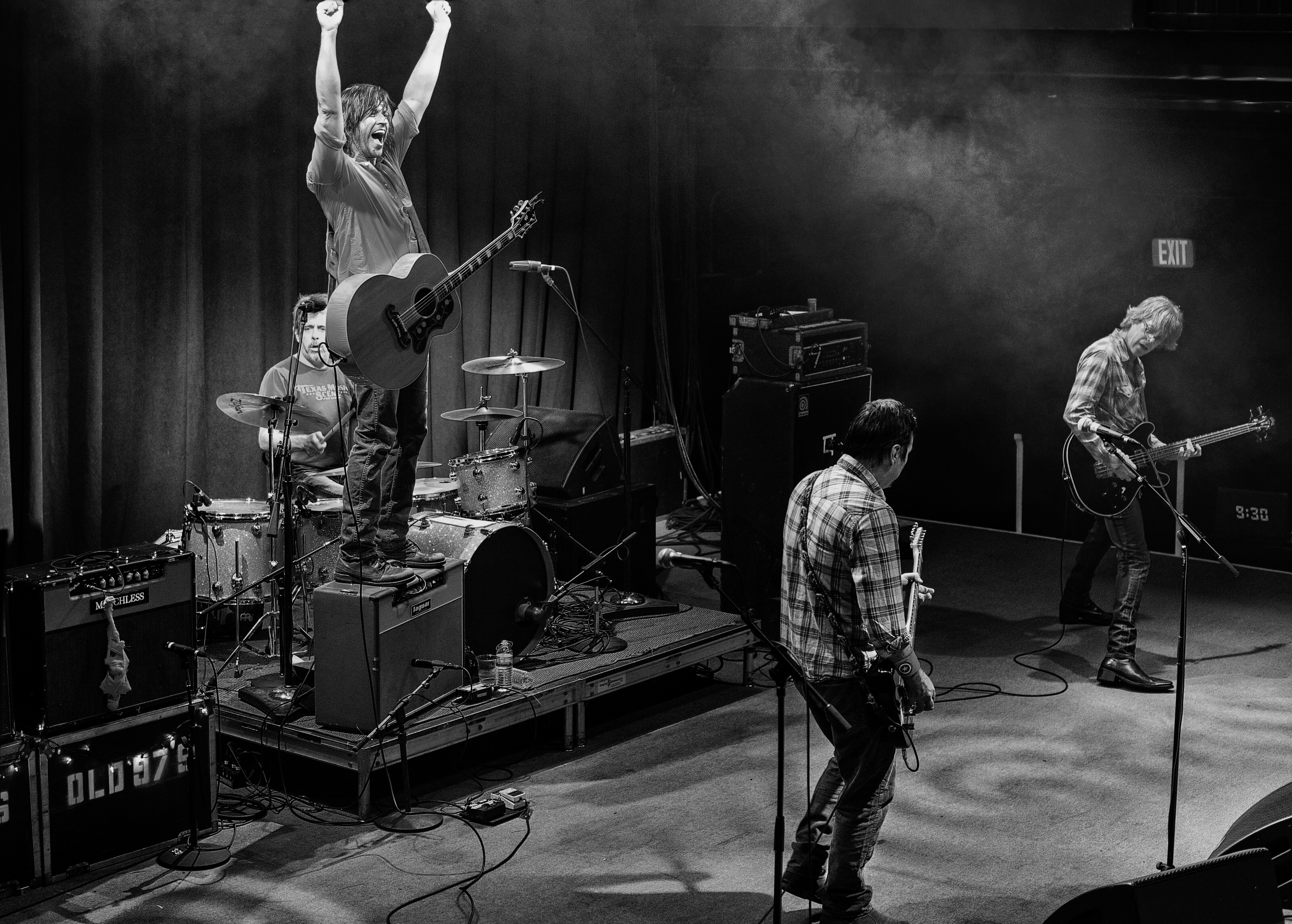
Old 97's at the 9:30 Club in Washington, D.C., October 2015

Old 97's is an American rock band from Dallas. Formed in 1993, they have released thirteen studio albums, two full extended plays, shared split duty on another EP, and they have a live album. Their most recent release is titled American Primitive.

Old 97's were pioneers of the alt-country movement during the mid-to-late 1990s, then they developed more of a power pop style in the 2000s. Lead vocalist and primary songwriter Rhett Miller has said the band's style is "loud folk". The band's name is in reference to the Wreck of the Old 97, a 1903 train crash which inspired several folk songs.

== Career ==
Initially a popular Dallas bar band, Old 97's toured the country after releasing their first album, 1994's Hitchhike to Rhome and 1995's split EP release Stoned / Garage Sale with fellow Dallas band Funland on Idol Records. In Chicago, they caught the attention of Bloodshot Records and were signed to record their next album. 1995's Wreck Your Life brought them to the attention of Elektra Records, who hoped that alt-country could be a new post-grunge trend. The band's lead singer Rhett Miller, was born in Austin and has lived in New York City and Los Angeles. Many of the band's songs include local Texas references, with references to New York City, Los Angeles, and Chicago appearing in the lyrics as well.

Most songs are written and sung by Miller, with bassist Murry Hammond performing the vocals on one or two tracks per album. Hammond also handled the singing on a number of country covers, especially in the band's earlier years. Hammond also performs gospel at his local church. The band's 2004 album Drag It Up includes a song written and sung by guitarist Ken Bethea, "Coahuila." In 2005, Blender magazine ranked the band's then most successful single, 1999's "Murder (Or a Heart Attack)", as the 176th greatest song "since you were born."

Their music has been featured in a number of films and TV series including The Break-Up ("Salome", "Melt Show", "Timebomb"), Clay Pigeons ("Timebomb"), Slither ("The New Kid"), Ned's Declassified School Survival Guide ("Big Brown Eyes"), Ed ("Question", "King of All the World"), Scrubs ("Question"), Veronica Mars ("Adelaide", "Four-Leaf Clover", "The New Kid") and Scorpion ("Question"). With respect to The Break-Up, a key scene toward the end of the film takes place at an Old 97's concert. In the season 2 episode "Tango and Smash", of the series FUBAR, the Old 97's appear as a random unnamed house band at a fancy restaurant in Tallinn who are asked if they might know the oldie "Dance With Me" – though they are only able to closely replicate the Old 97's (effectively playing a remix of their own song) for a lengthy dance scene between two of the series leads.

Rhett Miller has recorded seven solo studio albums and a live album, with 2002's The Instigator receiving substantial airplay on alternative-oriented radio stations. He toured with Neil Finn in 2004. Miller's second major commercial album, The Believer, was released in February 2006. Murry Hammond's solo album, I Don't Know Where I'm Going But I'm on My Way, was released April 21, 2008. Old 97's have been heralded as a great live band, although they claim never to rehearse their act. They included five live songs as a bonus disc on Satellite Rides, and released a live double CD set recorded at historic Gruene Hall in 2005, Alive & Wired.

Rhino Entertainment released Hit by a Train: The Best of Old 97's, an 18-track compilation of songs from the band's beginnings through 2001, featuring liner notes and an essay by rock critic Robert Christgau. Satellite Riders is a faux "tribute band"—it is actually an alias the band performs under when contractual obligations prevent them from using the Old 97's name. The Ranchero Brothers is the name used when only Rhett and Murry Hammond perform. The recording of "Timebomb" from the live album Alive & Wired was made available for download along with other alt-country songs for the music video games Rock Band and Rock Band 2.

Their next studio project, The Grand Theatre, was released in two volumes. The first, The Grand Theatre, Volume One, was released on October 12, 2010. The second, The Grand Theatre, Volume Two, was released on July 5, 2011. In 2013, the band released an EP containing two tracks with vocals by Waylon Jennings entitled Old 97's & Waylon Jennings. Rhett Miller called the previously unreleased tunes with Jennings "the band's 'holy grail.'" The band's tenth studio album, Most Messed Up, was released April 29, 2014, by ATO Records and was their best-selling album to date, reaching No. 30 on the Billboard 200.

Their next two releases on ATO Records were Graveyard Whistling, their 11th studio album, released February 24, 2017, and Love the Holidays, an album of mostly original Christmas songs, released November 16, 2018. ATO Records released the band's next studio album, aptly named Twelfth, on August 21, 2020. The twelve tracks were produced by Vance Powell who produced Graveyard Whistling. Old 97's noted that the recording sessions in Nashville started on the night of a deadly tornado outbreak and right before the COVID-19 pandemic hit.

The band members portrayed the alien rock band Bzermikitokolok and the Knowheremen in The Guardians of the Galaxy Holiday Special, singing the original song "I Don't Know What Christmas Is (But Christmastime Is Here)" and their 2018 song "Here It Is Christmastime," the latter with Kevin Bacon singing lead. They were honored with a Lifetime Achievement Award at the 2025 Americana Music Honors & Awards on September 10, 2025.

== Band members ==
Current members

- Rhett Miller – lead vocals, rhythm guitar (1993–present)
- Murry Hammond – bass guitar, backing and lead vocals, acoustic guitar (1993–present)
- Ken Bethea – lead guitar, backing and lead vocals (1993–present)
- Philip Peeples – drums, backing vocals (1993–present)

Studio substitutes

- Clark Vogeler – lead guitar (1994)
- Alan Wooley – lead guitar (1994)

Touring substitutes

- Fred Armisen – drums (2017)
- Jason Garner – drums (2017)

== Discography ==
=== Albums ===
Year	Album	Billboard 200	Label
1994	Hitchhike to Rhome		Idol Records
1995	Stoned / Garage Sale (with Funland)		Idol Records
1995	Wreck Your Life		Bloodshot Records
1997	Too Far to Care		Elektra Records
1999	Fight Songs		Elektra Records
2000	Early Tracks		Bloodshot Records
2001	Satellite Rides	121	Elektra Records
2004	Drag It Up	120	New West Records
2005	Alive & Wired		New West Records
2006	Hit by a Train: The Best of Old 97's		Rhino Entertainment
2008	Blame It on Gravity		New West Records
2009	Wreck Your Life... And Then Some: The Complete Bloodshot Recordings [Vinyl Only]	85	Bloodshot Records
2010	Mimeograph EP		New West Records
2010	The Grand Theatre, Volume One		New West Records
2011	The Grand Theatre, Volume Two		New West Records
2012	Too Far to Care: Expanded Edition		Omnivore Recordings
2013	Old 97's & Waylon Jennings		Omnivore Recordings
2014	Most Messed Up	30	ATO Records
2017	Graveyard Whistling	82	ATO Records
2018	Love the Holidays		ATO Records
2020	Twelfth		ATO Records
2024	American Primitive		ATO Records

=== Singles ===
Year	Song	Chart positions	Album
Year	Song	US AAA	Album
1995	"Eyes for You"	—	Non-album single
1996	"Crying Drunk"	—	Non-album single
1997	"Timebomb"	—	Too Far to Care
1998	"Streets of Where I'm From"	—	Too Far to Care
1999	"Murder (or a Heart Attack)"	6	Fight Songs
1999	"Nineteen"	9	Fight Songs
2001	"King of All the World"	8	Satellite Rides
2007	"Here It Is Christmas Time"	—	non-album single
2008	"Dance With Me"	28	Blame It On Gravity
2010	"Every Night is Friday Night (With You)"	20	The Grand Theatre, Volume One
2017	"Good with God" (featuring Brandi Carlile)	11	Graveyard Whistling
2020	"Turn off the TV"	22	Twelfth
2022	"I Don't Know What Christmas Is (But Christmastime Is Here)"	—	Non-album single

== DVDs ==
- 2005: Old 97's Live (New West Records)
