= Rhett Miller =

American singer (born 1970)

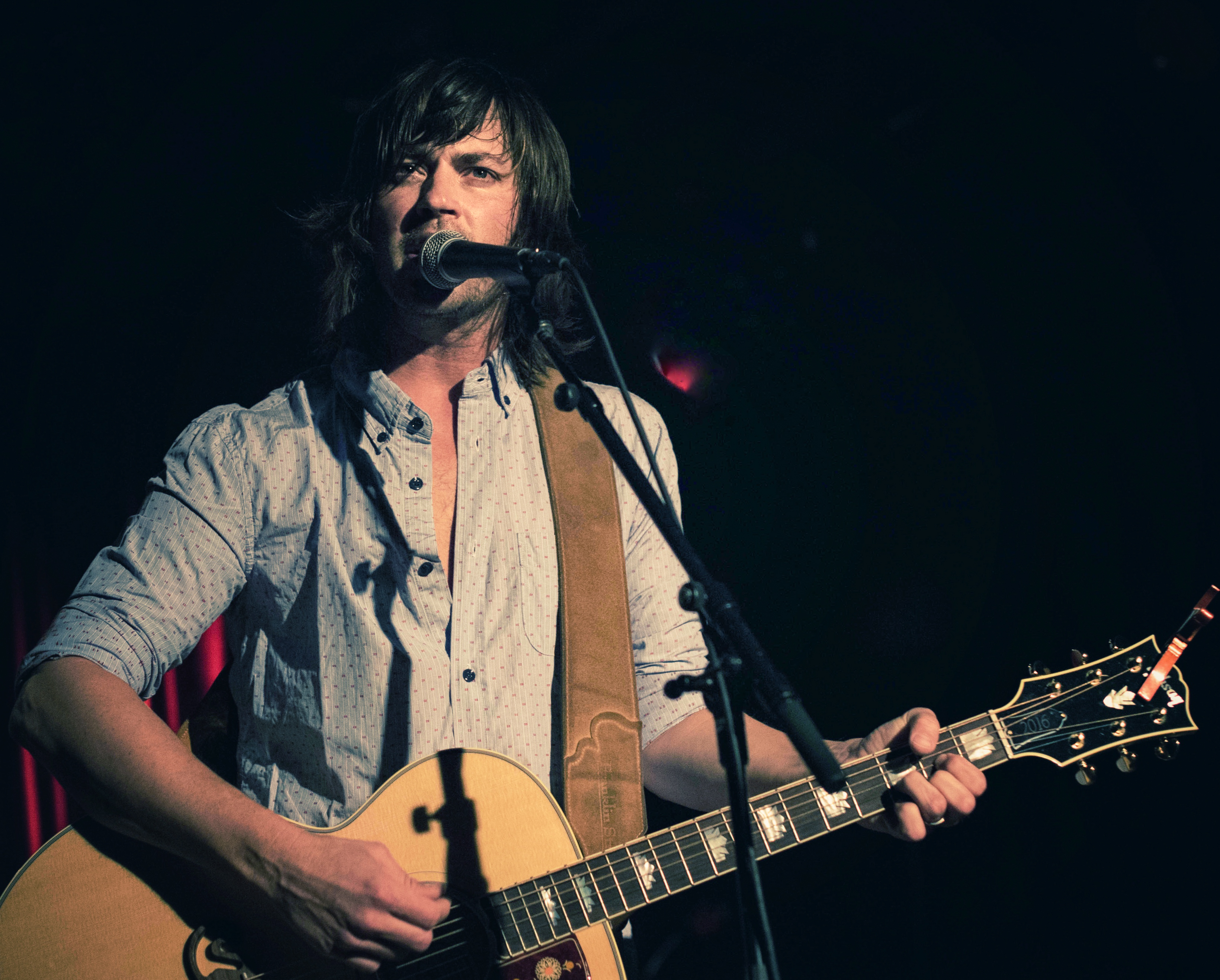
- Rhett Miller at Bell House

Background information
- Born: Stewart Ransom Miller II; September 6, 1970 (age 56); Austin, Texas U.S.
- Origin: Dallas, Texas U.S.
- Genres: Country rock; alternative country; power pop; alternative rock
- Occupations: Musician; Singer-songwriter
- Instruments: Vocals; Rhythm guitar
- Years active: 1986–present
- Labels: Carpe Diem; Elektra; Verve Forecast; Shout! Factory; Maximum Sunshine; ATO Records
- Website: www.rhettmiller.com

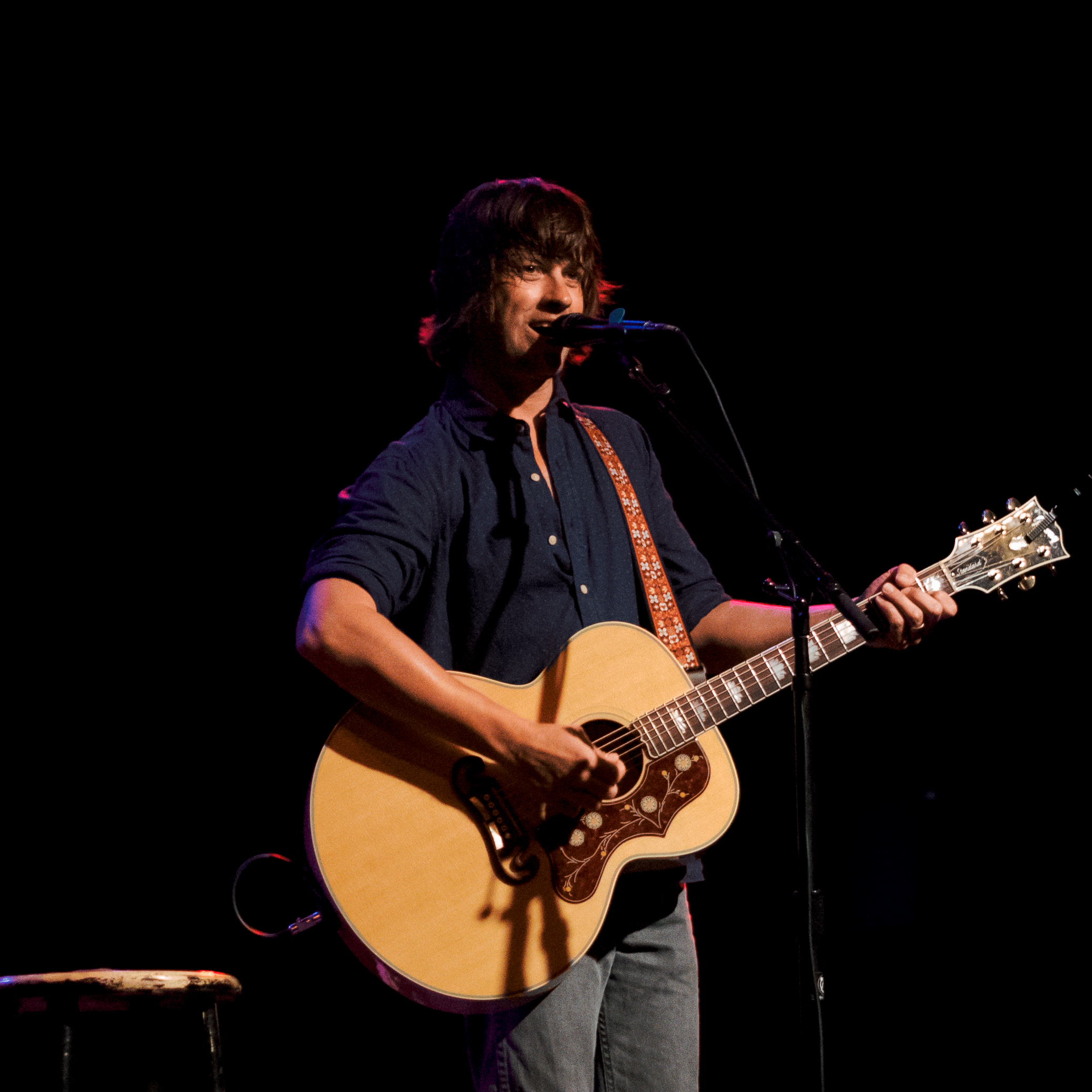
Rhett Miller at the Triple Door in Seattle. December 10, 2013

Stewart Ransom "Rhett" Miller II (born September 6, 1970) is the lead singer of the alternative country rock band Old 97's. He also records and performs as a solo musician, and has been published as a writer of both fiction and non-fiction.

== Early life ==
Miller, a seventh-generation Texan, was born in Austin, Texas. Miller's parents divorced when he was 17 years old. Miller, the oldest of three children, has a younger brother and sister. Rhett's paternal grandfather, Giles E. Miller, was a young millionaire scion of a successful textile family who, in 1952 owned the first NFL football team in the south, the Dallas Texans. The Texans folded after seven games, marking the last time an NFL franchise would go bankrupt.

Miller's family lived in Highland Park, Texas, where he went to Armstrong Elementary School. In 4th grade, Miller was hospitalized for several months due to a severe inner-ear problem. In 6th grade, he began attending St. Mark's School of Texas, a private boys' school in North Dallas. He started taking guitar lessons when he was 12 years old and writing songs when he was 13. Miller has said that his time at St. Mark's was very difficult, and that he was ostracized and bullied, leading to depression which culminated in a suicide attempt at the age of 14. The following year in April 1985 Miller played his first gig at 500 Cafe in downtown Dallas. Through high school Miller played in bands, becoming a local folk performer and headlining small venues and opening for such nationally touring artists as Rosanne Cash, Chris Isaak, and The Lords of the New Church. Also in high school, Miller edited St. Mark's literary magazine and helped start an alternative literary magazine called The Rag, for which he wrote poetry.

In 1989, Miller graduated from St. Mark's School of Texas. He briefly attended Sarah Lawrence College on a creative writing scholarship before deciding to move back to Texas to pursue a music career.

== Career ==
In 1989, while still in high school, Miller released an album called Mythologies. The album title was taken from a book of essays by the French media philosopher Roland Barthes. Only 1,000 copies of the CD exist. Miller signed and numbered each one.

In 1990, when Miller returned to Dallas after his semester at college, Miller formed a band called Sleepy Heroes with childhood friend and future Old 97’s bassist Murry Hammond. Sleepy Heroes was a power-pop three piece. They released one album, Under a Radio Sun, before they broke up. The Old 97's song, "Victoria", was written during the last few months of Sleepy Heroes.

Miller was the lead singer of various bands in Dallas between 1990 and 1993: Rhett Miller's Third Eye, Buzz, Rhett's Exploding, and Retablo, for which Miller self-recorded an unreleased record on cassette which included some early Old 97's songs.

In 1993, Miller and Hammond formed Old 97's as a three piece acoustic act along with their neighbor at Dallas' Marquita Court Apartments, guitarist Ken Bethea. They played as a three piece for six months before adding Darin Lin Wood on drums. He played with the band for a few weeks in the summer of 1993 before being replaced by Philip Peeples who has remained the band's drummer ever since.

Old 97’s first album, Hitchhike To Rhome, came out on local Dallas label Big Iron Records in 1993. During the first year of Old 97’s, Miller also performed as a touring member of the band Killbilly. It was during a Killbilly tour that Miller met Nan Warshaw, owner of Chicago's Bloodshot Records, the label which released Old 97’s second album, Wreck Your Life.

After a sold-out SXSW showcase in 1995, Old 97’s found themselves the subject of a major label bidding war. 15 record labels fought to sign the band, with Elektra Records A&R rep Tom DeSavia finally inking the band to a multi-album deal. Their first Elektra release, Too Far To Care, came out in 1997, followed by Fight Songs and Satellite Rides.

In 2002, Miller released The Instigator on Elektra Records. The record was produced and recorded with Jon Brion, received critical acclaim and substantial airplay on alternative-oriented radio stations.

In 2006, Miller released The Believer on the Verve Forecast label. It includes a cover of Brion's "I Believe She's Lying" and "Fireflies", a duet with Rachael Yamagata.

In 2009, Miller released his fourth record, the self-titled Rhett Miller, on Shout! Factory. The record includes Jon Brion on guitar and bass, The Apples in Stereo's John Dufilho on drums and Billy Harvey on guitar. In 2011, Miller self-released a live recording of The Interpreter: Live at Largo.

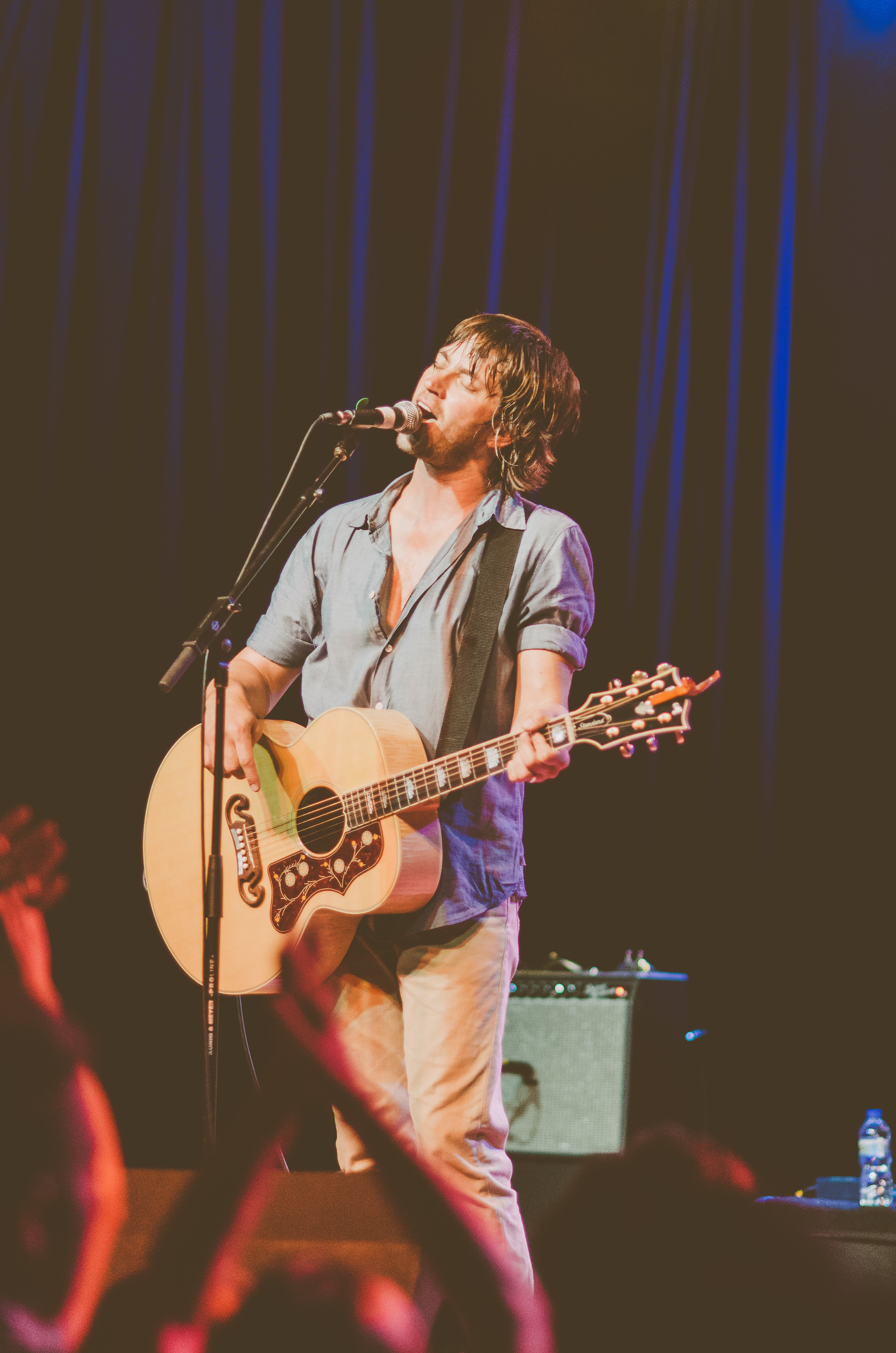
Miller performing in 2013

In 2012, Miller released The Dreamer. The record, a Maximum Sunshine release which Miller self-produced, included collaborations with Rosanne Cash and Ben Kweller.

In 2015, Miller released his sixth solo record, called The Traveler, on ATO Records. The album was a notable shift for Miller, as he recorded it with a Portland, Oregon-based bluegrass band called Black Prairie, which includes members of The Decemberists. The album also features contributions from Peter Buck and Scott McCaughey of R.E.M.

In 2018, Miller released The Messenger on ATO Records.

In 2022, Miller released The Misfit on ATO Records.

In 2025, Miller released A Lifetime of Riding by Night on ATO Records.

=== Writing ===
Miller has written short stories, essays and articles that have appeared in Rolling Stone, The Baffler, Bookforum, Sports Illustrated, McSweeney's, The Atlantic, and Salon.

=== Other projects ===
In addition to his solo work, Miller has worked on various collaborations, including co-writing with other musicians.

- 2004: Recorded a version of Simon and Garfunkel's "Homeward Bound" for one of MasterCard's "Priceless" advertisements
- 2008: Co-produced the first EP, No One Will Know, of New York band The Spring Standards
- 2009: Appeared as a member of the musical ensemble in the 30 Rock episode Kidney Now!
- 2019: On 1/23/19 Miller announced the 1/24 start of his podcast, Wheels Off, subtitled A Show About the Messy Reality Behind the Creative Life. In partnership with Revoice Media, it's an 11-episode series; each segment features host Miller conversing with musicians, writers, artists, actors, comedians and other creative people about the pivotal moments that shaped their work, what it means to create in a digital age and grappling with the challenges and joys of living a creative life.

=== Awards ===
In 2025, Miller's band the Old 97's received a Lifetime Achievement award from the Americana Music Association.

== Philanthropy ==
In 2006, Miller and his brother Ross Miller launched the Breathe Easy Concert Series, an annual event in Dallas that raises money for the Cystic Fibrosis Foundation and awareness about cystic fibrosis.

In 2016, Miller appeared as part of the Okay to Say initiative sponsored by the Meadows Mental Health Policy Institute in Dallas, which encourages the use of therapy to prevent suicide and address mental health issues. In the campaign, Miller discusses his own suicide attempt when he was 14 years old, and how therapy has helped him over the years. Miller said that Jason Isbell encouraged him to talk publicly about his sobriety.

== Personal life ==
In 1997, Miller moved from Dallas to Los Angeles. In 2000, he moved to New York City. Miller and his then-fiancée, Erica Iahn, lived three blocks south of the World Trade Center and were at home on 9/11. He shared journal writing about their experience, which was published in The Atlantic in September 2011. Miller now lives in New York's Hudson Valley.

In 2002, Miller married former model Erica Iahn a week after he completed production of The Instigator. Iahn found out she was pregnant with their first child, Max, while Miller was on tour with Tori Amos to promote the album. Their daughter, Soleil, was born in the spring of 2006.

Miller said he got the nickname "Rhett" because his mother liked Rhett Butler from the movie Gone with the Wind.

== Discography ==
=== Studio albums ===
Title	Details	Peak chart positions	
Title	Details	US	US Rock
Mythologies	Released: 1989; Label: Carpe Diem; Format: LP, CD	—	—
The Instigator	Released: September 24, 2002; Label: Elektra; Format: LP, CD	126	—
The Believer	Released: February 28, 2006; Label: Verve Forecast; Format: LP, CD	138	—
Rhett Miller	Released: June 9, 2009; Label: Shout!; Format: LP, CD, streaming	128	50
The Dreamer	Released: June 5, 2012; Label: Maximum Sunshine; Format: LP, CD, streaming	139	50
The Traveler	Released: May 12, 2015; Label: ATO; Format: LP, CD, streaming	—	27
The Messenger	Released: November 9, 2018; Label: ATO; Format: LP, CD, streaming	—	—
The Misfit	Released: September 16, 2022; Label: ATO; Format: LP, CD, streaming	—	—
A Lifetime of Riding by Night	Released: October 10, 2025; Label: ATO; Format: LP, CD, streaming	—	—

=== Live albums ===
- 2011: The Interpreter: Live at Largo (Maximum Sunshine Records)

=== Singles ===
Year	Single	Peak positions	Album
Year	Single	US AAA	Album
2002	"Our Love"	—	The Instigator
2002	"Come Around"	7	The Instigator
2006	"Help Me, Suzanne"	—	The Believer
2009	"I Need to Know Where I Stand"	—	Rhett Miller
2012	"Out of Love"	—	The Dreamer
2015	"Most in the Summertime"	—	The Traveler
2018	"Total Disaster"	28	The Messenger
"—" denotes releases that did not chart

=== Other contributions ===
- 2003: The Executioner's Last Songs: Volumes 2 & 3 (Bloodshot Records) – "Dang Me"
- 2005: This Bird Has Flown - A 40th Anniversary Tribute to the Beatles' Rubber Soul (Razor & Tie) – "Girl"

== Filmography ==
Year	Title	Role	Notes
2006	The Break-Up	Himself	Cameo
2007	Golden Days	Himself	Documentary
2009	30 Rock	Himself	Episode: "Kidney Now!"
2022	The Guardians of the Galaxy Holiday Special	Bzermikitokolok	Television special
2023	Guardians of the Galaxy Vol. 3	Bzermikitokolok	

== Works and publications ==
Chronological order

- McSweeney's 12: Twelve New Stories from Twelve New Writers. Unpublished, Unknown, or, Unbelievable Plus Twenty-Nine Stories Written in Twenty Minutes Each. and a Story from Roddy Doyle. in Over Two Dimensions. Almost Three. San Francisco, CA: McSweeney's Quarterly. 2003. ISBN 978-1-93-241606-0. OCLC 54697932.
- Miller, Rhett (2009). "Tender 'Til The Day I Die". In Schaper, Julie; Horwitz, Steven (eds.). Amplified: Fiction from Leading Alt-Country, Indie Rock, Blues and Folk Musicians. Brooklyn, N.Y.: Melville House. pp. 171–182. ISBN 978-1-93-363371-8. OCLC 297148858. – short story
- Miller, Rhett (September 2011). "About That Day: A diary of 9/11". The Atlantic.
- Miller, Rhett (24 May 2012). "Trust me on this: David Bowie's "Hunky Dory"". Salon. Archived from the original on May 24, 2012.
- Miller, Rhett (12 January 2015). "We Could Have Been Cowboys". Sports Illustrated.
- Miller, Rhett (15 January 2016). "David Bowie was my North Star: My peace and escape was in his music, especially side two of "Hunky Dory"". Salon. Archived from the original on January 17, 2016.
- Miller, Rhett (4 December 2017). "The Loneliness of the Long Distance Rocker". The Baffler.
- Miller, Rhett; Santat (art by), Dan (2019). No More Poems! A Book in Verse That Just Gets Worse. New York: Little, Brown and Company. ISBN 978-0-316-41652-8. OCLC 1089741084. - poetry
