= List of people from Naperville, Illinois =

The following list includes notable people who were born or have lived in Naperville, Illinois, a city in the United States. For a similar list organized alphabetically by last name, see the category page People from Naperville, Illinois.

== Authors and academics ==
- Andrea Beaty, author
- Shane Gericke, author
- Emily Giffin, author
- Louise Huffman, teacher and educator on US Antarctic programs
- Fazlur Rahman Malik, author, scholar
- Paul Sereno, paleontologist
- Luis Alberto Urrea, author
- Jasmine Warga, children's and young adult author
- May Theilgaard Watts, naturalist and author; led efforts to establish the Illinois Prairie Path

== Media and arts ==
- Dave Allen, actor
- Andrew Baggarly, baseball journalist
- Dave Bickler, singer for Survivor
- Paul Brittain, actor and comedian
- Belmont Cameli, actor
- Steve Cochran, radio talk personality, WGN-AM; lives in Naperville
- David Eigenberg, actor
- Gina Glocksen, American Idol finalist
- Adrian Holovaty, journalist and web developer; creator of Django web framework
- James Holzhauer, Jeopardy all-time record-holder for one-day winnings
- P. J. Hyett, software developer and co-founder of GitHub
- Harry Kalas, sportscaster, voice of Philadelphia Phillies 1971–2009
- Alan Krashesky, news anchor, WLS-TV
- Dick Locher, editorial writer and Dick Tracy cartoonist
- Gary Miller, sportscaster
- Marisol Nichols, actress, mostly known for her role as Hermione Lodge on Riverdale
- Matthew Prozialeck, musician, blues harmonica player, recording artist, music producer
- Bill Odenkirk, comedy writer, The Simpsons
- Bob Odenkirk, actor, comedian, writer, director, producer, star of Better Call Saul
- Danielle Panabaker, actress most notable for her role as Dr. Caitlin Snow on The Flash; spent her teenage years in Naperville.
- Kay Panabaker, child actress (Phil of the Future, No Ordinary Family); raised in Naperville
- Chris Redd, cast member on Saturday Night Live
- Alene Robertson, musical theatre actress, winner of nine Joseph Jefferson Awards and 2014 Sarah Siddons Award
- Andrew Santino, actor, comedian, and podcaster
- Hillary Scott, pornographic actress
- Jim Sonefeld, drummer for Hootie and the Blowfish
- Kim Spencer, founder of the WorldLink direct broadcast satellite channel
- Darling Squire, dancer and choreographer
- John Summit, music producer and DJ, born in Naperville
- Doug Walker, web reviewer, Nostalgia Critic
- Trevor Wallace, comedian and content creator
- Paula Zahn, newscaster and television personality

== Politics ==
- Mary Lou Cowlishaw, politician
- Bill Foster, U.S. representative from Illinois's 11th congressional district
- S. Fitzgerald Haney, diplomat and businessman
- Dick Locher, syndicated cartoonist
- Joseph Naper, shipbuilder, businessman, politician, settler, founder of Naperville
- A. George Pradel, longest-serving mayor in city's history
- J. Glenn Schneider, educator and politician
- Lauren Underwood, U.S. representative from Illinois's 14th congressional district
- Robert Zoellick, former president of the World Bank Group

== Sports ==
=== Baseball ===
- Ryan Bukvich, relief pitcher
- Bert Haas, first baseman; all-star for the Cincinnati Reds
- Jerry Hairston Jr., infielder and outfielder; World Series champion with the New York Yankees
- Ian Krol, pitcher for the Saraperos de Saltillo of the Mexican League
- Nicky Lopez, infielder, who has played for multiple teams, including the Chicago White Sox, the Kansas City Royals, and the Chicago Cubs.
- Collin McHugh, relief pitcher; World Series champion with the Houston Astros
- Nick Solak, second baseman and outfielder

=== Basketball ===
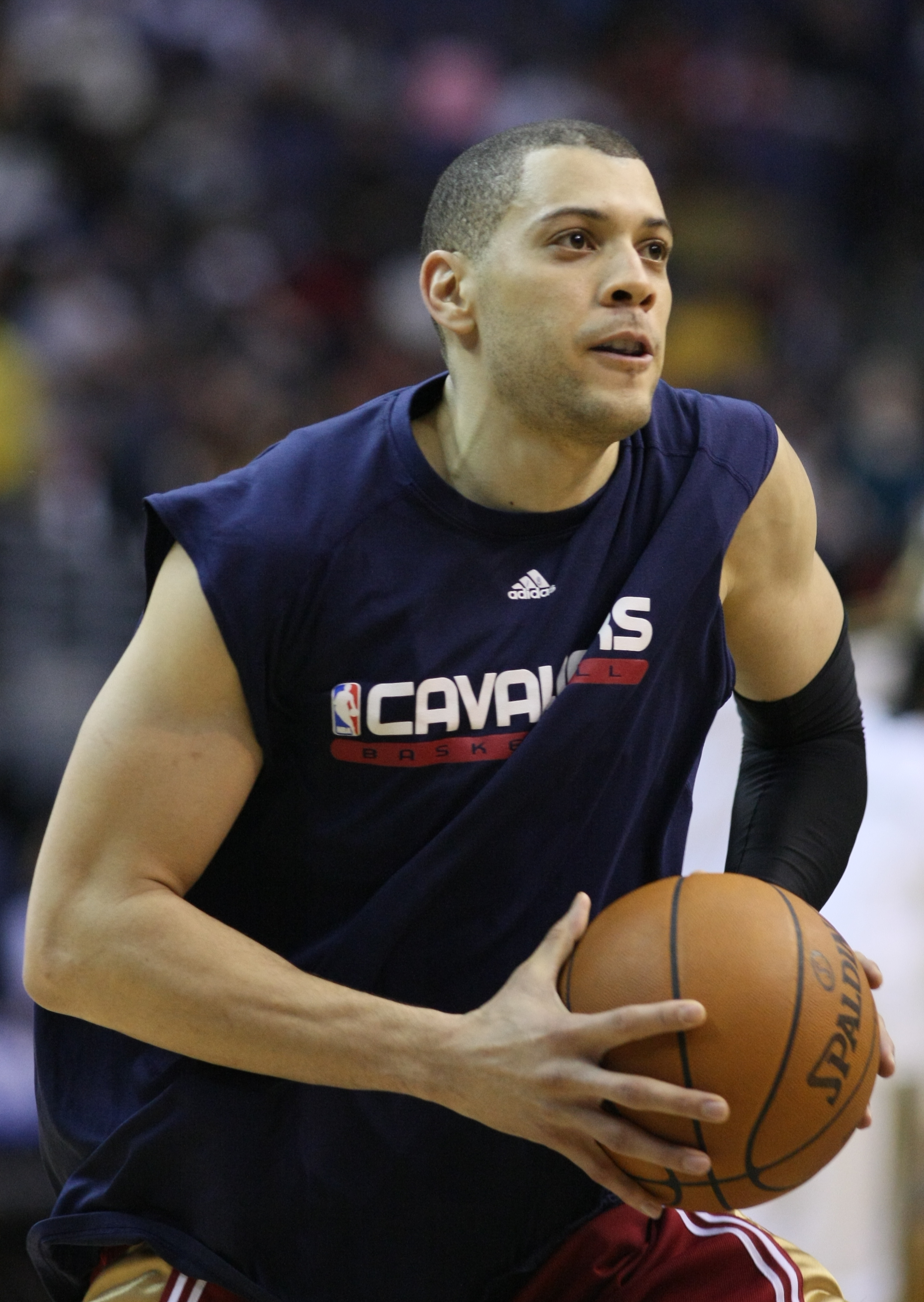
Anthony Parker with the Cavaliers

- John Clawson, small forward for the University of Michigan and Oakland Oaks; Olympic gold medalist
- Drew Crawford, shooting guard and small forward in the Israeli Basketball Premier League
- Porter Moser, head coach of the University of Oklahoma men's basketball team
- Anthony Parker, general manager of the Orlando Magic; shooting guard and small forward in the Israeli Super League and EuroLeague
- Candace Parker, power forward for the Los Angeles Sparks, Chicago Sky, and Las Vegas Aces; three-time WNBA champion; two-time WNBA MVP; two-time Olympic gold medalist

=== Football ===
- Cameron Brate, tight end for the Tampa Bay Buccaneers and New Orleans Saints
- Chris Brown, running back for the Tennessee Titans and Houston Texans
- Owen Daniels, tight end for the Houston Texans and Denver Broncos
- Mike Dudek, wide receiver for the Illinois Fighting Illini
- Matt LaCosse, tight end for the New York Giants and New England Patriots
- Justin McCareins, wide receiver for the Tennessee Titans and New York Jets
- Babatunde Oshinowo, defensive lineman for the Cleveland Browns
- Sean Payton, head coach for the Denver Broncos
- Jayden Reed, wide receiver and punt returner for the Green Bay Packers

=== Gymnastics ===
- Bridgette Caquatto, gymnast on U.S national team World silver medalist
- Mackenzie Caquatto, gymnast on U.S national team
- Nia Dennis, gymnast on U.S. national team

=== Ice skating ===
- Evan Lysacek, figure skater; Olympic gold medalist (2010), 2-time national champion

=== Mountain climbing ===
- Lucy Westlake, youngest American woman to summit Mount Everest

=== Prize fighting ===
- Curtis Blaydes, UFC fighter
- Jordan Johnson, RFA World Champ, UFC fighter
- Steve Kozola, MMA fighter

=== Soccer ===
- Chase Adams, forward
- Devon Amoo-Mensah, defender
- Brittany Bock, midfielder
- Chris Brady, goalkeeper
- Roman Celentano, goalkeeper
- Bryan Ciesiulka, midfielder
- Vanessa DiBernardo, midfielder
- Casey Krueger, defender
- Megan Montefusco, defender
- Korede Osundina, forward

=== Swimming ===
- Kevin Cordes, Olympic gold medalist in 4x100-meter medley relay, American record holder in 100- and 200-meter breaststroke (short course), as well as 100- and 200-yard breaststroke

=== Track and field ===
- Chris Derrick, distance runner at Stanford, held junior record in 5000m
- Tyler Jermann, distance runner, 4-time U.S. Olympic Trials qualifier in the marathon
- Tom Petranoff, javelin thrower, former world record holder, Olympian

=== Volleyball ===
- Jordyn Poulter, Olympic gold medalist for the United States national indoor volleyball team & professional volleyball player
