= 2015 Washington Spirit season =

Washington Spirit
2015 season
- General manager: Chris Hummer
- Head coach: Mark Parsons
- Stadium: Maryland SoccerPlex
- NWSL: 4th place (semifinals loss)
- Top goalscorer: League: Crystal Dunn (15); All: Crystal Dunn (15)
- Highest home attendance: 5,708 (Sept. 1 vs. Seattle Reign FC)
- Lowest home attendance: 1,267 (June 27 vs. Houston Dash)
- Average home league attendance: 4,087
- Biggest win: Washington Spirit 3–0 Seattle Reign FC (Maryland SoccerPlex, Germantown, Maryland; July 18, 2015)
- Biggest defeat: Seattle Reign FC 3–0 Washington Spirit (Moda Pitch at Memorial Stadium, Seattle, Washington; September 1, 2015)
Home colors	Away colors
- All statistics correct as of November 12, 2016.

The 2015 season was Washington Spirit's third season of existence in which they competed in the National Women's Soccer League, the top division of women's soccer in the United States.

== Review ==
Building off 2014's playoff achievement, the Spirit added a few key contributors including midfielder Joanna Lohman (from Boston Breakers), defenders Megan Oyster (drafted out of UCLA) and Katherine Reynolds (from Western New York Flash), and Nigerian international Francisca Ordega (signed from Piteå IF). The season also served as the breakout year for Crystal Dunn who was awarded the 2015 NWSL Golden Boot Award, scoring 15 goals during the campaign.

The Spirit finished the 2015 season with a record of 8-6-6 and repeating their 4th place league position. The playoff result, again, ended in an away loss to Seattle in the semifinals.

At the conclusion of the season, Mark Parsons stepped down as head coach and general manager to take over as coach of the Portland Thorns FC.

== Club ==
=== Roster ===
As of May 15, 2017

Note: Flags indicate national team as defined under FIFA eligibility rules; some limited exceptions apply. Players may hold more than one non-FIFA nationality.

No.	Pos.	Nation	Player
1	GK	USA	Ashlyn Harris (FP)
2	DF	USA	Katherine Reynolds
3	DF	USA	Caprice Dydasco
4	DF	USA	Megan Oyster
5	DF	USA	Whitney Church
6	DF	USA	Angela Salem
7	MF	USA	Christine Nairn
8	MF	CAN	Diana Matheson (FP)
9	FW	ESP	Laura del Río
10	FW	USA	Caroline Miller
11	DF	USA	Ali Krieger (FP)
12	DF	NGA	Josephine Chukwunonye
13	MF	POR	Amanda DaCosta
14	FW	NGA	Francisca Ordega

No.	Pos.	Nation	Player
15	MF	USA	Joanna Lohman
16	FW	USA	Tiffany Weimer
17	MF	MEX	Verónica Pérez (FP)
18	GK	USA	Kelsey Wys
19	DF	USA	Crystal Dunn (FP)
20	FW	AUS	Hayley Raso
21	DF	USA	Alex Singer
22	DF	MEX	Arianna Romero (FP)
23	MF	USA	Tori Huster
24	DF	USA	Estelle Johnson
25	MF	NGA	Ngozi Okobi
26	FW	ARG	Estefanía Banini
28	DF	USA	Jennifer Skogerboe*
30	GK	USA	Lyndse Hokanson*

- (FP) = Federation player

* – denotes amateur call-ups

=== Team management ===
Owner	Bill Lynch
General Manager	Mark Parsons
Head Coach	Mark Parsons

== Competitions ==
=== Regular season ===
April 10, Fri 1	Houston Dash	2–0	Washington Spirit	Houston
20:30 EDT (UTC−04)	Lloyd 45+'; Ohai 51'; Masar (yellow card) 71'	Report		Stadium: BBVA Compass Stadium; Attendance: 6,012; Referee: Katja Koroleva

April 18, Sat 2	Washington Spirit	3–1	FC Kansas City	Germantown, Maryland
19:00 EDT (UTC−04)	Nairn 9', 65'; Huster (yellow card) 27'; Dunn 46'; Salem (yellow card) 56'	Report	O'Reilly 6'; LePeilbet (yellow card) 64'; Groom (yellow card) 95'	Stadium: Maureen Hendricks Field Maryland SoccerPlex; Attendance: 4,136; Referee: Matthew Richardson

April 26, Sun 3	Sky Blue FC	1–3	Washington Spirit	Piscataway, New Jersey
18:00 EDT (UTC−04)	Freels 62' (Nadim)	Report	Dunn 6' (Ordega) 40' (unassisted); Nairn 48' (Ordega)	Stadium: Yurcak Field; Attendance: 953; Referee: Farhad Dadkho

May 2, Sat 4	Seattle Reign FC	3–1	Washington Spirit	Seattle, Washington
22:00 EDT (UTC−04)	Yanez 36' (Mathias); Mathias 48' (Little); Fishlock 75' (Little)	Report	Lohman 63' (Dunn)	Stadium: Memorial Stadium; Attendance: 2,703; Referee: Karen Abt

May 9, Sat 5	Portland Thorns FC	2–2	Washington Spirit	Portland, Oregon
22:00 EDT (UTC−04)	Shim 28'; Van Hollebeke (yellow card) 34'; Long 51'	Report	Dunn 3'; Ordega 14'	Stadium: Providence Park; Attendance: 14,236; Referee: Elvis Mahmutovic

May 16, Sat 6	Washington Spirit	1–0	Sky Blue FC	Germantown, Maryland
19:00 EDT (UTC−04)	Ordega 92+' (Dunn)	Report		Stadium: Maureen Hendricks Field Maryland SoccerPlex; Attendance: 3,095; Referee: Margaret Domka

May 23, Sat 7	Western New York Flash	3–2	Washington Spirit	Rochester, New York
19:00 EDT (UTC−04)	Williams 11' (Spencer); Mewis 35' (Becky Edwards); Spencer 57' (Edmonds); Mewis (yellow card) 60'	Report	Nairn 22' (penalty); Oyster (yellow card) 32'; Dunn 55' (Nairn); Nairn (yellow card) 63'	Stadium: Sahlen's Stadium; Attendance: 2,110; Referee: Elvis Mahmutovic

May 30, Sat 8	Washington Spirit	2–1	Portland Thorns FC	Germantown, Maryland
19:00 EDT (UTC−04)	DaCosta 26' (unassisted); Dunn 28' (unassisted); Johnson (yellow card) 61'	Report	Anonma 18' (Long); Long (yellow card) 57'; Williamson (yellow card) 61'; Farrelly (yellow card) 71'; Jackson (yellow card) 72'	Stadium: Maureen Hendricks Field Maryland SoccerPlex; Attendance: 3,519; Referee: Farhad Dadkho

June 6, Sat 9	Washington Spirit	1–1	Boston Breakers	Germantown, Maryland
19:00 EDT (UTC−04)	DaCosta 64' (unassisted); Nairn (yellow card) 58'	Report	Evans 65' (unassisted); Kallman (yellow card) 91+'	Stadium: Maureen Hendricks Field Maryland SoccerPlex; Attendance: 3,081; Referee: Levi Rippy

June 20, Sat	Chicago Red Stars	abandoned	Washington Spirit	Lisle, Illinois
20:00 EDT (UTC−04)		Report		Stadium: Village of Lisle-Benedictine University Sports Complex
Note: rescheduled for August 16

June 27, Sat 10	Washington Spirit	1–0	Houston Dash	Germantown, Maryland
19:00 EDT (UTC−04)	Dunn 56' (unassisted)	Report	Pereira (yellow card) 55'; Brush (yellow card) 78'	Stadium: Maureen Hendricks Field Maryland SoccerPlex; Attendance: 1,267; Referee: Matthew Franz

July 3, Fri 11	FC Kansas City	3–0	Washington Spirit	Kansas City, Missouri
20:00 EDT (UTC−04)	Avebuch 27' (unassisted); Groom 53' (Silva); Bogus 65' (Robinson)	Report	Johnson (yellow card) 26'	Stadium: Swope Soccer Village; Attendance: 2,079; Referee: Tori Penso

July 18, Sat 12	Washington Spirit	3–0	Seattle Reign FC	Germantown, Maryland
19:00 EDT (UTC−04)	Da Costa 46' (Del Rio); Dunn 69' (Matheson); Nairn 83' (unassisted); Reynolds (yellow card) 31'; Del Rio (yellow card) 66'	Report	Corsie (yellow card) 20'	Stadium: Maureen Hendricks Field Maryland SoccerPlex; Attendance: 5,413; Referee: Christopher Spivey

July 25, Sat 13	Washington Spirit	1–1	Chicago Red Stars	Germantown, Maryland
19:00 EDT (UTC−04)	Dunn 83' (unassisted)	Report	Press 31' (unassisted); Hemmings (yellow card) 74'	Stadium: Maureen Hendricks Field Maryland SoccerPlex; Attendance: 5,100; Referee: Brandon Artis

August 1, Sat 14	Washington Spirit	3–1	Houston Dash	Germantown, Maryland
19:00 EDT (UTC−04)	Dunn 28' (unassisted) 36' (Matheson) 46+' (Nairn)	Report	McDonald 74' (Ohai)	Stadium: Maureen Hendricks Field Maryland SoccerPlex; Attendance: 1,267; Referee: Matthew Franz

August 8, Sat 15	Boston Breakers	2–1	Washington Spirit	Boston, Massachusetts
19:00 EDT (UTC−04)	King 12' (Mewis); Simon 38' (unassisted); Simon (yellow card) 30'; Ezurike (yellow card) 79'; McCaffrey (yellow card) 90'	Report	Matheson 49' (unassisted); Oyster (yellow card) 33'; Salem (yellow card) 85'	Stadium: Soldiers Field Soccer Stadium; Attendance: 4,137; Referee: Danielle Chesky

August 12, Wed 16	Washington Spirit	1–1	Western New York Flash	Germantown, Maryland
19:00 EDT (UTC−04)	Matheson 16' (unassisted)	Report	Williams 90' (unassisted)	Stadium: Maureen Hendricks Field Maryland SoccerPlex; Attendance: 4,101; Referee: Tori Penso

August 16, Sun 17	Chicago Red Stars	1–2	Washington Spirit	Lisle, Illinois
20:30 EDT (UTC−04)	Tancredi 82' (Mautz); Lomnicki (yellow card) 44'	Report	Oyster 3' (Nairn); Dunn 90+2' (unassisted)	Stadium: Village of Lisle-Benedictine University Sports Complex; Attendance: 2,470; Referee: Levi Rippy
Note: rescheduled from June 20, 2015

August 27, Thu 18	FC Kansas City	0–0	Washington Spirit	Kansas City, Missouri
20:00 EDT (UTC−04)		Report	Huster (yellow card) 53'; Okobi (yellow card) 76'; Matheson (yellow card) 79'	Stadium: Swope Soccer Village; Attendance: 2,492; Referee: Randall Kelley

August 30, Sun 19	Portland Thorns FC	3–3	Washington Spirit	Portland, Oregon
21:00 EDT (UTC−04)	Morgan 53' (Sanderson); Heath 71' (Penalty); Taylor 80' (Morgan); Long (yellow card) 67'; Williamson (yellow card) 86'	Report	Ordega 6' (Dunn); Dunn 46+' (Nairn); 81' (Unassisted); Matheson (yellow card) 17'	Stadium: Providence Park; Attendance: 21,144; Referee: Ekaterina Koroleva

September 5, Sat 20	Washington Spirit	1–2	Seattle Reign FC	Germantown, Maryland
19:00 EDT (UTC−04)	Matheson 37' (pen.); Johnson (yellow card) 80'; Raso (yellow card) 88'	Report	Fishlock 15'; Rapinoe 25'; Veje (yellow card) 54'; Little (yellow card) 77'	Stadium: Maureen Hendricks Field Maryland SoccerPlex; Attendance: 5,708; Referee: Brandon Artis

==== Regular-season standings ====
Pos	Team	Pld	W	D	L	GF	GA	GD	Pts	Qualification
1	Seattle Reign FC	20	13	4	3	41	21	+20	43	NWSL Shield
2	Chicago Red Stars	20	8	9	3	31	22	+9	33	NWSL Playoffs
3	FC Kansas City (C)	20	9	5	6	32	20	+12	32	NWSL Playoffs
4	Washington Spirit	20	8	6	6	31	28	+3	30	NWSL Playoffs
5	Houston Dash	20	6	6	8	21	26	−5	24	
6	Portland Thorns FC	20	6	5	9	27	29	−2	23	
7	Western New York Flash	20	6	5	9	24	34	−10	23	
8	Sky Blue FC	20	5	7	8	22	28	−6	22	
9	Boston Breakers	20	4	3	13	22	43	−21	15	

Source: NWSL
Rules for classification: Tiebreakers
(C) Champions

==== Results summary ====
Overall								Home						Away					
Pld	W	D	L	GF	GA	GD	Pts	W	D	L	GF	GA	GD	W	D	L	GF	GA	GD
20	8	6	6	31	28	+3	30	6	3	1	17	8	+9	2	3	5	14	20	−6

Last updated: September 7, 2015.
Source: Match reports

Round	1	2	3	4	5	6	7	8	9	10	11	12	13	14	15	16	17	18	19	20
Stadium	A	H	A	A	A	H	A	H	H	H	A	H	H	H	A	H	A	A	A	H
Result	L	W	W	L	D	W	L	W	D	W	L	W	D	W	L	D	W	D	D	L

Updated to match(es) played on September 7, 2015. Source: Match reports
A = Away; H = Home; W = Win; D = Draw; L = Loss

=== NWSL Playoffs ===
September 13, Sun semifinal	Seattle Reign FC	3–0	Washington Spirit	Seattle, Washington
18:30 PDT (UTC−07)	Mathias (yellow card) 52'; Yanez 25' (Rapinoe); Rapinoe 75' (Little); Bullock 90'	Report		Stadium: Moda Pitch at Memorial Stadium; Attendance: 5,021; Referee: Christopher Spivey

== Squad statistics ==
Source: NWSL

Key to positions: FW – Forward, MF – Midfielder, DF – Defender, GK – Goalkeeper

N	Pos	Player	GP	GS	Min	G	A	WG	Shot	SOG	Cro	CK	Off	Foul	FS	YC	RC
26	FW	Estefania Banini	4	4	308	0	0	0	7	3	0	0	0	3	3	0	0
12	DF	Josephine Chukwunonye	2	1	55	0	0	0	0	0	2	0	0	1	2	0	0
5	DF	Whitney Church	16	15	1364	0	0	0	4	3	0	0	0	4	3	0	0
13	MF	Amanda DaCosta	17	7	646	3	0	1	6	4	0	1	2	8	6	0	0
9	FW	Laura del Rio	11	8	698	0	2	0	15	6	0	0	3	5	16	1	0
19	FW	Crystal Dunn	20	19	1711	15	3	6	84	48	3	0	35	20	26	0	0
3	DF	Caprice Dydasco	6	1	196	0	0	0	0	0	0	0	1	0	1	0	0
23	DF	Tori Huster	17	13	1177	0	0	0	11	4	1	0	0	15	12	3	0
24	DF	Estelle Johnson	19	18	1685	0	0	0	5	1	0	0	0	12	3	3	0
11	DF	Ali Krieger	8	8	655	0	0	0	3	0	0	0	2	1	6	0	0
15	MF	Joanna Lohman	17	15	1216	1	0	0	17	9	0	0	4	10	15	0	0
8	MF	Diana Matheson	9	7	633	3	2	0	10	5	1	0	6	2	6	2	0
10	FW	Caroline Miller	2	0	5	0	0	0	0	0	0	1	0	0	0	0	0
7	MF	Christine Nairn	20	19	1701	5	4	0	42	20	2	73	2	9	19	2	0
25	FW	Ngozi Okobi	4	0	67	0	0	0	0	0	0	0	0	2	1	1	0
14	FW	Francisca Ordega	13	11	996	3	2	1	27	17	1	0	8	16	21	0	0
4	DF	Megan Oyster	20	20	1800	1	0	0	5	1	0	0	0	8	9	3	0
20	MF	Hayley Raso	8	1	182	0	0	0	3	1	1	0	1	4	4	1	0
2	DF	Katherine Reynolds	18	18	1611	0	0	0	1	0	1	0	0	14	4	1	0
6	MF	Angela Salem	15	12	981	0	1	0	7	3	0	13	1	7	10	2	0
21	DF	Alex Singer	5	3	274	0	0	0	1	0	0	0	0	0	2	0	0
28	DF	Jennifer Skogerboe	1	0	1	0	0	0	0	0	0	0	0	0	0	0	0
16	FW	Tiffany Weimer	4	0	38	0	0	0	0	0	0	0	1	0	0	0	0

N	Pos	Goal keeper	GP	GS	Min	W	L	T	Shot	SOG	Sav	GA	GA/G	Pen	PKF	SO
1	GK	Ashlyn Harris	9	9	810	3	2	4	126	60	47	12	1.333	1	1	1
18	GK	Kelsey Wys	11	11	990	5	4	2	121	51	35	16	1.455	0	1	3

== Transfers ==
=== In ===
No.	Pos.	Player	Transferred from	Fee/notes	Date	Source
2	DF	(United States) Katherine Reynolds	(United States) Western New York Flash	Trade for Angeli	October 21, 2014	
6	DF	(United States) Angela Salem	(United States) Western New York Flash	Trade for Angeli	October 21, 2014	
15	MF	(United States) Joanna Lohman	(United States) Boston Breakers	Signed	October 22, 2014	
13	MF	(United States) Amanda DaCosta	(England) Liverpool L.F.C.	Signed	October 24, 2014	
22	DF	(Mexico) Arianna Romero	(United States) Houston Dash	Trade for Cross	December 2, 2014	
4	DF	(United States) Megan Oyster	(United States) UCLA Bruins	2015 NWSL College Draft – 2nd Round	January 19, 2015	
3	DF	(United States) Caprice Dydasco	(United States) Pali Blues	2015 NWSL College Draft – 3rd Round	January 19, 2015	
5	DF	(United States) Whitney Church	(United States) Penn State Nittany Lions	2015 NWSL College Draft – 4th Round	January 19, 2015	
26	FW	(Argentina) Estefanía Banini	(Chile) Colo-Colo	Signed	January 22, 2015	
24	DF	(United States) Estelle Johnson	(United States) Western New York Flash	Trade for Pressley	February 24, 2015	
9	FW	(Spain) Laura del Río	(England) Bristol City W.F.C.	Signed	March 12, 2015	
14	FW	(Nigeria) Francisca Ordega	(Sweden) Piteå IF	Signed	March 24, 2015	
12	DF	(Nigeria) Josephine Chukwunonye	(Nigeria) Rivers Angels F.C.	Signed	June 11, 2015	
20	FW	(Australia) Hayley Raso	(Australia) Brisbane Roar	Signed	June 11, 2015	
25	MF	(Nigeria) Ngozi Okobi	(Nigeria) Delta Queens F.C.	Signed	June 23, 2015	

=== Out ===
No.	Pos.	Player	Transferred to	Fee/notes	Date	Source
6	MF	(United States) Lori Lindsey	N/A	Retired	August 14, 2014	
24	FW	(Australia) Lisa De Vanna	(Australia) Melbourne Victory		September 3, 2014	
28	DF	(United States) Jordan Angeli	(United States) Western New York Flash	Trade for Reynolds and Salem	October 21, 2014	
4	MF	(United States) Yael Averbuch	(United States) FC Kansas City		November 7, 2014	
12	DF	(United States) Niki Cross	(United States) Houston Dash	Trade for Romero	December 2, 2014	
3	DF	(United States) Toni Pressley	(United States) Western New York Flash	Trade for Johnson	February 24, 2015	
10	MF	(United States) Caroline Miller		Waived	May 28, 2015	
21	DF	(United States) Alex Singer	(Norway) Avaldsnes IL	Waived	June 17, 2015	
9	FW	(Mexico) Renae Cuéllar				
15	DF	(Canada) Robyn Gayle				

== Honors and awards ==
=== NWSL Yearly Awards ===
==== NWSL Most Valuable Player ====
Player	Result	Ref.
(United States) Crystal Dunn	Won	

==== NWSL Golden Boot ====
Player	Result	Goals	Ref.
(United States) Crystal Dunn	Won	15	

==== NWSL Team of the Year ====
Team	Position	Player	Ref.
Best XI	Defender	(United States) Crystal Dunn	
Second X1	Defender	(United States) Ali Krieger	

==== NWSL Player of the Month ====
Month	Player	Month's Statline	Ref.
August	(United States) Crystal Dunn	6 Goals; 1 Assist; Spirit 2–13 in August	

== See also ==
- 2015 National Women's Soccer League season
