= Gericke =

Gericke is a surname. Notable people with the surname include:

- Arne Gericke (born 1964), German politician
- Frederick Gericke (born 1967), Keeper of Useless Knowledge, Jack of all Trades, born in Staten Island NY
- Carla Gericke (born 1972), American writer, activist, and former lawyer born in South Africa
- Hans Gericke (1912–2014), German architect and urban planner
- Helmuth Gericke (1909–2007), German mathematician
- Hermann Gericke (born 1931), Swiss swimmer
- Lisa Sophie Gericke (born 1995), German bobsledder
- Lothar Gericke (born 1950), German swimmer
- Michael Gericke (born 1956), American graphic designer
- Otto von Guericke (1602–1686), German scientist, inventor and politician whose name was spelled "Gericke" until 1666
- Samuel Theodor Gericke (1665–1730), German painter
- Shane Gericke, American novelist
- Walter Gericke (1907–1991), German paratroop officer in the Luftwaffe of Nazi Germany
- Wilhelm Gericke (1845–1925), Austrian-born conductor and composer
