= Tierney Darden v. City of Chicago =

- Court: Circuit Court of Cook County
- Full case name: Tierney Darden v. City of Chicago et al.
- Decided: August 24, 2017; 8 years ago
- Verdict: Plaintiff to be awarded $148,190,997

Court membership
- Judge sitting: Clare McWilliams

Tierney Darden v. City of Chicago was a civil court case in Cook County, Illinois. In August 2017, a jury awarded Tierney Darden $148 million for damages after a pedestrian shelter at Chicago's O'Hare International Airport collapsed, leaving Darden partially paralyzed. The case resulted in the highest compensatory verdict awarded to an individual in the state of Illinois, and one of the top five in the United States, excluding punitive damages, wrongful death claims, and imprisoned defendants.

== Background ==
In August 2015, Darden, then a 24-year-old Truman College student from Mundelein, Illinois, was standing with her mother and sister outside O'Hare's Terminal 2 waiting for transportation. A sudden storm enveloped the airport and the family sought shelter behind a pedestrian shelter. High winds toppled the 750-pound glass and steel structure onto Darden, severing her spine and leaving her paralyzed from the waist down. Her mother, Trudy Darden, and sister, Tayah Minniefeld, were also injured. Darden's injuries resulted in the permanent loss of leg use, chronic neuropathic pain, 24-hour care requirements, and 20 prescription medications. Her initial medical bills totaled $985,411.

The lawsuit prompted an investigation by CBS Chicago, which determined excessive rust had weakened the shelter support posts and bolts were missing. The investigation also revealed other shelters at the airport had missing bolts, corroded parts, or broken brackets.

== Case ==
Darden, with her mother and sister, filed a negligence lawsuit in the Illinois Circuit Court for Cook County against the City of Chicago and the City of Chicago Aviation Department. The case went to trial on August 10, 2017, with Judge Clare McWilliams presiding. Darden was represented by attorneys Patrick A. Salvi, Jeffrey J. Kroll, Tara R Devine, Patrick Salvi II, and Eirene N. Salvi from Salvi, Schostok & Pritchard P.C. "The City of Chicago's wrongful conduct forever changed the course of Tierney's life. She will never walk or dance again," said Kroll during opening statements. Chicago officials admitted wrongdoing prior to the trial, and their legal team, from the firms of Williams & Gundlach LLC and Dentons US LLP, offered $30 million in compensation.

Darden's counsel team asked the jury to award $174,934,582. After four hours of deliberation on August 23, the jury returned a verdict awarding $148,190,997. The city appealed, then settled for $115 million, still the highest personal injury payment in Illinois history.
