= Megan Montefusco =

American soccer player (born 1992)

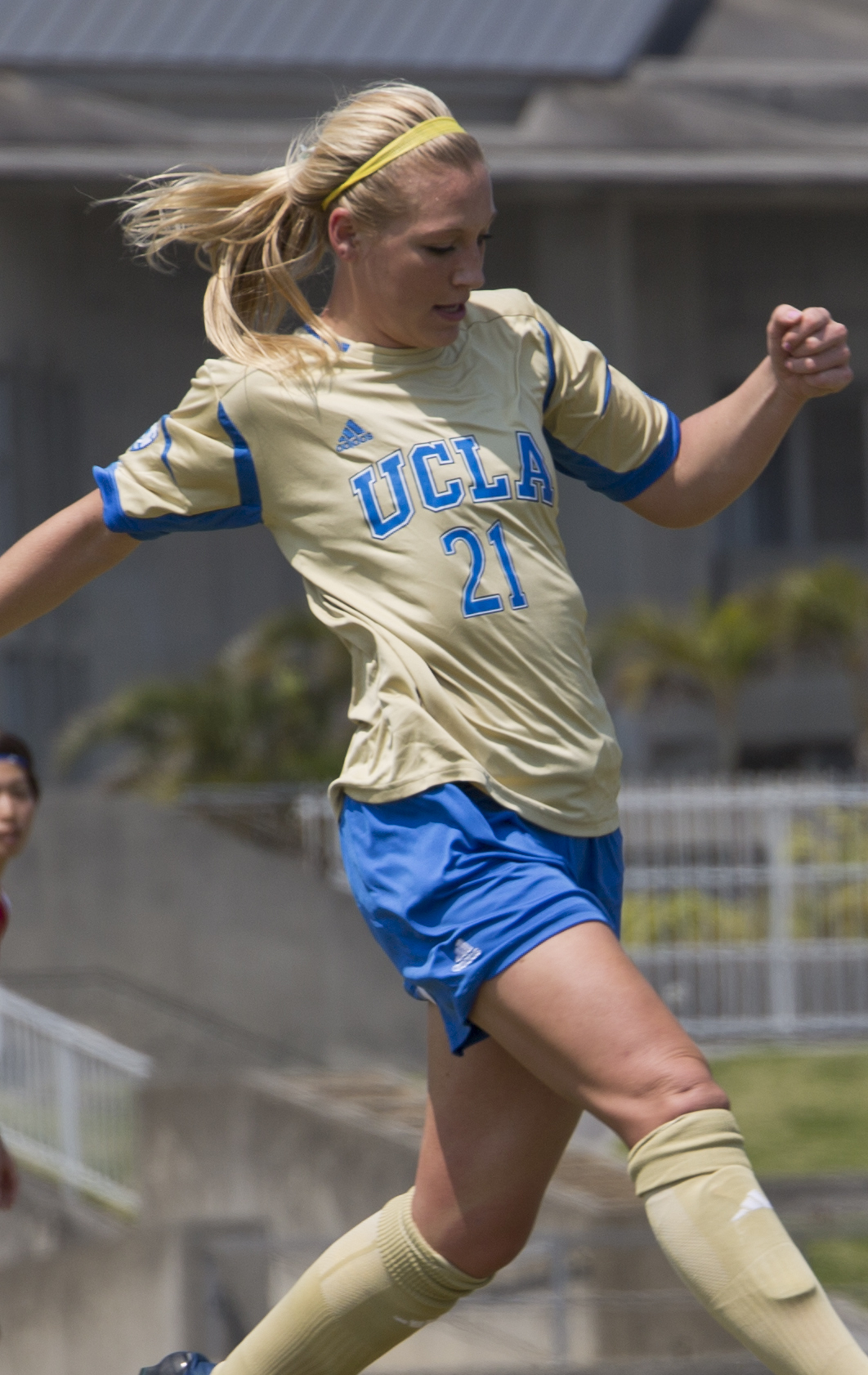
- Montefusco playing for the UCLA Bruins in 2014

Personal information
- Full name: Megan Leigh Montefusco
- Birth name: Megan Leigh Oyster
- Date of birth: September 3, 1992 (age 34)
- Place of birth: Naperville, Illinois, United States
- Height: 1.73 m (5 ft 8 in)
- Position: Defender

Youth career
- 1998–2011: Windy City Pride

College career
Years	Team	Apps	(Gls)
2011–2014	UCLA Bruins	90	(2)

Senior career*
Years	Team	Apps	(Gls)
2011	Chicago Red Stars (WPSL)	3	(0)
2015–2016	Washington Spirit	35	(1)
2015–2017	→ Newcastle Jets (loan)	24	(2)
2017	Boston Breakers	23	(0)
2018–2019	Reign FC	40	(1)
2020–2021	Houston Dash	21	(0)
2022–2024	Orlando Pride	36	(0)

International career^{‡}
2008	United States U17		
2011	United States U20		
2017	United States	2	(0)
- * Club domestic league appearances and goals as of October 15, 2023 ‡ National team caps and goals as of April 9, 2017

Megan Leigh Montefusco (née Oyster; born September 3, 1992) is an American retired professional soccer player who most recently played for Orlando Pride in the National Women's Soccer League and the United States national team. With the Pride she won the 2024 NWSL Championship.

Montefusco previously played for the Chicago Red Stars in the Women's Premier Soccer League, for the NWSL teams Washington Spirit, Boston Breakers, Reign FC, and Houston Dash (with whom she won the NWSL Challenge Cup), and the Australian W-League team Newcastle Jets.

== Early life ==
Raised in Naperville, Illinois, Montefusco attended Neuqua Valley High School where she led the soccer to team to a 24–0 record and first place national ranking. A four-time all-state selection and three-time NSCAA Youth All-American, she was named All-American by both ESPN RISE and Parade magazines in 2010, and won Gatorade State Player of the Year for Illinois the following year.

Montefusco played club soccer for Windy City Pride from 1998 to 2011 and was a member of the regional Olympic Development Program (ODP) for five years. Prior to leaving for college, Montefusco played briefly for the Chicago Red Stars in the Women's Premier Soccer League in 2011. Chicago topped the Midwest Conference North Division and reached the Championship final, eventually losing to Orange County Waves in extra-time 2–1.

=== Collegiate career ===
Montefusco attended the University of California, Los Angeles where she played four seasons of college soccer for the Bruins from 2011 to 2014 while majoring in sociology. She joined as the number 21 ranked recruit in the country and first in Illinois by Top Drawer Soccer. Montefusco played in 18 of 21 matches as a freshman under B. J. Snow, making seven starts. She scored her first Bruins goal and only goal of the 2011 season in a 1–0 win over Rutgers on September 4. In 2012, she made 22 appearances as a sophomore but none as a starter. In 2013 under new head coach Amanda Cromwell, Montefusco ranked fourth on the team in minutes played as the Bruins claimed the Pac-12 Conference title before also winning the first NCAA National Championship title in program history. She received All-Tournament honors and served the assist to the game-winning goal during the final, a 1–0 win in extra-time over Florida State Seminoles. As a senior in 2014, Montefusco started in all 24 of the Bruins' games and helped lead a defensive line that recorded a school record 19 shut-outs, allowing six goals on the year. UCLA retained the Pac-12 conference title and reached the 2014 NCAA College Cup quarterfinals before losing 2–1 to Virginia Cavaliers, the only game in 2014 in which the Bruins gave up more than one goal.

== Club career ==
=== Chicago Red Stars (WPSL) ===
Montefusco began her professional career in 2011 with the Chicago Red Stars, then playing in the second-tier Women's Premier Soccer League. The Red Stars won the North Division and, in the playoffs, made it to the final, but fell there to the Orange County Waves.

=== Washington Spirit, 2015–16 ===
Montefusco was selected in the second round (13th overall) of the 2015 NWSL College Draft by the Washington Spirit, one of an NWSL record six strong draft class out of UCLA in 2015. During the 2015 season, she started in all 20 matches for the team and became the first player in team history to play every minute of a single season. She scored one goal, the opener in a 2–1 victory away to the Chicago Red Stars on August 16. The Spirit finished fourth during the regular season with a 8–6–6 record to advance to the playoffs before losing 3–0 in the semifinals to Reign FC. Montefusco was named the 2015 Washington Spirit Defender of the Year and Newcomer of the Year. In 2016, she made 17 appearances for the Spirit as the team finished second in the regular season, two points off Portland Thorns FC for the NWSL Shield, and reached the NWSL Championship for the first time in club history before losing the final on penalties after a 2–2 tie with Western New York Flash.

=== Newcastle Jets (loans), 2015–17 ===
On October 8, 2015, Montefusco joined Australian W-League club Newcastle Jets on loan for the 2015–16 season during the NWSL offseason, and rejoined Newcastle for the 2016–17 season. The team finished 6th and 5th, missing the playoffs both seasons. At the end of the 2016–17 season, Montefusco was named to the Professional Footballers Australia (PFA) W-League Team of the Season.

=== Boston Breakers, 2017 ===
On November 17, 2016, it was announced that Montefusco had been acquired by the Boston Breakers via trade along with the No. 3 and No. 9 overall picks in the 2017 NWSL College Draft and the No. 2 spot in the Distribution Ranking Order in exchange for Kristie Mewis, Kassey Kallman and the No. 1 spot in the Distribution Ranking Order. She appeared in 23 of 24 matches during the 2017 season, playing the full 90 minutes in each as Boston finished second bottom ahead of Washington on goal difference.

=== Reign FC, 2018–19 ===
After Boston Breakers folded in January 2018, Montefusco was selected by Reign FC as the third pick in the 2018 NWSL Dispersal Draft. In her first season with Reign, Montefusco started 21 games and scored once as the team finished third, dropping from second with a final day defeat to Portland Thorns FC before losing in the playoff semifinals to the same opponent a week later. She was a starter in all 20 of her appearances in 2019 before missing the last month of the season with a knee injury.

=== Houston Dash, 2020–21 ===
On February 3, 2020, Houston Dash acquired Montefusco in a trade with Reign FC along with Shea Groom and a second-round pick in the 2022 NWSL Draft in exchange for Sofia Huerta and Amber Brooks. With the 2020 NWSL season canceled due to the COVID-19 pandemic, Montefusco eventually made her debut in the return to play replacement 2020 NWSL Challenge Cup tournament. She played in five games including the final as Houston beat the Chicago Red Stars 2–0 to claim the club's first trophy. Montefusco had missed the semifinal with fractured ribs but despite this, returned to the lineup and played the full 90 minutes in the final. She played every minute of the 2021 NWSL Challenge Cup and made a further 21 appearances during the regular season as Houston finished in seventh-place, missing the playoffs by one point.

=== Orlando Pride, 2022–24 ===
On January 28, 2022, Orlando Pride acquired Montefusco in a trade with Houston along with $30,000 in allocation money and a third-round pick in the 2023 NWSL Draft in exchange for Marisa Viggiano.

Before the beginning of the 2024 NWSL season, Montefusco underwent surgery on her right foot and was placed on the season-ending injury list. On November 1, 2024, she announced that she would retire at the end of the season. Although Montefusco was unable to play, Orlando won the NWSL Championship that year.

== International career ==
Montefusco represented the United States at the under-16, under-18 and under-20 national team levels. She received her first call-up to the United States senior team in March 2017 for a pair of friendlies against Russia. She debuted on April 6 as a 68th-minute substitute for Kelley O'Hara in a 4–0 win before appearing again as a substitute in the next game. In total, Montefusco played 58 minutes for the USWNT.

== Personal life ==
Montefusco's mother, Cindy, played softball and volleyball at Northern Illinois University. Her cousin, Brittany Bock, also played soccer professionally, overlapping NWSL careers in 2015 although the two never appeared in the same game.

On December 4, 2021, she married former professional Atlantic League and Frontier League baseball player Anthony Montefusco in a ceremony at Old Chicago Main Post Office. He proposed during a hot air balloon flight in Colorado in August 2020.

== Career statistics ==
=== Club ===
As of October 15, 2023.

Club	Season	League			Cup (Note: NWSL Challenge Cup)		Playoffs		Other		Total	
Club	Season	Division	Apps	Goals	Apps	Goals	Apps	Goals	Apps	Goals	Apps	Goals
Washington Spirit	2015	NWSL	20	1	—		1	0	—		21	1
Washington Spirit	2016	NWSL	15	0	—		2	0	—		17	0
Washington Spirit	Total		35	1	0	0	3	0	0	0	38	1
Newcastle Jets (loan)	2015–16	W-League	12	1	—		—		—		12	1
Newcastle Jets (loan)	2016–17	W-League	12	1	—		—		—		12	1
Newcastle Jets (loan)	Total		24	2	0	0	0	0	0	0	24	2
Boston Breakers	2017	NWSL	23	0	—		—		—		23	0
Reign FC	2018	NWSL	20	1	—		1	0	—		21	1
Reign FC	2019	NWSL	20	0	—		—		—		20	0
Reign FC	Total		40	1	0	0	1	0	0	0	41	1
Houston Dash	2020	NWSL	—		5	0	—		2 (Note: Includes the NWSL Fall Series)	0	7	0
Houston Dash	2021	NWSL	21	0	4	0	—		—		25	0
Houston Dash	Total		21	0	9	0	0	0	2	0	32	0
Orlando Pride	2022	NWSL	21	0	5	0	—		—		26	0
Orlando Pride	2023	NWSL	15	0	4	1	—		—		19	1
Orlando Pride	Total		36	0	9	1	0	0	0	0	45	1
Career total			179	4	18	1	4	0	2	0	203	5

=== International ===
As of April 9, 2017

Appearances and goals by national team and year
National team	Year	Apps	Goals
United States	2017	2	0
Total		2	0

== Honors ==
UCLA Bruins

- Pac-12 Conference regular season: 2013, 2014
- NCAA Women's College Cup: 2013

Houston Dash

- NWSL Challenge Cup: 2020

Orlando Pride

- NWSL Championship: 2024

Individual

- Gatorade State Player of the Year (Illinois): 2011
- PFA W-League Team of the Season: 2016–17

== See also ==
- List of people from Naperville, Illinois
- List of foreign W-League (Australia) players
- List of University of California, Los Angeles people
