= Maureen Fitzgerald =

American soccer player

Personal information
- Date of birth: c. 1990 (age 35–36)
- Height: 5 ft 3 in (1.60 m)
- Position: Midfielder

College career
| Years | Team | Apps | (Gls) |
| 2009 | Boise State Broncos | 24 | (3) |
| 2010–2012 | Oregon Ducks | 58 | (2) |

Senior career*
| Years | Team | Apps | (Gls) |
| 2016 | Portland Thorns FC | 3 | (0) |
| 2021 | Portland Thorns FC | 0 | (0) |
- * Club domestic league appearances and goals as of April 10, 2021

Maureen Fitzgerald is an American soccer player who played as a midfielder for Portland Thorns FC of the National Women's Soccer League (NWSL).

== Club career ==
Fitzgerald played for Portland Thorns FC in the 2016 NWSL season. She re-joined the team in 2021 as a National Team Replacement player.

== Personal life ==
Fitzgerald is a middle school teacher in Portland, Oregon.
