= Harold Washington College =

Community college in Chicago, Illinois, US

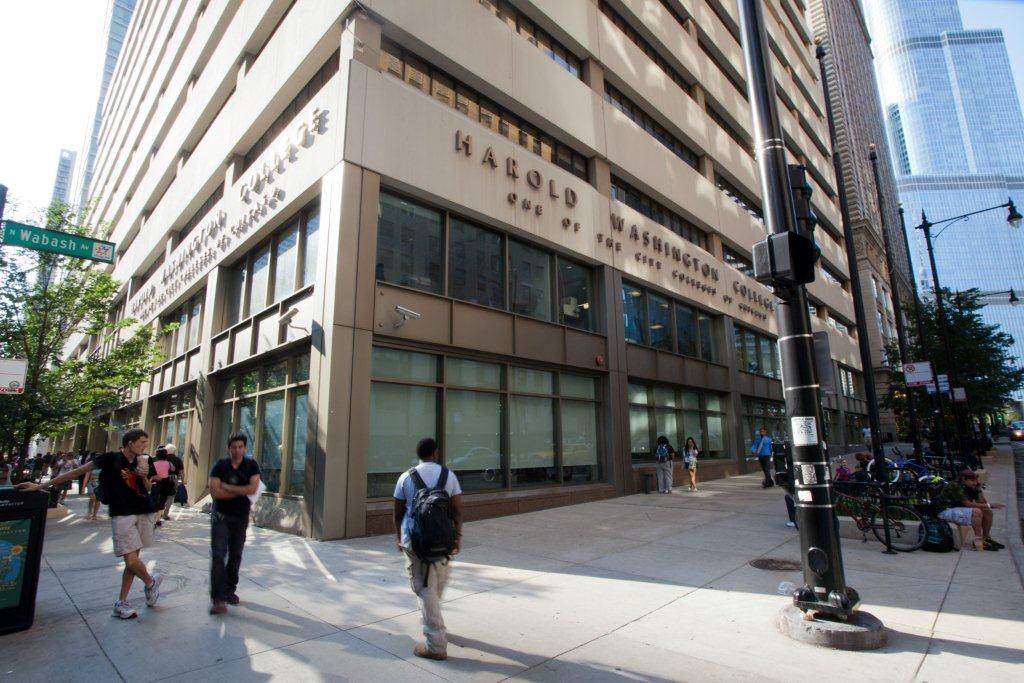
- Former name: Loop College (1962-1987)
- Motto: "Education that Works"
- Type: Community
- Established: 1962; 64 years ago
- Affiliations: City Colleges of Chicago
- Chancellor: Juan Salgado
- President: Daniel López, Jr.
- Students: 8,536
- Location: Chicago, Illinois, United States; 41°53′10″N 87°37′36″W
- Campus: Urban
- Mascot: "The Phoenix"
- Website: ccc.edu/washington

Harold Washington College is a public municipal community college in the Loop community area of Chicago, Illinois, United States. It is part of the City Colleges of Chicago system.

Founded in 1962 as Loop College, the college was renamed for the first African American to be elected Mayor of Chicago, Harold Washington, (1922–1987), after his sudden death in office in November 1987.

== History ==
Harold Washington College was dedicated to Mayor Washington's memory in a ceremony on April 19, 1988, five months after his death. Elements of the City-Wide College were joined to the Harold Washington College when the former was closed in 1993. The Dawson Technical Institute was under the auspices of HWC from 1993 to 1995, at which point it became part of Kennedy-King College, another of the City Colleges of Chicago.

From 1987 to 1993, one of its buildings by the L train (albeit with its sign still reading Loop College) was visible in the opening credits of the ABC sitcom Perfect Strangers.

== Programs ==
HWC as a community college offers two year "Associates" degrees in a wide variety of majors and provides transfer assistance to local four-year upper division colleges and universities. In 2005, it finished a series of substantial renovations with the help of a City bond initiative to be approved by the voters that was the first of its kind in support of a City Colleges institution.

Harold Washington College was the only site in the City of Chicago for taxicab driver certification but now functions as the center of business, entrepreneurship and professional services for all of the City Colleges of Chicago. Harold Washington College is also the Chicago site for the investment/financial firm Goldman Sachs "10,000 Small Businesses" program, which provides Chicago area small business owners with greater access to business education, financial capital and business support services.

In 2004, Harold Washington College established a "Great Books" program. The school also has an agreement with private institution, Shimer College, another "Great Books" curriculum college in Chicago, to allow Harold Washington students to take classes at Shimer while paying City Colleges level of tuition.

Accredited by the Higher Learning Commission of the North Central Association of Colleges and Schools, Harold Washington College is also approved by the Illinois Community College Board, the Illinois Board of Higher Education and the Illinois State Board of Education. In 2013, the Council for Higher Education Accreditation recognized Harold Washington College's assessments of student learning outcomes, which have influenced course sequencing, pre-requisites, teaching strategies, faculty development and institutional policies, with the 2013 CHEA Award for Outstanding Institutional Practice in Student Learning Outcomes.

== Notable alumni ==
- Minnie Riperton, attended Loop College for less than 21 days
- Walid Shoebat
- Darling Squire
- Balki Bartokomous (Fictional character who attends HWC on the sitcom Perfect Strangers)
- Norman Teague – American designer and educator
