= Crystal Dunn =

American soccer player (born 1992)

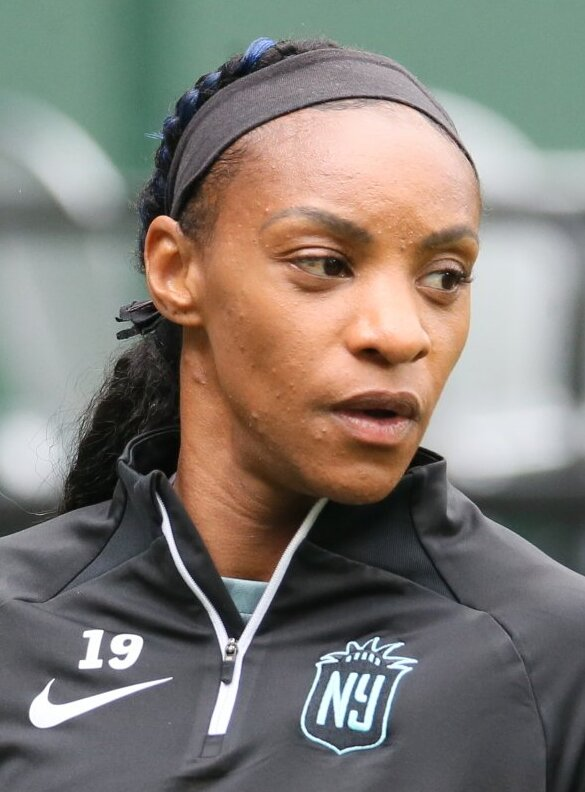
- Dunn with Gotham FC in 2024

Personal information
- Full name: Crystal Alyssia Soubrier
- Birth name: Crystal Alyssia Dunn
- Date of birth: July 3, 1992 (age 34)
- Place of birth: New Hyde Park, New York, U.S.
- Height: 5 ft 1 in (1.55 m)
- Positions: Forward; attacking midfielder; left back; central midfielder

Youth career
- 2006–2009: South Side High School
- 2006–2009: Eastern New York Youth Soccer

College career
Years	Team	Apps	(Gls)
2010–2013	North Carolina Tar Heels	80	(31)

Senior career*
Years	Team	Apps	(Gls)
2014–2016	Washington Spirit	54	(17)
2017–2018	Chelsea	15	(3)
2018–2020	North Carolina Courage	35	(15)
2020–2023	Portland Thorns	34	(7)
2024	Gotham FC	23	(1)
2025–2026	Paris Saint-Germain	6	(2)

International career^{‡}
2008–2009	United States U-17	13	(1)
2009–2010	United States U-18	14	
2010–2012	United States U-20	33	
2013–2025	United States	160	(25)
Medal record
Women's soccer
Representing the United States
CONCACAF W Gold Cup
Winner	2024 United States
Olympic Games
Gold medal – first place	2024 Paris	Team
Bronze medal – third place	2020 Tokyo	Team
FIFA Women's World Cup
Gold medal – first place	2019 France	Team
CONCACAF W Championship
Winner	2018 United States
- * Club domestic league appearances and goals as of September 28, 2025 ‡ National team caps and goals as of May 31, 2025

Crystal Alyssia Soubrier (née Dunn; born July 3, 1992) is an American former professional soccer player. A versatile player, she played primarily as an attacking midfielder or forward for club and left back for country.

Dunn played college soccer for the North Carolina Tar Heels, winning the national championship and the Hermann Trophy in 2012. She was drafted first overall by the Washington Spirit in the 2014 NWSL College Draft. The following year, she won the NWSL Most Valuable Player and the Golden Boot awards, becoming the youngest player to win both awards at age 23. After one year with English club Chelsea, Dunn joined the North Carolina Courage in 2018, winning two consecutive NWSL Shields and NWSL Championships. In 2020, she joined the Portland Thorns and won her third NWSL Shield and NWSL Championship. She ended her career with spells at Gotham FC and Paris Saint-Germain, retiring in 2026.

Dunn won the 2012 FIFA U-20 Women's World Cup before making her senior debut in 2013. She went on to make 160 appearances and score 25 goals for the USWNT. She was part of the team that won the 2019 FIFA Women's World Cup, bronze at the 2020 Tokyo Olympics, and gold at the 2024 Paris Olympics.

== Early life ==
Born in New Hyde Park, New York, to Vincent and Rhonda Dunn, Dunn was raised with her brother Henry in Rockville Centre, New York where she attended South Side High School. At South Side, she was a four-year starter as forward and midfielder and team captain in 2008 and 2009. She lost only two matches in three seasons at South Side and helped lead her team to New York state championships in 2006, 2007 and 2009. In 2008, she was competing at the 2008 FIFA U-17 Women's World Cup in New Zealand. As captain of the team in 2009, she scored four goals in the first 20 minutes of the state championship game.

"As a black woman I always felt growing up I had to do above and beyond stuff to be noticed, to feel like I could hang with everybody else," she says. "I tried to implement so many different things in my game so that I'm not just known for my speed. It's a stereotype that black players are just really fast, but at the end of day I want to be skilled, I want to be technical, I want to have vision and that's what I've always tried to promote in my game: not relying on one thing but just being able to outwork players in so many different ways.

— Crystal Dunn, The Guardian

Dunn scored 46 goals and had 35 assists in three high school seasons, missing the 2008 season due to national team commitments. She was a highly decorated high school player earning Parade All-American and New York Gatorade Player of the Year. She earned First-team All-State and All-Long Island honors in 2006, 2007 and 2009. As a freshman, sophomore and senior, she was an All-New York First Team and All-Long Island team selection. In 2009, she was named 2009 NSCAA, ESPNRise and Parade High School All-America. The teams she played on in 2007 and 2009 went undefeated and were ranked number one in the nation by the NSCAA.

As a senior, she was named Newsday Long Island Player of the Year, Nassau County Class A Player of the Year, New York Sportswriters Class A Player of the Year, BigAppleSoccer.com Youth Player of the Year and was the winner of the Mike Clark Award for the best all-around athlete in Nassau County. In addition to her high school experience, Dunn played with the club teams, Albertson Fury, the RVC Tornadoes, and the RVC Power (with whom she won a state title).

=== University of North Carolina, 2010–2013 ===
Dunn attended the University of North Carolina, Chapel Hill and majored in sociology. As a freshman in 2010, Dunn started 23 matches for a total of 1,929 minutes, playing the full 90 minutes 18 times. She was the team's leading player in points (26), including nine goals and eight assists. She scored four goals during the NCAA Division I Women's Soccer Championship, including a match-winner against Jackson State, a goal against Notre Dame, and two goals in a 3–1 win over James Madison in the second round of the tournament. Her accolades during her first year season included Soccer America Freshman of the Year, 2010 NSCAA first-team All-America honoree, Second-team Soccer America MVP selection, and First-team All-ACC. She was the first freshman ever to win the ACC Defensive Player of the Year award and was a semi-finalist for the 2010 Missouri Athletic Club Hermann Trophy.

As a sophomore in 2011, Dunn started in 19 matches, missing only one while she was training with the United States under-20 women's national soccer team. She scored three goals and made six assists during the season. She was named third-team All-America and first-team All-Southeast Region by the NSCAA. She was also named to the first-team All-ACC and was named to the Top Drawer Soccer National Team of the Week three times.

During her junior season in 2012, Dunn missed the non-conference phase of the 2012 college season while playing for the United States under-20 women's national soccer team at the 2012 FIFA U-20 Women's World Cup in Japan. Following her return, she helped lead the Tar Heels to win the NCAA Women's Soccer Championship. During the tournament's quarter-final, Dunn scored both goals in a 2–1 win against top-seed team BYU, including a match-winning "golden" goal within four minutes of the end of the second overtime. She also saved her team from losing to BYU when she headed the ball away from the Tar Heels' goal line in the first overtime. Dunn was named the 2013 Hermann Trophy winner as well as the ACC Athlete of the Year and ACC Defender of the Year. Dunn was an All-ACC selection for the third straight year and an ESPY Awards finalist. She also was awarded the 2012 Honda Award for Soccer.

During her senior-year season in 2013, Dunn scored the first hat-trick of her collegiate career, ending a two-match losing streak for the Tar Heels by defeating the Miami Hurricanes 4–0. She was the team's top scorer with 14 goals, including six match-winning goals. Dunn was named ACC Offensive Player of the Year, NSCAA All-American and First-team All-ACC for the fourth consecutive year. She was a Hermann Trophy finalist and a Honda Award nominee.

== Club career ==
=== Washington Spirit, 2014–2017 ===
In January 2014, the Washington Spirit selected Dunn with the first overall pick in the 2014 College Draft for the 2014 season of the National Women's Soccer League. She made 19 starts in her 22 appearances for the Spirit during the 2014 season. The team finished fourth during the regular season with a 10–9–5 record securing a place in the playoffs. During the semi-final, the Spirit were defeated by regular season champions Seattle Reign FC 2–1 on August 31 in Seattle. Dunn came third in voting for NWSL Rookie of the Year.

Dunn returned to the Spirit for the 2015 season. On April 26, 2015, she scored two goals as a defender in a match against Sky Blue FC, helping the Spirit win 3–1. She was subsequently named NWSL Player of the Week for week 2 of the season. On August 1, 2015, Dunn scored the franchise's first hat trick, scoring three goals in the first half of the Spirit's victory over the visiting Houston Dash. She finished the month with six goals, earning her the league Player of the Month award. Dunn finished the regular season with a league-leading 15 goals, giving her the 2015 NWSL Golden Boot, and won the league Most Valuable Player award. She became the youngest player to win both awards at age 23 and broke the league record with her 0.77 goals-per-game average. She has said that being left off the national team for the 2015 FIFA Women's World Cup gave her extra motivation in the league.

Dunn returned for her third season in 2016, scoring four goals and notching a career-high five assists. Two of her four goals were the two Spirit goals scored in the team's first-ever appearance in the NWSL Championship, which was won on penalties by the Western New York Flash after a 2–2 draw.

=== Chelsea, 2017–2018 ===
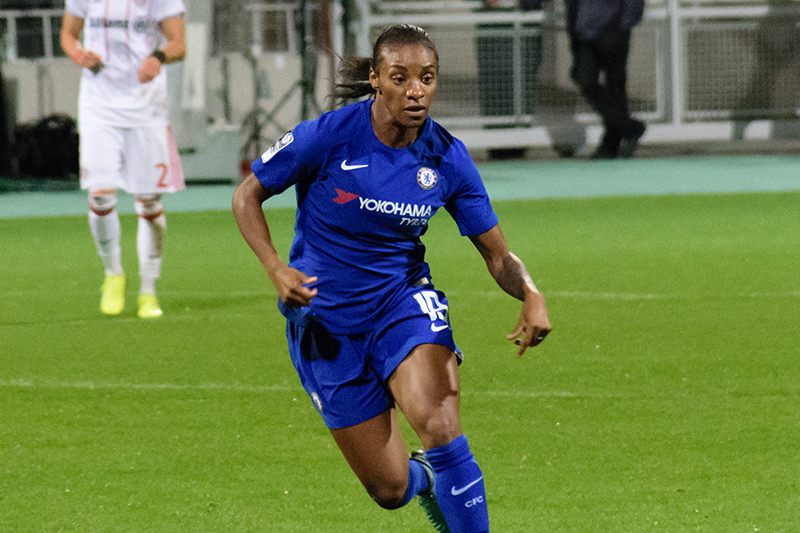
Dunn playing for Chelsea in October 2017.

On January 3, 2017, Dunn joined FA WSL 1 club Chelsea. On March 19, she scored her first goal just 12 minutes into her first competitive appearance for the club, in a 7–0 FA Cup win over Doncaster Rovers Belles. She made her first appearance in the FA WSL in April, scoring her first league goal in a 6–0 victory over Yeovil Town. At the beginning she played as a striker for Chelsea, but switched to the wing-back position. During her time at Chelsea, Dunn scored five goals in 20 appearances in all competitions and helped Chelsea win the FA WSL Spring Series. She also helped the club reach the quarter-finals in the 2017–18 UEFA Women's Champions League, marking the first time they reached that stage of the competition. Dunn enjoyed her time at Chelsea, and even named one of her adopted chickens after the club, but made the decision to return to the United States so that the national team staff could see her play more.

=== North Carolina Courage, 2018–2020 ===
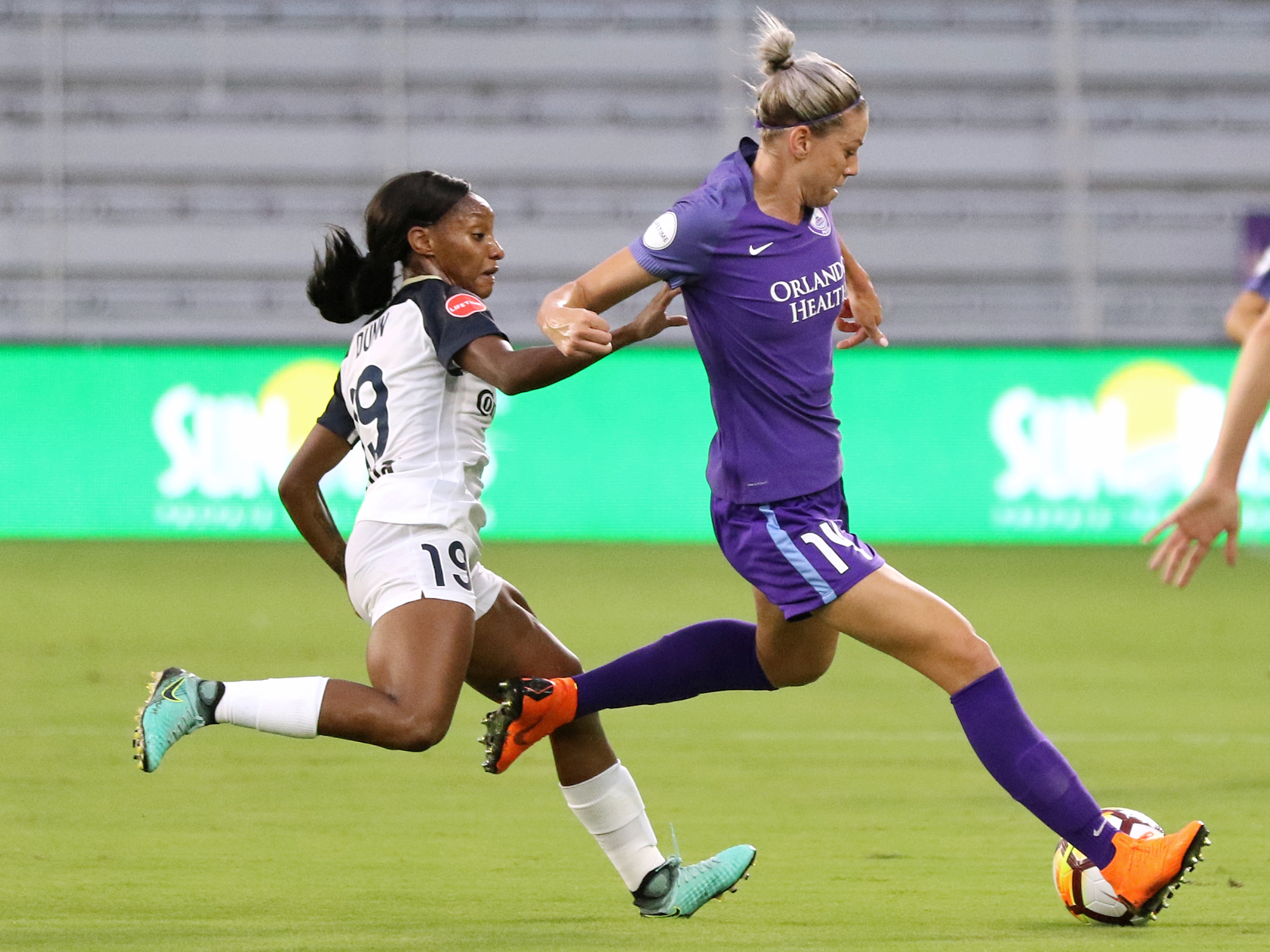
Dunn playing for North Carolina Courage against Orlando Pride in May 2018.

After a year in England, it was planned that Dunn would return to North America with the deal of a trade with Washington Spirit for two of North Carolina Courage's players at the time, Taylor Smith and Ashley Hatch. The Spirit retained the League rights after Chelsea signed Dunn back in January 2017. This move was confirmed by Chelsea on February 25, 2018.

She made her first appearance for the North Carolina Courage in a 1–0 win over Portland Thorns FC, in the opening game of the 2018 NWSL season. Dunn was named Player of the Week twice in the 2018 NWSL season, for weeks 8 and 13. She was named Player of the Month for the month of June. Dunn appeared in 22 regular season games for the Courage, scoring eight goals, helping North Carolina win the NWSL Shield. The Courage broke multiple season records including most goals scored, most wins, and most points. Dunn was named to the 2018 NWSL Best XI. Dunn was in the starting lineup for the semi-final game against the Chicago Red Stars, in which North Carolina won 2–0 and advanced to the Championship Game. She was in the starting lineup for the final, which North Carolina won 3–0 over the Portland Thorns.

=== Portland Thorns, 2020–2023 ===
On October 22, 2020, Crystal Dunn was traded to OL Reign in exchange for Casey Murphy and $140,000 in NWSL allocation money. Later that day, she was traded to the Portland Thorns FC in exchange for an international roster slot, a first-round pick in the 2022 NWSL Draft, and $250,000 in allocation money. With the rescheduled 2020 Summer Olympics occurring during the middle of the 2021 NWSL season, Dunn was away from the club for much of July and August. She played in 15 matches for the club during the remainder of the season, helping the Thorns to an NWSL Shield, the third of her career.

Shortly following the end of the 2021 season, Dunn announced her first pregnancy. After missing the majority of the 2022 NWSL season, Dunn returned to the field less than four months after the birth of her first child, Marcel, subbing on during 0–2 win against the Orlando Pride on September 9, 2022. Dunn's first goal for the Thorns following her pregnancy would prove to a be a crucial one: a game-winning goal in the 93rd minute of their semifinal match against the San Diego Wave. Dunn would sub on late in the final, making her fourth career appearance in an NWSL Championship match, and lift the trophy with the Thorns.

Dunn played 19 matches for the Thorns during the 2023 season, during which she scored five goals and two assists. Following the 2023 season, Dunn became a free agent and announced she would not return to the Thorns, later saying that she felt undervalued by the club.

=== NJ/NY Gotham FC, 2024 ===
During the 2023 offseason, Dunn was linked to a number of clubs including the Orlando Pride, the Washington Spirit, and Gotham FC with reports that the Pride had offered her a salary of $400,000 a year. On December 31, 2023, Gotham FC announced that Dunn, a Long Island native with family in the New York metropolitan area, had signed with the club through 2026.

=== Paris Saint-Germain, 2025–2026 ===
On January 31, 2025, she joined Paris Saint-Germain. Dunn scored a brace against Saint Etienne during the 2024–2025 season in a 6–0 victory.

On January 29, 2026, Dunn announced her retirement from professional soccer.

== International career ==
=== Youth national teams ===
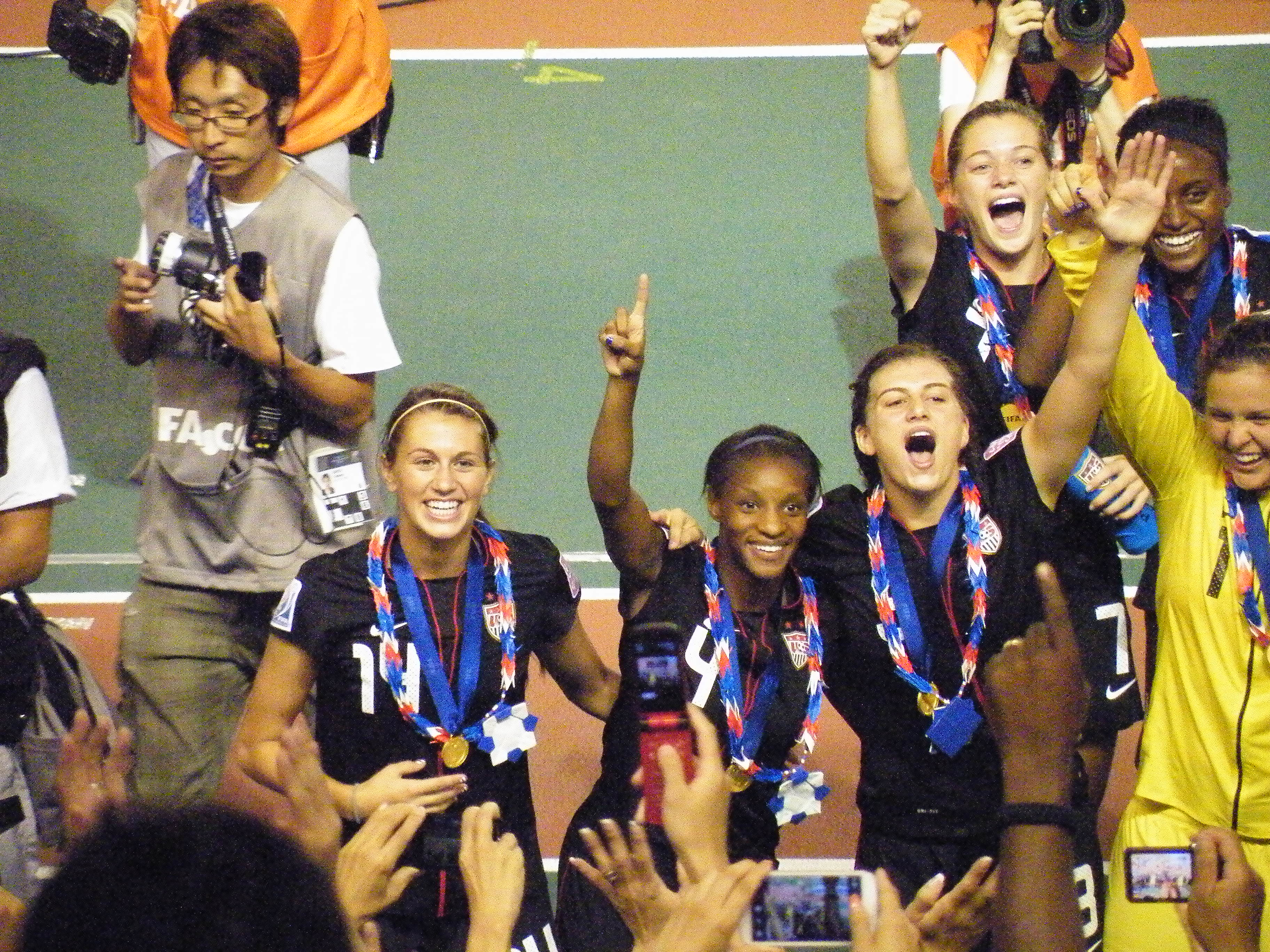
Dunn celebrates with her teammates during the 2012 FIFA U-20 Women's World Cup awards ceremony in Japan.

Dunn has competed on behalf of the United States in various national youth teams from 2008 through 2012, including at the 2008 FIFA U-17 Women's World Cup. She played in 14 international matches for the U-20 national team in 2010 before playing in every minute of the U.S.' five matches at the 2012 FIFA U-20 Women's World Cup, in which they won. She competed at the 2010 FIFA U-20 Women's World Cup in Germany and was a member of the team that won the 2012 FIFA U-20 Women's World Cup in Japan.

=== Senior national team ===
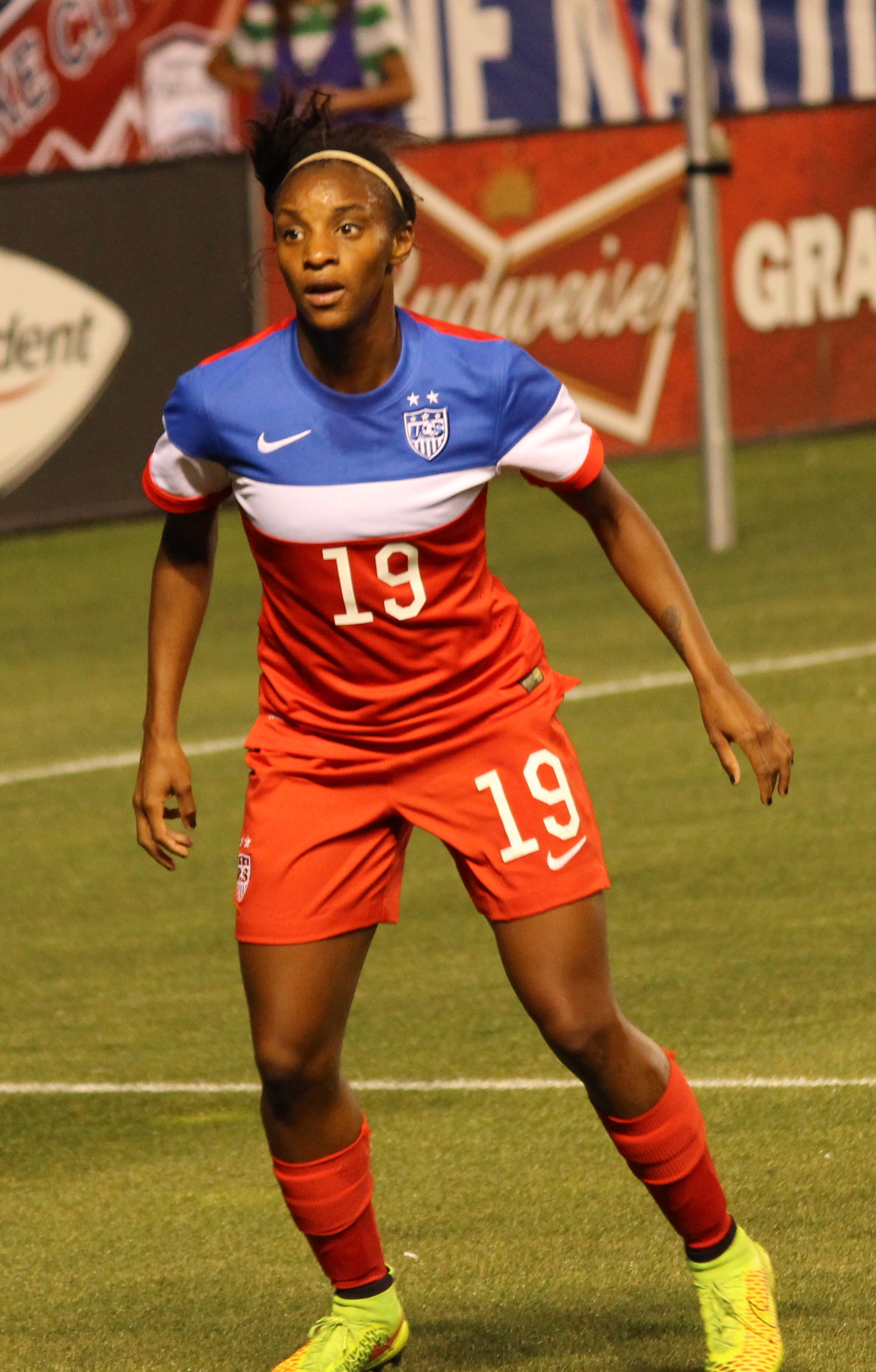
Dunn competing in a friendly against Mexico in September 2014.

On January 22, 2013, Dunn received her first call-up to the senior team's training camp, by the newly appointed coach Tom Sermanni. Dunn made her debut for the team, on February 13, against Scotland in a friendly match; and was placed on the roster for 2013 Algarve Cup.

Dunn made her first Algarve Cup appearance for the senior team during the team's first match in the tournament on March 6, 2013, against Iceland. She started the match at left back and played for the full 90 minutes. The United States defeated Iceland 3–0. Dunn earned her third cap with the senior team during the final match of the tournament against Germany. The United States clinched the tournament championship after defeating Germany 2–0.

In October 2014, Dunn was dropped from the national team roster ahead of the 2014 CONCACAF Women's Championship, which served as the qualifying tournament for the 2015 FIFA Women's World Cup. Dunn returned from injury in December 2014 and traveled with the team to Brazil, but did not play.

Dunn was named to the roster for February 2015 friendlies against France and England, and made a substitute appearance against England. February 2015, Dunn was named to the 2015 Algarve Cup roster, but did not play during the tournament. Dunn was named to the preliminary roster for the 2015 FIFA Women's World Cup, but surprisingly did not make the final squad of 23.

In September 2015, Dunn was added to the roster for the national team's Women's World Cup victory tour prior to the September 17 match against Haiti, becoming the first player not on the World Cup roster to join the tour. She made her first start of 2015 against Haiti and earned her first cap since the England friendly. She recorded her first career national team assists, both on Carli Lloyd's goals, and scored her first national team goal in the final moments of the match.

Dunn played in the national team's opening game of the 2016 CONCACAF Women's Olympic Qualifying Championship, scoring her fifth international goal in the 5–0 victory over Costa Rica. In the third group match vs Puerto Rico, Dunn was tied for the most goals scored by a U.S. player, netting five goals and one assist.

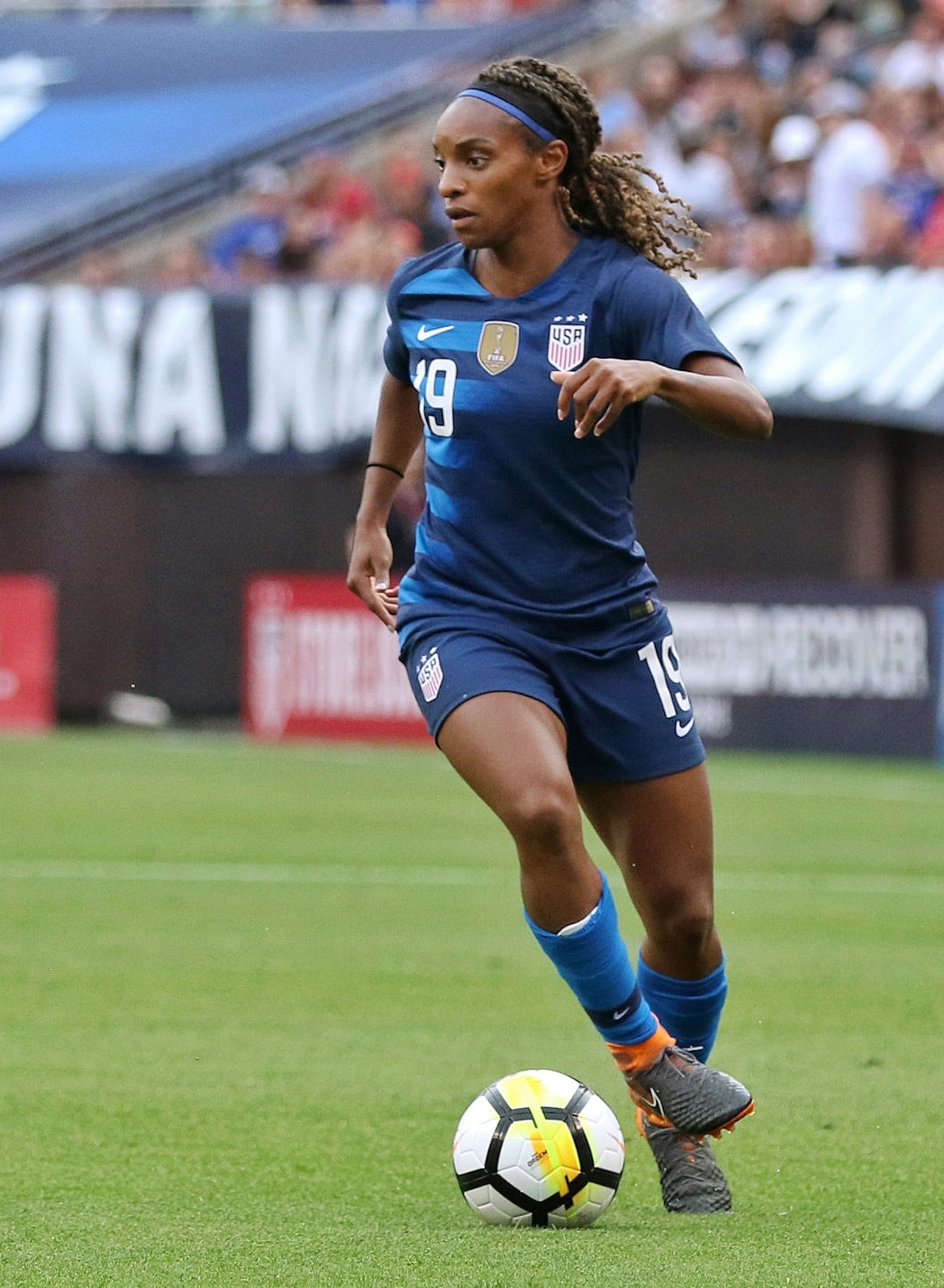
Dunn with the USWNT in 2018

During their first match of March 2019, each national team player wore a jersey with the name of a woman they were honoring on the back; Dunn chose the name of Serena Williams.

On February 7, 2020, Dunn played her 100th match for the United States in a 4–0 win against Mexico. Dunn was the only American player to start in all six matches at the 2020 Summer Olympics in Japan and played all but 16 minutes at the tournament helping the team win bronze.

Dunn was named to the 18-player roster for the 2024 Summer Olympics in France. In the first knockout round against Japan, she sent a long ball to assist Trinity Rodman for a 1–0 win in extra time, sending the team to the semifinals. She started in the gold medal game against Brazil, which the United States won 1–0 on a goal from Mallory Swanson.

== Style of play and position ==
Dunn is known for her creative problem solving in attack, her work rate, and above all, her positional versatility. After beginning her professional career as a forward for the Washington Spirit and the United States, Emma Hayes deployed her as a wingback during her time at Chelsea. Upon her return to the United States, she played as one of two attacking midfielders alongside Debinha for the North Carolina Courage. While playing for the Courage, Dunn also established herself as one of the world's best left backs, solidifying her as starter at that position for the United States during the 2019 Women's World Cup. Dunn has expressed that she prefers to play an attacking role.

== In popular culture ==
Dunn has been featured in Self Magazine. In 2016, she starred with teammates Hope Solo and Megan Rapinoe in a docu-series called Keeping Score broadcast by Fullscreen. The episodes follow the athletes as they prepare for the 2016 Summer Olympics and address issues such as equal pay and racism. In 2018, Dunn posed nude for ESPN’s The Body Issue magazine.

== Personal life ==
Dunn married Pierre Soubrier in December 2018. They met when she was playing for the NWSL's Washington Spirit, where he was working as an athletic trainer. Soubrier's presence in Portland, where he was head trainer for the Portland Thorns, contributed to Dunn's desire to get traded to Portland. Together, they have five chickens (Quinn, Juke, Chelsea, Toulouse, and Rocky), as well as three cats.

On November 11, 2021, Dunn announced that she and Soubrier were expecting their first child together; their son was born following an unplanned C-section on May 20, 2022.

== Career statistics ==
=== Club ===
As of September 27, 2025

Club	Season	League							Continental (Note: Includes UEFA Women's Champions League)		Total		Ref.
Club	Season	Division	Regular season		Play-offs		Cup (Note: Includes FA Women's Super League Cup, 2020 NWSL Challenge Cup, 2021 NWSL Challenge Cup, and 2024 NWSL Challenge Cup.)		Continental		Total		Ref.
Club	Season	Division	Apps	Goals	Apps	Goals	Apps	Goals	Apps	Goals	Apps	Goals	Ref.
Washington Spirit	2014	NWSL	21	0	—		—				21	0	
Washington Spirit	2015	NWSL	20	15	—		—				20	15	
Washington Spirit	2016	NWSL	13	2	—		—				13	2	
Washington Spirit	Total		54	17	0	0	—				54	17	—
Chelsea FC	2017	FA WSL	8	1	—		—		—		8	1	
Chelsea FC	2017–2018	FA WSL	7	2	—		5	2	4	0	16	4	
Chelsea FC	Total		15	3	—		5	2	4	0	24	5	—
North Carolina Courage	2018	NWSL	22	8	2	0	—				24	8	
North Carolina Courage	2019	NWSL	13	7	2	2	—				15	9	
North Carolina Courage	2020	NWSL	— (Note: 2020 regular season and playoffs cancelled due COVID-19 pandemic)				5	1	—		5	1	
North Carolina Courage	Total		35	15	4	2	5	1	—		44	18	—
Portland Thorns FC	2021	NWSL	14	1	–	–	3	0	—		14	1	
Portland Thorns FC	2022	NWSL	4	0	2	1	—		—		6	1	
Portland Thorns FC	2023	NWSL	19	5	1	0	—		—		20	5	
Portland Thorns FC	Total		37	6	3	1	3	0	—		40	7	—
NJ/ NY Gotham FC	2024	NWSL	23	1	0	0	1	0	—		23	1	
Paris Saint-Germain FC	2025	Première Ligue	5	2	0	0	0	0	0	0	5	2	
Career total			141	44	4	2	14	3	4	0	190	50	—

=== International ===
As of match played May 31, 2025

National team	Year	Apps	Goals
United States
United States	2013	8	0
United States	2014	4	0
United States	2015	8	4
United States	2016	25	14
United States	2017	12	4
United States	2018	18	2
United States	2019	21	0
United States	2020	9	0
United States	2021	18	0
United States	2022	3	0
United States	2023	14	0
United States	2024	15	1
United States	2025	5	0
Total		160	25

Scores and results list United States's goal tally first, score column indicates score after each Dunn goal.

List of international goals scored by Crystal Dunn
No.	Date	Venue	Opponent	Score	Result	Competition	Ref.
1	September 17, 2015	Detroit, Michigan	Haiti	5–0	5–0	Friendly	
2	September 20, 2015	Birmingham, Alabama	Haiti	3–0	8–0	Friendly	
3	October 25, 2015	Orlando, Florida	Brazil	2–1	3–1	Friendly	
4	December 13, 2015	Glendale, Arizona	China	1–0	2–0	Friendly	
5	February 10, 2016	Frisco, Texas	Costa Rica	3–0	5–0	2016 CONCACAF Olympic Qualifying	
6	February 15, 2016	Frisco, Texas	Puerto Rico	1–0	10–0	2016 CONCACAF Olympic Qualifying	
7	February 15, 2016	Frisco, Texas	Puerto Rico	3–0	10–0	2016 CONCACAF Olympic Qualifying	
8	February 15, 2016	Frisco, Texas	Puerto Rico	6–0	10–0	2016 CONCACAF Olympic Qualifying	
9	February 15, 2016	Frisco, Texas	Puerto Rico	8–0	10–0	2016 CONCACAF Olympic Qualifying	
10	February 15, 2016	Frisco, Texas	Puerto Rico	9–0	10–0	2016 CONCACAF Olympic Qualifying	
11	March 3, 2016	Tampa, Florida	England	1–0	1–0	2016 SheBelieves Cup	
12	April 6, 2016	East Hartford, Connecticut	Colombia	1–0	7–0	Friendly	
13	July 9, 2016	Chicago, Illinois	South Africa	1–0	1–0	Friendly	
14	July 23, 2016	Kansas City, Kansas	Costa Rica	1–0	4–0	Friendly	
15	August 9, 2016	Manaus, Brazil	Colombia	1–1	2–2	2016 Summer Olympics	
16	September 15, 2016	Columbus, Ohio	Thailand	6–0	9–0	Friendly	
17	October 23, 2016	Minneapolis, Minnesota	Switzerland	4–1	5–1	Friendly	
18	November 13, 2016	Carson, California	Romania	2–0	5–0	Friendly	
19	April 6, 2017	Frisco, Texas	Russia	1–0	4–0	Friendly	
20	April 6, 2017	Frisco, Texas	Russia	3–0	4–0	Friendly	
21	April 9, 2017	Houston, Texas	Russia	3–0	5–1	Friendly	
22	April 9, 2017	Houston, Texas	Russia	5–1	5–1	Friendly	
23	January 21, 2018	San Diego, California	Denmark	5–1	5–1	Friendly	
24	October 10, 2018	Cary, North Carolina	Trinidad and Tobago	4–0	7–0	2018 CONCACAF Championship	
25	June 4, 2024	St. Paul, Minnesota	South Korea	1–0	3–0	Friendly	

== Honors ==
University of North Carolina

- NCAA Women's Soccer Championship: 2012

Chelsea

- FA WSL Spring Series: 2017

North Carolina Courage

- NWSL Championship: 2018, 2019
- NWSL Shield: 2018, 2019

Portland Thorns

- NWSL Challenge Cup: 2021
- International Champions Cup: 2021
- NWSL Shield: 2021
- NWSL Championship: 2022

United States U20

- FIFA U-20 Women's World Cup: 2012
- CONCACAF Women's U-20 Championship: 2012

United States

- FIFA Women's World Cup: 2019
- Summer Olympic Games Gold Medal: 2024
- Summer Olympic Games Bronze Medal: 2020
- CONCACAF Women's Championship: 2018
- CONCACAF W Gold Cup: 2024
- CONCACAF Women's Olympic Qualifying Tournament: 2016; 2020
- SheBelieves Cup: 2016; 2018; 2020, 2021; 2023,2024
- Tournament of Nations: 2018
- Algarve Cup: 2015

Individual

- Hermann Trophy: 2012
- Honda Sports Award 2012–13
- ACC Player of the Year: 2012
- ACC Defensive Player of the Year: 2010
- ACC Offensive Player of the Year: 2013
- Soccer America Player of the Year Award: 2012
- Honda Sports Award: 2012
- NWSL Player of the Week: 2015 (Weeks 3, 8, 11, 16, 18, 20), 2018 (weeks 8, 13), 2021 (week 6)
- NWSL Player of the Month: August 2015, June 2018
- NWSL Most Valuable Player: 2015
- NWSL Best XI: 2015, 2018
- NWSL Second XI: 2016, 2019
- NWSL Golden Boot: 2015 (15 goals)
- CONCACAF Women's Olympic Qualifying Tournament Golden Boot: 2016 (6 goals)
- IFFHS Women's World Team: 2019
- CONCACAF Women's Championship Best XI: 2018
- CONCACAF Women's Olympic Qualifying Tournament Best XI: 2020
- CONCACAF Player of the Year: 2021
- FIFA U-20 Women's World Cup All-star team: 2010

== See also ==
- List of most expensive association football transfers
- NWSL federation players
- List of United States women's national soccer team hat-tricks
- List of American and Canadian soccer champions
- List of foreign FA Women's Super League players
- List of University of North Carolina at Chapel Hill Olympians
- List of University of North Carolina at Chapel Hill alumni
