= Richard J. Daley College =

Public two-year college in Chicago, Illinois, US

Coordinates: 41°45′21.4″N 87°43′26.4″W

- Former name: William J. Bogan Junior College (1960–1977)
- Motto: "Education that Works"
- Type: Community
- Established: 1960; 66 years ago
- Affiliations: City Colleges of Chicago
- Chancellor: Juan Salgado
- President: Isaac Zúñiga
- Students: 8,250
- Location: Chicago, Illinois, U.S.
- Campus: Large City
- Nickname: Bulldogs
- Website: ccc.edu/daley

Richard J. Daley College is a public municipal community college in the West Lawn community area in the southwestern side of Chicago, Illinois, United States. It is part of the City Colleges of Chicago system.

The college was founded as William J. Bogan Junior College in 1960 and utilized classrooms in the evenings provided by William J. Bogan High School in the Ashburn neighborhood on the southwest side of Chicago, Illinois, United States. In 1970, the college moved to an interim campus, made of prefab buildings, in the West Lawn neighborhood at 7500 S. Pulaski Road, until the present campus was completed in 1981.

In 1976, a week after the death of Richard J. Daley, the college was renamed in honor of the late mayor.

== Campuses ==
=== Daley College ===
Main building at Richard J. Daley College

Located at 7500 S. Pulaski, it is the school's main campus. The north side houses the adult education and technical education buildings as well as the faculty and staff parking lot. This side is adjacent to a U.S. Army Reserve Training center. Located on the east side of campus (running parallel to Pulaski Rd.) is the tennis court. The south end is the student and visitor parking lot, which connects to the main building via an enclosed overpass. The overpass includes an elevator for handicapped access. The main building, located centrally, is where the majority of classroom instruction and activities are held. Plans are underway for a new Advanced Manufacturing Center to be located on the south campus, which will support the college's enhanced program in manufacturing training and certifications.

=== Arturo Velasquez Institute ===
Located at 2800 S. Western, it is Richard J. Daley College's sister school. Opened in 1995, it is primarily a technical school offering the relevant degrees and certifications.

== Organization and Administration ==
A public institution, Daley is one of the seven City Colleges of Chicago (CCC), and is regulated by Board of Trustees of the City Colleges of Chicago. Each school's president is selected by CCC's chancellor and approved by this board. The current president of Daley is Dr. Isaac Zúñiga.

== College to Careers focus ==
Daley College is City Colleges of Chicago's College to Careers hub for Advanced Manufacturing.
