= Amanda DaCosta =

Portuguese footballer (born 1989)

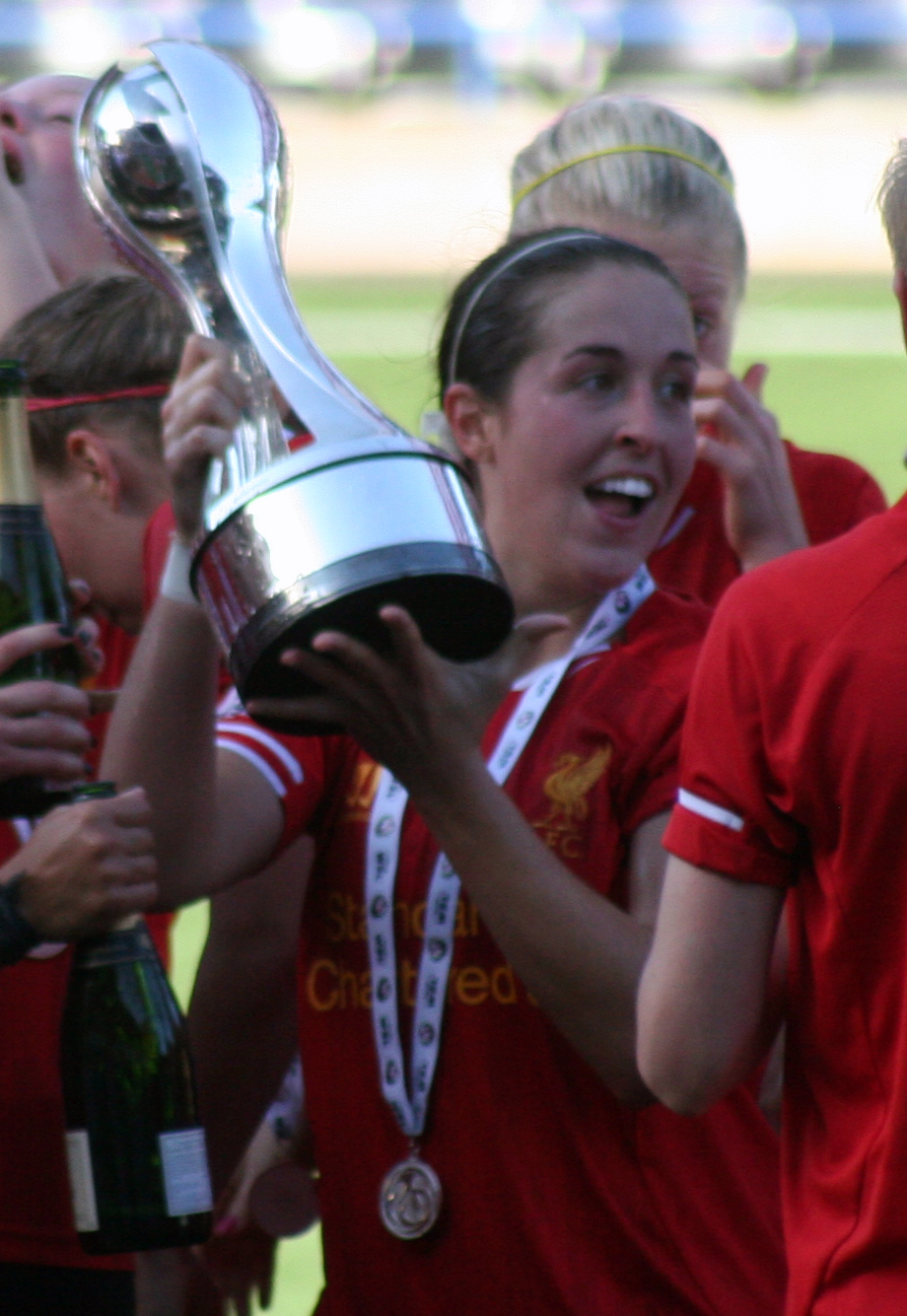

Personal information
- Full name: Amanda Jaqueline Paswall
- Birth name: Amanda Jaqueline DaCosta
- Date of birth: 7 October 1989 (age 37)
- Place of birth: Katonah, New York, United States
- Height: 1.63 m (5 ft 4 in)
- Position: Midfielder

College career
| Years | Team | Apps | (Gls) |
| 2007–2010 | Florida State Seminoles | 96 | (17) |

Senior career*
| Years | Team | Apps | (Gls) |
| 2011 | Washington Freedom | | |
| 2011 | MagicJack | | |
| 2012 | Boston Breakers | | |
| 2012–2014 | Liverpool Ladies | 40 | (3) |
| 2015 | Washington Spirit | 17 | (3) |
| 2016 | Chicago Red Stars | 14 | (0) |
| 2017 | Boston Breakers | 11 | (1) |

International career
| 2006 | United States U17 | | |
| 2008 | United States U20 | | |
| 2009–2012 | United States U23 | | |
| 2015–2017 | Portugal | 19 | (0) |
- * Club domestic league appearances and goals

Amanda Jaqueline Paswall (née DaCosta; born 7 October 1989) is an American-born Portuguese former professional footballer who played as a midfielder for Washington Spirit, Chicago Red Stars and Boston Breakers in the National Women's Soccer League (NWSL), Liverpool Ladies in England's FA WSL, the Washington Freedom and MagicJack in the Women's Professional Soccer (WPS) and for the Portuguese national team. DaCosta was recently inducted in the Florida State Athletics Hall of Fame for her outstanding college career (3x All-American, 4x All-ACC, NCAA Freshman of the year, and National Finalist).

== Early life ==
DaCosta is a native of Somers, New York and attended Somers High School where she was five-year varsity soccer athlete. She earned all-section and all-league honors four times and was named league MVP twice. From 2000 to 2005, she played five years for both the ENY North ODP team as well as the Region 1 ODP team.

=== Florida State University ===
DaCosta was a four-year starter for Florida State Seminoles. During her tenure with the Seminoles, she served as the team captain in 2010 and led the team to a 16–6–1 mark and a sixth consecutive appearance in the NCAA Tournament quarterfinals. She scored a total of 17 goals. She shared the FSU school record for career game-winning assists (10), ranked third in career assists (24) and is ranked fourth in career games started (94).

DaCosta was a First-Team All-ACC selection and NSCAA All-Southeast Region team in 2010. She was named to the NSCAA All-Southeast Region Second Team in 2009 and NSCAA and Soccer Buzz First Team All-American in 2008. In 2010, DaCosta was named as a First Team All-ACC member, making her the first athlete in school history to garner all-ACC accolades all four years of her career.

DaCosta was inducted into the FSU Athletics Hall of Fame in 2022.

== Playing career ==
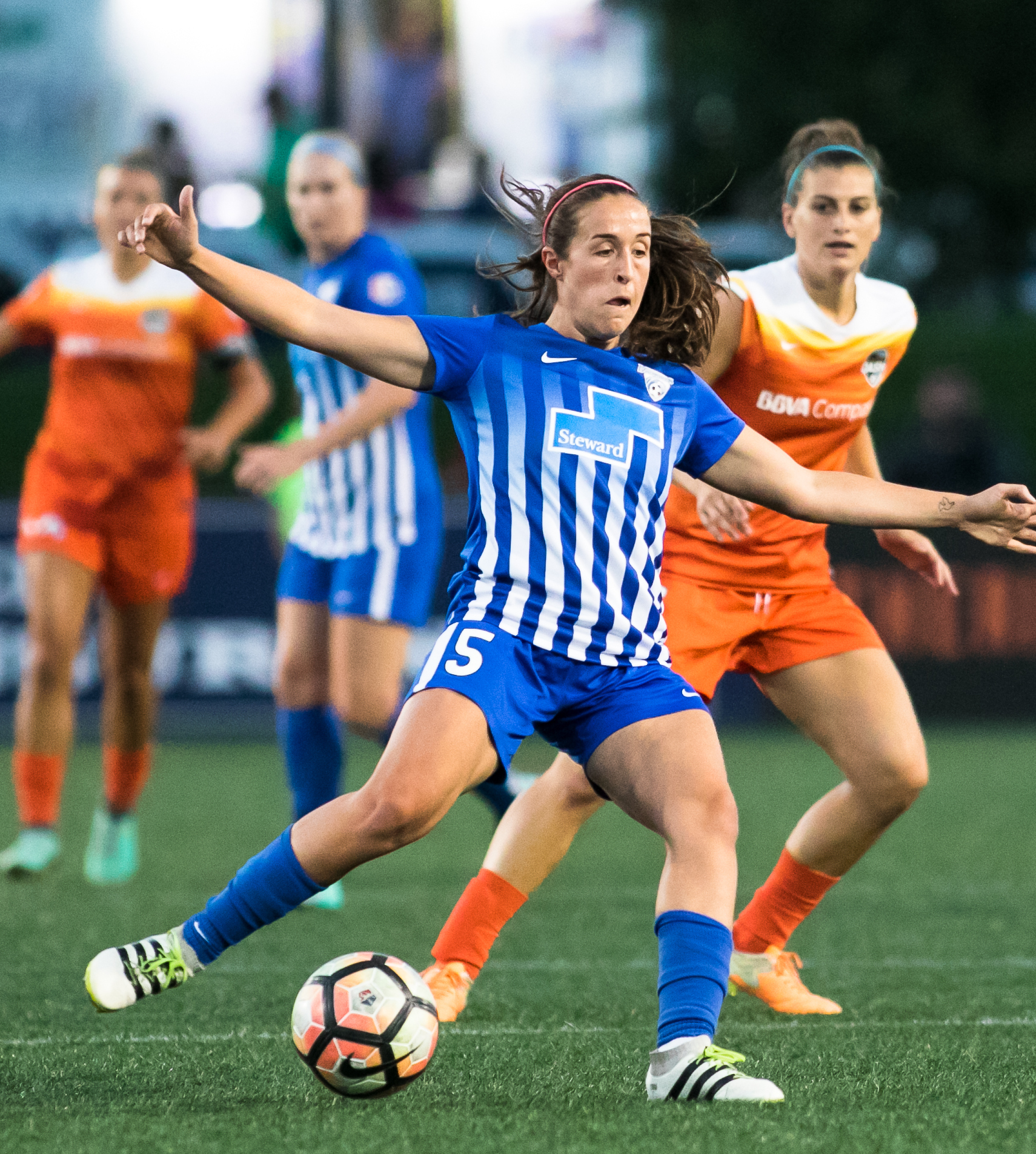
Amanda DaCosta playing for the Boston Breakers in the 2017 NWSL season

=== Club ===
==== Washington Freedom / magicJack, 2011 ====
In 2011, DaCosta was drafted to the Washington Freedom in the Women's Professional Soccer league. The team later became MagicJack after a change in ownership and move to Florida.

In December 2011, she was signed to Sky Blue FC, however the WPS league folded before the 2012 season began.

==== Boston Breakers, 2012 ====
In 2012, DaCosta joined the Boston Breakers in the Women's Premier Soccer League Elite.

==== Liverpool LFC, 2013–2014 ====
In late 2012, DaCosta signed with Liverpool L.F.C. for the 2013 FA WSL season. (Liverpool Ladies had not, as yet, made an official announcement of DaCosta's signing, however DaCosta announced the move on her Twitter page, and subsequently played in Liverpool's first preseason match against Manchester City Ladies). She scored her first goal for Liverpool Ladies against Arsenal Ladies at Emirates Stadium in the FA Women's Super League on 37 minutes on May 7, 2013.

==== National Women's Soccer League, 2015–2017 ====
In 2015 DaCosta played for Washington Spirit in National Women's Soccer League, helping the team reach the playoffs' semifinal where it lost to Seattle Reign FC. On January 25, 2016 Chicago Red Stars announced the acquisition of DaCosta from Washington Spirit along with a fourth round pick in 2017 NWSL College Draft in exchange for an unnamed player.

On November 3, 2016, it was announced that DaCosta was traded from Chicago to the Boston Breakers. On August 8, 2017, DaCosta announced her retirement from professional soccer.

=== International ===
In 2006, DaCosta was a member of the under-17 national team. In March 2008, she competed with the under-20 team at the 2008 Cyprus Cup. She played a key role in helping the U.S. advance to the championship final against the full Canadian National team.

DaCosta was invited to participate in training camp with the U.S. U-23 Women's National Team in Cleveland, Ohio in 2009 ( June 12–19) and twice in 2010 in Carson, California ( January 13–20) and Sunrise, Florida. ( March 7–14). In 2012, she was an active member of the U.S U-23 squad, and ended her campaign netting the game winner for the U.S to beat Norway in the 3-Nations Tournament (Stjordalen, Norway).

On December 1, 2015, she made her first appearance for the Portugal women's national football team, in a Euro 2017 qualifier against Spain. DaCosta subbed on in the 46th minute. She represented Portugal at the final tournament in the Netherlands. DaCosta won a total of 19 caps for Portugal.

== Coaching career ==
In August 2012, DaCosta announced that she would be coaching with Tallahassee United Futbol Club (TUFC) and Cornerstone Middle School as well as for Florida State University in an outreach skills program dubbed Project 4.0.

== Broadcasting career ==
In 2012, DaCosta did the color commentary for the Seminoles soccer team on ESPN3.

== Honors ==
Liverpool

- WSL Women's Super League (2): 2013; 2014

Individual

- FSU Athletics Hall of Fame: Inducted in 2022

== See also ==
- Foreign players in the FA WSL
