= City Colleges of Chicago =

Public community college system

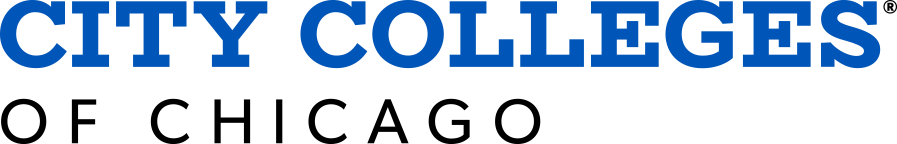
- Other name: Community College District 508
- Type: Public community college system
- Established: 1911; 115 years ago
- Chancellor: Juan Salgado
- Location: Chicago, Illinois, U.S.
- Campus: Urban
- Website: ccc.edu

The City Colleges of Chicago is the public municipal community college system of Chicago, Illinois, United States. The system, through its subordinate colleges, offers associate degrees, certificates, free courses for the GED, and free English as a second language (ESL) courses.

The system has its administrative offices in the Loop of Chicago. It is led by a Board-appointed Chancellor and governed by a seven-member Board of Trustees, whose members are appointed by the Mayor of Chicago and approved by the Chicago City Council.

As of 2021, the system had a yearly count of nearly 70,000 students and more than 4,000 faculty and staff members. Juan Salgado has been the chancellor of the City Colleges system since 2017.

== Locations ==
The system operates seven colleges across the city of Chicago. The seven colleges and their community areas are respectively:

- Harold Washington College, the Loop
- Harry S Truman College, Uptown (North Side)
- Kennedy–King College, Englewood (South Side)
- Malcolm X College, Near West Side (West Side)
- Olive–Harvey College, Pullman (Far South Side)
- Richard J. Daley College, West Lawn (Southwest Side)
- Wilbur Wright College, Dunning (Northwest Side)

== History ==
Crane Junior College opened on September 11, 1911. The first class held by the college had 30 students. By 1929 the enrollment increased to 4,000 students, and Crane was the largest community college in the United States. As a result of the Great Depression, Crane closed. A public campaign against the closure involved nationally famous lawyer Clarence Darrow and several former students and faculty. Less than one year after Crane closed, the community college reopened with additional public and private support as Theodor Herzl Junior College (named in honor of the Jewish Zionist movement founder, Theodor Herzl). Later two new campuses of Herzl J.C. opened—Wilson Junior College established on the South Side, and Wright Junior College opened in northwestern Chicago. After the United States entered World War II, the U.S. military began using the junior colleges as training locations. After the war concluded, new students entered using the financial aid provided by the GI Bill of 1944.

The Junior College system in the post-war years opened Bogan Junior College in southwest Chicago, Fenger College, Southeast College, and Truman College (named for U.S. President Harry S Truman, 1884–1972), in the 1950s. Originally Truman was an evening program located at the city's Amundsen High School. Although it caused a lot of controversy, Wilson J.C. was later renamed Kennedy-King College in 1969 (following the 1968 assassinations, just weeks apart, of Robert F. Kennedy (1925–1968), and Martin Luther King Jr. (1929–1968)), and Herzl J.C. was closed as a college and became an elementary school, with a new Malcolm X College at a different site (for Malcolm X, 1925–1965). In the 1970s, the former Fenger and Southeast Colleges were consolidated and renamed into Olive-Harvey College.

In 1988, Nelvia M. Brady was appointed chancellor of the unified system and was the first African-American and the first female to serve as chancellor. Prior to her appointment, she served as a member of the board of trustees. When she stepped into the post the system was beset with problems including a demoralized staff and a troubled reputation. Her accomplishments include the initiation of new outreach, enrollment and tracking programs; major staff and purchasing practices reorganization; a program to bring Chicago Housing Authority residents into the colleges; the appointment of the first Hispanic Vice Chancellor; and the establishment of a comprehensive "Women Minority Business Program". She served until 1992.

In December 2017, the CCC's television station, WYCC, was purchased by and merged into WTTW, and ceased to exist after 34 years of operation. However, on April 23, 2018, WYCC demerged from WTTW and made a resurgence on the airwaves as an MHz Worldview-affiliated station.

The City Colleges system also includes the Washburne Culinary & Hospitality Institute, Sikia Restaurant, Child Development Centers, and radio station WKKC–FM 89.3.

== Academics ==
Each of the seven institutions within the City College of Chicago system is accredited by the Higher Learning Commission.

=== Reinvention and College to Careers ===
In 2010, City Colleges of Chicago launched "Reinvention", an overhaul program/initiative designed to assess and recommend improvements to all City Colleges programs and operations. Its four goals are to increase the number of students earning degrees, increase the transfer rate to four-year institutions, improve outcomes for students needing remediation and increase the number of adult education and English as a second language students advancing to college-level courses.

The Chicago Tribune editorial board stated that College to Careers was a manner to address "a chronic mismatch between public education and what employers need" through aligning its each of its campuses with a specific job sector so that students can be prepared for specific careers upon graduation.

Launched in 2011 by Rahm Emanuel, Mayor of Chicago, College to Careers partners the colleges with industry leaders in high-growth fields to address the skills gap in Chicago's workforce. The initiative draws industry partners to work with faculty and staff in redesigning occupational program curricula and facilities to better match the needs of employers. College to Careers has initially focused on fast-growing industries in the Chicago region, including healthcare and transportation, distribution and logistics.

In 2012, the City Colleges of Chicago announced that it would partner with companies in the Chicago region to help write curriculum, teach, and place students in jobs across seven sectors, with each college specializing as a "Center for Excellence" in a sector. The sector specializations are as follows:

- Richard J. Daley College is the system's center for advanced manufacturing.
- Kennedy–King College trains students for job openings in the culinary and hospitality industry.
- Wilbur Wright College trains students for jobs in the information technology field.
- Harry S Truman College focuses on education, human, and natural sciences.
- Olive–Harvey College focuses on transportation, distribution, and logistics.
- Malcolm X College trains students for careers in the healthcare field.
- Harold Washington College functions as the center of business, entrepreneurship and professional services.

In April 2013, delegates from the World Bank visited Mayor Rahm Emanuel and City Colleges of Chicago Chancellor Cheryl Hyman at Harold Washington College to learn more about how the colleges partner with industries in the college to careers program. The purpose of the initiative was to determine whether the program could be duplicated around the world.

=== Chicago Star Scholarship ===
Beginning in 2014, through the collaboration of Mayor Rahm Emanuel and Chancellor Cheryl Hyman, City Colleges of Chicago began offering qualifying students the Chicago Star Scholarship. Students who graduated from Chicago Public Schools, beginning in the Fall 2015 semester, could receive up to three years of classes at City Colleges of Chicago at no cost if they earned a high school GPA of 3.0, tested completion-ready in math and English, and enrolled in one of CCC's structured pathways.

By its second year, the Chicago Tribune reported the Star Scholarship program helped nearly 2,000 students attend college tuition free while posting strong fall-to-fall retention and GPAs. To help support these students' academic success after completing at CCC, the Chicago Star Scholarship program partnered with 15 four-year colleges and universities. Each of these partners committed to creating an opportunity that allows Star Scholars to continue their college education following a successful completion at CCC. These packages range in monetary value between $2,500 and nearly $50,000 each year, and include some of the top colleges in the state of Illinois, including; Columbia College, DePaul University, Dominican University, Governors State University, Illinois Institute of Technology, Loyola University, National Louis University, North Park University, Northeastern Illinois University, Northwestern University, Robert Morris University, the School at the Art Institute of Chicago, Roosevelt University, the University of Chicago, and the University of Illinois at Chicago.

=== Partnerships ===
The City Colleges of Chicago have more than 150 corporate partners who work with faculty and staff at six of the City Colleges to develop contemporary curriculum and train students for careers in high-demand and high-growth fields. The partners also exist to help students secure jobs after graduation.

The system has also partnered with Chicago Public Schools (CPS) to form the City Colleges of Chicago Dual Credit program in 60 high schools during the 2015–16 academic year. The program allows high school students to earn both high school and college credit and gain advanced math or English skills. CPS students also have the option to enroll in City Colleges' dual enrollment program, which offers them the opportunity to take college-level courses at CCC campuses. In the Spring of 2013, 500 students are expected to enroll in the Dual Credit program—double the number of students enrolled in the Spring of 2012. By 2016, CCC offered 3,100 seats annually for Dual Enrollment students.

=== Outcomes ===
Since the launch of Reinvention, City Colleges has seen a marked improvement in student success outcomes. As of Fiscal Year 2015, City Colleges has more than doubled the graduation rate and degree awards, increased its credit enrollment, and nearly tripled the number of students who progress from adult education programs, like GED or ESL learning, into credit-earning college classes. All of these improvement were made while maintaining a balanced budget, saving $70 million and undertaking a $500 million capital plan.

In November 2017, news stories broke that these improvements were largely an "illusion", and that for over 10 years, City Colleges had violated its own standard as to what constitutes a degree, watered-down its curriculum, manipulated statistics, and issued thousands of degrees to current and former students who neither requested them or wanted them. During this time, enrollment sharply decreased, while the number of degrees issued more than doubled. The most sensational accusation, reported by several media outlets, was that in 2015, City Colleges adopted a program where degrees were issued to deceased students who had accumulated three-quarters of the credits necessary for graduation, further artificially inflating the graduation rate; Chancellor Cheryl Hyman writes that a total of only six such degrees were awarded, as memorials to the students who had lost their lives, and these six were not included in calculation of graduation rates.

== Governance ==
Officially named Community College District No. 508, CCC is a separate ("sister") agency of the city of Chicago. Its governing body is a board of trustees appointed by the mayor of Chicago and approved by the City Council of Chicago.

In 1976 the trustees of the college system established a residency requirement, requiring employees to live within the city limits of Chicago. Current employees were told that they were required to move to Chicago before July 1, 1980. Employees who did not make the move would face dismissal from their jobs.
