= Jennifer Skogerboe =

American soccer player (born 1992)

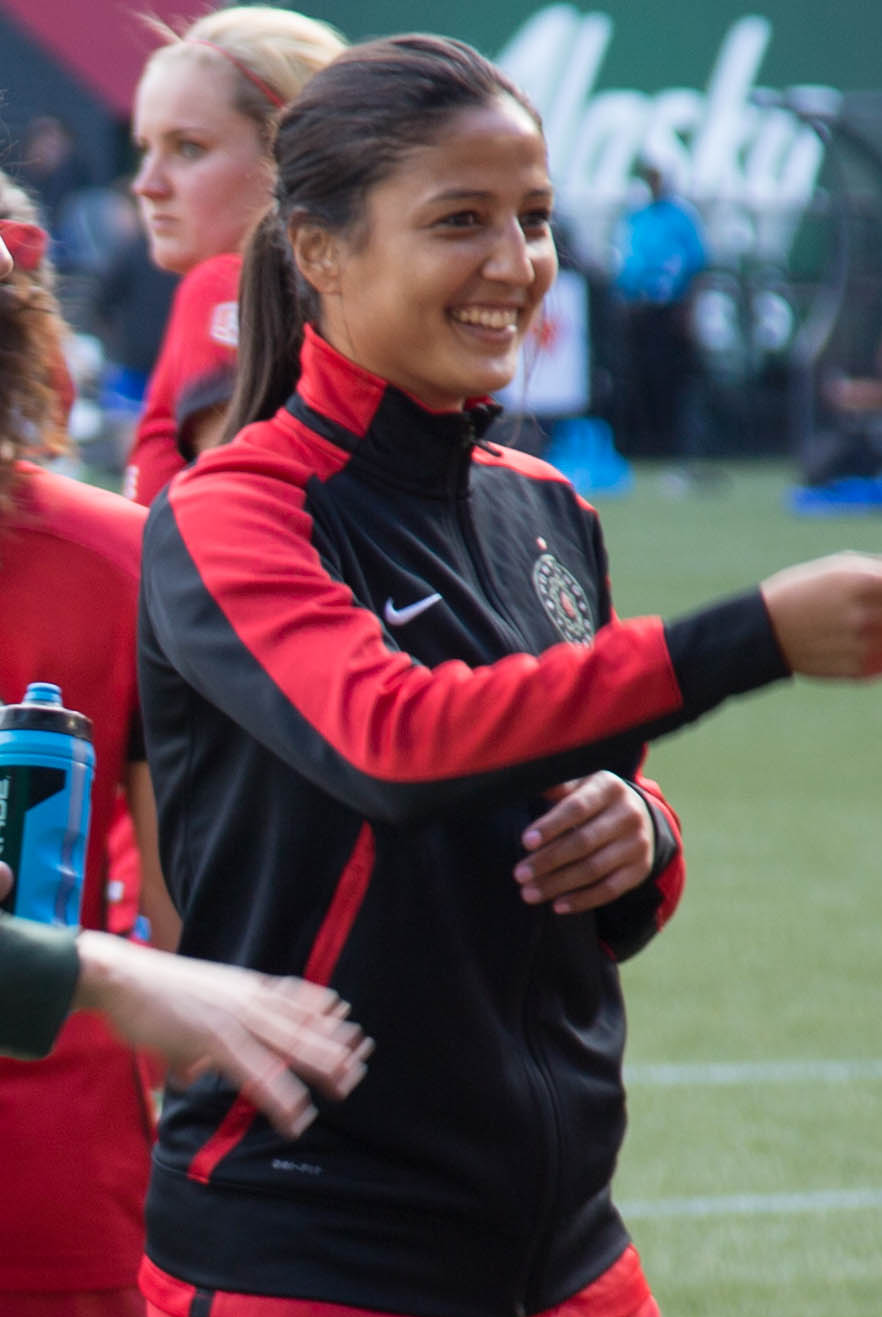
- Skogerboe with Portland Thorns FC in 2016

Personal information
- Full name: Jennifer Lyun Skogerboe
- Date of birth: June 8, 1992 (age 34)
- Place of birth: Yokosuka, Kanagawa, Japan
- Height: 5 ft 6 in (1.68 m)
- Positions: Midfielder; defender

Team information
- Current team: Suwon UDC WFC

Youth career
- Stone Bridge High School

College career
Years	Team	Apps	(Gls)
2010–2013	UConn Huskies	70	(7)

Senior career*
Years	Team	Apps	(Gls)
2011	Ottawa Fury		
2014–2015	Washington Spirit	2	(0)
2015–2016	1. FC Slovácko	10	(0)
2016	Portland Thorns FC	3	(0)
2017–2018	Suwon UDC WFC	36	(0)
- * Club domestic league appearances and goals

Jennifer Lyun Skogerboe (born June 8, 1992) is an American soccer player.

== College career ==
Skogerboe played 70 matches and scored seven goals for the University of Connecticut, playing most as a centre midfielder.

== Club career ==
While still at University of Connecticut, Skogerboe played for D.C. United Women and Washington Spirit Reserves at W-League. Spending three seasons in the league. From 2012 to 2015. She also played two matches with the Spirit core team, between 2014 and 2015. After the 2015 season Skogerboe went overseas and signed with 1. FC Slovácko of Czech First Division. With the czech team, she started 10 matches and helped the team to reach a third place in the league in the 2015–2016 season.

On July 1, 2016 she signed with Portland Thorns FC. Head coach Mark Parsons praised her, stating: "Jen is a technically smooth player, who has good tactical awareness. The most important thing for us in this period is having players that are versatile, and Jen is capable of helping us in multiple positions".

After the 2016 season, the Thorns did not extend Skogerboe's 2017 contract option and she signed with Suwon FMC of the WK League in South Korea.

== Personal life ==
Skogerboe was born in Yokosuka, Kanagawa, Japan. Her father was a Captain in the Navy, so her family used to travel frequently. They settled in several places, including Singapore, Seattle and Washington D.C.
