= Truman College =

Community college in Chicago, Illinois, U.S.

Coordinates: 41.9645°N 87.6590°W

- Former names: Mayfair College (1956–1976)
- Motto: "Education that Works"
- Type: Community college
- Established: 1956; 70 years ago
- Affiliations: City Colleges of Chicago
- Chancellor: Juan Salgado
- President: Shawn Jackson
- Faculty: 64 (Full-time); 194 (Part-time)
- Students: 5,186 (all undergraduate)Spring 2022
- Location: 1145 W. Wilson Avenue, Chicago, Illinois, 60640, United States
- Campus: Urban
- Mascot: Falcons
- Website: ccc.edu/truman

Harry S Truman College is a public municipal community college in the Uptown community area in the north side of Chicago, Illinois, United States. It is part of the City Colleges of Chicago system.

The college offers multiple 2-year associate degrees, as well as occupational training in a number of fields. Located at 1145 West Wilson Avenue in the Uptown neighborhood, the school was named in honor of Harry S. Truman, 33rd U.S. President and a proponent of public colleges and universities. Truman is the largest of the City Colleges of Chicago with a yearly enrollment of over 23,000 students, and has the largest English as a second language and GED program in Illinois.

== History ==
Amundsen High School hosted a night school offering two-year college programming for the North Side of Chicago in 1956. This was the result of community outcry for a two-year college for the economically ailing community areas north of downtown Chicago. Interested in a more permanent situation for the program, community leaders acquired a former elementary school campus in 1961 and enrolled 4,000 students in day and night classes. Further growth led to the construction of its present campus on West Wilson Avenue, opening its doors in 1976, naming the school after U.S. President Truman. In 2014, Truman College was named City Colleges of Chicago's hub for education, human and natural sciences. The designation makes Truman College the final City College to have a College to Careers focus. College to Careers is an initiative to partner the colleges with industry leaders in high-growth fields to address the skills gap in Chicago's workforce. The city of Chicago expects nearly 40,000 job openings in education in the Chicago area over the next decade. This includes positions in child development and teaching subjects including foreign languages, special education, math and sciences.

== Accreditation ==
Truman College is accredited by the Higher Learning Commission and approved by the Illinois Community College Board and the Illinois Office of Education Department of Adult, Vocational, and Technical Education. Accredited by the Higher Learning Commission of the North Central Association of Colleges and Schools, Truman College is also approved by the Illinois Community College Board, the Illinois Board of Higher Education and the Illinois State Board of Education. Truman's Nursing Program is accredited by the State of Illinois, Department of Professional Regulation and the National League for Nursing Accrediting Commission. The Automotive Technology Program is accredited by the National Automotive Technicians' Education Foundation, Inc./Automotive Service Excellence (NATEF). The Cosmetology program is accredited by the State of Illinois, Department of Professional Regulation. The Social Science Child Development Program has received NAEYC Early Childhood Associate Degree Accreditation..

Truman College offers credit classes towards the Associate's degree: Associate of Arts, Associate of Science, Associate of Applied Science, Associate of Arts in Teaching, and Associate in Fine Arts. The school also hosts adult education programs, English as a Second Language curriculum, as well as the General Educational Development program towards the equivalent of a high school diploma. Continuing Education courses for professionals are offered at Truman College.

== Academics ==
The college offers many associate degree programs for students seeking direct entry into a career and those seeking to transfer to a school offering a bachelor's degree. Many vocational certificates are also offered.

== Northeastern Illinois University partnership ==
In response to the shortage of math and science teachers in Illinois, Truman College partnered with Northeastern Illinois University to offer the opportunity of studying towards an Associate of Arts in a teacher preparation program on the Truman College campus.

== Pop culture ==
Truman College was featured in the 2002 Academy Award nominated romantic comedy film, My Big Fat Greek Wedding written by and starring Nia Vardalos, although the scene was not filmed there. In Season 1 of the NBC television drama Chicago Fire, Leon Cruz (played by Jeff Lima) enrolls at Truman College. In Tracy Letts' play "Superior Donuts" the character Franco attends Truman College.
