= Darling Squire =

American dancer and choreographer

Darling Au'saun Aya "Shear" Squire is an American dancer and choreographer.

== Early life and education ==
Squire was born in Naperville, Illinois and grew up between Chicago and Atlanta. She attended North Springs Charter High School of Arts and Sciences in Sandy Springs, Georgia, where she trained in ballet, modern, jazz, and African dance. She graduated from Harold Washington College with a degree in liberal studies in 2013.

== Career ==
Squire moved back to Chicago from Atlanta in 2011 and founded Suna Dance, a collaborative artist group. As a dancer and choreographer, Squire has worked with The Fly Honeys of the Inconvenience, BodyCartography Project, Links Hall, Victoria Bradford, School of the Art Institute of Chicago, DePaul Art Museum, the University of Chicago, the University of Illinois Chicago, Museum of Contemporary Art Chicago, Bubba Carr, Rhonda Henriksen, Salonathon, and Open TV Beta.

In 2017, Squire was a recipient of the 3Arts Make a Wave grant. In 2019, she was nominated for the 3Arts Award. In 2019, she was a recipient of the Between Gestures scholarship from the Goethe-Institut. Through the Goethe-Institut, she attended the ImPulsTanz Vienna International Dance Festival. Squire was also a recipient of the Chicago Dancemakers Forum Lab Artist Award for research and artist development in 2019.

From July 9, 2022 to July 16, 2022, Squire was a guest performing artist in residence at the Montalvo Arts Center.

In 2022, Squire starred in Hauke Berheide and Amy Stebbins' experimental short film "Windy City" at the Tonhalle Düsseldorf.
