= NWSL Player of the Month =

US soccer award

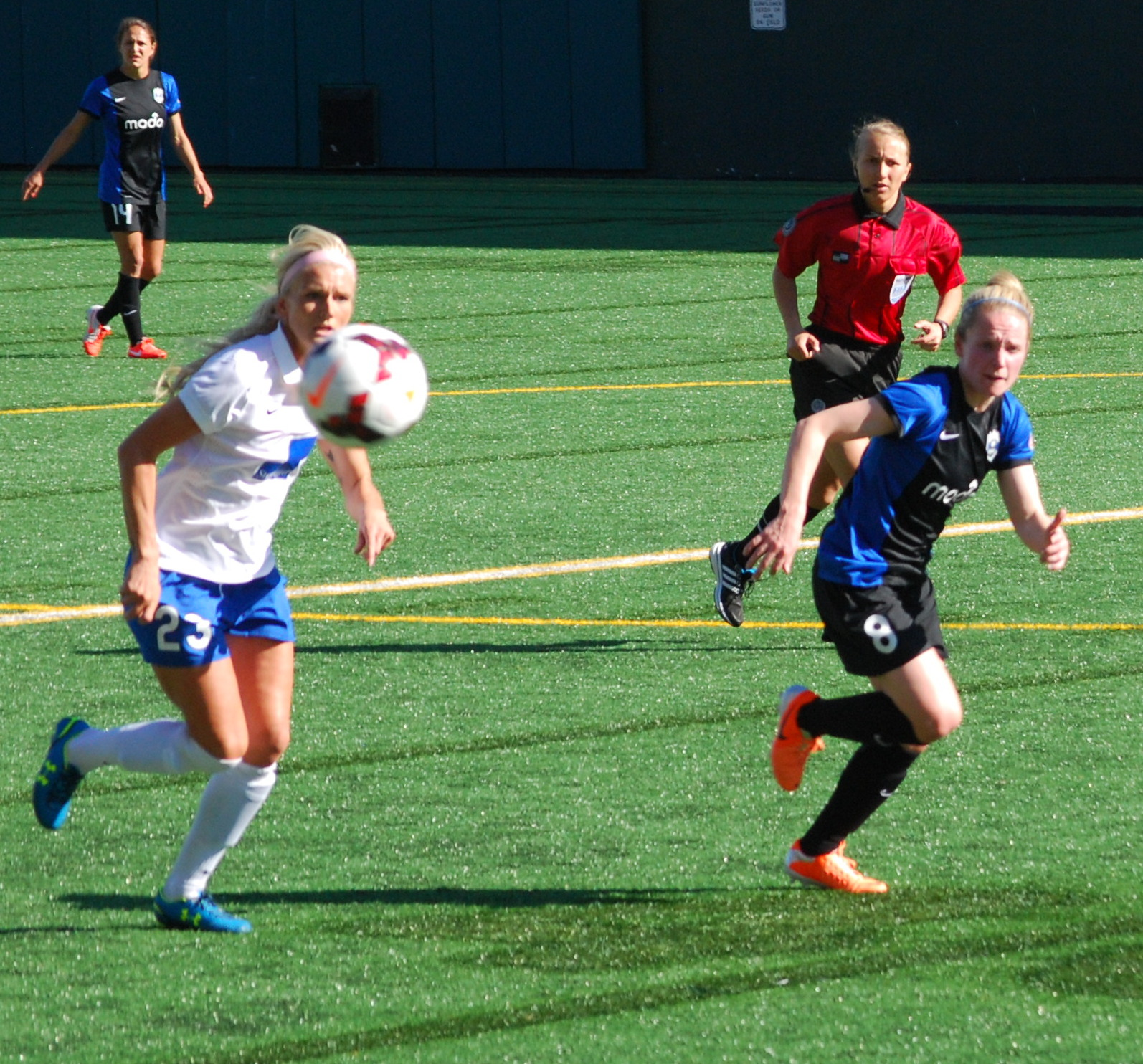
Kim Little (right), four-time winner of the award

The National Women's Soccer League Player of the Month is a monthly women's soccer award given to individual players in the National Women's Soccer League (NWSL). The honor is awarded to the player deemed to have put in the best performances over the past month by a panel selected by the league.

== Selection ==
From 2013 to 2022, the winner was selected by the NWSL Media Association, an organization of journalists who regularly cover the league. Since 2023, the winner is selected by the NWSL Media Association and the league's broadcast talent.

== Winners ==
=== 2013 ===
Month	Player of the Month		Club	Month's Statline
April	(Canada)	Christine Sinclair	Portland Thorns FC	2 G, 1 A in 3 games; Thorns 2–0–1 in April
May	(United States)	Brittany Cameron	Sky Blue FC	0.5 GAA, 4SHO in 6 games; SBFC 4–1–1 in May
June	(United States)	Lauren Cheney	FC Kansas City	6 G, 1 A in 5 games; FCKC 4–2–1 in June
July	(United States)	Erika Tymrak	FC Kansas City	3 G, 1 A in 6 games; FCKC 3–0–3 in July
August	(Mexico)	Mónica Ocampo	Sky Blue FC	3 G, in 3 games

=== 2014 ===
Month	Player of the Month		Club	Month's Statline
April	(Scotland)	Kim Little	Seattle Reign FC	4G in 4 games; Reign 4-0-0 in April
May	(Scotland)	Kim Little	Seattle Reign FC	4G in 5 games; Reign 3-0-2 in May
June	(United States)	Nicole Barnhart	FC Kansas City	1.1 GAA, 4SHO in 4 games; FCKC 5-0-0 in June
July	(Scotland)	Kim Little	Seattle Reign FC	3G, 4A in 6 games; Reign 4-1-1 in July
August	(Denmark)	Nadia Nadim	Sky Blue FC	5G, 1A in 2 games; Sky Blue 4-0-0 in August

=== 2015 ===
Month	Player of the Month		Club	Month's Statline
April	(United States)	Christen Press	Chicago Red Stars	4G, 1A in 2 games; Red Stars 1-0-1 in April
May	(United States)	Sofia Huerta	Chicago Red Stars	5G, 1A in 5 games; Red Stars 3-0-2 in May
June	(Scotland)	Kim Little	Seattle Reign FC	3G, 1A in 3 games; Reigh FC 3-0-0 in June
July	(United States)	Carli Lloyd	Houston Dash	3G in 3 games; Dash 2-1-1 in July (2-0-1 in Lloyd appearances)
August	(United States)	Crystal Dunn	Washington Spirit	6G, 1A in 6 games; Spirit 2-1-3 in August

=== 2016 ===
Month	Player of the Month		Club	Month's Statline
April	(United States)	Tobin Heath	Portland Thorns FC	3 assists in 2 games; Thorns 1-0-1 in April
May	(United States)	Alyssa Naeher	Chicago Red Stars	3 shutouts, 1 goal allowed in 4 games; Red Stars 3-0-2 in May
June	(Canada)	Christine Sinclair	Portland Thorns FC	3 goals and 1 assist; Thorns 3-0-1 in June
July	(Argentina)	Estefania Banini	Washington Spirit	4 goals; Spirit 4-1-0 in July
August/Olympics	(Canada)	Christine Sinclair	Portland Thorns FC	Both as "Olympian of the Month" and "Player of the Olympics"
September	(United States)	Allie Long	Portland Thorns FC	5 goals in 4 games; Thorns 4-0-0 in September

=== 2017 ===
Month	Player of the Month		Club	Month's Statline
April	(United States)	Rose Lavelle	Boston Breakers	1 goal, 1 assist in 3 games; Breakers 2-1-0 in April
May	(Australia)	Sam Kerr	Sky Blue FC	2 goals, 2 assists in 5 games; Sky Blue FC 3-2-0 in May
June	(Australia)	Sam Kerr	Sky Blue FC	3 goals, 1 assist in 4 games; 30th career goal
July	(United States)	Megan Rapinoe	Seattle Reign FC	5 goals in 4 games; Reign FC 2-1-1 in July
August	(United States)	Alex Morgan	Orlando Pride	7 goals, 2 assists, 13 shots on goal, 11 chances created
September	(Brazil)	Marta	Orlando Pride	2 goals, 13 chances created, 85.5% passing accuracy

=== 2018 ===
Month	Player of the Month		Club	Month's Statline
March	(United States)	Megan Rapinoe	Seattle Reign FC	1 goal, 1 assist, 6 shots on goal
April	(United States)	Sofia Huerta	Chicago Red Stars	2 goals, 6 shots on goal, 9 chances created
May	(England)	Rachel Daly	Houston Dash	4 goals, 9 shots on goal, 11 chances created
June	(United States)	Crystal Dunn	North Carolina Courage	2 goals, 9 shots on goal, 8 chances created
July	(United States)	Lindsey Horan	Portland Thorns FC	3 goals, 1 assist, 5 shots on goal, 5 chances created
August	(Australia)	Sam Kerr	Chicago Red Stars	5 goals, 1 assist, 11 shots on goal, 8 chances created

=== 2019 ===
Month	Player of the Month		Club	Statline	Ref.
April	(United States)	Crystal Dunn	North Carolina Courage	4 goals, 2 assists, 3 chances created in 3 games	
May	(Australia)	Sam Kerr	Chicago Red Stars	4 goals in 3 games	
June	(Wales)	Jess Fishlock	Reign FC	3 goals, 1 assist, 8 shots, 7 chances created in 3 games	
July	(United States)	Kristen Hamilton	North Carolina Courage	5 goals and 2 assists; 4 goals in a single match	
August	(United States)	Christen Press	Utah Royals FC	3 goals, 12 chances created	

=== 2020 ===
The 2020 NWSL regular season was cancelled due to the COVID-19 pandemic.

=== 2021 ===
Month	Player of the Month		Club	Statline	Ref.
May	(United States)	Alex Morgan	Orlando Pride	4 goals in 4 games	
June	(United States)	Lynn Williams	North Carolina Courage	4 goals in back-to-back victories	
July	(United States)	Ashley Hatch	Washington Spirit	League-high 3 goals	
August	(United States)	Megan Rapinoe	OL Reign	League-high 4 goals	
September	(United States)	Bethany Balcer	OL Reign	3 goals in 3 games, leading Golden Boot race	
October	(United States)	Margaret Purce	NJ/NY Gotham FC	3 goals, 17 shots; brace vs. NC	

=== 2022 ===
Month	Player of the Month		Club	Statline	Ref.
May	(United States)	Alex Morgan	San Diego Wave FC	Led scoring with 6 goals	
June	(United States)	Sophia Smith	Portland Thorns FC	5 goals; scored goal or assist in last 5 matches	
July	(England)	Ebony Salmon	Houston Dash	4 goals; youngest NWSL player to score a hat-trick	
August	(United States)	Megan Rapinoe	OL Reign	Led scoring with 4 goals, 3 assists	
September/ October	(Brazil)	Debinha	North Carolina Courage	Hat-trick vs. NJY; 7 goals	

=== 2023 ===
Month	Player of the Month		Club	Statline	Ref.
March/ April	(United States)	Sophia Smith	Portland Thorns FC	Hat-trick vs. KC; 4 goals, 4 assists	
May	(United States)	Savannah DeMelo	Racing Louisville FC	Brace vs. KC; 3 goals, 2 assists	
June	(United States)	Sophia Smith (2)	Portland Thorns FC	Hat-trick vs. WAS; 6 goals	
July	(United States)	Savannah McCaskill	Angel City FC	Challenge Cup brace vs. POR; 3 goals	
August	(United States)	Messiah Bright	Orlando Pride	Brace vs. NCC; 3 goals	
September/ October	(United States)	Savannah McCaskill (2)	Angel City FC	2 goals, 1 assist	

=== 2024 ===
Month	Player of the Month		Club	Statline	Ref.
March/ April	(Brazil)	Bia Zaneratto	Kansas City Current	4 goals, 3 assists	
May	(Zambia)	Barbra Banda	Orlando Pride	7 goals, 1 assist	
June	(Malawi)	Temwa Chawinga	Kansas City Current	6 goals, 2 assists	
July	(United States)	Ally Sentnor	Utah Royals	3 goals, 1 assist	
August	(United States)	Ella Stevens	NJ/NY Gotham FC	3 goals, 2 assists	
September	(Malawi)	Temwa Chawinga (2)	Kansas City Current	4 goals; set record for scoring in consecutive games (8)	
October/ November	(Malawi)	Temwa Chawinga (3)	Kansas City Current	5 goals in 4 matches; set all-time season goalscoring record (20); 1st player to score against all active teams in single season	

=== 2025 ===
Month	Player of the Month		Club	Statline	Ref.
March	(Malawi)	Temwa Chawinga	Kansas City Current	3 goals; tied own record for scoring in consecutive games (8)	
April	(Spain)	Esther González	Gotham FC	7 goals; 3 braces	
May	(Malawi)	Temwa Chawinga (2)	Kansas City Current	goal in 3 consecutive matches; fastest in league history to 25 goals (34 games)	
June	(Spain)	Esther González (2)	Gotham FC	3 goals, 1 brace; 10 goals, 4 braces on season; has scored 10 of Gotham's 16 goals this season	
August	(Brazil)	Ludmila	Chicago Stars FC	5 goals, 1 hat trick; fastest hat trick in league history, 9 goals on season	
September	(United States)	Trinity Rodman	Washington Spirit	3 goals, 2 assists; led league in goal contributions	
October/November	(Japan)	Manaka Matsukubo	North Carolina Courage	4 goals; youngest player in NWSL history to record a hat trick	

=== 2026 ===
Month	Player of the Month		Club	Statline	Ref.
March	(Iceland)	Sveindís Jane Jónsdóttir	Angel City FC	3 goals, 2 assists in 3 matches	
April	(United States)	Ashley Sanchez	North Carolina Courage	3 goals in 3 matches	
May	(Malawi)	Temwa Chawinga	Kansas City Current	7 goals in 6 matches	
July	(United States)	Trinity Rodman	Washington Spirit	6 goals in 6 matches	
August	(United States)	Ashley Sanchez (2)	North Carolina Courage	5 goals, 2 assists in 6 matches	
September	(United States)	Ashley Sanchez (3)	North Carolina Courage	5 goals in 4 matches	

== Multiple winners ==
As of October 1, 2026

The below table lists players who have won on more than one occasion.

**Bold**	Indicates current NWSL player

Rank	Player	Team(s)	Wins
1	**Temwa Chawinga**	**Kansas City Current**	6
2	Kim Little	Reign FC	4
2	Megan Rapinoe	Reign FC	4
4	Crystal Dunn	Washington Spirit, North Carolina Courage	3
4	**Sam Kerr**	Sky Blue FC, Chicago Red Stars	3
4	Alex Morgan	Orlando Pride, San Diego Wave FC	3
4	**Ashley Sanchez**	**North Carolina Courage**	3
4	Christine Sinclair	Portland Thorns FC	3
4	**Sophia Wilson** (née Smith)	**Portland Thorns FC**	3
10	Esther González	Gotham FC	2
10	**Sofia Huerta**	Chicago Red Stars	2
10	Christen Press	Chicago Red Stars, Utah Royals FC	2
10	**Savannah McCaskill**	Angel City FC	2
10	**Trinity Rodman**	**Washington Spirit**	2

== See also ==
- List of sports awards honoring women
- NWSL Rookie of the Month
- NWSL Player of the Week
- NWSL Team of the Month
- NWSL awards
- NWSL records and statistics
- Women's soccer in the United States
