= Shane Gericke =

American novelist

Shane Gericke is an American novelist originally from Illinois, who currently lives in Phoenix, Arizona. Before becoming a published thriller writer, he was a journalist, most prominently at the Chicago Sun-Times from 1982 to 1994.

== Gericke's novels ==
Gericke's first three novels star Naperville police officer Emily Thompson. His 2015 novel The Fury introduced Chicago police detective Sue Davis. After a long absence, Gericke returned with a new novel in 2025, Ocean Of Bones

=== Novels ===
- Blown Away, 2006. ISBN 0-7860-1813-5.
- Cut to the Bone, 2007. ISBN 0-7860-1814-3.
- Torn Apart, 2010.
- The Fury, 2015.
- Ocean of Bones, 2025.

Some Gericke bibliographies include a 1998 novel called Crusade. This book was sold and assigned an ISBN, but the publisher went bankrupt before any copies were printed, and the book has never actually seen publication.
