= WYCC =

Television station in Chicago (1965–2022)

- Chicago, Illinois; United States
- Channels: Digital: 25 (UHF), shared with WTTW; Virtual: 20
- Branding: WYCC FNX

Programming
- Affiliations: Inst. (1965–1974); Dark (1974–1983, 2017–2018); PBS (1983–2017); MHz Worldview (2018–2020); FNX (2020–2022)

Ownership
- Owner: Window to the World Communications, Inc.
- Sister stations: WTTW, WFMT

History
- First air date: September 20, 1965 (original incarnation); February 17, 1983
- Last air date: June 1, 2022
- Former call signs: WXXW (1965–1977); WCME (1977–1983)
- Former channel numbers: Analog: 20 (UHF, 1983–2009); Digital: 21 (UHF, 2003–2018); 47 (UHF, 2018–2019)
- Call sign meaning: "We're Your City Colleges" (owner, 1983–2017)

Technical information
- Facility ID: 12279
- ERP: 250 kW
- HAAT: 496 m (1,627 ft)
- Transmitter coordinates: 41°52′44.1″N 87°38′10.2″W

WYCC (channel 20) was a public television station in Chicago, Illinois, United States. It was last owned by not-for-profit broadcasting entity Window to the World Communications, Inc., alongside PBS member station WTTW (channel 11) and classical music radio station WFMT (98.7 FM). WYCC's operations were housed with WTTW and WFMT in the Renée Crown Public Media Center, located at 5400 North Saint Louis Avenue (adjacent to the main campus of Northeastern Illinois University) in the city's North Park neighborhood; WYCC and WTTW shared transmitter facilities atop the Willis Tower on South Wacker Drive in the Chicago Loop. WYCC previously maintained studios at Kennedy–King College on South Union Avenue and Halsted Parkway in the Englewood neighborhood.

Channel 20 was started as a secondary channel for educational programming from WTTW in 1965, under the call sign WXXW. It continued in this role until it was shuttered in 1974. After being transferred to a consortium of educational institutions but never returned to air, the City Colleges of Chicago obtained the license in 1982 and brought it back to air in February 1983 as WYCC ("We're Your City Colleges"). It served as a secondary public station in Chicago, where WTTW was the primary PBS station, and focused on instructional programs and output from independent producers. The City Colleges sold the underlying spectrum for $16 million in 2016, and after shelving initial plans to shut down at that time, in October 2017, WYCC dropped its long-running affiliation with PBS to air MHz Worldview; a month later, on November 27, it went off the air completely and was sold to Window to the World, essentially becoming a subchannel of WTTW with a separate license, airing MHz Worldview and then First Nations Experience (FNX).

Window to the World Communications relinquished the license of WYCC, with an effective date of June 1, 2022. With the license defunct, WTTW replaced FNX with the World Channel, now mapping to channel 11.6.

== Prior attempts to activate channel 20 ==
On the heels of the Federal Communications Commission (FCC)'s recent lifting of its moratorium on new television station applications (the result of the agency's passage of the Sixth Report & Order of 1952) as well as the opening of additional channels on the UHF band, WIND Inc., a joint venture between the Chicago Daily News and the family of Ralph J. Atlass—one-time owners of radio stations WBBM (780 AM) and WIND (560 AM)—petitioned the FCC for a construction permit to build a television station on UHF channel 20, which would be licensed to nearby Gary, Indiana. The group also applied for and received the call letters WIND-TV for their new station, which never signed on under their purview. On November 8, 1956, the Westinghouse Electric Corporation purchased the construction permit and WIND radio for $5.3 million.

UHF stations struggled mightily during the 1950s, with many shutting down outright, due partly to the fact that manufacturers did not include UHF tuners in television sets (an issue that was remedied when the FCC made these tuners a requirement for sets made from 1964 onward through its passage of the All-Channel Receiver Act). By the end of the decade, Westinghouse Broadcasting had soured on the idea of launching a station in the Chicago market. After the FCC sent 50 permitholders letters in February 1960 inquiring as to their plans for the station, WIND-TV was among five that were deleted at the owners' request.

== WXXW ==
First conceived in 1953 and debuting in September 1955 as Chicago's first non-commercial educational television station, WTTW (channel 11) began to experience growing pains by the early 1960s. Gradually moving away from its original mission of providing classroom instructional courses as more and more of its broadcast day was filled first with programming from National Educational Television (NET) and those distributed by other member stations, the idea of a second station seemed like the perfect answer to provide additional sources for the displaced educational programming. In October 1962, the FCC, at the request of WTTW's owner, then known as the Chicago Educational Television Association (CETA), changed channel 20's status to reserved noncommercial. The CETA filed for the construction permit on January 18, 1963, receiving it on September 23.

WTTW intended to devote the program schedule of the station—to be given the call sign WXXW—for a variety of instructional programs including such concepts as training for police officers and firefighters and professional development for doctors and dentists. The new WXXW would also engage in rebroadcasting of the Midwest Program on Airborne Television Instruction school programs at times more convenient to Chicago schools than their initial broadcast from airplanes flying high above Indiana.

The WXXW antenna had been intended to be placed on the Field Building, from which WTTW had broadcast, but a proposed skyscraper to be built by First National Bank of Chicago created possible multipath interference issues for both stations. 1000 Lake Shore Plaza offered free antenna space to both stations; the antenna switch set WXXW back from a planned September 1964 debut. However, the planned expansion of educational television for schools was carried out by retaining some instructional programs on WTTW and purchasing time on the other UHF station in the city, WCIU-TV (channel 26).

On September 20, 1965, WXXW signed on as Chicago's second UHF television station and second non-commercial outlet. However, the station, known as "the Classroom of the Air" and financed entirely from school reimbursements for educational programming, was essentially a failure. Plagued by a weak signal and broadcasting only in black-and-white and a schedule filled with what former WTTW station manager Edward Morris called "talking heads and a blackboard", WXXW continued in service for nearly nine years. It shut down in August 1974 when a tube in the transmitter failed. It would have cost $12,000 to replace. WTTW general manager William McCarter told the Chicago Daily News, "OK, what if it goes? We're through, and there are so many other things to spend $12,000 on." He also cited the expense of having channels 11 and 20 at different transmitter sites. The station had held a construction permit to move to the John Hancock Center since 1972.

== Becoming WYCC ==
In 1975, the Chicago Metropolitan Higher Education Council was formed to coordinate alternative and external education programming. Its members included Chicago State University, the City Colleges of Chicago, Governors State University, Northeastern Illinois University, and University of Illinois at Chicago Circle. The license for WXXW was transferred to the council in 1977, with the call sign changed to WCME. The consortium, which was led by City Colleges chancellor Oscar Shabat, had earlier examined the purchase of the partially built but unused WCFL-TV (channel 38) because channel 20 would have needed a new Sears Tower antenna installed. The consortium projected a mid-1979 start date to return channel 20 to the air after obtaining the license, but governor Jim Thompson vetoed funding allocated by the Illinois General Assembly because Chicago already had a public television station. In 1980, a proposal was made by the Center for New Television, an alternative production house, to share channel 20 with the higher education council; instructional programs would air during the day, with the Center for New Television airing a live evening program. The proposal was not well-received, leading Gary Deeb of the Chicago Sun-Times to call the council an "utterly inept group of small-college presidents".

With channel 20 still not on the air, the consortium offered to transfer the license to the City Colleges in 1981, an offer accepted by the colleges. When it returned to the air as WYCC on February 17, 1983, the station began airing telecourses in such titles as "History of the American People from 1865", "Descriptive Astronomy 1", and "Introduction to Business". It broadcast for 52 hours a week with an annual budget of just $275,000 and 20 staffers; Elynne Chaplik Aleskow, the general manager, was the first woman to hold that post at a Chicago TV station. By 1987, the station had an annual budget of $1 million—$300,000 from the Corporation for Public Broadcasting and the rest from the City Colleges—and was reputedly the only PBS station to never have aired a pledge drive. It was on the air for 18 hours a day, though its only regular programming produced in-house was a weekly talk show with the City Colleges chancellor plus specials, news updates, and program promotions. The audience for its college courses had increased to 10,000 by 1991 and 15,000 by 1993.

== More local programming ==
In 1992, the City Colleges closed City-Wide College, the extension division under which WYCC was operated, with Harold Washington College absorbing most of its functions, though the studios were located at Daley College. Four years later, the station began to introduce its own local program productions. Irma Blanco, at the time a morning co-host on Chicago radio, hosted the arts program Absolute Artistry. Other programs included the education magazine Educate! and profiles of Chicago personalities on First from Chicago.

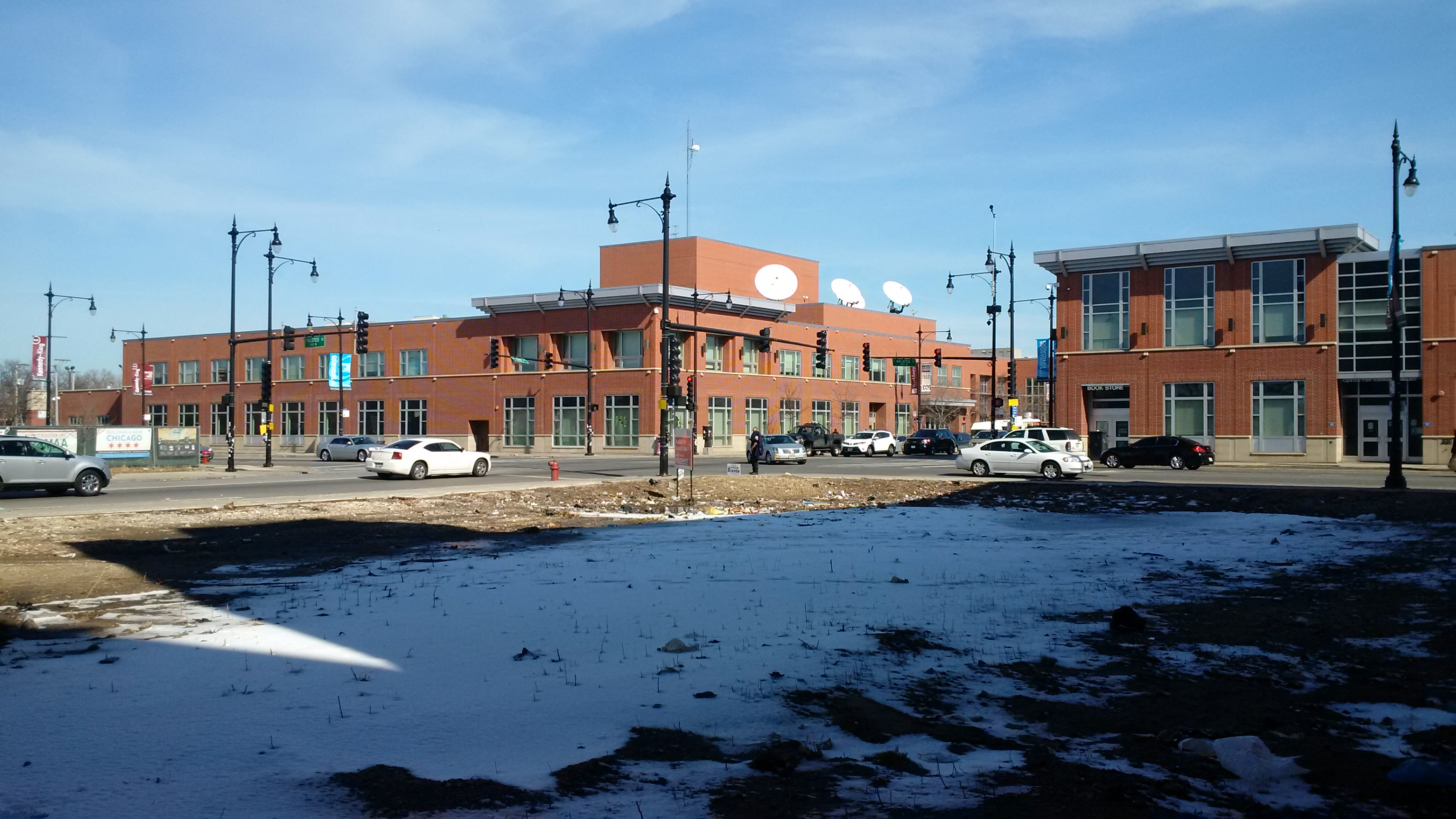
New studios (pictured) were built as part of the relocation of Kennedy–King College in 2007. The antenna seen is for the college's FM station, WKKC 89.3.

In 1999, it was proposed to move WYCC to a rebuilt Kennedy-King College in the city's Englewood neighborhood. This materialized eight years later, when the new facility opened in 2007; it was also part of a high-definition production pilot for PBS. The work also coincided with the station's digital television transition. WYCC began broadcasting in digital on May 1, 2003, and converted completely to digital on April 16, 2009.

WYCC continued to grow its portfolio of local public affairs programming. A televised version of political talk show Beyond the Beltway, which also airs nationally on radio, ran on WYCC until the end. In 2011, Garrard McClendon, formerly seen on CLTV, began hosting Off 63rd with Garrard McClendon, which won a regional Emmy Award. In 2013, WYCC debuted In the Loop, a half-hour weekly public affairs show on Thursday evenings, hosted by Barbara Pinto and Chris Bury (both of whom formerly served as correspondents for ABC News); Robin Robinson and Lauren Cohn (both former anchors at WFLD) joined the program as rotating co-hosts starting in September 2015. In addition, WYCC aired programs produced by the Pritzker Military Library.

== Spectrum auction ==
In 2015, the Chicago Tribune editorial board recommended WYCC sell its license in the forthcoming spectrum auction. After initial refusal, mayor Rahm Emanuel authorized the City Colleges to sell the license.

In April 2017, WYCC sold its spectrum for $15,959,957; at the time, the station indicated that it would enter into a post-auction channel sharing agreement. Not only was the bid much lower than many had expected, but the potential windfall would be further eroded by continuing expenses, as the station's lease for antenna space at the John Hancock Center ran through 2029. On September 13, 2017, WYCC announced in a letter to contributors that it would shut down October 25, 2017; most of the station's staff had been laid off following the conclusion of the auction. However, prior to September 22, 2017, WTTW approached WYCC with a channel-sharing agreement to stay on the air. WYCC then announced in a letter to employees that it would remain on the air through November 24; if a channel-sharing agreement was reached, operation of WYCC's channels would be handled by WTTW, with a tentative plan to use "a combination of WYCC and WTTW brands and programming". The deadline to file a plan with the FCC was November 24, 2017. In 2016, WYCC had an annual budget of $8.2 million, of which the City Colleges provided $5.7 million. The station lost $732,000 in 2016 in its non-operating budget, despite funding from the Corporation for Public Broadcasting, the state of Illinois, and private donors.

== Sale to WTTW and closure ==
On October 25, 2017, a notice was posted on the station's website saying that subchannel 20.1 would broadcast MHz WorldView, though the station announced there would be no changes to the 20.2 or 20.3 subchannels. WorldView, which offered international news and entertainment programming, had been carried on a subchannel of WYCC since 2010; the 20.2 subchannel had been airing First Nations Experience (FNX) since November 1, 2013. WTTW began accepting WYCC members.

On December 7, 2017, Window to the World Communications, owner of WTTW, announced that it was seeking to purchase WYCC from the City Colleges of Chicago, in a move that would put the two stations back under the same corporate umbrella. However, the license assignment application was not submitted to the FCC until late January 2018, which disclosed that Window to the World Communications would acquire the WYCC license for $100,000. As part of the purchase, WYCC entered into a channel sharing agreement with WTTW. The sale was approved by the FCC on March 13, 2018, and was completed on April 20. As a part of MHz WorldView's closure on March 1, 2020, WTTW planned to move World programming to channel 20.1, while its original channel slot (11.3) would have broadcast Create. However, WTTW changed its plan to provide FNX programming instead.

In May 2022, Window to the World Communications filed an application to dissolve the WTTW-WYCC channel sharing agreement on June 1, 2022, announcing that the WYCC license would be surrendered after that date. The license was canceled on June 2, 2022.
