= Robert Bragg =

Robert Bragg may refer to:

- Robert Bragg (pilot) (1937–2017), first officer on Pan Am Flight 1736, in the Tenerife airport disaster
- Robert Henry Bragg Jr. (1919–2017), American professor in the Department of Materials Science and Engineering
