= Late Registration =

Studio album by Kanye West
- Released: August 30, 2005
- Recorded: 2004–2005
- Studios: Chalice (Hollywood); Grandmaster (Hollywood); Record Plant (Hollywood); Sony Music (New York)
- Genres: Hip-hop; pop rap; progressive rap
- Length: 70:25
- Labels: Roc-A-Fella; Def Jam
- Producers: Kanye West; Devo Springsteen; Jon Brion; Just Blaze; Warryn "Baby Dubb" Campbell

Kanye West chronology
The College Dropout (2004)	Late Registration (2005)	Late Orchestration (2006)

Singles from Late Registration
- 1. "Diamonds from Sierra Leone" Released: May 2005; 2. "Gold Digger" Released: July 5, 2005; 3. "Heard 'Em Say" Released: October 24, 2005; 4. "Touch the Sky" Released: January 1, 2006; 5. "Drive Slow" Released: June 6, 2006

Late Registration is the second studio album by the American rapper Kanye West. It was released on August 30, 2005, through Roc-A-Fella Records and Def Jam Recordings. West recorded the album over the course of a year during sessions held at studios in Hollywood and New York City, in collaboration with Jon Brion. The album features guest appearances from Adam Levine, Jamie Foxx, Common, Brandy, Lupe Fiasco, Jay-Z, and Nas, among others.

West's production for Late Registration departed from the sped-up soul samples of his debut studio album, The College Dropout (2004), moving towards a more elaborate and orchestral style with a 20-piece ensemble. Drawing creative inspiration from alternative rock acts such as Fiona Apple and Portishead, he experimented with musical shifts, string arrangements, and a variety of instruments not usually associated with hip-hop, including a celesta, harpsichord, and Chinese bells. In an effort to write authentic yet relatable lyrics, West engages in storytelling while showcasing his Christian heritage that informed his relationship to the capitalist market economy. He critiques multiple issues, such as institutional racism, higher education, health care, and the blood diamond trade.

A widespread critical success, Late Registration has often been viewed as a progression from The College Dropout and a pivotal release in hip-hop. Numerous reviewers praised the former's elegant and ambitious musical direction, while some highlighted West's songwriting and performances for their balance of pop and conscious hip-hop sensibilities. It was named to year-end lists for 2005 by multiple publications, such as Rolling Stone, Time, and USA Today. The album led to West receiving eight nominations at the 48th Annual Grammy Awards, including Album of the Year and Best Rap Album, winning the latter.

Surpassing The College Dropout's commercial success, Late Registration debuted at number one on the US Billboard 200 and sold 860,000 copies in the first week, while reaching the top 10 in nine other countries, including the United Kingdom and Ireland. It eventually sold more than 3,000,000 copies in the US and received a five-times platinum certification from the Recording Industry Association of America (RIAA), as well as sales certifications in several other territories. Five accompanying singles were released, including the hits "Touch the Sky", "Heard 'Em Say", and "Gold Digger", the latter of which topped the Billboard Hot 100. Music videos for all five singles were produced, while West also promoted the album with the Touch the Sky Tour (2005–06) and his debut live album, Late Orchestration (2006). Since then, Late Registration has frequently appeared on top albums lists, including Rolling Stone's "500 Greatest Albums of All Time", on which it ranked 117th in 2020.

== Background ==
Late Registration is the second of Kanye West's planned four education-themed studio albums, following the major success of his 2004 debut The College Dropout. The album showcased his signature production style of using sped-up vocal samples from soul records, known as "chipmunk soul". However, because of its success, other hip-hop artists widely imitated this sampling style. In response to this, and fearing his own dependence on the technique, West decided to find a new sound and progress in both songwriting and stylistic range. West enlisted the film score composer and record producer Jon Brion for Late Registration, resulting in Brion serving as co-executive producer for several tracks. The rapper heard and liked Brion's score while watching the 2004 film Eternal Sunshine of the Spotless Mind, and also listened to songs he had produced for the singer-songwriter Fiona Apple's second album, When the Pawn... (1999). Apple was another one of West's favorite acts and sources of musical inspiration for Late Registration, whose direction West described as "that Coldplay, Portishead, Fiona Apple style". Portishead's 1994 album Dummy was another reference point for West's direction with the album.

Brion was inexperienced in creating hip-hop records when initially collaborating with West, yet the two were able to productively work together after only one afternoon in the studio when they discovered that neither confined his musical knowledge and vision to any specific genre. Discussing Late Registration differing in direction from standard hip-hop, Brion said, "There are colors and ideas that make [the album] different from average hip-hop, but Kanye is already different from the average hip-hop guy. He's got this sense of pop record-making which is really solid, and he likes tracks with a lot of things going on in them – which is not necessarily common for hip-hop. He was already barking up that tree."

== Recording ==
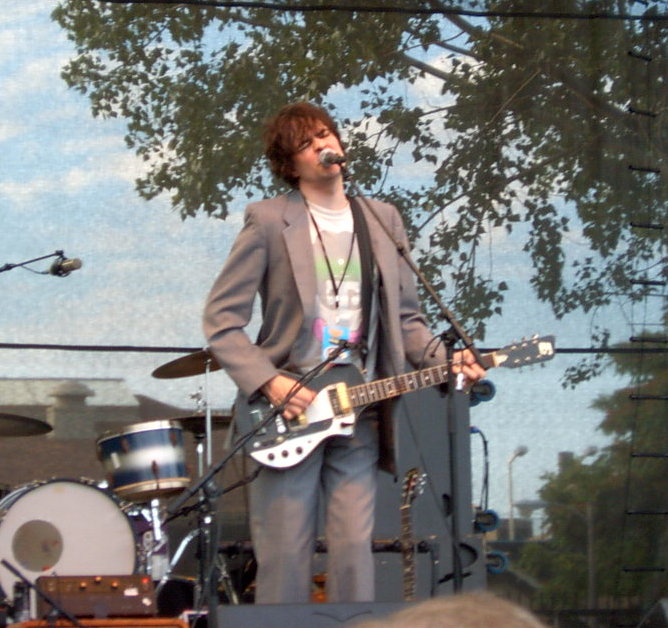
Film score composer Jon Brion (shown in 2006) assisted with the album's production.

West spent approximately two million USD to produce Late Registration, recording it in slightly over a year. The majority of the recording sessions for the album took place at Sony Music Studios in New York City and the Record Plant in Hollywood, California; further sessions were held at other Hollywood locations Chalice Recording Studios and Grandmaster Recording Studios. In June 2004, the rapper made plans to begin recording material after finishing his support of R&B singer Usher's Truth Tour. By November, West had completed around 75 percent of the album. However, he felt unsatisfied with the outcome and this led to Brion becoming involved in March 2005, which drastically altered the project's direction.

The album's recording sessions between West and Brion were largely exploratory, as the pair experimented with a broad spectrum of sounds. West would construct a song's basic structure, bringing in a sample, drum beat programming, and occasionally unfinished rap verses. After thinking through what musical direction to take, he would then select from a variety of unique instruments that Brion both provided and played, including drums and strings. With the instruments, West attempted to incorporate a distinctive sound into the song's texture. West envisioned the recording as the creation of a film: visualizing the songs as scenes, outlining each in such a way that they efficiently conveyed their respective social or introspective context, and ensuring all were synchronized within the fabric of the complete set. This sentiment was shared by Brion who said, "He thinks in frequency ranges. I can recognize when someone sees music architecturally, which is how I work. I see it as a spatial thing: left to right, front to back, up and down. It's animated and it's moving in real time. Kanye has that. He tries things out until it fits, until it sits where it is supposed to sit and everything has the correct emotional function."

For Late Registration, West also collaborated with guest artists, whom he selected based on the effect each of their voices had on him upon hearing them. He cited the serene vocals of pop rock band Maroon 5's lead vocalist Adam Levine, the trademark voice of Brandy, the rap skill of his frequent collaborator Jay-Z, and the lyricism of fellow rapper Paul Wall as primary examples. Levine is featured on the album's opening track, "Heard 'Em Say". The two had previously collaborated on a remix for "This Love" (2004) that Maroon 5 commissioned West to work on and later became good friends when sitting together on a flight to Rome for the 2004 MTV Europe Music Awards. While playing songs from his second album via his iPod for him on the flight, West presented the demo for "Heard 'Em Say", to which Levine added a hook he had recently written and thought was an ideal fit. The song was recorded quickly because the singer only had a couple of hours free for studio time, and Brion was able to effectively work with the composition and Levine's vocal track in a few hours.

West originally produced and recorded "Gold Digger" at Ludacris's home in Atlanta, Georgia, for fellow rapper Shawnna's 2004 debut album Worth tha Weight. He had written the chorus from a female first-person viewpoint, though Shawnna ultimately passed the song on to him. West then rewrote the two verses from his own point of view and shortly before the release of "Gold Digger" in 2005, he penned a third verse; the final recording and mastering was done at Sony Music Studios in a week. After he saw singer Jamie Foxx's portrayal of singer-songwriter Ray Charles when watching the 2004 film Ray with his friend John Mayer, West decided to have him sing an interpolation of Charles' song "I Got a Woman". Once the track was in place, it was layered with additional instruments that Brion contributed.

Wall appears alongside West and his GOOD Music labelmate GLC on "Drive Slow". It was recorded in Los Angeles after the two had formed a friendship while posing for a photo shoot for an August 2005 issue of King, in a spread titled "Coming Kings". West had originally wanted British-Sri Lankan rapper M.I.A. to appear on the track, but she opted out of the appearance due to a busy schedule. "My Way Home" is performed solely by West's GOOD Music associate and fellow rapper Common, whose sixth studio album Be was being produced and recorded by West alongside Late Registration. Certain tracks originally produced by West for the former turned into beats for his own work. 107 tracks were recorded during a Pro Tools session for "Bring Me Down"—48 of which were solely sung by Brandy—and the editing process for the tracks lasted one day.

West first crafted "Diamonds from Sierra Leone" as a song about his friendship with his crew, until he learned of the civil war in Sierra Leone financed by conflict diamonds and re-recorded it. While the original version of the song featured West as the sole performer, he decided to record a remix with a guest verse provided by Jay-Z. Both the original and remix versions of "Diamonds from Sierra Leone" appear on the album, with the former included as a bonus track. The original contains live drums played by Michel Gondry, the director of Eternal Sunshine of the Spotless Mind and later the first music video for "Heard 'Em Say"; he had visited the studio one day when a drum kit was set up by Brion. According to Jay-Z, West mixed "Diamonds from Sierra Leone" about 14 times before he felt comfortable with premiering it. The recording was further delayed when West and Brion were required to wait two weeks to rent the harpsichord that they used for the percussion. West recorded a verse by fellow rapper Nas for the track "We Major", even though the rapper was engaged in a feud with Jay-Z at the time. Despite this, West revealed that the song is regarded by Jay-Z as his favorite on Late Registration. "Hey Mama" was first recorded by West as early as 2000.

Brion experienced difficulty conducting a 20-piece orchestra for "Celebration", as its musicians were distracted when giggling at West's humorous lyrics. West and Brion had some minor discord for "Roses"; Brion initially layered it with keyboard arrangements, only for West to remove his keys along with the beat and completely reconfigure the entire song so that the verses are built around the rhythm of his vocals, while Brion's arrangements arrive during the choruses. Brion later lightheartedly compared the indecision surrounding the construction of the track to that of Prince's well-known last-minute removal of the bassline from "When Doves Cry" (1984). Singer Patti LaBelle recalled having contributed vocals to "Roses": "I was in [West's] studio one night, and he and his mother both asked if I'd just sing something on this song." The singer further stated that she was not credited because the album's liner notes "had already been printed up".

== Music and production ==
West's prize catch, audibly enriching at least half [the] songs, is co-producer Jon Brion ... adding an unprecedented third element to West's proven meld of hitbound soul hooks and rhythm tracks made or played. There's never been hip-hop so complex and subtle musically.

— Robert Christgau

The music of Late Registration blends West's primary hip-hop production with Brion's elaborate orchestration and experimentally delves into a wide variety of genres, including pop, R&B, soul, and G-funk. With the presence of Brion, who conducted a 20-piece orchestra and played instruments chosen by West, the album is largely orchestral in nature, featuring string arrangements, drums, gospel choirs, a 360 digital keyboard, guitars, pianos, and brass, among other symphonic instrumentation. Brion further incorporated authentic instruments, such as a celesta, Chamberlin, harpsichord, Chinese bells, and berimbau.

In a piece about Late Registration, Serena Kim of Vibe magazine noted how West uses unconventional styles and sudden musical shifts in song structures, drawing comparisons to the Beatles' experimental era. Kim observed a heavy difference between the album and West's previous work, stating, "West ambitiously attempts to depart from the street sensibilities of Dropout by giving Late Registration a shiny, quasi-alt-pop finish." Rolling Stone writer Rob Sheffield concurred with this sentiment, analyzing that West "claims the whole world of music as hip-hop turf", taking on a "mad quest to explode every cliché about hip-hop identity". The album has been described as a work of pop rap by Caleb Wossen of the Dallas Observer.

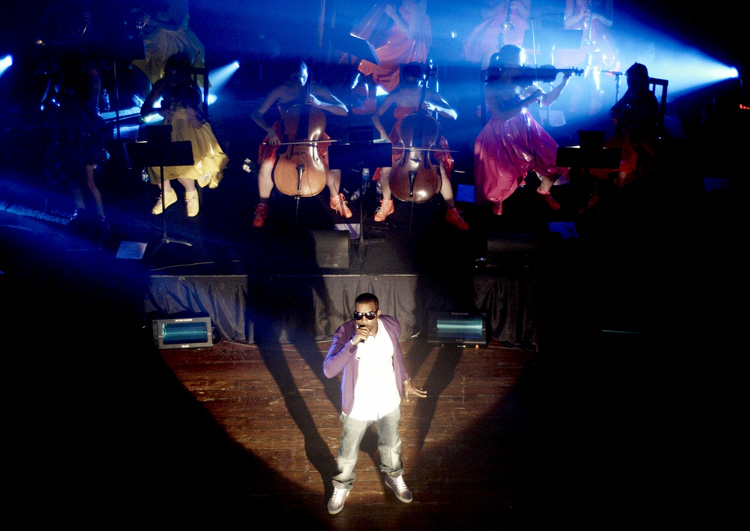
West played with an extensive orchestra on "Bring Me Down", "Gone", and "Celebration".

The first full track on Late Registration, "Heard 'Em Say" exhibits a cascading piano melody provided by excerpts of "Someone That I Used To Love", as performed by Natalie Cole, embellished over tumbling beats, a bass synthesizer, and brief plucks of acoustic guitar. The song's intricately composed outro features the last vocals fading out as various bells and whistles are incorporated, succeeded by the bass synthesizer. "Touch the Sky" stands as the sole song on the album not to feature production by West. The song was produced by fellow Roc-A-Fella producer Just Blaze, who uses a slowed-down sample of Curtis Mayfield's "Move On Up" (1970), filled with Latin horns. "Gold Digger" contains an interpolation of "I Got a Woman" by Charles and a bouncy beat that relies on handclaps, accompanied by scratches from West's touring DJ A-Trak. Towards the end, the song employs vintage synthesizers, which are joined by a honking keyboard. West's production approach is simplified for "Drive Slow", a song that contains a looped sample of the alto sax from Hank Crawford's recording of the 1973 track "Wildflower" by Skylark, before slowing down the sample towards the end, which is antithetical to West's "chipmunk soul"-styled loops.

The interlude "My Way Home" contains a sample of "Home Is Where The Hatred Is" (1971) by Gil Scott-Heron. "Bring Me Down" has more orchestration than any other track on Late Registration, including string arrangements, violins, and cello. The structure of "Addiction" contains synths, congas, strings, and elements of Etta James's "My Funny Valentine" (1937). All the while, West's vocals go through heavy overdubbing. "Diamonds from Sierra Leone" is built around a sample of Shirley Bassey's theme song for the 1971 James Bond film Diamonds Are Forever, layering it with lush instrumental arrangements that feature drums, horns, strings, and a harpsichord.

"Hey Mama"
A 22-second sample of "Hey Mama", which showcases the influence of Fiona Apple on Late Registration. The song also demonstrates Brion's orchestration, featuring Tin Pan Alley-styled drums.

Late Registration's longest track, the seven-minute-long "We Major", implements exuberant, amplified backing vocals and a "splashy disco groove" featuring a bassline, electric piano glissandos, and horns. The melody of "Hey Mama" is laced with a looped "La-la-la" vocal sample from the 1972 track "Today Won't Come Again" by Donal Leace, while its beat contains Tin Pan Alley-styled drums. Additionally, the song features vocoder-processed background vocals, a xylophone solo, and a cascading synth outro. "Celebration" is a cinematic-styled song that includes contributions from a 20-piece orchestra and contains a sample of the KayGees's "Heavenly Dream" (1979). A columnist for The Guardian described the song as evoking "the lavish 1970s psychedelic soul of Rotary Connection".

Some of the most elaborate orchestral arrangement expressed on the album is contained within its final official track "Gone". The composition begins with a vocal sample of "It's Too Late" (1965) by Otis Redding that develops into a two-chord piano ostinato, followed by a simplistic funk beat. As the song progresses, its structure gradually morphs and experiences growing musicality. The composition later adds a string arrangement from ten violinists, four violists, and four cellists, which initially comes in brief staccato bursts and acts as a counterpoint to the rise and fall of West's voice. After its third verse, the song enters an instrumental passage.

== Themes and lyrics ==
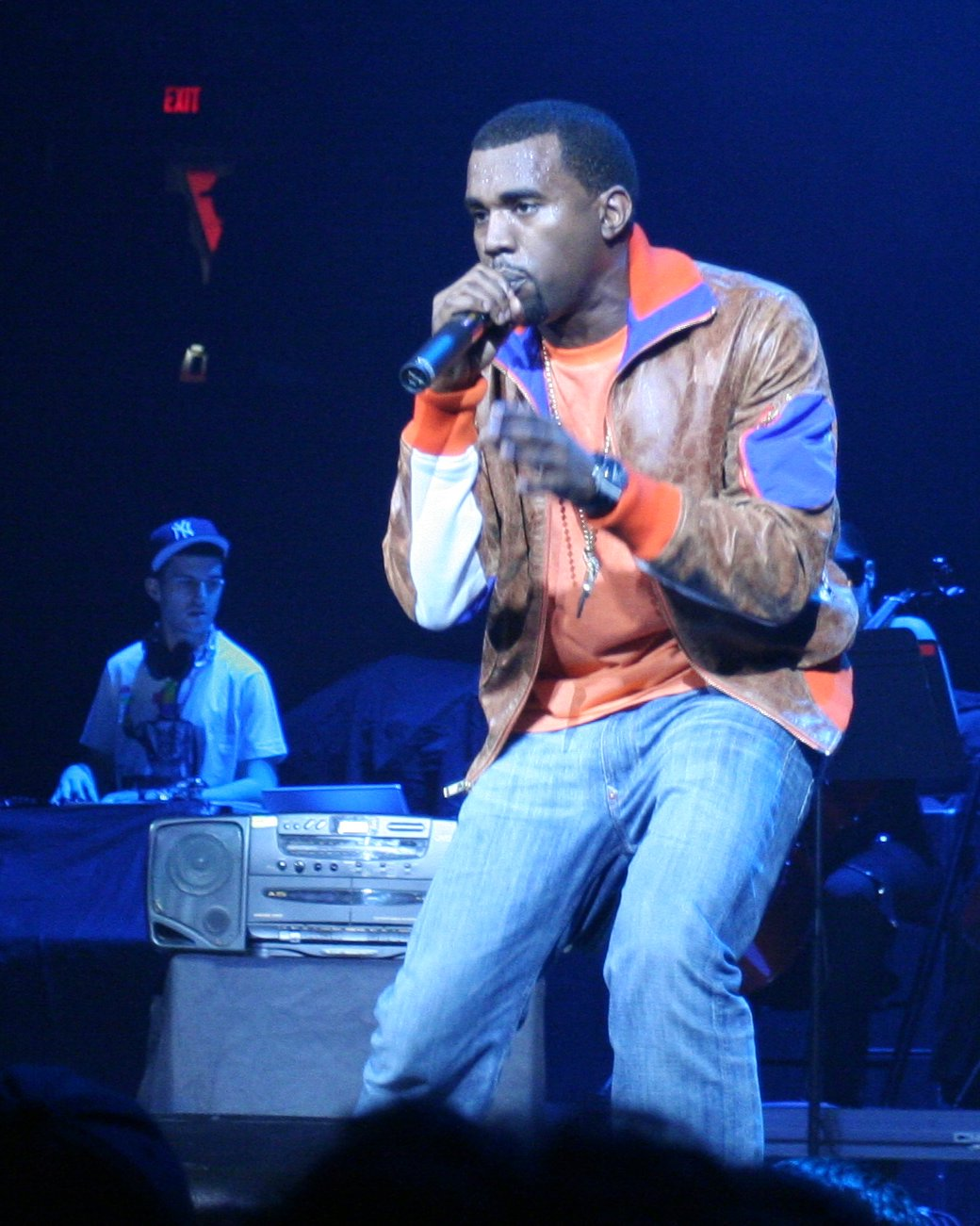
West spoke about the way he planned raps for Late Registration, specifying his aim for them to be understandable.

According to Time magazine's Josh Tyrangiel, Late Registration acts as a demonstration of West's deliberate storytelling mode. West stated that his goal for the album was to touch on topics that people from all walks of life could find relatable, while remaining true to himself, intending his rapping to be "just as ill as Jadakiss and just as understandable as Will Smith". University of North Carolina scholar Kevin Pyon sees Late Registration as a continuation from The College Dropout in demonstrating how West's Christian heritage has informed his relationship to the capitalist market economy. In his analysis, the album reaffirms West's "paradoxical articulation of market and religion—that is, his simultaneous sacred critique and secular valorization of capitalism". The scholar elaborated that West being an authentic Christian "does not replace or merge with his market authenticity as a materialistic rapper but co-exists with it in uneasy tension". West later told Berlin-based artist Tino Sehgal in 2021 that being "under capitalist rule" is "killing us" and declared, "It's time to change that." Robert Christgau summed up West's lyrical persona to be "mammon in practice, Christ in spirit".

"Heard 'Em Say" is told from the perspective of an afflicted, impoverished American quietly lamenting the fallacies of society and questioning the ways of the world around him. According to rap scholar and author Mickey Hess, West's lyrics contemplate "being honest with yourself in a world that is not". On "Touch the Sky", West expresses wonder about his good fortune, while also admitting that his mistakes helped him with songwriting despite trying to put them right. West speaks about women that drain men of the money in their pockets on "Gold Digger", accompanied by Jamie Foxx's ad libbing. However, another story arises within the third verse, which illustrates a formerly destitute black male who abandons a non-gold digger for a white woman. "Drive Slow" acknowledges car culture and features West reflecting on when he was young, poor, and ambitious. In West's description, "Crack Music" delves into "how crack was placed in the black community". West delivers poetry on "Roses", which sees him criticizing the quality of American health care.

The remix of "Diamonds from Sierra Leone" references the deaths of many civilians in diamond mines, as well as reiterating the tension between criticizing consumerism and failing to resist it. Jay-Z appears towards the end of the remix, focusing on his ongoing feud with Dame Dash. The original version is included as a bonus track, featuring West linking Sierra Leone's civil war to the jewellery trade. The extended raps on "We Major" are a spiritual exultation of generational and personal success, followed by Kanye's dedication to his mother Donda West on "Hey Mama". In the latter song, Kanye West recounts his mother being supportive of him even though he was doing the opposite of what she desired. West looks at the idea of abandoning fame on "Gone", thinking about a simpler life.

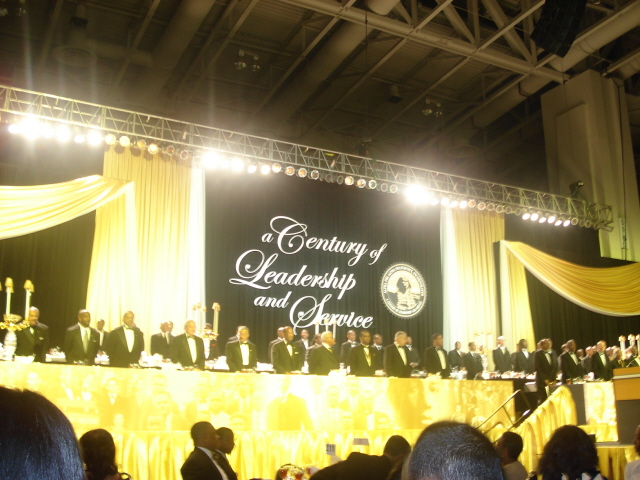
Alpha Phi Alpha board members at a banquet in Washington, D.C., 2006. West critiques institutions such as historically black colleges on the album for not properly helping African Americans.

Similarly to The College Dropout, a series of skits are voiced by comedian DeRay Davis throughout Late Registration. They involve a fictional black fraternity called "Broke Phi Broke", which West's character joins. The members pride themselves in living a life without money or worldly possessions, despite the clear disadvantages such a lifestyle brings. West's character is eventually expelled from the fraternity after the leader discovers that not only has he been making beats for cash on the side, but has also broken some of its rules, such as eating meals everyday, buying new clothes, and taking showers. According to Hess, the skits serve to encapsulate "a contradiction at the core of contemporary American life: the need to belong, to fit in, with your fellow humans versus the Darwinistic mad grab at material things, success in the latter being the very definition of success in our culture". The album's critique of higher education, including historically black colleges and universities, as a useless institution for African Americans is considered by some scholars to be a variation of French sociologist Pierre Bourdieu's theories connecting education to social and cultural reproduction. According to academic journalist Chris Richardson, West advances "a theme critical of institutional education and the broader social distinctions it produces" that is specifically connected to Bourdieu's concept of symbolic violence, which is "defined as the ability to impose meanings while concealing their underlying power relations".

The fraternity theme is revisited towards the end of the album on the UK edition bonus track "We Can Make It Better", featuring guest raps from Talib Kweli, Q-Tip, Common, and Rhymefest over a sped-up sample of "Make It Easy on Yourself", as covered by the Three Degrees. In his lyrics, West addresses a girl as a tour guide through her first day on a college campus while trying to alleviate her fears of dating black men in the aftermath of an abusive relationship. The guest rappers offer observations on urban threats such as exploitative criminals, drug addicts, and dangerous police officers, concluding with Rhymefest's blame of government tactics in terrorizing African Americans. On the Japanese and Australian Tour editions bonus track "Back to Basics", West explores the materialist-conscious rapper contrast.

== Release and promotion ==
Late Registration was originally set to be released on July 12, 2005, but was pushed back to August 16 by West's record labels Roc-A-Fella and Def Jam. The release date was postponed once more to August 30, 2005, for which over 1,600,000 copies were distributed to stores in preparation because the album was expected to be the best-selling record of the year. On the iTunes Store, it became one of the most pre-ordered titles in history up to September 2005.

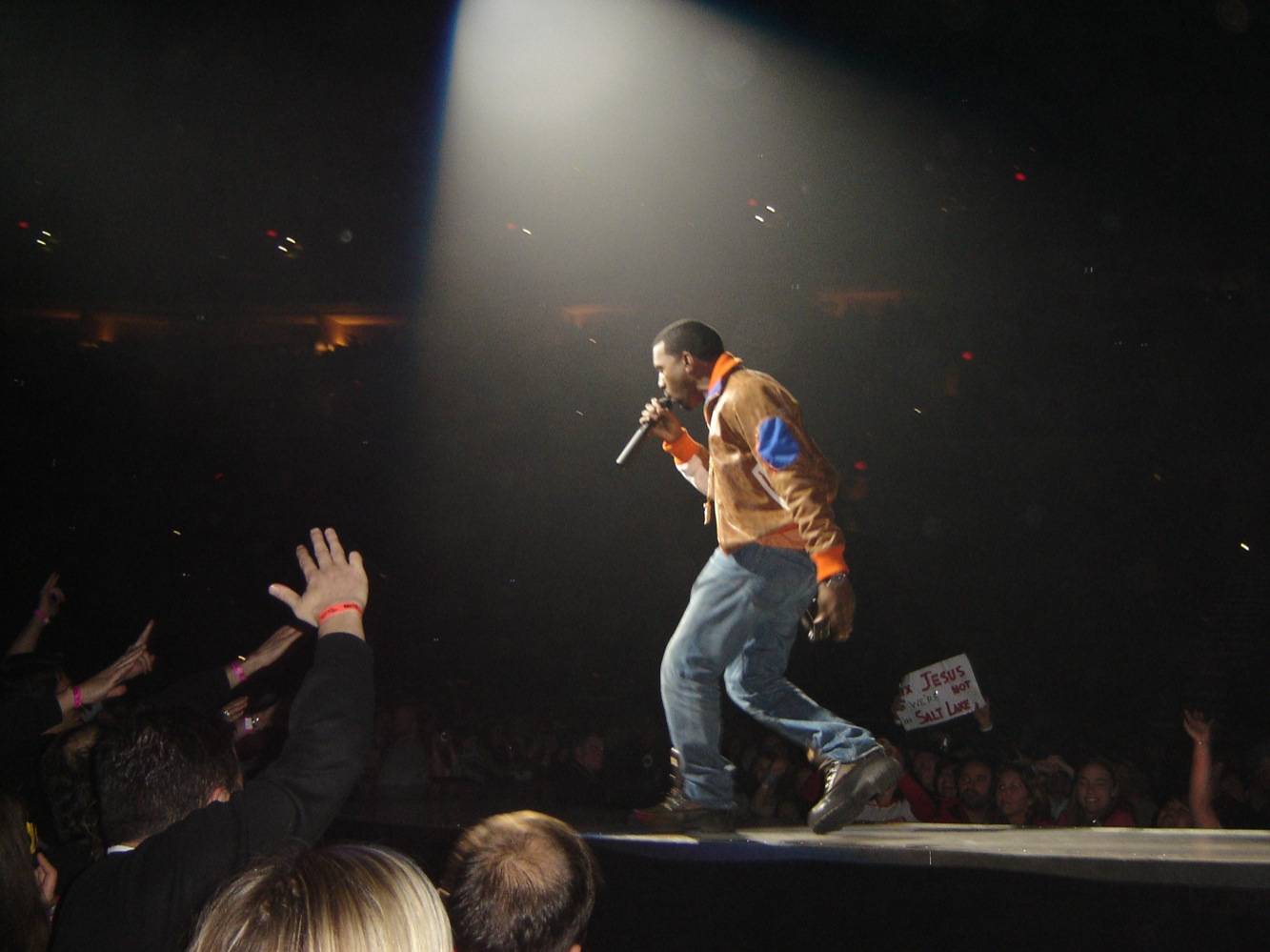
West performing on U2's Vertigo Tour in late 2005

An advertising campaign for Late Registration was directed by Maggie Rogers and Paul Tuersley, while commissioned by Rachel Paley. It was produced by Abby Johnson for Mr & Mrs Smith Design. At the 2006 Cads Music Vision Awards, the campaign received a nomination for Best Music TV Commercial. Late Registration was released for online streaming via AOL Music on August 30, 2005. That same day, West made an in-store appearance at the Tower Records location in New York's Lincoln Center to autograph copies of the album for fans. In September 2005, Def Jam announced tour dates across North America from October to December of that year for West's Touch the Sky Tour, titled after the song. West was supported by Common, Keyshia Cole, and Fantasia on the tour. Common had cancelled his involvement, until he performed with West for the Touch the Sky Tour's kickoff show at the University of Miami Convocation Center on October 11, 2005. After he finished the tour's first leg, West supported Irish rock band U2 for four dates of their Vertigo Tour at the end of 2005. West later performed five UK dates on the Touch the Sky tour in 2006 and during the last show at the NEC Arena in Solihull, two security guards were shot. The rapper was then supposed to support U2's Australian concerts on their Vertigo Tour in March 2006, but the shows were postponed.

=== Artwork and packaging ===
The art direction and music packaging design for Late Registration were both handled by Brooklyn graphic design studio Morning Breath, Inc, while Louis Marino served as creative director. The photography was done by Sarah A. Friedman and Kris Yiengst, the latter of which also did art coordination. Styling and grooming were handled by Charlene Roxborough and Ibn Jasper, respectively, for the company Partos, while Doug Joswick was responsible for package production. Similar to the cover art of The College Dropout, the artwork features West's "Dropout Bear" mascot, showing it at a child's size and stood in the center of two large wooden doors. The mascot has goggle eyes, perky ears, and a collegian outfit, wearing a blazer with a school insignia. In the album booklet, Dropout Bear appears in the university, sitting alone in classrooms and reads books before exiting. The booklet includes a banner that reads Tardus Subcriptio, translated as Late Registration. West's vision for the style of the pictures was inspired by the works of American satirical painter John Currin, one of his favorite artists.

=== Singles ===
In a preview of Late Registration on April 20, 2005, West appeared on New York radio station Hot 97 and premiered "Diamonds from Sierra Leone". The following month, the song was serviced to US mainstream radio stations as the album's lead single by Roc-A-Fella and Def Jam. It charted at number 43 on the US Billboard Hot 100, alongside reaching number eight on the UK Singles Chart. "Diamonds from Sierra Leone" has been certified platinum in the US by the RIAA for amassing 1,000,000 certified units, while the BPI has awarded it with a silver certification for sales of 200,000 units. An accompanying music video was debuted on June 15, 2005, in which rough scenes of young children mining for diamonds are juxtaposed with shots of West rapping through the streets of Prague. On July 5, "Gold Digger" was released to US rhythmic contemporary radio stations as the second single from Late Registration, through West's labels. The song was a smash hit, topping the Hot 100, ARIA Singles Chart, and NZ Singles Chart. It experienced similar success on the UK Singles Chart, peaking at the second position. In September 2020, "Gold Digger" received an octuple platinum certification from the RIAA for pushing 8,000,000 certified units in the US, standing as one of the best-selling singles digitally in the country. The song was later certified triple platinum by the BPI for selling 1,800,000 units in the UK.

On October 24, 2005, "Heard 'Em Say" was issued on a 12" vinyl as the album's third single by Roc-A-Fella and Def Jam. The song peaked at numbers 26 and 22 on the Billboard Hot 100 and UK Singles Chart, respectively. It has been awarded a platinum certification by the RIAA for shelving 1,000,000 certified units in the US. The song's first music video depicts a Christmas world in Macy's flagship New York store, while the second one utilizes animation and shows West taking on the role of a cab driver in an imaginary city. "Touch the Sky" was released on a digital EP in the UK as the fourth single from Late Registration on January 1, 2006, through West's labels. The song reached number 42 on the Hot 100, while it debuted at number six on the UK Singles Chart. "Touch the Sky" has been certified platinum by both the RIAA and BPI in the US and UK, respectively, having amassed 1,000,000 certified units in the former country and pushed 600,000 units in the latter. The song's music video was debuted in February 2006 and features West portraying the character "Evel Kanyevel", preparing to travel across the Grand Canyon in homage to Evel Knievel's unsuccessful 1974 jump across the Snake River Canyon. On June 6, "Drive Slow" was released on a 12" vinyl as the album's fifth and final single by Roc-A-Fella and Def Jam. The song was later certified gold by the RIAA for shelving 500,000 certified units in the US. An accompanying music video was filmed, featuring cameos from Wall and fellow rapper T.I.

== Critical reception ==
Late Registration ratings
Aggregate scores
Source	Rating
Metacritic	85/100
Review scores
Source	Rating
AllMusic	5/5 stars
Blender	4/5 stars
Entertainment Weekly	B+
The Guardian	5/5 stars
Los Angeles Times	4/4 stars
NME	8/10
Pitchfork	9.5/10
Rolling Stone	5/5 stars
Spin	B+
USA Today	4/4 stars

Late Registration was met with widespread critical acclaim. According to the review aggregator Metacritic, Late Registration received "universal acclaim" based on a weighted average score of 85 out of 100 from 31 critic scores. Reviewers generally regarded it as far superior to The College Dropout.

Writing in Rolling Stone, Sheffield deemed Late Registration "an undeniable triumph" throughout, seeing it as expansive enough to make "the debut sound like a rough draft" and adding that West proves he is a real rapper. The Guardian lead critic Alexis Petridis highlighted West's topicality and subversive studio production on the album; he noticed the indication of "an artist effortlessly outstripping his peers: more ideas, better lyrics, bigger hooks, greater depth". Andy Kellman from AllMusic said the rapper "can be tremendous" as a songwriter and noted his production style had gone from unrefined and erratic-tempo samples to "a more traditionally musical touch" contributed by Brion. Sean Fennessey of Pitchfork felt West provided a worthy successor to The College Dropout with an "expansive, imperfect masterpiece" that draws on his enthusiastic, ambitious, and scattered personality.

Late Registration was hailed by some journalists as a pivotal release in hip-hop. Billboard senior editor Gail Mitchell said that with its combination of socially conscious hip-hop, club, and personal reflections, the album "represents a watershed moment in rap music history", while Kitty Empire from The Observer viewed it as an important milestone for the genre, declaring West "the Brian Wilson of hip-hop" and observing that he "plays up the struggle between conscience and covetousness, the pop mainstream", and what is achievable within hip-hop's traditional boundaries. Similarly, Steve Yates from the same publication compared West's aspirations in working with Brion to how Stevie Wonder collaborated in his classic 1970s period, adding that by being "creative, intelligent, funny and daring" he is the only act besides rap group Outkast "to walk the tightrope between pop sensibility, conscious rap and the outright nihilism of your common-or-garden [variety] gangsta". In the Los Angeles Times, Robert Hilburn compared West's dignified execution of pop crossover to that of the Beatles, Johnny Cash, and Bob Marley. Robert Christgau, writing in The Village Voice, praised the lyrical and musical "exquisite details" of the album, saying that West may be arrogant, "only that's not why he always samples". He concluded that West is as good as he believes himself, calling the rapper "a backpacker at heart who, like many brilliant nerds before him, has accrued precious metal by following his dream".

Some reviewers were more qualified in their praise. In The A.V. Club, Nathan Rabin found Late Registration as ambitious as The College Dropout, albeit "less successful" because of melodramatic lyricism and symphony music without a "strong narrative" to hold the songs together; he finalized that the album "plays like a brilliant first draft, flawed and uneven, but radiating humor and heart". The New York Times critic Jon Pareles believed West's elevated status undermined the underdog quality that had accentuated his debut, writing that "for much of Late Registration, the striver has turned into a hip-hop V.I.P.", with his "cool arrogance" being prominent on the songs. Hattie Collins of NME was highly impressed by the beats in the music, which she called "pure cranium-crushing boom bap at its best", but lamented the lack of "rubbish lyrics" and clumsy charm that made The College Dropout appeal to West's hardcore fans. In the eyes of Spin magazine's Jon Caramanica, the improved versatility and eccentricity of West's flow still "pales in comparison to his sonic ambition".

=== Rankings ===
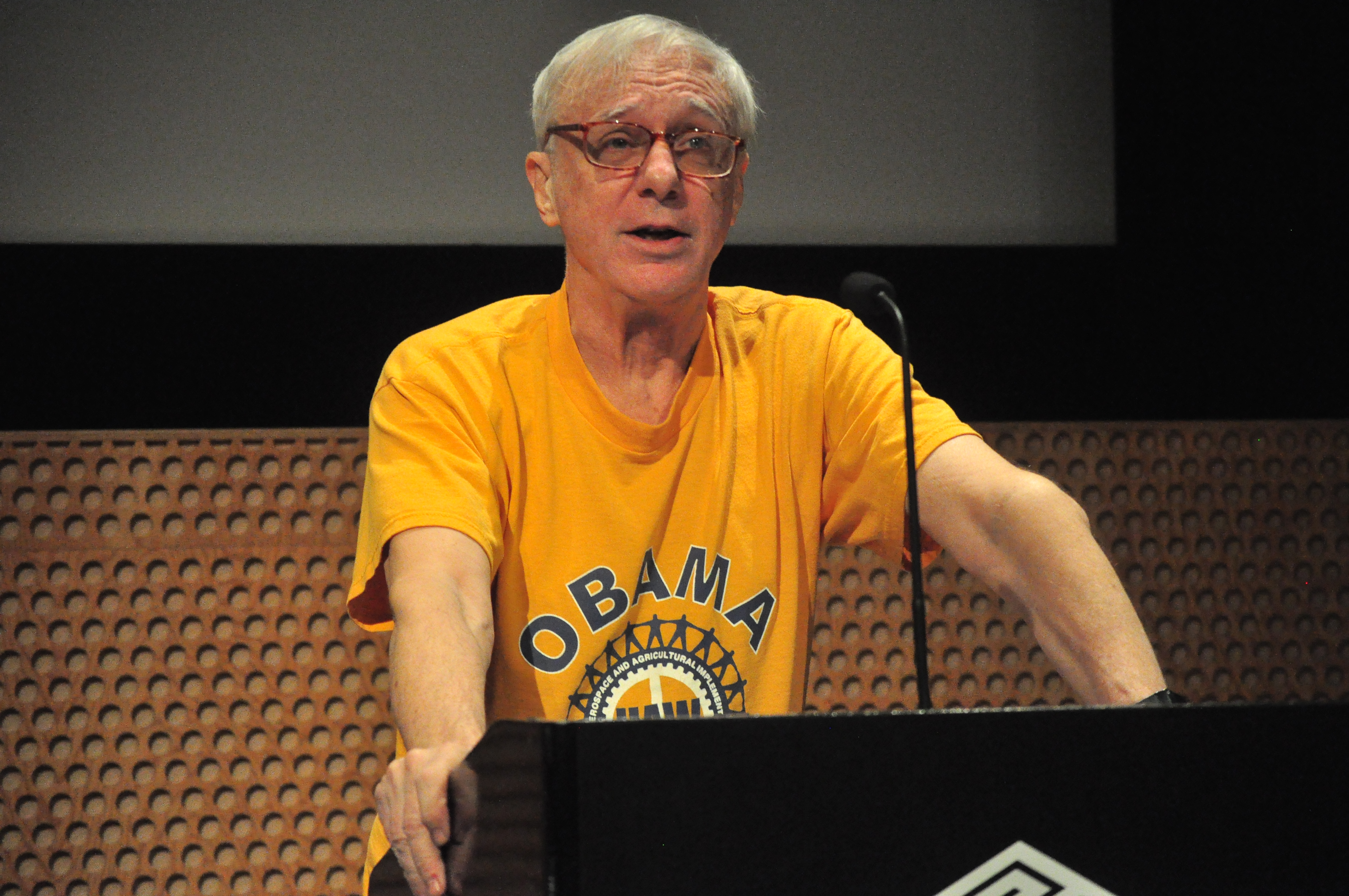
Robert Christgau (pictured in 2014) supervised the 2005 Pazz & Jop critics poll, which Late Registration won. He also named it the best album of the year on his own list.

Late Registration appeared on year-end best album lists for 2005 by numerous publications, including being named the best album of the year by Spin, Time, and USA Today. Rolling Stone also gave the album this accolade, with the staff hailing it as a "sweepingly generous, absurdly virtuosic hip-hop classic". In The Village Voice's 2005 Pazz & Jop nationwide poll of 795 popular music critics, Late Registration finished at number one with 2,525 points. It scored a 107-point lead, standing as the narrowest margin in the poll's history. Christgau, the poll's supervisor, also ranked Late Registration first on his own list, and assigned it an "A+" grade in his "Consumer Guide" column. On the Washington City Paper's list of the top 20 favourite albums of 2005 calculated from points assigned by the magazine's music writers, the album finished at number four with 43 points, becoming one of the five albums to score over 40 that year. Late Registration was West's second consecutive album to be rated "XXL" by XXL, the magazine's highest rank, which had been awarded to only 16 other hip-hop albums by 2005.

MSN Music selected the album as the seventh best album of the 2000s decade; the staff praised West's work with Brion for expanding his genre range. PopMatters ranked Late Registration as the 15th best album of the 2000s, while Pitchfork named it the decade's 18th best album. Observer Music Monthly listed the album as the 19th best of the decade, and the staff noted that West reached his ambition to be "bigger than hip-hop". Consequence named Late Registration the 26th best album of the 2000s, whereas La Vanguardia picked it as the 36th best of the decade. The album finished at number 40 on Rolling Stone's list of the best albums of the 2000s, with the staff highlighting West's decision to work with Brion.

In 2012, Rolling Stone placed Late Registration at number 118 on their revised list of "The 500 Greatest Albums of All Time". The album was the highest entry among both recent albums and the three West releases to appear on the list. On a 2013 list published by Vibe of the 50 best albums since 1993, it was positioned 16th. In 2012, Late Registration was placed at number 100 on Spin's list of the 125 best albums of the past 25 years. Three years later, the magazine ranked the album at number 104 on its list of the 300 best albums of the past 30 years. Late Registration was later listed at number 117 on Rolling Stone's 2020 edition of the 500 Greatest Albums of All Time.

Select rankings of Late Registration
Publication	List	Rank	Ref.
Complex	The 100 Best Albums of the Complex Decade (2002–2012)	93	
Consequence	The Top 100 Albums of the 2000s	26	
Pitchfork	Top 50 Albums of 2005	2	
Pitchfork	The 200 Best Albums of the 2000s	18	
Rolling Stone	Top 50 Records of 2005	1	
Rolling Stone	100 Best Albums of the 2000s	40	
Rolling Stone	500 Greatest Albums of All Time (2012)	118	
Rolling Stone	500 Greatest Albums of All Time (2020)	117	
Rolling Stone	The 200 Greatest Hip-Hop Albums of All Time	41	
Spin	The 40 Best Albums of 2005	1	
Spin	The 300 Best Albums of the Past 30 Years (1985–2014)	104	
Time	Best Albums of 2005	1	
USA Today	Best Albums of 2005	1	
The Village Voice	The 2005 Pazz & Jop Critics Poll	1	
Washington City Paper	Music Writers' Top 20 Favourite Albums of 2005	4	
The Wire	Top 50 Records of 2005	25	

=== Industry awards ===
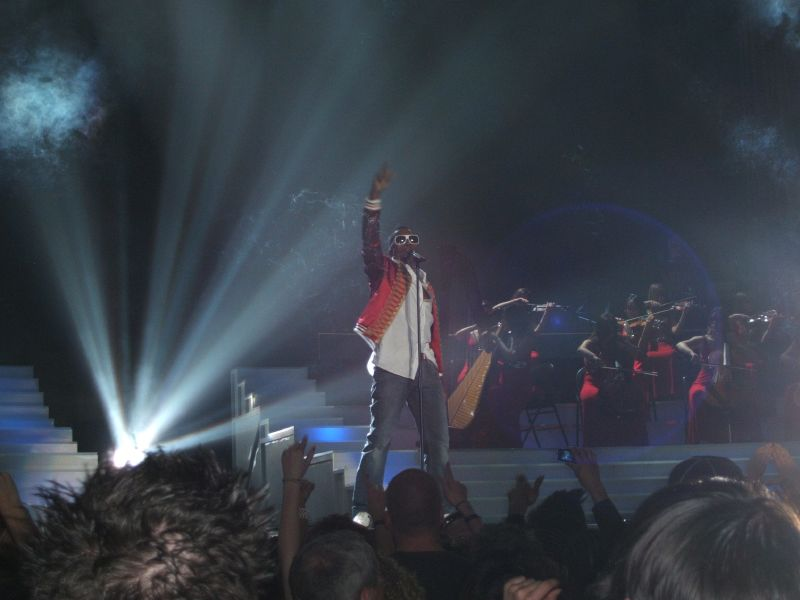
West performing at the 2006 Brit Awards, where he received a nomination for International Album.

Late Registration was a contender for numerous industry awards. In December 2005, prior to the nominations being announced for the 2006 Grammy Awards, West complained that he would have a problem with not winning the Album of the Year award. Late Registration received a nomination for the award at the ceremony, and West recalled himself and Brion saying in the studio, "We're making the Album of the Year!" At the 2006 Grammys, the album won the award of Best Rap Album, becoming West's second consecutive album to do so and he delivered an acceptance speech that night. "Gold Digger" and "Diamonds From Sierra Leone" were winners of the awards for Best Rap Solo Performance and Best Rap Song, respectively, at the same ceremony, while the former was also nominated for Record of the Year. West's nominations for the album were six of the eight awards that he contended for at the 2006 Grammys, tying with Mariah Carey and John Legend for the show's most nominations. Despite West having stating he would have a problem with not winning, he was happy with eight nominations. However, Late Registration won the Best Album award at the 2006 MP3.com Awards.

Awards and nominations for Late Registration
Year	Organization	Award	Result	Ref.
2005	Best Art Vinyl Awards	Best Art Vinyl	Nominated	
2005	HipHopDX Awards	Album of the Year	Nominated	
2005	Vibe Awards	Album of the Year	Nominated	
2006	BET Hip Hop Awards	Hip Hop CD of the Year	Nominated	
2006	Billboard R&B/Hip-Hop Awards	Top R&B/Hip-Hop Album	Nominated	
2006	Billboard R&B/Hip-Hop Awards	Top Rap Album	Won	
2006	Brit Awards	International Album	Nominated	
2006	Danish Music Awards	International Album of the Year	Nominated	
2006	Grammy Awards	Best Rap Album	Won	
2006	Grammy Awards	Album of the Year	Nominated	
2006	Hungarian Music Awards	Best Foreign Rap or Hip-Hop Album of the Year	Won	
2006	MP3.com Awards	Best Album	Won	
2006	NAACP Image Awards	Outstanding Album	Nominated	
2006	TEC Awards	Record Production/Album	Nominated	

== Commercial performance ==
In its first week of release, Late Registration debuted at number one on the US Billboard 200 with first week sales of 860,000 copies, selling over 600,000 more copies than Tony Yayo's album Thoughts of a Predicate Felon at number two. This stood as West's first chart-topping album in the United States and gave him first-week sales nearly double those of The College Dropout. The album had the highest-selling first week sales in the US for two years, until West's next album Graduation suprassed it in September 2007 by selling 957,000 copies. The former's first-week sales also ranked as the seventh largest for a rap album up to March 3, 2020. In Late Registration's second week, it remained atop the Billboard 200 and sold an additional 283,000 copies, resulting in more than 1,140,000 copies sold within the first two weeks on the chart. In early 2006, the Recording Industry Association of America (RIAA) awarded the album a triple platinum certification, indicating sales of 3,000,000 copies in the US. In June 2013, Late Registration reached 3,100,000 copies sold in the US. On July 21, 2022, it was certified five-times platinum by the RIAA for sales of 5,000,000 album-equivalent units in the country.

Late Registration also debuted at number one on the Canadian Albums Chart. On February 14, 2006, it was certified double platinum by Music Canada (MC) for shipments of 200,000 copies in Canada. In the United Kingdom, the album entered the UK Albums Chart at number two for the issue date of September 5, 2005, being prevented from topping the chart by McFly's album Wonderland. The former was certified triple platinum by the British Phonographic Industry (BPI) for sales of 900,000 units in the UK on March 12, 2022. As of May 2018, Late Registration is the 12th highest-selling rap album in the UK in the 21st century. By November of that year, the album had sold 852,000 copies in the UK, ranking as West's highest selling album in the country. Late Registration reached numbers two and three on the Irish Albums Chart and Scottish Albums Chart, respectively, while it received a double platinum certification from the Irish Recorded Music Association (IRMA) by the end of 2005 for pushing 30,000 units in Ireland. The album also charted within the top 10 in Norway, Greece, Switzerland, and Japan, as well as entering the European Top 100 Albums chart at number six. In 2021, Vibe reported that Late Registration became one of the rap albums released before 2010 to have been streamed one billion times through Spotify.

== Legacy ==
I hate the way they portray us in the media. If you see a Black family, it says, "They're looting." You see a white family, it says, "They're looking for food.' ... George Bush doesn't care about Black people.

— Kanye West (A Concert for Hurricane Relief, 2005)

With the album's commercial success, West established himself as a recording artist in his own right outside of his earlier success with hip-hop productions for other rappers. By surpassing the sales and acclaim of The College Dropout, Late Registration proved that "the Kanye West experiment was no longer an experiment, it was a business model", according to author Shea Serrano. He explained, "It helped revitalize sampling soul music, it stitched together pop music themes generally attributable to the easily ignorable 'conscious rap' quadrant ('Gold Digger' is secretly a clever examination of the effects money has on relationships), and it created a precedent for the larger-scale gazing he'd go on to do. Rap followed along right behind him." As The Ringer's Logan Murdock chronicles, Late Registration proved his unprecedented artistry and relentless ambition with "a story to tell, an underdog tale that the masses related to", particularly the black community. The journalist relates his own experience connecting with the music, recalling having been a fan of West at 12 years old in Oakland, California, recognizing "the same struggles [he] spoke about plaguing my own environment. Like West, I had educated parents and a stable home life, but was aware of the world around me. Like West, I struggled to get acceptance, living a double life."

Released in the wake of Hurricane Katrina's destructive landfall on the US Gulf Coast, Late Registration was followed a few days later by West's appearance on the live telethon A Concert for Hurricane Relief. In a segment alongside actor Mike Myers, he made harsh remarks that were critical of the US government's response to the storm, and of the media for lacking empathy toward the disproportionately impacted black people. According to Murdock, West's remarks were in line with both the criticism then-President George W. Bush would receive for his handling of Hurricane Katrina and "with the defiance that Late Registration displayed" through its insight into the "systematic racism faced by those in the water". A few weeks later, West performed tracks from the album at Abbey Road Studios in London for a live record entitled Late Orchestration, which was released in April 2006 and also includes accompanying music videos on the home video edition.

In retrospect, Highsnobiety writer Shahzaib Hussain recognized Late Registration in West's opening trilogy of highly successful albums that "cemented his role as a progressive rap progenitor". Similarly, the staff of XXL felt satisfied with the album as the second work of West's education-themed trilogy and noted that a sophomore slump was avoided. The staff commented that it "relied on his production savvy to craft some of the most stellar beats of his career", which they felt were equaled by West's lyricism. According to Jay Willis of GQ, Late Registration marked the last great album by "the old Kanye"; he remembered it being the soundtrack to many of his life activities.

== Track listing ==
Late Registration standard edition
No.	Title	Writer(s)	Producer(s)	Length
1.	"Wake Up Mr. West"	Michael Masser; Gerry Goffin		0:41
2.	"Heard 'Em Say" (featuring Adam Levine)	Kanye West; Adam Levine; Masser; Goffin	West; Jon Brion	3:23
3.	"Touch the Sky" (featuring Lupe Fiasco)	West; Justin Smith; Wasalu Jaco; Curtis Mayfield	Just Blaze	3:56
4.	"Gold Digger" (featuring Jamie Foxx)	West; Ray Charles; Renald Richard	West; Brion	3:27
5.	"Skit No. 1"			0:33
6.	"Drive Slow" (featuring Paul Wall and GLC)	West; Paul Slayton; Leonard Harris	West	4:32
7.	"My Way Home" (performed by Common)	West; Lonnie Lynn; Gil Scott-Heron	West	1:43
8.	"Crack Music" (featuring The Game)	West; Willard Meeks; Jayceon Taylor	West; Brion	4:31
9.	"Roses"	West; Bill Withers	West; Brion	4:05
10.	"Bring Me Down" (featuring Brandy)	West; Antony Williams	West; Brion	3:19
11.	"Addiction"	West; Richard Rodgers; Lorenz Hart	West; Brion	4:27
12.	"Skit No. 2"			0:31
13.	"Diamonds from Sierra Leone (Remix)" (featuring Jay-Z)	West; Devon Harris; John Barry; Don Black	West; Devo Springsteen; Brion	3:53
14.	"We Major" (featuring Nas and Really Doe)	West; Warren Trotter; Nasir Jones; Williams; Warryn "Baby Dubb" Campbell; Russell Simmons; Larry Smith; Maureen Reid	West; Baby Dubb; Brion	7:28
15.	"Skit No. 3"			0:24
16.	"Hey Mama"	West; Donal Leace	West; Brion	5:05
17.	"Celebration"	West	West; Brion	3:18
18.	"Skit No. 4"			1:18
19.	"Gone" (featuring Consequence and Cam'ron)	West; Dexter Mills; Cameron Giles; Chuck Willis	West	5:33
20.	"Diamonds from Sierra Leone" (bonus track)	West; Harris; Barry; Black	West; Devo Springsteen; Brion	3:58
21.	"Late" (hidden track)	West; George Kerr; Sylvia Robinson	West	3:50
Total length:				70:25

UK edition
No.	Title	Writer(s)	Producer(s)	Length
21.	"We Can Make It Better" (featuring Talib Kweli, Q-Tip, Common and Rhymefest)	West; Lynn; Kamaal Fareed; Talib Kweli Greene; Che Smith; Burt Bacharach; Hal David	West; Brion	3:52
22.	"Late" (hidden track)	West; Kerr; Robinson	West	3:50
Total length:				74:17

Japanese and Australian Tour editions
No.	Title	Writer(s)	Producer(s)	Length
21.	"Back to Basics" (with Common)	West; Lynn; Duke Ellington; Irving Mills; Manny Kurt	West	1:39
22.	"We Can Make It Better" (featuring Talib Kweli, Q-Tip, Common and Rhymefest)	West; Lynn; Fareed; Greene; Smith; Bacharach; David	West; Brion	3:52
23.	"Late" (hidden track)	West; Kerr; Robinson	West	3:50
Total length:				75:56

Sample credits

- "Wake Up Mr. West" and "Heard 'Em Say" both contain excerpts of "Someone That I Used to Love" as performed by Natalie Cole.
- "Touch the Sky" contains samples of "Move On Up" as performed by Curtis Mayfield.
- "Gold Digger" contains samples of "I Got a Woman" as performed by Ray Charles.
- "Drive Slow" contains samples of "Wildflower" as performed by Hank Crawford.
- "My Way Home" contains samples of "Home Is Where The Hatred Is" as performed by Gil Scott-Heron.
- "Crack Music" contains samples of "Since You Came in My Life" as performed by New York Community Choir and "It's Your Thing" as performed by Cold Grits.
- "Roses" contains samples of "Rosie" as performed by Bill Withers.
- "Addiction" contains elements of "My Funny Valentine" as performed by Etta James.
- "Diamonds from Sierra Leone" contains samples of "Diamonds Are Forever" as performed by Shirley Bassey.
- "We Major" contains samples of "Action" as performed by Orange Krush.
- "Hey Mama" contains samples of "Today Won't Come Again" as performed by Donal Leace.
- "Celebration" contains samples of "Heavenly Dream" as performed by The Kay-Gees.
- "Gone" contains samples of "It's Too Late" as performed by Otis Redding.
- "Late" contains samples of "I'll Erase Away Your Pain" by The Whatnauts.
- "We Can Make It Better" contains a sample of "Make It Easy on Yourself" as performed by The Three Degrees.

== Personnel ==
Credits are adapted from the album's liner notes.

=== Musicians ===
- Eric Gorfain – violin (tracks 10, 17, 19)
- Daphne Chen – violin (tracks 10, 17, 19)
- Victoria Lanier – violin (tracks 10, 17, 19)
- Julie Rogers – violin (tracks 10, 17, 19)
- Alyssa Park – violin (tracks 10, 17, 19)
- Audrey Solomon – violin (tracks 10, 17, 19)
- Terry Glenny – violin (tracks 10, 17, 19)
- Susan Chatman – violin (tracks 10, 17, 19)
- Marisa Kuney – violin (tracks 10, 17, 19)
- Amy Wickman – violin (tracks 10, 17, 19)
- Marda Todd – viola (tracks 10, 17, 19)
- Piotr Jandule – viola (tracks 10, 17, 19)
- Tom Tally – viola (tracks 10, 17, 19)
- David Sage – viola (tracks 10, 17, 19)
- Richard Dodd – cello (tracks 10, 17, 19)
- Matt Cooker – cello (tracks 10, 17, 19)
- Armen Ksadjikian – cello (tracks 10, 17, 19)
- Victor Lawrence – cello (tracks 10, 17, 19)
- Jason Torreano – contrabass (tracks 10, 17)
- Francis Senger – contrabass (tracks 10, 17)
- Denise Briese – contrabass (tracks 10, 17)
- Gary Grant – trumpet, flugelhorn (tracks 10, 17)
- Dan Fornero – trumpet, flugelhorn (tracks 10, 17)
- Andrew Martin – trombone (tracks 10, 17)
- Stephen Holtman – trombone (tracks 10, 17)
- Bruce Otto – bass trombone (tracks 10, 17)
- Rick Todd – French horn (tracks 10, 17)
- Brad Warnaar – French horn (tracks 10, 17)
- Ervin "EP" Pope – keyboards (tracks 9, 17)
- Keenan "Keynote" Holloway – bass (tracks 9, 17)
- Tom Craskey – keyboards (tracks 13, 20)
- Dave Tozer – guitar (tracks 13, 20)
- Michel Gondry – live drums (tracks 13, 20)
- A-Trak – scratches (track 4)
- Tony "Penafire" Williams – additional vocals (tracks 2, 6, 8, 9, 14)
- John Legend – additional vocals (tracks 16, 17)
- DeRay Davis – additional vocals (track 1)
- Plain Pat – additional vocals (track 4)
- Don C. – additional vocals (track 4)
- Keyshia Cole – additional vocals (track 8)
- Charlie Wilson – additional vocals (track 8)
- Patti LaBelle – additional vocals (track 9) (Note: Patti LaBelle's vocals on the track are uncredited.)
- Strings – additional vocals (track 11)

=== Production ===
- Anthony Kilhoffer – recording (tracks 3, 4, 6, 8–14, 16, 17, 19, 20)
- Andrew Dawson – recording (tracks 2–4, 6–8, 16, 17, 21), mixing (tracks 8, 16, 17, 19)
- Tom Biller – recording (tracks 2, 4, 11–14, 16, 17), strings recording (tracks 10, 17, 19, 20)
- Brian Sumner – recording (tracks 8, 9, 21)
- Richard Reitz – recording (track 6)
- Mike Dean – mixing (tracks 2–4, 6, 7)
- Craig Bauer – mixing (tracks 9–12)
- Manny Marroquin – mixing (tracks 13, 20)
- Nate Connelly – assistant engineering (tracks 2–4, 6, 9, 10, 14, 21)
- Mike Mo – assistant engineering (tracks 2–4, 6, 10, 14)
- Matt Green – assistant engineering (tracks 3, 4, 8, 10, 16, 17)
- Taylor Dow – assistant engineering (tracks 2, 7, 16, 17, 19)
- James Auwarter – assistant engineering (tracks 9–12)
- Ryan Neuschafer – assistant engineering (tracks 9–12)
- Jon Brion – string arrangement (tracks 10, 17, 19), brass arrangement (tracks 10, 17)
- Eric Gorfain – strings orchestration (tracks 10, 17, 19)
- Vlado Meller – mastering

=== Design ===
- Louis Marino – creative direction
- Morning Breath, Inc. – art direction, design
- Sarah A. Friedman – photography
- Kris Yiengst – photography, art coordination
- Charlene Roxborough – styling
- Ibn Jasper – grooming

== Charts ==
=== Weekly charts ===
Chart performance for Late Registration
Chart (2005)	Peak position
Australian Albums (ARIA)	14
Australian Urban Albums (ARIA)	3
Austrian Albums (Ö3 Austria)	53
Belgian Albums (Ultratop Flanders)	43
Canadian Albums (Billboard)	1
Danish Albums (Hitlisten)	11
Dutch Albums (Album Top 100)	24
European Albums (Billboard)	6
Finnish Albums (Suomen virallinen lista)	18
French Albums (SNEP)	36
German Albums (Offizielle Top 100)	14
Greek Albums (IFPI)	7
Irish Albums (IRMA)	2
Italian Albums (FIMI)	75
Japanese Albums (Oricon)	10
New Zealand Albums (RMNZ)	11
Norwegian Albums (VG-lista)	4
Scottish Albums (Official Charts)	3
Swedish Albums (Sverigetopplistan)	11
Swiss Albums (Schweizer Hitparade)	9
Taiwanese Albums (Five Music)	4
UK Albums (Official Charts)	2
UK R&B Albums (Official Charts)	1
US Billboard 200	1
US Top R&B/Hip-Hop Albums (Billboard)	1

Weekly chart performance
Chart (2024)	Peak position
Portuguese Albums (AFP)	156

Weekly chart performance
Chart (2026)	Peak position
Croatian International Albums (HDU)	20

=== Year-end charts ===
Year-end chart performance
Chart (2005)	Position
Australian Albums (ARIA)	83
UK Albums (OCC)	43
US Billboard 200	21
US Top R&B/Hip-Hop Albums (Billboard)	11
Worldwide Charts (IFPI)	14

Year-end chart performance
Chart (2006)	Position
Australian Albums (ARIA)	89
UK Albums (OCC)	93
US Billboard 200	71
US Top R&B/Hip-Hop Albums (Billboard)	38

Year-end chart performance
Chart (2007)	Position
Australian Urban Albums (ARIA)	37

=== Decade-end charts ===
Decade-end chart performance
Chart (2000–2009)	Position
US Billboard 200	156

== Certifications ==
Certifications and sales
Region	Certification	Certified units/sales
Australia (ARIA)	Platinum	70,000^{^}
Canada (Music Canada)	2× Platinum	200,000^{^}
Denmark (IFPI Danmark)	2× Platinum	40,000^{‡}
Ireland (IRMA)	2× Platinum	30,000^{^}
Italy (FIMI) sales + streams since 2009	Gold	25,000^{‡}
Japan (RIAJ)	Gold	100,000^{^}
New Zealand (RMNZ)	3× Platinum	45,000^{‡}
United Kingdom (BPI)	3× Platinum	900,000^{‡}
United States (RIAA)	5× Platinum	5,000,000^{‡}
Summaries
Europe (IFPI)	Platinum	1,000,000^{*}
^{*} Sales figures based on certification alone.^{^} Shipments figures based on certification alone.^{‡} Sales+streaming figures based on certification alone.

== See also ==
- 2005 in hip-hop
- List of most expensive albums
- List of albums containing a hidden track
- List of best-selling albums in the United States of the Nielsen SoundScan era
- List of number-one albums of 2005 (Canada)
- List of UK top-ten albums in 2005
- List of UK R&B Albums Chart number ones of 2005
- List of Billboard 200 number-one albums of 2005
- List of number-one rap albums of 2005 (U.S.)
- List of Billboard number-one R&B albums of 2005

== Notes and references ==
Notes

Citations

=== Sources ===
- Brown, Jake (2006). Kanye West in the Studio: Beats Down! Money Up! (2000–2006). Colossus Books. ISBN 0-9767735-6-2.
- Hess, Mickey (2007). Icons of Hip Hop: An Encyclopedia of the Movement, Music, and Culture. Greenwood Publishing Group. ISBN 978-0-313-33904-2.
- Beaumont, Mark (2015). Kanye West: God & Monster. Overlook Omnibus. ISBN 9781783233946 – via Google Books.
