= Hey Mama (Kanye West song) =

Song by Kanye West

from the album Late Registration
- Released: August 30, 2005
- Recorded: 2000–2005
- Studio: The Record Plant (Hollywood); Sony Music (New York City); Grandmaster Recording (Hollywood)
- Genre: Hip-hop soul; R&B; neo-soul; ballad
- Length: 5:05
- Label: Roc-A-Fella; Def Jam
- Songwriters: Kanye West; Donal Leace
- Producers: Kanye West; Jon Brion

"Hey Mama" is a song by American rapper Kanye West from his second studio album, Late Registration (2005). The song includes additional vocals from John Legend. West composed the song in 2000, specifically intending for it to be included on the album. The song was produced by West and Jon Brion. A ballad, it contains a sample of Donal Leace's "Today Won't Come Again". In the lyrics of the song, Kanye pays tribute to his mother, Donda West.

"Hey Mama" received generally positive reviews from music critics, who mostly praised its musical style. A few commended the sample of "Today Won't Come Again", though critical commentary towards the concept was somewhat mixed. The song reached numbers 9 and 64 on the US Billboard Bubbling Under R&B/Hip-Hop Singles and Hot Canadian Digital Singles charts in 2007 and 2008, respectively. It has since been certified gold in the United States by the Recording Industry Association of America (RIAA). Kanye West performed the song in memory of Donda throughout his Glow in the Dark Tour (2008), while he also sang it as a tribute to her at the 50th Annual Grammy Awards that year.

== Background ==
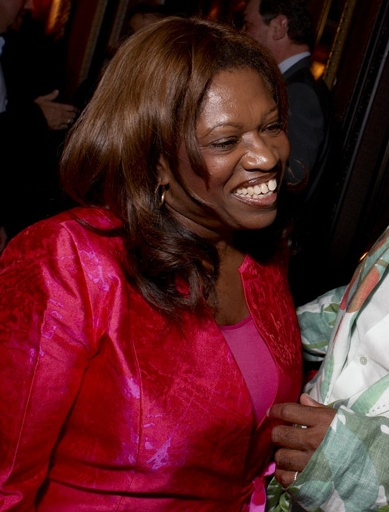
The song is a motherly tribute from Kanye to Donda West, who first booked him into a studio when he was aged 13.

The song's production was handled by West, alongside record producer and composer Jon Brion. Brion had achieved fame from his distinctive production work for artists and film scores for auteurs, though was lacking experience in hip hop. West became a fan of singer-songwriter Fiona Apple whom Brion had produced for; while watching 2004 film Eternal Sunshine of the Spotless Mind, he appreciated Brion's score. The pair became connected via their mutual friend Rick Rubin; West quickly phoned Brion and they instantly formed chemistry with each other. West enlisted him to work on Late Registration, marking Brion's first involvement in a hip hop project, with the decision creating confused reactions across his fanbase. Brion imagined people commenting that West has "gone off his rocker" and envisioning him making "an art record with some crazy, left-field music guy", clarifying this not to be "the case whatsoever". The producer recalled West taking charge of production with his strong vision and mentioned the rapper's "quick, intuitive decisions".

Kanye's mother Donda West helped support his dreams of creating music, following on from him dropping out of college completely. Donda had been aware of Kanye's musical interest for a long time, having accepted his offer for an hour of studio time when he was 13 years old. She worked with the mother of record producer No I.D., who became Kanye's mentor after they met through her. Speaking of Donda's involvement in his career, Kanye said she "always kept me around music" and "was also my first manager". Kanye has often paid tribute to Donda in his music, especially on "Hey Mama". According to Kanye West, she cried upon her first listen to the song. In June 2003, prior to the release of West's debut studio album The College Dropout (2004), he revealed that he had recorded the song in 2000 and was already saving it for Late Registration. In February 2014, West's 2001 demo tape The Prerequisite experienced an internet leak, including the original version of the song.

== Composition and lyrics ==
"Hey Mama"
A snippet of "Hey Mama", showcasing the sample of "Today Won't Come Again" by Donal Leace, handclaps, and drums evoking Tin Pan Alley towards the end of the song. On the hook, the "la-la-la" vocals are looped alongside harmonies.

Musically, "Hey Mama" is a ballad. The song is based around a sample of the 1972 track "Today Won't Come Again", as written and performed by American musician Donal Leace. Alongside the sample, handclaps are featured throughout. The song also includes a moaning vocoder, Tin Pan Alley-styled drums, and a xylophone solo, all of which were contributed by Brion. On the hook, Leace's "la-la-la" vocals from "Today Won't Come Again" are looped, accompanied by harmonies. The song closes with synthesizers, contributed by Brion. Additional vocals are provided on the song by singer John Legend.

Lyrically, the song serves as a tribute to Donda from Kanye. Kanye details how Donda supported him despite him doing the opposite of what she wanted, alongside depicting how he desired nothing due to her hard work as a single parent. He makes a promise to Donda of going back to school, as well as pleading to cry. Kanye West also mentions that she had to work at night to keep the lights on.

== Release and reception ==
On August 30, 2005, "Hey Mama" was released as the sixteenth track on West's second studio album Late Registration. The song was met with generally positive reviews from music critics, often being praised for its musical style. Sean Fennessey of Pitchfork saw the song as "traditionally purty" due to the prominence of handclaps and "a flittering sample" of "Today Won't Come Again", labeling it a typical West production and also appreciating "the Brion redux". Reviewing the album for The Observer, Steve Yates selected the song as a highlight and lauded it as "classic Kanye", alongside stating the "folk-rock vocal" has potential to "net butterflies". The Guardian journalist Alexis Petridis pointed out that the song features "an irresistible hook", viewing the lively harmonies as evoking Simon & Garfunkel. Rolling Stone editor Rob Sheffield put forward the song as being "an emotional stunner" akin to West's single "Jesus Walks" (2004) due to him "honor[ing] his mother", applauding how "a simple la-la-la vocal hook" is looped "into a soul-sonic force" that he compared to side two of Prince's Sign o' the Times (1987). Sheffield further honored the song as the best "family-affair tearjerker" since fellow rapper Ghostface Killah's "All That I Got Is You" (1996) because of West's rapping, though questioned the legitimacy of his promise of going back to school. Azeem Ahmad from musicOMH called the song "chilled", finding it funny how an ode to Donda West features Legend's "unmistakable soulful voice" offering a "low key but perfectly suitable performance". Writing for Entertainment Weekly, David Browne observed that the song conveys the "warmth and soul" of an old single by the Chi-Lites.

Some reviewers were less impressed with "Hey Mama". Matthew Gasteier of Prefix Mag was unsure about the lyrical content, seeing it as being largely surpassed by the inventive production. At The Observer, Kitty Empire saw the song as the only real threat "to derail [Kanye] West's terrific strike rate" on the album, saying it is "a good tune" despite the bad contrast of "gushing mother-love" with the other lyrical themes. Similarly, veteran critic Robert Christgau wrote in The Village Voice that the song may be one-dimensional, yet West still offers "an oxymoronic" line prior to "milking [his] oft dissed flow" for rhymes. Hattie Collins provided a negative review for NME, dismissing the song as a "saccharine slowie" and Late Registration's "only misfire", opening up that rapper Tupac took on its concept in the early 1990s "with far more panache".

In the United States, the song entered the Billboard Bubbling Under R&B/Hip-Hop Singles chart at number nine for the issue date of November 24, 2007. It lasted for one week on the chart. "Hey Mama" was later certified gold by the Recording Industry Association of America (RIAA) for amassing 500,000 certified units in the US on September 23, 2020. The song also charted in Canada, reaching number 64 on the Hot Canadian Digital Singles chart for the issue dated March 1, 2008.

== Live performances ==
West first performed "Hey Mama" at a homecoming show with Dilated Peoples at the House of Blues in Chicago on May 5, 2004, prior to its release. On September 9, 2005, West performed the song on The Oprah Winfrey Show, where the rapper said that it is tattooed on an arm of his and stands among his favorite songs. Kanye West also admitted saving the opportunity to perform the song on the show for Donda, who sat in the front row and described West dedicating it to her as "unbelievable". On October 13, 2005, West delivered a performance of "Hey Mama" during a stop at O'Connell Center in Gainesville, Florida, on his Touch the Sky tour. West later performed the song for the tour's concert at the theater of Madison Square Garden in New York City on November 3, while wearing a designer off-white blazer.

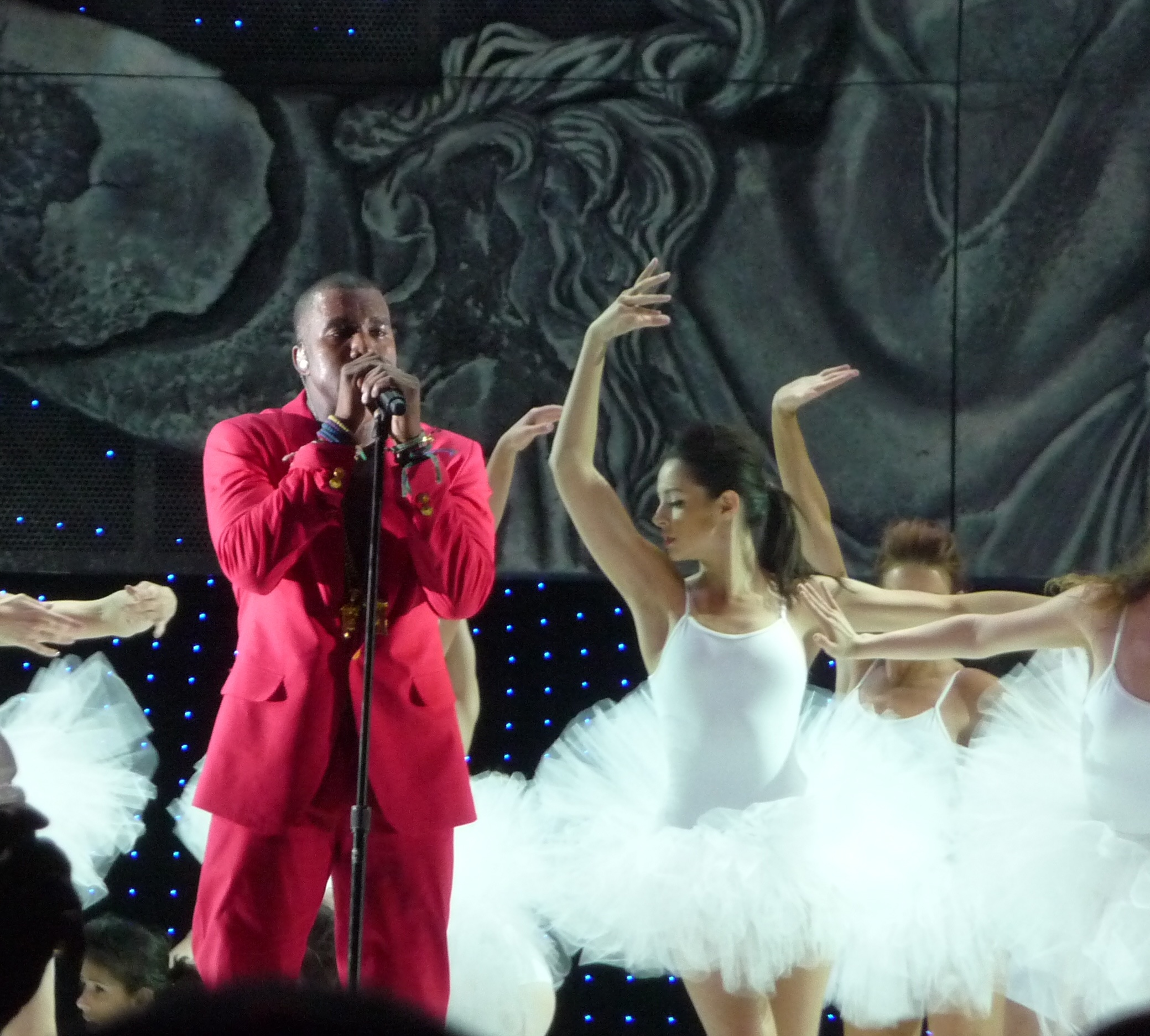
West closed his set at the 2011 Coachella Valley Music and Arts Festival with a performance of the song.

On November 17, 2007, around a week after Donda's death, Kanye failed to begin a performance of the song at Le Zenith in Paris, attempting an introduction when saying, "This song is for my mother ..." After stopping during the intro, Kanye was comforted by a backup singer, the show's DJ, and a guitar player. Kanye stood and cried, though the band continued to play the song. The rapper later restarted his performance, which he did not manage to finish. On November 24, 2007, Kanye performed the song to a projection of Donda at Brighton Centre in Brighton, England.

For his 2008 Glow in the Dark Tour, Kanye performed "Hey Mama" in dedication to Donda and segued from it into a cover of Journey's "Don't Stop Believin'" (1981). When appearing at the 2008 Grammy Awards, Kanye West paid tribute to Donda by singing a version of the song with altered lyrics for the ceremony. West had "MAMA" cut into his hair for the performance and during it, he stepped forward as paintings of angels flashed above. Shortly after his performance, West went to the studio and recorded the Grammy version of the song.

For the closer of his headlining set at the 2011 Coachella Festival, West performed a rendition of the song. During the opening show of The Yeezus Tour at the KeyArena in Seattle, West performed the song partially as he wore a sparkling black mask, but failed as fans saw West kneeling down while holding the microphone in an attempt to stand up and keep the performance up. On May 12, 2019, Kanye performed the song in tribute to Donda on Mother's Day at a concert of his group the Sunday Service Choir. Kanye opened the concert by walking out to fellow rapper 2Pac's single "Dear Mama", before delivering a gospel rendition of "Hey Mama". The performance was livestreamed through the same fisheye perspective as the rapper's April 2019 appearance at Coachella, while he closed his eyes as he performed.

== Appearances in media ==
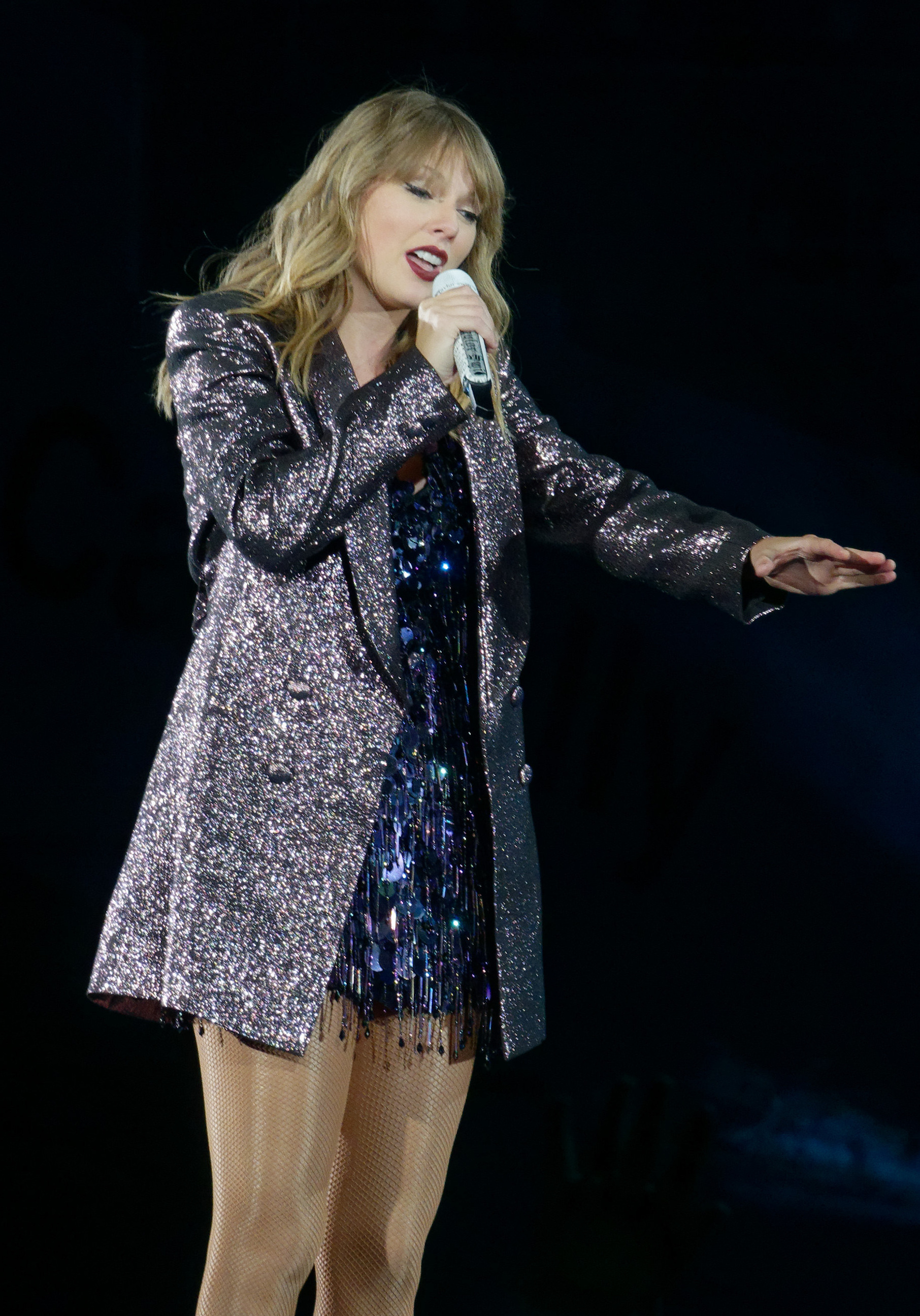
West's fans organized the event "Hey Mama Day" when the 10th anniversary of his mother's death coincided with the release of Taylor Swift's Reputation in November 2017, streaming the song on Spotify in protest.

On April 7, 2015, The Fader obtained footage of Kanye and Donda singing "Hey Mama" together, which concluded with the rapper wrapping an arm around her as they both grinned. On November 10, 2017, the release of West's rival Taylor Swift's album Reputation coincided with the 10th anniversary of Donda's death, leading to West fans organizing "Hey Mama Day". The event was organized to protest the album's release and block Swift from topping the charts by playing "Hey Mama", with the song gathering around 700,000 Spotify streams in 24 hours. However, it did not enter any Spotify charts due to the service realizing that the numbers stemmed from repeated listens.

On July 12, 2020, Kanye shared a snippet of his 2021 track "Donda" that is named after his mother via Twitter, alongside a video. The video features archival footage that shows the West's rapping "Hey Mama" together. Simultaneously, Kanye's wife Kim Kardashian shared the footage of the West's rapping.

== Credits and personnel ==
Information taken from Late Registration liner notes.

Recording

- Recorded at The Record Plant (Hollywood, CA), Sony Music Studios (NYC) and Grandmaster Recording Studios (Hollywood, CA)
- Mixed at Chalice Recording Studios (Hollywood, CA)

Personnel

- Kanye West – songwriter, producer
- Donal Leace – songwriter
- Jon Brion – producer
- Andrew Dawson – recorder, mix engineer
- Anthony Kilhoffer – recorder
- Tom Biller – recorder
- Richard Reitz – assistant engineer
- Matt Green – assistant engineer
- Taylor Dow – assistant engineer
- John Legend – additional vocals

== Charts ==
Chart performance for "Hey Mama"
Chart (2007–2008)	Peak position
Hot Canadian Digital Singles (Billboard)	64
US Bubbling Under R&B/Hip-Hop Singles (Billboard)	9

== Certifications ==
Certifications for "Hey Mama"
Region	Certification	Certified units/sales
United States (RIAA)	Gold	500,000^{‡}
^{‡} Sales+streaming figures based on certification alone.
