= Late Orchestration =

Live album by Kanye West
- Released: April 24, 2006
- Recorded: September 21, 2005
- Studio: Abbey Road (London)
- Genres: Hip-hop; big band
- Length: 47:19
- Label: Mercury
- Director: Tom Bird
- Producers: Kanye West; Vicki Betihavas

Kanye West chronology
Late Registration (2005)	Late Orchestration (2006)	Welcome to Kanye's Soul Mix Show (2006)

Professional ratings
Review scores
Source	Rating
AllMusic	3.5/5 stars
Entertainment.ie	3/5 stars

Late Orchestration is the first live album by American rapper Kanye West. It was released on April 24, 2006, through Mercury Records in Europe and Asia. The album features recordings of live renditions of songs derived from his first two studio albums, The College Dropout (2004) and Late Registration (2005), with its title being a play on the latter. It was recorded at Abbey Road Studios in London, England, before an audience of 300 invited guests on September 21, 2005.

West was backed by a seventeen-piece all-female string orchestra and featured guest appearances by John Legend, Lupe Fiasco, GLC and Consequence. The CD release features the full performance (12 tracks) along with an additional bonus track, "Gold Digger" (Live at AOL). The concert was also released on DVD as well as interviews and bonus music videos for the first four singles of Late Registration.

The cover photograph, taken by photographer Andrew Meredith, is a reference to the Beatles' cover of their 1969 album Abbey Road.

== Background ==
In an interview from the time, West explained that he chose to record with an orchestra in order to dispel what he saw as a dismissive attitude towards hip-hop as an art form. He felt that being able to "spit true, heartfelt rap lyrics in front of an orchestra is juxtaposing what’s thought to be two totally different forms of music... it shows you that it’s all music. We tried to alter people’s perception of the music", adding that he "[loves] pushing the envelope... I love to perform for those people who think they’ve seen everything before. But have you seen this? Can you get with this? That’s the toughest crowd [and] I love the challenge."

== Track listing ==
1. "Diamonds from Sierra Leone" – 4:08
2. "Touch the Sky" (featuring Lupe Fiasco) – 4:07
3. "Crack Music" – 2:48
4. "Drive Slow" (featuring GLC) – 4:34
5. "Through the Wire" – 3:33
6. "The New Workout Plan" – 2:53
7. "Heard 'Em Say" (featuring John Legend) – 4:10
8. "All Falls Down" – 3:13
9. "Bring Me Down" – 3:21
10. "Gone" (featuring Consequence) – 4:15
11. "Late" – 3:54
12. "Jesus Walks" – 3:14
13. "Gold Digger (AOL Sessions)" (bonus track) – 3:18

== Charts ==
Chart (2005)	Peak position
Irish Albums (IRMA)	46
Scottish Albums (Official Charts)	53
UK Albums (Official Charts)	59
UK R&B Albums (Official Charts)	8

== Certifications ==
Region	Certification	Certified units/sales
United Kingdom (BPI)	Gold	100,000^{‡}
^{‡} Sales+streaming figures based on certification alone.
