= Kennedy–King College =

Community college in Chicago, Illinois, US

- Former name: Woodrow Wilson Junior College (1935–1969)
- Motto: Education that Works
- Type: Community
- Established: 1935; 91 years ago
- Affiliations: City Colleges of Chicago
- Chairman: Katya Nuques
- Chancellor: Juan Salgado
- President: Katonja Webb Walker
- Provost: Mark Potter
- Location: 6301 S. Halsted Street, Chicago, Illinois, 60621, U.S. 41°46′42″N 87°38′38″W
- Campus: Urban
- Colors: Maroon and grey
- Mascot: Statesmen
- Website: ccc.edu/kennedy

Kennedy–King College (KKC) is a public municipal community college in the Englewood community area in the south side of Chicago, Illinois, United States. It is part of the City Colleges of Chicago system.

Kennedy–King was founded as Woodrow Wilson Junior College in 1935, named in honor of U.S. president Woodrow Wilson. The school was renamed to honor Robert F. Kennedy and Martin Luther King Jr. in July 1969, a year after they were both assassinated.

== Programs ==
KKC is a co-educational institution that awards associate degrees and career certificates. Entrance is noncompetitive and application is by rolling admission. Residents of the City of Chicago are charged lower tuition fees than non-residents. The total enrollment for financial year 2013 was 11,877. There is no on-campus housing.

KKC is City Colleges of Chicago's hub for culinary and hospitality. Launched in 2011 by Rahm Emanuel, Mayor of Chicago, College to Careers partners the colleges with industry leaders in high-growth fields to address the skills gap in Chicago's workforce. The initiative draws industry partners to work with faculty and staff in redesigning occupational program curricula and facilities to better match the needs of employers. In the fall of 2014, KKC launched a hospitality program to complement the school's culinary program.

== Campus and facilities ==
=== Former ===
The 18-acre (7.3 ha) original KKC campus, which spanned Wentworth Avenue, was completed in 1972. It included two gyms, a daycare center, a theater, a swimming pool, a television studio, and a radio station. The call letters for WKKC 89.3 FM radio stand for "We're Kennedy-King College".

The American Institute of Architects recognized the innovative design of the main campus building.

Kennedy–King College Library, which was founded as Woodrow Wilson Junior College Library in 1935, had over 50,000 books.

The school's address was 6800 South Wentworth Avenue, Chicago, Illinois 60621–3798. Woodrow Wilson Junior College was located at 6800 South Stewart Avenue, Chicago, as of November 1942.

In September 2005, the school was set to get a $192 million makeover. This included constructing new buildings and a prominent clock tower on a 40-acre (16.2 ha) new campus on Chicago's South Side. The architect of the project was Kennedy King Architects, Inc., a collaboration between VOA and Johnson & Lee Architects, both of Chicago. The lead project designers were Brandon Lipman, AIA of VOA and Chris Lee, AIA of Johnson & Lee. The original location was shuttered after completion of the new campus and has been demolished.

=== Current ===
The new Kennedy–King College campus is a 40-acre campus consisting of six buildings with a combined 500,000 square feet (46,000 m^{2}) of floor space. The campus is located at 6301 South Halsted Street, in the South Side neighborhood of Englewood. The campus features classrooms, a radio-TV and culinary building with four kitchens, a teaching restaurant, a 450-seat dining hall, a theater, three television production studios and offices and studios for WKKC. WYCC, a television station, operated from the college from 2007 to 2017. It also features an applied sciences building with a book store; auto technology lab; and shops for auto body work, welding, printing and heating, ventilating and air conditioning. The campus also has an athletic field, parking for 800 spaces, and a green roof. Mayor Richard M. Daley dedicated the new KKC on July 18, 2007, noting that 47 percent of construction dollars were awarded to minority and women vendors, and nearly 60 percent of construction workers were minorities.

== Dawson Technical Institute ==
The Dawson Technical Institute (DTI) is an occupational training center established in 1968 as the Chicago Skill Center (later the Chicago Urban Skills Institute) through the collaboration of the City Colleges and Thiokol. In 1973, the new skill center building was named in memorial for William L. Dawson (1886–1970), a local politician and lawyer who served 27 years in the United States House of Representatives and was the first African American to chair a Congressional committee. The institute was named DTI in 1985 and operated as a part of City-Wide College until the latter closed in 1993. DTI was under the auspices of Harold Washington College until 1995, when it joined KKC. The institute is located at 3901 South State Street in Chicago.

== Washburne Culinary & Hospitality Institute ==
In the fall of 2014, Washburne changed its name from Washburne Culinary Institute to Washburne Culinary & Hospitality Institute to reflect an added focus on hospitality management. In addition to granting associate degrees in hospitality management, the chef training program grants certificates and Associate of Arts degrees in culinary through KKC. Washburne-operated enterprises include the Washburne Café, the Washburne Café at Buckingham Fountain (seasonal), Parrot Cage, Sikia and Washburne Catering.

== WYCC - PBS Chicago ==
Kennedy–King College housed the studios for WYCC, the television station owned by the City Colleges, from 2006 to 2017, when it sold its broadcast spectrum and was then sold to WTTW.

== WKKC - 89.3 FM Radio ==
Kennedy–King has had a campus radio station, WKKC (89.3 FM), since 1976.

== Affiliations ==
The school participates in the National Junior College Athletic Association. The KKC men's basketball team reached the national top 20 in February 2007.

== Notable people ==
=== Alumni ===
- Christine Houston, screenwriter (KKC Associate of Arts in Theater, 1978)
- Sy Richardson, actor and screenwriter (KKC Associate of Arts in Black History and Music, 1972)
- Myron Rush, academic (WWC, 1941)

=== Faculty and staff ===
- John A. Barkey, President of Woodrow Wilson College in November 1942
- Paul Henning Willis was born in Texas, circa 1878, and died in Chicago on 5 September 1939. He was a social sciences instructor at Woodrow Wilson Junior College at the time of his death. He was a former staff member of the Crane Technical School and the Northwestern University School of Commerce. He served as field secretary for the YMCA in Illinois during World War I.

== Historical notes ==
A letter to the editor from the dean's office that appeared in the Suburbanite Economist dated 26 January 1941 pointed out that more than ten percent (6 of 59) of the Phi Beta Kappa graduates of the University of Chicago's Class of 1938 were among the first graduates (Class of 1936) from Woodrow Wilson Junior College. High honors also went to a remarkable number of Wilson's Class of 1938 when they graduated with four-year degrees in 1940.

The poet Gwendolyn Brooks graduated from Wilson Junior College in 1936.

Physicist and engineer Robert Henry "Pete" Bragg, Jr. also attended Wilson.
