= Garrard McClendon =

American professor and host

- Born: February 10, 1966 (age 60); Hammond, Indiana, U.S.
- Occupations: TV host, professor, filmmaker, writer
- Known for: Ax or Ask? The African American Guide to Better English
- Spouse: Quanica McClendon
- Children: 2
- Website: garrardmcclendon.com

Garrard McClendon (born February 10, 1966) is an American professor, writer, filmmaker, and the host of the PBS show CounterPoint with Garrard McClendon. He was the host of The McClendon Report and Garrard McClendon Live on CLTV, and earned the Emmy Award for his show Off 63rd with Garrard McClendon on WYCC.

McClendon earned a Ph.D. from Loyola University Chicago in Cultural and Educational Policy Studies. He also holds degrees from Wabash College and Valparaiso University. He is an associate professor of Educational Leadership and Policy Studies at Chicago State University.

He is the author of the book Ax Or Ask? the African American Guide to Better English.

Garrard McClendon's parents were murdered in 2009. The murderer was given a 120-year sentence. He made the documentary Forgiving Cain in his parents' honor.

McClendon published Donda's Rules: The Scholarly Works of Dr. Donda West - Mother of Kanye West in 2019. In 2013, McClendon had enlisted the students in his Philosophy of Education classes to help him mine various archives for Donda West’s full body of work: “The students did a wonderful job helping me find all of this archival material. We’re talking her scholarly works, her dissertation, her master’s thesis. We found personal notes of hers, poems of hers, hundreds of hours of her audio speeches. So in those six years, we’re compiling, we’re editing, and having conference calls with Kanye,” McClendon recounted.

In 2020, McClendon published President Thug: How the Father of 45,000 Lies Fleeced, Finagled, Phished, and Fooled Friends, Flunkies, Fawners, and Followers Into the Fiery Flames of Dante's Inferno - Donald Trump's Obsession With Hell.
