= Donda West =

American educator and mother of Kanye West (1949–2007)

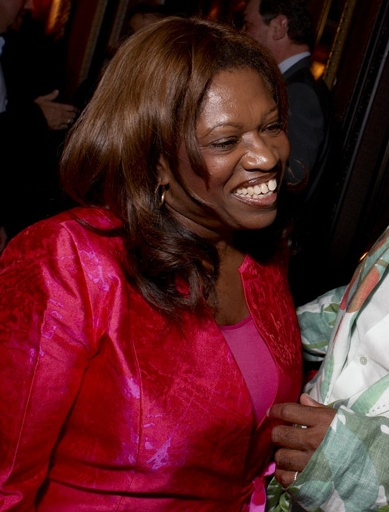
- West in 2007
- Born: Donda Clairann Williams; July 12, 1949; Oklahoma City, Oklahoma, U.S.
- Died: November 10, 2007 (aged 58); Los Angeles, California, U.S.
- Education: Virginia Union University (BA); Clark Atlanta University (MA); Auburn University (EdD)
- Occupations: Educator; author
- Spouse: Ray West (m. 1973; div. 1980)
- Children: Kanye West
- Relatives: North West (granddaughter)

Donda Clairann West (née Williams; July 12, 1949 – November 10, 2007) was an American educator and chair of Chicago State University's Department of English, Communications, Media, and Theater. She was best known for being the mother of American rapper Kanye West.

== Early life and career ==
West was born and raised in Oklahoma City, Oklahoma, the daughter of Lucille (née Eckles) and Portwood Williams Sr., a civil rights activist. On August 19, 1958, she and her father took part in the Katz Drug Store sit-in in Oklahoma City. West attended Douglass High School, graduating in 1967. She earned her bachelor's degree in English from Virginia Union University in 1971 and her doctoral degree from Auburn University in 1980.

West began her teaching career in the early 1970s at Morris Brown College in Atlanta and began working at Chicago State University in 1980. West taught English at Nanjing University for a year as a scholar through the Fulbright U.S. Scholar Program. In all, West spent 27 years at Chicago State, in head of the department of English, communications, media and theater. A statement from the university recalled West's role in establishing the university's Gwendolyn Brooks Center for Black Literature and Creative Writing "as an academic focus to teach writings of African-American authors and poets while fostering new literary talent."

West raised Kanye in the Chicago area after leaving Atlanta, where she had lived along with her husband, Ray, from whom she separated when Kanye was 3. Although she strongly emphasized the importance of education to Kanye, she fully supported him when he decided to drop out of college to pursue a music career. In 2004, she retired from teaching and moved to California to work full-time for her son. She was often seen at his side at parties and award shows. She was also a firm defender of her son's controversial comments. West stated that she "trained her son for greatness." "There is no room for shyness. I raised him that way, to think critically and analytically and not be afraid to voice what you feel. I helped shape that. I think leaders are people who must do that." She was also chief executive of West Brands, the parent company of her son's businesses.

West worked to address dropout and illiteracy rates, while partnering with community organizations to provide underprivileged youth access to music education. The Foundation's first initiative, Loop Dreams, challenged at-risk students to learn how to write and produce music while simultaneously improving their academic skills. In 2007, the foundation partnered with Strong American Schools as part of their "Ed in '08" campaign. In 2008, the foundation was renamed to the Dr. Donda West Foundation following her death. The Dr. Donda West Foundation was committed to providing high-quality programs in partnership with community organizations such as Challengers Boys & Girls Club in South Central Los Angeles, California. The foundation ceased operations in 2011.

== Death ==
On November 10, 2007, Donda West died at age 58. In January 2008, the Los Angeles County coroner's office said that she had died of coronary artery disease and multiple post-operative factors from cosmetic surgery. Authorities in Los Angeles launched an investigation into her death after learning the doctor who operated on her, Jan Adams, had convictions for alcohol-related offenses and at least two major malpractice settlements.

During Kanye's first concert following her funeral (performed at The O_{2} Arena in London on November 22), he dedicated a performance of "Hey Mama", as well as a cover of Journey's "Don't Stop Believin'," to his mother, and did so on all other dates of his Glow in the Dark Tour. She was posthumously featured and referenced on multiple songs in Kanye's 2021 namesake studio album for her, Donda.

== Legacy ==
California governor Arnold Schwarzenegger subsequently signed the "Donda West Law" in 2009. This legislation makes it mandatory for patients to receive medical clearance through a physical examination before undergoing elective cosmetic surgery.

West's memoir, Raising Kanye: Life Lessons from the Mother of a Hip-Hop Star, was published in 2009. West wrote in her book that she always wanted her son to go to college, but after witnessing his passion for hip hop and his talent producing beats, she later supported his decision to pursue music.

Kanye's writing partner and friend, Rhymefest, lamented West's death in an appearance on Chicago radio station WGCI. "She was everyone's mom," Rhymefest said. "A spirit never dies, a spirit lasts forever." Kanye and Rhymefest founded the non-profit Donda's House in 2013, a free music writing program with the goal of helping at-risk Chicago youth. It is aimed at students between 15 and 24, and includes lessons on how to write and record music. Their curriculum is based on the teaching philosophy and pedagogy of West with a focus on collaborative and experiential learning. Born Che Smith, Rhymefest grew up in Chicago, with Donda mentoring him as an educator. Donda's House was renamed Art of Culture, Incorporated after a contentious split between Rhymefest and Kanye.

In 2019, Garrard McClendon published Donda's Rules: The Scholarly Works of Dr. Donda West – Mother of Kanye West. McClendon is an associate professor of Educational Leadership and Policy Studies at Chicago State University. In 2013, McClendon enlisted the students in his Philosophy of Education classes to help him mine various archives for Donda West's full body of work: "The students did a wonderful job helping me find all of this archival material. We're talking her scholarly works, her dissertation, her master's thesis. We found personal notes of hers, poems of hers, hundreds of hours of her audio speeches. So in those six years, we're compiling, we're editing, and having conference calls with Kanye," McClendon recounted.

Mahalia Ann Hines, Common's mother, said, "Donda was beautiful. She was intelligent, patient, and generous. Her words were written with power and this book proves it." Brenda M. Greene, professor and mother of recording artist Talib Kweli, said, "Donda and I were kindred spirits as sisters in the network of hip-hop mothers. She was an unsung leader who infused culture and 'knowledge of self' into the curriculum. Donda loved her students."

== In popular culture ==
She is the subject of Kanye's song "Hey Mama", which appeared on his 2005 album Late Registration. On "Touch the Sky" from the same album, Kanye thanks his mother for always supporting him during the lean times, especially when she drove him to Newark, New Jersey from Chicago in a rented U-Haul van.

On January 5, 2012, Kanye announced his establishment of the creative content company Donda, named after his mother.

Kanye also named his tenth studio album, released in 2021, Donda, after his mother. Kanye donated student tickets to Chicago State University for the listening session of the album.

On February 23, 2022, Kanye released Donda 2, his first sequel album to Donda. Later that year, Kanye launched a marketing agency and clothing line named Donda Sports. He also opened Donda Academy, a pre-kindergarten to Grade 12 Christian private school, in Simi Valley, California. The school's basketball team, the Donda Doves, includes top prospects from across the United States.
