= Gone (Kanye West song) =

Song by Kanye West featuring Cam'ron & Consequence

from the album Late Registration
- Released: August 30, 2005
- Studio: The Record Plant (Hollywood); Capitol Recording (Hollywood)
- Genre: Hip hop
- Length: 5:32
- Label: Roc-A-Fella; Def Jam
- Songwriters: Kanye West; Dexter Mills; Cameron Giles; Chuck Willis
- Producer: Kanye West

"Gone" is a song by American rapper Kanye West from his second studio album, Late Registration (2005). The song features guest appearances from fellow rappers Cam'ron and Consequence. It was solely produced by West, who served as a songwriter alongside the rappers and Chuck Willis, the latter of which received credit due to having written the sampled work. A hip hop track, it contains samples of Otis Redding's version of "It's Too Late". The song's production is largely orchestral, featuring string arrangements. Lyrically, it sees West speaking of potentially abandoning fame and moving elsewhere for seeking a simpler life.

"Gone" received generally positive reviews from music critics, who often highlighted the sample of "It's Too Late". Some complimented West's rapping, while numerous reviewers appreciated the strings. In 2009, Pitchfork listed the song among the 200 best songs of the 2000s. It was performed by West, Cam'ron, and Consequence for West's debut live album, Late Orchestration (2006). In September 2013, Marina Shifrin released a video of herself dancing to the song when leaving a job at Next Media Animation. This clip went viral on YouTube, while it caused the song to debut at number 18 on the US Billboard Hot 100 and number six on the Hot R&B/Hip-Hop Songs chart. The song received a gold certification in the United States from the Recording Industry Association of America (RIAA).

== Background and recording ==
West provided guest vocals on Cam'ron's single "Down and Out" from his fourth studio album Purple Haze (2004), as well as receiving a production credit on the song. However, West later admitted in 2006 that the production was actually handled by Brian "All Day" Miller, though revealed himself to be fond of the beat and recalled the positive reception it gathered. West also received credit as a producer on fellow Purple Haze track "Dip-Set Forever", before working with Cam'ron on "Gone". The rapper freestyled over West's single "Runaway" in 2010, expressing his anger towards him for not contributing a verse to his album. Later that year, West featured Cam'ron on the original version of "Christmas in Harlem".

American record producer and composer Jon Brion had achieved fame from his distinctive production work for artists and film scores for auteurs, though was lacking experience in hip hop. West became a fan of singer-songwriter Fiona Apple whom Brion had produced for; while watching 2004 film Eternal Sunshine of the Spotless Mind, he appreciated Brion's score. The pair became connected via record producer Rick Rubin, a mutual friend of theirs, and West quickly phoned Brion and they instantly formed chemistry with each other. The rapper enlisted him to work on Late Registration, marking Brion's first involvement in a hip hop project; the decision created confusion across his fanbase. Brion imagined people commenting that West has "gone off his rocker" and envisioning him making "an art record with some crazy, left-field music guy", clarifying this not to be "the case whatsoever". The latter recalled West taking charge of production with his strong vision and mentioned the rapper's "quick, intuitive decisions". "Gone" was produced by West, who co-wrote it with Consequence, Cam'ron, and singer-songwriter Chuck Willis, the fourth of which received credit due to having written the work that is sampled. An 18-piece orchestra played for the song, with the string orchestrations being handled by violinist Eric Gorfain, who also contributes his instrument. The strings were recorded by Tom Biller at Capitol Recording Studios in Hollywood, California. Speaking of these instruments, Brion said: "There's a whole string section, and it turns into crazy soundtrack music. It's a big piece of work."

== Composition and lyrics ==
"Gone"
A 30-second sample of "Gone", showcasing Brion's string arrangements appearing in small bursts, performed by an 18-piece orchestra. The strings are accompanied by a drum beat and have a detailed counterpoint as West raps, moving with the rise and fall of his voice. West makes a threat to move to his aunt's house in Oklahoma, contemplating going away from fame.

Musically, "Gone" is a hip hop track. The song is built around a looped sample of American singer Otis Redding's 1965 version of "It's Too Late", originally written and performed by Willis, which is used as the hook. "Gone" has a lush orchestral production, relying on string arrangements that were done by Brion. The arrangements were performed by an 18-piece orchestra, consisting of 10 violinists, four violists, and four cellists, whose instruments appear in small bursts. As well as the strings, the song features a drum beat. After starting with the Redding sample, it moves into a two-chord piano ostinato, followed by a simplistic funk beat. The string section changes to a detailed counterpoint when West raps, going along with the rise and fall of his voice. West's final verse is preceded by an instrumental passage, which consists of nearly a minute of stabs. The song features two verses from West, who performs first and is succeeded by guest verses from Cam'ron and Consequence, before delivering the 30-bar closing verse.

In the lyrics of "Gone", West considers the idea of abandoning fame and relocating somewhere in a breadbasket area to find a simpler life. He details his escape fantasy, threatening to "move to Oklahoma and just live at my aunt's house". West also insults fellow rappers he deems as unworthy of his production expertise, assuring that what they "could get is a job from me". Cam'ron delivers onomatopoeic Dadaism, stating he does not need a roof. Consequence tells a story that involves his friend dying, a nest egg being stolen, drinking alcohol, and at least one life-changing mistake occurring.

== Release and reception ==
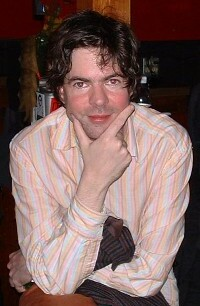
Several reviewers highlighted the song's strings, which were contributed by Jon Brion and a couple of them focused on his chemistry with West.

"Gone" was released as the nineteenth track on West's second studio album Late Registration on August 28, 2005, standing as the last track before any bonuses. The song was met with generally positive reviews from music critics, with them mostly praising the sample of "It's Too Late". Journalist Jon Caramanica selected the song as the best track on the album in a review for Spin, commenting that it sees West "getting indignant over a tough Otis Redding sample" and Cam'ron delivering "a blistering verse". The Guardian critic Alexis Petridis viewed the sample as providing "an irresistible hook", while Rolling Stone journalist Rob Sheffield noted that it is used to build "a totally mental funk loop". Writing for The Village Voice, veteran critic Robert Christgau detailed that the Redding sample and strings cause the song to "sneak up over the long haul". Josh Tyrangiel from Time commended West's storytelling ability and appreciated his musicality, stating that because of the sample and "some ecstatic string arrangements", you may "be persuaded that West is as good as he thinks he is" after one listen to the song. Chet Betz of Cokemachineglow declared the song "the full B&W; synergy of Don Kanye and Sancho Brion's mad reaching for the stars". Betz also saw the Redding sample as West using "his celebrity power to clear whatever shit he wants to have cleared", finalizing that the "six dynamic minutes long" song is universal.

Sasha Frere-Jones, at The New Yorker, praised the chemistry between West and Brion, writing that the song "bleeds into a two-chord piano ostinato" after the beginning's Redding sample, until "a trim funk beat" follows. She asserted that Brion's string arrangements enter the song "in small staccato bursts, deferring to and reinforcing the beat", while West "warm[s] up by putting down his rivals". Frere-Jones said it later "decelerates into a spooky instrumental passage" and West returns with his ego "in high gear", accompanied by strings that she believed work as hard as him. Blender's Jonah Weiner saw the song as one of the darker moments on Late Registration, depicting West's threat of moving to Oklahoma as "a bitter escape fantasy". Sean Fennessey of Pitchfork credited West's decision to feature Cam'ron on the song, writing that "the ineffable [rapper] continues his magical run" with humorous remarks evoking savant syndrome. In a lukewarm review for The New York Times, journalist Jon Pareles stated that West's "cool arrogance" is less comedic on "the backbiting 'Gone'" than fellow album track "Gold Digger". Entertainment Weekly journalist David Browne pointed to West insulting fellow rappers "unworthy of his production expertise" on the song as an example of him being "predictably paranoid". In a mixed review at Prefix Mag, Matthew Gasteier lauded the song's strings, yet expressed that Consequence's weak performance does not fit.

=== Accolades ===
On a 2009 list of the 200 best songs of the 2000s decade by Pitchfork, "Gone" was placed at number 71. Fennessey observed how the song's Redding sample "beams in like a ray of sunlight on a mostly baroque album", setting up "this swelling peak of sonic pomp", which he glorified for having "the most insistent and insinuating" Brion composition on Late Registration, writing that West "cackles at his own grandeur" by featuring Cam'ron "right in the thick of it". Fennessey said the rapper is followed by Consequence's average verse, then "Philip Glass-ian stabs" for almost a minute, ultimately ending with West's last verse that he called one of his best ever "on one of his finest songs". In 2013, Complex named West's second verse as his 10th best of all time, with Al Shipley assuring that it surpasses Cam'ron and Consequence's appearances. Shipley proclaimed that West delivers 30 "relentless bars" over "Brion's playfully textured" strings, beginning to show signs of "bristling at the limitations of the music industry", shortly after it had begun "opening its doors for him".

== Live performances and other usage ==
West performed the song with Consequence at Abbey Road Studios in London on September 29, 2005, for his 2006 live album Late Orchestration. On March 21, 2009, West performed the song during his GOOD Music concert at Levi's/Fader Fort for South by Southwest (SXSW). Consequence joined West for the performance, standing among the guest features delivered as part of the showcase of GOOD artists.

In September 2013, Marina Shifrin decided to quit her job as a video editor for Taiwanese animator Next Media Animation after being overworked, shooting a video of herself dancing to "Gone" in her office at 4:30 a.m. She says in text scrolling over the clip that her boss "only cares about quantity and how many views each video gets", alluding to the media industry's larger challenge of finding a balance between publishing great stories and scoring many page views. Shifrin told the HuffPost that she understanding making the clip posed a risk, though pointed out how she "never named the company or my boss". On December 31, 2021, rapper Cordae shared an old video of him rapping over "Gone", with the caption "16 yr old me was fake nice haha." The clip includes him delivering the lines "Couldn't find the basement / We try to move up but we climb adjacent".

=== Commercial reception ===
Following Shifrin's viral YouTube video, counting towards 6.2 million streams of "Gone" in the United States, the song entered the US Billboard Hot 100 at number 18 for the issue dated October 9, 2013. The entry occurred eight years after the song's release and was also driven by digital sales of 9,000, a large increase from minuscule levels in the previous week, while it debuted at number four on the US Streaming Songs chart. "Gone" appeared on the US Hot R&B/Hip-Hop Songs and Hot Rap Songs charts, reaching numbers six and four, respectively. On July 17, 2026, it was certified gold by the Recording Industry Association of America (RIAA) for amassing 500,000 certified units in the US. The song also charted in France, debuting at number 168 on the SNEP chart.

== Credits and personnel ==
Information taken from Late Registration liner notes.

Recording

- Recorded at The Record Plant (Hollywood, CA)
- Mixed at Chalice Recording Studios (Hollywood, CA)
- Strings recorded at Capitol Recording Studios (Hollywood, CA)

Personnel

- Kanye West – songwriter, producer
- Dexter Mills – songwriter
- Cameron Giles – songwriter
- Chuck Willis – songwriter
- Anthony Kilhoffer – recorder
- Andrew Dawson – mix engineer
- Richard Reitz – assistant engineer
- Taylor Dow – assistant engineer
- Tom Biller – strings recorder

Additional musicians

- Jon Brion – string arrangements
- Eric Gorfain – string orchestrations, violin
- Daphne Chen – violin
- Victoria Lanier – violin
- Julie Rogers – violin
- Alyssa Park – violin
- Audrey Solomon – violin
- Terry Glenny – violin
- Susan Chatman – violin
- Marisa Kuney – violin
- Amy Wickman – violin
- Marda Todd – viola
- Piotr Jandule – viola
- Tom Tally – viola
- David Sage – viola
- Richard Dodd – cello
- Matt Cooker – cello
- Armen Ksajikian – cello
- Victor Lawrence – cello

== Charts and certifications ==
=== Weekly charts ===
Chart performance for "Gone"
Chart (2013)	Peak position
France (SNEP)	168
US Billboard Hot 100	18
US Hot R&B/Hip-Hop Songs (Billboard)	6

=== Certifications ===
Certifications for "Gone"
Region	Certification	Certified units/sales
United States (RIAA)	Gold	500,000^{‡}
^{‡} Sales+streaming figures based on certification alone.
