= Robert Henry Bragg Jr. =

American physicist (1919–2017)

- Born: August 11, 1919; Jacksonville, Florida, U.S.
- Died: October 2, 2017 (aged 98)
- Education: Woodrow Wilson Junior College; Illinois Institute of Technology
- Known for: First African-American to chair an engineering department at Berkeley
- Awards: Fellow of the National Society of Black Physicists (NSBP) 1995
- Scientific career
- Fields: Physics
- Workplaces: Research Institute of Illinois Institute of Technology; Palo Alto Research Laboratory of Lockheed Missiles and Space Company; University of California at Berkeley; Lawrence Berkeley Laboratory
- Academic advisors: Frances L. Yost; Leonid V. Azaroff

Robert Henry “Pete” Bragg Jr. (August 11, 1919 – October 2, 2017), was a professor in the Department of Materials Science and Engineering in the UC Berkeley College of Engineering.

== Early life and education ==
Bragg Jr. was born in Jacksonville, Florida on August 11, 1919 to Robert Henry Bragg and Lily Camille MacFarland. Following his parents' separation, Bragg ended up moving to Memphis, Tennessee with his mother and grandmother prior to moving to Chicago, Illinois, where he attended Tilden Technical High School and Woodrow Wilson Junior College.

After his 2 years at Woodrow Wilson Junior College, Bragg had served in the military during World War II. While in the military, Bragg had gotten accepted to the Army Specialized Training Program, allowing him to continue his studies at Rhode Island State College prior to the program's eventual shutdown. Bragg used the money allotted to him from the G.I. Bill to attend Illinois Institute of Technology (IIT), and pursue a career in physics.

Bragg earned a BS degree in 1949 and an MS degree in 1951 and subsequently worked for the Dover Electroplating Company and at the Portland Cement Association Research Laboratory, focusing on x-ray crystallography and diffraction. Bragg later worked in the solid-state physics department of the Armor Research Foundation at IIT while working underneath mentor Leonid V. Azaroff for his doctoral studies.

He earned his PhD in physics from the Illinois Institute of Technology in 1960, and worked for Palo Alto Research Laboratory for the Lockheed Missiles and Space Company from 1960 to 1969, eventually becoming the Metallurgy Department's manager.

== Career ==
In 1969, the University of California at Berkeley hired him as a full professor, and he also became a principal investigator at the Materials and Molecular Division at Lawrence Berkeley Laboratory. His research was in the areas of X-ray crystallography, eutectic solidification, and the properties of carbon materials.

While at Berkeley, Bragg served on the policy advisory board of the Black Studies program and managed the Chancellor's Fellowship Program providing opportunities for minority faculty.

Bragg retired from the Berkeley faculty in 1987, after a career that included service as Department Chair from 1978 to 1981. At the time he was one of six black faculty members.

In retirement, Bragg was awarded a Fulbright fellowship to conduct research at the University of Ife in Nigeria in 1992, and developed an exhibit for the Museum of African American Technology in Oakland. In 1995, Bragg became a fellow of the National Society of Black Physicists.

He was not related to the British Bragg family of scientists.
