= WKKC =

Radio station at Kennedy-King College in Chicago

Chicago, Illinois; United States
- Frequency: 89.3 MHz (HD Radio)
- Branding: 89.3 WKKC-FM

Programming
- Format: Urban contemporary

Ownership
- Owner: City Colleges of Chicago

History
- First air date: 1975
- Call sign meaning: Kennedy–King College

Technical information
- Licensing authority: FCC
- Facility ID: 6115
- Class: A
- ERP: 280 watts horizontal 210 watts vertical
- HAAT: 33.8 meters (111 ft)
- Transmitter coordinates: type:city 41°46′48.00″N 87°38′38.00″W

Links
- Public license information: Public file; LMS
- Website: wkkc.fm

WKKC (89.3 FM) is an educational non-profit radio station in Chicago, Illinois, owned by Kennedy–King College and broadcasting primarily to the city's South Side. The studio and transmitter are at the campus in the school's Englewood neighborhood. The station is used to train students in broadcasting and communications.

The station broadcasts in HD Radio with two subchannels, an urban adult contemporary format on HD1 and classic hip hop on HD2.

== History ==
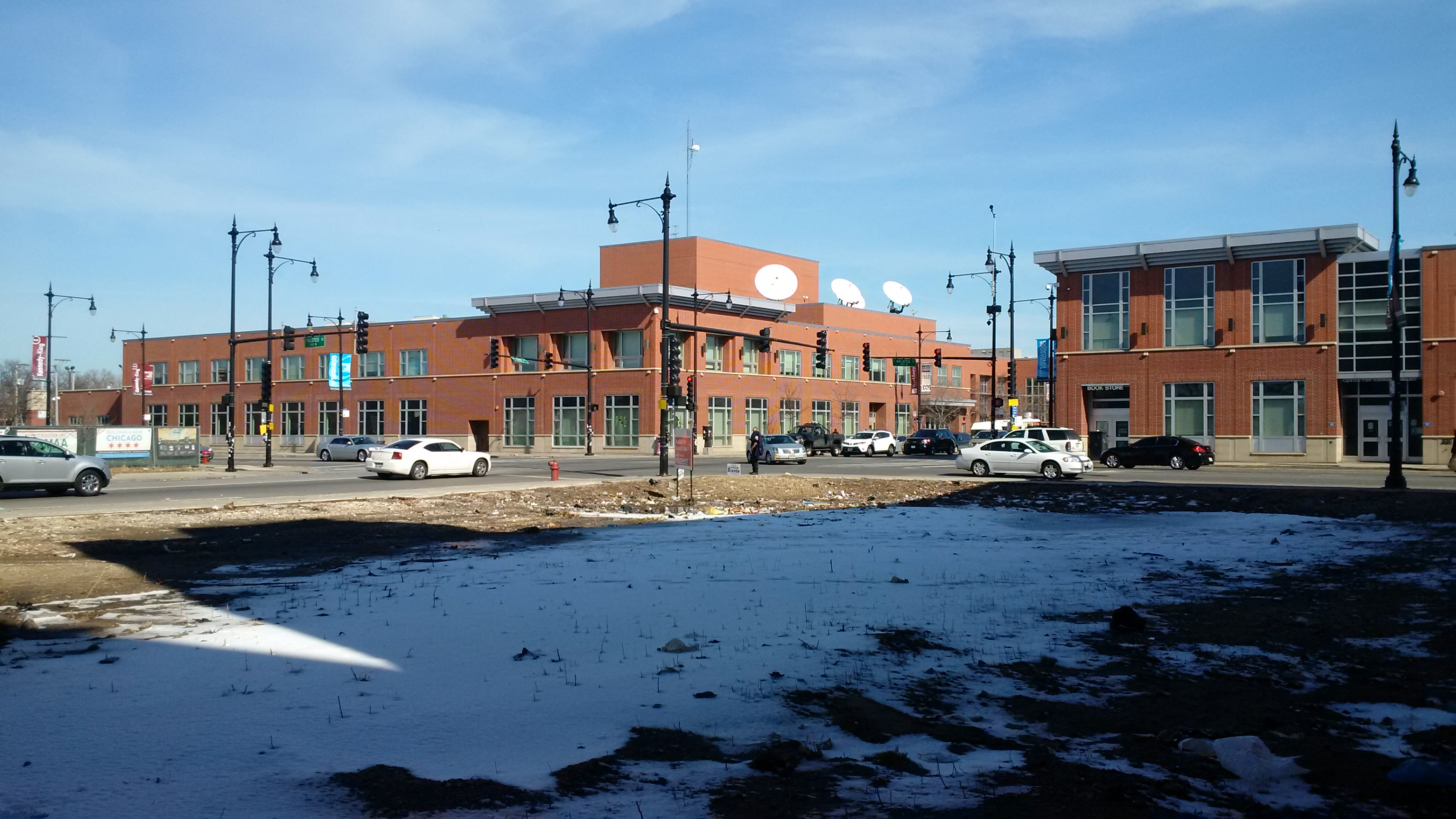
The media center on the KKC campus. The pole seen holds the FM antenna

The station received its construction permit on August 5, 1975, more than a year after filing on May 6, 1974. Northwestern University, owner of co-channel WNUR in Evanston, objected, and the original application was returned and resubmitted. A license to cover was filed for in October 1975. Power was raised from 10 to 250 watts in 1985.

The station was noted for its policy of refusing to play rap with violent lyrics during daytime hours. DJ Rashad later worked as a DJ at WKKC before becoming an electronic musician.

== See also ==
- Campus radio
- List of college radio stations in the United States
