= Donal Leace =

American musician and educator (1939–2020)

Donal Richard Leace
- Born: May 6, 1939; Huntington, West Virginia, U.S.
- Died: November 21, 2020 (aged 81) Washington, D.C., U.S.
- Genre: Folk
- Occupations: Musician, Educator
- Instruments: Vocals, guitar
- Years active: 1960–2014
- Labels: Franc, Gateway, JBL, Atlantic Records Atlantic Studios

Donal Richard Leace (May 6, 1939 – November 21, 2020) was an American musician and educator.

== Early life and education ==
Leace was born in Huntington, West Virginia, and raised in Philadelphia, later moving to New York City and Washington D.C. He received a degree from Howard University and graduate degrees from Georgetown University and George Washington University. He was also honored as both a Fulbright Scholar and US Presidential Scholar.

== Career ==
During the 1960s, he worked and lived at The Cellar Door in Georgetown. For a while a sign at the club read “The Home of Donal Leace”. He performed with John Denver, Nina Simone, Odetta, Judy Collins, Muddy Waters, Ramsey Lewis, The Staple Singers, The Chad Mitchell Trio, Manhattan Transfer, Take 6, Sonny Terry, Brownie McGhee, Big Mama Thornton and Emmylou Harris. He toured nationally with Nancy Wilson and worldwide with Roberta Flack.

He also appeared and recorded with comedians Bill Cosby, Richard Pryor, Mort Sahl and Dick Gregory. Leace had notable Television appearances on The Today Show, Sunday Morning, and the David Frost show. Leace is mentioned in the discography of Keith Jarrett. Leace was Chair of the Drama Department at the Duke Ellington School of the Arts, Washington, DC, where some of his notable students included Dave Chappelle and Denyce Graves. Leace often appeared on Dick Cerri's radio show, Music Americana and participated in World Folk Music Association (WFMA) events including their annual concerts.

Leace’s recordings of “Oh! Alabama” and “The Death of Medgar Evers” on some of his many recordings captured the pathos of the 1960s Civil Rights era. His 1962 recording "At The Shadows" with Carol Hedin was groundbreaking featuring Leace, a black male folk singer-guitarist and Hedin, a white female singer and autoharpist, a racial crossover. It was recorded at "The Shadows" restaurant in Washington, D.C., on September 16, 1962.

In video footage, Leace is listed as a regular performer on the early PBS music program The Show in 1970.

Leace appeared and recorded with a number of artists including Odetta, Muddy Waters, Nancy Wilson, and Roberta Flack. He was considered a master interpreter of contemporary American songwriting, but he also made his mark was as an educator teaching theater arts, at the Duke Ellington School in D.C. Leace was recognized as both a Fulbright and a U.S. Presidential Scholar.

== Death ==
Leace died from COVID-19 in Washington, D.C., on November 21, 2020, at the age of 81.

== Industry awards ==
Washington Area Music Association Hall of Fame – 2000

Washingtonian Magazine's "Washington Music Hall of Fame" – 2003

== Discography ==
Leace made several recordings.

Specific examples follow.

- At The Shadows with Carol Hedin (1962) - Franc
- Donal Leace At The Cellar Door (1965) - Gateway Recordings
- Donal Leace (1972) – Atlantic
- Leace On Life (1992) – JBL (reissued in 2007)
- Freedom Is A Constant Struggle: Songs of the Mississippi Civil Rights Movement (1994) - Folk Era Productions
- Leace Renewed (2002) – JBL
