= Heard 'Em Say =

- Main cover. Different versions are also available in yellow and blue.

Single by Kanye West featuring Adam Levine

from the album Late Registration
- B-side: "Touch the Sky"
- Released: October 24, 2005
- Recorded: 2005
- Studio: Sony Music Studios (New York); Grandmaster Recording (Hollywood, California)
- Genre: Hip-hop
- Length: 3:23
- Label: Roc-A-Fella; Def Jam
- Songwriters: Kanye West; Adam Levine; Michael Masser; Gerry Goffin
- Producers: Kanye West; Jon Brion

Kanye West singles chronology
"Extravaganza" (2005)	"Heard 'Em Say" (2005)	"Brand New" (2005)

Adam Levine singles chronology
"Heard 'Em Say" (2005)	"Bang Bang" (2010)

Music video
- "Heard 'Em Say (Version 1)" on YouTube "Heard 'Em Say (Version 2)" on YouTube

"Heard 'Em Say" is a song by American rapper Kanye West from his second studio album, Late Registration (2005). The song features a guest appearance from Adam Levine of Maroon 5. It was produced by West with Jon Brion, the former of which served as a songwriter alongside Levine, while Michael Masser and Gerry Goffin also received credit due to the sample of "Someone That I Used to Love". When West played Levine an early version of the song during a flight to Rome in 2004, the singer felt he had a chorus written that would work perfectly. West lacked certainty about collaborating with Levine before hearing him in rehearsal at the 47th Annual Grammy Awards, after which the two recorded the song quickly with assistance from Brion. It marked the first song recorded for the album and originally, West sang the chorus.

On October 24, 2005, "Heard 'Em Say" was released on a 12" vinyl as the third single from Late Registration by Roc-A-Fella and Def Jam. A hip-hop ballad, it relies on excerpts of Natalie Cole's "Someone That I Used to Love" and features a subdued instrumentation, which includes keyboards and piano chords. The song contains a lullaby tone, as well as an R&B chorus and elements of art rock. Lyrically, West laments the socioeconomical issues facing African-Americans while reminding listeners to appreciate the present, taking the perspective of a struggling citizen confused by the world.

"Heard 'Em Say" received widespread acclaim from music critics, who generally appreciated the musical style. Some praised Levine's vocal performance, while numerous critics appreciated West's lyrical talent. The song garnered a nomination for Best Hip-Hop Song Collaboration at the 2006 Groovevolt Music and Fashion Awards. In the United States, it debuted at the last position of the Billboard Hot 100 while West's single "Gold Digger" was at number one, making him the seventh artist to bookend the chart. The former marked a crossover success for West and Levine, and peaked at number 26 on the Hot 100. The song also reached the top 40 in Australia, Finland, Ireland, New Zealand, and the United Kingdom. It has been certified platinum in the US and the UK by the Recording Industry Association of America (RIAA) and British Phonographic Industry (BPI), respectively.

The song's first music video was directed by Joe DeMaio and Michel Gondry, who took two years to be persuaded by West to collaborate; it was filmed in October 2005 and aired in December. The visual was shot live-action, depicting West keeping watch of his children inside the Macy's Herald Square store as they play around. After West felt dissatisfied with the visual, he commissioned Bill Plympton to shoot an alternate video, which premiered in November 2005. The music video features extensive use of pencil-sketch animation and casts West as a taxicab driver picking up passengers in a fictional city, until a lit cigarette match starts a fire that kills him. The first video won Best Hip-Hop Video at the 2006 Music Video Production Awards, while the second one was very well received by critics. West performed "Heard 'Em Say" at the Coachella and Global Gathering festivals in 2006 and 2008, respectively. A cover version of the song was performed for BBC Radio 1Xtra in March 2016 by G-Eazy, who censored certain lyrics.

== Background ==
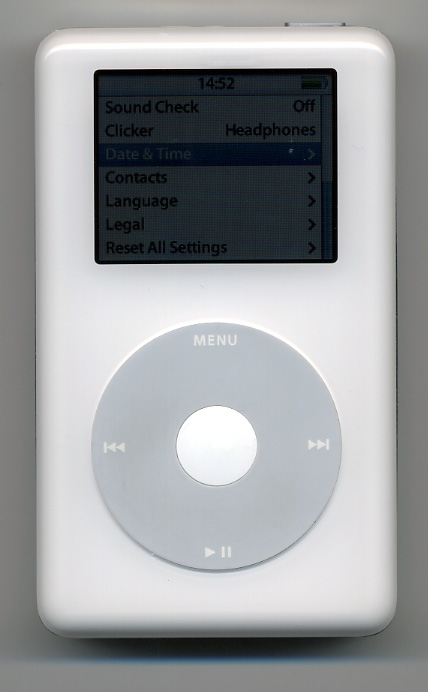
West and Adam Levine developed a friendship sitting together on a flight to Rome. The rapper played an early version of "Heard 'Em Say" for Levine on his iPod.

West enlisted pop rock band Maroon 5's frontman Adam Levine to sing the chorus of "Heard 'Em Say". He and Levine had first collaborated when Maroon 5 commissioned West to remix their 2004 single "This Love", spending time recording it in the studio together. Later on, the two developed a friendship when sitting together on a flight to Rome for the 2004 MTV Europe Music Awards. While playing songs from Late Registration on his iPod for Levine, West previewed an undeveloped version of "Heard 'Em Say", the very first track recorded for the album. As Levine recalled, "He was rhyming over [the track], and I had just written a hook that was so perfect for it. It was one of those natural collaborations where you're so excited because it's all very pure and very easy." West himself initially went back and forth on collaborating with Levine, feeling that the singer may be too popular for him while being appreciative of his vocal talent. He explained that Levine's popularity "takes away from the illness of having him", yet ultimately decided to work with him because his voice sounds "so ill" that it resembles "a fucking instrument". Levine would later appropriate "Heard 'Em Say" for the Maroon 5 song "Nothing Lasts Forever" in 2007.

For Late Registration, West collaborated with film score composer and multi-instrumentalist Jon Brion. Through layered arrangements and a meticulous attention to songwriting, Brion's involvement is evident on "Heard 'Em Say" and throughout the album, for which him and West managed to craft sophisticated, baroque hip-hop. West's sonic reference points ranged outside the realm of mainstream hip-hop artists, drawing from British trip hop band Portishead, the Beatles, Stevie Wonder, and Pink Floyd. He recruited Brion to dress the record with lush, orchestral arrangements that fit his widening musical vision. Brion's orchestral arrangements and progressive rock flourishes filled the song with a high sense of drama, while channeling vulnerability across the record. The tone of "Heard 'Em Say" and other songs from Late Registration would lay out the foundation for West's maximalist approach to music. This style became a trademark of the rapper's subsequent works, most prominently his fifth studio album My Beautiful Dark Twisted Fantasy (2010) and the GOOD Music compilation album Cruel Summer (2012).

The song was written by West alongside Levine, with additional songwriting credits for Michael Masser and Gerry Goffin due to them having written the sampled work "Someone That I Used to Love" (1977) by American singer Natalie Cole. West co-produced the track with Brion. Although "Heard 'Em Say" is the first full song on Late Registration, it is preceded by an intro entitled "Wake Up Mr. West" that features a reprisal of West's sociable inner voice. The intro is a skit that continues where West's debut studio album The College Dropout finished, spoken by comedian DeRay Davis, who plays a school administrator still unsatisfied with West's classroom performance. The college teacher exclaims, "I knew I was gon' see you again!" in an impersonation of comedian Bernie Mac and questions, "Where your goddamn book bag at?" As the piano instrumental rises in the background, West falls asleep in class, until a yell of the "Wake up Mr. West!" refrain wakes him from his stupor. This setting ends with the refrain echoing, fading into the beginning of "Heard 'Em Say". The phrase and its accompanying piano melody purposefully bleeds into the album's full opening track.

Similarly to West exploring a new style with The College Dropout, he opted to take rap lyricism in a different direction on Late Registration by experimenting with ideas beyond the dominant gangsta lifestyle and attitude of mainstream hip-hop. While some of Late Registration is celebratory, "Heard 'Em Say" stands among the songs that follow a contemplative political path. "Heard 'Em Say" is one of many pop-oriented songs from the album that represent a wide scope of human experience, which contain political dissatisfaction and the personal trauma that caused it. Atop a spare, compulsive backing track, West delivers lyrics which take a dissective view of American life, taking on the perspective of a downtrodden citizen and depicting an anxious youth.

== Recording ==
"Heard 'Em Say" was the very first track that West recorded for Late Registration. The song went through several revisions to prior to release. Its recording sessions took place at Sony Music Studios in New York City (NYC) and Grandmaster Recording Studios in Hollywood, California, and were hosted by Andrew Dawson and Tom Biller, respectively. The track's mixing was then done at the Chalice Recording Studios in Hollywood by Mike Dean, who had assistance from Taylor Dow, Nate Connelly, and Mike Mo. For the track, West employs poignant excerpts taken from Cole's "Someone That I Used To Love". He combines hip-hop beats with a piano melody, alongside restrained electronics. West's understated record production is driven by the piano line, which uses tumbling delayed beats throughout that are laced with a synthesized bassline, in addition to subtle interjections of acoustic guitar. The soul production style that characterized The College Dropout was furthered on Late Registration by the rapper, who incorporated a much broader array of instrumentation. West opted in favor of a more symphonic orchestration to serve as a backdrop for his evolving lyricism. While elements of his trademark looped samples remained present, the album marked a shift for West towards a heavier reliance on keyboards, string sections, and boisterous yet at times haunting horns. Additionally, elongated and vibrant outros were integrated into most tracks, providing them with more time to breathe and settle into listener's ears.

On Late Registration, West progressively moves past his previous musical limitations in terms of contextualization and deployment. The song's elongated outro was arranged by Brion, who produced several of the album's tracks alongside West. Best known for his quirky, baroque pop film soundtracks like the ones for I Heart Huckabees (2004) and Punch-Drunk Love (2002), as well as his musical collaborations with singer-songwriter Fiona Apple and Aimee Mann, Brion added his melancholy touch to "Heard 'Em Say". West was exposed to Brion's work while watching the 2004 film Eternal Sunshine of the Spotless Mind, for which Brion had composed music. He had also been listening to songs Brion produced for When the Pawn... (1999), the second studio album by Fiona Apple, who was another one of the rapper's favorite artists and sources of musical inspiration for Late Registration. West was introduced to Brion via record producer Rick Rubin, a mutual friend of theirs. At the time, Brion had no background in hip-hop music nor any prior experience in creating those records. Nevertheless, he and West soon found that they could productively work together after their first afternoon in the studio, discovering that neither confined his musical knowledge and vision to a specific genre.

West commented that he appreciated the broader range of instrumentation that Brion brought to his music. The rapper went in pursuit of a more enriching sound for Late Registration. With the assistance of Brion, West widens his musical vision and expands the sound of his hip-hop production beyond his trademark sped-up soul samples. Brion integrated an entirely new third element into West's hit-making combination of soulful hooks and rhythm tracks. He supplemented a thematic, orchestral feeling to the album, elevating West's signature sound to take on a more polished package. West and Brion's collaborative work involved building melodies with synths, guitars, and other live instruments around looped samples and drum programming. West developed the beats and melodies for the album, before requesting Brion to suggest instrumental colors. Brion would then arrange the music to move in correspondence with the rhymes, pushing the musicality of uncharted hip-hop territory. Rather than simple and direct, West took a more complex, subtle musical approach when it came to composing "Heard 'Em Say". He equipped the track with session musicians, strengthening the hook while descending into a winding, progressive orchestral passage. This enabled grooves to breathe and expand in ways differing from typical rap songs.

"[Levine] added something to it, it was just like the magic, the frosting on top. And that's one of those times that God is working in the studio with you. Those are those days that he's really on his job. [...] [T]here's times with "Jesus Walks", with the blood diamonds, with "Crack Music", where I know that God is speaking through me. I know that's something he wants me to say. I know he's connecting people. He put me on that plane with Adam to bring out that song."

— West talks working with Adam Levine during an MTV interview.

Production wise, West sought out new styles in regards to his choices of sounds and musical collaborations on Late Registration. "Heard 'Em Say" features a duet between West and Levine, the latter of which's tenor singing voice punctuates the introspective tone. In a Playboy interview, West revealed that he himself sang on the original version of "Heard 'Em Say". Although he considers the imperfection of his singing to be a relatable quality, West felt in this particular case that it was hampering the track. Levine's contribution stands as one of the many guest appearances that West worked into the album. West was able to contact the singer and utilize him for a record after Rubin gave him his number. Levine had already come up with a chorus when West played the track on their way to the 2004 MTV Europe Music Awards, but was hesitant to use it because he was uncertain how his fans would feel about the R&B style, though he maintained interest in contributing to "Heard 'Em Say". Levine recalled, "He started playing me stuff on his iPod — which was far fancier than my iPod — all this new material for his record, and I was really excited about it in general. Then he played me this song that was kind of what 'Heard 'Em Say' eventually became." West expressed a similar sentiment, remembering that after he played the song, the singer stated the song reminded him "of a song that I wrote but I don't know if my band will want to do it". West finalized the situation by replying to Levine's insistence on recording the song: "Yo, we should work together." Levine also recounted, "He was just getting big too. And he played me this record. Like, 'Hey, I've got this record. Do you want to write a song together?' On a plane. You know? And I said, 'Yeah, sure.' And that was it. The next thing I knew we were in the studio making the record and it was that easy."

West was unsure about the collaboration at first, until he heard Levine rehearsing as part of Maroon 5 at the 47th Annual Grammy Awards in 2005: "They were so big that I thought they'd be less ill, but I heard them rehearsing backstage at the Grammys and he was hitting all them mockingbird notes and I said, 'I have to get him in the studio.'" The singer came to the recording studio right after the ceremony and sang the song, with West discovering that his melody fit perfectly. "Heard 'Em Say" was recorded rather quickly, as Levine had only a couple of hours available. Since the singer had a vocal that the pair had already discovered meshed well with West's track, Brion was able to translate the two pieces in a few hours. The composer explained, "Adam had something, Kanye loved it and the three of us went at it like banshees, and there it was." West distinguished the results and circumstances surrounding the collaboration as something of a gift from God. In retrospect, Levine described recording "Heard 'Em Say" by saying, "It was really a cool, organic process. Kanye's lyrics were beautiful." The musical collaboration left a strong impression of West on Levine, who opined that the rapper "is a genius", even if "he causes different reactions in people. But the bottom line is that he's brilliant. Love him or hate him, he's brilliant. He's a really pure, creative person. I really respect that about him. Everything with him is very legitimate and very real. I love that dude."

== Composition and lyrics ==
Musically, "Heard 'Em Say" is a mid-tempo hip-hop ballad that has a length of 3 minutes and 23 seconds (3:23). The elegant and simple musical composition is primarily built on piano excerpts of Cole's "Someone That I Used To Love", which are used for the cascading melody that features lush chords over tumbling delayed hip-hop beats. Alongside the beats, a parping bass synth and a few interjections of delicate acoustic guitar are present. The song harbors a soothing lullaby tone, with a moody atmosphere and soulful undertones, as well as a melodic R&B chorus and elements of art rock. It has a subdued instrumentation, which features piano chords, restrained, experimental electronics reminiscent of late-1990s post-rock, and a coda that includes various bells, whistles, and keyboards. According to the sheet music published at Musicnotes.com by Universal Music Publishing Group, the song is written in the time signature of common time, with a moderate tempo of 95 beats per minute. "Heard 'Em Say" is composed in the key of F major, while Levine's vocal range spans one octave and three notes, from a low of F♭_{4} to a high of B_{5}. The song follows a basic sequence of F_{7}–B♭_{maj7}–F_{7}–B♭_{maj7}–Faug/G–F/A–F_{6}/A–B♭/D–F_{6}/A–B♭/D during the verses and coda, and F_{7}–B♭_{maj7}–F_{7}–B♭_{maj7}–Faug/A at the chorus during its chord progression.

At the beginning of the song, the phrase "Wake up Mr. West!" and its piano melody are present. West then begins rapping his lyrics that are intertwined with a twinkling piano melody, until the composition is elevated by three additional keyboards. West raps the song's two verses and a pre-chorus, the latter of which shifts into a delicate refrain delivered by Levine, who gently croons in a falsetto. The singer's smooth tenor delivery and gentle cooing punctuate the introspective tone. Later on, additional keyboards appear as the musical composition enters an orchestral passage on the outro and Levine's vocals fade out. The outro also expresses jangling berimbau percussion, various bells, whistles, warped bass, and wailing synthesizers.

Despite sounding light-hearted, the subject matter of "Heard 'Em Say" is soulful and straight from the heart. In the introspective lyrics of the song, West laments the socioeconomical issues besetting the African-American community while reminding listeners to appreciate the present. It follows a brooding political path, with the stream-of-consciousness verses being conceptually written from the perspective of an impoverished citizen questioning the ways of the world. West illustrates the concept of an anxious youth, who are faced with a lack of opportunities and social issues, such as poverty, racism, the minimum wage, AIDS, religion, and policing. The song also highlights the condition of those in poverty watching images of rappers flaunt their material goods on television, deluded into thinking that wealth and fame are closer than they actually are. West raps with appreciation rather than arrogance, seemingly acknowledging the success he achieved with The College Dropout. As the opening track of Late Registration, "Heard 'Em Say" reiterates themes established on its predessecor, including West's gratitude for still being alive, brutal honesty, and faith in God. Essentially, it is a "mournfully contemplative" number, which discusses maintaining honesty in a world that lacks this quality.

== Release and promotion ==
On August 30, 2005, "Heard 'Em Say" was included as the first full track on West's second studio album Late Registration, preceded by the intro "Wake Up Mr. West". The song was issued on a 12" vinyl in the United States by Roc-A-Fella and Def Jam as the third single from Late Registration on October 24, 2005, with fellow album track "Touch the Sky" as the B-side. On November 1, "Heard 'Em Say" was sent to US mainstream radio stations by the aforementioned labels. It was later released for digital download on March 1, 2006.

"Heard 'Em Say" was one of the tracks that West played while hosting a listening session for the album at Sony Music Studios on June 15, 2005. The session was held in a small room for a large crowd, which included fellow rappers Common and Lil' Kim, and West played a guessing game in which he asked the attendees who was on the song's hook. One of them guessed it was Smokey Robinson, though West confirmed Levine to be the performer of the hook. He clarified that he chose to work with the singer because it was "ill" and "keeping it real", yet recalled people being surprised by their collaboration. The rapper also revealed that after Levine added his vocals to "Heard 'Em Say" and "girls start liking the record", he selected it as the album's third single. At the time of the listening event, Late Registration had not been finished, nor were all of the completed songs previewed and some were not played in their entirety. Nevertheless, West declared that he wanted to take the opportunity "to play [the album] and show off" his work.

== Critical reception ==
"Heard 'Em Say" was met with widespread acclaim from music critics. Billboard writer Marco Cibola saw the song as representative of West's musical growth on the album, opining that its keys "twinkle a bit brighter" than any of the material on The College Dropout. Likewise, Murjani Rawls from Substream Magazine stated that the soulful undertones of "Heard 'Em Say" marked a different type of inspiration for West. While maintaining the belief that Late Registration has its misfires, Kyle Ryan of The A.V. Club declared that these are outweighed by stronger moments like the song, complimenting its "elegant simplicity". The staff of Virgin Media rated the song four stars out of five, observing "an accomplished piece of production". They commented that the "poignant sample" of "Someone That I Used To Love" is used for "the cascading piano melody" throughout, accompanied by "tumbling delayed beats, a parping bass synth", and hints of a "subtle acoustic guitar". At The Village Voice, veteran critic Robert Christgau concurred with this sentiment, approving of the complex yet subtle musicality of the composition, highlighting the Chinese bells and berimbau. Bansky Gonzalez from Uproxx remarked that the record's sonic versatility provides "an exhilarating ride", distinguishing the song as "somber and painstakingly thoughtful". In the Music Times, Joey DeGroot named "Heard 'Em Say" as being one of a few hip-hop songs that he considers to be "straight up beautiful". He compared it to the 1994 tracks "C.R.E.A.M." by Wu-Tang Clan, "One Love" by Nas, and "Juicy" by the Notorious B.I.G. Writing for The Fader, Amos Barshad cited the track as being among a "suite of nested aural pleasures" on the album, asserting that the "delicate plinking" and Levine's feature were "undercut with the bitter sting of a politicized shoulder shrug". Time music critic Josh Tyrangiel listed "Heard 'Em Say" as one of the three best tracks on Late Registration. He characterized it as an "atmospheric ballad" that demonstrates "the stealthy power of West's storytelling".

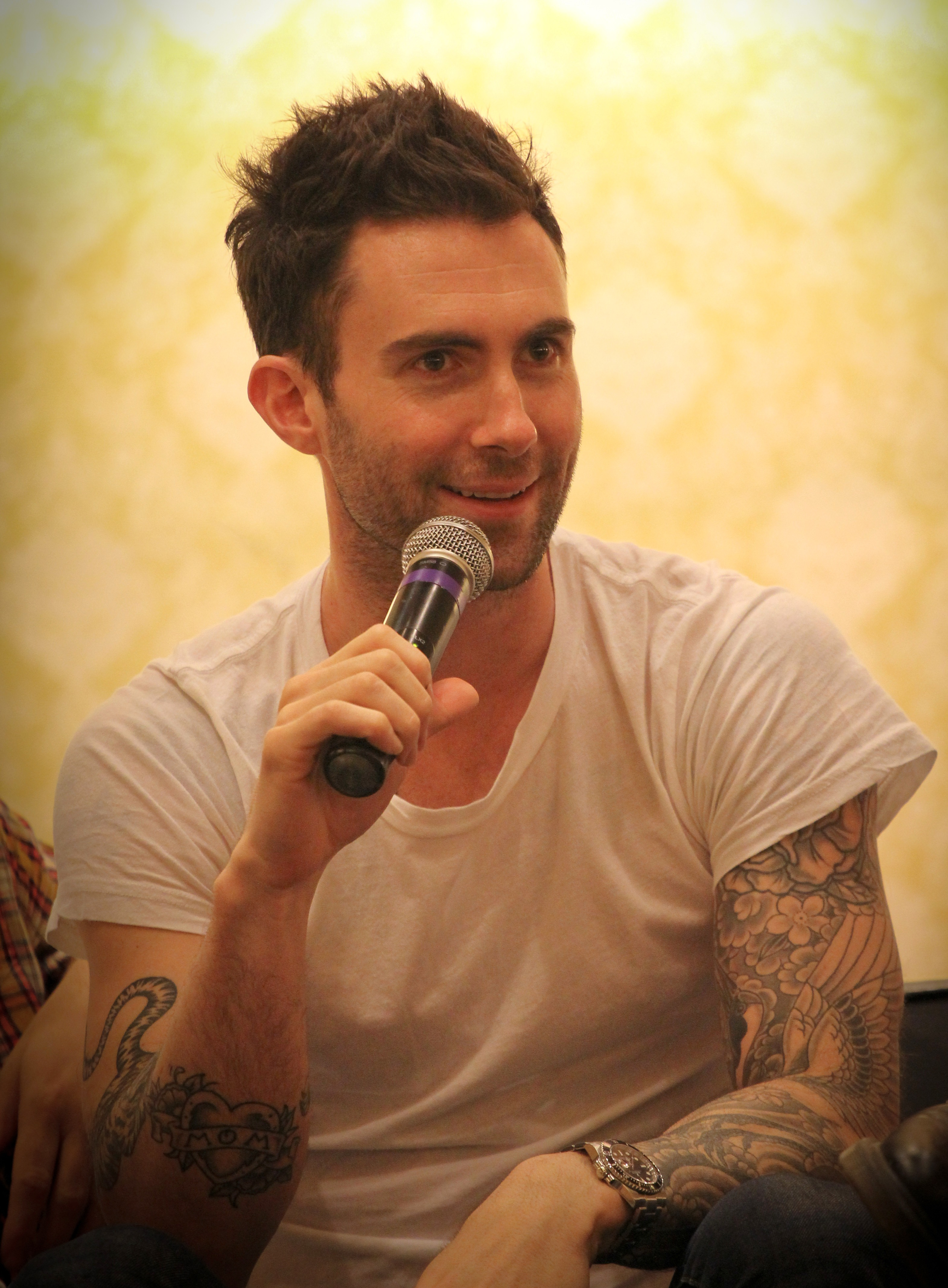
Levine garnered acclaim from multiple commentators for his performance on the chorus.

Steve Jones from USA Today highlighted how Levine's "smooth tenor" punctuates the introspective song. Sean Fennessey, for Pitchfork, remarked that the track "might be the most bandied about joint" on the album due to Levine's presence, though mentioned he "sounds great". Fennessey affirmed that while he is off-key and "blue-eyed selling his soul", Levine's "syrupy pop works" like the majority of the album's risks. Jozen Cummings of PopMatters summarized the song by saying the "sweet piano chords and Levine's gentle cooing" make it "probably the best hip-hop lullaby" since Slick Rick's "Children's Story" (1989). Ross Bonaime from Paste asserted that Levine's contribution to "Heard 'Em Say" might be one of the best things the singer has ever done, while calling the song "a soothing lullaby with some bite". Stereogum's Michael Nelson was impressed by the "beautiful and understated opener" managing "to wring actual human emotion" out of the "hit-making robot" Levine. For Slate, Ben Mathis-Lilley affirmed that the singer "has an indisputably fantastic voice for the wistful soul of 'Heard 'Em Say'". Slant Magazine reviewer Vadim Rizov saw "Heard 'Em Say" as a "vulnerable song" that redeemed Maroon 5. Eric Henderson from the same publication likened Levine's delicate delivery of the chorus to a "butterfly singing". Rolling Stone senior writer Brian Hiatt positively compared his performance to the work of Stevie Wonder. Cat Warner from Capital Xtra complimented the usage of his polished vocals and implored listeners: "Turn this up loud."

On behalf of MSN Music, writer Sam Greszes quipped that the "bitingly political and scathing collaboration between Adam Levine and Kanye West" leaves nothing "not to like". Chris Deville of Stereogum described "Heard 'Em Say" as a "gorgeously graceful opening song", in which West's rhetoric comes across as controversial. HipHopDX's Ural Garret encapsulated the song's verses as "an in-depth introspective look into everyday hood aspirations" and credited West's songwriting for feeling grounded. Alex Heigl, for People, commended West's lyrical skill, noting that he offers a "clear-eyed, sober look at poverty and income inequality". Greg Cochrane from NME declared that "boast[ing] a trilogy of brilliance like 'Heard Em Say,' 'Touch The Sky' and 'Gold Digger'" makes Late Registration "a winner".

=== Accolades ===
Pitchfork named "Heard 'Em Say" the 10th best song of 2005, with Fennessey opining that West pulls off the tough task of making Levine sound like Stevie Wonder, alongside praising the composition and the rapper's lyricism. It was nominated for Best Hip-Hop Song Collaboration at the 2006 Groovevolt Music and Fashion Awards. In 2015, a columnist from Paste bestowed "Heard 'Em Say" with much acclaim and ranked it as West's 53rd best album track, declaring: "Late Registration starts with Kanye waking up, but 'Heard 'Em Say' plays like a soothing lullaby with some bite to it." The following year, Complex named the track as West's 82nd best song, writing that the "luscious piano chords" are accompanied by Levine "gently crooning" and even though the song sounds like "a hip-hop lullaby, Kanye was kicking that real shit" with its content. It was pointed to by Capital Xtra as one of the 18 songs "for fans who miss the old Kanye".

== Commercial performance ==
In the US, the song entered the US Billboard Hot 100 at the last position for the issue date of October 29, 2005. West's previous single "Gold Digger" was atop the Hot 100 at the time of the entry, giving him the rare coincidental feat of bookending the chart. The rapper stands as the seventh artist to score this achievement as of September 17, 2010; a mere .003% of the 2,721 weekly Hot 100 charts up to this point had been bookened by an artist. The song also marked Levine's first appearance on the chart outside of Maroon 5 material, while becoming a significant crossover success for both West and the singer. It peaked at number 26 on the Hot 100 for the issue date of December 17, 2005, remaining at this position for two weeks. The song lasted for 16 weeks on the chart. "Heard 'Em Say" debuted at number 49 on the US Hot R&B/Hip-Hop Songs simultaneously with its Hot 100 entry and later peaked at number 17 on the issue dated December 31, 2005. The song further reached numbers 12 and 36 on the US Hot Rap Songs and Pop 100 charts, respectively. On September 23, 2020, "Heard 'Em Say" was certified platinum by the Recording Industry Association of America (RIAA) for pushing 1,000,000 certified units in the US.

The song was most successful in Finland, charting at number 10 on the Official Finnish Singles Chart. "Heard 'Em Say" peaked at number 23 on the Irish Singles Chart. In the United Kingdom, "Heard 'Em Say" performed similarly by debuting and peaking at number 22 on the UK Singles Chart. Overall, the song spent 14 weeks on the chart. On August 12, 2022, the song was awarded a silver certification by the British Phonographic Industry (BPI) for shelving 200,000 units in the UK. Elsewhere, it entered the New Zealand Singles Chart at number 15. The song experienced lesser success in Australia, reaching number 27 on the ARIA Singles Chart.

== Music videos ==
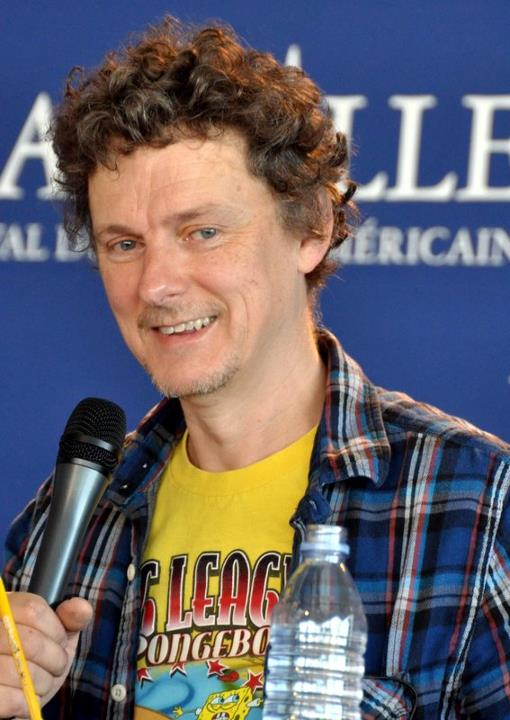
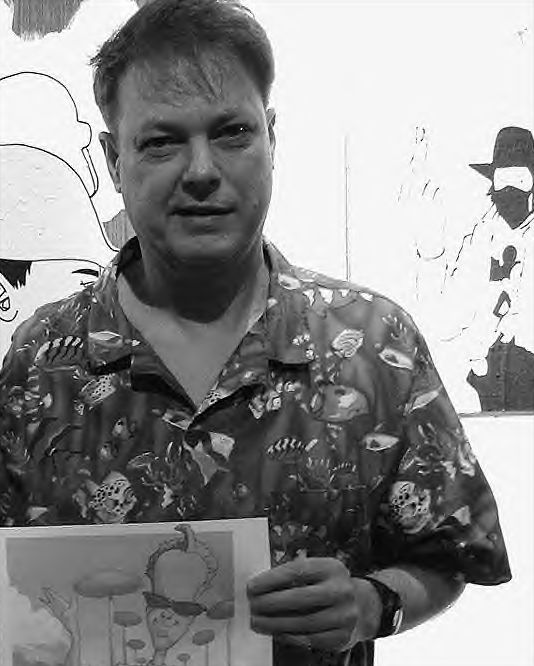
The original music video for "Heard 'Em Say" was directed by French film director Michel Gondry (left). The alternate video was co-directed by American cartoonist Bill Plympton (right).

=== Background ===
As was the case with West's 2004 single "Jesus Walks", more than one music video was produced to accompany the song. Filmed overnight in Macy's flagship department store on 34th Street in NYC, West enlisted Michel Gondry and Joe DeMaio to direct the original music video for "Heard 'Em Say", a live-action visual. Because the single was originally planned to be released for Christmas, Gondry directed the clip inside a Macy's store during the winter season in NYC. Despite shooting the visual being highly expensive, West was unsatisfied with the results and commissioned Bill Plympton to create a new music video in one week. The animated music video expresses the use of raw, hand-drawn animation that West said he used for something new and "refreshing", as well as to express "how natural the song feels, how organic the song is" through a video.

The first version of the music video for "Heard 'Em Say" was filmed live-action by Gondry. In the video, West plays a homeless man watching over three fictional children, who sneak into Macy's and stay overnight. Gondry had become well known for his innovative music videos, including ones for the White Stripes and Björk, and his film Eternal Sunshine of the Spotless Mind. The director started out directing small music videos in Paris, after which he spent decades constantly renewing ideas to become famous. West was the one who took the initiative to track Gondry down, insisting that they work together. According to Gondry, West begged him to work a music video for two years before he eventually accepted. Even though "Heard 'Em Say" marked the first music video directed by Gondry for West, it was not the first time that the two had collaborated with each other. West had provided a live performance during his appearance in Gondry's 2005 documentary film Dave Chappelle's Block Party. In addition, the director played live drums on "Diamonds From Sierra Leone", the lead single for Late Registration. However, it was the first collaboration between Levine and Gondry. Levine imparted, "I've been dying to work with him forever. I was just blown away that I got the opportunity. Then I read the treatment and I found out that I would being a little bit of, you know, video acting, which is funny."

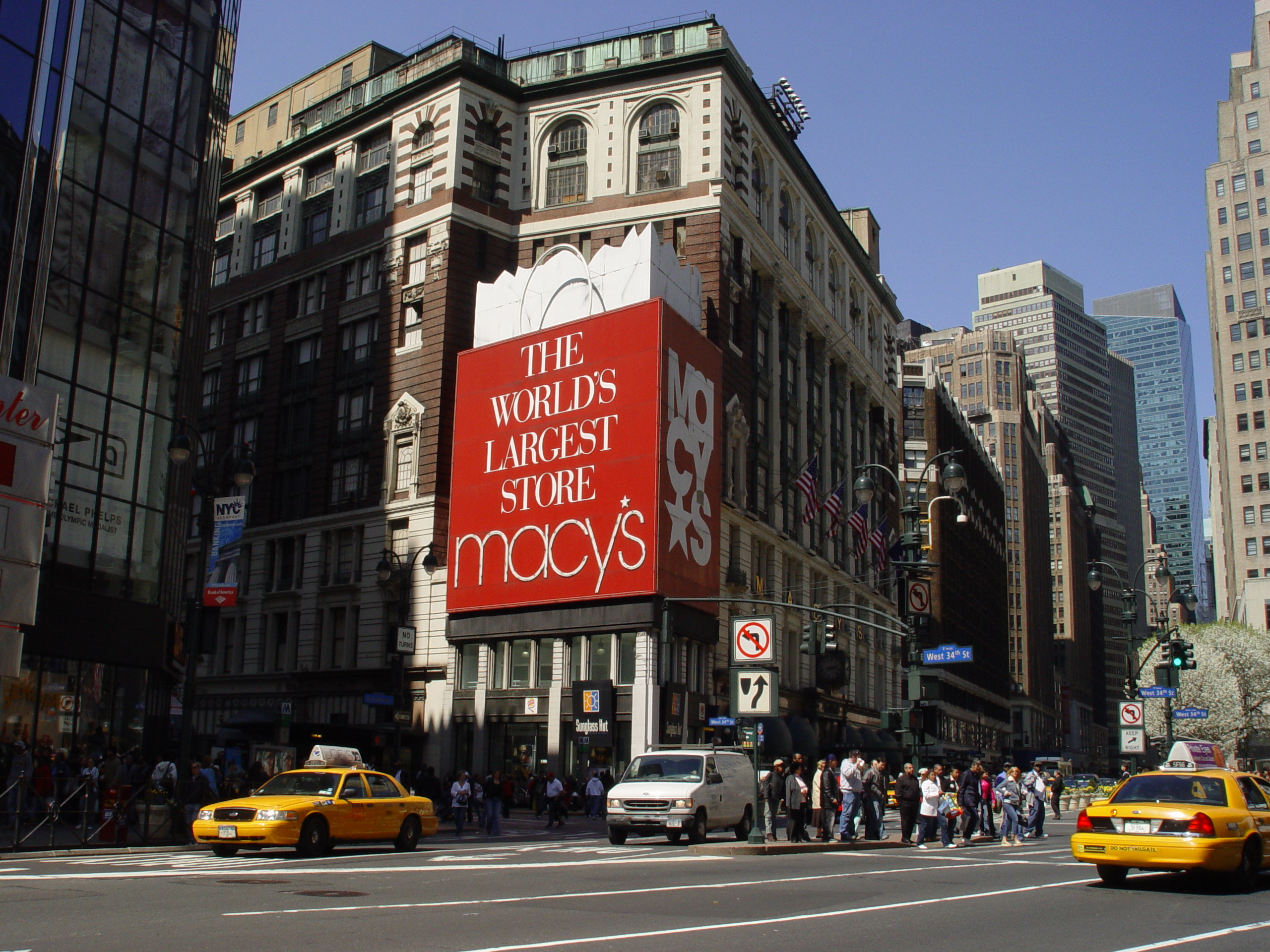
The original music video was shot in live-action and filmed inside Herald Square Macy's, the company's flagship department store on 34th Street in New York City (NYC).

The filming of the music video took place in October 2005 at Macy's Herald Square, the flagship of the department stores chain. The visual was filmed inside the store while it was closed down for the night, with work being done over this period. Regarding his role, Levine recalled, "This sounds weird, but it's kind of a surrealistic Christmas world that Macy's becomes. I let Kanye and his family in, after hours, to spend the night. And he's got three kids with him and they're running around and I'm chasing them. It's so weird! There's dancing suits in the men's section, all kinds of craziness, but I'm excited about it." On his part, West had little rehearsal time due to being scheduled for various public appearances. He was set to perform the very next day at the University of Miami Convocation Center in Miami, Florida, for the kickoff of his Touch the Sky Tour (2005–06).

West reportedly provided Gondry with $500,000 for the music video's production budget. Gondry, who has said that he prefers "to be more in the physical world", created the video with basic technology by stylistically molding objects. He filmed it frame-by-frame, shooting by recranking the camera and re-exposing the film various times. Utilizing his signature special effects, Gondry created a fantasy world inspired by the 1964 film Mary Poppins, situated inside a department store where inanimate objects and appliances come to life. Gondry declared that doing fanciful high-budget conceptual music videos is not his main occupation, saying he does ones with "zero budget" a lot more than those with an average budget. Working with a large budget, he gave the visual a slick, colorful treatment. Gondry originally wanted to fill a department store with homeless people, a "hardcore" idea that led to West desiring something "more family-oriented, something sweet". The result was a high-concept video depicting West having fun with fictional children inside a deserted Macy's store, for which Levine transformed into a security guard. West personally found the original concept too hardcore, having concerns it may "alienate his audience" during the Christmas season. The video aired in the US on the week of December 19, 2005.

Regarding the shoot, Levine described it as "an experience, culturally — and being there doing what we were doing was just so fun. It's inspirational to push yourself past what you're used to. It's nice to be a little bit uncomfortable if it can yield more interesting, unique results." However, West changed his mind about the video less than two weeks to prior to its due date at MTV. When the release date for the single was pushed back to a later date, he actually decided to drop the music video. West dismissed Gondry, choosing to contact a different type of filmmaker in Plympton. Gondry claims that West shot a second video due to being overwhelmed by his indecision regarding the first. The director said that despite West's unhappiness with the results, the two remained fans of each other, remarking, "His music is amazing." West would eventually send a message to Gondry expressing his adoration of his music video.

The second music video for "Heard 'Em Say" features extensive use of hand-drawn animation. According to West, the visuals express "how natural the song feels, how organic the song is". West commissioned Plympton for the alternate video. The Oscar-nominated cartoonist had become well known for the body-morphing animated short films 25 Ways to Quit Smoking and How to Kiss that were shown on MTV in the late 1980s, as well as his debut animated film Your Face (1987). Simultaneously, Plympton was also working on the half-hour documentary on the 1786 Shays' Rebellion in Massachusetts for The History Channel and a clip for singer "Weird Al" Yankovic's "Don't Download This Song". The music video for "Heard 'Em Say" was the third Plympton had done, while arguably the most high-profile one. The artwork of Plympton's cartoons has often harbored a warped, morbid aspect, which he defended by calling himself a "normal guy" that does "crazy artwork" while asserting those who create "normal artwork are crazy". West felt that his generally naive, whimsical style of illustrations complemented his idiosyncratic artistry. The rapper had loved Plympton's work since his youth, saying that his images were important to him as a child and expressing curiosity about his creative process. West remembered seeing Plympton's films in Chicago when he was young, having watched them at the Spike & Mike and Tournée of Animation shows. He very much appreciated the films and selected Plympton's name out of them. West and Plympton later collaborated to create Through the Wire: Lyrics and Illuminations (2009), a book filled with illustrations based on the rapper's song lyrics.

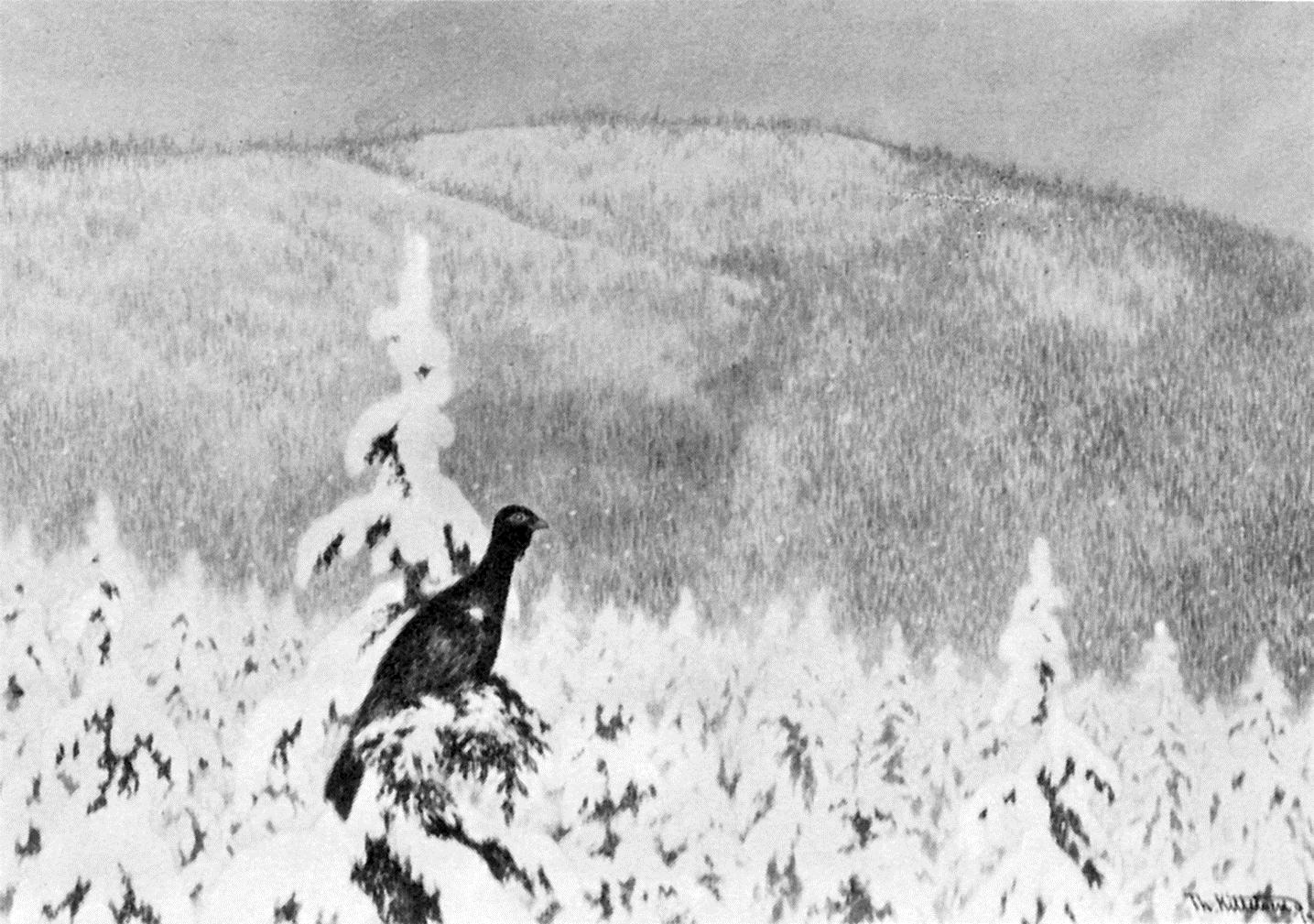
The raw, smudgy visuals of the alternate video for "Heard 'Em Say" utilize hand-drawn animation.

During a 2015 interview with The Daily Beast, Plympton spoke for the first time about working with West on the music video. Plympton had known West was a very popular hip-hop artist, but lacked awareness of his true level of fame. The night after attending an October 2005 exhibition for the art of German illustrator Heinz Edelmann at the School of Visual Arts, he received a phone call from the rapper. Plympton recalled, "Three or four years ago, [West] called me out of the blue and said, 'I need a music video. Will you do one for me?'" West also asked, "Is this Bill Plympton? This is Kanye West. Are you the animator guy? I want to hire you to do my next music video." Plympton ultimately agreed to shoot a video, saying: "Yeah, sure." According to Plympton, Gondry's music video "wasn't exactly what Kanye wanted" and he sought out a creative take, recruiting the director for one more to his liking. West needed to premiere the second music video on MTV in a week, a period that Plympton managed to create it in. The rapper instructed Plympton to spend a low amount of money on the video, after Gondry had used his budget of $500,000 on his version. Plympton agreed to this and delivered a storyboard of how he visualized the narrative, which West adored. The director recalled that West travelled to his studio for two days, looking over "my shoulder as I was drawing" and criticizing the work. Plympton however understood West's viewpoint because he had the right to criticize after paying him a lot of money; he complied with the rapper's statement, "I look more handsome than that – make me more handsome!" He further spoke of West: "He has really a lot of talent in terms of design and visual flourishes and I respect him so I did what he asked me to do." After Plympton discovered that West had been watching his animated comedy film I Married a Strange Person! (1997) in his spare time and expressed fond memories of attending one of his concerts, the two began the shoot. To visually capture the tone of "Heard 'Em Say", Plympton portrayed West as a taxicab driver in a fictitious city, where he picks up troubled passengers, such as a young child and his mother. Plympton explained that the youngster "is meant to represent Kanye as a young boy and the film is about his experiences" and on the other hand, he desired "the mother to be very sexy, so we did that, too".

Plympton described working with West as being quite different from working with Weird Al Yankovic. He imparted from an honest standpoint that "Weird Al doesn't have a big budget for his music videos. He kind of just said, 'Here's a song. Send me the film when you're done.' Whereas Kanye was very hands-on." Plympton assured that West is "a real showman", even compared to the singer. He continued, "And he was always curious. He would call me from all over the place: 'Oh Bill, I'm watching I Married a Strange Person right now. How did you do this and that?'" As the premiere date neared, Plympton worked over the weekend with Biljana, Lisa, and Kerry. Afterwards, West came by and fine-tuned all of the art. Plympton revealed that West wanted to close the music video with a scene showing his character visiting the pearly gates to Heaven, which he turned down. The director informed West that due to having only one day of filming left, shooting the gates correctly "would be almost impossible", an explanation he understood. In the end, they narrowly made the deadline for the video, with West paying Plympton out of his pocket. As a show of generosity, West insisted on Plympton adding an animated credit for himself at the end of the music video. During the video's release party, West dubbed the director as the "Michael Jordan of Animation".

The music video was debuted for Channel 4 in the UK on November 12, 2005, while it aired on MTV's Total Request Live nine days later. West's creative involvement left a good impression for Plympton, who said that he heavily respects him and trusted his opinion. The director declared that West is "a smart guy" and "very visual", mentioning his potential to be a theatre director. Plympton later presented the video for the sold-out second annual New York Comic Con at the Javits Convention Center on February 23, 2007. After offering a brief summary of his career, including his childhood drawings and his time working as an editorial cartoonist, Plympton initiated the program by screening the video. He explained how West believed "Gondry's piece was too wimpy", telling Plympton that he "had one week to do it and Gondry had spent all the money".

=== Synopsis ===
West and his children depicted in the original live-action music video, and him shown with a mother and her young boy in the alternate animated video, pictured top and bottom, respectively.

The visually elaborate live-action music video for "Heard 'Em Say" harbors a distinct Christmas theme. Gondry created a surrealistic story set inside the Herald Square Macy's store, which is fantasy styled. West plays a homeless single father monitoring his three fictional children, who sneak into the store and stay overnight sometime around the Christmas season. Levine plays the role of a guard, granting entry to West and his children after store opening hours. They spend time overnight in the store, which turns into a magical playground. West and the children make the most of their time, running around the area as Levine sings his lines on "Heard 'Em Say" and chases them. West does some shopping while the youngsters play around the store, which comes to life. Within the store, suits dance in the Men's section, Christmas dinners are cooked, sofa beds fold and unfold to the rhythm of the music, a continuous race track comes together piece-by-piece in seconds, and the children drive around on a police bed only to be confronted by the security guard. A cameo appearance is made by Brion, who plays the song's piano melody on a miniature piano in the toy section.

With the alternate video, Plympton managed to fully reproduce the visuals that West had in mind, echoing the tone of the song. Messy, hand-drawn animation is utilized in the video, appearing at numerous points. The black-and-white visuals harbor a mixture of fantasy and reality, conveying a setting that is both whimsical and dreary. West's verses are translated into a faithful rendition of cartoon vignettes, with unique flourishes characteristic of Plympton's style. The rapper is depicted as a mythical underpaid urban driver of an oversized taxicab, picking up passengers that include a mother and her young boy, the latter of whom represents him as a child. The child traverses a depressing urban landscape, becoming aware of the harsh realities of the US on his journey. His eyes are drawn with exaggerated largeness as he looks at advertisements of diamonds and jewelry. Sequences of the child are interspersed with footage of West and Levine providing vocal performances, appearing behind an all-white background. The video also features completely literal and animated interpretations of selected lyrics from the song, while West morphes into both Jesus and the devil as they are mentioned in his lines.

The video begins with a wealthy woman and her pet poodle exiting West's taxicab. Upon requesting his tip, she offers him a nickel. The next scene focuses on a small family of chain smokers, showing a young boy packing his suitcase with the aid of his mother and grandmother, both of whom have cigarettes in their mouths. The visual narrative follows West transporting the child and his mother. A long stream of heavy smoke follows the child and his mother, who enter West's cab and travel through the fictional city as he continues picking up passengers. Throughout the video, the child's wide, impressionable eyes express his developing social sense as he observes the world that he sees around him, trying to comprehend and copy it. The cab eventually arrives at a fuel station and as the mother runs in there to purchase lottery tickets, the child spots her cigarettes on the cab seat and grabs them. He tries one and then throws the lit match out of the window into a nearby puddle of gasoline. The car erupts in flames, resulting in the boy and West dying. It shoots up into the sky, where West and the child grow pairs of angel wings each. Following the boy's death, his mother is left to dwell in anguish on Earth as he moves on and remains in Heaven. Meanwhile, West's angel returns to Earth to continue his job as a cab driver, a living purgatory of sorts.

=== Reception ===
Amid Amidi of Cartoon Brew was not impressed by "Gondry's slick, candy-colored treatment" for the first music video, commenting that it heavily misses the point of "Heard 'Em Say" and merely screams, "Look, how big my budget was!" The second music video was very well received by critics. A writer for New York called the video "excellent". John Hugar from Uproxx declared that the visual features a juxtaposition he found intriguing, remarking, "It's a fascinating mixture of fantasy and reality that manages to be whimsical and dreary at the same time". Amidi asserted that it adds an "entirely new layer of meaning and effect to the song", noting that the hand-drawn animation expresses the earthy tone more honestly than the first music video. He also wrote that hand-drawn animation is suddenly "hip and exciting" instead of computer animation, welcoming "the raw messy esthetic of Plympton's drawing style" as a "change of pace" from the "endless parade of mathematically perfect CG models and animation", finalizing the video as a proper example of the technique from someone like West who is intelligent enough to know its strengths and the appropriate places for usage.

At the 2006 Music Video Production Awards, the first music video won the award for Best Hip-Hop Video. On their 2018 list of West's best music videos, Complex placed it at number 13, with the staff writing, "The fantasy world of the department store perfectly embodies the nostalgic yet uplifting sounds of the track." The second video was popular in the press, garnering much airplay on MTV and BET. On Complex's list of West's best videos, the visual was ranked at number 31.

=== Personnel ===
==== Live-action video ====
Sources:

- Michel Gondry – director
- Peter Sluszka – animation director
- Partizan Entertainment – production company
- Julie Fong – executive producer
- Ivan Abel – stop motion DP
- Julianna Cox – additional animator
- Tim MacDonald – props & rigging
- Blanca Li – choreographer
- Heidi Bivens – wardrobe stylist
- Roc-A-Fella – record label
- Island Def Jam – record label

==== Animated video ====
Sources:

- Bill Plympton – director, animator
- Joe DeMaio – director
- Roc-A-Fella – record label

== Live performances ==
A remote performance of "Heard 'Em Say" taped in Los Angeles was broadcast on a video screen in Foxborough, Massachusetts for an audience of over 40,000 fans during a pre-game concert held on September 3, 2005, at Gillette Stadium. After Maroon 5 played their 2002 single "Harder to Breathe", West performed on a red-white-and-blue stage, which received a poor audience response. On September 29, 2005, West performed the song with John Legend delivering piano and the chorus at Abbey Road Studios in London for his first live album Late Orchestration (2006), with contributions from DJ A-Trak. Two days later, West appeared with Levine as a musical guest on the season premiere of Saturday Night Live (SNL), for which they performed the song together backed by a live orchestra. For the performance, West wore a brown leather jacket and white-framed sunglasses, reminiscent of an outfit he had recently worn at the 2005 MTV Video Music Awards. West performed the song at Santa Monica High School on December 5 for a concert promoting higher education, sponsored by his eponymous charity foundation. He included "Heard 'Em Say" on the setlist of his Touch the Sky Tour (2005–06). On December 3, 2005, Levine joined West onstage to sing his portion of the song for the tour's stop at Universal City, California.

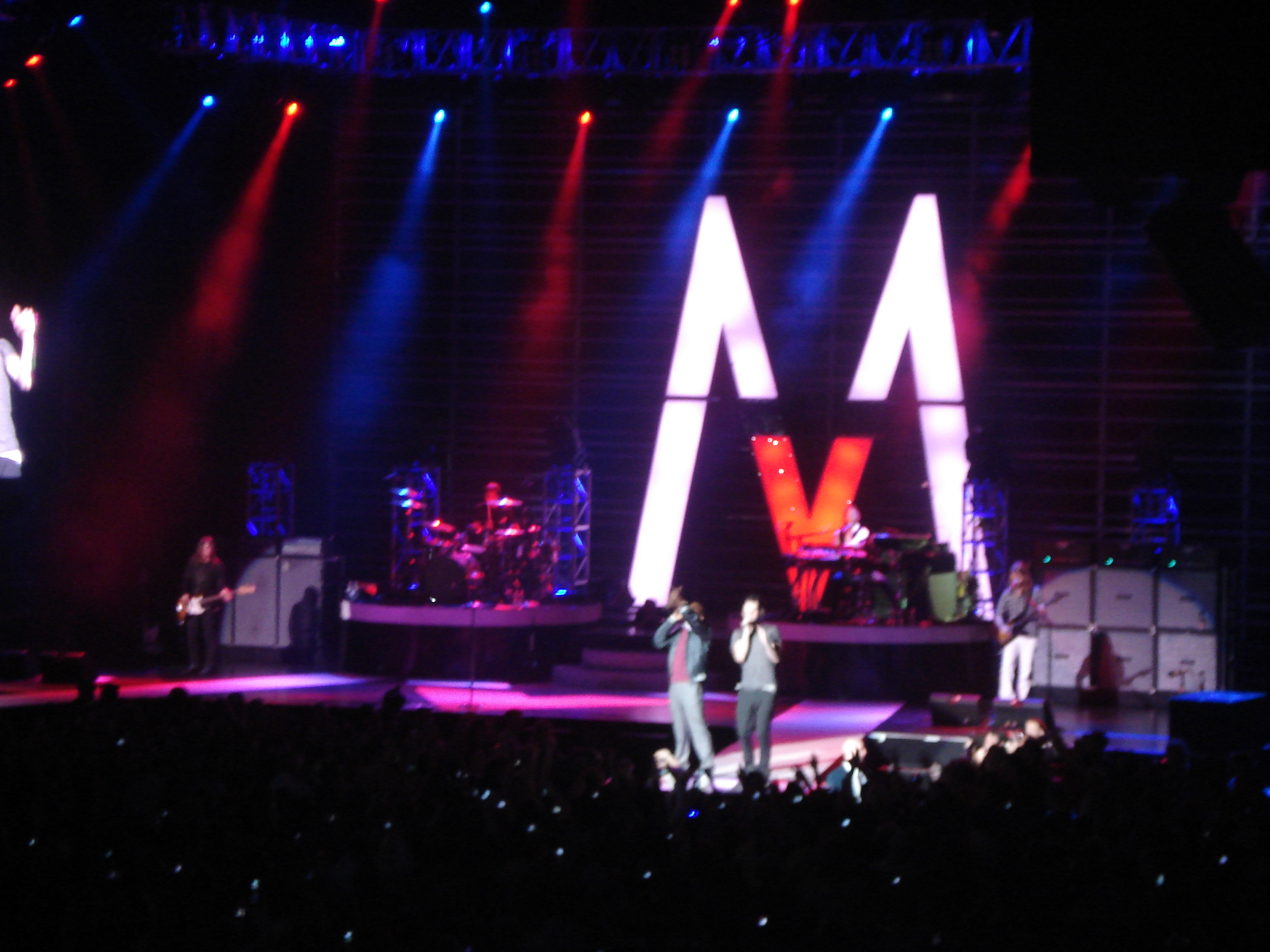
West performing a medley of the songs "Nothing Lasts Forever" and "Heard 'Em Say" with Maroon 5 on October 10, 2007, at Madison Square Garden in NYC.

West performed the song for a pre-game concert held during VH1's Pepsi Smash Super Bowl Bash on February 2, 2006. Wearing a Detroit Pistons jacket and accompanied by a seven-piece string orchestra, two backup singers, and a DJ, he introduced "Heard 'Em Say" by telling the audience it was "my favorite song I ever worked on". West provided a performance of "Heard 'Em Say" at St. James Theatre in Auckland, New Zealand on March 17, 2006, which was well received by the audience. He wore a glittery Adidas jacket and large sci-fi shades, before pausing to change into a bolero jacket and switching to a preppy white shirt later on. West presented an embellished live arrangement, utilizing a string section, back-up singers, and a DJ, with accompaniment from Common. West performed the song at the 2006 Coachella Festival, for which he wore a T-shirt in tribute to Miles Davis, jeans, and a red bandana. With backing from a DJ and two additional singers, West performed "Heard 'Em Say" for KIIS-FM's Wango Tango concert on May 8. During his headlining concert on the second day of Lollapalooza 2006 in his hometown of Chicago, West delivered a performance of the song to an audience of 60,000 people, which included scratches by A-Trak. West jumped across the stage at Live Earth 2007 as he performed a medley of eight hits, beginning with "Heard 'Em Say". On October 10, while Maroon 5 was playing "Nothing Lasts Forever" at a sold-out concert inside Madison Square Garden in NYC, Levine announced that he was to introduce "a good friend" to the stage, followed by a surprise guest appearance from West. To the delight of the audience, the two segued into a live rendition of "Heard 'Em Say".

West included "Heard 'Em Say" as the third number of the set list for his Glow in the Dark Tour, which began on April 16, 2008, at the KeyArena in Seattle, Washington. For the start of a stop at the Nokia Theatre in Los Angeles on the tour, he was pulled to a standing position as the opening strains of "Wake Up Mr. West" from Late Registration played. This was followed a computer named Jane informing West that the Earth had lost all its creativity and he needed to save the human race from a banal existence. The various compositions performed by West served to form a space opera storyline that details the story of how a stranded space traveler struggles for over a year making attempts to escape from a distant planet while on a creative mission. He performed on a small, elaborate stage that was spread into a desert sand dune shrouded in billowing smoke before an enormous LED screen depicting a skyline where shooting stars reappear as pumping blue cells, the latter of which appeared for the song. West spent the entire performance onstage alone, rapping and singing the lyrics as his band played in a pit at the foot of the sloping stage. Like most songs from West's early albums, "Heard 'Em Say" was provided an electronic rendition that integrated with both the synthesizer quality of tracks from his third studio album Graduation (2007) and the sci-fi theme of his conceptual concert. He wore jeans, a sweater with one missing sleeve, shoulder pads, and a red windbreaker tied around his waist for the performance.

Near the end of the Glow in the Dark Tour's North American leg, West performed the song for a crowd of around 100,000 during the final night of Lollapalooza in Chicago that he headlined on August 3, 2008. The live venue was a slightly more stripped-down version of his standard Glow in the Dark Tour concert. Even though the high-budget stage did not feature holograms or lunar landscapes, it was still equipped with blinding strobes, moody lighting, and rolling fog. He performed with a space-age backing band, consisting of a percussionist/DJ setup, robo-suited guitarists, and futuristic female singers wearing foot-high shoulder pads. "Heard 'Em Say" was among the songs performed by West during a 90-minute set when he headlined the 2008 Global Gathering festival, becoming the very first hip-hop artist to do so. After teasing the audience with a snippet of his 2007 track "Stronger", West appeared in a cloud of smoke and delivered the performance. He performed to a crowd of 50,000, wearing a black jacket and a bright T-shirt.

A live rendition of "Heard 'Em Say" was performed during West's secret black-tie show at The Box nightclub on Chrystie Street in Manhattan, NYC on August 13, 2010. The rapper held the late-night function that he dubbed "Rosewood", accompanied by Legend and performing to slightly over 200 select attendees for 90 minutes. A simplistic stage set-up was used, which consisted of a baby grand piano that Legend sat at, a Roland TR-808 drum machine, a keyboard, and two microphones that include one utilized solely for Auto-Tune. After they opened with a performance of West's 2008 single "Homecoming", he instructed Legend to take it back to old times, leading into them performing the song. As their duet progressed, the singer started slowly stroking the piano keys and singing Marvin Gaye and Tammi Terrell's "If This World Were Mine" (1967). On October 19, 2013, West performed "Heard 'Em Say" as part of an encore for The Yeezus Tour's kickoff show at the KeyArena. During the performance, West wore a black mask and stopped rapping at points. On January 6, 2019, the first Sunday of the year, West and his group Sunday Service Choir performed a gospel rendition of "Heard 'Em Say" to open the first installment of the group's weekly concerts. For the performance, blue and red lighting shined down while the Sunday Service Choir bounced and clapped as they wore Yeezy jumpsuits.

== Cover versions and other usage ==
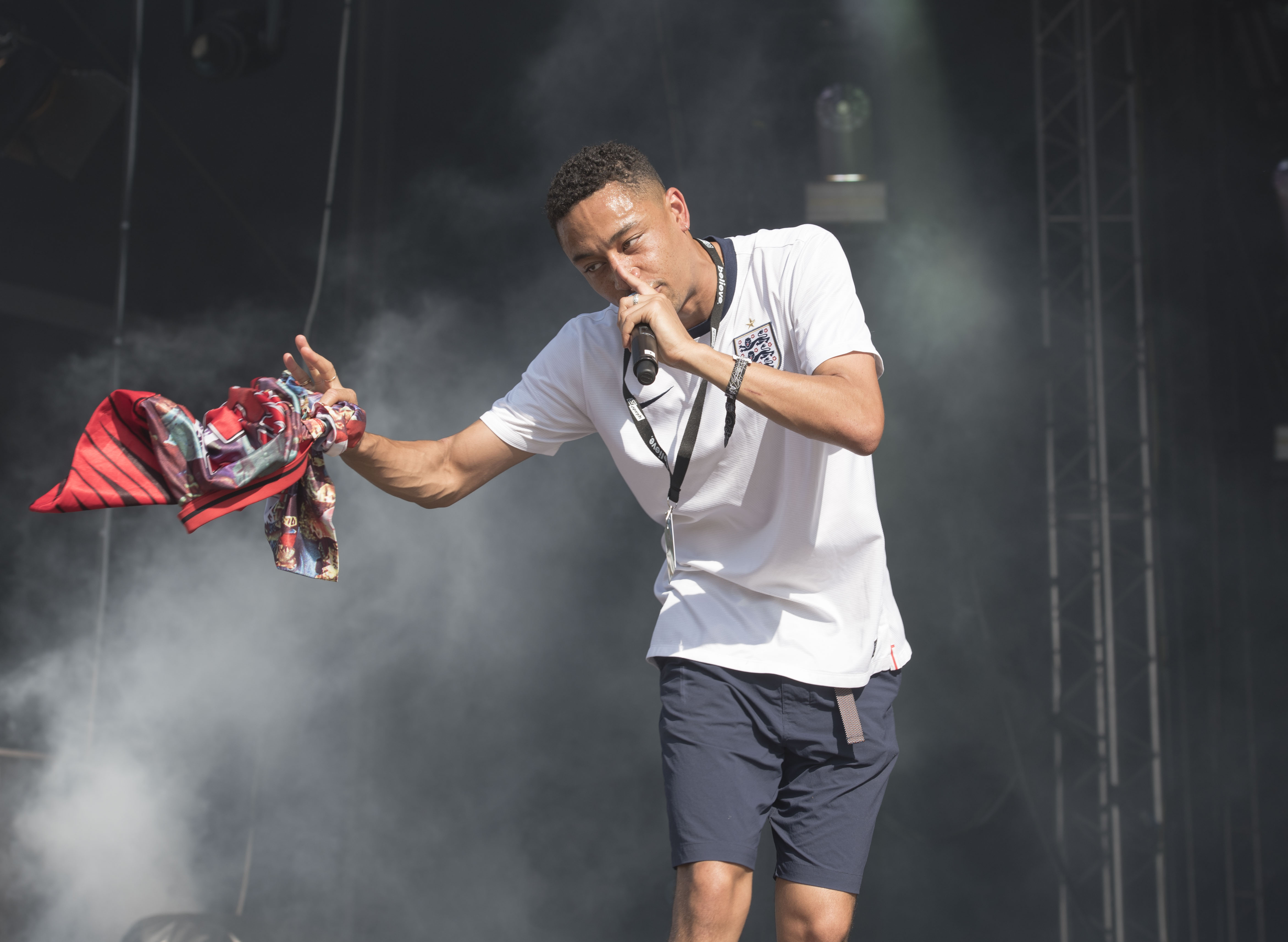
Loyle Carner performed a live rendition of "Heard 'Em Say" during BBC Radio 1 Piano Sessions.

Jesse Boone released a cover of "Heard 'Em Say" for his 18th birthday in 2013, marking the first number he recorded. This gave birth to his rap stage name of Huey Supreme, a combination of a high school nickname and an Xbox Live username. Rapper G-Eazy performed a cover of "Heard 'Em Say" for BBC Radio 1Xtra's Live Lounge on March 15, 2016. For the chorus, G-Eazy enlisted English singer-songwriter Anne-Marie in place of Levine. The cover was faithful to the original, apart from the rapper adding in a few censors and a line, "From the Bay, like 40 and Dre." Alongside the performance, G-Eazy dubbed West "the greatest".

Having sung on the original "Heard 'Em Say", Levine later appropriated the refrain for Maroon 5's "Nothing Lasts Forever", which was released on their second studio album It Won't Be Soon Before Long in 2007. English hip-hop artist Loyle Carner performed a stripped-down rendition of "Heard 'Em Say" as the last number of his two-track live set for BBC Radio 1's Piano Sessions on October 7, 2015, presented by Huw Stephens. Carner added a British touch to the song and reworked the lyrics in a personal style, delivering an ode to his mother. Australian comedian and rapper Matt Okine performed a version of "Heard 'Em Say" with altered verses for the UnderCover event at Giant Dwarf Theatre in Sydney, Australia in February 2016. He began his performance with a comical impression of West and stage banter, before touching on contemporary divisions within Australian society, including prominent Islamophobia and the injustices of Australia Day. On April 12, 2016, London-based rapper Little Simz asked if she could share a track on Twitter and subsequently released a freestyle over the instrumental of "Heard 'Em Say" to SoundCloud. Little Simz raps for around three minutes and starts the freestyle by promising to "speak from the heart", prior to delivering introspective lyricism about subjects including fascist politicians and the importance of speaking the truth. G-Eazy interpolates lines from "Heard 'Em Say" on the interlude of his song "Charles Brown", which reuses the new line from his cover version. West received songwriting credit on the track, which was released on G-Eazy's fourth studio album The Beautiful & Damned in 2017. Fellow rapper Logic included a song named after "Heard 'Em Say" on his sixth studio album No Pressure, released in July 2020.

== Track listings ==
US 12" vinyl

A-side

1. "Heard 'Em Say" feat Adam Levine (Radio)
2. "Heard 'Em Say" feat Adam Levine (Main)
3. "Heard 'Em Say" feat Adam Levine (Instrumental)

B-side

1. "Touch the Sky" feat Lupe Fiasco (Radio)
2. "Touch the Sky" feat Lupe Fiasco (LP)
3. "Touch the Sky" feat Lupe Fiasco (Instrumental)

US CD single (Note: Open the first citation of these two to view the track listing.)

1. "Heard 'Em Say" (Album Version)
2. "Heard 'Em Say" (Ft John Legend) (Live from Abbey Road)
3. "Back to Basics" (International Bonus)

UK CD single

1. "Heard 'Em Say" – Album Version
2. "Heard 'Em Say" featuring John Legend – (Live from Abbey Road) – 4:13
3. "Back to Basics" – International Bonus
4. "Heard 'Em Say" – CD-Rom Video

== Credits and personnel ==
Information taken from Late Registration liner notes.

=== Recording locations ===
- Recorded at Sony Music Studios (NYC) and Grandmaster Recording Studios (Hollywood, CA)
- Mixed at Chalice Recording Studios (Hollywood, CA)

=== Personnel ===
- Kanye West – songwriter, producer
- Adam Levine – songwriter
- Michael Masser – songwriter
- Gerry Goffin – songwriter
- Jon Brion – producer
- Andrew Dawson – recorder
- Tom Biller – recorder
- Mike Dean – mix engineer
- Taylor Dow – assistant engineer
- Nate Connelly – assistant engineer
- Mike Mo – assistant engineer
- Tony "Penafire" Williams – additional vocals

== Charts ==
=== Weekly charts ===
Chart performance for "Heard 'Em Say"
Chart (2005–2006)	Peak position
Australia (ARIA)	27
Canada CHR/Pop Top 30 (Radio & Records)	22
Finland (Suomen virallinen lista)	10
Germany (GfK)	95
Ireland (IRMA)	23
Netherlands (Single Top 100)	67
New Zealand (Recorded Music NZ)	15
UK Singles (Official Charts)	22
UK Hip Hop/R&B (Official Charts)	4
US Billboard Hot 100	26
US Hot R&B/Hip-Hop Songs (Billboard)	17
US Pop Airplay (Billboard)	26
US Pop 100 (Billboard)	36

=== Year-end charts ===
2006 year-end chart performance for "Heard 'Em Say"
Chart (2006)	Position
Australia Urban (ARIA)	50
US Hot R&B/Hip-Hop Songs (Billboard)	91

== Certifications ==
Certifications for "Heard 'Em Say"
Region	Certification	Certified units/sales
New Zealand (RMNZ)	Gold	15,000^{‡}
United Kingdom (BPI)	Silver	200,000^{‡}
United States (RIAA)	Platinum	1,000,000^{‡}
^{‡} Sales+streaming figures based on certification alone.

== Release history ==
Release dates and formats for "Heard 'Em Say"
Region	Date	Format	Label(s)	Ref.
United States	October 24, 2005	12" vinyl	Roc-A-Fella; Def Jam	
United States	November 1, 2005	Mainstream radio	Roc-A-Fella; Def Jam	
United Kingdom	December 5, 2005	12" vinyl	Mercury	
Various	December 5, 2005	CD single	Mercury	
Various	December 12, 2005	CD single	Universal	
Various	March 1, 2006	Digital download	Roc-A-Fella	

== Notes and references ==
Notes

== Bibliography ==
- Beaumont, Mark (2015). Kanye West: God & Monster. London, England: Omnibus Press. ISBN 9781783233946.
- Brown, Jake (2006). Kanye West in the Studio: Beats Down! Money Up! (2000–2006). Colossus Books. ISBN 0-9767735-6-2.
- Kuo-Huang, Han (2009). Moore, Marvelene C.; Ewell, Philip (eds.). Kaleidoscope of Cultures: A Celebration of Multicultural Research and Practice. R&L Education. ISBN 9781607093039.
