= ParaNorman (soundtrack) =

ParaNorman (Original Motion Picture Soundtrack)

Film score by Jon Brion
- Released: August 14, 2012
- Recorded: 2011–2012
- Genre: Film score
- Length: 65:34
- Label: Relativity Music Group

Jon Brion chronology
The Future (2011)	ParaNorman (Original Motion Picture Soundtrack) (2012)	This is 40 (2012)

ParaNorman (Original Motion Picture Soundtrack) is the soundtrack to the 2012 stop-motion animated comedy horror film ParaNorman, directed by Sam Fell and Chris Butler for Laika. The film's original score was composed by Jon Brion and based on his compositions for previous films which were used as temp tracks. The score album was released through Relativity Music Group on August 14, 2012.

== Development ==
In June 2011, it was announced that Jon Brion would compose music for ParaNorman. Fell and Butler storyboarded the few pages of the script and used the themes from the soundtrack of Eternal Sunshine of the Spotless Mind (2004) which fit the film. He described as Brion as a "mad scientist", further adding "just like us, he's into old tech/new tech, and that's exactly what we're doing visually". Besides Eternal Sunshine, Brion used his themes from the previous films as temp tracks and curated the score based on them. For the score, he used a EMS VCS3 synthesizer, which was notably used by John Carpenter.

== Release ==
The soundtrack was announced on July 23, 2012, with the complete track list being unveiled. Relativity Music Group published the soundtrack on August 14, 2012. A vinyl edition of the album was published by Mondo and released on April 19, 2014, in conjunction with the Record Store Day.

== Critical reception ==
Chrysta Cherrie of AllMusic described it as "a Frankenstein's monster-like mish-mash of kid-friendly chills and silly camp, synthesized through Brion's high-concept eccentricity." John Hazelton of Screen International wrote "Jon Brion provides a suitably off-kilter score." Justin Chang of Variety "Jon Brion's playfully creepy score nails the pic’s tone." Dylan Chester of The Film Stage called it as "John Carpenter-esque". Tasha Robinson of The A.V. Club reviewed that the score "provides for more variety". Jeff Meyers of Metro Times called it as a "shrewd and spirited score, which subverts horror genre expectations".

== Track listing ==
ParaNorman (Original Motion Picture Soundtrack) track listing
No.	Title	Length
1.	"Zombie Attacks in the Eighties"	1:47
2.	"Norman at the Piano / Main Title"	1:07
3.	"Norman's Walk"	2:53
4.	"Alvin Attacks"	0:49
5.	"Enter Neil / Mr P / Ghost Walk / Ghost Dog"	4:22
6.	"Goodbye Mr P / Historic Drama / Grounded / Heavy Visitation"	5:29
7.	"Alvin Again / Scary Bedroom"	1:13
8.	"Norman Tries to Keep it Cool / Grandma's Got Your Back"	1:28
9.	"Moth Rock"	1:26
10.	"The Dead Shall Be Raised"	3:06
11.	"Zombies Attack"	7:59
12.	"People Attack"	15:55
13.	"Are We There Yet?"	0:24
14.	"Aggie Fights"	6:46
15.	"Resolution"	6:26
16.	"Oh, and One More Thing"	4:24
Total length:		65:34

== Personnel ==
Credits adapted from liner notes.

- Music composer, producer and conductor – Jon Brion
- Arrangements – Kevin Kaska
- Recording and mixing – Greg Koller
- Mastering – Stephen Marsh
- Music editor – Eric Caudieux
- Assistant engineer – Paul Pritchard
- Auricle programming – Andy Glen
- Contractor – Isobel Griffiths
- Assistant contractor – Jo Buckley, Lucy Whaley
- Supervising contractor – Kevin Kaska
- Studio management – Colette Barber
- Production manager – Charlene Ann Huang

== Release history ==
Release dates and formats for ParaNorman (Original Motion Picture Soundtrack)
Region	Date	Format(s)	Label	Ref.
Various	August 14, 2012	Digital download; streaming; CD	Back Lot Music	
Various	April 19, 2014	Vinyl	Mondo	

== Accolades ==
Accolades for ParaNorman (Original Motion Picture Soundtrack)
Awards	Category	Result	Ref.
International Film Music Critics Association	Best Original Score for an Animated Film	Nominated	
