= Punch Drunk Love =

Punch Drunk Love may refer to:

- Punch-Drunk Love, a 2002 film written and directed by Paul Thomas Anderson
  - Punch-Drunk Love (soundtrack), soundtrack album of the above film
- "Punch Drunk Love", song from the album Chapter 1. Dream Girl – The Misconceptions of You, by Shinee
