= Eternal Sunshine of the Spotless Mind (soundtrack) =

Soundtrack album for the 2004 film

Soundtrack album by Jon Brion
- Released: March 16, 2004
- Genre: Soundtrack
- Length: 56:08
- Label: Hollywood
- Producers: Kathy Nelson (executive producer); Tim DeLaughter (track 4); Jon Brion (track 9); Don Nelson (tracks 11 and 20); Ethan Johns (track 18)

Jon Brion chronology
Punch-Drunk Love (2002)	Eternal Sunshine of the Spotless Mind (2004)	I Heart Huckabees (2004)

The soundtrack album for Eternal Sunshine of the Spotless Mind was released by Hollywood Records on March 16, 2004. It features the score, composed by Los Angeles musician Jon Brion, as well as songs from artists Electric Light Orchestra (ELO), the Polyphonic Spree, the Willowz, and Don Nelson. Beck, in a collaboration with Jon Brion, provides a cover version of the Korgis' "Everybody's Got to Learn Sometime". Many of the vocal songs revolve around either memories or the sun.

== Details ==
Jon Brion provided much of the music for the film. Although only one track ("Strings That Tie to You") features his singing (similar to the soundtrack for Punch-Drunk Love), his next soundtrack (for I Heart Huckabees) would feature seven vocal songs.

The garage rock band The Willowz contributed two songs to the soundtrack, and would later contribute songs to director Michel Gondry's next film The Science of Sleep.

"Mr. Blue Sky" is not featured in the film, but plays in the theatrical trailer and most advertising spots for the film.

Brion's song "Showtime" on this soundtrack should not be confused with the song "Showtime" he wrote for the film Magnolia.

Three filmi songs from old Hindi movies can be heard playing in the background (when Clementine invites Joel to her apartment for a drink). These are "Mera Man Tera Pyasa" (My mind yearns for you) from the movie Gambler (1971) performed by Mohammed Rafi, "Tere Sang Pyar Main" from the movie Nagin (1976) performed by Lata Mangeshkar, and "Wada Na Tod" (Break not the promise) also by Lata Mangeshkar from the movie Dil Tujhko Diya (Gave my heart to you, 1987). All three songs are listed in the original soundtrack credits.

== Albums appearing in the movie ==
Several albums were mentioned in the shooting script and appeared in the final cut of the film. Among these are Brian Eno's Music for Airports (1978), the instrumental live version of the same by Bang on a Can (1998), Björk's Homogenic (1997) and Tom Waits's Rain Dogs (1985).

== Track listing ==
All tracks by Jon Brion, except where noted.

No.	Title	Artist	Length
1.	"Theme"		2:24
2.	"Mr. Blue Sky"	Electric Light Orchestra	5:03
3.	"Collecting Things"		1:13
4.	"Light & Day"	The Polyphonic Spree	3:03
5.	"Bookstore"		0:52
6.	"It's the Sun" (KCRW Morning Becomes Eclectic version)	The Polyphonic Spree	5:33
7.	"Wada Na Tod, Mera Man Tera Pyasa"	Lata Mangeshkar, Mohammed Rafi	5:54
8.	"Showtime"		0:55
9.	"Everybody's Got to Learn Sometime" (The Korgis cover)	Beck	5:54
10.	"Sidewalk Flight"		0:31
11.	"Some Kinda Shuffle"	Don Nelson	2:11
12.	"Howard Makes It All Go Away"		0:14
13.	"Something"	The Willowz	2:23
14.	"Postcard"		0:23
15.	"I Wonder"	The Willowz	2:56
16.	"Peer Pressure"		1:12
17.	"A Dream Upon Waking"		3:36
18.	"Strings That Tie to You"		2:33
19.	"Phone Call"		1:03
20.	"Nola's Bounce"	Don Nelson	1:56
21.	"Down The Drain"		0:56
22.	"Row"		1:00
23.	"Drive In"		2:19
24.	"Main Title"		1:23
25.	"Spotless Mind"		1:12
26.	"Elephant Parade"		0:28
Total length:			56:08

== Adaptation ==
Roc Nation artist Jay Electronica sampled five Jon Brion compositions from the soundtrack for his debut mixtape Act I: Eternal Sunshine (The Pledge). The tracks first appeared in 2007 on Jay Electronica's Myspace page.

== In popular culture ==
Don Nelson's song "Some Kinda Shuffle" was briefly featured in Luc Besson's 2017 space opera film Valerian and the City of a Thousand Planets.
