= I Heart Huckabees (soundtrack) =

Soundtrack album by Jon Brion
- Released: October 12, 2004
- Genre: Soundtrack
- Length: 43:29
- Label: Milan Records
- Producer: Jon Brion, Jonathan Karp

Jon Brion chronology
| Eternal Sunshine of the Spotless Mind (2004) | I Heart Huckabees (2004) |

Professional ratings
Review scores
| Source | Rating |
|---|---|
| AllMusic | link |

I Heart Huckabees is the 2004 soundtrack album by Jon Brion for the film of the same name.

== Track listing ==
1. "Monday" – 2:08
2. "Knock Yourself Out" – 2:10
3. "Strange Bath" – 0:57
4. "Cubes" – 1:42
5. "Didn't Think It Would Turn Out Bad" – 2:41
6. "Coincidences" – 1:19
7. "Over Our Heads" – 2:29
8. "You Learn" – 2:20
9. "Later Monday" – 2:08
10. "Ska" – 1:18
11. "Wouldn't Have It Any Other Way" – 1:24
12. "Huckabees Jingle (50's Version)" – 0:20
13. "Revolving Door" – 4:33
14. "JB's Blues" – 2:17
15. "True To Yourself" – 2:47
16. "Didn't Think It Would Turn Out Bad (String Quartet Version)" – 1:49
17. "Strangest Times" – 1:56
18. "Omni" – 1:38
19. "Get What It's About" – 5:59
20. "Monday (End Credits)" – 1:44
