= How Pop Can You Get? =

Studio album by The Bats
- Released: 1982
- Genre: Power pop
- Length: 45:43
- Label: Gustav Records

Alternative cover
- 2008 release cover

How Pop Can You Get? was the only album by musical group The Bats, consisting of Jon Brion, Bill Murphy and Don "Riff" Fertman. It was recorded in New Haven and West Haven, Connecticut and released on the Gustav label (Gustav UA1001) in the fall of 1982.

== Background ==
The Bats was formed in the early 1980s by Jon Brion, Bill Murphy and Don Fertman. They would write and record the entirety of what would be their first album in a small studio in Connecticut.

Before the release of the album, the band released a single titled "Popgun," in 1982. Just like the album, the single was released under the Gustav record label. The single would be rereleased as part of the digital remaster of How Pop Can You Get? in 2008, and would be reissued as a vinyl in 2012.

== Critical reception ==
The album received critical acclaim, being called "The Pop(ulist) album of the Year" by Op Magazine. Billboard called it a "Recommended LP" in their October 2, 1982 issue. They explained that:

"From the cover, this looks like wacky new wave pop a la B-52’s. What’s on the vinyl though is well-crafted, if youthful power pop. This group is only a trio, and from their looks quite young but manages to project a full, powerful sound. Though on a small label the sound is crisp and professional.
To those who wake up every morning to well worn copies of the Rasperries’ “Go All the Way,” this ones for you."

Despite critical acclaim, the album failed to chart. The band would break up shortly thereafter.

== Legacy ==
In 2006, The Bats song "Not My Girl Anymore" appeared in the soundtrack of the movie Nail Polish. "Every Night" was used an episode in season 6 of "Young Sheldon"

A digitally remastered version of the album, which includes the previously released single "Popgun", was released in 2008 on most major online music retailers.

== Track listing ==
All tracks are written by Jon Brion, Bill Murphy, and Don Fertman.

Standard edition
No.	Title	Length
1.	"Chauve-Souris"	:45
2.	"How Pop Can You Get?"	2:42
3.	"Not Easy For Me"	3:33
4.	"Will She ever Come Around?"	3:15
5.	"Mr. Peculiar"	2:45
6.	"Living In Alaska"	3:05
7.	"Not My Girl Anymore"	3:15
8.	"Something Ventured"	3:26
9.	"Hey Teen-Age"	5:25
10.	"Why Does Suzy Have Bad Dreams?"	3:07
11.	"Paranoid Schizophrenic"	3:01
12.	"Every Night"	3:58
13.	"Too Out Bottom of the Ninth"	7:26
Total length:		45:43

2008 Digital Remaster
No.	Title	Length
14.	"Popgun"	3:26
Total length:		49:09
