= Magnolia (score) =

Magnolia: Original Motion Picture Score

Film score by Jon Brion
- Released: March 14, 2000
- Genre: Soundtrack
- Length: 48:37
- Label: Warner Bros.

Jon Brion chronology
Magnolia: Original Motion Picture Score (2000)	Meaningless (2001)

Magnolia is the score soundtrack to the film of the same name. It is composed by Jon Brion. A soundtrack release for the film with original music by Aimee Mann was previously issued in 1999. A ninth track is also based on the film.

== Track listing ==
1. "A Little Library Music/Going to a Show" – 5:35
2. "Showtime" – 10:28
3. "Jimmy's Breakdown" – 4:24
4. "WDKK Theme" – 0:45
5. "I've Got a Surprise for You Today" – 6:12
6. "Stanley/Frank/Linda's Breakdown" – 11:00
7. "Chance of Rain" – 4:10
8. "So Now Then" – 3:51
9. "Magnolia" – 2:12
