= Self Help Serenade =

Studio album by Marjorie Fair
- Released: May 31, 2004
- Recorded: 2002
- Genre: Indie rock
- Length: 48:52
- Label: EMI / Capitol
- Producer: Rob Schnapf, Jerry Finn

Marjorie Fair chronology
Self Help Serenade (2004)	I Am My Own Rainbow (2016)

Singles from Self Help Serenade
- 1. "Stare" Released: May 17, 2004; 2. "Waves" Released: October 18, 2004; 3. "Empty Room" Released: June 2005

Professional ratings
Aggregate scores
Source	Rating
Metacritic	68/100
Review scores
Source	Rating
AllMusic	3/5 stars
Drowned in Sound	6/10
Lost at Sea	7.5/10
Pitchfork	6.9/10
Uncut	4/5 stars

Self Help Serenade is the debut album by American indie rock band Marjorie Fair, first released in the United Kingdom and Europe on May 31, 2004, and in the United States on July 19, 2005. The album was produced and mixed by Rob Schnapf, "Empty Room" was mixed by Tom Lord-Alge, and the album features guest contributions from Jon Brion and Joey Waronker. "Empty Room" was not included on the UK pressings of the album.

"Empty Room" was featured in the One Tree Hill episode "An Attempt to Tip the Scales" (3.4).

The band were dropped from Capitol Records after the album's release, and the band did not release another album until 2016's I Am My Own Rainbow.

== Track listing ==
All tracks written by Evan Slamka.

1. "Don't Believe" – 4:18
2. "Halfway House" – 5:13
3. "Empty Room" – 3:43
4. "Stare" – 4:20
5. "How Can You Laugh" – 5:07
6. "Waves" – 4:13
7. "Please Don't" – 4:04
8. "Cracks in the Wall" – 4:06
9. "Stand in the World" – 5:01
10. "Hold on to You" – 2:39
11. "Silver Gun" – 5:14
12. "My Sun Is Setting Over Her Magic" – 6:28

== Singles ==
"Stare" (May 17, 2004)

1. "Stare" – 4:20
2. "How Can You Laugh" – 5:07
3. "Science of Your Mind" – 4:35
4. "Timmy" – 4:36

"Waves" (October 18, 2004)

1. "Waves" – 4:13
2. "What I Said" – 1:51
3. "True Lovers" – 4:36
