= Marjorie Fair =

American indie rock band

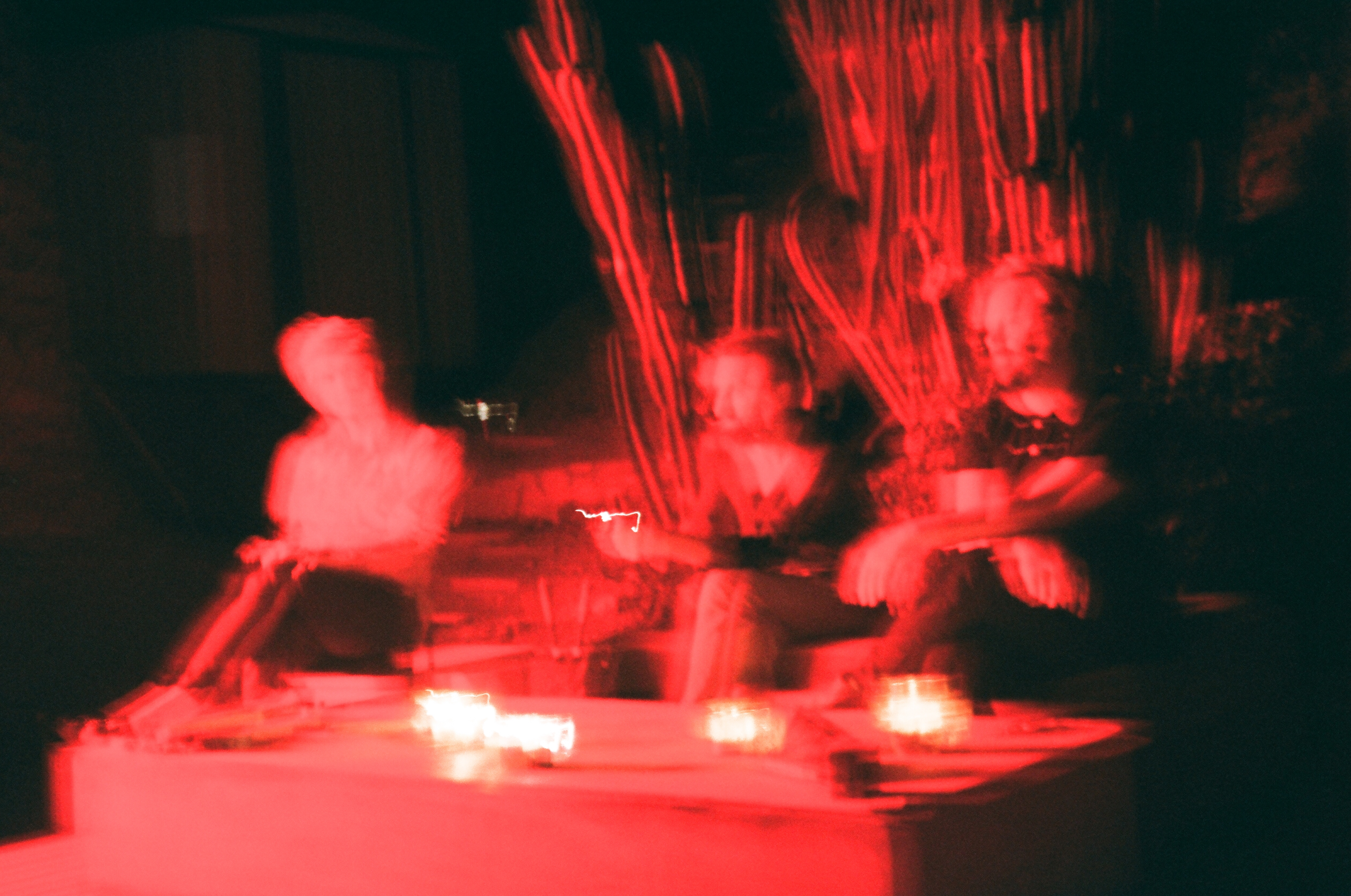
Marjorie Fair 2021

Marjorie Fair is an indie rock/psychedelic American band formed in New Jersey by musician Evan Slamka, and based in Los Angeles, California. The band is best known for their debut album Self Help Serenade, released in 2004 on Capitol Records. Marjorie Fair's melodic psychedelia has been compared to Mercury Rev, Pernice Brothers, The Beach Boys, Grandaddy, Elliott Smith and the solo works of Jon Brion, who contributed parts to Self Help Serenade.

Following the release of Self Help Serenade in the UK on May 31, 2004, Marjorie Fair toured Europe and opened for acts including Modest Mouse and Doves. Marjorie Fair played a series of West Coast residencies in the fall, while awaiting Capitol to release their album stateside. The album did not end up being released in the United States until July 19, 2005 and was supported by a U.S. tours. The group promoted the album with a performance at the Glastonbury Festival, iTunes Sessions and further touring with Tegan and Sara and Mellowdrone that fall.

In summer 2006, Marjorie Fair was recruited to open for John Mayer and Sheryl Crow on a massive stadium tour.

June 2009, the band released the e.p Spectrum of Love. Produced by Joey Waronker and mixed by Darrell Thorp.

In a series of posts in early 2015, Slamka teased cover art for a new Marjorie Fair album to be titled I Am My Own Rainbow.

I Am My Own Rainbow was released March 25, 2016 on Psychic Bully. The album was preceded by the first single "Songbird". Followed by a video for the song "Save Time". Produced again by Joey Waronker and the band. The band played shows on the west coast and around Los Angeles while writing and recording the follow-up.

A new record titled "Distant Talker" was scheduled for 2021 release but has yet to appear.

== Current members ==
- Evan Slamka - Vocals, Guitar, Keyboards
- Nicholas Johns - Bass, Keyboards, Guitar, Vocals
- Dylan Ryan - Drums, Percussion

== Past members ==
- Wayne Faler - Guitar
- Dain Luscombe - Keyboards
- Chris Tristram - Bass guitar
- Scott Lord - Bass guitar
- Mike Delisa - Drums
- Jayson Larson – Drums
- Josh Brown - Keyboards

== Discography ==
Albums

- Self Help Serenade (May 31, 2004 - UK) (July 19, 2005 - US) (iTunes digital release included bonus track "Waves (Live On Indie 103.1)")
- I Am My Own Rainbow (March 25, 2016)

EPs

- Sessions (iTunes digital release only) (October 25, 2005)
- Spectrum of Love (June 20, 2009)

Singles

- "Stare" b/w "How Can You Laugh," "Science Of Your Mind," and "Timmy" (May 17, 2004 - UK)
- "Waves" b/w "What I Said" and "True Lovers" (October 18, 2004 - UK)
- "Black Holes" (June 13, 2009)
- "Songbird" (March 3, 2015)
- "Save Time" (June 21, 2015)
