= Meaningless (album) =

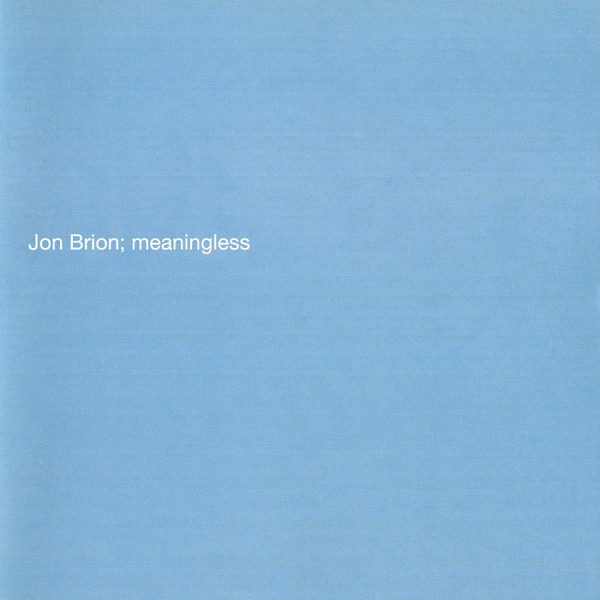

Studio album by Jon Brion
- Released: 2001
- Recorded: 2000
- Genre: Power pop
- Length: 44:29
- Label: Straight to Cut-Out (Independent), Jealous Butcher Records (2022 reissue)
- Producer: Jon Brion; Ethan Johns ("Trouble")

Jon Brion chronology
Magnolia (2000)	Meaningless (2001)	Punch-Drunk Love (2002)

Meaningless is the debut solo studio album by American singer-songwriter Jon Brion, released in 2001. Initially slated for release on Lava Records, the album was ultimately released independently by Brion on his own "Straight to Cut-Out" label, sold through his website and CD Baby. After being widely unavailable and obscure due to its limited release, in 2022 the album received its first wide release and first pressing on vinyl through Jealous Butcher Records.

== Critical reception ==
Professional ratings
Review scores
Source	Rating
AllMusic	4.5/5 stars
Tiny Mix Tapes	5/5 stars

Jason Damas of AllMusic observed the influence of Brion's past collaborators, particularly Aimee Mann, in the album's music, while noting that "in reality it is a representation of the purest form of what Brion has given to the production of those other artists' work". He deemed Meaningless to be "a lovely, catchy, and personal pop album on par with (and in many cases, superior to) the albums and artists that he has worked with in the past".

In a 2016 reappraisal of the album, PopMatters critic Dylan J. Montanari wrote that Meaningless "remains the defining document to which Brion aficionados turn to be reminded of the place he has so admirably carved out for himself in the pop landscape".

== Track listing ==
All tracks are written by Jon Brion, except where noted.

Meaningless track listing
No.	Title	Writer(s)	Length
1.	"Gotta Start Somewhere"		4:13
2.	"I Believe She's Lying"	Brion, Aimee Mann	3:26
3.	"Meaningless"		3:23
4.	"Ruin My Day"	Brion, Jeff McGregor	3:49
5.	"Walking Through Walls"	Brion, Grant Lee Phillips	5:49
6.	"Trouble"	Brion, McGregor	3:29
7.	"Hook, Line, and Sinker"		4:25
8.	"Dead to the World"		2:21
9.	"Her Ghost"		4:12
10.	"Same Mistakes"		1:59
11.	"Voices" (Cheap Trick cover)	Rick Nielsen	7:32

== Personnel ==
Jon Brion performs vocals and instruments on all tracks except "Trouble", which features:

- Jim Keltner – drums
- Benmont Tench – piano
- Greg Leisz – pedal steel guitar
- Mary Lynn Rajskub – backing vocals
- Ethan Johns – production

Additional personnel

- Jon Brion – mixing
- Curt Anderson – engineering
- Tom Biller – engineering
- Doug Collins – mixing, engineering
- Rich Costey – engineering
- Mike Deneen – engineering
- Creston Funk – photography
- Ethan Johns – engineering
- Benjamin Niles – design
- Jack Joseph Puig – engineering
- Eddy Schreyer – mastering at Oasis Mastering, Studio City, California, United States
- John Tyrell – engineering
