= Cherry Twister =

American power pop band

- Origin: Pennsylvania
- Genres: Power pop; indie rock; alternative rock
- Years active: 1993 –
- Label: Lucky
- Past members: Steve Ward; Ross Sackler; Michael Giblin

Cherry Twister was an American power pop band consisting of musicians Steve Ward, Ross Sackler and Michael Giblin. The band formed in early 1993; Ward and Sackler had previously been in Harrisburg-based band 23 Skidoo, with Dave Sheaffer and Joe Pisapia. Pisapia went on to form Nashville-based Joe, Marc's Brother. Ward and Sackler made some lo-fi recordings that were released on Planet Earthy in 1993; guitarist Michael Giblin appeared on the second album At Home With Cherry Twister, released in 2000.

Steve Ward moved to a solo career, recording several CDs. Mike Giblin moved on to Parallax Project and released three CDs titled Oblivious, Perpetual Limbo and I Hate Girls. He then went on to form The Split Squad, with Clem Burke of Blondie, Josh Kantor of The Baseball Project, Eddie Munoz of The Plimsouls and Keith Steng of The Fleshtones. Ross Sackler joined up with Dave Aufiero and John Fritchey from The Polins and Mike Pasariello from Wayne Supergenius to form Peabody and released a self-titled CD.

In 2011, Cherry Twister reunited on stage for the first time in 13 years to perform to a sold-out crowd at the 2nd Annual Susan Giblin Foundation For Animal Wellness and Welfare Benefit.

== Discography ==
- Cherry Twister (1993)
- At Home With Cherry Twister (2000)

=== At Home With Cherry Twister ===
At Home With Cherry Twister

Studio album by Cherry Twister
- Released: March 28, 2000
- Recorded: 1999
- Genre: Power pop
- Length: 57:36
- Label: Not Lame Recordings
- Producer: Cherry Twister

Cherry Twister chronology
Cherry Twister (1993)	At Home With Cherry Twister (2000)

At Home With Cherry Twister is the second and last studio album from Cherry Twister. The album was particularly well received by British music journalists. In Shake Some Action: The Ultimate Power Pop Guide, John M. Borack writes "there's nary a false move to be found in At Home With Cherry Twister". The New Zealand Herald said the album "boasts all the virtues of great power-pop".

In a negative review, Jason Damas of AllMusic said of the album embodies "the D.I.Y. ethic of Ram-era McCartney while sounding like they spend lots of time listening to Beach Boys and Big Star records," but that it fails to "stumble across anything resembling a truly memorable hook."

==== Tracklist ====
All tracks are written by Steve Ward, unless noted otherwise.

At Home With Cherry Twister track listing
No.	Title	Writer(s)	Length
1.	"Don't Forget Your Man"	Michael Giblin; Ross Sackler; Steve Ward	4:13
2.	"Sparkle"	Giblin; Sackler; Ward	2:22
3.	"Meteorite"	Doug Baker; Giblin; Sackler; Ward	3:48
4.	"Charolette B."		3:34
5.	"I'm Gonna Be The Lonely Boy Tonite"		2:27
6.	"American Nightlife"	Wallace Bulletproof	0:51
7.	"Leila"		5:43
8.	"She's Gone"	Giblin; Ward	3:20
9.	"Maryann"	Giblin; Sackler; Ward	3:14
10.	"Black Summer"	Giblin; Sackler; Ward	4:04
11.	"Brighten Up"		3:25
12.	"Kinda Like a Star"	Baker; Giblin; Sackler; Ward	4:39
13.	"She's In Love Again"	Giblin	3:39
14.	"'Til I'm Blue"		3:43
15.	"Careful (Can't Fall Again)"		3:40
16.	"Why Won't You Believe In Me?"		4:46
Total length:			57:36

==== Personnel ====
Cherry Twister

- Michael Giblin - bass, theremin, percussion, vocals
- Ross Sackler - drums, percussion, vocals
- Steve Ward - guitar, keyboards, theremin, percussion, vocals

Additional musicians

- Trixi Greiner - keyboards on "Meteorite", "Charolette B.", and "Careful (Can't Fall Again)", accordion on "She's Gone"
- Jason Hoffheins - percussion on "Charolette B."
- Wallace Bulletproof - chanter on "American Nightlife"
- James Haggerty - backing vocals on "'Til I'm Blue"
- Joe Pisapia - backing vocals and guitar on "'Til I'm Blue"
- Marc Pisapia - backing vocals on "'Til I'm Blue"
- Rob Zwally - pedal steel guitar on "Careful (Can't Fall Again)" and "Why Won't You Believe In Me?"

Production

- Cherry Twister - producing, mixing, engineering

=== Other appearances ===
- Come and Get It: A Tribute to Badfinger
- Yellow Pills, Vol. 3
- Bucketfull of Brains 50th Anniversary CD
- Coming up! Independent artists pay tribute to the music of Paul McCartney
