= Jon Brion =

American musician (born 1963)

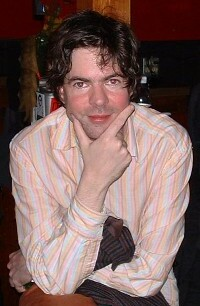
- Brion in 2004

Background information
- Born: December 11, 1963 (age 62); Glen Ridge, New Jersey, U.S.
- Genres: Film score; ambient; electronic; rock; jazz; hip hop
- Occupations: Composer; singer; songwriter; multi-instrumentalist; record producer
- Instruments: Vocals; keyboards; synthesizer; guitar; bass; percussion; trombone; cello; harmonica
- Years active: 1982–present

Jon Brion (born December 11, 1963) is an American singer, songwriter, multi-instrumentalist, record producer, and composer. He performed with the Excerpts, the Bats, 'Til Tuesday, and the Grays before becoming an established producer and film score composer.

Brion has produced music for artists and bands including Of Montreal, Aimee Mann, Love Jones, Eels, Fiona Apple, Robyn Hitchcock, Rhett Miller, The Crystal Method, Frank Ocean, Kanye West, Sky Ferreira and Mac Miller.

Brion's film scores include Hard Eight (1996), Magnolia (1999), Punch-Drunk Love (2002), Eternal Sunshine of the Spotless Mind, and I Heart Huckabees (both 2004), Synecdoche, New York (2008), ParaNorman (2012), Lady Bird (2017), and Christopher Robin (2018). He released his debut solo album, Meaningless, in 2001.

== Early life ==
Brion was born in Glen Ridge, New Jersey, on December 11, 1963. He comes from a musical family; his mother, LaRue, was a singer and administrative assistant, and his father, Keith Brion, was a band director at Yale. His brother and sister became a composer/arranger and a violinist, respectively. Brion grew up in Connecticut, where he dropped out of Hamden High School at the age of 17, opting instead to play music professionally. From 1980 to 1985 Jon was part of the band The Excerpts, along with Stephen Harris, Dean Falcone, Jim Balga, Bobby Butcher & Spike Priggen.

== Career ==
=== The Bats ===
In the early 1980s, Brion and musician/producer Bill Murphy began a writing collaboration in New Haven, Connecticut. They eventually enlisted bassist Don "Riff" Fertman and together formed the Bats (not to be confused with the New Zealand group or South African group of the same name). The Bats released a single, "Popgun", and one album, How Pop Can You Get?, on Gustav Records in 1982. The recordings had much critical acclaim, but little commercial success, and the trio eventually disbanded.

=== Session work ===
In 1987, Brion moved to Boston, where he played solo gigs, formed the short-lived band World's Fair and became a member of the last touring version of Aimee Mann's new wave band 'Til Tuesday. He contributed guitar work to Jellyfish's 1993 album Spilt Milk, and in 1994, joined Dan McCarroll, Buddy Judge and ex-Jellyfish guitarist Jason Falkner in the short-lived pop band the Grays. He also played guitar on the Wallflowers' hit song "One Headlight", using a screwdriver that was sitting atop a nearby amp as a slide. Brion played numerous instruments on Sam Phillips' 1996 release Omnipop. Brion is featured as keyboardist and drummer on Marianne Faithfull's 2003 album, Kissin Time, and co-wrote a song, "City of Quartz", for her next work, 2005's Before the Poison. In 2009, Brion contributed mutli-instrumentation to the Nonesuch debut, Christina Courtin.

=== Production ===
After being recognized as an accomplished session player, Brion branched out into production on then-girlfriend Mann's 1993 solo debut, Whatever, and its follow-up, I'm With Stupid. He has also produced albums by Fiona Apple, Rufus Wainwright, Eleni Mandell, Rhett Miller, Robyn Hitchcock, Brad Mehldau and Evan Dando, and co-produced Kanye West's Late Registration in 2005.

In the fall of 2002, Brion began producing the album Extraordinary Machine with Fiona Apple, but she later brought in producers Mike Elizondo and Brian Kehew (a friend of Brion's) to complete the album. Brion's versions leaked onto the Internet, where the album gained a cult following long before its official release.

Brion worked and performed on some of the tracks for Sean Lennon's 2006 album Friendly Fire. Lennon said that working with him was "how I would imagine it's like to work with Prince. It's like having a weird alien prodigy in your room."

Brion has produced recordings by British pop performer Dido, Spoon, and Keane, as well as 2010's False Priest by Of Montreal. Brion also produced Best Coast's second album which was released in early 2012. Brion worked on rapper Mac Miller's album Swimming (2018), and completed production on Miller's posthumous album Circles (2020).

According to Stereogum, Brion's work on Aimee Mann's first solo albums "lay the groundwork for a sound that became synonymous with a strain of notable alternative acts at the turn of the century".

=== Solo work ===
Brion was signed to the Lava/Atlantic label in 1997, but was released from his contract after turning in his solo debut album Meaningless; the album was released independently in 2001. In 2022, the album was remastered and re-released through Jealous Butcher Records, with Brion's approval.

Although, rumors persist about Brion working on a second solo full-length album, as of 2023, an album has not been forthcoming. In 2004, Aimee Mann stated "Jon has at least 10 albums' worth of material," and "I think he has a hard time saying anything is finished whether he's producing or doing his own songs. Jon's a perfectionist."

In 2023, power pop musician Mo Troper released Troper Sings Brion, an cover album of Brion songs that were never officially recorded or released.

=== Film scores ===
Brion is an accomplished film composer, having started scoring by frequently working with director Paul Thomas Anderson, with whom he collaborated on the director’s first three movies. In addition to scoring many of his films, Brion contributed music to Boogie Nights and had a cameo in the film as a moustached guitar player.

Particularly in his film soundtracks, Brion is noted for his use of early analog sampling instruments, particularly the Chamberlin and Optigan, to create near-realistic emulations of certain instruments.

He has earned Best Score Soundtrack Album Grammy nominations for his work on 1999's Magnolia and 2004's Eternal Sunshine of the Spotless Mind.

Brion was hired at the last minute to write the incidental music for The Break-Up. He has also scored and provided original music for I Heart Huckabees, Punch-Drunk Love, Step Brothers (with Chris Thile), ParaNorman, The Future, Synecdoche, New York, Greta Gerwig's Lady Bird and Disney's Christopher Robin (with Geoff Zanelli). He also did live composition for a musical commentary on the Step Brothers DVD.

He also composed the score to the Disney/Pixar short film, The Blue Umbrella, working alongside Sarah Jaffe.

Two previously unreleased tracks of Brion's were used in the score of Paul Thomas Anderson's 2025 film One Battle After Another.

== Touring and live performances ==
Brion is renowned for his regular Friday-night gigs at the Los Angeles club Largo, which feature covers and original songs, a variety of instruments and occasional guest musicians and comedians. He works without a set list, instead using audience suggestions as a jumping-off point. He uses a "jigsaw puzzle" approach to performing songs, and uses looping systems to record himself starting often with drums, then adding piano, bass, guitar, and vocals. Over the years, shows have featured spontaneous appearances with Jackson Browne, Gillian Welch, Fiona Apple, Rickie Lee Jones with upright bassist Stephen Patt (ex-The Chambers Brothers), Aimee Mann, Elliott Smith, Ben Folds, Nels Cline, percussionist Matt Chamberlain, Tori Amos, bassist Sebastian Steinberg (ex-Soul Coughing), and fiddler Sara Watkins (Nickel Creek).

On March 24th, 2004, Brion performed an experimental live show with John Frusciante (Red Hot Chili Peppers) and friends at The Knitting Factory in Los Angeles, playing a variety of keys and percussion. The show was labelled "Performance #9" and featured fellow artists Josh Klinghoffer and Carla Azar on drums as well as Flea and Eric Avery on bass. John Frusciante played electric guitar, his Doepfer A-100 modular synthesiser and provided vocals.

In April 2006, recurring tendonitis in Brion's right hand forced him to cancel all of his upcoming Largo shows. As a temporary 'farewell', he played one show only using his left hand, even looping his songs as he normally does and playing the drums with one stick. He resumed playing at Largo on a regular weekly basis later that year, transitioning to a monthly show in 2016, until the COVID-19 Pandemic. In summer 2023, Brion stated to Largo at the Coronet that he intended to resume shows in the near future. Brion resumed shows at Largo in September 2023.

Recalling his approach to the Largo shows with Chicago Tribune music editor Lou Carlozo, Brion said: "I taught my hands to follow whatever was coming into my head—and wherever my consciousness would go, I had to push my hands to follow. And at some level, you just had to abandon any concern about how you'd look. Performing without a set list: That was special."

In March 2016, Brion performed his score for Punch-Drunk Love with Wordless Music Orchestra in both Los Angeles and New York City, at the Ace Hotel and the Brooklyn Academy of Music, respectively. Norah Jones provided guest vocals in New York and Joanna Newsom in Los Angeles.

In February 2018, Brion opened for John Mulaney as part of Mulaney's special, Kid Gorgeous. Brion performed during Mulaney's New York City leg of his tour, playing classic rock songs on Radio City's Mighty Wurlitzer theatre organ.

== Personal life ==
Brion lives and works in Los Angeles.

Brion had relationships with Aimee Mann during the late 1980s-early 1990s and with Mary Lynn Rajskub from 1997 to 2002.

== Discography ==
=== Solo ===
- Meaningless (2001)

=== The Bats ===
- The Bats – How Pop Can You Get? (1982)

=== The Grays ===
- The Grays – Ro Sham Bo (1994)

=== Film scores ===
- Hard Eight (with Michael Penn) (1996)
- Magnolia (1999)
- Punch-Drunk Love (2002)
- Eternal Sunshine of the Spotless Mind (2004)
- I Heart Huckabees (2004)
- The Break-Up (2006)
- Synecdoche, New York (2008)
- Step Brothers (2008)
- Glago's Guest (2008)
- The Other Guys (2010)
- Stone (2010) (Main Theme Composer)
- The Future (2011)
- ParaNorman (2012)
- This Is 40 (2012)
- The Blue Umbrella (2013)
- Delivery Man (2013)
- The Gambler (2014)
- Trainwreck (2015)
- John Mulaney: The Comeback Kid (2015)
- Curmudgeons (2016)
- Wilson (2017)
- Lady Bird (2017)
- Sink or Swim (2018)
- Christopher Robin (2018) (with Geoff Zanelli)
- Fool's Paradise (2023)
- Beating Hearts (2024)
- Pee-wee as Himself (2025)
- One Battle After Another (2025)
- Outcome (2026)

=== Production and guest appearances ===
Year	Album	Artist	Details	Ref.
1989	Rei Momo	David Byrne	Harmonium on "I Know Sometimes a Man Is Wrong"	
1991	Kryptonita	Miguel Mateos	Mellotron, Harmonium, Hammond b3, Piano	
1993	Broken Toy Shop	E	Background vocals on "Shine It All On"	
1993	Whatever	Aimee Mann	Co-producer, co-writer (three tracks), bass, guitar, drums, keyboards, synthesizers, piano, background vocals, and others	
1993	Tuesdays Are Forever	D.D. Wood	Harmonium	
1993	Spilt Milk	Jellyfish	Guitar on eight tracks	
1993	In Thrall	Murray Attaway	Bass, guitar, mellotron, piano, vibraphone	
1993	Here's to the Losers	Love Jones	Keyboards, synthesizers, electric organ, vibraphone	
1994	Love Spit Love	Love Spit Love	Keyboards, piano, string arrangements	
1995	Powerful Pain Relief	Love Jones	Keyboards, synthesizers, piano, organ	
1995	I Don't Know Why I Act This Way	Jude Cole	Guitar, keyboards, harmonium, calliope	
1995	For the Love of Harry: Everybody Sings Nilsson	Various artists	Producing, instrumentation for "One" by Aimee Mann	
1995	I'm with Stupid	Aimee Mann	Producer, co-writer (five tracks), bass, guitars, drums and percussion, keyboards, cello, harmonica, background vocals	
1995	Sing Hollies in Reverse	Various	Performed cover of "Sorry Suzanne".	
1996	Come and Get It: A Tribute to Badfinger	Cherry Twister	Producer, instrumentation, background vocals	
1996	Tidal	Fiona Apple	Guitar, keyboards, vibraphone, tack piano, marimba	
1996	Bringing Down the Horse	Wallflowers	Guitar solo "One Headlight"	
1996	Braver Newer World	Jimmie Dale Gilmore	Guitar, bass, optigan	
1996	This Can't Be Life	Wild Colonials	Guitar, Chamberlin, organ	
1996	Sweet Relief II: Gravity of the Situation	Various artists	Optigan, vibraphone on "Guilty by Association" by Joe Henry & Madonna	
1996	Susanna Hoffs	Susanna Hoffs	Guitar, bass, keyboards, percussion, drums	
1996	Prettier Than You	Brian Stevens	Guitar, clavinet	
1996	Phantom Blues	Taj Mahal	Guitar, Chamberlin	
1996	Omnipop (It's Only a Flesh Wound Lambchop)	Sam Phillips	Guitar, bass, Chamberlin, drums, piano	
1996	Beautiful Freak	Eels	Co-producer, guitar, keyboards, trombone, engineering, co-writer of "Not Ready Yet"	
1996	Just Say Noël	Various artists	Co-producer on "Christmastime" by Aimee Man with Michael Penn	
1997	Shaken and Stirred: The David Arnold James Bond Project	David Arnold and various artists	Guitar, sitar, harmonium on "Nobody Does It Better" by Aimee Mann	
1997	The Mommyheads	Mommyheads	Keyboards	
1997	Megiddo	Lauren Hoffman	Keyboards, organs, vibraphone	
1997	Little Head	John Hiatt	Keyboards, vibraphone	
1997	Lincoln	Lincoln	Guitar, keyboards	
1997	Farewell	Uma	Guitar, keyboards	
1997	Eighteen Over Me	Garrison Starr	Organ, vibraphone	
1997	10 Cent Wing	Jonatha Brooke	Guitar	
1997	Daisy (Dog's Eye View album)	Dog's Eye View	Listed under "With a Little Help from my Friends" in liner notes.	
1998	XO	Elliott Smith	Vibraphone and keyboards on two tracks	
1998	Two Kinds of Laughter	Sara Hickman	Co-composer of "Coolness by Mistake"	
1998	Songs From The Pipe	The Surfers	Guitar, keyboards, background vocals	
1998	Sliding Doors soundtrack	Various artists	Producer, co-writer of "Amateur" by Aimee Man	
1998	Pleasantville: Music from the Motion Picture	Various artists	Producing, instrumentation, mixing on "Across the Universe" and "Please Send Me Someone to Love by Fiona Apple	
1998	Kool Trash	The Plimsouls	Piano, organ	
1998	Jubilee	Grant Lee Buffalo	Piano, Chamberlin, vibraphone, harmonium, optigan, tack piano	
1998	Got No Shadow	Mary Lou Lord	Harmonium, Chamberlin	
1998	Electro-Shock Blues	Eels	Chamberlin and organ on "Climbing to the Moon"	
1998	Burning the Daze	Marc Cohn	Harmonium, harmonica	
1998	Wishbone	Eleni Mandell	Co-producer, guitar, keyboards, Mellotron, bass, backing vocals, organ, banjo, drums, slide guitar, vibraphone, celesta, talk box	
1998	Welcome to Woop Woop	Various Artists	Producer for eels track "Dog's Life".	
1998	Lilith Fair (A Celebration Of Women In Music)	Various Artists	Listed as writer on Wild Colonials song "Charm".	
1998	North American Long Weekend	Tom Freund	Electric guitar on "Cry Baby Cry"	
1999	Rufus Wainwright	Rufus Wainwright	Producer, additional engineering, vibraphone, marimba, keyboards, accordion, bass, guitar, organ, backing vocals, percussion, celesta, mandolin	
1999	Word of Mouth Parade	Gus	Guitar, mandolin, keyboards	
1999	When the Pawn...	Fiona Apple	Producer, guitars, bass, keyboards, vibraphone, drums, percussion, mixing	
1999	On How Life Is	Macy Gray	Guitar, electric keyboards and synthesizers, piano, vibraphone	
1999	Jewels for Sophia	Robyn Hitchcock	Co-producer, bass, drums and percussion, keyboards, organ, background vocals, engineer	
1999	Imaginate	Taxiride	Chamberlin	
1999	Fight Songs	Old 97's	Organ on "Murder (Or a Heart Attack)"	
1999	Magnolia: Music from the Motion Picture	Aimee Mann	Co-producer, co-writer of "Build That Wall", composer of "Magnolia", guitar, keyboards, organ, percussion, glockenspiel, background vocals	
1999	Breakdown	Melissa Etheridge	Guitar	
1999	After the Party	The Push Stars	Guitar	
1999	Figure 8	Julia Darling	Electric guitar on "Bulletproof Belief"	
1999	Bachelor No. 2 or, the Last Remains of the Dodo	Aimee Mann	Co-producer, guitar, drums and percussion, keyboards, background vocals	
1999	Put Another Date on Life	Solin	Drums on "When the Mood Swings"	
2000	Two Lips: The Lost Album	Dan Castellaneta	Guitars, saxophone	
2000	Magnolia score	Himself	Composer	
2000	Tonight and the Rest of My Life	Nina Gordon	Bass, guitars, keyboards, organ	
2000	Teddy Thompson	Teddy Thompson	Guitar on two tracks	
2000	From There to Here	John Oszajca	Guitar	
2000	Figure 8	Elliott Smith	Background vocals on "Happiness"/"The Gondola Man"	
2000	Breach	The Wallflowers	Additional musician	
2000	A Star for Bram	Robyn Hitchcock	Producer, bass, guitars, drums, keyboards, piano, background vocals	
2000	Oh What a Beautiful Morning	Eels	Writer of "Not Ready Yet"	
2001	Trust No One	Dave Navarro	Intro voice and slide bass, "Mourning Son", guitars on "Very Little Daylight"	
2001	Tweekend	The Crystal Method	Bass, guitars, drums, keyboards, engineering, mixing on "Over the Line"	
2001	The Herethereafter	Miranda Lee Richards	Producer, bass, guitar, Chamberlin, bells, optigan, Marxophone, engineering	
2001	Meaningless	Himself	Producer, lead vocals, bass, guitars, drums, keyboards	
2002	Up	Peter Gabriel	Mandolin and Chamberlin on "More Than This"	
2002	The Last DJ	Tom Petty and the Heartbreakers	Orchestral arrangements, conductor	
2002	The Instigator	Rhett Miller	Producer, bass, guitars, drums, piano, organ, vibraphone, background vocals, co-composer of "Things That Disappear"	
2002	Robyn Sings	Robyn Hitchcock	Guitar	
2002	Restless Night	Julianna Raye	Piano	
2002	No Fear	Abra Moore	Bass, guitar, drums, keyboards	
2002	Largo	Brad Mehldau	Producer, guitar, guitar synthesizer, prepared piano, Chamberlin, percussion, co-composer of "Dropjes"	
2002	Kissin Time	Marianne Faithfull	Drums, keyboards, Chamberlin, celeste, harmonium	
2002	Have You Fed the Fish?	Badly Drawn Boy	Bass, guitars, keyboards Chamberlin, orchestral arrangements, conductor	
2002	Alice Peacock	Alice Peacock	Guitar, organ	
2002	Punch-Drunk Love soundtrack	Himself	Producer, vocals, composer, instrumentation, mixing	
2002	About a Boy soundtrack	Badly Drawn Boy	Bass, guitar, vibraphone, background vocals	
2003	To Whom It May Concern	Lisa Marie Presley	Guitar on "Lights Out"	
2003	Thirteenth Step	A Perfect Circle	Instrumentation on "The Nurse Who Loved Me"	
2003	Return to Planet Earth	Kim Fox	Guitars, ukulele, celeste	
2003	Luxor	Robyn Hitchcock	Guest musician on "You Remind Me of You"	
2003	Blondes Prefer the Gentlemen	The Gentlemen	Chamberlin, mellotron	
2003	Baby I'm Bored	Evan Dando	Co-producer, co-writer (five tracks), instrumentation	
2003	Amorama	Érica García	Guitar, keyboards, sampling	
2004	Virginia Creeper	Grant-Lee Phillips	Ukulele	
2004	The Giant Pin	The Nels Cline Singers	Chamberlin, harmonium, celeste, sampling	
2004	Eternal Sunshine of the Spotless Mind soundtrack	Himself	Producer, vocals, composer, instrumentation, mixing	
2004	Mutual Admiration Society	Mutual Admiration Society	Co-writer (two tracks)	
2004	I Heart Huckabees soundtrack	Himself	Producer, vocals, composer, instrumentation, mixing	
2004	Legion of Boom	The Crystal Method	Guitar on "Realizer"	
2004	From a Basement on the Hill	Elliott Smith	Additional recording	
2004	Everyone Is Here	Finn Brothers	Co-producer, guitars, drums, Harmonium, organ, percussion, programming	
2004	A Strange Mess of Flowers	Davíd Garza	Keyboards	
2005	Winter Pays for Summer	Glen Phillips	Guitar, toy piano	
2005	Self Help Serenade	Marjorie Fair	Bass, drums, piano	
2005	Late Registration	Kanye West	Co-executive producer, instrumentation, string and brass arrangement, "the keys right now"	
2005	Fires	Nerina Pallot	Guitar, keyboards	
2005	Fate Is the Hunter	Kate Earl	Organ	
2005	Extraordinary Machine	Fiona Apple	Co-producer (two tracks), bass, marimba, orchestral arrangement	
2005	Can'tneverdidnothin'	Nikka Costa	Organ on "I Gotta Know", synthesizer on "Happy in the Morning"	
2005	Before the Poison	Marianne Faithfull	Co-writer of "City of Quartz"	
2006	Wait	The Polyphonic Spree	Producer	
2006	The Believer	Rhett Miller	Co-writer of "I Believe She's Lying", bass, guitar, Chamberlain, piano,	
2006	Late Orchestration	Kanye West	Producer	
2006	Friendly Fire	Sean Lennon	Bass, guitars, drums, organ	
2006	Blinders On	Sean Watkins	Piano	
2006	Blue Collar (album)	Rhymefest	Producer and additional instruments "Bullet"	
2007	Graduation	Kanye West	Co-producer on "Drunk and Hot Girls", keyboards on "I Wonder", percussion on "Homecoming"	
2007	Ga Ga Ga Ga Ga	Spoon	Production, bass, Chamberlin on "The Underdog"	
2007	Fuzzbox	The Section Quartet	Producer of "Phenomena"	
2008	Tooth of Crime	T Bone Burnett	Chamberlin, baritone guitar	
2008	Synecdoche, New York soundtrack	Himself	Producer, vocals, composer, instrumentation, mixing	
2008	Safe Trip Home	Dido	Co-producer, co-writer (five tracks), bass, guitars, drums, keyboards, piano, celeste, cello, additional percussion, orchestral arrangements, conductor, mixing	
2008	Perfect Symmetry	Keane	Co-producer on "You Haven't Told Me Anything"	
2008	Let It Come to You	Taylor Eigsti	Co-writer of "Not Ready Yet"	
2008	Big Bad World	Plain White T's	Chamberlin on "1, 2, 3, 4"	
2009	Sara Watkins	Sara Watkins	Writer of "Same Mistakes", guitars	
2009	Rhett Miller	Rhett Miller	Bass, guitar	
2009	Divided by Night	The Crystal Method	Synthesizer on "Divided by Night", marxophone on "Sine Language"	
2009	Christina Courtin	Christina Courtin	Bass, guitars, Chamberlin, marxophone	
2009	Balm in Gilead	Rickie Lee Jones	Bass, guitars	
2009	An Eluardian Instance (Jon Brion Remix EP)	of Montreal & Himself	Producer, composer, instrumentation, mixing	
2010	Mean Old Man	Jerry Lee Lewis	Bass, guitars	
2010	Intriguer	Crowded House	Guitar and vocal samples on "Twice if You're Lucky"	
2010	Highway Rider	Brad Mehldau	Producer, mixing	
2010	False Priest	of Montreal	Co-producer, drums, keyboards, synthesizers, mixing, engineering	
2010	Dirty Baby	Nels Cline	Electric piano, background vocals	
2010	Cho Dependent	Margaret Cho	Co-producer, co-writer, guitar, drums, piano, background vocals on "Enemies"	
2010	Chickens in Love	Various artists	Performer on "So Sleepy" (The Gummy Bears)" by Fiona Apple featuring Brion and the Punch Brothers	
2010	Antifogmatic	Punch Brothers	Producer, mixing, engineering	
2011	The Interpreter: Live at Largo	Rhett Miller	Guitar, drums, piano, background vocals	
2011	Rave On Buddy Holly	Various artists	Production, vocals, guitars, percussion on "Everyday" with Fiona Apple	
2011	Belle	Bic Runga	Guitar, synthesizer, floor tom	
2011	Arthur: Original Motion Picture Soundtrack	Various artists	Producer of "Where Our Destination Lies" & "When the Sun Goes Down" by Benjamin Gibbard	
2011	Christmas	Michael Bublé	Orchestral arrangements on "All I Want for Christmas Is You"	
2012	This Is 40 Soundtrack	Various artists	Producer, composer, instrumentation on "Theme 1 (Debbie and Oliver)"	
2012	Teenage Dream: The Complete Confection	Katy Perry	Producer, instrumentation, "The One That Got Away" (Acoustic)	
2012	The Only Place	Best Coast	Producer, bass, guitars, keyboards, percussion	
2012	Rize of the Fenix	Tenacious D	Bass, synthesizers, and mellotron on "The Ballad of Hollywood Jack and the Rage Kage"	
2012	Pines	A Fine Frenzy	Bass, guitar, keyboards, pump organ	
2012	ParaNorman soundtrack	Himself	Producer, composer, instrumentation, conductor	
2012	Ghost	Sky Ferreira	Co-producer and co-writer of "Ghost"	
2012	Floratone II	Floratone	Keyboards	
2013	Tim McGraw & Friends	Tim McGraw	Featured musician on "Middle Age Crazy"	
2013	The Great Gatsby: Music from Baz Luhrmann's Film	Various artists	Producer of "Crazy in Love" performed by Emeli Sandé and The Bryan Ferry Orchestra	
2013	Girl Who Got Away	Dido	Co-producer, co-writer of "Lost", keyboards, orchestral arrangements, conductor, mixing	
2013	Dreamchaser	Sarah Brightman	Guitar, piano, celeste, vibraphone	
2013	Division Street	Harper Simon	Guitar, synthesizer	
2013	Night Time, My Time B-Sides: Part I	Sky Ferreira	Producer and co-writer of "I'm on Top" and "Werewolf (I Like You)"	
2014	Rock & Roll Time	Jerry Lee Lewis	Guitar	
2014	Heigh Ho	Blake Mills	Piano, tiple	
2016	Young in All the Wrong Ways	Sara Watkins	Bass, guitar, piano, celeste, mellotron	
2016	Lemonade	Beyonce	Orchestral arrangements	
2016	Rainbow Ends	Emitt Rhodes	Guitar on "Dog on a Chain"	
2016	Blonde	Frank Ocean	Co-producer, keyboards, orchestral arrangements, drum programming	
2017	The Dream	Tashaki Miyaki	Musician	
2017	Lady Bird soundtrack	Himself	Producer, composer, instrumentation	
2018	Dirty Computer	Janelle Monáe	Co-producer, writer of "Jane's Dream", synthesizer, mallets	
2018	Swimming	Mac Miller	Co-producer, co-writer of "Come Back to Earth", "Hurt Feelings", "Perfecto", "Ladders", "Small Worlds", "2009", and "So It Goes".	
2018	Christopher Robin: Original Motion Picture Soundtrack	Himself & Geoff Zanelli	Co-composer	
	World on Sticks	Sam Phillips	Electric Guitar - "Teilhard", Bass, Loops [Guitar Loop] - "Continuous Loop".	
2019	Western Stars	Bruce Springsteen	Guitars, timpani, sitar, celesta, drums, synthesizer	
2020	Circles	Mac Miller	Completed production after Miller's death	
2023	Joy'All	Jenny Lewis	Chamberlin	
2024	Good at Love	Paige Stark	Producer	
2024	Older	Lizzy McAlpine	Piano on 'All Falls Down"	
2024	Highway Prayers	Billy Strings	Producer, bass, drums, percussion	
