= I Heart Huckabees =

2004 film by David O. Russell

- Theatrical release poster
- Directed by: David O. Russell
- Written by: Jeff Baena; David O. Russell
- Produced by: Gregory Goodman; David O. Russell; Scott Rudin
- Starring: Dustin Hoffman; Isabelle Huppert; Jude Law; Jason Schwartzman; Lily Tomlin; Mark Wahlberg; Naomi Watts
- Cinematography: Peter Deming
- Edited by: Robert K. Lambert
- Music by: Jon Brion
- Production companies: Qwerty Films; Scott Rudin Productions
- Distributed by: Fox Searchlight Pictures
- Release dates: September 10, 2004 (TIFF); October 1, 2004
- Running time: 106 minutes
- Countries: United States; United Kingdom
- Language: English
- Budget: $20 million
- Box office: $20.1 million

I Heart Huckabees (stylized as i ♥ huckabees;) is a 2004 philosophical comedy-drama film directed and produced by David O. Russell, who cowrote the screenplay with Jeff Baena.

A self-described "existential comedy", I Heart Huckabees follows a pair of detectives (Dustin Hoffman and Lily Tomlin) hired to investigate the meaning of the life of their clients (Jude Law, Jason Schwartzman, Mark Wahlberg and Naomi Watts). As the different investigations cross paths, their rival and nemesis (Isabelle Huppert) tries to drag their clients into her own views on the meaning of their lives. The film received mixed reviews and was a box office failure, only grossed $20 million worldwide on the budget of $20 million.

== Plot ==
Young Albert Markovski heads the local chapter of the "Open Spaces Coalition" environmental group. One of their current projects is stopping the building of a new "big-box" department store, Huckabees.

Albert is a rival of Brad Stand, a shallow executive at Huckabees. Brad infiltrates Open Spaces and charismatically displaces Albert as the leader. Dawn Campbell is Brad's live-in girlfriend and the face and voice of Huckabees, appearing in all the store's ads.

After seeing the same conspicuous stranger three times, Albert contacts a couple of existential detectives, Bernard and Vivian Jaffe. They offer him their optimistic brand of existentialism—they call it universal interconnectivity (similar to romantic, transcendentalist, and many Eastern philosophies)—and spy on him, ostensibly to help him solve the coincidence. Fireman Tommy Corn is another client of the Jaffes', with an idealistic, obsessively anti-petroleum-industry philosophy. They introduce Albert to Tommy as his "other", and they become friends.

Tommy grows dissatisfied with the Jaffes, feeling they are not helping. Seeking other possibilities, he ends up abandoning (and undermining) the Jaffes by introducing Albert to Caterine Vauban, a former student of the Jaffes who espouses a seemingly opposing nihilistic/pessimist philosophy.

Caterine teaches them to disconnect their inner beings from their daily lives and problems; to synthesize a non-thinking state of "pure being". Lifted from their troubles, they wish to keep that feeling forever. However, she says it is inevitable to be drawn back into human drama, and the core truth of it is misery and meaninglessness. To prove her point, Caterine takes Albert into the woods to have sex, leaving Tommy behind. He finds out about it and feels hurt. She tells him that they found each other through all the human suffering and drama. Tommy rejects this idea and leaves them, furious and lost.

Meanwhile, in Brad's further attempts to undercut Albert, he and Dawn meet with and are influenced by Bernard and Vivian. In the subsequent days, Brad and Dawn rethink their entire lives; she rejects the modeling world, looking for deeper meaning, while he realizes his whole ascent up the corporate ladder is meaningless, for he has focused his whole life on trying to please others and not himself.

All the storylines collide when Brad's house catches fire. While the fire trucks get stuck in a traffic jam, Tommy arrives on his bicycle to put out the fire, which also trapped Dawn inside. As he saves her life, they fall in love. Meanwhile, Brad despairs at the destruction of his home, the symbol of his material success. Albert attains a sort of enlightenment when he synthesizes the two opposing outlooks of the Jaffes and Caterine, to realize the cosmic truth of everything.

Brad, meanwhile, is fired from Huckabees, leaving him rudderless. Albert reveals to him that the fire started when he burned Brad's jet skis, and it spread to the rest of the house. He says they are no different; that everything really is inextricably connected, but that these connections necessarily arise from the often senselessly painful reality of human existence. Having realized this, he refers Brad to Caterine, believing she can help him as she did Albert and Tommy.

Albert and Tommy talk later about everything that has happened. Caterine and the Jaffes watch them from afar, concluding they can close both of their cases.

== Cast ==
- Dustin Hoffman as Bernard Jaffe
- Isabelle Huppert as Caterine Vauban
- Jude Law as Brad Stand
- Jason Schwartzman as Albert Markovski
- Lily Tomlin as Vivian Jaffe
- Mark Wahlberg as Tommy Corn
- Naomi Watts as Dawn Campbell
- Ger Duany as Stephen Nimieri
- Isla Fisher as Heather
- Sydney Zarp as Cricket Hooten
- Jonah Hill as Bret Hooten
- Richard Jenkins as Mr. Hooten (uncredited)
- Darlene Hunt as Darlene
- Kevin Dunn as Marty
- Benny Hernandez as Davy
- Richard Appel as Josh
- Benjamin Nurick as Harrison
- Jake Muxworthy as Tim
- Tippi Hedren as Mary Jane Hutchinson
- Altagracia Guzman as Mrs. Echevarria
- Saïd Taghmaoui as Translator
- Bob Gunton as Mr. Silver
- Talia Shire as Mrs. Silver
- Jean Smart as Mrs. Hooten
- Shania Twain as Herself
- Kamala Lopez as Molly Corn (billed as Kamala Lopez-Dawson)

The film features the screen debuts of Jonah Hill (in a minor role) and Ger Duany.

== Production ==
Before directing his first feature, Spanking the Monkey, Russell intended to make a film "about a guy who sits in the back of a Chinese restaurant with microphones on every table to surreptitiously listen to everybody's conversations, then write perversely personal fortunes for each of the people".

Hitting a writer's block, Russell could not figure out how to make the film work. In the meantime, Russell was called for jury duty, after which he stopped writing the film. Ideas in the script stayed with him, though, and they would eventually form the basis for the Huckabee script. The final idea came to Russell in a dream in which "this female detective, she was not following me for criminal reasons, but she was following me for spiritual and metaphysical reasons". Russell, with a habit of writing down his dreams, knew instantly on reading his summary of the dream that this was the story he wanted to pursue.

=== Incident between David O. Russell and Lily Tomlin ===
In March 2007, two videos were leaked onto YouTube portraying on-set arguments between Russell and Tomlin. When the Miami New Times asked Tomlin about the videos, she responded, "I love David. There was a lot of pressure in making the movie — even the way it came out you could see it was a very free-associative, crazy movie, and David was under a tremendous amount of pressure. And he's a very free-form kind of guy anyway."

== Soundtrack ==
Jon Brion provided the score and seven original songs for the film. His methods for writing his previous film scores (Punch-Drunk Love and Eternal Sunshine of the Spotless Mind) involved very close collaboration with the director. Through this process, David O. Russell was able to sit in the same room with Brion and watch an early cut of the film. Russell described what he wanted to portray, and Brion would compose music to Russell's descriptions. The process can be seen in a featurette on the film's special edition DVD.

David O. Russell, while working with Brion, came across Brion's first solo album, Meaningless. Russell has mentioned that Brion's album asks similar questions to the ones Russell was trying to ask with I Heart Huckabees. In particular, Russell notes that the questions on Meaningless are closer to the questions directed from Caterine Vauban's negative and dark point of view.

Many cues used in the film feature a Chamberlin, a keyboard instrument from the 1950s that replicates instrumental sounds using recorded tape.

== Release ==
=== Marketing ===
In an advertising campaign for the film, four fictional websites were created. They were portrayed as if they were actual websites involving the characters and organizations featured in the film. Each website had a link called "Disclaimer" at the bottom that lead to FOX Searchlight's official website for the film. Websites were rendered inactive a few months after release, each one redirecting to FOX Searchlight's website.

- Huckabees Corporation: The "official" website for the chain of Huckabees stores. Featured the store history, announcements, three television ads featuring Dawn Campbell, and a banner promoting the Huckabees collaboration with the Open Spaces Coalition.
- Open Spaces Coalition: This website described the importance of the marshlands that Albert Markovski is trying to protect, as well as ways of aiding the cause. The site also contained poetry written by Markovski, and downloadable flyers.
- Existential Detectives: The website promoting the Jaffes' detective agency. It explained the methodology of the detectives. It had two case studies and an online questionnaire.
- Caterine Vauban: The website of Caterine Vauban, author of If Not Now. The site contained reviews and excerpts from the book.

=== Box office ===
I Heart Huckabees opened in a limited release October 1, 2004, earning $292,177, and ranking number 24 in the weekend's box office. The film was granted a wide release three weeks later on October 22, earning $2,902,468, and ranking tenth at the box office. At the end of its run, the film grossed $12,785,432 domestically, and $7,286,740 overseas, for a worldwide total of $20,072,172.

== Reception ==
The film received generally mixed reviews from critics. Some critics were displeased with the existential subject matter, and said the script was unfocused, while others celebrated its performances (especially Wahlberg's) and originality. On the review aggregator website Rotten Tomatoes, 63% of 191 critics' reviews are positive, with an average rating of 6.4/10. The website's consensus reads: "I Heart Huckabees certainly isn't for everyone, but audiences attuned to its quirky wavelength will find a singularly brainy screwball comedy that refuses to pander." Metacritic reports a 55 rating out of 100, based on 40 critics, indicating "mixed or average" reviews.

In an article for New Review of Film and Television Studies, film scholar Kim Wilkins labeled the dialogue in I Heart Huckabees "hyper-dialogue", which is described as "intensified, unevenly fluctuating, and often ironically inflected use of dialogue in the place of action".

== See also ==
- Deconstruction
- Synchronicity
- American Eccentric Cinema
