= Punch-Drunk Love (soundtrack) =

Soundtrack album by Jon Brion
- Released: November 5, 2002
- Genre: Soundtrack
- Length: 44:08
- Label: Nonesuch
- Producer: Jon Brion

Jon Brion chronology
Meaningless (2001)	Punch-Drunk Love (2002)	Eternal Sunshine of the Spotless Mind (2004)

Punch-Drunk Love is the 2002 soundtrack album featuring music composed by Jon Brion for the film of the same name. The album includes the song "He Needs Me" by Shelley Duvall from Robert Altman's 1980 film Popeye. The soundtrack received an enthusiastic review from classical music critic Greg Sandow.

Brion provides main vocals (in addition to playing most of the instruments) in the song "Here We Go".

== Track listing ==
All tracks composed by Jon Brion except where otherwise noted.

1. "Overture" – 2:09
2. "Tabla" – 2:59
3. "Punch-Drunk Melody" – 1:43
4. "Hands and Feet" – 3:42
5. "Le Petit Chateau" – 1:36
6. "Alleyway" – 0:55
7. "Punchy Tack Piano" – 1:25
8. "He Needs Me" – 3:31
  - original composition by Harry Nilsson, original vocals by Shelley Duvall, remix and additional composition by Jon Brion and Jonathan Karp
9. "Waikiki" – 3:56
  - performed by Ladies K, original composition by Andy Cummings
10. "Moana Chimes" – 3:03
  - original composition by Johnny Noble and M.K. Moke
11. "Hospital" – 1:21
12. "Danny (Lonely Blue Boy)" – 2:13
  - performed by Conway Twitty, original composition by Ben Weisman and Fred Wise
13. "Healthy Choice" – 2:10
14. "Third Floor Hallway" – 3:23
15. "Blossoms & Blood" – 2:05
16. "Here We Go" – 4:47
17. "He Really Needs Me" – 3:10
