= 2003 Soul Train Lady of Soul Awards =

American awards show

Soul Train Lady of Soul Awards
- Date: August 23, 2003
- Location: Pasadena Civic Auditorium, Pasadena, California
- Country: United States

Highlights
- Most awards: Floetry (3)

The 2003 Soul Train Lady of Soul Awards were held on August 23, 2003 at the Pasadena Civic Auditorium in Pasadena, California. The ninth annual awards program was hosted by Arsenio Hall, Aisha Tyler, Heather Headley and Tyrese.

== Special awards ==
=== Aretha Franklin Award for Entertainer of the Year ===
- Erykah Badu

=== Lena Horne Award for Outstanding Career Achievement ===
- Vivica A. Fox

== Winners and nominees ==
Winners are in bold text.

=== Best R&B/Soul Single – Solo ===
- **Erykah Badu – "Love of My Life (An Ode to Hip-Hop)"**
  - Vivian Green – "Emotional Rollercoaster"
  - Heather Headley – "He Is"
  - Monica – "So Gone"

=== Best R&B/Soul Single – Group, Band or Duo ===
- **Floetry – "Say Yes"**
  - 3LW – "I Do (Wanna Get Close to You)"
  - 702 – "I Still Love You"
  - TLC – "Girl Talk"

=== R&B/Soul Album of the Year – Solo ===
- **Heather Headley – This Is Who I Am**
  - Vivian Green – A Love Story
  - Whitney Houston – Just Whitney
  - India.Arie – Voyage to India

=== R&B/Soul Album of the Year – Group, Band or Duo ===
- **Floetry – Floetic**
  - 702 – Star
  - TLC – 3D
  - Jazzyfatnastees – The Tortoise & the Hare

=== Best R&B/Soul or Rap New Artist – Solo ===
- **Heather Headley – "He Is"**
  - Vivian Green – "Emotional Rollercoaster"
  - Oobie featuring Lil Jon & The East Side Boyz – "Nothin's Free"
  - Amanda Perez – "Angel"

=== Best R&B/Soul or Rap New Artist – Group, Band or Duo ===
- **Floetry – "Say Yes"**
  - LovHer – "How It's Gonna Be"
  - TG4 – "Virginity"

=== R&B/Soul or Rap Song of the Year ===
- **Missy Elliott – "Work It"**
  - Erykah Badu – "Love of My Life (An Ode to Hip-Hop)"
  - Brandy – "Full Moon"
  - Floetry – "Floetic"

=== Best R&B/Soul or Rap Music Video ===
- **Missy Elliott – "Work It"**
  - Erykah Badu – "Love of My Life (An Ode to Hip-Hop)"
  - Lil' Kim – "The Jump Off"
  - Solange – "Feelin' You (Part II)"

=== Best Gospel Album ===
- **Dorinda Clark-Cole – Dorinda Clark-Cole**
  - Mary Mary – Incredible
  - Dottie Peoples – Churchin' with Dottie
  - Angela Spivey – Determined
