= Floetry discography =

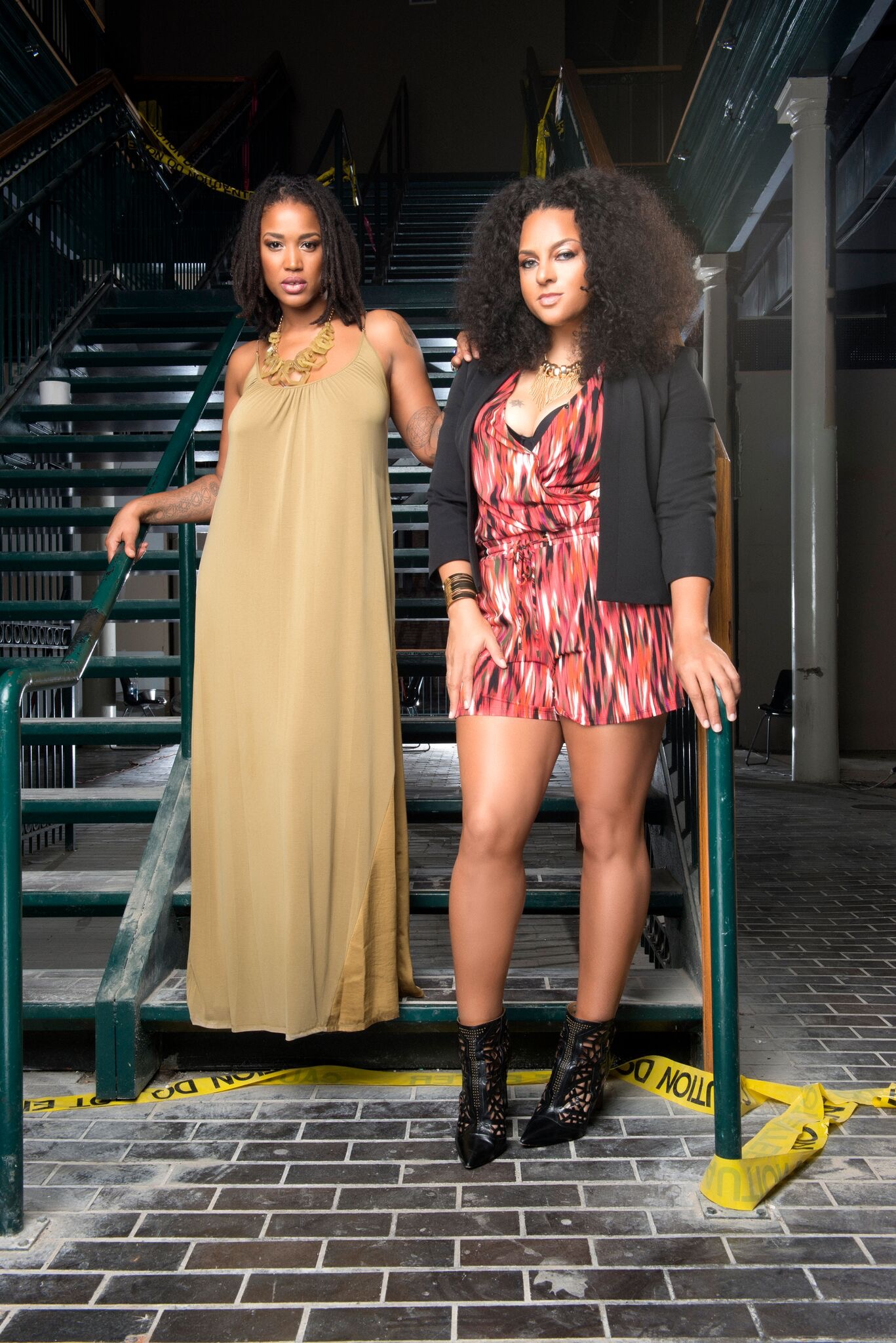
- Studio albums: 2
- Live albums: 1
- Singles: 6
- Video albums: 1
- Music videos: 4

English music duo Floetry has released two studio albums, one live album/concert film, and six singles.

Floetry first charted in August 2002 with their debut single "Floetic", which peaked in the top thirty on the U.S. Hot R&B/Hip-Hop Songs chart. In October 2002, they released their debut album Floetic. The album sold over 864,000 copies in the U.S. and earned a gold certification by the Recording Industry Association of America (RIAA). The album's second single "Say Yes" became their most successful song, peaking at number twenty-four on the Billboard Hot 100. They released their live album and concert film Floacism "Live", recorded at the New Orleans House of Blues, in November 2003. The album spawn the sole single "Wanna B Where U R (Thisizzaluvsong)", which featured American rapper Mos Def.

In November 2005, they released their second album Flo'Ology, which sold over 363,000 copies in the U.S. The song "SupaStar", which featured American rapper Common, was released as the lead single and performed moderately successful on the charts. Their final single "Lay Dawn" charted in the top-twenty on the U.S. Adult R&B Songs chart. As of 2016, Floetry has sold over 2 million records worldwide.

== Albums ==
=== Studio albums ===
Title	Details	Peak chart positions			Sales	Certifications (sales threshold)
Title	Details	UK	US	US R&B	Sales	Certifications (sales threshold)
Floetic	Release date: 1 October 2002; Label: DreamWorks; Formats: CD, cassette	—	19	4	US: 864,000 (as of 2010)	RIAA: Gold
Flo'Ology	Release date: 8 November 2005; Label: Geffen; Formats: CD, music download	167	7	2	US: 363,000 (as of 2010)	
"—" denotes releases that did not chart

=== Live albums ===
Title	Details	Peak chart positions		Sales
Title	Details	US	US R&B	Sales
Floacism "Live"	Release date: 18 November 2003; Label: DreamWorks Records; Formats: CD, DVD	74	11	US: 159,000 (as of 2005)

== Singles ==
Title	Year	Peak chart positions					Album
Title	Year	UK	US	US Adult R&B	US Dance	US R&B	Album
"Floetic"	2002	73	113	—	—	29	Floetic
"Say Yes"	2003	—	24	1	—	8	Floetic
"Getting Late"	2003	—	114	17	—	31	Floetic
"Wanna B Where U R (Thisizzaluvsong)" (featuring Mos Def)	2003	—	—	—	—	116	Floacism
"SupaStar" (featuring Common)	2005	—	—	40	15	55	Flo'Ology
"Lay Down"	2005	—	—	19	—	102	Flo'Ology
"—" denotes releases that did not chart

== Guest appearances ==
List of non-single guest appearances, with other performing artists, showing year released and album name
Title	Year	Other artist(s)	Album
"What Happ'n"	2002	Scratch	The Embodiment Of Instrumentation
"She Want Me"	2002	Journalist	Scribes of Life
"The Way It Used To Be"	2002	Journalist	Scribes of Life
"Supposed To"	2003	Mr. Cheeks	Back Again!
"Let's Get Wild"	2003	Mr. Cheeks	Back Again!
"My Man"	2004	Angie Stone	Stone Love
"Hear My Cry"	2004	Patti Labelle	Timeless Journey
"Not in Love" (Remix)	2004	Enrique Iglesias	Not in Love - Single
"Elevated"	2004	Earth, Wind & Fire	Illumination
"Wake Up Everybody"	2004	Various artists	Wake Up Everybody
"Automatique"	2005	Blackalicious	The Craft

== Songwriting credits ==
List of non-single guest appearances, with other performing artists, showing year released and album name
Title	Year	Artist(s)	Album
"Negros"	2000	Omar Sosa	Bembon
"You Are"	2001	Bilal	1st Born Second
"What Happ'n"	2002	Scratch	The Embodiment Of Instrumentation
"Supposed To"	2003	Mr. Cheeks	Back Again!
"Let's Get Wild"	2003	Mr. Cheeks	Back Again!
"Beautiful Day"	2003	Jeff Bradshaw	Bone Deep
"Hoffnung"	2003	Curse	Und Was Ist Jetzt
"My Man"	2004	Angie Stone	Stone Love
"Hear My Cry"	2004	Patti Labelle	Timeless Journey
"Elevated"	2004	Earth, Wind & Fire	Illumination
"Automatique"	2005	Blackalicious	The Craft
