= Floetic Soul =

Studio album by The Floacist
- Released: November 9, 2010
- Recorded: 2010
- Genre: R&B, neo soul
- Length: 54:00
- Label: Shanachie Entertainment
- Producer: Natalie Stewart; Nolan Weekes; Danny Weiss; Chris "Big Dog" Davis; Teddy Douglas; JR Hutson; Kid Easy; Sound Brigade

The Floacist chronology
Spoken Soul Volume 1 (2010)	Floetic Soul (2010)	Floetry Re:Birth (2012)

Singles from Floetic Soul
- 1. "Forever" Released: 1 October 2010; 2. "Let Me" Released: 25 January 2011; 3. "Keep It Going" Released: 9 June 2011

Floetic Soul is the debut solo studio album by English singer-songwriter and performance poet The Floacist. It was released on 9 November 2010, by Shanachie Records.

Following the disbandment of English music duo Floetry, Stewart took a music hiatus before re-emerging in 2009. She co-headlined a concert tour and also performed with several music acts. As the executive producer of the album, Stewart took a wider role in its production, co-writing a majority of the songs, choosing which ones to produce and sharing ideas on mixing and mastering. Musically, the album is a mixture of mid-tempo tracks and ballads, all of which are primarily R&B songs.

== Background and development ==
In 1997, Stewart formed with music duo called Floetry with English singer Marsha Ambrosius. The duo was launched into mainstream recognition with the release of their song "Floetic" and their best-selling album, Floetic (2002), which contained the U.S. Adult R&B Songs number-one single "Say Yes". The album, Floetic, became a commercial success and received a gold certification by the Recording Industry Association of America (RIAA). Floetry followed up by touring as the opening act for several notable music acts. Their performance at the New Orleans House of Blues was recorded and released as a live album titled Floacism "Live" in November 2003. In November 2005, Floetry resurfaced with the release of their second studio album Flo'Ology. The album spawned the singles "SupaStar" and "Lay Down".

Despite critical and commercial success, the duo was disbanded as Stewart attempted to split from the duo's management as Irving wanted to change the group's musical style and image. In response, Ambrosius proceeded with a concert tour referred to as the Floetry Remix Tour. Despite being marketed as a Floetry tour with Stewart's likeness, Stewart was not part of the tour and attempted to resolve the situation. After a failed resolve, Stewart announced the Wendy Williams Radio Show that Floetry tour was misleading as it did not include her. At the conclusion of the tour, the members pursued solo careers. After a four-year hiatus, Stewart resurfaced and co-headlined a two-month long American tour with Yo Majesty in 2009. In early 2010, Stewart signed a recording contract with American record label Shanachie Records. In June 2010, she released a limited-edition extended play titled Spoken Soul Volume 1.

== Recording and production ==
What's really nice with this new direction is it's actually an embellished direction — it's the embellishment of being an artist, the age of maturity, life, what all of those things can add. What people know Floetry for is poetic delivery with musical intent and what's new about this record is no one has ever heard me do solo music; it's a concentrated opinion coming through modernizing. I'm exploring myself and the transparency comes from me getting out of my comfort zones.

—The Floacist (Essence Magazine interview)

Stewart recorded the album in twelve days in 2010. Unlike previous music releases with Floetry, Stewart took on performing the chorus of several songs on the album. She recorded majority of the album at Platinum Sound Studios in California, while the rest of the album was recorded at CDS Studios in Wallingford, Connecticut. She also recorded at Free Sum Music Studios in the United Kingdom; owned by Stewart and then-husband and co-producer Nolan Weekes. Weekes also co-executive produced the album along with Stewart and Shanachie A&R executive Danny Weiss.

She collaborated with songwriters and music producers that she had never worked in the past, including Chris "Big Dog" Davis, Teddy Douglas, JR Hutson, Kid Easy, and production duo Sound Brigade (Salem Brown and D.L 4.0). In an interview with The Houma Courier, Stewart stated she "wanted a certain message to be going out, something especially for women, where we could empower ourselves and not be so petty in our relationships with each other as sisters." She also worked with Raheem DeVaughn, who co-wrote "Keep It Going". Musiq Soulchild appeared on the duet "Forever".

== Release and promotion ==
On 25 September 2010, Gail Mitchell of Billboard magazine announced that Stewart would be releasing her debut album in November 2010. Floetic Soul was released by Shanachie Entertainment on 9 November 2010.

=== Singles ===
"Forever", which features American singer Musiq Soulchild and produced by JR Hutson, was released as the album's lead single on 1 October 2010. The song was made a free digital download on American online magazine SoulTracks for October's "Free Song of the Month". By 17 October, the song created a new milestone on SoulTracks, having been downloaded over 5,000 times and breaking a record previously by American singer Conya Doss with her song "What We Gone Do". A music video, directed by Kahlil Joseph, was released to Shanachie Entertainment's YouTube page. On 25 January 2011, The Floacist released "Let Me" as the second single along with a music video, directed by her then-husband Nolan Weekes.

In June 2011, "Keep It Going", which features American singer Raheem DeVaughn, was released as the album's third single. A music video was released to Shanachie Entertainment's YouTube page. While a music video was filmed for the song "Breathe", the song was not official released as a single.

== Critical reception ==
Professional ratings
Review scores
Source	Rating
AllMusic	3/5 stars

AllMusic's Andy Kellman praised Stewart's performance on the Floetic Soul by stating, "The woman can hold her own. For Floetry fans who wanted Stewart, the Floacist, to be given more time in the spotlight, Floetic Soul should be worth the wait." Billboard magazine praised her vocal performance on the song "You", commenting that it is "something she should do more of next time."

Kit O'Toole of the Seattle Post-Intelligencer gave a mixed review and compared Floetic Soul to Floetry's Floetic 2002 album, remarking, "The Floacist's album does contain similar material, but more diversity would be welcome. She has released an interesting debut that should please Floetic fans, and this disc should establish her as a unique neo-soul artist. On future releases, The Floacist should further explore her singing voice and continue inviting guest vocalists to balance out the spoken word poetry."

== Commercial performance ==
In the United States, Floetic Soul debuted at number ninety-five on the Billboard 200 during the week of 27 November 2010. It debuted at number seven on the US Top Independent Albums chart and number twenty on the US Top R&B/Hip-Hop Albums chart, selling over 5,000 copies in the United States.

== Track listing ==
Floetic Soul track listing
No.	Title	Writer(s)	Producer(s)	Length
1.	"Breathe"	Natalie Stewart; Lee Hutson; Eric Rousseau	Kid Easy; JR Hutson	3:54
2.	"Keep It Going" (featuring Raheem DeVaughn)	Stewart; Teddy Douglas; Nolan Weekes	Teddy Douglas; Nolan Weekes	4:05
3.	"Need You"	Stewart; Chris Davis	Chris "Big Dog" Davis	5:12
4.	"Forever" (featuring Musiq Soulchild)	Stewart; Hutson	JR Hutson	5:05
5.	"You"	Stewart; JR Hutson	JR Hutson	3:48
6.	"Come Over" (featuring Lalah Hathaway)	Stewart; Weekes	Weekes	3:57
7.	"What R U Looking 4?"	Stewart; Davis	Davis	4:24
8.	"What U Gonna Do?"	Stewart; Davis	Davis	3:51
9.	"Go Get It"	Stewart; Hutson	Hutson	3:35
10.	"Overtime"	Stewart; Hutson	Hutson	3:26
11.	"Let Me"	Stewart; Hutson	Hutson	3:54
12.	"The Stand"	Stewart; Salem Brown; Weeks	Sound Brigade	4:25
13.	"Alright Then"	Stewart; Davis	Davis	4:33
Total length:				54:00

== Credits ==
Adapted from the Floetic Soul liner notes

Musicians

- Natalie Stewart – lead vocals, background vocals (all tracks)
- Theljon Allen – flugelhorn, trumpet (track 12)
- Jeff Bradshaw – trombone (track 3)
- Wayne Bruce – guitar (track 3)
- Damion Greaves – keyboard (track 6)
- Curtis Jones Jr. – trombone (track 12)
- Brandon Moultrie – alto saxophone
- Mike Rodriguez – trumpet (tracks 8, 13)
- Michael 'Remmi' Weekes – bass, guitar, strings (tracks 2, 6)

Technical

- Dave Darlington – mixing (tracks 2, 6, 12)
- Chris "Big Dog" Davis – engineering, mixing (tracks 3, 7, 8, 13)
- Kurt (The Cop) Hoffler – assistant engineering – engineering
- Ryan Moys – mixing (tracks 1, 4, 5, 9 to 11)
- Bill Pratt – engineering (track 2)
