= Andre Harris =

American record producer

André "Dre" Harris
- Origin: Philadelphia, Pennsylvania, U.S.
- Genres: R&B; hip hop; soul; gospel
- Occupations: Songwriter; record producer
- Years active: 1995–present

Andre "Dre" Harris is an American songwriter and record producer.

== Biography ==
Born and raised in Philadelphia, Pennsylvania, Harris grew up in a city known for its contributions to Black American music, namely the sub-genre of Philly soul. Deriving his inspiration from the local musicians that played with a lot of the major artists that came out of the City of Brotherly Love, as well as his musical family, he started playing drums in the church when he was just seven years old. Harris kept with his love for music throughout his youth; eventually teaching himself to play piano, guitar and bass during his teenage years.

His professional break came when he was introduced to DJ Jazzy Jeff as a musician in the early 1990s, and began collaborating with him and other producers at his studio. There, Harris spent a lot of time in the studio working with local Philly acts that were a part of the city's neo-soul scene. In 1995, Harris signed a production agreement with the legendary hip-hop DJ & producer, and became a part of his A Touch of Jazz team along with five other emerging producers. During the five years he spent under Jazzy Jeff's guidance, Harris worked with Jill Scott, Musiq Soulchild, Floetry, Will Smith, and Michael Jackson, to name a few.

In 2000, Harris and fellow A Touch of Jazz alumnus Vidal Davis decided to go off on their own and work as Dre & Vidal. The two were inspired by another famous Philadelphia songwriter/producer duo – Gamble & Huff. The writing and producing duo is credited with creating hits for Usher ("Caught Up"), Chris Brown ("Yo [Excuse Me Miss]"), Ciara ("Oh"), Mariah Carey ("Clown"), Destiny's Child ("T-Shirt"), Musiq Soulchild ("Love"), Floetry ("Say Yes"), and Jill Scott ("The Way"), among others.

They went on to win two Grammy Awards in 2005 for their work on Alicia Keys' The Diary of Alicia Keys, and Usher's Confessions. In 2009, they won a third Grammy Award for Best Contemporary R&B Album for Mary J. Blige's Growing Pains.

Since 2010, Harris has been working independently as a producer. Most recently, he lent his soulful production to Burna Boy, Justin Bieber, Kanye West, Melanie Fiona, Mali Music, and Pharrell's I Am Other signee Cris Cab. He also co-executive produced Jill Scott's album Woman. Harris' signature style of mixing live instruments with studio production continues to be one of his most sought-after sounds.

== Production discography ==
- 3LW – "Point of No Return", "Hot", "I Wish", "Up To You"
- Melanie Fiona – "Bite The Bullet", "I Tried"
- Cris Cab – "Turn Out the Lights" (featuring J Balvin), "Higher Ground"
- Daley – "Be", "The Truth"
- Bilal – "You Are"
- Mali Music – "Walking Shoes"
- Bo Saris – "The Addict"
- Carl Thomas – "Conquer", "Round 2", "All You've Giving"
- Jennifer Hudson – "What You Think"
- Anthony Hamilton – "Broken Man", "The Truth", "Some Kind Of Wonderful"
- Kanye West – "I'm In It"
- Yuna – "Fading Flower", "Remember My Name", "Stay"
- Alicia Keys – "So Simple"
- Mario – "Good News Bad News", "Do For Love", "Don't Do It", "Get A Lil More", "I'm Trying To Be Down" "Missin' My Woman", "Come Back To Me", "Before She Said Hi" feat. Big Sean
- Amerie – "Just Like Me"
- Donell Jones – "Do It All"
- Ludacris – "War With God", "Press the Start Button"
- Fantasia – "Baby Makin' Hips", "I Nominate You"
- Sammie – "What About Your Friend"
- Michael Jackson – "Butterflies"
- Trey Songz – "Store Run"
- Bobby V featuring Fabolous – "Let Him Go"
- Musiq Soulchild – "Love", "One Night", "Girl Next Door",17, You and me against the world,
- Deitrick Haddon – "Where You Are","One Blood", "Soul Survivor
- Destiny's Child – "T-Shirt"
- Floetry – "Ms. Stress", "Sunshine", "Getting Late", "Mr. Messed Up", "Say Yes", "Hello", "Hey You", "Possibilities"
- Marsha Ambrosius – "Your Hands", "Every Now & Again"
- The Game – "Hustler's Dream"
- Jamie Foxx – "Go To Waste"
- Joe – "Perfect Match", "Do It All", "Coulda Been the 1"
- Justin Bieber – "All That Matters", "All Bad", "Change Me", "We Are"
- Kirk Franklin – "Better"
- Ginuwine – "More"
- Macy Gray – "Things That Made Me Change"
- Rico Love – "Ride"
- Mary J. Blige – "Hurt Again", "Can't Hide From Love", "Father In You", "Gotta Be Something More", "Power of Love", "Hold On (featuring Ludacris)", "Give Me Your Love Or Way Down", "Would Have Gave It All", "Healing"
- Chris Brown – "Yo (Excuse Me Miss)","Poppin'", "Hold Up", "Apology", "Troubled Waters"
- Ciara – "Oh"
- Mariah Carey – "Clown", "Lullaby"
- Glenn Lewis – "Lonely", "Is It True", "It's Not Fair", "Don't You Forget It", "Time Soon Come", "Back For More", "All My Love feat. Melanie Fiona", "Make Luv", "What A Fool Believes Better With Time", "All I See"
- Monica – "Stop", "Thought You Had My Back"
- Jill Scott – "Jilltro", "Do You Remember", "Gettin' In The Way", "A Long Walk", "The Way", "Love Rain", "One Is The Magic #", "Show Me", "Easy Conversation", "Free", "One Time", "Sweet Justice", "Nothing (Interlude)", "Rasool", "My Petition", "I Keep", "The Light", "The Real Thing", "Rightness", "Blessed", "Wild Cookie", "Prepared", "Run Run Run", "Can't Wait", "Lighthouse", "Fool's Gold", "Willing (Interlude)", "Closure", "You Don't Know", "Pause (Interlude)", "Cruisin", "Say Thank You", "Back Together", "Coming To You", "Jahraymecofasola", "Beautiful Love"
- Ruben Studdard – "After The Candles Burn"
- Usher – "Caught Up", "Superstar", "Follow Me", "Here I Stand", "Love You Gently", "Hush"
- Charlie Wilson – "Keep It Movin", "Stamina"
- Young Buck – "I'm a Soldier", "Walk with Me"
- The Notorious B.I.G. – "1970 Somethin'" (featuring The Game & Faith Evans)
- Donell Jones – "Do It All"
- Ludacris – "War With God", "Press the Start Button"
- Kelly Clarkson – "The Day We Fell Apart"
- Flo Rida – "Shone" (featuring Pleasure P)
- Robin Thicke – "2 Luv Birds"
- Jessica Mauboy – "Nobody Knows"
- Guy Sebastian – "If I Really Loved You", "Who's That Girl"
- Beanie Siegel – "What They Gonna Say To Me", "The Day", "Prayer", "Dear Self (Can I Talk To You)"
- Crystal Aikin – "Lord, You Reign Forever"
- Miguel – "To the Moon", "Hero", "Nothing"
- Lalah Hathaway – "Strong Woman", "Lie To Me"
- Kindred the Family Soul – "Stars", "Alright", "Rightfully So", "No Limit", "The Sheddington (Intro)", "Magic Happen", "Authentically You", "S.O.S. (Sense of Security)", "The Sheddington (Outro)", "Loving The Night", "One Day Soon", "Not Complaining", "Never Loved You More", "Drop The Bomb", "Look At What We Made", "What I've Learned"
- Vivian Green – "Anything Out There", "I'm Not Prepared"
- RichGirl - "Swagger Right"
- H.E.R. - "Wait For It"
- BJ The Chicago Kid - "Time Today"
- Estelle - "Lights Out", "One More Time
- Ro James - "Outside the Box"
- Sir (singer) - "Summer in November", "All In My Head", "Queen", "Ohh Nah Nah" (feat. Masego)
- Dorion Renaud - "I'm Good On You" (featuring Stacy Barthe), "3 of Us"
- Kash Doll – "13th Amendment"
- Stonebwoy – "Nominate" (featuring Keri Hilson)
- Sauti Sol – "Sober" from Midnight Train
- Ty Dolla $ign – "Its Your Turn"
- Burna Boy – "Time Flies"
