= 2003 MTV Video Music Awards =

Award ceremony

- Date: Thursday, August 28, 2003
- Location: Radio City Music Hall, New York, New York
- Country: United States
- Hosted by: Chris Rock
- Most awards: Beyoncé, Coldplay & Justin Timberlake (3 each)
- Most nominations: Missy Elliott (8)
- Website: http://www.mtv.com/ontv/vma/past-vmas/2003/

Television/radio coverage
- Network: MTV
- Produced by: Alex Coletti; Salli Frattini; Dave Sirulnick
- Directed by: Beth McCarthy-Miller

The 2003 MTV Video Music Awards aired live on August 28, 2003, honoring the best music videos from June 1, 2002, to June 9, 2003. The show was hosted by Chris Rock at the Radio City Music Hall in New York City.

== Background ==
MTV announced on June 25 that the 2003 Video Music Awards would be held on August 28 at Radio City Music Hall and hosted by Chris Rock. Nominees were announced on July 24. The ceremony broadcast was preceded by the 2003 MTV Video Music Awards Opening Act. Hosted by Kurt Loder and SuChin Pak with reports from John Norris, Iann Robinson, Sway, and Gideon Yago, the broadcast featured red carpet interviews, pre-taped features on the career of Johnny Cash and a comparison between Eminem and 50 Cent, and performances from Sean Paul and Black Eyed Peas. The show also sparked controversy when Madonna kissed Britney Spears and Christina Aguilera.

This was the final year to present International Viewers' Choice Awards representing MTV's international affiliates.

== Performances ==
Artist(s)	Song(s)
Pre-show
Sean Paul	"Like Glue" "Get Busy" "Gimme the Light"
Black Eyed Peas	"Where Is the Love?"
Main show
Madonna; Britney Spears; Christina Aguilera; Missy Elliott	"Like a Virgin" (Spears and Aguilera only) "Hollywood" (Madonna, Spears and Aguilera only) "Work It"
Good Charlotte	"The Anthem"
Christina Aguilera; Redman; Dave Navarro	"Dirrty" (Aguilera and Redman) "Fighter" (Aguilera and Navarro)
50 Cent; Snoop Dogg	"P.I.M.P."
Mary J. Blige; Method Man; 50 Cent	"All I Need" (Blige only) "Love @ 1st Sight" (Blige and Method Man) "Ooh!" (Blige and 50 Cent) "Family Affair" (Blige only)
Coldplay	"The Scientist"
Beyoncé; Jay-Z	"Baby Boy" (Beyoncé only) "Crazy in Love"
Metallica	VMA 20th Anniversary Medley: "Are You Gonna Go My Way"; "Smells Like Teen Spirit"; "Seven Nation Army"; "Beat It"; "Frantic"

== Presenters ==
=== Pre-show ===
- Kurt Loder and SuChin Pak – announced the winners of the professional categories
- Carmen Electra, Dave Navarro and Iann Robinson – presented Breakthrough Video and Best Direction in a Video

=== Main show ===
- LeBron James and Ashanti – presented Best Hip-Hop Video
- Tony Hawk and Bam Margera – introduced Good Charlotte
- Kelly Clarkson and Ludacris – presented Best R&B Video
- Amy Lee, Ben Moody and Sean Paul – presented Best Video from a Film
- Crank Yankers – appeared in different vignettes presenting Viewer's Choice Award voting procedures
- Nelly and Murphy Lee – introduced Christina Aguilera
- OutKast and Iggy Pop – presented the MTV2 Award
- David Spade and Mary-Kate and Ashley Olsen – presented Best Pop Video
- P. Diddy – Paid tribute to Barry White, Gregory Hines, and Jam Master Jay; introduced Run-D.M.C. and presented Best Rap Video with them
- Hilary Duff, Lil Jon and Jason Biggs – presented Best Group Video
- Eminem and "Special Ed" (from Crank Yankers) – introduced 50 Cent
- Jimmy Fallon and the cast from Queer Eye for the Straight Guy – presented Best Female Video
- Fred Durst – introduced Jack Black and presented Best Rock Video with him
- DMX – introduced Mary J. Blige
- Kelly Osbourne and Avril Lavigne – presented the Lifetime Achievement Award to Duran Duran and presented Best Dance Video with them
- Justin Timberlake – introduced Coldplay
- Venus and Serena Williams – presented Best Male Video
- Mýa and Pamela Anderson – presented Best New Artist in a Video
- Pharrell and Chester Bennington – introduced Beyoncé
- Ben Stiller and Drew Barrymore – presented Viewer's Choice
- Adam Sandler and Snoop Dogg (with Bishop Don "Magic" Juan) – presented Video of the Year

== Winners and nominees ==
Nominees were selected by a group of approximately 5,000 viewers and members of the music industry. Winners in general and professional categories were selected by a group of 500 members of the music industry. Winners of the Viewer's Choice award and the MTV2 Award were selected by viewers. Voting for the MTV2 Award and Viewer's Choice award was conducted on MTV's website and, in the case of the latter award, through phone voting that continued through the ceremony broadcast.

Winners are in bold text.

Video of the Year	Best Male Video
**Missy Elliott – "Work It"**; 50 Cent – "In da Club"; Johnny Cash – "Hurt"; Eminem – "Lose Yourself"; Justin Timberlake – "Cry Me a River"	**Justin Timberlake – "Cry Me a River"**; 50 Cent – "In da Club"; Johnny Cash – "Hurt"; Eminem – "Lose Yourself"; John Mayer – "Your Body Is a Wonderland"
Best Female Video	Best Group Video
**Beyoncé (featuring Jay-Z) – "Crazy in Love"**; Christina Aguilera (featuring Redman) – "Dirrty"; Missy Elliott – "Work It"; Avril Lavigne – "I'm With You"; Jennifer Lopez – "I'm Glad"	**Coldplay – "The Scientist"**; B2K (featuring P. Diddy) – "Bump, Bump, Bump"; The Donnas – "Take It Off"; Good Charlotte – "Lifestyles of the Rich and Famous"; The White Stripes – "Seven Nation Army"
Best New Artist in a Video	Best Pop Video
**50 Cent – "In da Club"**; The All-American Rejects – "Swing, Swing"; Kelly Clarkson – "Miss Independent"; Evanescence (featuring Paul McCoy) – "Bring Me to Life"; Sean Paul – "Get Busy"; Simple Plan – "Addicted"	**Justin Timberlake – "Cry Me a River"**; Christina Aguilera (featuring Redman) – "Dirrty"; Kelly Clarkson – "Miss Independent"; Avril Lavigne – "Sk8er Boi"; No Doubt (featuring Lady Saw) – "Underneath It All"
Best Rock Video	Best R&B Video
**Linkin Park – "Somewhere I Belong"**; Evanescence (featuring Paul McCoy) – "Bring Me to Life"; Good Charlotte – "Lifestyles of the Rich and Famous"; Metallica – "St. Anger"; The White Stripes – "Seven Nation Army"	**Beyoncé (featuring Jay-Z) – "Crazy in Love"**; Aaliyah – "Miss You"; Ashanti – "Rock wit U (Awww Baby)"; R. Kelly – "Ignition (Remix)"; Nelly (featuring Kelly Rowland) – "Dilemma"
Best Rap Video	Best Hip-Hop Video
**50 Cent – "In da Club"**; 2Pac (featuring Nas) – "Thugz Mansion"; Eminem – "Lose Yourself"; Ludacris (featuring Mystikal) – "Move"; Nas – "I Can"	**Missy Elliott – "Work It"**; Busta Rhymes (featuring Mariah Carey) – "I Know What You Want"; Jay-Z (featuring Beyoncé) – "'03 Bonnie & Clyde"; Nelly – "Hot in Herre"; Snoop Dogg (featuring Pharrell and Uncle Charlie Wilson) – "Beautiful"
Best Dance Video	Best Video from a Film
**Justin Timberlake – "Rock Your Body"**; Christina Aguilera (featuring Redman) – "Dirrty"; Jennifer Lopez – "I'm Glad"; Mýa – "My Love Is Like...Wo"; Sean Paul – "Get Busy"	**Eminem – "Lose Yourself" (from 8 Mile)**; JC Chasez – "Blowin' Me Up (with Her Love)" (from Drumline); Madonna – "Die Another Day" (from Die Another Day); Britney Spears (featuring Pharrell) – "Boys (The Co-Ed Remix)" (from Austin Powers in Goldmember)
Breakthrough Video	Best Direction in a Video
**Coldplay – "The Scientist"**; Floetry – "Floetic"; Kenna – "Freetime"; Queens of the Stone Age – "Go with the Flow"; Sum 41 – "The Hell Song"	**Coldplay – "The Scientist" (Director: Jamie Thraves)**; Johnny Cash – "Hurt" (Director: Mark Romanek); Missy Elliott – "Work It" (Director: Dave Meyers and Missy Elliott); Sum 41 – "The Hell Song" (Director: Marc Klasfeld); Justin Timberlake – "Cry Me a River" (Director: Francis Lawrence)
Best Choreography in a Video	Best Special Effects in a Video
**Beyoncé (featuring Jay-Z) – "Crazy in Love" (Choreographers: Frank Gatson and LaVelle Smith Jr.)**; Christina Aguilera (featuring Redman) – "Dirrty" (Choreographer: Jeri Slaughter); Jennifer Lopez – "I'm Glad" (Choreographers: Jamie King and Jeffrey Hornaday); Mýa – "My Love Is Like...Wo" (Choreographer: Travis Payne); Justin Timberlake – "Rock Your Body" (Choreographer: Marty Kudelka)	**Queens of the Stone Age – "Go with the Flow" (Special Effects: Nigel Sarrag)**; Missy Elliott – "Work It" (Special Effects: Realm Productions); Floetry – "Floetic" (Special Effects: Base 2 Studios); Radiohead – "There There" (Special Effects: John Williams and Dave Lea); The White Stripes – "Seven Nation Army" (Special Effects: BUF)
Best Art Direction in a Video	Best Editing in a Video
**Radiohead – "There There" (Art Director: Chris Hopewell)**; Johnny Cash – "Hurt" (Art Director: Ruby Guidara); Missy Elliott – "Work It" (Art Director: Charles Infante); Jennifer Lopez – "I'm Glad" (Art Director: Chad Yaro); Queens of the Stone Age – "Go with the Flow" (Art Director: Tracey Gallacher)	**The White Stripes – "Seven Nation Army" (Editor: Olivier Gajan)**; Johnny Cash – "Hurt" (Editor: Robert Duffy); Missy Elliott – "Work It" (Editor: Chris Davis); Kenna – "Freetime" (Editors: Vem and Tony); Radiohead – "There There" (Editor: Ben Foley)
Best Cinematography in a Video	MTV2 Award
**Johnny Cash – "Hurt" (Director of Photography: Jean-Yves Escoffier)**; Missy Elliott – "Work It" (Director of Photography: Michael Bernard); No Doubt (featuring Lady Saw) – "Underneath It All" (Director of Photography: Karsten "Crash" Gopinath); Radiohead – "There There" (Director of Photography: Fred Reed)	**AFI – "Girl's Not Grey"**; Common (featuring Mary J. Blige) – "Come Close"; Interpol – "PDA"; Queens of the Stone Age – "No One Knows"; The Roots (featuring Cody Chesnutt) – "The Seed (2.0)"
Viewer's Choice	International Viewer's Choice: MTV Australia
**Good Charlotte – "Lifestyles of the Rich and Famous"**; 50 Cent – "In da Club"; Beyoncé (featuring Jay-Z) – "Crazy in Love"; Kelly Clarkson – "Miss Independent"; Eminem – "Lose Yourself"; Justin Timberlake – "Cry Me a River"	**Delta Goodrem – "Born to Try"**; Amiel – "Lovesong"; Powderfinger – "(Baby I've Got You) On My Mind"; Rogue Traders – "One of My Kind"; The Vines – "Outtathaway!"
International Viewer's Choice: MTV Brasil	
**Charlie Brown Jr. – "Papo Reto (Prazer É Sexo, o Resto É Negócio)"**; B5 – "Matemática"; Wanessa Camargo – "Sem Querer"; Capital Inicial – "Quatro Vezes Você"; CPM 22 – "Desconfio"; Detonautas Roque Clube – "Quando o Sol Se For"; Engenheiros do Hawaii – "Até o Fim"; Frejat – "Eu Preciso Te Tirar do Sério"; Jota Quest – "Só Hoje"; Kelly Key – "Adoleta"; Kid Abelha – "Nada Sei (Apnéia)"; KLB – "Por Causa de Você"; Marcelo D2 – "Qual É?"; Os Paralamas do Sucesso – "Cuide Bem do Seu Amor"; Pitty – "Máscara"; Rouge – "Brilha la Luna"; Sepultura – "Bullet the Blue Sky"; Skank – "Dois Rios"; Tihuana – "Bote Fé"; Titãs – "Isso"; Tribalistas – "Já Sei Namorar"
Lifetime Achievement Award
**Duran Duran**

== Artists with multiple wins and nominations ==
Artists who received multiple awards
Wins	Artist
3	Beyoncé
3	Coldplay
3	Justin Timberlake
2	50 Cent
2	Missy Elliott

Artists who received multiple nominations
Nominations	Artist
8	Missy Elliott
7	Justin Timberlake
6	Johnny Cash
5	50 Cent
5	Eminem
4	Beyoncé
4	Christina Aguilera
4	Jennifer Lopez
4	Queens of the Stone Age
4	Radiohead
4	The White Stripes
3	Coldplay
3	Good Charlotte
3	Kelly Clarkson
2	Avril Lavigne
2	Evanescence
2	Floetry
2	Kenna
2	Mýa
2	Nelly
2	No Doubt
2	Sean Paul
2	Sum 41

== Music Videos with multiple wins and nominations ==
Music Videos that received multiple awards
Wins	Artist	Music Video
3	Beyoncé (featuring Jay-Z)	"Crazy in Love"
3	Coldplay	"The Scientist"
2	50 Cent	"In da Club"
2	Justin Timberlake	"Cry Me a River"
2	Missy Elliott	"Work It"

Music Videos that received multiple nominations
Nominations	Artist	Music Video
8	Missy Elliott	"Work It"
6	Johnny Cash	"Hurt"
5	50 Cent	"In da Club"
5	Eminem	"Lose Yourself"
5	Justin Timberlake	"Cry Me a River"
4	Beyoncé (featuring Jay-Z)	"Crazy in Love"
4	Christina Aguilera (featuring Redman)	"Dirrty"
4	Jennifer Lopez	"I'm Glad"
4	Radiohead	"There There"
4	The White Stripes	"Seven Nation Army"
3	Coldplay	"The Scientist"
3	Good Charlotte	"Lifestyles of the Rich and Famous"
3	Kelly Clarkson	"Miss Independent"
3	Queens of the Stone Age	"Go with the Flow"
2	Evanescence (featuring Paul McCoy)	"Bring Me to Life"
2	Floetry	"Floetic"
2	Justin Timberlake	"Rock Your Body"
2	Kenna	"Freetime"
2	Mýa	"My Love Is Like...Wo"
2	No Doubt (featuring Lady Saw)	"Underneath It All"
2	Sean Paul	"Get Busy"
2	Sum 41	"The Hell Song"

== See also ==
- 2003 MTV Europe Music Awards
