= The Floacist =

English singer and spoken word artist

Natalie Stewart
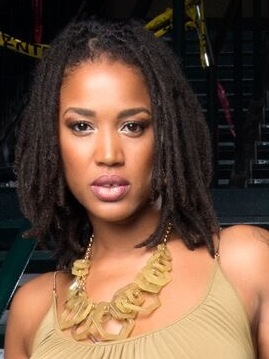
- Stewart in 2016

Background information
- Also known as: The Floacist, FLO
- Born: Natalie Stewart; 13 February 1979 (age 47); Germany
- Origin: South London, England
- Genres: R&B; soul; spoken word; neo soul
- Occupations: Spoken word artist; singer; songwriter; performance poet; music producer
- Instrument: Vocals
- Years active: 1997–present
- Labels: Shanachie; DreamWorks; Geffen
- Formerly of: Floetry
- Website: www.flovortex.com

Natalie Stewart (born 13 February 1979), better known as The Floacist, is a British spoken word artist, singer, songwriter, and performance poet.

In 1997, Stewart formed a music duo called Floetry. They released their debut album Floetic (2002) on DreamWorks Records. The album received a gold certification by the Recording Industry Association of America (RIAA). Floetic was succeeded by a live album titled Floacism "Live" in 2003. After the release of Floetry's second studio album, Flo'Ology (2005), the duo disbanded in 2006. In 2010, Stewart signed a record deal with Shanachie Records and released her debut solo album, titled Floetic Soul. She release two more albums on Shanachie: Floetry Re:Birth (2012) and Rise of the Phoenix Mermaid (2014).

As of 2016, Stewart has sold over two million records worldwide. She has earned three Soul Train Lady of Soul Awards, six Grammy Award nominations, two MOBO Award nominations, and three Soul Train Music Award nominations.

== Early life ==
Natalie Stewart is the daughter of Jamaican immigrants. With her father in the British Armed Forces, she was born in Germany, the youngest of three children, and started school in Hong Kong. After her father left the army, the family settled in London. She attended the BRIT School for Performing Arts and Technology. She later attended Middlesex University but transferred to the University of North London.

== Career ==
=== 1994–1999: Career beginnings and 3 Plus 1 ===
During her enrollment in North London University, Natalie Stewart formed a poetry group called 3 Plus 1. The group began to dissolved due to internal conflicts. During one of the group's final performances was during spoken word event called Poets vs MCs whereas Stewart invited Marsha Ambrosius on stage to perform a song they wrote together called "Fantasize" in 1999. Following the positive feedback from the audience, Stewart and Ambrosius formed a music duo called Floetry. Stewart also adopted the stage name The Floacist.

=== 2000–2006: Floetry and career breakthrough ===
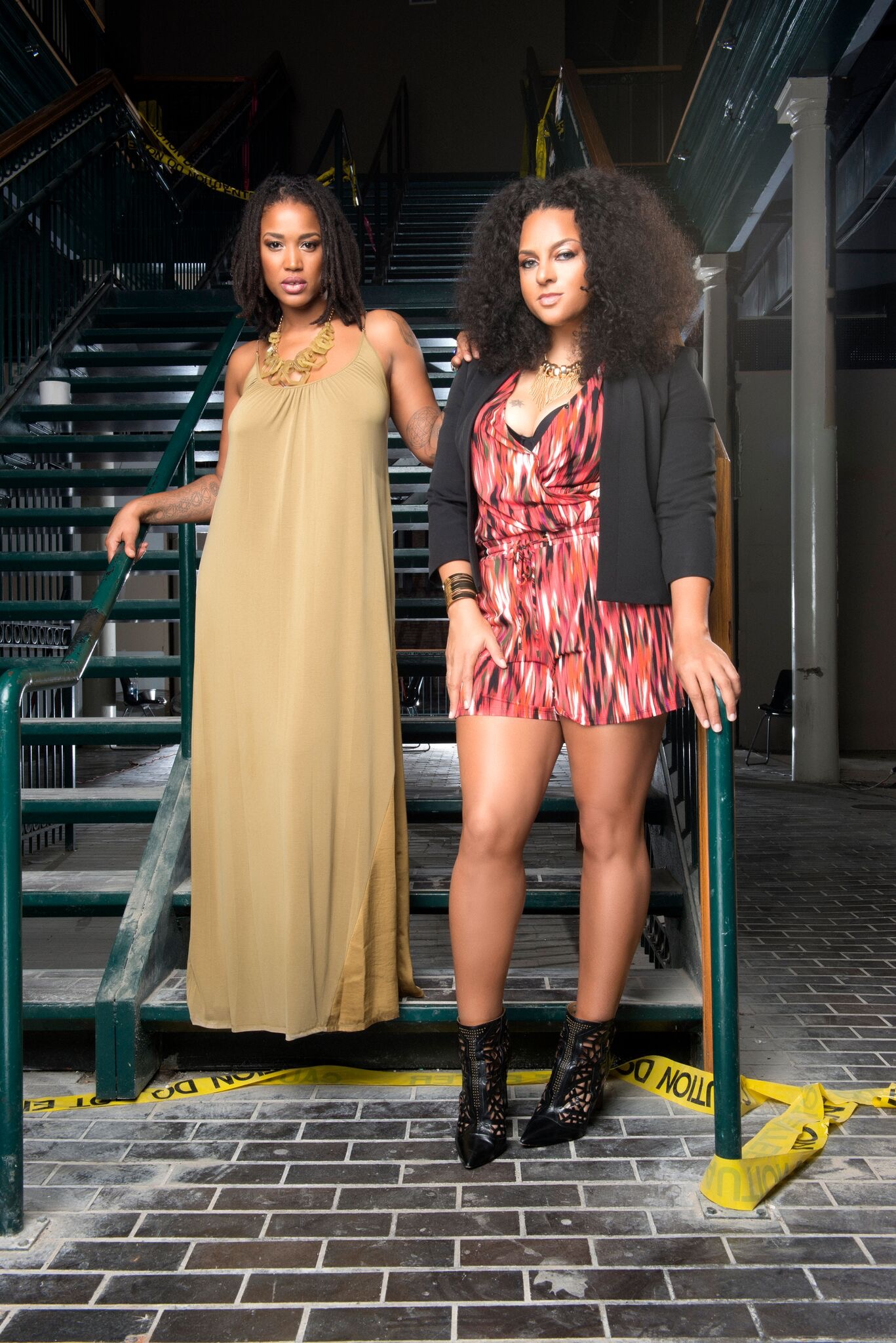
Floetry at February 2016 reunion. Stewart (left) and Marsha Ambrosius.

In 2000, Floetry relocated from London to the United States. After briefly staying Atlanta, they relocated to Philadelphia. Floetry eventually came under the management of Julius Erving III, which lead to them signing a recording contract with DreamWorks Records. Floetry released their debut album Floetic in October 2002. The album spawned the singles: "Floetic", "Say Yes", and "Getting Late". Their album received a gold certification by the Recording Industry Association of America (RIAA). They recorded a live album and concert film at the House of Blues in New Orleans on 3 July 2003. Floetry released their live album Floacism on 18 November 2003.

On 8 November 2005, they released their second album Flo'Ology. The album debuted at number seven on the Billboard 200 and number two on the US Top R&B/Hip-Hop Albums, selling over 77,000 copies in its first week. In August 2005, the album's lead single "SupaStar", which featured American rapper Common, peaked at number fifty-five on the US Hot R&B/Hip-Hop Songs chart. Its follow-up single "Lay Down" performed poorly and no music video was filmed for it. In late 2006, Floetry disbanded without making a formal announcement.

=== 2009–2014: Solo career and Shanachie Records ===
In January 2009, Stewart co-headlined a two-month concert tour with American hip hop duo Yo Majesty. In June 2010, Stewart released her extended play Spoken Soul Volume 1, followed by the release of a single titled "Prophecy". On 9 November 2010, she released her debut solo album Floetic Soul on Shanachie Records. The album peaked at number ninety-five on the Billboard 200 and number twenty on the Billboard Top R&B/Hip-Hop Albums chart. The album spawned the singles: "Forever", "Let Me", and "Keep It Going". She release her second album, Floetry Re:Birth, on 13 November 2012. Floetry Re:Birth peaked at number fifty on the US Top R&B/Hip-Hop Albums chart. The album's lead single, "Say Yes", was released as a celebration of tenth anniversary of Floetry as well as their single "Say Yes".

In March 2014, she released her third solo album, Rise of the Phoenix Mermaid. The album included the singles "Feel Good" and "On It".

=== 2015–2016: Floetry reunion ===
In February 2015, Stewart confirmed that Floetry had reunited and would be touring in 2015. On 16 May 2015, Floetry reunited and performed their first show in nine years at Pepsi Funk Festival in College Park, Georgia. Despite announcing they would be recording a new album, Floetry subsequently split after the second leg of their reunion tour in August 2016.

=== 2017–present: Good Life and i'N'i ===
In August 2017, Stewart released a single titled "Good Life". In November 2017, she headlined her first solo tour called the "Let It FLO Tour". In April 2025, she co-headlined the A Woman's Words Tour with English performer Queen Sheba. In June 2025, Stewart headlined the Live at City Winery Tour, her first solo American concert tour. On 31 July 2025, Stewart reunited with Marsha Ambrosius to perform as Floetry for three consecutive performances at the YS Firehouse in Yellow Springs, Ohio. In November 2025, Stewart and her husband Robbie Maddix formed a music duo called i'N'i. The duo released their debut single titled "We Be (i'N'i)" on November 7, 2025. In December 2025, the duo released their second single called "Do You Got Time".

== Business and ventures ==
=== Flo Spoken Word Vortex ===
On 24 November 2014, Stewart hosted the first Flo Spoken Word Vortex. The event gives spoken word artists and poetics a platform to perform at Hideaway Jazz & Comedy Club in Streatham, London. The FLO Spoken Word Vortex event occurs on the first and third Thursday of every month. In September 2019, the FLO Spoken Word Vortex was performed at Warmdaddy's in Philadelphia, Pennsylvania.

== Personal life ==
She was former married to English music producer Nolan Weekes. In 2017, Stewart began dating former Stone Roses drummer Robbie Maddix. In April 2025, Stewart revealed that she is a breast cancer survivor. In September 2025, Stewart married Robbie Maddix.

== Discography ==
=== Albums ===
List of albums, with selected details and chart positions
Title	Details	Peak chart positions		
Title	Details	US	US R&B/HH	US Indie
Floetic Soul	Released: 9 November 2010; Label: Shanachie; Formats: CD, digital download	95	20	7
Floetry Re:Birth	Released: 13 November 2012; Label: Shanachie; Formats: CD, digital download	—	51	—
Rise of the Phoenix Mermaid	Released: 18 March 2014; Label: Shanachie; Formats: CD, digital download	—	—	—
"—" denotes releases that did not chart

=== Extended plays ===
List of EPs, with selected details
Title	Details
Spoken Soul Volume I	Released: 18 June 2010; Formats: CD, digital download
Supernatural	Released: 6 March 2026; Formats: Digital download, streaming

=== Singles ===
List of singles
Title	Year	Album
"Prophecy"	2010	Non-album single
"Forever" (featuring Musiq Soulchild)	2010	Floetic Soul
"Let Me"	2011	Floetic Soul
"Keep It Going" (featuring Raheem DeVaughn)	2011	Floetic Soul
"Say Yes"	2012	Floetry Re:Birth
"Soul"	2012	Floetry Re:Birth
"Feel Good"	2014	Rise of the Phoenix Mermaid
"On It"	2015	Rise of the Phoenix Mermaid
"Good Life"	2017	Non-album single
"We Be (iNi)" (with i'N'i)	2025	Supernatural
"Do You Got Time" (with i'N'i featuring Guy Kelton Jones I)	2025	Supernatural
"Peace" (with i'N'i featuring Terri Walker)	2026	Supernatural

== Tours ==
Headlining

- Let It FLO Tour (2017)
- Flo Spoken Word Vortex Tour (2019)
- Live at City Winery Tour (2025)

Co-headlining

- The Floacist and Yo Majesty Tour (with Yo Majesty) (2009)
- A Woman's Words Tour (with Queen Sheba) (2025)

== Filmography ==
- 2004: One on One (as herself)
- 2008: Reasonable Excuse (as Laila)
- 2010: Remaindered (as the Background Performer)
- 2010: The Creepy Doll (as the Waiting Room Patient #2)
- 2012: Spirit Stalkers (as the Restaurant Patron)
