= Kent Masters King =

American actress (born 1974)

- Born: August 5, 1974 (age 51); Los Angeles, California, U.S.
- Occupation: Actress
- Years active: 1987–present

Kent Masters King (born August 5, 1974) is an American actress known for her appearances on the daytime soap opera General Hospital.

== Early life ==
Kent was born and raised in Los Angeles, California. Her father, Dr. Richard D. King, is an Egyptologist and her mother is a former actress. She studied filmmaking at the University of Southern California, where she majored in Cinema and Television and graduated in 1996.

== Career ==
Kent began her career as Julie Williams on the primetime soap opera Knots Landing (1988-1992). She filled in for Victoria Rowell in 2000 when Rowell took a hiatus from The Young and the Restless, then joined Port Charles briefly in 2003 as the mysterious and beautiful Imani. She began a recurring role as Dr. Lainey Winters on General Hospital on April 1, 2005, and was upgraded to contract status in December 2005. In 2007, King became an original cast member of the General Hospital prime-time spin-off General Hospital: Night Shift while maintaining her day job on GH. On June 1, 2008, King was taken off contract with General Hospital, and became a recurring cast member once again.

Kent is the daughter of Egyptologist and actress Alfreda Masters (who spent many years as an extra on General Hospital at the nurses' station), and was named for an Egyptian goddess.

== Filmography ==
=== Film ===
Year	Title	Role	Notes
1998	Johnny B Good	-	
2001	The Wash	Michelle	
2002	Love and a Bullet	Cynda Griffie	
2002	BraceFace Brandi	BraceFace Brandi	Short
2003	Malibooty	Tommi	Video
2004	The Hillside Strangler	Gabrielle	
2008	The Aphrikan	Anna	Short
2012	Y - The Last Man Rising	Agent 355	Short
2013	Aftermath	Liz Bricker	
2017	All About The Money	Chris's Wife	

=== Television ===
Year	Title	Role	Notes
1987	Hill Street Blues	Tracy Milton	Episode: "Days of Swine and Roses"
1988-92	Knots Landing	Julie Williams	Supporting cast: season 9-13
1992	The Fresh Prince of Bel-Air	Monique	Episode: "The Aunt Who Came to Dinner"
1994	Red Shoe Diaries	Emily	Episode: "Emily's Dance"
1998	The Wayans Bros.	Chrissy	Episode: "The Son of Marlon"
1998	The Jamie Foxx Show	Tonya	Episode: "Is There a Doctor in the House?"
1999	Smart Guy	Danita Mills	Episode: "I Was a Teenage Sports Wife"
1999	The Steve Harvey Show	Tessa	Episode: "He's Gotta Have It"
2000	The Parkers	Debbie	Episode: "Love Is a Royal Pain"
2000	The Young and the Restless	Drucilla Barber Winters	Regular Cast
2003	Port Charles	Imani	Episode: "Episode #1.1626"
2004	All of Us	Alanna	Episode: "Catering"
2005-10	General Hospital	Dr. Lainey Winters	Regular Cast
2007	General Hospital: Night Shift	Dr. Lainey Winters	Main cast: season 1
2014	Love Midori	Jessica	Episode: "Threesome"

=== Music video ===
Year	Artist	Song
2000	Jagged Edge	"Let’s Get Married"
2001	Glenn Lewis	"Don't You Forget It"
2002	Glenn Lewis	"It's Not Fair"
