= Back for More (Glenn Lewis song) =

Single by Glenn Lewis featuring Kardinal Offishall
- Released: September 30, 2003
- Recorded: 2003
- Genre: R&B, hip-hop
- Length: 3:54
- Label: Epic
- Songwriter(s): J. Harrow, A. Harris, V. Davis, J. Boyd, D. Rogers
- Producer(s): Dre & Vidal

Glenn Lewis singles chronology
"It's Not Fair" (2002)	"Back for More" (2003)	"Good One" (2010)

Kardinal Offishall singles chronology
"Empty Barrel" (2003)	"Back for More" (2003)	"Carnival Girl" (2003)

"Back for More" is an R&B/hip-hop song by Glenn Lewis featuring Kardinal Offishall. Produced by Dre & Vidal, the single was released on September 30, 2003. It was originally the first single from his unreleased album of the same name.

== Music video ==
The song's music video was shot in a Toronto nightclub. It features cameo appearances by Vince Carter and Mike Epps.

== Track listing ==
=== CD single ===
1. "Back for More" (Album Version)
2. "Back for More" (I-Soul Radio Remix)

== Chart positions ==
Chart (2004)	Peak position
U.S. Billboard Hot R&B/Hip-Hop Singles & Tracks	76
