= Bout Your Love =

Single by Glenn Lewis

from the album Rudimental 2k
- Released: 1998
- Genre: R&B
- Length: 3:53
- Label: Popular/EMI Canada
- Songwriter(s): G. Lewis
- Producer(s): 2Rude

Glenn Lewis singles chronology
"The Thing to Do" (1997)	"Bout Your Love" (1998)	"Don't You Forget It" (2001)

"Bout Your Love" is an R&B song by Glenn Lewis, released in 1998. Produced by 2Rude, the single and remix appear on 2Rude's 1999 album, Rudimental 2k. The song was nominated for Best R&B/Soul Recording at the 1999 Juno Awards.

== Music video ==
The song's music video was directed by Uuew T and Little X. About one minute into the video, the beat changes, and the song's remix plays until the end of the video. Model and actress Melyssa Ford appears in the video.
