= I Still Love You =

I Still Love You can refer to:

- "I Still Love You" (The Nobletones song), 1958
- "I Still Love You" (The Vejtables song), 1965
- "I Still Love You" (Bee Gees song), 1981
- "I Still Love You" (Lil Suzy song), 1998
- "I Still Love You" (702 song), 2003
- "I Still Love You" (Jennifer Hudson song), 2015
- "I Still Love You", a 1982 song from the Kiss album Creatures of the Night
- "I Still Love You", a 1997 song from the Next album Rated Next
- "Je ne sais pas pourquoi" (Kylie Minogue song), also known as "I Still Love You (Je ne sais pas pourquoi)"
- "I Still Love You", a music track from Doki Doki Literature Club.
- "I still love you", a lyric from the Queen songs "Love of My Life" and "These Are the Days of Our Lives"
- "Of Course I Still Love You", an autonomous spaceport drone ship by SpaceX
