= Beautiful Eyes (disambiguation) =

Beautiful Eyes is a 2008 EP by Taylor Swift, or its title track.

Beautiful Eyes may also refer to:

- "Beautiful Eyes", a song by Glenn Lewis from the album World Outside My Window, 2002
- "Beautiful Eyes", a song by the Naked Brothers Band from the album The Naked Brothers Band, 2007
- "Beautiful Eyes", a song by Hans Zimmer from the soundtrack album to Sherlock Holmes: A Game of Shadows, 2011
- "Beautiful Eyes", a 1949 song by Art Mooney
- "Beautiful Eyes", a 2012 song by Ripley
