= The Thing to Do =

The Thing to Do may refer to:

- "The Thing to Do" (song), a 1997 song by Glenn Lewis
- The Thing to Do (album), a 1965 album by Blue Mitchell
