= Floetry Re:Birth =

Studio album by The Floacist
- Released: November 13, 2012
- Recorded: 2012
- Genre: neo soul, spoken word
- Length: 36:42
- Label: Shanachie Entertainment
- Producer: Natalie Stewart, Nolan Weekes, Danny Weiss

The Floacist chronology
Floetic Soul (2010)	Floetry Re:Birth (2012)	Rise of the Phoenix Mermaid (2014)

Singles from Floetry Re:Birth
- 1. "Say Yes" Released: 22 August 2012

Floetry Re:Birth is the second studio album by English singer-songwriter and performance poet The Floacist. It was released on 13 November 2012, by Shanachie Records.

== Recording and production ==
The recording of the album began in early 2012. Stewart remarked that this was her first album with full creative control. She recorded the entire album in her own studio Free Sum Music Studios in the United Kingdom, while the songs were mixed and mastered at Bass Hit Studios in New York City. Stewart co-wrote all of the material on Floetry Re:Birth. The album saw the return of then-husband and music producer Nolan Weekes, who produced every song on the album. Michael "Remmi" Weekes also returned and co-produced "Speechless".

== Title and artwork ==
This year [2012] celebrates the 10 year anniversary of when we released the first Floetry album, our introduction to the world if you’d like. So this album is created as a means to celebrate the journey and some of the challenges that came and overcoming those challenges and moving forward strongly.

—The Floacist (YouKnowIGotSoul interview)

The album was titled Floetry Re:Birth to celebrate the tenth anniversary since the release of Floetic, the first album released by Floetry on 1 October 2002. In a radio interview with WBUR-FM, Stewart stated, "The album is really embracing and appreciating your past in order to, you know, strengthen your foundation in your present, in order to have a positive effect on your future."

The artwork for the physical edition is a close-up portrait of Stewart with heavy makeup and jewelry. The artwork for the digital version features Stewart in a makeup, being photograph from face to chest while the background is being outshined with a beam of light and album title. The cover artworks for the physical and digital editions of Floetry Re:Birth were all shot by English photographer Duncan Telford while the graphics were created by graphic artist Lorien Babajian.

== Release and promotion ==
On 22 August 2012, Stewart released "Say Yes" as the album's lead single. A music video was filmed and uploaded to Shanachie Entertainment's YouTube page. In September 2012, Stewart released a song titled "Soul". While the song lightly addresses a few misconceptions about the disbandment of Floetry, several media outlets interpreted the song as diss song to former Floetry member Marsha Ambrosius. In October 2012, she release the song "Start Again", which features American singer Raheem DeVaughn, to the website Okayplayer. Floetry Re:Birth was released by Shanachie Entertainment on 13 November 2012.

== Critical reception ==
Professional ratings
Review scores
Source	Rating
AllMusic	3.5/5 stars

AllMusic's Andy Kellman praised the album and stated, "Floetry Re:Birth trumps Stewart's previous album, Floetic Soul. The songs are sturdier, the grooves are more memorable, and there's less personal-growth fluff. As a singer, Stewart is more confident and capable." Enyi Emesih of Okayplayer referred to it as a "good album" with undeniable growth.

== Commercial performance ==
Floetry Re:Birth peaked at number fifty-one on the US Top R&B/Hip-Hop Albums chart.

== Track listing ==
Floetic Soul track listing
No.	Title	Writer(s)	Producer(s)	Length
1.	"Start Again" (featuring Raheem DeVaughn)	Natalie Stewart; Raheem DeVaughn; Eric Rousseau	Nolan Weekes	4:42
2.	"Children of the Sun"	Stewart; Demi Mseleku-Gibson	Weekes	3:56
3.	"Step Out"	Stewart	Weekes	3:20
4.	"Slow Down"	Stewart	Weekes	3:40
5.	"Soul"	Stewart	Weekes	2:55
6.	"Say Yes (10 Year Anniversary Edition)"	Marsha Ambrosius	Weekes	4:09
7.	"Could It be You?"	Stewart; Davis	Weekes	3:16
8.	"Speechless"	Stewart; Remi Weekes	N. Weekes; Remi Weekes	3:42
9.	"This Love"	Stewart; Hutson	Weekes	3:28
10.	"Roots of Love" (featuring Thandiswa Mazwai)	Stewart; Thandiswa Mazwai	Weekes	3:34
Total length:				36:42

== Credits ==
Adapted from the Floetry Re:Birth liner notes

Musicians

- Natalie Stewart – lead vocals, background vocals (all tracks)
- Alex Bennett – keyboards (all tracks)
- Michael Davis – bass trombone (track 10)
- Aleysha Gordon – background vocals (tracks 1, 2, 3, 4, 5, 6, 7, 8, 9)
- Celina Grant – background vocals (track 5)
- Keisha John – background vocals (track 5)
- Tony Kadleck – flugelhorn, trumpet (track 10)
- Hannah Khemoh – background vocals (track 6)
- Neville Malcolm – double bass (tracks 2, 4, 7, 10)
- David Mann – horn arrangements (tracks 1, 2, 10), alto flute (tracks 7, 8), clarinet (track 10), tenor saxophone (track 10)
- Antonia McNamee – background vocals (track 5)
- Perry Melius – drums (tracks 2, 8, 9, 10)
- Alan Weekes – guitar (tracks 1, 5, 6, 7, 8, 9)
- Nolan Weekes – double bass (track 3), drums (tracks 3, 7), string arrangements (track 8), background vocals (tracks 2, 6)
- Remi Weekes – bass (tracks 1, 9), drums (track 1), guitar (tracks 3, 4, 9)

Technical

- Dave Darlington – mixing and mastering
