= World Outside My Window =

Studio album by Glenn Lewis
- Released: March 19, 2002
- Length: 65:20
- Label: Epic
- Producer: Andre Harris & Vidal Davis

Singles from World Outside My Window
- 1. "Don't You Forget It" Released: November 6, 2001; 2. "It's Not Fair" Released: April 2, 2002

World Outside My Window is the debut album by Canadian singer Glenn Lewis. It was released by Epic Records on March 19, 2002. Chiefly produced by Dre & Vidal, the album featured two singles, "Don't You Forget It" and "It's Not Fair". It debuted at number four on the US Billboard 200, with 85,000 copies sold in the first week, and sold more than 377,000 copies in the United States.

== Critical reception ==
Professional ratings
Review scores
Source	Rating
AllMusic	3/5 stars
Blender	3/5 stars
Slant Magazine	3/5 stars
Rolling Stone	3.5/5 stars
USA Today	2.5/4 stars

Daryl Easlea from BBC Music called the album "polished, heartfelt collection of sincerely delivered R&B." Mark Anthony Neal, writing for Popmatters, found that "Lewis is a fine singer/songwriter whose debut recording is a fitting addition to the modern soul tradition." Blender critic Ryan Eliot found that World Outside My Window "mimics Wonder’s wistful balladry without disgracing it [...] Whether you’ll opt for this over, say, Innervisions is doubtful — despite the whiff of neosoul authenticity, Lewis is some distance from his hero’s masterly songwriting, with variety sacrificed for soporific grooves and a stolid, sleep-inducingly slow pace." Rolling Stone's Arion Berger wrote that "the music on this extraordinary debut is relaxed soul with a jazzy edge, and Lewis sports a high, vibrant voice with a slight thickness around the talky parts."

Slant Magazine's Sal Cinquemani noted that World Outside My Window was "plainly straight-up rhythm & blues. He's one part Gaye and two parts Wonder, drawing on the sounds of the past to craft a winning formula that earnestly blends soul with sincerity. That said, the singer will likely need to overcome comparisons to Wonder before reaching the heights of fellow crooner D'Angelo." AllMusic editor William Ruhlmann felt that Lewis "distinguishes himself [...] enough to be interesting on his own, but one spends most of the time spent listening to this album waiting for something to happen. Lewis' career has been well set up [but] he needs to get more substance into his songwriting and move beyond the influence of his hero."

== Commercial performance ==
World Outside My Window debuted at number 4 on the US Billboard 200 with 85,000 copies sold in the first week. By December 2013, it had sold 377,000 copies in the United States.

== Track listing ==
All lyrics are written by Glenn Lewis, Andre Harris and Vidal Davis, except as noted.

World Outside My Window track listing
No.	Title	Length
1.	"Simple Things" (Lewis, Harris, Davis, Marsha Ambrosius)	4:38
2.	"Beautiful Eyes" (Lewis, Harris, Davis, Ambrosius)	4:06
3.	"Don't You Forget It" (Lewis, Harris)	4:06
4.	"Something to See"	4:58
5.	"Lonely" (Harris, Davis, Ambrosius)	4:00
6.	"This Love" (Harris, Davis, Ambrosius)	4:28
7.	"One More Day"	3:26
8.	"Dream" (Lewis, Herschel Boone)	3:44
9.	"Is It True" (Lewis, Marc Byers, Harris, Davis)	3:34
10.	"Never Too Late"	4:10
11.	"Take Me"	4:43
12.	"Sorry" (Lewis, Davis)	4:54
13.	"Take You High" (Ambrosius, Harris, Davis)	4:12
14.	"It's Not Fair"	5:00
15.	"Your Song (For You)" (Lewis, Davis)	5:17
Total length:		65:20

== Personnel ==
Adapted from the World Outside My Window liner notes.

- Chris Garringer – Mastering (Sterling Sound)
- Mark Byers and Sherman Byers – Executive producers and A&R direction (Rockstar Entertainment)
- Andre Harris and Vidal Davis – Associate executive producers
- David McPherson – A&R direction
- Amberdawn Mickle – Product manager (Epic)
- Verna M. Miles – A&R manager (Epic)
- Julian Alexander – Art direction
- Danny Clinch – Photography
- Kithe Brewster – Styling

== Charts ==
=== Weekly charts ===
Weekly chart performance for World Outside My Window
Chart (2002)	Peak position
UK R&B Albums (OCC)	36
US Billboard 200	4
US Top R&B/Hip-Hop Albums (Billboard)	2

=== Year-end charts ===
Year-end chart performance for World Outside My Window
Chart (2002)	Position
Canadian R&B Albums (Nielsen SoundScan)	62
US Top R&B/Hip-Hop Albums (Billboard)	68
