= GROOVEssentials Volume One =

Compilation album by Various artists
- Released: 1997
- Genre: R&B
- Length: 65:36
- Label: Beat Factory/BMG Canada

Various artists chronology
GROOVEssentials Volume One (1997)	GROOVEssentials Volume Two (1998)

GROOVEssentials Volume One is a Canadian R&B compilation album, released in 1997 on Beat Factory Music, and distributed by BMG Music Canada. Three songs from the album—"The Thing to Do" by Glenn Lewis, "Don't Leave Me Hangin" by Camille Douglas, and "How May I Do U" by Unique, were nominated for Best R&B/Soul Recording at the 1998 Juno Awards, while the song "I Just Want To Be Your Everything" by The McAuley Boys was released on the 1997 Juno Awards nominated album In Another Lifetime in the same category.

== Track listing ==
#	Title	Performer(s)	Length
1.	"The Thing to Do"	Glenn Lewis	4:57
2.	"Rock with You"	Mischke	4:49
3.	"Make Me Feel"	Jamie Sparks	4:39
4.	"Nasty"	Daryl West	4:07
5.	"Baby C'mon (MF Club Mix)"	Carlos Morgan	4:34
6.	"How May I Do U"	Unique	5:14
7.	"I Just Want to Be Your Everything"	The McAuley Boys	4:40
8.	"Tonight"	Denosh	4:12
9.	"Give Me the Chance"	Wade O. Brown	5:36
10.	"The Feelin'"	Just	3:15
11.	"Forever Indebted"	Kuya	5:06
12.	"Don't Leave Me Hangin'"	Camille Douglas	4:24
13.	"To tha Break a Dawn"	Levant's Crew	4:30
14.	"Rock with You (Da Sizzling Street Mix)"	Mischke	5:33
