= Melyssa Ford =

Canadian-American hip-hop model, actress, and television personality (born 1976)

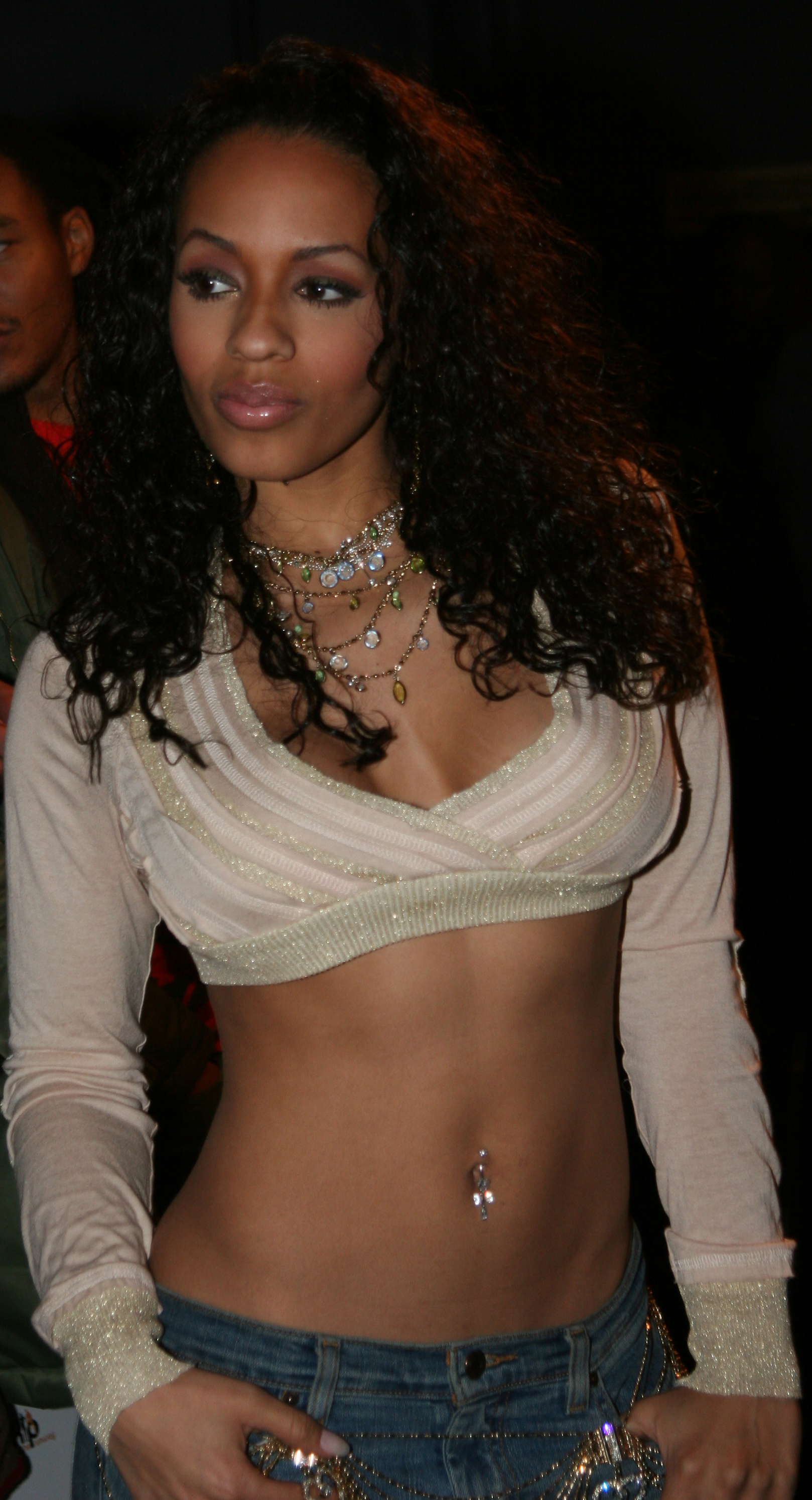
- Ford in March 2005
- Born: Melyssa Savannah Ford; November 7, 1976 (age 50); Toronto, Ontario, Canada
- Occupations: Media personality; actress; video vixen
- Years active: 1997–present
- Modeling information
- Height: 5 ft 4 in (1.63 m)
- Hair color: Brown
- Eye color: Light brown
- Website: www.melyssaford.com

Melyssa Savannah Ford (born November 7, 1976) is a Canadian media personality, actress, and former video vixen.

== Early life ==
Melyssa Savannah Ford was born on November 7, 1976, in Toronto, Ontario. Ford is mixed race, with her father having roots in Barbados, and her mother having Norwegian and Russian ancestry.

She attended York University, majoring in the field of forensic psychology.

== Career ==
In 1997, music video director Little X discovered Ford, who was 20, while she was working as a bartender at a Toronto nightclub and helped launch her modelling career. She has appeared in music videos, men's magazines, television programs and films. Ford was an on-air personality for Sirius Satellite Radio's Hot Jamz channel. She formerly sold a line of calendars and a DVD.

In a 2008 CNN interview, Ford explained that when making music videos she often asked herself whether she was "perpetuating a negative stereotype" about black women. When she was asked whether music videos, overall, are "demeaning to women", Ford replied, "Yes, I definitely have to say that".

From June 2014 to January 2015, Ford participated in the Bravo Network television series Blood, Sweat & Heels, documenting her social life against the background of her struggles of becoming a realtor in New York.

In 2016, Ford became a co-host of Hollywood Unlocked, a Los Angeles-based hip-hop and pop culture radio show. Ford returned to the show in April 2019 following her car accident in June 2018. In November 2019, Ford launched a podcast on YouTube called I'm Here for the Food. The podcast featured a host of guests and covered a range of topics, including colourism, human trafficking, and forgiveness. The podcast last aired in November 2020. On August 24, 2020, Ford announced she would no longer be co-hosting Hollywood Unlocked.

In 2022, after several years in Los Angeles, Ford moved back to the New York metropolitan area, and from December 2022 to September 2025, she co-hosted The Joe Budden Podcast alongside broadcaster and former rapper Joe Budden. On November 1, 2024, Ford premiered a new podcast called Hot and Bothered with Melyssa Ford focused on wellness and lifestyle practices for women over 40.

In 2025, Ford was mentioned in the song 'Gimme a Hug' by Drake, featured on his album Some Sexy Songs 4 U.

== Personal life ==
In June 2018, Ford was seriously injured in a car crash involving an 18-wheeler truck. She suffered a skull fracture and concussion.

== Filmography ==
=== Film ===
Year	Title	Role	Notes
2000	Turn It Up	Deborah	
2004	Psyche	Kenya	Short film
2007	God's Prayer	Dr. Jasmine Gray	
2007	Three Can Play That Game	Candy	
2008	Love for Sale	Katherine	
2008	Days of Wrath	Lisa	
2011	The Slap	Puma	Short film
2011	Video Girl	Lala	
2012	Think like a Man	Sleepy Girl	
2012	Redemption of a Dog	Sheila	
2013	Playin' for Love	Bella	
2018	The Stuff	Denise Washington	
2023	Sworn Justice: Taken Before Christmas	Letitia	TV movie
2024	Hunting Housewives	Sharell Bouvier	TV movie

=== Television ===
Year	Title	Role	Notes
2000	Soul Food	Hoochie Mama	2 episodes
2003	Platinum	Grady's Love Interest	4 episodes
BET Style	Herself/Host	Main Host	
2005	VH1 News Presents	Herself	Episode: "Hip Hop Videos: Sexploitation on the Set"
2007	Entourage	Flight Attendant	Episode: "No Cannes Do"
2008	The Black Poker Stars Invitational	Herself	Main Guest
2009	Played by Fame	Herself	Episode: "Sexy, Sensual and Stalker"
2014–2015	Blood, Sweat & Heels	Herself	Main cast
2018	Vixen	Herself	Main Guest
2019	Love & Hip Hop: Hollywood	Herself	Episode: "Pretty Petty" & "Sound Off"
2020–2021	Tough Love: Los Angeles	Dena Howard	Recurring cast

=== Documentary ===
Year	Title	Notes
2009	Good Hair	
2011	Bowl of Dreams	

=== Music videos ===
Year	Song	Artist
1997	"The Thing to Do"	Glenn Lewis
1998	"Anywhere"	112 featuring Lil' Zane
1998	"Northern Touch"	Rascalz featuring Checkmate, Kardinal Offishall, Thrust, and Choclair
1998	"Tommy's Theme"	Made Men featuring The LOX
1999	"Let's Ride"	Choclair
1999	"This Luv"	Donell Jones
2000	"Big Pimpin'"	Jay-Z featuring UGK
2000	"Thong Song Remix"	Sisqó
2000	"Cherchez LaGhost"	Ghostface Killah featuring U-God
2000	"Shake Ya Ass"	Mystikal
2001	"Knock Yourself Out"	Jadakiss
2003	"You Don't Know My Name"	Alicia Keys
2004	"Happy People"	R. Kelly
2004	"Yeah!"	Usher featuring Lil Jon and Ludacris

=== Video games ===
Year	Title	Role	Notes
2007	Def Jam: Icon	Herself	Voice role and likeness

== See also ==
- Hip hop models
