= Bringing Down the House (soundtrack) =

Soundtrack album by Various artists
- Released: March 4, 2003
- Recorded: 2002–2003
- Genres: Hip hop; R&B
- Length: 51:43
- Label: Hollywood
- Producers: Mitchell Leib (exec.); Queen Latifah (exec.); Shakim Compere (exec.); Rick "Dutch" Cousin; The Bishop; Anthony President; Brainz Dimilo; DR Period; Jelly Roll; Just Blaze; Mario Winans; Swinga; The Neptunes

Professional ratings
Review scores
Source	Rating
AllMusic	3.5/5 stars

Bringing Down the House is the soundtrack to Adam Shankman's 2003 comedy film Bringing Down the House. It was released on March 4, 2003 through Hollywood Records and mainly consisted of hip hop music. The soundtrack made it to 111 on the Billboard 200, 23 on the Top R&B/Hip-Hop Albums and 7 on the Top Soundtracks in the United States.

The only single released from the soundtrack was "Better Than the Rest" by the film's star Queen Latifah.

== Track listing ==
No.	Title	Producer(s)	Length
1.	"Let Go (Hit the Dance Floor)" (performed by Eve and Jadakiss)	Just Blaze	3:46
2.	"Whatcha Gonna Do" (performed by Foxy Brown)	Jelly Roll	3:47
3.	"Better Than the Rest" (performed by Queen Latifah)	DR Period	3:31
4.	"Where's the Love" (performed by Floetry)	The Bishop	4:45
5.	"Ain't Nobody" (performed by Kelly Price)	Rick "Dutch" Cousin	4:30
6.	"Move Somethin" (performed by Mr. Cheeks)	Anthony President; Brainz Dimilo	3:56
7.	"Let Me See You Dance" (performed by Yung Berg)	The Bishop	3:33
8.	"Way of Life" (performed by Lil' Wayne, Big Tymers and TQ)	Mannie Fresh	4:03
9.	"Do Your Thing" (performed by Queen Latifah and Mario Winans)	Mario Winans	3:52
10.	"Gutta" (performed by The Unit)	Swinga	3:40
11.	"Rock Star" (performed by N.E.R.D)	The Neptunes	4:31
12.	"Next to You" (performed by Calvin Richardson)	Rick "Dutch" Cousin	3:47
13.	"I'm Gonna Love You Just a Little More Baby" (performed by Barry White)	Barry White	4:02
14.	"Simply Irresistible" (performed by Robert Palmer)	Robert Palmer	4:28

Sample credits

- Track 1 contains a sample of "Before I Let Go" by Frankie Beverly & Maze
- Track 8 contains a sample of "Don't Look Any Further" by Dennis Edwards

== Charts ==
Chart (2003)	Peak position
US Billboard 200	111
US Top R&B/Hip-Hop Albums (Billboard)	23
US Top Soundtracks (Billboard)	7
