= The McAuley Boys =

Canadian R&B vocal quartet

- Also known as: McAuley
- Origin: London, Ontario, Canada
- Genres: Pop, R&B
- Years active: 1995–present
- Labels: 80/20 Records; Popular Records LLC; Aquarius Records/EMI
- Members: Gary McAuley; George McAuley; Mark McAuley; Randy McAuley

The McAuley Boys are an R&B vocal quartet based in London, Ontario, Canada. The members include brothers Ronald (Gary) McAuley, George McAuley, Mark McAuley, and Randal (Randy) McAuley. They are most notable for their 1997 Juno Award nomination for Best R&B/Soul Recording, having their cover of the Andy Gibb song "I Just Want To Be Your Everything" released on BMG Music Canada's Beat Factory Music GROOVEssentials Volume One, and performing the Canadian National Anthem "O Canada" at the 1997 Major League Baseball All-Star Game. They cite The Jackson 5 as being their main influence.

== The early years ==
The brothers were born to Rita and Winston McAuley, a schoolteacher and social worker respectively, who immigrated to Canada from their native Grenada where both parents performed music professionally. Rita McAuley sang with her sisters as The Mark Sisters.

In 1992, while attending the University of Western Ontario (UWO) in London, Ontario, Gary McAuley began songwriting with a then-unknown Stephan Moccio. In an interview with Billboard magazine, Moccio states that the pair had written a song for Celine Dion, which they used as an introduction to Dion and her husband/manager René Angélil during a visit to the campus. In the same interview, Moccio states that throughout his four years at UWO, he and Gary McAuley would play jazz and R&B in local clubs around London. In a 2016 interview with Shad on CBC Radio One's Q, Moccio said the song "How Do I Win Your Heart" (co-written with Gary) earned praise from David Foster after they sent him a demo on cassette. The multi-platinum producer praised their strong songwriting skills, saying "You have the talent to go all the way." For Gary, this led to a brief mentorship session in L.A. with Foster.

The McAuley Boys' first album, Wonderful Christmas Time, was self-released and entirely financed by their mother for Christmas 1995 using her own $13,000. The group credits the demand for the disc, which promptly recouped Rita's investment, as the catalyst for their professional approach to music.

Victor (Vic) Sinclair, then music director for CFPL in London, recognized the brothers' potential and left his tenured position at one of Canada's largest radio stations to manage the group, founding 80/20 Records and 80/20 Management. It was on the fledgling 80/20 Records that the album In Another Lifetime got its release, distributed across Canada through a regional Canadian distributor, 'Nuff Entertainment, otherwise known primarily for importing music from the Caribbean islands into Canada.

The first song pushed to radio stations from In Another Lifetime was the dance-floor friendly "Down, Down, Down", which after some success was included in the compilation album All Stars Dance Hits 97 released by Warner Music Canada-owned Popular Records. The momentum continued when their Juno Award nomination for Best R&B/Soul Recording was announced on January 29, 1997.

After the Juno Awards broadcast on March 9, 1997, the video for the single "Down, Down, Down" hit #10 on the MuchMusic Playlist for the week ending March 29, 1997, as reported by Billboard Magazine's "The Clip List".

Their appearance at the 1997 Major League Baseball All-Star Game was cut out of the live television broadcast by Fox Sports, which led to many irate phone calls to the press. Fox spokesman Lou D'Ermilio was quoted as saying "Due to time constraints, and since we're a U.S.-based broadcaster, the decision was made just to air the 'Star Spangled Banner'".

Their success was mentioned in a Billboard Magazine article about Carlos Morgan, the winner of the Juno Award in their category that year, along with Choclair and Denosh as "a significant sign of the growing force of Canadian R&B".

To end off 1997's eventful year, they played twice on The Pamela Wallin Show, once partnered with Canadian fiddle group Leahy on December 19, and again with Dayna Manning on December 24, as part of the show's Christmas music special: "Heavenly Duets".

On June 26, 1998, The McAuley Boys performed as part of the official launch to a $26-million entertainment expansion for the CN Tower in Toronto, Ontario.

The Fall 1998 issue of Jr. Jays magazine, a promotional product of the Toronto Blue Jays organization, gave away "a compact disc from The McAuley Boys" as part of their contest prizing.

== McAuley ==
In 1999, they signed with Aquarius Records, which meant distribution through EMI Music Canada, but also a group name change to the truncated "McAuley". After releasing the album My Heaven at the CNE Bandshell on September 1, 2000, opening for Eiffel 65, they joined Maestro on tour in support of his album Ever Since.

The video for the single "My Heaven" hit #5 on the MuchMusic Playlist for the week ending June 10, 2000, as reported by Billboard Magazine's "The Clip List".

The video for the single "By The Way" hit #7 on the MuchMusic Playlist for the week ending October 14, 2000, as reported by Billboard Magazine's "The Clip List". They remained in that spot the following week (October 21, 2000).

== Other projects ==
In 2002, Gary McAuley produced, arranged, and played multiple instruments on Jackie Ungar's album One Step. Mark McAuley is also credited as a vocalist. The record was executive produced by Gary McAuley and released on his label Yel Records/Yel Entertainment. One Step was nominated for "Contemporary/Pop Album Of The Year" at the 2003 Gospel Vibe Awards in Calgary, Alberta.

In 2007, Mark McAuley donned the stage name Mac Graham to release a solo EP "7 Grahams" and in 2010 an album entitled "Midnight".

Gary McAuley contributed to the 2007 album The Reason released by Urban X Entertainment artist Rufus.

== Members ==
- Gary McAuley - (Vocals, Producer)
- George McAuley - (Vocals)
- Mark McAuley - (Vocals)
- Randy McAuley - (Vocals)

== Studio albums ==
Year	Album	Label
1995	Wonderful Christmas Time	McMocMusic (Self-Released)
1996	In Another Lifetime	80/20 Records
1997	Wonderful Christmas Time	Popular Records LLC, a division of Warner Music Canada (Re-Release)
2000	My Heaven	Aquarius Records, distributed by Capitol-EMI

== Compilations ==
Year	Song Included	Album	Label
1997	"Down, Down, Down"	All Star Dance Hits 97	Popular Records LLC, a division of Warner Music Canada
1997	"I Just Want To Be Your Everything"	GROOVEssentials Volume One	Beat Factory/BMG Music Canada

== Singles ==
Year	Song	Canadian Video Peak	Album
1996	"Down, Down, Down"	10	In Another Lifetime
1997	"I Just Want To Be Your Everything"	-	In Another Lifetime
2000	"My Heaven"	5	My Heaven
2000	"By The Way"	7	My Heaven
