= Floacism "Live" =

Live album by Floetry
- Released: 18 November 2003
- Venue: House of Blues, New Orleans
- Genre: Neo soul; R&B; hip hop
- Length: 56:05
- Label: DreamWorks

Floetry chronology
Floetic (2002)	Floacism "Live" (2003)	Flo'Ology (2005)

Floacism "Live" is a live album by the R&B duo Floetry released in 2003. It also includes three studio songs.

== Critical reception ==
Professional ratings
Review scores
Source	Rating
AllMusic	2/5 stars

Andy Kellman of AllMusic wrote that the show is "best experienced visually, since the audio element can be a terror to listen to without the added dimension of the visuals" as watching it, one can be distracted from the fact "Floetry sound a lot better in studio form". Kellman also remarked that the "live arrangements are competent enough, but they're not all that exceptional, and they often seem to be present only for the sake of musicality (as in, 'See -- we write songs; we don't make tracks')." Kellman also felt that "Marsha Ambrosius is all over the place vocally, taking every possible opportunity to let some screeching, cracking melisma run wild. This takes away from the song in every case. And if it weren't for the track indexes on the CD, it would often be a challenge to determine where one song ends and where the next begins, given all the interludes, outerludes, redundant chit-chatter, and general noodling around."

== Track listing ==
1. "Wanna B Where U R (Thisizzaluvsong)" (featuring Mos Def) – 4:01
2. "Have Faith" – 4:11
3. "Tell Me When" – 4:14
4. "Big Ben" – 1:37
5. "Opera" – 4:30
6. "Sunshine (Intro)" – 1:15
7. "Sunshine" – 4:38
8. "If I Was a Bird" – 5:09
9. "Say Yes" (Intro) – 1:05
10. "Say Yes" – 5:57
11. "Getting Late" – 4:47
12. "Butterflies" – 4:29
13. "Floetic" – 4:20
14. "Hey You" – 5:52

== Charts ==
Chart performance for Floacism "Live"
Chart (2003)	Peak position
US Billboard 200	74
US Top R&B/Hip-Hop Albums (Billboard)	11
