= Star (702 album) =

Studio album by 702
- Released: March 25, 2003
- Genres: R&B; urban pop
- Length: 64:06
- Label: Motown
- Producers: Ted Bishop; Kevin "She'kspere" Briggs; Mike City; Charles Farrar; The Neptunes; Mario Winans; Jack Knight

702 chronology
| 702 (1999) | Star (2003) |

Singles from Star
- 1. "Star" Released: October 21, 2002; 2. "I Still Love You" Released: February 24, 2003

Star is the third and final studio album from American R&B group 702. It was originally scheduled to be released on November 19, 2002 by Motown, but was later delayed to March 25, 2003. In the United States. The album peaked at number forty-five on the US Billboard 200 and produced the singles “Star” and "I Still Love You".

== Critical reception ==
Professional ratings
Review scores
| Source | Rating |
|---|---|
| Allmusic | 2.5/5 stars |
| Blender | 2/5 stars |
| Slant Magazine | 3/5 stars |
| Vibe | 3.5/5 stars |

Andy Kellman of Allmusic rated the album two and a half stars out of five and gave the work a rather dismissive review, stating that "it continues in the group's tradition of being able to deliver a couple of solid singles surrounded by middling to fair album tracks." PopMatters thought the album was dated and "trapped in a time warp" and that "It wants to be pre-Mary J. Blige hip-hop and R&B with some notable exceptions". Overall, they praised both Mario Winans and the Neptunes contributions to the album, and felt they managed "to create some haphazard hits here, lack of creativity aside".

Sal Cinquemani from Slant Magazine was mixed in his review. Cinquemani praised the albums first half of material, while disapproving of the second half calling it "a bit less successful". Nonetheless, he declared, "702 comes closest to capturing the buttery warm harmonies of Diana Ross and the Supremes—Destiny’s Child be damned. Star exists to prove that surprises can indeed be pleasant". Vibe editor Craig Seymour called the album "a sassy throwback" and added: "Star might have been garbage, given that the group recently reformed after a three-year recording hiatus [but] it manages to be a rare, pleasant surprise in today’s R&B world. Blame much of the set’s success on the beats, which are as tight and lean as a Kenyan runner."

== Chart performance ==
The album peaked at forty-five on the US Billboard 200 and reached the twenty-second spot on the Top R&B/Hip-Hop Albums chart. The album sold 21,000 copies in its first week and a total of 100,000 copies.

== Track listing ==
Star track listing
| No. | Title | Writer(s) | Producer(s) | Length |
|---|---|---|---|---|
| 1. | "Let Your Hair Down" | Kevin "She'kspere" Briggs; LeMisha Grinstead; Irish Grinstead; Patrice Stewart; Kameelah Williams | She'kspere | 2:46 |
| 2. | "Star" (featuring Clipse) | Gene Thornton; Terrence Thornton; Pharrell Williams | The Neptunes | 4:04 |
| 3. | "Trouble" | Robert "Kool" Bell; Don Boyce; George Brown; Robert "Spike" Mickens; Claydes Charles Smith; Dennis Thomas; Richard Westfield; Mario Winans; Jack Knight | Winans | 3:29 |
| 4. | "Feelings" | Briggs; L. Grinstead; I. Grinstead; Stewart; K. Williams | She'kspere | 3:41 |
| 5. | "Come & Knock on My Door" | Briggs; Bunny DeBarge; El DeBarge; L. Grinstead; I. Grinstead; Stewart; K. Williams | She'kspere | 4:04 |
| 6. | "I Still Love You" | Chad Hugo; P. Williams | The Neptunes | 4:47 |
| 7. | "Reality" | Tony Cottrell; Talib Kweli Green; Anthony Walker; Winans | Winans | 2:29 |
| 8. | "Certified" | Warren Jones; Isaac Lewis; Levi Stephens; Lysette Titi | Kollective | 4:33 |
| 9. | "Places" | Jones; Lewis; Stephens; Titi | Kollective | 7:34 |
| 10. | "Stringing Me Along" | Michael Flowers | Mike City | 3:57 |
| 11. | "No Way" | Briggs; L. Grinstead; I. Grinstead; Stewart; K. Williams | She'kspere | 3:27 |
| 12. | "Blah Blah Blah Blah" | Kimberley Jackson-Jones; Jawan Jackson; LaVerne Jackson; Priscilla Latorrie Jackson; Dwight "Lil Skrapp" Reynolds | Reynolds | 3:15 |
| 13. | "Betcha She" | Johnta Austin; Teddy Bishop; Gregory Charley | Bishop | 3:32 |
| 14. | "Better Day (Ghetto Girl)" | Anthony Best; Faith Evans; L. Grinstead; I. Grinstead; Atiba Newsome; Josef Powell; Rasheem Pugh; Oren Walters; K. Williams | Buckwild; Evans^{[a]} | 3:59 |
| 15. | "Jealousy" | Flowers | City | 4:12 |
| 16. | "I'm Wit It" | Michael Ammen; Charles Farrar; Steve Russell | Farrar | 4:17 |
| Total length: | | | | 64:06 |

Notes

- ^{^[a]} denotes co-producer

Sample credits

- "Trouble" contains excerpts from the compostition "Jungle Boogie" as performed by Kool & The Gang.
- "Come & Knock on My Door" contains an interpolation of "I Like I" as performed by DeBarge.
- "Reality" contains a sample of "Too Late" as performed by Talib Kweli and Hi-Tek.
- "Better Day (Ghetto Girl)" contains a sample from "Could It Be Magic" as performed by The Waters.

== Personnel ==
Information taken from Allmusic.

- a&r – Nina Freeman, Kedar Massenburg, Shante Paige, Marsha Reid
- arranging – Ted Bishop
- art direction – Chris Kornmann
- assistant – Vincent Alexander, Mike Butler, Vadim Chislov, Stephen Glicken, Dion Peters, Alexis Seton, Rich Tapper, Javier Valverde, Jeff Vereb, Artese Williams
- composing – R. Bell, G. Brown, J.J. Jackson, L. Jackson, P.J. Jackson, E. Jordan, S.K. Russell, Mario Winans
- creative direction – Sandy Brummels
- design – Chris Kornmann
- drums – Pharrell Williams
- engineering – Wayne Allison, Ted Bishop, Ben Briggs, Dru Castro, Andrew Coleman, Larry Ferguson, Eliud "Lou" Ortiz, Hernán Santiago, Mike Tocci, Darren Venbitti
- executive production – Kedar Massenburg, Shante Paige, Todd Russaw
- guitar – Greg Charley
- instrumentation – Charles Farrar
- keyboards – Ted Bishop, Dave Hunter, Tevin Thomas
- mastering – Chris Gehringer
- mixing – Ben Arrindell, Kevin "KD" Davis, Duro, Larry Ferguson, Rich Keller, Phil Tan
- photography – Albert Sanchez
- production – Ted Bishop, Mike City, Charles Farrar, Mario Winans
- programming – Ted Bishop, Charles Farrar, Pharrell Williams
- rapping – Clipse
- vocals – 702, Pharrell Williams

== Charts ==
| Chart (2003) | Peak position |
|---|---|
| US Billboard 200 (Billboard) | 45 |
| US Top R&B/Hip-Hop Albums (Billboard) | 22 |
