= War with God =

"War With God"

Song by Ludacris

from the album Release Therapy
- Genre: Gangsta rap
- Length: 4:30
- Label: Island
- Songwriter(s): Christopher Bridges, Andre Harris, Vidal Davis, Alexander Chiger, Harry Zelnick, Leon Huff, Kenny Gamble
- Producer(s): Dre & Vidal

"War with God" is a song on the album Release Therapy by rapper Ludacris. Released in July 2006, the song saw Ludacris return to music after some time off to concentrate on his acting career.

== Synopsis ==
In the track, Ludacris goes on the offensive against an unknown rapper who has sold drugs, makes repeated references to firing guns in his songs, isn't as rich as Ludacris, and likes to give himself titles; these allegations are directed toward T.I.

T.I. responds to this song on the remix of "Umma Do Me" by Rocko saying:

Money you say u get 30 mil. in six years
Listen, Forbes put me down fa 20, dat was dis year
And let's get dis clear just between you and me
Dat apology was for B.E.T not D.T.P

Ludacris has stated that the song was deeper than just a diss, and the song is more about him than anyone else, it's showing that he isn't just the 'cartoon entertainer' type rapper that he has been portrayed as. When asked about who specific rhymes were aimed at, he said "The guilty will speak".

Later, in SOHH.com's Pre VMA Interview, Ludacris was asked if the song was self-referential. Ludacris replied, "Man, somebody misquoted me talking about...they misquoted me saying it was about me. What I was telling them was that I devote a lot of information about myself, and I think they're taking that in. I'm not battling myself on the record, that's ridiculous. What happens is you got a lot of people taking subliminal shots, but nobody ever says my name. I'm not for sure, so that record is like my way of taking subliminal shots right back. Don't get it misquoted, don't get it messed up. That's basically what it is man. It's like, you know, like I said I do devote a lot of information about myself on there. I started to wreck it up by saying I'm the best, and there's nothing you could do about it. [They say] I've never done this I've never done that, so you know when you look into it, it's a lot more records where it comes from on the album, September 26, Release Therapy, where it's the most personal album I've done. It's nothing but honesty so you can criticize it all you want to but at the end of the day you got to respect it cause I'm coming straight from the heart. [I'm] just telling the truth, [and] that's all you gotta know."

== Credits and personnel ==
Recording

- Recorded at: The Ludaplex in Atlanta, Georgia.

Personnel

- Ludacris – vocals, songwriting
- Dre & Vidal – producers, songwriting
- Don Cheegro – co-producer
- Alexander Chiger – songwriting
- Harry "Dirty Harry" Zelnick – songwriting, co-producer
- Joshua Monroy – recording
- Leon Huff – songwriting
- Kenny Gamble – songwriting
- Vincent Dilorenzo – mixing
- Phil Tan – mixing
- Michael Tsarfati – recording, assistant mixer
- Bernie Grundman – mastering

Samples

- Contains an excerpt of "War of the Gods", performed by Billy Paul and written by Leon Huff and Kenny Gamble.
