= The Thing to Do (song) =

Single by Glenn Lewis

from the album GROOVEssentials Volume One
- Released: 1997
- Genre: R&B
- Length: 4:57
- Label: Beat Factory/BMG Canada
- Songwriter: G. Lewis
- Producer: Glenn Lewis

Glenn Lewis singles chronology
"The Thing to Do" (1997)	"Bout Your Love" (1998)

"The Thing to Do" is an R&B song by Glenn Lewis, released as his debut single in 1997, from the GROOVEssentials Volume One compilation album. The song was nominated for Best R&B/Soul Recording at the 1998 Juno Awards. The song's music video features an appearance by a young Melyssa Ford.
