= Don't You Forget It =

Single by Glenn Lewis

from the album World Outside My Window
- Released: November 6, 2001
- Recorded: July 2001
- Genre: R&B, neo soul
- Length: 4:12
- Label: Epic
- Songwriters: G. Lewis, A. Harris
- Producer: Andre Harris

Glenn Lewis singles chronology
"Bout Your Love" (1998)	"Don't You Forget It" (2001)	"It's Not Fair" (2002)

"Don't You Forget It" is an R&B song by Glenn Lewis, released in November 2001. Produced by Andre Harris, it was the first single from his debut album, World Outside My Window. In early 2002, the song became popular after its music video was released. The song, known for its strong Stevie Wonder influence, won the award for Best R&B/Soul Recording at the 2002 Juno Awards.

== Music video ==
The song's music video was directed by Chris Robinson. It features Lewis singing in a room, surrounded by vinyl records of R&B/soul singers of the past. Actress Kent King plays his love interest in the video.

== Track listing ==
=== 12" single ===
A-side

1. "Don't You Forget It" (Main)
2. "Don't You Forget It" (Instrumental)

B-side

1. "Don't You Forget It" (TV track)
2. "Don't You Forget It" (A Cappella)

=== CD single ===
1. "Don't You Forget It" (Album Version)
2. "Don't You Forget It" (DJ Clue Dirty Mix) (featuring Paul Cain)
3. "Don't You Forget It" (Nazkar Remix)
4. "Don't You Forget It" (Video Version)

== Charts ==
=== Weekly charts ===
Weekly chart performance for "Don't You Forget It"
Chart (2001–2002)	Peak position
US Billboard Hot 100	30
US Hot R&B/Hip-Hop Songs (Billboard)	10
US Rhythmic Airplay (Billboard)	20

=== Year-end charts ===
Year-end chart performance for "Don't You Forget It"
Chart (2002)	Position
Canada Radio (Nielsen Soundscan)	20
US Hot R&B/Hip-Hop Songs (Billboard)	29
