= Angela Spivey =

- Born: November 9, 1959 (age 66); Chicago, Illinois
- Genres: CCM, gospel, traditional black gospel, urban contemporary gospel
- Occupations: Singer, songwriter
- Instruments: Vocals, singer-songwriter
- Years active: 1995–present
- Labels: Aleho International, Koch, Innovative

Angela Spivey (born November 9, 1959), is an American gospel musician and artist. She started her music career, in 1995, with the release of Victorious Praise by Aleho International Music. She released three more subsequent albums with Aleho International, and those were the following: 1997's In the Church, 2000's Glory, Honor and Praise!, and 2002's Determined. Her next album, Angela Spivey Live with the Voices of Victory!, was released by Koch Records in 2007. The next album, He Keeps His Promise, was released in 2012 by Innovative Records. This album was her breakthrough on the Billboard magazine charts, which it placed on the Gospel Albums and Heatseekers Albums charts.

== Early life ==
Spivey was born on November 9, 1959, in Chicago, Illinois, to a father, Harvey Spivey, who was a preacher at First Corinthians Missionary Baptist Church. She graduated at Lucy Flowers High Schools, and got a cosmetology license by going to Debbie's School of Beauty College.

== Music career ==
Her music career started in 1995, with the released of Victorious Praise on March 21, 2005, by Aleho International Music. She released her next three albums with the label, and those were the following: In the Church on March 11, 1997, Glory, Honor and Praise! on August 15, 2000, and Determined on October 22, 2002. The next album was released by Koch Records on November 6, 2007, Angela Spivey Live with the Voices of Victory! The latest album, He Keeps His Promise, was released by Innovative Records on May 1, 2012. This album would be her breakthrough release on the Billboard magazine charts, placing at No. 14 on the Gospel Albums chart along with No. 11 on the Heatseekers Albums chart.

== Discography ==
=== Studio albums ===
List of studio albums, with selected chart positions
Title	Album details	Peak chart positions	
Title	Album details	US Gos	US Heat
Victorious Praise	Released: March 21, 1995; Label: Aleho International; CD, digital download	–	–
In the Church	Released: March 21, 1997; Label: Aleho International; CD, digital download	–	–
Glory, Honor and Praise!	Released: August 15, 2000; Label: Aleho International; CD, digital download	–	–
Determined	Released: October 22, 2002; Label: Aleho International; CD, digital download	–	–
Angela Spivey Live with the Voices of Victory!	Released: November 6, 2007; Label: Koch; CD, digital download	–	–
He Keeps His Promise	Released: May 1, 2012; Label: Innovative; CD, digital download	14	11
