= Floetic =

Studio album by Floetry
- Released: 1 October 2002
- Studios: A Touch of Jazz Studios (Philadelphia, Pennsylvania)); The Mill Studio (Winfarthing, Norfolk, England)
- Genres: R&B; neo soul; hip hop
- Labels: Polydor (UK); DreamWorks (US)
- Producers: Keith "Keshon" Pelzer; Darren "Limitless" Henson; Andre Harris Vidal Davis; Ivan "Orthodox" Barias

Floetry chronology
Floetic (2002)	Floacism "Live" (2003)

Singles from Floetic
- 1. "Floetic" Released: 2002; 2. "Say Yes" Released: 2003; 3. "Getting Late" Released: 2003

Floetic is the debut studio album by the English R&B duo Floetry, released by DreamWorks Records in the United States on 1 October 2002 and on Polydor Records in the United Kingdom on 25 November 2002.

== Critical reception ==
Professional ratings
Review scores
Source	Rating
AllMusic	3/5 stars
BBC Music	(favourable)
CMJ	(favourable)
Philadelphia Weekly	(favourable)
PopMatters	(favourable)
Rhapsody	(favourable)
Rolling Stone	(favourable)
USA Today	3/4 stars
Yahoo! Music	(favourable)

The album received favourable reviews from CMJ, Rolling Stone, Yahoo! Music, and other company sites. AllMusic gave the album three out of five stars.

== Commercial performance ==
Floetic debuted at number nineteen on the Billboard 200 and number four on the Top R&B/Hip-Hop Albums. On 14 July 2003, the album was certified gold by the Recording Industry Association of America with US sales of over 864,000 copies to date.

== Track listing ==
Floetic track listing
No.	Title	Writer(s)	Producer(s)	Length
1.	"Big Ben"	Marsha Ambrosius; Natalie Stewart; Darren Henson; Keith Pelzer	Henson; Pelzer	1:54
2.	"Floetic"	Ambrosius; Mel Tormé; Robert Wells	Henson; Pelzer	4:06
3.	"Ms. Stress"	Ambrosius; Stewart; Vidal Davis	Davis	3:54
4.	"Sunshine"	Ambrosius; Stewart; Andre Harris	Harris	4:15
5.	"Getting Late"	Ambrosius; Stewart; Davis	Davis	6:49
6.	"Fun"	Ambrosius; Stewart; Henson; Pelzer	Henson; Pelzer	4:14
7.	"Mr. Messed Up"	Ambrosius; Stewart; Davis	Davis	4:22
8.	"Say Yes"	Ambrosius; Harris	Harris	4:28
9.	"Hello"	Ambrosius; Stewart; Harris; Davis	Davis	4:09
10.	"Headache"	Ambrosius; Stewart; Ivan Barias	Barias	4:04
11.	"Hey You"	Ambrosius; Stewart; Harris	Harris	5:04
12.	"If I Was a Bird"	Ambrosius; Stewart; Pelzer	Ambrosius	5:02
13.	"Opera"	Ambrosius; Stewart; Barias	Barias	4:00
14.	"Subliminal"	Ambrosius; Stewart; Henson; Pelzer	Henson; Pelzer	3:57

Bonus tracks
No.	Title	Writer(s)	Producer(s)	Length
15.	"Butterflies" (Demo Version)	Ambrosius; Harris	Harris	4:03
16.	"Now You're Gone (More Than I Can Feel)"	Stewart; Sebastian Rogers	Jonny Cole; Rogers	4:52

Samples

- "Floetic" contains an interpolation of "Born to Be Blue" as written by Mel Tormé and Robert Wells.

== Charts ==
=== Weekly charts ===
Weekly chart performance for Floetic
Chart (2002)	Peak position
Canadian R&B Albums (Nielsen SoundScan)	23
US Billboard 200	19
US Top R&B/Hip-Hop Albums (Billboard)	4

=== Year-end charts ===
Year-end chart performance for Floetic
Chart (2003)	Position
US Billboard 200	162
US Top R&B/Hip-Hop Albums (Billboard)	33

== Certifications ==
Certifications for Floetic
Region	Certification	Certified units/sales
United States (RIAA)	Gold	500,000^{^}
^{^} Shipments figures based on certification alone.
