= Flo'Ology =

Studio album by Floetry
- Released: 8 November 2005
- Studio: Blakeslee Recording Company (North Hollywood, California); IGA Studios (Santa Monica, California); Keef N D's Spot, Sigma Sound Studios, The Studio (Philadelphia, Pennsylvania); Soundvilla (Miami, Florida)
- Length: 54:25
- Label: Geffen
- Producer: Marsha Ambrosius; Jared Gosselin; Darren "Limitless" Henson; Matthew Lawrence; Keith Pelzer; Raphael Saadiq; Scott Storch

Floetry chronology
Floacism "Live" (2003)	Flo'Ology (2005)

Singles from Flo'Ology
- 1. "SupaStar" Released: 2005

Flo'Ology is the second and final studio album by the English R&B duo Floetry, released in the United States on 8 November 2005 by Geffen Records and in the United Kingdom on 14 November 2005 by Polydor Records. It debuted at number seven on the US Billboard 200 and spawned the single "SupaStar" featuring rapper Common. As of September 2010, the album has sold 363,000 in the United States.

== Critical reception ==
Professional ratings
Review scores
Source	Rating
AllMusic	3/5 stars
Entertainment Weekly	B
The Guardian	3/5 stars
PopMatters	4/10
Rolling Stone	3/5 stars
Vibe	4/5 marks

Flo'Ology received mixed reviews from music critics. AllMusic editor Rob Theakston found that Flo'Ology "rises to the top of the list as one of the best things the group has ever released. The blueprint pretty much stays the same: tasteful, funky neo-soul grooves blended with emotive R&B crooning and spoken word poetry. But there's a much-needed sense of refinement to their style and vocal delivery this time around, a hint of maturity that was lost on their debut and subsequent releases." Will Hermes of Entertainment Weekly called Flo'Ology "an elegant new set prioritizing the soul in their hip-hop/soul sound." Matilda Egere-Cooper, writing for BBC Music, called Flo'Ology a "mind-blowing album that has them stepping up their soul game once again. Joints like the head-nodder "Supastar" (featuring Common) are in the mix to satisfy the movers and the shakers; but this album really leans towards that sultry, after-hours vibe they demonstrated on their debut, Floetic."

The Guardian's Caroline Sullivan wrote that the duo conquers "so well that what remains is complete mastery of studio technique but no fabulousness. Their unusual set-up (Ambrosius sings, Stewart raps) keeps things ticking over in a lively way, and Stewart's south-London flow can be a delight [...] But this is solid rather than stunning." Renée Graham from Boston Globe called Flo'Ology an album that "shows the duo hasn't lost its potent flow." She further added: The pair still favor that black bohemian downtown groove, as sultry and warm as the glow of a candle. Floetry has always been comfortable in the company of a good ballad, and there are some fine examples here." Billboard "offers a soothing experience that freely explores the depths of love."

Mark Edwards, writing for The Times, described the album as "lush, heartwarming music." remarked: With the presence of Common on "SupaStar," and production from Scott Storch and Raphael Saadiq, this is an album pitched at the American neo-soul market. Once you accept that, however, you can enjoy the smooth soul of "Let Me In" and "My Apology," and perhaps even the ballad Sometimes "Make Me Smile," where any soppiness is outweighed by Ambrosius's spine-tingling performance." PopMatters critic Stefan Braidwood found that "on the whole then, there seem to be a fair few reasons to be into Floetry, but unfortunately the songs on this new album are not amongst that number. This [...] may be because the endemic "beats and vibes over songs" effect that’s consuming this generation of artists has also, objectively, struck here as well."

== Commercial performance ==
Flo'Ology debuted and peaked at number seven on the US Billboard 200 in the week of 17 November 2005, with first week sales of 77,000, according to Nielsen SoundScan. By September 2010, the album had sold 363,000 in the United States.

== Track listing ==
Flo'Ology track listing
No.	Title	Writer(s)	Producer(s)	Length
1.	"Blessed 2 Have"	Marsha Ambrosius; Natalie Stewart; Keith Pelzer; Darren Henson; Rick Davies; Roger Hodgson	Henson; Pelzer	3:57
2.	"SupaStar" (featuring Common)	Ambrosius; Stewart; Scott Storch; Lonnie Lynn, Jr.	Storch	4:12
3.	"Closer"	Ambrosius; Stewart; Jared Gosselin; Philip White	Jared; Whitey	4:03
4.	"My Apology"	Ambrosius; Stewart; Storch	Storch	4:06
5.	"Let Me In"	Ambrosius; Stewart; Pelzer; Henson	Pelzer; Henson	4:25
6.	"Lay Down"	Ambrosius; Stewart; Henson; Pelzer	Henson; Pelzer	5:00
7.	"Feelings"	Ambrosius	Ambrosius	5:02
8.	"Sometimes U Make Me Smile"	Ambrosius; Stewart; Henson; Pelzer	Henson; Pelzer	6:38
9.	"I'll Die"	Ambrosius; Stewart; Gosselin; White	Jared; Whitey	4:41
10.	"Imagination"	Ambrosius; Stewart; Raphael Saadiq; Robert Ozuna; Kelvin Wooten	Saadiq; Wooten	6:34
11.	"I Want U"	Ambrosius; Stewart	Ambrosius; Matthew Lawrence	5:49

UK edition bonus tracks
No.	Title	Writer(s)	Producer(s)	Length
12.	"In Your Eyes"	Ambrosius; Stewart; Gosselin; White	Jared; Whitey	4:17
13.	"Waiting in Vain"	Bob Marley	Ambrosius	3:46

Sample credits

- "Blessed 2 Have" contains excerpts from Supertramp's "School" as written by Rick Davies and Roger Hodgson.

== Charts ==
=== Weekly charts ===
Weekly chart performance for Flo'Ology
Chart (2005)	Peak position
UK Albums (OCC)	167
US Billboard 200	7
US Top R&B/Hip-Hop Albums (Billboard)	2

=== Year-end charts ===
Year-end chart performance for Flo'Ology
Chart (2006)	Position
US Top R&B/Hip-Hop Albums (Billboard)	53
