= It's Not Fair =

2002 single by Glenn Lewis

Single by Glenn Lewis

from the album World Outside My Window
- B-side: "Never Too Late"
- Released: April 2, 2002
- Recorded: November 2001
- Genre: R&B
- Length: 4:00 (Radio Edit); 4:59 (Album Version)
- Label: Epic
- Songwriter(s): G. Lewis, A. Harris, V. Davis
- Producer(s): Dre & Vidal

Glenn Lewis singles chronology
"Don't You Forget It" (2001)	"It's Not Fair" (2002)	"Back for More" (2003)

"It's Not Fair" is an R&B song by Glenn Lewis, released on April 2, 2002. Produced by Dre & Vidal, it was the second single from his debut album, World Outside My Window. The song is about a cheating girlfriend and a disloyal best friend.

== Music video ==
The song's music video was directed by Chris Robinson. In the video, Lewis goes home and finds his woman in bed with his friend. An argument ensues, and his friend leaves the house.

== Track listing ==
=== CD single ===
1. "It's Not Fair" (Radio Edit)
2. "It's Not Fair" (Album Version)
3. "It's Not Fair" (Instrumental)
4. "It's Not Fair" (A Cappella)
5. "It's Not Fair" (Callout Hook)

=== 12" single ===
A-side

1. "It's Not Fair" (Radio Edit)
2. "It's Not Fair" (Instrumental)
3. "It's Not Fair" (A Cappella)

B-side

1. "Never Too Late" (Album Version)
2. "Never Too Late" (Instrumental)

== Chart positions ==
Chart (2002)	Peak position
U.S. Billboard Hot R&B/Hip-Hop Singles & Tracks	90
