= I Still Love You (702 song) =

Single by 702 featuring Pharrell

from the album Star
- Released: February 24, 2003
- Length: 4:47
- Label: Motown
- Songwriters: Chad Hugo; Pharrell Williams
- Producer: The Neptunes

702 featuring Pharrell singles chronology
"Star" (2002)	"I Still Love You" (2003)	"Blah Blah Blah Blah" (2003)

"I Still Love You" is a song by American girl group 702 recorded for the group's third studio album Star (2003) which released through Motown Records. It was serviced to rhythmic and urban radio on February 24, 2003, as the album's second single. The song was featured on the soundtrack for the 2002 film Empire.

== Composition ==
"I Still Love You" is a "string-laden" R&B track about looking back at a relationship with a past lover, and wanting to get back together. In a 2004 interview with The Washington Post, Pharrell Williams claimed that the track was one of his favorite songs he's worked on, liking the emotion it invokes and that it "takes him on an emotional ride."

== Track listings ==
US promo CD

1. "I Still Love You" (Radio Edit) – 4:00
2. "I Still Love You" (Instrumental) – 4:46
3. "I Still Love You" (Call Out Hook) – 0:20

US promo 12" vinyl

1. "I Still Love You" (Main) – 4:46
2. "I Still Love You" (Radio Edit) – 4:00
3. "I Still Love You" (Instrumental) – 4:46
4. "Trouble" (Main) – 3:29
5. "Trouble" (Instrumental) – 3:29
6. "Trouble" (Acapella) – 3:06

== Charts ==
Weekly chart performance for "I Still Love You"
Chart (2003)	Peak position
US Hot R&B/Hip-Hop Songs (Billboard)	49
