= Floetry =

English R&B duo

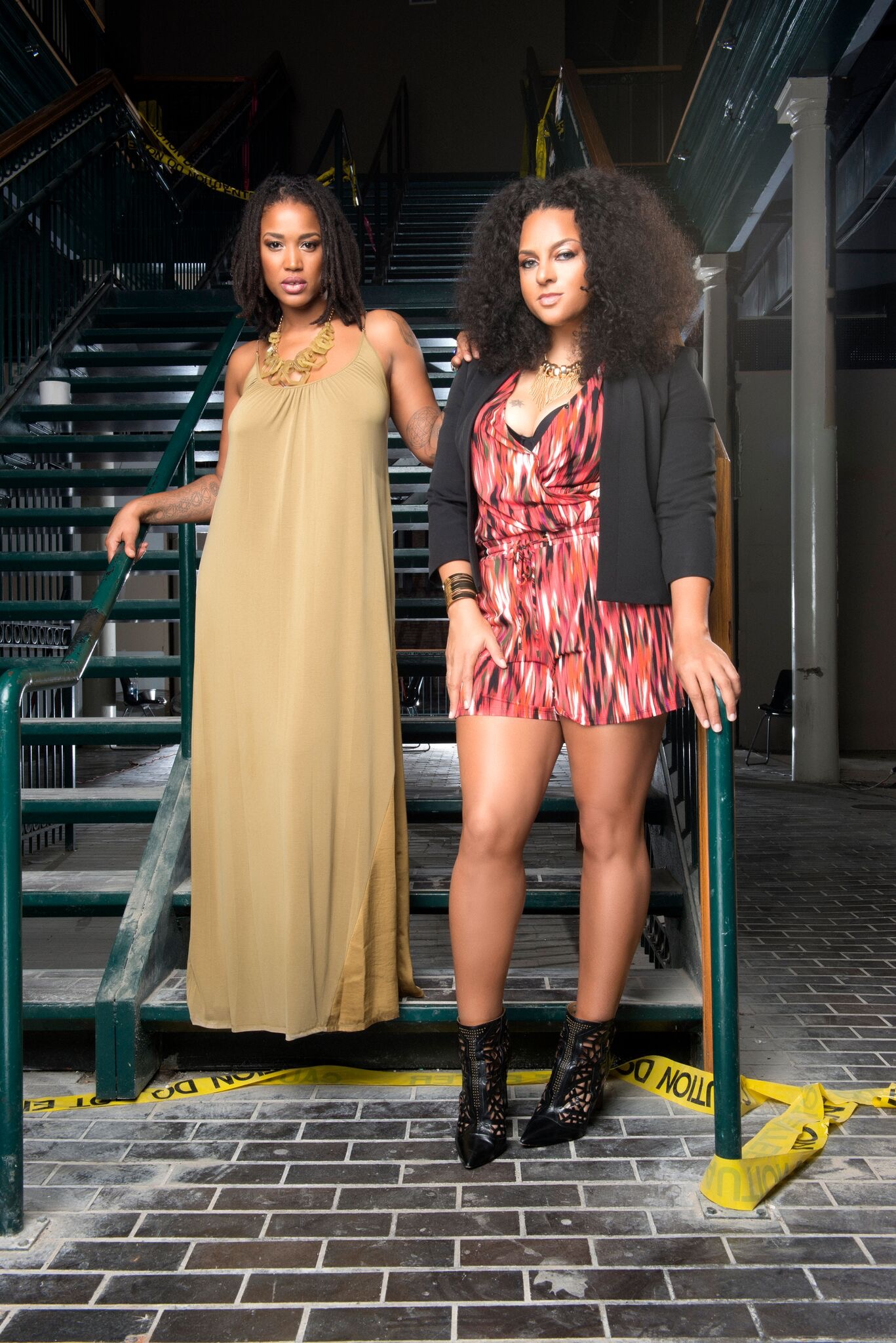
- Stewart and Ambrosius, 2016

Background information
- Origin: London, England
- Genres: R&B; neo soul; hip hop
- Works: Floetry discography
- Years active: 1997–2006; 2015–2016; 2025; 2026
- Labels: Polydor; Geffen; DreamWorks
- Members: Marsha Ambrosius; Natalie Stewart

Floetry is a British music duo formed in 1997 by singer Marsha Ambrosius ("the Songstress") and spoken-word poet Natalie Stewart ("the Floacist"). They are known for their diverse musical and performance style referred to as "poetic delivery with musical intent".

After relocating to the U.S., the duo was launched into mainstream recognition with the release of their song "Floetic" and their best-selling album, Floetic (2002), which contained the U.S. Adult R&B Songs number-one single "Say Yes". The album, Floetic, became a commercial success and received a gold certification by the Recording Industry Association of America (RIAA). Floetry followed up by touring as the opening act for several notable music acts. Their performance at the New Orleans House of Blues was recorded and released as a live album titled Floacism "Live" in November 2003. In November 2005, Floetry resurfaced with the release of their second studio album Flo'Ology. The album spawned the singles "SupaStar" and "Lay Down".

Despite critical and commercial success, the duo was disbanded as Stewart attempted to split from the duo's manager Julius Irving III as Irving wanted to change the group's musical style and image. In response, Ambrosius hired Amanda Seales (then known as Amanda Diva) for a concert tour referred to as the Floetry Remix Tour. Following the conclusion of the tour, Ambrosius and Stewart have pursued solo careers. Since the group's disbandment in 2006, Ambrosius and Stewart have reunited several times, including at a 2014 The Claphand Grand performance; which led to the Floetry Reunion Tour from 2015-2016. The group reunited again in July 2025 for three performances at the YS Firehouse in Yellow Springs, Ohio.

Floetry has sold more than 2 million records worldwide, as of 2016. The duo have three Soul Train Lady of Soul Awards, five Grammy Awards nominations, three Soul Train Music Awards nominations, and two MOBO Awards.

== History ==
=== 1994–1999: Early beginnings ===
During her enrollment in North London University, Natalie Stewart formed a poetry group called 3 Plus 1. During that time, Stewart was introduced to Marsha Ambrosius during a rival basketball game. They became friends and Stewart later found out that Ambrosius was a singer. During one of the final performances of 3 Plus 1, Stewart invited Ambrosius on stage to perform a song they wrote together called "Fantasize" in 1999. Following the positive feedback from the audience, Stewart and Ambrosius formed a music duo called Floetry.

=== 2000–2004: Career breakthrough and Floetic ===
In 2000, Floetry relocated from London to the United States. After briefly staying in Atlanta, they relocated to Philadelphia. During their time in Philadelphia, they wrote and produced songs for Jill Scott, Larry "Jazz" Anthony, and Bilal. Floetry eventually came under the management of Julius Erving III, which led to them signing a recording contract with DreamWorks Records. John McClain, who was DreamWorks's senior urban executive and Michael Jackson's then-manager, introduced them to Jackson. They penned the song "Butterflies" for his album Invincible (2001).

Floetry first charted in August 2002 with "Floetic", the lead single from their debut album Floetic, which was released in the United States on 1 October 2002, featuring productions by Keith "Keshon" Pelzer, Darren "Limitless" Henson, Andre Harris, Vidal Davis, and Ivan "Orthodox" Barias. Floetic peaked at number nineteen on the Billboard 200 and number four on the Billboard Top R&B/Hip-Hop Albums. It also managed to sell over 864,000 copies in the United States alone, earning a gold certification by the Recording Industry Association of America (RIAA). The lead single "Floetic", reached number twenty-nine on the Billboard Hot R&B/Hip-Hop Singles & Tracks and number seventy-three on the UK Singles chart. In October 2002, the duo joined India.Arie as the opening act for her Voyage to World Tour.

Floetry released their second single, "Say Yes", in January 2003. The song became more commercially successful than their predecessor, peaking at number eight on the Billboard Hot R&B/Hip-Hop Singles & Tracks chart and number twenty-four on the Billboard Hot 100. Although its follow-up single "Getting Late" failed to reproduce the success of "Say Yes", the song peaked at number thirty-three on the US Hot R&B/Hip-Hop Singles & Tracks chart and number seventeen on the US Adult R&B Songs chart. Meanwhile, the duo released a song titled "Where's the Love" on the soundtrack of American comedy film Bringing Down the House. Floetry received three Grammy Award nominations at the 45th Annual Grammy Awards. In February 2003, Floetry toured alongside Common during his Electric Circus Tour. In July 2003, Floetry garnered four nominations at Soul Train Lady of Soul Awards, of which they won: Best Single by a Group for "Say Yes", Best Album by a Group for Floetic, and Best New Group.

Floetry recorded a live album and concert film at the House of Blues in New Orleans on 3 July 2003. They released their live album Floacism on 18 November 2003, which peaked at number seventy-four on Billboard 200 and number eleven on the US Top R&B/Hip-Hop Albums chart. The album featured three new studio recorded songs, including the single "Wanna B Where U R (Thisizzaluvsong)" which features American rapper Mos Def. In 2004, Floetry earned a Grammy Award nomination for Best R&B Performance By a Duo or Group with Vocals at the 46th Annual Grammy Awards. Later that year, they made a guest appearance in American sitcom One on One's season three episode "It's a Mad, Mad, Mad Hip Hop World".

=== 2005–2006: Flo'Ology ===
In January 2005, Floetry experienced as a music label roster shift from DreamWorks Records to Geffen Records after the record label became defunct. From July to August 2005, Floetry toured with the Sugar Water Festival. During the tour, the duo made an appearance in season five of spoken word poetry television series Def Poetry Jam. On 8 November 2005, they released their second album Flo'Ology. The album debuted at number seven on the Billboard 200 and number two on the US Top R&B/Hip-Hop Albums, selling over 77,000 copies in its first week. In August 2005, the album's lead single "SupaStar", which featured American rapper Common, peaked at number fifty-five on the US Hot R&B/Hip-Hop Songs chart. Its follow-up single, "Lay Down" performed poorly, and no music video was filmed for it. In March 2006, Floetry headlined their Flo'Ology concert tour.

=== 2007–present: Disbandment and aftermath ===
Following the disappointment in album sales of Flo'Ology, Floetry's management Julius Irving III encouraged the duo to change their musical style in order to appeal to a wider audience. Irving pressed for Floetry to pursue a more hip-hop sound. Stewart, not wanting to change their sound and positive image, attempted to fire Irving as their management. Ambrosius moved forward with Irving as her manager and signed a solo record deal with Aftermath Entertainment. She later released a mixtape titled Neo Soul Is Dead. In late 2006, Floetry disbanded without making a formal announcement. In June 2007, Ambrosius embarked on the Floetry Remix Tour without Stewart, instead replacing her with American singer Amanda Seales (then known as Amanda Diva). In an interview with Club Shay Shay, Seales remarked that the tour was not well-received nor did Ambrosius ever publicly announce that a lineup change had happened along with the introduction of Seales. Seales also stated that Ambrosius attempted to fight her before a performance at The Ritz-Carlton Hotel in Atlanta. In response to the Floetry Remix Tour, Stewart did an interview on the Wendy Williams radio show to announce that she was not part of the tour as her likeness was still being used to market the tour. Following the conclusion of the tour, Seales stated that Ambrosius intended to create a new music duo with her called Floetry Remix and record an album but Ambrosius opted not to follow through.

In early 2010, Stewart attempted to reform Floetry with Ambrosius but Ambrosius declined. In November 2010, Stewart released her debut solo album, Floetic Soul, on the Shanachie Records. In March 2011, Ambrosius released her debut solo album, Late Nights & Early Mornings, on J Records. During the recording of Stewart's second album, she recorded a remake of "Say Yes" with the intention of celebrating the song's tenth anniversary with Ambrosius, however Ambrosius declined to record on the new version. In August 2012, Stewart released "Say Yes (10 Year Anniversary Edition)" as the lead single of her second album Floetry Re:Birth. In November 2012, Stewart released her second album, Floetry Re:Birth. In March 2014, Stewart released her third album Rise of the Phoenix Mermaid, followed by Ambrosius releasing her second album Friends & Lovers in July 2014.

In December 2014, Ambrosius invited Stewart on-stage to perform "Floetic" during her concert at The Clapham Grand in London. In February 2015, Stewart confirmed that duo would be touring in 2015. On 16 May 2015, Floetry reunited and performed their first show in nine years at Pepsi Funk Festival in College Park, Georgia. Despite announcing they would be recording a new album, Floetry subsequently split after the second leg of their reunion tour in August 2016.

In July 2025, Floetry reunited and performed for three dates at YS Firehouse in Yellow Springs, Ohio. In April 2026, Floetry reformed again for Say Yes: The Tour.

== Artistry ==
=== Musical style and themes ===
Floetry recorded R&B songs with styles that encompass hip hop and neo soul. The members took on stage names that emphasized their role in the group. Ambrosius, who often performs the chorus and ad-libs, adopted the stage name The Songtress while Stewart, who often performs the individual verses and ad-libs, adopted the stage name The Floacist. Stewart has often described their style as "poetic delivery with musical intent". Sister 2 Sister magazine described Floetry as "exotic sisters of the soil who present music that is deeply rooted in traditional soul, but brushed with a freshness that we haven't seen since Soul II Soul, another British union from back in the 1980s." Hana Anderson of Windy City Times interpreted their album Floetic as "a fusion of R&B music, poetry, and character-driven stories and melodies". Rob Theakston of AllMusic summarizes Flo'Ology as "tasteful, funky neo-soul grooves blended with emotive R&B crooning and spoken word poetry." Floetry have cited Bob Marley, Stevie Wonder, Michael Jackson, Prince, and Fela Kuti as their influences.

== Discography ==
Studio albums

- Floetic (2002)
- Flo'Ology (2005)

== Tours ==
Headlining

- Floetry Experience (2003)
- Flo'Ology Tour (2006)
- Floetry Reunion Tour (2014-2016)
- Say Yes: The Tour (2026)

Opening act

- Tanqueray Soul Suite Tour (2002)
- Voyage to World Tour (for India.Arie) (2002-2003)
- Electric Circus Tour (for Common) (2003)
- Sugar Water Festival Tour (2005)

== Awards and nominations ==
- Grammy Awards

Year	Category	Title	Result
2003	Best Contemporary R&B Album	Floetic	Nominated
2003	Best R&B Song	"Floetic"	Nominated
2003	Best Urban/Alternative Performance	"Floetic"	Nominated
2004	Best R&B Performance By a Duo or Group with Vocals	"Say Yes"	Nominated
2006	Best Urban/Alternative Performance	"Supastar"	Nominated

- MOBO Awards

Year	Category	Title	Result
2003	Best Album	Floetic	Nominated
2003	Best Newcomer		Nominated

- MTV Video Music Awards

Year	Category	Title	Result
2003	Breakthrough Video	"Floetic"	Nominated

- Soul Train Lady of Soul Awards

Year	Category	Title	Result
2003	Best R&B/Soul Single by a Group, Band, or Duo	"Say Yes"	Won
2003	Best R&B/Soul Album by a Group, Band, or Duo	Floetic	Won
2003	Best R&B/Soul or Rap Song of the Year	"Floetic"	Nominated
2003	Best R&B/Soul or Rap New Group, Band, or Duo		Won

- Soul Train Music Awards

Year	Category	Title	Result
2003	Best R&B/Soul Single by a Group, Band, or Duo	"Floetic"	Nominated
2003	Best R&B/Soul Album by a Group, Band, or Duo	Floetic	Nominated
2006	Best R&B/Soul Single by a Group, Band, or Duo	"SupaStar"	Nominated
