= Dre & Vidal =

American songwriting and production duo

- Origin: Philadelphia, United States
- Genres: R&B; hip hop; soul; gospel
- Occupations: Songwriter; producer; executive producer
- Instruments: Drums; keyboards; fender rhodes; bass
- Years active: 2000–present
- Members: Andre Harris; Vidal Davis

Dre & Vidal is a songwriting and production duo consisting of Andre Harris and Vidal Davis, who are best known as the main producers for Jill Scott and Glenn Lewis. Alumni of DJ Jazzy Jeff's A Touch of Jazz production team, Dre & Vidal were also instrumental in the production of Musiq Soulchild's first album.

Since 2004 they have produced several successful hits, including Ciara's "Oh", Usher's "Caught Up" and Chris Brown's "Yo (Excuse Me Miss)". The duo have also worked with Beanie Sigel, 3LW, and Bobby Valentino.

== Production discography ==
- 3LW - "Point of No Return", "I Wish"
- Alicia Keys - "So Simple"
- Anthony Hamilton - "Diamond in the Rough"
- Bilal - "You Are"
- Carl Thomas - "All You've Given"
- Mario - "Good News Bad News", "Do for Love", "Don't Do It", "Get a Lil More", "I'm Trying to Be Down" "Missin' My Woman", "Come Back to Me", "Before She Said Hi" feat. Big Sean
- Amerie - "Just Like Me"
- Donell Jones - "Do It All"
- Ludacris - "War with God", "Press the Start Button"
- Fantasia - "Baby Makin' Hips", "I Nominate You"
- Sammie - "What About Your Friend"
- Michael Jackson - "Butterflies"
- Trey Songz - "Store Run"
- Bobby V featuring Fabolous - "Let Him Go"
- Musiq Soulchild - "Love", "One Night", "Girl Next Door"
- Deitrick Haddon - "Where You Are","One Blood", "Soul Survivor
- Destiny's Child - "T-Shirt"
- Eric Roberson - "Right Back to You"
- Floetry - "Ms. Stress", "Sunshine", "Getting Late", "Mr. Messed Up", "Say Yes", "Hello", "Hey You", "Possibilities"
- Marsha Ambrosius - "Your Hands"
- The Game - "Hustler's Dream"
- Jamie Foxx - "Go to Waste"
- Joe - "Perfect Match", "Do It All", "Coulda Been the 1"
- Justin Bieber - "All That Matters", "All Bad", "Change Me", "We Are"
- Kirk Franklin - "Better"
- Ginuwine - "More"
- Macy Gray - "Things That Made Me Change"
- Rico Love - "Ride"
- Mary J. Blige - "Hurt Again", "Can't Hide from Love", "Father in You", "Gotta Be Something More", "Power of Love", "Hold On (featuring Ludacris)", "Give Me Your Love Or Way Down", "Would Have Gave It All", "Healing"
- Chris Brown - "Yo (Excuse Me Miss)","Poppin'", "Hold Up", "Apology"
- Ciara - "Oh"
- Mariah Carey - "Clown", "Lullaby"
- Glenn Lewis - "Lonely", "Is It True", "It's Not Fair", "Don't You Forget It",
- Monica - "Stop", "Thought You Had My Back"
- Jill Scott - "Jilltro", "Do You Remember", "Gettin' In the Way", "A Long Walk", "The Way", "Love Rain", "One Is the Magic #", "Show Me", "Easy Conversation", "Free", "One Time", "Sweet Justice", "Nothing (Interlude)", "Rasool", "My Petition", "I Keep", "The Light", "The Real Thing", "Rightness", "Blessed", "Said Enough", "Prepared", "Can't Wait", "Fool's Gold", "Closure", "Say Thank You", "Jahraymecofasola"
- Ruben Studdard - "After the Candles Burn"
- Usher - "Caught Up", "Superstar", "Follow Me", "Here I Stand", "Love You Gently", "Hush"
- Charlie Wilson - "Keep It Movin", "Stamina"
- Young Buck - "I'm a Soldier", "Walk with Me"
- The Notorious B.I.G. featuring The Game & Faith Evans - "1970 Somethin'"
- Donell Jones - "Do It All"
- Ludacris - "War with God", "Press the Start Button"
- Kelly Clarkson - "The Day We Fell Apart"
- Flo Rida - "Shone" featuring Pleasure P
- Robin Thicke - "2 Luv Birds"
- Crystal Aikin - "Lord, You Reign Forever"
- Miguel - "To the Moon", "Hero", "Nothing"
- Lalah Hathaway - "Strong Woman", "Lie to Me"
- Kindred the Family Soul - "Stars", "Alright", "Rightfully So", "No Limit", "The Sheddington (Intro)", "Magic Happen", "Authentically You", "S.O.S. (Sense of Security)", "The Sheddington (Outro)", "Loving the Night", "One Day Soon", "Not Complaining", "Never Loved You More", "Drop the Bomb", "Look at What We Made", "What I've Learned"
- Vivian Green - "Anything Out There", "I'm Not Prepared"
- RichGirl -"Swagger Right"
- Teyana Taylor - "Sorry"
- The Isley Brothers - "Said Enough"
- Kenny Lattimore - "Lately"
