= Glenn Lewis =

Canadian singer-songwriter (born 1975)

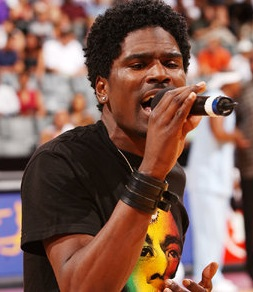

Background information
- Born: Glennon Ricketts Jr. March 13, 1975 (age 51); Kitchener, Ontario, Canada
- Origin: Toronto, Ontario, Canada
- Genres: Neo soul
- Occupation: Singer–songwriter
- Years active: 1995–present
- Labels: Sanctuary Records, Ruffhouse Records, Capitol Records, Epic Records

Glennon Ricketts Jr. (born March 13, 1975), professionally known as Glenn Lewis, is a Canadian neo soul singer–songwriter. Lewis earned a Grammy Award nomination in 2004 and has also won a Juno Award out of a total of six nominations.

== Early life ==
Lewis was born in Kitchener, Ontario and raised in Toronto by a Trinidadian mother and Jamaican father, Glennon "Glen" Ricketts Sr. Both of his parents were musicians; his father was the lead singer of Crack of Dawn in the 1970s, was a protege of the late Donny Hathaway, and had a solo career under the stage name "Glen Ricks". From the age of eight to fourteen, Lewis lived in Trinidad before moving back to Toronto. Originally planning to pursue a career in animation as a teenager, Lewis instead decided to focus on music. After moving back to the city, he attended high school at Eastern High School of Commerce Eastern Commerce Collegiate Institute, where he won a talent contest by covering Stevie Wonder's "I Just Called to Say I Love You". Lewis has cited Wonder as his biggest inspiration, and he's often been compared to him due to the similarities in their tones. After high school, Lewis began recording demos with musician Alex Greggs and performing at nightclubs, eventually becoming a respected act in the city.

== Career ==
=== Early success ===
Lewis parlayed his Toronto success into the release of his first single, "The Thing to Do", in 1997 on Beat Factory/BMG Music Canada. The song earned him a Juno Award nomination for Best R&B/Soul Recording. His second single, "Bout Your Love", was released in 1998 and garnered a second consecutive Juno nomination. That year, he also appeared on the remix of Maestro's single "Stick to Your Vision". In 1999, he was featured on the track "Whatever It Takes", which appeared on fellow Canadian singer Jazmin's debut album Better Be Good. The following year, Lewis was featured on Baby Blue Soundcrew's single "Only Be in Love", from their compilation album Private Party Collectors Edition, earning him his third consecutive Juno nomination. This exposure eventually landed him a deal with Epic Records.

=== World Outside My Window ===
Lewis' debut album on Epic Records, World Outside My Window, was released on March 19, 2002. Fueled by the hit single "Don't You Forget It", which earned him a Juno for Best R&B/Soul Recording, the album peaked at #4 on the Billboard charts. He promoted the album by touring with Alicia Keys and Tweet, among others. The album spawned a second single, "It's Not Fair" which peaked at Number 90 on the R&B chart.

In 2002, Lewis recorded a cover version of "Superstition" for the tribute album, Conception: An Interpretation of Stevie Wonder's Songs. He also appeared in the 2002 film Maid in Manhattan starring Jennifer Lopez and Ralph Fiennes, with the film's soundtrack featuring his song "Fall Again", which was originally written by Walter Afanasieff and Robin Thicke for Michael Jackson's Invincible album, but did not make it onto the track list. A demo of the song by Michael Jackson was later released on the Michael Jackson: The Ultimate Collection CD set. Later that year, he released his first concert DVD, Glenn Lewis Live.

=== 2003–2009 ===
In 2003, Lewis began work on his sophomore album Back for More. The first single, also titled "Back for More", and featuring rapper Kardinal Offishall, was released to radio and a video began to air. However, the album was later shelved by his label.

Later that year, Lewis netted a Grammy nomination for his contribution to Stanley Clarke's "Where Is the Love", a duet also featuring Amel Larrieux. Lewis was also the recipient of an International Achievement Award for the song "Don't You Forget It" at the SOCAN Awards in Toronto.

In 2006, he signed with Underdog Entertainment and began work on an album with The Underdogs titled, Remember Me which was to be released in 2007. He premiered the song "Storm" in October 2006 which created a huge viral buzz in the underground soul music world. Shortly thereafter in 2007, Lewis parted ways with The Underdogs.

During this time Lewis performed frequently overseas, particularly in London where he developed a strong following.

=== Moment of Truth ===
Lewis reconnected with Andre Harris and Vidal Davis "Dre & Vidal", the producers of his first album, "World Outside My Window" in 2009. On December 14, 2010, a popular soul music website leaked the song "Good One" leading Lewis to officially release the song the following week. He released the official music video in September 2011. On November 9, 2011, Lewis signed with Ruffhouse Entertainment with his upcoming album project distributed through Capitol/Caroline.

On April 29, 2013, Lewis debuted his single "Can't Say Love" which was #2 most added at Urban AC Radio and hit #25 on BDS.

His album Moment of Truth was released October 15, 2013 and features production from Grammy Award-winning duo Dre & Vidal, DJ Camper, Carvin Haggins & Ivan Barias, Certifyd and up-and-coming producers Matrax as well as a duet with Roc Nation vocalist Melanie Fiona.

=== Chasing Goosebumps ===
In 2017, he collaborated with DJ Jazzy Jeff on a concept album with ThePLAYLIST called Chasing Goosebumps which was recorded and mixed in 7 days.

== Discography ==
=== Albums ===
- World Outside My Window (2002)
- Moment of Truth (2013)
- Chasing Goosebumps (2017) (with ThePLAYLIST)
- Overture (2026)

=== Singles ===
Year	Single	Chart positions			Album
Year	Single	U.S.	U.S. R&B	U.S. Adult R&B	Album
1997	"The Thing to Do"	—	—	—	GROOVEssentials Volume One
1998	"Bout Your Love"	—	—	—	Rudimental 2k
2001	"Don't You Forget It"	30	10	—	World Outside My Window
2002	"It's Not Fair"	—	90	—	World Outside My Window
2002	"What's Come Over Me?" (with Amel Larrieux)	—	—	—	Barbershop (soundtrack)
2002	"Fall Again"	—	—	—	Maid in Manhattan soundtrack
2003	"Back for More" (feat. Kardinal Offishall)	—	76	—	non-album single
2010	"Good One"	—	—	—	non-album single
2013	"Can't Say Love"	—	—	21	Moment of Truth
2014	"Closer"	—	—	—	Moment of Truth
2023	"This Christmas with Glenn Lewis": "I'll Be Home for Christmas" and "The Christmas Song"	—	—	—	non-album singles
2026	"Past Tense"	—	—	—	non-album singles
