= Getting Late (Floetry song) =

2003 single by Floetry

Single by Floetry

from the album Floetic
- Released: 2003
- Recorded: 2002
- Genre: Neo soul
- Length: 6:50 (album version); 4:04 (single edit)
- Label: Polydor (UK); DreamWorks (US)
- Songwriters: Natalie Stewart; Marsha Ambrosius; Vidal Davis

Floetry singles chronology
"Let's Get Wild" (2003)	"Getting Late" (2003)	"Wanna B Where U R (Thisizzaluvsong)" (2003)

"Getting Late" is a song by performed by English neo soul group Floetry, issued as the third and final single from their debut studio album Floetic. It was written by Natalie Stewart and Marsha Ambrosius along with Vidal Davis; and it peaked at #31 on the Billboard R&B chart in 2003. The song was sampled on Drake's song "Flight's Booked", from his album Honestly, Nevermind.

== Chart positions ==
Chart (2003)	Peak position
US Hot R&B/Hip-Hop Singles & Tracks (Billboard)	31
