= Say Yes (Floetry song) =

2003 single by Floetry

Single by Floetry

from the album Floetic
- B-side: "Floetic"
- Released: 24 January 2003
- Recorded: 2002
- Genre: Neo soul
- Length: 4:28
- Label: Polydor (UK); DreamWorks (US)
- Songwriter(s): Marsha Ambrosius; Andre Harris
- Producer(s): Andre Harris

Floetry singles chronology
"Floetic" (2002)	"Say Yes" (2003)	"Getting Late" (2003)

Music video
- "Say Yes" on YouTube

"Say Yes" is a song by English music duo Floetry. The song was issued as the second single from their debut studio album Floetic (2002), on 24 January 2003. It was written by Marsha Ambrosius along with Andre Harris, and was produced by Harris. The song was the group's only single to chart on the Billboard Hot 100, peaking at #24 in 2003.

In 2014, Ambrosius revealed "Say Yes" was originally written for Ronald Isley for inclusion on The Isley Brothers' 2001 album, Eternal. However, Isley rejected the song in favor of the Jill Scott featured "Said Enough".

In 2004, the song was nominated for a Grammy Award for Best R&B Performance by a Duo or Group with Vocal, but lost to "My Boo" by Usher and Alicia Keys. In 2012, Floetry member Natalie "The Floacist" Stewart recorded the song for her sophomore album Floetry Re:Birth.

== Music video ==
The official music video for the song was directed by Jeremy Rall. The video begins with Marsha riding the subway along with other passengers. As she singing the song, she begins writing the lyrics of the song in her notebook. Meanwhile, Natalie is walking down the street and towards the subway station. She is seen passing various people including a professional skater (Cato Williams), a young couple, a young female soccer team, and a starving artist. Upon entering the subway station, Natalie is flattered by a puppeteer (E Reece) who performing a street puppet show. The video ends with Natalie catching the train and sitting next to Marsha as they ride away. A scene flips back to passengers of the train who deep in their own thought. Omari Hardwick makes a cameo appearance as an artist who is one of the passengers that appears to be drawing a picture of Marsha.

The music video for the song takes place at a subway station in the downtown section of Los Angeles, California.

== Track listing ==
- CD Single and 12-inch vinyl
1. Say Yes (Radio Edit)
2. Say Yes (Alternate Version)
3. Say Yes (Album Version)
4. Say Yes (Instrumental)
5. Say Yes (A Cappella)

== Chart positions ==
=== Weekly charts ===
Chart (2003)	Peak position
US Billboard Hot 100	24
US Hot R&B/Hip-Hop Singles & Tracks (Billboard)	8

=== Year-end charts ===
Chart (2003)	Position
US Billboard Hot 100	100
US Hot R&B/Hip-Hop Songs (Billboard)	27

== Cover versions ==
Smooth jazz musician and saxophonist Pamela Williams covered the song from her 2006 album Elixir.
