= Floetic (song) =

2002 single by Floetry

Single by Floetry

from the album Floetic
- B-side: "Say Yes (Timbaland remix)"
- Released: 2002
- Genre: Neo soul; R&B; hip hop
- Length: 4:06
- Label: Polydor (UK); DreamWorks (US)
- Songwriters: Marsha Ambrosius; Mel Tormé; Robert Wells
- Producers: Darren Henson; Keith Pelzer

Floetry singles chronology
"Floetic" (2002)	"Say Yes" (2003)

Music video
- "Floetic" on YouTube

"Floetic" is the debut single by Floetry, released in August 2002. It is from their debut studio album of the same name, and was written primarily by lead singer Marsha Ambrosius. The song contains a sample of the Jack Bruce cover of Mel Tormé's song "Born to Be Blue". It peaked at No. 29 on the Billboard R&B chart in 2002.

In 2003, the song was nominated for Grammy Awards for Best R&B Song and Best Urban/Alternative Performance, but lost to "Love of My Life" by Erykah Badu and Common; and "Little Things" by India.Arie, respectively.

== Music video ==
The official music video for the song was directed by Marc Klasfeld.

== Chart positions ==
Chart (2002)	Peak position
US Hot R&B/Hip-Hop Singles & Tracks (Billboard)	29
