= Nothing Even Matters =

1998 song by Lauryn Hill featuring D'Angelo

Song by Lauryn Hill featuring D'Angelo

from the album The Miseducation of Lauryn Hill
- Published: August 19, 1998
- Recorded: 1997
- Studio: Chung King; Right Track; Sony (New York City)
- Genre: Neo soul; R&B; quiet storm
- Length: 5:49
- Label: Ruffhouse; Columbia
- Songwriter: Lauryn Hill
- Producer: Lauryn Hill

Audio
- "Nothing Even Matters" on YouTube

"Nothing Even Matters" is a song recorded by American rapper and singer Lauryn Hill for her debut solo studio album The Miseducation of Lauryn Hill (1998). It was written and produced by Hill herself, and features a guest appearance from American singer D'Angelo. The song is an electric piano-driven neo soul, R&B and quiet storm ballad. Lyrically a love song, it discusses falling in love and exploring an idyllic romantic relationship, presumably in reference to Hill's relationship with Rohan Marley.

Upon the release of The Miseducation of Lauryn Hill, "Nothing Even Matters" received mixed reviews from music critics, some of whom praised Hill and D'Angelo's vocal performances and chemistry, while others criticized its composition. Acclaim prevailed in retrospective commentaries, with plaudits predominantly directed towards the song's lyrical theme. While never released as a single, the song was nominated for Best R&B Performance by a Duo or Group with Vocal at the 41st Annual Grammy Awards (1999), in addition to receiving sufficient airplay to reach number five on the US Bubbling Under Hot 100, an extension to the Billboard Hot 100. Initially not promoting it with live performances, Hill has performed "Nothing Even Matters" in a multitude of her concerts since 2011.

== Background and development ==
In 1996, Lauryn Hill met Rohan Marley, son of Bob Marley, while touring as a member of the Fugees, in support of their widely successful second studio album The Score. Hill and Marley gradually formed a close relationship, and during the tour, Hill became pregnant with his child. After contributing to fellow Fugees member Wyclef Jean's solo debut Wyclef Jean Presents The Carnival (1997), Hill refrained from touring and recording due to her pregnancy and cases of writer's block. However, circumstances in her life stimulated her to record a solo album, having already expressed the desire to do so and depart from the Fugees. Of the early writing process, Hill said: "Every time I got hurt, every time I was disappointed, every time I learned, I just wrote a song." While inspired, Hill wrote over 30 songs in her attic studio in South Orange, New Jersey. Hill's perennial affinity for soul duos, such as Marvin Gaye and Tammi Terrell, and Roberta Flack and Donny Hathaway, prompted her to write a duet of her own, which would eventually become "Nothing Even Matters". She reflected: "I wanted to make a love song, á la [Flack and Hathaway], and give people a humanistic approach to love again without all the physicality and overt sexuality."

== Writing and recording ==
Che Pope, one of Hill's collaborators in producing The Miseducation of Lauryn Hill, conceived the melody of "Nothing Even Matters" by using a finger snapping pattern. Fellow producer Vada Nobles subsequently presented the track to Hill, who was initially apathetic towards it. However, being under pressure from Sony Music to complete the album, she quickly came up with lyrics for the song. According to the album's liner notes, she wrote, arranged, and produced the song herself. D'Angelo, who is featured on lead vocals alongside Hill, also played the Rhodes piano alongside James Poyser and Loris Holland. Hill initially invited D'Angelo to her New Jersey residence, where she played him numerous tracks and gave him a rough demo copy. They subsequently went into the studio to record the song together; D'Angelo recorded his vocals within an hour. Hill attributed her selection of D'Angelo as the collaborator to their "similar philosophy", adding that he helped her achieve the desired effect of a song about "what it's like when your back starts to tingle and your stomach feels funny". "Nothing Even Matters" was recorded by Gordon "Commissioner Gordon" Williams, the project supervisor of The Miseducation of Lauryn Hill, alongside Warren Riker, Storm Jefferson, and Tony Prendatt, at the Sony Music Studios, Right Track Studios, and the Chung King Studios, all in New York City.

In November 1998, three months after the release of The Miseducation of Lauryn Hill, New Ark (Nobles, Rasheem Pugh, Tejumold Newton, and Johari Newton) filed a 50-page lawsuit against Hill, her management and her record labels, stating that Hill "used their songs and production skills, but failed to properly credit them for the work." New Ark demanded songwriting and/or production credits for 13 of the album's 14 tracks, alongside monetary reimbursement. The collective stated they were the primary songwriters on two tracks—one of which is "Nothing Even Matters", for which they received no credits. The lawsuit was eventually settled out of court in February 2001, for a reported $5 million.

== Music and lyrics ==
"Nothing Even Matters"
A neo soul-R&B ballad, "Nothing Even Matters" discusses an idyllic romantic relationship, whose strength is superior even to apocalyptic catastrophes.

"Nothing Even Matters" is composed in the key of A-flat major, according to the sheet music published at Musicnotes.com by Sony/ATV Music Publishing. Its tempo is a moderately slow 78 beats per minute, in common time. Sheldon Pearce of Pitchfork classified "Nothing Even Matters" as a neo soul track, while Victoria L. Johnson from Complex described it as "classic R&B". In his review of The Miseducation of Lauryn Hill for Rolling Stone, journalist Touré described the song as a "dramatic" ballad. Biographer Chris Nickson identified it as reminiscent of quiet storm. Driven by a Rhodes piano, the track's instrumentation is also based on a Wurlitzer electronic piano and a Hammond organ, as played by Loris Holland, and is interspersed with Al Anderson's guitar. Finger snaps accompany Hill and D'Angelo's "twining, crystalline" vocal performances. The pair sing in "buttery" falsettos, according to Carma Henry of The Westside Gazette. Their vocal range spans one octave and two semitones, from the low note of E♭_{4} to the high note of F_{5}.

Lyrically, "Nothing Even Matters" offered a brighter and more intimate view on love, the recurring theme of The Miseducation of Lauryn Hill, than the album's other love songs, most of which were bitter from Hill's previous relationship with Wyclef Jean. Interpreted as a dedication to Hill's then-partner Rohan Marley, the song discussed an "effortless" love, in contrast with the relationship complexities, betrayal, and heartbreak on which most of the album's lyrical content centered. In an analysis published by NPR, writer Namwali Serpell emphasizes the comparison of love to utopia through "annihilation of time and space" within the lyrics, elaborating: "The force of love matches — and even beats — the percussive quaking of a world, which seems, by comparison, so very small." Nickson reflected on the lyricism's applicability to Hill's personal life: "The singer was in love, but she'd learned from her experiences. The outside world might not matter, and she was head over heels, but this was the real thing, not the illusions she'd gone through before, and she understood the difference."

== Critical reception ==
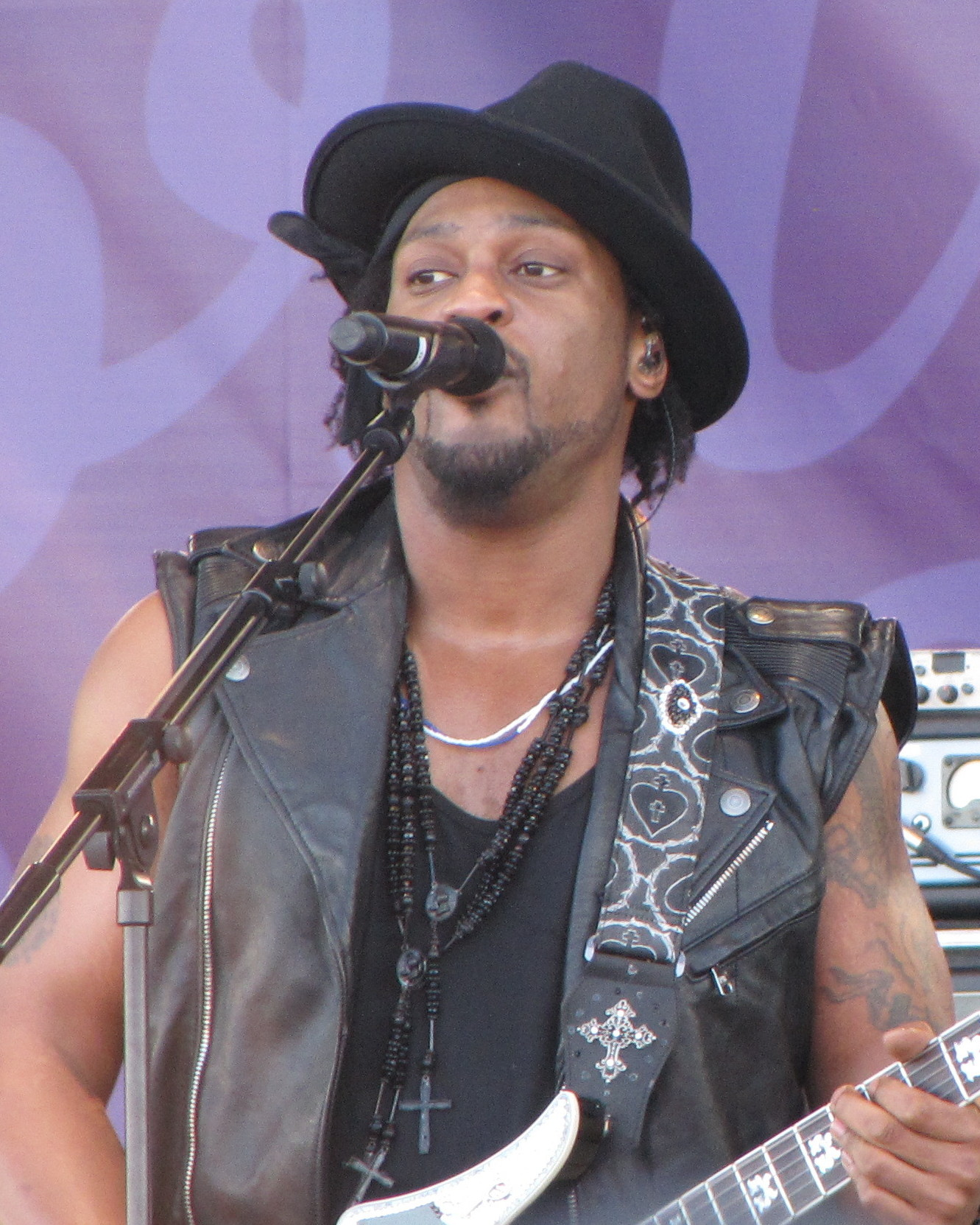
Fusion of Hill's voice with D'Angelo's (pictured) on "Nothing Even Matters" was met with widespread acclaim.

Upon the release of The Miseducation of Lauryn Hill, "Nothing Even Matters" received mixed reviews from music critics. Neil Lieberman from Pitchfork branded the track a "tiresome" ballad, criticizing its placement on the record. Writing for Q, Dom Phillips called the song a "schmaltzy ballad" which added a redundant "heavyweight touch" to the album. Conversely, Chris Nickson described it as a "gorgeous, sexy slow jam", and praised Hill and D'Angelo's vocal chemistry. Regardless of the critical polarity, the song was nominated for Best R&B Performance by a Duo or Group with Vocal at the 41st Annual Grammy Awards (1999), contributing to Hill becoming the female artist with most Grammy Award nominations in a single ceremony, with 10.

Critical acclaim for "Nothing Even Matters" prevailed in retrospective commentaries. Nick Butler from Sputnikmusic called the song "excellent", while Carma Henry of The Westside Gazette hailed Hill and D'Angelo's vocal performances as "stunning". Jacinta Howard of Rock the Bells also praised the pair's performance, describing the song as "timeless". Victoria L. Johnson included the track on the list of Hill's best songs, published via Complex, writing that Hill and D'Angelo's voices "blend together and make the world melt away". Veracia Ankrah from Exclaim! called the song "the most sultry ballad" on The Miseducation of Lauryn Hill. Writing for Tidal in 2018, Touré praised the song's lyrical theme of love, as "[t]here's not enough discussion of love in hip-hop. There's a lot more discussion of violence, of pain, of anger, of revenge". In the same article, Kris Ex and Michael A. Gonzales both listed "Nothing Even Matters" among their favorite tracks from the album, with Gonzales calling its Rhodes piano instrumentation "quite haunting".

== Commercial performance ==
While never released as a single from The Miseducation of Lauryn Hill, "Nothing Even Matters" began receiving heavy unsolicited airplay across urban adult contemporary radio stations in the US, consequently reaching number 15 on the Adult R&B Songs chart. Prior to December 5, 1998, songs were ineligible to enter the Billboard Hot 100 and Hot R&B/Hip-Hop Songs if not released as commercially available singles. Hence, "Nothing Even Matters" was able to enter solely airplay charts, reaching number 20 on the R&B/Hip-Hop Airplay. Following Billboard's rule alteration, the song entered the Hot R&B/Hip-Hop Songs, where it peaked at number 25 on February 27, 1999, and spent a total of 18 weeks. However, it did not garner sufficient airplay to enter the Billboard Hot 100, peaking at number five on its extension chart Bubbling Under Hot 100 on March 20.

== Live performances ==
Hill and D'Angelo never performed "Nothing Even Matters" live together, and Hill did not perform it live until 2011, when she performed the entirety of The Miseducation of Lauryn Hill for the first time during the annual hip hop festival Rock the Bells. She performed at all three of its August–September dates, to a mixed reception. In subsequent years, Hill continued incorporating the song into set lists for her concerts. When a fan requested the track during her February 2017 show at the Riverside Theater in Milwaukee, Wisconsin, Hill quickly taught it to her band on stage and performed it. In 2018, she included "Nothing Even Matters" on the set list for The Miseducation of Lauryn Hill 20th Anniversary Tour. Reviewing the September 12 show at the Veterans Memorial Coliseum in Portland, Oregon, Eric Diep from Billboard called the track's rendition "moving". D'Angelo performed the song with H.E.R. during his appearance on Verzuz in February 2021. Hill further included the track to the set list for The Miseducation of Lauryn Hill 25th Anniversary Tour in 2023, with Andre Gee of Rolling Stone praising its performance during the October 17 show at the Prudential Center in Hill's hometown of Newark, New Jersey.

== Legacy ==
As D'Angelo collaborated with Hill on The Miseducation of Lauryn Hill, she was expected to contribute to his second studio album Voodoo (2000). His cover of Roberta Flack's "Feel Like Makin' Love" was originally conceived as a duet with Hill. Although they sent each other tapes, the concept was aborted due to scheduling conflicts, and D'Angelo instead recorded the song solely. Regardless, in their reviews of Voodoo, several critics mentioned Hill apparently performing background vocals, though that was never confirmed, nor did Hill receive any credits for the track. In a 2008 interview for Rolling Stone, D'Angelo reflected on his time recording with Hill fondly, and noted the impact of "Nothing Even Matters" on Church music, as "Churches were substituting God in the lyrics" of the song. Furthermore, Jacinta Howard credited it for becoming a "new wedding classic", likening the song to Luther Vandross and Cheryl Lynn's cover of Marvin Gaye and Tammi Terrell's "If This World Were Mine", and Stevie Wonder's "Ribbon in the Sky".

Touré credited "Nothing Even Matters" with broadening horizons of lyricism in hip hop, stating: "Culturally, soul music was dominant before hip-hop, and that was all about love. The culture has shifted to discussing everything else, and to have this icon who we looked up to come out and be a warrior for love was really, really powerful." Singer Andra Day revealed that the song helped with calming her childhood anxiety. She further attributed the ability to "bring the rawness of classic records to a modern generation without compromising the grit" to the song, adding that it showed how "writing authentically about simple concepts like feeling love in one moment in time can actually be incredibly complex, and create a real, tangible moment for the listener". Rapper J. Cole sampled a vocal excerpt from "Nothing Even Matters" on his 2013 track "Cole Summer", and, in 2022, singer Sir sampled the song on his own "Nothing Even Matters".

== Credits and personnel ==
Credits are adapted from the liner notes of The Miseducation of Lauryn Hill.

- Al Anderson – guitar
- Tom Barney – bass
- D'Angelo – lead vocals, Rhodes
- Francis Dunnery – guitar
- Storm Jefferson – recording
- Lauryn Hill – arrangement, lead vocals, production, songwriting
- Loris Holland – electric piano, Hammond B-3, Rhodes, Wurlitzer
- Che "Guevara" Pope – drum programming
- James Poyser – Rhodes
- Tony Prendatt – recording
- Warren Riker – recording
- Chip Verspyck – engineering assistance
- Brian Vibberts – engineering assistance
- Gordon "Commissioner Gordon" Williams – mix engineering, mixing, recording

== Charts ==
1998–1999 weekly chart performance
Chart	Peak position
US Bubbling Under Hot 100 (Billboard)	5
US Adult R&B Songs (Billboard)	15
US Hot R&B/Hip-Hop Songs (Billboard)	25

== Certifications ==
Certifications
Region	Certification	Certified units/sales
New Zealand (RMNZ)	Gold	15,000^{‡}
^{‡} Sales+streaming figures based on certification alone.
