= To Zion =

1998 promotional single by Lauryn Hill

Promotional single by Lauryn Hill featuring Carlos Santana

from the album The Miseducation of Lauryn Hill
- Written: 1997
- Released: November 18, 1998
- Recorded: 1997
- Studio: Chung King (New York); Perfect Pair (East Orange); Circle House (Miami)
- Genre: Hip-hop; gospel
- Length: 6:09 (Note: The actual length of "To Zion" is four minutes and 33 seconds. However, its album version contains an interlude following the end of the song, which pushes its total length to six minutes and nine seconds. The interlude is excluded from the song's single versions.)
- Label: Ruffhouse; Columbia
- Composers: Lauryn Hill; Charles Fox; Norman Gimbel (Note: Though uncredited in the original liner notes of The Miseducation of Lauryn Hill, Fox and Gimbel later received composing credits for "To Zion", as it contains elements from their song "And the Feeling's Good", recorded by José Feliciano.)
- Lyricist: Lauryn Hill
- Producers: Lauryn Hill; Che Guevara

Audio
- "To Zion" on YouTube

"To Zion" is a song recorded by American rapper and singer Lauryn Hill for her debut solo studio album The Miseducation of Lauryn Hill (1998). It was written and produced by Hill herself, while Che Pope received a co-production credit under his pseudonym Che Guevara. Featuring American guitarist Carlos Santana, "To Zion" is an acoustic Spanish guitar-driven hip-hop and gospel track. Lyrically, it is a tribute to Hill's oldest son Zion David Marley, to whom she gave birth in 1997, during her relationship with Rohan Marley.

"To Zion" discusses Hill's decision not to terminate her pregnancy in favor of her burgeoning career, while further lyrical themes derive from spirituality, rebirth and Hill's relationship with God. The lyricism elicited unanimous acclaim from music critics upon the release of The Miseducation of Lauryn Hill, with numerous journalists accentuating the track as a focal point on the album. The song was subsequently released as a promotional single on November 18, 1998, by Ruffhouse Records and Columbia Records, peaking at number 77 on the US Hot R&B/Hip-Hop Songs.

Hill performed "To Zion" live with Santana at the 41st Annual Grammy Awards (1999), and has included it on set lists for all of her concert tours. In retrospective commentaries, the critics have acknowledged the influence "To Zion" has had on artistry of numerous rappers who achieved mainstream prominence decades after the song's release, as well as the impact its lyrical message of encouragement to pursue motherhood simultaneously with a career has had on various female celebrities. Furthermore, a multitude of recording artists have sampled or referenced the song in their respective works.

== Background and development ==
In 1996, while touring as a member of the Fugees, Lauryn Hill met Rohan Marley, son of Bob Marley. The pair gradually formed a close relationship, and Hill soon became pregnant with his child. After contributing to fellow Fugees member Wyclef Jean's solo debut Wyclef Jean Presents The Carnival (1997), Hill refrained from touring and recording due to her pregnancy and cases of writer's block. The pregnancy, however, eventually reinvigorated Hill's creativity, as she developed a desire to write in a larger capacity than before. Of the early writing process, she said: "Every time I got hurt, every time I was disappointed, every time I learned, I just wrote a song." Hill gave birth to Zion David Marley on August 3, 1997. She chose the name Zion as she considered it substantial and powerful, elucidating: "[Zion] personally delivered me from my emotional and spiritual drought. He just replenished my newness. When he was born, I felt like I was born again."

Hill revealed that her affinity with Latin music came from a young age, crediting her parents' record collection for introducing her to the Latin rock band Santana. She frequently listened to their second studio album Abraxas (1970), accentuating its instrumental track "Samba Pa Ti" and further elaborating: "I used to write my first songs to other people's music, and this particular album had this beautiful, soulful guitar, and it was instrumental, so I was in heaven. From that time – Oye Como Va, Black Magic Woman – all those songs just really touched me, and gave me an appreciation for guitar and for the Latin African rhythms." Hill's admiration for Santana stimulated her to seek their frontman Carlos Santana out to collaborate with her. Their collaborative effort would become "To Zion", and Hill consequently wrote, produced and recorded "Do You Like the Way" for Santana's subsequent album Supernatural (1999). (Note: Hill's contributions on "Do You Like the Way" would win her her second consecutive Grammy Award for Album of the Year, for Supernatural, at the 42nd Annual Grammy Awards (2000).)

== Writing and recording ==
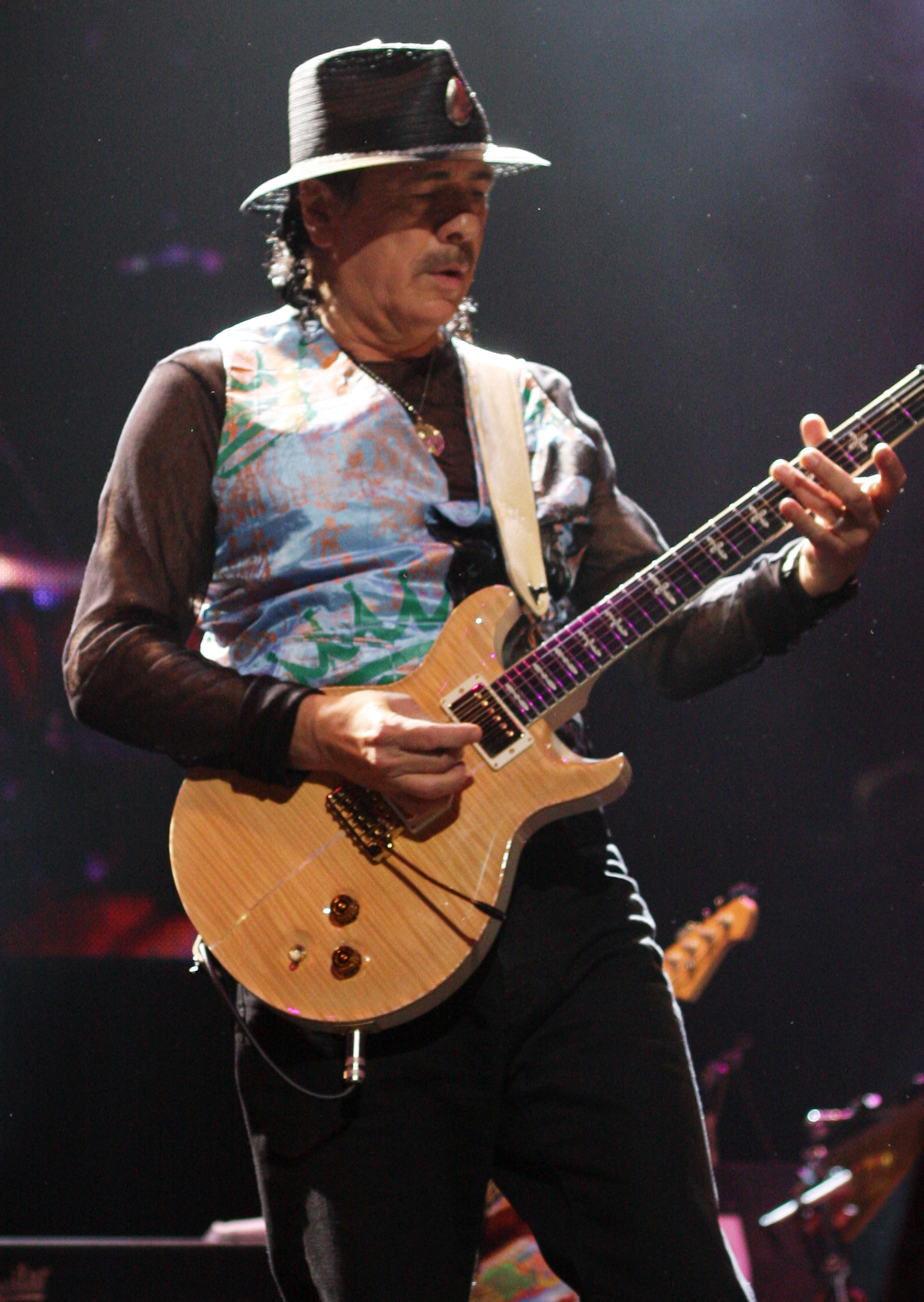
American guitarist Carlos Santana (pictured) is featured on "To Zion".

"To Zion" was written solely by Hill. According to her then-manager Jayson Jackson, the songwriting was prompted by Wendy Williams revealing Hill's pregnancy on her radio show in 1997, and subsequent intense media scrutiny over the identity of the child's father, as Hill had never publicized her relationship with Marley prior to the pregnancy. Che Pope, who was credited as the song's co-producer under his pseudonym Che Guevara, produced the track within 20 minutes inside a small studio apartment in Brooklyn. After he presented Hill with the instrumental, she told him she had conceived a song about her child and was uncertain over which musical style would be suitable until she heard Pope's track. Hill subsequently recorded the song at the Chung King Studios in New York City and the Perfect Pair Studios in East Orange, New Jersey in late 1997. Carlos Santana recorded his guitar instrumental at the Circle House Studios in Miami. As the song contains sampled elements from "And the Feeling's Good" by José Feliciano, the latter's songwriters Norman Gimbel and Charles Fox retrospectively received composing credits for "To Zion", having originally been uncredited as its writers.

The Miseducation of Lauryn Hill became the subject of a lawsuit soon after its release, as the music collective New Ark (consisting of Vada Nobles, Rasheem Pugh, Tejumold Newton, and Johari Newton) sued Hill for having used their songwriting and production efforts, but failed to properly credit them for the contributions. In addition to reimbursement, New Ark demanded co-writing credits for 13 out of the album's 14 tracks. "To Zion" was the sole track excluded from the stipulation, with Nobles remarking the song "was her baby because it was about her child. Can't nobody interfere with that right there." The lawsuit was eventually settled out of court in February 2001, for a reported $5 million. While Pope was not involved in the lawsuit, he claimed he solely produced "To Zion", despite being merely credited as a co-producer, and contemplated filing a lawsuit of his own but ultimately abandoned the idea.

== Music and lyrics ==
"To Zion"
Hill serenades her son Zion with a lullaby and reflects with blunt candour on past contemplations of whether or not to proceed with the pregnancy, as Carlos Santana plays "sweet", rolling guitar licks in the background.

"To Zion" is composed in the key of E major, according to the sheet music published by Sony/ATV Music Publishing. Eric Weisbard from Spin described the song's sound as "Revolutionary War fife roll convert[ing] into hip-hop". The instrumental track is driven by acoustic Spanish guitar licks, as laid by Carlos Santana, which are interspersed with a military march. The song's tempo is a moderate 86 beats per minute, in common time, while Hill's vocal range spans around one and a half octave from the low note of C♯_{4} to the high note of G_{5}. Weisbard compared the song's structure to the works of John Lennon and Hill's vocal performance to Dionne Warwick at the end of her 1962 song "Don't Make Me Over".

One of the more introspective tracks on The Miseducation of Lauryn Hill, "To Zion" is an emotional tribute to Hill's son Zion David Marley. As Hill serenades her son, she discusses her unplanned pregnancy and the decision not to terminate it, despite the profuse pressure to do so in favor of her burgeoning career. A spiritual lyrical theme becomes distinguished through Hill's conversations with God regarding the outcome of her pregnancy, prayers for her son's safety and welfare, and learning "love of God through love of her child". (Note: One of the more predominant lyrical themes on The Miseducation of Lauryn Hill is learning to love, which is made apparent by classroom interludes spread throughout the record. On the interludes, American poet and politician Ras Baraka portrays a teacher speaking with children about the concept of love. In a retrospective analysis, Carvel Wallace from Pitchfork acknowledged the love learnt on "To Zion" represents the love of God Hill learned through the love of her child.) According to Dr. Venus Opal Reese in the book Recharting the Black Atlantic (2008), apart from the name of Hill's son, the song's title also biblically refers to Mount Zion, as Hill equates her son to the "Prince of Peace". While she initially conveys insecurity and vulnerability over the contemplation, she ultimately declares "now the joy of my world is in Zion", and thanks God for "a gift so great". Regarding the lyricism, Hill clarified: "I wanted it to be a revolutionary song about a spiritual movement, and also about my spiritual change, going from one place to another because of my son." Due to religious connotations within the theme, biographer Chris Nickson classified "To Zion" as a gospel track.

== Critical reception ==
"To Zion" received unanimous acclaim from music critics, both upon the release of The Miseducation of Lauryn Hill and in retrospective commentaries. Writing for Q, Dom Phillips complimented the song's instrumentation by saying it "neatly flutters Spanish guitar over a military march". John Mulvey from NME listed the track among the highlights of The Miseducation of Lauryn Hill, remarking that "emotional heroism prevails over poor-superstar whingeing" in its lyrics. In Rolling Stone, American writer and journalist Touré also labeled it one of the album's standout tracks, describing it as an "epic, adoring tribute to her young son" and commending Santana's guitar performance. Nick Butler of Sputnikmusic stated the track could "easily descend into cheesy power-ballad territory" but nonetheless has "grit, imagination, and power". While retrospectively discussing its parent album, MTV's Kyle Anderson highlighted the song by calling it "sweet".

David Opie from Highsnobiety praised "To Zion", writing: "It's the way that Lauryn effortlessly combines the confessional with the celebratory here which truly speaks to her strength, teaching others to live their truth without letting subsequent struggles consume them." Justin Tinsley of Andscape shared Opie's sentiments, describing the song as "beautifully strong and transparent". Brandon Tensley wrote for Time that the thesis of The Miseducation of Lauryn Hill manifested itself on "To Zion", as Hill "creates an emotive space in which she can be vulnerable, sometimes uncomfortably so". Okla Jones of Essence declared the song as Hill's best, calling it "[p]erhaps the most beautiful song in Hill's entire body of work", while Victoria L. Johnson included it on a list of Hill's best songs published via Complex and stated: "The choir's chant of 'marching' propels the song to another level of intense devotion. Carlos Santana's incredible guitar playing only deepens the sonic connection." Ranking "To Zion" as Hill's third best song via The Guardian, Alexis Petridis called Hill's vocal performance captivating and remarked that it overshadowed Santana's guitar work.

== Live performances ==
Hill included "To Zion" on the set list for her first solo concert tour, The Miseducation Tour (1999), performing the song while sitting on a classroom chair. The song's subject, then-19-month-old Zion David Marley, briefly accompanied her on stage during the performance at the CSU Convocation Center in Cleveland on March 21, 1999. Carlos Santana joined Hill to perform the song during the Bill Graham Civic Auditorium show in San Francisco on March 3; the two had earlier performed the song together at the 41st Annual Grammy Awards on February 24, 1999, where Hill won a record-breaking five Grammy Awards. (Note: Hill's record for most Grammy Awards won by a woman in a single night would be broken at the 52nd Annual Grammy Awards (2010), when Beyoncé won six.) Dean Van Nguyen from The Irish Times retrospectively hailed Hill's song choice for the ceremony as "brave", adding: "With legendary axe-man Carlos Santana caressing his acoustic guitar by her side, Hill delivered a cutting four-minute sermon on the pressures facing young women at pop music's top end."

Hill also included "To Zion" on the set list for the tour commemorating the 20th anniversary of The Miseducation of Lauryn Hill in 2018. In a review of the tour's Arena Birmingham stop for The Guardian, Kitty Empire criticized the tour guitarist for "destroy[ing] Carlos Santana's formerly lovely Spanish guitar intro" but praised Hill's vocal performance. During Hill's rendition of the song at ONE MusicFest in Atlanta on October 8, 2022, Marley surprised Hill on stage along with his two children. In 2023, Hill added the song to the set list for her tour commemorating the 25th anniversary of The Miseducation of Lauryn Hill, which was partly co-headlined with the Fugees as their reunion tour. Hill continued performing "To Zion" during the tour's 2024 European extension The Celebration Continues; on the set list, the song was followed by performances from Marley, who served as one of the tour's guest acts. Hill and Marley performed the song together at Hammonton's annual music and arts festival Beardfest in June 2025; Hill also joined Marley for the performance of his song "Marching", which incorporates sampled elements from "To Zion".

== Legacy ==
"That song is about the revelation that my son was to me. I had always made decisions for other people, making everybody else happy, and once I had him that was really the first decision that was unpopular for me. It was one that was based on my happiness and not what other people wanted for me or for themselves. And it was the best decision that I could have ever made, because I'm the happiest and healthiest that I have ever been. It also revealed to me which relationships were right, which ones were sincere, and which ones were based on exploiting and hurting me. It was a godsend all the way round – 360 degrees of that whole situation were nothing but a blessing. And I'm so happy that I made the choice that I did."

— Hill reflecting on "To Zion" and her pregnancy.

In an analysis of Hill's impact on contemporary culture for Time, Brandon Tensley credited "To Zion" with encouraging African-American female artists to express themselves more honestly through their works, stating: "This working through of raw emotions — this centering of the heart — has long been denied black women in the mainstream, including during the hostility-filled '90s, but it's treated seriously in Hill's work, and in part, it's what makes her extraordinarily transgressive as a lyricist." In her essay for The Westside Gazette, Carma Henry stated the song "beautifully paint[s] the portrait of the authentic experience of Black girlhood and the transition into womanhood".

The lyrical content of "To Zion" has also been attributed with influencing female celebrities to pursue motherhood simultaneously with their prosperous careers, with Justin Tinsley of Andscape enlisting tennis player Serena Williams and rapper Cardi B as prime examples. Similarly, David Opie from Highsnobiety described the song as "a call to arms for other expectant mothers who have faced similar pressures in the workplace", in reference to professional pressure placed on Hill to have an abortion, which is discussed in the lyrics. Actress Alexa Demie mentioned that she drew inspiration from "To Zion" for her role in the HBO drama series Euphoria.

Several critics have also acknowledged the influence "To Zion" has had on artistry of numerous rappers who achieved mainstream prominence throughout the decades after the song's release. Along with some other tracks from The Miseducation of Lauryn Hill, it has been credited with popularizing previously dismissed theological themes in mainstream hip-hop, with Opie noting: "Six years before Kanye would go on to walk with Jesus, Lauryn openly conversed with him on multiple tracks here, weaving various references to the Bible throughout." Kathy Iandoli shared those sentiments, writing: "Before Miseducation, the only way you could reference God was through identifying as one under the Nation of Gods and Earths. Anything else was taboo or theoretically corny." She further elaborated by indicating the impact Hill's religiously themed lyricism has had on rappers such as Lecrae and Chance the Rapper.

Vada Nobles stated in 2008 that he believed the drum roll on "To Zion" had inspired the aforementioned "Jesus Walks" (2004) by Kanye West. West referenced "To Zion" on his 2007 song "Champion", as evident in the lines: "Lauryn Hill say her heart was in Zion / I wish her heart still was in rhymin' / 'Cause who the kids gon' listen to, huh?". Furthermore, American rapper J. Cole sampled "To Zion" on his 2013 song "Can I Holla at Ya", while Zion Marley sampled the hook of "To Zion" for his 2025 song "Marching". In 2018, English singer Jessie Ware exalted "To Zion" and credited it for artistic guidance, explaining: "The song grows and grows and grows and becomes huge; it's almost overpowering. It's about a mother's love, but weirdly I felt like I could relate to it when I was 13 years old. It definitely made me think about how you put together a record".

== Track listings and formats ==
US promotional CD single

1. "To Zion" (radio edit) (featuring Carlos Santana) – 3:40
2. "To Zion" (album version) (featuring Carlos Santana) – 4:33
3. "To Zion" (instrumental) (featuring Carlos Santana) – 4:31
4. "To Zion" (callout hook #1) – 0:10
5. "To Zion" (callout hook #2) – 0:05

Japanese mini CD single

1. "To Zion" (album version) (featuring Carlos Santana) – 4:33
2. "To Zion" (instrumental) (featuring Carlos Santana) – 4:31

== Credits and personnel ==
Credits are adapted from the liner notes of The Miseducation of Lauryn Hill.

- Kenny Bobien – backing vocals
- Commissioner Gordon – engineering, mixing, mixing engineering
- Jared "Chocolate" Crawford – drums
- Che Guevara – production
- Lauryn Hill – arrangement, lead vocals, production, songwriting
- Ken Johnston – engineering assistance
- Sabrina Johnston – backing vocals
- Grace Paradise – harp
- James Poyser – synth bass
- Lenesha Randolph – backing vocals
- Warren Riker – engineering
- Earl Robinson – backing vocals
- Carlos Santana – lead guitar
- Jamie Seigel – mixing engineering assistance
- Andrea Simmons – backing vocals
- Eddie Stockley – backing vocals
- Johnny Wyndrx – engineering

== Charts ==
1999 weekly chart performance
Chart	Peak position
US Hot R&B/Hip-Hop Songs (Billboard)	77

== Certifications ==
Certifications and sales
Region	Certification	Certified units/sales
New Zealand (RMNZ)	Platinum	30,000^{‡}
^{‡} Sales+streaming figures based on certification alone.

== Release history ==
Release dates and formats
Region	Date	Format(s)	Label(s)	Ref.
Japan	November 18, 1998	Mini CD	Sony Japan	
United States	March 9, 1999	Contemporary hit radio; rhythmic contemporary radio	Ruffhouse; Columbia	
