= Miseducation =

Miseducation may refer to:

- The Mis-Education of the Negro, 1933 book by Carter G. Woodson
- The Miseducation of Lauryn Hill, 1998 album by Lauryn Hill
  - The Miseducation Tour, 1999 tour in support of the album
- The Miseducation of Ross O'Carroll-Kelly, 2000 novel by Paul Howard
- The Miseducation of Freddie Gibbs, 2009 mixtape by Freddie Gibbs
- The Miseducation of Cameron Post, 2012 novel by Emily M. Danforth
  - The Miseducation of Cameron Post, 2018 film based on the novel
- "The (Mis)Education of Liam Fergus Beircheart Gallagher", 2017 episode of Shameless
- The MisEducation of Bindu, 2019 film
- "The Miseducation of Lisa Simpson", 2020 episode of The Simpsons
