= The Miseducation of Lauryn Hill =

1998 studio album by Lauryn Hill

Studio album by Lauryn Hill
- Released: August 19, 1998
- Recorded: September 1997 – June 1998
- Studios: Chung King (New York); Circle House (Miami); The Hit Factory (New York); Metropolis (London); Perfect Pair (East Orange); Right Track (New York); RPM (New York); Sony (New York); Tuff Gong (Note: listed as Marley Music, Inc. in the liner notes) (Kingston)
- Genres: Neo soul; R&B; progressive rap
- Length: 77:17
- Labels: Ruffhouse; Columbia
- Producers: Lauryn Hill; Che Pope; Vada Nobles

Lauryn Hill chronology
The Miseducation of Lauryn Hill (1998)	MTV Unplugged No. 2.0 (2002)

Singles from The Miseducation of Lauryn Hill
- 1. "Doo Wop (That Thing)" Released: August 10, 1998; 2. "Ex-Factor" Released: December 14, 1998; 3. "Everything Is Everything" Released: May 3, 1999

The Miseducation of Lauryn Hill is the debut solo studio album by the American rapper and singer-songwriter Lauryn Hill. It was released on August 19, 1998, by Ruffhouse Records and Columbia Records. Recorded after Hill's band Fugees went on hiatus, the album is almost entirely written and produced by Hill. It is a concept album about educating oneself on love, with lyrical themes encompassing relationship complexities, interpersonal conflicts, motherhood, and faith. Predominantly a neo soul and R&B record, Miseducation also incorporates hip-hop, reggae, and soul, and features guest appearances from Carlos Santana, Mary J. Blige, and D'Angelo.

After touring with the Fugees, Hill became romantically involved with Jamaican entrepreneur Rohan Marley and became pregnant with their first child. The pregnancy, as well as other circumstances in her life, inspired Hill to create a solo album. Recording sessions for Miseducation took place from September 1997 to June 1998, initially in New York and New Jersey, before relocating to the Tuff Gong Studios in Kingston. There, Hill collaborated with a group of musicians known as New Ark to write and produce the songs. "Commissioner" Gordon Williams supervised the project, and Che Pope and James Poyser contributed to a majority of the tracks. Hill strived to differentiate her musical style from that of the Fugees, and wrote songs discussing the turmoil within the group. To avoid mainstream trends and an overproduced sound, live instrumentation was incorporated into the recordings.

The Miseducation of Lauryn Hill was met with universal critical acclaim, with most praise directed towards Hill's presentation of a woman's view on life and love, and her artistic range. A substantial commercial success, the album debuted atop the US Billboard 200, with first-week sales of 422,000 copies, the most for a woman at the time. At the 41st Annual Grammy Awards, it won Album of the Year and Best R&B Album, and Hill broke records for most nominations and wins at a single ceremony for a woman. Miseducation produced three singles—"Doo Wop (That Thing)", which peaked atop the US Billboard Hot 100 and broke numerous chart records; "Ex-Factor", and "Everything Is Everything". Hill promoted the record with multiple televised performances and The Miseducation Tour. New Ark, however, felt their contributions were not properly credited and filed a lawsuit, which was settled out of court in 2001.

Miseducation's success propelled Hill to global prominence, and contributed to bringing hip-hop and neo soul to the forefront of popular music. Critics have continued to exalt the album as one of the best of its era and of all time, and several artists have acknowledged its influence on their music. Miseducation was among the first batch of hip-hop albums selected for the Loeb Music Library. It has also been added to the Library of Congress' National Recording Registry, the Smithsonian, and inducted into the Grammy Hall of Fame. The album is among the best-selling of all time, with sales of 20 million copies worldwide. In the US, it is certified diamond for combined sales and album-equivalent units of 10 million. In 2018 and 2023, Hill embarked on anniversary tours to celebrate the album. The Miseducation remains Hill's only studio album.

== Background and development ==
"When some women are pregnant, their hair and their nails grow, but for me it was my mind and ability to create. I had the desire to write in a capacity that I hadn't done in a while. I don't know if it's a hormonal or emotional thing ... I was very in touch with my feelings at the time."

— Hill reflecting on her pregnancy reinvigorating her creativity.

In 1996, Lauryn Hill met Rohan Marley, son of Bob Marley, while touring as a member of the Fugees, in support of their widely successful second studio album The Score. Hill and Marley gradually formed a close relationship, and during the tour, Hill became pregnant with his child. After contributing to fellow Fugees member Wyclef Jean's solo debut The Carnival (1997), Hill refrained from touring and recording due to her pregnancy and cases of writer's block. However, circumstances in her life stimulated her to record a solo album, having already expressed the desire to do so and depart from the Fugees. She credited her pregnancy for rejuvenating her songwriting; according to her then-manager Jayson Jackson, the songwriting was prompted by Wendy Williams revealing Hill's pregnancy on her radio show and the intense media scrutiny over the identity of the child's father, as Hill had never publicized her relationship with Marley prior to the pregnancy.

Of the early writing process, Hill said: "Every time I got hurt, every time I was disappointed, every time I learned, I just wrote a song." While inspired, Hill wrote over 30 songs in her attic studio in South Orange, New Jersey. Many of these songs drew upon the turbulence in the Fugees, as well as past love experiences. In the summer of 1997, as Hill was due to give birth to her first child, she was requested to write a song for gospel musician CeCe Winans. Several months later, she went to Detroit to work with soul singer Aretha Franklin, writing and producing her single "A Rose Is Still a Rose". Franklin would later have Hill direct the song's music video. Shortly after this, Hill did songwriting work for Whitney Houston. Having written songs for artists in gospel, hip-hop, and R&B, she drew on these influences and experiences to record The Miseducation of Lauryn Hill.

== Recording and production ==
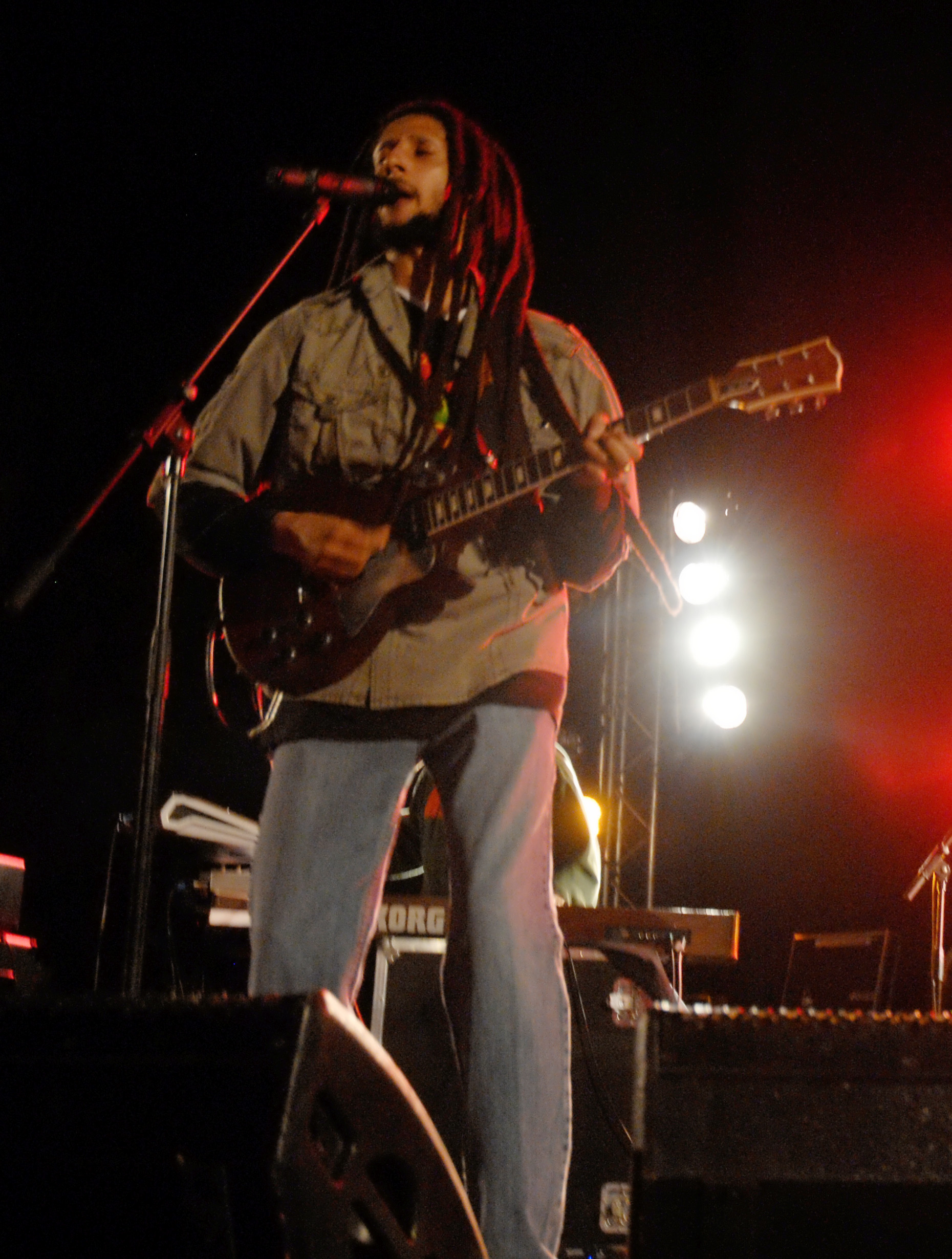
Julian Marley (pictured) was one of several members of Bob Marley's family who participated in the album's recording sessions in Jamaica.

Hill began recording The Miseducation of Lauryn Hill in September 1997 at the Chung King Studios in New York City. In an interview, Hill described the first day of recording: "The first day in the studio I ordered every instrument I ever fell in love with: harps, strings, timpani, organs, clarinets. It was my idea to record it so the human element stayed in. I didn't want it to be too technically perfect." Furthermore, she herself played the guitar on "Superstar". Gordon "Commissioner Gordon" Williams, who engineered most of the record, acted as the project supervisor. Initially, Wyclef Jean did not support Hill recording a solo album, but eventually offered to help as a producer, which she rejected. Columbia Records considered bringing in an outside producer for the album and had early talks with RZA of Wu-Tang Clan. However, Hill was adamant about writing, arranging, and producing the album herself, with Ruffhouse Records executive Chris Swartz ensuring her artistic freedom while recording the album.

To produce The Miseducation of Lauryn Hill, Hill formed a team of collaborators named New Ark, with programmer Vada Nobles, songwriter Rasheem Pugh, pianist Tejumold Newton, and guitarist Johari Newton. Two of the earliest recordings Hill and New Ark worked on—"Ex-Factor" and "Loved Real Hard Once", which was later retitled "When It Hurts So Bad"—were originally intended for other artists, before being retained due to their personal content. Che Pope was credited as a co-producer of "Lost Ones" and "To Zion", under his pseudonym Che Guevara. He revealed he produced "To Zion" in a small studio apartment in Brooklyn in 20 minutes, and Hill subsequently recorded it at Chung King and the Perfect Pair Studios in East Orange, New Jersey. John Legend, then an obscure artist, played the piano on "Everything Is Everything", which marked his commercial debut.

Throughout most of the initial sessions, Hill simultaneously recorded at multiple locations throughout New York City and New Jersey; even parts of a single song would be recorded at multiple studios. Furthermore, "Final Hour" was partly recorded at the Metropolis Studio in London. The majority of The Miseducation of Lauryn Hill, however, was recorded at Tuff Gong, the studio built by Bob Marley, in Kingston, Jamaica, where the album would be completed in June 1998. Regarding the shift in environment, Hill stated: "When I started recording in New York and New Jersey, lots of people were talking to me about going different routes. I could feel people up in my face, and I was picking up on bad vibes. I wanted a place where there was good vibes, where I was among family, and it was Tuff Gong." Numerous members of the Marley family were present in the studio during the recording sessions, among them Julian Marley, who contributed with guitar elements to "Forgive Them Father". In an interview, Williams recalled the recording of "Lost Ones", stating: "It was our first morning in Jamaica and I saw all of these kids gathered around Lauryn, screaming and dancing. Lauryn was in the living room next to the studio with about fifteen Marley grandchildren around her, the children of Ziggy, and Stephen, and Julian, and she starts singing this rap verse, and all the kids start repeating the last word of each line, chiming in very spontaneously because they were so into the song."

Hill also opted to avoid the digitally compressed, polished sound that had become standard in mainstream hip hop and R&B at the time of recording. The team made use of vintage Rupert Neve equipment and a hybrid mixture of analog 2-inch tape with 48-track digital machines to achieve a warm 1970s soul-like sound. Hill stated: "I wanna hear that thickness of sound. You can't get that from a computer, because a computer's too perfect."

=== Lawsuit ===
Though The Miseducation of Lauryn Hill was largely a collaborative work between Hill and New Ark, there was "label pressure to do the Prince thing", wherein all tracks would be credited as written and produced by the artist with little outside help. While recording the album, Hill was against the idea of creating documentation defining each musician's role. In November 1998, New Ark filed a 50-page lawsuit against Hill, her management and her record label, stating that Hill "used their songs and production skills, but failed to properly credit them for the work." New Ark demanded writing and/or production credits for 13 of the album's 14 tracks, excluding "To Zion", alongside monetary reimbursement. The musicians stated that they were primary songwriters of "Nothing Even Matters" and "Everything Is Everything", and major contributors on others.

Despite this, Williams described the project as a "powerfully personal effort by Hill ... It was definitely her vision." Audio engineer Tony Prendatt, who also worked on The Miseducation of Lauryn Hill, defended Hill, concluding that "Lauryn's genius is her own". In response to the lawsuit, Hill remarked that New Ark took advantage of her success. The lawsuit was eventually settled out of court in February 2001, for a reported $5 million. While Che Pope was not involved in the lawsuit, he disclosed that he solely produced "To Zion", despite being merely credited as a co-producer, and contemplated filing a lawsuit of his own but ultimately abandoned the idea.

== Musical style ==
"Nothing Even Matters"
Dramatic neo soul ballad "Nothing Even Matters", described as evocative of quiet storm, is a duet with R&B singer D'Angelo, who also plays the electric piano.

The Miseducation of Lauryn Hill is predominantly considered a neo soul and R&B album. (Note: attributed to multiple sources) Its musical style emerges from genres such as traditional soul, hip-hop, and reggae, and heavily utilizes live instruments and layered harmonies. According to the authors of Encyclopedia of African American Music (2010), although a substantial amount of tracks are based in hip-hop soul rather than neo soul, the musical style fuses hip-hop, R&B, and traditional soul against live instrumentations, and as such is constitutionally a work of neo soul. Meanwhile, Christopher John Farley and David E. Thigpen of Time identified the record's neo soul quality through its "unabashedly personal, unrelentingly confrontational, uncommonly inventive" characteristics. Hill eschewed evocations of the Fugees' artistry, endeavoring to create a record which would be inherently hers. She did not intend for the record's sound to be commercially appealing or overproduced, shunning Billboard chart trends in favor of 1960s–1970s influences from Aretha Franklin, Al Green, and Sam Cooke. Throughout the album, Hill maintains her signature rap-singing style. Responding to conflicted perceptions of its musical style, Hill told The Source: "I know this sounds crazy, but sometimes I treat rapping like singing, and other times I treat singing like rapping. But still, it's all done within the context of hip-hop". Biographer Chris Nickson accentuated Hill's vocal progression since The Score, both through the expansion of her range and her acquired musical versatility, specifically on "To Zion", "When It Hurts So Bad", and "The Miseducation of Lauryn Hill", which author Kathy Iandoli attributed to Hill's pregnancy.

"Lost Ones" fuses hip-hop with reggae, and is built on tight snares embellished with spirited toasting and scratching. Its hook interpolates Sister Nancy's "Bam Bam". 1960s-influenced soul track "Ex-Factor" received comparisons to Minnie Riperton and Aretha Franklin. It replays elements of Wu-Tang Clan's "Can It Be All So Simple", and ends with a guitar solo by Johari Newton. Carlos Santana plays rolling acoustic Spanish guitar licks in the background of hip-hop track "To Zion". Musically a "short trip through black music", "Doo Wop (That Thing)" fuses doo-wop harmonies, soul horns, contemporary hip-hop, and turntable work before transitioning into an R&B-styled chorus. Although a track intertwining R&B, hip-hop, and soul, "Superstar" contains an interpolation of the rock song "Light My Fire" by The Doors, against a percussion, harpsichord and harp-driven background. The flute-accompanied "Final Hour" blends jazz and hip-hop, while "When It Hurts So Bad" fuses roots reggae, traditional soul, and contemporary R&B. Another roots reggae-influenced track, "Forgive Them Father" is an interpretation of "Concrete Jungle" by Bob Marley and the Wailers. "Every Ghetto, Every City" is a funk track redolent of Stevie Wonder's "Living for the City", and replays elements of David Axelrod's "Tony Poem" and Steve "Silk" Hurley's "Jack Your Body". Neo soul ballad "Nothing Even Matters" is a collaboration with D'Angelo, who also plays the electric piano, interspersed with a guitar and Hammond organ. Similarly, the jazz-influenced titular track is built on the Hammond organ, piano, and strings. The Miseducation of Lauryn Hill concludes with two hidden tracks—a cover of Frankie Valli's "Can't Take My Eyes Off You", which merges 1960s soul with contemporary hip hop and incorporates beatboxing, and the fingerstyle guitar-driven "Tell Him".

== Lyrical themes ==
"Lost Ones"
On "Lost Ones", Hill chastises her former bandmates, record-label executives and critics. She forcefully raps hardcore verses in a Caribbean patois, before shifting into a refrain that features backup singing vocals.

"To Zion"
"To Zion" is an emotional tribute to Hill's infant son. She serenades her son Zion with a lullaby detailing the professional pressure placed on her to have an abortion, speaking with blunt candour on contemplating whether or not to have her child.

The Miseducation of Lauryn Hill is lyrically a concept album about educating oneself on love. In reference to the theme, Hill originally wanted to title the album after Sonny Carson's autobiographical novel The Education of Sonny Carson and its 1974 film adaptation. However, her collaborators urged a more "self-deprecating" title, inspired by Carter G. Woodson's 1933 book The Mis-Education of the Negro, hence devising the title The Miseducation of Lauryn Hill. In a retrospective analysis, Pitchfork writer Carvell Wallace observed Hill educating herself on love of God through love of her child on "To Zion", love of others and its nuisances on "When It Hurts So Bad", and ultimately love of self on the titular track. The complex themes prompted multiple critics to characterize the album as a progressive rap work. Throughout the record, several interludes of a teacher, speaking to what is implied to be a classroom of children, are played. The teacher was portrayed by American poet and politician Ras Baraka, who was recorded speaking to a group of children in the living room of Hill's New Jersey home. Hill requested that Baraka speak to the children about the concept of love, to which he improvised in the lecture. Regarding the influence of The Mis-Education of the Negro, Hill "adopts Woodson's thesis and makes it part of her own artistic process. Like the songs themselves, the intro/outro classroom scenes suggest a larger community working to redefine itself", according to Paul Schrodt of Slant Magazine. On the spoken-word intro, Baraka portrays the teacher taking attendance, with Hill as the sole student absent from the class, in reference to the album's title.

Tracks such as "Lost Ones", "Superstar", and "Forgive Them Father" were widely speculated to be direct attacks at fellow Fugees members Jean and Pras. Though mostly in English, "Lost Ones" and "Forgive Them Father" both feature singing and rapping in patois, the common dialect in Jamaica. While "Lost Ones" discusses the dissolution of Hill's business relationship with Jean, "Ex-Factor" addresses the end of their personal one. "When It Hurts So Bad" details anguish caused by unrequited love, while "I Used to Love Him" follows the protagonist who is now dispassionately reflecting on the concluded relationship in a self-critical manner. Nickson noted a narrative constructed through the track order of The Miseducation of Lauryn Hill, calling "I Used to Love Him" thematically a logical successor to "When It Hurts So Bad", while the idea of asking God for forgiveness on "Forgive Them Father" flowed "quite naturally" from "I Used to Love Him". Although a large portion of love songs would turn out to be bitter from Hill's previous relationship, "Nothing Even Matters" showcased a brighter, more intimate perspective on the subject. It was inspired by Hill's relationship with Rohan Marley. Speaking about its lyrics, she remarked: "I wanted to make a love song, á la Roberta Flack & Donny Hathaway, and give people a humanistic approach to love again without all the physicality and overt sexuality." An optimistic view on love is also offered on the hidden track "Can't Take My Eyes Off You".

Hill aimed to convey various adversities, particularly those of African Americans, through the lyrical themes of The Miseducation of Lauryn Hill. "Doo Wop (That Thing)" highlights conflicting views between Black women and men, advising women to value themselves by not engaging in relationships with deceitful men, or succumbing to superficial trends, while criticizing men attempting to portray a false lifestyle of affluence and power while avoiding responsibility. On "Every Ghetto, Every City", Hill reminisces about her childhood in New Jersey. "Everything Is Everything" discusses life changes, and expresses dissatisfaction with adult cynicism prevailing over adolescent idealism. The album's titular track encourages self-examination and pursuit of one's individual destiny, branding traditional education insufficient. Furthermore, Hill revealed that she frequently read the Bible, from which she sought inspiration for the album's gospel-oriented lyricism. Biblical allusions are present on "Final Hour", which cautions against hedonistic overindulgence and instead advocates focusing on one's fate in the afterlife, and "Forgive Them Father", which warns of individuals with hidden agendas and asks God to forgive them. "Lost Ones" also incorporates spiritual themes, centering on the concept of karma. Among the more introspective tracks, "To Zion" reflected Hill prioritizing family over her career, and her decision to have her first child, even though many at the time encouraged her to terminate the pregnancy, so as not to conflict with her burgeoning career. Similarly, Nickson recognized the closing hidden track "Tell Him" as "a prayer that was sung, almost a hymn", and furtherly as a dedication to God, to Hill's son Zion David, and to Rohan Marley.

== Marketing ==
=== Imagery ===
Having already established himself as a viable art director at Sony Music, Erwin Gorostiza was selected to manage art direction for The Miseducation of Lauryn Hill. As he concluded Hill was involved with her imagery more than any other artist he had previously worked with, he insisted she be given the art direction credit equal to his. Gorostiza soon enlisted photographer Eric Johnson for the album's accompanying artwork. Hill decided to set the photo shoot at the Columbia High School, her alma mater, to go along with the album's title and concept. While there were numerous images photographed inside a classroom, a hallway, a lavatory, and a school bus, a close-up image of Hill was chosen to be retouched, to look as if it was carved into a wooden desk, for the album cover. The cover has been included on numerous lists of best hip-hop and R&B album covers ever. (Note: attributed to multiple sources) The high school theme was maintained in the promotional televised teasers for the album, which featured voice-overs by Joan Baker.

The marketing strategy for The Miseducation of Lauryn Hill was highly concentrated on print media, with Hill appearing on the covers of Details, Essence, GQ, Harper's Bazaar, Honey, Interview, The New York Times Magazine, Rolling Stone, The Source, Teen People, Time, and Vibe. Hill's publicist Miguel Baguer pushed fashion magazines to recognize Hill as "a cultural disruptor and a cover girl". Hill was also invested in her styling for the covers, envisioning gold-sprayed locks for the Details cover, as she and her styling team "didn't succumb to mainstream's definition of beauty". CR Fashion Book editor Faith Brown retrospectively remarked that Hill established herself as a fashion icon during the promotional cycle of The Miseducation of Lauryn Hill.

Tamara Palmer wrote for The Recording Academy that the "masterful" accompanying music videos for the album's singles "showed Hill as a woman who transcends the ages". "Doo Wop (That Thing)" featured a split screen showing a block party in Washington Heights; the left side displayed the party set in 1967, with Hill wearing a 1960s-inspired wig and a zebra-striped dress, while the right side showed the party set in 1998. The video went on to win four MTV Video Music Awards in 1999, including Video of the Year, becoming the first hip-hop music video to win the award. "Ex-Factor" first pictures Hill in a light room, wearing white clothing, before transitioning into black and blue-tinged nightclub scenery, while "Everything Is Everything" shows Hill walking around New York City, which is depicted as spinning around on an enormous phonograph. The latter was nominated for Best Short Form Music Video at the 42nd Annual Grammy Awards.

=== Release and promotion ===
The Miseducation of Lauryn Hill was first released in Japan on August 19, 1998, before being released in the US on August 25, and elsewhere throughout the following month. To commence its pre-release marketing campaign, Ruffhouse Records mailed a promotional vinyl of "Lost Ones" to select radio stations; the song managed to garner enough airplay to reach number 27 on the US R&B/Hip-Hop Airplay. "Can't Take My Eyes Off You"—which originally appeared in the 1997 film Conspiracy Theory—began receiving heavy unsolicited airplay, prompting it to reach the top 40 on the US Hot 100 Airplay; consequently, the song was added on The Miseducation of Lauryn Hill as a hidden track. "Doo Wop (That Thing)" was then released as the album's official lead single on August 10, 1998, debuting atop the US Billboard Hot 100 and breaking numerous chart records. (Note: "Doo Wop (That Thing)" marked: the first Billboard Hot 100 number-one single by a female rapper, the first solo hip hop song to debut atop the Billboard Hot 100, the first debut single to debut atop the Billboard Hot 100, the rap song with largest radio airplay, and the longest-running Billboard Hot 100 number-one single by a female rapper, until 2017.) Stephanie Gayle, senior director of marketing at Columbia Records, retrospectively analyzed: "'Lost Ones' set the tone for how Lauryn the solo artist would be embraced at Black radio (and anywhere hip-hop was being played). But 'Doo Wop (That Thing)' told the world there was nowhere this young lady of color would not be heard."

Hill further promoted The Miseducation of Lauryn Hill with televised performances on Saturday Night Live and at the Billboard Music Awards in December. "Ex-Factor" was released as the second single on December 14, but failed to replicate the success of its predecessor, peaking at number 21 on the Billboard Hot 100, while reaching the top five in Iceland and the UK. Meanwhile, "To Zion" had been released as a promotional single in November, and would be performed with Carlos Santana at the 41st Annual Grammy Awards on February 24, 1999. "The Miseducation of Lauryn Hill" was also released as a promotional single, exclusively in Japan, in March. "Everything Is Everything" was released as the third and final single on May 3, peaking at number 35 on the Billboard Hot 100. Hill performed the song alongside "Lost Ones" at the 1999 MTV Video Music Awards on September 9. Furthermore, she performed "Final Hour" at The Source Hip-Hop Music Awards on August 18.

== Touring ==
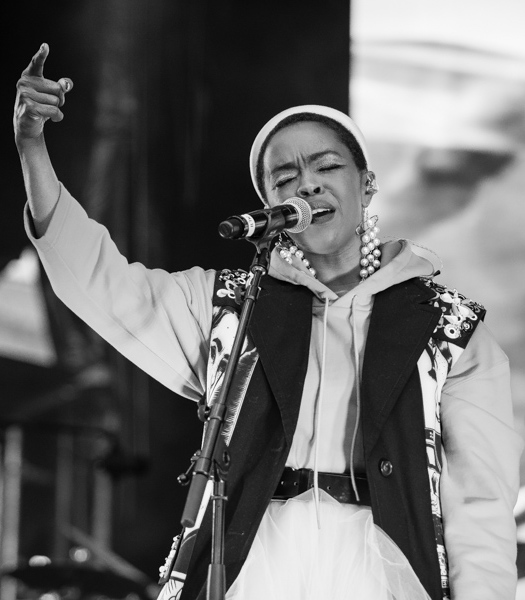
Hill performing during The Miseducation of Lauryn Hill 20th Anniversary Tour in 2019

Initially, there was no immediate tour planned in support of The Miseducation of Lauryn Hill, due to the album not needing further promotion and Hill being pregnant with her second child Selah. However, shortly after giving birth in November 1998, Hill recruited a band and began rehearsals for what would become The Miseducation Tour. The tour featured Outkast, Busta Rhymes, and the Roots as opening acts. Italian luxury brand Armani and American clothing brand Levi Strauss & Co. co-sponsored the tour. Most tickets sold out as soon as the tour was announced, including three sold-out nights at The Theater at Madison Square Garden. The tour received widespread critical acclaim, predominantly directed towards Hill's vocal performance and stage presence. (Note: attributed to multiple sources)

The Miseducation Tour commenced at the Nippon Budokan in Tokyo on January 21, 1999, which was followed by three more concerts in Japan and one at the Brixton Academy in London, on February 5. The 20-date first US leg of the tour began on February 18 in Detroit, and ended on April 1 in Hill's hometown of Newark. Hill started the tour's European leg on May 13, when she performed at the Oslo Spektrum in Norway, ending the leg on June 2 at the Manchester Arena in England. Hill would then embark on a second North American leg between June 30 and August 15. Despite the possibility of the tour being extended, Hill ceased touring following the summer 1999 shows due to obligations to her family and the difficulties she had experienced touring with the Fugees in 1996, which she found desensitizing and isolating. Los Angeles Times called the tour "quite possibly the most accomplished tour ever by a hip-hop artist" at the time, while Keith Murphy of Andscape retrospectively declared it the greatest female hip-hop tour of all time.

=== Anniversary tours ===
Though Hill had toured extensively in support of The Miseducation of Lauryn Hill, she had not performed the album live in its entirety until August 2011, 13 years after its release, when she co-headlined the annual hip-hop festival Rock the Bells. Her performances were met with a mixed reception, with reviewers criticizing her alterations of the songs' arrangements. Hill continued changing arrangements and tempos of the tracks in subsequent concerts, elaborating: "There's no way I could continue to play the same songs over and over as long as I've been performing them without some variation and exploration". Speculation arose over Hill being prohibited from performing original versions in the aftermath of New Ark's lawsuit against her, which she refuted.

In April 2018, Hill announced The Miseducation of Lauryn Hill 20th Anniversary Tour, subsequently announcing a rotating line-up of guest performers, including original tour's opening acts Big Boi and Busta Rhymes, in addition to Nas, Dave Chappelle, M.I.A., Santigold, ASAP Rocky, SZA, De La Soul, Talib Kweli, and Shabazz Palaces. The tour's first North American leg commenced in Boston on July 11, and finished in St. Louis on October 5. A European leg started in Brussels, Belgium on November 18, and ended in Stockholm, Sweden on December 10. The tour was extended into Oceania, Africa, and South America throughout 2019, after which Hill toured various festival concerts across North America and Europe until September 2019. (Note: attributed to multiple sources) The tour received plaudits for its set list, as well as for Hill's performance skills, but elicited criticism over alterations of the songs' arrangements and Hill's frequent tardiness to shows. (Note: attributed to multiple sources)

In August 2023, Hill announced The Miseducation of Lauryn Hill 25th Anniversary Tour, with initial dates spanning from September 8 to November 9, 2023, throughout North America and Oceania. With the Fugees as the opening act for the North American dates, the tour also served as the group's reunion tour. In October, Hill announced 10 additional shows, which were soon postponed due to a vocal strain. In June 2024, the remainder of the tour was announced as The Celebration Continues Tour, which would be co-headlined with the Fugees to honor The Score in addition to The Miseducation of Lauryn Hill, with Hill's son YG Marley as a special guest. Upon the announcement, Hill and Marley performed together on The Tonight Show Starring Jimmy Fallon and at the BET Awards 2024. The tour was originally set to resume in Miami on August 9, 2024, with a European leg immediately announced. However, on August 7, Hill issued a statement elaborating the abrupt cancellation of the North American leg the previous day, citing low ticket sales, which she attributed to media sensationalism over the November 2023 tour postponement. The European leg proceeded as planned, commencing in Dublin on October 7, 2024, and culminating in Hamburg on November 1.

== Critical reception ==
=== Initial response ===
Professional ratings
Review scores
Source	Rating
Entertainment Weekly	A
The Guardian	5/5 stars
Melody Maker	4/5 stars
Muzik	5/5 stars
NME	8/10
Pitchfork	8.0/10
Q	4/5 stars
Rolling Stone	4/5 stars
Spin	9/10
USA Today	4/4 stars

On release, The Miseducation of Lauryn Hill was met with widespread critical acclaim. According to Los Angeles Times journalist Geoff Boucher, it was the most acclaimed album of 1998, with reviewers frequently praising Hill's presentation of a woman's perspective on life and love. Hill's multifaceted skills elicited particular praise; Eric Weisbard from Spin called her a "genre-bender", commending her layered vocals and proficient rapping displayed against vulnerable and sentimental lyrical themes. Similarly, NME's John Mulvey regarded the album as a "document of triumph" with "astounding" lyrical and musical range; both Mulvey and Dream Hampton in The Village Voice emphasized Hill's assertive involvement in the record's creation. Writer Selwyn Seyfu Hinds described the album as possessive of a "distinctive and potent triple threat: sound, style, and steel", referring to its live instrument-driven musicality, Hill's fusion of rapping and singing, and lyricism, respectively. Chicago Tribune critic Greg Kot deemed the record a "vocal tour de force" with arrangements which "bristle with great ideas".

Progressive rap-oriented themes of The Miseducation of Lauryn Hill also elicited acclaim. The Village Voice's senior editor Robert Christgau and The Sydney Morning Herald's Bernard Zuel accentuated the knowledge and moral authority Hill exhibited through the album's comprehensive lyricism, while Paul Verna of Billboard hailed the record as "groundbreaking" for female rappers as Hill offered "much-needed societal lessons". In The New York Times, Ann Powers found it exceptional for Hill to use her faith, based "more in experience and feeling than in doctrine", as a means of connecting "the sacred to the secular in music that touches the essence of soul." An editor of XXL wrote that The Miseducation of Lauryn Hill "not only verifies [Hill] as the most exciting voice of a young, progressive hip-hop nation, it raises the standards for it"; the album was the first ever to receive an XXL rating. In Entertainment Weekly, David Browne further declared the record one of the "rare" hip-hop soul albums not to lose focus with frivolous guest appearances.

In less laudatory reviews, critics were ambivalent towards the balladry and interludes on The Miseducation of Lauryn Hill. (Note: attributed to multiple sources) Pitchfork's Neil Lieberman found some of the ballads tedious and the melodies "cheesy", while Mulvey and Christgau dismissed the interludes as redundant. Citing "Lost Ones" and "Superstar" as highlights, Christgau further deemed the album the "PC record of the year" featuring exceptionally understated production and skillful rapping but also inconsistent lyrics and average singing. Writing for Q, Dom Phillips felt the record's sole flaw was "a lack of memorable melody", citing "Superstar" as an exception. In the Los Angeles Times, Soren Baker believed Hill was more effective as a critical rapper than a singer on the more emotional songs, where her voice was "too thin to carry such heavy subject matter". Tim Perlich of Now was also critical of Hill's vocal performance, particularly her tendency to "excessively bend and stretch notes", but nonetheless positively compared her vocal skills to other R&B artists.

=== Retrospective commentary ===
Professional ratings
Review scores
Source	Rating
AllMusic	5/5 stars
Anthony Fantano	10/10
Christgau's Consumer Guide	(3-star Honorable Mention)
The Encyclopedia of Popular Music	4/5 stars
The Great Rock Discography	9/10 stars
Pitchfork	9.5/10
The Rolling Stone Album Guide	4.5/5 stars
Slant Magazine	4.5/5 stars
Tom Hull	B+
XXL	5/5

Critical acclaim for The Miseducation of Lauryn Hill persevered with retrospective commentaries. Multiple critics accentuated its introduction of introspection and vulnerability to hip-hop lyricism, while Kelefa Sanneh heralded it as "the high-water mark" of the conscious hip-hop movement. AllMusic's John Bush was impressed by Hill designing the album "not as a crossover record, but as a collection of overtly personal and political statements", while demonstrating both vocal and songwriting competence. Emphasizing its educational quality in the context of African-American history, Che Grayson of Teen Vogue wrote: "The American school system gave me the tools to build the master's house; The Mis-Education of Lauryn Hill gave me the tools to destroy it."

The Miseducation of Lauryn Hill has also been analyzed as a work of Black feminism, with journalist Kitty Empire calling it a "game-changing cri de coeur", proclaiming that it "channelled some precious learning for a generation or more of young women, black and white alike; one in which a ferociously talented artist preached self-determination and self-respect, self-knowledge and getting one's due". Salon's Nardos Haile reflected on Hill confronting misunderstandings between Black women and men in regard to money, sex, and power—themes predominant in hip-hop lyricism of the 1990s—and praised her for authentically depicting the coming of age experiences for Black women. Sharing those sentiments, Savannah Taylor of Ebony further elaborated that the album was "more than a representation of a coming of age per the tag of feminism; it was a realization of self in the midst of the world's dictation of how a Black woman should be".

The Miseducation of Lauryn Hill has also received significant plaudits for its broad appeal; in The Rough Guide to Rock (2003), author Peter Buckley hailed the album as the "ultimate cross-over album of the hip-hop era". Critics Piero Scaruffi and Colin Larkin lauded the record's versatile musicality and Hill's vocal performance, with Scaruffi adding: "Elegant and sincere, Hill exposes her street persona and attains universality with her simple stories of girlhood." Writing in The Rolling Stone Album Guide (2004), Jon Caramanica called the record "as earnest, unpretentious, and pleasantly sloppy an album as any woman of the hip-hop generation has ever made", crediting it with accomplishing filtering hip-hop through a "womanist lens", hence appealing to a wider spectrum of listeners. Similarly, Lloyd Bradley of BBC emphasized its "astuteness and sensitivity disproving the notion that hip hop audiences have only two speeds – radical or licentious", adding that it introduced the stylings of singers-songwriters Carly Simon and Joni Mitchell to music of the 21st century. Including the album in their 2003 listing The 500 Greatest Albums of All Time, Rolling Stone credited Hill with retrieving 1970s soul and popularizing it within the hip-hop culture. In the listing's 2020 edition, where the album appeared as the highest-ranking hip-hop album and 10th overall, the magazine praised its displays of the commercial appeal of a "rawer" sound at a time "when pop was becoming increasingly slick and digitized in the go-go Nineties".

== Accolades ==
=== Awards and honors ===
The Miseducation of Lauryn Hill was nominated for myriad industry awards, winning most of its nominations. At the 1998 Billboard Music Awards, the album won R&B Album of the Year, based on its performance on the Billboard charts. Hill was among the biggest winners at the 1999 NAACP Image Awards with four awards, including Outstanding Album for The Miseducation of Lauryn Hill, and the President's Award for "special achievement in furthering the cause of civil rights and public service". Hill's 10 nominations at the 41st Annual Grammy Awards marked the most Grammy Award nominations in a single ceremony for a woman. Winning five awards, Hill became the female artist with most wins in a single ceremony. (Note: Hill's record would be broken at the 52nd Annual Grammy Awards (2010), when Beyoncé won six.) Among the awards was Album of the Year for The Miseducation of Lauryn Hill, which marked the first time a hip-hop artist won the award. The album also won Best R&B Album, while Hill won Best New Artist. Hill was the most awarded artist at the 1999 Soul Train Music Awards as well, winning four awards, including Best R&B/Soul or Rap Album of the Year and Best R&B/Soul Album – Female for The Miseducation of Lauryn Hill. The album subsequently won the Source Hip-Hop Music Award and the Soul Train Lady of Soul Award, both for Album of the Year. At the American Music Awards of 2000, Hill won Favorite Soul/R&B Female Artist, while The Miseducation of Lauryn Hill won Favorite Soul/R&B Album. Internationally, the album was nominated for Best Album at the 1999 MTV Europe Music Awards, and International Album of the Year at the inaugural NRJ Music Awards (2000).

The Miseducation of Lauryn Hill was declared "culturally, historically, or aesthetically significant" by the Library of Congress, and selected for inclusion in the 2014 class of the National Recording Registry, becoming the first female rap recording to enter the National Recording Registry. In 2017, producer and professor 9th Wonder selected the album for the first batch of hip-hop albums to be preserved in Harvard University's Loeb Music Library. The album has also been collected by Smithsonian Institution's National Museum of African American History and Culture (NMAAHC), while The Recording Academy inducted it into the 2024 class of the Grammy Hall of Fame.

=== Listings ===
Critical listings
Year	Publication	List	Position	Ref.
1998	Billboard	Critics' Choice	1	
1998	Rolling Stone	Albums of the Year	1	
1998	Spin	The 20 Best Albums of 1998	1	
1998	Time	The Best of 1998 Music	1	
1998	The Village Voice	Pazz & Jop	2	
1999	Ego Trip	Hip Hop's Greatest Albums by Year: 1998	4	
1999	Q	The 90 Best Albums of the 90s	—	
1999	Rolling Stone	The Essential Recordings of the '90s	—	
1999	Spin	The Greatest Albums of the '90s	28	
2000	Vanity Fair	Elvis Costello's 500 Essential Albums	—	
2001	VH1	Top 100 Rock 'n' Roll Albums	37	
2002	Blender	The 100 Greatest American Albums of All Time	75	
2002	Rolling Stone	Women in Rock: The 50 Essential Albums	32	
2003	Blender	500 CDs You Must Own Before You Die	—	
2003	Q	Top 100 Albums Ever	20	
2003	Rolling Stone	The 500 Greatest Albums of All Time	312	
2004	Helsingin Sanomat	50th Anniversary of Rock	—	
2004	Vibe	51 Essential Albums	—	
2005	Spin	100 Greatest Albums 1985–2005	49	
2006	Hip-Hop Connection	The 100 Greatest Rap Albums 1995–2005	39	
2007	The Guardian	1000 Albums to Hear Before You Die	—	
2007	Mojo	The Mojo Collection	—	
2007	Rock and Roll Hall of Fame	Definitive 200	55	
2007	Vibe	150 Albums That Define the Vibe Era	—	
2008	1,000 Recordings to Hear Before You Die		—	
2008	About.com	100 Greatest Hip-Hop Albums	43	
2008	About.com	Best Rap Albums of 1998	1	
2008	Entertainment Weekly	The 100 Best Albums from 1983 to 2008	2	
2010	1001 Albums You Must Hear Before You Die		—	
2011	Rolling Stone	100 Best Albums of the '90s	5	
2011	Slant Magazine	The 100 Best Albums of the 1990s	24	
2013	NME	The 500 Greatest Albums of All Time	89	
2017	NPR	The 150 Greatest Albums Made by Women (Note: The 2017 listing was determined by editors of NPR, while the 2018 listing was based on a readers' poll.)	2	
2018	NPR	The 150 Greatest Albums Made by Women	3	
2018	Pitchfork	The 50 Best Albums of 1998	2	
2020	Entertainment Weekly	30 Essential Albums from the Last 30 Years	10	
2020	The Independent	40 Essential Albums to Hear Before You Die	—	
2020	Paste	The 90 Best Albums of the 1990s	16	
2020	Rolling Stone	The 500 Greatest Albums of All Time	10	
2021	Pitchfork	The 200 Best Albums of the Last 25 Years (Note: readers' poll)	50	
2022	Consequence	The 100 Greatest Albums of All Time	11	
2022	Pitchfork	The 150 Best Albums of the 1990s	2	
2023	American Songwriter	5 Pioneering Hip-Hop Albums That Revolutionized Rap Music	—	
2023	Consequence	50 Best Hip-Hop Albums of All Time	2	
2023	British GQ	The Best R&B Albums of All Time	1	
2023	The Recording Academy	10 Essential Albums by Female Rappers	—	
2024	Apple Music	100 Best Albums	1	
2024	Billboard	The 100 Greatest Rap Albums of All Time	3	
2024	Paste	The 300 Greatest Albums of All Time	28	

== Commercial performance ==
In the US, The Miseducation of Lauryn Hill debuted atop the Billboard 200 chart dated September 12, 1998, becoming the first number-one album by an unaccompanied female rapper on the chart. It also became the first debut album by a woman to debut atop the Billboard 200, which made Hill the first artist to debut atop both the Billboard 200 and Billboard Hot 100 with the first entries. Selling 422,624 copies in its first week, the album broke the record for largest first-week sales for an album recorded by a woman; (Note: Before Hill, the record was held by Madonna's Ray of Light (1998).) the first-week sales are also the highest for a debut album released by a woman in the 20th century, and the highest for a female rapper ever. In its second week, the album remained at the summit, selling 265,000 copies, and was certified gold by the Recording Industry Association of America (RIAA) for surpassing 500,000 units sold in the country. It stayed atop the chart in its third week, before descending to number two, and returning to the top in its fifth week. By late October, it had spent nearly two consecutive months within the top three. The album's chart stability was considered rare for a hip-hop release at the time, since most high-debuting hip-hop albums would quickly plummet.

The Miseducation of Lauryn Hill had sold 2.9 million units in the US by December 1998, becoming one of the best-selling albums of the year, and topping the year-end Top R&B/Hip-Hop Albums. Sales increased after the 41st Annual Grammy Awards, as it sold 234,000 copies during the week of March 3, 1999, and 200,000 copies the following week. The album spent a total of 92 weeks on the Billboard 200, being the longest-charting debut album by a female rapper until it was surpassed by Cardi B's Invasion of Privacy (2018). The Miseducation of Lauryn Hill remains the only rap album by a woman to spend multiple weeks at number one, and one of the longest-running number-one rap albums ever on the Billboard 200. In February 2021, the album was certified diamond by the RIAA, denoting combined sales and album-equivalent units of 10 million in the US; Hill thus became the first female rapper to receive a RIAA diamond certification.

In Canada, The Miseducation of Lauryn Hill prematurely debuted at number 16 on the Canadian Albums Chart dated September 12, 1998, and peaked atop the chart following its official release in the country. By August 1999, it had sold 700,000 units in the country, being certified septuple platinum. In the UK, the album debuted and peaked at number two on the UK Albums Chart, while debuting atop the UK R&B Albums Chart, where it spent 18 non-consecutive weeks at the summit. In 2022, it was certified quadruple platinum by the British Phonographic Industry (BPI), denoting album-equivalent units of 1,200,000. As of October 2023, the album is among the 20 most streamed albums of the 1990s in the country. In Ireland, The Miseducation of Lauryn Hill became the first rap album to reach number one on the Irish Albums Chart. Across Europe, it reached the top 10 in Austria, Belgium, France, Germany, Greece, Italy, Norway, and Sweden, as well as number two on the European Top 100 Albums. The International Federation of the Phonographic Industry (IFPI) certified the album double platinum, for sales of two million copies in Europe, in 1999.

In Japan, The Miseducation of Lauryn Hill peaked at number six on the Oricon Albums Chart, and was certified million by the Recording Industry Association of Japan (RIAJ) in September 1999. In Australia, the album was a sleeper hit, debuting at number 47 and peaking at number two in its 23rd week; it was certified double platinum by the Australian Recording Industry Association (ARIA) in 2019, denoting units of 140,000. In New Zealand, the album peaked at number five, and was certified triple platinum for shipments of 45,000 units. Within its first year, The Miseducation of Lauryn Hill sold 10 million copies worldwide, having sold over 20 million by its 20th anniversary, (Note: attributed to multiple sources) when it was also confirmed as the most streamed 1998 album on Spotify. In addition to being one of the best-selling albums of all time, it is also the best-selling neo soul album and the best-selling album by a female rapper ever.

== Legacy ==
=== Impact ===
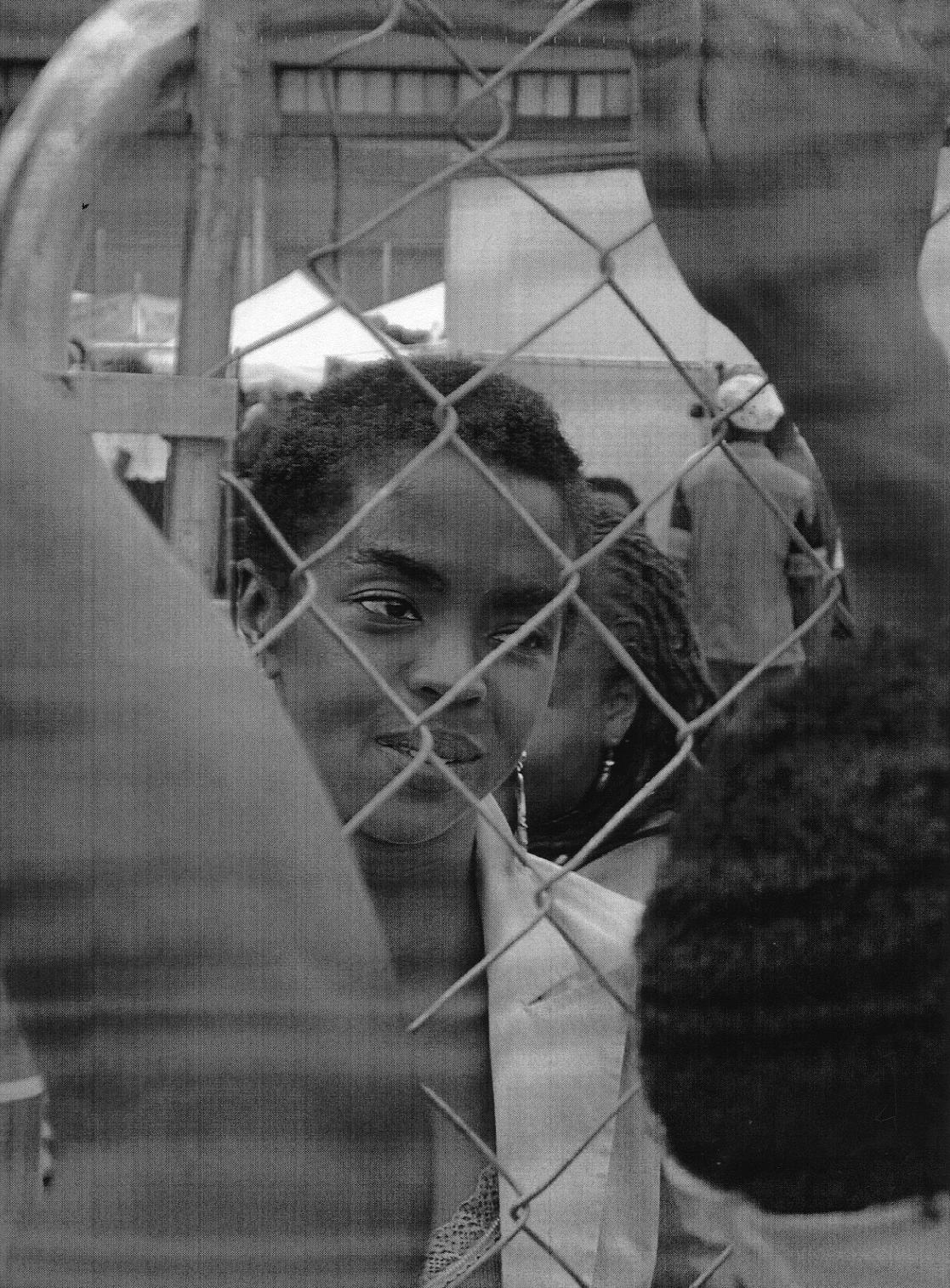
Hill in 2005

The Miseducation of Lauryn Hill is widely credited with bringing hip-hop and neo soul to the forefront of mainstream music. In The New York Times, Danyel Smith stated that The Miseducation of Lauryn Hill "dragged rap back to the land of the living" after the twin drive-by murders of Tupac Shakur and Notorious B.I.G. When Hill appeared on the cover of the February 8, 1999 issue of Time, she became the first rapper to do so. Later that month, Hill broke a multitude of records at the 41st Annual Grammy Awards, winning Album of the Year—often recognized as the most prestigious award in the music industry—for The Miseducation of Lauryn Hill, among other awards. According to music executive Clive Davis, the win helped the Grammy Awards become more accepting of rap and hip-hop music, while Amazon's former senior music editor Pete Hilgendorf stated the win marked the start of "the progression of R&B moving into hip-hop". Along with Brown Sugar (1995) by D'Angelo, Maxwell's Urban Hang Suite (1996) by Maxwell, and Baduizm (1997) by Erykah Badu, The Miseducation of Lauryn Hill is considered to be one of the most important and definitive records in the history of neo soul; according to the Encyclopedia of African American Music, it is the genre's most critically acclaimed and popular album.

Following the success of The Miseducation of Lauryn Hill, Hill rose to international prominence and established herself as a pioneering woman in hip-hop, as well as a "quadruple threat"—a successful rapper, singer, songwriter and producer. As early as March 1999, she was described as a hip-hop icon in Jet. Brandon Tensley of Time remarked that she achieved the icon status through the impact of The Miseducation of Lauryn Hill alone. However, the record remains Hill's only studio album as of 2025. After its success, she shunned her celebrity status and pursued a private life, raising six children, but both personal and professional difficulties followed. As Miami New Times reporter Juliana Accioly explained, Hill was reported to have spent years on a "spiritual quest while dealing with bipolar disorder. She was sued over songwriting credits. She served a three-month prison sentence in 2013 for tax evasion. She was deemed a diva for wanting to be called 'Ms. Hill' and criticized for her erratic performances." Live album MTV Unplugged No. 2.0, released in May 2002 to critical polarity, remains Hill's sole full-length effort since The Miseducation of Lauryn Hill. In 2021, Hill revealed that she had never released another album due to Columbia Records not offering her adequate support in producing it, and due to fearing jeopardizing her artistic authenticity by continuing to record for the label.

=== Influence ===
The Miseducation of Lauryn Hill is considered one of hip-hop's most influential records. It has been widely credited with redefining hip-hop, which had been established as a male-dominated genre with lyricism based on violence, materialism, and misogyny, according to Candace McDuffie of Vibe. Radio personality Ed Lover agreed, adding that it offered a different perspective from other women in hip-hop, who generally rapped about sexual themes or being "rugged", while rapper Redman emphasized its empowerment of women and compared Hill's lyrical impact to Martin Luther King Jr. Chris Mench of Complex wrote that the album set a new creative standard for female rappers, and for hip-hop artists altogether, while David Opie of Highsnobiety declared that it had "educated pretty much everyone" who has recorded music since its release; both critics noted its influence extending beyond the context of hip-hop. Similarly, while reviewing The Miseducation of Lauryn Hill for XXL, upon the album's 15th anniversary, Nas hailed it as a "timeless" model for artists of all genres to follow, adding that it represented "a serious moment in Black music, when young artists were taking charge and breaking through doors." Jay-Z also emphasized the record's timeless quality, while Cyndi Lauper credited it with changing phrasing and uniting hip-hop and gospel. The album has further been recognized as a pioneering work in fusing rapping and singing, a technique later popularized by artists such as Drake, with a writer of Genius stating that Hill could simultaneously "go toe-to-toe with the best rappers and sing alongside R&B greats". MTV's Kyle Anderson reflected on the album's influence on subsequent efforts from neo soul artists such as Erykah Badu, Alicia Keys, and Jill Scott, while journalist Emil Wilbekin attributed the broad utilization of live instruments in contemporary R&B to the album. Talent manager Nick Shymansky acknowledged The Miseducation of Lauryn Hill prompting him to search for an artist similar to Hill, which led him to discover Amy Winehouse, who eventually began working on her debut album Frank (2003) with Commissioner Gordon.

The Miseducation of Lauryn Hill has been credited with influencing numerous albums by R&B and hip-hop artists. Its feminist themes and autobiographical songwriting have been acknowledged as the herald of Lemonade (2016) by Beyoncé, Ctrl (2017) by SZA, and Dirty Computer (2018) by Janelle Monáe, while its lyrical honesty and vulnerability went on to inspire Confessions (2004) by Usher. Influences of The Miseducation's musical style have been noted on Black Diamond (1999) by Angie Stone, Who Is Jill Scott?: Words and Sounds Vol. 1 (2000) by Jill Scott, 4 (2011) by Beyoncé, and Ivory (2022) by Omar Apollo. Rappers Kanye West and Pusha T have credited The Miseducation of Lauryn Hill for influencing their albums The College Dropout (2004) and Daytona (2018), respectively, while Lizzo employed Hill's rap-singing style and political themes on her debut studio album Lizzobangers (2013). Fusion of jazz instrumentals with a spoken word rap style, in addition to a diverse array of collaborators, on Kendrick Lamar's To Pimp a Butterfly (2015) has been attributed to The Miseducation of Lauryn Hill. Some hip-hop artists have titled their recordings after the album, such as Freddie Gibbs with his mixtape The Miseducation of Freddie Gibbs (2009), whose cover artwork also imitates Hill's, Lil' Kim with her 2007 track "Mis-education of Lil' Kim", which heavily samples and interpolates "Lost Ones", Teyana Taylor with her mixtape The Misunderstanding of Teyana Taylor (2012), and Calboy and Lil Wayne with their 2021 single "Miseducation".

A multitude of albums derived from other genres have also been influenced by The Miseducation of Lauryn Hill. Jesse Carmichael of the pop rock band Maroon 5 credited it with determining the sound of the band's debut studio album Songs About Jane (2002), with Hill's "Tell Him" influencing Maroon 5's "Sweetest Goodbye". Americana-folk rock singer-songwriter Lucinda Williams drew on The Miseducation of Lauryn Hill to incorporate soul stylings to her album World Without Tears (2003), particularly on its track "Righteously". Sweetener (2018) by the pop singer Ariana Grande was also influenced by The Miseducation of Lauryn Hill, principally through chord changes on "No Tears Left to Cry". Soft rock singer-songwriter Clairo attributed the inclusion of children on her debut studio album Immunity (2019) to the intro and interludes of The Miseducation of Lauryn Hill.

=== Tributes ===
In 2015, Marvel Comics released a series of variant comic book covers inspired by influential contemporary rap albums, which included a reimagined The Miseducation of Lauryn Hill-themed Ms. Marvel comic cover. Yerba Buena Center for the Arts music collective UnderCover Presents released the tribute album UnderCover Presents: A Tribute to The Miseducation of Lauryn Hill in 2017. In September 2018, in conjunction with the album's 20th anniversary, Legacy Recordings launched "The Miseducation of Lauryn Hill Album Cover Experience", which allowed users to recreate and personalize the cover, and subsequently post the final product on social media. The album was the subject of the 2018 book She Begat This: 20 Years of The Miseducation of Lauryn Hill by author and journalist Joan Morgan. To further commemorate the anniversary, Hill collaborated with American clothing company Woolrich to design The Miseducation of Lauryn Hill-inspired pieces for their collection "American Soul Since 1830", and starred in its accompanying advertising campaign. She performed at New York Fashion Week to promote the collection. Meanwhile, Spotify both presented the art installation "Dear Ms. Hill" in Brooklyn, which featured fan letters, and launched the miniseries Dissect, whose first season covered The Miseducation of Lauryn Hill and its impact.

== Track listing ==
All lyrics are written by Lauryn Hill, except where noted. All tracks are produced by Hill. (Note: "Lost Ones" and "To Zion" are co-produced by Che Pope, while "Lost Ones" is additionally produced by Vada Nobles.)

The Miseducation of Lauryn Hill
No.	Title	Lyrics	Music	Length
1.	"Intro"			0:47
2.	"Lost Ones"		Hill; Frederick Hibbert	5:33
3.	"Ex-Factor"		Hill; Alan Bergman; Marilyn Bergman; Dennis Coles; Robert Diggs; Gary Grice; Marvin Hamlisch; Lamont Hawkins; Jason Hunter; Russell Jones; Clifford Smith; Corey Woods	5:26
4.	"To Zion" (featuring Carlos Santana)		Hill; Charles Fox; Norman Gimbel	6:09
5.	"Doo Wop (That Thing)"		Hill	5:20
6.	"Superstar"	Hill; Johari Newton	Hill; James Poyser; Jim Morrison; Robby Krieger; John Densmore; Ray Manzarek	4:57
7.	"Final Hour"		Hill	4:16
8.	"When It Hurts So Bad"		Hill	5:42
9.	"I Used to Love Him" (featuring Mary J. Blige)		Hill	5:39
10.	"Forgive Them Father"		Hill; Bob Marley	5:15
11.	"Every Ghetto, Every City"		Hill; David Axelrod; Steve "Silk" Hurley	5:14
12.	"Nothing Even Matters" (featuring D'Angelo)		Hill	5:50
13.	"Everything Is Everything"	Hill; J. Newton	Hill	4:53
14.	"The Miseducation of Lauryn Hill"		Hill; Tejumold Newton	3:55
15.	"Can't Take My Eyes Off You" (hidden track)	Bob Crewe; Bob Gaudio	Crewe; Gaudio	3:41
16.	"Tell Him" (hidden track)		Hill	4:40
Total length:				77:17

Notes

- The interludes "Love", "How Many of You Have Ever", "Intelligent Women", "Love Is Confusion", "What Do You Think" (part one), and "What Do You Think" (part two) appear after "Lost Ones", "To Zion", "Doo Wop (That Thing)", "When It Hurts So Bad", "Forgive Them Father", and "Every Ghetto, Every City", respectively, as hidden tracks.
- On Japanese pressings, the interludes are listed as individual tracks. Japanese limited edition further includes a remix of "Ex-Factor" as the 23rd track.
- Some digital editions exclude "Can't Take My Eyes Off You" and "Tell Him", while others include them as individual tracks.

Sample credits

- Songwriters of sampled recordings were uncredited in the original liner notes, but were later credited on digital editions.
- "Lost Ones" contains replayed elements from "Bam Bam" by Toots and the Maytals, written by Frederick Hibbert.
- "Ex-Factor" contains replayed elements from "Can It Be All So Simple" by Wu-Tang Clan.
- "To Zion" contains elements from "And the Feeling's Good" by José Feliciano, written by Charles Fox and Norman Gimbel.
- "Superstar" contains elements from "Light My Fire" by the Doors, written by Jim Morrison, Robby Krieger, John Densmore, and Ray Manzarek.
- "Forgive Them Father" is an interpretation of "Concrete Jungle" by Bob Marley and the Wailers, written by Bob Marley.
- "Every Ghetto, Every City" contains replayed elements from "Tony Poem" by David Axelrod, and "Jack Your Body" by Steve "Silk" Hurley.

== Personnel ==
Credits are adapted from the liner notes of The Miseducation of Lauryn Hill.

- Al Anderson – guitar (track 12)
- Marc Baptiste – back cover photography, spine sheet photography
- Tom Barney – bass (tracks 1 and 11–13, and interludes)
- Bud Beadle – alto saxophone (tracks 1 and 7, and interludes), flute (tracks 1 and 7, and interludes), tenor saxophone (tracks 1 and 7, and interludes)
- Mary J. Blige – vocals (track 9)
- Errol Brown – engineering assistance (tracks 2 and 10)
- Robert Browne – guitar (track 2)
- Rudy Byrd – percussion (tracks 3, 6, and 8)
- Kenny Bobien – backing vocals (track 4)
- Chinah – backing vocals (track 9)
- Jared Crawford – live drums (track 4)
- D'Angelo – Rhodes piano (track 12), vocals (track 12)
- DJ Supreme – DJ elements (track 5)
- Don E – Hammond B-3 (track 1 and interludes), Rhodes piano (track 1 and interludes), piano (track 1 and interludes), Wurlitzer (track 1 and interludes)
- Francis Dunnery – guitar (tracks 1, 11, and 12, and interludes)
- Paul Fakhourie – bass (track 3)
- Veronica Fletcher – hair
- Tameka Foster – styling
- Dean Frasier – saxophone (tracks 5 and 10)
- Jenni Fujita – backing vocals (track 5)
- Anita Gibson – make-up
- Debra Ginyard – styling
- Erwin Gorostiza – art direction
- Lauryn Hill – arrangement (all tracks), art direction, executive production, guitar (track 6), production (all tracks), songwriting (tracks 1–14 and 16), vocals (tracks 2–16)
- Loris Holland – clarinet (track 11), electric piano (track 12), Hammond B-3 (tracks 1 and 12, and interludes), organ (track 14), Rhodes piano (tracks 1, 12, and 14, and interludes), piano (track 1 and interludes), Wurlitzer (tracks 1 and 12, and interludes)
- Matt Howe – recording (tracks 1 and 7, and interludes)
- Indigo Quartet – strings (tracks 5, 13, and 14)
- Derek Khan – styling
- Devon Kirkpatrick – digital editing
- Storm Jefferson – recording (tracks 8, 9, 11, and 12), mixing engineering assistance (tracks 2, 8, and 9)
- Eric Johnson – photography
- Fundisha Johnson – backing vocals (track 5)
- Sabrina Johnston – backing vocals (track 4)
- Ken Johnson – recording (track 9), recording engineering assistance (track 4)
- Julian Marley – guitar (track 10)
- Jenifer McNeil – backing vocals (track 9)
- Chris Meredith – bass (tracks 8, 10, and 12)
- Johari Newton – guitar (tracks 2, 3, and 8), lyrical songwriting (tracks 6 and 13)
- Tejumold Newton – musical songwriting (track 14), piano (track 3)
- Vada Nobles – additional production (track 2), drum programming (tracks 2, 3, 5, 6, 8, 10, and 13)
- Grace Paradise – harp (tracks 4, 6, and 8)
- Che "Guevara" Pope – drum programming (tracks 5, 6, 8–10, 12, and 13), production (tracks 2 and 4)
- Herb Powers Jr. – mastering (all tracks)
- James Poyser – celeste (track 5), electric piano (track 5), harpsichord (track 6), Moog bass (tracks 6 and 9), musical songwriting (track 6), organ (track 3), piano (track 5), Rhodes piano (tracks 3, 5, and 12), synth bass (tracks 2 and 4), Wurlitzer (tracks 3, 5, and 6)
- Tony Prendatt – engineering (track 14), recording (tracks 1, 6, 7, 9, and 12–14, and interludes)
- Rasheem Pugh – backing vocals (track 5)
- Lenesha Randolph – backing vocals (tracks 4, 5, 9, and 13)
- Squiddly Ranks – live drums (track 8)
- Everol Ray – trumpet (tracks 5 and 10)
- Warren Riker – recording (tracks 4, 5, 8, and 12), mixing engineering (tracks 2 and 9)
- Ramon Rivera – backing vocals (track 9)
- Earl Robinson – backing vocals (track 4)
- Kevin Robinson – trumpet (tracks 1 and 7, and interludes), flugelhorn (tracks 1 and 7, and interludes)
- Ronald "Nambo" Robinson – trombone (tracks 5 and 10)
- Matthew Rubano – bass (tracks 9 and 13)
- Carlos Santana – guitar (track 4)
- Jamie Seigel – mixing engineering assistance (track 4)
- Andrea Simmons – backing vocals (tracks 4 and 9)
- Earl Chinna Smith – guitar (tracks 2 and 10)
- Andrew Smith – guitar (tracks 1 and 7, and interludes)
- John R. Stephens – piano (track 13)
- Eddie Stockley – backing vocals (track 4)
- Greg Thompson – mixing engineering assistance (track 3)
- Shelley Thunder – vocals (track 10)
- Neil Tucker – recording engineering assistance (tracks 1 and 7, and interludes)
- Elizabeth Valletti – harp (tracks 1 and 7, and interludes)
- Chip Verspyck – recording engineering assistance (tracks 1, 3, and 7, and interludes)
- Brian Vibberts – recording engineering assistance (tracks 6, 10, and 12)
- Fayyaz Virji – trombone (tracks 1 and 7, and interludes)
- Ahmed Wallace – backing vocals (tracks 9 and 13)
- Tara Watkins – backing vocals (track 9)
- Gordon "Commissioner Gordon" Williams – engineering (tracks 9 and 14), mixing (tracks 1, 2, 4–6, 8, 10, 11, 13, and 14, and interludes), project supervision, recording (tracks 2–6 and 8–12)
- Suzette Williams – A&R
- Joe Wilson – piano (track 14)
- Rachel Wilson – backing vocals (track 9)
- Johnny Wyndrx – recording (track 4)
- Chuck Young – backing vocals (track 3)
- Stuart Zender – bass (tracks 1 and 7, and interludes)

== Charts ==
=== Weekly charts ===
1998–1999 weekly chart performance
Chart	Peak position
Australian Albums (ARIA)	2
Austrian Albums (Ö3 Austria)	4
Belgian Albums (Ultratop Flanders)	10
Belgian Albums (Ultratop Wallonia)	27
Canadian Albums (Billboard)	1
Canadian R&B Albums (SoundScan)	1
Danish Albums (Hitlisten)	15
Dutch Albums (Album Top 100)	11
European Top 100 Albums (Music & Media)	2
Finnish Albums (Suomen virallinen lista)	20
French Albums (SNEP)	3
German Albums (Offizielle Top 100)	9
Greek Albums (IFPI)	7
Irish Albums (IRMA)	1
Italian Albums (FIMI)	3
Japanese Albums (Oricon)	12
Japanese Albums (Oricon) Limited edition	6
New Zealand Albums (RMNZ)	5
Norwegian Albums (VG-lista)	2
Scottish Albums (Official Charts)	3
Spanish Albums (AFYVE)	11
Swedish Albums (Sverigetopplistan)	3
Swiss Albums (Schweizer Hitparade)	11
UK Albums (OCC)	2
UK R&B Albums (Official Charts)	1
US Billboard 200	1
US Top R&B/Hip-Hop Albums (Billboard)	1

2007–2026 weekly chart performance
Chart	Peak position
Greek Albums (IFPI)	2
Portuguese Albums (AFP)	25
US Indie Store Album Sales (Billboard)	15
US Top R&B Albums (Billboard)	20
US Top Rap Albums (Billboard)	12
US Vinyl Albums (Billboard)	20

=== Monthly charts ===
1999 monthly chart performance
Chart	Peak position
South Korean International Albums (RIAK)	16

=== Seasonal charts ===
1999 seasonal chart performance
Chart	Position
Norwegian Russetid Albums (VG-lista)	5
Norwegian Spring Albums (VG-lista)	4

=== Year-end charts ===
1998 year-end chart performance
Chart	Position
Canadian Top Albums/CDs (RPM)	39
Canadian Albums (SoundScan)	36
Canadian R&B Albums (SoundScan)	3
European Top 100 Albums (Music & Media)	47
French Albums (SNEP)	31
Japanese Albums (Oricon)	75
New Zealand Albums (RMNZ)	42
Swedish Albums (Sverigetopplistan)	97
UK Albums (OCC)	82
US Billboard 200	24
US Top R&B/Hip-Hop Albums (Billboard)	1

1999 year-end chart performance
Chart	Position
Australian Albums (ARIA)	46
Austrian Albums (Ö3 Austria)	19
Belgian Albums (Ultratop Flanders)	31
Belgian Albums (Ultratop Wallonia)	58
Danish Albums (Hitlisten)	40
Dutch Albums (Album Top 100)	34
European Top 100 Albums (Music & Media)	13
French Albums (SNEP)	36
German Albums (Offizielle Top 100)	34
New Zealand Albums (RMNZ)	25
Swedish Albums (Sverigetopplistan)	44
UK Albums (OCC)	17
US Billboard 200	11
US Top R&B/Hip-Hop Albums (Billboard)	3

2001 year-end chart performance
Chart	Position
Canadian R&B Albums (SoundScan)	98

2002 year-end chart performance
Chart	Position
Canadian R&B Albums (SoundScan)	133

=== Decade-end charts ===
1990s decade-end chart performance
Chart	Position
US Billboard 200	40

=== All-time charts ===
All-time chart performance
Chart	Position
Irish Female Albums (IRMA)	42
US Billboard 200 (Women)	61
US Top R&B/Hip-Hop Albums (Billboard)	28

== Certifications ==
Certifications and sales
Region	Certification	Certified units/sales
Australia (ARIA)	2× Platinum	140,000^{‡}
Austria (IFPI Austria)	Gold	25,000^{*}
Belgium (BRMA)	Platinum	50,000^{*}
Canada (Music Canada)	7× Platinum	700,000^{^}
Denmark (IFPI Danmark)	4× Platinum	80,000^{‡}
France (SNEP)	Platinum	300,000^{*}
Italy (FIMI)	Gold	25,000^{‡}
Japan (RIAJ)	Million	1,000,000^{^}
Netherlands (NVPI)	Platinum	100,000^{^}
New Zealand (RMNZ)	3× Platinum	45,000^{^}
Norway (IFPI Norway)	Platinum	50,000^{*}
South Korea	—	12,051
Spain (Promusicae)	Gold	50,000^{^}
Sweden (GLF)	Platinum	80,000^{^}
Switzerland (IFPI Switzerland)	Platinum	50,000^{^}
United Kingdom (BPI)	4× Platinum	1,200,000^{‡}
United States (RIAA)	Diamond	10,000,000^{‡}
Summaries
Europe (IFPI)	2× Platinum	2,000,000^{*}
Worldwide	—	20,000,000
^{*} Sales figures based on certification alone.^{^} Shipments figures based on certification alone.^{‡} Sales+streaming figures based on certification alone.

== Release history ==
Release dates and formats
Region	Date	Edition(s)	Format(s)	Label(s)	Ref.
Japan	August 19, 1998	Limited	CD	Sony Japan	
United States	August 25, 1998	Standard	Cassette; CD; MiniDisc; vinyl	Ruffhouse; Columbia	
Australia	August 31, 1998	Standard	CD	Sony	
France	September 25, 1998	Standard	CD	Columbia	
Germany	September 25, 1998	Standard	CD	Sony	
South Korea	September 28, 1998	Standard	Cassette; CD	Sony	
United Kingdom	September 28, 1998	Standard	Cassette; CD; MiniDisc; vinyl	Columbia	
Canada	September 29, 1998	Standard	Cassette; CD	Sony	
Japan	October 21, 1998	Standard	CD; MiniDisc	Sony Japan	

== See also ==
- Lauryn Hill discography
- List of Billboard 200 number-one albums of 1998
- List of Billboard number-one R&B albums of 1998
- List of Billboard number-one R&B albums of 1999
- List of number-one albums of 1998 (Canada)
- List of UK R&B Albums Chart number ones of 1998
- List of UK R&B Albums Chart number ones of 1999
- List of best-selling albums
- List of best-selling albums in the United States
- List of best-selling albums by women
