= The Miseducation Tour =

1999 concert tour by Lauryn Hill

- Tour by Lauryn Hill
- Location: Europe; Japan; North America
- Associated album: The Miseducation of Lauryn Hill
- Start date: January 21, 1999
- End date: August 15, 1999
- Legs: 4
- No. of shows: 70
- Supporting acts: Outkast; Busta Rhymes; The Roots; Slick Rick; Choclair

Lauryn Hill concert chronology
- The Miseducation Tour (1999); Smookin' Grooves Tour (2002)

The Miseducation Tour (alternatively titled Everything Is Everything Tour) was the debut solo concert tour by American rapper and singer-songwriter Lauryn Hill. It was launched in the support of her debut solo studio album The Miseducation of Lauryn Hill (1998). Although no immediate tour was planned in support of The Miseducation of Lauryn Hill, the tour commenced in Tokyo, Japan on January 21, 1999. After 70 shows across Japan, North America, and Europe, the tour concluded in Gainesville, Virginia on August 15, 1999.

Alongside songs from The Miseducation of Lauryn Hill, the set list for The Miseducation Tour incorporated songs Hill had recorded as a member of the Fugees, as well as covers of songs by other artists. The tour was sponsored by Armani and Levi Strauss & Co., which was seen as a pioneering approach to collaborations between brands and artists. Outkast, Busta Rhymes, The Roots, Slick Rick, and Choclair joined Hill as opening acts for different dates across North America.

The Miseducation Tour received widespread critical acclaim, primarily directed towards Hill's showmanship and vocal performance. It was a commercial success, as its numerous dates sold out upon announcement. Retrospectively, The Miseducation Tour has been credited with introducing arena touring among hip-hop artists and popularizing hip-hop, reggae, and dancehall among mainstream audiences.

== Background and development ==
In August 1998, Lauryn Hill released her debut solo studio album The Miseducation of Lauryn Hill. Recorded after her group Fugees embarked on a hiatus, the album was released to universal critical acclaim, and swiftly propelled Hill to ubiquitous recognition. It debuted atop the US Billboard 200 with first-week sales of 422,000 units, breaking numerous chart and sales records. (Note: attributed to multiple sources) Initially, there was no immediate tour planned in support of The Miseducation of Lauryn Hill, due to the album not needing further promotion and Hill being pregnant with her second child Selah, whom she gave birth to in November 1998. However, Hill soon recruited a band and began rehearsing for what would become The Miseducation Tour. She strived to alter arrangements of The Miseducation of Lauryn Hill tracks, so as to avoid tedium and repetition. The tour was formally announced in December 1998, with the first US leg set to commence in Detroit on February 18, 1999. Considering Hill's popularity in Japan, the country was chosen as the location for the tour's start, with four shows between January 21–25, so Hill and her band would have a chance to "shake down, and work out the musical problems that inevitably happened at the beginning of any big tour", before embarking on the US leg.

The Miseducation Tour was sponsored by Italian luxury fashion house Armani, as well as American clothing brand Levi Strauss & Co., both of whom supplied Hill and her band with wardrobe for the tour. (Note: attributed to multiple sources) Through the sponsorship, Armani endorsed its then-new Emporio Armani fragrance line, while a Levi's advertisement for the tour was featured in the August 1999 issue of Vogue. In January 1999, it was disclosed that American hip-hop duo Outkast would serve as the opening act for the US shows, in support of their third studio album Aquemini (1998), a decision Hill elaborated by stating: "A brethren of mine said that they remind him of the deacons of the church, they just strong but positive. And that's what I've always tried to be. There's nothing corny about what we do." Outkast returned as the opening act for the tour's subsequent US shows throughout July and August 1999, alongside rappers Busta Rhymes and Slick Rick, and hip-hop band The Roots. For the summer shows, the tour was also referred to as the Everything Is Everything Tour, with Hill opting for larger venues, such as arenas, rather than clubs and theaters, at which she performed throughout the first US leg. Having visited Japan, Europe, and North America, The Miseducation Tour finished after the summer leg, as Hill refrained from extending the tour further due to obligations to her family and difficulties she had experienced touring with the Fugees. An additional show was planned for Honolulu in October 1999, but was ultimately canceled shortly after announcement. According to biographer Chris Nickson, Hill was unwilling to make the tour "more grueling and draining. She'd come to know that there was much more to life than a career."

== Concert synopsis ==
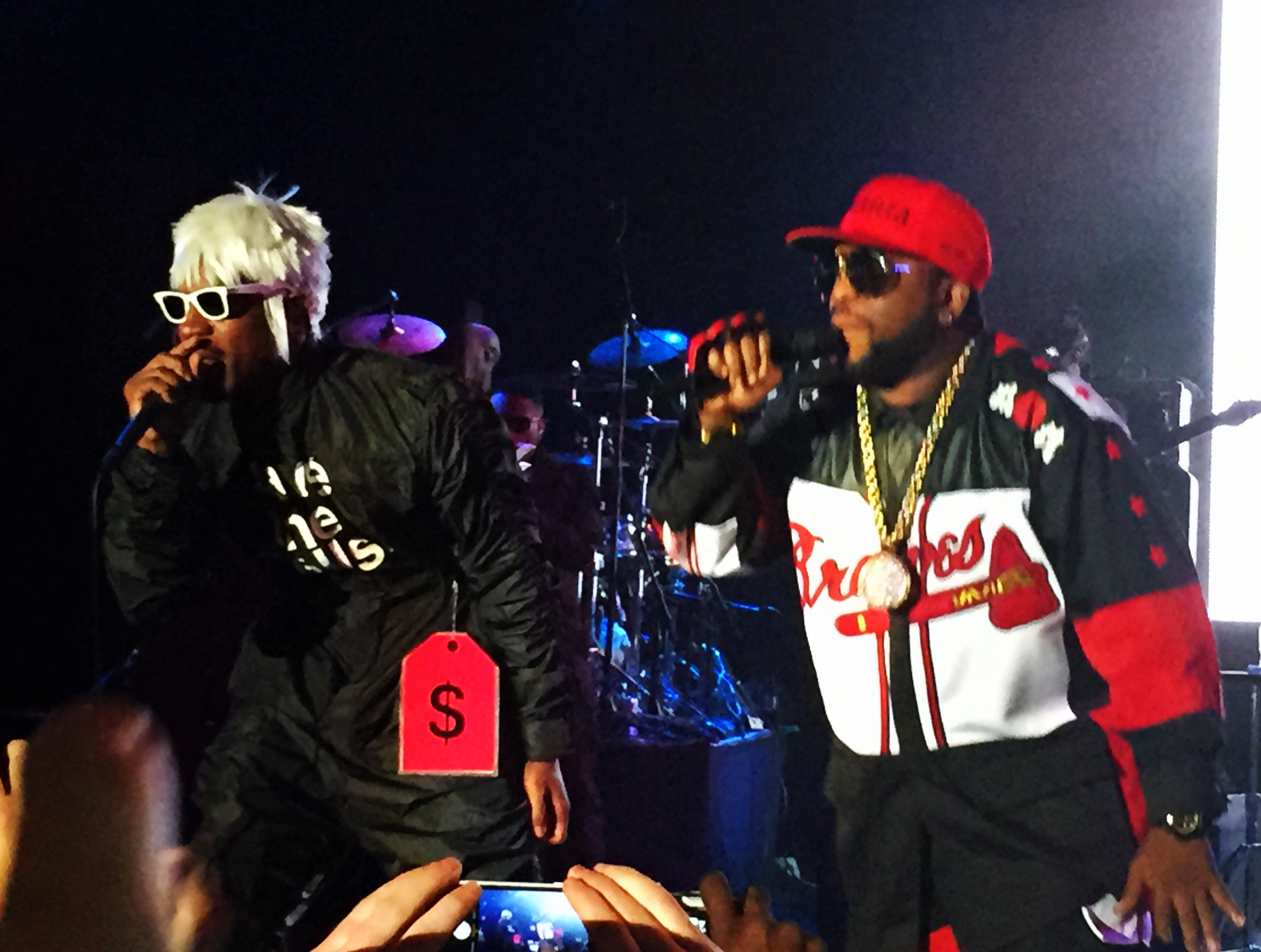
Outkast (pictured) joined The Miseducation Tour as the opening act for both of its US legs.

For The Miseducation Tour, Hill was accompanied by a 17-member band, which constisted of three background vocalists, three keyboardists, three hornists, two guitarists, two percussionists, a bassist, a rapper, and two disc jockeys. Numerous critics noted Hill's simplistic wardrobe for the concerts, which often incorporated denim items from Levi Strauss & Co. (Note: attributed to multiple sources) The shows began with a recording of Bob Marley's "Redemption Song" played before Hill entered the stage. In select concerts, Hill began her set by performing an organ-accompanied rendition of the gospel hymn "His Eye Is on the Sparrow" before walking towards the stage, while in others she would immediately perform a gospel-styled version of "Ex-Factor", against a backdrop displaying a stained-glass window effect. The gospel stylings continued with "Superstar", fusing with the song's hip-hop quality, before Hill transitioned into a medley of the Fugees' "Fu-Gee-La" and "Ready or Not", and Hill's collaboration with Nas "If I Ruled the World (Imagine That)". The medley was followed by "Every Ghetto, Every City" and "Lost Ones", with the latter accelerated into a jagged rap-funk number interspersed with elements of calypso, dancehall, and reggae toasting. Mary J. Blige joined Hill on stage during the show at The Theater at Madison Square Garden in New York City on March 23, 1999, to reprise their collaboration "I Used to Love Him".

Halfway through shows, Hill would exit the stage to change her clothing, while DJ Supreme and DJ Leon Higgins—the band's disc jockeys—would mix various songs by other artists on a turntable, including Jay-Z's "Can I Get A...", Sean Combs' "It's All About the Benjamins", Run-DMC's "Peter Piper", and The Notorious B.I.G.'s "Hypnotize". Alongside the disc jockeys, the band's drummer performed a solo with a snare drum and cymbals before playing Audio Two's "Top Billin'" on empty buckets. As Hill returned to the stage, she, alongside background vocalists and instrumentalists, engaged in a 20-minute old-school hip-hop-inspired contest against the disc jockeys and rapper Ademola McMullen, during which Hill performed several covers, including those of The Jackson 5's "I Want You Back" and Stevie Wonder's "Sir Duke", against contemporary turntablism and rap interference, asking the audience to judge the contest. Afterwards, she performed a rearranged version of "When It Hurts So Bad" infused with dub-influenced breaks, improvised lyrical alterations, and experimental instrumentation; "Forgive Them Father" was performed in a similar manner. Sitting on a classroom chair, Hill then performed "To Zion", with the song's subject, Hill's then-19-month-old son Zion David Marley, briefly joining her on stage during the performance at the CSU Convocation Center in Cleveland on March 21, 1999. Carlos Santana reprised his classical guitar contribution to the song during the concert at the Bill Graham Civic Auditorium in San Francisco on March 2. Hill would frequently close the main set with "Doo Wop (That Thing)", before performing an encore of "Killing Me Softly" and "Everything Is Everything".

== Reception and attendance ==
The Miseducation Tour was both a critical and commercial success. In a commentary on the tour's opening concert at Nippon Budokan in Tokyo on January 21, 1999, Philip Brasor of The Japan Times positively compared Hill's "modern-soul vocal trappings" to her studio vocal performance on The Miseducation of Lauryn Hill. Caroline Sullivan of The Guardian described the February 5 concert at the Brixton Academy in London as "casually chaotic" due to a large number of band members, but nonetheless commended Hill's stage presence and vocal performance. Gil Kaufman of MTV News praised the concert at the Bill Graham Civic Auditorium in San Francisco, emphasizing Hill's energetic performance and the show's celebratory atmosphere. Similarly, an anonymous editor of MTV News called the concerts at the Universal Amphitheatre in Los Angeles "energetically flawless", while another editor for the publication praised the first of three concerts at The Theater at Madison Square Garden in New York as "triumphant".

Though Richard Harrington of The Washington Post commended Hill for being an assured performer during The Miseducation Tour's stop at the DAR Constitution Hall in Washington, D.C. on March 16, 1999, he was ambivalent towards the overemphasis of covers in the set list, Hill being overpowered by her band, and the performance of Outkast. On the contrary, Michael David of Cleveland Scene praised Outkast's performance at the CSU Convocation Center in Cleveland. Reviewing the July 22 concert at the Arrowhead Pond of Anaheim for Los Angeles Times, Robert Hilburn hailed Hill's engaging and vigorous performance style, accentuating Hill's "uplifting, even electrifying spirit" which persevered after a transition from smaller to larger venues between the tour's two US legs. He also commended Busta Rhymes for his "lively" set. Hill was the second most-voted artist on The Washington Post's readers' poll of best concerts for 1999, behind Bruce Springsteen.

According to biographer Chris Nickson, all four dates of The Miseducation Tour in Japan sold out right after they were announced. February–March 1999 shows in Chicago, Los Angeles, Atlanta, and New York City were originally scheduled as singular dates, but were expanded after being sold out. (Note: attributed to multiple sources) The concert at the Bill Graham Civic Auditorium was also sold out. The February 18 show at the Fox Theatre in Detroit earned over $186,000. The two consecutive dates at the Fox Theatre in Atlanta grossed $440,307, being the seventh highest-grossing concerts of the first half of March. The March 28–29 dates at the Tower Theater in Upper Darby Township, Pennsylvania were both sold out, grossing $223,655. With average earnings of $246,660 per concert, Hill was the 10th highest-grossing touring artist of the first quarter of 1999, according to Pollstar. However, the second US leg, during which Hill performed at considerably larger venues, was not as successful, with the concert at the Coors Amphitheatre in San Diego recording an attendance of 7,489, equal to 37,45 percent of the venue's capacity of 20,000. Regardless of the attendance, Hill earned a reported $250,000 per show during the leg.

Numerous celebrities were in attendance at The Miseducation Tour shows, with Sean Combs and comedian Rosie O'Donnell attending the March 23 concert at The Theater at Madison Square Garden, while actors Harrison Ford and Casey Affleck, actress Natalie Portman, and television personality Star Jones attended the March 24 show at the same venue. The sold-out three concerts at the Universal Amphitheatre attracted singer Janet Jackson, rapper and actress Queen Latifah, musicians Bono and Babyface, actresses Salma Hayek, Shannen Doherty, Pamela Anderson, Tori Spelling, Christina Applegate, Reese Witherspoon, and Drew Barrymore; actors Ryan Phillippe, Val Kilmer, and Edward Norton, and basketball player Magic Johnson. Furthermore, fashion designer John Galliano and singer-songwriter Nina Simone attended the May 27 concert at Le Zénith in Paris and joined Hill onstage, while a 10-year-old Adele attended the concert at the Brixton Academy.

== Legacy ==
=== Impact ===
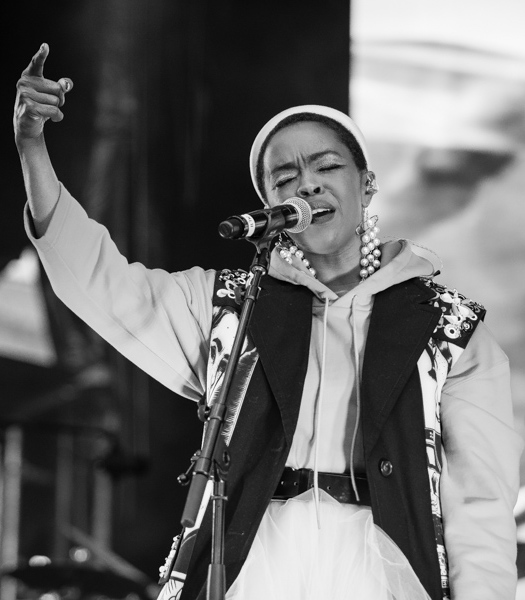
Hill performing during The Miseducation of Lauryn Hill 20th Anniversary Tour in 2019

In contemporary commentaries, The Miseducation Tour was deemed distinctive among other hip-hop concert tours, largely due to incorporating an expansive band, which was not a common practice in mainstream hip-hop at the time. In July 1999, Robert Hilburn of Los Angeles Times declared The Miseducation Tour "the most accomplished tour ever by a hip-hop artist". Elena Oumano of Billboard credited the tour with augmenting the popularity of reggae and dancehall among mainstream audiences, and for helping Jamaican artists of those genres, such as Lady Saw and Luciano, find success in the US. Frank DeCaro of The New York Times accentuated Hill's role in the late-1990s redefinition of New Jersey's reputation in mainstream culture, as Hill would frequently proclaim pride in her New Jersey background during the tour's concerts. Hartford Courant attributed the rising appeal of hip-hop towards tour promoters—who had previously refrained from allowing rappers to perform at arenas due to fearing violent incidents at concerts—to the Miseducation Tour.

The Miseducation Tour is further credited with establishing Outkast as touring artists, as their manager Michael "Blue" Williams reflected: "[When] we came off the tour, we started getting $100,000 a show. After that, we never went under $100,000 a show again. That was because we got in front of Lauryn's 12 million fans, who were hip hop and pop fans, and they became Outkast fans." Levi Strauss & Co.'s sponsorship of the tour, and selling a denim outfit consequently designed by Hill via their website, helped improve the company's declining sales and market its products to a younger demographic. The sponsorship marked an advanced concept at the time, deviating from the traditional jingle-based collaborations between brands and artists. Thembisa Mshaka of Okayplayer retrospectively recognized the importance of the tour's sponsorships for future collaborations between brands and black artists, writing: "When Levi Strauss put its name next to Lauryn Hill, a new course was charted. The Fortune 500 brand partnerships with Black musicians that are ubiquitous today were seeded by the success of Lauryn's solo debut." Outfits worn during The Miseducation Tour have been displayed via exhibitions at the Metropolitan Museum of Art and the Rock and Roll Hall of Fame. In 2019, Andscape named the tour the greatest female hip-hop tour of all time. According to Billboard in 2024, the tour contributed to Hill becoming the 19th highest-grossing touring hip-hop artist of all time, and the second highest-grossing female rapper.

=== Aftermath ===
Following The Miseducation Tour, Hill embarked on an extended hiatus from recording and performing, pursuing a private life. She would not perform live again until the 2001 Essence Awards, where she appeared with her head shaved, which marked a distinct departure from Hill's previous image. Accompanied solely by a self-played acoustic guitar, she performed the previously unreleased "Adam Lives in Theory". The performance was followed by an MTV Unplugged concert in July 2001, during which Hill similarly performed a set entirely composed of previously unreleased material, interspersed with speeches about her personal and artistic struggles. During the concert, Hill revealed she felt like a "prisoner" during The Miseducation Tour, due to prolonged periods spent in hotels and being unable to spend time with her children, having to sleep in order to preserve her voice. (Note: The speech would later be included on Hill's live album MTV Unplugged No. 2.0 (2002) as "Interlude 2".) The concert was recorded and released as a live album, titled MTV Unplugged No. 2.0, in May 2002; the album debuted at number three on the US Billboard 200. Initially met with critical polarity, (Note: attributed to multiple sources) the concert has undergone significant reappraisal in subsequent decades. (Note: attributed to multiple sources)

Although The Miseducation Tour was extensive, Hill did not perform all of the tracks from The Miseducation of Lauryn Hill within its duration. She would not perform the album in its entirety until August 2011, 13 years after its release, when she co-headlined the annual hip-hop festival Rock the Bells. The performances were met with a mixed reception, with reviewers criticizing her alterations of the songs' arrangements, a practice she had maintained throughout The Miseducation Tour as well. Hill continued changing arrangements and tempos of the tracks in subsequent concerts, elaborating: "There's no way I could continue to play the same songs over and over as long as I've been performing them without some variation and exploration". Speculation arose over Hill being prohibited from performing original versions in the aftermath of New Ark's lawsuit against her, (Note: In November 1998, New Ark—a collective of Hill's collaborators on The Miseducation of Lauryn Hill—filed a 50-page lawsuit against Hill, her management and her record label Columbia Records, stating that Hill "used their songs and production skills [on the album], but failed to properly credit them for the work." New Ark demanded writing and/or production credits for 13 of the album's 14 tracks, alongside monetary reimbursement. The lawsuit was settled out of court in February 2001, for a reported $5 million.) which she refuted. In April 2018, Hill announced The Miseducation of Lauryn Hill 20th Anniversary Tour, which commenced on July 11. The tour went on to visit North America, Europe, Oceania, Africa, and South America throughout 2018 and 2019. Despite mostly favorable commentaries on Hill's performances, her frequent tardiness elicited backlash from both audiences and critics.

In November 2020, an unauthorized live album Live in Tokyo, Japan '99, stating to have been recorded during The Miseducation Tour at a concert in Tokyo on September 7, 1999—though no concert was performed on that date—was made available for digital consumption by the label Active Driveway. In August 2023, Hill announced The Miseducation of Lauryn Hill 25th Anniversary Tour, which commenced on September 8, and originally spanned North America and Oceania. With the Fugees as the opening act for the North American dates, the tour also served as the group's reunion tour. The tour was subsequently expanded with an October–November 2024 European leg, retitled The Celebration Continues Tour. The Celebration Continues Tour was originally set to visit North America from August to September 2024, postponed from its original November–December 2023 scheduling due to Hill's vocal strain. However, the North American leg was canceled due to low ticket sales, which she attributed to media sensationalism over the dates' postponement.

== Set list ==
The set list is representative of the concert at the CSU Convocation Center in Cleveland on March 21, 1999. It does not represent all dates throughout The Miseducation Tour.

1. "Ex-Factor"
2. "Superstar"
3. "Fu-Gee-La"
4. "If I Ruled the World (Imagine That)"
5. "Ready or Not"
6. "Every Ghetto, Every City"
7. "Lost Ones"
8. "When It Hurts So Bad"
9. "I Want You Back"
10. "Sir Duke"
11. "To Zion"
12. "Doo Wop (That Thing)"

Encore

13. "Killing Me Softly"
14. "Everything Is Everything"

Notes

- "His Eye Is on the Sparrow" was performed before "Ex-Factor" during select concerts.
- "War" was performed after "Sir Duke" during the concert at Nippon Budokan in Tokyo on January 21, 1999.
- "As" was performed during the concert at the Brixton Academy in London on February 5, 1999.
- "Forgive Them Father" was performed during the concert at the Universal Amphitheatre in Los Angeles on March 5, 1999.
- "The Sweetest Thing" was performed during the concert at the DAR Constitution Hall in Washington, D.C. on March 16, 1999.
- "I Used to Love Him", "The Miseducation of Lauryn Hill", and "Movin' On Up" were performed during the concert at The Theater in Madison Square Garden in New York on March 23, 1999.

== Tour dates ==
List of concerts
Date (1999)	City	Country	Venue	Opening act(s)	Ref.
January 21	Tokyo	Japan	Nippon Budokan	—	
January 22	Tokyo	Japan	Nippon Budokan	—	
January 23	Tokyo	Japan	Tokyo International Forum Hall A	—	
January 25	Osaka	Japan	Osaka-jō Hall	—	
February 5	London	England	Brixton Academy	—	
February 13	Miami	United States	Bayfront Park	Outkast	
February 18	Detroit	United States	Fox Theatre	Outkast	
February 20	Chicago	United States	Chicago Theatre	Outkast	
February 21	Chicago	United States	Chicago Theatre	Outkast	
February 22	St. Louis	United States	Fox Theatre	Outkast	
February 26	Kansas City	United States	Midland Theatre	Outkast	
February 27	Denver	United States	Mammoth Events Center	Outkast	
March 1	Las Vegas	United States	House of Blues	Outkast	
March 2	San Francisco	United States	Bill Graham Civic Auditorium	Outkast	
March 3	Oakland	United States	Paramount Theatre	Outkast	
March 5	Los Angeles	United States	Universal Amphitheatre	Outkast	
March 6	Los Angeles	United States	Universal Amphitheatre	Outkast	
March 7	Los Angeles	United States	Universal Amphitheatre	Outkast	
March 10	Dallas	United States	Bronco Bowl	Outkast	
March 11	Houston	United States	Bayou Music Center	Outkast	
March 13	Atlanta	United States	Fox Theatre	Outkast	
March 14	Atlanta	United States	Fox Theatre	Outkast	
March 16	Washington, D.C.	United States	DAR Constitution Hall	Outkast	
March 21	Cleveland	United States	CSU Convocation Center	Outkast	
March 23	New York City	United States	The Theater at Madison Square Garden	Outkast	
March 24	New York City	United States	The Theater at Madison Square Garden	Outkast	
March 25	New York City	United States	The Theater at Madison Square Garden	Outkast	
March 28	Upper Darby	United States	Tower Theater	Outkast	
March 29	Upper Darby	United States	Tower Theater	Outkast	
March 31	Boston	United States	Wang Theatre	Outkast	
April 1	Newark	United States	New Jersey Performing Arts Center	Outkast	
May 13	Oslo	Norway	Oslo Spektrum	—	
May 14	Stockholm	Sweden	Stockholm Globe Arena	—	
May 16	Berlin	Germany	Tempodrom	—	
May 17 (Note: part of the 1999 Stadtpark Open Air)	Hamburg	Germany	Hamburg Stadtpark	—	
May 18	Düsseldorf	Germany	Philips Halle	—	
May 20	Stuttgart	Germany	Wagenhallen	—	
May 22 (Note: part of the 1999 Rock im Park)	Nuremberg	Germany	Frankenstadion	—	
May 23 (Note: part of the 1999 Rock am Ring)	Nürburg	Germany	Nürburgring	—	
May 24 (Note: part of the 1999 Pinkpop Festival)	Landgraaf	Netherlands	Megaland	—	
May 26	Brussels	Belgium	Forest National	—	
May 27	Paris	France	Le Zénith	—	
May 28	Amsterdam	Netherlands	Gashouder Westergasfabriek	—	
May 30	London	England	Wembley Arena	—	
May 31	Manchester	England	Manchester Evening News Arena	—	
June 2	Manchester	England	Manchester Evening News Arena	—	
June 30 (Note: part of the 1999 Summerfest)	Milwaukee	United States	Marcus Amphitheater	—	
July 11	Wantagh	United States	Jones Beach Theater	Busta Rhymes; Outkast; The Roots; Slick Rick (Note: opening acts alternated between shows)	
July 12	Holmdel	United States	PNC Bank Arts Center	Busta Rhymes; Outkast; The Roots; Slick Rick	
July 14	Virginia Beach	United States	GTE Virginia Beach Amphitheater	Busta Rhymes; Outkast; The Roots; Slick Rick	
July 16	Charlotte	United States	Blockbuster Pavilion	Busta Rhymes; Outkast; The Roots; Slick Rick	
July 17	Atlanta	United States	Lakewood Amphitheatre	Busta Rhymes; Outkast; The Roots; Slick Rick	
July 19	Dallas	United States	Coca-Cola Starplex Amphitheatre	Busta Rhymes; Outkast; The Roots; Slick Rick	
July 21	Phoenix	United States	Blockbuster Desert Sky Pavilion	Busta Rhymes; Outkast; The Roots; Slick Rick	
July 22	Anaheim	United States	Arrowhead Pond of Anaheim	Busta Rhymes; Outkast; The Roots; Slick Rick	
July 24	Las Vegas	United States	Hollywood Theatre	Busta Rhymes; Outkast; The Roots; Slick Rick	
July 25	Mountain View	United States	Shoreline Amphitheatre	Busta Rhymes; Outkast; The Roots; Slick Rick	
July 28	San Diego	United States	Coors Amphitheatre	Busta Rhymes; Outkast; The Roots; Slick Rick	
July 30	Englewood	United States	Fiddler's Green Amphitheatre	Busta Rhymes; Outkast; The Roots; Slick Rick	
July 31	Kansas City	United States	Sandstone Amphitheater	Busta Rhymes; Outkast; The Roots; Slick Rick	
August 2	Independence (Note: reported as Detroit)	United States	Pine Knob Music Theatre	Busta Rhymes; Outkast; The Roots; Slick Rick	
August 3	Grand Rapids	United States	Van Andel Arena	Busta Rhymes; Outkast; The Roots; Slick Rick	
August 5	Raleigh	United States	Alltel Pavilion	Busta Rhymes; Outkast; The Roots; Slick Rick	
August 6	Camden	United States	Blockbuster-Sony Music Entertainment Centre	Busta Rhymes; Outkast; The Roots; Slick Rick	
August 8	Mansfield (Note: reported as Boston)	United States	Tweeter Center for the Performing Arts	Busta Rhymes; Outkast; The Roots; Slick Rick	
August 10	Toronto	Canada	Molson Amphitheatre	Choclair	
August 11	Darien	United States	Darien Lake Performing Arts Center	Busta Rhymes; Outkast; The Roots; Slick Rick	
August 13	Chicago	United States	Rosemont Horizon	Busta Rhymes; Outkast; The Roots; Slick Rick	
August 14	Burgettstown	United States	Coca-Cola Star Lake Amphitheater	Busta Rhymes; Outkast; The Roots; Slick Rick	
August 15	Gainesville	United States	Nissan Pavilion	Busta Rhymes; Outkast; The Roots; Slick Rick	

=== Canceled shows ===
List of canceled concerts
Date (1999)	City	Country	Venue	Reason	Ref.
October 13	Honolulu	United States	Neal S. Blaisdell Center	Undisclosed	
