= The Westside Gazette =

- Type: Weekly newspaper
- Founder: Levi Henry
- Founded: 1971
- Headquarters: 545 N.W. 7th Terrace, Fort Lauderdale, FL 33311
- Website: thewestsidegazette.com

The Westside Gazette is a newspaper based in Broward County, Florida. It was established to serve an African American audience and is the oldest African-American newspaper in the region.

== History ==
Levi Henry (born Levi Henry, Jr.; April 3, 1932 - April 7, 2026) established the Westside Gazette in 1971, reportedly with "$158 and [his] good name". Henry, who began his career selling ads for radio station WRBD his contacts to advertisers to his new paper. The paper has broken several stories in South Florida's African-American community, including a 1990 incident in which longtime Fort Lauderdale Mayor Bob Cox told fourth-grade students that in order to be mayor, one had to be "free, white and 21".

A weekly paper, The Westside Gazette is now owned by Levi Henry's son, Bobby Henry. Henry's wife, Bertha Henry, was the Chief Executive of Broward County, Florida (County Administrator) for over a decade. Circulation of the newspaper increased from 10,000 copies in 1971 to 70,000 copies in 2001. PBS correspondent Yamiche Alcindor interned at the paper when she was in high school.

Competing African-American newspapers have alleged that The Westside Gazette inflates circulation numbers.

In 2025 the Westside Gazette entered into a partnership with the Broward County Library in order to preserve and digitize older issues of the newspaper. The issues are available through the Broward County Library Digital Archives. The partnership won the 2026 Library Media/Business Partner of the Year Award from the Florida Library Association.

== Awards ==
The Westside Gazette newspaper, nominated by Florida's Broward County Library, received the 2026 FLA Library Media/Business Partner of the Year Award.
