= "Commissioner" Gordon Williams =

American record producer

Gordon "Commissioner Gordon" Williams is an American record producer, audio engineer, and mixer. Dubbed the "Commissioner" by rapper KRS-One, he is the recipient of three Grammy Awards from three nominations.

== Music career ==
=== Early career ===
Williams' musical roots can be traced back to the Bronx. As a teenager, he experienced the advent of hip hop as a breakthrough musical genre and culture. He started out as a DJ, and from there delved into song production. He left Rutgers University, and attended New York's Center for Media Arts. After graduating, Williams was signed by an independent record label as a producer and member of a group, which scored a top-five dance record. He then earned a production deal with Motown Records, which led to Williams' emergence as a programmer and re-mixer.

=== 1998–2000 ===
Soon, his credits included projects with Jimmy Jam and Terry Lewis, Teddy Riley, Babyface, Stacy Lattisaw, Diana Ross, New Edition, Nile Rodgers and Quincy Jones. In 1998, Williams further extended his creative reach and became Senior Director of A&R at Sony Music Entertainment. During this time, he worked on Lauryn Hill's solo album, The Miseducation of Lauryn Hill and Will Smith's movie and soundtrack Men in Black. His label duties involved looking after the likes of Alicia Keys, Wyclef Jean and 50 Cent.

On The Miseducation of Lauryn Hill, Williams tied the vocals, music and effects together to help create one of the biggest-selling albums of 1998–1999. The album, which was described by Mary J. Blige as "one of the most incredible albums ever made" won five Grammys, two of which were awarded to Williams for his work on what was hailed as the Album of the Year. During those years, he was also the live sound mixer for Hill's world tour.

=== 2000–2007 ===
In 2000, Williams won another Grammy Award for participating in the mixing of Carlos Santana's multi-platinum Supernatural (Arista) which also won for Album of the Year. His credits include Joss Stone's multi-platinum Mind Body & Soul, Damian Marley's Grammy Award-winning Welcome to Jamrock, as well as Amy Winehouse's critically acclaimed debut album entitled Frank.

In 2007, Williams received an honorary degree from Gibbs College for writing the curriculum for their first audio engineering program. The program was accredited by the state of New Jersey and is currently an accredited associate degree course.

=== 2009–present: The Lalabela Alliance ===
In 2010, Williams was introduced to Bill Strickland of the Manchester Craftsmen's Guild, and agreed to implement his first program at one of Strickland's replication sites, NewBridge Center for Art and Technology in Cleveland. He has since set up programs in Ohio, New York and New Jersey. Williams is also a professor at Long Island University.

Williams is the founder of the Lalabela Alliance, a multi-faceted collective of companies with various specialties in the development of content, marketing, distribution and education. The Alliance strives to appeal to a wide and culturally diverse demographic producing, marketing and distributing music, film, television, gaming and multimedia content.

== Awards and nominations ==
Grammy Awards

Year	Nominee / work	Award	Result	Ref.
1999	The Miseducation of Lauryn Hill	Grammy Award for Best R&B Album	Won	
1999	The Miseducation of Lauryn Hill	Grammy Award for Album of the Year	Won	
2000	Supernatural	Grammy Award for Album of the Year	Won	
