= Reimbursement =

Act of compensating individuals for an out-of-pocket expense

Reimbursement is the act of compensating someone for an out-of-pocket expense by giving them an amount of money equal to what was spent.

Companies, governments and nonprofit organizations may compensate their employees or officers for necessary and reasonable expenses; under US law, these expenses may be deducted from taxes by the organization and treated as untaxed income for the recipient provided that accountability conditions are met. UK law provides for deductions for travel and subsistence. Reimbursement is also provided for supply, day care, mobile, medical, or education expenses, as determined by the payer. Similarly, a university, academic conference, or business conference may reimburse the expenses of an invited speaker or attendee.

Reimbursement is also used in insurance, when a provider pays for expenses after they have been paid directly by the policy holder or another party. This is especially relevant in health insurance, due to urgency, high costs, and administrative procedures which may cause a healthcare provider to incur costs pending reimbursement by a private or public provider (in the US, e.g., Medicare or a Health Reimbursement Account). Segments of the healthcare industry, such as medical device manufacturers, rely on reimbursement for income and produce resources assisting their customers (hospitals, physicians, etc.) in obtaining reimbursement.

Governments may reimburse taxpayers in several ways. A tax refund reduces the net tax paid, such as income tax, potentially to zero. Taxpayers may receive complete reimbursement for other taxes, such as for Value-added tax due to low income, subsequent export of the goods sold, or not being the final recipient. A local government may use reimbursement to reduce property taxes for a favored organization or low-income individual.

Employee reimbursements for travel are very popular. Often times when an employee is travelling for work, they will need to track expenses and submit to their employer for reimbursement.

== Reimbursement management ==
Reimbursement management is a crucial process that ensures individuals, government entities, and corporations are properly compensated for expenses incurred. It involves the careful tracking, verification, and processing of reimbursement claims, aiming to provide fair and timely reimbursements.

For individuals, reimbursement management plays a vital role in maintaining financial stability. Whether it's for travel expenses, medical costs, or business-related expenditures, individuals rely on reimbursement management systems to accurately calculate and reimburse their eligible expenses. By efficiently managing reimbursements, individuals can maintain their financial well-being and avoid unnecessary financial burdens. Reimbursement are sometimes performed via tax relief or other forms of welfare compensation to reduce the administration costs.

In the government sector, reimbursement management is essential for various reasons. Government agencies often deal with extensive financial transactions, including health and travel reimbursements, employee expenses, and vendor payments. Effective reimbursement management ensures transparency, accountability, and compliance with financial regulations. It helps government entities track expenses, control costs, and provide accurate financial reports to taxpayers and stakeholders.

In the corporate world, reimbursement management is equally important. Companies have various expense categories, such as employee travel, training, and client-related costs. Streamlining the reimbursement process ensures employees are reimbursed promptly, which boosts morale and productivity. Moreover, efficient reimbursement management helps organizations maintain accurate financial records, manage budgets, and comply with tax regulations.

To effectively manage reimbursements, organizations utilize dedicated reimbursement management software and systems. These systems automate the reimbursement process, allowing for efficient expense tracking, verification, and approval. They also provide real-time visibility into reimbursement status, reducing errors and delays.

== Barriers to reimbursement ==
Organizations have motive to limit reimbursement expenses, whether fraudulent, frivolous, or legitimate. If a reimbursement process is made cumbersome or inconvenient to the applicant, then the probability that the applicant will successfully obtain the funds decreases, regardless of legitimacy, resulting in fewer paid reimbursement claims overall.

Elements of cost-reducing reimbursement processes include:

- Insistence on submission of printed reimbursement forms (instead of email or online forms)
- Lengthy forms requiring detailed explanations
- Requiring that the applicant submit paper forms
- Requiring that original receipts (instead of copies) be attached with form
- Requiring that the applicant personally deliver documents to specific locations, which may be distant and have narrow and inconvenient operating hours
- Stringent rejection of forms with errors, even if the errors are minor or inconsequential
- Issuing paper checks (instead of cash or direct deposit), and possibly requiring that these be received at specific locations

In addition, a variety of tactics for denying reimbursement, including rescission, are associated with the insurance industry.
