= List of awards and nominations received by Lauryn Hill =

Lauryn Hill awards and nominations
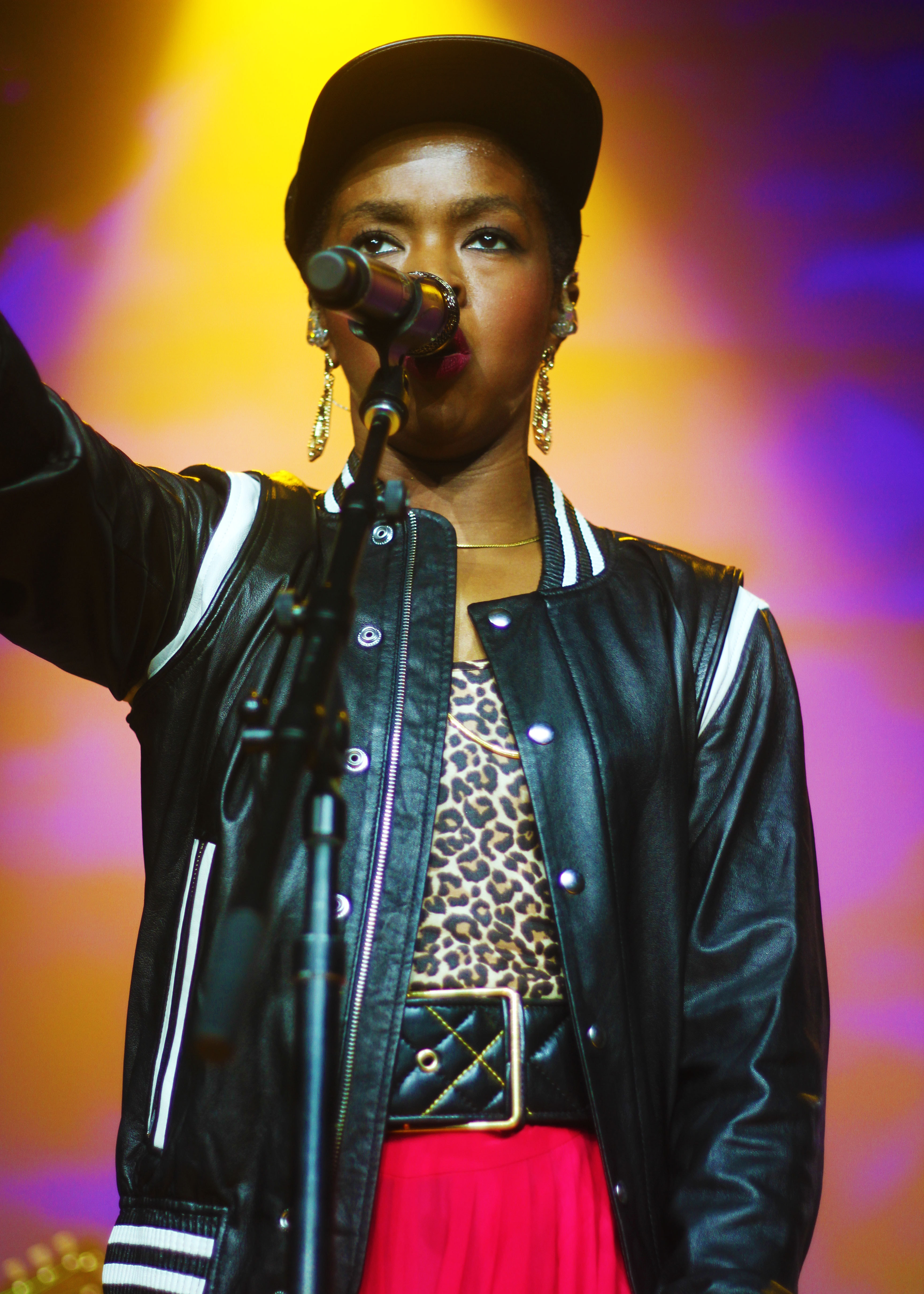
- Hill performing in 2014
Awards and nominations
Award	Wins	Nominations
American Music Awards	3	5
ASCAP Awards	9	9
BET Awards	1	1
BET Hip Hop Awards	0	1
Billboard Music Awards	2	7
Billboard Music Video Awards	4	7
Brit Awards	1	2
Dove Awards	1	1
Grammy Awards	8	19
Grammy Hall of Fame Award	2	2
Guinness World Records	4	4
HipHopDX Awards	0	2
Juno Awards	0	1
MTV Video Music Awards	6	10
NAACP Image Awards	4	9
UK Festival Awards	0	1
World Music Awards	8	8

Totals (Note: Certain award groups do not simply award one winner. They acknowledge several different recipients, have runners-up, and have third place. Since this is a specific recognition and is different from losing an award, runner-up mentions are considered wins in this award tally. For simplification and to avoid errors, each award in this list has been presumed to have had a prior nomination.)
- Wins: 108
- Nominations: 174

Lauryn Hill is an American singer, rapper, and songwriter. With a total of 8 wins from the Grammy Awards for her music (including her work in The Fugees), she is the most Grammy awarded female rapper. Hill was the first female hip hop artist to win the Grammy Awards for Best Rap Album (with The Fugees), and Best New Artist. Her first and only solo studio album, The Miseducation of Lauryn Hill, won five awards at the 41st Annual Grammy Awards, including Album of the Year, making it the first hip hop album to win the award, and making Hill the youngest black artist to win the award; Hill walked away with a total of five awards that night, breaking the record at the time for most awards won by a female artist in single ceremony, and set the current record for most nominations received by a female artist in a single ceremony.

In 2000, Hill won a consecutive Grammy Award for Album of the Year, as a producer on Santana's Supernatural, becoming the only female artist to win the award in two consecutive years, and the only female artist to win as a lead artist and as a producer. Hill was awarded Video of the Year at the 1999 MTV Video Music Awards, for her music video "Doo Wop (That Thing)", becoming the first hip hop video to win. Additionally Hill has won four NAACP Image Awards, Including the President's Award.

In 2015, she received the Golden Note Award from American Society of Composers, Authors and Publishers; and has won additional songwriting awards for her credits on Drake's "Nice for What", Aretha Franklin's "A Rose Is Still a Rose", Cardi B's "Be Careful", and Kanye West's "All Falls Down". Hill has broken a total of four Guinness World Records, throughout her career. In 2022, Hill was inducted into the Black Music & Entertainment Walk of Fame.

== Awards and nominations ==
Award	Year (Note: Indicates the year of ceremony. Each year is linked to the article about the awards held that year, wherever possible.)	Recipient(s) and nominee(s)	Category	Result	Ref.
Academy of Achievement	2000	Herself	Golden Plate Award	Won	
ASCAP Rhythm & Soul Awards	1999	"A Rose Is Still a Rose"	Award Winning R&B Songs	Won	
ASCAP Rhythm & Soul Awards	2000	"All That I Can Say"	Award Winning R&B Songs	Won	
ASCAP Rhythm & Soul Awards	2005	"All Falls Down"	Award Winning Rap Songs	Won	
ASCAP Rhythm & Soul Awards	2005	"All Falls Down"	Award Winning R&B/Hip-Hop Songs	Won	
ASCAP Rhythm & Soul Awards	2015	Herself	Golden Note	Won	
ASCAP Rhythm & Soul Awards	2019	"Nice for What"	Award Winning Rap Songs	Won	
ASCAP Rhythm & Soul Awards	2019	"Nice for What"	Top Rap Song	Won	
ASCAP Rhythm & Soul Awards	2019	"Be Careful"	Award Winning Rap Songs	Won	
ASCAP Pop Music Award	2019	"Nice for What"	Most Performed Songs	Won	
Amadeus Austrian Music Awards	2000	Herself	International Pop/Rock Female	Won	
American Music Awards	1997	Fugees	Favorite Soul/R&B Band/Duo/Group	Nominated	
American Music Awards	1997	Fugees	Favorite Pop/Rock Band/Duo/Group	Nominated	
American Music Awards	1999	Herself	Favorite New Artist — Soul/R&B	Won	
American Music Awards	2000	Herself	Favorite Female Artist — Soul/R&B	Won	
American Music Awards	2000	The Miseducation Of Lauryn Hill	Favorite Album — Soul/R&B	Won	
Apple Music's 100 Best Albums	2024	The Miseducation Of Lauryn Hill	100 Best Albums Award	Won	
BET Awards	2026	Herself	Living Legend Icon Award	Honored	
BET Hip Hop Awards	2022	"Nobody"	Impact Track	Nominated	
BDSCertified Spin Awards	2005	"Killing Me Softly"	400,000 Spins	Won	
BDSCertified Spin Awards	2011	"Killing Me Softly"	500,000 Spins	Won	
Billboard Music Awards	1996	The Score	R&B Album of the Year	Won	
Billboard Music Awards	1998	The Miseducation of Lauryn Hill	R&B Album of the Year	Won	
Billboard Music Awards	1998	Herself	R&B/Hip-Hop Album Artist of the Year	Nominated	
Billboard Music Awards	1999	Herself	R&B/Hip-Hop Album Artist of the Year	Nominated	
Billboard Music Awards	1999	Herself	Top R&B Artist of the Year	Nominated	
Billboard Music Awards	1999	Herself	Female Album Artist of the Year	Nominated	
Billboard Music Awards	1999	The Miseducation of Lauryn Hill	Top R&B Album	Nominated	
Billboard Music Video Awards	1996	"Killing Me Softly"	Best R&B Clip	Nominated	
Billboard Music Video Awards	1996	"Ready or Not"	Best Rap Clip	Nominated	
Billboard Music Video Awards	1996	"If I Ruled the World (Imagine That)"	Best Rap Clip	Nominated	
Billboard Music Video Awards	1998	"Doo Wop (That Thing)"	Best New Artist Clip	Won	
Billboard Music Video Awards	1999	"Ex-Factor"	Best New Artist Clip	Won	
Billboard Music Video Awards	1999	"Ex-Factor"	Best R&B Clip	Won	
Billboard Music Video Awards	1999	"Everything is Everything"	Best Rap Clip	Won	
Billboard Year-End Awards	1998	Herself	Top R&B Album Artist – Female	Won	
Billboard Year-End Awards	1998	The Miseducation of Lauryn Hill	Top R&B Album	Won	
Billboard Year-End Awards	1999	The Miseducation of Lauryn Hill	Top R&B / Hip-Hop Album Artist – Female	Won	
Billboard Year-End Awards	1999	Herself	Top R&B/Hip Hop Artist – Female	Won	
Black Reel Awards	2020	"Guarding the Gates"	Best Original Song	Nominated	
Blockbuster Award	1999	Herself	Favorite New Artist – Female	Won	
Brit Awards	1997	Fugees	Best International Group	Won	
Brit Awards	1999	Herself	International Female Solo Artist	Nominated	
D&AD Awards	2000	Police/AA/Shop	Cinematography	Graphite Pencil	
Danish Music Awards	1999	Herself	Best New International Artist	Won	
Dove Awards	2005	The Passion of the Christ: Songs	Special Event Album of the Year	Won	
Echo Music Prize	1996	Fugees	Best International Group	Won	
Edison Award	1999	Herself	Dance/R&B international Artist	Won	
Essence Awards	1999	Herself	Essence Award	Won	
Fryderyk	1997	The Score	Best Foreign Album	Nominated	
GAFFA Awards (Denmark)	1996	Fugees	Foreign New Act	Nominated	
GAFFA Awards (Denmark)	1998	Herself	Foreign New Act	Nominated	
Grammy Awards	1997	The Score	Album of the Year	Nominated	
Grammy Awards	1997	The Score	Best Rap Album	Won	
Grammy Awards	1997	"Killing Me Softly"	Best R&B Performance by a Duo or Group with Vocals	Won	
Grammy Awards	1999	Herself	Best New Artist	Won	
Grammy Awards	1999	Herself	Producer of the Year, Non-Classical	Nominated	
Grammy Awards	1999	The Miseducation of Lauryn Hill	Album of the Year	Won	
Grammy Awards	1999	The Miseducation of Lauryn Hill	Best R&B Album	Won	
Grammy Awards	1999	"Doo Wop (That Thing)"	Best Female R&B Vocal Performance	Won	
Grammy Awards	1999	"Doo Wop (That Thing)"	Best R&B Song	Won	
Grammy Awards	1999	"A Rose Is Still a Rose" (Aretha Franklin song; as songwriter)	Best R&B Song	Nominated	
Grammy Awards	1999	"Nothing Even Matters" (with D'Angelo)	Best R&B Performance by a Duo or Group with Vocals	Nominated	
Grammy Awards	1999	"Can't Take My Eyes Off of You"	Best Female Pop Vocal Performance	Nominated	
Grammy Awards	1999	"Lost Ones"	Best Rap Solo Performance	Nominated	
Grammy Awards	2000	Supernatural (Santana album; as producer)	Album of the Year	Won	
Grammy Awards	2000	"Everything Is Everything"	Best Music Video	Nominated	
Grammy Awards	2000	"All That I Can Say" (Mary J. Blige song; as songwriter)	Best R&B Song	Nominated	
Grammy Awards	2001	"Turn Your Lights Down Low" (with Bob Marley and the Wailers)	Best Pop Collaboration with Vocals	Nominated	
Grammy Awards	2003	"Mystery of Inequity" (from MTV Unplugged No. 2.0)	Best Rap Solo Performance	Nominated	
Grammy Awards	2006	"So High" (with John Legend)	Best R&B Performance by a Duo or Group with Vocals	Nominated	
Grammy Hall of Fame	2024	The Miseducation of Lauryn Hill	Hall of Fame	Inducted	
Grammy Hall of Fame	2025	Supernatural (Santana album; as producer)	Hall of Fame	Inducted	
HipHopDX Awards	2021	Herself	Best Rap Verse of the Year ("Nobody")	Nominated	
HipHopDX Awards	2021	"Nobody"	Best Hip Hop Song of the Year	Nominated	
Hungarian Music Awards	2000	The Miseducation of Lauryn Hill	Foreign Rap Album of the Year	Nominated	
IFPI Platinum Europe Award	1996	The Score	3× Platinum Europe Award	Won	
IFPI Platinum Europe Award	1997	The Score	4× Platinum Europe Award	Won	
IFPI Platinum Europe Award	1998	The Score	5× Platinum Europe Award	Won	
IFPI Platinum Europe Award	1999	The Miseducation of Lauryn Hill	2× Platinum Europe Award	Won	
IFPI Platinum Europe Award	2004	The Score	6× Platinum Europe Award	Won	
iHeartRadio MMVAs	1997	Fugees for "Ready or Not"	People's Choice: Favourite International Group	Nominated	
iHeartRadio MMVAs	1999	"Doo Wop (That Thing)"	Best International Video	Nominated	
iHeartRadio MMVAs	1999	"Everything Is Everything"	Best International Video	Nominated	
iHeartRadio MMVAs	1999	Herself	People's Choice: Favourite International Artist	Nominated	
International Dance Music Awards	1999	Herself	Best New Dance Solo Artist	Won	
IRMA Awards	1997	Fugees	International Award	Won	
Juno Award	1997	The Score	International Album of the Year	Nominated	
J-Wave Tokio Awards	1999	Herself	Best Female Artist	Won	
Lady of Soul Awards	1999	The Miseducation of Lauryn Hill	R&B/Soul Album of the Year	Won	
Lady of Soul Awards	1999	"Ex-Factor"	Best R&B/Soul Single, Solo	Won	
Lady of Soul Awards	1999	"Doo Wop (That Thing)"	Best R&B/Soul or Rap Music Video	Won	
Lady of Soul Awards	1999	Ex Factor	Best R&B/Soul Song of the Year	Nominated	
Lady of Soul Awards	2000	"Everything Is Everything"	Best R&B/Soul Single – Solo	Nominated	
MOBO Awards	1997	Fugees	Best International Act	Won	
MOBO Awards	1997	"Killing Me Softly"	Best International Song	Won	
MOBO Awards	1999	Herself	Best International Act	Won	
MTV Europe Music Awards	1996	"Killing Me Softly" (with The Fugees)	Best Song	Nominated	
MTV Europe Music Awards	1996	Fugees	Best New Act	Nominated	
MTV Europe Music Awards	1996	Fugees	MTV Amour	Won	
MTV Europe Music Awards	1996	Fugees	Best Group	Nominated	
MTV Europe Music Awards	1999	Herself	Best Female	Nominated	
MTV Europe Music Awards	1999	Herself	Best R&B	Nominated	
MTV Europe Music Awards	1999	The Miseducation of Lauryn Hill	Best Album	Nominated	
MTV Video Music Awards	1996	"Killing Me Softly"	Best Group Video	Nominated	
MTV Video Music Awards	1996	"Killing Me Softly"	Best R&B Video	Won	
MTV Video Music Awards	1996	Fugees	Viewer's Choice	Won	
MTV Video Music Awards	1999	"Doo Wop (That Thing)"	Video of the Year	Won	
MTV Video Music Awards	1999	"Doo Wop (That Thing)"	Best Female Video	Won	
MTV Video Music Awards	1999	"Doo Wop (That Thing)"	Best R&B Video	Won	
MTV Video Music Awards	1999	"Doo Wop (That Thing)"	Best Art Direction	Won	
MTV Video Music Awards	1999	"Doo Wop (That Thing)"	Best Hip-Hop Video	Nominated	
MTV Video Music Awards	2000	"Everything Is Everything"	Best Hip-Hop Video	Nominated	
MTV Video Music Awards	2000	"Everything Is Everything"	Best Art Direction	Nominated	
MTV Video Music Awards	2000	"Everything Is Everything"	Best Special Effects	Nominated	
MVPA Awards	1999	"Ex-Factor"	Best Makeup in a Music Video	Nominated	
MVPA Awards	1999	"Ex-Factor"	Best Colorist	Nominated	
MVPA Awards	1999	"Ex-Factor"	Urban/R&B Video of the Year	Nominated	
MVPA Awards	2000	"Turn Your Lights Down Low"	R&B Video of the Year	Nominated	
MVPA Awards	2000	"Everything Is Everything"	R&B Video of the Year	Won	
NAACP Image Awards	1999	Herself	Best New Artist	Won	
NAACP Image Awards	1999	Herself	Outstanding Female Artist	Won	
NAACP Image Awards	1999	Herself	President's Award for the Refugee Project	Won	
NAACP Image Awards	1999	The Miseducation Of Lauryn Hill	Best Album	Won	
NAACP Image Awards	2000	"Everything Is Everything"	Outstanding Music Video	Nominated	
NAACP Image Awards	2000	"Everything Is Everything"	Outstanding Song	Nominated	
NAACP Image Awards	2000	Herself	Outstanding Performance in a Variety Series/Special	Nominated	
NAACP Image Awards	2016	Herself	Outstanding Female Artist	Nominated	
NAACP Image Awards	2016	"Feeling Good"	Outstanding Song – Traditional	Nominated	
National Association of Black Owned Broadcasters Communications Awards	1999	Herself	Entertainment Achievement Award	Won	
NARM Best Seller Awards	1997	The Score (with Fugees)	Best R&B Recording	Won	
NARM Best Seller Awards	1997	The Score (with Fugees)	Best Rap Recording	Won	
New York Awards	1998	Herself	Music	Won	
Nickelodeon Kids' Choice Awards	1997	Fugees	Favorite Music Group	Won	
Nickelodeon Kids' Choice Awards	1997	"Killing me Softly"	Favorite Song	Won	
NRJ Music Award	2000	The Miseducation of Lauryn Hill	Album of the Year	Nominated	
NRJ Music Award	2000	Herself	Female Artist	Nominated	
NRJ Music Award	2000	Herself	Newcomer	Nominated	
Q Awards	1999	"Doo Wop (That Thing)"	Best single	Nominated	
Rockbjörnen	1996	The Fugees	Foreign Group	Won	
Rockbjörnen	1996	"Killing Me Softly"	Foreign Song	Won	
Soul Train Music Awards	1997	The Score (with Fugees)	R&B/Soul or Rap Album of the Year	Nominated	
Soul Train Music Awards	1999	The Miseducation Of Lauryn Hill	R&B/Soul or Rap Album of the Year	Won	
Soul Train Music Awards	1999	The Miseducation Of Lauryn Hill	Best R&B/Soul Album – Female	Won	
Soul Train Music Awards	1999	"Doo Wop (That Thing)"	The Michael Jackson Award for Best R&B/Soul or Rap Music Video	Won	
Soul Train Music Awards	1999	"Doo Wop (That Thing)"	Best R&B/Soul Single – Female	Nominated	
Soul Train Music Awards	1999	Herself	Sammy Davis, Jr. Entertainer of the Year Award	Won	
Soul Train Music Awards	2000	"Ex-Factor"	Best R&B/Soul Single, Female	Won	
Source Awards	1999	Herself	New Artist of the Year	Won	
Source Awards	1999	The Miseducation of Lauryn Hill	Album of the Year	Won	
Spin Reader's Award	1996	Fugees	Best Hip Hop Artist	Won	
Spin Reader's Award	1998	Herself	Best Hip Hop Artist	Won	
Teen Choice Awards	1999	Herself	Choice Breakout Artist	Nominated	
Teen Choice Awards	1999	Herself	Choice Female Artist	Nominated	
Teen Choice Awards	1999	"Doo Wop (That Thing)"	Choice Music Single	Nominated	
Teen Choice Awards	1999	The Miseducation of Lauryn Hill	Choice Music Album	Nominated	
UK Festival Awards	2026	Diaspora Calling!	Line-Up of The Year	Pending	
Vh1 Fashion Awards	1999	Herself	Most Fashionable Artist (Female)	Nominated	
Vh1 Fashion Awards	1999	"Doo Wop (That Thing)"	Visionary Video Award	Nominated	
WB Radio Music Award	2000	Herself	R&B Artist of the Year	Won	
WB Radio Music Award	2000	Herself	Hip-Hop Artist of the Year	Won	
World Music Awards	1997	Fugees	World's Best-Selling Pop Group	Won	
World Music Awards	1997	Fugees	World's Best-Selling Rap Group	Won	
World Music Awards	1997	Fugees	World's Best-Selling R&B Group	Won	
World Music Awards	1997	Fugees	World's Best-Selling American Group	Won	
World Music Awards	1997	Fugees	World's Best-Selling Group	Won	
World Music Awards	1999	Herself	World's Best-Selling Female R&B Artist	Won	
World Music Awards	1999	Herself	World's Best-Selling Female Rap Artist	Won	
World Music Awards	1999	Herself	World's Best-Selling New Artist	Won	

== Other accolades ==
=== State honors ===
Location	Date	Institution	Award
New Jersey	February 12, 2021	East Orange, New Jersey	Proclamation to commemorate the 25th anniversary of The Score, issued by mayor Mayor Ted R. Green

=== World records ===
Key
†	Indicates a now former record holder (Note: Note that this does not indicate that Lauryn Hill lost the record, only that the listed record holder was eventually surpassed.)

Name of publication, year the record was awarded, name of the record, and the name of the record holder
Publication	Year	World record	Record holder	Ref.
Guinness World Records	1999	Most Grammy Awards won in a single night by a female artist	† Lauryn Hill	
Guinness World Records	1999	First female rapper to win Best New Artist at the Grammys	Lauryn Hill	
Guinness World Records	1999	Most Grammy nominations in a single year for a female artist	Lauryn Hill	
Guinness World Records	2021	First female rapper to reach RIAA Diamond status	Lauryn Hill	

=== Atlanta Hip Hop Film Festival ===
Year	Nominated work	Award	Result	Ref
2004	Herself	Triple Threat	Won	

=== Black Music & Entertainment Walk of Fame ===
Year	Nominated work	Award	Result	Ref
2021	Herself	Inductee	Nominated	
2022	Herself	Inductee	Won	

=== Columbia High School Hall of Fame ===
Year	Nominated work	Award	Result	Ref
1999	Herself	Inductee	Won	

=== Vevo Certified Awards ===
Vevo Certified Award honors artists with over 100 million views on Vevo and its partners (including YouTube) through special features on the Vevo website. It was launched in June 2012.

Year	Nominee/Work	Certified videos	Ref.
2021	Lauryn Hill	2	
2021	Fugees	2	
As of April 11, 2021
