= Black rage =

Black rage can refer to:

- Black Rage (book), by William H. Grier and Price M. Cobbs, 1968
- Black Rage (film), by Chris Robinson, 1972
- Black Rage (Sketch), 2014 song
- Black rage defense, used in the 1994 trial of murderer Colin Ferguson
