= Lauryn Hill =

American rapper and singer (born 1975)

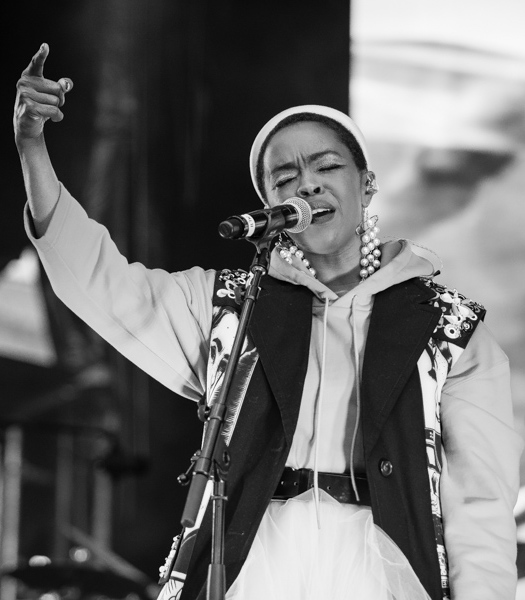
- Hill performing in 2019
- Born: Lauryn Noelle Hill; May 26, 1975 (age 51); East Orange, New Jersey, U.S.
- Other names: Ms. Lauryn Hill; L. Boogie
- Occupations: Rapper; singer; songwriter
- Years active: 1988–present
- Works: Discography
- Partner: Rohan Marley (1996–2009)
- Children: 6, including Selah & YG
- Awards: Full list
- Musical career
- Origin: South Orange, New Jersey, U.S.
- Genres: Hip-hop; hip-hop soul; soul; neo soul; reggae; R&B
- Instruments: Vocals; guitar
- Labels: Columbia; Island; Ruffhouse
- Member of: Fugees
- Website: mslaurynhill.com

Lauryn Noelle Hill (born May 26, 1975) is an American rapper, singer, and songwriter. She is considered one of the most influential musicians of her time. A definitive figure in neo soul and a pioneer of rap-singing and melodic rap, The Telegraph credited Hill with the popularization of hip-hop. NPR named her one of the 50 Great Voices and stated that her "voice is the story of the hip-hop generation". She was the only woman named on the lists of "Greatest MCs of All Time" (2006) by MTV and 10 Greatest Rappers by Billboard, and appeared on Rolling Stone's 200 Greatest Singers and VH1's 100 Women in Music.

Hill began her career as a teen actress, portraying Kira Johnson in the soap opera As the World Turns (1991) before appearing in Steven Soderbergh's film King of the Hill (1993). She received acclaim for her role as Rita Watson in Sister Act 2: Back in the Habit (1993), which featured her rendition of "His Eye Is on the Sparrow." Hill achieved prominence as the frontwoman of the Fugees. Their second album, The Score (1996), included the singles "Killing Me Softly" and "Ready or Not," and sold over 22 million copies worldwide. It won the Grammy Award for Best Rap Album, making Hill the first woman to receive the honor.

Her debut solo album, The Miseducation of Lauryn Hill (1998), debuted atop the Billboard 200 with the highest first-week sales for a female artist at the time and became the first recording by a female rapper to be certified diamond. Its lead single "Doo Wop (That Thing)" debuted at number one on the Billboard Hot 100, making Hill the first artist whose first appearance on both charts debuted at number one. The album produced several hits, including "Ex-Factor," "Everything Is Everything," and "Lost Ones." At the 41st Annual Grammy Awards, Hill became the first rapper to win Album of the Year and the first woman to win five awards in a single night. It remains one of the best-selling albums worldwide and ranked atop Apple Music's 100 Best Albums. Afterwards, she embarked on The Miseducation Tour and became the first rapper to appear on the cover of Time.

Around this period, Hill became a noted collaborator, featuring on "If I Ruled the World (Imagine That)" by Nas, "Guantanamera" by Wyclef Jean with Celia Cruz, "The Sweetest Thing" by Refugee Camp All-Stars, and the virtual duet "Turn Your Lights Down Low" with Bob Marley. She wrote "A Rose Is Still a Rose" by Aretha Franklin, and produced recordings for Whitney Houston, Mary J. Blige, and Santana. Her live album MTV Unplugged No. 2.0 (2002), featured original tracks such as "I Gotta Find Peace of Mind" and "Mystery of Iniquity", the latter of which was notably interpolated on "All Falls Down" by Kanye West. In the years that followed, Hill made fewer public appearances while occasionally releasing singles, including the Black Lives Matter protest song "Black Rage" and the Nas collaboration "Nobody".

Hill is the recipient of numerous accolades including eight Grammy Awards (the most for any female rapper), the inaugural BET Living Legend Icon Award, the ASCAP Golden Note Award, four NAACP Image Awards (including the President's Award), and six MTV Video Music Awards (including Video of the Year), with inductions into the Grammy Hall of Fame, the National Recording Registry, and the Black Music & Entertainment Walk of Fame. In 2026, she was nominated for the Rock and Roll Hall of Fame.

== Life and career ==
=== 1975–1990: Early life ===
Lauryn Noelle Hill was born on May 26, 1975, in East Orange, New Jersey. Her mother, Valerie Hill, was an English teacher, and her father, Mal Hill, a computer and management consultant. She has one sibling, an older brother named Malaney Hill, a computer engineer, who was born in 1972 and graduated from the University of Pennsylvania. Her Baptist family moved to New York for a short period before settling in South Orange.

Hill has said of her musically oriented family: "There were so many records, so much music constantly being played. My mother played the piano, my father sang, and we were always surrounded by music." Her father sang in local nightclubs and at weddings. While growing up, Hill frequently listened to Curtis Mayfield, Stevie Wonder, Aretha Franklin, and Gladys Knight; years later she recalled playing Marvin Gaye's What's Going On repeatedly until she fell asleep to it.

In middle school, Hill performed "The Star-Spangled Banner" before a basketball game. Due to its popularity, subsequent games featured a recording of her rendition. In 1988, Hill appeared as an Amateur Night contestant on It's Showtime at the Apollo. She sang her version of the Smokey Robinson track "Who's Lovin' You." Stumbling out of the gate to hit her notes, she initially garnered a mixed reaction from the crowd, but persevered through the performance, which ended in applause.

Hill attended Columbia High School, where she was a member of the track team, cheerleading squad and was a classmate of actor Zach Braff. She also took violin lessons, went to dance class, and founded the school's gospel choir. Academically, she took advanced placement classes and received primarily 'A' grades. School officials recognized her as a leader among the student body. Later recalling her education, Hill commented, "I had a love for—I don't know if it was necessarily for academics, more than it just was for achieving, period. If it was academics, if it was sports, if it was music, if it was dance, whatever it was, I was always driven to do a lot in whatever field or whatever area I was focusing on at the moment."

=== 1991–1993: Career beginnings ===
While a freshman in high school, through mutual friends, Prakazrel "Pras" Michel approached Hill about a music group he was creating. Hill and Pras began under the name Translator Crew. They came up with this name because they wanted to rhyme in different languages. Another female vocalist was soon replaced by Michel's cousin, multi-instrumentalist Wyclef Jean. The group began performing in local showcases and high school talent shows. Hill was initially only a singer, but then learned to rap too; instead of modeling herself on female rappers like Salt-N-Pepa and MC Lyte, she preferred male rappers like Ice Cube and developed her flow from listening to them. Hill later said, "I remember doing my homework in the bathroom stalls of hip-hop clubs."

While growing up, Hill took acting lessons in Manhattan. She began her acting career in 1991 appearing with Jean in Club XII, MC Lyte's Off-Broadway hip-hop rendering of Shakespeare's Twelfth Night. While the play was not a success, an agent noticed her. Later that year, Hill began appearing on the soap opera As the World Turns in a recurring role as troubled teenager Kira Johnson. She subsequently co-starred alongside Whoopi Goldberg in the 1993 release Sister Act 2: Back in the Habit, playing Rita Louise Watson, an inner-city Catholic school teenager with a surly, rebellious attitude. In it, she performed the songs "His Eye Is on the Sparrow" (a duet with Tanya Blount) and "Joyful, Joyful."

Director Bill Duke credited Hill with improvising a rap in a scene: "None of that was scripted. That was all Lauryn. She was amazing." Critic Roger Ebert said she had "a big joyful voice," although he thought her talent was wasted, while Rolling Stone said she "performed marvelously against type ... in the otherwise perfunctory [film]." Hill also appeared in Steven Soderbergh's 1993 motion picture King of the Hill, in a minor but pivotal role as a 1930s gum-popping elevator operator. Soderbergh biographer Jason Wood described her as supplying one of the warmest scenes in the film. Hill graduated from Columbia High School in 1993.

=== 1993–1998: Success with the Fugees and motherhood ===
Pras, Hill and Jean renamed their group Fugees, a derivative of the word "refugee," which was a derogatory term for Haitian Americans. Hill began a romantic relationship with Jean. As a teen, Hill acted on As the World Turns and in Sister Act 2. She used that money to help finance the early days of the group before they were signed. The Fugees, who signed a contract with Columbia/Ruffhouse Records in 1993, became known for their genre blending, particularly of reggae, rock and soul, which was first experimented on their debut album, Blunted on Reality, released in 1994. It reached No. 62 on the Billboard Top R&B/Hip-Hop Albums chart but overall sold poorly and was met by poor critical reviews due to their management's insistence they adopt gangsta rap attitudes. Although the album made little impact, Hill's rapping on "Some Seek Stardom" was seen as a highlight. Within the group, she was frequently referred to by the nickname "L. Boogie." Hill's image and artistry, as well as her full, rich, raspy alto voice, placed her at the forefront of the band, with some fans urging her to begin a solo career.

The Fugees' second album, The Score (1996), peaked at No. 1 on the U.S. Billboard 200 and stayed in the top ten of that chart for over half a year. It sold about seven million copies in the United States and more than 20 million copies worldwide. In the 1996 Pazz & Jop Critics Poll, The Score came second in the list of best albums and three of its tracks placed within the top 20 best singles. It won the Grammy Award for Best Rap Album, and was later included on Rolling Stone's list of the 500 greatest albums of all time. The Score garnered praise for being a strong alternative to the gangsta idiom, and Hill stated, "We're trying to do something positive with the music because it seems like only the negative is rising to the top these days. It only takes a drop of purity to clean a cesspool."

Singles from The Score included "Fu-Gee-La" and "Ready or Not," which highlighted Hill's singing and rapping abilities, and the Bob Marley cover "No Woman, No Cry." Her rendition of "Killing Me Softly" became the group's breakout hit. Buttressed by what Rolling Stone publications later called Hill's "evocative" vocal line and her "amazing pipes," the track became pervasive on pop, R&B, hip hop, and adult contemporary radio formats. It won the Grammy Award for Best R&B Performance by a Duo or Group with Vocals. On the album, Hill combined African-American music and Caribbean music influences with socially conscious lyrics. Newsweek mentioned Hill's "irresistibly cute looks" and proclaimed her "the most powerful new voice in rap."

When she was 21 years old, Hill was still living at home with her parents. She had been enrolled at Columbia University during this period, and considered majoring in history as she became a sophomore, but left after about a year of total studies once sales of The Score went into the millions. In 1996, she responded to a false rumor on The Howard Stern Show that she had made a racist comment on MTV, saying "How can I possibly be a racist? My music is universal. And I believe in God. If I believe in God, then I have to love all of God's creations. There can be no segregation."

In 1996, Hill founded the Refugee Project, a non-profit outreach organization that sought to transform the attitudes and behavior of at-risk urban youth. Part of this was Camp Hill, which offered stays in the Catskill Mountains for such youngsters; another was production of an annual Halloween haunted house in East Orange. Hill also raised money for Haitian refugees, supported clean water well-building projects in Kenya and Uganda, and staged a rap concert in Harlem to promote voter registration. A 1997 benefit event for the Refugee Project introduced a board of trustees for the organization that included Sean Combs, Mariah Carey, Busta Rhymes, Spike Lee, and others as members.

In 1997, the Fugees split to work on solo projects, which Jean later blamed on his tumultuous relationship with Hill and the fact he married his wife Claudinette while still involved with Hill. Meanwhile, in the summer of 1996 Hill had met Rohan Marley, a son of Bob Marley and a former University of Miami football player. Hill subsequently began a relationship with him, while still also involved with Jean. Hill became pregnant in late 1996, and on August 3, 1997, Marley and Hill's first child, Zion David, was born. The couple lived in Hill's childhood house in South Orange after she bought her parents a new house down the street.

Hill had a cameo appearance in the 1997 film Hav Plenty. In 1998, Hill took up another small, but important role in the film Restaurant; Entertainment Weekly praised her portrayal of the protagonist's pregnant former girlfriend as bringing vigor to the film.

=== 1998–1999: The Miseducation of Lauryn Hill ===
Hill recorded her solo record The Miseducation of Lauryn Hill from late 1997 through June 1998 at Tuff Gong Studios in Jamaica. The title was inspired by the book The Mis-Education of the Negro (1933) by Carter G. Woodson and The Education of Sonny Carson, a film and autobiographical novel. The album featured contributions from D'Angelo, Carlos Santana, Mary J. Blige and the then-unknown John Legend. Wyclef Jean initially did not support Hill recording a solo album, but eventually offered his production help; Hill turned him down. When she started recording The Miseducation of Lauryn Hill, she said she had harps, timpani, organs, clarinets—basically a whole orchestra—brought into the studio because she wanted the record to feel human and not overly "perfect" or programmed. Hill used the idea of "miseducation" to talk about learning real self-love and identity outside of what school or society teaches.

Several songs on the album concerned her frustration with the Fugees; "I Used to Love Him" dealt with the breakdown of her relationship with Wyclef Jean. Other songs such as "To Zion" spoke about her decision to have her first baby (Zion David Marley, the first of five she was to have with Rohan Marley), even though some at the time encouraged her to have an abortion so not to interfere with her blossoming career. Indeed, Hill's pregnancy revived her from a period of writer's block.

In terms of production, Hill collaborated with a group of musicians known as New Ark, consisting of Vada Nobles, Rasheem Pugh, Tejumold Newton, and Johari Newton. Hill later said that she wanted to "write songs that lyrically move me and have the integrity of reggae and the knock of hip-hop and the instrumentation of classic soul" and that the production on the album was intended to make the music sound raw and not computer-aided. Hill spoke of pressure from her label to emulate Prince, wherein all tracks would be credited as written and produced by the artist with little outside help. She also wanted to be appreciated as an auteur as much as Jean had within the Fugees. She also saw a feminist cause: "But step out and try and control things and there are doubts. This is a very sexist industry. They'll never throw the 'genius' title to a sister." While recording the album, when Hill was asked about providing contracts or documentation to the musicians, she replied, "We all love each other. This ain't about documents. This is blessed."

Released on August 25, 1998, the album received rave reviews from contemporary music critics, and was the most acclaimed album of 1998. Critics lauded the album's blending of the R&B, doo-wop, pop, hip-hop, and reggae genres and its honest representation of a woman's life and relationships. David Browne, writing in Entertainment Weekly, called it "an album of often-astonishing power, strength, and feeling," and praised Hill for "easily flowing from singing to rapping, evoking the past while forging a future of her own." Robert Christgau quipped, "PC record of the year—songs soft, singing ordinary, rapping skilled, rhymes up and down, skits de trop, production subtle and terrific." In 2017, NPR rated the album as the second-best album of all time created by a woman.

It sold nearly 423,000 copies in its first week (boosted by advance radio play of two non-label-sanctioned singles, "Lost Ones" and "Can't Take My Eyes Off You") and topped the Billboard 200 for four weeks and the Billboard R&B Albums chart for six weeks. It went on to sell about 10 million copies in the United States, and 20 million copies worldwide. During 1998 and 1999, Hill earned $25 million from record sales and touring. Hill, along with Blige, Missy Elliott, Meshell Ndegeocello, Erykah Badu, and others, found a voice with the neo soul genre.

The first single released from the album was "Doo Wop (That Thing)," which debuted at No. 1 on the Billboard Hot 100 chart. It exemplified Hill's appeal, combining feelings of self-empowerment with self-defense. Other charted singles from the album were "Ex-Factor," which has been sampled by Drake and Cardi B, "Everything Is Everything" and "To Zion." In the 1998 Pazz & Jop Critics Poll, Miseducation came second in the list of best albums and "Doo Wop (That Thing)" second in best singles.

In November 1998, Marley and Hill's second child, Selah Louise, was born. Of being a young mother of two, Hill said, "It's not an easy situation at all. You have to really pray and be honest with yourself."

In the run-up to the 1999 Grammy Awards, Hill became the first woman to be nominated in ten categories in a single year. In addition to Miseducation works, the nominations included her rendition of "Can't Take My Eyes Off You" for the 1997 film Conspiracy Theory, which had appeared on Billboard charts, and Hill's writing and producing of "A Rose Is Still a Rose," which became a late-in-career hit for Aretha Franklin. She appeared on several magazine covers, including Time, Esquire, Rolling Stone, Teen People, and The New York Times Fashion Magazine. During the ceremony, Hill broke another record by becoming the first woman to win five times in one night, taking home the awards for Album of the Year, Best R&B Album, Best R&B Song, Best Female R&B Vocal Performance, and Best New Artist. During an acceptance speech, she said, "This is crazy. This is hip-hop!" Hill had brought forth a new, mainstream acceptance of the genre.

In February 1999, Hill received four awards at the 30th Annual NAACP Image Awards. In May 1999, she became the youngest woman ever named to Ebony magazine's 100+ Most Influential Black Americans list; in November of that year, the same publication named her as one of "10 For Tomorrow" in the "Ebony 2000: Special Millennium Issue." In May 1999, she made People magazine's 50 Most Beautiful People list. The publication, which has called her "model-gorgeous," praised the 5-foot-4-inch (1.63 m) Hill for her idiosyncratic sense of personal style. In June 1999, she received an Essence Award, but her acceptance speech, where she said there was no contradiction in religious love and servitude and "[being] who you are, as fly and as hot and as whatever," drew reaction from those in the public who thought she was not a good role model as a young, unwed mother of two. This was a repetition of criticism she had received after the birth of her first child, and she had said that she and Marley would soon be married. In early 2000, Hill was one of the producers to share the Grammy Award for Album of the Year awarded for Santana's 1999 multi-million-selling Supernatural, whereon she had written, produced, and rapped on the track "Do You Like the Way" (a rumination on the direction the world was headed, it also featured the singing of CeeLo Green and the signature guitar runs of Carlos Santana). She was also nominated for Best R&B Song for "All That I Can Say," which she had written and produced for Mary J. Blige. Also, her concocted duet with Bob Marley on "Turn Your Lights Down Low" for the 1999 remix tribute album Chant Down Babylon additionally appeared in the 1999 film The Best Man and later received a Grammy nomination for Best Pop Collaboration with Vocals.

In November 1998, New Ark filed a fifty-page lawsuit against Hill, her management, and record label, claiming that Hill "used their songs and production skills, but failed to properly credit them for the work" on Miseducation. The musicians claimed to be the primary songwriters on two tracks, and major contributors on several others, though Gordon Williams, a prominent recorder, engineer, and mixer on Miseducation, described the album as a "powerfully personal effort by Hill" and said, "It was definitely her vision." Hill responded that New Ark had been appropriately credited and now were seeking to take advantage of her success. New Ark requested partial writing credits on most of the tracks on the album as well as monetary reimbursement. After many delays, depositions took place during the latter part of 2000. In part, the case illustrated the difficult boundaries between songwriting and all other aspects that went into contemporary arranging, sampling, and recording. The suit was eventually settled out of court in February 2001, with Hill paying New Ark a reported $5 million. A friend of Hill's later said of the suit, "That was the beginning of a chain effect that would turn everything a little crazy."

=== 2000–2003: Self-imposed exile and MTV Unplugged No. 2.0 ===
Hill began writing a screenplay about the life of Bob Marley, in the production of which she planned to play his wife Rita. She also began producing a romantic comedy about soul food with a working title of Sauce, and accepted a starring role in the film adaptation of Toni Morrison's novel Beloved; she later dropped out of both projects due to pregnancy. She also reportedly turned down acting roles in the remake for A Star Is Born (the movie was later released in 2018, with the part going to Lady Gaga), Dreamgirls (the role of Deena, later played by Beyoncé), Charlie's Angels (the part that went to Lucy Liu), The Bourne Identity, The Mexican, The Matrix Reloaded, and The Matrix Revolutions. In 2003 she performed at a Christmas concert at the Vatican and used the stage to publicly criticize Church leaders over sexual-abuse scandals, asking them what they had to say about the lives they had broken.

In 2000, Hill dropped out of the public eye. The pressures of fame began to overwhelm her. She disliked not being able to go out of her house to do simple errands without having to worry about her physical appearance. She fired her management team and began attending Bible study classes five days a week; she also stopped doing interviews, watching television, and listening to music. She started associating with a "spiritual advisor" named Brother Anthony. Some familiar with Hill believe Anthony more resembled a cult leader than a spiritual advisor, and thought his guidance probably inspired much of Hill's more controversial public behavior.

She later described this period of her life to Essence saying "People need to understand that the Lauryn Hill they were exposed to in the beginning was all that was allowed in that arena at that time ... I had to step away when I realized that for the sake of the machine, I was being way too compromised. I felt uncomfortable about having to smile in someone's face when I really didn't like them or even know them well enough to like them." She also spoke about her emotional crisis, saying, "For two or three years I was away from all social interaction. It was a very introspective time because I had to confront my fears and master every demonic thought about inferiority, about insecurity or the fear of being black, young and gifted in this western culture." She went on to say that she had to fight to retain her identity, and was forced "to deal with folks who weren't happy about that."

In July 2001, while pregnant with her third child, Hill unveiled her new material to a small crowd, for a taping of an MTV Unplugged special. A live album of the concert, titled MTV Unplugged No. 2.0, was released in May 2002 and featured only her singing and playing an acoustic guitar. Unlike the near-unanimous praise of Miseducation, 2.0 sharply divided critics. AllMusic gave the album 4 out of 5 stars, saying that the recording "is the unfinished, unflinching presentation of ideas and of a person. It may not be a proper follow-up to her first album, but it is fascinating." Rolling Stone called the album "a public breakdown," and Robert Hilburn of the Los Angeles Times said the album's title opened Hill up for jokes that she had become unhinged. NME wrote that "Unplugged 2.0 is a sparse and often gruelling listen, but there is enough genius shading these rough sketches to suggest that all might not yet be lost." With the mixed reviews and no significant radio airplay, 2.0 debuted at No. 3 on the Billboard 200. The album was later certified Platinum in the U.S. by the RIAA.

Her song "Mystery of Iniquity" from the album was nominated for a Grammy Award for Best Female Rap Solo Performance, and was used as an interpolation by Kanye West for his single "All Falls Down" featuring Syleena Johnson, leading to Hill being credited as a songwriter on the song.

Around 2001, Marley and Hill's third child, Joshua Omaru (YG Marley), was born. He was followed a year later by their fourth. While Hill sometimes had spoken of Marley as her husband, they never married, and along the way she was informed that Marley had been previously married at a young age. According to a 2003 Rolling Stone report, he had never secured a divorce. Marley later disputed this and made public to a blog a 1996 divorce document from Haiti. The two had been living in a high-end Miami hotel, but around 2003 she moved out into her own place in that city. Hill later said that she and Marley "have had long periods of separation over the years." Hill slowly worked on a new album and it was reported that by 2003, Columbia Records had spent more than $2.5 million funding it, including installing a recording studio in the singer's Miami apartment and flying different musicians around the country.

By 2002, Hill had shut down her non-profit Refugee Project. She said, "I had a nonprofit organization and I had to shut all that down. You know, smiling with big checks, obligatory things, not having things come from a place of passion. That's slavery. Everything we do should be a result of our gratitude for what God has done for us. It should be passionate."

In December 2003, Hill, during a performance in Vatican City, spoke of the "corruption, exploitation, and abuses" in reference to the molestation of boys by Catholic priests in the United States and the cover-up of offenses by Catholic Church officials. High-ranking church officials were in attendance, but Pope John Paul II was not present. The Catholic League called Hill "pathologically miserable" and claimed her career was "in decline." The following day, several reporters suggested that Hill's comments at the Vatican may have been influenced by her spiritual advisor, Brother Anthony.

=== 2004–2009: Sporadic touring and recording ===
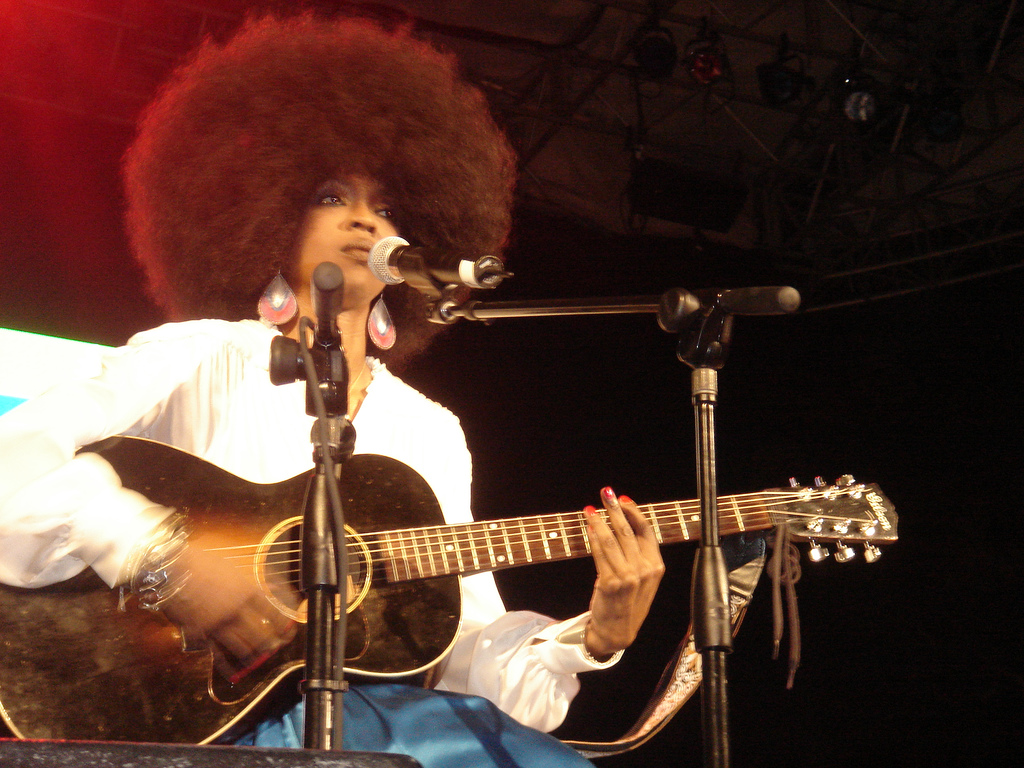
Hill performing in 2005

In 2004, Hill contributed a new song, "The Passion," to The Passion of the Christ: Songs. A remix version with John Legend of his "So High" ended up receiving a Grammy Award nomination for Best R&B Performance by a Duo or Group with Vocals. Around this time, Hill began selling a pay-per-view music video of the song "Social Drugs" through her website. Those who purchase the $15 video would only be able to view it three times before it expired. In addition to the video, Hill began selling autographed posters and Polaroids through her website, with some items listed at upwards of $500. The "classroom" interludes on the album feature real children talking about love with a teacher. Decades later, fans have tracked some of those kids—now adults—on social media to ask what it was like being on the record.

For the first time since 1997, the Fugees performed in September 2004 at Dave Chappelle's Block Party in the Bedford–Stuyvesant neighborhood of Brooklyn. The concert featured Hill's nearly a cappella rendition of "Killing Me Softly." The event was recorded by director Michel Gondry and was released on March 3, 2006, to universal acclaim. The Fugees also appeared at BET Awards 2005 during June 2005, where they opened the show with a 12-minute set. One track, "Take It Easy," was leaked online and thereafter was released as an Internet single in late September. It peaked at No. 40 on the Billboard R&B Chart.

In 2005, she told USA Today, "If I make music now, it will only be to provide information to my own children. If other people benefit from it, then so be it." When asked how she now felt about the songs on 2.0, she stated "a lot of the songs were transitional. The music was about how I was feeling at the time, even though I was documenting my distress as well as my bursts of joy."

The Fugees embarked on a European tour in late 2005. Old tensions between Hill and the other members of the group soon resurfaced, and the reunion ended before an album could be recorded; Jean and Michel both blamed Hill for the split. Hill reportedly demanded to be addressed by everyone, including her bandmates, as "Ms. Hill"; she also considered changing her moniker to "Empress." Hill's tardiness was also cited as a contributing factor.

Hill began touring on her own, although to mixed reviews; often arriving late to concerts (sometimes by over two hours), performing unpopular reconfigurations of her songs and sporting an exaggerated appearance. On some occasions, fans booed her and left early. In June 2007, Sony Records said Hill had been recording through the past decade, had accumulated considerable unreleased material and had re-entered the studio with the goal of making a new album. Later that same year, an album titled Ms. Hill, which featured cuts from Miseducation, various soundtrack contributions and other "unreleased" songs, was released. It features guest appearances from D'Angelo, Rah Digga and John Forté. Also in June 2007, Hill released a new song, "Lose Myself," on the soundtrack to the film Surf's Up.

In early 2008, Marley and Hill's fifth child, Sara, was born. The couple were not living together, although Marley considered them "spiritually together" even while listing himself as single on social media. Hill later said that she and Marley "have [had] a long and complex history about which many inaccuracies have been reported since the beginning" and that they both valued their privacy. By August 2008, Hill was living with her mother and children in her hometown of South Orange, New Jersey.

Reports in mid-2008 claimed that Columbia Records then believed Hill to be on hiatus. Marley disputed these claims, telling an interviewer that Hill has enough material for several albums: "She writes music in the bathroom, on toilet paper, on the wall. She writes it in the mirror if the mirror smokes up. She writes constantly. This woman does not sleep." One of the few public appearances Hill made in 2008 was at a Martha Stewart book signing in New Jersey, perplexing some in the press.

In April 2009, it was reported that Hill would engage in a 10-day tour of European summer festivals during mid-July of that year. She performed two shows for the tour and passed out on stage during the start of her second performance and left the stage. She refused to provide refunds for angry consumers. On June 10, Hill's management informed the promoters of the Stockholm Jazz Festival, which she was scheduled to headline, that she would not be performing due to unspecified "health reasons." Shortly afterward, the rest of the tour was canceled as well. At events like Sundance, her team has reportedly requested that staff address her strictly as "Ms. Hill," which some people read as diva behavior and others as her setting firm boundaries and respect.

=== 2010–2022: Further activities and imprisonment ===
In January 2010, Hill returned to the live stage and performed in stops across New Zealand and Australia on the Raggamuffin Music Festival. Many of the songs that Hill had performed and recorded over the past six years were included on an April 2010 unofficial compilation album titled Khulami Phase. The album also features a range of other material found on the Ms. Hill compilation. Hill appeared at the Harmony Festival in Santa Rosa, California, in June 2010, her first live American performance in several years. An unreleased song called "Repercussions" was leaked via the Internet in late July 2010, debuting at No. 94 on Billboard's Hot R&B/Hip-Hop Songs (and peaked at No. 83 the following week), making it her first Billboard chart appearance as a lead artist since 1999.

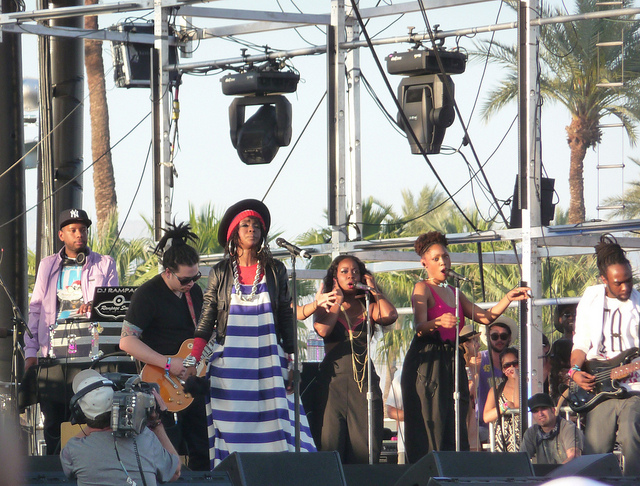
Hill and her backing musicians performing at the Coachella Valley Music and Arts Festival, 2011

Hill joined the Rock the Bells hip-hop festival series in the U.S. during August 2010, and as part of that year's theme of rendering classic albums, she performed The Miseducation of Lauryn Hill in its entirety for the first time. She increased the tempo and urgency from the original recording, but at times had difficulty in communicating with her band. Hill continued touring, including a set at the 6th Annual Jazz in the Gardens, in Miami Gardens, Florida in December. In Spring 2011, Hill performed at the Coachella Valley Music Festival, New Orleans Jazz Fest, and at the Cosmopolitan of Las Vegas. In July 2011, Hill gave birth to her sixth child, Micah, her first not with Rohan Marley; the father remains publicly unknown.

In February 2012, Hill performed a new song titled "Fearless Vampire Killer," during a sold-out performance at the Warner Theater in Washington, D.C. In late 2012, Hill toured with rapper Nas; her portion of the tour, titled Black Rage, is named after her song, released October 30. Hill has described the song as being "about the derivative effects of racial inequity and abuse" and "a juxtaposition to the statement 'life is good,' which she believes can only be so when these long standing issues are addressed and resolved."

In June 2012, Hill was charged with three counts of tax fraud or failing to file taxes (Title 26 USC § 7202 Willful failure to collect or pay over tax) not tax evasion on $1.8 million of income earned between 2005 and 2007. During this time she had toured as a musical artist, earned royalties from both her records and from films she had appeared in, and had owned and been in charge of multiple corporations. In a long post to her Tumblr, Hill said that she had gone "underground" and had rejected pop culture's "climate of hostility, false entitlement, manipulation, racial prejudice, sexism, and ageism." She added, "When I was working consistently without being affected by the interferences mentioned above, I filed and paid my taxes. This only stopped when it was necessary to withdraw from society, in order to guarantee the safety and well-being of myself and my family."

In June 2012, Hill appeared in the United States District Court for the District of New Jersey in Newark and pleaded guilty to the charges. Her attorney said she would make restitution for the back taxes she owed. By April 2013, Hill had paid back only $50,000 of the $554,000 she owed immediately. U.S. Magistrate Judge Madeline Cox Arleo criticized Hill, saying "This is not someone who stands before the court penniless. This is a criminal matter. Actions speak louder than words, and there has been no effort here to pay these taxes." Hill faced possible eviction from her rented home in South Orange as well as a civil lawsuit from the town for running a business out of a home without a zoning permit.

On May 4, 2013, Hill released her first official single in over a decade, "Neurotic Society (Compulsory Mix)." She later published a message on her Tumblr describing how she was "required to release [it] immediately, by virtue of the impending legal deadline." The release received some criticism for lyrics that appeared to tie societal decay to certain LGBT social movements. Hill responded that the song was not targeted at any particular group but was instead focused on anyone hiding behind neurotic behavior. Following a deal with Sony Music, which involves Hill creating a new record label within the company, Hill was said to be scheduled to release her first album in fifteen years during 2013.

On May 6, 2013, Hill was sentenced by Judge Arleo to serve three months in prison for failing to file taxes/tax fraud and three months' house arrest afterwards as part of a year of supervised probation. She had faced a possible sentence of as long as 36 months, and the sentence given took into account her lack of a prior criminal record and her six minor-aged children. By this point Hill had fully paid back $970,000 in back taxes and penalties she owed, which also took into account an additional $500,000 that Hill had in unreported income for 2008 and 2009. In the courtroom, Hill said that she had lived "very modestly" considering how much money she had made for others, and that "I am a child of former slaves who had a system imposed on them. I had an economic system imposed on me." Hill reported to the minimum-security Federal Correctional Institution, Danbury, on July 8, 2013, to begin serving her sentence.

Hill was released from prison on October 4, 2013, a few days early for good behavior, and began her home confinement and probationary periods. She put out a single called "Consumerism" that she had finished, via verbal and e-mailed instructions, while incarcerated. Judge Arleo allowed her to postpone part of her confinement in order to tour in late 2013 under strict conditions.

During 2014, Hill was heard as the narrator of Concerning Violence, an award-winning Swedish documentary on the African liberation struggles of the 1960s and 1970s. She also continued to draw media attention for her erratic behavior, appearing late twice in the same day for sets at Voodoo Fest in November 2014.

In May 2015, Hill canceled her scheduled concert outside Tel Aviv in Israel following a social media campaign from activists promoting the Boycott, Divestment and Sanctions campaign. She said she had wanted to also perform a show in Ramallah in the West Bank but logistical problems had proved too great. Hill stated: "It is very important to me that my presence or message not be misconstrued, or a source of alienation to either my Israeli or my Palestinian fans."

Hill contributed her voice to the soundtrack for What Happened, Miss Simone?, a 2015 documentary about the life of Nina Simone, an American singer, pianist, and civil rights activist. Hill was originally supposed to record only two songs for the record, but ended up recording six. She also served as a producer on the compilation alongside Robert Glasper. Hill said of her connection to Simone: "Because I fed on this music ... I believed I always had a right to have a voice. Her example is clearly a form of sustenance to a generation needing to find theirs. What a gift." NPR critically praised Hill's performance on the soundtrack, stating: "This album mainly showcases Lauryn Hill's breadth and dexterity. Not formally marketed as Hill's comeback album, her six tracks here make this her most comprehensive set of studio recordings since The Miseducation of Lauryn Hill in 1998."

In April 2016, Hill hosted and headlined what was billed as the inaugural Diaspora Calling! festival at the Kings Theatre in Brooklyn. The festival's purpose was to showcase the efforts of musicians and artists from around the African diaspora like Brooklyn Haitian Rara band Brother High Full Tempo. The following month, Hill was approximately 2 hours and 20 minutes late for her show at the Chastain Park Amphitheatre in Atlanta, though members of Hill's team claimed it was only an hour after their scheduled start time. Moments after the less-than-40-minute show ended due to the venue's strict 11:00 p.m. closing time, Hill said her driver had gotten lost and she could not help that. Less than 48 hours later, after a large backlash from her fans on Twitter, she took to her Facebook page and stated she was late for the concert because of certain needs, including her need to "align her energy with the time." A 2021 Rolling Stone piece is one of her few in-depth interviews in recent years. She used it to clear up myths about Miseducation and talk honestly about protecting her family and mental space from the pressures of fame.

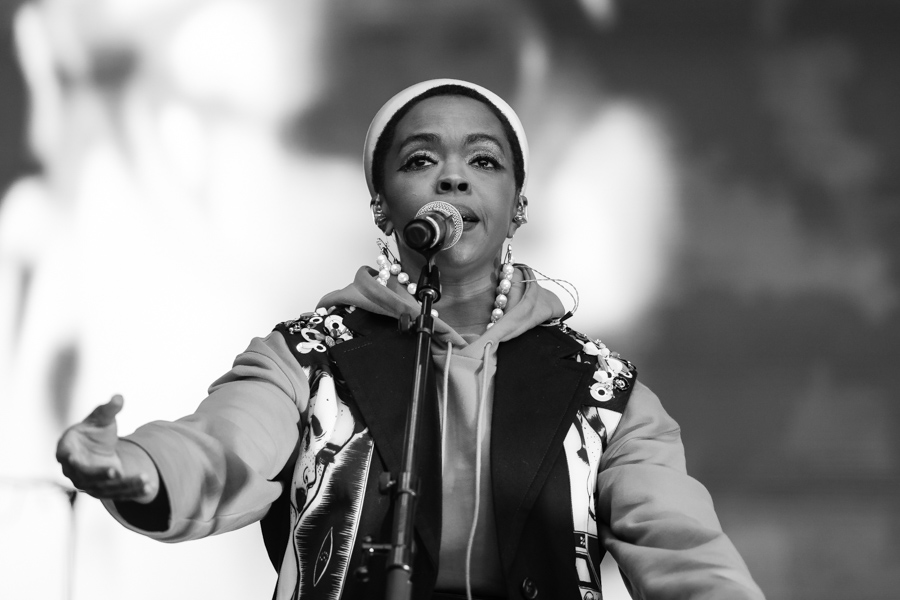
Hill performing at the Kongsberg Jazzfestival 2019

Hill recorded a studio version of her song, "Guarding the Gates," for the movie Queen & Slim, which was released on November 27, 2019. This song appears on the album, Queen & Slim: The Soundtrack.

=== 2023–present: Fugees reunion tour controversy ===
On April 14, 2024, Lauryn Hill made her return to the stage at Coachella. Hill's son, YG Marley, was performing when Hill surprised the crowd by making an appearance. Hill performed several solo songs from her career, but was also reunited with former Fugees bandmate, Wyclef Jean, to perform numerous hit songs.

The Fugees were scheduled to start a reunion tour in August 2024 but the U.S. dates were quietly canceled three days before the first show, with no reason given to customers receiving refunds, but Hill cited "clickbait headlines" and low ticket sales as an explanation. The cancellations received media scrutiny, to which Hill responded "I can assure you that no one is more disappointed about not being able to perform than I am." Pras released a diss track titled "Bar Mitzfa" which criticized Hill that same month. In October 2024, Pras sued Hill for breach of contract and fraud, accusing her of mismanaging the budgeting of their tour in "a veiled and devious attempt to make a big score for herself." Hill responded to each of the claims made in the lawsuit on Instagram, and said it "is full of false claims and unwarranted attacks. It notably omits that he was advanced overpayment for the last tour and has failed to repay substantial loans extended by myself as an act of good will." Also in 2024, Hill appeared on Warriors, a concept album by Lin-Manuel Miranda and Eisa Davis based on the 1979 film of the same name.

In 2026, Hill performed at the 68th Annual Grammy Awards, leading the "In Memoriam" tribute to Roberta Flack and D'Angelo, who both died in 2025. This marked her first Grammy Awards performance since 1999, appearing alongside her former Fugees bandmate, Wyclef Jean. The tribute included a performance of her 1998 song recorded with D'Angelo, "Nothing Even Matters," and was topped off by a full-ensemble performance led by Hill and Jean of the Fugees' 1997 hit, "Killing Me Softly With His Song," which was first popularized by Flack's 1974 Grammy-winning rendition. They were joined throughout the performance by other artists such as: Lucky Daye, Raphael Saadiq, Anthony Hamilton, Leon Thomas, Bilal, Jon Batiste, Leon Bridges, Lalah Hathaway, October London, John Legend, and Chaka Khan. In April 2026, Hill made a surprise appearance during a Kanye West concert at SoFi Stadium in Los Angeles. She joined West for performances of "All Falls Down" and "Believe What I Say" (both of which sample her work) as well as solo renditions of "Lost Ones" and "Doo Wop (That Thing)", two songs from The Miseducation of Lauryn Hill. She would later feature on the deluxe edition of West's album Bully, on the track "I Can't Wait", where she sang a rendition of The Supremes' "You Can't Hurry Love".

== Public image ==
=== Fashion and beauty ===
Well known for styling her hair in locs, braids, bantu knots and afros, Hill is often associated with the revival of the natural hair movement. She has been credited as one of the people who have helped normalize locs, and introduced them to pop culture. Author Joan Morgan noted that "for a young person who was growing up in the '90s and liked that natural look but didn't want to identify as Rasta, there was really no example until Lauryn Hill." Hill is also frequently listed among the people who have defined modern bantu knots and afros. Ebony noted that she "helped to usher in a new standard of beauty for Black women - one grounded in the richness and authenticity of their African heritage."

PopSugar placed her on their list of the "18 Moments in Hair History That Changed the World," and wrote, "When searching for the originator in the recent natural hair revival, you must look to Lauryn Hill. She emerged as the feminine lead in the Fugees and broke Grammy records as a soloist, all while popularizing dreadlocks in the mainstream." Stylist mentioned Hill gracing the cover of Time in locs, and being named one of People's 50 Most Beautiful People in 1999, as one of the most definitive moments in the history of black hair.

In an interview with Vogue, R&B singer SZA, stated "The only girl that I could look to for natural hair inspiration growing up was Lauryn Hill." According to celebrity hairstylist Yusef Williams, who styled Rihanna's hair on the set of Ocean's 8, the singer "channeled her inner Lauryn Hill" while wearing locs for her role in the movie. Halle Bailey named Hill as one of her beauty icons, while mentioning "I love Lauryn Hill's hair."

=== Endorsements ===
In 1999, Hill partnered with Levi Strauss & Co. to create custom outfits for her Miseducation Tour. Journalist Thembisa Mshaka of Okayplayer wrote: "when Levi Strauss put its name next to Lauryn Hill, a new course was charted. The Fortune 500 brand partnerships with Black musicians that are ubiquitous today were seeded by the success of Lauryn's solo debut." A custom ensemble made for Hill by Levi's was put on display during the Levi Strauss: A History of American Style exhibit at the Contemporary Jewish Museum.

Hill also partnered with Armani during the late 1990s; the brand designed multiple custom looks for Hill and helped sponsor her Miseducation of Lauryn Hill tour. A design created by Armani for the tour was on put display for the 1999 "Rock Style" themed Met Gala.

== Activism ==
=== Philanthropy ===
In the late 1990s, Hill presided over the Refugee Project, a nonprofit organization that served youth in New Jersey. The organization offered New Jersey youth scholarships, mentoring, after-school programs, a reading club and a summer camp program. The Refugee Project's board of directors included Mariah Carey, Spike Lee, actor Malcolm Jamal Warner, and rappers Busta Rhymes, Q-Tip, and Nas.

In 1999, she collaborated with the Federal government of the United States for an anti-drug campaign. On July 11, 2000, a hearing evaluating the National Youth Anti-Drug Media Campaign was held at Congress. During the hearing, it was announced that Hill's ad from the campaign was the most popular amongst a group of polled youth, with nearly 95 percent stating that they were affected by the ad. That same year, Hill participated in UNCF's 'Evening of Stars' telethon fundraiser, which raised $13.5 million. Hill later performed during the 2005 Live 8 benefit concert, to help raise awareness on global poverty.

According to Billboard, Hill provided 10 scholarships for the 2019–2020 academic year to students at Alpha Institute in Kingston, Jamaica, through her MLH Fund.

=== 2003 Vatican performance ===
In 2003, Hill was scheduled to perform at a Christmas benefit concert at the Vatican, located in a 7,500-seat concert hall customarily used by the Pope for his weekly general audiences. During the concert, Hill spoke out against sexual abuse of children by priests, stating "God has been a witness to the corruption of his leadership, to the exploitation and abuses. It is the least one can say about the clergy." Hill added, "I realize some of you may be offended by what I'm saying, but what do you say to the families who were betrayed by the people in whom they believed?" The Pope was not in attendance; however, concert attendees included Cardinal Camillo Ruini, the pope's vicar for Rome and the head of Italian bishops conference, his deputy, Monsignor Rino Fisichella, and Edmund Szoka. The comments sparked controversy at the time, and were edited out of the broadcast, which was set to air on Mediaset's flagship Canale 5 station. In retrospect, many critics have applauded Hill for speaking out.

=== Social and political activism ===
In 2014, Hill published the song "Black Rage" to SoundCloud in protest of the killing of Michael Brown. That same year, she performed at the Amnesty International "Bringing Human Rights Home" benefit concert in New York, in support of Pussy Riot, where she performed "Black Rage."

In 2015, she canceled a show in Israel after she was faced with a social media campaign by activists who urged her to boycott Israel over its occupation of Palestinian land. She later clarified that she does not take sides in the Israeli-Palestinian conflict, but "believes in dignity for all sides," according to professor Noura Erakat.

Hill released an updated version of her 2002 track "I Find It Hard to Say (Rebel)" from her MTV Unplugged No. 2.0 live album, retitled "Rebel" in 2016. The updated song was released exclusively on Tidal, and was performed at the Tidal X 1015 charity concert hosted by Jay-Z. The song was originally written about the Killing of Amadou Diallo, and was updated due to the influx of Police brutality in the United States at the time.

Variety reported that Hill declined an offer by the National Football League to join pop rock band Maroon 5 during their Super Bowl LIII halftime show, in solidarity with American football player Colin Kaepernick, after he received backlash for taking the knee.

== Legacy ==
=== Music Industry ===
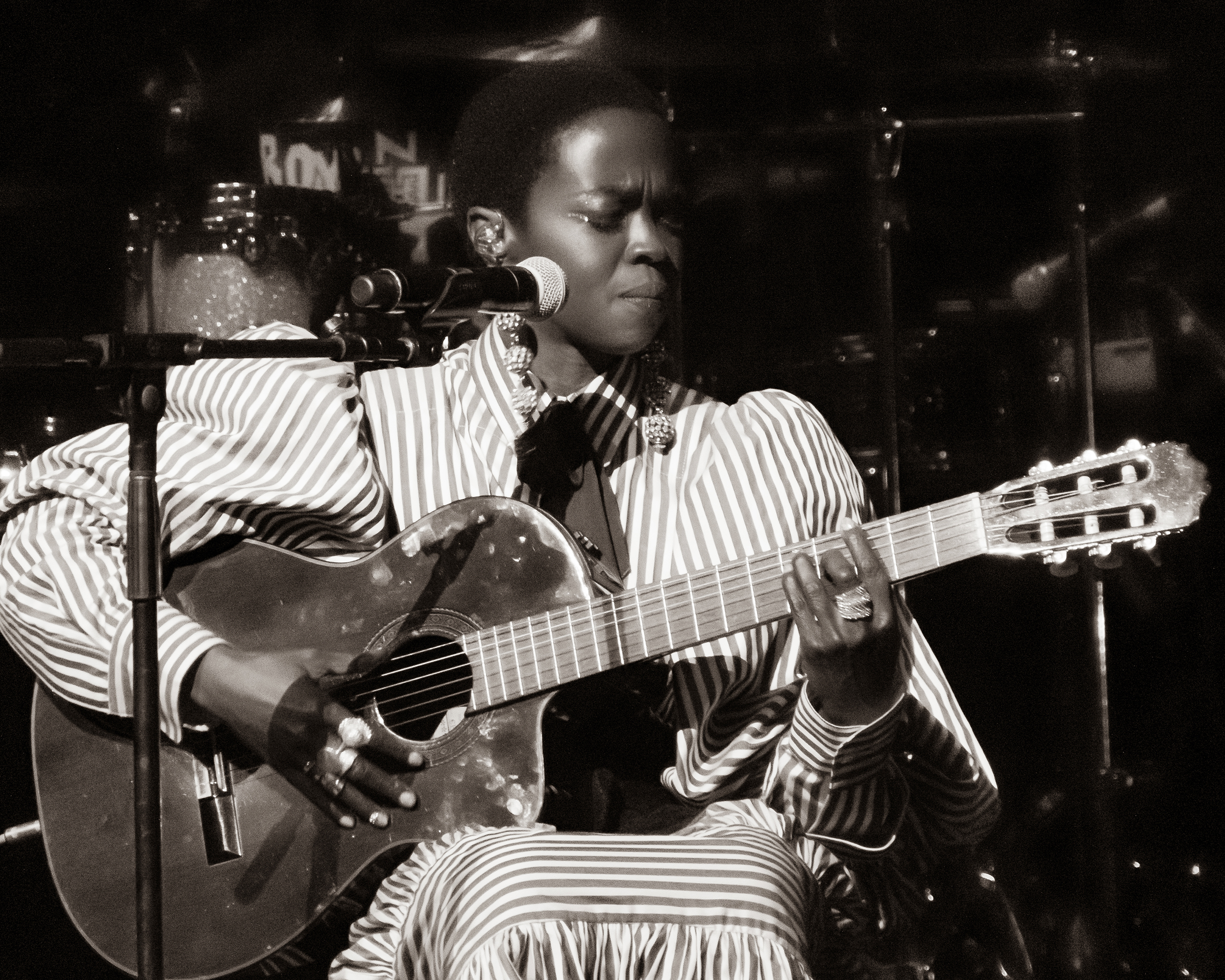
Hill performing in 2019

==== Impact ====
As a member of The Fugees, Hill contributed to the globalization of hip-hop music. Rolling Stone, In its Women Who Rock: Greatest Breakthrough Moments list, stated that she became "the biggest star in the hip-hop universe" regardless of gender, with the Fugees' album The Score. However, it was her debut studio album The Miseducation of Lauryn Hill (1998), that made the most significant impact, with Time declaring her as the "Queen of Hip Hop". Hill later became the first rapper to appear on the cover of their publication.

Her success led to wider recognition for women in hip-hop, with Billboard noting an increase of visibility among female rappers in the music industry, which author Nelson George dubbed "The Lauryn Hill Effect" in a 1999 article. Missy Elliott further commented "Latifah opened the door for doing TV, and she might have opened it for Brandy. Now, it's open for everybody." Hill was also crucial in the development of neo soul, helping expand its traditional soul boundaries to include hip-hop. Hits credited Hill with having "opened the door of neo soul" with her work on The Score. Billboard later cited her alongside Maxwell, Erykah Badu and D'Angelo, as the "harbingers of a soul music renaissance in both music and urban culture" in the early aughts.

Hill was also deemed a role model by the media. Journalists such as Danyel Smith have credited her with reshaping hip-hop's image from its negative and violent perception following the East Coast–West Coast hip-hop rivalry that led to the Murder of Tupac Shakur, and later the Murder of the Notorious B.I.G. In the description of a writer from Fast Company, "popular culture embraced Hill and plastered her face on more magazines than Tupac and Biggie combined". In 2000, Nicole Martin of The Telegraph cited her and Sean Combs as the artists who popularized hip-hop music.

Hill is often credited as the artist who popularized and helped pioneer the technique of rap-singing, which contributed to the mainstream success of melodic rap, with many modern artists like Beyoncé, Drake, Nicki Minaj and Kanye West emulating it. According to Da Brat, Hill's "sound shifted the whole game." In the wake of The Miseducation, Billboard announced it would be renaming its R&B charts to R&B/Hip-Hop Singles & Tracks and Top R&B/Hip-Hop Albums in 1999, while noting the overlap between rap and R&B audiences. Hill was the only act mentioned when citing a reason for the change, with the publication describing her as "the prime example" of an artist that blurred genre distinctions.

MTV cited artists who incorporated both rap and R&B elements such as Hill and TLC as examples, when they introduced the hip-hop category at the Video Music Awards, separate from rap. Former RIAA president Hilary Rosen named Hill as a top contributor to the blurring of lines that distinguished hip hop and R&B. Writing for The Ringer, author Musa Okwonga wrote "Decades before the ubiquity of the MC who could also croon, she could channel the greatness of Nina Simone and Rakim in the same set." Tidal Editor-in-chief Tony Gervino argued that the combination of Hill's "husky singing voice, razor-sharp flow, natural acting ability and iconic look was (and still is) the single most impressive group of positive qualities ever shoehorned into one person."

In Complex, Andy Gee commented that "the modern music landscape is dominated by artists like Drake and Nicki Minaj, who fall in the Lauryn Hill archetype as traditionalist-appeasing MCs who have records where they're singing their hearts out." XXL argued that "she set the bar high, not just for woman creators, but for anyone who wanted to rap or sing." On the song "Can Anybody Hear Me," Minaj noted that she employed the rap-singing technique that Hill helped pioneer, when auditioning for Def Jam Recordings prior to fame, but the record label rejected her and told her she "wasn't Lauryn Hill."

Over the years, Hill and The Miseducation have gained significant acclaim. The Miseducation has been recognized as one of the greatest albums by various publications, and ranked atop the list of 100 Best Albums by Apple Music. Writing for Time, music critic Brandon Tensley argued that "few artists have marked culture as profoundly as Hill did with her solo debut." Paste named her the greatest one-album artist ever. Broadcaster Trevor Nelson called her "the single most important female artist" of his generation, and further characterized her as "the second coming". Commenting on Hill's influence, Kendrick Lamar said that she "took space" for women in music, bridging the divide between mainstream success and underground credibility in R&B.

==== Influence on other artists ====
Hill has often been cited as one of the most influential entertainers of her generation. In 2021, Pitchfork named her as one of the 200 most influential artists since 1996. Many artists have named Lauryn Hill as an inspiration to their careers, including pop artists Adele, Beyoncé, Dua Lipa, Christina Aguilera, Britney Spears, Mumford & Sons, Doja Cat, H.E.R., P!nk, Alessia Cara, Kelly Clarkson, Babyface, Summer Walker, Jack Antonoff, rappers Kendrick Lamar, Kanye West, Jay-Z, Missy Elliott, Nicki Minaj, Nas, Lil' Kim, Brent Faiyaz, Rapsody, Lizzo, Doechii, Afrobeats singers Tems and Wizkid; and K-pop artists Jennie of Blackpink, CL of 2NE1, and RM of BTS.

Minaj has made mention of Hill's influence on her on multiple occasions, including on the 2020 U.S. No. 1 single "Say So Remix," In which Minaj raps, "Spittin' like Weezy, Foxy, plus Lauryn." Minaj has referred to Hill as her idol and quoted the artist in her high school yearbook.

Furthermore, musicians Erykah Badu and Jazmine Sullivan have both mentioned her as their musical hero. In addition Kehlani, once had a tattoo of Hill on her arm. Rapsody and Bebe Rexha have both cited Hill as their biggest musical inspiration, as well as UK grime rapper Stormzy naming her his biggest female musical influence. During her 2018 Grammy award acceptance speech, Spanish singer Rosalía thanked her for being influential to her.

After performing with Hill, The Weeknd described the experience as the "most important experience of my life." The 2015 production of the Broadway musical Hamilton was heavily influenced by Hill, with creator Lin-Manuel Miranda citing her as one of his favorite rappers. Miranda also referenced the track "Lost Ones" during the song "We Know," and Hill's verse from the Fugees single "Ready or Not," on the song "Helpless" from the musical. Lizzo who started her career as a rapper, later incorporated singing into her debut record. She stated in an interview in 2018, "I was always afraid of being a singer, but then when I heard Lauryn Hill, I was like, maybe I can do both," further adding that her debut album drew influence from The Miseducation of Lauryn Hill, "rapping, singing, being political."

Talent manager Nick Shymansky acknowledged The Miseducation of Lauryn Hill prompting him to search for an artist similar to Hill, which led him to discover Amy Winehouse, who eventually began working on her debut album Frank (2003) with Miseducation producer Commissioner Gordon.

In a letter to Oprah Winfrey, Clive Davis requested that Alicia Keys be booked to appear on The Oprah Winfrey Show, describing her as "the next Aretha or Whitney or Lauryn Hill". John Legend attributes his early career success and his launch into the music industry to Hill, who gave him his first major opportunity as a pianist on the song "Everything Is Everything." Hill has also been described as playing a role in the early exposure of singer Akon, who joined her Fugees musical collective Refugee Camp All-Stars. Akon later signed Lady Gaga to his label after hearing her early recordings.

Billboard stated that Hill "is to hip-hop as a gardener is to soil," and added that "the rapper/singer planted classic gems in her catalog — especially her pristine 1998 debut The Miseducation of Lauryn Hill — that have become samples for many rap game MVPs." In 2018, Hill became one of the most sampled artists of the year, when her single "Ex-Factor" was sampled on Cardi B's "Be Careful" and Drake's "Nice for What," while A$AP Rocky and Frank Ocean released "Purity", sampling "I Gotta Find Peace of Mind."

Hill's work with the Fugees has also been sampled or interpolated by countless artists, including DJ Khaled and Nas, Busta Rhymes, the Weeknd and Kendrick Lamar, Meek Mill, Jay-Z, and Mariah Carey (on the single "Save the Day," from her compilation album The Rarities). Furthermore, songs from her live album MTV Unplugged No. 2.0 have been repurposed by Frank Ocean (on the Jazmine Sullivan-featured "Rushes" from his 2016 visual album Endless), Method Man ("Say"), and Kanye West ("All Falls Down" featuring Syleena Johnson).

=== Film ===
As an actress, Hill's most memorable role was portraying Rita Watson in the 1993 film Sister Act 2: Back in the Habit. Hill's performance in the film inspired Janelle Monáe to pursue an acting career. Multiple publications have listed her performance in the film as one of the best acting performances by a rapper.

=== Touring ===
==== Tardiness in concert ====
Hill has earned a reputation for being late to her own concerts. She irritated Wyclef Jean during a short 2005 tour by failing to appear on stage with the rest of the Fugees until 45–50 minutes into the performance. At the 2007 Nice Jazz Festival, Hill was 90 minutes late for her set, and she sang too softly to be heard. She was 2.5 hours late for a Brooklyn show in August 2007: the free Martin Luther King Jr. Concert Series. In December 2010, she took the stage in Boston two-and-a-half hours late. She was two hours late in Atlanta in May 2016, performing for only 40 minutes because the venue had a strict 11 pm curfew; she explained she had been "aligning my energy with the time."

In November 2023, she was widely criticized for being late to a show in Los Angeles. She responded by saying her fans should consider themselves "lucky" that she appears on stage "every night." The comments were made a week after she said her doctors ordered her to vocal rest after she postponed a series of shows due to vocal injuries. According to Paul Meara of BET, Hill later shared an extended version of her comments that could be perceived as directed more toward the music industry than Hill's fans.

=== Fashion ===
In 2015, Vogue mentioned her as one of the female hip hop entertainers of 1990s, whose style they considered to be influential to 2010s fashion, with Emily Barasch of Vogue, writing "Lauryn Hill's sense of style endures today, as nineties nostalgia continues to pervade the runways." She was hailed as a "fashion and music icon" by CR Fashion Book and was also included on the list of the most stylish rappers of all time by Complex.

She is often named as a leading contributor in the modern popularization of the hoop earring, which first grew in popularity among black women in the 1970s, before reaching a wider audience after female hip hop artists like Hill wore them in the 1980s and 1990s. Considered as an inspiration for Kanye West's fashion, singer Solange Knowles also cited Hill among her style influences in an interview for Fashionista.

British fashion designer John Galliano chose Hill as his muse for the 2000 Spring/Summer Dior collection, he designed; The Hill-inspired collection featured models wearing dreadlocks and hoop earrings, and introduced the Dior 'Saddle Bag', which was made famous by the character Carrie Bradshaw in the television series Sex and the City; and according to Who What Wear, it is one of the ten most popular designer handbags ever. In 2017, the hip hop-based collection designed by Alexander Wang, as well as Tory Burch's resort collection, were both inspired by Hill.

The Men's Spring/Summer 2021 Louis Vuitton collection designed by Virgil Abloh, drew influence from Hill, with Abloh mentioning Hill as his "forever muse." Hill later performed at Abloh's memorial service after he died from a rare form of cancer in December 2021. She was also named among Daniel Roseberry's influences for the Spring/Summer 2022 Schiaparelli collection. Designers Esteban Cortazar, Kerby Jean-Raymond of Pyer Moss, and Humberto Leon of Kenzo, and Demna Gvasalia of Balenciaga, have also noted her as an inspiration.

== Recognition ==
=== Honorifics ===
==== Singing ====
Hill has often been cited for her vocal abilities. In 2012, VH1 named her one of the 100 Woman in Music. NPR included her on their list of the 50 Great Voices, stating that her "voice is the story of the hip-hop generation". In 2023, Rolling Stone ranked Hill at number 136 on its list of the 200 Greatest Singers of All Time. Billboard also named her one of the greatest R&B singers, in addition to Consequence ranking her as one of the greatest singers and one of the best vocalist. Rapper Ice Cube called Hill "One of the greatest voices in Black music history".

==== Rapping ====
She has often been considered one of the greatest rappers of all time and has been called the greatest female rapper. Kool Moe Dee gave Hill the highest score of any rapper on his "Report Cards" list from the book, Ego Trip's Book of Rap Lists. Beyoncé once stated that she is "one of the best hip-hop rappers ever." American Journalist Touré proclaimed that "She was—she is—the greatest female MC of all time."

In 2006, Hill was given an honorable mention on the list of "Greatest MCs of All Time" (2006) by MTV, being the only woman to be recognized on the list. She later ranked the highest amongst women on the 2013 NME reader's poll of "Greatest Rappers Ever." In 2014, AllHipHop named her the most influential woman in hip hop history.

Billboard ranked Hill seventh on their 2015 list of the "10 Best Rappers of All Time", with her being the only woman named on the list. The publication later placed Hill on their 50 Greatest Rappers of All Time list with VIBE, named her of the greatest female rappers, and included the Fugees as one of the greatest rap groups.

In 2019, Hill ranked No. 1 on the Ranker poll of the greatest singer/rappers.

=== Accolades ===
She is one of the best-selling female rappers of all time, with a reported 50 million records sold worldwide, throughout the course of her career. A trail has been named after Lauryn Hill in Saint-Jean-d'Heurs, a rural commune of France.

Hill has won numerous accolades throughout her career, including eight Grammy Awards (including Album of the Year), the most won by a female rapper. She has also received six MTV Video Music Awards (including Video of the Year), four NAACP Image Awards (including the President's Award), four Guinness World Records, three American Music Awards, and the inaugural BET Living Legend Icon Award.

Hill also achieved success as a songwriter and producer for other artists. Hill has written songs for Aretha Franklin, Mary J. Blige, CeCe Winans and produced songs for Whitney Houston and Santana, among others. In 2015, she received the Golden Note Award from American Society of Composers, Authors and Publishers (ASCAP). Hill has also won ASCAP songwriting awards for her credits on Drake's "Nice for What," Aretha Franklin's "A Rose Is Still a Rose," Cardi B's "Be Careful," Mary J. Blige's "All That I Can Say," and Kanye West's "All Falls Down." Hill was included on the reader's pick of "The Top 100 Greatest Living American Songwriters" by The New York Times.

Hill was among the inaugural 2021 nominees for the Black Music and Entertainment Walk of Fame, and was inducted in 2022. She has also been recognized by the Grammy Hall of Fame for her album The Miseducation of Lauryn Hill and her production work on the 1999 album Supernatural by Santana. In 2026, Hill was nominated for the Rock and Roll Hall of Fame.

==== Records ====
Hill won the Grammy Award for Best Rap Album as a member of the Fugees, for their album The Score, becoming the first woman to win the award. The Score also peaked at number one on the Billboard 200 chart, a first for any women in hip-hop. Her only solo studio album, The Miseducation of Lauryn Hill, also peaked at number one, making Hill the first solo female hip-hop act to reach number one on that chart. The album sold more than 422,000 copies in its first week, which had broken the record previously held by Madonna, for highest first-week sales by a female artist. Both The Miseducation of Lauryn Hill and its lead single "Doo Wop (That Thing)" debuted at number one in the U.S., making Hill the first act to have debuted at number one on both the Billboard 200 and Hot 100 with their first entries on each chart. The album also topped the Billboard Year-End Top R&B/Hip-Hop Albums chart, making it the first album by a female artist to accomplish this feat.

At the 41st Annual Grammy Awards, Hill received ten Grammy Award nominations and won five that night, including Album of the Year, with The Miseducation of Lauryn Hill being the first hip-hop album to win the award. She also set the record for most nominations for a female artist in one night, broke the record at the time previously set by Carole King for the most wins by a female artist in one night, and became the first female rapper to win the Best New Artist award. Furthermore, she also became the first black solo act to win MTV Video Music Award for Video of the Year at the 1999 MTV Video Music Awards.

In 2021, The Miseducation of Lauryn Hill was certified Diamond by the Recording Industry Association of America (RIAA), making Hill the first female hip hop artist to ever receive a Diamond certification in the United States.

== Discography ==
Solo albums

- The Miseducation of Lauryn Hill (1998)

With Fugees

- Blunted on Reality (1994)
- The Score (1996)

== Filmography ==
List of film and television roles
Year	Film	Role
1991	As the World Turns	Kira Johnson (television, recurring)
1992	Here and Now	Benita (television, single appearance)
1993	King of the Hill	Elevator Operator
1993	Sister Act 2: Back in the Habit	Rita Louise Watson
1996	ABC Afterschool Specials	Malika (television, single appearance)
1997	Restaurant	Leslie
1997	Hav Plenty	Debra (cameo)
2014	Concerning Violence	Narrator

== Tours ==
- Smokin' Grooves Tour (with Fugees, Cypress Hill, Ziggy Marley, A Tribe Called Quest, Busta Rhymes and Spearhead) (1996)
- Refugee Camp Tour (with Fugees) (1997)
- The Miseducation Tour (1999)
- Smokin' Grooves Tour (with The Roots and Outkast) (2002)
- Reunion Tour (with Fugees) (2005)
- Moving Target: Extended Intimate Playdate Series Tour (2011)
- Life Is Good / Black Rage Tour (with Nas) (2012)
- Homecoming Tour (2013–2014)
- Small Axe Tour (2015)
- MLH Caravan: A Diaspora Calling! Tour (2016–2017)
- PowerNomics Tour (with Nas) (2017)
- The Miseducation of Lauryn Hill 20th Anniversary World Tour (2018–2019)
- Ms. Lauryn Hill Live in Concert (2020)
- The Miseducation of Lauryn Hill 25th Anniversary Tour (with Fugees) (2023)

== See also ==
- List of American Grammy Award winners and nominees
- List of artists who reached number one in the United States
