= Doo Wop (That Thing) =

1998 single by Lauryn Hill

Single by Lauryn Hill

from the album The Miseducation of Lauryn Hill
- B-side: "Lost Ones"; "Forgive Them Father"; "Tell Him"; "Can't Take My Eyes Off You"
- Released: August 10, 1998
- Recorded: 1997–1998
- Studio: Marley Music (Kingston); Chung King (New York City)
- Genre: Doo-wop; hip hop; R&B
- Length: 5:20 (album version); 4:02 (single edit)
- Label: Ruffhouse; Columbia
- Songwriter: Lauryn Hill
- Producer: Lauryn Hill

Lauryn Hill singles chronology
"Retrospect for Life" (1997)	"Doo Wop (That Thing)" (1998)	"Ex-Factor" (1998)

Audio sample
- file; help

"Doo Wop (That Thing)" is a song by American rapper and singer Lauryn Hill from her debut solo studio album, The Miseducation of Lauryn Hill (1998). It was written and produced by Hill. The song was released to radio as her solo debut and lead single from The Miseducation of Lauryn Hill on August 10, 1998, by Ruffhouse Records and Columbia Records. No commercial release was originally intended for the single in the US, but limited-quantity physical formats were issued two months later, on October 27.

"Doo Wop (That Thing)" became Hill's first and only US Billboard Hot 100 number one hit. It marked the first US number one written, produced and recorded by one sole woman since Debbie Gibson's "Lost in Your Eyes" (1989). It debuted atop the Billboard Hot 100, making it the first hip hop song by a soloist to debut at number one, and the first debut single to premiere atop the chart. It also marked the first song by a female rapper to peak at number one on the Hot 100, and remained the only solo song by a female rapper to debut at number one for more than two decades, until "Super Freaky Girl" by Nicki Minaj debuted atop of the chart in 2022. The song reached number one on the R&B/Hip-Hop Airplay chart, and surpassed 50 million audience listeners on radio, which was a record at the time for a hip hop song.

Critically acclaimed, "Doo Wop (That Thing)" was named the best single of the year by Rolling Stone. It went on to win Best Female R&B Vocal Performance and Best R&B Song at the 41st Annual Grammy Awards (1999). According to Apple Music, it is one of the most streamed songs of the 1990s. The song was included in the list of "Songs of the Century", by the Recording Industry Association of America and the National Endowment for the Arts, and the list of the 300 most important songs of the 20th century by NPR. "Doo Wop (That Thing)" was ranked number 49 on Rolling Stone's 500 Greatest Songs of All Time (2021). In 2023, Billboard named it one of the "500 Best Pop Songs of All Time". It has been covered by Amy Winehouse, the cast of Glee, and Rihanna, in addition to being sampled by Drake and Kanye West.

The accompanying music video for "Doo Wop (That Thing)" won Hill four awards at the 1999 MTV Video Music Awards, including the top prize Video of the Year (a first for a rapper). VH1 and Slant have both ranked it as one of the 100 greatest music videos.

== Background ==
The hip hop and R&B song is a warning from Lauryn Hill to African-American men and women caught in "the struggle". Both the women who "[try to] be a hard rock when they really are a gem", and the men who are "more concerned with his rims, and his Timbs, than his women", are admonished by Hill, who warns them not to allow "that thing" to ruin their lives. The chorus seems to promote egalitarianism between the sexes, but the overall message of the lyrics has been described as conservative.

In terms of production value, Hill borrows heavily from elements of soul music and doo-wop, lending credence to the song's title. In its official album and single release, several of the song's lyrics are censored, though the original words can be found in the liners. The only noted semi-official release of the uncensored version is in a 12-inch promo labelled as "(Album Version)" (different from the 5:21 version) at 4 minutes in length.

== Commercial performance ==
In the United States, "Doo Wop (That Thing)" debuted at number one on the Billboard Hot 100, making it the tenth song in the chart's history to debut atop the chart. The track became the first single since Debbie Gibson's 1989 single "Lost in Your Eyes" to reach number one in the US, that was written, produced and recorded by one sole woman. Hill joined Roberta Flack, Linda Goldstein, and Sinéad O'Connor as the only women at the time to solely produce a number one single, and joined the latter three women along with Valerie Simpson and Ellie Greenwich as the sixth woman overall to produce a number one single.

It marked the first number one single by a female rapper, as well as the first rap single by a woman to debut at number one on the Billboard Hot 100 chart; Additionally, it was the first and only solo hip hop song to debut at number one, until "Not Afraid" by Eminem debuted atop the chart in 2010. "Doo Wop (That Thing)" also became the first debut single to enter atop the Hot 100 chart. Furthermore, it became the third rap single by a solo woman to reach the top 10 and was the first solo single by a woman rapper to debut within the top 40.

"Doo Wop (That Thing)" also peaked atop Billboard's Hot Rap Songs chart, making her the first unaccompanied woman artist to top both charts simultaneously, and remained the sole single by an unaccompanied female artist to do so, until it was matched by Cardi B's "Up" in 2021. The song reached number one on the R&B/Hip-Hop Airplay chart, and became the third rap song to cross 40 million listeners on radio; while it also broke the record for the most listeners on radio for a rap song, when it surpassed 46 million listeners on radio. On the R&B Singles chart, it peaked at number two for three weeks in November 1998. Despite reaching 50 million audience impressions on radio, it was held out of the top spot by "Nobody's Supposed to Be Here" by Deborah Cox.

"Doo Wop (That Thing)" remained the only single by a female rapper to debut atop the chart until Nicki Minaj's "Trollz" with 6ix9ine began at number one in 2020. While the song remained the only solo release by a woman rapper to debut at number one, until Minaj's "Super Freaky Girl" debuted atop the Hot 100, matching the feat 24 years later. It stayed at number one for two weeks in November 1998, making Hill the third woman unaccompanied by another artist to do so with a song that debuted at number one, following Mariah Carey and Celine Dion. The song set the record for the longest-running number one by an unaccompanied woman rapper, holding that record for almost 19 years, until it was surpassed by Cardi B's single "Bodak Yellow", which stayed atop the Hot 100 chart for three weeks.

The song experienced similar success abroad, reaching number one in Iceland, and peaking within the top 10 in various other countries worldwide. In the United Kingdom the song peaked at number three, debuted at number one on the UK Hip Hop and R&B Chart, and has been certified double platinum by the British Phonographic Industry. According to Apple Music, it is one of the most streamed songs of the 1990s.

== Accolades ==
At the 41st Annual Grammy Awards, "Doo Wop (That Thing)" won two awards: Best R&B Song and Best Female R&B Vocal Performance. The success of "Doo Wop (That Thing)" and The Miseducation of Lauryn Hill established Hill as a success outside of her group, The Fugees. In 1999, "Doo Wop (That Thing)" was ranked at number two on The Village Voice's Pazz & Jop annual critics' poll, after Fatboy Slim's "The Rockafeller Skank".

=== Recognition ===
"Doo Wop (That Thing)" was included at number 359 on the Songs of the Century list by the Recording Industry Association of America and the National Endowment for the Arts. NPR listed it as one of the 300 most important songs of the 20th century. The song was named as the 21st greatest hip hop song of all time by BBC, being one of the two only songs by a woman to make the list. In 2018, "Doo Wop (That Thing)" came in at number 13 on the "New American Songbook" list by Slate. In 2021, the song was ranked number 49 on Rolling Stone's 500 Greatest Songs of All Time list. "Doo Wop (That Thing)" was placed as the top song on the Rock and Roll Hall of Fame's "The 90s: Women Who Rock" Spotify playlist. Former First Lady of the United States Michelle Obama included the song on her "Day of the Girl" Spotify playlist, in honor of International Day of the Girl. XXL placed it among the 60 essential songs from women in hip hop. In August 2023, the song was ranked as the third greatest hip hop song of all time by Consequence. In October 2023, Billboard staff named "Doo Wop (That Thing)" one of the 500 Best Pop Songs of All Time.

In 2001, the song's accompanying music video was placed at number 71 on the VH1 list of the '100 Greatest Videos'. PopSugar named it the 15th most iconic music video of the 90s, while UDiscover Music listed it as one of the music videos that defined the 90s. In 2021, Slant Magazine ranked "Doo Wop (That Thing)" at number 20 on their list of the '100 Greatest Videos'. In 2023, Rolling Stone placed it on their list of the "150 Greatest Hip Hop Music Videos of All Time".

== Music video ==
The song's music video was Directed by Monty Whitebloom & Andy Delaney, Bigtv, and filmed in Manhattan's Washington Heights in New York City, with the video showing two Hills singing side by side at a block party. On the left side of the split screen, the 1967 Hill dressed in full retro-styled attire, complete with a beehive and a zebra-printed dress, she pays homage to classic R&B and doo wop, and on the right side of the screen, the 1998 Hill is shown in a homage to hip hop culture. Slant Magazine's Paul Schrodt praised the "Doo Wop (That Thing)" music video, stating "The resulting split-screen music video is the most flabbergasting testament to what the neo soul movement is all about."

The song's music video won four 1999 MTV Video Music Awards for: Best Female Video, Best R&B Video, Best Art Direction, and Video of the Year; with her win for Video of the Year, "Doo Wop (That Thing)" became the first hip hop video to win the award, and made Hill the first solo black artist to win, and second overall following TLC (1995). At the Soul Train Music Awards, the video was awarded the Michael Jackson Award for Best R&B/Soul or Rap Music Video.

== Other versions ==
=== Sampling and freestyles ===
In 2014, musician Drake sampled the song on his single "Draft Day", the song was later included on his 2019 compilation album Care Package. In 2021, Kanye West also sampled it for his single "Believe What I Say", from his tenth studio album Donda. It has also been interpolated by the recording artist Lizzo, on the song "Break Up Twice" from her fourth studio album Special.

The song's instrumental has also been used in freestyles by rappers DaBaby, and Jamaican musician Shenseea.

=== Cover versions ===
Singer Amy Winehouse covered "Doo Wop (That Thing)" as part of a mashup with her song, "He Can Only Hold Her", during live concerts from 2006 to 2008; her performance of the mashup in May 2007 at Shepherd's Bush Empire, was later included on her live album I Told You I Was Trouble: Live in London. Rihanna also covered the song while touring on Kanye West's Glow in the Dark Tour, in 2008. In 2012, R&B singer Teyana Taylor released her The Miseducation of Lauryn Hill inspired mixtape, The Misunderstanding of Teyana Taylor; the track "Lauryn's Interlude" from her mixtape features Taylor performing a shortened, a capella version of the song. English girl group Little Mix also performed an a cappella take of "Doo Wop (ThatThing)", that same year. In 2013, Quantic released a latin version of the song alongside Ana Tijoux.

Alicia Keys performed a rendition of the track during a medley with other popular songs at the 61st Annual Grammy Awards. Folk singer Devendra Banhart has also covered the song during multiple live performances, including at the music festivals, Bonnaroo and Pitchfork Music Festival. Bruno Mars sung "Doo Wop (That Thing)" during his 24K Magic World Tour.

The Glee episode "The Back-up Plan", included a cover version of the song performed by Mercedes Jones (Amber Riley) and Santana Lopez (Naya Rivera). The 2015 film Pitch Perfect 2 included a cover of the song by singer Ester Dean, who performed the hook of the song in the 'Riff Off'. Singer John Legend performed a rendition of the song on the ABC network show Greatest Hits. In 2023, rapper/singer Tobe Nwigwe released a cover version of the song for Spotify Singles.

Filipino rapper Francis Magalona released a Filipino version titled "Bading ang Dating" (lit. 'It Looks Gay')

== In other media ==
In 2021, author Minda Harts published her second book, Right Within: How We Heal From Racial Trauma in the Workplace, inspired by a verse in the song. TIME magazine named it one of the "8 New Books You Should Read" in October 2021.

== Track listings ==
US CD and cassette single

1. "Doo Wop (That Thing)"
2. "Lost Ones" (remix)

US maxi-CD single

1. "Doo Wop (That Thing)" (radio edit)
2. "Lost Ones" (album version)
3. "Lost Ones" (remix)
4. "Doo Wop (That Thing)" (instrumental)
5. "Doo Wop (That Thing)" (a cappella)

UK CD1

1. "Doo Wop (That Thing)" (radio edit)
2. "Doo Wop (That Thing)" (Gordon's dub)
3. "Doo Wop (That Thing)" (instrumental)

UK CD2

1. "Doo Wop (That Thing)" (album version)
2. "Lost Ones"
3. "Forgive Them Father"

UK cassette single and European CD single

1. "Doo Wop (That Thing)" (radio edit)
2. "Lost Ones"

Australian CD single

1. "Doo Wop (That Thing)" (radio edit) – 4:00
2. "Lost Ones" – 5:33
3. "Doo Wop (That Thing)" (Gordon's dub) – 4:00
4. "Tell Him" (live) – 4:40
5. "Can't Take My Eyes Off You" – 4:03

Japanese CD single

1. "Doo Wop (That Thing)" (album version)
2. "Doo Wop (That Thing)" (radio edit)
3. "Doo Wop (That Thing)" (Gordon's dub)
4. "Doo Wop (That Thing)" (a cappella)

== Credits and personnel ==
Credits are taken from The Miseducation of Lauryn Hill album booklet.

Studios

- Recorded at Marley Music, Inc. (Kingston, Jamaica) and Chung King Studios (New York City)
- Mixed at Sony Music Studios (New York City)
- Mastered at Powers House of Sound (New York City)

Personnel

- Lauryn Hill – writing, lead vocals, production, arrangement
- Lenesha Randolph – background vocals
- Jeni Fujita – background vocals
- Rasheem "Kilo" Pugh – background vocals
- Fundisha Johnson – background vocals
- James Poyser – background vocals, piano, Rhodes, celesta, Wurlitzer, electric piano
- Ché Guevara – drum programming
- Vada Nobles – additional drum programming
- DJ Supreme – DJ elements
- Everol Wray – trumpet
- Nambo Robinson – trombone
- Dean Fraser – saxophone
- Indigo Quartet – strings
- Commissioner Gordon – recording, mixing, mix engineering
- Warren Riker – recording
- Errol Brown – recording assistant
- Storm Jefferson – recording assistant
- Herb Powers, Jr. – mastering

== Charts ==
=== Weekly charts ===
Chart (1998–1999)	Peak position
Australia (ARIA)	35
Australia (ARIA) with "Can't Take My Eyes Off You"	8
Austria (Ö3 Austria Top 40)	33
Belgium (Ultratop 50 Flanders)	35
Belgium (Ultratop 50 Wallonia)	15
Canada Top Singles (RPM)	2
Canada Dance/Urban (RPM)	4
Europe (European Hot 100 Singles)	14
France (SNEP)	23
Germany (GfK)	17
Iceland (Íslenski Listinn Topp 40)	1
Ireland (IRMA)	12
Netherlands (Dutch Top 40)	4
Netherlands (Single Top 100)	4
Scottish Singles Sales (Official Charts)	14
Sweden (Sverigetopplistan)	39
Switzerland (Schweizer Hitparade)	10
UK Singles (Official Charts)	3
UK Hip Hop/R&B (Official Charts)	1
US Billboard Hot 100	1
US Hot R&B/Hip-Hop Songs (Billboard)	2
US Hot Rap Songs (Billboard)	1
US Pop Airplay (Billboard)	29
US Rhythmic Airplay (Billboard)	1

=== Year-end charts ===
Chart (1998)	Position
Canada Dance (RPM)	9
Europe (Eurochart Hot 100)	84
Germany (Media Control)	97
Iceland (Íslenski Listinn Topp 40)	5
Netherlands (Dutch Top 40)	45
Netherlands (Single Top 100)	68
UK Singles (OCC)	86
UK Urban (Music Week)	8
US Hot R&B Singles (Billboard)	79
US Hot Rap Singles (Billboard)	34
US Rhythmic Top 40 (Billboard)	40

Chart (1999)	Position
Australia (ARIA)	67
Brazil (Crowley)	87
US Billboard Hot 100	41
US Hot R&B/Hip-Hop Singles & Tracks (Billboard)	40
US Hot Rap Singles (Billboard)	12
US Mainstream Top 40 (Billboard)	60
US Rhythmic Top 40 (Billboard)	33

== Certifications ==
Region	Certification	Certified units/sales
Australia (ARIA)	2× Platinum	140,000^{‡}
Denmark (IFPI Danmark)	Gold	45,000^{‡}
New Zealand (RMNZ)	3× Platinum	90,000^{‡}
United Kingdom (BPI)	2× Platinum	1,200,000^{‡}
United States (RIAA)	Gold	500,000^{^}
^{^} Shipments figures based on certification alone.^{‡} Sales+streaming figures based on certification alone.

== Release history ==
Release dates and formats for "Doo Wop (That Thing)"
Region	Date	Format(s)	Label(s)	Ref.
United States	August 10, 1998	Rhythmic contemporary radio	Ruffhouse; Columbia	
United States	August 24, 1998	Urban contemporary radio	Ruffhouse; Columbia	
Japan	September 9, 1998	Maxi CD	Sony Music Japan	
United Kingdom	September 21, 1998	Cassette; two maxi CDs	Columbia	
France	October 5, 1998	CD	Small	
United States	October 20, 1998	Contemporary hit radio	Ruffhouse; Columbia	
United States	October 27, 1998	7-inch vinyl; 12-inch vinyl; cassette; CD; maxi CD	Ruffhouse; Columbia	
