= Everything Is Everything (Lauryn Hill song) =

1999 single by Lauryn Hill

- US editions cover

Single by Lauryn Hill

from the album The Miseducation of Lauryn Hill
- Released: May 3, 1999
- Studio: Sony (New York City)
- Genre: R&B; hip-hop soul
- Length: 4:57
- Label: Ruffhouse; Columbia
- Songwriters: Lauryn Hill; Johari Newton
- Producer: Lauryn Hill

Lauryn Hill singles chronology
"Ex-Factor" (1999)	"Everything Is Everything" (1999)	"Turn Your Lights Down Low" (1999)

"Everything Is Everything" is a song recorded by American singer-songwriter Lauryn Hill. The song was released as the third and final single from her debut album The Miseducation of Lauryn Hill (1998) on May 3, 1999, by Ruffhouse Records and Columbia Records. It was produced by Hill, who co-wrote it alongside Johari Newton. During the recording sessions, Hill wanted to write about injustice and struggles amongst youth communities in inner city areas of the United States. It marked the first commercial appearance of singer and pianist John Legend, who was 19 years old when he played the piano on the song.

"Everything Is Everything" garnered acclaim from critics, many of whom praised its lyrical themes and genre variance. It became a Top 40 hit in the United States, and was certified gold by the Recording Industry Association of America (RIAA). Internationally, the song became a chart success in New Zealand and the United Kingdom. "Everything Is Everything" received a nomination for a Soul Train Lady of Soul Award, and was also nominated for a Grammy Award for Best Female R&B Vocal Performance, however that nomination was revoked due to the song being released in the previous eligibility period. It was later covered by The Roots and Booker T. Jones for the album The Road from Memphis (2011).

The accompanying music video for "Everything Is Everything" was directed by Sanji, and filmed in the Method Studios in Los Angeles. It depicted Hill walking throughout New York City, which is shown as a vinyl record spinning on the axis of a turntable. At the 42nd Annual Grammy Awards (2000), it was nominated for Best Short Form Music Video. It also received three MTV Video Music Award nominations, including Best Hip Hop Video. In 2010, Pitchfork ranked it one of the "Top 50 Music Videos of the 1990s".

== Critical reception ==
"Everything Is Everything" received widespread critical acclaim, both upon its release and retrospectively. In 2008, About.com ranked it at number 66 on their "100 Greatest Rap Songs" list. In 2018, Complex ranked the song at number two on their list of the 20 greatest Lauryn Hill songs, and in 2022, American Songwriter ranked the song at number four on their list of the ten greatest Lauryn Hill songs.

== Commercial performance ==
"Everything Is Everything" reached number 35 on the US Billboard Hot 100, spending 18 weeks on the chart. It peaked at number 14 on the Hot R&B Singles & Tracks chart, spending 24 weeks on the chart. The song also peaked at number 18 on the Rhythmic Top 40, where it charted for 14 weeks. Internationally, it peaked at number 20 on the UK Singles Chart, also reaching the top 20 in New Zealand, where it peaked at number 15. A month after its release as a single, the song was certified gold by the Recording Industry Association of America (RIAA), denoting shipments of 500,000 units in the United States.

== Music video ==
The accompanying music video for "Everything Is Everything" was directed by Sanji. The video depicted Hill on the streets of New York City, which is seen as a huge vinyl record on a turntable spinning around playing the music. She runs down the street in various scenes and stages sidestepping the turntable needle as it scratches back and forth through the city until the end; Hill stands on the spinning record appearing in her name on the label.

The video made its television debut on BET and VH1 during the week ending June 20, 1999. The following week, the video debuted on MTV and The Box. Critically acclaimed, it was nominated for Best Short Form Music Video at the 42nd Annual Grammy Awards (2000). The same year, it also received a Soul Train Lady of Soul Award nomination and three MTV Video Music Award nominations–Best Hip-Hop Video, Best Direction, and Best Special Effects.

== Track listings and formats ==
UK CD1 single

1. "Everything Is Everything" (radio edit) – 3:56
2. "Ex-Factor" (live on Radio 1) – 6:51
3. "Everything Is Everything" (instrumental) – 4:57

UK CD2 single

1. "Everything Is Everything" (album version) – 4:57
2. "Lost Ones" (live on Radio 1) – 5:13
3. "Tell Him" (live on Radio 1) – 4:40

US maxi CD single

1. "Everything Is Everything" (radio edit) – 3:56
2. "Everything Is Everything" (album version) – 4:57
3. "Everything Is Everything" (instrumental) – 4:57
4. "Ex-Factor" (A Simple Mix) – 4:37
5. "Ex-Factor" (A Simple Breakdown) – 4:10

== Credits and personnel ==
Credits adapted from the liner notes of The Miseducation of Lauryn Hill.

- Lauryn Hill – vocals, production, songwriting
- Johari Newton – songwriting
- John Legend – piano

== Charts ==
=== Weekly charts ===
Chart (1999)	Peak position
Belgium (Ultratip Bubbling Under Flanders)	13
Europe (European Hot 100 Singles)	73
Netherlands (Dutch Top 40)	33
Netherlands (Single Top 100)	51
New Zealand (Recorded Music NZ)	15
Scottish Singles Sales (Official Charts)	30
UK Singles (Official Charts)	20
UK Hip Hop/R&B (Official Charts)	5
US Billboard Hot 100	35
US Hot R&B/Hip-Hop Songs (Billboard)	14
US Rhythmic Airplay (Billboard)	18

=== Year-end charts ===
Chart (1999)	Position
US Hot R&B/Hip-Hop Singles & Tracks (Billboard)	62
US Rhythmic Top 40 (Billboard)	71

== Certifications ==
Certifications and sales for "Everything Is Everything"
Region	Certification	Certified units/sales
New Zealand (RMNZ)	Gold	15,000^{‡}
United Kingdom (BPI)	Silver	200,000^{‡}
United States (RIAA)	Gold	500,000^{^}
^{^} Shipments figures based on certification alone.^{‡} Sales+streaming figures based on certification alone.

== Release history ==
Release dates and formats for "Everything Is Everything"
Region	Date	Format(s)	Label(s)	Ref.
United States	May 3, 1999	Urban contemporary radio	Ruffhouse; Columbia	
United States	June 8, 1999	Contemporary hit radio	Ruffhouse; Columbia	
United Kingdom	June 28, 1999	Cassette; two maxi CDs	Columbia	
United States	June 29, 1999	7-inch vinyl; 12-inch vinyl; cassette; CD; maxi CD	Ruffhouse; Columbia	
France	July 5, 1999	Maxi CD	Small	
