= Billboard and Vibe's 50 Greatest Rappers of All Time =

List of greatest rappers

"The 50 Greatest Rappers of All Time" is a music editorial and ranking of the finest rappers in history, published by the American magazines Billboard and Vibe in February 2023. Billboard initially published a list of the "10 Greatest Rappers" in November 2015. The ranking was later revised with Vibe to celebrate the 50th anniversary of hip hop music's inception and was compiled by the magazines' respective editorial boards, expanding the list to include 50 rappers. To determine the rankings, the boards created a list of criteria based on a rapper's artistry, achievements, and cultural influence. It received criticism due to its exclusion of rappers who are not based in North America, as well as the omission of dancehall and reggaeton artists.

Billboard's original list ranked The Notorious B.I.G. as the greatest rapper of all time, with Lauryn Hill being the sole woman on the list. Billboard and Vibe presented the first set of rappers on the revised list on January 11, 2023, and ten more rappers were announced over the course of three weeks. The top rankings were unveiled on February 8, 2023, which crowned Jay-Z the greatest rapper of all time and Nicki Minaj the greatest female rapper of all time.

It sparked multiple debates within the hip hop industry, many of whom criticized the publications and artists featured in the premier positions.

== Background ==
Billboard initially created a list of the 10 greatest rappers of all time in November 2015, with the top position held by The Notorious B.I.G. The publication revised their rankings in 2023, via a partnership with Vibe, to celebrate the 50th anniversary of hip hop. The updated list, published in stages between January 11 and February 8, 2023, expanded their reach to include the top 50 rappers of all time, instead of 10. The rankings were based on the votes of ten journalists who were a part of Billboard and Vibe's editorial boards, and was led by Datwon Thomas, the editor-in-chief of Vibe. To "keep [the] pool of nominees a little more focused," the journalists chose to exclude dancehall and reggaeton artists and only center on rappers based in North America, regardless of merit.

The editorial boards then ranked the qualifying rappers based on the following criteria:

- Body of work / achievements (the amount of charted music, certifications, and honors a rapper has received)
- Cultural impact / influence (the significant contributions a rapper has made to nurture hip hop's evolution)
- Longevity (the length of a rapper's career)
- Lyricism (the songwriting abilities a rapper possesses)
- Flow (how a rapper implements rhythm and rhyme schemes in their delivery)

Acknowledging that lists tend to "draw their share of criticism and praise from industry pundits and the public alike," the rankings were heavily discussed and deliberated amongst the editorial boards in order to rationalize a "well-thought-out, authentic, list that reflects hip hop's foundational pioneers, evolutionary trailblazers, and contemporary mainstays."

== Top 10 rappers ==
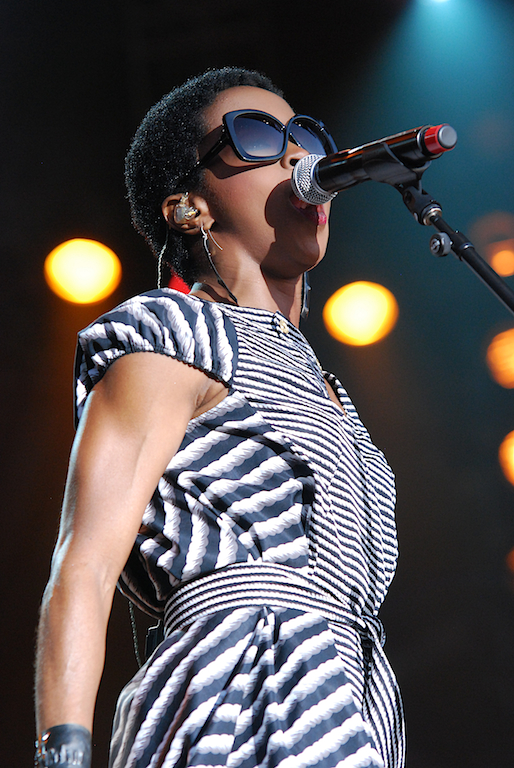
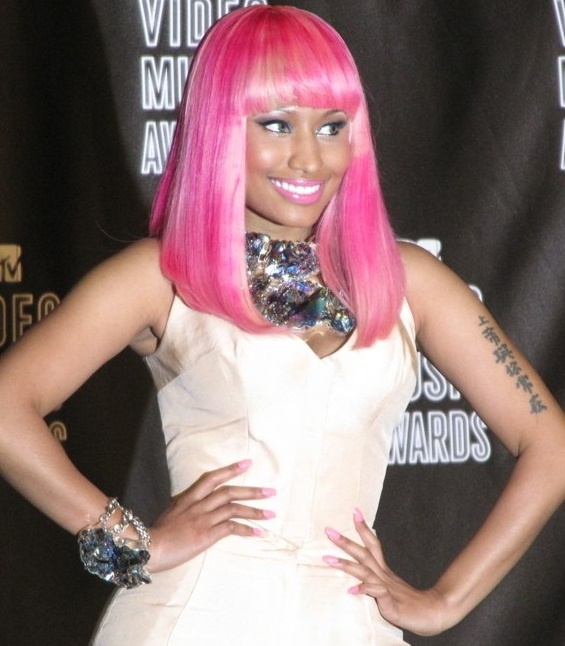
Lauryn Hill was named the greatest female rapper of all time on the original list in 2015, ranking 7th overall; however, in the updated 2023 list, Nicki Minaj was ranked 10th while Hill was removed, resulting in Minaj becoming the highest ranked female rapper.

=== 2015 list ===
Rank	Name	Lifetime
1	The Notorious B.I.G.	May 21, 1972 – March 9, 1997
2	Jay-Z	December 4, 1969 – present
3	Eminem	October 17, 1972 – present
4	Rakim	January 28, 1968 – present
5	Nas	September 14, 1973 – present
6	André 3000	May 27, 1975 – present
7	Lauryn Hill	May 26, 1975 – present
8	Ghostface Killah	May 9, 1970 – present
9	Kendrick Lamar	June 17, 1987 – present
10	Lil Wayne	September 27, 1982 – present

=== 2023 list ===
Rank	Name	Lifetime
1	Jay-Z	December 4, 1969 – present
2	Kendrick Lamar	June 17, 1987 – present
3	Nas	September 14, 1973 – present
4	Tupac Shakur	June 16, 1971 – September 13, 1996
5	Eminem	October 17, 1972 – present
6	The Notorious B.I.G.	May 21, 1972 – March 9, 1997
7	Lil Wayne	September 27, 1982 – present
8	Drake	October 24, 1986 – present
9	Snoop Dogg	October 20, 1971 – present
10	Nicki Minaj	December 8, 1982 – present

=== Statistics ===
- Eminem, Jay-Z, Kendrick Lamar, Lil Wayne, Nas, and The Notorious B.I.G. are the only rappers to be featured in both versions of the list.
- Nicki Minaj and Lauryn Hill are the only female rappers to be included in the top rankings of the lists.
- Nicki Minaj (Trinidadian) and Drake (Canadian) are the only non-American artists to be featured in the top ten of the 2023 revision.
- On both versions of the list, Kendrick Lamar is the youngest rapper spotlighted in the top ten.

== Reception ==
=== 2015 list ===
Much of the criticism surrounding Billboard's 2015 list was centered around the exclusion of Tupac Shakur. Many journalists also believed that including Lamar on the list was premature, and that the writers involved with the rankings showed favoritism instead of following a specific metric. Snoop Dogg found the list to be disrespectful, while The Game created his own version after sharing his own vitriol. Tyga described the list as dated and argued that Drake and J. Cole should have been included. Ghostface Killah, who was ranked the eighth-greatest, was appreciative of his placement.

=== 2023 list ===
Curtis Roberts of We Got This Covered believed that it was a mistake of Billboard and Vibe to create the "head-scratching" list due to the publications prioritizing a rapper's popularity over their content. He highlighted Billboard's reputation as "the go-to domestic hit-ranking metric in the industry" and the updated rules to their albums and songs charts as a case of the magazine's alleged favoritism towards certain artists. Roberts also disagreed with Jay-Z's placement as the greatest rapper of all time, arguing that he deserved to be ranked amongst the most popular rappers instead. Ice Cube, who was ranked the 18th greatest rapper, called the list "irrelevant" and compared the rankings to "assholes: everybody got one and they all stink." He further denounced Billboard and their lack of hip hop knowledge, saying: "Billboard ain't hip hop, so their opinion don't matter. So who gives a fuck?" Ice Cube was not concerned with his placement, but criticized Billboard and Vibe for their exclusion of Too Short, citing it as an undeserved snub. Ja Rule, who was also omitted from the list, responded to the list via social media, writing: "There ain't 50 rappers dead, alive or waiting to be born better than me. [...] Congrats to everyone on the list, but check my résumé." Charlamagne tha God felt that it was too early for Kendrick Lamar and Drake to be mentioned among the greatest of all time.

Missy Elliott, who was ranked the 19th greatest rapper, shared her thoughts on the list during an interview with Billboard, saying: "Sometimes, even if you think you’re great, you still look around and see so many icons and legends in this list, and you’re just humbled to be a part of that list. And to be in the top 20 when talking about that many people. I am blessed. I am thankful, and yeah, it feels good." Lamar approved of his placement via his guest appearance on the standalone version of Beyoncé's "America Has a Problem", with the lines: "Billboard, they know / After HOV, rightfully so". Lil Wayne argued that he should have topped the rankings, speaking with Zane Lowe for Apple Music 1: "I will tell you that I am a motherfucking one. Everybody whose names you named, they also know I’m number one. Go ask ’em. They know what it is."

==== Melle Mel comments ====
During an interview with The Art of Dialogue, Melle Mel, who was ranked the 48th greatest rapper of all time, commended Eminem and Lamar as capable rappers, but questioned their influence on hip hop culture. He further argued that Eminem is only considered to be amongst the best because he is white, and that Lamar's music does not resonate with vital aspects of contemporary hip hop. Additional criticism was aimed towards Nicki Minaj's placement and Lil Wayne's artistry. Melle Mel's remarks polarized the hip hop industry. Fat Joe, Kevin Gates, and 50 Cent criticized his comments about Eminem, while Chuck D offered an explanation for his critiques. Citing his longevity as a prime example, he compared Melle Mel to basketball player Wilt Chamberlain and how he would often criticize newer generations of players.

Following accusations of being racist, Melle Mel defended his comments via his podcast, Hip Hop Center. He argued that he does not have any animosity towards his peers, but his comments were stemmed from Billboard and Vibe's rankings. He criticized the publications for creating the list due to their lack of notability in hip hop, adding that "they’re known for records. So obviously, Billboard is more leaning toward guys that made records, compared to guys like myself that put in all the time in hip hop." He called it "almost impossible" for him to be racist, and used Eminem's songs where he acknowledged his white privilege to justify his remarks. "If he basically said what I said, we said very similar things, how could what he say not be racist but then what I said was racist? In other words, if he’s right for saying what he’s saying, then the only reason that I could be wrong is that I’m black and I said it." During his guest appearance on Ez Mil's single "Realest", Eminem dissed Melle Mel and claimed that his race works against him in the hip hop industry.
