= Ex-Factor =

1998 single by Lauryn Hill

Single by Lauryn Hill

from the album The Miseducation of Lauryn Hill
- B-side: "When It Hurts So Bad"; "Lost Ones"; "Can't Take My Eyes Off You"
- Released: December 14, 1998
- Studio: Chung King (New York City); RPM (New York City); Tuff Gong (Kingston)
- Genre: Soul
- Length: 5:27
- Label: Ruffhouse; Columbia
- Songwriters: Lauryn Hill; Robert Diggs; Gary Grice; Russell Jones; Clifford Smith; Corey Woods; Dennis Coles; Jason Hunter; Lamont Hawkins; Elgin Turner; Alan Bergman; Marilyn Bergman; Marvin Hamlisch
- Producer: Lauryn Hill

Lauryn Hill singles chronology
"Doo Wop (That Thing)" (1998)	"Ex-Factor" (1998)	"Everything Is Everything" (1999)

"Ex-Factor" is a song by American singer Lauryn Hill for her debut solo studio album The Miseducation of Lauryn Hill (1998). Written and produced by Hill herself, it is a soul song. The song features a sample of "Can It Be All So Simple" by Wu-Tang Clan, hence its songwriters are also credited. It has been claimed to be about Hill's former Fugees groupmate Wyclef Jean. The song was released as the second single from The Miseducation of Lauryn Hill on December 14, 1998, by Ruffhouse Records and Columbia Records.

Upon its release, "Ex-Factor" received widespread critical acclaim, with SPIN naming it the third best single of 1999. A commercial success, the song became a Top 40 hit on the US Billboard Hot 100, peaking at number seven on the Hot R&B/Hip-Hop Songs, and reaching the top five on the UK singles chart. It won the Best R&B/Soul Single - Female award at the 2000 Soul Train Music Awards.

Various publications have named it one of the best R&B songs of the 1990s, while both Time and The Ringer have ranked it among the greatest breakup songs of all time. In June 2026, CBS News included the song in its list of the 250 essential American songs of the past 250 years. Since its release, "Ex-Factor" has been cited as an inspiration for the writing of films like Love & Basketball (2000) and Sinners (2025). It has also been sampled numerous times, most notably on Drake's "Nice For What" and Cardi B's "Be Careful", additionally artists such as Beyoncé and Kelly Clarkson have covered the song during live performances.

== Music and lyrics ==
"Ex-Factor" was written and produced by Lauryn Hill. It features replayed elements of "Can It Be All So Simple" by Wu-Tang Clan, which itself samples Gladys Knight & the Pips' cover of Barbra Streisand's "The Way We Were", written by Alan and Marilyn Bergman and Marvin Hamlisch. Consequently, Wu-Tang Clan, the Bergmans, and Hamlisch are also credited as songwriters of "Ex-Factor". (Note: Original liner notes of The Miseducation of Lauryn Hill credit solely Hill. Songwriters of sampled recordings would later be credited on the album's digital editions.)

"Ex-Factor" is a soul number which serves as a painful dissection of a failing relationship. The accompaniment is driven by two-chord progressions all throughout its melodic variations. Its refrain contains soaring harmonies.

== Commercial performance ==
"Ex-Factor", although not as successful as Hill's previous single "Doo Wop (That Thing)", still entered several international charts. It spent 22 weeks on the US Billboard Hot 100, peaking at number 21 on the chart dated April 10, 1999. The song peaked atop the US R&B/Hip-Hop Airplay. It also charted on the US Hot R&B/Hip-Hop Songs, spending 31 weeks and peaking at number seven on March 13, 1999. It reached number four on the UK Singles Chart and spent 16 weeks on the chart, remaining Hill's biggest hit in the United Kingdom to date.

== Cultural impact ==
=== Cover versions and samples ===
Over the years, the song has been sampled in rapper Lil B's "Money Over Suckas" (2012), singer Kehlani's "Till the Morning" (2014), and Omarion's "Show Me" (2014) featuring Jeremih. In 2018, "Ex-Factor" gained renewed interest when Drake sampled it on his chart topping single "Nice for What". Cardi B also interpolated the song's lyrics for her single "Be Careful", which reached number one on the Billboard Rhythmic Songs chart, that same year.

The song has been performed in live covers by artists including Kelly Clarkson, John Legend, and H.E.R. Beyoncé has frequently included the song in her concert setlists, particularly during her On the Run Tour. Comedian Dave Chappelle criticized the music industry's handling of Hill's catalog, expressing disappointment that Hill herself could not legally perform in the same arrangement as Beyoncé's version. Hill publicly praised the singer's rendition in a Twitter post.

A stripped down rendition of the song was featured in a medley performed by Justin Timberlake's background vocalists, during his 2018 The Man of the Woods Tour.

=== Inspiration for artists, tributes and playlists ===
Filmmaker Gina Prince-Bythewood has stated that she listened to "Ex-Factor" when writing the climax of Love & Basketball (2000) and also cited it as an inspiration for her film The Woman King (2022). Actor Jonathan Majors used the song in his character preparation playlist for his portrayal of Kang the Conqueror in Ant-Man and the Wasp: Quantumania (2023). Hailee Steinfeld and Michael B. Jordan also used the song to build the emotional development of their characters in Sinners (2025), with the film's director Ryan Coogler praising the song as one of his favorites. In an interview with Nardwuar, Timothée Chalamet praised a 2023 live performance of the song as "one of the most beautiful things [he'd] ever seen". Actor Jussie Smollett said that he performed the song during his audition for the television series Empire.

The song has been selected for numerous curated playlists. In a 2009 appearance on BBC Radio 2's Tracks of My Years, Beyoncé selected "Ex-Factor" as one of her all-time favorite songs, describing it as "so passionate" and "infectious", adding "I could listen to it over and over again". Adele also included the song at the top of her ITunes playlist, writing, "I love the lyrics in this song, and I think her voice is incredible! The Miseducation album is my favourite album ever".

Christina Aguilera included it in her Women's History Month playlist honoring female artists. Jay-Z named it as one of the songs that inspired his 2017 album 4:44. Khalid included "Ex-Factor" in a playlist for Billboard highlighting Black music innovators who influenced his career. Alicia Keys selected the song for her Teen Vogue "Playlist of My Life", describing it as a formative influence and commented "Ex-Factor has super, super good memories for me… I feel like Lauryn really was a mentor to me, and a woman who was just in her power". Rapper Tierra Whack recalled hearing "Ex-Factor" in her youth and being introduced to the word "reciprocity".

Chika, Brent Faiyaz, American skateboarder Beatrice Domond, and model Kendall Jenner have each included the track in personal playlists or cited it as a favorite. It also appeared in an Apple Music commercial starring Mary J. Blige, Taraji P. Henson, and Kerry Washington, where Washington selected the song as her go-to heartbreak anthem.

=== Fashion and beauty ===
In 2018, Hill collaborated with American clothing brand Woolrich on a capsule collection. Hill was featured in a promotional video performing "Ex-Factor" at the Apollo Theater while wearing outerwear printed with her image. She also performed "Ex-Factor" during the Louis Vuitton Spring-Summer 2021 menswear show. The song was included in a set that was pre-recorded and directed by Naima Ramos-Chapman.

In 2021, make-up artist AJ Crimson launched a lipstick line inspired by the 1990s, and named one of the deepest brown shades after "Ex-Factor". In an interview with Essence, Crimson credited Lauryn Hill with popularizing rich brown lipstick, calling her a "trendsetter" who made the shade "sexy, neutral and empowering".

== Track listings and formats ==
- US 7-inch single

A. "Ex-Factor" (radio edit) – 4:38
B. "When It Hurts So Bad" (album version) – 5:42

- UK CD1
1. "Ex-Factor" (album version) – 5:27
2. "Ex-Factor" (Part II remix) – 4:38
3. "Ex-Factor" (A Simple Mix) – 4:37
- UK CD2
1. "Ex-Factor" (radio edit) – 4:38
2. "Ex-Factor" (A Simple Breakdown) – 4:10
3. "Lost Ones" (remix) – 4:17
- UK cassette single
1. "Ex-Factor"
2. "Can't Take My Eyes Off You"
- European CD1
1. "Ex-Factor" (radio edit) – 4:38
2. "Ex-Factor" (A Simple Mix) – 4:37
- European CD2
1. "Ex-Factor" (radio edit) – 4:38
2. "Ex-Factor" (A Simple Breakdown) – 4:10
3. "Lost Ones" – 4:17
4. "Ex-Factor" (A Simple Mix) – 4:37
- Japanese CD single
1. "Ex-Factor"
2. "Ex-Factor" (remix)
3. "Lost Ones" (remix)

== Credits and personnel ==
Credits are adapted from The Miseducation of Lauryn Hill liner notes.

- Leads and background vocals: Lauryn Hill
- Additional background: Chuck Young
- Bass: Paul Fakhourie
- Piano: Tejumold Newton
- Wurlitzer, organ and rhodes: James Poyser
- Percussion: Rudy Byrd
- Guitar: Johari Newton
- Drum programming by Vada Nobles
- Recorded by Commissioner Gordon
- Mixed by Commissioner Gordon
- Assistant recording engineer: Chip Verspyck
- Assistant mix engineer: Greg Thompson
- Recorded at RPM Studios, (NYC), Marley Music, Inc. (Kingston, Jamaica) and Chung King Studios (NYC)
- Mixed at Hit Factory Studios and Chung King Studios (NYC)

== Charts ==
=== Weekly charts ===
Chart (1999)	Peak position
Belgium (Ultratip Bubbling Under Flanders)	8
Europe (Eurochart Hot 100)	18
France (SNEP)	51
Germany (GfK)	52
Iceland (Íslenski Listinn Topp 40)	3
Ireland (IRMA)	19
Italy Airplay (Music & Media)	7
Netherlands (Dutch Top 40 Tipparade)	2
Netherlands (Single Top 100)	40
Scottish Singles Sales (Official Charts)	11
Sweden (Sverigetopplistan)	46
Switzerland (Schweizer Hitparade)	22
UK Singles (Official Charts)	4
UK Hip Hop/R&B (Official Charts)	1
US Billboard Hot 100	21
US Hot R&B/Hip-Hop Songs (Billboard)	7
US Rhythmic Airplay (Billboard)	9

=== Year-end charts ===
Chart (1999)	Position
Romania (Romanian Top 100)	77
UK Singles (OCC)	123
US Billboard Hot 100	62
US Hot R&B/Hip-Hop Singles & Tracks (Billboard)	12

== Certifications ==
Certifications and sales for "Ex-Factor"
Region	Certification	Certified units/sales
Denmark (IFPI Danmark)	Gold	45,000^{‡}
New Zealand (RMNZ)	3× Platinum	90,000^{‡}
United Kingdom (BPI)	Platinum	600,000^{‡}
^{‡} Sales+streaming figures based on certification alone.

== Release history ==
Release dates and formats for "Ex-Factor"
Region	Date	Format(s)	Label(s)	Ref.
United States	December 14, 1998	Urban contemporary radio	Ruffhouse; Columbia	
Japan	December 23, 1998	Maxi CD	Sony Music Japan	
United States	January 19, 1999	7-inch vinyl	Ruffhouse; Columbia	
Germany	January 25, 1999	Maxi CD	Sony Music	
United Kingdom	February 15, 1999	Cassette; two maxi CDs	Columbia	
France	March 1, 1999	12-inch vinyl	Small	
France	April 20, 1999	CD	Small	
