= Black Rage (song) =

"Black Rage (sketch)"

Song by Lauryn Hill
- Length: 3:46
- Songwriter: Lauryn Hill

"Black Rage (sketch)" is a protest song by American recording artist Lauryn Hill. The song takes its melody from the Rodgers and Hammerstein classic "My Favorite Things"; however, its lyrics feature a much darker undertone and reflect on the history of racism in the United States.

== Background and release ==
Hill originally debuted the song as a spoken-word poem during her "Life is Good/Black Rage" tour with American rapper Nas in 2012. It was later recorded and released on SoundCloud on August 20, 2014, during the Ferguson unrest that erupted following the police killing of Michael Brown. The song was dedicated to Ferguson protesters.

== Composition and themes ==
"Black Rage" is a reworking of the song "My Favorite Things" from the Rodgers and Hammerstein musical The Sound of Music (1959). While the two songs share the same melody, Hill's rendition stands in stark contrast to the original's cheerful tone. The lyrics address the obstacles faced by Black people in the United States due to racism, educational inequality, racial violence, and psychological trauma. These sources of "Black Rage" transform the uplifting tune into a haunting critique of systemic oppression. As Slate observed, the song functions as both a lament and a call to action, blending deeply personal experiences with broader political statements. The song reflects Hill's continued use of her music as a tool for activism, following a tradition of African-American protest music that stretches back to the civil rights movement.

== Reception ==
Upon its release, "Black Rage (Sketch)" was named the Best New Track by Pitchfork. The song was later placed on the publication's year-end list of the best songs. Rolling Stone characterized the track as "a powerful song about the strife of the African American community" and named it one of the "most powerful new protest anthems to come out of the Black Lives Matter era". Journalist Judy Berman of Flavorwire argued that the track was one of 2014's "most timely and necessary tracks".

Music critics have often been referred to the song as one of the essential tracks of the Black Lives Matter movement. In 2018, Esquire named it one of the "Best Modern Protest Songs for America". Ed Masley of The Arizona Republic ranked it as the 16th-best civil rights song. Time highlighted "Black Rage" as one of the fundamental tracks marking the revival of protest song during the Black Lives Matter movement. The publication compared the tune to "Mississippi Goddam" by Nina Simone, with writer Salamishah Tillet proclaiming that both songs showcase "the light-heartedness of its show tune arrangement in order to launch trenchant racial critique". NPR also noted similarities between the song and Simone's music.

Composer Vijay Iyer added the song to the "Black Music Soundscape Playlist" by Harvard University.

== See also ==
- Protest songs in the United States
- Songs about police brutality
- 2014 songs
- Songs written by Lauryn Hill
