= Lost Ones (Lauryn Hill song) =

American rap song

Song by Lauryn Hill

from the album The Miseducation of Lauryn Hill
- Released: August 25, 1998
- Recorded: 1998
- Studio: Marley Music Inc. (Kingston, Jamaica)
- Genre: Hip-hop
- Length: 5:33
- Label: Ruffhouse; Columbia
- Songwriter: Lauryn Hill
- Producers: Lauryn Hill; Vada Nobles; Che Pope

"Lost Ones" is a diss track by American rapper and singer-songwriter Lauryn Hill. It serves as the opening song on her 1998 debut album, The Miseducation of Lauryn Hill, released through Ruffhouse and Columbia Records. The track was written and produced by Hill, alongside Vada Nobles and Che Pope, and features an interpolation of the reggae classic "Bam Bam" by Sister Nancy. While Hill does not explicitly name individuals in the song, it is widely believed to address her former Fugees bandmate Wyclef Jean, with whom she had a strained personal and professional relationship.

Although not released as an official single, "Lost Ones" received significant radio play in the United States, peaking at number 27 on the Billboard R&B/Hip-Hop Airplay chart. The track earned a nomination for Best Rap Solo Performance at the 41st Grammy Awards. Hill performed the song at the 1999 MTV Video Music Awards, where she was introduced by David Bowie. Her performance was later nominated for the NAACP Image Award for Outstanding Performance in a Variety Series or Special.

Praised for its raw lyricism and sharp delivery, "Lost Ones" is frequently cited as one of the best diss tracks and one of the greatest hip-hop songs of all time. In 2013, Complex ranked it as the best rap song made by a woman, while Rolling Stone placed it 45th on their 2017 list of the "100 Greatest Hip Hop Songs of All Time", the second-highest position for a song by a female artist. Publications including The Guardian, HipHopDX, and MTV have also regarded it as the greatest hip hop diss track by a woman in hip-hop history. The track has been cited as an inspiration by rappers Nas and Rapsody.

== Background ==
"Lost Ones" was written and recorded at Chung King Studios in New York City, and completed in June 1998 at Tuff Gong Studios in Kingston, Jamaica, the song makes mention of this with the lyrics "I was hopeless, now I’m on Hope Road," and Hill figuratively and literally was: Tuff Gong's address is 56 Hope Road. The song is considered to be a nameless diss track aimed towards Hill's former Fugees bandmate Wyclef Jean. Following the split of The Fugees, Hill's former bandmate Jean blamed the split of the group on Hill's pregnancy, his tumultuous relationship with Hill and Jean marrying another woman while being in a relationship with Hill. Shortly after Hill began working on solo projects, ultimately turning down Wyclef Jean's offer to produce an album for Hill after urging her not to start a solo career. According to her former bandmate Pras this led to Hill's animosity towards Jean after she fully supported his solo career and featured on his album, Wyclef Jean Presents The Carnival.

== Aftermath ==
When asked if he believes the song is about him, Jean responded "personally I don’t take it as a shot". However Fugees member Pras claimed that Jean did think the song was about him when it was released, stating "obviously, he (Jean) thought it was about him. But I think he just kinda shrugged it off."

== Legacy ==
=== Samples ===
Wu-Tang Clan member Inspectah Deck sampled it for his song "Elevation" from his critically acclaimed solo album Uncontrolled Substance (1999). Rapper Fabolous samples the song on his single "Real One". Singer-songwriter H.E.R. flipped "Lost Ones" on her single "Lost Souls" by using a similar flow, drum pattern, and scratches. The song "We Know", written and composed by Lin-Manuel Miranda for the Broadway musical Hamilton references "Lost Ones". Jadakiss also samples the track for his single "Knock Yourself Out" featuring Pharrell Williams. Rapper Lil' Kim referenced The Miseducation of Lauryn Hill on her song "Mis-education of Lil' Kim" (from the 2008 mixtape Ms. G.O.A.T.), which samples "Lost Ones".

=== Impact and influence ===
In a 2014 interview with Vanity Fair, Nas mentioned "Lost Ones" among his favorite songs at the time. He also stated that Hill "created a sound that was timeless", and noted that the song has inspired him. American rapper Rapsody paid tribute to the song while speaking to Billboard, stating that Hill "knew how to incorporate melody into a rhyme so people could sing along with her, even as she was rapping about things that might have been complex", she then added "When I started making music, my cadences weren’t easy to learn, my lyrics were a puzzle. Through studying Lauryn and songs like "Lost Ones," I learned how to simplify".

The song was analyzed and discussed on the first addition of the Spotify music podcast Dissect's mini series segment. According to Pitchfork, writer Joan Morgan hails "Lost Ones" as a "rare opportunity for the cathartic release hip-hop is known for, but one usually associated with testosterone" in her book She Begat This.

=== Critical reception ===
"Lost Ones" has been placed on many critics' lists of the greatest diss songs, as well as the greatest hip hop songs of all time. Music journalist Danyel Smith referred to it as "the greatest diss record of all time". In conversation with Smith, rapper MC Lyte referred to the track as "the most beautifullest diss song". Rolling Stone ranked it 45th on their '100 Greatest Hip Hop Songs of All Time' list. NME placed it on their list of '19 Of The Fiercest Diss Tracks In Hip-Hop, Rock And Pop History'. Complex ranked it 26th on their list of the '50 Greatest Hip Hop Diss Songs; additionally, it topped their list of the '50 Best Rap Songs Made By Women'. MTV placed it on their list of 'Rap's Top 10 Diss Songs' list. "Lost Ones" was also ranked as one of the best diss tracks by publications such as The Herald, The Guardian, and HipHopDX, being the highest ranked hip hop diss track by a woman on their list.

Music critic Kathy Iandoli placed the song at number two on her ballot of BBC's 'Greatest Hip Hop songs of all time'. XXL placed it on their list of essential songs by women in hip hop. Christopher John Farley of Time, named it the best hip hop song (radio mix) by a woman, and the second best overall.

In 2017, The Boombox ranked the song's opening line "It's funny how money change a situation/Miscommunication lead to complication/My emancipation don't fit your equation" as the best verse by a female rapper, while also referring to it as "one of the dopest hip-hop verses of all-time". BET placed the same verse on their list of 'The 10 Best Verses of All Time'. O magazine placed the song on their list of 'The 50 Best Hip Hop songs of All Time'.

== Charts ==
Chart performance for "Lost Ones"
| Chart (1998) | Peak position |
|---|---|
| US R&B/Hip-Hop Airplay (Billboard) | 27 |

== See also ==
- List of notable diss tracks
