= Lauryn Hill discography =

Neo soul recording artist discography

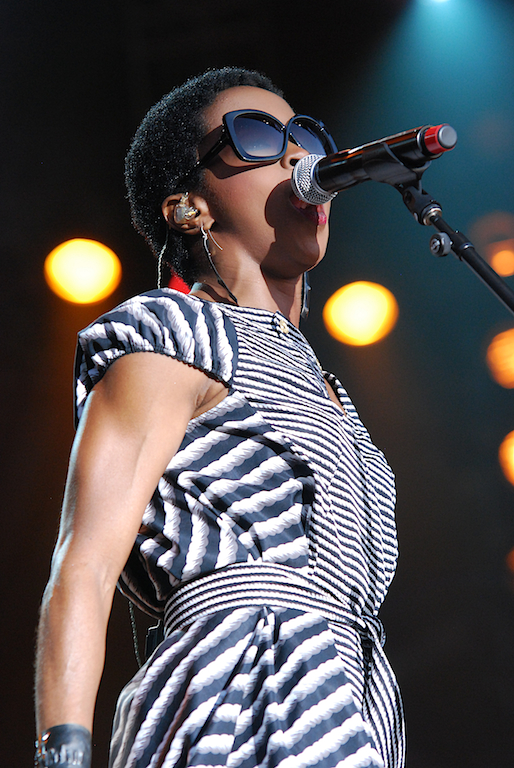
- Hill performing in 2012
- Studio albums: 1
- Live albums: 1
- Compilation albums: 1
- Singles: 11
- Video albums: 1
- Music videos: 13

American singer and rapper Lauryn Hill has released one studio album, one live album, and 20 singles (including nine singles as a featured artist). She has also written for and performed on several other tracks.

Released on August 25, 1998, Hill's debut album The Miseducation of Lauryn Hill sold over 423,000 copies in its first week (boosted by advance radio play of two non-label-sanctioned singles, "Lost Ones" and "Can't Take My Eyes Off You") and topped the US Billboard 200 for four weeks and the US Top R&B/Hip-Hop Albums for six weeks. It went on to sell 10 million copies in the US, being certified Diamond by the Recording Industry Association of America, and had sold 12 million copies worldwide by 2002. In 2018, Sony Music reported that the album had surpassed 20 million copies sold worldwide. The lead single released from the album was "Doo Wop (That Thing)", which debuted at number one on the Billboard Hot 100. Other charted singles from the album were "Ex-Factor", "Everything Is Everything", "Nothing Even Matters"and "To Zion".

During 2000, Hill dropped out of the public eye. In July 2001, while pregnant with her third child, Hill unveiled her new material to a small crowd, for a taping of an MTV Unplugged special. An album of the concert, titled MTV Unplugged No. 2.0, was released in May 2002 and featured only her singing and playing an acoustic guitar. 2.0 debuted at number three on the Billboard 200, and was certified platinum in the US the following month. The album included the tracks "I Gotta Find Peace of Mind" and "Mystery of Iniquity".

== Albums ==
=== Studio albums ===
List of albums, with selected chart positions
Title	Album details	Peak chart positions										Certifications
Title	Album details	US	US R&B/HH	AUS	CAN	FRA	NOR	NZ	SWE	SWI	UK	Certifications
The Miseducation of Lauryn Hill	Released: August 25, 1998; Labels: Columbia, Ruffhouse; Formats: CD, LP, Cassette, digital download, MD	1	1	2	1	3	2	5	3	11	2	RIAA: Diamond; ARIA: 2× Platinum; BPI: 4× Platinum; IFPI SWE: Platinum; IFPI SWI: Gold; MC: 7× Platinum; RIANZ: 3× Platinum; SNEP: 2× Platinum

=== Live albums ===
List of albums, with selected chart positions
Title	Album details	Peak chart positions										Certifications
Title	Album details	US	US R&B/HH	AUS	CAN	FRA	NOR	NZ	SWE	SWI	UK	Certifications
MTV Unplugged No. 2.0	Released: May 7, 2002; Label: Columbia; Formats: CD, LP, Cassette, digital download	3	2	16	9	4	5	35	10	3	40	RIAA: Platinum; MC: Platinum; IFPI SWI: Gold; SNEP: Gold

=== Compilation albums ===
Title	Album details
An Invitation to the Best of Lauryn Hill	Released: 2000; Label: Columbia; Format: LP

== Singles ==
=== As lead artist ===
List of singles as lead artist, with selected chart positions and certifications, showing year released and album name
Title	Year	Peak chart positions										Certifications	Album
Title	Year	US	US R&B/HH	US Rhy	AUS	FRA	NL	NZ	SWE	SWI	UK	Certifications	Album
"Doo Wop (That Thing)"	1998	1	2	1	35	23	4	—	39	10	3	RIAA: Gold; ARIA: 2× Platinum; BPI: 2× Platinum; RMNZ: 3× Platinum	The Miseducation of Lauryn Hill
"Ex-Factor"	1998	21	7	9	—	51	40	—	46	22	4	BPI: Platinum; RMNZ: 3× Platinum	The Miseducation of Lauryn Hill
"Everything Is Everything"	1999	35	14	18	76	—	51	15	—	—	20	RIAA: Gold; BPI: Silver; RMNZ: Gold	The Miseducation of Lauryn Hill
"Turn Your Lights Down Low" (with Bob Marley)	1999	— (Note: "Turn Your Lights Down Low" did not enter the Billboard Hot 100, but peaked at number four on the Bubbling Under Hot 100 Singles chart.)	49	15	69	14	5	1	5	15	15	BPI: Silver; IFPI SWE: Gold; SNEP: Gold; RMNZ: 3× Platinum	Chant Down Babylon
"Lose Myself"	2007	—	—	—	—	—	—	—	—	—	—		Surf's Up: Music from the Motion Picture
"Repercussions"	2010	—	83	—	—	—	—	—	—	—	—		Non-album singles
"Neurotic Society (Compulsory Mix)"	2013	—	—	—	—	—	—	—	—	—	—		Non-album singles
"Consumerism"	2013	—	—	—	—	—	—	—	—	—	—		Non-album singles
"Feeling Good"	2015	—	—	—	—	—	—	—	—	—	—		Nina Revisited: A Tribute to Nina Simone
"Guarding the Gates"	2019	—	—	—	—	—	—	—	—	—	—		Queen & Slim: The Soundtrack
"—" denotes a title that did not chart, or was not released in that territory.

=== As featured artist ===
List of singles as featured artist, with selected chart positions and certifications, showing year released and album name
Title	Year	Peak chart positions									Certifications	Album
Title	Year	US	US R&B/HH	US Rap	AUS	FRA	NLD	NZ	SWE	UK	Certifications	Album
"If I Ruled the World (Imagine That)" (Nas featuring Lauryn Hill)	1996	53	17	15	100	4	9	2	3	12	RIAA: Platinum	It Was Written
"Guantanamera" (Wyclef Jean featuring Lauryn Hill)	1997	—	23	—	—	—	32	15	48	25		The Carnival
"The Sweetest Thing" (Refugee Camp All-Stars featuring Lauryn Hill)	1997	—	2	—	—	—	—	—	—	18		Love Jones (soundtrack)
"Retrospect for Life" (Common featuring Lauryn Hill)	1997	—	—	—	—	—	—	—	—	—		One Day It'll All Make Sense
"All That I Can Say"{background vocals/writer} (Mary J. Blige)	1999	44	6	—	—	—	—	—	—	29		Mary
"So High" (Cloud 9 Remix) (John Legend featuring Lauryn Hill)	2005	—	53	—	—	—	—	—	—	—		Get Lifted
"Coming Home" (Pusha T featuring Lauryn Hill)	2019	—	—	—	—	—	—	—	—	—		Non-album single
"We Got Love" (Teyana Taylor featuring Lauryn Hill)	2020	—	—	—	—	—	—	—	—	—		The Album
"Save the Day" (with Mariah Carey)[Sampled]	2020	—	—	—	—	—	—	—	—	—		The Rarities
"—" denotes a title that did not chart, or was not released in that territory.

=== Promotional singles ===
Year	Title	Album
1998	"Lost Ones"	The Miseducation of Lauryn Hill

== Other charted and certified songs ==
List of singles as lead artist, with selected chart positions and certifications, showing year released and album name
Title	Year	Peak chart positions					Certifications	Album
Title	Year	US	US R&B/HH	AUS	SWE	UK	Certifications	Album
"Can't Take My Eyes Off You"	1998	—	45	8	—	—	ARIA: 2× Platinum; BPI: Silver; RMNZ: Platinum	The Miseducation of Lauryn Hill
"To Zion" (featuring Carlos Santana)	1998	—	77	—	—	—	RMNZ: Gold	The Miseducation of Lauryn Hill
"Tell Him"	1998	—	—	—	—	—	RMNZ: Platinum	The Miseducation of Lauryn Hill
"Nothing Even Matters" (featuring D'Angelo)	1999	— (Note: "Nothing Even Matters" did not enter the Billboard Hot 100, but peaked at number five on the Bubbling Under Hot 100 Singles chart.)	25	—	—	—	RMNZ: Gold	The Miseducation of Lauryn Hill
"The Miseducation of Lauryn Hill"	2000	—	—	—	14	—		The Miseducation of Lauryn Hill
"Nobody" (Nas featuring Lauryn Hill)	2021	— (Note: "Nobody" did not enter the Billboard Hot 100, but peaked at number two on the Bubbling Under Hot 100 chart.)	42	—	—	—		King's Disease II
"I Can't Wait" (Kanye West featuring Lauryn Hill)	2026	— (Note: "I Can't Wait" did not enter the Billboard Hot 100, but peaked at 46 on the component Radio Songs Chart.)	44	—	—	—		Bully - Deluxe
"—" denotes a title that did not chart, or was not released in that territory.

== Videography ==
=== Video albums ===
Year	Title	Director
2002	MTV Unplugged No. 2.0	Joey DeMaio

=== Music videos ===
==== As lead artist ====
Year	Title	Director
1997	"Sweetest Thing" with Refugee Camp Allstars	Paul Hunter
1998	"Doo Wop (That Thing)"	Big TV!
1998	"Ex-Factor"	Malik Sayeed
1999	"Everything Is Everything"	Sanji
1999	"Turn Your Lights Down Low" with Bob Marley	Francis Lawrence

==== As featured artist ====
Year	Artist	Title	Director
1996	Nas	"If I Ruled The World (Imagine That)"	Hype Williams
1997	Common	"Retrospect for Life"	Lauryn Hill
1998	Aretha Franklin	"A Rose Is Still a Rose"	Lauryn Hill
1999	Mary J. Blige	"All That I Can Say"	Noble Jones
2001	Artists Against AIDS Worldwide	"What's Going On"	Malik Sayeed & Jake Scott
2024	YG Marley	"Praise Jah in the Moonlight"	Cole Bennett

== Guest appearances ==
List of guest appearances, with other performing artists, showing year released and album name
Title	Year	Artist(s)	Album
"His Eye Is on the Sparrow"	1993	Tanya Blount	Sister Act 2: Back in the Habit (soundtrack)
"Flip da Script" [as L. Boogie]	1993	Mesanjarz of Funk, Lord Finesse	Mesanjarz of Funk
"Be with You (Remix)" (unreleased}	1995	Mary J. Blige	—N/a
"Stay Gold"	1996	Young Zee, Yah Yah	Musical Meltdown {released 2015}
"All My Time"	1997	Paid & Live	Non-album single
"Keep It Tight"	1997	DJ Skribble	Traffic Jams
"Year of the Dragon"	1997	Wyclef Jean	Wyclef Jean Presents The Carnival
"Sang Fézi"	1997	Wyclef Jean	Wyclef Jean Presents The Carnival
"On That Day" {producer}	1998	CeCe Winans	Everlasting Love
"I Was Made to Love Him" {producer/background vocals}	1998	Whitney Houston	My Love Is Your Love
"A Rose Is Still a Rose" {background vocals/writer}	1998	Aretha Franklin	A Rose is Still a Rose
"The Best of You (L-Boogie Mix)" {producer/background vocals}	1998	Andrea Martin	The Best of Me
"Do You Like the Way"	1999	Carlos Santana, Cee-Lo Green	Supernatural
"Little Drummer Boy"	1999	Rosie O'Donnell	A Rosie Christmas
"Summer (Oceanside Mix)"	2001	Kool & the Gang	Non-album single
"Selah"	2002	—N/a	Divine Secrets of the Ya-Ya Sisterhood (Soundtrack)
"The Passion"	2004	—N/a	The Passion of the Christ: Songs
"Music"	2007	Joss Stone	Introducing Joss Stone
"Close to You" {unreleased}	2010	Ronald Isley	Mr. I
"Black Is the Color of My True Love's Hair"	2015	—N/a	Nina Revisited: A Tribute to Nina Simone
"I've Got Life"	2015	—N/a	Nina Revisited: A Tribute to Nina Simone
"Wild is the Wind"	2015	—N/a	Nina Revisited: A Tribute to Nina Simone
"African Mailman"	2015	—N/a	Nina Revisited: A Tribute to Nina Simone
"A Perfect Match"	2019	Kali Ranks	—N/a
"Nobody"	2021	Nas	King's Disease II
"Black Woman"	2021	Fatoumata Diawara	The Harder They Fall (soundtrack)
"Praise Jah in the Moonlight"	2023	YG Marley	—N/a
"If You Can Count"	2024	Lin-Manuel Miranda	Warriors
"I Can't Wait"	2026	Kanye West	Bully (Deluxe)

== See also ==
- Fugees discography
