= Lose Myself =

2007 song by Lauryn Hill

Single by Ms. Lauryn Hill

from the album Surf's Up: Music from the Motion Picture
- Released: June 5, 2007
- Recorded: 2007
- Genre: Pop soul; Rock
- Length: 4:35
- Label: Sony
- Songwriter: Ms. Lauryn Hill
- Producer: Ms. Lauryn Hill

Ms. Lauryn Hill singles chronology
"Turn Your Lights Down Low" (1999)	"Lose Myself" (2007)	"Repercussions" (2010)

"Lose Myself" is a 2007 song by American singer and rapper Lauryn Hill, released under the name Ms. Lauryn Hill as part of the soundtrack for the animated film Surf's Up. The song plays during the film's end credits. It marked Hill's first officially released solo material since 2004 and blends synth-pop, rock, and soul influences with introspective lyrics about spiritual struggle and self-discovery. English singer Marsha Ambrosius covered the song for her 2011 debut Late Nights and Early Mornings.

== Background and release ==
"Lose Myself" is a song by Lauryn Hill, released in 2007 as part of the soundtrack for the animated film Surf's Up. It was her first officially released solo material since her 2004 appearance on The Passion of the Christ: Songs soundtrack with the song "The Passion". According to The Guardian, Hill wrote the lyrics while in the shower, during a period of personal challenges and professional withdrawal from the music industry.

== Composition and style ==
The track blends synth-pop with rock and soul influences, showcasing a more experimental sound compared to her 1990s releases. Critics noted its rhythmic similarities to Outkast's "Hey Ya!", particularly in its upbeat, off-kilter groove. Despite its upbeat production, the lyrics showcase themes of anguish, spiritual struggle, and self-love. The New York Times noted Hill's turn toward a more rock-oriented sound on "Lose Myself", framing it as part of her evolving musical approach post-Miseducation. The song's lyrics also parallels to the character Big Z's passion for surfing in Surf's Up.

In the 2023 academic book Stay Black and Die: On Melancholy and Genius, scholar I. Augustus Durham analyzed the lyric "I had to lose myself / So I could love you better" as an expression of Black identity, sacrifice, and self-love, comparing it to the work of W. E. B. Du Bois and Langston Hughes.

== Reception ==
The Guardian called "Lose Myself" the "gem" of her 2000s output. The song was included on a purpose-driven playlist curated by Jazmine Sullivan for the September issue of Harper's Bazaar, and cited by actor and writer Dan Levy as one of the most heartfelt songs Hill has ever released. It was later covered by English singer Marsha Ambrosius on her 2011 debut album Late Nights & Early Mornings.
