= Ready Now =

Studio album by Truth Hurts
- Released: June 1, 2004
- Length: 41:46
- Label: Pookie
- Producer: Alonzo Jackson; Battlecat; Truth Hurts; Raphael Saadiq; Brian Wilson; Kelvin Wooten

Truth Hurts chronology
Truthfully Speaking (2002)	Ready Now (2004)

Ready Now is the second studio album by American singer Truth Hurts. It was released by Pookie Entertainment on June 1, 2004 in the United States. Hurts worked with Raphael Saadiq on the majority of the album.

== Background ==
Conceived after Hurts' departure from Aftermath Entertainment, she elaborated on the production of the album in 2011: "Ready Now was a new era in my career as an independent artist. I had the pleasure of working with Raphael Saadiq and put a lot of energy into this album. I truly learned a lot from past experiences in the industry dealing with my last album. Therefore, it was a new start, with a new identity, and new attitude."

== Critical reception ==
Professional ratings
Review scores
Source	Rating
AllMusic	3.5/5 stars
Slant Magazine	3.5/5 stars
Vibe	3.5/5 stars

AllMusic editor Todd Kristel called Ready Now a "sultry sophomore album [that] is more concise than her hour-long debut. None of the songs seem like unnecessary filler, and even the seven-minute "U" doesn't overstay its welcome. She still relies on backup singers to complement the vocals, but her voice has gotten stronger; she displays greater emotional nuance (e.g., "Ready Now") and vocal nimbleness (e.g., "Can't Be Mad"), and the production of her voice has gotten less overblown [...] It's still a satisfying set of sexy, silky smooth music."

Slant Magazine critic Sal Cinquemani described the album as "a decided departure from 2002's Truthfully Speaking and added: "Truth, Saadiq, and company have opted for neo-soul over high-tech hip-hop while retaining a forward-thinking sound." He felt that "Hurts oozes personality, and the racy, sexy, and mature Ready Now almost completely fills the promise of her debut." Stefan Braidwood from PopMatters found that "although the album is not lacking in cohesion, its many points of reference form a whole that is both evocative of the (superior) originals, and less than the sum of its parts."

== Chart performance ==
Ready Now debuted and peaked at number 173 on the US Billboard 200.

== Track listing ==
Ready Now track listing
No.	Title	Writer(s)	Producer(s)	Length
1.	"Knock Knock" (featuring Raphael Saadiq)	Kelvin Wooten; Saadiq	Saadiq; Wooten^{[A]}	3:53
2.	"Ready Now"	Shari Watson; Wooten; Saadiq; Taura Jackson	Wooten; Saadiq^{[A]}	3:55
3.	"Ride"	Watson; Alonzo Jackson; T. Jackson; Joseph Herns	A. Jackson; Herns^{[A]}	3:04
4.	"Love U Better"	Watson; Kevin Gilliam	Battlecat	4:45
5.	"Catch 22"	Watson; A. Jackson; T. Jackson	A. Jackson	4:38
6.	"Phone Sex"	Watson; Saadiq; A. Jackson; T. Jackson	A. Jackson	3:17
7.	"Whatchu Sayin'" (featuring Loon)	Watson; Andre Wilson; Brian Wilson; Casey Wilson; Chauncey Hawkins; Orville Allen	B. Wilson; Allen^{[A]}	3:50
8.	"Lifetime (Interlude)"	Watson	Truth Hurts	0:53
9.	"Lifetime"	Brian Randolph; Lionel Holoman; Saadiq	Saadiq	3:22
10.	"Can't Be Mad"	Watson; A. Jackson; T. Jackson	A. Jackson	3:54
11.	"U"	Watson; B. Wilson	B. Wilson; Saadiq^{[A]}; Hurts^{[A]}	7:22

Japan bonus track
No.	Title	Length
12.	"Ready Now" (Pt. 2)

Notes

- ^{^[A]} denotes co-producer

Sample credits

- "Ride" contains excerpts from "Hail Mary” as performed by Tupac Shakur.

== Charts ==
Weekly chart performance for Ready Now
Chart (2004)	Peak position
US Billboard 200	173
US Top R&B/Hip-Hop Albums (Billboard)	46
