= Casablanco =

2024 studio album by Marsha Ambrosius

Studio album by Marsha Ambrosius
- Released: 28 June 2024
- Genres: R&B; hip-hop
- Length: 48:20
- Labels: Aftermath; Interscope
- Producers: Dr. Dre; Marsha Ambrosius; Focus...; Dem Jointz; Erik "Blu2th" Griggs; DJ Khalil; Phonix.; Trevor Lawrence Jr.

Marsha Ambrosius chronology
Nyla (2018)	Casablanco (2024)

Singles from Casablanco
- 1. "The Greatest" Released: 30 November 2023; 2. "One Night Stand" Released: 22 March 2024; 3. "Greedy" Released: 14 June 2024

Casablanco is the fourth studio album by British R&B singer Marsha Ambrosius. Released on 28 June 2024 through Aftermath Entertainment and Interscope Records, the production was mainly handled by Dr. Dre. It contains singles including "The Greatest", "One Night Stand", and "Greedy".

== Background ==
Ambrosius announced her new album, Casablanco during a press event. The album was eventually released on 28 June 2024, through Aftermath Entertainment. The collaboration with Dr. Dre began in 2020, following his recovery from a brain aneurysm. The album was primarily recorded in Los Angeles, with Ambrosius and Dre enlisting producers including Dem Jointz, Erik "Blu2th" Griggs, Focus..., DJ Khalil, and Phonix. The production began in 2021.

== Track listing ==
Casablanco track listing
No.	Title	Writer(s)	Producer(s)	Length
1.	"Smoke"	Marsha Ambrosius; Andre Young; Bernard Edwards Jr.; Dwayne Abernathy Jr.; Erik Griggs; Jerome Kern; K. Williams; Otto Harbach; Peter Brown; Robert Rans	Dr. Dre; Ambrosius; Dem Jointz; Erik "Blu2th" Griggs; Focus...	3:39
2.	"Tunisian Nights"	M. Ambrosius; Young	Dr. Dre; Ambrosius; Dem Jointz; Griggs	4:09
3.	"One Night Stand"	M. Ambrosius; Young	Dr. Dre; Ambrosius; Griggs	4:16
4.	"Cloudy with a Chance of ...Real"	M. Ambrosius; Young	Dr. Dre; Ambrosius; Dem Jointz; Focus...; Griggs	4:51
5.	"Greedy"	M. Ambrosius; Young	Dr. Dre; Ambrosius; Focus...; Griggs	5:01
6.	"Self Care / Wrong Right"	M. Ambrosius; Young	Dr. Dre; Ambrosius; DJ Khalil; Phonix	5:00
7.	"Wet"	M. Ambrosius; Young	Dr. Dre; Ambrosius; Focus...; Griggs	4:24
8.	"Thrill Her"	M. Ambrosius; Young	Dr. Dre; Ambrosius; Griggs	3:59
9.	"The Greatest"	M. Ambrosius; Young	Dr. Dre; Ambrosius; Dem Jointz; Focus...; Griggs; Trevor Lawrence Jr.	3:16
10.	"Best I Could Find"	M. Ambrosius; Young	Dr. Dre; Ambrosius	4:30
11.	"Music of My Mind"	M. Ambrosius; Young	Dr. Dre; Ambrosius; Dem Jointz; Focus...; Griggs	5:15
Total length:				48:20
