= Late Nights & Early Mornings =

Studio album by Marsha Ambrosius
- Released: 1 March 2011
- Length: 51:25
- Label: J
- Producers: Marsha Ambrosius (exec.); Dre & Vidal; Canei Finch; Focus...; Rich Harrison; Just Blaze; Syience

Marsha Ambrosius chronology
Late Nights & Early Mornings (2011)	Friends & Lovers (2014)

Singles from Late Nights & Early Mornings
- 1. "Hope She Cheats On You (With A Basketball Player)" Released: 13 August 2010; 2. "Far Away" Released: 7 December 2010; 3. "Late Nights & Early Mornings" Released: 11 May 2011

Late Nights & Early Mornings is the debut solo studio album by English singer-songwriter Marsha Ambrosius. It was released on March 1, 2011, by J Records, following the disbandment of her R&B duo Floetry. The album debuted at number two on the US Billboard 200 chart reached number one on the Top R&B/Hip-Hop Albums chart, selling 96,400 copies in its first week. It includes covers of Lauryn Hill's "Lose Myself" and Portishead's "Sour Times". The project spawned three singles, "Hope She Cheats on You (With a Basketball Player)", "Far Away" and "Late Nights & Early Mornings"; "Far Away" earned two Grammy Award nominations, including Best R&B Song. It was Ambrosius' only release on J Records before the label folded later that year.

== Background ==
Songs from Late Nights & Early Mornings were produced and written by Ambrosius herself with other contributors, including Just Blaze, Dre & Vidal, Focus... and co-writing credits by Alicia Keys and Lauryn Hill The album also contains a cover version of Portishead's "Sour Times". Ambrosius said that the overall vibe of the album is "sensual, it’s sincere, it’s seductive" and also explained, “Not too many women get the opportunity to say what they want, and having controlled and written pretty much everything I get to do all of that on one album. J Records, they understood me as an artist and said, ‘What do you want? How do you want to sound? What do you feel like your album should be’ and they allowed me to go in the studio.” Ambrosius describes the song, "Hope She Cheats on You (With a Basketball Player)" as "the reality of a bad break up."

== Promotion ==
"Hope She Cheats On You (With A Basketball Player)" was released as the album's first single on 13 August 2010. The song peaked on the US Hot R&B/Hip-Hop Songs chart at number twenty-two. "Far Away" was released as the album's second single on 7 December 2010. It is produced by Just Blaze and written by Marsha Ambrosius with co-writing by Sterling Simms. The track was inspired by one of Ambrosius's own friends who committed suicide, and discusses how it feels once someone she's loved is gone. This song has reached number three on the R&B/Hip-Hop Songs chart. The title track, "Late Nights & Early Mornings", was released as the third single.

== Critical reception ==
Professional ratings
Review scores
Source	Rating
About.com	4/5 stars
AllMusic	4.5/5 stars
DJBooth	4.5/5 stars
Slant	2/5 stars
The Village Voice	(favorable)

Late Nights & Early Mornings received generally positive reviews from music critics. Allmusic editor Andy Kellman found that "in a way, Late Nights & Early Mornings picks up where 2005's Flo'Ology, left off [...] Those who could not get into the Floetry albums due to Ambrosius' occasionally tremulous delivery should have no problem this time. The characteristic is no distraction – put to use with less frequency and typically in service to the song, not purely for show." Melody Charles from SoulTracks remarked that the album "captures what is so intriguing about the triple-threat performer: her straight-forward sensuality, her emotional authenticity and the way she grafts those qualities together into melodic masterpieces [...] Self-possessed, skillfully-rendered and undeniably soulful, Ms. Ambrosius' debut is already one of 2011's Must-Haves: if you value depth and dimension in your listening experience, count on having many Late Nights & Early Mornings with this CD/download enveloping your ears."

DJBooth.net's Nathan Slavik referred to the album as a "near-classic," stating "Marsha Ambrosius’ debut is the R&B album of the year." Slant critic Jesse Cataldo wrote that "despite the appearance of established hip-hop producers and the vocal talents of an intelligent, assured female performer, Late Nights & Early Mornings is drab all over. None of its elements, from expressions of female sexuality to revenge wishes against unfaithful ex-lovers, are sufficiently piercing to cut through the blandness." She felt that the album "blurs together through typical narratives of love and loss, joy and sorrow, merely approximating these emotions through the standard language established for such things. Nothing especially stands out, and though Ambrosius makes no overt mistakes on her first album, nothing she offers ever approaches making it memorable."

== Commercial performance ==
In the United States the album debuted at number two on the Billboard 200, behind fellow Brit Adele's "21", with fellow Brits Mumford and Sons "Sigh No More" at number 3 (the first instance British artists had held the top 3 positions on the chart in over 25 years). It also peaked at number one on the Top R&B/Hip-Hop Albums, with 96,400 copies sold in the first week. By June 2011, Late Nights & Early Mornings had sold 306,700 units in the United States.

== Track listing ==
No.	Title	Writer(s)	Producer(s)	Length
1.	"Anticipation" (Intro)	Marsha Ambrosius	Ambrosius	1:29
2.	"With You"	Ambrosius; Alicia Keys	Ambrosius	5:09
3.	"Late Nights & Early Mornings"	Ambrosius; Rich Harrison	Harrison	3:34
4.	"Hope She Cheats On You (With A Basketball Player)"	Ambrosius; Canei Finch	Ambrosius; Finch	4:06
5.	"Far Away"	Ambrosius; Finch; Sterling Simms	Just Blaze	7:17
6.	"Lose Myself"	Lauryn Hill	Finch	5:03
7.	"Your Hands"	Ambrosius; Andre Harris; Vidal Davis	Dre & Vidal	3:30
8.	"I Want You to Stay"	Ambrosius	Ambrosius	3:50
9.	"Sour Times"	Geoff Barrow; Beth Gibbons; Adrian Utley	Ambrosius	3:20
10.	"Tears"	Ambrosius; Norman Whitfield	Focus...	2:57
11.	"Chasing Clouds"	Ambrosius; Reggie Perry	Syience	3:45
12.	"The Break Up Song"	Ambrosius	Ambrosius	3:29
13.	"Butterflies (Remix)"	Ambrosius; Harris	Ambrosius; Finch	4:12

iTunes bonus track
No.	Title	Writer(s)	Producer(s)	Length
14.	"Fan"	Ambrosius	Ambrosius	2:58

Sample credits

- "Far Away" contains a portion of the composition "You Keep Me Hangin' On" as performed by The Supremes.
- "Lose Myself is a cover of the composition "Lose Myself" by Lauryn Hill.
- "Sour Times" is a cover of the composition "Sour Times" by Portishead.
- "Tears" contains a portion of the composition "Crying" as written by Norman Whitfield.

== Credits and personnel ==
Credits for Late Nights & Early Mornings from AllMusic.

- Marsha Ambrosius – Composer, Primary Artist, Producer
- Glynis Selina Arban – Photography
- Geoff Barrow – Composer
- Adam Blackstone – Bass, Bass (Upright)
- Mikaelin 'Blue' Bluespruce – Engineer, Mixing
- Henry Brooks – Composer
- Nell Brown – Engineer
- Canei Finch – Composer, Mixing, Producer
- Vidal Davis – Composer, Drum Programming, Mixing, Producer
- DJ Aktive – Scratching, Turntables
- Lamont Dozier – Composer
- Peter Edge – Producer
- Robyn Fernandes – Stylist
- Focus... – Engineer, Instrumentation, Producer
- Jesus Garnica – Assistant
- Beth Gibbons – Composer
- Erwin Gorostiza – Creative Director
- Andre Harris – Composer, Engineer, Producer
- Rich Harrison – Composer, Producer
- Brandon D. Henderson – Engineer
- Lauryn Hill – Composer
- Brian Holland – Composer
- Eddie Holland – Composer
- Rayfield Holloman – Guitar, Musician
- Michelle Holme – Art Direction
- Jaycen Joshua – Mixing
- Trevor Jerideau – Producer
- JJ – Make-Up
- Just Blaze – Producer
- Alicia Keys – Composer
- Ryan Moys – Engineer
- Reggie Perry – Composer
- Oscar Ramirez – Engineer
- Montez Roberts – Engineer
- Darrell Robinson – Brushes, Musician
- Lalo Schifrin – Composer
- Tippi Shorter – Hai Soon
- Sterling Simms – Composer
- Justin Smith – Composer
- Syience – Musician, Producer
- Otis Turner – Composer
- Adrian Utley – Composer
- Ryan West – Mixing
- Norman Whitfield – Composer
- Andrew Wright – Engineer

== Charts ==
=== Weekly charts ===
Chart (2011)	Peak position
US Billboard 200	2
US Top R&B/Hip-Hop Albums (Billboard)	1

=== Year-end charts ===
Chart (2011)	Position
US Billboard 200	77
US Top R&B/Hip-Hop Albums (Billboard)	19
