= Addictive (song) =

2002 single by Truth Hurts

Single by Truth Hurts featuring Rakim

from the album Truthfully Speaking
- Released: April 1, 2002
- Studio: Encore (Burbank, California); Larrabee (Los Angeles)
- Length: 3:46
- Label: Aftermath; Interscope
- Songwriters: Stephen Garrett; William Griffin; David Blake; Billy Nichols
- Producer: DJ Quik

Truth Hurts singles chronology
"Addictive" (2002)	"The Truth" (2002)

Rakim singles chronology
"When I B on the Mic" (1999)	"Addictive" (2002)	"Holy Are U" (2009)

"Addictive" is a song by American R&B singer Truth Hurts. It was released as the lead single from her debut album, Truthfully Speaking (2002), on April 1, 2002. Written by Static Major, Rakim, DJ Quik, and Billy Nichols, "Addictive" features a verse from Rakim and is based on a Hindi music sample, which eventually brought on a $500 million lawsuit against Aftermath Entertainment. "Addictive" was Truth Hurts' only song to chart on the US Billboard Hot 100, peaking at number nine. It was also a top-five hit in several European countries, achieving gold status in Belgium, France, and Switzerland.

== Background ==
Steve "Static Major" Garrett wrote the song's lyrics, and the record was produced by DJ Quik. Quik sampled for its instrumental track a Hindi-song he heard on television early one morning. The sample turned out to be "Thoda Resham Lagta Hai", a 1981 song by Indian singer Lata Mangeshkar for the 1981 movie Jyoti, which Aftermath neglected to clear the rights to. Copyright holders Saregama India, Ltd. issued a cease-and-desist order, which went unheeded. On September 12, 2002, Saregama filed a $500 million lawsuit against Aftermath and parent company Universal Music Group, and filed an injunction to prevent further performances or broadcasts of the "Addictive" song. At the end of 2002, Slant ranked the single the ninth-best of the year and jokingly awarded it the title of "Best Use of an Illegal Sample".

The song additionally samples "Do It ('Til You're Satisfied)" by B.T. Express, and the first line of Rakim's rap, "Thinking of a master plan," also serves the opening lyric from his 1987 song "Paid in Full". Although DJ Quik was credited as the solo producer, he confirmed the song was produced by Dr. Dre. In the album's liner notes, Dr. Dre is credited only as a mixer.

== Track listings ==
UK CD single

1. "Addictive" (album version) – 3:46
2. "Addictive" (remix) – 4:55
3. "Addictive" (instrumental) – 3:46
4. "Addictive" (video CD-ROM)

UK 12-inch single

A1. "Addictive" (album version) – 3:46
A2. "Addictive" (instrumental) – 3:46
B1. "Addictive" (remix) – 4:55

UK cassette single

1. "Addictive" (album version) – 3:46
2. "Addictive" (remix) – 4:55

European CD single

1. "Addictive" (album version)
2. "Addictive" (remix radio edit)

== Credits and personnel ==
Credits are taken from the Truthfully Speaking album booklet.

Studios

- Recorded at Encore Studios (Burbank, California) and Larrabee (Los Angeles)
- Mixed at Encore Studios (Burbank, California)
- Mastered at Bernie Grundman Mastering (Hollywood, California)

Personnel

- Static Major – writing (as Stephen Garret)
- Rakim – writing (as Willian Griffin), featured vocals, production
- DJ Quik – writing (as David Blake), percussion
- Billy Nichols – writing ("Do It ('Til You're Satisfied)")
- Truth Hurts – vocals (as Shari Watson)
- Erick Coomes – bass
- Bryan Brock – percussion
- Mauricio "Veto" Iragorri – recording
- Chris Puram – recording
- Farah Fima – recording assistant
- Thomas Rounds – recording assistant
- James "Flea" McCrone – recording assistant
- Francis Forde – recording assistant
- Dr. Dre – mixing, production (uncredited)
- Kevin "Kirv" Irving – vocal arrangement
- Brian "Big Bass" Gardner – mastering

== Charts ==
=== Weekly charts ===
Chart (2002–2003)	Peak position
Austria (Ö3 Austria Top 40)	20
Belgium (Ultratop 50 Flanders)	7
Belgium (Ultratop 50 Wallonia)	6
Denmark (Tracklisten)	7
Europe (Eurochart Hot 100)	11
France (SNEP)	5
Germany (GfK)	9
Greece (IFPI)	3
Ireland (IRMA)	30
Italy (FIMI)	16
Netherlands (Dutch Top 40)	6
Netherlands (Single Top 100)	3
New Zealand (Recorded Music NZ)	30
Portugal (AFP)	7
Romania (Romanian Top 100)	64
Scottish Singles Sales (Official Charts)	12
Sweden (Sverigetopplistan)	50
Switzerland (Schweizer Hitparade)	3
UK Singles (Official Charts)	3
UK Hip Hop/R&B (Official Charts)	1
US Billboard Hot 100	9
US Hot R&B/Hip-Hop Songs (Billboard)	2
US Pop Airplay (Billboard)	34
US Rhythmic Airplay (Billboard)	6

=== Year-end charts ===
Chart (2002)	Position
Belgium (Ultratop 50 Flanders)	36
Belgium (Ultratop 50 Wallonia)	25
Europe (Eurochart Hot 100)	47
France (SNEP)	42
Germany (Media Control)	64
Netherlands (Dutch Top 40)	43
Netherlands (Single Top 100)	29
Switzerland (Schweizer Hirparade)	17
UK Singles (OCC)	71
UK Urban (Music Week)	3
US Billboard Hot 100	40
US Hot R&B/Hip-Hop Singles & Tracks (Billboard)	13

Chart (2003)	Position
France (SNEP)	76

== Certifications and sales ==
Region	Certification	Certified units/sales
Belgium (BRMA)	Gold	25,000^{*}
France (SNEP)	Gold	250,000^{*}
Switzerland (IFPI Switzerland)	Gold	20,000^{^}
United Kingdom (BPI)	Silver	200,000^{‡}
^{*} Sales figures based on certification alone.^{^} Shipments figures based on certification alone.^{‡} Sales+streaming figures based on certification alone.

== Release history ==
Region	Date	Format(s)	Label(s)	Ref(s).
United States	April 1, 2002	Urban radio	Aftermath; Interscope	
United States	April 9, 2002	12-inch vinyl	Aftermath; Interscope	
United Kingdom	August 19, 2002	12-inch vinyl; CD; cassette	Aftermath; Interscope	
Australia	August 26, 2002	CD	Aftermath; Interscope	
