= Truthfully Speaking =

Studio album by Truth Hurts
- Released: June 25, 2002
- Recorded: 2000–2002
- Genres: R&B; hip hop
- Length: 60:48
- Labels: Aftermath; Interscope
- Producers: Dr. Dre (exec.); DJ Quik; Focus...; Darren "Limitless" Henson; Hi-Tek; Errol "Poppi" McCalla; Mel-Man; Ray Murray; Keith "Keshon" Pelzer; R. Kelly; Timbaland

Truth Hurts chronology
Truthfully Speaking (2002)	Ready Now (2004)

Singles from Truthfully Speaking
- 1. "Addictive" Released: April 23, 2002

Truthfully Speaking is the debut studio album by American singer Truth Hurts. It was released on June 25, 2002, through Aftermath Entertainment and Interscope Records. Dr. Dre served as the album's executive producer.

== Critical reception ==
Professional ratings
Review scores
Source	Rating
AllMusic	2.5/5 stars
HipHopDX	4/5 stars
Slant Magazine	3/5 stars

Truthfully Speaking earned generally mixed reviews from music critics. BBC Music critic Emmy Perry called the album a "quality debut performance with solid production and Truth's considerable talents as a songwriter making up for the fact that few tracks match up to the originality of the first single. There is however no questioning the calibre and tone of her operatic voice, which appears to convey the harsh sound of the streets whilst keeping the church firmly in mind." Sal Cinquemani, writing for Slant Magazine, called Truthfully Speaking a "slow burner that draws on more traditional hip-hop and R&B sound structures and displays Truth’s versatile, often coquettish, vocal (think a less socially-conscious Jill Scott)."

PopMatters described Truthfully Speaking as a "a simple album filled with plenty of vocal potential but misses the mark with its overall simplicity." AllMusic editor John Bush found that despite a "star-studded credit list, Truthfully Speaking is a bland record; Truth Hurts' vocals, while evocative and rangy, aren't incredibly strong (especially when she's stretching a note), and she usually needs a backup chorus to keep the songs sounding good [...] A few of the productions make for good tracks, though most of the time Truth Hurts struggles to keep up with the best in the contemporary R&B field."

== Commercial performance ==
The album debuted at five on the US Billboard 200, selling 89,000 copies. By October 2003, Truthfully Speaking had sold 338,000 copies in the United States, according to Nielsen SoundScan.

== Track listing ==
Truthfully Speaking track listing
No.	Title	Writer(s)	Producer(s)	Length
1.	"Push Play" (featuring Dr. Dre)	Truth Hurts; Andre Young; KRS-One	Dr. Dre	2:42
2.	"Addictive" (featuring Rakim)	David Blake; Stephen Garrett; William Griffin; Billy Nichols	DJ Quik	3:46
3.	"Next to Me"	Watson; Bernard Edwards, Jr.	Focus...	3:35
4.	"Jimmy"	Watson; Young; Mike Elizondo	Dr. Dre	3:49
5.	"Grown"	Watson; Darren "Limitless" Henson; Keith "Keshon" Pelzer	Henson; Pelzer	3:36
6.	"This Feeling"	Watson; Errol "Poppi" McCalla	McCalla	5:55
7.	"Tired"	Watson; Melvin Bradford; Elizondo	Mel-Man	4:32
8.	"I'm Not Really Lookin'" (featuring DJ Quik)	Watson; Blake	DJ Quik	3:57
9.	"B S (Bullshit)" (featuring Big Rube)	Watson; Brandon Bennett; Mike Hardnett; Marvin Parkman; Ray Murray; Ruben Bailey; Taura Jackson	Murray	4:47
10.	"Queen of the Ghetto" (featuring Kittie)	Watson; Young	Dr. Dre	2:46
11.	"The Truth"	Robert Kelly	R. Kelly	3:53
12.	"Real"	Scott Storch; Stephen Garrett; Tim Mosley	Timbaland	4:32
13.	"Hollywood" (featuring Dr. Dre)	Watson; Tony Cotrell; Varick Smith	Hi-Tek	3:21
14.	"Do Me"	Watson; Edwards	Focus...	3:44

Japan and UK bonus track
No.	Title	Length
15.	"Benefit of the Doubt"

Notes

- ^{^[A]} denotes co-producer
- In addition to writing and producing the song, R. Kelly performs the third verse on the song "The Truth" but is uncredited.

Sample credits

- "Push Play" contains a portion of "I'm Still #1" as performed by KRS-One.
- "Addictive" contains a sample from "Do It (Til You're Satisfied)" as written by Billy Nichols.

== Charts ==
=== Weekly charts ===
Weekly chart performance for Truthfully Speaking
Chart (2002)	Peak position
French Albums (SNEP)	42
German Albums (Offizielle Top 100)	44
Dutch Albums (Album Top 100)	57
Swiss Albums (Schweizer Hitparade)	57
UK Albums (Official Charts)	61
US Billboard 200	5
US Top R&B/Hip-Hop Albums (Billboard)	4

=== Year-end charts ===
Year-end chart performance for Truthfully Speaking
Chart (2002)	Position
Canadian R&B Albums (Nielsen SoundScan)	118
US Top R&B/Hip-Hop Albums (Billboard)	86
