= Hope She Cheats on You (With a Basketball Player) =

Single by Marsha Ambrosius

from the album Late Nights & Early Mornings
- Released: 13 August 2010
- Genre: R&B; hip hop soul
- Length: 4:06
- Label: J
- Songwriters: Marsha Ambrosius, Canei Finch
- Producers: Marsha Ambrosius, Canei Finch

Marsha Ambrosius singles chronology
"Hope She Cheats on You (With a Basketball Player)" (2010)	"Far Away" (2010)

"Hope She Cheats on You (With a Basketball Player)" is a song by English recording artist Marsha Ambrosius. It was released on August 13, 2010 as the lead single from her debut studio album, Late Nights & Early Mornings.

== Background ==
The song was written and produced by Marsha Ambrosius and Canei Finch. Ambrosius describes the song as "the reality of a bad breakup" and also said, "We wanna be decent human beings and say the right thing, you know, 'I wish you well.' But this is 'Everything that could go wrong for him, I want it to because my ego is bruised and I’m acting out." Ambrosius wrote the song on behalf of a friend who experienced a bad break-up. "I couldn't let it go," she states.

== Remix ==
The official remix features rappers Fabolous and Maino. It was released on 23 September 2010.

== Charts ==
Chart (2010)	Peak position
US Billboard Hot 100	88
US Hot R&B/Hip-Hop Songs (Billboard)	22

== Covers ==
Amanda Marshall released a cover of "Hope She Cheats on You (With a Basketball Player)", retitled "I Hope She Cheats", as the lead single from her Heavy Lifting album on March 31, 2023.
