= Friends & Lovers (Marsha Ambrosius album) =

Studio album by Marsha Ambrosius
- Released: 15 July 2014
- Length: 60:20
- Label: RCA
- Producer: Marsha Ambrosius (exec.); Andrew "Hit Drew" Clifton; Ronald "Flippa" Colson; Da Internz; Dr. Dre; Eric Hudson; J.U.S.T.I.C.E. League; Dem Jointz; Seige Monstracity; Pop & Oak; Jameel Roberts; Jamie Scott

Marsha Ambrosius chronology
Late Nights & Early Mornings (2011)	Friends & Lovers (2014)	Nyla (2018)

Singles from Friends & Lovers
- 1. "Run" Released: 23 June 2014; 2. "Stronger" Released: 23 June 2014

Friends & Lovers is the second studio album by English R&B singer Marsha Ambrosius. It was released by RCA Records on 15 July 2014. The album features guest appearances from Charlie Wilson, Dr. Dre, Skye Edwards and Lindsey Stirling. On 23 June 2014 the album's first and second singles "Run" and "Stronger" featuring Dr. Dre, were released.

== Background ==
In March 2014, in an interview with Singersroom, Marsha Ambrosius spoke about the album, saying: "Just the new album, Friends & Lovers, that’s my baby, well baby number 2. I feel like I’m definitely pregnant with the little one, which is the second album. And it’s absolutely; it just feel crazy this time around because it’s real. The first time around was like, let me get the album out, let’s make sure the album is right, let me do what I need to do and I did that to myself. I put all of the things I need to do on the album with the last album. But, the second album is more concentrated, it’s very conceptual. I enjoy being absolutely single with some friends and lovers."

== Critical reception ==
Professional ratings
Review scores
Source	Rating
AllMusic	4/5 stars
SoulTracks	(favorable)
Spin	7/10
USA Today	3/4 stars

Friends & Lovers was met with generally positive reviews from music critics and received two MOBO Award nominations for the album. Andy Kellman of AllMusic wrote that "Ambrosius took her time with Friends & Lovers. In a good way, it shows, as it contains another sizable volume of impeccable – sometimes explicit – slow jams. Front-loaded with a handful of euphoric ballads, including collaborations with Da Internz and the J.U.S.T.I.C.E. League, the album is mostly about vulnerable but assertive sensuality." SoulTracks's Melody Charles found that "Ambrosius channels her personal growth and musical prolificacy into songs that chart where we are, where we've been and where we might end up in our relationships. Friends & Lovers mirrors real life: Some you've got to have within reach, others you can do without [...] the rest just make the journey anything but routine."

Martín Caballero of USA Today said, "The ex-Floetry singer has never matched the sales success of peers such as Alicia Keys or Mary J. Blige, but her appeal matches them on this strong effort as she moves nimbly between refined maturity and raw sexual power." Anupa Mistry of Spin stated, "Like the cover of Portishead's "Sour Times" on Late Nights, a do-over anchors Friends & Lovers: Sade's "Stronger Than Pride," featuring a brawny verse from Dr. Dre, and set to the stark drip of DJ Premier's beat for Jeru the Damaja's "Come Clean." She might have taken the rap bonafides a bit too far with "Stronger" – especially considering she's respected enough to cover Sade – but much of the rest of Friends & Lovers is grown and sexy cool."

== Commercial performance ==
In the United States, Friends & Lovers debuted at number 12 on the Billboard 200 and number two on the Top R&B/Hip-Hop Albums, with first-week sales of 17,200 copies. In its second week, the album dropped to number 45, selling 7,000 copies, bringing its total album sales to 24,000 copies.

== Track listing ==
Credits adapted from liner notes.

No.	Title	Writer(s)	Producer(s)	Length
1.	"Friends & Lovers Intro"	Marsha Ambrosius	Dwayne "Dem Jointz" Abernathy	1:13
2.	"So Good"	Ambrosius; Stacy Barthe; Marcos Palacios; Ernest Clark; Kevin Randolph; Tony Russell	Da Internz	5:14
3.	"Night Time"	Ambrosius; Sam Dew; Kenneth Bartolomei; Erik Reyes-Ortiz; Kevin Crowe	J.U.S.T.I.C.E. League	3:37
4.	"69"	Ambrosius; Palacios; Clark; Randolph; Russell; Luther Campbell; David Hobbs; Mark Ross; Christopher Wongwon	Da Internz	4:40
5.	"Shoes"	Ambrosius; Eric Hudson; Andrew "Hit Drew" Clifton	Hudson; Clifton (add.)	4:33
6.	"How Much More (Interlude)"	Ambrosius	Da Internz	0:53
7.	"Stronger" (featuring Dr. Dre)	Sade Adu; Kendrick Davis; Andrew Hale; Kirk Jones; Chris Martin; Stuart Matthewman; Fred Scruggs, Jr.; Tyrone Taylor; Shelly Manne; Quentin Tarantino	Ambrosius; Dr. Dre (co.)	5:25
8.	"You & I"	Ambrosius; Sterling Simms; Warren "Oak" Felder; Andrew "Pop" Wansel; Morris Stewart	Pop & Oak	4:58
9.	"La La La La La"	Ambrosius; Hudson; Clifton; Barthe; Minnie Riperton; Richard Rudolph	Hudson; Clifton (add.)	3:47
10.	"Cupid (Shot Me Straight Through My Heart)"	Ambrosius; Marcus White; Ken Gold	Seige Monstracity	3:55
11.	"Kiss & Fuck (Interlude)"	Ambrosius	Da Internz	1:17
12.	"Love"	Ambrosius; Jamie Scott	Scott	4:39
13.	"Run"	Ambrosius; Dillon Pace; Jenna Andrews	Ambrosius; Outer Earth	3:47
14.	"Spend All My Time" (featuring Charlie Wilson)	Ambrosius; Hudson; Clifton; Marvin-Paul Ambrosius	Hudson; Clifton (add.)	4:56
15.	"OMG I Miss You"	Ambrosius; Palacios; Clark; Randolph; Mark Pellizer	Da Internz	4:30
16.	"Streets of London" (featuring Skye Edwards & Lindsey Stirling)	Ambrosius; Wansel; Ronald "Flippa" Colson; Jameel Roberts	Ambrosius; Wansel; Colson; Roberts	2:55
Total length:				60:20

Target deluxe edition bonus tracks
No.	Title	Writer(s)	Producer(s)	Length
17.	"Some Things (Interlude)"	Ambrosius; Shenice Williams	Williams	3:14
18.	"Every Now & Again"	Ambrosius; Justin Smith; Andre Harris	Harris	4:24
19.	"Honey Pot"	Aaron Michael Cox; Clark; Palacios; Ambrosius; Barthe	Da Internz	3:25

== Charts ==
=== Weekly charts ===
Chart (2014)	Peak position
US Billboard 200	12
US Top R&B/Hip-Hop Albums (Billboard)	2

=== Year-end charts ===
Chart (2014)	Position
US Top R&B/Hip-Hop Albums (Billboard)	68
