= Far Away (Marsha Ambrosius song) =

Single by Marsha Ambrosius

from the album Late Nights & Early Mornings
- Released: 7 December 2010
- Genre: R&B, soul
- Length: 7:17 (Single/Album Version); 4:17 (Radio Edit)
- Label: J
- Songwriter(s): Marsha Ambrosius, Sterling Simms
- Producer(s): Just Blaze

Marsha Ambrosius singles chronology
"Hope She Cheats On You (With A Basketball Player)" (2010)	"Far Away" (2010)	"Run" (2014)

"Far Away" is a song by English recording artist Marsha Ambrosius. It was released on 7 December 2010 as the second single from her debut studio album, Late Nights & Early Mornings. The album was subsequently released on 1 March 2011. The song was written by Marsha Ambrosius with co-writing by Sterling Simms and production by Just Blaze, in 2008. The song was nominated for Best R&B Performance and Best R&B Song at the 54th Annual GRAMMY Awards.

== Background & composition ==
The track was inspired by one of Ambrosius's own friends who committed suicide, and discusses how it feels once someone she's loved is gone. "Far Away" is a mid tempo R&B song with its lyrics constructed in the common verse-chorus form.

== Remix ==
The official remix features rapper Busta Rhymes on the intro & 1st verse was leaked online on 8 April 2011. An audio track of the remix premiered on 23 May 2011 on Marsha Ambrosius' Vevo account. It was released on 31 May 2011 as a digital download single.

== Music video ==
The music video to "Far Away" premiered on Vevo on Wednesday 6 January 2011 and sparked much controversy towards the concept which involved an African American gay couple, bullying, and suicide. The video featured a written appeal by Ambrosius exhorting viewers to put a stop to bullying and homophobia and prevent suicide, and posted the phone number and URL of the National Suicide Prevention Lifeline at suicidepreventionlifeline.org. The video was nominated for Video of the Year at the BET Awards of 2011.

== Charts ==
=== Weekly charts ===
Chart (2011)	Peak position
US Billboard Hot 100	74
US Hot R&B/Hip-Hop Songs (Billboard)	3

=== Year-end charts ===
Chart (2011)	Position
US Hot R&B/Hip-Hop Songs (Billboard)	5

== See also ==
- "Runaway Train" - 1993 Grammy Award-winning song by Soul Asylum which promoted the names and faces of missing children in numerous territories and appealed to viewers for help in their location
