= Neurotic Society (Compulsory Mix) =

Song by Lauryn Hill

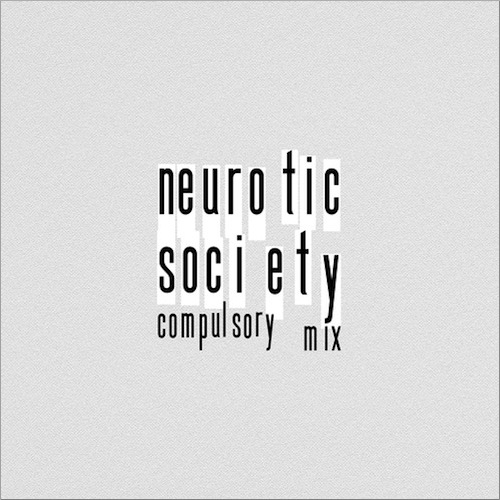

Single by Lauryn Hill
- Released: May 3, 2013
- Recorded: 2013
- Genre: Hip hop; alternative dance
- Length: 4:19
- Label: Obverse Creation Music; Columbia
- Songwriter: Lauryn Hill
- Producer: Lauryn Hill

Lauryn Hill singles chronology
"Repercussions" (2010)	"Neurotic Society (Compulsory Mix)" (2013)	"Consumerism" (2013)

"Neurotic Society (Compulsory Mix)" is a single from American hip hop artist Lauryn Hill. The song was released on May 3, 2013 on iTunes. On the singer's official Tumblr account Hill revealed that she was required to release the single early in light of her recent legal troubles, which is why the song is called a "Compulsory Mix".

== Background ==
"Neurotic Society (Compulsory Mix)" is Hill's first official studio recording since the release of "Turn Your Lights Down Low" in November 1999. "Neurotic Society" is a mid-tempo alternative hip hop song in which Hill raps lyrics at an alarming speed. The lyrics discuss social corruption and corporate manipulation, and their effect on today's youth. The single was announced and released on May 4, 2013 during Hill's tax troubles. During this time Hill reported that she had entered into an agreement with Sony that would allow her to release her own music. Upon the single's release, Hill posted an open letter on her official Facebook page: "Here is a link to a piece that I was 'required' to release immediately, by virtue of the impending legal deadline. I love being able to reach people directly, but in an ideal scenario, I would not have to rush the release of new music... but the message is still there. In light of Wednesday's tragic loss (of former label mate Chris Kelly), I am even more pressed to YELL this to a multitude that may not understand the cost of allowing today's unhealthy paradigms to remain unchecked!" Hill performed the song live for the first time on May 14, 2013 at Brooklyn's Music Hall of Williamsburg.

== Reception ==
In his review for Rolling Stone magazine, music critic Jody Rosen gave the song two-and-a-half out of five stars and said that, although Hill's "quicksilver flow is impressive", her lyrics are "full of gibberish" and come off as "unintentional cringe comedy".

=== Anti-gay controversy ===
The song sparked controversy for its seemingly anti-gay lyrics and message. BET's Monica Miller states: "Whether or not Hill is merely using these comments as examples of the smokescreens and sleight-of-hands that pervade this 'Neurotic Society' is unclear. Beyond intention, these sorts of statements suggest that society is in a shambles because it's been taking too many cues from the LGBTQ community, acting like 'girl men,' 'drag queens' and 'transvestites.' Is her beef with oppressive society or is her issue with people who don't abide by a traditional family structure?" Critics have pointed to lyrics such as "greedy men and pride fiends," followed up with "drag queens", to argue that the song has anti-gay undertones. "Social transvestism" and "subliminal dressed up as piety," have also been spotlighted. Out Magazine's Andrew Belonsky questioned if the "latter" could be aimed at the Catholic Church. Hill later addressed these issues in an open letter on her tumblr page saying that the song is "not targeting any particular group"; rather, she proceeds to explain, that it is "targeting everyone in our society who hides behind neurotic behavior, rather than deal with it". However, she also criticized "political correctness" causing society to move "towards unhealthiness and breakdown."
