= Repercussions (song) =

2010 song by Lauryn Hill

Single by Lauryn Hill
- Released: July 29, 2010
- Recorded: 2009−10
- Genre: Neo soul; R&B
- Length: 3:12
- Label: BoyWonder Entertainment
- Songwriters: Lauryn Hill; Kenny Vaughan; Dana Rivera
- Producer: Dana Rivera

Lauryn Hill singles chronology
"Lose Myself" (2007)	"Repercussions" (2010)	"Neurotic Society (Compulsory Mix)" (2013)

"Repercussions" is a song that was released by American recording artist Lauryn Hill on July 29, 2010, through BoyWonder Entertainment. The song was released as a digital download, and was said to be a cut from her yet to be released upcoming second studio album. It is Hill's first single to be released since 2007's "Lose Myself" and is the first of Hill's singles to chart on the Hot R&B/Hip-Hop Songs chart since her collaborative single "Turn Your Lights Down Low" which was released in November 1999. In August 2010, it debuted at #94 on the chart and ended up peaking at #83 the following week. No music video was released for the track. The song was produced by Dana Rivera.

== Track listing ==
1. "Repercussions" − 3:12

== Charts ==
Chart (2010)	Peak position
U.S. Hot R&B/Hip-Hop Songs	83
