= Truth Hurts (singer) =

American R&B singer

- Born: Shari Watson; October 10, 1971 (age 54)
- Origin: St. Louis, Missouri, U.S.
- Genre: R&B
- Occupations: Singer; songwriter
- Years active: 1997–present
- Labels: Giant; Aftermath; Interscope; Pookie; Humble Sound Records
- Website: truthhurtsofficial.com

Shari Watson (born October 10, 1971), known professionally as Truth Hurts, is an American R&B singer.

== Career ==
After turning down an opera scholarship at the University of Chicago, Watson moved to Los Angeles with friend and aspiring rapper Valerie Webb and created R&B/hip-hop duo, Shug & Dap. They signed to Giant Records in 1993 and released a single in November 1994, "Anotha Man", from their forthcoming debut album entitled First High. However, a few months later, the record executive who discovered and managed them, Cassandra Mills, soon left the label, which left the group unsupported. Consequently, their album was shelved and Shug & Dap were dropped from the label in 1995.

At this point, Watson established herself as a songwriter, writing records for Monifah, Phajja, Ideal, L.V., Eric Benet and others. She most notably co-wrote Shanice's 1999 single "Yesterday".

In 2000, Watson signed to Dr. Dre's Aftermath Entertainment label. She first appeared on Busta Rhymes' 2001 hit single, "Break Ya Neck", as a backing vocalist. In 2001, she played a small role in The Wash starring Dr. Dre and Snoop Dogg, as well as a cameo in the film Ali starring Will Smith. She also appeared as a background vocalist on the D12 song "Nasty Mind". For her first solo LP, Truthfully Speaking, issued on Aftermath in 2002, Truth Hurts enlisted the production talents of Dr. Dre, Timbaland, Hi-Tek, and DJ Quik. Her debut single, "Addictive", was a Top 10 hit in the United States, and featured a verse from hip hop artist Rakim. The original song, Lata Mangeshkar's "Thoda Resham Lagta Hai", was used as the main base of the track within the chorus. The copyright holders sued Aftermath and parent company Interscope Records for $500 million, and issued an injunction against further sales or performances of the record. A judge later ruled that the album was not to be sold without being stickered with proper credits for Mangeshkar. However, a judge eventually dismissed the case against the song, based on the copyright law of India, and sanctioned an attorney over $257,000 for bringing the lawsuit. The song has since become available on streaming services. Among the attorneys for Dr. Dre in the case was noted entertainment litigator Jeffrey D. Goldman.

In summer of 2002, Truth Hurts secured a spot on the Smokin' Grooves tour with Lauryn Hill, Outkast, Cee-Lo Green, The Roots, Jurassic 5, and Erykah Badu. However, following the buzz on "Addictive", Truth Hurts became relatively obscure, only contributing guest vocals to "The Watcher 2" on Jay-Z's Blueprint 2 album and "What" on Eve's Eve-Olution. To date, she remains a one-hit wonder in both America and the UK. "Addictive" was followed up by a song called "The Truth" written by R. Kelly, with whom she collaborated. The song underperformed on American radio and video outlets. This was likely due in part to the negative press Kelly received over sex-crime allegations, that hit media outlets shortly before the single's release.

Truth Hurts returned in 2004 with her second album, Ready Now, on Raphael Saadiq's Pookie Entertainment label. Its first single, "Ready Now", was released in the summer of 2004. In 2005, Truth Hurts collaborated with J Dilla on Jay Love Japan on the track "Ghetto Love", shortly before his death in February 2006. Truth Hurts was recording material for her upcoming album and released a few promo singles via her website. She was promoting this material in Europe while touring at various musical venues.

Watson contributed to John Frusciante's 2011 solo album, but her contribution was eventually left off the album.

== Discography ==
=== Studio albums ===
Title	Album details	Peak positions		
Title	Album details	US	US R&B	UK
Truthfully Speaking	Released: June 25, 2002; Label: Aftermath, Interscope; Formats: CD, digital download	5	4	61
Ready Now	Released: June 1, 2004; Label: Pookie; Formats: CD, digital download	173	46	—
"—" denotes a recording that did not chart or was not released in that territory.

=== Singles ===
- 2002: "Addictive" (featuring Rakim) (US #9, US R&B #2, UK #3, GER #9)
- 2002: "The Truth" (featuring R. Kelly) (US R&B #47)
- 2002: "I'm Not Really Lookin' (featuring DJ Quik)
- 2004: "Ready Now"
- 2010: "Smoke"
- 2015: "Fight 4 Love"
- 2015 : Helping is Trendy (feat. Gorzki and friends)
- 2022: "Cheated"
- 2023: "R&B Love"

== Guest appearances ==
List of non-single guest appearances, with other performing artists, showing year released and album name
Title	Year	Other artist(s)	Album
Appearance as singer in the 2001 film Ali	2001	–	–
"Nasty Mind"	2001	D12	Devil's Night
"Come 2Nyte"	2002	DJ Quik	Under tha Influence
"What!"	2002	Eve	Eve-Olution
"The Watcher 2"	2002	Jay-Z, Dr. Dre, Rakim	The Blueprint 2: The Gift & The Curse
"Fever"	2010	Big Bossolo	Notorious Boss The Birth
"Truth Hurts"	2010	40 Glocc	New World Agenda
"Izbiagai Ot Skukata (LadiDadi)"	2016	Bobo, Lariss	
"This Wave"	2020	James Artissen	Kaleidoscopes
