= Aftermath Entertainment =

American record label

- Parent company: Universal Music Group
- Founded: March 22, 1996; 30 years ago
- Founder: Dr. Dre
- Status: Active
- Distributors: Interscope Records; (US); Polydor Records; (UK and France); Universal Music Group; (international); 12Tone Music/Warner; (Anderson .Paak releases)
- Genre: Hip-hop; R&B
- Country of origin: United States
- Location: Santa Monica, California, U.S.

ARY, Inc., doing business as Aftermath Entertainment, is an American record label founded by rapper and record producer Dr. Dre in 1996. It operates as a subsidiary of Universal Music Group, and is distributed through Interscope Records.

The label's roster includes artists such as Eminem, Marsha Ambrosius, Anderson .Paak, and Ez Mil, while former artists include 50 Cent, Kendrick Lamar, Busta Rhymes, The Game, Eve and Stat Quo, among others.

== History ==
Upon his departure from Death Row Records on March 22, 1996, Dr. Dre quickly launched Aftermath Entertainment through Death Row's former parent label, Interscope Records. It was founded as a "boutique label" that prides itself on "quality over quantity", focusing on small numbers of high-profile releases.

A few months prior to the release of his compilation album and the label's first release, Dr. Dre Presents: The Aftermath, a July 1996 Source magazine article titled 'Dr. Dre Leaves Death Row' featured the producer discussing his departure and hinting at new tracks, "East Coast/West Coast Killaz" and RBX's "Blunt Time". The first single/video for the album was the aforementioned "East Coast/West Coast Killaz", which was released amidst the height of the East Coast–West Coast hip-hop rivalry and nearly two months after 2Pac's murder. The track featured B-Real, RBX, Nas and KRS1, under the name Group Therapy and the music video even featured a cameo from Southern rap star Scarface. The track appealed to artists to "kill that noise" and end the verbal sparring and hostilities. Though critically acclaimed, the track failed to make a major impression in mainstream radio play and influence. The same held true for Dr. Dre's second single for the album, "Been There, Done That", in which Dre performs solo. It received some moderate video play on MTV and BET, but featured a more subdued and laid back version of Dre, that failed to make a huge impact commercially. These singles were released well ahead of the album, along with a feature segment on Dre that ran repeatedly on MTV. The album entered the charts at #6 and went platinum. Mel-Man appeared as a solo rapper/producer for the cut "Shttin On The World" and would remain a key producer for the label on upcoming projects.

A year later, on October 21, 1997, Aftermath released the only collaborative project by hip-hop supergroup The Firm, composed of Nas, Foxy Brown, AZ and Nature. Despite the album featuring Nas and Dr. Dre , debuting atop the Billboard 200 and being certified platinum, it sold below commercial expectation. The group was subsequently dropped from Aftermath and later disbanded.

Upon recommendation from Interscope co-founder and Dre's close friend, Jimmy Iovine, he signed Eminem to Aftermath on March 9, 1998. On February 23, 1999, Eminem's major-label debut album, The Slim Shady LP was released. The album debuted at number two on the Billboard 200 and number one on the Top R&B/Hip-Hop Albums chart, going on to be certified quadruple platinum. Also in 1999, on November 16, after a seven-year hiatus from releasing an album, Aftermath released 2001, Dr. Dre's follow-up to his 1992 album, The Chronic. The album went on to be certified sextuple platinum.

Several more artists were signed to, and later dropped from Aftermath, including Hittman, Rakim, King T, Dawn Robinson and Eve, due to production, creative or business conflicts. Following the June 25, 2002 release of her debut album under Aftermath, Truthfully Speaking, singer Truth Hurts, Dr. Dre and producer DJ Quik faced a multi-million dollar lawsuit from Lata Mangeshkar over the unauthorized usage of one of her songs as a sample for her hit single, "Addictive". This caused sales from her debut album to dwindle and Truth Hurts to subsequently cut ties with the label soon after.

In 2002, New York City rapper 50 Cent signed to Aftermath by Dr. Dre through a joint venture with Eminem's Shady Records for $1 million. That same year, Compton rapper The Game signed with the label in 2002 through a joint venture with 50 Cent's G-Unit Records, after a negotiation between Dre and Iovine.

50 Cent's official debut album, Get Rich or Die Tryin', was released on February 6, 2003, through the three labels. It featured production from Dr. Dre and Eminem, who also executive produced the album. Highly anticipated and anchored by the success of the singles "21 Questions", "If I Can't" and the number one hit, "In da Club", the album debuted at number one on the Billboard 200. Selling 872,000 copies in its first week, the album went on to be certified 9× Platinum by the Recording Industry Association of America in 2020 with "In da Club" going diamond in 2023.

On January 18, 2005, Aftermath and G-Unit released his commercial debut album, The Documentary, to commercial success and critical acclaim. It stood upon the Billboard 200's number one position for a total of two weeks and went on to sell two million copies in the United States. Dr. Dre and 50 served as executive producers for The Documentary, and featured guest appearances from Aftermath artists Eminem, 50 Cent and Busta Rhymes. That March, 50 Cent released his second studio album, The Massacre, which set a record as the sixth fastest selling album since Nielsen SoundScan started tracking albums in 1991, with 1.14 million albums sold in four days. The album was a commercial success, and was only 32,000 records away from being the best-selling album of the year. The Massacre included the hit single, Candy Shop, which debuted at number 1 on the Billboard Hot 100. As of 2025, the album has been certified sextuple platinum in America, and total worldwide sales stand at nine million copies. It has sold over nine million copies worldwide. Shortly after the release of The Documentary, tensions between The Game and 50 Cent ignited, with the latter dropping the former from G-Unit during an interview on a radio show, which provoked a shooting, causing Game's friend to sustain a non-fatal bullet wound in his leg. After a truce, Game and 50 continued to clash through interviews and diss tracks, with the former catapulting the catchphrase, "G-Unot", a parody and boycott of G-Unit.

Due to The Game's feud with 50 Cent, in 2006, he was transferred from Interscope to its sister label, Geffen Records, which is also a part of Universal Music's Interscope Geffen A&M Records, to help terminate his contractual obligations with Aftermath and G-Unit. Busta Rhymes was signed and released one album on June 13, 2006, The Big Bang, which would later debut at number one, becoming his first and only album in his career to make the number one slot on the Billboard 200. In 2008, after internal conflict with Jimmy Iovine over the delaying of his planned eighth studio album, Blessed, Busta Rhymes was released from Interscope, causing him to lose his deal with Aftermath. The album would later be reworked into Back on My B.S. which would later be released in the spring of 2009, under Interscope's now-defunct sister label, Universal Motown, in conjunction with his own label, Flipmode Entertainment (now Conglomerate).

Stat Quo, a rapper from Atlanta, was released from Aftermath and Eminem's Shady Records in 2008 after being a part of the joint deal for five years, citing differences in direction over whether or not to release his debut album, Statlanta. The album was later reworked and released independently in the summer of 2010.

Philadelphia rapper Eve, who had returned to the label in 2004, following her previous label, Ruff Ryders Entertainment, ending their distribution deal with Interscope, also ended her relationship with Aftermath for the second time, leaving the label in December 2007. The first time Eve joined Aftermath and was later dropped in 1998 in exchange for the label signing would-be labelmate, Eminem, she claimed to be "devastated". The second time is over Interscope and Geffen's delaying of her fourth studio album, Here I Am, which was set to be released under Aftermath, Swizz Beatz's Full Surface Records and Interscope's Geffen. Following a falling out with Interscope co-founder Jimmy Iovine, Eve parted ways with Interscope Geffen A&M in December 2009 and went on a four-year hiatus from music, before returning with her reworked fourth album, now titled Lip Lock, released independently in 2013.

In January 2010, it was revealed that Bishop Lamont had left the label, due to the delaying of his debut, The Reformation, while singer Marsha Ambrosius had also left the label the same year to sign with J Records.

In March 2012, it was announced that Kendrick Lamar had signed with the label jointly through Top Dawg Entertainment. That October, his album, Good Kid, M.A.A.D City, was released. It received commercial and critical acclaim, being regarded as one of the best hip-hop albums of that year and decade.

In October 2013, Jon Connor announced his signing to Aftermath during the 2013 BET Hip Hop Awards. However, in May 2019, he parted ways with the label after his planned debut album, Vehicle City, was delayed, ending his four-year relationship with Dre. On February 20, 2014, 50 Cent announced his departure from Interscope Records, which included his joint deal with Aftermath and Shady. He later signed to his own imprint, G-Unit Records, in a new distribution deal with Interscope's sister label, Capitol Records' former independent faction, Caroline Records (now Virgin Music).

On March 15, 2015, Kendrick Lamar's third studio album, To Pimp a Butterfly, was released a week earlier than expected, due to a marketing error on behalf of Interscope. Despite this, the album received widespread acclaim and debuted at number one on the Billboard 200, becoming Lamar's first in his career to do so. On August 7, after fifteen years and nine months of not releasing an official album, Dr. Dre released his latest album, Compton, in promotion for the year's biopic, Straight Outta Compton, which chronicled the rise and fall of Dre's previous group, N.W.A. The album debuted at number two on the Billboard 200. Through the album, Anderson .Paak, one of its core features, was in talks to sign with Aftermath. The deal did not complete until January 2016. However, Anderson was not signed to Interscope through the imprint, instead signing a management deal with Doug Morris' 12Tone Music. Through these labels, he released two albums, Oxnard (2018) and Ventura (2019).

In December 2021, Dr. Dre confirmed that he had finished recording Casablanco, an album with Marsha Ambrosius, with both artists describing the finished product as some of their “best work”. The album was released in June 2024 to critical acclaim.

In May 2022, Kendrick Lamar announced his final album under Top Dawg, a double album titled Mr. Morale & the Big Steppers. It was released under TDE and Aftermath without further input from Dr. Dre nor Top Dawg affiliates. He then shifted his focus on his own production label, PGLang.

In 2023, it was announced and later confirmed that after 50 Cent and Stat Quo, Filipino rapper Ez Mil has officially signed to Aftermath and Shady.

In 2024, Snoop Dogg, Dr. Dre's collaborator since 1992, signed with the label to record his upcoming twentieth studio album Missionary, entirely produced by Dr. Dre. The album was released on December 13, 2024, via Dr. Dre's then-defunct founded and Snoop Dogg-revived record label Death Row Records. Snoop Dogg described the album as a "spiritual successor" to his debut, Doggystyle.

== Roster ==
=== Current acts ===
Act	Years	Releases
Dr. Dre	Founder	3
Eminem	1998–	13
Marsha Ambrosius	2006–2009; 2023–	1
Anderson .Paak	2016–	2
Ez Mil	2023–	1

=== Former artists ===
Act	Years on the label	Releases under the label
RBX	1996–1999	–
Serenade	1996–1998	–
King T	1996–2001	– (Note: The album was originally titled 'The Kingdom Come' and was slated for a release on 'June 30, 1998', on Aftermath Entertainment.)
Nowl	1996–1998	–
Sharief	1996–1998	–
R.C.	1996–1998	–
Hands-On	1996–1998	–
The Firm	1997–1998	1
Dawn Robinson	1997–1998	–
The Last Emperor	1997–1998	–
Eve	1998–1999, 2004–2007	–
Hittman	1998–2001	–
Rakim	2000–2003	–
Shaunta	2000–2003	–
Truth Hurts	2001–2003	1
Joe Beast	2001–2003	–
Brooklyn	2001–2003	–
50 Cent	2002–2014	5
Ice Cube	2002–2004	–
The Game	2002–2006	1
Stat Quo	2003–2008	–
Busta Rhymes	2004–2008	1
Suga Suga	2005–2009	–
Dion	2005–2007	–
G.A.G.E.	2005–2007	–
Bishop Lamont	2005–2010	–
Joell Ortiz	2006–2008	–
YV	2006–2012	–
Bohagon	2008–2012	–
Jibbs	2008–2012	–
Hayes	2009–2010	–
Slim the Mobster	2009–2012	–
Kendrick Lamar	2012–2022	5
Jon Connor	2013–2019	–
Justus	2015–2016	–
Silk Sonic	2021–2022	1
Snoop Dogg	2023–2024	1

=== Former producers ===
Producer	Years on the label
Chris "The Glove" Taylor	1996–1999
Bud'da	1996–2001
Mel-Man	1996–2004
Flossy P	1996–1999
Stu-B-Doo	1996–1999

== Discography ==
=== Studio albums ===
Artist	Album	Details
The Firm	The Album	Released: October 21, 1997; Chart positions: #1 U.S.; RIAA certification: Platinum
Eminem	The Slim Shady LP	Released: February 23, 1999; Chart positions: #2 U.S.; RIAA certification: 5× Platinum
Dr. Dre	2001	Released: November 16, 1999; Chart positions: #2 U.S.; RIAA certification: 7× Platinum
Eminem	The Marshall Mathers LP	Released: May 23, 2000; Chart positions: #1 U.S.; RIAA certification: Diamond
Eminem	The Eminem Show (released with Shady)	Released: May 26, 2002; Chart positions: #1 U.S.; RIAA certification: Diamond
Truth Hurts	Truthfully Speaking	Released: June 25, 2002; Chart positions: #5 U.S.; RIAA certification: —
50 Cent	Get Rich or Die Tryin' (released with Shady and G-Unit)	Released: February 6, 2003; Chart positions: #1 U.S.; RIAA certification: 9× Platinum
Eminem	Encore (released with Shady)	Released: November 12, 2004; Chart positions: #1 U.S.; RIAA certification: 5× Platinum
The Game	The Documentary (released with G-Unit)	Released: January 18, 2005; Chart positions: #1 U.S.; RIAA certification: 2× Platinum
50 Cent	The Massacre (released with Shady and G-Unit)	Released: March 3, 2005; Chart positions: #1 U.S.; RIAA certification: 6× Platinum
Busta Rhymes	The Big Bang (released with Flipmode)	Released: June 13, 2006; Chart positions: #1 U.S.; RIAA certification: Gold
50 Cent	Curtis (released with Shady and G-Unit)	Released: September 11, 2007; Chart positions: #2 U.S.; RIAA certification: Platinum
Eminem	Relapse (released with Shady)	Released: May 15, 2009; Chart positions: #1 U.S.; RIAA certification: 3× Platinum
50 Cent	Before I Self Destruct (released with Shady and G-Unit)	Released: November 9, 2009; Chart positions: #4 U.S.; RIAA certification: Gold
Eminem	Recovery (released with Shady)	Released: June 18, 2010; Chart positions: #1 U.S.; RIAA certification: 8× Platinum
Kendrick Lamar	Good Kid, M.A.A.D City (released with Top Dawg)	Released: October 22, 2012; Chart positions: #2 U.S.; RIAA certification: 3× Platinum
Eminem	The Marshall Mathers LP 2 (released with Shady)	Released: November 5, 2013; Chart positions: #1 U.S.; RIAA certification: 4× Platinum
Kendrick Lamar	To Pimp a Butterfly (released with Top Dawg)	Released: March 15, 2015; Chart positions: #1 U.S.; RIAA certification: Platinum
Dr. Dre	Compton	Released: August 7, 2015; Chart positions: #2 U.S.; RIAA certification: Gold
Kendrick Lamar	Damn (released with Top Dawg)	Released: April 14, 2017; Chart positions: #1 U.S.; RIAA certification: 3× Platinum
Eminem	Revival (released with Shady)	Released: December 15, 2017; Chart positions: #1 U.S.; RIAA certification: Platinum
Eminem	Kamikaze (released with Shady)	Released: August 31, 2018; Chart positions: #1 U.S.; RIAA certification: Platinum
Anderson .Paak	Oxnard (released with 12Tone Music)	Released: November 16, 2018; Chart positions: #11 U.S.; RIAA certification: —
Anderson .Paak	Ventura (released with 12Tone Music)	Released: April 12, 2019; Chart positions: #4 U.S.; RIAA certification: —
Eminem	Music to Be Murdered By (released with Shady)	Released: January 17, 2020; Chart positions: #1 U.S.; RIAA certification: Platinum
Silk Sonic	An Evening with Silk Sonic (released with Atlantic)	Released: November 12, 2021; Chart positions: #2 U.S.; RIAA certification: Platinum
Kendrick Lamar	Mr. Morale & the Big Steppers (released with Top Dawg and PGLang)	Released: May 13, 2022; Chart positions: #1 U.S.; RIAA certification: Gold
Ez Mil	DU4LI7Y: REDUX (released with Shady)	Released: August 11, 2023; Chart positions: —
Marsha Ambrosius	Casablanco	Released: June 28, 2024; Chart positions: —
Eminem	The Death of Slim Shady (Coup de Grâce) (released with Shady)	Released: July 12, 2024; Chart positions: #1 U.S.; RIAA certification: —
Snoop Dogg	Missionary (released with Death Row)	Released: December 13, 2024; Chart positions: #20 U.S.

=== Compilation albums ===
Artist	Album	Details
Various Artists	Dr. Dre Presents: The Aftermath	Released: November 26, 1996; Chart positions: #6 U.S.; RIAA certification: Platinum
Various Artists	The Wash	Released: November 6, 2001; Chart positions: #19 U.S.; RIAA certification: Gold
Eminem	Curtain Call: The Hits (released with Shady)	Released: December 6, 2005; Chart positions: #1 U.S.; RIAA certification: Diamond
Kendrick Lamar	Untitled Unmastered (released with Top Dawg)	Released: March 4, 2016; Chart positions: #1 U.S.; RIAA certification: —
50 Cent	Best of 50 Cent (released with Shady)	Released: March 31, 2017; Chart position: #119 U.S.; RIAA certification: —
Various Artists	Black Panther (released with Top Dawg)	Released: February 9, 2018; Chart positions: #1 U.S.; RIAA certification: Platinum
Eminem	Curtain Call 2 (released with Shady)	Released: August 5, 2022; Chart positions: #6 U.S.; RIAA certification: —
