= Marsha Ambrosius =

English singer and songwriter (born 1977)

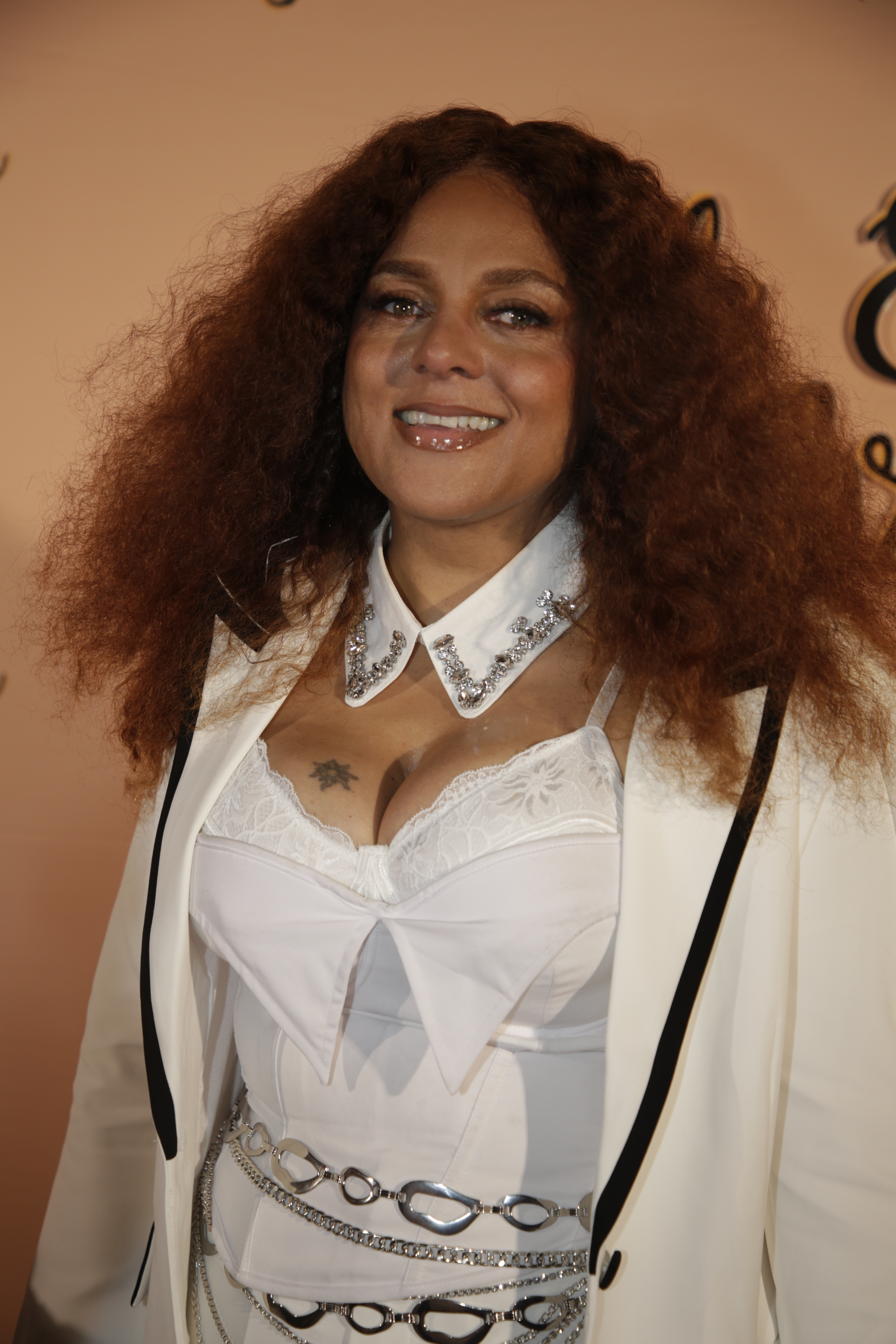
- Ambrosius at the Black Excellence Brunch 2026.

Background information
- Also known as: The Songstress
- Born: Marsha Angelique Ambrosius; 8 August 1977 (age 49)
- Origin: Liverpool, England
- Genres: R&B
- Years active: 1997–present
- Labels: Interscope; Aftermath; J; RCA; E1; Geffen
- Member of: Floetry; Knightwritaz
- Spouse: Dez Billups (m. 2017)
- Children: 1

Marsha Ambrosius-Billups, born Marsha Angelique Ambrosius (born 8 August 1977) is an English singer and songwriter. She began her music career in the early 2000s with Floetry, achieving both critical acclaim and commercial success. Following the group's disbandment, Ambrosius released her debut solo album, Late Nights & Early Mornings, in 2011. The album debuted at number two on the US Billboard 200, topped the Top R&B/Hip-Hop Albums chart, and included the single "Far Away", which earned two Grammy Award nominations and won The Ashford & Simpson Songwriter's Award at the Soul Train Music Awards.

Over the course of her career, Ambrosius has received ten Grammy Award nominations and nominations at the BET Awards, MOBO Awards, American Music Awards, and Soul Train Music Awards. As a songwriter, she is known for penning, and providing backing vocals on Michael Jackson's "Butterflies", and has written for artists including Alicia Keys, H.E.R., Solange, and Angie Stone. She has also collaborated extensively with hip hop artists, featuring on Kanye West's "The One" from Cruel Summer (2012) and appearing on four tracks from Dr. Dre's Compton (2015). Her later solo albums include Friends & Lovers (2014), Nyla (2018), and Casablanco (2024).

== Musical career ==
=== Early career with Floetry ===
Original Floetry members Marsha Ambrosius and Natalie Stewart met through their love of basketball. Both Stewart and Ambrosius attended the BRIT School for Performing Arts and Technology where Ambrosius studied Business and Finance and Stewart Performing Arts, Media and Art. For college Ambrosius planned to attend the Georgia Institute of Technology in Atlanta, Georgia, but could not due to an injury. Stewart attended Middlesex University in London and later transferred to North London University. During these years, the women kept in touch. Stewart was a founding member of the performance poetry group 3 Plus 1 which was rising to Han Solo in London, Birmingham and Manchester. In 1999, Ambrosius wrote and submitted a song to her publishers Perfect Songs called "Fantasize", inviting Stewart to lend some of her poetry to the song. This collaboration led to the creation of Floetry.

=== Group success ===
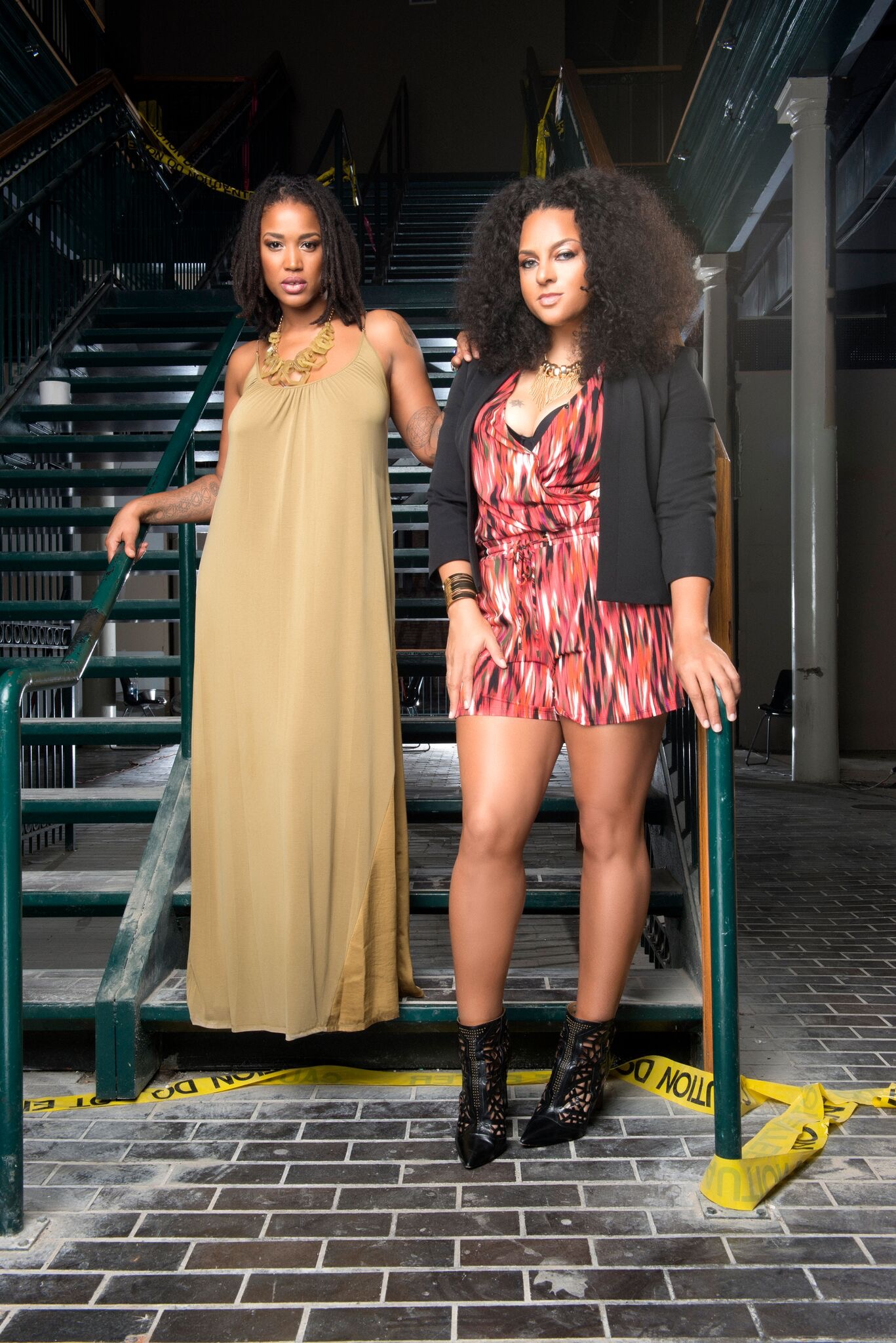
Floetry during their reunion in February 2016. Left, Natalie Stewart AKA The Floacist, Right, Ambrosius.

In 2000, the duo travelled to the United States to perform on the poetry circuit. After frequenting spoken word/poetry spots in Atlanta such as Yin Yang Poets' Cafe (to positive reviews), they moved on to Philadelphia. There they met Darren "Limitless" Henson and Keith "Keshon" Pelzer of DJ Jazzy Jeff's Touch Of Jazz studio and began recording. She also worked with Michael Jackson - she composed and sang as back-vocal the song "Butterflies" from the album Invincible released in 2001 and in 2002 a single version of this song was published. In the same year, they signed with DreamWorks Records and released their debut album Floetic, which featured the singles "Floetic" "Say Yes" and "Getting Late". The album was also released in the UK with additional tracks, one of which features British singer/songwriter and producer Sebastian Rogers. They released two more albums: 2003's live effort Floacism and 2005's studio album Flo'Ology.

=== Solo career ===
Ambrosius has been featured on many songs including Styles P's "I'm Black"; The Game's "Start from Scratch" and "Why You Hate The Game." (also featuring Nas); Busta Rhymes' "Get You Some" and "Cocaina"; Nas' "Hustlers" (also featuring The Game); and Hi-Tek's "Music for Life" and Jamie Foxx's "Freak'in Me". The group has also collaborated with Earth, Wind & Fire on their album, Illumination, on the track "Elevated". She provided background vocals to the Justin Timberlake single “Cry Me a River”, notably singing the ad lib “Cry me, cry meeee” at the end of the song. She collaborated once again with Slum Village on a song called "Cloud 9". In 2009, she guested on Wale's "Diary".

=== Aftermath Entertainment ===
Ambrosius was approached to sign to Dr. Dre's record label, Aftermath Entertainment, as a solo musician/songwriter/producer. In 2007, she released a mixtape entitled, Neo Soul is Dead. Parting ways with the offer in early 2009, Ambrosius pursued her song-writing/production career landing her placements with R&B and hip hop artists ranging from Alicia Keys, Raven-Symoné, Jamie Foxx and Mario to Fabolous, Slum Village and Wale.

=== Late Nights & Early Mornings ===
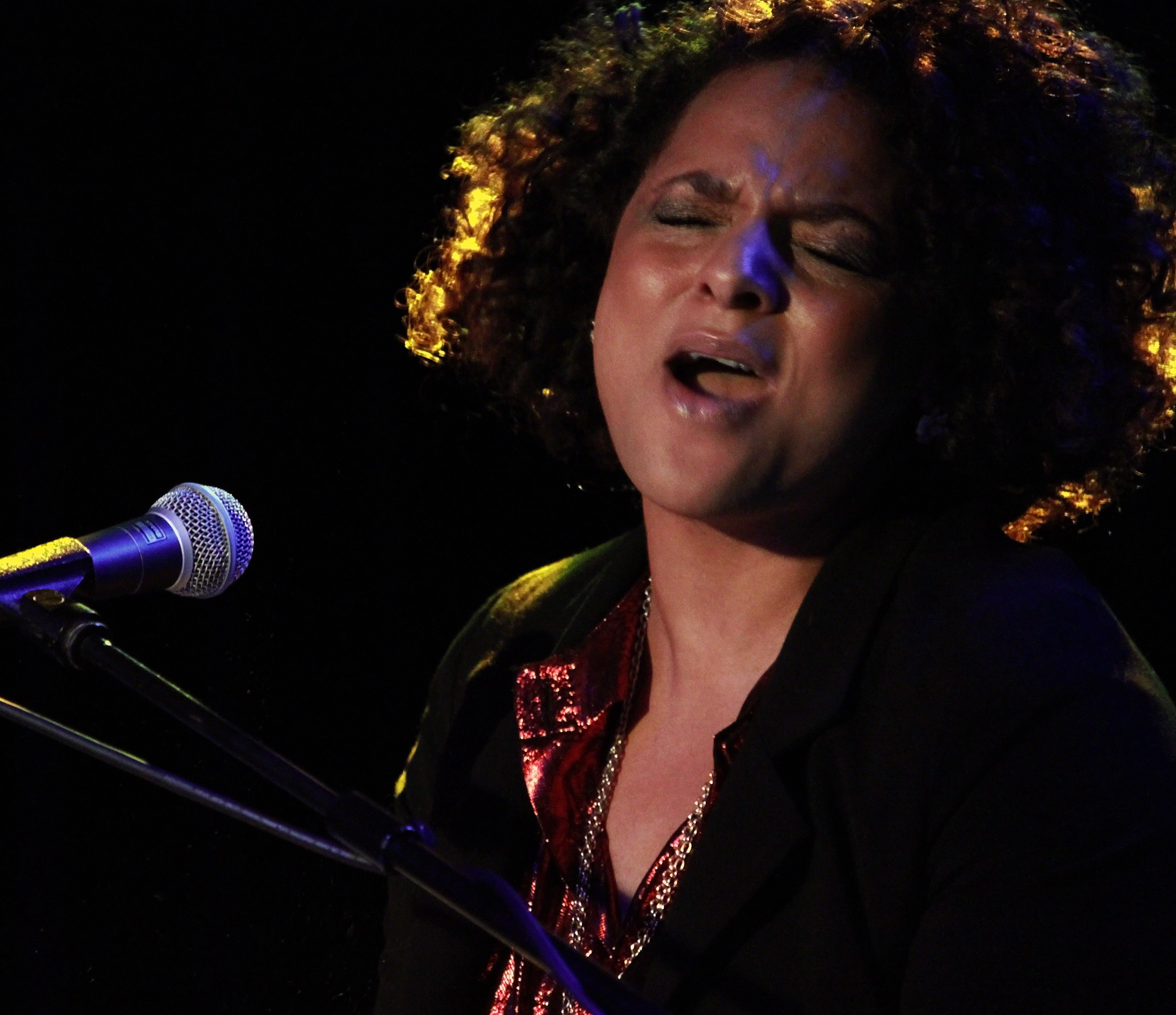
Ambrosius performing in London, December 2010.

In summer 2009, Ambrosius was approached by numerous record labels offering her a solo deal after a long-awaited performance at NYC's SOB's where a sold-out crowd gathered to a show accompanied by The Roots and DJ Aktive. In December 2009, Ambrosius signed to J Records and her solo debut Late Nights & Early Mornings was released on 1 March 2011. "Hope She Cheats On You (With A Basketball Player)" produced by Canei Finch was released as the album's first single on 13 August 2010. The song charted on the US Billboard Hot R&B/Hip-Hop Songs chart and peaked at No. 22. "Far Away" was released as the album's second single on 7 December 2010. The album would debut at No. 1 on the US Billboard R&B Albums chart and No. 2 on the US Billboard 200 behind Adele and ahead of Mumford & Sons, marking the first time in over 20 years that British acts had topped the US charts.

Ambrosius won the Centric Award at the BET Awards of 2011. She was also nominated for Best Female R&B Artist at the BET Awards 2012.

Ambrosius won the Record of The Year (Ashford & Simpson Songwriters Award) at the 2011 Soul Train Awards for the song "Far Away."

In December 2011, she received two Grammy nominations (Best R&B Song / Best R&B Performance for "Far Away"), the night before she performed at the White House with the President and First Family at the National Christmas Tree lighting.

=== Friends & Lovers ===
In August 2011, RCA Music Group announced it was disbanding J Records along with Arista Records and Jive Records. With the shutdown, Ambrosius (and all other artists previously signed to these three labels) will release her future material on the RCA Records brand.

Ambrosius released her second studio album, titled Friends & Lovers, in July 2014. Ambrosius received two MOBO Award nominations for the album. In 2015 Ambrosius received a nomination for Grammy Award for Best Traditional R&B Performance for "As," a collaboration she recorded with Anthony Hamilton for The Best Man Holiday.

=== Nyla ===
In March 2017, she premiered a new song "Don't Wake the Baby" produced by Dem Jointz and called it "a song for Beyoncé." Additionally, she announced a summer tour with Eric Benet titled The M.E. Tour.

In May, she released her first single "Luh Ya" off her upcoming untitled album, marking her move to an independent label.

In June 2018, she released the album's second single "Old Times" and premiered the music video. In September, she announced her third studio album would be titled Nyla and will be released on September 28. The album's third single, "Flood" was also released.

=== Casablanco ===
In December 2021, Dr. Dre has confirmed that he has finished recording Casablanco, an album with Ambrosius, with both artists describing the finished product as some of their "best work". The Section Quartet's founder and violinist Eric Gorfain also confirmed that he’d worked on the album. In February 2023, Ambrosius and Dre held a listening session for the project in Los Angeles. In December 2023, Ambrosius released the first single from the album The Greatest, under Aftermath and Interscope Records. The song was produced by Ambrosius, Dr. Dre and his production team, The ICU. The album was released on 27 June 2024 via Aftermath/Interscope Records.

== Personal life ==
In November 2016, Ambrosius announced she was engaged to Dez Billups. In an interview in 2018, she revealed that she and Dez were married in 2017. They welcomed their first child Nyla in December 2016. Ambrosius is a fan of Liverpool F.C.

Ambrosius is an honorary member of Sigma Gamma Rho.

== Discography ==
=== Studio albums ===
List of studio albums, with selected details, chart positions and sales
| Title | Album details | Peak chart positions | | | Sales |
| Title | Album details | US | US R&B | US Indie | Sales |
|---|---|---|---|---|---|
| Late Nights & Early Mornings | Release date: 1 March 2011; Label: J | 2 | 1 | — | US: 420,000 |
| Friends & Lovers | Release date: 15 July 2014; Label: RCA | 12 | 2 | — | US: 72,000 |
| Nyla | Release date: 28 September 2018; Label: Human Resources/eOne | — | — | 18 | |
| Casablanco | Release date: 28 June 2024; Label: Aftermath/Interscope | — | — | — | |

=== Singles ===
List of singles, with selected chart positions and parent album
| Title | Year | Peak chart positions | | | | Album |
| Title | Year | US | US R&B | US Adult R&B | KOR Int. | Album |
|---|---|---|---|---|---|---|
| "Hope She Cheats on You (With a Basketball Player)" | 2010 | 88 | 22 | 15 | — | Late Nights & Early Mornings |
| "Far Away" (featuring Busta Rhymes) | 2010 | 74 | 3 | 1 | — | Late Nights & Early Mornings |
| "Late Nights & Early Mornings" | 2011 | — | 30 | 12 | — | Late Nights & Early Mornings |
| "Cold War" | 2012 | — | 45^{[A]} | 18 | — | Non-album singles |
| "Without You" (with Ne-Yo) | 2013 | — | — | 21 | 72 | Non-album singles |
| "Run" | 2014 | — | 44^{[A]} | 13 | — | Friends & Lovers |
| "Stronger" (featuring Dr. Dre) | 2014 | — | — | — | — | Friends & Lovers |
| "Don't Wake the Baby" | 2017 | — | — | — | — | Non-album single |
| "Luh Ya" | 2017 | — | — | 20 | — | Nyla |
| "Old Times" | 2018 | — | — | 17 | — | Nyla |
| "Flood" | 2018 | — | — | — | — | Nyla |
| "Bye" (featuring Rei Ami) | 2020 | — | — | — | — | Non-album single |
| "The Greatest" | 2023 | — | — | — | — | Casablanco |
| "One Night Stand" | 2024 | — | — | — | — | Casablanco |
| "Greedy" | 2024 | — | — | — | — | Casablanco |

^{A} Charted on US R&B Airplay

=== Guest appearances ===
List of non-single guest appearances, with other performing artists, showing year released and album name
| Title | Year | Other artist(s) | Album |
|---|---|---|---|
| "Start from Scratch" | 2005 | The Game | The Documentary |
| "Get You Some" | 2006 | Busta Rhymes, Q-Tip | The Big Bang |
| "Cocaina" | 2006 | Busta Rhymes | The Big Bang |
| "Music for Life" | 2006 | Hi-Tek, Nas, J Dilla, Busta Rhymes, Common | Hi-Teknology²: The Chip |
| "Why You Hate the Game" | 2006 | The Game, Nas | Doctor's Advocate |
| "Hustlers" | 2006 | Nas, The Game | Hip Hop Is Dead |
| "I'm Black" | 2006 | Styles P | Time Is Money |
| "This Can't Be Real" | 2007 | Freeway | Free at Last |
| "Reunion" | 2007 | Ya Boy | Optimus Rime |
| "Wanna Go Back" | 2008 | Solange, Q-Tip | Sol-Angel and the Hadley St. Dreams |
| "The Light '08 (It's Love)" | 2008 | Common | —N/a |
| "Freak'in Me" | 2008 | Jamie Foxx | Intuition |
| "If I Ruled the World '09" | 2009 | Nas | —N/a |
| "Yacht Music" | 2009 | DJ Drama, Nas, Willie the Kid, Scarface | Gangsta Grillz: The Album (Vol. 2) |
| "Stay" | 2009 | Fabolous | Loso's Way |
| "Take Me Away (With You)" | 2009 | Queen Latifah | Persona |
| "Diary" | 2009 | Wale | Attention Deficit |
| "A's & E's" | 2009 | Masta Ace, Ed O.G. | Arts & Entertainment |
| "Welcome Back" | 2010 | Stat Quo | Statlanta |
| "All I Got to Give" | 2010 | John Regan | Sorry I'm Late |
| "It's Alright" | 2011 | Saigon | The Greatest Story Never Told |
| "Streets Gone Love Me" | 2012 | Saint Nick | —N/a |
| "Light Dreams" | 2012 | Tyga | Careless World: Rise of the Last King |
| "Take You There" | 2012 | Currensy | The Stoned Immaculate |
| "The One" | 2012 | Kanye West, Big Sean, 2 Chainz | Cruel Summer |
| "The Game Changer" | 2012 | Saigon | The Greatest Story Never Told Chapter 2: Bread and Circuses |
| "Right Back" | 2012 | Freeway | Diamond In the Ruff |
| "It Only Gets Better" | 2013 | Talib Kweli | Prisoner of Conscious |
| "Material Things" | 2013 | Lee Mazin | In My Own Lane |
| "Trust" | 2013 | Robert Glasper Experiment | Black Radio 2 |
| "Alone Together" | 2014 | Daley | Days & Nights |
| "Wonder What You're Doing for the Rest of Your Life" | 2014 | Train | Bulletproof Picasso |
| "War" | 2015 | King Los | God, Money, War |
| "Genocide" | 2015 | Dr. Dre, Kendrick Lamar, Candice Pillay | Compton |
| "All in a Day's Work" | 2015 | Dr. Dre, Anderson Paak | Compton |
| "Darkside / Gone" | 2015 | Dr. Dre, King Mez, Kendrick Lamar | Compton |
| "Satisfiction" | 2015 | Dr. Dre, Snoop Dogg, King Mez | Compton |
| "Make it Through the Night" | 2015 | Joe Budden, Jadakiss | All Love Lost |
| "Dope" | 2016 | T.I. | Non-album single |
| "Sins of Our Fathers" | 2016 | The Game | The Birth of a Nation: The Inspired By Album |
| "Love Star" | 2016 | Common, PJ | Black America Again |
| "See I Miss Pt. 2" | 2016 | GoldLink | —N/a |
| "Melatonin" | 2016 | A Tribe Called Quest, Abbey Smith | We Got It from Here... Thank You 4 Your Service |
| "Anywhere" | 2016 | Tech N9ne | The Storm |
| "No Chill" | 2017 | Davion Farris | Trenier |
| "Real Big" | 2018 | Nipsey Hussle | Victory Lap |
| "Grateful" | 2018 | Dave East | Paranoia 2 |
| "Outside" | 2018 | Royce da 5'9", Robert Glasper | Book of Ryan |
| "Forgiven" | 2019 | 2 Chainz | Rap or Go to the League |
| "I Didn't Wanna Write This Song" | 2019 | The Game | Born 2 Rap |
| "Moonlight" | 2023 | 2 Chainz, Lil Wayne | Welcome 2 Collegrove |
| "Game Recognize Game" | 2026 | The Game | The Documentary III |

=== Writing credits ===
- 2001: "Butterflies" – Michael Jackson (Invincible)
- 2002: "Simple Things", "Beautiful Eyes", "Lonely", "This Love", "Take You High" – Glenn Lewis (World Outside My Window)
- 2004: "My Man" – Angie Stone (Stone Love)
- 2006: "Circus" – Kelis (Kelis Was Here)
- 2007: "Go Ahead" – Alicia Keys (As I Am)
- 2008: "Wanna Go Back" – Solange featuring Marsha Ambrosius and Q-Tip (SoL-AngeL and the Hadley St. Dreams)
- 2008: "Love Me or Leave Me" – Raven-Symoné (Raven-Symoné)
- 2008: "Do About It", "Mirror" – Girlicious (Girlicious)
- 2008: "Music (All I Need)" – Jazmine Sullivan
- 2009: "Matter" – Letoya (Lady Love)
- 2009: "25 to Life" – JoJo
- 2015: "Picture Perfect", "When We Make Love" – Tyrese (Black Rose)
- 2018: "Knock You Out" – Mya
- 2018: "My Song" – H.E.R.
