= Touch the Sky Tour =

2005–06 concert tour by Kanye West

- Tour by Kanye West
- Location: North America; United Kingdom; Australia
- Associated album: Late Registration
- Start date: October 11, 2005
- End date: April 22, 2006
- Legs: 3
- No. of shows: 57
- Supporting acts: Fantasia; Keyshia Cole; Lupe Fiasco
- Box office: US$8 million (Note: Amount grossed over the first 46 dates.)

Kanye West concert chronology
- School Spirit Tour (2004); Touch the Sky Tour (2005–06); Glow in the Dark Tour (2008)

The Touch the Sky Tour was the second tour by American rapper Kanye West, in support of his second studio album, Late Registration (2005). Def Jam announced the first tour dates across North America in September 2005, three months before West announced the second leg in the United Kingdom. The rapper explained that he saw his fans as motivation for the tour, while he also detailed his love for performing. The tour's stage design was handled by Es Devlin, who West hired after firing the initial designer. It began on October 11, 2005, at the University of Miami Convocation Center, and finished at the University of North Carolina Wilmington on April 22, 2006, spanning 57 dates. As well as the United States and UK legs, West traveled a third leg across Australia in March 2006.

West was frequently accompanied by Fantasia, Keyshia Cole, and Lupe Fiasco on the tour, with a few additional appearances from originally scheduled support act Common. The Touch the Sky Tour received positive reviews from critics, who generally praised West's performances. Some appreciated the guest performers, while other reviewers complimented the stage lighting. After 46 dates, the tour had reportedly grossed US$8 million. In February 2006, two people were shot at the last concert date in the UK, causing West to cancel a performance in Milan.

== Background ==
On September 14, 2005, West's record label Def Jam announced dates across North America for the first leg of the Touch the Sky Tour, titled after his song from Late Registration (2005). The tour dates ran from October to December 2005 and West was set to be supported by fellow rapper Common, American Idol winner Fantasia, and singer Keyshia Cole, who previously sang for the rapper's 2005 sets with R&B singer Usher. It marked West's second tour, though stood as his first major headlining one, with him playing large venues across the United States. The tour was sponsored by Verizon. Hours before the first concert was set to take place, Common canceled his involvement because of a demanding schedule for his role in a film with Taraji P. Henson. West was shooting a music video in New York for "Heard 'Em Say" the night before the kickoff show at the University of Miami Convocation Center in Miami on October 11, 2005, and also had a lack of rehearsal time. He went against the notion that the first show would pose a challenge: "Fuck that! We not gonna wait for 10 shows from now, we gonna touch the sky tonight." Common ultimately appeared to perform with West at the concert, declaring that he "couldn't miss Miami" and had "gotta see if Miami is ready to go", though he had officially pulled out of the tour and was only set to support shows when his schedule allowed it.

On December 3, 2005, West asked fellow rapper Lupe Fiasco to replace Common as a support act, which he accepted. Five dates across the United Kingdom in February 2006 for the tour's second leg were announced by West on December 1, after he had previously said he would play a one-off concert at Theatre Royal Drury Lane, London in February. Tickets for the dates were made available a day after the announcement and on December 16, West extended his stop at London's Hammersmith Apollo from one concert to three due to demand. In March 2006, it was confirmed by tour promoter Michael Coppel that West would be playing five dates in Australia that month, with the rapper later adding a concert at the Sydney Opera House in Sydney after a "special request". West came third in a survey of who University of North Carolina Wilmington students wanted to perform on campus, but he was the only available act from the top three. This led to an additional tour date there on April 22, 2006, with the university paying him over US$100,000 to appear.

== Inspiration and development ==
After sometimes being vocal about his detractors, West made a statement in September 2005 about his motives for the Touch the Sky Tour, saying things have "never been about the critics or the album sales", rather than "about the fans". He said that he loves being able "to bring this music — that I've poured my heart and soul into — to them", recalling considering how audiences will respond to hooks, intros, and specific lines when working on his music. West concluded, "Bringing these songs to the stage is the ultimate fulfillment of the creative process." The rapper subsequently declared his love of performing, appreciating the feeling of his songs playing, "getting the opportunity to hear them really loud and see what's connecting with people the most". West told an MTV reporter that making "the world better" is one of the missions with the music and visuals, calling his pain "everybody else's pleasure—how I stress, how I was up all last night, how I'm about to kill myself because it's not perfect. Well, maybe people can feel that when they're in the audience, like, 'Yoooooo! [...] He really put a lot of work in this.'" He also declared that those who have gone backstage "or seen a lot of shows" are "gonna give this show credit for being so different", while saying he was not captured by any television as a child. West explained that he has a "really high bar and low tolerance", admitting his small gauge of good content made him become the artist he is and finalizing, "Basically, I think 99 percent of the shit is wack. I don't want to be in that 99 percent."

West fired his first stage designer for the tour two weeks before the first show in Miami, yelling at him over the phone, "The visual...I'm not excited about going on tour. All y'all have is moving lights!" Despite English artist Es Devlin's lack of experience in staging popular music concerts, West recruited her as a production adviser to revamp the stage design. The collaboration came about after West's colleague Richard Brown recommended him to work with Devlin, who studied the rapper's previous work and was impressed that he could not speak after his mouth was wired shut due to the near-fatal car accident that created "Through the Wire" (2002). Devlin presented West with a few sketches of her ideas, which he disliked and saw as inferior to the content on her website; eventually, they started over because only 10 days remained until the tour. West was intent on the set featuring nature, requesting trees, rocks, and volcanoes, yet the artist struggled to work with replica natural displays. He had first discovered Devlin's work earlier in 2005, viewing images of the installation she created with the Chapman Brothers for English band Wire. After the Touch the Sky Tour, Devlin remained as West's stage designer, designing all of his succeeding tours, as of 2016. It was reported by The New Yorker after visiting Devlin in the summer of 2015 that she kept a backstage pass for the tour in her studio.

== Concert synopsis ==
On the Touch the Sky Tour, West was accompanied by a six-piece all-female string section on a platform and Canadian DJ A-Trak. The rapper wore six different costume pieces for the tour, such as an outfit consisting of a light-colored shirt and pants, a suit jacket, and white-framed sunglasses at the kickoff show in Miami. Prior to the concerts, the lights dimmed and a video reenactment of a Late Registration comedy skit appeared on the screen. Negative reviews of West's music and personality were projected onto a scrolling screen behind him as he performed, including when he collapsed during a performance of "Bring Me Down" at New York City's Madison Square Garden. One of the reviews started with, "The second release by the most obnoxious, egotistical, self-centered hip hop artist in the history of obnoxious..." Also behind the stage, live footage was projected of the concerts. Lighting backed West on stage, such as four large translucent light boxes, featuring his band that included his DJ and an orchestra led by a violinist. At certain points, white flood lights shone over the audience. When performing "Roses", West would often kneel down onstage.

== Reception ==
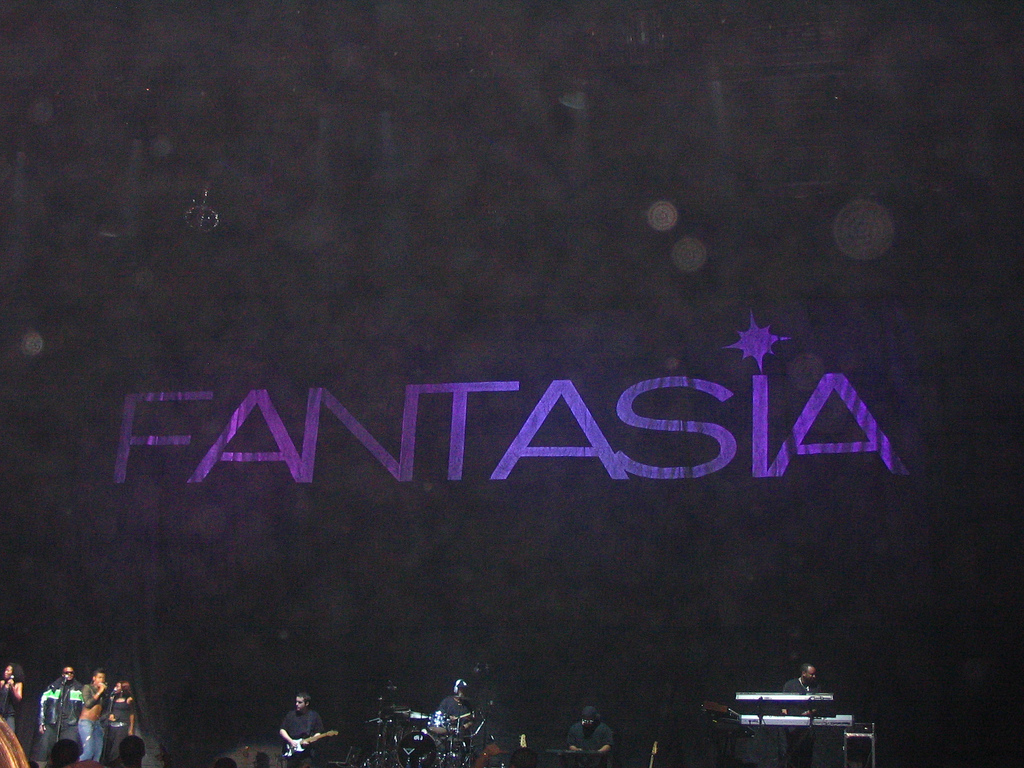
Numerous critics praised Fantasia's presence on the tour.

The Touch the Sky Tour was met with positive reviews from critics. The staff of The Oklahoman highlighted Fantasia's "same soulful delivery" that made her "an instant favorite" with American Idol viewers and also commended Cole's appearances during the concerts. Reviewing the Miami kickoff show, MTV writer Shaheem Reid was impressed by West's outfit that made it look like he had "stepped directly out of a photo shoot" and heavily appreciated his ability to captivate the audience. Reid also praised Common's appearance, the lack of audio problems, West's song choices, and the vocal performances from Cole and Fantasia. Nathan Brackett from Rolling Stone applauded West's ability to work the crowd at the concert in Madison Square Garden and commented that "he may be only an average rapper and a spazzy dancer", but he seemingly tried harder than many other acts via actions such as going through four different outfits and "employ[ing] a six-person string section". Brackett focused praise on West's stage acting and the atmosphere created by him performing hit singles, though was uninterested in the performances of some songs. After attending the tour stop at East Lansing's Michigan State University Breslin Center, Chicago music writer Tre G described it as "greatest thing [he] had ever seen at the time", feeling impressed by the lighting and visuals, saying it was clear West had consistently been "all about production". He gladly remembered a part of the show when West "displayed on the screen what critics and magazines were saying about him at the time", and was satisfied with his performance. Jason Allen provided a review of the show at San Jose's HP Pavilion for IGN, appreciating Lupe Fiasco's presence and Cole's passionate vocals that he compared to Mary J. Blige. Allen was taken aback by Fantasia's visual appearance and high energy, while he lauded the stage design's lighting and West's performance, being impressed after having once doubted him.

In a 2016 retrospective piece, the staff of Pigeons & Planes noted the Touch the Sky Tour's "glamorous six-piece string section". After its first 46 dates, the tour was reported to have grossed $8 million.

=== Controversy ===
During the tour's last stop in the UK at the NEC Arena in Solihull on February 28, 2006, two security guards were shot while people tried to enter without tickets. West Midlands Police were called to the site slightly after 10p.m. (GMT), reaffirming it "involved individuals who had been ejected" due to attempting to enter with no tickets. Following the incident, West's performance in Milan two days after the concert was canceled.

== Set list ==
The respective set lists given below for West and Cole are representative of the first show on October 11, 2005, in Miami, per MTV. This does not represent all concerts for the duration of the tour. West often performed "Roses" during his concerts, as well as "Diamonds from Sierra Leone". In his 2015 book God & Monster, journalist Mark Beaumont recalls West as having performed a 20-song set throughout the tour. During the sets, he would occasionally perform the Beatles' "Eleanor Rigby" (1966) or Twista's "Overnight Celebrity" (2004).

Kanye West set (Note: West was joined on stage by GLC and Consequence for "Late", "Drive Slow", and "Spaceship".)

1. "Touch the Sky"
2. "Late"
3. "Drive Slow"
4. "Spaceship"
5. "Get 'Em High" (performed with Common)
6. "Go!" (performed with Common)
7. "All Falls Down"
8. "Through the Wire"
9. "Gold Digger"
10. "Jesus Walks"
11. "We Major"

Keyshia Cole set

1. "I Changed My Mind"
2. "I Should Have Cheated"

== Shows ==
List of concerts in North America (Note: The final concert at the University of North Carolina Wilmington on April 22, 2006, is not listed because it came after the North American leg.)
Date (2005)	Location	Country	Venue
October 11	Miami	United States	University of Miami Convocation Center
October 12	Tampa	United States	USF Sundome
October 13	Gainesville	United States	University of Florida O'Connell Center
October 15	Greenville	United States	BI-LO Center
October 16	Knoxville	United States	Thompson–Boling Arena
October 18	Columbia	United States	Mizzou Arena
October 19	Champaign	United States	Assembly Hall
October 21	Buffalo	United States	Alumni Arena
October 22	Detroit	United States	Fox Theatre
October 23	Detroit	United States	Fox Theatre
October 23	Columbus	United States	Schottenstein Center
October 26	Kingston	United States	University of Rhode Island Ryan Center
October 28	University Park	United States	Bryce Jordan Center
October 29	Cleveland	United States	CSU Convocation Center
October 30	Fairfax	United States	Patriot Center
October 31	Amherst	United States	Mullins Center
November 2	New York City	United States	Madison Square Garden
November 3	New York City	United States	Madison Square Garden
November 4	Baltimore	United States	1st Mariner Arena
November 5	Hampton	United States	Hampton Coliseum
November 6	Philadelphia	United States	Liacouras Center
November 8	Pittsburgh	United States	AJ Palumbo Center
November 9	Toronto	Canada	Air Canada Centre
November 11	East Lansing	United States	Michigan State University Breslin Center
November 12	Chicago	United States	Rosemont Theatre
November 13	DeKalb	United States	NIU Convocation Center
November 14	Evanston	United States	Welsh–Ryan Arena
November 15	Carbondale	United States	SIU Arena
November 17	Atlanta	United States	Gwinnett Center
November 18	Greensboro	United States	Greensboro Coliseum
November 19	Statesboro	United States	Georgia Southern University
November 20	Birmingham	United States	Birmingham–Jefferson Convention Center
November 22	Oklahoma City	United States	Ford Center
November 23	Memphis	United States	Mid-South Coliseum
November 25	Houston	United States	Reliant Arena
November 26	Grand Prairie	United States	Nokia Live
November 27	Kansas City	United States	Kemper Arena
November 29	Denver	United States	Magness Arena or Colorado Convention Center Lecture Hall
December 1	Phoenix	United States	Dodge Theatre
December 2	San Diego	United States	Cox Arena or USCD RIMAC Arena
December 3	Universal City	United States	Gibson Amphitheatre
December 4	Universal City	United States	Gibson Amphitheatre
December 6	San Francisco	United States	Bill Graham Civic Auditorium
December 7	Las Vegas	United States	Mandalay Bay or Aladdin
December 7	San Jose	United States	HP Pavilion
December 9	Portland	United States	Memorial Coliseum
December 10	Everett	United States	Everett Center
December 11	Vancouver	Canada	GM Place

List of concerts in the United Kingdom
Date (2006)	Location	Country	Venue
February 16	Manchester	England	MEN Arena
February 17	Glasgow	Scotland	SECC Arena
February 19	London	England	Hammersmith Apollo
February 20	London	England	Hammersmith Apollo
February 21	London	England	Hammersmith Apollo
February 22	Cardiff	Wales	Cardiff Arena
February 28	Solihull	England	NEC Arena

List of concerts in Japan
Date (2006)	Location	Country	Venue
April 4	Yokohama	Japan	Yokohama Blitz
April 5	Shin-Kiba	Japan	Studio Coast
