= Two Words =

2004 song by Kanye West featuring Mos Def, Freeway and the Boys Choir of Harlem

Song by Kanye West featuring Mos Def, Freeway and the Boys Choir of Harlem

from the album The College Dropout
- B-side: "Through The Wire"
- Released: November 10, 2003
- Recorded: 2002
- Studio: Edie Road Recording Studio (Argyle, New York); Quad Recordings (New York, New York)
- Genre: Conscious hip-hop; hardcore hip-hop
- Length: 4:26
- Label: Roc-A-Fella; Def Jam
- Songwriters: Kanye West; Dante Smith; Leslie Pridgen; Lou Wilson; Ric Wilson; Carlos Wilson
- Producer: West

Music video
- "Two Words" on YouTube

"Two Words" is a song by American hip-hop artist Kanye West from West's debut studio album The College Dropout (2004). The song features verses from Mos Def (now known as Yasiin Bey), Freeway, and the Boys Choir of Harlem. It was originally released on the 14th of December, 2002, as "2 Words", on Kanye's debut mixtape, called Get Well Soon.... The song was later re-released on the 10th of November, 2003, as the B-side to the mixtape's (and later the album's) lead single, "Through the Wire". A "cinematic" version of the song was released as part of The College Dropout Video Anthology, alongside a music video for the song, on the 22nd of March, 2005. It has been performed by Freeway regularly at his live shows over the years.

== Background ==
The original version of the track list for The College Dropout showed that the song was initially scheduled to be titled "2 Words" and have the position of number 5, rather than number 18 as it stands on the official release. Featured artist Freeway stated that Kanye wasn't initially respected as a rapper, but after seeing West's talent, when asked to feature on the album, Freeway's response was: "Hell yeah. Let’s do it."

== Composition and lyrics ==
Within "Two Words", there is an orchestral sound that includes classical strings. Miri Ben-Ari revealed that she was the one who introduced West to this sound, which led to him falling in love with it. The track contains a sample of 1970 recording "Peace and Love (Amani Na Mapenzi) Movement III (Time)", written by Lou Wilson, Ric Wilson and Carlos Wilson, and performed by Mandrill. On top of this, it samples drums from The 5th Dimension's 1971 track "The Rainmaker".

West references a group he was once in known as the Go Getters with the line: "Go Getters rhyme like, should've been signed twice" and over the years, West has actually recycled multiple rhymes that he first spit when part of the group.

== Recording ==
Miri Ben-Ari revealed that "Two Words" was the first recording she ever did with West. It was revealed by West that he drove to the Harlem Boys Choir's summer camp to record them in a barn for the track. West actually had to pay them $10,000 to record a feature for him. Freeway liked the beat when he heard it, which made him: "want to go ham on it" and the rapper laid his verse down for the song before West and Mos recorded their parts.

== In popular culture ==
An alternative version titled "Two Words (Frisky Remix)" was shared to BBC Music, which is a mashup of the original and Tinie Tempah's Labrinth-featuring single "Frisky", but only Kanye West, Labrinth and Mos Def are included as artists in the remix. On February 27, 2014, Ace Hood released a freestyle titled "Lyrical Exercise" over the instrumental of "Two Words".

== Critical reception ==
Eric Tullis of SPIN described the track as being "the perfect playground for [the three rappers] to break character and address the American reality". It was pointed out by Paul Cantor of Billboard as what is "perhaps the symphonic high point of the record". It received a nomination for Best Hip-Hop Deep Cut at the 2005 Groovevolt Music and Fashion Awards.

== Live performances ==
West and Mos performed "Two Words" live with the Roots as a backing band on September 18, 2004, as part of Dave Chappelle's Block Party concert. Freeway has performed the song at his live shows for years and said himself that: "Everyone loves it." On one occasion, Freeway joined West for a performance of it at a Super Bowl party with Pepsi, which was at the time of Super Bowl XL in February 2006.

== Music video ==
Despite the song not being one of the album's singles, a music video was officially released for it as part of West's The College Dropout Video Anthology on March 22, 2005. He released an edited version of the video independently on November 4.

All of the people who starred in the music video shot their parts in different places. This didn't mark the only time a video was released for a non-single from West's debut album, since he also shot one for "Spaceship", which was posted online by featured artist GLC on June 1, 2009 - however, it was originally scheduled to be released as a single, unlike "Two Words".

== Track listing ==
CD single

1. "Through the Wire"
2. "Through the Wire" (instrumental)
3. "Two Words" (main)
4. "Two Words" (clean)
5. "Two Words" (instrumental)

UK CD single

1. "Through the Wire" (radio edit)
2. "Two Words" (radio edit)
3. "Through the Wire" (instrumental)
4. "Through the Wire" (multimedia track)

== Personnel ==
Information taken from The College Dropout liner notes.

- Songwriters: Kanye West, Dante Smith, Leslie Pridgen, Lou Wilson, Ric Wilson, Carlos Wilson
- Record producer: Kanye West
- Recorders: Marc Fuller, Keith Slattery, Carlisle Young
- Mix engineer: Mike Dean
- Additional vocals: The Boys Choir of Harlem
- Keyboards: Keith Slattery
- Violin: Miri Ben-Ari

== Certifications ==
Certifications for "Two Words"
Region	Certification	Certified units/sales
United States (RIAA)	Gold	500,000^{‡}
^{‡} Sales+streaming figures based on certification alone.

== Cinematic version ==
"Two Words (Cinematic)"

Song by Kanye West featuring the Boys Choir of Harlem
- Released: March 22, 2005
- Recorded: 2004
- Genre: Hip hop
- Length: 4:04
- Label: Roc-A-Fella; Def Jam
- Songwriters: Kanye West; Dante Smith; Lou Wilson; Ric Wilson; Carlos Wilson
- Producer: West

On March 22, 2005, The College Dropout Video Anthology was released, which features a bonus audio CD with a cinematic version of "Two Words" as a track on it.
