= The College Dropout Video Anthology =

Video by Kanye West
- Released: March 22, 2005
- Recorded: 2004
- Genre: Hip hop
- Labels: Roc-A-Fella; Def Jam
- Producers: Kanye West; Lil Jon

Kanye West chronology
The College Dropout (2004)	The College Dropout Video Anthology (2005)	Late Registration (2005)

The College Dropout Video Anthology is a DVD release featuring the music videos to the singles from American rapper Kanye West's debut studio album The College Dropout (2004), released on March 22, 2005. It featured the videos to the previously unreleased "Two Words", "Slow Jamz", "Through the Wire", "All Falls Down", the three versions of "Jesus Walks", and "The New Workout Plan".

Kanye West has said on many occasions that he feels the imagery of his music videos are very important to him and an integral part to his art. He contributed to the direction of the videos for "All Falls Down" and all three versions of "Jesus Walks".

The initial music video for "Jesus Walks" was rejected by MTV and other networks for being inappropriate for airing, so West made an alternate version for MTV. A third video was also made, although rarely seen before this DVD.

The College Dropout Video Anthology was accompanied by a bonus audio CD that featured seven otherwise unreleased songs by Kanye West. Three are remixes or reprises of songs from The College Dropout, two are alternate instrumental versions of Dropout tracks, and two ("It's Alright" and "Heavy Hitters") were previously unreleased originals.

On June 12, 2006, the DVD/CD set was certified Gold by the Recording Industry Association of America (RIAA) once the album surpassed the 50,000 units sold.

== Critical reception ==
Professional ratings
Review scores
Source	Rating
AllMusic	3/5 stars

David Jeffries of AllMusic felt that although "bonus feature-filled DVD would be most desirable, Kanye West's videos are compelling enough on their own to make a bare-bones collection of them worthy." He praised the videos featured on the DVD, with particular praise for the inclusion of the full eight minute cut of "The New Workout Plan", which Jeffries called "a treat". Although the "Making Of" section of the DVD was "just as mediocre and throwaway as you'd expect", he noted that the fact they contained editing was a "big surprise" compared to other compilations. Jeffries complained that the presence of multiple corporate logos in the music videos caused "more blurry mosaics than Japanese porno", as well as all videos featuring censored lyrics.

== Chapter Listing ==
DVD
No.	Title	Director(s)	Length
1.	"Through the Wire"	West; Coodie & Chike	4:54
2.	"Slow Jamz" (performed by Twista featuring Kanye West & Jamie Foxx)	Fat Cats; West	3:34
3.	"All Falls Down" (featuring Syleena Johnson)	Chris Milk; West	4:05
4.	"Two Words" (featuring Mos Def, Freeway & The Boys Choir of Harlem)	West; Coodie & Chike	4:43
5.	"Jesus Walks" (Church version)	Michael Haussman	4:04
6.	"Jesus Walks" (Chris Milk version)	Milk	4:06
7.	"Jesus Walks" (Street version)	West; Coodie & Chike	4:18
8.	"Jesus Walks" (Making of the video)		66:56
9.	"The New Workout Plan" (Extended version featuring Fonzworth Bentley)	Little X; West	8:06
Total length:			104:46

Bonus CD (All tracks produced by Kanye West except "The New Workout Plan (Remix)" (produced by Lil Jon)
No.	Title	Length
1.	"We Don't Care (Reprise)" (featuring Keyshia Cole)	2:57
2.	"Jesus Walks (Remix)" (featuring Mase & Common)	4:58
3.	"It's Alright" (featuring Mase & John Legend)	3:51
4.	"The New Workout Plan (Remix)" (featuring Fonzworth Bentley, Luke & Twista)	4:02
5.	"Heavy Hitters" (featuring GLC)	3:56
6.	"Two Words (Cinematic)" (featuring The Boys Choir of Harlem)	4:06
7.	"Never Let Me Down (Cinematic)"	5:16
Total length:		29:03

== Sample credits ==
- "We Don't Care" contains samples from "I Just Wanna Stop" performed by The Jimmy Castor Bunch.
- "Jesus Walks" (Remix) contains a sample of "Walk With Me" performed by The Arc Choir.
- "Two Words" contains a sample of "Peace And Love (Amani Na Mapenzi) - Movement IV (Encounter)" performed by Mandrill.
- "Never Let Me Down" contains an interpolation of "Maybe It's The Power Of Love", written by Michael Bolton and Bruce Kulick

== Certifications ==
Region	Certification	Certified units/sales
United States (RIAA)	Gold	50,000^{^}
^{^} Shipments figures based on certification alone.
