= Never Let Me Down (Kanye West song) =

2004 Kanye West song

Song by Kanye West featuring Jay-Z and J. Ivy

from the album The College Dropout
- Released: February 10, 2004
- Recorded: May 2002 – 2003
- Studio: Baseline Recording (New York, New York); The Record Plant (Hollywood, California); Larrabee Sound North (Los Angeles, California)
- Genre: Hip-hop
- Length: 5:24
- Label: Def Jam; Roc-A-Fella
- Songwriters: Kanye West; Shawn Carter; James Richardson; Michael Bolton; Bruce Kulick
- Producer: West

"Never Let Me Down" is a song by American rapper and producer Kanye West, released as the eighth track from his debut studio album The College Dropout (2004). It features guest appearances from two rappers: West's Roc-A-Fella Records label boss and the album's executive producer, Jay-Z, as well as fellow Chicago-based spoken word artist J. Ivy. Its production was handled solely by West, and samples "Maybe It's the Power of Love" by American rock group Blackjack. As such, Blackjack members Michael Bolton and Bruce Kulick have writing credits on the song. West and Ivy each provide one verse – the latter's being a poem – while Jay-Z has two verses.

Music critics mostly had praise for the track, released with the rest of its album on February 10, 2004, but tended to view Jay's appearance in a negative light. Although the song was not released as a single and, thus, did not chart, it was certified gold on April 21, 2022. Previously, in 2011, Billboard listed the song as the second greatest collaboration between Kanye and Jay. Although an accompanying music video was never produced for "Never Let Me Down", the audio of the track was used in one of West's videos for fellow College Dropout track "Jesus Walks". The song has developed a significant legacy over time, despite never having an official single release.

== Background ==
Ivy revealed that he initially knew West from Chicago, but was reintroduced to him in New Jersey shortly before they collaborated on the track. He got a call from Coodie at 11 pm on December 7, 2002, about being part of the song, in which Coodie said to him: "J, you need to get to L.A. Kanye got this song with him and Jay Z and he wants to put a poet on it. I told him he had to put J. Ivy on it." and Ivy initially said, "Stop bullshitting", before Coodie played it for him over the phone from Record Plant in Hollywood, California. At the time, Ivy was excited about being on the record, not only because of: 'knowing that [West] was taking off to superstardom at the time', but also because he thought of Jay as "one of the greatest of all time". After penning his verse, Ivy called Coodie and rapped to him over the phone, then he put Ivy on speaker phone to rap his verse again once Coodie went in the other room with people in it and the people in there reacted positively to Ivy's verse – this led to him rapping it over, over, over and over again to them.

== Recording ==
On February 13, 2014, a video surfaced online from 2003 of West rapping his verse to Pharrell in the studio, as well as singing along with the sample and Pharrell clearly showed excitement after hearing the rap from him. The verse was actually recorded by West on the night of the Madison Square Garden show by Jay that he wasn't invited to. Ivy rapped his verse on speaker phone to West and others on December 7, 2002, then flew over to Hollywood to join them in recording via West's request. It was revealed by Tarry Torae that West set up a little studio section in his living room during the recording of "Never Let Me Down" and Torae ended up recording two or three songs in the night of this session, one of which was "My Way" which ended up on the infamous unofficial Kanye West mixtape Freshmen Adjustment (2004). When it comes to Jay's appearance on the track, John Monopoly revealed that he recorded for it two days before mastering of the featuring album – however, Jay had confirmed to give West a feature before it was even known which track he'd be part of.

== Composition ==
=== Lyrics ===
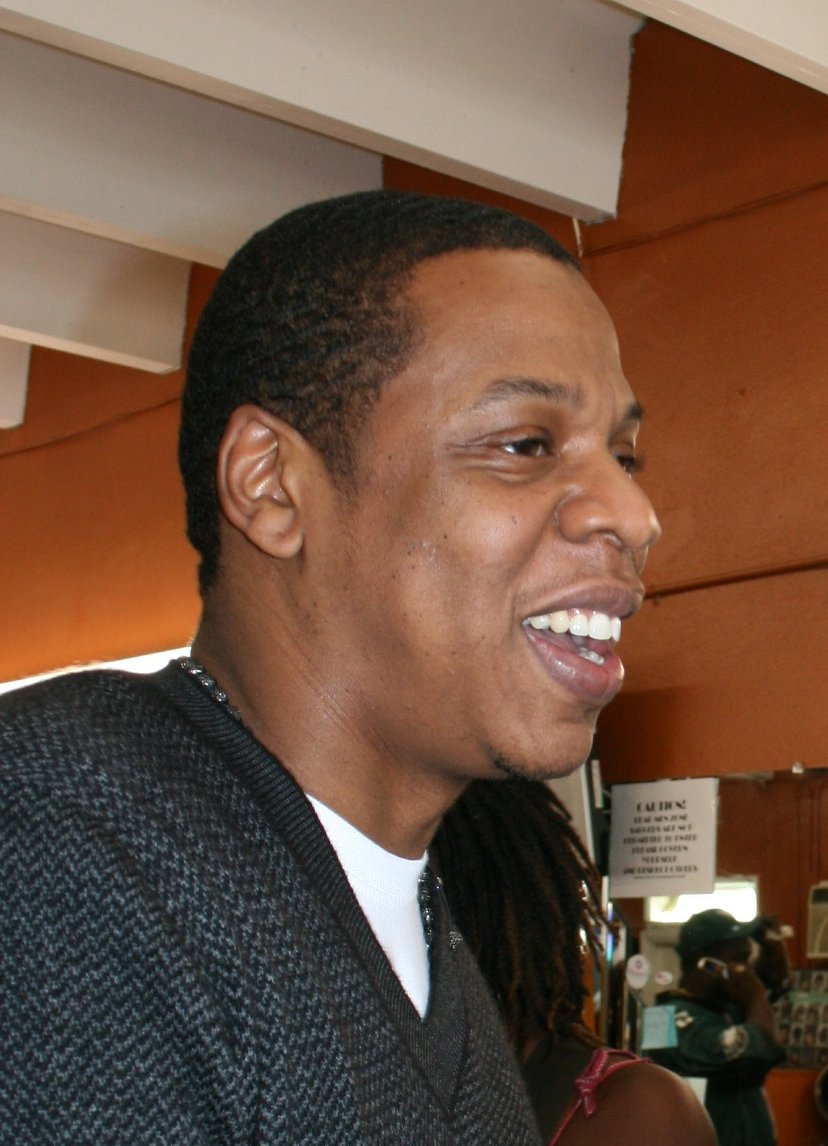
Jay-Z has two verses on "Never Let Me Down"

The two verses by Jay-Z were originally recorded for his seventh studio album, The Blueprint^{2}: The Gift & The Curse in mid 2002. After deciding to not use the song, West decided to finish it for his album. Ivy's verse is a poem that he wrote in a notebook, which Ivy claimed was something that he turned to God and prayed for. The lines rapped in West's verse: "Nothing sad as that day my girl's father passed away/So I promised to Mr. Rainey I'm gonna marry your daughter" mark a promise that he didn't keep, since the rapper went on to marry Kim Kardashian in 2014 rather than Sumeke Rainey. Within the verse, West raps the line: "Racism's still alive, they just be concealin' it", which went on to be one of his most quoted lyrics. The 2002 car accident involving West is referenced by him with the line: "I know I got angels watching me from the other side", which is a subject he mostly touches on in debut single "Through the Wire".

=== Sample ===
Within the track, American band Blackjack's 1980 song "Maybe It's the Power of Love" is sampled. In February 2015, band member Michael Bolton recalled clearing the sample at the time, revealing that he required the artists to send him the lyrics first to see if the content was worthy of his approval – in the end, Bolton believed that "the song turned out beautifully" and he's "totally happy with it". Bolton actually took to the online site Genius and annotated the song. However, it was also revealed by Bolton that he didn't know who Kanye and Jay were when he first found out that they were trying to license "Maybe It's the Power of Love", until his daughters told him: "They're like the biggest rappers in the business, dad." – Bolton himself even admitted to being out of touch during this time.

== Release ==
On the original track list of The College Dropout, "Never Let Me Down" was number fourteen, instead of number eight as it stands on the official release. When the album was released, West referenced featuring artist Jay-Z in the booklet's list of "Thanx" by crediting "Jay 4 blowin me up". Despite a music video never being released, part of the song is played during the ending of the second version of three videos for West's 2004 single "Jesus Walks", which comes one position before it on the album's track list. Ivy performed a poetry style rendition of his verse for the Season 5 opener of Russell Simmons presents HBO Def Poetry in 2006, which was only performed live and never part of any release by the rapper. The verse being performed by Ivy for this opener was appropriate, since he considers it to be a poem.

== Reception ==
=== Critical response ===
"Never Let Me Down" received positive reviews from the majority of music critics, though most tended to have praise for West's work and express negativity towards Jay's contributions. Paul Cantor of Billboard had mixed views towards the song, describing Jay's presence as being where he "phones in a verse about making number one albums", but praising the rest of it for being "about overcoming racism and undefeatable odds". Rob Mitchum of Pitchfork felt negatively about Jay's contributions too, labelling his appearance as him "already sounding groggy from retirement". Jay's content was viewed as paling in comparison to that of West by Dave Heaton of PopMatters, since he described the song as "where Jay-Z rhymes about attaining status and power, Kanye one-ups him with a show-stopping attack on racism and meditation on death". The staff of HipHopDX actually put Jay forward as being better than West on the song but didn't lack praise for either rapper, writing that "Jay-Z drops 2 incredible verses on [Never Let Me Down] with Kanye not far behind delivering the verse of his career." It was viewed by Sal Cinquemani of Slant Magazine as being one of the album tracks where West "proves he can flow with the best of them".

=== Accolades ===
HotNewHipHop placed it at number 48 on their list of West's 50 best songs. On Complex's list of his 100 best songs, the track was ranked at number 82. "Never Let Me Down" was listed by Billboard as being the second greatest Jay and Kanye collaboration in August 2011, post-release of their collaborative album Watch the Throne. Time named it the second best song of 2004.

== Legacy ==
A video of West rapping "Never Let Me Down" to Pharrell from 2003 surfaced online within the same week as the tenth anniversary of The College Dropout and it was regarded as a classic track by this point. Ivy's appearance on it has been regarded as one of the most significant moments of his career. West's lyrics: "I get down for my grandfather/Who took my mama/Made her sit in that seat where white folks didn't want us to eat/At the tender age of six, she was arrested for the sit-ins/And with that in my blood, I was born to be different" were viewed by Spin in 2014 as showing "heavenly inspiration and scrappy determination", which was claimed for West to still be showing nine years later in his 2013 track "I Am a God". When Ben Westhoff of The Guardian published an article in April 2015 that ranked the album at number one in West's discography, the song was the end of what he called "as powerful a sequence as I've ever heard on record". Ivy blogged in celebration of The College Dropout's 13th anniversary on February 10, 2017, and shared the original page with his lyrics scribbled down, alongside various notes.

== Personnel ==
Information taken from The College Dropout liner notes.

- Songwriters: Kanye West, Shawn Carter, James Richardson, Michael Bolton, Bruce Kulick
- Record producer: Kanye West
- Recorders: Gimel "Guru" Keaton, Anthony Kilhoffer, Brent Kolanto, Jacelyn Parry, Rabeka Tunei
- Mix engineer: Manny Marroquin
- Keyboards: Ervin "EP" Pope
- Guitars: Glen Jefferey

== Certifications ==
Certifications for "Never Let Me Down"
Region	Certification	Certified units/sales
United States (RIAA)	Gold	500,000^{‡}
^{‡} Sales+streaming figures based on certification alone.

== Cinematic version ==
"Never Let Me Down (Cinematic)"

Song by Kanye West

from the album The College Dropout Video Anthology
- Released: March 22, 2005
- Recorded: 2004
- Genre: Hip-hop
- Length: 5:15
- Label: Roc-A-Fella; Def Jam
- Songwriters: Kanye West; James Richardson; Michael Bolton; Bruce Kulick
- Producer: West

On the 22nd of March, 2005, The College Dropout Video Anthology was released, which features a bonus audio CD with a "cinematic" version of "Never Let Me Down" as a track on its bonus CD, alongside the bonus CD of the 2005 Japanese special edition. The version is mostly an instrumental, excluding all verses, specifically Jay-Z, who does not have a writing credit on this version. The only vocals kept were the chorus.
