= Chipmunk soul =

Style of hip hop music production

Chipmunk soul is a style of hip hop that features sped-up vocal samples, originating in the 2000s. The genre was popularized by Kanye West in his albums The College Dropout, Late Registration and Graduation, which notably were heavy in high-pitched vocals, especially in the songs "Spaceship" and "Through the Wire". Early users of the style included Just Blaze, RZA, DJ Premier and Common.

The name "chipmunk" is a reference to Alvin and the Chipmunks, a 1960s musical act featuring sped-up high-pitched vocal recordings.

Although the style originated by sampling soul music recordings, the term "chipmunk soul" includes the use of samples from other musical genres including reggae, rock and world music.
