= College Dropout (restaurant) =

Australian burger chain

Coordinates: 37.7694°S 145.0413°E

- Interactive map of College Dropout

Restaurant information
- Established: June 27, 2021
- Owner: Mark Elkhouri
- Location: 91 Upper Heidelberg Rd, Ivanhoe VIC 3079; 482 Albion St, Brunswick West VIC 3055
- Website: collegedropoutburgers.com

College Dropout is a burger chain in Melbourne, Australia. They are known, in-part, for having made international headlines after being unsuccessfully sued by the American musician Kanye West for intellectual property infringement.

The chain is named after West's album The College Dropout, which they did not get his permission or endorsement to use. The restaurant uses the Dropout Bear as a mascot, and has items named for other things in West's career, such as his album and song titles. For a brief period, they sold burgers named after celebrities that dropped out of college as a result of West's lawsuit. As of 2025, they have returned to branding styled around West.

== Description ==
The restaurant debuted on June 27, 2021 in Ivanhoe, Victoria. It later opened a location on the CBD campus of RMIT University. It was opened by Mark Elkhouri, also responsible for the Melbourne dessert chain Nuts About Tella.

The burger restaurant is heavily styled based on the music career of Kanye West. Menu items at the restaurant are named for things associated with West, such as songs, albums, or lyrics. Examples included the Graduation which was essentially a classic smashed beef burger, the "Gold Digger", which was a fried chicken burger, and a breakfast burger named the "Good Morning".

The aesthetics of the restaurant also borrowed heavily from West's intellectual property. Signage of the Ivanhoe location included images resembling Dropout Bear, West's mascot. None of the restaurant's reliance upon West's intellectual property occurred with his permission or endorsement.

== Dispute with Kanye West ==
In 2022, the restaurant made international headlines after it was sued by Kanye West. Reportedly, the rapper followed the restaurant through its stories on Instagram, which the restaurant owner mistook as West's approval for the restaurant. Later, West contacted the owner and sued the restaurant. The restaurant changed its logo and the names of its burgers after being contacted by West, but continued to trade under the same name.

The basis of the lawsuit was that Elkhouri had engaged in misleading and deceptive conduct by falsely associating himself with West and his brand. (Note: 'Personality rights' do not exist as a form of intellectual property in Australia. Celebrities therefore need to rely upon 'misleading and deceptive conduct' as a basis for protecting their image and likeness) During the lawsuit, the names of the burgers were renamed to celebrities that had dropped out of college. Examples include the "Zucker burg", and other burgers named for Bill Gates, Brad Pitt, and Steve Jobs.

In 2023, the case was dismissed by Justice Shaun McElwaine due to West and his lawyers failing to comply with Australian Federal Court rules of procedure. The restaurant was represented by Craig Smith SC. The restaurant celebrated the dismissal by handing out free burgers from 2pm to 3pm on March 4, 2023.

In April, Elkhouri flew to the US to pursue West for legal damages.

As of 2025, College Dropout has returned to selling items named after West, with items such as the "Gorgeous" and "Famous" burgers (the latter self-described as their take on the Big Mac) being available. Their current logo, like their original branding, is heavily based on West's Dropout Bear character.

== See also ==
- Personality rights
