= Dropout Bear =

Mascot and fictional character by Kanye West

- Dropout Bear from Graduation
- First appearance: "Through the Wire"; September 30, 2003
- Last appearance: "Kids See Ghosts Animated Show preview"; June 26, 2020
- Adapted by: Takashi Murakami
- Designed by: Sam Hansen
- Portrayed by: Kanye West

The Dropout Bear (also referred to as the Kanye Bear, Late Registration Bear, or Graduation Bear) is an anthropomorphic symbol, character, and mascot for American rapper Kanye West. The bear was originally designed by graphic designer Sam Hansen and was used in the album cover art, promotion, and music videos for West's first three studio albums, The College Dropout (2004), Late Registration (2005), and Graduation (2007).

== Background ==
The Dropout Bear was originally designed by graphic designer Sam Hansen. Its first commercial appearance came on the cover art for West's debut single "Through the Wire" in September 2003. The character would later appear on the cover art of West's debut studio album, The College Dropout, in February 2004. The album's cover was handled by art director Eric Duvauchelle of Roc-A-Fella Records, which depicts the Dropout Bear in a school gymnasium, wearing a suit coat, red T-shirt, and jeans. The Dropout Bear suit also made an appearance in the music video for West's "The New Workout Plan" in 2004.

== First redesign ==
The first redesign of the Dropout Bear came with the development of West's second album, Late Registration. Similar to the cover art of The College Dropout, the artwork on Late Registration features the mascot, showing it at a child's size and standing in the center of two large wooden doors at Princeton University. The mascot has googly eyes, perky ears, and a collegian outfit, wearing a blazer with a school insignia. In the album booklet, Dropout Bear appears in the university, sitting alone in classrooms and reading books before exiting. This design for the Dropout Bear on Late Registration was carried over onto the cover art for West's live album Late Orchestration in 2006.

== Second redesign ==
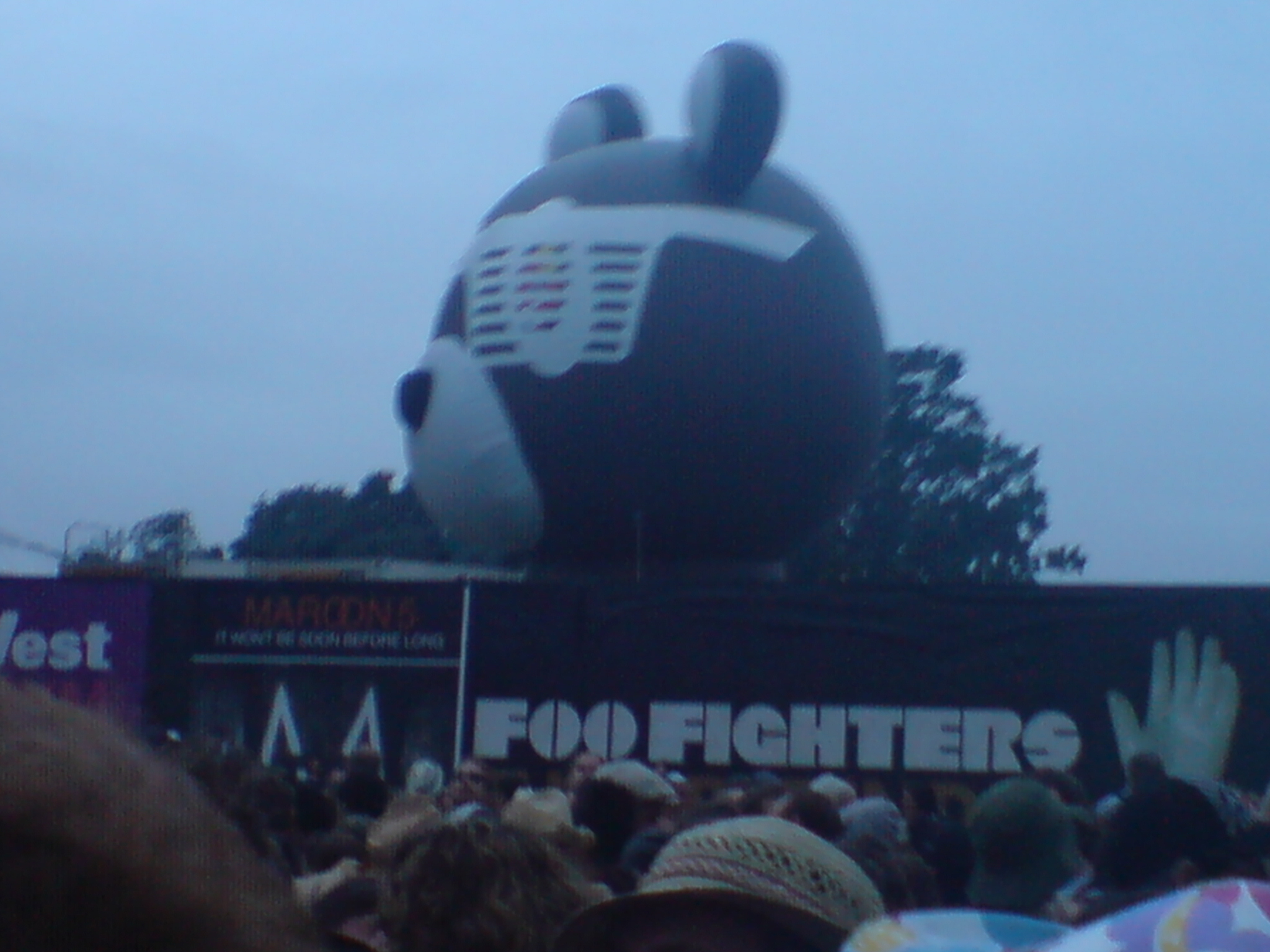
The Dropout Bear at V Festival in Essex, England

The second redesign of the Dropout Bear came with the development of West's third studio album, Graduation. West collaborated with Japanese contemporary artist Takashi Murakami to oversee the art direction of Graduation as well as design the cover art for the album's accompanying singles. Often called "the Warhol of Japan", Murakami's surrealistic visual art is characterized by cartoonish creatures that appear friendly and cheerful at first glance but possess dark, twisted undertones.

The album's artwork of the Dropout Bear expresses colorful, pastel imagery influenced by Murakami's affiliation with Superflat, a postmodern art movement influenced by manga and anime. Murakami later reproduced the artwork designs through the use of cel-shaded animation within a three-minute animated music video for the opening track, "Good Morning".

After collaborating with West on the artwork and video, Murakami later worked on the cover art for West and Kid Cudi's eponymous debut studio album, Kids See Ghosts (2018).

== Other appearances ==
After Graduation, a version of The Dropout Bear would be featured on the cover of Chief Keef's 2014 album Nobody. The title track featured Kanye West. This same version would be featured again on Chief Keef’s Nobody 2.

The Dropout Bear's most recent appearances came with the promotion and artwork for West's collaborative album Kids See Ghosts with Kid Cudi in 2018. Takashi Murakami had stated that West had brought forward the idea of portraying an anthropomorphized bear and fox to reflect him and Cudi, respectively. A trailer for a supposed Kids See Ghosts animated show was released on YouTube in June 2020, depicting the Dropout Bear and Kid Cudi's anthropomorphic fox.
