= The College Dropout =

- Original release cover; later remasters of the album feature a white background instead of brown.

Studio album by Kanye West
- Released: February 10, 2004
- Recorded: 1999–2003
- Studios: Baseline (New York City); Full Time Dreamer (New York City); Light @ the End of the Tunnel (New York City); Quad (New York City); Sony Music (New York City); Conway (Los Angeles); Larrabee Sound North (Los Angeles); Digital Insight (Las Vegas); Edie Road (Argyle); The Enterprise (Burbank); Record Plant (Hollywood)
- Genres: Hip-hop; chipmunk soul; pop rap; conscious rap; progressive rap
- Length: 76:13
- Labels: Roc-A-Fella; Def Jam
- Producer: Kanye West

Kanye West chronology
Kon the Louis Vuitton Don (2004)	The College Dropout (2004)	Late Registration (2005)

Singles from The College Dropout
- 1. "Through the Wire" Released: September 30, 2003; 2. "Slow Jamz" Released: December 2, 2003; 3. "All Falls Down" Released: March 8, 2004; 4. "Jesus Walks" Released: May 25, 2004; 5. "The New Workout Plan" Released: August 31, 2004

The College Dropout is the debut studio album by the American rapper Kanye West. It was released on February 10, 2004, by Roc-A-Fella Records and Def Jam Recordings. In the years leading up to its release, West had received praise for his production work for rappers such as Jay-Z and Talib Kweli, but he faced difficulty being accepted as an artist in his own right by figures in the music industry. Intent on pursuing a solo career, he signed a record deal with Roc-A-Fella and recorded the album over a period of four years, beginning in 1999.

The production of The College Dropout was primarily handled by West and showcased his "chipmunk soul" musical style, which made use of sped-up, pitch shifted vocal samples from soul and R&B records, in addition to West's own drum programming, string accompaniments, and gospel choirs; the album also features contributions from Jay-Z, Mos Def, Jamie Foxx, Syleena Johnson, and Ludacris, among others. Diverging from the then-dominant gangster persona in hip-hop, West's lyrics concern themes of family, self-consciousness, materialism, religion, racism, and higher education.

The College Dropout debuted at number two on the US Billboard 200, selling 441,000 copies in its first week of sales. It was a large-scale commercial success, with domestic sales of over 3.4 million copies by 2014 and was certified 6× platinum by the Recording Industry Association of America (RIAA) in 2026. The album was promoted with singles such as "Through the Wire", "Jesus Walks", "All Falls Down", and "Slow Jamz", the latter two of which peaked within the top ten of the Billboard Hot 100, with "Slow Jamz" becoming West's first number-one single as a lead artist.

A widespread critical success, The College Dropout was praised for West's production, humorous and emotional raps, and the music's balance of self-examination and mainstream sensibilities. The album earned the rapper several accolades, including nominations for Album of the Year and Best Rap Album at the 2005 Grammy Awards, winning for the latter. It has since been named by numerous publications as one of the greatest albums of all time, including Rolling Stone and NME, who ranked it at 74 and 273 respectively on their "500 Greatest Albums of All Time" lists, and is credited for popularizing the chipmunk soul and conscious rap subgenres in the 2000s.

== Background ==
In the mid-1990s, Kanye West began his early production career, making beats primarily for burgeoning local artists, and eventually developed a style that involved speeding up vocal samples from classic soul records. For a time, he acted as a ghost producer for Deric "D-Dot" Angelettie. Due to his association with D-Dot, West was unable to release a solo album, so he formed and became a member and producer of the Go-Getters, a late-1990s Chicago rap group composed of him, GLC, Timmy G, Really Doe, and Arrowstar. The group released their first and only studio album World Record Holders in 1999. West came to achieve recognition with his contributions to Jay-Z's influential 2001 album The Blueprint. The Blueprint has been named by Rolling Stone as the 50th greatest album of all time, and the critical and financial success of the album generated substantial interest in West as a producer. Serving as an in-house producer for Roc-A-Fella Records, West produced records for other artists from the label, including Beanie Sigel, Freeway, and Cam'ron. He also crafted hit songs for Ludacris, Alicia Keys, and Janet Jackson.

Although he had attained success as a producer, Kanye West aspired to be a rapper, but had struggled to attain a record deal. Record companies ignored him because he did not portray the gangsta image prominent in mainstream hip-hop at the time. After a series of meetings with Capitol Records, West was ultimately denied an artist deal. According to Capitol Records's A&R, Joe Weinberger, he was approached by West and almost signed a deal with him, but another person in the company convinced Capitol's president not to. Desperate to keep West from defecting to another label, then-label head Damon Dash reluctantly signed West to Roc-A-Fella Records. Jay-Z, West's colleague and one of his mentors, later admitted that Roc-A-Fella was initially reluctant to support West as a rapper, claiming that many saw him as a producer first and foremost, and that his background contrasted with that of his labelmates.

West's breakthrough came a year later on October 23, 2002, when, while driving home from a California recording studio after working late, he fell asleep at the wheel and was involved in a near-fatal car crash. The crash left him with a shattered jaw, which had to be wired shut in reconstructive surgery. The accident inspired West; two weeks after being admitted to a hospital, he recorded a song at the Record Plant with his jaw still wired shut. The composition, "Through the Wire", expressed West's experience after the accident, and helped lay the foundation for his debut album, as according to West "all the better artists have expressed what they were going through". West added that "the album was my medicine", as working on the record distracted him from the pain. "Through the Wire" was first available on West's Get Well Soon... mixtape, released December 2002. At the same time, West announced that he was working on an album called The College Dropout, whose overall theme was to "make your own decisions. Don't let society tell you, 'This is what you have to do.'"

== Recording ==
West began recording The College Dropout in 1999, taking four years to complete. Recording sessions took place at Record Plant in Los Angeles, California, but the production featured on the record took place elsewhere over the course of several years. According to John Monopoly, West's friend, manager and business partner, the album "...[didn't have] a particular start date. He's been gathering beats for years. He was always producing with the intention of being a rapper. There's beats on the album he's been literally saving for himself for years". At one point, West hovered between making a portion of the production in the studio and the majority within his own apartment in Hoboken, New Jersey. Because it was a two-bedroom apartment, West was able to set up a home studio in one of the rooms and his bedroom in the other.

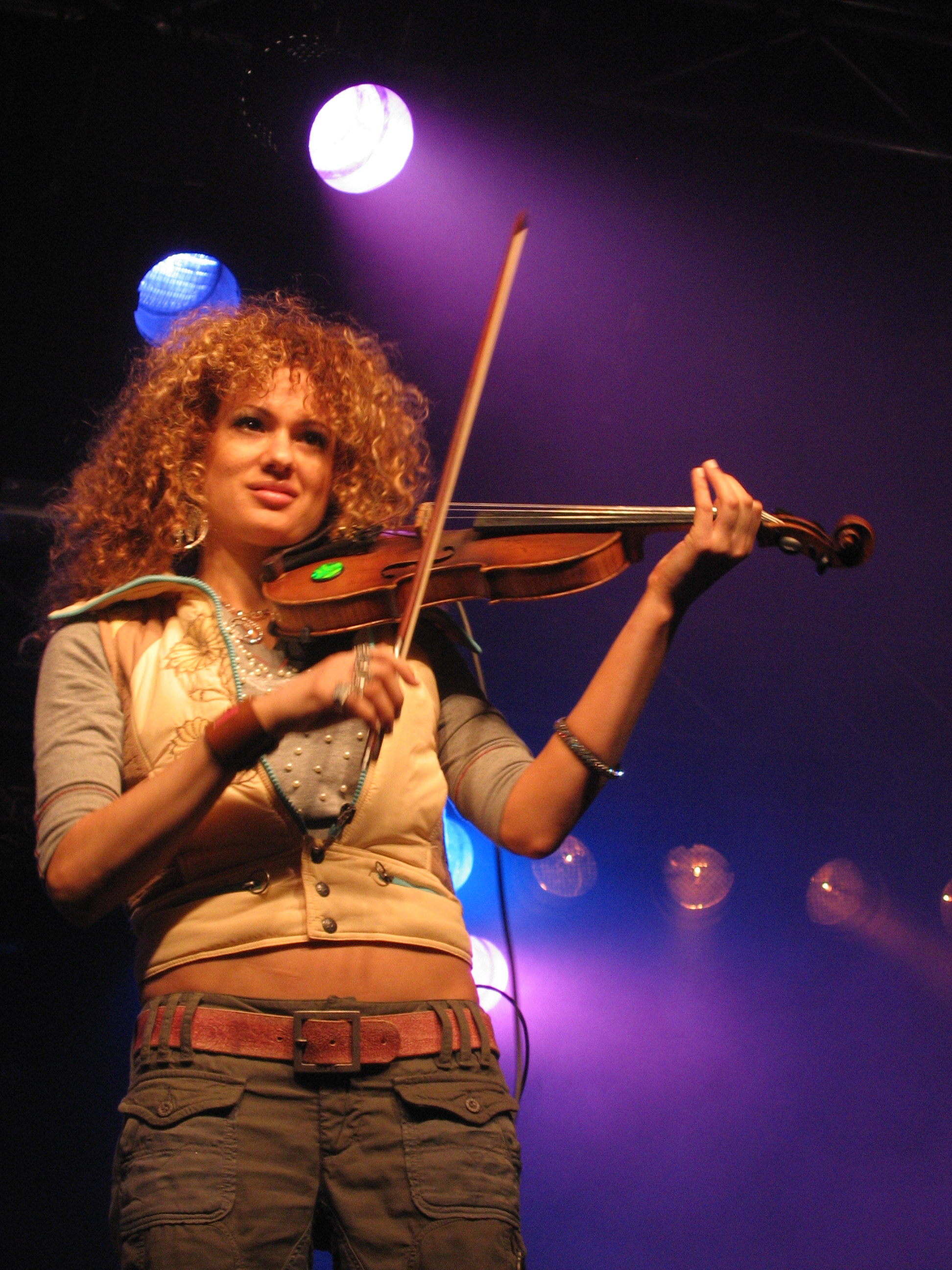
Violinist Miri Ben-Ari contributed to seven tracks.

West brought a Louis Vuitton backpack filled with old disks and demos to the studio, producing tracks in less than fifteen minutes at a time. He recorded the remainder of the album in Los Angeles while recovering from the car accident. Once he had completed the album, it was leaked months before its release date. However, West decided to use the opportunity to review the album, and The College Dropout was significantly remixed, remastered, and revised before being released. As a result, certain tracks originally destined for the album were subsequently retracted, among them "Keep the Receipt" with Ol' Dirty Bastard and "The Good, the Bad, and the Ugly" with Consequence. West meticulously refined the production, adding string arrangements, gospel choirs, improved drum programming and new verses. On his personal blog in 2009, West stated he was most inspired by The Miseducation of Lauryn Hill and listened to the album every day while working on The College Dropout.

The song "School Spirit" was censored for the album because Aretha Franklin would not allow the rapper to sample her music without censorship being promised. It was revealed by Plain Pat that there were around three other versions of the song, but West disliked them. Pat said in reference to the Franklin sample: "That song would have been so weak if we didn't get that sample cleared". In 2011, an uncensored version of the track was distributed online.

West finished recording around December 2003, according to his older cousin and singer Tony Williams, who was recruited by the rapper two weeks before the album's deadline to contribute vocals. Williams had impressed West by singing improvisations to "Spaceship" during one of their drives together. The singer later recounted recording with West for The College Dropout at the Record Plant: "I get in, go in the booth, start vibing out on 'Spaceship' and finished it up. At that point he was like, 'Ok, Well let me see what you do on this song.' I think that's when we did 'Last Call.' One song lead to another, and by the end of the weekend, I was on like five songs. Then we did the 'I'll Fly Away' joint". In a January 2020 interview with GQ, West revealed that around 30 to 40 percent of the album was recorded on a Roland VS-1680.

== Music and lyrics ==
The College Dropout diverged from the then-dominant gangster persona in hip-hop in favor of more diverse, topical subjects for the lyrics. Throughout the album, West touches on a number of different issues drawn from his own experiences and observations, including organized religion, family, sexuality, excessive materialism, self-consciousness, minimum wage labor, institutional prejudice, and personal struggles. Music journalist Kelefa Sanneh wrote, "Throughout the album, Mr. West taunts everyone who didn't believe in him: teachers, record executives, police officers, even his former boss at the Gap". West explained, "My persona is that I'm the regular person. Just think about whatever you've been through in the past week, and I have a song about that on my album". The album was musically notable for West's unique development of his "chipmunk soul" production style, in which R&B and soul music samples were sped up and pitch shifted.

"Through the Wire"
"Through the Wire" is an autobiographical song about West's 2002 car accident when he had to have his jaw wired shut. The track is representative of his production style, in which he samples and speeds up sections from classic soul records and uses them to create melodic hooks. The song's hook primarily samples Chaka Khan's 1984 hit "Through the Fire".

The album begins with a skit featuring a college professor asking West to deliver a graduation speech. The skit is followed by "We Don't Care" featuring West comically celebrating drug life with lines like "We wasn't supposed to make it past 25, joke's on you, we still alive" and then criticizing its influence amongst children. The next track, "Graduation Day", features Miri Ben-Ari on violin and vocals by John Legend.

On "All Falls Down", West wages an attack on consumerism. The song features singer Syleena Johnson and contains an interpolation of Lauryn Hill's "Mystery of Iniquity". West called upon Johnson to re-sing a vocal portion of "Mystery of Iniquity", which ended up in the final mix. Gospel hymn with doo-wop elements "I'll Fly Away" precedes "Spaceship", a track with a relaxed beat containing a soulful Marvin Gaye sample. The lyrics are mostly critical of the working world, where West muses about flying away in a spaceship to leave his boring job, and guest rappers GLC and Consequence compare the modern-day retail environment to slavery.

On "Jesus Walks", West professes his belief in Jesus, while also discussing how religion is used by various people and how the media seems to avoid songs that address matters of faith while embracing compositions on violence, sex, and drugs. "Jesus Walks" is built around a sample of "Walk With Me" as performed by the ARC Choir. Garry Mulholland of The Observer described it as a "towering inferno of martial beats, fathoms-deep chain gang backing chants, a defiant children's choir, gospel wails, and sizzling orchestral breaks". The first verse of the song is told through the eyes of a drug dealer seeking help from God, and it reportedly took over six months for West to draw inspiration for the second verse.

"Never Let Me Down" is influenced by West's near-death car crash. The song features Jay-Z, who rhymes about maintaining status and power given his chart success, while West comments on racism and poverty. The song features verses by spoken word performer J. Ivy who offers comments of upliftment. "Never Let Me Down" reuses a Jay-Z verse first heard in the remix of his song "Hovi Baby". "Get Em High" is a collaboration by West with two socially conscious rappers, Talib Kweli and Common. "The New Workout Plan" is a call to fitness to improve one's love life. "Slow Jamz" features Twista and Jamie Foxx and serves as a tribute to classic smooth soul artists and slow jam songs. The song also appeared on Twista's album Kamikaze. On the song "School Spirit", West relates the experience of dropping out of school and contains references to well-known fraternities, sororities, singer Norah Jones, and record label Roc-A-Fella Records. "Two Words" features commentary on social issues and features Mos Def, Freeway, and the Harlem Boys Choir.

"Through the Wire" features a high-pitched vocal sample of Chaka Khan and relates West's real life experience with being in a car accident. The song provides a mostly comedic account of his difficult recovery, and features West rapping with his jaw still wired shut from the accident. The chorus and instrumentals sample a pitched up version of Chaka Khan's 1985 single "Through the Fire". "Family Business" is a soulful tribute to the godbrother of Tarrey Torae, one of the many collaborators in the album. The song "Last Call" is about West's transition from being a producer to a rapper, and the album ends with a nearly nine-minute autobiographical monologue that follows the song "Last Call". However, this is not a separate track.

== Title and packaging ==
The album's title is in part a reference to West's decision to drop out of college to pursue his dream of becoming a musician. This action greatly displeased his mother, who was a professor at the university from which he withdrew. She later said, "It was drummed into my head that college is the ticket to a good life... but some career goals don't require college. For Kanye to make an album called [The] College Dropout it was more about having the guts to embrace who you are, rather than following the path society has carved out for you".

The artwork for the album was developed by Eric Duvauchelle, who was then part of Roc-A-Fella's in-house brand design team. West had already taken pictures dressed as the Dropout Bear – which would reappear in his later work – and Duvauchelle picked the image of him sitting on a set of bleachers, as he was attracted to the loneliness of what was supposed to be "the most popular representation of a school". The image is framed inside gold ornaments, which Duvauchelle found in a book of illustrations from the 16th-century and West wanted to use to "bring a sense of elegance and style to what was typically a gangster-led image of rap artists". The inside cover follows a college yearbook, with photos of the featured artists from their youth.

While the original release of the album features a brown background on the cover artwork, later remasters of the album feature a white background.

== Marketing and sales ==
The College Dropout was originally scheduled for release in August 2003, but West's perfectionist habits producing the album led to it being postponed three times. It was first delayed to October 2003, then to January 2004, before finally being released to stores on February 10, 2004.

In its first week of release, the album sold 441,000 copies and debuted at number two on the US Billboard 200 chart, being held off the top spot by Norah Jones' second studio album Feels Like Home. The College Dropout remained at the second spot behind Feels Like Home for two consecutive weeks, with 196,000 units sold in the second week and 132,000 in the third week, respectively. In 2004, The College Dropout ranked as the twelfth most popular of the year on the Billboard 200. The album had sold 2.3 million units in the United States by November 2004. By June 2014, the album had become West's best-selling album in the US at the time, with domestic sales of 3,358,000 copies. On July 17, 2026, The College Dropout was certified six-times platinum by the Recording Industry Association of America (RIAA). On the UK Albums Chart, the album peaked at number 12, and the British Phonographic Industry (BPI) had certified it triple platinum by April 22, 2022; this indicated shipments of 900,000 copies. As of 2018, The College Dropout is the fourteenth highest selling rap album in the UK in the 21st-century. The album has sold over 4 million copies worldwide.

In promotion of the album West headlined The School Spirit Tour, with 34 shows mostly taking place at universities from March to May 2004. West would also perform as an opening act for Usher's Truth Tour from August to October 2004.

Four of the singles released in promotion of the album became top-20 chart hits: "Through the Wire", "Slow Jamz", "All Falls Down" and "Jesus Walks". "The New Workout Plan" was the fifth and last single. "Spaceship" was planned to be the sixth single, but Def Jam decided to move on from The College Dropout's promotional campaign to begin marketing West's next album, Late Registration (2005). At one point, "Two Words" was also intended to be released as a single, and a video for the song was filmed, and later uploaded by West online in 2009.

== Critical reception ==
The College Dropout ratings
Aggregate scores
Source	Rating
Metacritic	87/100
Review scores
Source	Rating
AllMusic	5/5 stars
Blender	4/5 stars
Entertainment Weekly	A−
Los Angeles Times	3/4 stars
Mojo	4/5 stars
Pitchfork	8.2/10
Rolling Stone	3.5/5 stars
Spin	B+
USA Today	3.5/4 stars
The Village Voice	A

According to the review aggregator Metacritic, The College Dropout received "universal acclaim" based on a weighted average score of 87 out of 100 from 25 critic scores.

The record was hailed by Kelefa Sanneh from The New York Times as "2004's first great hip-hop album". Reviewing it for The A.V. Club, Nathan Rabin observed in the music "substance, social commentary, righteous anger, ornery humanism, dark humor, and even Christianity", calling it "one of those wonderful crossover albums that appeal to a huge audience without sacrificing a shred of integrity". The staff of Mojo said its exceptional hip-hop production was miraculous during a time when hip-hop's practice of sampling was becoming "increasingly litigious", and those of Urb deemed it "both visceral and emotive, sprinkling the dancefloors with tears and sweat". Dave Heaton from PopMatters found it "musically engaging" and "a genuine extension of Kanye's personality and experiences", while Hua Hsu of The Village Voice felt that his sped-up samples "carry a humble, human air", allowing listeners to "hear tiny traces of actual people inside". Fellow Village Voice critic Robert Christgau wrote that "not only does [West] create a unique role model, that role model is dangerous—his arguments against education are as market-targeted as other rappers' arguments for thug life". In the opinion of Stylus Magazine's Josh Love, West "subverts cliches from both sides of the hip-hop divide" while "trying to reflect the entire spectrum of hip-hop and black experience, looking for solace and salvation in the traditional safehouses of church and family". Entertainment Weekly's Michael Endelman elaborated on West's avoidance of the then-dominant "gangsta" persona of hip-hop:

West delivers the goods with a disarming mix of confessional honesty and sarcastic humor, earnest idealism and big-pimping materialism. In a scene still dominated by authenticity battles and gangsta posturing, he's a middle-class, politically conscious, post-thug, bourgeois rapper – and that's nothing to be ashamed of.

Some reviewers were more qualified in their praise. Rolling Stone's Jon Caramanica felt that "West isn't quite MC enough to hold down the entire disc", though claimed that West's "ace in the hole is his signature cozy sound", while Slant Magazine's Sal Cinquemani observed "too many guest artists, too many interludes, and just too many songs period" on what he considered a "chest-beatingly self-congratulatory" yet humorous, deeply sincere, and affecting record. It was regarded by Pitchfork critic Rob Mitchum as a "flawed, overlong, hypocritical, egotistical, and altogether terrific album". The staff of Rolling Stone were more receptive in a retrospective review than Caramanica was previously for the publication, calling the album "a demonstration that hip-hop—real, banging, commercial hip-hop—could be a vehicle for nuanced self-examination and musical subtlety".

=== Rankings ===
The College Dropout was voted as the best album of the year by The Village Voice's Pazz & Jop, an annual poll of American critics. The album elsewhere topped year-end lists by Rolling Stone, Spin, Vibe, and PopMatters. Dutch magazine OOR named it the seventh best album of 2004. Billboard named The College Dropout the second best album of 2004. Rhapsody named it the seventh best album of the decade and the fourth best hip-hop album of the decade.

In 2005, Pitchfork named it No. 50 in their best albums of 2000–2004. In 2006, the album was named by Time as one of the 100 best albums of all time. In its retrospective 2007 issue, XXL named it one of the magazine's "XXL"-rated releases; this perfect rating had previously been given by the magazine to only sixteen other albums. In 2012, Complex named the album one of the classic albums of the last decade, and the 20th best hip-hop debut album ever. Dagsavisen listed the album eleventh in its list of the top forty albums of the 2000s decade. The album was also included in the book 1001 Albums You Must Hear Before You Die. NME placed the album at 273 on its 2013 list of "The 500 Greatest Albums of All Time", while Rolling Stone ranked it at 74 on their list of "The 500 Greatest Albums of All Time" in 2020.

Select rankings of The College Dropout
Publication	List	Year	Rank	Ref.
The A.V. Club	The 50 Best Albums of the 2000s	2009	2	
Consequence	The Top 100 Albums of the 2000s	2009	16	
Consequence	The Top 100 Albums Ever	2010	100	
Consequence	The 25 Greatest Hip-Hop Debut Albums of All Time	2018	2	
Entertainment Weekly	The 100 Best Albums from 1983 to 2008	2008	4	
Entertainment Weekly	The 10 Best Albums of the Decade	2009	1	
NME	The 500 Greatest Albums of All Time	2013	273	
Paste	The 50 Best Albums of the Decade (2000–2009)	2009	17	
Pitchfork	Top 50 Albums of 2004	2004	18	
Pitchfork	The 200 Best Albums of the 2000s	2009	28	
Rolling Stone	The 100 Albums of the 2000s	2009	10	
Rolling Stone	The 500 Greatest Albums of All Time	2012	298	
Rolling Stone	The 100 Greatest Debut Albums of All Time	2013	19	
Rolling Stone	500 Greatest Albums of All Time	2020	74	
Rolling Stone	The 200 Greatest Hip-Hop Albums of All Time	2022	52	
Rolling Stone	The 250 Greatest Albums of the 21st Century So Far	2025	47	
Spin	The 300 Best Albums of the Past 30 Years (1985–2014)	2015	59	
Spin	The 50 Best Hip-Hop Debut Albums Since 'Reasonable Doubt'	2016	1	
The Times	The 100 Best Pop Albums of the Noughties	2009	13	
The Village Voice	The 2004 Pazz & Jop Critics Poll	2004	1	

=== Industry awards ===
Awards and nominations for The College Dropout
Year	Organization	Award	Result	Ref.
2004	American Music Awards	Favorite Rap/Hip-Hop Album	Nominated	
2004	Billboard Music Awards	R&B/Hip-Hop Album of the Year	Nominated	
2004	MOBO Awards	Best Album	Won	
2004	The Source Awards	Album of the Year	Won	
2004	Teen Choice Awards	Album of the Year	Won	
2005	Grammy Awards	Album of the Year	Nominated	
2005	Grammy Awards	Best Rap Album	Won	
2005	Groovevolt Music and Fashion Awards	Album of the Year	Won	
2005	Groovevolt Music and Fashion Awards	Best Hip-Hop Album	Won	
2005	NAACP Image Awards	Outstanding Album	Nominated	

== Influence ==
As a young black kid, especially one who got to walk the line between some dangerous environments and some much better ones, Kanye was this beautiful means to be true to both sides of me. I remember listening to The College Dropout on the bus from a Leadership Broward event where I was selected as one of the leaders of tomorrow or whatever. I remember listening to it as I walked by two black mothers in bed slippers fighting in the street. I remember listening to it on my way to catch the bus to go to a school out of my zone, so that I could get a better education. ... 'Spaceship', 'All Falls Down', 'Never Let Me Down', 'Jesus Walks', 'Family Business'. Those were anthems of mine that I kept in the back pocket of my heart as I walked the line between black people finding me too white or proper and white people clamoring for me to be their 'black friend'.

— Aundre Larrow, Chicago Reader (2014)

The College Dropout sparked a resurgence of socially conscious rap in the mid-2000s, arriving at a time when pop rap was saturated with songs featuring product placement and intensely violent lyrics, epitomized by rappers like 50 Cent, Nelly, Ja Rule, Ludacris, and P. Diddy. West instead created a space in the mainstream for rappers to express themselves and black identity without resorting to hip-hop's prevalent theme of gang culture. Raul Verma of The Independent said "West is charged with proving mainstream hip hop has a conscience with his nourishing messages of substance flying in the face of the amoral majority perpetuating clichés of guns, girls and bling", while Vibe senior editor Noah Callahan-Bever argued that West's infusion of "pop sensibility" into his otherwise progressive hip-hop had "bridged the gap" and encouraged rappers to gravitate more towards the center between mainstream and alternative forms. Today commented that The College Dropout "stood out in the rap landscape because of its atypical prose. It avoided the usual plotlines about sex, money and violence and touched on everything from his faith to his fears of failure and other crises from his life."

According to DJBooth journalist Brad Callas, the album also "helped solidify chipmunk soul as not only the defining sound of the Roc-A-Fella era but also the most popular sub-genre in hip-hop". "It feels like that album birthed an entire sub-genre", Max Weinstein wrote in retrospect for Vibe, going on to say, "The palette of emotions was so broad, the depth of topics so searingly relevant, that it was bound to make an impression on any artist that heard it. RZA might have birthed chipmunk soul, and Black Star perfected smart lyricism for the JanSport bunch, but 'Ye brought all that to the masses in one single, digestible product, breaking down the divisions between mainstream rap and Rawkus-grade consciousness." Weinstein also credited The College Dropout with directly influencing 10 albums: Lupe Fiasco's Food & Liquor (2006) by Lupe Fiasco, School Was My Hustle (2006) by Kidz in the Hall, Don't Quit Your Day Job! (2007) by Consequence, A Kid Named Cudi (2008) by Kid Cudi, Asleep in the Bread Aisle (2009) by Asher Roth, Kendrick Lamar's self-titled first EP (2009), Camp (2011) by Childish Gambino, Cole World: The Sideline Story (2011) by J. Cole, When Fish Ride Bicycles (2011) by The Cool Kids, and Acid Rap (2013) by Chance the Rapper.

With the album, West began to develop a following of listeners who could not relate to lyrics glorifying gangster lifestyle but still enjoyed rap music and connected more with his musings on family and love. In 2005, comedian Chris Rock attested to listening to The College Dropout while writing his stand-up material. Music journalists such as Meaghan Garvey, Andrew Barber, and Erika Ramirez also connected to the album during their formative years, with Barber saying in a roundtable discussion for Noisey, "I could identify with this project the most because I was in college at the time, and I felt like an underdog in my own life. I was uncertain of my future. [West's] words on 'Last Call' inspired me to follow my dreams, and motivated me to graduate despite the album title." In the same discussion, music journalist Eric Sundermann cited The College Dropout as the first in West's pop rap album trilogy that would be followed by Late Registration in 2005 and Graduation in 2007, while Craig Jenkins called it "a watershed moment in 2000s rap history where the nerds stormed the school to seize control from the jocks, a shift memorialized two albums later when Graduation trounced 50 Cent's Curtis album in their 2007 sales showdown."

== Track listing ==
All tracks are produced by Kanye West, except "Last Call" (co-produced with Evidence; additional production by Porse) and "Breathe In Breathe Out" (co-produced with Brian Miller).

The College Dropout standard edition
No.	Title	Writer(s)	Length
1.	"Intro (Skit)"	Kanye West	0:19
2.	"We Don't Care"	West; Miri Ben-Ari; Ross Vannelli	3:59
3.	"Graduation Day"	West; John Stephens; Ben-Ari	1:22
4.	"All Falls Down" (featuring Syleena Johnson)	West; Lauryn Hill	3:43
5.	"I'll Fly Away"	Albert E. Brumley	1:09
6.	"Spaceship" (featuring GLC and Consequence)	West; Leonard Harris; Dexter Mills; Marvin Gaye; Gwen Gordy Fuqua; Sandra Greene	5:24
7.	"Jesus Walks"	West; Che Smith; Ben-Ari; Curtis Lundy	3:13
8.	"Never Let Me Down" (featuring Jay-Z and J. Ivy)	West; Shawn Carter; James Richardson; Michael Bolton; Bruce Kulick	5:24
9.	"Get Em High" (featuring Talib Kweli and Common)	West; Talib Kweli Greene; Lonnie Rashid Lynn Jr.	4:49
10.	"Workout Plan (Skit)"	West	0:46
11.	"The New Workout Plan"	West; Stephens; Bosco Kante; Sumeke Rainey; Ben-Ari	5:22
12.	"Slow Jamz" (Twista featuring Kanye West and Jamie Foxx)	West; Carl Mitchell; Burt Bacharach; Hal David	5:16
13.	"Breathe In Breathe Out" (featuring Ludacris)	West; Brian Miller	4:06
14.	"School Spirit (Skit 1)"	West	1:18
15.	"School Spirit"	West; Aretha Franklin	3:02
16.	"School Spirit (Skit 2)"	West	0:43
17.	"Lil Jimmy (Skit)"	West	0:53
18.	"Two Words" (featuring Mos Def, Freeway, and the Boys Choir of Harlem)	West; Dante Smith; Leslie Pridgen; Lou Wilson; Ric Wilson; Carlos Wilson	4:26
19.	"Through the Wire"	West; David Foster; Tom Keane; Cynthia Weil	3:41
20.	"Family Business"	West	4:38
21.	"Last Call"	West; Michael Perretta; Tony Williams; Ken Lewis	12:40
Total length:			76:13

=== 2005 Japanese special edition ===
Bonus track
No.	Title	Writer(s)	Length
22.	"Heavy Hitters" (featuring GLC)	West; Harris	3:55
Total length:			80:08

Bonus CD
No.	Title	Length
1.	"We Don't Care (Reprise)" (featuring Keyshia Cole)	2:57
2.	"Jesus Walks (Remix)" (featuring Mase and Common)	4:58
3.	"It's Alright" (featuring Mase and John Legend)	3:51
4.	"The New Workout Plan (Remix)" (featuring Fonzworth Bentley, Luke, and Twista; produced by Lil Jon)	4:02
5.	"Two Words (Cinematic)" (featuring the Harlem Boys Choir)	4:06
6.	"Never Let Me Down (Cinematic)"	5:16
Total length:		25:07

=== Sample credits ===
- "We Don't Care" contains samples of "I Just Wanna Stop", written by Ross Vannelli and performed by the Jimmy Castor Bunch.
- "All Falls Down" contains interpolations of Lauryn Hill's "Mystery of Iniquity", performed here by Syleena Johnson.
- "Spaceship" contains samples of "Distant Lover", written by Marvin Gaye, Gwen Gordy Fuqua and Sandra Greene, and performed by Marvin Gaye.
- "Jesus Walks" contains samples of "Walk with Me", performed by The ARC Choir and "(Don't Worry) If There's a Hell Below, We're All Going to Go", written and performed by Curtis Mayfield.
- "Never Let Me Down" contains samples of "Maybe It's the Power of Love", written by Michael Bolton and Bruce Kulick, and performed by Blackjack.
- "Slow Jamz" contains samples of "A House Is Not a Home", written by Burt Bacharach and Hal David, and performed by Luther Vandross.
- "School Spirit" contains samples of "Spirit in the Dark", written and performed by Aretha Franklin.
- "Two Words" contains samples of "Peace & Love (Amani Na Mapenzi) – Movement IV (Encounter)", written by Lou Wilson, Ric Wilson and Carlos Wilson, and performed by Mandrill.
- "Through the Wire" contains samples of "Through the Fire", written by David Foster, Tom Keane and Cynthia Weil, and performed by Chaka Khan.
- "Family Business" contains samples of "Fonky Thang", written by Terry Callier and Charles Stepney, and performed by The Dells.
- "Last Call" contains samples of "Mr. Rockefeller", written by Jerry Blatt and Bette Midler, and performed by Bette Midler.

== Personnel ==
Credits are adapted from the album's liner notes.

=== Musicians ===
- John Legend – vocals (track 3), additional vocals (tracks 2, 6, 7, 11, 21), background vocals (track 8), piano (track 3)
- DeRay – additional vocals (tracks 1, 5, 14, 16, 17)
- Tony Williams – additional vocals (track 5, 6, 15, 17, 21)
- Sumeke Rainey – additional vocals (tracks 9, 11)
- Tracie Spencer – additional vocals (track 12), background vocals (track 8)
- Riccarda Watkins – additional vocals (track 2)
- Candis Brown – additional vocals (track 10)
- Brandi Kuykenvall – additional vocals (track 10)
- Tiera Singleton – additional vocals (track 10)
- Aisha Tyler – additional vocals (track 12)
- Thomasina Atkins – additional vocals (track 20)
- Linda Petty – additional vocals (track 20)
- Beverly McCargo – additional vocals (track 20)
- Lavel Mena – additional vocals (track 20)
- Thai Jones – additional vocals (track 20)
- Kevin Shannon – additional vocals (track 20)
- Tarey Torae – additional vocals (track 20)
- Rude Jude – additional vocals (track 22)
- Terrence Hardy – "kids" vocals (track 2)
- Diamond Alabi-Isama – "kids" vocals (track 2)
- James "JT" Knight – "kids" vocals (track 2)
- Keyshia Cole – background vocals (track 2)
- Ervin "EP" Pope – keyboards (tracks 8, 12), piano (tracks 5, 11, 17, 21)
- Glenn Jefferey – guitars (tracks 8, 12, 21)
- Keenan "Kee-note" Holloway – bass (tracks 8, 12), additional bass (track 21)
- Frank Walker – percussion (tracks 3, 8, 12)
- Ken Lewis – acoustic guitar (track 4), sample recreation and performance (track 8), additional instrumentation (track 20), guitar, bass, keyboard, percussion, vocal (track 21)
- Eric "E-Bass" Johnson – guitars (tracks 4, 11)
- Bosko – talkbox (track 11)
- Keith Slattery – keyboards (track 18)
- Scott Ward – bass guitar (track 19)
- Josh Zandman – piano (track 20)
- Miri Ben-Ari – violins production, writing, arrangement and performance (tracks 2, 3, 7, 11, 13, 18, 22)

=== Production ===
- Rabeka Tunei – recording (tracks 1, 4–6, 8, 10, 14–17, 20, 21)
- Eugene A. Toale – recording (tracks 2, 3, 7, 11, 13, 22)
- Andrew Dawson – recording (tracks 6, 7, 11, 15)
- Anthony Kilhoffer – recording (tracks 3, 8, 9)
- Tatsuya Sato – recording (tracks 4, 6, 7)
- Rich Balmer – recording (tracks 2, 22)
- Brent Kolatalo – recording (tracks 8, 21), assistant engineering (track 22)
- Keith Slattery – recording (tracks 11, 18)
- Jacob Andrew – recording (tracks 13, 20)
- Gimel "Guru" Keaton – recording (track 8)
- Jacelyn Parry – recording (track 8)
- Michael Eleopoulos – recording (track 9)
- Dave Dar – recording (track 9)
- Jason Rauhoff – recording (track 13)
- Marc Fuller – recording (track 18)
- Carlisle Young – recording (track 18)
- Francis Graham – recording (track 19)
- Manny Marroquin – mixing (tracks 1–10, 12–17, 19–21)
- Jared Lopez – mixing (track 11)
- Mike Dean – mixing (track 18)
- Ken Lewis – mixing (track 22)
- Eddy Schreyer – mastering

=== Design ===
- Danny Clinch – photography
- Eric Duvauchelle – art direction and design
- Mike Godshall – art direction and design
- Jim Morris – art direction and design
- Stephanie Reynolds – art direction and design
- Lauri Rowe – art direction and design
- Bobby Naugle – Dropout Bear logo design
- Sam Hansen – Dropout Bear logo design

== Charts ==
=== Weekly charts ===
Weekly chart performance
Chart (2004)	Peak position
Canadian Albums (Nielsen SoundScan)	11
Canadian R&B Albums (Nielsen SoundScan)	5
Dutch Albums (Album Top 100)	53
French Albums (SNEP)	98
German Albums (Offizielle Top 100)	77
Irish Albums (IRMA)	13
Norwegian Albums (VG-lista)	27
Scottish Albums (Official Charts)	23
Swedish Albums (Sverigetopplistan)	39
Swiss Albums (Schweizer Hitparade)	96
UK Albums (Official Charts)	12
UK R&B Albums (Official Charts)	2
US Billboard 200	2
US Top R&B/Hip-Hop Albums (Billboard)	1

Weekly chart performance
Chart (2007)	Peak position
US Top Catalog Albums (Billboard)	1

Weekly chart performance
Chart (2014)	Peak position
US Vinyl Albums (Billboard)	13

Weekly chart performance
Chart (2022)	Peak position
Belgian Albums (Ultratop Flanders)	55
Canadian Albums (Billboard)	38
Danish Albums (Hitlisten)	30
US Billboard 200	11

Weekly chart performance
Chart (2024)	Peak position
Portuguese Albums (AFP)	135

Weekly chart performance
Chart (2025)	Peak position
Hungarian Physical Albums (MAHASZ)	30

Weekly chart performance
Chart (2026)	Peak position
Croatian International Albums (HDU)	14

=== Year-end charts ===
Year-end chart performance
Chart (2004)	Position
UK Albums (OCC)	34
US Billboard 200	12
US Top R&B/Hip-Hop Albums (Billboard)	4
Worldwide Charts (IFPI)	21

Year-end chart performance
Chart (2005)	Position
US Billboard 200	176
US Top R&B/Hip-Hop Albums (Billboard)	94

Year-end chart performance
Chart (2016)	Position
Australian Urban Albums (ARIA)	94

Year-end chart performance
Chart (2022)	Position
US Billboard 200	97
US Top R&B/Hip-Hop Albums (Billboard)	68

=== Decade-end charts ===
Decade-end chart performance
Chart (2000–2009)	Position
US Billboard 200	155

== Certifications ==
Certifications and sales
Region	Certification	Certified units/sales
Canada (Music Canada)	Platinum	100,000^{^}
Denmark (IFPI Danmark)	2× Platinum	40,000^{‡}
Italy (FIMI) sales + streams since 2009	Gold	25,000^{‡}
New Zealand (RMNZ)	2× Platinum	30,000^{‡}
United Kingdom (BPI)	3× Platinum	900,000^{‡}
United States (RIAA)	6× Platinum	6,000,000^{‡}
^{^} Shipments figures based on certification alone.^{‡} Sales+streaming figures based on certification alone.

== See also ==
- 2004 in hip-hop
- Kanye West albums discography
- Kanye West production discography
- The College Dropout Video Anthology
- List of Billboard number-one R&B albums of 2004
- College Dropout (restaurant)

== Bibliography ==
- Brown, Jake (2006). Kanye West in the Studio: Beats Down! Money Up! (2000–2006). Colossus Books. ISBN 0-9767735-6-2.
- Hess, Mickey (2007). Icons of Hip Hop: an Encyclopedia of the Movement, Music, and Culture. Greenwood Publishing Group. ISBN 978-0-313-33904-2.
- West, Donda; Hunter, Karen (2007). Raising Kanye: Life Lessons from the Mother of a Hip-Hop Superstar. Simon & Schuster. ISBN 978-1-4165-4470-8.
