= The New Workout Plan =

2004 single by Kanye West

Single by Kanye West

from the album The College Dropout
- Released: August 31, 2004
- Recorded: 2003 at Quad Recordings and Sony Music Studios (New York City)
- Genre: Comedy hip hop
- Length: 5:22
- Label: Roc-A-Fella; Def Jam
- Songwriters: Kanye West; Miri Ben-Ari; Sumeke Rainey; John Stephens; Bosko Kante
- Producer: Kanye West

Kanye West singles chronology
"Jesus Walks" (2004)	"The New Workout Plan" (2004)	"The Food" (2004)

Music videos
- "The New Workout Plan" (Long Version) on YouTube; "The New Workout Plan" (Short Version) on YouTube

"The New Workout Plan" is a comedy hip-hop song from Kanye West's debut album, The College Dropout (2004). The song was written and produced by West, with additional songwriting from John Legend, Miri Ben-Ari, Sumeke Rainey, and Bosko Kante. The song was recorded in 2003 at Quad Recordings and Sony Music Studios in New York City. It would later be released as the album's fifth single on the 31st of August, 2004.

Upon the release of The College Dropout, the song received positive reviews from music critics. Commercially, the single peaked at number 59 on the Hot R&B/Hip-Hop Songs chart. The music video was released the same year, with cameos from Legend, Ben-Ari, Anna Nicole Smith, Fonzworth Bentley, Tracee Ellis Ross, Vida Guerra and GLC. The talk box harmonizing heard towards the end of the song would later be sampled by J. Cole for his 2011 single "Work Out".

== Composition ==
The lyrics of "The New Workout Plan" are voiced from the point of view of different girls reacting to a fake workout video. West explains unusual "testimonials" from women who have successfully undergone the workout plan and have been able to attain a lavish lifestyle thanks to being in shape.

== Critical reception ==
The song was subject to generally favorable reviews from music critics. Derek Xu of Medium looked at it as being "a satirical anthem, just like "We Don't Care"". Tareck Ghoneim of Contactmusic.com had praise for West's performance: "[he shows] excellent wordplay that is original, humorous and the touch of irony makes for very clever use of lyrics". Paul Cantor of Billboard acknowledged that "Some critics argue that "The New Workout Plan" doesn't fit in with the rest of [The College Dropout]", but praised it as what "should be commended as much for its conceptual ingenuity as its arrangement".

== Music video ==
The official music video was directed by Little X, both short and long versions of the video for the song were officially released in 2004. The video features West in a faux 1980s-era workout video as he instructs women how to transform themselves into housewives. Cameo appearances are included from John Legend, Miri Ben-Ari, Anna Nicole Smith, Fonzworth Bentley, Tracee Ellis Ross, Vida Guerra and GLC. Anna Nicole Smith's cameo sees her playing the role of Ella-May and having a star like her frequently featured in a video of West's went against the idea of so many at the time that he'd fail as a rapper.

== Commercial performance ==
The track peaked at #59 on the U.S. Billboard Hot R&B/Hip-Hop Songs chart on November 9, 2004, which was around two months after its release as a single, and it spent a total of 21 weeks on the chart. The song was also certified Gold by the Recording Industry Association of America (RIAA), for equivalent sales of 500,000 units in the United States.

== Legacy ==
Forrest Wickman of Slate looked at "Highlights" from West's seventh studio album The Life of Pablo (2016) as ending "with another new workout plan", whilst Austin Isaacsohn of Medium wrote of the album two years after its release "Kanye has taken a beating over the years, man. Listen to "The New Workout Plan" off [The College] Dropout, then listen to "Wolves"." Raleigh-based rapper J. Cole sampled "The New Workout Plan" in his 2011 hit single "Work Out", but despite sampling the original, Cole revealed himself to not be a fan of the song personally.

== Track listing ==
CD single

1. "The New Workout Plan" (Album Version) (Explicit) – 5:22
2. "Heavy Hitters" (Dirty) – 3:57
3. "Workout Plan" (Video) (Short Version) – 5:12

== Personnel ==
Information taken from The College Dropout liner notes.

- Songwriter: Kanye West
- Record producer: Kanye West
- Recorder: Keith Slattery, Andrew Dawson, Eugene A. Toale
- Mix engineer: Manny Marroquin
- Background vocals: John Legend, Sumeke Rainey
- Guitar: Eric "E-Bass" Johnson
- Piano: Ervin "EP" Pope
- Violin: Miri Ben-Ari

== Charts ==
Chart performance for "The New Workout Plan"
Chart (2004)	Peak position
US Hot R&B/Hip-Hop Songs (Billboard)	59

== Certifications ==
Certifications for "The New Workout Plan"
Region	Certification	Certified units/sales
United States (RIAA)	Platinum	1,000,000^{‡}
^{‡} Sales+streaming figures based on certification alone.

== Release history ==
Region	Date	Format(s)	Label(s)	Ref.
United States	September 20, 2004	Rhythmic contemporary · urban contemporary radio	Roc-A-Fella, IDJMG	
United States	November 1, 2004	Contemporary hit radio	Roc-A-Fella, IDJMG	

== Remix ==
"The New Workout Plan (Remix)"

Song by Kanye West featuring Fonzworth Bentley, Luke and Twista

from the album The College Dropout Video Anthology
- Released: March 22, 2005
- Recorded: 2004
- Genre: Hip hop
- Length: 4:01
- Label: Roc-A-Fella; Def Jam
- Songwriters: Kanye West; Derek Watkins; Luther Campbell; Carl Mitchell; Jonathan Smith
- Producer: Lil Jon

The official remix for the song was produced by Lil Jon and features a new verse by West and guest appearances from Twista, Luke, and Fonzworth Bentley. The remix was recorded in 2005, and was written by West, Bentley, Luke, and Twista, alongside Lil Jon, who also produced the remix. It was originally included on The College Dropout Video Anthology, released on the 22nd of March, 2005, through Roc-A-Fella Records and Def Jam Recordings. It would later be included on the Japanese special edition of The College Dropout, released that same year.
