= Jesus Walks =

2004 single by Kanye West

Single by Kanye West

from the album The College Dropout
- B-side: "Heavy Hitters"
- Released: May 25, 2004
- Recorded: 2000–2003
- Studio: Sony Music Studios, Light @ The End of the Tunnel, New York City
- Genre: Hip-hop; gospel; Christian hip-hop
- Length: 3:13
- Label: Roc-A-Fella; Def Jam
- Songwriters: Kanye West; Che Smith; Miri Ben-Ari; Curtis Lundy
- Producer: Kanye West

Kanye West singles chronology
"This Way" (2004)	"Jesus Walks" (2004)	"The New Workout Plan" (2004)

Music video
- "Jesus Walks (Version 2)" on YouTube

"Jesus Walks" is a song by American rapper Kanye West. It was released on May 25, 2004, as the fourth single from his debut album The College Dropout (2004). The song contains a sample of "Walk with Me" as performed by the ARC Choir. "Jesus Walks" was acclaimed by music critics, who praised its compelling sonic atmosphere and boldness in its open embrace of faith. It was met by widespread commercial success, peaking at No. 11 on the Billboard Hot 100 and becoming West's fourth consecutive top-twenty hit in the United States.

The single was accompanied by three separate music videos, each of which visually interpreted a portion of its multifaceted context in different ways. "Jesus Walks" continues to be a crowd favorite and stands as one of the most-performed songs by West, who has included it within all of his headlining tours. At the 47th Grammy Awards, "Jesus Walks" was awarded the Grammy Award for Best Rap Song, and received a nomination for Song of the Year.

Various publications placed the song on several year and decade-end lists, and have since listed it among the greatest of all time. The song was named the best song of 2004 on Village Voice's Pazz & Jop critics poll. Pitchfork listed it at No. 123 on its list of the 200 Best Songs of the 2000s, while NME placed it at No. 69 on its list of the "150 Best Tracks of the Past 15 Years" in October 2014. Rolling Stone named the song No. 19 on their list of the 100 Best Songs of the 2000s, and later placed it at No. 273 on its 2010 list of The 500 Greatest Songs of All Time.

== Background ==
The song is essentially a spiritual exultation, wherein West discusses how Jesus "walks" with all manner of people, from the sinner to the saint. Towards this end, the first conceptual verse of the song is told through the eyes of a drug dealer contemplating his relationship with God. It reportedly took over six months for West to draw inspiration for the second verse. West also uses the song to express his critical views on how the media seem to shy away from songs that address matters of faith, while embracing songs discussing violence, sex, and illegal drugs. He rhymes, "So here go my single, dawg, radio needs this/They say you can rap about anything except for Jesus/That means guns, sex, lies, video tapes/But if I talk about God my record won't get played, huh?" This is directly taken from West's experiences when he was struggling to get signed onto a record label; many executives turned him down after he played a demo of the song for them. They reasoned that he did not conform to the stereotypes associated with mainstream hip-hop and therefore was not easily marketable. Many of his friends in the music industry also warned him that while the song was outstanding, it would never make it to radio.

== Composition ==
"Jesus Walks"
A 29 second sample of "Jesus Walks" showcasing West's rapping and the song's production.

"Jesus Walks" is a mid-tempo hip-hop song. It is set in common time with a moderate tempo of 87 beats per minute and composed in the key of E-flat minor. The song expresses a pulsating rhythm reminiscent to that of a marching band. The rhythm is accompanied by background vocal samples from the ARC Choir's arrangement of the traditional gospel song "Walk With Me" that emit a chant in cadence to the beat. Because of these elements, the composition has been widely described as evoking a militaristic atmosphere. The song begins with a medium tempo followed by its backing vocals and choral arrangement. After West's brief opening dialog, a drumroll sounds and the track's titular hook is belted by the ARC (Addicts Rehabilitation Center) choir and coupled with the chorus. Meanwhile, the song's melody is laced with auto-tune-processed gospel wails. Over time the song amasses itself, exhibiting multi-tracked violin flourishes and momentary vocal solos, gradually growing in intensity before peaking and immediately dissipating. The song repeats this process several times until it fades away completely at its conclusion.

The militant soundscape of "Jesus Walks" is complemented by its lyrical nuances. In the intro, the voice of a drill sergeant initiates the song with an "Order Arms" and is answered by a squad of soldiers who shout "1-2-3-4!" This exchange is followed by West's opening lines, where he declares, "we are at war with ourselves." West retains a considerable amount of dynamics in his rap delivery, as his flow features constant shifts in cadence, pitch, and volume over the simplistic rhythm. During the chorus, his voice builds in intensity in conjunction with the similarly swelling track, and peaks and fades away just before it follows suit. He also employs various rhyme schemes and phrasal techniques, at one point even using a call-and-response pattern.

== Critical reception ==
The single received universal acclaim from critics for its open embracement of faith in the face of the oft-secular music industry, with many expressing their astonishment that such an overtly religious song was embraced by radio. In a review of The College Dropout, Village Voice characterized the song as a "desperate masterpiece." Stylus Magazine music reviewer Josh Love cited "Jesus Walks" as the best song on the entire album, saying "Kanye makes his spiritual toil sound like triumph thanks to martial drums and a little gospel choir fervor, sounding a clarion call of salvation to all would-be doubters and haters. He swears that he's not trying to 'convert atheists into believers,' but listening to The College Dropout might just convince you that Kanye West is the Second City's Second Coming." The Los Angeles Times similarly considered "Jesus Walks" to be the highlight of the album, stating, "Its pulsating drums serve as the perfect backing for West's reflections on his own mistakes as well as hip-hop's tendency to focus on negative subject matter." PopMatters, which hailed "Jesus Walks" as the year's best single, listed the song as one of the primary tracks which exemplified the thoughtfulness and scholastic complexity inherent of The College Dropout as a whole, commenting that, "On 'Jesus Walks' Kanye proclaims his devotion to Jesus as seriously as the most devotional hymn singer would, while illustrating the way he falls in and out of what he perceives as the good path to follow. 'I wanna talk to God but I'm afraid cause we ain't spoke in so long,' he confesses, but then he goes ahead and asks us all to join him in that conversation, to push the song onto radio and push the divine into the heart of public dialogue. Extra dimensions are added to the song by the intense, cinematic presence it has, with all of the drama of a gangster film's climactic scenes, and by a Curtis Mayfield drop that makes the song ripe for a study of intertextuality."

Alongside its subject matter, the production quality of the track received equal acclaim, with Garry Mulholland of The Observer chronicling it as "[a] towering inferno of martial beats, fathoms-deep chain gang backing chants, a defiant children's choir, gospel wails, and sizzling orchestral breaks." Kelefa Sanneh of The New York Times, who classified "Jesus Walks" as a gospel song, concurred with this sentiment, describing the song's choral arrangement as "clever". Blender likened the beat of the song to a "phantom marching army", and Entertainment Weekly testified that the "lush, intricate" production of the track gave off an "uplifting" presence. Time magazine critic Josh Tyrangiel declared "Jesus Walks" as "one of those miraculous songs that you hear for the first time and immediately look forward to hearing on a semiregular basis for the next 30 or 40 years." Sasha Frere-Jones of The New Yorker asserted that the song, "sounds simultaneously like V-Day and like a funeral" and concluded his review stating, "In a different year, 'Jesus Walks' might register as an eccentric's conflation of faith, commerce, and war. In 2004, it's a popular state of consciousness."

== Accolades ==
"Jesus Walks" was praised as one of the best songs of the year by numerous publications, including Blender, Rolling Stone, and Village Voice. The song received a nomination for Outstanding Song as well as Outstanding Music Video at the 36th NAACP Image Awards. At the Grammy Awards of 2005, "Jesus Walks" was nominated for Song of the Year, one of ten total nominations West received for that year alone. West, Rhymefest and Miri Ben-Ari won the Grammy Award for Best Rap Song for co-writing the song's lyrics and violin arrangements respectively. The music video won the 2005 MTV Video Music Award for best male video while West also received a nomination for Best Gospel Artist for "Jesus Walks" at the 2005 BET Awards, although he was not an actual gospel musician.

As a result of the significance and impact of "Jesus Walks", in August, The College Dropout was nominated for several gospel Stellar Awards, including Best Gospel Rap Album. However, the awards committees determined that the secular album was ineligible and subsequently withdrew the ballot. West surmised that the fact that they recognized the song in the first place demonstrated its impact, and said the song and its message was not meant for the evangelical audience, but for "... the people that I think God is really trying to reach." He also clarified his views on religion, saying, "Religion just means that you do something over and over. I will say that I'm spiritual. I have accepted Jesus as my Savior. And I will say that I fall short every day." Kanye later claimed that when his father heard the song, he said, "Maybe you missed your calling." To which West replied, "No, maybe this is my calling. I reach more people than any one pastor can." In retrospect, West maintained that while he was surprised by the accolades the song received, he had long predicted the radio success of "Jesus Walks". For him, it was all just a matter of attaining airplay, saying, "It was never a problem once it came out. All I did was use reverse psychology. It was a way of calling out people who didn't want to play it without pointing fingers at anybody."

The song was named the sixth best song of 2004 on Village Voice's Pazz & Jop critics poll. "Jesus Walks" was ranked number 273 Rolling Stone's list of the 500 Greatest Songs of All Time. Rolling Stone also named the song number 19 on their list of 100 Best Songs of the 2000s. BET named it the second best song of the 2000s. In October 2011, NME placed it at number 69 on its list "150 Best Tracks of the Past 15 Years". In 2012, Consequence named it the 89th Greatest song of all time. In January 2013, BBC Radio 6 Music readers voted for it as the 88th greatest song released in 6 Music's lifetime. In 2017, Rolling Stone placed it 32 in its list of Greatest Hip-Hop Songs of all time.

== Commercial performance ==
"Jesus Walks" appeared on the Hot R&B/Hip-Hop Songs chart at No. 74 on the issue dated February 21. After sixth months, the track peaked at No. 2 for the issue dated August 14 and maintained the position for two weeks. "Jesus Walks" first came in at No. 25 on Hot Rap Tracks for the issue dated April 17. On the issue date of August 7, the song peaked at No. 3.

Despite all prior disapproval, "Jesus Walks" came to be one of West's biggest hits. The single was the highest debut on the Billboard Hot 100 for the week of its first appearance, entering the chart at No. 68 on April 29, 2004. Over the next eight weeks, the song climbed up the chart until it eventually reached No. 16 for the issue dated July 3, where it remained for four weeks. On the issue dated July 24, the song climbed up two places to reach the fourteenth position. "Jesus Walks" reached its overall peak at No. 11 on the issue date of July 31, where it stayed for two weeks in a row. "Jesus Walks" has since been awarded a triple platinum certification by the Recording Industry Association of America for pushing 3,000,000 certified units in the US.

"Jesus Walks" attained a certain extent of international success as well. In Ireland, the song peaked at No. 18 on September 2, 2004, where it remained for two weeks. The song's highest debut occurred in the United Kingdom, where it entered at its peak position of sixteen on September 5, becoming West's third top-twenty hit. On March 14, 2005, the song debuted in the Australian Singles Chart at No. 37.

== Music videos ==
In total, three separate music videos were made for "Jesus Walks," with the second and third financed by West himself out-of-pocket. All three were premiered on June 21, 2004, at TriBeCa Cinemas, where West explained, "That song evokes so much emotion, and four minutes of imagery limits the ideas that you're supposed to give for the songs, so I had to do three." West had originally wanted Hype Williams to direct the first version of "Jesus Walks" but decided not to because he had heard that Jay-Z was thinking about enlisting Williams for "99 Problems." Instead, West went with Michael Haussman for the music video, which was filmed in California and budgeted at $650,000. In the video, West is portrayed as a preacher rapping before a congregation from a pulpit while angels guide a prostitute, an alcoholic, and a drug dealer to his Baptist church.

"His hate is so all-consuming that he tries to carry the burning cross back up the mountain. That's the physical manifestation of his hate, and he wants it to get to the top of the mountain for the world to see. He's so blinded by his hate that he doesn't [consider that his robe will burn]. But God forgives him and causes it to rain, therefore extinguishing [the fire], and that's a sort of baptism; washing away his sins. I doubt anyone's anyone got all that, but it's nice to at least make an attempt to build in some layers. I know a lot of it is going to be lost in the translation of just being a music video, but the song is so deep and powerful it necessitates going the extra step with the visual metaphors."

— Chris Milk on the video's metaphoric imagery

West was not satisfied with the music video and convinced then-label head Dame Dash to commission another, this time for $500,000. The second version was directed by Chris Milk and takes place in the deep South. The core concept behind the video, which Milk described as his most complex narrative, was to take various deplorable characters and merge them with biblical iconography in order convey the message that God is with them. The secondary objective was to display the duality of man. The video stands as the most metaphorical of the three, as it features West rapping in a hallway which is filled alternately with hellish flames and angelic light, in conjunction with footage of drug traffickers being pursued through a barren desert by police, prison camp inmates battling with guards, and a Ku Klux Klansman setting himself on fire while carrying a burning cross up a mountain. The video was named as one of the best of the 2000s decade by Dugald Baird of The Guardian.

The final version of "Jesus Walks" was filmed in West's hometown of Chicago and co-directed by himself with Coodie & Chike (Coodie Simmons and Chike Ozah of Channel Zero). Filmed guerrilla-style within the course of one day at a budget of $40,000, the third version was the least expensive of the three. It depicts Jesus in the modern day, literally walking beside the protagonist as he travels from his home to church, performing miracles along the way. The video premiered on MTV.com on June 23, 2004.

The music video received several wins and nominations; It earned two nominations at the 2005 MTV Video Music Awards for Video of the Year and Best Male Video, winning the latter. It won Video of the Year at the 2005 BET Awards. The music video earned two nominations for Best Male Video and Best Hip-Hop Video at the 2005 MTV Video Music Awards Japan. "Jesus Walks" was nominated for Best International Video at the 2004 MuchMusic Video Awards. The music video received three nominations at the 2005 Music Video Production Awards, for Best Cinematography, Best Editing and Best Hip-Hop Video. At the 2005 Soul Train Music Awards "Jesus Walks" was nominated for Video of the Year. The video earned a nomination for Outstanding Music Video at the 2005 NAACP Image Awards.

== Live performances ==
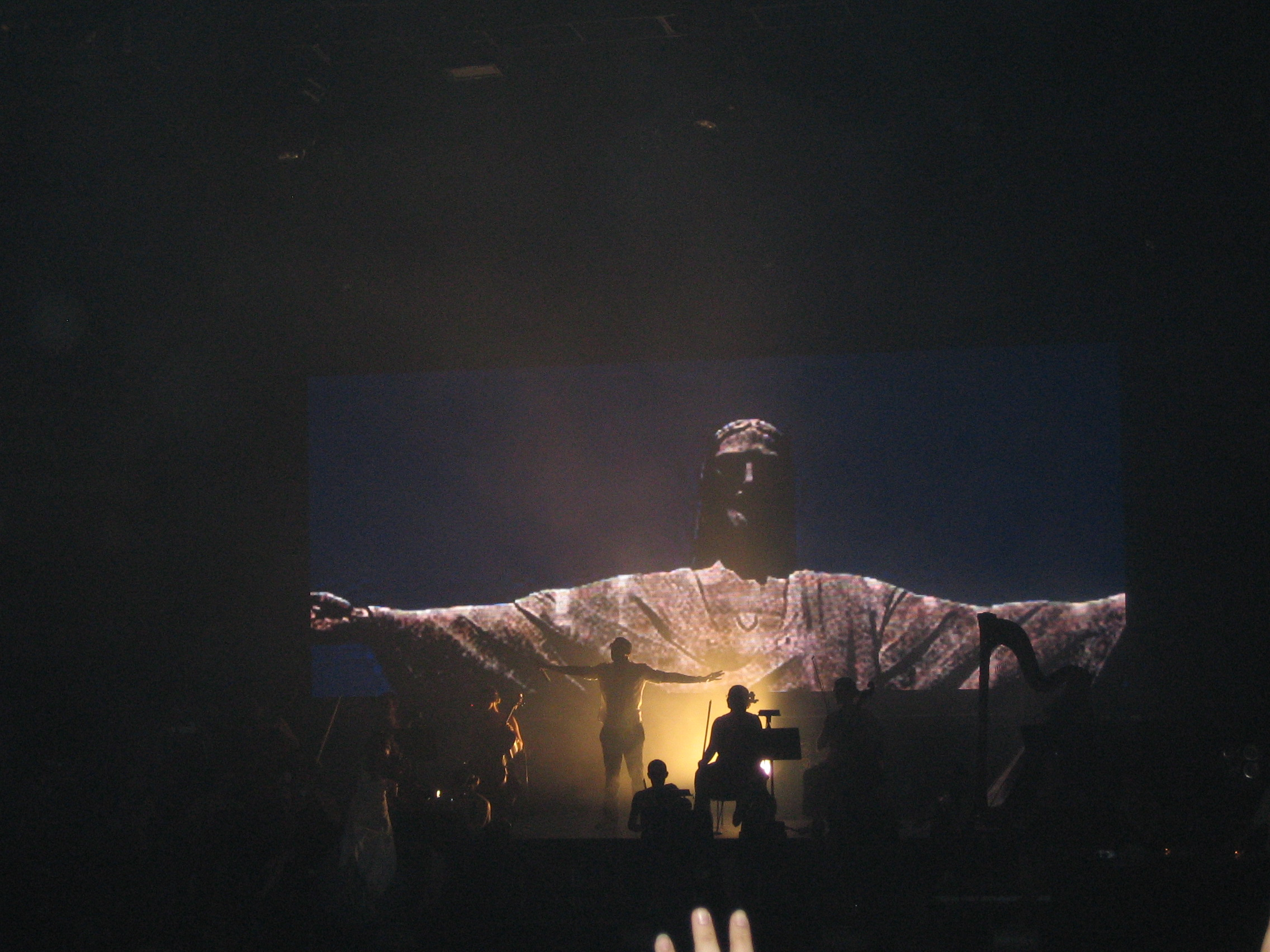
Kanye West performing "Jesus Walks" at the Sydney Opera House in Sydney, Australia on April 2, 2006.

Thanks to its fervid sound and widespread popularity, "Jesus Walks" has since become a crowd favorite and Kanye West has performed it on numerous occasions around the globe. West included the song within the set list of his School Spirit Tour that took place in early 2004. An early live performance of the song occurred in his hometown of Chicago at a concert with Dilated Peoples held in the House of Blues on May 5, 2004. West provided a performance of "Jesus Walks" for the opening of the 2004 BET Awards, in which he stood behind a pulpit and was accompanied by a choir, drumline and gospel singer Yolanda Adams. While serving as the opening act for Usher's The Truth Tour, West performed "Jesus Walks" as his finale. West opened the 2004 MTV Video Music Awards with a theatrical performance of "Jesus Walks." He led a 32-member choir around an arena filled with audience members holding artificial candles and had stained glass windows descend from the ceiling as he joined John Legend, Chaka Khan, and Syleena Johnson onstage. During his appearance at Dave Chapelle's Block Party in September, West performed "Jesus Walks" accompanied by a Central State University marching band. He provided a performance of "Jesus Walks" during his brief appearance at Brixton Academy in London on November 24.

West performed "Jesus Walks" at the 47th Grammy Awards ceremony just prior to his receipt of the award for Best Rap Album. This performance, which featured West's mother Donda West, was joined in a sequence with Mavis Staples and John Legend's rendition of "I'll Take You There" and a performance of "I'll Fly Away" by the Blind Boys of Alabama. At the conclusion, the performers encircled and covered West, who eventually emerged donning an all-white suit with large angelic wings. That July, West played the song during his set at a Live 8 show held in Philadelphia's Museum of Art, where he was backed by an eleven-piece female string orchestra decked out in black masks and garments. As he played, Will Smith and DJ Jazzy Jeff danced to the song backstage. Accompanied by a seventeen-piece, all-female string orchestra, West performed "Jesus Walks" live for an exclusive concert held at Abbey Road Studios in London, England on September 21. The performance was recorded and later released on a live album entitled Late Orchestration. West included "Jesus Walks" within the setlist of his Touch the Sky Tour that took place in late 2005. He performed the song at Santa Monica High School for a concert promoting higher education sponsored by his charity foundation.

Wearing a Detroit Pistons jacket, West performed the song for a pre-game concert held during VH1's Pepsi Smash Super Bowl Bash on February 2, 2006. He played "Jesus Walks" near the end of his concert at the Hammersmith Apollo in London on February 12. The following week, West performed the song once again at the Manchester MEN Arena with DJ A-Trak, two backing vocalists, a nine-piece female string orchestra and a harpist. The performance concluded by displaying an image of the Cristo de la Concordia on a gigantic monitor. West played "Jesus Walks" during his appearance at the first day of Coachella 2006 in Indio, California, where he later on had A-Trak spin A-Ha's "Take On Me" while he danced onstage to the delight of the audience. On June 22, West performed the song while attending a benefit held in New York staged for the non-profit Foundation for AIDS Research.

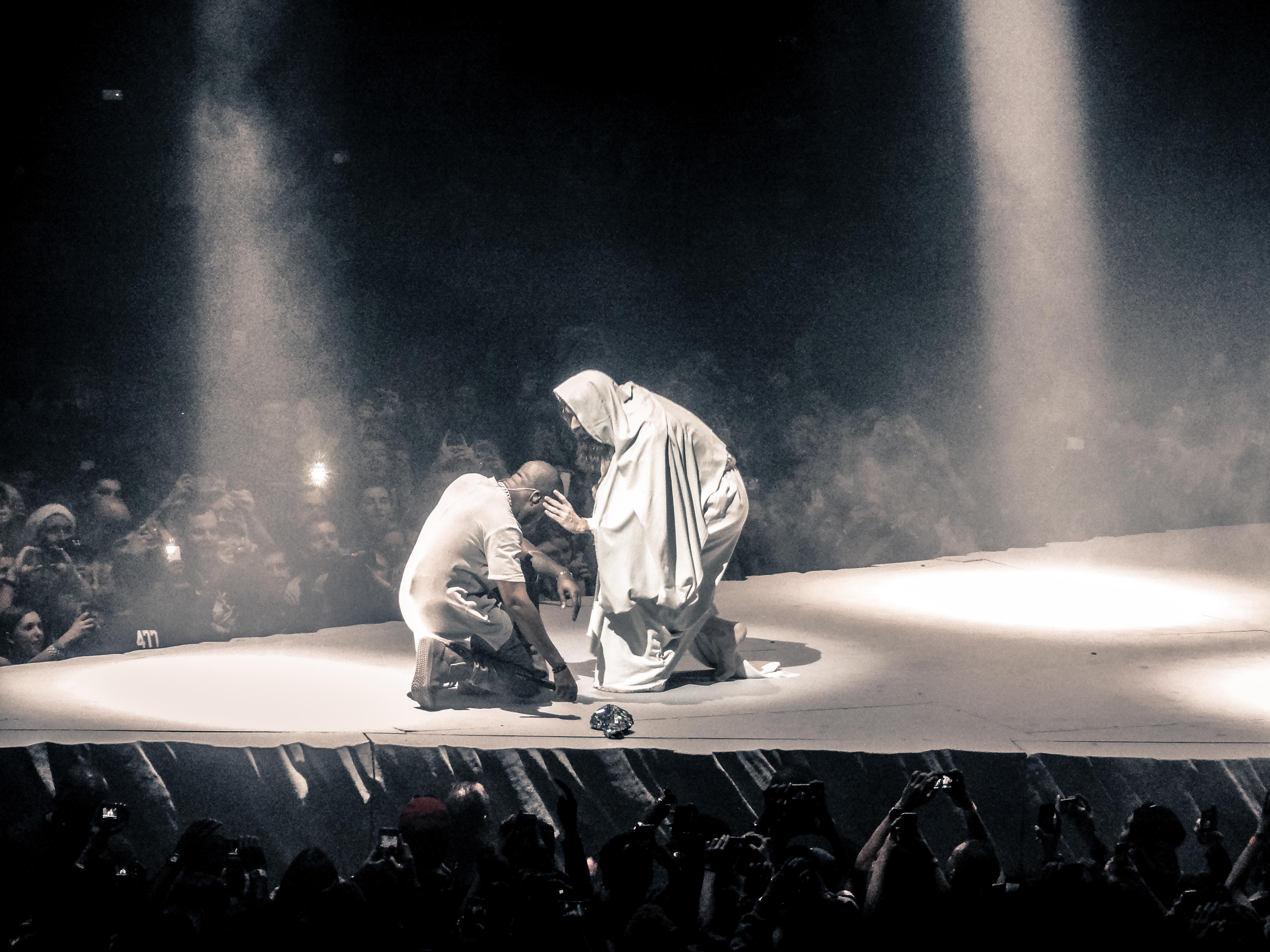
Kanye West preparing to perform "Jesus Walks" at Air Canada Centre on December 23, 2013, in Toronto, Canada on the Yeezus Tour.

Kanye provided a performance of the song during his set at Live Earth 2007, before joining The Police and John Mayer onstage to perform "Message in a Bottle" for the concert's finale. West performed "Jesus Walks" live for the Concert for Diana held at Wembley Stadium on July 1, 2007, to a crowd of over 63,000 people. An estimated 500 million people watched the event in over 140 countries worldwide. The very next day, West performed the song as the finale of his gig at the Manchester Apollo for the Manchester International Festival. "Jesus Walks" was included within the setlist of West's conceptual Glow in the Dark Tour that first took off in late 2007. During the concert, an LCD screen seated behind him displayed a skyline filled with lightning bolts while fumes billowed from the stage on the hook. That August, West played "Jesus Walks" at the Exdo Event Center in Denver for a private show at held for Bono's humanitarian organization ONE. West gave a performance of "Jesus Walks" before an audience of 3,000 students during his free Stay In School benefit concert at Chicago Theatre on July 11, 2009. He performed the song in Hyde Park, London while headlining the second and final day of the 2009 Wireless Festival.

== Legacy and impact ==
"Jesus Walks" has been credited with helping to abate the antagonistic gap that once separated mainstream rap music and the religious church. Since then, countless ministries began to embrace hip-hop and incorporate the musical genre into their gospel services. In her biographical book, Kanye's mother Donda West recalled an instance where over three hundred adolescents “gave their lives to Christ” the night her son performed the song at a youth revival center. Darryl McDaniels of the groundbreaking hip-hop group Run-DMC told Time magazine that he had grown indifferent towards contemporary rap music and ceased listening to it until he heard "Jesus Walks". The song was used in the trailer, as well as the credits of the 2005 Gulf War film Jarhead. "Jesus Walks" was featured in the AMC series "‘Hip Hop: The Songs That Shook America", a six part documentary series that focused on a groundbreaking song each episode.

== Track listings ==
US Promo single

1. "Jesus Walks" (Main) – 3:13
2. "Jesus Walks" (Clean) – 3:13

US 12" single

A-Side

1. "Jesus Walks" (Clean) – 3:13
2. "Jesus Walks" (Dirty) – 3:13
3. "Jesus Walks" (A cappella) – 3:09

B-Side

1. "Heavy Hitters" (Clean) – 3:00
2. "Heavy Hitters" (Dirty) – 3:01
3. "Heavy Hitters" (A cappella) – 3:00

Australia CD single

1. "Jesus Walks" (Album version) – 3:20
2. "Jesus Walks" (Live) – 4:06
3. "Through the Wire" (Live) – 4:23
4. "Jesus Walks" (Mase remix) – 6:26
5. "Jesus Walks" (Church version) – 3:59

UK CD single

1. "Jesus Walks" (Album version) – 3:21
2. "Jesus Walks" (Live in Paridiso 2004) – 4:07
3. "Through the Wire" (Live in Paridiso 2004) – 4:23
4. "Jesus Walks" (Mase remix) – 3:52
5. "Jesus Walks" (Video version 2) – 4:06
6. "Jesus Walks" (Video version 3) – 4:18

UK Promo single

1. "Jesus Walks (Clean) – 3:20
2. "Jesus Walks (12" Version) – 3:20
3. "Jesus Walks (A Capella) – 3:09
4. "Breathe In Breathe Out (Edited) – 4:06
5. "Breathe In Breathe Out (Explicit) – 4:06

Live Digital single

1. "Jesus Walks" (Live) – 3:31

== Charts ==
=== Weekly charts ===
Chart (2004–05)	Peak position
Australia (ARIA)	37
Australian Urban (ARIA)	10
Ireland (IRMA)	18
Scottish Singles Sales (Official Charts)	30
UK Singles (Official Charts)	16
UK Hip Hop/R&B (Official Charts)	6
US Billboard Hot 100	11
US Hot R&B/Hip-Hop Songs (Billboard)	2
US Hot Rap Tracks (Billboard)	3
US Rhythmic Airplay (Billboard)	16

=== Year-end charts ===
Chart (2004)	Position
UK Urban (Music Week)	39
US Billboard Hot 100	43
US Hot R&B/Hip-Hop Songs (Billboard)	7

== Certifications ==
Region	Certification	Certified units/sales
Denmark (IFPI Danmark)	Gold	45,000^{‡}
New Zealand (RMNZ)	Platinum	30,000^{‡}
United Kingdom (BPI)	Platinum	600,000^{‡}
United States (RIAA)	3× Platinum	3,000,000^{‡}
^{‡} Sales+streaming figures based on certification alone.

== Release history ==
Region	Date	Format(s)	Label(s)	Ref.
United States	April 12, 2004	Rhythmic contemporary · urban contemporary radio	Roc-A-Fella, IDJMG	

== Personnel ==
Information taken from The College Dropout liner notes.

- Songwriters: Kanye West, Che Smith
- Record producer: Kanye West
- Recorder: Tasuya Sato, Andrew Dawson, Eugene A. Toale
- Recording Engineer: Marc Fuller
- Mix engineer: Manny Marroquin
- Additional vocals: John Legend
- Violin: Miri Ben-Ari
- Choir arranger: Curtis Lundy

== Remix ==
"Jesus Walks (Remix)"

Song by Kanye West featuring Mase and Common

from the album The College Dropout Video Anthology
- Released: March 22, 2005
- Recorded: 2004
- Genre: Hip hop
- Length: 4:58
- Label: Roc-A-Fella; Def Jam
- Songwriters: Kanye West; Mason Betha; Lonnie Lynn
- Producer: West

The official remix of "Jesus Walks" was released on a bonus CD within his The College Dropout Video Anthology compilation DVD in 2005, which was recorded in 2004 and features both Mase and Common on it. At the time of the remix, Mase had recently come out of retirement from being a minister to deliver a new verse. He spoke positively of West following the collaboration, saying, "I appreciate people like [him], people that dare to be different. Hip-hop is supposed to be an avenue of expression, and people are supposed to be able to express what they feel, what they believe." It was originally included on The College Dropout Video Anthology, released on the 22nd of March, 2005, through Roc-A-Fella Records and Def Jam Recordings. It would later be included on the Japanese special edition of The College Dropout, released that same year.
