= Spaceship (Kanye West song) =

Song by Kanye West featuring GLC and Consequence

from the album The College Dropout
- Released: February 10, 2004
- Recorded: December 2003 – January 2004
- Studio: Sony Music Studios (New York, New York); Larrabee Sound North (Los Angeles, California)
- Genre: Hip-hop
- Length: 5:24
- Label: Roc-A-Fella; Def Jam
- Songwriters: Kanye West; Leonard Harris; Dexter Mills; Marvin Gaye; Gwen Fuqua; Sandra Greene
- Producer: West

"Spaceship" is a song by American musician Kanye West, featuring fellow American rappers GLC and Consequence, taken from West's debut studio album The College Dropout (2004). It was scheduled to be released as the album's sixth and final single, but this plan ended up being cancelled. The music video was released in June 2009. "Spaceship II" and "Spaceship III" were released by Alex Wiley in 2013 and 2017 respectively.

== Composition ==
The track contains a sample of the recording "Distant Lover" by Marvin Gaye. The Verge interpreted this sample as using soothing tones to keep "Spaceship" down to earth, even when it gets aggressive. West's presence on the chorus marks one of the earliest moments of him singing within his career. When West raps about working a job at the Gap formerly in "Spaceship", the story being told in the verse is actually true.

== Release ==
The song was originally scheduled to be a GLC track produced by West, until West played it to Plain Pat, who insisted on him putting it on the album. It was swapped for "Good, Bad, Ugly" as the position of number six from the original track list to the final.

The track was originally supposed to be released as the sixth and final single from The College Dropout, but this plan was cancelled due to West's label moving on to promotion for his second studio album Late Registration (2005) instead of following through with the release of it as a single.

== Critical reception ==
Paul Cantor of Billboard had praise for the Gaye sample, describing it as being "the backdrop for Kanye and his comrades to detail needing day jobs to finance their rapping dreams". The opinion was voiced by J-23 of HipHopDX regarding "Spaceship" that it "has to be the best of the additions, if not the best of the album".

HotNewHipHop placed the track at number 35 on their list of West's 50 best songs. When ranking his 25 best verses of all time, Complex positioned West's "Spaceship" verse at number 18.

== Music video ==
On June 1, 2009, GLC posted the previously unreleased music video on his blog and called himself, West and Consequence "young dreamers". West also shared it to his blog two days later and revealed that he wasn't satisfied with the video when he directed it four years ago, but West decided that after looking back at it in 2009, he liked it. A music video was shot back in 2005 because the track was originally scheduled to be released as the sixth and final single from the featuring album. The video stars West as a worker in a mall, with GLC playing the role of a co-worker and Consequence playing that of a customer.

On June 26, 2020, West posted the video on his website in celebration of the announcement of his clothing brand Yeezy's 10-year collaboration deal with The Gap.

== Legacy ==
Vibe listed "Spaceship" among West's most revolutionary songs in December 2013, nearly ten years after The College Dropout had been released.

On June 4, 2013, Alex Wiley released "Spaceship II", featuring Chance the Rapper and GLC, in tribute to the original. Consequence revisited it on March 1, 2017, with "Spaceship III", featuring Chance the Rapper, Alex Wiley, GLC & Chuck Inglish.

== Personnel ==
Information taken from The College Dropout liner notes.

- Songwriters: Kanye West, Leonard Harris, Dexter Mills, Marvin Gaye, Gwen Gordy Fuqua, Sandra Greene
- Record producer: Kanye West
- Recorders: Tasuya Sato, Andrew Dawson, Rabeka Tunei
- Mix engineer: Manny Marroquin
- Additional vocals: Tony Williams, John Legend
