= GLC (rapper) =

American rapper from Chicago (born 1977)

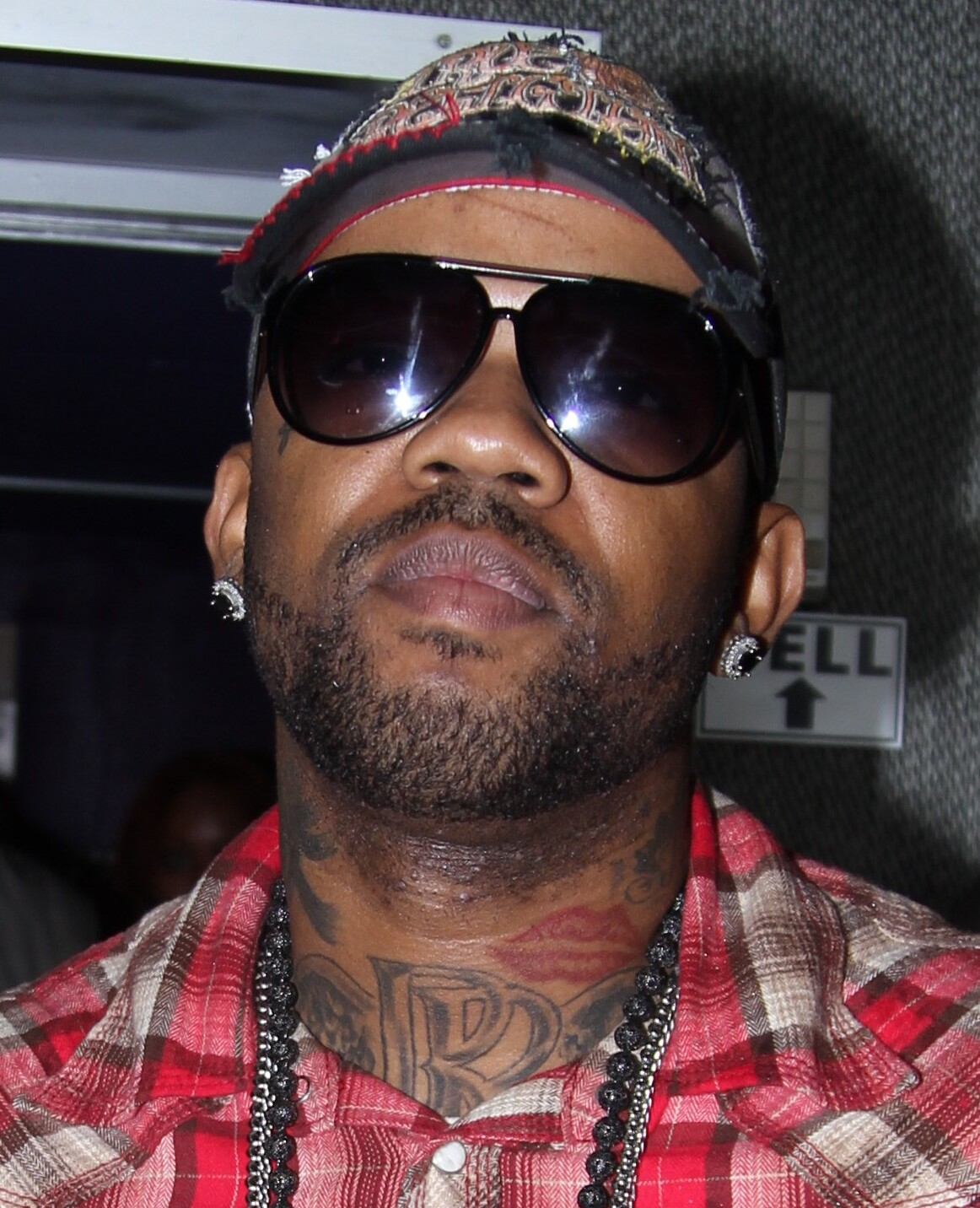
- GLC in 2011

Background information
- Born: Leonard Harris; December 6, 1977 (age 48); Chicago, Illinois, U.S.
- Genres: Midwestern hip-hop
- Occupation: Rapper
- Years active: 1996–present
- Labels: Sony BMG; GOOD Music
- Formerly of: Go-Getters
- Website: glctheism.com

Leonard Harris (born December 6, 1977), better known by his stage name GLC (short for Gangsta Legendary Crisis), is an American rapper from Chicago, Illinois. He was formerly a member of the Go-Getters.

GLC is featured on "Spaceship" from Kanye West's album The College Dropout (2004), as well as "Drive Slow" from Late Registration (2005). In 2010, GLC released his debut solo studio album, Love, Life & Loyalty.

== Discography ==
=== Studio albums ===
- Love, Life & Loyalty (2010)

=== Singles ===
- "Gone" (2014)
- "Malcolm X" (2014)
- "Coolout" (2016)
- "The Flow" (2017)

=== Guest appearances ===
List of non-single guest appearances, with other performing artists, showing year released and album name
Title	Year	Other artist(s)	Album
"Encore"	2003	Jay-Z	The Black Album
"Spaceship"	2004	Kanye West Consequence	The College Dropout
"Drive Slow"	2005	Kanye West, Paul Wall	Late Registration
"Let's Get It Poppin'"	2006	Various Artists	MTV: My Block Chicago
"Disperse"	2008	Consequence, Really Doe	Don't Quit Your Day Job!
"Fabrics"	2009	Really Doe, Malik Yusef	First Impressions
"Real Live"	2010	Bun B	Trill OG
"Mirrors" (Remix)	2010	XV, Mike Posner, Bun B	Vizzy Zone
"The End"	2010	Kid Cudi	Man on the Moon II: The Legend of Mr. Rager
"Perfect Ten"	2010	Cory Mo, Slim Thug, CP	It's Been About Time
"Let the Pimpin' Commence"	2010	Cory Mo, Mistah F.A.B.	It's Been About Time
"Classic Life"	2011	Kenwood, Blk Soldier	The Goodest Vol 3
"Blame Yourself"	2011	XV, Emilio Rojas, Casey	—N/a
"Poe Man's Dreams (His Vice)"	2011	Kendrick Lamar	Section.80
"Not The One"	2012	The World Famous Tony Williams	Some of My Best Rappers Are Friends
"The Hood"	2012	BBU	Bell Hooks
"Celebration of Life Illz" (Remix)	2012	Neak, Lungz	Love Greater // The Prequel
"Incredible"	2012	Kydd	Sounds in My Head 2
"Lone Star"	2012	Jon Connor, Bun B	While You Were Sleeping
"You Don't Know"	2012	JNan, Kanye West	Fast Food
"Already"	2012	JNan	Fast Food
"Pimpin'"	2012	Boaz, Chevy Woods	Bases Loaded
"Russian Roulette"	2012	Kydd	The Righteous LP
"Seen This Before"	2012	Fly Union	Value Pack 7 (Zenith)
"Yo Bitch Choose Me"		Cory Mo, Bun B	Country Rap Tunes 2
"Rise"	2013	Rudy G	—N/a
"Cadillac Gangsta"	2013	Local-MU12 (TJ, Son-Ray, & RP)	—N/a
"Windows Down"	2014	Ether Q	Windy City Diary
