= Through the Wire =

Single by Kanye West

from the album The College Dropout and the mixtape Get Well Soon
- B-side: "Two Words"
- Released: September 30, 2003
- Recorded: November 2002
- Studio: The Record Plant (Los Angeles, California)
- Genre: Hip hop; chipmunk soul
- Length: 3:41 (album version); 4:34 (single version)
- Label: Roc-A-Fella; Def Jam
- Songwriters: Kanye West; Tom Keane; Cynthia Weil; David Foster
- Producer: Kanye West

Kanye West singles chronology
"Welcome 2 Chicago" (2002)	"Through the Wire" (2003)	"Slow Jamz" (2003)

Music video
- "Through the Wire" on YouTube

"Through the Wire" is the debut solo single by American rapper and producer Kanye West, who wrote and recorded the song with his jaw wired shut after a car crash on October 23, 2002. The song prominently samples (and its title is a play on) Chaka Khan's 1985 single "Through the Fire", and thus, Tom Keane of The Keane Brothers, Cynthia Weil, and David Foster, who wrote "Through the Fire", earn writing credits. The song was recorded at the Record Plant in Los Angeles, California, and is a hip-hop track with West's then-signature chipmunk soul style. The track is about West's then-recent car accident, with West using the "Through the Fire" sample as a way to reference the impact, specifically his jaw being wired shut.

The song was originally released as "Through the Wire (Still Standing)" on West's debut mixtape Get Well Soon..., released before the single, on December 14, 2002. The mixtape version also features an outro sampled from Elton John's "I'm Still Standing", representing his hope after the accident and partially giving the song its title. As such, when the sample was removed, so was the sample's mention in the title of the track. The song was then most famously released on September 30, 2003, as the lead single and nineteenth track from his debut studio album, The College Dropout (2004), backed with fellow album track "Two Words". The single was specifically released through Roc-A-Fella Records and Def Jam Recordings.

Upon its release, "Through the Wire" received near-universal acclaim from music critics and peaked at number 15 on the Billboard Hot 100, staying on the charts for a total of twenty-one weeks. It also charted in the top 10 on three other charts in the United States and one in the United Kingdom, the latter being its highest position, a peak at number 3 on the UK Hip Hop and R&B Singles and Albums Charts. The track was also certified Platinum by the Recording Industry Association of America (RIAA) and the British Phonographic Industry (BPI) respectively, alongside certifying Gold in Denmark. The song was nominated for a Grammy Award, specifically for Best Rap Solo Performance, in 2005, but lost to Roc-A-Fella co-head Jay-Z's "99 Problems". The music video was financed by West, who was inspired by an Adidas advertisement. The video would end up winning Video of the Year at the 2004 Source Hip Hop Awards.

== Background ==
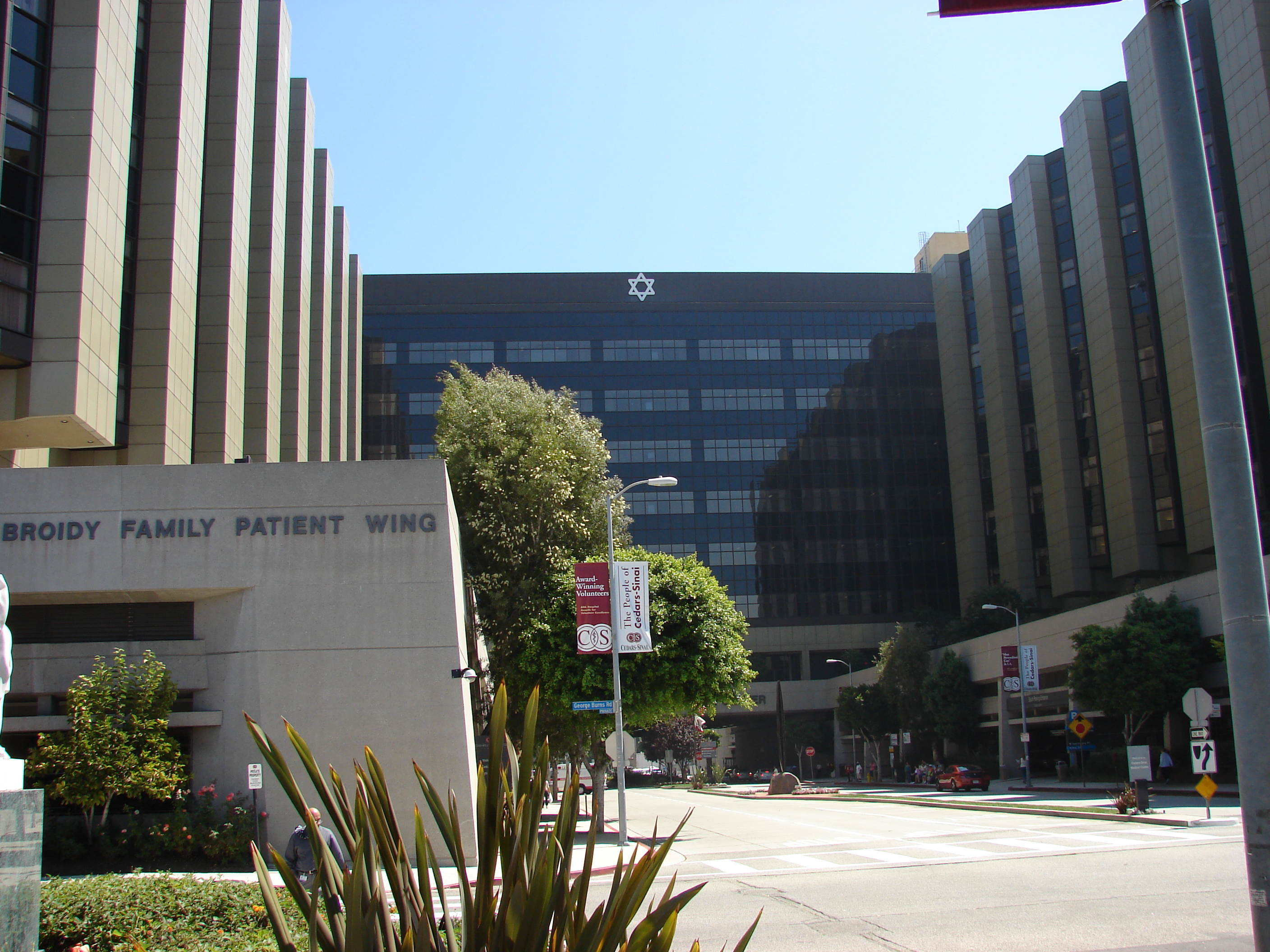
Cedars-Sinai Medical Center (pictured), where West was transported after his car accident.

On October 23, 2002, West was in a California recording studio producing music for Beanie Sigel, Peedi Crakk, and The Black Eyed Peas. After leaving the studio at around 3 a.m. in his rented Lexus, he had a near-fatal crash when he had fallen asleep at the wheel. He was taken to Cedars-Sinai Medical Center, mentioned in the song as "the same hospital where Biggie Smalls died", and had his jaw wired to his face in reconstructive surgery. Two weeks after being admitted to the hospital, he recorded the song at the Record Plant Studios with his jaw still wired shut. Consequence recalls that West started rapping the lyrics to the song three days after the crash.

The song's title refers to the wires used to hold his broken jaw together, as well as being a play on the song "Through the Fire", which it samples. When asked about how the incident changed his music, West stated:

Well, the only thing this accident's is saying is, "I am about to hand you the world, just know at any given time I can take it away from you." To nearly lose your life, to nearly lose your mouth, your voice, your whole face, as a rapper...and I had to be on TV! My face looks crazy to me now... But I have to just thank God for the situation that I am in... "Through The Wire" is the worst thing that could've possibly happened to me, and now it's obviously the best thing. Look how it exploded!

The song originally appeared on West's mixtape Get Well Soon... as "Through the Wire (Still Standing)" where his wired jaw was incredibly noticeable, and also including an outro that is sampled from Elton John's hit "I'm Still Standing", before being re-recorded and released as the first single from The College Dropout in late 2003. Although he initially had trouble convincing Roc-A-Fella Records executives to let him make his own album as a rapper, he was able to change their minds after the song's release.

== Composition ==
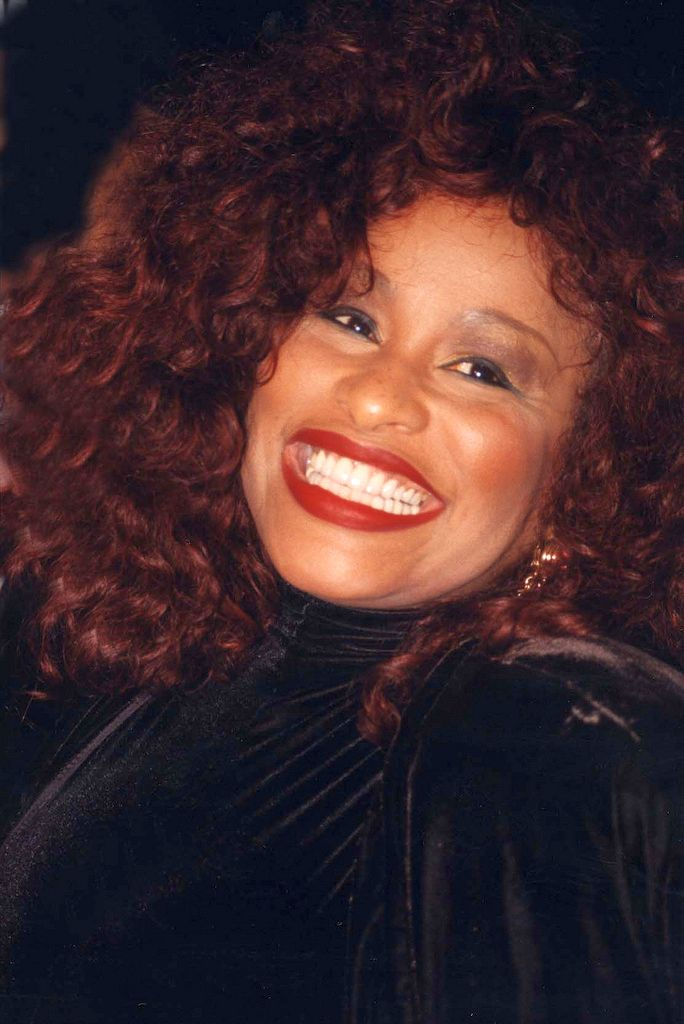
The song features a sample of "Through the Fire" by Chaka Khan, who provided clearance after she saw its music video via her son and she was appreciative of the sample.

"Through the Wire"
"Through the Wire" is representative of his production style, in which he samples and speeds up sections from classic soul records and uses them to create melodic hooks. The song's hook primarily samples Chaka Khan's 1984 hit "Through the Fire".

"Through the Wire" was inspired by the 2002 car crash, and West has provided a comedic account of his difficult recovery. West samples a pitch-shifted and sped up version of Chaka Khan's 1985 single "Through the Fire". Coodie, one of the music video's directors, reported that Khan wouldn't initially allow the sample to be cleared until the video was shown to her son and he told Khan about it, leading to the sample being cleared about two weeks later. Khan later expressed her love for the track, calling West a "sweetheart, truly adorable" and the way he used the sample "so clever". However, in June 2019, Khan criticized West's unorthodox, highly pitchshifted use of the sample, calling it "stupid". Khan did not receive writing credit for the song, which instead went to David Foster, Tom Keane, and Cynthia Weil, who wrote "Through the Fire". IGN described West's rapping as "a Snoop-meets-Hova flow, twisting up his words with the patented 'izz' inflection."

== Release and reception ==
Dave Heaton of PopMatters called it "as riveting and moving as everyone says it is" and it "may be the album's most startling personal horror story (though it's also a song of hope and gratitude)". AllMusic's Andy Kellman said it was "a daring way to introduce himself to the masses as an MC" and it "couldn't have forged his dual status as underdog and champion any better." Kellman described the content as "heartbreaking and hysterical" and that despite his "inevitable slur, his words ring loud and clear".

The New York Times' Kelefa Sanneh described him as "a wounded hero beating the odds", and it "gave him a chance to prove that he was the exception to the rule that producers can't rap." Stylus Magazine called it "a poignant, pop-culture-packed account of Kanye's near-fatal run-in with Chaka Khan". By rapping with his jaw sewed up, The Source noted that West used "the element of surprise to his advantage". HipHopDX listed the track as one of "the classics that created" the album's hype, and Pitchfork Media stated it was "chock-full-of-clever". Vibe magazine wrote that "West's sideways approach to music making stands out" on the track and the "raw, teeth-clenching narrative falls in line with his gutwrenching soul beats." At the 2005 Grammy Awards, the track was nominated for Best Rap Solo Performance, which was won by Jay-Z's "99 Problems". The track was one of the Award Winning Songs at the 2005 BMI R&B/Hip-Hop Awards.

As West's debut single, "Through the Wire" has been recognized as a jump-start for his career after the song was played on MTV. Director for the music video, Coodie, would say, "The night of when he did the 'Through the Wire' premiere party at 40-40 Club, that was the night that was like, 'Oh shit.' That's when Def Jam started recognizing him. Everybody was blown away by the video and it just kept building from there. Then after that show on SOBs on October 1st, he was bonafide. He was popping. It was full-on Kanye season." Consequence would say to Complex on The College Dropout's 10th anniversary, "The accident wound up being a blessing for him. Whatever diction issues he had, he came through with a super clear voice. That was like one of those pressure bursts pipes things." In 2010 and 2013, Complex would name "Through the Wire" the 10th best rap song from Chicago. Pitchfork included the song in The Pitchfork 500, a 2008 guide to the 500 greatest songs from punk to the present, while Rolling Stone ranked the song at number fourteen on a list of the 100 Greatest Debut Singles of All Time in 2020.

== Commercial performance ==
"Through the Wire" debuted at number ninety-four on the Billboard Hot 100 and peaked at number fifteen for five weeks. It remained on the chart for twenty-one weeks. It performed better on the urban contemporary charts, reaching number eight on the Hot R&B/Hip-Hop Singles & Tracks and number four on the Hot Rap Tracks. In the United Kingdom, it debuted at number nine on the UK Singles Chart where it peaked for two weeks and exited the chart after nine weeks. The track charted lower in other European countries, where it reached the top thirty in Ireland, Sweden, and the Netherlands, the top fifty in Belgium and Switzerland, and number sixty-one in Germany. The maximum peak time in those countries lasted one week. The single entered the New Zealand Singles Chart at number twenty-four and peaked at number sixteen.

On July 14, 2017, "Through the Wire" was certified Silver in the UK, nearly fourteen years after the single's release. It was certified Gold on September 10, 2021, over 4 years later and almost 18 years after its initial release. The single was certified Platinum in the US on November 20, 2018, fifteen years after its release.

== Music video ==
The music video was directed by Coodie and Chike, and it premiered on August 3, 2003. It is a slideshow of videos and pictures of West producing and his crash seen through the frames of Polaroid pictures. West, who financed the video, conceived ideas for the clip after seeing an Adidas advertisement in BlackBook magazine. He stated, "I don't like gettin' ideas from direct shit ... I like to pull ideas from all the way over here. Sometimes my vision can't be explained in words, 'cause I couldn't have even told you in words how I envisioned that video ending up." Chike recalled the making of the clip, saying, "one day Coodie calls me out the blue about a concept he and Kanye had for a video revolving around Polaroid snapshots. I was leaving work at 7 PM only to come back at 10 PM, work all night then go home at 7 AM". Coodie stated that "If we would have wrote a treatment" for the video, "they would have shot that down. They had to see it to understand. Otherwise they'd have said, 'No, Kanye should be rapping at a party, with lots of girls poolside'". It was awarded the Video of the Year at the 2004 Source Hip Hop Awards.

== Track listing ==
CD single

1. "Through the Wire"
2. "Through the Wire" (instrumental)
3. "Two Words" (main)
4. "Two Words" (clean)
5. "Two Words" (instrumental)

UK CD single

1. "Through the Wire" (radio edit)
2. "Two Words" (radio edit)
3. "Through the Wire" (instrumental)
4. "Through the Wire" (multimedia track)

== Personnel ==
Information adapted from The College Dropout liner notes.

- Songwriters: Kanye West, (Note: While he produced the backing track and wrote the rap for "Through the Wire", West did not receive writing credit for the song, which instead went to the composers of the sampled song "Through the Fire".) David Foster, Tom Keane, Cynthia Weil
- Record producer: Kanye West
- Recording engineer: Francis Graham
- Mix engineer: Manny Marroquin
- Bass guitar: Scott Ward

== Charts ==
=== Weekly charts ===
Weekly chart performance for "Through the Wire"
Chart (2003–2004)	Peak position
Australia (ARIA)	81
Australian Urban (ARIA)	25
Belgium (Ultratop 50 Wallonia)	48
Netherlands (Single Top 100)	23
Denmark (Tracklisten)	11
Germany (GfK)	61
Ireland (IRMA)	24
New Zealand (Recorded Music NZ)	16
Scottish Singles Sales (Official Charts)	18
Sweden (Sverigetopplistan)	27
Switzerland (Schweizer Hitparade)	48
UK Singles (Official Charts)	9
UK Hip Hop/R&B (Official Charts)	3
US Billboard Hot 100	15
US Hot R&B/Hip-Hop Songs (Billboard)	8
US Hot Rap Tracks (Billboard)	4
US Pop Songs (Billboard)	32

=== Year-end charts ===
Year-end chart performance for "Through the Wire"
Chart (2004)	Position
UK Singles (OCC)	103
UK Urban (Music Week) "Through the Wire" / "Two Words"	36
US Billboard Hot 100	61
US Hot R&B/Hip-Hop Songs (Billboard)	37

== Certifications ==
Region	Certification	Certified units/sales
Denmark (IFPI Danmark)	Gold	45,000^{‡}
New Zealand (RMNZ)	2× Platinum	60,000^{‡}
United Kingdom (BPI)	Platinum	600,000^{‡}
United States (RIAA)	3× Platinum	3,000,000^{‡}
^{‡} Sales+streaming figures based on certification alone.

== Release history ==
Region	Date	Format(s)	Label(s)	Ref.
United States	September 30, 2003	Digital download		
United States	March 1, 2004	Contemporary hit radio	Roc-A-Fella, IDJMG	
