= List of Billboard number-one R&B/hip-hop albums of 2007 =

This page lists the albums that reached number-one on the Top R&B/Hip-Hop Albums and Top Rap Albums charts in 2007. The Rap Albums chart partially serves as a distillation of rap-specific titles from the overall R&B/Hip-Hop Albums chart.

The best performing R&B/hip-hop album of the year was Kingdom Come by Jay-Z, which had topped both charts in December 2006.

== Chart history ==
Issue date	R&B/Hip-Hop Albums	Artist(s)	Rap Albums	Artist(s)	Refs.
January 6	Hip Hop Is Dead	Nas	Hip Hop Is Dead	Nas	
January 13	21	Omarion	Thug Motivation 102: The Inspiration	Young Jeezy	
January 20	Dreamgirls: Music from the Motion Picture	Soundtrack / Various artists	Thug Motivation 102: The Inspiration	Young Jeezy	
January 27	Dreamgirls: Music from the Motion Picture	Soundtrack / Various artists	Thug Motivation 102: The Inspiration	Young Jeezy	
February 3	Dreamgirls: Music from the Motion Picture	Soundtrack / Various artists	Thug Motivation 102: The Inspiration	Young Jeezy	
February 10	Late Night Special	Pretty Ricky	Late Night Special	Pretty Ricky	
February 17	The Evolution of Robin Thicke	Robin Thicke	Late Night Special	Pretty Ricky	
February 24	The Evolution of Robin Thicke	Robin Thicke	Late Night Special	Pretty Ricky	
March 3	In My Songs	Gerald Levert	Late Night Special	Pretty Ricky	
March 10	In My Songs	Gerald Levert	Late Night Special	Pretty Ricky	
March 17	The Evolution of Robin Thicke	Robin Thicke	We Got This	B.G. and the Chopper City Boyz	
March 24	Greatest Hits	The Notorious B.I.G.	Greatest Hits	The Notorious B.I.G.	
March 31	Luvanmusiq	Musiq Soulchild	Rich Boy	Rich Boy	
April 7	Veteran	Marques Houston	Rich Boy	Rich Boy	
April 14	Buck the World	Young Buck	Buck the World	Young Buck	
April 21	B'Day	Beyoncé	Get Money, Stay True	Paul Wall	
April 28	Buck the World	Young Buck	Buck the World	Young Buck	
May 5	Luvanmusiq	Musiq Soulchild	Buck the World	Young Buck	
May 12	Ain't Nothin' Like Me	Joe	Buck the World	Young Buck	
May 19	Because of You	Ne-Yo	Buck the World	Young Buck	
May 26	Special Occasion	Bobby Valentino	Strength & Loyalty	Bone Thugs-n-Harmony	
June 2	Sex, Love & Pain	Tank	Strength & Loyalty	Bone Thugs-n-Harmony	
June 9	Cold Summer: The Authorized Mixtape	U.S.D.A.	Cold Summer: The Authorized Mixtape	U.S.D.A.	
June 16	Double Up	R. Kelly	Cold Summer: The Authorized Mixtape	U.S.D.A.	
June 23	Epiphany	T-Pain	El Cartel: The Big Boss	Daddy Yankee	
June 30	From Nothin' to Somethin'	Fabolous	From Nothin' to Somethin'	Fabolous	
July 7	From Nothin' to Somethin'	Fabolous	From Nothin' to Somethin'	Fabolous	
July 14	Epiphany	T-Pain	From Nothin' to Somethin'	Fabolous	
July 21	T.I. vs. T.I.P.	T.I.	T.I. vs. T.I.P.	T.I.	
July 28	T.I. vs. T.I.P.	T.I.	T.I. vs. T.I.P.	T.I.	
August 4	T.I. vs. T.I.P.	T.I.	T.I. vs. T.I.P.	T.I.	
August 11	Planet Earth	Prince	T.I. vs. T.I.P.	T.I.	
August 18	Finding Forever	Common	Finding Forever	Common	
August 25	Underground Kingz	UGK	Underground Kingz	UGK	
September 1	Underground Kingz	UGK	Underground Kingz	UGK	
September 8	One Man Band Man	Swizz Beatz	One Man Band Man	Swizz Beatz	
September 15	Hustlenomics	Yung Joc	Hustlenomics	Yung Joc	
September 22	Hustlenomics	Yung Joc	Hustlenomics	Yung Joc	
September 29	Graduation	Kanye West	Graduation	Kanye West	
October 6	Graduation	Kanye West	Graduation	Kanye West	
October 13	Just Like You	Keyshia Cole	Graduation	Kanye West	
October 20	Back of My Lac'	J. Holiday	Souljaboytellem.com	Soulja Boy	
October 27	Just Like You	Keyshia Cole	Graduation	Kanye West	
November 3	The Art of Love & War	Angie Stone	Graduation	Kanye West	
November 10	Graduation	Kanye West	Graduation	Kanye West	
November 17	After Tonight	Will Downing	Supply & Demand	Playaz Circle	
November 24	American Gangster	Jay-Z	American Gangster	Jay-Z	
December 1	As I Am	Alicia Keys	American Gangster	Jay-Z	
December 8	As I Am	Alicia Keys	American Gangster	Jay-Z	
December 15	As I Am	Alicia Keys	American Gangster	Jay-Z	
December 22	As I Am	Alicia Keys	Made	Scarface	
December 29	As I Am	Alicia Keys	Face Off	Bow Wow and Omarion	

== See also ==
- 2007 in music
- 2007 in hip hop music
- List of number-one R&B singles of 2007 (U.S.)
- List of Billboard 200 number-one albums of 2007
