= Big Brother (Kanye West song) =

Song by Kanye West

from the album Graduation
- Released: September 11, 2007
- Studio: Doppler (Atlanta); Legacy Recording (NYC)
- Genre: Hip hop
- Length: 4:47
- Label: Roc-A-Fella; Def Jam
- Songwriters: Kanye West; Aldrin Davis
- Producer: Toomp

"Big Brother" is a song by American rapper Kanye West, released as the thirteenth track on his third studio album, Graduation (2007). West co-wrote the song with Toomp, who was the sole producer. It originally utilized Prince's "It's Gonna Be Lonely" for the beat, until he refused to approve, for full publishing and a re-recording was done instead. The song was written by West as a tribute to his close friend and mentor Jay-Z, who has shown his appreciation for it. West first teased the song in August 2007 for the BBC Radio 1Xtra event "Audience with Kanye West". A hip hop song with synths, it features a varied pace of rapping from West. In the lyrics, West introspectively examines the complexities of his friendship with Jay-Z.

"Big Brother" received generally positive reviews from music critics, who mostly lauded the theme. They often highlighted West's honesty and heavy detail, while some reviewers complimented the composition. Though not released as a single, the song peaked at number 19 on the US Billboard Bubbling Under R&B/Hip-Hop Singles chart. West first performed it at the Westminster Central Hall of Westminster, London in August 2007. During 2007, he and Jay-Z performed a rendition of the song and the latter's "Encore" on BET's 106 & Park, and JAM'N 94.5. Bobby Creekwater recorded a reinterpretation of the former in February 2009, dedicated to Eminem and their working relationship.

== Background ==
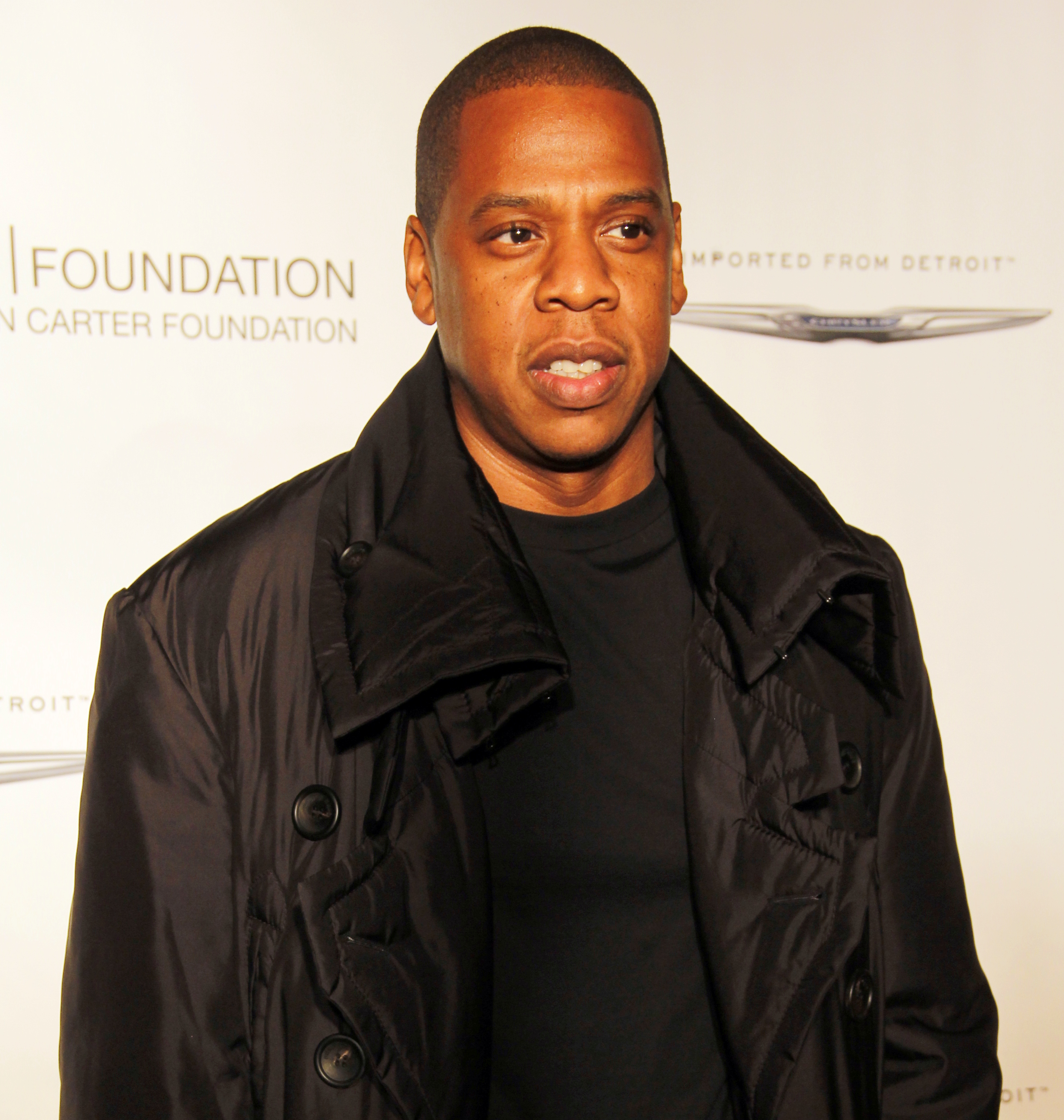
West wrote "Big Brother" as an ode to his close friendship with Jay-Z.

Record producer Toomp, who worked with Kanye West on fellow Graduation tracks "Good Life" and "Can't Tell Me Nothing", said that "Big Brother" was the final song the two recorded and the last to be mixed for the album. West repeatedly told him about a hook and a concept for the song, seeking a beat "with some real feel in it". He replayed the end part of Prince's 1979 track "It's Gonna Be Lonely" in the studio and made the beat in a day, impressing West and A&Rs from Def Jam. West then rapped over it, though Prince refused the usage of his music once the song was set to be mixed in New York and later changed his mind in favor of full publishing rights, which Toomp did not approve of. Toomp then remade the beat in Atlanta, re-arranging certain notes and crafting a new melody. Back in New York, West synced his vocals again with the new track, with the final product impressing listeners. Toomp served as the sole producer, making "Big Brother" the only track on Graduation, and one of the few in West's entire career, not to have his production. He co-wrote the song with Toomp as a tribute to his mentor and fellow rapper Jay-Z, whom he has felt so close to as a friend that he sees him as a brother. In January 2012, soul singer Tony Williams shared unreleased footage of West playing "Big Brother" to Jay-Z for the first time. Jay-Z became emotional after realizing he was the subject. The rapper said that he thought the song was "brilliantly written" and West's best work since "Jesus Walks" (2004), in terms of structure, emotion, and other factors. He further explained that working with West has "always been a big brother thing and a respect thing".

The song's hook and concept was conceived by West on an elevator ride. Toomp compared the song's theme to his relationship with rapper T.I., with it attracting much discussion. Jay-Z responded to this by thinking if it is "good or bad" and the rapper later felt excited to be in the studio with him, and was proud to witness the theme. Digital radio station BBC Radio 1Xtra hosted an exclusive "Audience with Kanye West" event on August 14, 2007, at the BBC Radio Music Theatre. West guided a specially chosen audience through Graduation, expressing that it is a career-defining record and "Big Brother" is his strongest track ever lyrically. On August 28, 2007, DJ Tim Westwood played a preview of the song for his show 'In New Music We Trust'. "Big Brother" was first unveiled in full at a secret concert West held with Rihanna for around 500 fans during his trip to the United Kingdom, standing among the multiple songs he debuted in the country. The concert took place on August 20, 2007, at the Westminster Central Hall in Westminster, London. West played a snippet of the song while hosting a listening session for the album on August 28, at the New World Stages in Detroit. In an interview with Blender, R&B singer-songwriter The-Dream said that he was set to sing on a remix of "Big Brother".

== Composition and lyrics ==
"Big Brother"
A 29-second sample of "Big Brother", featuring West rapping in a slow style about his admiration for Jay-Z over synths.

Musically, "Big Brother" is a mid-tempo hip hop song. It features synths, similar to those of fellow album track "I Wonder". Throughout the song, West raps in a rawer style than most of his work. His rapping pace varies from a swift delivery typical of hip hop to a slower style reminiscent of spoken word, accompanied by soft harmonies.

The lyrics of "Big Brother" possess an honest, heartfelt examination of the complexities of West's relationship with Jay-Z. West uses introspection to speak of their relationship, conveying emotion. He narrates the highs and lows, recalling his lifelong admiration for Jay-Z and a rivalry they had. As the song nears its conclusion, West expresses this admiration by altering the chorus to "My big brother was Big's brother/So here's a few words from ya kid brother/If you admire somebody you should go head and tell 'em/People never get the flowers while they can still smell 'em". West also uses the chorus as a subsidiary dedication to his former mentor No I.D., who first taught him how to produce music. West later ends the song with “Let the story end…Toomp killed this”, referring to DJ Toomp’s production and the story where he tells about him and Jay-Z’s friendship abruptly ends.

== Release and reception ==
"Big Brother" was released as the thirteenth and final track on West's third studio album Graduation on September 11, 2007. The song was met with generally positive reviews from music critics, who mostly appreciated the subject matter. Greg Kot from the Chicago Tribune declared that "West is at his best" on the song as he owns "his flaws rather than brushing past them", paying tribute to Jay-Z while recalling "the slights and embarrassments he suffered at his hands". Kot also pointed it out as the album's only instance of the music feeling "strictly like a backdrop, a gray wash that exists solely to frame West's rap". Expressing a similar sentiment, NOW Magazine's Jason Richards lauded West's "acute honesty" throughout the song as he "narrates the highs and lows" of his relationship with Jay-Z. Entertainment Weekly critic Neil Drumming wrote that the song's focus on their "strained relationship" is a "somber, self-critical" earnest moment, which "can't come soon enough". Jesal 'Jay Soul' Padania of RapReviews said that by going over the highs and lows of the relationship over the years, it creates "a fascinating episode of fly-on-the-wall reality" and focused particularly on the reference to Martin. At USA Today, Brett Johnson called the song captivating and noted West's boldness to "bite the hand th[at] feeds him" by detailing the relationship.

Making note of its "classic hip-hop storytelling framework" about Jay-Z and the "raw style" of West's rapping, Dave Heaton from PopMatters cited "Big Brother" as one of the tracks on Graduation that give off a "timeless hip-hop feeling". In 2008, Maddy Costa for The Guardian included the track within a "Readers Recommend" column that discussed hero worship, writing, "Kanye West demonstrates more self-awareness in his thoughtful tribute to his brother-in-spirit, Jay-Z, exploring the complications of their fan-idol relationship, which grows trickier as the two become peers." Writing for Pitchfork, Mark Pytlik thought that West comes close to "the mental hand-wringing of his early albums" with the subject matter. Hillary Crosley of Billboard asserted that the lyrics about Jay-Z are "introspective enough to make fans cry"; Rolling Stone's Austin Scaggs similarly called the song a "a tear-jerking ode" to the rapper. The Guardian critic Dorian Lynskey remarked that the subject matter "intertwines admiration and envy with fascinating honesty". For Hot Press, John Walshe highlighted the "austere majesty" of the song. Japie Stoppelenburg of No Ripcord said that it succeeds in copying the "razorblade synths" of "I Wonder". The Observer reviewer Ben Thompson listed "Big Brother" as one of the five best tracks on Graduation and labeled it "utterly bizarre". Del F. Cowie from Exclaim! stated that the track is stellar, but shows West "yearning for 'stadium status'". Gregg LaGambina was negative in The A.V. Club, picking out the "awkward introspection" and seeing the song as awkward in general.

Although it was not released as a single, "Big Brother" managed to enter and peak at number 19 on the US Billboard Bubbling Under R&B/Hip-Hop Singles chart for the issue date of September 22, 2007.

== Live performances ==
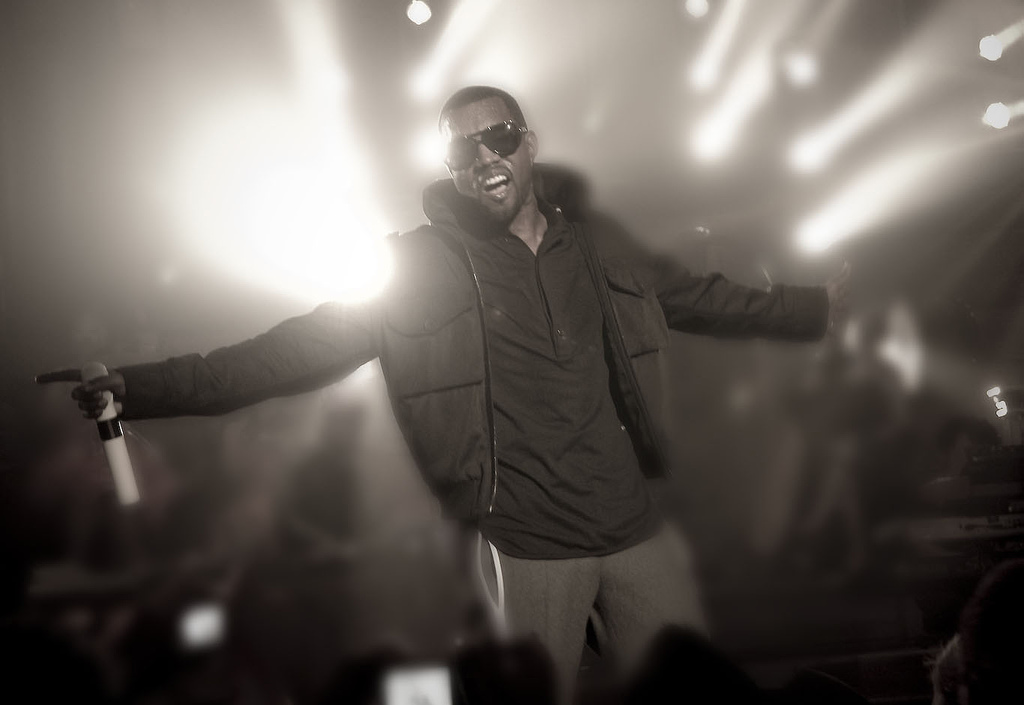
West first performed the song at Westminster Central Hall in Westminster, London.

West premiered "Big Brother" at Westminster Central Hall in Westminster on August 20, 2007. He was backed by a twenty-one piece all-female string section, background vocalists, a keyboardist, and his tour DJ A-Trak. The guests were greeted by staff members wearing graduation outfits and mortarboards in reference to the title of the album. West performed the song at a House of Blues concert promoting higher education sponsored by his charity foundation on August 25, 2007. It was one of the last songs of his set and while performing, West became emotional.

On September 11, 2007, West provided a live rendition of the song towards the end of his appearance on BET's 106 & Park. Jay-Z came onstage in response to the performance and teased the crowd with his 2003 track "Encore", which West produced. On October 29, the two performed the full track together again for West's set at JAM'N 94.5's annual concert. The "Big Brother/"Encore" rendition was recorded live and included in The Graduate, a 2007 collaborative mixtape made by hip hop producers Mick Boogie, Terry Urban, and 9th Wonder, hosted by West. Assisted by back-up singers, a full orchestra, and DJ Reflex, West performed "Big Brother" as part of a concert encore at the GM Place in Vancouver, Canada on October 17.

== Other versions ==
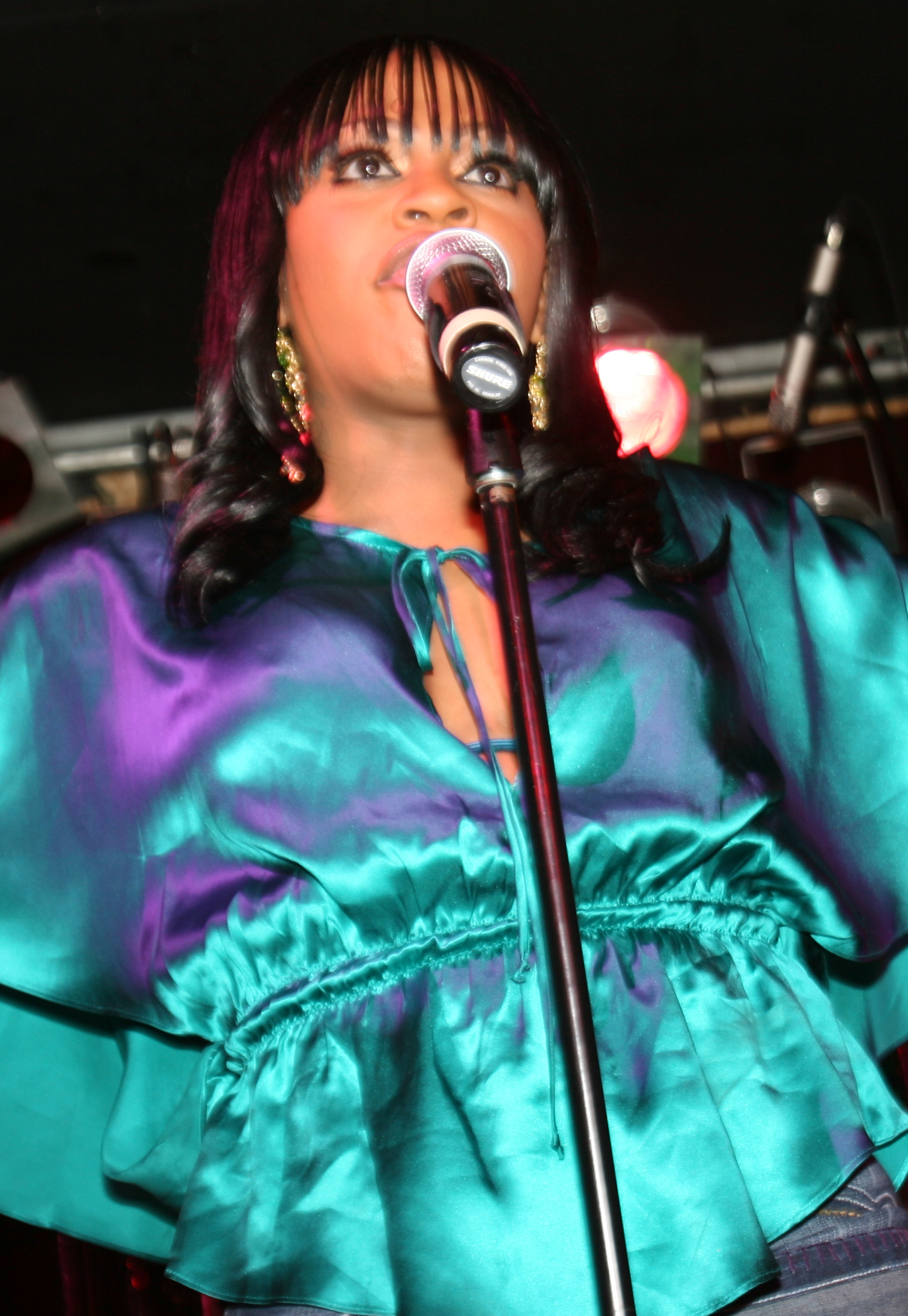
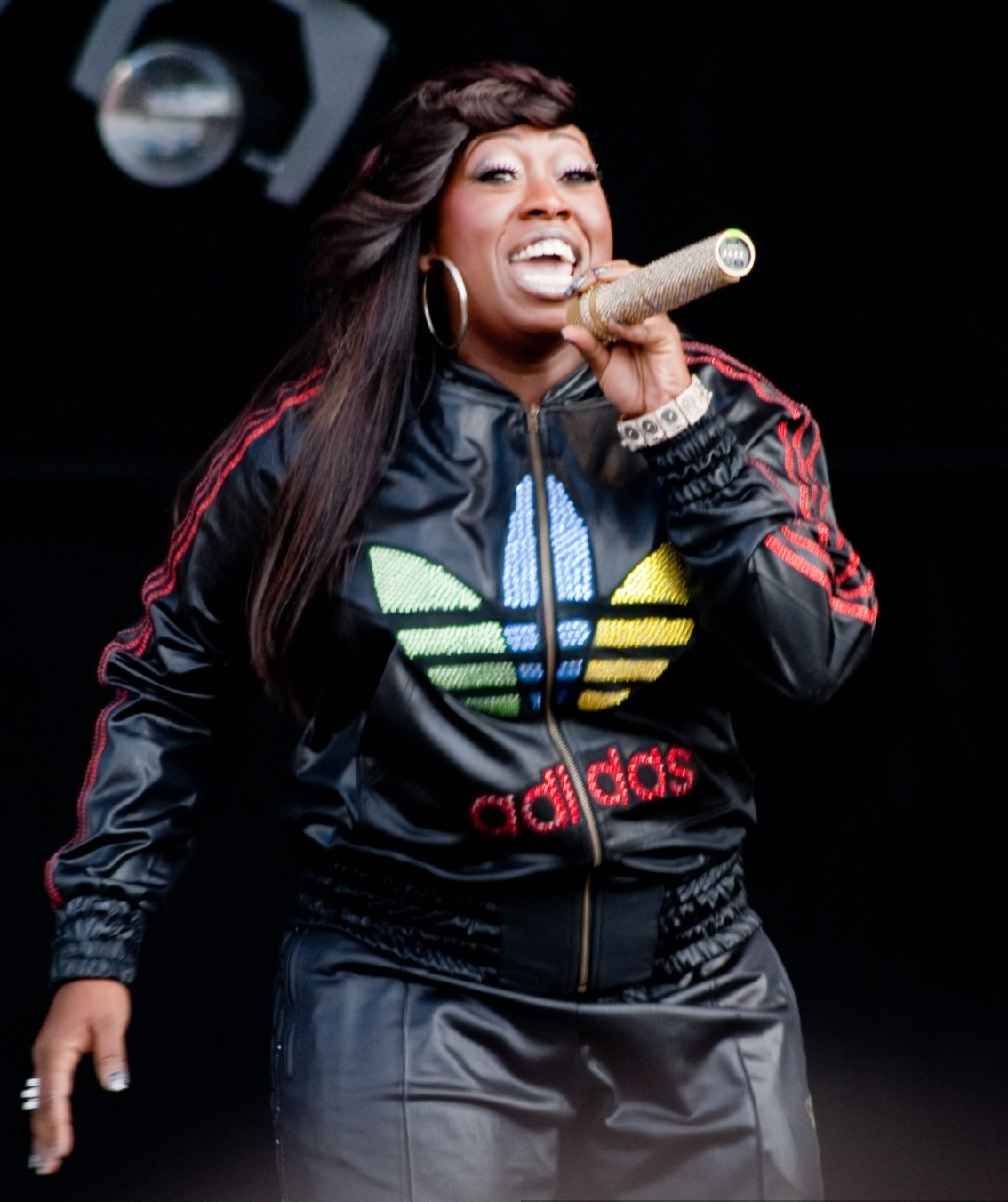
R&B singer Lil' Mo (left) created a female version in the form of "Big Sister", an answer song where she shares her admiration and appreciation for her own mentor, hip-hop artist Missy Elliott (right).

In 2007, Killa BH recorded a parody of "Big Brother" entitled "Foldger's Brother", focusing on rapper Joe Budden in place of Jay-Z. The track was featured in Budden's critically acclaimed mixtape Mood Muzik 3: For Better or for Worse (2007). In May 2008, hip hop duo Tha Dogg Pound rapped over the instrumental of "Big Brother" for "Half A Mil Freestyle". Former Shady Records artist Bobby Creekwater recorded a reinterpretation of the song in February 2009, with lyrics dedicated to label founder and rapper Eminem. In his rendition, Bobby explains how he was signed, what his relationship with Eminem and his labelmates was like, and where he stood within his record label Interscope Records.

For a show at the High Noon Saloon on March 19, 2012, with fellow underground rappers P.O.S and Astronautalis, and spoken word artist Dessa, Madison rapper F. Stokes performed his version of "Big Brother". Stokes dedicated the song's lyrics to his close friend P.O.S. The A.V. Club concert reviewer Joel Shanahan complimented the cover, writing, "While the notion admittedly seemed really cheesy at first, it was somehow more convincing coming from a heartfelt rapper like Stokes." Inspired by the song, R&B singer Lil' Mo created a female version of "Big Brother" in the form of "Big Sister" in May 2011, for her 2011 mixtape P.S. I Love You. It is an answer song, in which she expresses her admiration and appreciation for her mentor Missy Elliott. Lil' Mo later said that because of how much her mentor helped launched her career, the song was an important part of the mixtape.

== Credits and personnel ==
Information taken from Graduation liner notes.

Recording

- Recorded at Doppler Studios (Atlanta, GA) and Legacy Recording Studios (NYC)
- Mixed at Chung King Studios (NYC)

Personnel

- Kanye West – songwriter
- Toomp – songwriter, producer
- Andrew Dawson – recording, mix engineer
- Paul Sheehy – recording
- Dale Parsons – assistant mix engineer
- Andy Marcinkowski – assistant mix engineer

== Charts ==
Chart performance for "Big Brother"
Chart (2007)	Peak position
US Bubbling Under R&B/Hip-Hop Singles (Billboard)	19

== Certifications ==
Region	Certification	Certified units/sales
United States (RIAA)	Gold	500,000^{‡}
^{‡} Sales+streaming figures based on certification alone.
