= Bubblegum (B.G. & Chopper City Boyz song) =

Single by B.G. and Chopper City Boyz featuring Lady Dolla

from the album Life in the Concrete Jungle
- Released: July 8, 2008
- Genre: Hip-hop
- Length: 3:52
- Label: Asylum, Chopper City
- Songwriters: Christopher Dorsey, Travis Edwards, Van Smith
- Producer: Joe Blow da CEO

Chopper City Boyz singles chronology
"For a Minute" (2007)	"Bubblegum" (2008)	"Ya Heard Me" (2008)

"Bubblegum" is a song by B.G. and the Chopper City Boyz, released in July 2008 as the first single from their second album, Life in the Concrete Jungle. The song features Lady Dolla and was produced by Joe Blow da CEO.

== Music video ==
A video has been shot, and has been seen widely around the internet.

== Track listing ==
CD single

1. "Bubblegum" (Explicit)
