= Graduation (album) =

Studio album by Kanye West
- Released: September 11, 2007
- Recorded: 2005–2007
- Studios: Chung King; Sony Music (New York City); Chalice; Record Plant (Los Angeles)
- Genres: Hip-hop; pop rap; alternative hip-hop; progressive rap
- Length: 51:23
- Labels: Roc-A-Fella; Def Jam
- Producers: Kanye West; Brian "AllDay" Miller; DJ Toomp; Eric Hudson; Nottz; Warryn "Baby Dubb" Campbell

Kanye West chronology
Can't Tell Me Nothing (2007)	Graduation (2007)	808s & Heartbreak (2008)

Singles from Graduation
- 1. "Can't Tell Me Nothing" Released: May 15, 2007; 2. "Stronger" Released: July 31, 2007; 3. "Good Life" Released: October 2, 2007; 4. "Flashing Lights" Released: November 20, 2007; 5. "Homecoming" Released: February 2, 2008

Graduation is the third studio album by the American rapper Kanye West. It was released on September 11, 2007, through Def Jam Recordings and Roc-A-Fella Records. Recording sessions took place between 2005 and 2007 at several studios in New York and Los Angeles. It was primarily produced by West himself, with contributions from various other producers, including DJ Toomp. The album features guest appearances from recording artists such as Dwele, T-Pain, Lil Wayne, Mos Def, DJ Premier, and Chris Martin. The cover art, which features West's mascot at the time Dropout Bear in a new cartoon form, had its interior artwork designed by contemporary artist Takashi Murakami.

Inspired by stadium tours, house music and indie rock, Graduation marked a departure from the ornate, soul-based sound of West's previous releases as he musically progressed to more anthemic compositions. West incorporated layered synthesizers and dabbled with electronics while sampling from various music genres and altering his approach to rapping. He conveys an ambivalent outlook on his newfound fame and media scrutiny alongside providing inspirational messages of triumph directed at listeners. The album prematurely concludes the education theme of West's first two studio albums, The College Dropout (2004) and Late Registration (2005).

Graduation debuted at number one on the US Billboard 200, selling over 957,000 copies in the first week of sales. It has since sold over 8 million copies in the United States and been certified octuple platinum by the Recording Industry Association of America (RIAA). Five accompanying singles were released, including the international hits "Stronger", "Good Life", and "Homecoming", with "Stronger" topping the US Billboard Hot 100. The album received widespread acclaim from music critics who praised the production. It earned West his third Grammy Award for Best Rap Album and his third Album of the Year nomination. It was named as one of the best albums of 2007 by multiple publications, including Rolling Stone and USA Today. In the years since, it has attracted greater acclaim, widely regarded as one of West's best albums, being listed among numerous decade-end lists and later named to the lists of Rolling Stone's 500 Greatest Albums of All Time and NME's 500 Greatest Albums of All Time.

The coinciding release dates between Graduation and fellow American rapper 50 Cent's Curtis generated much publicity over the idea of a sales competition, resulting in record-breaking sales performances by both albums. The success of the former and the outcome of its competition with the latter marked the end of the dominance of gangsta rap in mainstream hip-hop. Graduation is credited with paving the way for other hip-hop artists who did not conform to gangster conventions to find commercial acceptance.

== Background ==
Graduation is the third installment of West's planned tetralogy of education-themed studio albums, which West subsequently later deviated from due to events surrounding the conception of his fourth studio album, 808s & Heartbreak (2008). The album demonstrates yet another distinctive progression in West's musical style and approach to production. After spending the previous year touring the world with Irish rock band U2 on their Vertigo Tour, West became inspired by watching Bono open the stadium tours every night to incredible ovations and sought out to compose anthemic rap songs that could operate more efficiently in large stadiums and arenas. In West's attempt to accomplish this "stadium-status" endeavor, West incorporated layered electronic synthesizers into his hip-hop production, which also finds him utilizing slower tempos, being influenced by the music of the 1980s, and experimenting with electronic music. West was particularly influenced by house music, a subgenre of electronic dance music that first originated in his hometown of Chicago, Illinois in the early 1980s. West has stated that growing up, he would listen to hip-hop music at home or in his car, but when he felt like dancing, he would attend a house club. While he rarely listened to house at home, he still felt it was an important part of his culture and background.

West further broadened his musical palette on Graduation by not limiting himself to his customary use of samples and interpolation from classic soul records and instead drew influences from a far more eclectic range of music genres. Along with house music, Graduation contains samples and music elements of euro-disco, hard rock, electronica, lounge, progressive rock, synth-pop, electro, krautrock, dub, reggae, and dancehall. Also, for much of the third studio album, West modified his style of rapping and adopted a dilatory, exuberant flow in emulation of Bono's operatic singing. West altered his vocabulary, he utilised less percussive consonants for his vocal delivery in favor of smoother vowel harmonies. In addition to U2, West drew inspiration from other arena rock bands such as the Rolling Stones and Led Zeppelin for the melodies and chord progressions of his songs. In terms of lyricism, he simplifies some of his rhymes after touring with The Rolling Stones on their A Bigger Bang concert tour and discovering he could not captivate the audiences as well with his most complex lyrical themes.

West made a conscious decision to abstain from the widespread recording practice of excessive rap albums saturated with skits and filler like in his prior two albums, feeling that they weakened the album experience, and instead filled Graduation with significantly fewer tracks — in this case 13 (or 14 on the digital version), which would continue with the rest of his other albums such as My Beautiful Dark Twisted Fantasy and Yeezus. West cites the rock bands The Killers, Keane, Modest Mouse, and indie-pop singer-songwriter Feist for being among his favorite musicians and having considerably profound influence on the sound of Graduation. Due largely to these factors and the inclusion of layered electronic synthesizers, West believed that his record took hip-hop in a different direction. He also acknowledged that the differences did not in and of themselves make Graduation a good album; however, he felt it was an accurate representation of the music he was listening to and inspired by at that time.

Singer Chris Brown intended to name his second studio album Graduation, which was set to be released in 2007. However, after discovering that Kanye West planned to use the same title for his third studio album, Brown respected West's decision and changed his album's title to Exclusive.

== Recording and production ==
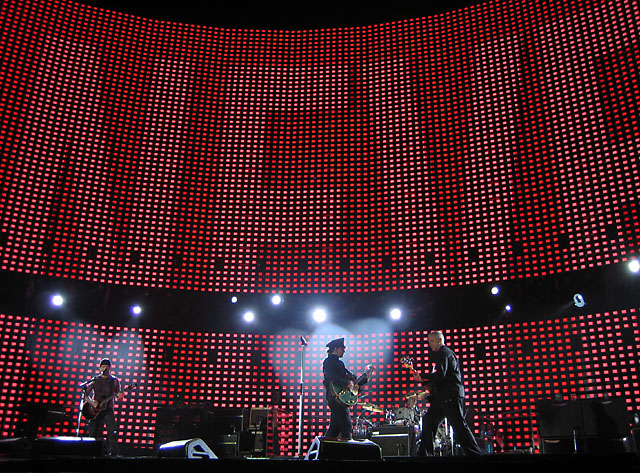
West's experiences on arena rock tours such as U2's Vertigo Tour (pictured) inspired his direction for the album.

West began working on Graduation immediately after releasing his second studio album Late Registration. By late September 2005, West had already completed three songs for the album, which he intended to contain a total of twelve tracks. Around the time of recording, West would often listen to songs written by folk and country singer-songwriters Bob Dylan and Johnny Cash in hopes of developing methods to augment his word play and storytelling abilities. The former musician had been recommended to West by multiple of his friends, including English disc jockey Samantha Ronson, all of whom claimed his music and the way he dealt with the press reminded them of Dylan. West also listened to his favorite alternative rock bands, including The Killers, Radiohead, Modest Mouse, and Keane, in order to gain new ideas on how to make his hip-hop production style more stadium-friendly. Additionally, West would often test his new songs on his iPod, in his office, in dance clubs and just about anywhere people might listen to his music. He would then make adjustments to the tracks based on feedback he received, repeating the process as many times as necessary.

In comparison to previous albums, Graduation features fewer guest appearances from other recording artists. West elaborated that it was a fully conscious decision to keep his guest vocalists at a minimum, saying that, "When I hear the records of my favorite bands – The Killers or Coldplay – you only hear one voice from start to finish". R&B singers T-Pain and Dwele, New York rappers Mos Def and ALBe. Back, and famed hip-hop record producer DJ Premier are featured in individual tracks primarily to deliver melodic hooks and refrains. However, though he originally intended for Graduation to be completely devoid of guest rap verses, West decided to invite New Orleans rapper Lil Wayne on the track "Barry Bonds". At the time, the two MCs had been working together, with West contributing to the production of Lil Wayne's sixth studio album Tha Carter III. As for the absence of skits, West explained, "There's just serious songs, hooks, chords, and ideas. No special effects or antics ... and no fake Bernie Mac!". West instead decided to record two earthy musical interludes in place of the hip-hop skits. He incorporated African sounds and polyrhythmic percussion into both. However, for unknown reasons, the two musical interludes were omitted from the studio album.

Many songs on Graduation contain background vocals provided by Connie Mitchell of the Australian dance music group Sneaky Sound System. The collaboration came about when West met her bandmates Angus McDonald and Daimon Downey at a diner in Sydney while touring the country with U2 around November 2006. Seeking musical inspiration, West asked McDonald for ideas, who in turn suggested that he be introduced to Mitchell. Upon meeting Mitchell after she arrived at Studios 301 where he was recording music during the tour, West had her sing over a vocal track and quickly took a liking to her voice. U2 singer Bono and guitarist The Edge also complimented Mitchell's singing while visiting the studio. Some time later, Mitchell received a call from West who asked if she could travel to The Record Plant in Los Angeles to begin recording tracks for his third studio album. Mitchell later admitted that while she previously did not know who West was and never really cared for hip-hop music, the collaboration has changed her views.

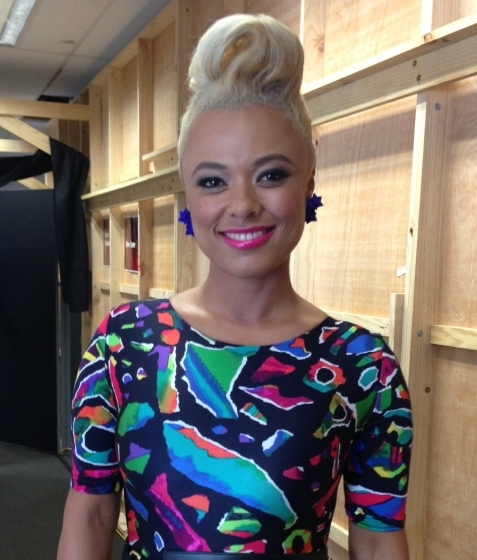
Connie Mitchell contributed vocals to several songs on the album.

During an interview with Billboard, West revealed that he had worked with Chris Martin, the lead singer of the British alternative rock band Coldplay, on a song entitled "Homecoming", and that it could possibly be released as the lead single for Graduation. The collaboration occurred the year before when West and Martin met one another during an impromptu jam session at the Abbey Road Studios in London, England. West had just finished performing at a show that had been held at Abbey Road and the band just so happened to be recording their music in the recording studio at exactly the same time. The song in itself is actually a re-vamping for "Home (Windy)", a track that originated from a demo tape dating back to the year 2001. It was made available two years later under the new title "Home" on West's 2003 mixtape Get Well Soon... and also on the advance copy of West's debut studio album The College Dropout, which due to a leak was never released. This original version possesses West's once trademark classic soul vocal sample production style, with singer John Legend on the chorus, which contains lyrics that are different than Martin's. This is due to the fact that Martin asked West to change the song's lyrical content.

Widely considered by music critics and listeners alike to be the most radio-friendly track on Graduation, West defines the album's third single "Good Life" as the song with the most "blatant hit-recordness". The track features vocals from R&B singer T-Pain, who utilizes the voice audio processor technology of Auto-Tune. The song is sampled from Michael Jackson's song "P.Y.T. (Pretty Young Thing)". West had previously experimented with the technology on his debut album The College Dropout for the background vocals on the songs "Jesus Walks" and "Never Let Me Down". During his brief stay in Sweden, West sent through sixteen different mixes of "Good Life" over to their recording studio for the audio mastering process. West admitted that he actually did not really care for the single, but he was pressured into releasing it by his record label Def Jam Recordings. However, West has since clarified that he does not retain any lingering animosity whatsoever towards his record label in regards to this.

Graduation started taking definite form around the time of the filming of the music video for its second single "Stronger", whereas prior West had been "aimlessly making songs". The music video was directed by famed music video director, film director, and screenwriter Hype Williams. The sci-fi imagery of music video inspired West to take his album in a more futuristic direction. After the filming of the music video, which began before West had even written the song's second verse, he returned to the studio to redo parts of "Stronger" and various other tracks he recorded for the album, watching films such as Total Recall for more ideas. West mixed the track seventy-five times, as he could not seem to get the kick drum to sound precisely the way that he wanted it to, amongst other issues. He worked on "Stronger" with eight different audio engineers and eleven different mix engineers around the globe and recorded over fifty versions of the track. Still feeling dissatisfied after hearing the number-one hit single inside a club compared alongside Timbaland's 2007 single "The Way I Are", which was his favorite hip-hop beat at the time, West enlisted the record producer to assist him in redoing the drum programming.

The album also sees the return of composer and multi-instrumentalist Jon Brion – who had played an integral role as the co-executive producer on West's previous studio album Late Registration – for the track "Drunk and Hot Girls". West features vocal harmony during the chorus with guest artist Mos Def, who just after his voice experiences a four-second audio delay, also delivers the song's reverb-filled bridge.

More than any other song on the album, the epic stadium-rap power ballad "I Wonder" was the most influenced by U2. West cites it as one of his top three favorite songs from Graduation. West imparted that he had sought out to make the hip-hop variation of the rock band's "City of Blinding Lights". West reportedly heard the snare drum which was used for the track while shopping for furniture at Moss and spent many weeks working on it. West has also said that he wrote the song while thinking of performing it onstage in front of an audience of over 50,000 people. With this in mind, he placed a significant amount of concentration on speaking at high volumes with fewer wording and initially delivers his defiant lyrics in an intense staccato vocal style. West raps the song's three verses using single and double-time rhyme schemes. He stresses each syllable in each word in the minimalist first verse. West then transitions to a faster, more fluid flow for the more intricate second and third verses. West considered the release of "I Wonder" as the album's fourth single. But he instead chose "Flashing Lights", which he refers to as the "coolest" track on the album.

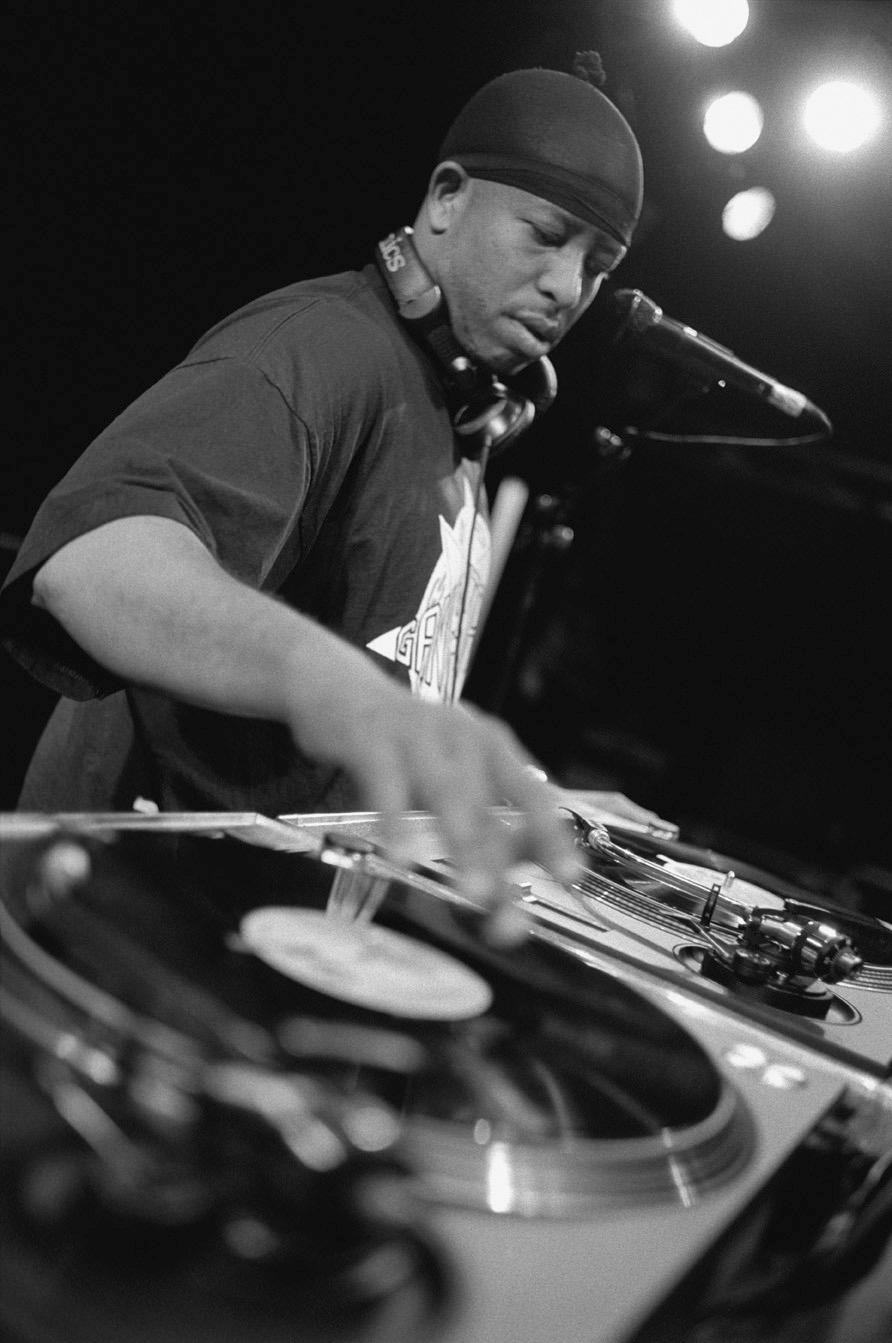
The track "Everything I Am" features turntable scratches by famed record producer DJ Premier

The beat for "The Glory" was originally made for West's GOOD Music associate, close friend, and fellow Chicago hip-hop artist Common, whose seventh album, Finding Forever, was being produced and recorded by West simultaneously with Graduation. As was the case with both their previous albums, certain tracks that West originally crafted for Finding Forever that Common declined eventually ended up on his own album. "Everything I Am" was yet another song intended for Common but was passed on, a fact which West addresses within the opening lines. The record features turntable scratches contributed by famed hip-hop record producer DJ Premier. After West had played the demo for "Everything I Am" over the phone for DJ Premier and asked him what he thought of it, DJ Premier then replied that he enjoyed the lyrics and the innovative beat and offered to scratch over it. When working on the track, and while following the numerous instructions that were supplied by West, DJ Premier took seven different styles of scratches, including drum breaks, then cut all of them up into different rhythms, and scattered them all throughout the track, providing West with many different ideas to choose from.

While written by West, who envisioned its concept and chorus while riding an elevator, the soul-baring Jay-Z dedication "Big Brother" stands as the only song on Graduation that he did not produce. The production of the track was instead handled solely by Atlanta record producer DJ Toomp. According to West's cousin, soul singer Tony Williams, Jay-Z became quite emotional after West played a part of "Big Brother" for him in the studio for the first time. During an interview with Rolling Stone, West himself recalled that it was "a very serious moment". When asked for his opinion, Jay-Z replied that he considered "Big Brother" a fair portrayal from a little brother's perspective. Jay-Z went on to say that he also thought that the song was "brilliantly written" and voice the belief of it being West's best song since "Jesus Walks" as far as structure and emotion.

Although "Bittersweet Poetry" appears as a Japanese bonus track on Graduation, it was actually one of the first songs crafted for Late Registration. After seeing the 2004 biographical film Ray together, West and blues-rock musician John Mayer decided to collaborate on a record and immediately went back to a recording studio to compose the song "Bittersweet" with the help of Keyshia Cole. This was not the first time West and Mayer collaborated with one another. The two previously worked together to make "Go!", the third single from Common's sixth studio album Be, which came about when Mayer went to visit West at The Record Plant in Los Angeles. In the end, because West felt that their song did not coincide well into the overall soundscape of his second studio album, it was subsequently unincluded.

== Musical style ==
With Graduation, West made a departure from the soul samples of The College Dropout and the heavy orchestration of Late Registration. Motivated by stadium impulses, West ventured towards a more atmospheric soundscape, being imbued with arena rock elements while exploring electronic music. The musical progression arose from West touring the world in 2006 with U2 and the Rolling Stones. The change also came about from him listening to music that encompasses genres such as rock and house. According to Jayson Greene of Stylus Magazine, West had developed a fascination with Euro-disco, a European form of electronic dance music. Going further, a columnist for Slant Magazine asserted that the album's hip-hop beats would be "European-club-worthy" were they stripped of the vocals. Most importantly, Greene perceived that West had developed an affinity with electronic synthesizers. Chicago Tribune music critic Greg Kot commented on the incorporation of synthesizer sounds, saying he viewed Graduation as "an album steeped in keyboard tones, in all their richness and variety". Mark Pytlik of Pitchfork surmised that the album demonstrated a new electronic production style, specifically noting its modulated electronic noises. By contrast, AllMusic's Andy Kellman wrote, "Though the synthesizer use marks a clear, conscious diversion from Kanye's past productions, highlights ... are deeply rooted in the Kanye of old, using nostalgia-inducing samples, elegant pianos and strings, and gospel choirs". Graduation has been regarded as a pop-rap album by music journalists Brad Callas, Joshua Botte of NPR, AbsolutePunk, Vice magazine's Eric Sundermann, Jay Willis of GQ, and The Atlantic's Spencer Korhaber.

West retracted much of the orchestral production that had characterized Late Registration; he replaced the production with heavy, layered electronic synthesizers that feature Gothic tendencies at loud volumes throughout Graduation. West injected distorted synth-chords, house beats, electro-disco rhythms, and a wide array of audio-effects into his hip-hop production. All the while, West buried his signature kicks and snares deep beneath the decomposing layers of synths into the bottom of the mix. Though he continued to use vocal samples, West gleaned them before also pushing the samples underneath the synths, causing them to "sound like voices trapped in a huge machine, not like organic, subliminal connections to a mythical black-music past". As always is the case with his productions, West does not reply nor settle simply on samples alone. Instead, there lies a sense of multi-layered music evidently within each track. Even in new, unfamiliar musical surroundings, West retained both his self-confidence as well as his close attention to sonic detail. As a result of this, the album contains numerous random, semi-audible sounds that may seem challenging to notice during the first few listens. The sounds range from keyboard arpeggios to crowd cheers and hard rock guitars; they act as a supplement for the atypical samples and the layered electronic synths. Throughout Graduation, West included enough subtle instrumental flourishes and studio embellishments to warrant a repeated, close, and careful listening experience. According to Ann Powers from the Los Angeles Times, the album's subtly dark tone was a byproduct of the inevitable toll placed on West as an artist, "an innovator in a genre that he must at least partially destroy to renew", who was torn between his devotion to hip-hop tradition and his "restless artistic drive":

Graduation's intricate musical environments take a while to comprehend, and at times they seem at odds with West's confrontational lyrics. But this contradictory music makes sense when heard as an attempt to express an internal struggle – between the Kanye West hip-hop made and the West who can't be contained by it or any other genre. It is hard to stop running with the crowd, even for a trendsetter. But West is on the verge, and moving forward.

Despite the latter of the two's predominant synthetic attributes and the overall electronic sound, the emphasis placed on string arrangements that was prominent on Late Registration remained a significant factor on Graduation. Similarly to its predecessor, the album was not restricted to the limits of conventional looping techniques that are typical of traditional hip-hop production. Instead, West continued to implement sudden musical shifts within the multi-layered song structures and express composed introductions, bridges, and codas, all of which showed attention to detail. For Graduation, West produced songs that combine hip-hop beats with anthemic refrains and continued to employ his skill in layering keys, strings, and vocals to obtain the melodies of samples. Through acting as his own producer, West managed to maintain quality control over the album's music to ensure that "his productions build momentum even when they revolve around a handful of repeated samples [and] nearly every song on Graduation is memorable for both its hooks and its overall sound". As the album progresses, its textures become harder and denser with every track. Under the belief that Late Registration had been far too indulgent, poorly arranged, and oversaturated with unnecessary sonic accoutrements, West took measures to simplify Graduation. West crafted the album to contain less ornate production, not have any hip-hop skits, and be sequenced to produce a tighter, more cohesive package.

=== Songs ===
"Flashing Lights"
"Flashing Lights" contains manipulated vocals over a string-laden backbeat and showcases a stuttering synth sequence.

"Stronger"
"Stronger" is built around a Daft Punk vocal sample and also features West's forceful delivery exhibited on the album.

Graduation opens on a sparse note with "Good Morning", beginning with an echoed, metronomic cowbell beat and a thumping bassline melded with a simple, arpeggiating synthesizer drone. The drone is drowned by the music that arrives at the chorus, which is a conflation of ambient synths and an astral backing choir crafted from a non-verbal vocal sample of "Someone Saved My Life Tonight" by Elton John. "Good Morning" eventually concludes with the voice of Jay-Z reiterating lyrics from "The Ruler's Back", the rapper's own opening track of his sixth studio album The Blueprint. The production for "Champion" features intermittent drops and 808-handclaps and expresses a slight jazz-rock influence, eschewing guitars and trumpets in favor of breezy synths. During the verses, West raps over a constant loop of the words "their eyes" while the chopped-up hook is formed from the question, "Did you realize, that you were a champion?" Both phrases are recontextualized from "Kid Charlemagne" by Steely Dan. The song also sports a reggae-inspired bridge delivered by Connie Mitchell in a distinct toasting vocal style. The soul-fired track "I Wonder" starts off with its piano-based refrain, which contains samples of "My Song" by Labi Siffre. It then proceeds to morph into a myriad of interlaced synths that are impacted by distorted snare drum strokes (taken from "Ambitionz az a Ridah" by 2Pac, which samples the drums from "Pee-Wee's Dance" by Joeski Love) and ethereal electric keyboards. During the bridge, the chord progression changes and the song adopts a heavy string section that emulates the melody of its synths. The composition then enters an instrumental passage and finishes off with a sweeping string arrangement.

"Good Life" utilizes multi-tracked, interlocking vocals that harmonize with guest singer T-Pain's Auto-Tuned voice. The song's melody is based on sampled keyboards from "P.Y.T. (Pretty Young Thing)" by pop star Michael Jackson, with the tempo slightly decreased and the pitch raised to the point its sound resembles squealing shrieks. "Barry Bonds" (named after the baseball player) is built on a moaning bass line and Gothic organ, while punctuated by wailing sampled from "Long Red" by Mountain. "Drunk and Hot Girls" exhibits a sluggish waltz pitched with the rhythm of an Eastern European drinking song. It contains a mix of dark orchestration and detuned electronics with elements of "Sing Swan Song" by German progressive rock band Can. West claimed that while listening to their song, he heard the words "drunk and hot girls" rather than the actual "drunken hot ghost" lyrics. Rather than rap, West and guest artist Mos Def sing along to the song's melody. Opening with a gradual, rising crescendo of symphonic strings, "Flashing Lights" emits synth twinklings before transforming into a moderately-paced, synth-driven beat. After the introduction, in which Mitchell's processed vocals repeat the titular hook four times, West raps the two verses, each one followed by the chorus sung by Dwele coupled with the hook. Following a break, the song enters a passage where its heavily manipulated hook echoes in and out before the coda draws the composition to a close. "Stronger" is built around a sample of "Harder, Better, Faster, Stronger" by Daft Punk, while its echoing deep, hallow drums affect the electronic sound.

Being composed with nothing more than a Rhodes piano, a vocal sample, and turntable scratches, "Everything I Am" is the album's most minimalistic production. West marries a down-tempo beat to gentle piano chords which are accentuated by soulful cooing sampled from "If We Can't Be Lovers" by Prince Phillip Mitchell. The low-key track has a scratched hook by DJ Premier formed with the vocal sample which says "Here we go again" taken from "Bring the Noise" by Public Enemy from their 1988 album It Takes a Nation of Millions to Hold Us Back. With its thick, heavy bass-line pattern, "The Glory" is an up-tempo number which revisits the "chipmunk-soul" that once defined the early production style of West. It displays a sped-up and high-pitched vocal sample of "Save the Country" by Laura Nyro accompanied by uplifting strings, keys, and an all-male gospel choir with drums from "Long Red" by Mountain. Chris Martin sings the chorus and supplies a gospel-style piano motif while West raps over heavy yet buoyant drums on "Homecoming". The chatter of a noisy, cheering crowd can inexplicably be heard lurking in the background throughout the track. The Jay-Z ode "Big Brother" begins with West uttering the words, "Stadium status...", backed by a string orchestra, pounding drums, a distorted guitar riff and plinking piano keys. Around mid-verse, the track adopts synths that mimic the melodies of the string section. Before the second verse, additional instrumentation enters; including a heavy bass-line, metallic percussion, and 808-handclaps. The studio album's final track "Good Night" exhibits the production characteristics of West's next musical evolution. West juxtaposes the glitchy, mechanical sound of an 8-bit beat with the more elegant, traditional sound of a classical piano.

== Lyrics and themes ==
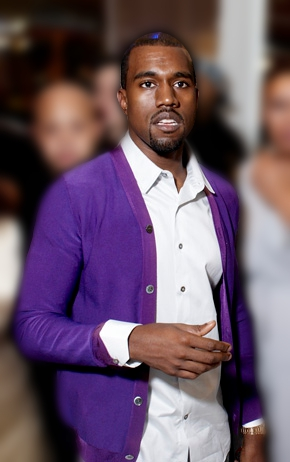
West wrote lyrics expressing an ambivalence towards his newfound wealth and fame.

In comparison to previous albums, which were largely driven by observational commentary on matters pertaining to social welfare, Graduation is more introspective in nature and addresses personal themes. West stated that he wanted to make inspirational music and placed more focus on individual perspective and experience that listeners could connect with in an attempt to create "people's theme songs". Dismayed that the messages behind his complex lyricism were frequently lost on listeners and did not carry well during live performances, West made an attempt to simplify his lyrics and use more simplistic rhyme schemes for more straightforward verses while concentrating on speaking volumes with sparser wording on Graduation. Having committed a significant amount of time towards elevating his storytelling abilities by listening to folk musicians, West manages to form a lyrical narrative within nearly every song on the album. West dedicated a majority of the album towards conducting an analysis himself and conveying his ambivalent outlook on his newfound wealth and fame. As such, West's subversive songwriting fluctuates between playful self-aggrandizement and critical self-doubt. While confident, extroverted and celebratory at face value, many songs contained on Graduation were thematically distanced and retained melancholic subtext. Some music critics remarked that compounded with West's urgent, emotive rapping style, the record sounded as if he were experiencing an existential crisis.

Good Morning primarily features motivational lyrics about someone achieving their goals, but also touches on celebrity status and culture, and West's negative outlook on it. The free-associative "Champion" is also primarily composed of motivational lyrics, but West also briefly touches on the difficult relationship he had with his father–who divorced from his mother when he was just three-years-old–eventually reaching the conclusion that even with their ups and downs, in the end, his father was a champion in his eyes. West described "Stronger" as an "emancipation", as he uses the song to vent his frustration over mistakes he has made in the past. He describes his tribulations with music critics and media causing his return as a "Stronger" rapper, as the song title implies. "I Wonder" carries an introspective tone, retaining a chorus about finding one's dreams, while West uses the verses to describe the struggle a person experiences in determining the meaning behind their life and achieving those dreams. Inspired by watching Bono open stadium tours, West concentrated on speaking volumes without using too many words on the song and delivers his raps in an exuberant, staccato manner. Using the same vocal styling, "Flashing Lights" tells the operatic narrative of man contemplating the complexities of a tragic relationship. "Can't Tell Me Nothing" serves as West's reflection on his fame and is characterized by bitter remorse and defiant self-awareness. West begins the song by expounding his conflicted feelings regarding wealth and desire, describing a compulsion to spend that overwhelms any and all other objectives in life. He ties this into his perceived overall inability to keep himself together even as he grows into an increasingly prominent figure in the public eye.

West regains his lyrical dexterity on "Barry Bonds", a competitive, though friendly battle with Lil Wayne in which the two MC exchange braggadocious rhymes. The song uses Major League Baseball player Barry Bonds as a metaphor for West's ability to create music hits. "Drunk and Hot Girls" is a first-person narrative that illustrates a man courting an attractive intoxicated woman in a club but gets more than what he bargained for. "Everything I Am" is a song of self-examination, in which West attempts to confront his fallacies by surveying the consequences of his outspokenness ruminating over various ways people expect him to conduct himself. In the track, West addresses his indifference towards constructing a gangster persona, his refusal to dress and act like every other rapper, his inclination towards social commentary, and his lack of self-restraint. West comes to the conclusion that while he will never be able to live up to people's expectations and will always be disadvantageously flawed; it's all these imperfections and more that serve to make up who he is. When writing the song, West thought of a young girl in high school dealing with people coming down on her. The Glory, like Champion, is also motivational, featuring lyrics with West looking on his fame, and features samples from Laura Nyro's Save The Country and Mountain's Long Red.

"Homecoming" serves as a heartfelt tribute to West's hometown of Chicago, Illinois. Using an extended metaphor that personifies the city as a childhood sweetheart named Wendy, or 'Windy' (a reference to Chicago's nickname of the 'Windy City'), West rhymes about his love for Chicago and his guilt over leaving "her" to pursue his musical dream. The song's opening lines lyrically paraphrase "I Used to Love H.E.R.", a similarly metaphoric hip-hop song made by West's close friend and label mate Common, who later appeared in the single's music video. West dedicated "Big Brother" to Jay Z, whom he feels so close to that he sees him as a brother. Within the song, West dually details his love and admiration as well as his envy and antagonism towards Jay Z, metaphorically equating their relationship to that of a sibling rivalry. West also uses the song's chorus as a subsidiary dedication to his mentor No I.D., who first taught him how to produce music. Similar to its musicality, the songwriting characteristics of the album-closing track, "Good Night" alludes to West's next musical progression. The majority of song is composed of repetitive recitations of its choruses and bridges by Mos Def and Al Be Back. West melodically raps only one single verse in which he nostalgically reminisces over taking trips to the museum with his grandparents. As his verse draws to a close, West chastises that a person cannot dwell on the past, and charges himself with living his life like he has no tomorrow. In retrospect, with the death of his mother Donda West less than two months after the album was released in addition to the dissolution of his engagement with fiancée Alexis Phifer, the trace amounts of melancholy found scattered throughout Graduation would all but envelop West's next studio album, 808s & Heartbreak.

== Artwork ==
Dropout Bear being pursued by a monstrous cloud within the interior artwork of Graduation.

West collaborated with Japanese contemporary artist Takashi Murakami to oversee the art direction of Graduation as well as design the cover art for the album's accompanying singles. Often called "the Warhol of Japan", Murakami's surrealistic visual art is characterized by cartoonish creatures that appear friendly and cheerful at first glance, but possess dark, twisted undertones. The collaboration between the two came about when West visited Murakami's Kaikai Kiki studio during a brief trip to Asaka, Japan. The album's artwork expresses colorful, pastel imagery influenced by Murakami's affiliation with Superflat, a post-modern art movement influenced by manga and anime. Its production process took place over the course of several weeks, with West constantly visualizing new images and emailing the ideas to Murakami and his team. Bringing the educational theme expressed by West's previous albums to a close, the visual plotline of the images contained within the liner notes lead up to a graduation ceremony that takes places within a fictional college institution situated within a futuristic metropolis called Universe City. Murakami explained the metaphor behind the artwork saying:

The cover is based on Kanye's theme of student life. School. It's a place of dreams, of righteousness, a place to have fun. It's also occasionally a place where you experience the rigid dogma of the human race. Kanye's music scrapes sentimentality and aggressiveness together like sandpaper, and he uses his grooves to unleash this tornado that spins with the zeitgeist of the times. I too wanted to be swept up and spun around in that tornado.

The artwork's storyline centers around "Dropout Bear", West's anthropomorphic teddy bear mascot. The story begins on a rainy day with Dropout being awoken by his alarm clock, and after realising he is running late, runs out of his apartment to his car, modeled after a DeLorean. When the car's engine dies, he is forced to find an alternative means of transportation. Dropout attempts to hail a cab but it speeds right past him, soaking him with puddle water. He then tries to get onto a metro rail but just misses it as it pulls away. Left with no other options, Dropout is reduced to pursuing his goal on foot. As he races down sidewalks, populated by multi-eyed, living mushrooms, Dropout is pursued by a monstrous rain cloud that attempts to swallow him whole. Eventually, Dropout Bear arrives at the university and makes it to his ceremony just in time to stand before his colleagues, a wide variety of anthropomorphic creatures like himself. The visual story concludes with Dropout Bear being shot out of a cannon from the university into the sky into another stratosphere on the back cover.

The cover art for Graduation was cited as the fifth best album cover of the year by Rolling Stone. Murakami later reproduced the artwork designs through the use of cel-shaded animation within a three-minute animated music video for the opening track "Good Morning". After collaborating with West on the artwork and video, Murakami later worked with him on the cover art for West and Kid Cudi's eponymous debut studio album, Kids See Ghosts (2018).

== Marketing ==
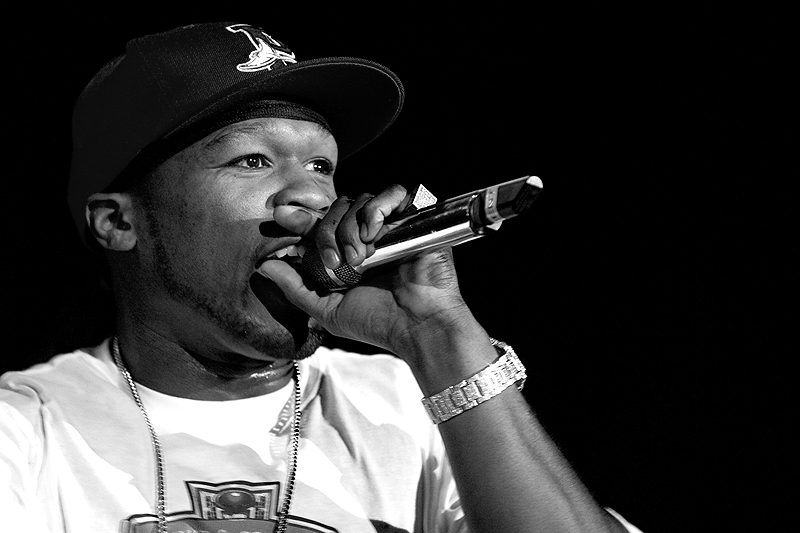
Publicity over the album's release date pitted West in a sales competition against rapper 50 Cent (pictured).

While hosting a listening session for his second studio album Late Registration on August 3, 2005, at Sony Music Studios, West revealed that he wanted to schedule the release of Graduation sometime around October 2006. Several months later, on March 28, 2007, West appeared on the Los Angeles radio station Power 106. He said that he was working on his third album and Common's seventh album Finding Forever and rapped a few lyrics from one of his songs in a cappella. On May 11, it was announced that the release date for Graduation was September 18. West debuted the album's lead single "Can't Tell Me Nothing" on the New York radio station Hot 97 on May 15. He then released a free mixtape under the same name onto the Internet on May 27. The mixtape features preview clips of songs that would appear on Graduation and showcases various artists signed onto West's record label GOOD Music as well as collaborations with other unaffiliated musicians. It also contains "Us Placers", the debut song of Child Rebel Soldier, a supergroup West formed with Lupe Fiasco and Pharrell.

At the end of May, Island Def Jam pushed forward the release date for Graduation up from September to an unspecified late August date, a decision that West first announced on the introductory track of his Can't Tell Me Nothing mixtape. On July 19, the album's release date was changed once more and moved to September 11, 2007, the same US release date as rapper 50 Cent's third studio album Curtis. When first presented with the proposal of his label moving the release date of his album yet again as well as the idea of a sales competition between him and 50 Cent, West initially expressed his indifference towards the thought, saying, "When I heard that thing about the debate, I thought that was the stupidest thing. When my album drops and 50's album drops, everybody wins because you're gonna get a lot of good music at the same time". However, then Def Jam president and CEO Jay Z welcomed competition, feeling that it would be prosperous for hip-hop, and the date became permanent.

The album's release generated much publicity over a sales competition with 50 Cent's Curtis. Three months prior to the September 11 release date, West extended his gratitude towards 50 Cent for the enthusiasm and excitement the friendly competition had produced. Though confident that he would emerge victorious, West said that he would be perfectly fine with losing to 50 Cent, stating that he would rather "be #2 on that day rather than come out and be #1 on a day nobody cares about". In an interview for USA Today, 50 Cent expressed his view on the idea of a sales competition, stating "It's great marketing – for Kanye West. But I sell way more records than Kanye West, and I generate way more interest than Kanye West. They think they can match us up, but they'll find out when that week goes by and the sales come back. This is no rivalry". "Mine will sell and his will still be on the shelf", 50 Cent told Rolling Stone. On August 10, 50 Cent confirmed during an interview with SOHH that he would end his career as a solo recording artist if Graduation were to sell more copies than Curtis in the United States. However, 50 Cent later retracted his statement within an MTV interview due to his contract agreements with Aftermath Entertainment and Interscope Records. But most retailers and radio programmers interviewed picked West, whose single, "Stronger", was Number Six on Billboard's Hot 100 -while none of 50's four singles climbed higher than the thirty-second spot.

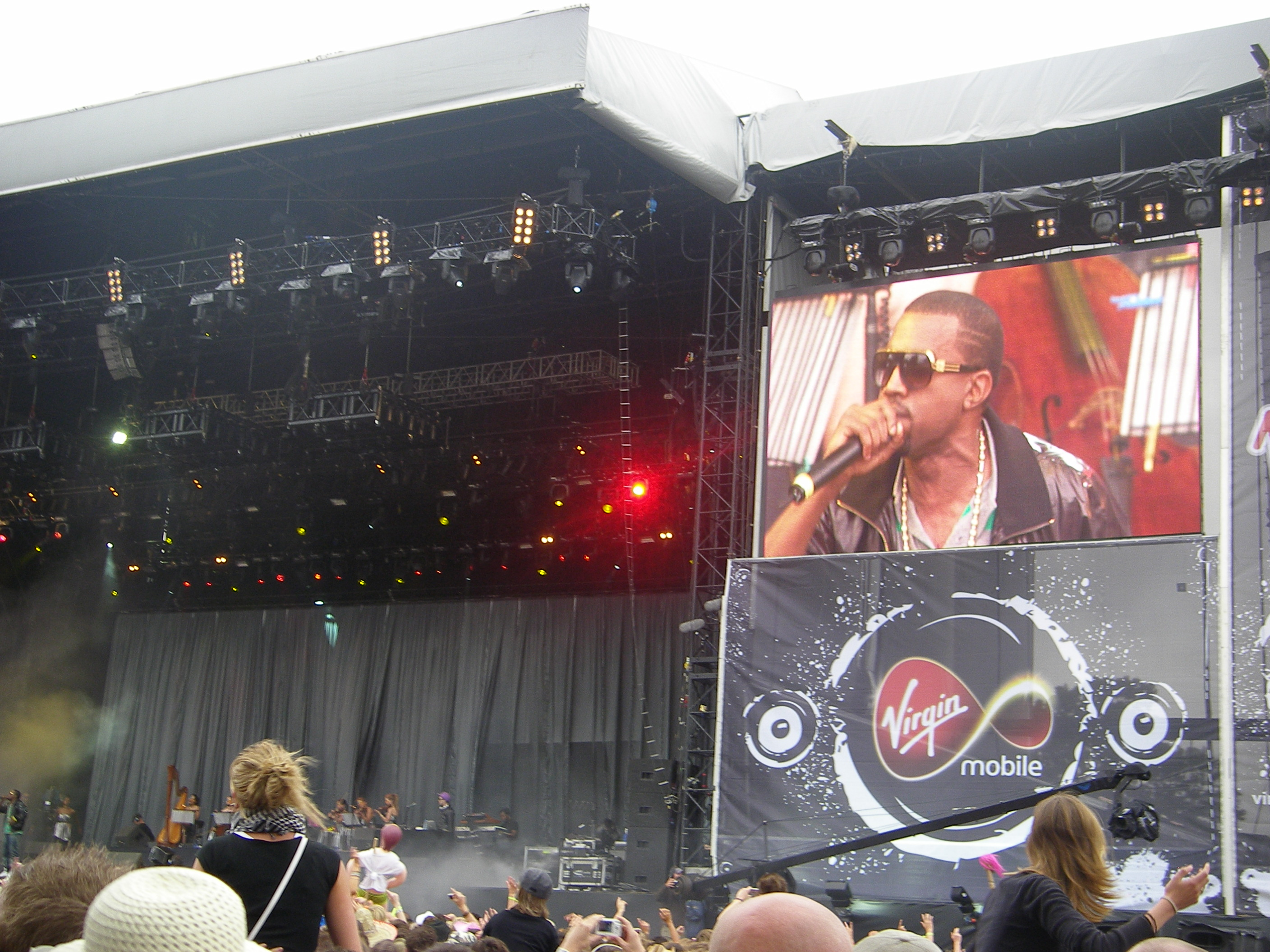
West performing before a crowd at V Festival on August 18, 2007, in Chelmsford, England.

West spent a significant amount of time promoting Graduation during his trip to the United Kingdom. On August 17, West guest starred on the British comedy-variety show The Friday Night Project. He played preview versions of the songs "Big Brother" and "Champion" from his forthcoming third album while making an appearance on DJ Tim Westwood's radio show on August 18. Later that day, West performed at V Festival in Chelmsford, England before an audience of over 50,000 people and again played new material from Graduation as well as a tribute cover of Amy Winehouse's hit single "Rehab". He then held a secret concert with Barbadian singer Rihanna for an audience of over five hundred fans and invited guests at Westminster Central Hall in London, England on August 20. The guests were greeted by staff members wearing graduation robes and mortarboard caps in reference to the title of West's third studio album Graduation. At the end of the concert, a shower of silver confetti and ticker tape reading Touch the Sky fell from the ceiling onto the audience while the actual "Touch the Sky", which was the fourth single from Late Registration, was played on the speakers.

After he returned to the United States, West joined 50 Cent onstage for a surprise performance before an audience of over 20,000 people at a show held on August 22 in Madison Square Garden during Ciara and T.I.'s Screamfest '07 tour. West performed for a benefit concert raising funds for and promoting higher education sponsored by his charity foundation on August 24 at Chicago's House of Blues. At the concert, he provided live renditions of songs from Graduation and gave the audience a sneak peek of the early production stages of his fall Glow in the Dark Tour. On August 28, West hosted a studio album listening session for Graduation at New World Stages in New York City. There, West explained his influences and aspirations for the album and played songs over video clips taken from a variety of futuristic sci-fi films, including Tron, Akira, 2046, and 2001: A Space Odyssey. Two days later, on the morning of August 30, the clean version of the album leaked onto the Internet. In a survey conducted by Billboard, results displayed that an estimated 44% of readers predicted that Graduation would sell more units over 50 Cent and Kenny Chesney. Projections for first week scans based on early store sales reports indicated towards the 575,000–700,000 range for Graduation, while Curtis was projected in the 500,000–600,000 range. West and 50 Cent appeared on a 106 & Park special titled: "Kanye West vs. 50 Cent: The Clash of the Titans", which aired on September 11. They both performed, had solo interviews, and a joint interview. The episode was the second-highest viewed music series telecast in BET history behind 106 & Park's tribute to Aaliyah in 2001.

== Commercial performance ==
It's a great promotional tool. To me, it's the greatest thing ever. I think people should do it more often. I'm a fan of both albums. Hip-hop needs this right now.

— Timbaland, on the sales competition between West's Graduation and 50 Cent's Curtis.

On the first day of its release, Graduation sold over 437,000 copies. The album debuted at number one on the US Billboard 200 chart, grossing a total of over 957,000 copies in its first week in the United States alone. Graduation became West's second consecutive studio album to top the Billboard 200 and also debuted at number-one on the album charts in the United Kingdom and Canada. It was within the very same week that "Stronger" topped the Billboard Hot 100, selling over 205,000 digital downloads and giving West his third number-one single. The album registered the best first-week sales totals of any record released within the last two years, with the last being West's own Late Registration.

Additionally, Graduation became ranked as the 15th highest sales week for an album since Nielsen SoundScan began tracking data in 1991, as well as the highest sales week at the time of its release for an album since 50 Cent's The Massacre (2005). It also set the record for the largest week of an album digitally downloaded, registering over 133,000 paid downloads, beating Maroon 5's previous set record of 102,000 for It Won't Be Soon Before Long. Graduation's first week sales of 957,000 and Curtis's first week sales of 691,000 marked only the second time ever since the inception of Nielsen SoundScan that two albums debuted within the same week with totals surpassing 623,000 copies in the United States. The first occurrence of such an event was in September 1991, when Guns N' Roses conjunctively released Use Your Illusion I, which sold 685,000 copies, and Use Your Illusion II, which sold 770,000 copies. The first week sales totals of Graduation and Curtis have outsold the first week sales totals of Guns N' Roses' two albums. 50 Cent showed graciousness in regards to his defeat. In a statement released to the Associated Press, he said, "I am very excited to have participated in one of the biggest album release weeks in the last two years. Collectively, we have sold hundreds of thousands of units in our debut week. This marks a great moment for hip-hop music, one that will go down in history". After years of slumping sales, the album competition between the two releases and the resulting record breaking performances both albums demonstrated was considered to be a "fantastic day for hip-hop".

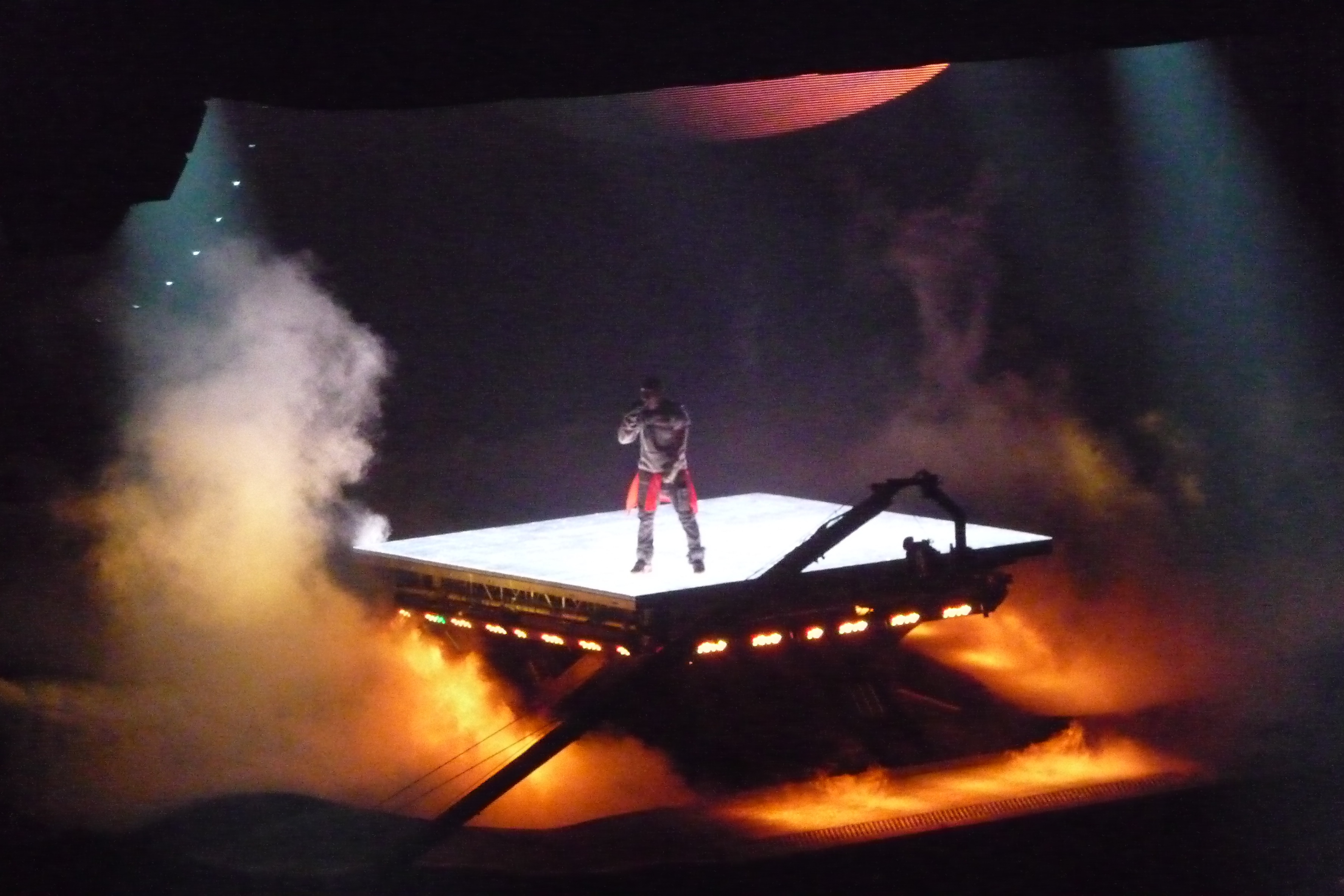
West performing at the United Center in Chicago on the album's supporting tour.

In its second week on the Billboard 200, Graduation outsold Curtis, 226,000 copies to 143,000. By the next week, on October 3, 2007, the former had sold a total of 1.3 million copies in the US. By year's end, Graduation was the third most-downloaded and best-selling album of 2007 on iTunes Store. Graduation became West's third consecutive studio album to sell over 2 million copies in the United States, and it was certified octuple platinum by the Recording Industry Association of America (RIAA) for shipping 8 million copies on July 17, 2026. As of June 14, 2013, Nielsen Soundscan reported that the album has since grossed over 2.7 million copies in the US. The 957,000 copies sold in the first week of Graduation's release stood as the sixth largest first week sales in hip-hop history up to January 7, 2019.

In the United Kingdom, Graduation debuted at number-one on the UK Albums Chart dated September 22, 2007. As of August 9, 2024, the album has been certified triple platinum by the British Phonographic Industry (BPI), with sales of 900,000 copies in the UK. In 2018, Official Charts Company revealed that Graduation was the 25th highest-selling rap album in the UK in the 21st century, and in 2026 it was revealed to be the fourth most streamed 2000s album in the UK. For the issue date of September 20, 2007, Graduation debuted atop the Canadian Albums Chart. On January 10, 2008, the album was certified double platinum by Music Canada for sales of 200,000 copies.

== Critical reception ==
Graduation ratings
Aggregate scores
Source	Rating
Metacritic	79/100
Review scores
Source	Rating
AllMusic	4/5 stars
The A.V. Club	B+
Entertainment Weekly	B−
The Guardian	4/5 stars
Los Angeles Times	3.5/4 stars
MSN Music (Consumer Guide)	A−
NME	6/10
Pitchfork	8.7/10
Rolling Stone	4.5/5 stars
Spin	4/5 stars

According to the review aggregator Metacritic, Graduation received "generally favorable reviews" based on a weighted average score of 79 out of 100 from 32 critic scores.

Reviewing for Spin in November 2007, Charles Aaron hailed Graduation as "mesmerizing and alienating, like all the purest forms of pop culture", with music in the tradition of Puff Daddy's late 1990s pop-rap, but more skilled: "Its music is a rush of designer adrenaline, its personality insatiable self-justification. It's the paradigm ya love to hate". Pitchfork critic Mark Pytlik complimented the accessibility of West's sonic experimentations, finding it impressive and innovative how he assembled seemingly disparate elements on the songs. Greg Tate, writing in The Village Voice, dubbed him "the most genuinely confessional MC in hip-hop today" and said, "bouts of narcissism aside, Graduation contains killer pieces of production". Stylus Magazine's Jayson Greene said it "serves as a document of West's maturation" and, "musically, at least, it's the most accomplished thing he's ever done". In Rolling Stone, Nathan Brackett wrote of West's evolving and increasingly experimental, genre-bending production and said although he lacks Jay-Z's "formal mastery", West has "grown as a writer ... given the lousy year hip-hop has had, the music needs his spazzed-out, neurotic creativity more than ever". Josh Tyrangiel from Time wrote, "West plunders the best [samples] and meticulously layers every track with enough surprises that there are thrills and discoveries a dozen listens in".

Some reviewers were more qualified in their praise. For MSN Music, Robert Christgau deemed Graduation a "minor success" in which "every single track offers up its momentary pleasures—choruses that make you say yeah on songs you've already found wanting, confessional details and emotional aperçus on an album that still reduces to quality product when they're over". However, he felt West spent too much of the album rationalizing his obsession with his fame in sketchy fashion and occasionally awkward rhymes, "little stuff like his failure to convert 'this'-'crib'-'shit'-'live'-'serious' into a rhyme" on "Champion" or "'at bay at a distance' into an idiom" on "Big Brother". Dorian Lynskey from The Guardian said West often "undercuts rap cliches with wit and ambivalence", but observed some disappointing lyrics such as on "Can't Tell Me Nothing", which he said revealed his limited perspective. Slant Magazine critic Eric Henderson found West's lyrics "only transparently expressive", saying that the songs' hooks "grab your ear on the first listen (notably bypassing your brain), your balls on the second, and your soul from there on out", and described West's production as having "adopted a beefy, synth-glam sheen". Dave Heaton from PopMatters felt that though the album is good, it lacks the epochal feel of Late Registration, with songs that "aren't as richly dressed" and he claimed that West "doesn't seem to be trying as hard".

=== Rankings ===
Graduation was named to year-end lists for 2007 by multiple publications. USA Today ranked it as the best album of the year, with the staff lauding the "musical and thematic variety" as well as "its articulate and witty rhyming". The album was picked by readers of Entertainment Weekly as the best of 2007, receiving 41 percent of the votes on the magazine's year-end poll. Graduation was listed by Amazon, My List Pad, and PopMatters as the third best album of the year, while it was also selected as one of 2007's top five albums by Blender, LAS Magazine, Rolling Stone, and Spin. The album was voted in at number six on The Village Voice's Pazz & Jop poll of the year, receiving 91 mentions. On the Idolator poll for 2007, which surveyed 452 critics, Graduation was ranked at number eight.

Graduation later appeared on numerous other best albums lists. Pitchfork listed the album at number 87 on their ranking of the best albums of the 2000s, and Complex placed it at number 2 on their list. Rolling Stone listed Graduation at number 45, and it finished second on its readers list. Complex ranked the album at number one on their list of the 100 Best Albums of the Complex Decade (2002–2012). Graduation was later included on Rolling Stone's 500 Greatest Albums of All Time list, landing at 204 on the 2020 update. It also appeared at 470 on NME's The 500 Greatest Albums of All Time 2013 list.

Rankings for Graduation
Publication	Accolade	Rank	Ref.
Amazon	Top 10 Albums of 2007	3	
Billboard	2007 Billboard Critics' Choice poll	8	
Blender	Top 10 Albums of 2007	4	
Cleveland Magazine	The Best Albums of 2007	6	
Complex	The 100 Best Albums of the Complex Decade (2002–2012)	1	
Complex	The 100 Best Albums of the 2000s	2	
Consequence of Sound	Top 50 Albums of 2007	8	
Entertainment Weekly	2007 Readers Picks	1	
Idolator	Idolator's 2007 Pop Critics Poll	8	
LAS Magazine	Top 10 Albums of 2007	5	
The Morning News	The Top 10 Albums of 2007	8	
My List Pad	Top Music Albums of 2007	3	
NME	500 Greatest Albums of All Time	470	
NPR	Best Hip-Hop of 2007	3	
Paste	Top 100 Albums of 2007	15	
Pitchfork	The 50 Best Albums of 2007	18	
Pitchfork	The 200 Best Albums of the 2000s	87	
PopMatters	The Albums of 2007	3	
Prefix	Top 10 Albums of 2007	6	
Rolling Stone	Top 50 Albums of 2007	5	
Rolling Stone	100 Best Albums of the 2000s	45	
Rolling Stone	500 Greatest Albums of All Time	204	
Spin	The 40 Best Albums of 2007	4	
Stylus Magazine	Top 10 Albums of 2007	6	
Thought Catalog	Top 27 Rap Albums of 2007	2	
Time	Top 10 Albums of 2007	10	
Time Out	The Best Albums of 2007 (Mike Wolf's List)	7	
Treblezine	Top 10 Hip-hop Albums of 2007	2	
USA Today	USA TODAY's Music Staff Year Review	1	
The Village Voice	The 2007 Pazz & Jop Critics Poll	6	

=== Industry awards ===
Graduation won the award of Favorite Rap/Hip-Hop Album at the American Music Awards of 2008, while also counting towards West earning the award for Favorite Rap/Hip-Hop Artist. With his two wins at the ceremony, West was the second biggest winner, behind Chris Brown with three awards to his name. West told the crowd during his acceptance speech that despite winning the Favorite Rap/Hip-Hop Album award, he wanted to give the award to Lil Wayne instead. Though this stands as one of the multiple times that West has given an award of his to someone else, West also has a frequent history of complaining when he does not win an award.

At the 50th Annual Grammy Awards, Graduation won the award for Best Rap Album, becoming West's third consecutive album to do so. The album was also nominated for Album of the Year at the ceremony, making West the only artist in Grammy history to receive a nomination for the award from all of their first three studio albums. West claimed in an interview that he felt confident towards Graduation winning the award. The album was considered the favorite to win Album of the Year, and its failure to win was considered by many publications to be a snub. At the same ceremony, "Stronger" and "Good Life" were awarded Best Rap Solo Performance and Best Rap Song, respectively. The latter also received a nomination for Best Rap/Sung Collaboration, while "Can't Tell Me Nothing" was nominated for Best Rap Song. The six awards that the album led to West contending for at the 50th Annual Grammy Awards were among his total of eight nominations for the ceremony, making West the most nominated music artist of that show. Graduation was a contender for numerous other industry awards.

Awards and nominations for Graduation
Year	Organization	Award	Result	Ref.
2007	HipHopDX Awards	Album of the Year	Won	
2008	American Music Awards	Favorite Rap/Hip-Hop Album	Won	
2008	BET Hip Hop Awards	CD of the Year	Nominated	
2008	ECHO Music Awards	Album of the Year Hip-Hop / R&B	Nominated	
2008	Grammy Awards	Album of the Year	Nominated	
2008	Grammy Awards	Best Rap Album	Won	
2008	Fonogram Hungarian Music Awards	Best Foreign Rap or Hip-Hop Album of the Year	Won	
2008	NAACP Image Awards	Outstanding Album	Nominated	
2008	Swiss Music Awards	Best Album Urban International	Nominated	

== Legacy ==
The sales battle [between Curtis and Graduation] serves as the final battle, the winner-take-all rumble between the present (thug rap) and the future (alternative rap) for rap supremacy. The fact that Graduation was both the bigger commercial and critical success was the death knell for thug rap, and correspondingly the Modernist movement of hip-hop. When it came down to it, an album with a track titled 'I'll Still Kill' couldn't compete with a song sampling a French dance duo's unknown hit. By choosing Kanye over 50 Cent in 2007, we were saying that we had gotten bored by gangsta rap and all of its cheap imitators; we were ready for something new, and Kanye thus became one of the pioneers of hip-hop's postmodern movement.

— Andrew Doscas, PopMatters (2014)

The critical reception and commercial success of Graduation left a profound influence on both hip-hop culture and popular music. West has earned praise for his ability to appeal to diverse music audiences such as indie-rock listeners and rave enthusiasts without alienating his core hip-hop audiences. Collaborative tracks such as "Homecoming" signaled the diversification of mainstream hip-hop and its intertwining with the genres of alternative rock and indie-rock in subsequent years. In addition, songs such as "Everything I Am" have been cited as "the best example of the soulful and introspective atmosphere that came to dominate the rap world, from Drake to The Weeknd". Irish rock band U2 has imparted that touring with West on their Vertigo Tour in turn had a significant effect on their own music as well in regards to the band's twelfth studio album No Line on the Horizon (2009). Lead singer Bono elaborated that West's rapping inspired him to utilize more percussive consonants for his songwriting and vocal performance.

West's third studio album, particularly with its two hit singles "Stronger" and "Flashing Lights", has been attributed to not only encouraging other hip-hop artists to incorporate house and electronica elements into their music, but also for playing a role in the revival of disco and electro-infused club music in the late-2000s. "Flashing Lights" was a leading part of a wave of synthesizer-driven music which combined danceable electro beats with an accessible pop format. It was succeeded by the high chart placings and multi-platinum sales of singles by artists and bands ranging from "Just Dance" (2008) by singer Lady Gaga to "Right Round" (2009) by rapper Flo Rida.

Graduation marked a musical progression towards synth-based production in regards to the art of crafting hip-hop beats. The studio album demonstrated West's shift from sample-orientated hip-hop production and more towards digital synths and drum machines generated by digital audio workstations (DAW). While samples are present throughout the album, they were fewer in number and not nearly as prominent. As hip-hop producer Anthony Kilhoffer recalled to Billboard in 2017 for Graduation's 10th anniversary, "I think it was the first time having a heavy hand in the use of electronic music in hip-hop. Previous to that it was very R&B influenced, tracks like 'Stronger' and 'Flashing Lights' contained very electronic type of elements. This was way before EDM became mainstream, and marked the end of the jersey-wearing era in hip-hop". Since Graduation's release, countless other record producers have followed suit in blurring the lines of conventional hip-hop with the incorporation of electronic production. This synth-driven production approach has since been adopted by artists including Future, Young Chop, and Metro Boomin.

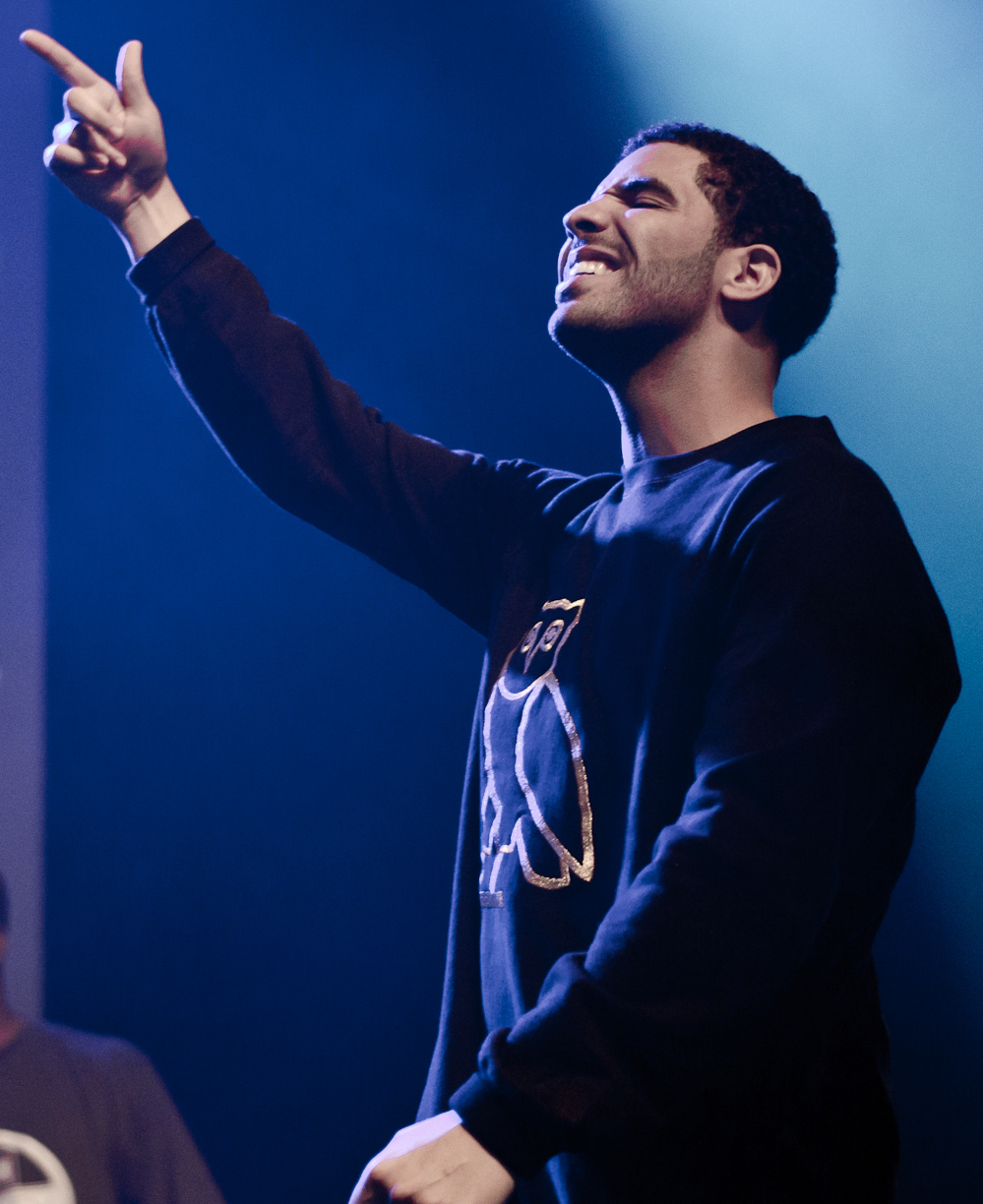
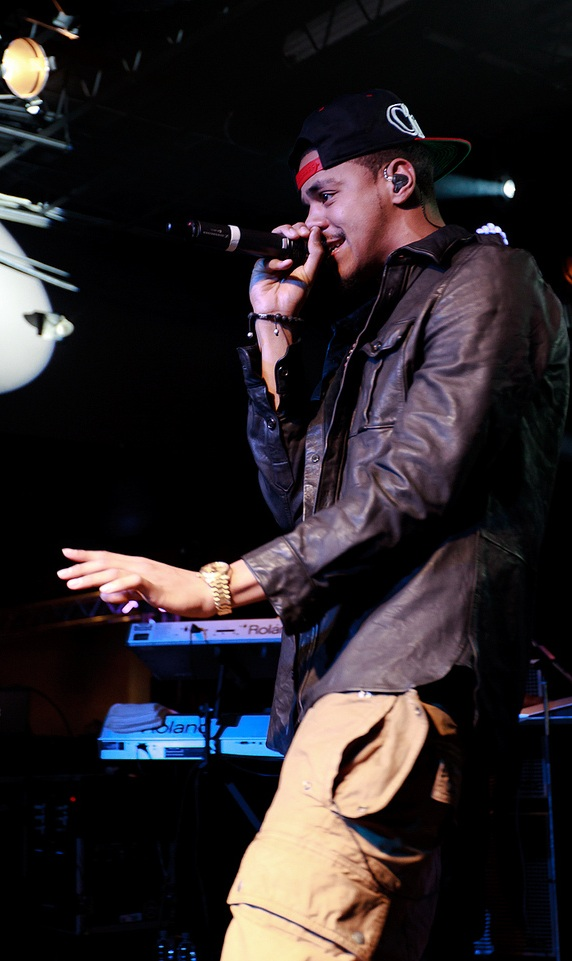
Graduation has been credited with paving the way for rappers, such as Drake (left) and J. Cole (right), to find mainstream success without conforming to gangsta rap conventions.

The outcome of the highly publicized sales competition between 50 Cent's Curtis and West's Graduation has been accredited to the commercial decline of the gangsta rap that once dominated mainstream hip-hop. Ben Detrick of XXL cites West beating 50 cent in sales as being responsible for altering the direction of hip-hop and paving the way for new rappers who did not follow the hardcore-gangster mold, writing, "If there was ever a watershed moment to indicate hip-hop's changing direction, it may have come when 50 Cent competed with Kanye in 2007 to see whose album would claim superior sales. Kanye led a wave of new artists— Kid Cudi, Wale, Lupe Fiasco, Kidz in the Hall, Drake—who lacked the interest or ability to create narratives about any past gunplay or drug-dealing". The Michigan Daily columnist Adam Theisen asserts that West's win once and for all "prove[d] that rap music didn't have to conform to gangsta-rap conventions to be commercially successful". Rolling Stone remarked that "While Kanye West's decisive triumph over 50 seems inevitable in retrospect, it's easy to forget how much of an underdog he was at the time. The College Dropout and Late Registration sold a combined 7 million copies in the U.., but 50 Cent's own first two albums, Get Rich or Die Trying and The Massacre, sold nearly 14 million, almost exactly twice as much. West had the last laugh: Graduation sold nearly 1 million copies in one week, and rap became the playground of emotional heroes like Kid Cudi, Lupe Fiasco, Drake, and J. Cole". In retrospect, Highsnobiety writer Shahzaib Hussain recognizes Graduation in West's opening trilogy of highly successful, education-themed albums that "cemented his role as a progressive rap progenitor".

Going further, Noah Callahan-Bever, chief content officer and editor-in-chief for Complex Media, marked September 11, 2007: "The Day Kanye West Killed Gangsta Rap". In a retrospective, Lawrence Burney of Noisey expands on this notion by asserting that the event caused the more aggressive forms of rap music to undergo an evolution. He continued writing, "Gangsta rap, street music, and the like have yet to recover from that showdown, as only two albums of the sort have gone platinum in the 2010s—Kevin Gates' Islah and Meek Mill's Dreams Worth More Than Money—If anything, street music has also made a shift since Kanye began to peal back more layers of himself on Graduation; 50's whole get up was about being an indestructible, emotionless robot. Now, what connects fans to artists like Gates and Meek is that they aren't afraid to rhythmically cry about lost loves ones and the price of fame". Likewise, Billboard wrote, "In 2007, Kanye West trumped 50 Cent in an epic sales battle, in which his opus Graduation trounced Curtis by several hundred thousand copies. Ye's emotive raps on Graduation, intertwined with his evolution on the production side, inspired a new wave of MCs to take notes. .. While gangsta rap still has a seat in the ever-expanding classroom of hip-hop, vulnerability and experimentation now serve as the leading candidates in creating your prototypical MC. Because of songs like 'I Wonder', 'Flashing Lights', and 'Stronger'", the hip-hop artists of today "cling on to Kanye's indomitable body of work like a go-to study guide". The competition between 50 Cent and West, when the two released their studio albums on the same day, was penultimate in a series of articles that lists fifty key events in the history of R&B and hip-hop music, written by Rosie Swash of The Guardian. Swash wrote that it "highlighted the diverging facets of hip-hop in the last decade; the former was gangsta rap for the noughties, while West was the thinking man's alternative".

Following Graduation's release, West became a frequent source of controversy for his conduct on social media and during interviews, including calling slavery in the United States "a choice" and making antisemitic statements. The catchphrase "he made Graduation" became a popular internet meme as fans attempted to rationalize West's controversies by reminding themselves he created one of the most beloved hip-hop albums. West acknowledged the meme in February 2025, when he ended a Twitter rant about wealth and power in the United States with "and I made Graduation".

== Track listing ==
Credits adapted from liner notes.

Graduation track listing
No.	Title	Writer(s)	Producer(s)	Length
1.	"Good Morning"	Kanye West; Elton John; Bernie Taupin	West	3:15
2.	"Champion"	West; Antony Williams; Walter Becker; Donald Fagen	Brian "AllDay" Miller; West^{[a]}	2:47
3.	"Stronger"	West; Thomas Bangalter; Guy-Manuel de Homem-Christo; Edwin Birdsong	West; Mike Dean^{[c]}	5:12
4.	"I Wonder"	West; Labi Siffre	West	4:03
5.	"Good Life" (featuring T-Pain)	West; Faheem Najm; Aldrin Davis; John Stephens; Quincy Jones; James Ingram	West; DJ Toomp; Dean^{[b]}	3:27
6.	"Can't Tell Me Nothing"	West; Connie Mitchell; Davis	West; Toomp	4:31
7.	"Barry Bonds" (featuring Lil Wayne)	West; Dominick Lamb; Dwayne Carter, Jr.; Norman Landsberg; John Ventura; Leslie Weinstein; Felix Pappalardi	Nottz; West^{[a]}	3:24
8.	"Drunk and Hot Girls" (featuring Mos Def)	West; Irmin Schmidt; Michael Karoli; Jaki Liebezeit; Kenji Suzuki; Holger Schuering	West; Jon Brion^{[b]}; Dean^{[d]}	5:13
9.	"Flashing Lights" (featuring Dwele)	West; Eric Hudson	West; Hudson	3:57
10.	"Everything I Am" (featuring scratches by DJ Premier)	West; Christopher Martin; Prince Phillip Mitchell; Carlton Ridenhour; Eric Sadler; Hank Shocklee; George Clinton, Jr.	West	3:47
11.	"The Glory"	West; Dante Smith; Laura Nyro; Landsberg; Pappalardi; Ventura; Weinstein	West; Gee Roberson^{[a]}; Patrick "Plain Pat" Reynolds^{[a]}	3:32
12.	"Homecoming" (featuring Chris Martin)	West; Chris Martin; Warryn Campbell	West; Warryn "Baby Dubb" Campbell	3:23
13.	"Big Brother"	West; Davis	Toomp	4:47
Total length:				51:23

iTunes, Australia, and Spotify bonus track
No.	Title	Writer(s)	Producer(s)	Length
14.	"Good Night" (featuring Al Be Back and Mos Def)	West; Albert Daniels; Jason T. Miller; Arthur Reid; Ewart Beckford; William Maragh	West; J. Miller; Al Be Back	3:07
Total length:				54:30

Alternative Business Partners bonus track
No.	Title	Writer(s)	Producer(s)	Length
14.	"Can't Tell Me Nothing" (remix featuring Young Jeezy)	West; Mitchell; Davis	West; Toomp	4:08
Total length:				55:31

United Kingdom bonus tracks
No.	Title	Writer(s)	Producer(s)	Length
14.	"Good Night" (featuring Al Be Back and Mos Def)	West; Daniels; J. Miller; Reid; Beckford; Maragh	West; J. Miller; Al Be Back	3:06
15.	"Stronger" (A-Trak Remix)	West; Bangalter; de Homem-Christo; Birdsong	West	4:34
Total length:				59:03

Japanese bonus tracks
No.	Title	Writer(s)	Producer(s)	Length
14.	"Good Night" (featuring Al Be Back and Mos Def)	West; Daniels; J. Miller; Reid; Beckford; Maragh	West; J. Miller; Al Be Back	3:06
15.	"Bittersweet Poetry" (featuring John Mayer)	West; John Mayer	West	4:01
Total length:				58:30

France and Spotify bonus tracks
No.	Title	Writer(s)	Producer(s)	Length
14.	"Stronger" (A-Trak Remix)	West; Bangalter; de Homem-Christo; Birdsong	West	4:34
15.	"Stronger" (AD Remix Main)	West; Bangalter; de Homem-Christo; Birdsong	West	4:48
Total length:				60:45

Notes:

- ^{^[a]} – co-production
- ^{^[b]} – additional production
- ^{^[c]} – extended outro co-production
- ^{^[d]} – bridge section

Sample credits:

- "Good Morning" contains samples from "Someone Saved My Life Tonight" performed by Elton John.
- "Champion" contains elements of "Kid Charlemagne" performed by Steely Dan.
- "Stronger" contains a sample of "Harder, Better, Faster, Stronger" performed by Daft Punk and master use of "Cola Bottle Baby" performed by Edwin Birdsong.
- "I Wonder" contains a sample from "My Song" performed by Labi Siffre.
- "Good Life" contains a sample of "P.Y.T. (Pretty Young Thing)" performed by Michael Jackson.
- "Barry Bonds" contains a sample of "Long Red" performed by Mountain.
- "Drunk and Hot Girls" contains elements of "Sing Swan Song" performed by Can.
- "Everything I Am" contains elements of "If We Can't Be Lovers" performed by Prince Phillip Mitchell and "Bring the Noise" performed by Public Enemy.
- "The Glory" contains elements of "Save the Country" performed by Laura Nyro and contains a sample of "Long Red" performed by Mountain.
- "Homecoming" interpolates "I Used to Love H.E.R." performed by Common.
- "Good Night" contains elements of "Nuff Man a Dead" performed by Super Cat and "Wake the Town" performed by U-Roy.
- "Bittersweet Poetry" interpolates "Bittersweet" performed by Chairmen of the Board.

== Personnel ==
Credits are adapted from liner notes.

- Kanye West – executive producer, vocals, primary artist (all tracks), producer (all tracks except 13)
- Lil Wayne – featured artist (track 7)
- Mos Def – featured artist (track 8), backing vocals (8, 11)
- T-Pain – featured artist (track 5)
- Dwele – featured artist (track 9)
- DJ Premier – featured artist, DJ scratching (track 10)
- Young Jeezy – rap vocals (track 6)
- Jay-Z – executive producer, additional rap vocals (track 1)
- Chris Martin – additional vocals (sung by) (track 12), piano (track 12)
- Connie Mitchell – additional vocals (tracks 1–2, 6, 9)
- Tanya Herron – additional vocals (track 8)
- John Legend – backing vocals (tracks 5, 11)
- Ne-Yo – backing vocals (track 5)
- Jalil Williams – additional backing vocals (track 11)
- Jehireh Williams – additional backing vocals (track 11)
- Daphne Chen – violin (tracks 5, 8)
- Eric Gorfain – violin (tracks 5, 8)
- Luigi Mazzocchi – violin (tracks 4, 9)
- Charles Parker – violin (tracks 4, 9)
- Igor Szwec – violin (tracks 4, 9)
- Emma Kummrow – violin (tracks 4, 9)
- Olga Konopelsky – violin (tracks 4, 9)
- Gloria Justen – violin (tracks 4, 9)
- Peter Nocella – viola (tracks 4, 9)
- Leah Katz – viola (tracks 5, 8)
- Alexandra Leem – viola (tracks 4, 9)
- Alma Fernandez – viola (track 5)
- Wired Strings – string section performed by (track 11)
- Gus Dudgeon – producer (track 1)
- DJ Toomp – producer (tracks 5, 6, 13, 14)
- Mike Dean – keyboards (track 3, 7), music arranger (3), string arrangements (5, 8), recording engineer (3), guitar (3), mixing (5–8, 10, 12), producer (3, 5)
- Jon Brion – keyboards (track 4), percussion (12), record producer (8)
- Darryl Beaton – keyboards (track 6)
- Andy Chatterley – keyboards (tracks 1, 3, 8, 11)
- Chris Rob – keyboards (track 6)
- Richard Dodd – cello (tracks 5, 8)
- John Krovoza – cello (track 5)
- Jennie Lorenzo – cello (tracks 4, 9)
- Tim Resler – bass (tracks 4, 9)
- Vincent "Biggs" James – bass guitar (track 7)
- Omar Edwards – piano (tracks 4–5, 10), keyboards (3, 11) synthesizer (4–5, 8), synthesizer bass (8)
- Nottz Raw – producer (track 7), recording engineer (track 7)
- Tony Rey – recording engineer (track 6)
- Seiji Sekine – recording engineer (track 3)
- Greg Koller – recording engineer (tracks 4, 8, 12)
- Bruce Buechner – recording engineer (track 12)
- Andrew Dawson – recording engineer (all tracks), mixing (tracks 2, 4–6, 9, 12–13)
- Anthony Kilhoffer – recording engineer (tracks 1–6, 9–12), mixing (1, 11)
- Anthony Palazzole – assistant recording engineer (track 2, 5–10, 12)
- Andy Marcinkowski – assistant recording engineer (tracks 2, 5–10, 12–13)
- Richard Reitz – assistant recording engineer (tracks 3, 6)
- Jared Robbins – assistant recording engineer (track 3)
- Kengo Sakura – assistant recording engineer (track 3)
- Bram Tobey – assistant recording engineer (tracks 1–6, 8, 10–11)
- Matty Green – assistant recording engineer (tracks 1, 9, 11–12)
- Nate Hertweck – assistant recording engineer (tracks 1–6, 10–11)
- Jason Agel – assistant recording engineer (tracks 1–6, 8, 10–11)
- Keke Smith – production coordination for DJ Toomp (tracks 5, 6, 13, 14)
- Tracey Waples – marketing
- Al Brancch – marketing
- Takashi Murakami – artwork
- Carol Corless – package production
- Eric Hudson – all other instruments (track 9), producer (9)
- Warryn Campbell – producer (track 12)
- Larry Gold – string arrangements, string conductor (tracks 4, 9)
- Rosie Danvers – string arrangements (track 11)
- Sandra Campbell – project coordinator
- Sean Cooper – sound designer (track 12)
- Tommy D – string section producer (track 11)
- Vlado Meller – mastering
- Terese Joseph – A&R
- Kyambo Joshua – executive producer
- Manny Marroquin – mixing (track 3)
- Kazuhiro Mizuno – design
- Patrick "Plain Pat" Reynolds – A&R, producer (track 11)
- Timbaland – additional drum machine (track 5), additional music programming (3)

== Charts ==
=== Weekly charts ===
Weekly chart performance
Chart (2007)	Peak position
Australian Albums (ARIA)	2
Australian Urban Albums (ARIA)	1
Austrian Albums (Ö3 Austria)	26
Belgian Albums (Ultratop Flanders)	11
Belgian Albums (Ultratop Wallonia)	49
Canadian Albums (Billboard)	1
Danish Albums (Hitlisten)	10
Dutch Albums (Album Top 100)	11
European Albums (Billboard)	3
Finnish Albums (Suomen virallinen lista)	16
French Albums (SNEP)	9
German Albums (Offizielle Top 100)	10
Greek Albums (IFPI)	6
Irish Albums (IRMA)	2
Italian Albums (FIMI)	33
Japanese Albums (Oricon)	12
New Zealand Albums (RMNZ)	2
Norwegian Albums (VG-lista)	2
Portuguese Albums (AFP)	30
Scottish Albums (Official Charts)	2
Swedish Albums (Sverigetopplistan)	6
Swedish Hip-Hop Albums (Sverigetopplistan)	1
Swiss Albums (Schweizer Hitparade)	3
Taiwanese Albums (Five Music)	5
UK Albums (Official Charts)	1
UK R&B Albums (Official Charts)	1
US Billboard 200	1
US Top R&B/Hip-Hop Albums (Billboard)	1

Weekly chart performance
Chart (2017–2026)	Peak position
Canadian Albums (Billboard)	144
Hungarian Albums (MAHASZ)	32
Icelandic Albums (Tónlistinn)	5
Lithuanian Albums (AGATA)	37
Polish Albums (ZPAV)	39
US Billboard 200	115
US Top Catalog Albums (Billboard)	15

=== Year-end charts ===
Year-end chart performance
Chart (2007)	Position
Australian Albums (ARIA)	88
European Albums (Billboard)	75
Swiss Albums (Schweizer Hitparade)	93
UK Albums (OCC)	59
US Billboard 200	12
US Top R&B/Hip-Hop Albums (Billboard)	4
Worldwide Charts (IFPI)	17

Year-end chart performance
Chart (2008)	Position
Australian Urban Albums (ARIA)	19
UK Albums (OCC)	121
US Billboard 200	79
US Top R&B/Hip-Hop Albums (Billboard)	29

Year-end chart performance
Chart (2016)	Position
US Billboard 200	157

Year-end chart performance
Chart (2017)	Position
Australian Urban Albums (ARIA)	82

Year-end chart performance
Chart (2018)	Position
Australian Urban Albums (ARIA)	78

Year-end chart performance
Chart (2019)	Position
Australian Urban Albums (ARIA)	70

Year-end chart performance
Chart (2020)	Position
Icelandic Albums (Tónlistinn)	78

Year-end chart performance
Chart (2021)	Position
Belgian Albums (Ultratop Flanders)	140
Danish Albums (Hitlisten)	87
Icelandic Albums (Tónlistinn)	31
US Billboard 200	130

Year-end chart performance
Chart (2022)	Position
Belgian Albums (Ultratop Flanders)	91
Danish Albums (Hitlisten)	67
Icelandic Albums (Tónlistinn)	14
Lithuanian Albums (AGATA)	36
Swedish Albums (Sverigetopplistan)	90
US Billboard 200	67
US Top R&B/Hip-Hop Albums (Billboard)	39

Year-end chart performance
Chart (2023)	Position
Australian Albums (ARIA)	61
Belgian Albums (Ultratop Flanders)	58
Belgian Albums (Ultratop Wallonia)	190
Canadian Albums (Billboard)	50
Danish Albums (Hitlisten)	36
Dutch Albums (Album Top 100)	44
Hungarian Albums (MAHASZ)	97
Icelandic Albums (Tónlistinn)	9
New Zealand Albums (RMNZ)	18
Swedish Albums (Sverigetopplistan)	37
Swiss Albums (Schweizer Hitparade)	66
UK Albums (OCC)	54
US Billboard 200	58
US Top R&B/Hip-Hop Albums (Billboard)	25

Year-end chart performance
Chart (2024)	Position
Australian Albums (ARIA)	30
Australian Hip Hop/R&B Albums (ARIA)	6
Austrian Albums (Ö3 Austria)	58
Belgian Albums (Ultratop Flanders)	30
Belgian Albums (Ultratop Wallonia)	135
Canadian Albums (Billboard)	46
Danish Albums (Hitlisten)	43
Dutch Albums (Album Top 100)	35
Hungarian Albums (MAHASZ)	59
Icelandic Albums (Tónlistinn)	17
Swedish Albums (Sverigetopplistan)	36
Swiss Albums (Schweizer Hitparade)	19
UK Albums (OCC)	50
US Billboard 200	59
US Top R&B/Hip-Hop Albums (Billboard)	19

Year-end chart performance
Chart (2025)	Position
Australian Albums (ARIA)	50
Austrian Albums (Ö3 Austria)	49
Belgian Albums (Ultratop Flanders)	45
Belgian Albums (Ultratop Wallonia)	165
Dutch Albums (Album Top 100)	49
Hungarian Albums (MAHASZ)	60
Icelandic Albums (Tónlistinn)	29
Swedish Albums (Sverigetopplistan)	42
Swiss Albums (Schweizer Hitparade)	24
UK Albums (OCC)	75
US Billboard 200	90
US Top R&B/Hip-Hop Albums (Billboard)	30

== Certifications ==
Certifications and sales
Region	Certification	Certified units/sales
Australia (ARIA)	3× Platinum	210,000^{‡}
Canada (Music Canada)	2× Platinum	200,000^{^}
Denmark (IFPI Danmark)	5× Platinum	100,000^{‡}
Germany (BVMI)	Gold	100,000^{‡}
Iceland (FHF)	Gold	2,500
Ireland (IRMA)	Platinum	15,000^{^}
Italy (FIMI)	Platinum	50,000^{‡}
Japan (RIAJ)	Gold	100,000^{^}
New Zealand (RMNZ)	5× Platinum	75,000^{‡}
Russia (NFPF)	Gold	10,000^{*}
Switzerland (IFPI Switzerland)	Gold	15,000^{^}
United Kingdom (BPI)	3× Platinum	900,000^{‡}
United States (RIAA)	8× Platinum	8,000,000^{‡}
^{*} Sales figures based on certification alone.^{^} Shipments figures based on certification alone.^{‡} Sales+streaming figures based on certification alone.

== See also ==
- 2007 in hip-hop
- Kanye West albums discography
- Kanye West production discography
- List of best-selling albums in the United States of the Nielsen SoundScan era
- List of number-one albums of 2007 (Canada)
- List of UK Albums Chart number ones of the 2000s
- List of UK R&B Albums Chart number ones of 2007
- List of Billboard 200 number-one albums of 2007
- List of Billboard number-one rap albums of 2007
- List of Billboard number-one R&B albums of 2007
