= Life in the Concrete Jungle =

Studio album by B.G. and Chopper City Boyz
- Released: September 16, 2008
- Genres: Southern hip-hop; gangsta rap
- Length: 1:06:05
- Labels: Chopper City; Asylum
- Producers: Adrian Watts; Bass Heavy; Coree Benton; Cozmo; Dani Kartel; HeartBeatz; Joe Blow CEO; Mark Levy; S-8ighty; Shape Shifter; Shawneci; X-Fyle

B.G. chronology
We Got This (2007)	Life in the Concrete Jungle (2008)	Too Hood 2 Be Hollywood (2009)

Chopper City Boyz chronology
We Got This (2007)	Life in the Concrete Jungle (2008)

Professional ratings
Review scores
Source	Rating
AllMusic	3.5/5 stars
RapReviews	6/10

Life in the Concrete Jungle is the second and final collaborative studio album by American rapper B.G. and Southern hip-hop group the Chopper City Boyz. Originally scheduled for an August 26 release, it was pushed back and released on September 16, 2008, through Chopper City Records with distribution via Asylum Records.

Production was handled by Bass Heavy, S-8ighty, X-Fyle, Adrian Watts, Coree Benton, Cozmo, Dani Kartel, HeartBeatz, Joe Blow CEO, Mark Levy, Shape Shifter and Shawneci, with B.G. and Carol A. Dorsey serving as executive producers.

It features guest appearances from Lady Dolla, 6 Shot, Alfa Mega, Blood Raw, C-Murder, Hurricane Chris, Lac, Rocko, Skip, and Don "The Show" Flamingo. Members VL Mike, who died in April 2008, and B.G.'s brother Hakizzle did not appear on the album.

In the United States, the album debuted at number 117 on the Billboard 200, number 12 on the Top R&B/Hip-Hop Albums and number 8 on the Top Rap Albums charts.

The first single off the album is "Bubblegum", which was produced by Joe Blow CEO.

== Track listing ==
No.	Title	Producer(s)	Length
1.	"Intro"	Bass Heavy	1:07
2.	"Never Look Back"	Dani Kartel	3:34
3.	"Keep It Real" (featuring Alfa Mega)	S-80	4:13
4.	"Bubblegum" (featuring Lady Dolla)	Joe Blow CEO	3:56
5.	"Don't Step on My White Feet" (featuring Lady Dolla and The Show)	Coree Benton	4:31
6.	"Bizness" (featuring Hurricane Chris)	Adrian Watts	4:14
7.	"Dealer" (featuring Lac)	Shawneci	4:45
8.	"Maintain"	Bass Heavy	2:50
9.	"My Life" (featuring Blood Raw)	Cozmo	3:39
10.	"Blow It"	S-80	4:05
11.	"I Like It"	Bass Heavy	3:17
12.	"Dick Suck"	X-Fyle	5:00
13.	"G.A."	Bass Heavy	3:31
14.	"Be Kool"	X-Fyle	4:37
15.	"M.O.E. (Money Over Everything)" (featuring Rocko and Six Shot)	HeartBeatz	4:24
16.	"Get Away Wit"	Shape Shifter	4:47
17.	"U Can Bleed Too" (featuring C-Murder and Skip)	Mark Levy	3:35
Total length:			1:06:05

== Personnel ==
- Christopher "B.G." Dorsey – vocals (tracks: 1–4, 7, 8, 11–14, 16), executive producer
- Vandell "Gar" Smith – vocals (tracks: 2–6, 8, 9, 11–17)
- Travis "Sniper" Edwards – vocals (tracks: 2–12, 14–16)
- Cedric "Alfamega" Zellars – vocals (track 3)
- Dawn "Lady Dolla" Harrington – vocals (tracks: 4, 5)
- Donald "Don 'The Show' Flamingo" Allen – vocals (track 5)
- Christopher "Hurricane Chris" Dooley – vocals (track 6)
- Kedrick "Lac" Moore – vocals (track 7)
- Bruce "Blood Raw" Falson – vocals (track 9)
- Rodney Ramone "Rocko" Hill Jr. – vocals (track 15)
- Jermaine "6 Shot" Tucker – vocals (track 15)
- Corey "C-Murder" Miller – vocals (track 17)
- Clifford "Skip" Nicholas – vocals (track 17)
- Roderick "Bass Heavy" Tillman – producer (tracks: 1, 8, 11, 13), mastering
- Daniel "Dani Kartel" Castillo – producer (track 2)
- Dave "S-8ighty" Welcome – producer (tracks: 3, 10)
- Joseph "Joe Blow CEO" Collins – producer (track 4)
- Coree Benton – producer (track 5)
- Adrian Watts – producer (track 6)
- Shawn "Shawneci" Raskin – producer (track 7)
- Cozmo Hickox – producer (track 9)
- Howard "X-Fyle" Metoyer – producer (tracks: 12, 14)
- Otis "HeartBeatz" Hinton – producer (track 15)
- Shape Shifter – producer (track 16)
- Mark Levy – producer (track 17)
- Carol A. Dorsey – executive producer

== Charts ==
Chart (2008)	Peak position
US Billboard 200	117
US Top R&B/Hip-Hop Albums (Billboard)	12
US Top Rap Albums (Billboard)	8
