= Wake the Town =

Single by U-Roy
- Released: 1970
- Genre: Reggae
- Songwriter(s): U-Roy, Reid

"Wake the Town" is a reggae song recorded by Jamaican toaster U-Roy in 1970. It was U-Roy's first big hit and one of the songs that established U-Roy as the grandfather of the modern deejay phenomenon. It also helped create dancehall style in Jamaica.

The recording that led to the single was initiated when John Holt attended a sound system party, and heard U-Roy deejay. Holt convinced U-Roy and producer Duke Reid to hook up, and have U-Roy talk-over some of Reid's Treasure Island rocksteady classics. U-Roy recorded "Wake the Town" (and another hit, "Rule the Nation"), using his talk-over style, from start to finish without any restarts.

"Wake the Town" quickly went to number one on Jamaica's pop music charts, along with "Rule the Nation" at number two, and many other deejays began to adopt his style. These two songs, along with "Wear You to the Ball", established U-Roy as a dancehall star and helped create the deejay sound. Dennis Alcapone said of the song, "When U-Roy come with 'Wake the Town' it's like a new Jamaica was born".

== Book ==
Wake the Town and Tell the People: Dancehall Culture in Jamaica is a book discussing the history of dancehall music in Jamaica by cultural anthropologist Norman Stolzoff.

== Sampling ==
"Wake the Town" was sampled in the 1994 songs "Omaha Stylee" by 311 and "You Don't Love Me (No, No, No)" by Dawn Penn. It was also sampled in the song "Good Night" by Kanye West on his album Graduation.
