= Terry Urban =

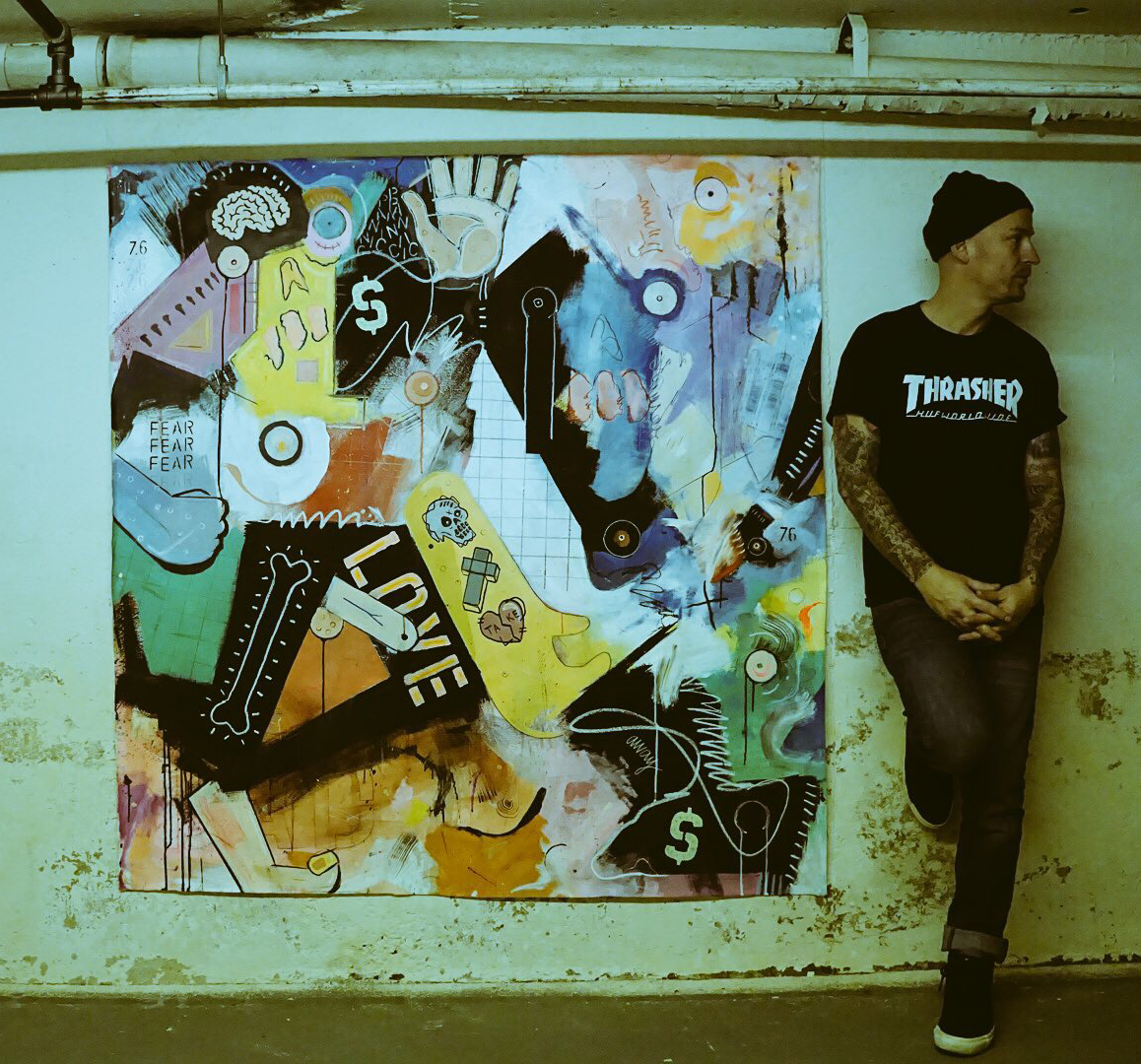
- Terry Urban standing by his painting

Background information
- Birth name: Terry Urban
- Born: May 23, 1977 (age 47)
- Genres: Hip hop
- Occupations: DJ; Producer
- Years active: 1996–present
- Website: http://www.terryurban.com

Terry Urban is an American artist, DJ and producer best known for the mixtapes Viva la Hova, Southerngold and Biggie Stardust.

== Biography ==
Terry Urban was born in Cleveland, Ohio on May 23, 1977. After graduating school he moved to San Diego, California to pursue a career in Skateboarding. It was in San Diego where Terry was first introduced to Turntablism. Urban moved back to his hometown of Cleveland and began to DJ and also paint graffiti. In 2004 he was hired to be a DJ on a local Cleveland radio station WENZ and then quickly after was hired as a DJ with his own show at Sirius Satellite Radio. Urban's career as a DJ began to flourish and he became less interested in graffiti. In 2006 Terry decided to pursue his career as DJ and moved to New York City. Terry began to work on music and started to produce his own remixes which have received accolades from such greats as Coldplay, Jay Z, Kanye West and Drake. In 2015 looking for another creative outlet, Urban began to paint once again. Over the past years, Terry Urban has completely immersed himself into his work and has exhibited his paintings in many solo shows.

== Music ==
Terry Urban has released mixtapes including "Unbelievable" (tribute to The Notorious B.I.G., hosted by P. Diddy), "The Graduate (hosted by Kanye West) and Viva La Hova, which mashed up Jay-Z and Coldplay. He released "Southerngold" in 2009 which mixed Santigold with music by contemporary southern rappers. The mixtape drew legal attention from Santigold's record label in the form of a cease and desist later. The mixtape album "Lady Stardust" put Lady Gaga songs together with David Bowie tracks.

== Art ==
Urban's style is most influenced by Abstract expressionism and Neo-expressionism, where he is not interested in an accurate execution of his subjects, but rather in exploring the possibilities of abstraction. In his early years, Urban was interested in art and began to paint graffiti. However, his music career as a DJ began to flourish and his painting took a back seat. Musically, Urban's DJ career has spanned over a decade but he was looking for a more creative outlet in life. In 2015, with advice from a close friend, Urban began to paint once again. Over the past years, Urban has completely immersed himself into his work and has exhibited his paintings in many solo shows.

== Exhibitions ==
-Solo Exhibition: Rhythmless, Dead Logic Gallery

-Solo Exhibition: To Live and Die, Lake Affect Studios

-Solo Exhibition: New York Wounds, Contra Gallery

-Solo Exhibition: To Whom It May Concern, The Storefront Project
