= We Got This (Chopper City Boyz album) =

Studio album by B.G. and the Chopper City Boyz
- Released: February 27, 2007
- Genre: Southern hip-hop; gangsta rap
- Length: 1:05:16
- Label: Chopper City; Koch
- Producer: 1 Track Mind Productions; Bass Heavy; Beat Doctor; Coree Benton; Crack Tracks; David Banner; Hush; K.I.D.D.; Tone-Tone

B.G. chronology
| The Heart of tha Streetz, Vol. 2 (I Am What I Am) (2006) | We Got This (2007) | Life in the Concrete Jungle (2008) |

Chopper City Boyz chronology
| We Got This (2007) | Life in the Concrete Jungle (2008) |

Professional ratings
Review scores
| Source | Rating |
|---|---|
| AllMusic | 3/5 stars |
| HipHopDX | 1.5/5 |
| RapReviews | 5/10 |
| Rolling Stone | 3/5 stars |
| XXL | 2/5 |

We Got This is the debut collaborative studio album by American rapper B.G. and Southern hip-hop group the Chopper City Boyz. It was released on February 27, 2007, via Chopper City/Koch Records.

Production was handled by K.I.D.D., Coree Benton, 1 Track Mind Productions, Bass Heavy, Beat Doctor, Crack Tracks, David Banner, Hush and Tone-Tone. It features guest appearances from Mercedes and Ziggler the Wiggler.

The album debuted at number 21 on the Billboard 200, number 4 on the Top R&B/Hip-Hop Albums, and number-one on both the Top Rap Albums and the Independent Albums charts, selling 27,000 copies in its first week in the United States.

== Track listing ==
| No. | Title | Writer(s) | Producer(s) | Length |
|---|---|---|---|---|
| 1. | "Intro" | Michael Dobard; Coree Benton; Leceto Garrett | Coree Benton | 2:54 |
| 2. | "Taking Over" | Hakim Abdul Dorsey; Travis Edwards; Michael Allen; Vandell Smith; Roderick Tillman | Bass Heavy | 5:06 |
| 3. | "Bounce" | H. Dorsey; Allen; Smith; Edwards; Tillman | Bass Heavy | 4:52 |
| 4. | "Make 'Em Mad" | H. Dorsey; Edwards; Allen; Smith; Christopher Noel Dorsey; Lavell Crump | David Banner | 4:26 |
| 5. | "Thorough Street Nigga" | Allen; Edwards; Smith; Andreas Stasinopoulos | Hush | 4:35 |
| 6. | "It's Real" | Allen; L. Parker | Crack Tracks | 4:20 |
| 7. | "What I Like About Her" | H. Dorsey; Edwards; Allen; Smith; C. Dorsey; Willie Reed | K.I.D.D. | 4:21 |
| 8. | "Flatliners" | Edwards; Allen; Smith; Benton; Garrett | Coree Benton | 4:07 |
| 9. | "Chopper City" | Smith; Reed | K.I.D.D. | 2:25 |
| 10. | "Never Had" | Allen; Smith; Edwards; Raequel Miller; M. Jones | 1 Track Mind Productions | 3:59 |
| 11. | "Knuckle Up" | Allen; Smith; C. Dorsey; Antonio Henderson | Tone-Tone | 2:28 |
| 12. | "Heart of a Killer" | Edwards; Reed | K.I.D.D. | 4:08 |
| 13. | "Going On" | H. Dorsey; Allen; C. Dorsey; Jones | 1 Track Mind Productions | 5:24 |
| 14. | "Crucial Shit" | H. Dorsey; Ronna Griffin | Beat Doctor | 4:39 |
| 15. | "Shake 'Em Off" | Smith; Edwards; Allen; Benton; Garrett | Coree Benton | 4:17 |
| 16. | "All Eyes on Me" | Smith; C. Dorsey; Reed | K.I.D.D. | 3:15 |
| Total length: | | | | 1:05:16 |

== Personnel ==
- Christopher "B.G." Dorsey – vocals (tracks: 4, 7, 13, 16), executive producer
- Hakim "Hakizzle" Dorsey – vocals (tracks: 2–4, 7, 13, 14)
- Travis "Sniper" Edwards – vocals (tracks: 2–5, 7, 8, 10–12, 15)
- Michael "VL Mike" Allen – vocals (tracks: 2–8, 10, 11, 13, 15)
- Vandell "Gar" Smith – vocals (tracks: 2–5, 7–11, 15, 16)
- Michael "Ziggler The Wiggler" Dobard – vocals (track 1)
- Raequel "Mercedes" Miller – vocals (track 10)
- Coree Benton – producer & mixing (tracks: 1, 8, 15)
- Roderick "Bass Heavy" Tillman – producer & engineering (tracks: 2, 3)
- Lavell "David Banner" Crump – producer & mixing (track 4)
- Andreas "Hush" Stasinopoulos – producer & mixing (track 5)
- L. "Crack Tracks" Parker – producer & mixing (track 6)
- Willie "K.I.D.D." Reed Jr. – producer & engineering (tracks: 7, 9, 12, 16)
- 1 Track Mind Productions – producer & mixing (tracks: 10, 13)
- Antonio "Tone-Tone" Henderson – producer & mixing (track 11)
- Ronna "Beat Doctor" Griffin – producer & mixing (track 14)
- Jamaal "Maal the Pimp" Hicks – engineering (tracks: 1, 3, 4, 8, 14, 15)
- Prevail – engineering (tracks: 4, 10, 11, 13)
- Conrad St. Julien – engineering (track 4)
- P.O.G. – engineering (tracks: 5, 8, 10, 13)
- Law – engineering (track 6)
- Lady Dolla – engineering (track 14)
- Carol A. Dorsey – executive producer

== Charts ==
| Chart (2007) | Peak position |
|---|---|
| US Billboard 200 | 21 |
| US Top R&B/Hip-Hop Albums (Billboard) | 4 |
| US Top Rap Albums (Billboard) | 1 |
| US Independent Albums (Billboard) | 1 |
