= Chopper City Boyz =

American hip-hop group

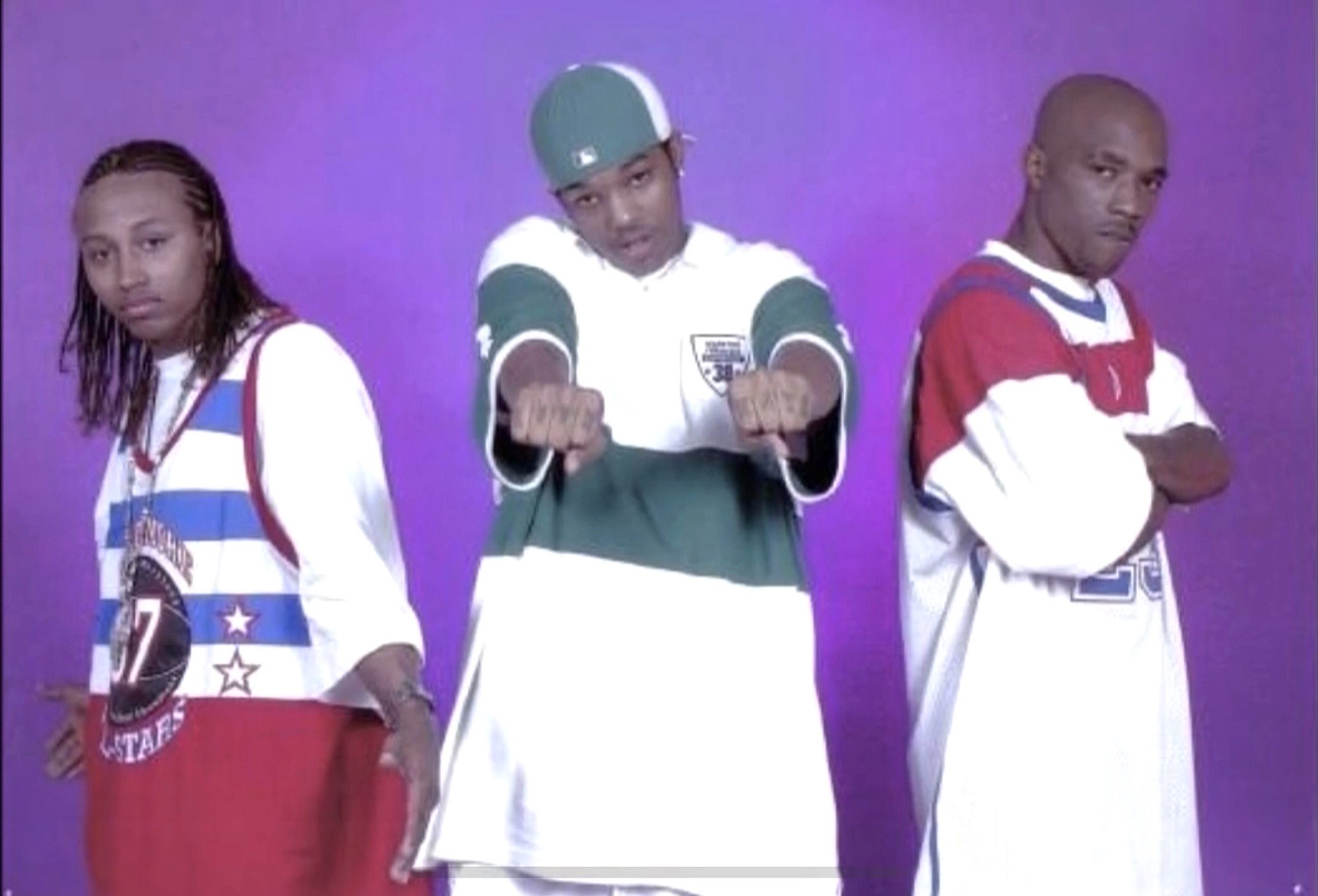

Background information
- Origin: New Orleans, Louisiana, U.S.
- Genres: Hip-hop
- Years active: 2003–2009
- Labels: Chopper City; Koch; Asylum
- Past members: Hakizzle; Gar; Snipe; VL Mike (deceased)

The Chopper City Boyz was a New Orleans–based rap group founded by rapper B.G. and signed to his Chopper City Records label. The group was formed in 2003 consisting of B.G.'s younger brother Hakizzle, Gar and Snipe, then VL Mike became an addition to the group in early 2004. The group had been featured on B.G.'s solo albums as well as several mixtapes between 2003 and 2006. The group released their debut album with B.G. titled We Got This in 2007, spawning the single "Make 'Em Mad", which was produced by David Banner. The group did exceptionally well for being on an independent record label, Koch Records, selling 36,000 in their first week on the chart.

VL Mike was fatally shot in New Orleans on April 20, 2008.

== Discography ==
=== Studio albums ===
Title	Album details	Peak chart positions	
Title	Album details	US	US R&B
We Got This (with B.G.)	Released: February 27, 2007; Label: Chopper City, Koch; Format: CD, digital download	21	4
Life in the Concrete Jungle (with B.G.)	Released: September 16, 2008; Label: Chopper City, Asylum; Format: CD, digital download	117	12
