= Syleena Johnson discography =

- Studio albums: 8
- Compilation albums: 1
- Singles: 29
- Music videos: 8

The discography of American R&B and soul singer and songwriter Syleena Johnson consists of eight studio albums, two collaborative albums, one greatest hits album, 29 singles, and eight music videos.

== Albums ==
=== Studio albums ===
Title	Album details	Peak chart positions	
Title	Album details	US	US R&B /HH
Chapter 1: Love, Pain & Forgiveness	Released: May 15, 2001; Label: Jive (#41700); Format: LP, Cassette, CD	101	16
Chapter 2: The Voice	Released: November 26, 2002; Label: Jive (#41815); Format: LP, Cassette, CD	104	19
Chapter 3: The Flesh	Released: September 13, 2005; Label: Jive; Format: CD, digital download	75	15
Chapter 4: Labor Pains	Released: January 13, 2009; Label: Aneelys, Federal, Fontana; Format: CD, digital download	—	42
Chapter 5: Underrated	Released: September 27, 2011; Label: Shanachie; Format: CD, digital download	—	49
Chapter 6: Couples Therapy	Released: October 27, 2014; Label: Blakbyrd; Format: CD, digital download	197	29
Rebirth of Soul	Released: November 10, 2017; Label: Shanachie; Format: CD, digital download	—	— (Note: Rebirth of Soul did not enter the Top R&B/Hip-Hop Albums chart, but peaked at number 35 on the R&B/Hip-Hop Album Sales chart.)
Woman	Released: January 31, 2020; Label: eOne Music; Format: CD, digital download	—	—
Legacy	Released: August 29, 2024; Label: SJ Entertainment; Format: Digital download, streaming	—	—

=== Demos ===
List of demos
Title	Demo details
Love Hangover	Released: January 26, 2000; Label: Twilight Records; Format: Cassette, CD

=== Collaborative albums ===
Title	Album details	Peak chart positions	
Title	Album details	US R&B /HH	US Reggae
This Time Together by Father and Daughter (with Syl Johnson)	Released: 1995; Label: Twinight Records; Format: CD	—	—
9ine (with Musiq Soulchild)	Released: September 24, 2013; Label: Shanachie; Format: CD, digital download	54	1

=== Compilation albums ===
Title	Album details
I Am Your Woman: The Best of Syleena Johnson	Released: July 22, 2008; Label: Jive; Format: CD, digital download

== Extended plays ==
Title	EP details	Peak chart positions
Title	EP details	US R&B /HH
Acoustic Soul Sessions	Released: September 25, 2012; Label: Shanachie; Format: CD, digital download	72

== Singles ==
=== As lead artist ===
Year	Title	Peak chart positions				Album
Year	Title	US R&B /HH	US Adult R&B	UK	UK R&B	Album
"It's On"	1998	—	—	—	—	Non-album single
"I Am Your Woman"	2002	43	4	—	—	Chapter 1: Love, Pain & Forgiveness
"Hit on Me"	2002	—	29	—	—	Chapter 1: Love, Pain & Forgiveness
"Baby I'm So Confused"	2002	—	—	—	—	Chapter 1: Love, Pain & Forgiveness
"Tonight I'm Gonna Let Go"	2002	53	—	38	8	Chapter 2: The Voice
"Guess What"	2002	29	1	—	—	Chapter 2: The Voice
"Guess What (Guess Again)" (Remix) (featuring R. Kelly)	2003	75	—	—	—	Chapter 2: The Voice
"Faithful to You"	2003	68	16	—	—	Chapter 2: The Voice
"Hypnotic" (featuring R. Kelly and Fabolous)	2005	81	—	—	—	Chapter 3: The Flesh
"Classic Love Song" (featuring Jermaine Dupri)	2005	—	—	—	—	Chapter 3: The Flesh
"Another Relationship"	2005	118	34	—	—	Chapter 3: The Flesh
"It Is True"	2008	—	—	—	—	Chapter 4: Labor Pains
"There'll Come a Time"	2011	—	—	—	—	Non-album single
"Peace Pipe"	2011	—	—	—	—	The Chicago "LP"
"A Boss"	2011	—	—	—	—	Chapter 5: Underrated
"Angry Girl" (featuring Tweet)	2011	—	—	126	—	Chapter 5: Underrated
"Like Thorns"	2012	—	—	—	—	Chapter 5: Underrated
"My Heart Is Open" (featuring Brenda Thompson)	2013	—	—	—	—	Non-album single
"Feel the Fire" (with Musiq Soulchild)	2013	—	—	—	—	9ine
"Perfectly Worthless"	2014	—	—	—	—	Chapter 6: Couples Therapy
"My Love"	2014	—	21	—	—	Chapter 6: Couples Therapy
"Harmony" (featuring Dave Hollister)	2015	—	—	—	—	Chapter 6: Couples Therapy
"We Did It"	2017	—	—	—	—	Rebirth of Soul
"Make Me Yours"	2017	—	—	—	—	Rebirth of Soul
"Woman"	2019	—	—	—	—	Woman
"Freelance Lover"	2019	—	—	—	—	Woman
"I Deserve More"	2020	—	—	—	—	Woman
"Never Been Better"	2021	—	—	—	—	The Making of a Woman (Deluxe Edition)
"Monsters In The Closet"	2023	—	—	—	—	Legacy
"Black Balloon" (featuring Syl Johnson)	2024	—	30	—	—	Legacy
"Different Strokes"	2024	—	—	—	—	Legacy

=== As featured artist ===
Title	Year	Peak chart positions								Album	Certifications
Title	Year	US	US R&B /HH	GER	IRE	NLD	NZ	UK	UK R&B	Album	Certifications
"All Falls Down" (Kanye West featuring Syleena Johnson)	2004	7	4	72	23	85	19	10	4	The College Dropout	RIAA: 2× Platinum; BPI: 3× Platinum; RMNZ: 4× Platinum
"Down and Out" (Cam'ron featuring Kanye West and Syleena Johnson)	2005	94	29	—	—	—	—	—	—	Purple Haze	

== Other charted songs ==
List of other charted songs, with selected chart positions, showing year released and album name
Title	Year	Peak chart position		Album
Title	Year	AUS	PRT	Album
"Donda Chant" (Kanye West featuring Syleena Johnson)	2021	57	112	Donda
"—" denotes a recording that did not chart or was not released in that territory.

== Videography ==
Title	Year	Director	Ref.
"It's On"	1999		
"I Am Your Woman"	2001		
"Hit on Me"	2001		
"Tonight I'm Gonna Let Go" (featuring Busta Rhymes)	2002		
"Guess What"	2002	Fab Five Freddy	
"All Falls Down" (Kanye West featuring Syleena Johnson)	2004	Chris Milk	
"Hypnotic" (featuring R. Kelly & Fabolous)	2005	Jessy Terrero	
"A Boss"	2011	G Visuals	
