= Guess What (song) =

2002 single by Syleena Johnson

Single by Syleena Johnson

from the album Chapter 2: The Voice
- Released: August 20, 2002
- Recorded: 2001; Rock Land Studios; Chicago Recording Company (Chicago, Illinois)
- Length: 3:32
- Label: Jive
- Songwriter(s): Robert Kelly
- Producer(s): R. Kelly

Syleena Johnson singles chronology
"Tonight I'm Gonna Let Go" (2002)	"Guess What" (2002)	"Faithful to You" (2003)

"Guess What" is a song by American recording artist Syleena Johnson from her second studio album, Chapter 2: The Voice. Written and produced by R. Kelly, the song was released as the album's second single on August 20, 2002. It became Johnson's first number-one single as a lead artist in the US, peaking at number one on the Adult R&B Songs chart and staying there for four non-consecutive weeks.

An accompanying music video was directed by Fab Five Freddy. The video depicts Johnson's conflict with her unfaithful lover. A remix entitled "Guess What (Guess Again)" was released as a single and featured R. Kelly's vocals as well as production and writing.

== Composition and production ==
R. Kelly wrote "Guess What" around the theme of infidelity. Like other R. Kelly-written songs, the song had a similar pattern of people complaining and expressing their unhappiness in relationships, with a threat of leaving the romance. The song was believed to have been written about Johnson's relationship with her then husband Marcus Betts. "God. Now, "Guess What", unfortunately, I think that was written about Marcus", Johnson explained to Jamie Foster Brown, the publisher of Sister 2 Sister magazine. "I ain't write it, though. I think because of the conversation I had with Robert [R. Kelly], he wrote it because of that."

"Guess What" is a funk-soul and R&B song, which is layered over a gospel beat that runs for three minutes and thirty-two seconds. According to Chuck Arnold for People, "Guess What" is a "gospel-tinged ballad". "Guess What" is written in the key of D-flat major and is set in common time with a moderate dance groove with 82 beats per minute (BPM).

== Music video ==
The video opens with Syleena's phone ringing. She then picks up her cell phone and talks to her love interest (played by Ro Brooks, who also played as her love interest in her "I Am Your Woman" music video). While they are talking, Syleena tells him that she knows that he went out with a girl named Tonya the other night. She later hangs up the phone and walks away and sits on a couch right next to a fish tank. The song begins playing. Syleena sings while standing on the balcony of the staircase. Her lover then walks in, takes off his jacket and hangs it on the coat rack. He walks up to her and attempts to confront her but she then pauses him and they begin arguing. He then walks away to another room and closes the door. He is playing a video game on the couch as Syleena sits right next to him trying to talk to him. He then pulls out a magazine and reads it to ignore her. Eventually he walks away, grabs his jacket from the coat rack and opens the door, walking out. As he is walking out, he approaches Syleena's three friends as they both walk in, looking confused. They sit on the couch with her and start talking. Later, her love interest pulls up to their house. Syleena walks up to the door and opens it Her love interest walks up to the house only to see trash bags with his stuff in it in front of it and later leaves. Syleena opens the door for another man, smiles and hugs him. He later walks in and Syleena smirks as the video cuts to black.

== Release and chart performance ==
"Guess What" was first released in the United States, where a promo-only 12-inch single was issued to radio airplay in May 2002. Officially released to retailers by August and radio in October 2002, the song debuted on the US Hot R&B/Hip-Hop Airplay chart. It spent 28 weeks on the chart, peaking at number twenty-nine. It initially entered the Bubbling Under Hot 100 at number nineteen on the chart, where it moved up to number four a few weeks later. "Guess What" fared better on some of Billboard's other charts, including number twenty-nine on the Hot R&B/Hip-Hop Songs chart and number one for four non-consecutive weeks on the Adult R&B Songs chart.

== Other usages ==
The song was featured on Totally R&B, a 2003 album from the Totally Hits compilation album series that features popular R&B songs from various artists. "Guess What" was also included on Johnson's greatest hits album The Best of Syleena Johnson (2008).

== Charts ==
=== Weekly charts ===
Chart (2002–03)	Peak position
US Bubbling Under Hot 100 Singles (Billboard)	4
US Hot R&B/Hip-Hop Songs (Billboard)	29

=== Year-end charts ===
Chart (2003)	Position
US Hot R&B/Hip-Hop Songs (Billboard)	80
