= How to Go Mad Without Losing Your Mind =

2021 book by La Marr Jurelle Bruce

- Author: La Marr Jurelle Bruce
- Publisher: Duke University Press
- Publication date: June 2021
- ISBN: 978-1-4780-1087-6

How to Go Mad Without Losing Your Mind: Madness and Black Creativity is a 2021 book by La Marr Jurelle Bruce. It addresses the intersections of madness and black creativity from a contemporary perspective, exploring the nuance in practice by several acclaimed and enigmatic artists, especially in jazz, hip hop, and theatre.

== Synopsis ==
The book begins with describing madness as a state of mind and of body, and strives to elucidate a spatial dimension of historical complexity in order to explore the inconspicuous side of creativity. The succeeding chapters highlight the artistic contributions of artists like Buddy Bolden (the fabled founder of jazz), Lauryn Hill, Dave Chappelle, and Eddie Murphy. Bruce provides a holistic and critical analysis of media sponsored claims of lunacy in regards to each artist, and articulates varied metaphorical ideas for more concrete expression. The book reveals madness as a species of suffering, through the context of the psychological plight of African Americans during the Plantocracy era. It attempts to prove that the subsequent political climate of the American postcolonial nation-state procured such emotional turbulence as to foster the cognitive realms that pioneered the contemporary creative industry.

He describes madness as phenomenal, medicalized, psychosocial, and enveloped within the emotion of rage. The book focuses on African American temporality as a specific realm of American consciousness and highlights mad creativity within media culture. He presents a psychological framework to navigate the existence of 'mad time', 'melancholic time' and 'jubilant time' within the American subaltern reality.

== Author ==
La Marr Jurelle Bruce is an interdisciplinary humanities scholar from the Bronx, New York. He received his B.A. in African American Studies and English and Comparative Literature from Columbia University and his Ph.D. in African American Studies and American Studies from Yale University in 2013. He is an associate professor of American Studies at the University of Maryland, College Park.

Bruce is most known for his idea of interlapping definitions of madness and is considered a key contributor to Mad Studies and "mad methodology", which "recognizes mad persons as critical theorists and decisive protagonists in struggles for liberation".

== Development and publication ==
The author first gained recognition for his essay entitled "The People Inside My Head, Too’: Madness, Black Womanhood, and the Radical Performance of Lauryn Hill", for which the African American Review awarded Bruce with the Joe Weixlmann Award for Best Essay Representing Twentieth- and Twenty-First-Century African-American or Pan-African Literature and Culture. This essay provides a critical discourse on Lauryn Hill's live album, MTV Unplugged No. 2.0 and the renowned record, I Gotta Find Peace of Mind. The essay articulates an initial interest in perceived madness and the media. The research present in the essay takes up a substantial portion of How to Go Mad Without Losing Your Mind: Madness and Black Radical Creativity.

== Reception ==
How To Go Mad Without Losing Your Mind won the 2022 Modern Language Association Prize for a First Book and the Nicolás Cristóbal Guillén Batista Outstanding Book Award from the Caribbean Philosophical Association.
