= I Am Your Woman =

2001 single by Syleena Johnson

Single by Syleena Johnson

from the album Chapter 1: Love, Pain & Forgiveness
- Released: February 12, 2001
- Recorded: 2000; Battery Studios (New York City)
- Length: 4:27
- Label: Jive
- Songwriter: Robert Kelly
- Producers: Syleena Johnson; R. Kelly

Syleena Johnson singles chronology
"I Am Your Woman" (2001)	"Hit on Me" (2001)

"I Am Your Woman" is the debut single by American singer Syleena Johnson. Written and produced by R. Kelly, it was released on February 12, 2001 as the lead single from her debut album, Chapter 1: Love, Pain & Forgiveness (2001). The song received a positive reception from music critics.

The song was released as the first single from her debut album. In the United States, it also received airplay on adult contemporary and urban radios, resulting in a number 38 charting on Billboard's Hot R&B/Hip-Hop Airplay chart. An accompanying music video for the track was directed by Jessy Terrero.

On January 31, 2019, Johnson announced that she will no longer be performing the song after the airing of a television documentary, Surviving R. Kelly, exposed new allegations of sexual misconduct and assault by Kelly, who had previously been charged regarding similar accusations in 2002 but was acquitted in 2008.

== Background and writing ==
In 1997, Johnson went to a party hosted by singer R. Kelly after a charity basketball game, where she saw a man whose badge indicated he was with Kelly's entourage. She told him she was a singer and songwriter and managed to convince him to give her the phone number of Jive Records' executive Wayne Williams. Williams listened to the tracks Johnson sent him, which were taken from her earlier self-produced album. Three days later, he offered Johnson a contract, and in 1998 Johnson joined the Jive label. Johnson was pleased to sign with them, because they signed her as a singer and songwriter and gave her a great deal of artistic freedom.

For the writing of her debut album Chapter 1: Love, Pain & Forgiveness, Johnson envisioned "a very personal narrative" and wanted the songs to be inspired by a painful breakup of a romantic relationship. Wayne Williams brought R. Kelly in to write a "radio-friendly" song. After listening to Johnson's album, Kelly agreed to further work on it and chose to write a song that he felt would fit in the entire album. During recording sessions, Kelly presented the written lyrics of "I Am Your Woman" to Johnson. Johnson told a Girlposse reviewer that she wanted listeners to hear the album and say, "Man! that's a great story." She also commented, "I want people to be emotional and to be touched and to get positive input from what I write. All I can say is I am very proud of this album."

== Critical reception ==
"I Am Your Woman" has been lauded by contemporary music critics. Jon Azpiri of AllMusic called the song "infectious " and complimented Johnson's vocals and said that it was suited for both blues and soul." Michel Paoletta, editor for Billboard magazine, declared "I Am Your Woman" an "anthem single [...] which features very confrontational lyrics along with a jazzy beat." Impressed about the song, NME editor Diana Evans wrote that the song is "preceded by a mesmeric, orchestral intro that seems to lift like a veil onto the LP's troubled, graceful landscape."

== Music video ==
The music video for "I Am Your Woman", directed by Jessy Terrero, was filmed in a neighborhood located in Chicago, Illinois, on February 18, 2001. American actor Ro Brooks plays as Johnson's love interest in the video. In 2001, "I Am Your Woman" earned Johnson her first Billboard Music Video Award nomination for Best New Artist Clip of the Year in the Adult Contemporary category at the 2001 awards ceremony. The music video was one of BET's most-played clips for the weeks of March 25, May 6, May 13 and June 10, 2001.

=== Synopsis ===
The video starts out by showing three houses in the center of a neighborhood. The camera then turns and rolls to a house and enters inside of it where it shows Johnson sitting on a dining table with her love interest (Ro Brooks) and is arguing with him. He then gets up and walks out of the house, gets in his car and leaves. Johnson is later seen walking into the kitchen and putting food in the refrigerator. As she closes the refrigerator, she notices a photo of her and her love interest and admires it. She then starts cleaning the dishes. Johnson then walks upstairs to her room and lays down on her bed. She also sits on a staircase while singing. It later begins raining outside and Johnson walks outside and sits on a swing in her front porch. She then gets up and starts standing on the porch. She eventually walks back into the house and turns off all of the lights. She goes back upstairs to her room and starts sleeping. Her love interest later comes back to the house and walks upstairs to the room. He walks up to Johnson as she is sleeping and kisses her on her head. She then awakes and smiles.

== Live performances ==
Johnson appeared as the musical guest and performed the song on Tom Joyner Morning Show on the American basic cable network channel TV One. Johnson performed "I Am Your Woman" at Indiana Black Expo on March 17, 2001. She performed the song during her Chapter 6: Couples Therapy album release event at the SOB's in New York City on November 3, 2014.

== Formats and track listings ==
- United States
1. "I Am Your Woman" (Album Version) – 4:27
2. "I Am Your Woman" (Soul Society Remix) – 4:08
3. "Ain't No Love'" – 4:48
4. "You Got Me Spinnin'" – 4:27
- United Kingdom CD single
1. "I Am Your Woman" (Album Version) – 4:27
2. "I Am Your Woman" (Soul Society Remix) – 4:08
3. "I Am Your Woman" (Summertime Club Mix) – 8:55
4. "I Am Your Woman" (Video)
- United Kingdom Cassette single
1. "I Am Your Woman" (Radio Edit) – 4:12
2. "I Am Your Woman" (Soul Society Radio Mix) – 4:11
- Canada
1. "I Am Your Woman" (Album Version) – 4:27
2. "I Am Your Woman" (Super Soul Sista Funk Mix) – 8:18
- Europe
1. "I Am Your Woman" (Album Version) – 4:27
2. "I Am Your Woman" (Soul Society Remix) – 4:11
3. "I Am Your Woman" (Summertime Main Club Mix) – 8:55
4. "I Am Your Woman" (Summertime Radio Mix) – 4:30
- Australia
1. "I Am Your Woman" (Radio Edit) – 4:12
2. "I Am Your Woman" (Summertime Radio Edit) – 4:30
3. "I Am Your Woman" (Respectable Ol Skool Dub) – 4:02
4. "I Am Your Woman" (Summertime Main Club Mix) – 8:55
5. "I Am Your Woman" (Super Soul Sista Instrumental) (Mary Kay Mix) – 8:18
6. "Ain't No Love" – 4:48

== Credits and personnel ==
Credits adapted from the Chapter 1: Love, Pain & Forgiveness liner notes.

- Songwriting – R. Kelly
- Recording – Ian Mereness, Abel Garibaldi
- Mixing – Peter Mokran, R. Kelly

== Charts ==
Chart (2001)	Peak position
US Adult R&B Songs (Billboard)	4
US Hot R&B/Hip-Hop Songs (Billboard)	43
