= Put Your Hands Where My Eyes Could See =

1997 single by Busta Rhymes

Single by Busta Rhymes

from the album When Disaster Strikes...
- Released: August 12, 1997
- Recorded: 1997
- Studio: Soundtrack Studios, New York City
- Genre: Hip hop
- Length: 3:20
- Label: Flipmode; Elektra
- Songwriters: Smith; Darrol Durant; Roger Munroe
- Producers: Shamello; Buddah; Epitome (co.)

Busta Rhymes singles chronology
"Do My Thing" (1997)	"Put Your Hands Where My Eyes Could See" (1997)	"Dangerous" (1997)

Music video
- "Put Your Hands Where My Eyes Could See" on YouTube

"Put Your Hands Where My Eyes Could See" is a song by American rapper Busta Rhymes. It was released as the lead single from his second studio album When Disaster Strikes... on August 12, 1997, by Flipmode Entertainment and Elektra Records. The song was written by Rhymes and its main producers Shamello and Buddah. The song was co-produced by Epitome and contains additional vocals by Fabulouz Fabz, who was Rhymes' road manager at the time.

Its music video is notable for its homage to the 1988 Eddie Murphy film Coming to America. The song contains a sample of the 1976 recording "Sweet Green Fields" by American soft rock duo Seals and Crofts. Rhymes scored a second consecutive nomination for Best Rap Solo Performance at the 40th Grammy Awards.

== Background ==
"Put Your Hands Where My Eyes Could See" is the first song producer Buddah has ever produced. Fellow producer Shamello found American soft rock duo Seals and Crofts' 1976 recording "Sweet Green Fields", and the two came up with the instrumental of the song. After Fabulouz Fabz who was Rhymes' road manager at the time heard the beat, he showed it to Rhymes.

In a studio session with Puff Daddy, Q-Tip and Fat Joe and his crew, Rhymes played the beat for them and Puff Daddy and Q-Tip told him, "Yo, you need to stop screaming on records all the time. Bitches don't wanna do that shit all the time. [...] Just make a record just being cool, just use your regular voice." After finishing the song, Rhymes played it for them, "they was [...] losing they mind in a crazy way. [...] It was the most incredible reinvention to them and the fact that it was they idea..." After only hearing positive feedback, Rhymes stuck to his more calm delivery. He has stated that the song "was the last thing [he] expected to make."

== Composition and lyrics ==
"Put Your Hands Where My Eyes Could See" was composed in 4/4 time and the key of C♯ minor, with a tempo of 99 beats per minute. It has a duration time of three minutes and twenty seconds.

The song and most notably the intro have Busta Rhymes and his road manager at the time Fabulouz Fabz ad-libbing in a similar way to Puff Daddy, who along with Q-Tip was the inspiration for Rhymes to rely on the texture of his voice rather than the energy his delivery was known for. In the first verse, Rhymes ends each line with a "yo" sound. He has stated that he did so because, "when we used to go out of town, the West Indian dudes to blend in and make themselves seem like they was American, these niggas would just add the word 'yo.'"

== Chart performance ==
Despite huge airplay, the song only peaked within the top forty on the US Billboard Hot 100 Airplay chart, where it peaked at number thirty-seven. It was most successful on its component Hot R&B/Hip-Hop Songs chart, where it reached number two. It also charted outside the US, reaching the top 20 on the UK Singles Chart at number 16.

== Reception and legacy ==
In 1999, MTV ranked the video itself at #20 for The 100 Greatest Music Videos Ever Made and VH1 ranked the song at #7 on their list of the 40 Greatest Hip Hop Songs of the 90s. In 2021, Cleveland.com ranked the song as number 110 of the best 200 rap songs, calling it "one of the great miracles of Nineties hip hop."

In March 2023, a remix of Coi Leray's hit song "Players" using the instrumental of "Put Your Hands Where My Eyes Could See" and containing a guest verse by Busta Rhymes was released.

== Music video ==
The official music video for the song, directed by Hype Williams and designed by Ron Norsworthy, is based on Eddie Murphy's 1988 film Coming to America. According to Busta Rhymes, the inspiration for this idea was that Coming to America was playing on the television in the studio at the time he and the production crew were working on mixing the record. The film is about an African living in New York City and Busta Rhymes felt that the record had an African sound to it. At the chorus is a well choreographed dance routine which is followed by Busta running from an elephant and him, along with The Flipmode Squad, in glowing tribal African makeup and outfit. The video debuted in mid-August 1997 on MTV. with Pauly Shore interviewing Rhymes live. The video received heavy rotation on both the MTV and BET networks. The video was filmed at Chambers and Centre Street in Downtown Manhattan — including the main lobby of the Surrogate's Courthouse.

== Awards and nominations ==
"Put Your Hands Where My Eyes Could See" earned Rhymes his second nomination for Best Rap Solo Performance at the 40th Grammy Awards. The award went to "Men in Black" by Will Smith. The music video earned four nominations including Best Male Video and Best Rap Video at the 1998 MTV VMAs. It lost both to Will Smith, respectively, for "Just the Two of Us" and "Gettin' Jiggy wit It".

== Samples ==
- In 2002, American singer-songwriter Syleena Johnson sampled the song for her single "Tonight I'm Gonna Let Go", which was released as part of her second studio album, Chapter 2: The Voice (2002). The official remix (which also samples this song) features Rhymes himself, along with Rhymes's fellow Flipmode Squad members Rampage, Sham (also known as Baby Sham), and Spliff Star.
- In 2023, a remix to rapper Coi Leray's 2022 song "Players" (from her second studio album Coi (2023)) sampled this song. Rhymes himself contributed a guest verse to the remix version.
- In 2026, 2Rare released a song called "Bussed Down" which co samples Amerie's 2006 hit "1Thing".

== In other media ==
This song was also featured on video games True Crime: New York City, Def Jam Rapstar, DJ Hero 2, NBA 2K18, WWE 2K24, and Madden NFL 25.

== Charts ==
=== Weekly charts ===
Chart (1997)	Peak position
Scottish Singles Sales (Official Charts)	45
UK Singles (Official Charts)	16
UK Dance (Official Charts)	2
US R&B/Hip-Hop Airplay (Billboard)	2
US Radio Songs (Billboard)	37
US Rhythmic Airplay (Billboard)	16

=== Year-end charts ===
Chart (1997)	Position
UK Urban (Music Week)	15
