= Chapter Four =

Chapter Four refers to a fourth chapter in a book.

Chapter Four, Chapter 4, or Chapter IV may also refer to:

== Music ==
- Chapter 4, a band on J Records
- Chapter 4 (EP), an EP by Zion I
- Chapter Four: Alive in New York, an album by Gato Barbieri
- Chapter 4: Labor Pains, an album by Syleena Johnson
- "Chapter Four" (song), by Avenged Sevenfold from Waking the Fallen
- Chapter 4 (g.o.d album), 2001

== Television ==
- "Chapter 4" (American Horror Story)
- "Chapter 4" (Eastbound & Down)
- "Chapter 4" (House of Cards)
- "Chapter 4" (Legion)
- "Chapter 4" (Star Wars: Clone Wars), an episode of Star Wars: Clone Wars
- "Chapter 4" (Uncoupled)
- "Chapter 4: Family Secrets", an episode of A Murder at the End of the World
- "Chapter 4: Sanctuary", an episode of The Mandalorian
- "Chapter 4: The Gathering Storm", an episode of The Book of Boba Fett
- "Chapter Four" (Boston Public)
- "Chapter Four: Commit... to YOU", an episode of Barry
- "Chapter Four: Housechilling Party", an episode of Special
- "Chapter Four: The Last Picture Show", an episode of Riverdale
- "Chapter Four: Here Comes the Sun", an episode of Katy Keene
- "Chapter Four: Witch Academy", an episode of Chilling Adventures of Sabrina
- Episodes of Stranger Things:
  - "Chapter Four: The Body", season 1
  - "Chapter Four: Will the Wise", season 2
  - "Chapter Four: The Sauna Test", season 3
  - "Chapter Four: Dear Billy", season 4
  - "Chapter Four: Sorcerer", season 5

== Law ==
- Chapter IV of the Constitution of Australia
- Chapter IV of the United Nations Charter
