= Donda Chant =

Song by Kanye West

from the album Donda
- Released: August 29, 2021
- Recorded: July 15, 2021
- Genre: Spoken word
- Length: 0:52
- Label: GOOD; Def Jam
- Songwriters: Kanye West; Syleena Johnson; Malik Yusef
- Producer: Kanye West

"Donda Chant" is the opening track of American rapper Kanye West's tenth studio album, Donda (2021). A spoken word song, it solely features vocals from American singer-songwriter Syleena Johnson, and was written by West and Johnson alongside Malik Yusef. Johnson flew out to San Francisco to record for the album in July 2021, and recorded the song the same day. Upon the release of Donda, it received overwhelmingly negative reviews from music critics.

Despite not being released as a single, the song charted on the ARIA Charts in Australia, peaking at number 57. The song also made charts in Portugal and South Africa, peaking at number 112 and number 30 respectively. A music video for the song was released via Instagram by West on September 18, 2021. Throughout the video, pictures of both Kanye and his mother Donda West are projected atop a replica of the former's childhood home.

== Background and composition ==
Kanye West first collaborated with Syleena Johnson in 2004 on his single "All Falls Down", where she contributed vocals on the chorus, interpolating lyrics from Lauryn Hill's "Mystery of Iniquity". West continued to work with Johnson during the early years of his career, including producing her 2005 track "Bull's-Eye (Suddenly)". On July 15, 2021, Johnson flew out to San Francisco to record for Donda. Johnson talked more about the collaboration on Cocktails with Queens on Fox Soul on August 31, saying that West told her that he "wanted the album to have some type of healing component", after which Johnson suggested that the consonant sounds in "Donda" sound like a "meditative chant". The singer then laid down vocals repeating "Donda" in different cadences and rhythms after telling West about the idea. She said that she had no idea that West would use the track in the way that he did on the album. Johnson said during the same session that she recorded vocals for another song, which was ultimately not included on the album.

Musically, "Donda Chant" is a spoken word song. Johnson repeatedly chants "Donda" for the song's full length of 52 seconds without pausing as a mantra, replicating the sound of a fading heartbeat. She utters the word 60 times, accompanied by no instrumental.

== Reception ==
"Donda Chant" received generally negative reviews from music critics, who overwhelmingly found it to be repetitive and a poor intro track. Chuck Arnold of the New York Post ranked it as one of the worst songs of 2021, saying that "Even if Ye's heart was in the right place, this song probably had Mom rolling over in her grave". Similarly, Pitchfork ranked Johnson's feature as one of the worst on the album, with writer Alphonse Pierre "choosing to pretend that the chanting Donda intro does not exist and think of Syleena Johnson’s 'All Falls Down' hook instead." GQ's Stephen Kearse saw the song–and by extension the rest of the album–as "relentless[ly]" empty, criticizing how its repetition "hammer[s]" Donda's name "into a bland litany". Alternatively, Junkee praised how its repetitive nature turns Donda's voice into a prayer, believing that the whole album can be explained through it: "It's meaning through repetition. It's the intimate broken down into its most accessible, most discrete moments. And it's a man crafting a testament to the hole in his heart; to the pain that refuses to leave him."

Commercially, the song charted at number 57 on the ARIA Charts in Australia. It also charted at number 112 on the Associação Fonográfica Portuguesa chart in Portugal and peaked at number 30 on The Official South African Charts, the latter being the track's highest position on any chart.

== Music video ==
On September 18, 2021, West shared an accompanying music video exclusively to his Instagram. The video was directed by British fashion photographer Nick Knight, who also shot the visual for album track "24". It is set in black and white, and has a length of 61 seconds. Aerial footage is displayed of the replica of West's replica childhood home from the album's third listening party at Soldier Field in Chicago on August 26, 2021, which two rows of moving cars circle around. Flashes of photographs are projected onto the replica house that show Donda, who is pictured as both a child and an adult, while some images feature Kanye West accompanying her. Pictures of West as a baby and video footage of his mother, including clips where she laughs, are also displayed.

== Personnel ==
Credits adapted from Tidal.

- Vocals - Syleena Johnson
- Mixing engineering - Irko
- Record engineering - Alejandro Rodriguez-Dawsøn, Will Chason

== Charts ==
Chart performance for "Donda Chant"
Chart (2021)	Peak position
Australia (ARIA)	57
Portugal (AFP)	112
South Africa (TOSAC)	30
