= Chapter 2: The Voice =

Studio album by Syleena Johnson
- Released: November 26, 2002
- Recorded: 2002
- Genre: R&B; soul; neo soul
- Length: 63:09
- Label: Jive
- Producer: Dwayne Bastiany; Carvin & Ivan; Mike Dunn; Hi-Tek; R. Kelly; Joel Kipnis; C. Major; Scorpio

Syleena Johnson chronology
Chapter 1: Love, Pain & Forgiveness (2001)	Chapter 2: The Voice (2002)	Chapter 3: The Flesh (2005)

Singles from Chapter 2: The Voice
- 1. "Tonight I'm Gonna Let Go" Released: August 5, 2002; 2. "Guess What" Released: October 28, 2002

Chapter 2: The Voice is the second studio album by American singer Syleena Johnson. It was released by Jive Records on November 26, 2002 in the United States. While Johnson reteamed with R. Kelly and Joel Kipnis to work on the album, Chapter 2 includes a diverse roster of collaborators including Hi-Tek, Dwayne Bastiany, Mike Dunn and Scorpio as well as duo Carvin & Ivan who contributed four songs. Upon its release, it debuted and peaked at number 104 on the US Billboard 200 and entered the top 20 on the Top R&B/Hip-Hop Albums chart. With "Tonight I'm Gonna Let Go", the album's lead single, Chapter 2 produced Johnson's first international top forty hit.

== Release and promotion ==
The album's lead single "Tonight I'm Gonna Let Go" was released on August 5, 2002. The song, that samples on Busta Rhymes' Put Your Hands Where My Eyes Could See, was one of BET's most-played clips for the weeks of October 13, October 20 and October 27, 2002. The Voice's second single "Guess What" was written and produced by R. Kelly; it was sent to radios on October 28.

Professional ratings
Review scores
Source	Rating
AllMusic	4/5 stars
Blender	2/5 stars
Vibe	3.5/5 stars

== Track listing ==
No.	Title	Writer(s)	Producer(s)	Length
1.	"The Voice"/"Intro"	Syleena Johnson; Tony Cottrell; Lawrence Howard Brown; Oleg Lopatin; Marvin Gaye; Al Cleveland; Renaldo Benson	Hi-Tek	4:33
2.	"Faithful to You"	Johnson; Dwayne Bastiany	Bastiany	3:30
3.	"Now That I Got You"	Johnson; Bastiany; Deniece Williams; Susaye Greene; Henry Redd; Nathan Watts	Bastiany	3:37
4.	"Dear You"	Johnson; Carvin Haggins; Ivan Barias; Jamar Jones	Carvin & Ivan	2:53
5.	"Guess What"	R. Kelly	R. Kelly	3:32
6.	"I'm Gon' Cry"	Johnson; Haggins; Barias; Frank Romano; Steve Cropper; Al Jackson, Jr.; Donald Dunn; Booker T. Jones	Carvin & Ivan	3:31
7.	"Is That You"	Johnson; Mike Dunn	Dunn	4:30
8.	"Tonight I'm Gonna Let Go"	Johnson; Dunn; James Seals	Dunn	3:54
9.	"If You Play Your Cards Right"	Kevin McCord	Scorpio	6:01
10.	"No Words"	Johnson; Haggins; Barias; Romano	Carvin & Ivan	3:46
11.	"So Willingly"	Johnson; Haggins; Barias; Romano	Carvin & Ivan	3:46
12.	"Guitars of the Heart (Happy)"	Johnson; Joel Kipnis	JK	5:40
13.	"I Believe in Love"	Johnson; Christian Robinson	C. Major; Scorpio	3:51
14.	"Outro"	Johnson; Cottrell	Hi-Tek	0:59
15.	"Tonight I'm Gonna Let Go (Remix)" (featuring Busta Rhymes, Rampage, Sham & Spliff Star of Flipmode Squad)	Johnson; Dunn; Seals; Trevor Smith; Roger McNair; Leroy Jones; William Lewis	Dunn; Scorpio; R. Kelly	4:18
16.	"Joined at the Hip"	R. Kelly	R. Kelly	3:55

Sampling credits

- "Tonight I'm Gonna Let Go" contains re-played elements from "Sweet Green Fields" by Seals and Crofts.
- "If You Play Your Cards Right" is a cover of the 1981 song by Alicia Myers.
- "Tonight I'm Gonna Let Go (Remix)" samples on "Put Your Hands Where My Eyes Could See" by Busta Rhymes.

== Personnel ==
Credits adapted from the album's liner notes.

- Kamel Abdo – Engineer
- Timmy Allen – Vocals (background)
- Ivan "Orthodox" Barias – Producer, Instrumentation
- Dwayne Bastiany – Producer, Instrumentation
- Jim Bottari – Engineer
- Kara Buhl – Photo Production
- C-Major – Producer
- Troy Corbin – Vocals (background)
- Mike Dunn – Producer, Engineer
- Rodney East – Keyboards
- David Flemming – Engineer
- Andy Gallas – Engineer
- Abel Garibaldi – Programming, Engineer
- Serban Ghenea – Mixing
- Tony Gillis – Mastering
- Tarsha Gray – Hair Stylist
- Carvin "Ransum" Haggins – Producer, Vocal Arrangement
- Hi-Tek – Producer
- Syleena Johnson – Arranger, Vocals (background), Vocal Arrangement
- Jamar Jones – Keyboards
- R. Kelly – Arranger, Vocals (background), Producer, Mixing, Remix Producer, Remix Arrangement
- Donnie Lyle – Bass, Guitar
- Carlos "Storm" Martinez – Engineer
- Charles McCrorey – Engineer
- Ian Mereness – Programming, Engineer, Mixing
- Jason Mlodzinski – Assistant
- Jackie Murphy – Art Direction, Design
- Herb Powers – Mastering
- Darien Rapp – Engineer
- Christian Robinson – Engineer
- Frank Romano – Guitar
- Patrick Salisbury – Photography
- Brian Stanley – Engineer
- Rich Tapper – Engineer
- Chris Trevett – Engineer
- Denise Trorman – Art Direction, Design
- Pamela Watson – Stylist
- Doug Wilson – Engineer

== Charts ==
=== Weekly charts ===
Chart (2002)	Peak position
UK Independent Albums (OCC)	34
UK R&B Albums (OCC)	34
US Billboard 200	104
US Top R&B/Hip-Hop Albums (Billboard)	19
US Heatseekers Albums (Billboard)	1

=== Year-end charts ===
Chart (2003)	Position
US Top R&B/Hip-Hop Albums (Billboard)	59

== Release history ==
Region	Date	Label	Ref.
United States	November 26, 2002	Jive; Sony Legacy	
