= Down and Out (Cam'ron song) =

Single by Cam'ron featuring Kanye West and Syleena Johnson

from the album Purple Haze
- Released: January 11, 2005
- Genre: Hip hop, chipmunk soul
- Length: 4:08
- Label: Roc-A-Fella, Diplomat, Def Jam
- Songwriters: Cameron Giles; Fred Briggs; Brian Miller; Kanye West
- Producers: Kanye West; Brian "All Day" Miller

Cam'ron singles chronology
"Girls" (2004)	"Down and Out" (2005)	"Do Ya Thing" (2006)

Kanye West singles chronology
"I Changed My Mind" (2004)	"Down and Out" (2005)	"The Corner" (2005)

Syleena Johnson singles chronology
"All Falls Down" (2004)	"Down and Out" (2005)	"Hypnotic" (2005)

"Down and Out" is a song by American rapper Cam'ron, released as the fifth and final single from his fourth studio album Purple Haze (2004). It features guest appearances from singer Syleena Johnson and rapper Kanye West. Though West received the sole producer credit for the track, he acknowledged that the beat was primarily produced by Brian "All Day" Miller.

== Music video ==
The music video for Down and Out was directed by Life Garland and follows the split-video format that was popular in hip-hop during the 2000s. The first portion of the video features the first two verses of Down and Out, while the second half transitions into the first verse and chorus of Get 'Em Daddy. Jim Jones, 40 Cal., Juelz Santana, and Damon Dash all make cameo appearances in the video.

== Charts ==
Chart (2005)	Peak position
US Billboard Hot 100	94
US R&B/Hip-Hop Songs (Billboard)	29
US Rap Songs (Billboard)	20

== Radio and release history ==
Country	Date	Format	Label
United States	January 11, 2005	Rhythmic contemporary radio	Roc-A-Fella, Diplomat, Def Jam
United States	January 18, 2005	Urban contemporary radio	Roc-A-Fella, Diplomat, Def Jam
United States	January 25, 2005	Vinyl single	Roc-A-Fella, Diplomat, Def Jam
