= All Falls Down =

Single by Kanye West featuring Syleena Johnson

from the album The College Dropout
- B-side: "Get 'Em High"
- Released: March 8, 2004
- Recorded: 2002–04
- Studio: Sony Music Studios, New York City, New York; Larrabee Sound North, Los Angeles, California
- Genre: Hip-hop; conscious hip-hop
- Length: 3:43
- Label: Roc-A-Fella; Def Jam
- Songwriters: Kanye West; Lauryn Hill
- Producer: Kanye West

Kanye West singles chronology
"Slow Jamz" (2003)	"All Falls Down" (2004)	"Selfish" (2004)

Syleena Johnson singles chronology
"Tonight I'm Gonna Let Go" (2002)	"All Falls Down" (2004)	"Hypnotic" (2005)

Music video
- "All Falls Down" on YouTube

"All Falls Down" is a song by American rapper Kanye West. It was released as the third single from his debut studio album, The College Dropout (2004). The song was written and produced by West and features American R&B and soul singer Syleena Johnson. The song is a hip-hop and conscious hip-hop track, and contains an interpolation of "Mystery of Iniquity" by Lauryn Hill from her live album MTV Unplugged No. 2.0; Hill is credited as a composer. The song was recorded in Sony Music Studios in New York City, New York and Larrabee Sound North in Los Angeles, California.

Released on the 8th of March, 2004, almost a month after the release of The College Dropout, the "All Falls Down" single (backed with fellow album track "Get 'Em High") entered the UK Singles Chart at number ten and peaked at number seven on the US Billboard Hot 100 on the 11th of May, his first solo Top 10 hit in the US. The song would also chart in the top 10 on six other charts, the song's highest position being a peak at number 2 on the US Hot Rap Tracks chart, just behind "Tipsy" by fellow American rapper J-Kwon.

The song was nominated for Best Rap/Sung Collaboration at the 47th Grammy Awards, Viewer's Choice at the 2004 BET Awards and received nominations for a total of four awards at the 2004 MTV Video Music Awards, the latter award show featuring a performance of the song, although it did not win in these categories, losing three of them to "Yeah!" by Usher. West would later collaborate with Johnson on Cam'ron's "Down and Out" and West's own "Donda Chant".

== Background and development ==
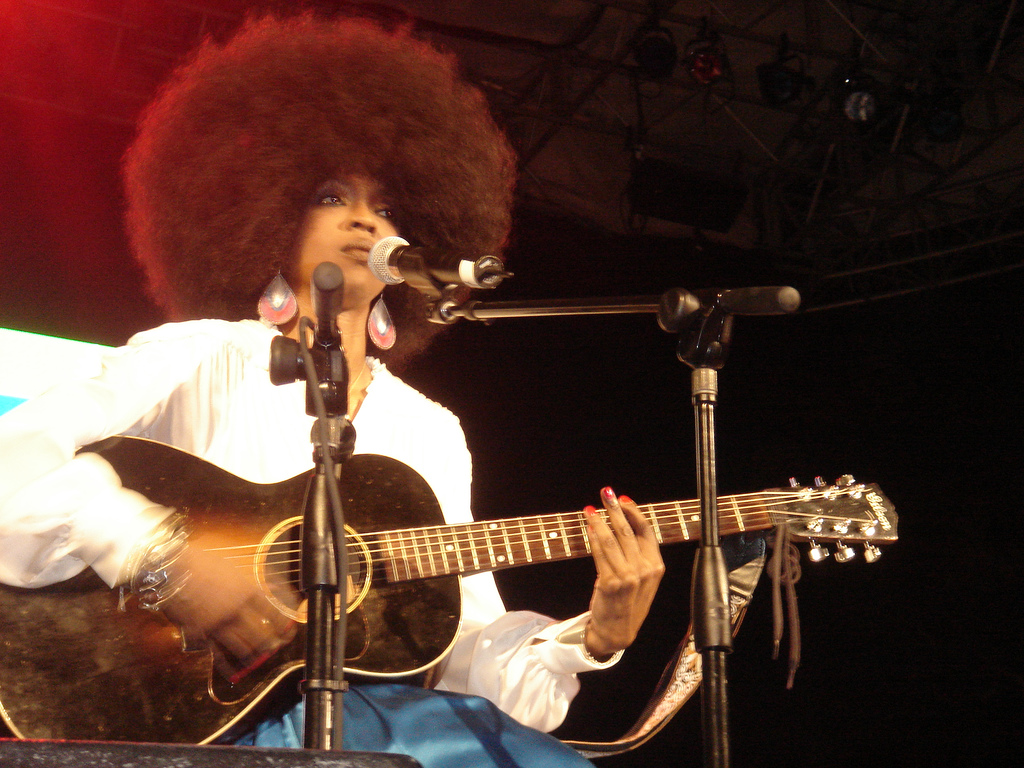
West was not able to obtain legal clearance from Lauryn Hill to sample her recording "Mystery of Iniquity" on the song, therefore he opted instead for an interpolation to be sang by Syleena Johnson in a different style.

The song contains an interpolation of "Mystery of Iniquity" by American rapper Lauryn Hill from her live album MTV Unplugged No. 2.0. West attempted to acquire legal clearance to sample the recording, with his manager John Monopoly communicating with Hill and her connections to try to find an agreement. Hill initially granted sample clearance, until it was withheld by her towards the end of the mixing and mastering process of The College Dropout. West recruited singer John Legend instead and found his take on "Mystery of Inquity" unsuitable for the hook, opting for singer-songwriter Syleena Johnson to take his place when he was across from her in the Record Plant studio. He eventually called upon Johnson to re-sing Hill's performance from "Mystery of Iniquity", which ended up on the final chorus with the line, "I'm telling you all, it all falls down." While Johnson attempted to sing the hook in Hill's style, West opted for her to sing differently as her interpolation was required to be somewhat different for legal reasons. In a 2016 interview, Johnson confirmed she first arrived in the studio to record a different song before being recruited for the song there, to her surprise. Johnson recorded her interpolation of Hill's work at 6:00 a.m. and four hours later, West made further plans with her to sing "All Falls Down" together during tours and live performances.

The song was one of those from The College Dropout that West had completely written prior to his near-fatal 2002 car accident, which was the inspiration behind "Through the Wire". In a 2013 interview for The New York Times, West expressed that when he first tried to rap, he saw similarities to contemporaries like Cam'ron, Mase, and Jay-Z. After spending time with rap duo Dead Prez and understanding how to make his rap message "sound cool", he penned "All Falls Down" in 15 minutes. The original version of the song, titled "Dreams Come True", leaked on West's demo tape The Prerequisite in April 2013, omitting the interpolation of Hill's work. West kept the demo's theme of fashion addiction and merged its lyrics into the first two verses of the track, adding a third verse addressing consumerism in the lives of oppressed African Americans. The demo's soulful strings were scrapped and it went through an early iteration known as "Self Conscious" with a different beat, evolving into "All Falls Down" during a session at Baseline Studios in New York City (NYC) with West's team that included fellow rappers 88-Keys, JB Marshall, and Consequence. At the time, 88-Keys was trying to forge a collaboration with Hill therefore he suggested West to craft work for her upcoming album, while Marshall presented "Mystery of Iniquity" to the rapper. West was heavily inspired by the song and he utilised a basic 18-track Roland V-Synth 1860 in his apartment studio for the origins of "All Falls Down", deciding to keep the recording instead of passing it on to Hill. West premiered "All Falls Down" in spoken word when he recited his poem "Self Conscious", which includes lyrics from the song, during episode 6 for season 3 of Def Poetry Jam, broadcast on May 9, 2003. West played an early version of the song that featured the Hill sample in an NYC Roc-A-Fella studio during a 2002 clip, which was featured in the Netflix documentary Jeen-Yuhs: A Kanye Trilogy (2022). Lyrically, "All Falls Down" examines the self-consciousness and insecurity within society, particularly the black community, and how these characteristics pertain to economic materialism.

== Lyrical analysis ==
"All Falls Down" sample

"All Falls Down" is placed as the fourth song of Kanye West's debut studio album, The College Dropout. The album's lyrical content is notable for containing complex societal issues, which West strives to advertently cover in ways relating to the Black American community. These thematic concepts, prevalent through the entirety of the album, are omnipresent within this specific song.

"All Falls Down" features West reflecting upon his own imperfections. The lyrics chronicle his insecurities surrounding his appearances, which he translates as an extension of problems shared with the broader population. Exploring the concept of insecurity and doubt, West tackles matters of excessive materialism and the surface-level aesthetics of affluence. West confesses to his own participation in materialistic pursuits, and the seemingly contradictory mindset thereof.

West also ties this thematic idea to an even deeper meaning. The reason this lifestyle is adopted is in an attempt to recompense for what the Black American community might have taken from people in their past. However, West scrutinizes this apparent subjugation and excessive materialism, ending with a claim that he recognizes his and others collective submission to such a lifestyle. Hip hop journalist Davey D wrote about the lyrics in his 2015 book, The Cultural Impact of Kanye West: "A number of Black pathologies including self-hate, drug abuse, and the worship of white wealth. [West] philosophically concludes that White men are the financial benefactors of all Black pathologies." West thanks Johnson for her feature at the end of the song, comparing her to a safe belt for having "saved my life".

== Music video ==
=== Background and synposis ===
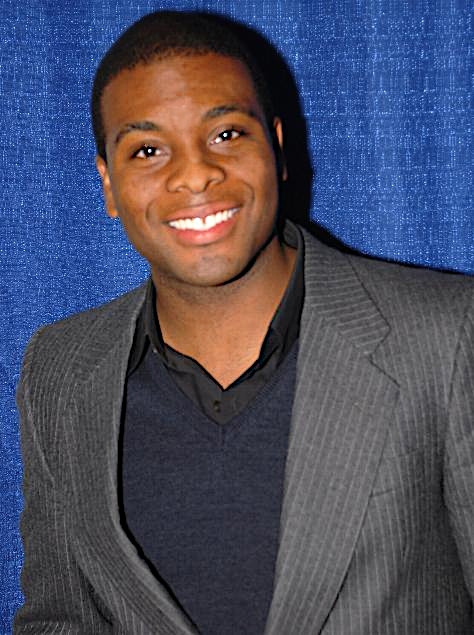
Kel Mitchell makes a cameo during the music video's scene of West going through airport security; he worked with Mitchell on shows for The College Dropout and gave him a day's notice to arrive for the clip's shooting.

The music video for "All Falls Down" was directed by filmmaker Chris Milk, shot partially at Ontario International and Los Angeles International airports. Milk explained that West's image being reflected and his hands in front of a green screen matching the reflection are "a layer filmed for his POV". He considered the video to be imperfect, having shot a mere two takes of each layer due to time constraints. After their work on the music video, West and Milk later worked together on one of the visuals for the single "Jesus Walks". As a fan of West and a fellow Chicagoan, actor Kel Mitchell was enthusiastic about being recruited for the music video; he was also involved with numerous shows for The College Dropout in 2004. Mitchell was told a day in advance that he needed to be at an airport for the visual at 5:00 a.m. and he answered, "All right! I'll be there."

The video follows West from a first-person camera angle as he accompanies his girlfriend, played by Stacey Dash, to the airport to catch her flight. Dash walks through different areas of the airport, glancing at West through her sunglasses as he follows behind. West briefly looks into the window of a nearby limousine that shows his reflection, before the pair travel to the airport in a car. The rapper later rubs his eyes in front of a bathroom mirror when the camera view changes from blurred to clear, prior to the line "it seems we living the American dream, but the people highest up got the lowest self-esteem". Cameos are featured from Mitchell, Johnson, GLC, Consequence, and Common, as West makes his way through airport security, where he is repeatedly rejected by a white official. The closing scenes are set in the third-person as West forces his way through baggage security and his skeleton appears through the screening monitor, lacking any jewellery, clothes, or skin colour.

=== Reception and accolades ===
Clash author Joe Zadeh felt the music video contains the type of cinematic ideology that would leave Slavoj Zizek "drooling on his lecture notes" from West's first-person view serving as "a voyeur on life" and when he rubs his eyes, the camera becoming clear symbolises his realisation of widely viewing things for how they really are. Zadeh surmised that the third-person scene of West placing himself through baggage security after rejection is the most ideological moment for showing his raw skeleton, lacking any of his integral features. Steve 'Flash' Juon from RapReviews was interested in the video's dilemma of rarely featuring West himself as the camera follows his girlfriend to the airport up until the security, where the rapper has an X-ray taken that Juon emphasised for showing his whole body. Rolling Stone Australia ranked the visual as the 30th greatest hip-hop video of all time and the staff member C.W. commented that it gave "a teary-eyed" view of separation, with West appearing as the genre's "sensitive, insecure, vulnerable pulse". C.W. noted the "fleeting looks" provided of West as the protagonist through his reflections in different settings, concluding that this was both a technical and emotional feat. Complex named it the 18th best music video of the 2000s decade and the staff affirmed that West's first-person view shows his focus on himself, praising Dash's walking from this view.

The visual was nominated for the awards of Best and Reelest Video at the 2004 MOBO and Vibe Awards, respectively. The music video received nominations in the categories of Best New Artist in a Video, Breakthrough Video, Best Hip-Hop Video, and Best Male Video at the 2004 MTV Video Music Awards (VMAs). At the 2004 MuchMusic Video Awards, it was nominated for the Best International Video - Artist award.

== Live performances ==
In 2003, West delivered portions of the song in spoken word for his poem "Self Conscious" on Def Poetry Jam. West performed the song with Johnson and Miri Ben-Ari for the Late Show with David Letterman in 2004, standing as his first talk show appearance. David Letterman introduced West with the title of a "record producer" and he was backed by live instrumentation, including an electric violin and Legend's piano. In the background, a person dressed as West's Dropout Bear mascot danced. The performance was listed among the top 10 hip-hop appearances on the show by Hot 100.9 and HotNewHipHop, with the latter's Nicholas DG highlighting it as "old school Kanye" over him recruiting Johnson to sing the iconic hook, incorporating live instrumentation, and deploying the Dropout Bear. West delivered a performance of the song for MTV's Total Request Live in 2004, wearing dark blue jeans, and an orange and blue striped shirt over his buttoned green shirt. He performed the song with Johnson for Dave Chappelle's Block Party on September 18, backed by the Roots. West and the singer performed the song with Legend during episode 4 for season 23 of Later... with Jools Holland in 2004. The rapper delivered a medley of the track with "Jesus Walks" and "Through the Wire" at the 2004 VMAs, marking his first set at this MTV ceremony.

West and Legend delivered a performance of the track on the first show of the Jam Sessions for American Express at a House of Blues venue in February 2005, paused by the rapper twice in the band's introduction when he did not take a liking to the groove. He provided performances of the song throughout his Touch the Sky Tour (2005–06), including a clipped, reggaeton iteration for a concert at Los Angeles' Gibson Amphitheater on December 3, 2005. On September 29, West performed the track at Abbey Road Studios in London for his 2006 live album Late Orchestration. After starting his set with "Heard 'Em Say" (2005) at the Live Earth concert in July 2007, West transitioned into a performance of "All Falls Down" and he included the track in his setlist at the Manchester International Festival that same month. On West's 2007–08 Glow in the Dark Tour, it was among the tracks performed by him after his spaceship named Jane crashed to start each concert. West performed the track for his headlining set at the 2009 Wireless Festival as he wore his aviator shades and a black suit jacket, atop an elevated section of the stage that was surrounded by four topless dancers wearing tiaras and body paint. During his headlining set for Coachella in 2011, West performed the track. West delivered performances of it during the Watch the Throne Tour (2011–12), which generated excitement amongst the audience. After removing his disco ball mask halfway into the last concert in North America of the Yeezus Tour at Nassau Coliseum in Uniondale, NY on February 23, 2014, West smiled as he delved into a set of his motivational songs, including "All Falls Down". Also in 2014, West performed the song at the Bonnaroo Music and Made in America festivals.

"All Falls Down" was the first song rapped by West during his appearance with the Sunday Service Choir for Easter at the Coachella festival of 2019, where the group surrounded him as they performed the chorus.

West closed his headlining set at the 2015 Glastonbury Festival with a performance of the track, during which he declared: "You are now watching the greatest living rock star on the planet." On August 25, 2016, West performed it for the kickoff show of his Saint Pablo Tour on a flying stage at Bankers Life Fieldhouse in Indianapolis. West performed the track at the Magnificent Coloring Day Festival in September 2016, which was hosted by Chance the Rapper in the two performers' home city of Chicago. The song was performed by West and his gospel group the Sunday Service Choir on top of hillside campsite "The Mountain" at Coachella on April 21, 2019, coinciding with Easter. This marked the first performance in the set to include rapping from West and he fumbled the song's lyrics, while the Sunday Service Choir surrounded him and sang its chorus. West performed the song with Hill during a concert at the SoFi Stadium for his Ye Live Concert Tour on April 3, 2026. Hill entered the concert's orb-shaped stage through a cloud of smoke as she wore a billowing dress; this stood as her and West's first performance together. West performed the song at Houston's Reliant Stadium for Halloween 2026; his show broke the record for the largest attendance of a stadium rap concert.

== Accolades ==
Spin named "All Falls Down" the third best song of 2004.

Awards
Year	Organization	Award	Result	Ref.
2004	BET Awards	Viewer's Choice	Nominated	
2004	MOBO Awards	Best Single	Nominated	
2004	Teen Choice Awards	Choice Music: Hip-Hop/Rap Track	Nominated	
2005	ASCAP Rhythm & Soul Music Awards	Award Winning Rap Songs	Won	
2005	ASCAP Rhythm & Soul Music Awards	Award Winning R&B/Hip-Hop Songs	Won	
2005	Grammy Awards	Best Rap/Sung Collaboration	Nominated	
2005	Groovevolt Music and Fashion Awards	Best Hip-Hop Song Performance - Solo	Nominated	

== Legacy ==
In the 2022 documentary Jenn-Yuhs, a 2002 clip is shown of West playing "All Falls Down" to marketing executive Chaka Pilgrim at the Roc-A-Fella headquarters office in NYC. Roc-A-Fella colleagues wander in and out of the room as the song plays, mostly seeming unimpressed or disintersted with West's rapping. West's then-manager Kyambo "Hip-Hop" Joshua explained that West would often give performances for those willing to listen to his songs as he was gaining confidence in his music and despite Pilgrim's lack of enthusiasm shown, various people in the office saw West's abilities, particularly younger colleagues. Complex and HotNewHipHop noted the significance of how West's Roc-A-Fella colleagues disregarded "All Falls Down", before the song eventually became viewed as a classic in his discography. In June 2025, Dash shared a recreation of the song's music video that features her wearing a green dress. Dash runs up the stairs and through the hallway of a hotel, entering an elevator where she accidentally presses the emergency button and the clip subsequently concludes.

== Track listings ==
=== 12" vinyl #1 ===
A-Side

1. "All Falls Down" (Clean)
2. "All Falls Down" (Dirty)
3. "All Falls Down" (A cappella)

B-Side

1. "Get 'Em High" (Clean)
2. "Get 'Em High" (Extended Dirty)
3. "Get 'Em High" (A cappella)

=== 12" vinyl #2 ===
A-Side

1. "All Falls Down" (Explicit)
2. "All Falls Down" (Edited)

B-Side

1. "Heavy Hitters" (Dirty)
2. "Heavy Hitters" (A cappella)

=== CD single #1 ===
1. "All Falls Down" (Album Version Explicit)
2. "Heavy Hitters" (Dirty)

=== CD single #2 ===
1. "All Falls Down"
2. "Get 'Em High"
3. "Heavy Hitters"
4. "Through the Wire"

=== CD single #3 ===
1. "All Falls Down - Explicit"
2. "All Falls Down" - Edited"
3. "Heavy Hitters (Feat. GLC)"
4. "Get 'Em High (Feat. Talib Kweli & Common)"
5. "All Falls Down - Video"

== Personnel ==
Information taken from The College Dropout liner notes.

- Songwriters: Kanye West, Lauryn Hill
- Producer: Kanye West
- Record engineer: Tatsuya Sato, Rabeka Tunei
- Mix engineer: Manny Marroquin
- Guitar: Eric "E-Bass" Johnson
- Acoustic guitar: Ken Lewis

== Charts ==
=== Weekly charts ===
Chart performance for "All Falls Down"
Chart (2004)	Peak position
Belgium (Ultratip Bubbling Under Flanders)	7
Belgium (Ultratip Bubbling Under Wallonia)	18
Canada Hot 100 (Billboard)	9
Europe (European Hot 100 Singles)	71
Germany (GfK)	72
Ireland (IRMA)	23
Netherlands (Dutch Top 40)	10
Netherlands (Single Top 100)	85
New Zealand (Recorded Music NZ)	19
Scottish Singles Sales (Official Charts)	21
UK Singles (Official Charts)	10
UK Hip Hop/R&B (Official Charts)	4
US Billboard Hot 100	7
US Hot R&B/Hip-Hop Songs (Billboard)	4
US Hot Rap Songs (Billboard)	2
US Pop Airplay (Billboard)	22
US Rhythmic Airplay (Billboard)	7

=== Year-end charts ===
Year-end chart performance for "All Falls Down"
Chart (2004)	Position
UK Singles (OCC)	158
UK Urban (Music Week)	33
US Billboard Hot 100	47
US Hot R&B/Hip-Hop Songs (Billboard)	23

== Certifications ==
Certifications for "All Falls Down"
Region	Certification	Certified units/sales
Denmark (IFPI Danmark)	Platinum	90,000^{‡}
New Zealand (RMNZ)	5× Platinum	150,000^{‡}
United Kingdom (BPI)	3× Platinum	1,800,000^{‡}
United States (RIAA)	6× Platinum	6,000,000^{‡}
^{‡} Sales+streaming figures based on certification alone.

== Release history ==
Release dates and formats for "All Falls Down"
Region	Date	Format(s)	Label(s)	Ref.
United States	March 8, 2004	Rhythmic contemporary · urban contemporary radio	Roc-A-Fella, IDJMG	
United States	April 26, 2004	Contemporary hit radio	Roc-A-Fella, IDJMG	
