= Chapter 1: Love, Pain & Forgiveness =

Studio album by Syleena Johnson
- Released: May 15, 2001
- Recorded: 1999–2001
- Genre: R&B; soul; neo soul
- Length: 58:04
- Label: Jive
- Producer: Timmy Allen; Larry "Rock" Campbell; R. Kelly; Joel Kipnis; Bob Power

Syleena Johnson chronology
Love Hangover (1998)	Chapter 1: Love, Pain & Forgiveness (2001)	Chapter 2: The Voice (2002)

Chapter 1: Love, Pain & Forgiveness is the debut studio album by American singer Syleena Johnson. It was released on May 15, 2001, through Jive Records. Her debut with the label, Johnson worked with Bob Power on the majority of the album, while additional production was provided by Joel Kipnis, Larry "Rock" Campbell, Timmy Allen, and R. Kelly. Upon its release, Chapter 1 debuted and peaked at number 101 on the US Billboard 200 and entered the top 20 on the Top R&B/Hip-Hop Albums chart.

== Background and recording ==
Chapter 1: Love, Pain & Forgiveness is Syleena Johnson's major-label debut following her demo album Love Hangover, released in 2000 with the independent label Twinight Records. In 1997 Johnson had attended a charity event hosted by R. Kelly, and soon after she got in contact with Jive Records scout Wayne Williams. Johnson sent a demo tape to the record company and in 1998 she signed with Jive, starting writing for Chapter 1 soon after. The album had a first release date of July 2000, which was repeatedly delayed because of Jive's indecision on what song to release as single.

== Release and promotion ==
The album's lead single "I Am Your Woman" was released on February 12; written, produced and arranged by R. Kelly, its music video was one of BET's most-played clips for the weeks of March 25, May 6, May 13 and June 10, 2001. The album's second single "Hit On Me" addresses the theme of domestic violence; with this song, Johnson associated herself with the National Domestic Violence Hotline, by displaying the organization's phone number in the song's music video and visiting women's shelters. It was the first partnership between the organization and a recording artist.

In June 2001, Chapter 1: Love, Pain & Forgiveness reached number one at Billboard's Heatseeker Album Chart for new recording artists. Also on that date, the album peaked at number 101 on the US Billboard 200, spending a total of 9 weeks on the chart. On the Billboard Top R&B/Hip-Hop Albums chart, the album reached its peak position at number 16, and was on the chart for a total of twenty-one weeks.

== Critical reception ==
Professional ratings
Review scores
Source	Rating
AllMusic	4/5 stars
NME	4/5 stars
Vibe	4.5/5 stars

Chapter 1: Love, Pain & Forgiveness received positive reviews from critics. Jon Azpiri of AllMusic praised the album's musical direction and production, describing the album as a "remarkably polished effort". Mark Anthony Neal of PopMatters said that the album "is a very personal narrative, largely conceived as Johnson recovered from a very damaging romantic relationship" and described it as a reminiscent of Sunshine Anderson's debut. He later added, "Syleena Johnson's debut is a refreshing tribute to a time when soul music was molasses thick (Alaga style) and suffocatingly personal." Diana Evans of NME gave a positive reception towards the album's production and musical style saying the album charts the "changing emotions of a woman surviving, sometimes not, within a difficult relationship." Billboard stated: "With a seasoned sound that belies her 24 years, Syleena Johnson comes by her chops naturally: Dad is '70s R&B/blues singer Syl Johnson." They also described Johnson's vocals as "bluesy" and "gut-wrenched", comparing them to Aretha Franklin, Patti LaBelle, Betty Wright, and Millie Jackson. Writing for Entertainment Weekly, Soren Baker wrote: "This Chicago singer belts out soulful tales of woe with equal parts bitterness and indomitability on her powerful debut album." In Billboard's review of the album, Johnson was compared favourably to her R&B contemporaries, with People magazine setting Johnson "apart from all of today’s overproduced, ultra-glossy Destiny’s Child wannabes".

== Aftermath ==
Despite the critical acclaim of Chapter 1: Love, Pain & Forgiveness, Johnson admitted her disappointment in the album's sales figures, with the album experiencing a lack of commercial success. In January 2019, following the release of the documentary Surviving R. Kelly, Johnson revisited the song "I Am Your Woman" and its lyrics, claiming that she could "no longer perform the track".

== Track listing ==
No.	Title	Producer(s)	Length
1.	"The Beginning (Intro)"	Bob Power	0:45
2.	"I Am Your Woman"	R. Kelly	4:27
3.	"You Said" (featuring Liberty City)	Power	4:10
4.	"Baby I'm So Confused"	Larry "Rock" Campbell; Timmy Allen	4:49
5.	"Meanwhile... (Interlude)"	Power	0:44
6.	"Everybody Wants Something"	Power	4:38
7.	"You Got Me Spinnin'"	JK; David Flemming	4:26
8.	"Hit On Me"	Power	4:26
9.	"And Then... (Interlude)"	Power	1:08
10.	"He's Gonna Do You In" (featuring Buddy Guy)	Power	4:35
11.	"You Ain't Right"	Power	4:43
12.	"Ain't No Love"	Power	4:48
13.	"One Day"	Power	4:59
14.	"I'd Rather Be Wrong"	Power	4:41
15.	"All Of Me"	Power	3:46
16.	"The End (Outro)"	Power	1:03

== Charts ==
Chart (2001)	Peak position
US Billboard 200	101
US Top R&B/Hip-Hop Albums (Billboard)	16
US Heatseekers Albums (Billboard)	1

== Release history ==
Region	Date	Label	Ref.
United States	May 15, 2001	Jive; Sony Legacy	
France	May 16, 2001	Sony	
Japan	May 21, 2001	Sony	
Italy	May 30, 2001	Sony	
Australia	June 7, 2001	Sony	
United Kingdom	July 16, 2001	Jive	
Germany	March 17, 2002	Jive	
