= Mystery of Iniquity =

2002 song by Lauryn Hill

Song by Lauryn Hill

from the album MTV Unplugged No. 2.0
- Released: May 7, 2002
- Recorded: July 21, 2001
- Genre: Acoustic hip-hop; spoken word
- Length: 4:58
- Label: Columbia
- Songwriter: Lauryn Hill
- Producer: Lauryn Hill

"Mystery of Iniquity" is a song by American singer Lauryn Hill from her live album MTV Unplugged No. 2.0 (2002). The song was written and produced by Hill, with MTV Unplugged producer Alex Coletti also being credited with production. Lyrically, the song finds Hill addressing capitalism and systemic injustice within the American legal and political systems. "Mystery of Iniquity" was nominated for a Grammy Award for Best Female Rap Solo Performance. The track saw renewed attention when Kanye West interpolated it for his 2004 single "All Falls Down", which became his first major commercial hit.

== Composition ==
The song addresses themes of truth and corruption within American institutions, particularly the legal system. Hill employs courtroom imagery, while referencing "crooked lawyers," "false indictments," and "judicial extortion," and frames the court as a spectacle where injustice is normalized. She performs the track using both freestyle rap and spoken word elements. The song's title is drawn from a biblical phrase found in 2 Thessalonians 2:7, which refers to a hidden force of rebellion and lawlessness. Laura Mam detailed the song as a "combination piece of spoken word and melody".

An AV Club article characterized the lyrics "as a furious attack on the musicians who sued Hill for credit and compensation, and as a harsh rebuke of President Bush and abuses of power in general." In a 2022 article from The Grio, Hill's verse "The revolving door, insanity every floor / Skyscraping, paper chasing, what are we working for?" was interpreted as a condemnation of capitalism. The journalist describes the song as part of a lineage of poetic protest by Black writers, linking her work to Langston Hughes and Bob Marley.

== Reception ==
"Mystery of Iniquity" was praised for its lyrical ambition and emotional urgency. The song's spoken-word cadence and intense critique of systemic injustice were described as a highlight of Hill's MTV Unplugged No. 2.0 performance. In 2003, the track received a nomination for the Grammy Award for Best Female Rap Solo Performance at the 45th Annual Grammy Awards.

The song has since been cited in academic, spiritual, and cultural discussions. UDiscoverMusic noted that "Mystery of Iniquity", along with other songs from MTV Unplugged No. 2.0, sound "strikingly prescient" and called the performance "well worth revisiting". In 2017, Revolt argued that Hill was "telling it like it is" and noted the song's relevance to sentiments now echoed in modern discourse around self-improvement and protest, writing that it expresses "the identical sentiments to what everyone is feeling right now".

Scholar Mychal Denzel Smith, writing for Mic, framed the song as part of a broader ideological vision. He described "the elaborately constrained divine reversals and social revolution latent in "Mystery of Iniquity", envisioning it within a future where "Black folks can enjoy romance and robust legal protection in still-racist America… and overcome the tired culture change versus structural change debates". In The Cultural Impact of Kanye West, scholar Julius Bailey called the track a "scathing and soulful critique" of the U.S. legal and political systems, exposing "manipulation and deceit beneath the façade of power." Bailey further connects its critique of education and justice to West's interpolation in "All Falls Down", noting the "inevitable collapse of these constructed systems".

A 2022 article published in America described Hill's performance of "Mystery of Iniquity" as a critique of corporate and state power, with lyrics that highlight the illusion of the American dream. The piece notes Hill's unflinching delivery of verses such as: "Y'all can't handle the truth in a courtroom of lies", and "Counterfeit wisdom creating the illusion of freedom", framing the performance as both political and prophetic. The article compares Hill's role in the song to that of a modern-day prophet, drawing parallels between her public reception and the misunderstood figures of scripture.

== Influence and sampling ==
"Mystery of Iniquity" gained renewed attention when Kanye West interpolated the song's chorus for his 2004 single "All Falls Down". West originally wanted to sample Hill's version directly, but was denied sample clearance. He instead enlisted singer Syleena Johnson to perform the hook. British singer Jorja Smith opens her 2018 song "Lifeboats", from the album Lost & Found, by echoing the phrase "all falls down", from the chorus of "Mystery of Iniquity".

"Mystery of Iniquity" continues to be recognized in discussions of justice, faith, and artistic autonomy, and has appeared in cultural playlists, including BET's "#StayWoke" collection inspired by Jesse Williams' BET Humanitarian Award speech and "Cordae's Playback", a playlist curated by rapper Cordae and Billboard for Black History Month.

== Live performances ==
"Mystery of Iniquity" was recorded live on July 21, 2001, for the television series MTV Unplugged. Hill has since performed the song during several major appearances, including at Austin City Limits in 2016 and at the 2015 Afropunk Festival, where it was called a highlight of the set.
