= MTV Unplugged No. 2.0 =

Live album by Lauryn Hill
- Released: May 7, 2002
- Recorded: July 21, 2001
- Venue: MTV Studios in New York
- Genres: Acoustic pop; folk; soul
- Length: 106:36
- Label: Columbia
- Producers: Lauryn Hill; Alex Coletti

Lauryn Hill chronology
The Miseducation of Lauryn Hill (1998)	MTV Unplugged No. 2.0 (2002)

MTV Unplugged No. 2.0 is a live album by American singer Lauryn Hill. It was released on May 7, 2002, by Columbia Records. The performance was recorded on July 21, 2001, at MTV Studios in Times Square and directed by Alex Coletti for the television series MTV Unplugged. Hill played a set of previously unreleased, newly written acoustic songs and a cover of Bob Marley's "So Much Things to Say" performing without a band, while playing guitar and pregnant with her third child, YG Marley. It was produced by both Hill and Coletti.

Its lyrics center on themes of religion, personal growth, mental health, and abuse of authority, alongside spoken interludes. Songs such as "I Find It Hard to Say (Rebel)", written in response to the 1999 police killing of Amadou Diallo, and "Mystery of Iniquity", address police brutality and inequality in the justice system, while "I Gotta Find Peace of Mind" depicts a search for inner peace.

Upon release, the album debuted at number three on the US Billboard 200 with first-week sales of 122,000 copies, marking the highest debut for an Unplugged release by a female artist until Alicia Keys' Unplugged (2005). It was later certified platinum by the Recording Industry Association of America. Additionally, the album reached the top ten in several international markets, including Japan and Canada. It was promoted with a headlining set during the 2002 Smokin Grooves Tour, with Questlove opening for Hill.

The performance marked a sharp shift in Hill's musical style and public image. Critics were initially divided, with some reviewers describing the performances as "too raw" and unpolished, while others praised its sincerity and self-examination. Over time, the album received retrospective critical praise. The New York Times identified the album's lyrics as a precursor to the modern sociopolitical understanding of "woke", while scholars and journalists such as Kathy Iandoli have described it as "ahead of its time" in relation to movements like Black Lives Matter and MeToo. It has been widely cited as an influence by a range of hip hop, R&B, and pop artists and sampled by musicians including Kanye West, Frank Ocean, A$AP Rocky, and Method Man. "Mystery of Iniquity" received a Grammy nomination for Best Female Rap Solo Performance.

== Background and release ==
MTV Unplugged No. 2.0 was recorded on July 21, 2001, at MTV Studios in Times Square, New York City. Hill performed onstage wearing denim and a baseball cap, playing original material and Bob Marley covers on acoustic guitar without a backing band. During the performance, Hill announced her pregnancy with her third child, Joshua. According to her longtime partner Rohan Marley, MTV approached him directly about having Hill appear on their MTV Unplugged series, and he later encouraged her to participate independently of her record label. Marley recalled that Hill frequently carried a bookbag filled with reading material and said she was deeply inspired by both the Bible and other works of literature.

Series creator Alex Coletti explained that the performance deviated from the shows' typical format by featuring entirely new, unreleased material solo on acoustic guitar, stating, "The concept was always to take songs we know and break them down to their beginnings, but we don’t know these songs. It's like being in Lauryn's bedroom watching her write the stuff". He described the material as "bossa nova to acoustic hip-hop to Joan Armatrading-type music and Bob Marley influences". In a separate interview, Coletti remembered first hearing from the pregnant singer while on vacation, saying, "She said, 'I taught myself how to play guitar, I've written a bunch of new songs and I want to do them acoustic'". Coletti relayed the proposal to MTV's then-president Van Toffler, who agreed to move forward. "We did it, and it was pretty special", he said. "There were some definite 4 A.M. phone calls in the remix phase and some things got a little weird, but it's definitely a standout show that people still talk about".

Originally scheduled for a fall 2001 release, MTV Unplugged No. 2.0 was delayed due to the September 11 attacks. The album was later released on May 7, 2002, debuting at number three on the Billboard 200, and number two on the Top R&B/Hip-Hop Albums chart. It was certified Platinum by the Recording Industry Association of America (RIAA) the following month, and remained on the charts for several months. Internationally, MTV Unplugged No. 2.0 also saw notable chart success. It reached the top five in Austria, France, and Switzerland, and entered the top ten in Japan, Norway, and Sweden. The album also peaked at number 10 on the European Top 100 Albums chart and performed strongly in Canada, where it topped the R&B chart and reached number nine overall.

The track "Mystery of Iniquity" was nominated at the 45th Grammy Awards for Best Female Rap Solo Performance.

== Music and lyrics ==
For MTV Unplugged No. 2.0, Hill departed from the hip hop sounds of her debut album The Miseducation of Lauryn Hill (1998) in favor of austerely performed acoustic soul and folk-based songs. She jokingly described herself as a "hip-hop folk singer", and according to Robert Hilburn, assumed the role of a folk singer accompanied only by her acoustic guitar. Rather than singing any of her previous hits, Hill debuted all new songs in a folk style and, in between songs, spoke at length about her personal and artistic struggles.

In a 2001 interview, Hill explained her musical choices, stating, "I had to work through that voice telling me, "People don't want to hear that. You ain't got no beat. Who do you think you are, playing that guitar?" I had to talk back to that voice and say, "You know what? Just because I have a guitar, it doesn't mean that changes me. I still rhyme, I still sing." The means that God gave me to express myself with right now — it's very freeing. I don't have to check with nobody. I can stop. I can pause. I can mess up. I can start again. I can go to another song. I can do anything."

== Reception ==
Professional ratings
Review scores
Source	Rating
AllMusic	4/5 stars
Encyclopedia of Popular Music	2/5 stars
Entertainment Weekly	B–
The Guardian	2/5 stars
NME	5/10
Q	4/5 stars
Rolling Stone	3.5/5 stars
The Rolling Stone Album Guide	2/5 stars
Slant Magazine	2.5/5 stars
The Village Voice	D−

MTV Unplugged No. 2.0 received a wide range of reactions upon its release from critics and industry figures. Among those in attendance at the taping was Christopher John Farley, who called the set as "one of the strongest concerts I've been to in some time", comparing it to MTV Unplugged in New York and named it an emotionally "moving" experience. Sway Calloway referred to it as "one of the most honest performances I've ever seen".

However, others expressed reservations about Hill's direction. In a 2003 Rolling Stone cover story, an anonymous veteran music executive commented, "Anyone with ears can hear there are only three chords being played on every song. I saw it with a roomful of professionals, and someone said, 'I feel like jumpin' out a window'". Meanwhile, Rolling Stone writer Touré described her honesty as both "touching and confusing".

Critics reviews often noted the album's unorthodox format and emotionally raw presentation, while others questioned its artistic discipline. In The Village Voice, Robert Christgau called it one of the "worst album[s] ever released by an artist of substance", finding the songs overlong, verbose, and unmelodic. Christgau was also critical of Hill's vocal performance and limited guitar arrangements. However, Village Voice critic Miles Marshall Lewis viewed the album as "the most powerful artistic document to emerge from hip-hop America post-9/11". While acknowledging its technical flaws and sparse arrangements, Lewis compared Unplugged to Bruce Springsteen's 1982 album Nebraska, describing it as a "commercially alienating personal project".

In the Los Angeles Times, Robert Hilburn described the album as "as messy as a car wreck creatively", yet commended Hill's courage, stating that "few artists would have the strength to move away so boldly from an approach that had brought her such commercial success and acclaim". Hilburn cited songs such as "I Find It Hard to Say", "Just Like Water", and "I Gotta Find Peace of Mind" as echoing the artistic strengths shown on The Miseducation of Lauryn Hill. AllMusic's William Ruhlmann conceded that Hill's spoken interludes sounded vain and foolish but still felt the album was "fascinating" as an "unfinished, unflinching presentation of ideas and of a person". Q was more enthusiastic, finding her songs beautifully sincere and performed austerely in a way that recalled the vibrant quality of Bob Marley's "Redemption Song" (1980).

Entertainment Weekly writer David Browne said it was "perhaps the most bizarre follow-up in the history of [popular music]", appreciating some of the music's "poetic flow" but finding it exhausting to hear Hill's "strummed sermons directed at unspecified enemies and soul crushers". Alexis Petridis panned the record as "messy" and "inconsequential", mostly because of what he felt were her clichéd self-help lyrics and self-indulgent monologues: "A scant handful of powerful moments, including a furious meditation on the police shooting of a young black man, 'I Find It Hard to Say (Rebel)', are outweighed by repetitious rambling." In a mostly favorable review, Billboard described Hill's performance as "bold and brave", and highlighted tracks like "Just Want You Around", "Just Like Water", "I Get Out", and "I Gotta Find Peace of Mind" as standouts within a "potent—albeit perplexing—performance".

One early review likened the album to John Lennon's Plastic Ono Band (1970), acknowledging Hill's willingness to dismantle celebrity and embrace discomfort. The piece compared her emotional delivery to the vulnerability of Joni Mitchell's Blue (1971), the rebellious spirit of Courtney Love, and the vocal soulfulness of Gladys Knight. Time noted the "sweetness of her voice" and compared the songs "Mr. Intentional" and "Oh, Jerusalem" to the work of Bob Dylan, stated that Hill reminded audiences that "no matter what she says, she's a performer after all".

The album also drew divided reactions from fellow artists. In a 2002 CNN interview, Britney Spears stated that she had been listening to the album in rotation and praised it as "amazing", adding, "It's kind of sad, but it's good. It's a feel-good album". That same year, Felix Buxton of Basement Jaxx remarked that "it's nice hearing someone talking about their music and their struggles", while describing her as "absolutely loaded" and questioning some of her repeated focus on reality. Buxton further referred to Hill as a "postmodern pseudo-realist" grappling openly with fame and personal transformation.

Some in the hip hop community were more critical of Hill's departure from her signature Hip-Hop and Neo-Soul sound. On the 8 Mile: Music from and Inspired by the Motion Picture soundtrack song "Love Me", rapper 50 Cent referenced Unplugged directly, rapping, "Used to listen to Lauryn Hill and tap my feet / Then the bitch put out a CD and didn’t have no beats".

== Marketing and touring ==
Hill began previewing new material from the album in the early 2000s, most notably being her performance at the 2001 Essence Awards, where she debuted "Adam Lives in Theory". Hill appeared onstage with a shaved head, seated on a stool with an acoustic guitar, featuring a similar setup to the stripped-down aesthetic of her upcoming MTV Unplugged set. The moment was described as a stark departure from her earlier public image, which journalist Kathy Iandoli described as "a person we seemingly never saw again".

Following the album's release Hill co-headlined the 2002 Smokin' Grooves tour, alongside OutKast and The Roots. The tour marked her first major live appearances since The Miseducation Tour, and included songs like "Mystery of Iniquity", "Freedom Time", and "Just Like Water", as well as selections from her debut album.

Critics noted her anti-commercial presentation. The New York Times wrote that she appeared as an artist "determined not to be a pop commodity anymore", wielding her guitar to sing "about breaking free". DJ Nu-Mark similarly praised Hill's minimalist setup, which he described as "without a full entourage, or a drum machine, or a DJ behind her", likening it to "looking into her soul".

Audience members recalled Hill entering without introduction, and later modestly exiting after performing her closing song "I Get Out", by removing her hat, wiping her face and walking away quietly. Dr. Dre protégé Truth Hurts later recalled that Prince attended the Minneapolis stop specifically to watch Hill's performance.

The final date of the Smokin' Grooves tour reportedly took place on Thanksgiving night in Seattle. Questlove, who DJed before her set, remembered playing protest songs from singers like Gene McDaniels before she entered the stage. In a conversation with MTV News, he stated "Lauryn, she's the rabble-rouser. She's doing it without a band — she's doing it with a guitar. A lot of her diehard fans are thrown off and hope she would go back to doing one Fugees song or one song off of [The Miseduction of Lauryn Hill]. ... But I've seen people crying [when she sings]".

== Legacy ==
=== Critical reappraisal and rankings ===
MTV Unplugged No. 2.0 represented a notable artistic departure for Lauryn Hill, and was later included by Rolling Stone in its list of "The 25 Boldest Career Moves in Music History", ranking as the highest entry by a woman. In the years since its release, the performance has undergone a significant reappraisal, receiving increased acclaim. The Guardian praised it as Hill's "brilliant hurrah" and one of MTV's greatest moments. In a 2025 retrospective, The Washington Post asserted that "no other 'Unplugged' performance has done as much to define an artist", and named it among the greatest MTV Unplugged sets. The article further noted that "more than 20 years later, Hill's sermons about losing herself to the music industry and fame hit with terrible resonance".

The set has been recognized in multiple retrospective rankings for its impact and uniqueness, most notably in lists highlighting the most memorable MTV Unplugged performances, and has also been cited among the best live R&B and hip hop albums. In his list of the 15 best MTV Unplugged episodes, Andy Greene of Rolling Stone characterized the performance as "the most unique, unpolished Unplugged ever to see the light of day". The New York Times hailed the album as a "classic performance", with journalist Noel Murray referring to it as a "mesmerizing look at a pop star who dared to reinvent herself in public", while drawing parallels between the album and the work of Nina Simone. Writing for Vulture, Lindsey Weber wrote "looking back, it was a brave decision for a young artist to make and ultimately true to the Unplugged format."

In a retrospective review, Daryl McIntosh wrote that the album "points straight into the soul of this once-in-a-lifetime artist in raw form, exposing both the brilliance that we fell in love with when we first heard her voice and the fragility of the human spirit." Wired journalist Jason Parham reflected on the reception of MTV Unplugged No. 2.0, stating that in the years following The Miseducation of Lauryn Hill, "Hill's genius was cast as obnoxious and difficult. But the work itself could not be denied". In an interview with The Root, John Legend said he had been a fan of the Unplugged album, stating that while the album might not be "listener-friendly" it is full of "real gems". In a 2016 retrospective, The A.V. Club coined the term "Secret Fiascocess" to describe the album's impact, characterizing the first half as "intentionally self-sabotaging", while acknowledging its second disc as a "secret success".

=== Critical reflections on influence ===
During her podcast Still Processing, Jenna Wortham described Hill's performance on MTV Unplugged No. 2.0 as "devastatingly iconic", while noting its critique of fame, the music industry, and sexism. She interpreted that Kanye West's use of "Mystery of Iniquity" on "All Falls Down" with Syleena Johnson was not only a sample but a form of musical lineage and archival work honoring Hill's influence. Slant Magazine opined that Alicia Keys invoked "Unplugged-era" Hill on her acoustic anti-capitalism protest song "Kill Your Mama" from her 2016 album Here. Music critic Jenn Pelly cited MTV Unplugged No. 2.0 as a key precedent for polarizing but emotionally honest live performances. She wrote that Lauryn Hill's "biblical hip-hop folk profundities" and her decision to present "the truest version of herself" rather than conform to commercial expectations laid the groundwork for a generation of artists, including Frank Ocean.

The album's spoken interludes, initially criticized as rambling or self-indulgent, have also gained greater appreciation over time, attracting scholarly analysis, being quoted by writers, and referenced by artists like Kanye West and actress Taylor Russell.

=== Themes and social commentary ===
In America, Stephen G. Adubato reflected that the album, despite its initial mixed reception, "leaves listeners with questions and provocations that are just as relevant as they were 20 years ago, if not more so. Hill's ability to wrestle with the realities of original sin and grace—as they apply to both her own life and the institutions that hold power in our society today—echo the prophetic sensibilities of the greatest religious figures and musical artists" for the album's 20th anniversary.

Katy Iandoli of Revolt praised MTV Unplugged No. 2.0's socially driven material, describing songs "I Get Out" and "Mr. Intentional" as the constructs of modern-day thinkpieces rooted in self-empowerment and "letting go", calling the album "ahead of its time". This sentiment was echoed by TheGrio, which named it one of ten releases they considered ahead of their time in a 2022 article. The Boombox argued that the album featured "some wonderful songwriting", and likened tracks like "Adam Lives in Theory", "Just Like Water" and "Mystery of Iniquity" to the musical work of Bob Marley. Singer Ledisi praised Hill's contribution to protest music, saying "I love the work that Lauryn Hill did when she was speaking of those things… we have that in our era as well, it’s just not celebrated enough".

== Cultural influence ==
=== Artistic influence ===
MTV Unplugged No. 2.0 has been cited by numerous artists and writers for its significance and influence on their work. Adele named the album as an inspiration for her own unplugged session on VH1, telling MTV News "My favorite one is the Lauryn Hill one; I've got that one on CD as well. I've never been so choked up by something, and it was so refreshing". She also praised Hill's artistry during the performance, stating, "that broken look, just her and a guitar, her banter between the songs — I felt like how I feel when I hear Etta James. I was just like, 'I totally get it. She's in my head, she's in my heart, she knows me".

In a 2014 Entertainment Weekly interview, English singer Ed Sheeran ranked Hill's Unplugged set among the series' standout entries, alongside Unplugged (1992) by Eric Clapton and MTV Unplugged in New York (1994) by Nirvana, while calling it "great". Katy Perry also listed it as a personal favorite, stating "I remember listening to Nirvana and Lauryn Hill and wanting to do that one day". Singer Sam Smith once referred to it as "My Bible" in a tweet. Songwriter Jack Antonoff credited MTV Unplugged No. 2.0 as a major creative influence during an interview on Total Request Live referring to the album as life-changing.

Writer and comedian Neal Brennan stated that he and Dave Chappelle watched Hill's set on VHS "over and over" while writing the sketch comedy television series Chappelle's Show. Author Casey Gerald included "I Get Out" and "I Remember" in a PBS playlist accompanying his 2018 memoir There Will Be No Miracles Here, stating that their themes of rebellion and remembrance "mirror the spirit and intention" of his book. Actress America Ferrera wrote in her book American Like Me: Reflections on Life Between Cultures that the album helped her accept her African ancestry. Jerrod Carmichael cited "I Just Want You Around" as a source of personal comfort, and stated that he prefers MTV Unplugged No. 2.0 to The Miseducation of Lauryn Hill.

Women in both hip hop and R&B have acknowledged MTV Unplugged No. 2.0 as a creative influence, including Ella Mai, Samara Cyn, Celeste, Kelela, Doechii, and Sinéad Harnett. Songwriter H.E.R. named "Just Like Water" from MTV Unplugged No. 2.0 as one of her favorite Lauryn Hill songs, while recalling how Hill influenced her early songwriting. Rapsody credited the album as foundational to her personal work, stating that she often listened to it while recording her 2023 album Please Don't Cry, and later covering "Adam Lives in Theory" for Amazon Music.

=== Sampling ===
The album's songs have also been widely sampled and reinterpreted. According to music executive JB Marshall, MTV Unplugged No. 2.0 was a major influence on Kanye West's 2004 debut studio album The College Dropout, recalling that it was considered "like the Bible" during the album's creation, leading to West's interpolation of "Mystery of Iniquity" on "All Falls Down". ASAP Rocky and Frank Ocean sampled "I Gotta Find Peace of Mind" for their track "Purity", the closing song on ASAP Rocky's album Testing (2018). Pitchfork noted Hill's influence as essential to the song's emotional resonance, referring to it as the moment where ASAP Rocky "finally grasps that ineffable quality that makes artists like Hill and Ocean iconic: humanity". Ocean also interpolated "Just Like Water" on his track with Jazmine Sullivan on the song "Rushes" from his 2016 visual album Endless, and Wu-Tang Clan member Method Man sampled Hill's vocals on "Say", the lead single from his 2006 solo album 4:21... The Day After.

=== Protest, activism, and cultural influence ===
Solange Knowles cited MTV Unplugged No. 2.0 as an inspiration for her album A Seat at the Table (2016), and hailed it as a rare example of a Black artist occupying a space usually reserved for punk performers, who are embraced for their disruption, rage, and anti-establishment expression. She stated "That's something that Black artists are not usually able to do, especially R&B artists," adding that Hill sang "some real shit… disruptive things that are going to shake some people up". She also reflected on the backlash Hill faced at the time and noted how public perception has evolved, with audiences now embracing the album's messages.

Jason Russell, creator of Kony 2012, cited Hill's quote from MTV Unplugged No. 2.0 ("Fantasy is what people want but reality is what they need") as part of his inspiration for the film's message. Hill re-released the song "I Find It Hard to Say (rebel)" in 2016 amid the rise of the Black Lives Matter movement. The original song was written in response to the 1999 police killing of Amadou Diallo in New York City. Joe Talbot of the post-punk band Idles described Hill's original version as a spiritual song about breaking down and regaining strength. The song was also sampled by Egyptian hip hop artist Arabian Knightz during the Arab Spring uprisings, alleging that they were blocked from releasing the song until Egypt's internet censorship was lifted. Similarly, Hill's "Freedom Time" has been used as a protest song, including by Palestinian-American rapper Phay in his 2024 single "Watermelon Seeds", written in response to the Israeli bombing of Gaza. Poet and activist Donte Clark cited the album as part of his personal reflection and inspiration.

=== Musicianship and performance influence ===
Publications have noted Hill's use of the nylon-string classical guitar during the performance as a prominent example of the instrument's role in contemporary music. British singer Lianne La Havas cited the album and Hill's guitar playing as an inspiration, stating, "[I was inspired by] Lauryn Hill’s MTV Unplugged. I already loved The Miseducation… and the Fugees, and finding out that she played guitar was mind-blowing." In an interview with Billboard, rapper B.o.B cited Hill's guitar playing as inspiration for his career, stating, "Lauryn Hill was a huge influence to my guitar playing, her whole Unplugged DVD that she did… I mean, it just changed my life. It kind of gave me the inspiration to keep going, [to] invest a lot more time into the music and not the stuff that doesn’t matter."

== Track listing ==
All tracks are written by Lauryn Hill, except "So Much Things to Say", a cover of the Bob Marley and the Wailers song written by Bob Marley.

Disc one
No.	Title	Length
1.	"Intro"	2:28
2.	"Mr. Intentional"	6:58
3.	"Adam Lives in Theory"	7:26
4.	"Interlude 1"	1:55
5.	"Oh Jerusalem"	8:54
6.	"Interlude 2"	1:21
7.	"Freedom Time"	4:59
8.	"Interlude 3"	3:18
9.	"I Find It Hard to Say (Rebel)"	6:50
10.	"Just Like Water"	6:09
11.	"Interlude 4"	1:41
12.	"Just Want You Around"	4:36
13.	"I Gotta Find Peace of Mind"	9:19

Disc two
No.	Title	Length
1.	"Interlude 5"	12:12
2.	"Mystery of Iniquity"	5:11
3.	"Interlude 6"	1:42
4.	"I Get Out"	5:17
5.	"Interlude 7"	0:20
6.	"I Remember"	3:46
7.	"So Much Things to Say"	5:59
8.	"The Conquering Lion"	3:20
9.	"Outro"	2:57
Total length:		106:36

== Personnel ==
- Lauryn Hill – acoustic guitar, vocals, production
- Julian Alexander – art direction
- Adam Blackburn – recording, mixing
- Alex Coletti – mixing, editing, film production on video broadcast
- Joe DeMaio – direction on video broadcast
- Max Feldman – recording assistance
- Scott Gries – photography
- Christopher Koch – audio post-editing technician
- Mel Papaterpou – guitar technician
- Sue Pelino – audio post-mixing technician
- Herb Powers Jr. – mastering
- Van Toffler – executive production on video broadcast
- Quincy S. Jackson - Marketing

== Charts ==
=== Weekly charts ===
2002 weekly chart performance for MTV Unplugged No. 2.0
Chart (2002–2003)	Peak position
Australian Albums (ARIA)	16
Australian Urban Albums (ARIA)	3
Austrian Albums (Ö3 Austria)	2
Belgian Albums (Ultratop Flanders)	34
Belgian Albums (Ultratop Wallonia)	24
Canadian Albums (Billboard)	9
Canadian R&B Albums (Nielsen SoundScan)	1
Danish Albums (Hitlisten)	28
Dutch Albums (Album Top 100)	40
European Top 100 Albums (Music & Media)	10
French Albums (SNEP)	4
German Albums (Offizielle Top 100)	30
Irish Albums (IRMA)	43
Italian Albums (FIMI)	25
Japanese Albums (Oricon)	8
New Zealand Albums (RMNZ)	35
Norwegian Albums (VG-lista)	5
Scottish Albums (Official Charts)	38
Swedish Albums (Sverigetopplistan)	10
Swiss Albums (Schweizer Hitparade)	3
UK Albums (Official Charts)	40
UK R&B Albums (Official Charts)	6
US Billboard 200	3
US Top R&B/Hip-Hop Albums (Billboard)	2

2022 weekly chart performance for MTV Unplugged No. 2.0
Chart (2022)	Peak
Greece Albums (IFPI Greece)	7

=== Year-end charts ===
Year-end chart performance for MTV Unplugged No. 2.0
Chart (2002)	Position
Austrian Albums (Ö3 Austria)	74
Canadian Albums (Nielsen SoundScan)	184
Canadian R&B Albums (Nielsen SoundScan)	33
French Albums (SNEP)	76
Swiss Albums (Schweizer Hitparade)	56
US Billboard 200	197
US Top R&B/Hip-Hop Albums (Billboard)	85

== Certifications ==
Certifications for MTV Unplugged No. 2.0
Region	Certification	Certified units/sales
Canada (Music Canada)	Platinum	100,000^{^}
France (SNEP)	Gold	100,000^{*}
Switzerland (IFPI Switzerland)	Gold	20,000^{^}
United States (RIAA)	Platinum	500,000^{^}
^{*} Sales figures based on certification alone.^{^} Shipments figures based on certification alone.
