= Chapter V: Underrated =

Studio album by Syleena Johnson
- Released: September 27, 2011
- Length: 42:53
- Label: Shanachie
- Producers: Syleena Johnson (exec.); Johnny Danger; Chris "Big Dog" Davis; Rich Dicicco; Byron Dorris; JK; Mave; Earl Powell; Toxic; Unik

Syleena Johnson chronology
Chapter 4: Labor Pains (2008)	Chapter V: Underrated (2011)	Chapter 6: Couples Therapy (2014)

Singles from Chapter 5: Underrated
- 1. "A Boss" Released: June 21, 2011

Chapter V: Underrated is the fifth studio album by American singer Syleena Johnson. It was released by Shanachie Records on September 27, 2011 in the United States. Her debut with the label, the album peaked at number 49 on the US Top R&B/Hip-Hop Albums chart. The album's lead single, "A Boss," was released on iTunes on June 21, 2011.

== Critical reception ==
Professional ratings
Review scores
Source	Rating
About.com	4/5 stars
AllMusic	4/5 stars

AllMusic editor Jonathan Widran found that the focus on Chapter V: Underrated was "blissfully more on compelling, groove-oriented songwriting and Johnson's powerful, emotional vocals than star-studded invites. She asserts her ability to get back on her feet on the brief horn-fired title track intro, then engages in a sassy, En Vogue-like exchange about seeking an equal mate on the funked-up "A Boss." Johnson continues the assertive tone on the upbeat and catchy "Label Me", blending danceable rhythms with her characteristic ballad style. While often considered an underrated artist, this album finds her at a vocal and creative peak."

== Track listing ==
No.	Title	Producer(s)	Length
1.	"Underrated" (featuring AK of Do or Die)	Toxic; Johnny Danger	2:28
2.	"A Boss"	Nikolaos "Unik" Giannulidis	3:56
3.	"Fade Away"	Mave; Toxic	3:48
4.	"Angry Girl" (featuring Tweet)	Toxic; Byron Dorris; Earl Powell	4:08
5.	"Like Thorns"	Toxic; Dorris; Powell	3:34
6.	"Little Things" (featuring Malone)	Chris "Big Dog" Davis	3:43
7.	"My Shoes"	Toxic; Sureknock Jones	3:19
8.	"Label Me"	JK; Rich Dicicco	3:14
9.	"Go Head" (featuring 3D Na'Tee)	Toxic; Johnny Danger	3:32
10.	"Bad Person"	Mave; Toxic	3:31
11.	"The Champ"	Toxic; Dorris; Powell	3:49
12.	"Stone Wall"	Mave; Toxic	3:58
Total length:			42:53

== Charts ==
Chart (2011)	Peak position
US Top R&B/Hip-Hop Albums (Billboard)	49

== Release history ==
Chapter V: Underrated release history
Region	Date	Format	Label	Ref(s)
Various	September 27, 2011	CD; digital download	Shanachie	
