= Purity (ASAP Rocky song) =

Song by ASAP Rocky featuring Frank Ocean

from the album Testing
- Released: May 25, 2018
- Recorded: 2018
- Genre: R&B
- Length: 3:59
- Label: ASAP; Polo Grounds; RCA
- Songwriters: Rakim Mayers; Christopher Breaux; Lauryn Hill
- Producers: Dean Blunt; Finatik N Zac; Hector Delgado; ASAP Rocky

"Purity" is a song by American rapper ASAP Rocky, featuring vocals from American artist Frank Ocean. Produced by Hector Delgado, FnZ, Dean Blunt and A$AP Rocky, it appears as the final track on Rocky's third studio album, Testing (2018). The song prominently samples "I Gotta Find Peace of Mind" by Lauryn Hill, from her 2002 live album MTV Unplugged No. 2.0. Critics praised the track for its emotional vulnerability, lyrical introspection, and the collaborative dynamic between Rocky and Ocean.

== Background and composition ==
"Purity" was produced by Dean Blunt, Finatik N Zac, Hector Delgado, and A$AP Rocky. The contribution of UK experimental musician Dean Blunt was noted by Dazed Digital as part of Rocky's effort to merge mainstream and underground aesthetics.

The song samples the acoustic performance of "I Gotta Find Peace of Mind" by Lauryn Hill, which forms the instrumental and thematic backbone of the track. The song has been discussed as part of a wider trend of artists sampling Lauryn Hill's work in 2018, alongside Drake and Cardi B. Billboard noted this movement as part of Hill's renewed visibility in contemporary hip hop and R&B. Frank Ocean recorded his verse by improvising over the sample looped in the studio, according to a 2019 interview.

The lyrics address themes of fame, disillusionment, and loss. Rocky discusses strained family ties and the death of A$AP Mob member A$AP Press. Rocky described the track as an effort to be more emotionally honest with his audience, stating, "I want to be genuine, I want to be real... As opposed to just being braggadocious all the time." In another interview, he said the song was inspired by "losing people", including family and friends.

== Critical reception ==
"Purity" was highlighted by critics as a standout on Testing. Pitchfork named it a Best New Track, calling it a "heartfelt and introspective" finale that allowed Rocky to "transcend his reputation". The FADER referred to it as "vulnerable, soft, and easily the best track off Testing".

In a track-by-track review for The Independent, the song was described as "soulful and experimental," with the Lauryn Hill sample contributing to its emotional resonance. A Billboard article praised the track for offering "substance over style", noting Rocky's lyrical transparency about family and loss.

Esquire also featured "Purity" on its year-end list of best songs, describing it as a track that "takes cues from Ocean's masterpiece" and lauds its meditative tone.

== Certifications ==
Certifications for "Purity"
Region	Certification	Certified units/sales
New Zealand (RMNZ)	Gold	15,000^{‡}
United States (RIAA)	Gold	500,000^{‡}
^{‡} Sales+streaming figures based on certification alone.
