= Tonight I'm Gonna Let Go =

Single by Syleena Johnson

from the album Chapter 2: The Voice
- Released: August 5, 2002
- Length: 3:54
- Label: Jive
- Songwriters: Syleena Johnson; Mike Dunn; James Seals
- Producer: Mike Dunn

Syleena Johnson singles chronology
"Baby I'm So Confused" (2002)	"Tonight I'm Gonna Let Go" (2002)	"Guess What" (2002)

"Tonight I'm Gonna Let Go" is a song by American singer Syleena Johnson. It was written by Johnson, Mike Dunn, and James Seals for her second studio album Chapter 2: The Voice (2002), while production was helmed by Dunn. The song was released as the album's lead single in 2002 and became a top 40 hit in United Kingdom. The song song interpolates "Sweet Green Fields" by Seals and Crofts and also interpolates Put Your Hands Where My Eyes Could See by Busta Rhymes, which samples the Seals and Crofts song. The remix directly samples "Put Your Hands Where My Eyes Could See", where the Seals and Croft sample is already embedded.

== Music video ==
A music video for the R. Kelly-produced Remix of "Tonight I'm Gonna Let Go" was directed by filmmaker Nzingha Stewart. It features appearances Busta Rhymes and fellow Flipmode Squad members Sham, Rampage, and Spliff Star.

== Track listing ==
Enhanced CD single
No.	Title	Producer(s)	Length
1.	"Tonight I'm Gonna Let Go" (The Remix) (featuring Sham, Busta Rhymes, Rampage & Spliff Star)	Dunn; R. Kelly^{[a]}	4:27
2.	"Tonight I'm Gonna Let Go" (Main Mix) (featuring Sham, Busta Rhymes, Rampage & Spliff Star)	Dunn; Scorpio^{[a]}	4:43
3.	"Tonight I'm Gonna Let Go" (Urban A/C Main Mix)	Dunn	3:55
4.	"Tonight I'm Gonna Let Go" (The Remix Instrumental)	Dunn; R. Kelly^{[a]}	4:22
5.	"Tonight I'm Gonna Let Go" (Video)		4:05

Notes

- ^{^[a]} denotes remix producer

== Credits and personnel ==
Credits adapted from the Chapter 2: The Voice liner notes.

- Mike Dunn – producer, writer
- Syleena Johnson – writer, vocals
- James Seals – writer
- Brian Stanley – recording engineer
- Chris Trevett – recording engineer

== Charts ==
Chart (2002)	Peak position
UK Singles (OCC)	38
UK Hip Hop/R&B (OCC)	8
UK Indie (OCC)	4
US Hot R&B/Hip-Hop Songs (Billboard)	53

=== Year-end charts ===
Chart (2002)	Position
UK Urban (Music Week)	21

== Release history ==
Release dates and formats for "Tonight I'm Gonna Let Go"
Region	Date	Format	Label	Ref
Various	August 5, 2002	Rhythmic contemporary radio	Jive	
