= Rebirth of Soul =

Syleena Johnson album

Studio album by Syleena Johnson
- Released: November 10, 2017
- Genres: R&B; soul
- Length: 36:39
- Label: Shanachie
- Producer: Syl Johnson

Syleena Johnson chronology
Chapter 6: Couples Therapy (2014)	Rebirth of Soul (2017)	Woman (2020)

Rebirth of Soul is the seventh studio album by American recording artist Syleena Johnson. It was released by Shanachie Records on November 10, 2017 in the United States. Produced by Johnson's father Syl Johnson, who chose its songs and assembled a group of crack session players from the 1960s and 1970s, Rebirth of Soul is a cover album that comprises songs R&B, soul and rock songs of these eras.

== Track listing ==
No.	Title	Writer(s)	Length
1.	"Make Me Yours"	Bettye Swann	3:11
2.	"There'll Come a Time"	Eugene Record; Floyd Smith	4:08
3.	"We Did It"	John Moore	3:03
4.	"The Makings of You"	Curtis Mayfield	4:10
5.	"Is It Because I'm Black?"	Syl Johnson; Jimmy Jones; Glenn Watts	4:55
6.	"I'd Rather Go Blind"	Billy Foster; Ellington Jordan	4:32
7.	"Chain of Fools"	Don Covay	3:17
8.	"These Arms of Mine"	Otis Redding	3:57
9.	"Lonely Teardrops"	Tyran Carlo; Gwendolyn Gordy; Berry Gordy, Jr.	2:53
10.	"The Monkey Time"	Curtis Mayfield	3:11
Total length:			36:39

== Charts ==
Chart (2017)	Peak position
US R&B/Hip-Hop Album Sales (Billboard)	35
