= I Gotta Find Peace of Mind =

Song by Lauryn Hill

from the album MTV Unplugged No. 2.0
- Released: May 7, 2002
- Recorded: July 21, 2001
- Venue: MTV Studios, Times Square, New York City
- Genre: Folk
- Length: 9:21
- Label: Columbia
- Songwriter(s): Lauryn Hill
- Producer(s): Alex Coletti

"I Gotta Find Peace of Mind" is a song performed live by American singer and rapper Lauryn Hill, released in 2002 as part of her live album MTV Unplugged No. 2.0. Delivered solo with an acoustic guitar as part of her MTV Unplugged set, the nine-minute track incorporates elements of folk and soul and explores themes of spiritual reflection, emotional fatigue, and the pursuit of clarity. The performance gradually escalates in intensity, culminating in an emotional moment during which Hill cries on stage.

Critics described "I Gotta Find Peace of Mind" as introspective, noting its emotional delivery. The track has appeared in curated playlists related to mental health and personal healing, and has been referenced by artists and scholars for its approach to vulnerability and its deviation from conventional performance norms. In 2018, elements of the song were sampled in A$AP Rocky's "Purity", featuring Frank Ocean.

== Background and composition ==
"I Gotta Find Peace of Mind" appears as track 13 on the live album MTV Unplugged No. 2.0, Hill's first major musical release following her debut The Miseducation of Lauryn Hill. The performance was recorded live on July 21, 2001, as part of the television series MTV Unplugged, which featured artists performing stripped-down acoustic sets. Unlike most previous Unplugged performers, Hill appeared alone on stage, accompanying herself with only an acoustic guitar and foregoing her earlier material entirely.

Lyrically, the song explores themes of spiritual surrender and emotional exhaustion. Hill moves from pain and vulnerability—expressing feelings of insecurity, loss of identity, and emotional entrapment—to a sense of liberation and inner peace. By the end of the track, she makes references to spiritual peace, declaring "He's my peace of mind" while praising God as she cries, a moment that has been cited in reviews and scholarly analysis for its vulnerability and resistance to industry norms. According to Newsweek, the performance conveyed such authenticity that it felt "as if Hill is writing it on the spot". The song closes with a plea to "free your mind".

== Reception ==
Upon its release, MTV Unplugged No. 2.0 received a sharply divided response from critics, but "I Gotta Find Peace of Mind" was frequently cited as a standout from the album. TIME described the track as a defining moment of the performance, commenting "At the end of the first disc, on the standout 'I Gotta Find Peace of Mind,' she sings, 'Please don’t be mad with me, I have no identity / All that I've known is gone, all I was building on.' Then she breaks down in tears". Billboard referred to the song as one of the album's "golden nuggets", while The Washington Post called the nine-minute track a "cathartic plea for spiritual calm", and noted Hill's emotional delivery.

In later years, Stereogum referred to it as "the most emblematic song" on the album, noting its extended length and Hill's emotional depth. Complex noted that the album and the song embraced imperfection, writing: "every crease, every wrinkle and every blemish is not only plainly visible, but asking to be celebrated".

== Legacy and cultural impact ==
"I Gotta Find Peace of Mind" has often been cited in discussions of self-love in mental health–focused articles. In an interview, Nigerian singer Tems cited "I Gotta Find Peace of Mind" as a major inspiration in her youth, describing it as deeply spiritual and saying she could "feel the energy on it." In an interview, she said the song influenced her interest in creating music that she described as a "release" and reflective of her spirit.

In 2018, rapper A$AP Rocky sampled "I Gotta Find Peace of Mind" for the final track "Purity" on his album Testing, featuring Frank Ocean. Pitchfork described the track as "an ethereal backdrop" and placed it within a wider trend of artists sampling Hill that year. British singer Jorja Smith included "I Gotta Find Peace of Mind" on a list of songs that inspired her to pursue music. Doechii described the song as one that "blew her mind" as a teenager, adding that she often revisits it.

The song has been included on playlists curated by around themes of Black liberation, inner peace, and cultural influence by artists such as Dej Loaf and Lecrae, Rapsody, and actress Andra Day, as well as on Pandora's The Black Panthers: Vanguard of the Revolution inspired playlist. It has also been cited by ballerina Misty Copeland as a personal favorite, and by Texas Longhorns basketball player Tre Johnson as his pregame song of choice. Actor Michael K. Williams included the track in his character preparation playlists for The Wire, where he portrayed Omar Little. Actress Cristin Milioti described the performance as "a masterpiece" and praised Hill's vulnerability in front of a live audience, stating "Just a brilliant woman and her guitar, alone on stage, working through it".

== Academic analysis ==
In his 2021 book How to Go Mad Without Losing Your Mind: Madness and Black Radical Creativity, scholar La Marr Jurelle Bruce describes "I Gotta Find Peace of Mind" as a "nine-minute testimony of a woman rebuking an emotional abuser, vanquishing self-doubt", which Bruce characterized as a moment of emotional clarity and an example of radical truth-telling. In a 2022 essay for America, theologian David Meconi interpreted Hill's performance in "Peace of Mind" as a prophetic act, comparing her to biblical figures like Isaiah and John the Baptist. He wrote that Hill "brings whoever is willing to listen through a journey toward the ultimate answer to our mental and spiritual slavery", and cited her weeping in the song as a moment of divine vulnerability and clarity.

Similarly, a 2023 academic analysis from the University of Texas describes the song as a departure from Hill's public image after the release of The Miseducation of Lauryn Hill. The performance was interpreted as a rejection of the "genius" and "prophet" archetypes.
