= Chapter 3: The Flesh =

Studio album by Syleena Johnson
- Released: September 13, 2005
- Length: 61:39
- Label: Jive
- Producer: Various: R. Kelly; Kanye West; Jermaine Dupri; Manuel Seal, Jr.; KayGee; Terence "Tramp-Baby" Abney; Soul Diggaz; Marcellus "Handz Down" Dawson; Daniel Jackson; Duane Covert; Kevin Cannon; Terry Hunter; Darren Henson; Keith Pelzer; Magic; Mr. Saga; Kevin Randolph; Larry "Rock" Campbell; Rick Robinson; Tramp; Trend Setters

Syleena Johnson chronology
Chapter 2: The Voice (2002)	Chapter 3: The Flesh (2005)	Chapter 4: Labor Pains (2008)

Singles from Chapter 3: The Flesh
- 1. "Hypnotic" Released: April 5, 2005; 2. "Another Relationship" Released: July 26, 2005

Chapter 3: The Flesh is the third studio album by American singer Syleena Johnson. It was released by Jive Records on September 13, 2005 in the United States. The album spawned the singles "Hypnotic", which reached number 81 on the Hot R&B/Hip-Hop Songs, and "Another Relationship".

== Critical reception ==
Professional ratings
Review scores
Source	Rating
AllMusic	3/5 stars
The Guardian	2/5 stars
Vibe	4/5 stars

Allmusic found that Chapter 3: The Flesh "shows off more of Johnson's emotive, raspy-voiced style. From the provocative cover image to the album's song titles ("Special Occasion", "Phone Sex"), the subject matter of The Flesh is clear, yet it is Johnson's deeply bluesy, gospel-inflected delivery and the passionate conviction of her performances that make a lasting impression. Like Johnson's previous efforts, Chapter 3 bridges old-school soul of the '60s and '70s with an urban contemporary, hip-hop-inflected sound, and the results satisfy on both counts." Less impressed, David Peschek from The Guardian the album was moving Johnson "gradually further away from crafting her own classic. Her debut was an intermittently great wallow in the pain of a break-up; her voice a strikingly individual, deep and garnet-hued thing. But that individuality has drained away, leaving the bedroom soul of this third record cooing and woo-wooing with generic blankness."

== Track listing ==
No.	Title	Writer(s)	Producer(s)	Length
1.	"The Flesh — Interlude"	Syleena Johnson; Duane Covert	Daniel Jackson; Covert; Kevin Cannon	2:33
2.	"Hypnotic" (featuring R. Kelly & Fabolous)	Robert Kelly; John Jackson	R. Kelly	4:49
3.	"He Makes Me Say"	Johnson; Hunter; Natalie Cole	Terry Hunter	3:22
4.	"Special Occasion"	Kelly	R. Kelly	4:03
5.	"More" (featuring Anthony Hamilton)	Johnson; Kier Gist; Harold Lilly; Hamilton; Chris Lighty; Mary Brown; D. Hall	KayGee	3:54
6.	"Bull's-Eye (Suddenly)" (featuring Common)	Johnson; West; L. Lyle; Bobby Eli; Vinnie Barrett	Kanye West	4:18
7.	"Classic Love Song" (featuring Jermaine Dupri)	Johnson; Dupri; Seal; Edward Bivins	Jermaine Dupri; Manuel Seal, Jr.^{[a]}	3:23
8.	"Phone Sex" (featuring Twista)	Johnson; Henson; Pelzer; Carl Mitchell	Darren Henson; Keith Pelzer	5:01
9.	"Slowly"	Johnson; Henson; Pelzer	Henson; Pelzer	4:23
10.	"Time"	Johnson; LaShaun Owens; Karriem Mack; Maurice Redmond; Teena Marie	Soul Diggaz; Magic^{[a]}; Mr. Saga^{[a]}	3:35
11.	"Still Open"	Johnson; Henson; Pelzer	Henson; Pelzer	4:32
12.	"Another Relationship"	Johnson; Randolph; Agape Jerry; Ethan Farmer	Kevin Randolph; Larry "Rock" Campbell	4:16
13.	"Leave Me Alone"	Johnson; Robinson	Rick Robinson	3:35
14.	"Apartment for Rent"	Johnson; Gist; Abney; Johnny Bristol; Robert Torres	KayGee; Tramp^{[a]}; Trend Setters^{[a]}	3:52
15.	"Only a Woman"	Johnson; Gist; Abney	KayGee	3:52
16.	"The Flesh — Outro"	Johnson; Covert	KayGee	1:23

Notes

- ^{^[a]} signifies a co-producer

== Charts ==
Chart (2005)	Peak position
US Billboard 200	75
US Top R&B/Hip-Hop Albums (Billboard)	15
