= Chapter 6: Couples Therapy =

Studio album by Syleena Johnson
- Released: October 27, 2014
- Genres: R&B; soul; neo soul
- Length: 56:38
- Labels: Blakbyrd; eOne

Syleena Johnson chronology
| Chapter 5: Underrated (2011) | Chapter 6: Couples Therapy (2014) | Rebirth of Soul (2017) |

Chapter 6: Couples Therapy is the sixth studio album by American recording artist Syleena Johnson, released by Blakbyrd and eOne Music.

== Critical reception ==
Professional ratings
Review scores
| Source | Rating |
|---|---|
| Allmusic | 3.5/5 stars |
| Parlé | 4/5 stars |

AllMusic editor Andy Kellman found that while Chapter 6: Couples Therapy "doesn't have the most appealing title, it reflects what Johnson has been through and covers a broader spectrum of emotions than indicated [...] There are many moods between [the] highlights, and they're all revealed with the same high level of conviction heard in Johnson's previous output [...] This is yet another pleasing, down-to-earth addition to one of the steadiest R&B discographies of the 2000s and 2010s."

== Track listing ==
| No. | Title | Writer(s) | Length |
|---|---|---|---|
| 1. | "All This Way for Love" | Kriss Johnson; Syleena Johnson | 3:55 |
| 2. | "Fool's Gold" (featuring Leela James) | Pierre Medor; S. Johnson | 3:18 |
| 3. | "Heaven in Hell" | Medor; S. Johnson; Ursula Yancy; Lamar Chase; Tyrrell Bing | 3:18 |
| 4. | "My Love" | Medor; S. Johnson; Chase; Bing | 3:58 |
| 5. | "If I Was Your World" | K. Johnson; S. Johnson; Tiffany Jainen; Andre Henry | 3:57 |
| 6. | "Harmony" (featuring Dave Hollister) | Medor; S. Johnson; Chase; Bing | 3:48 |
| 7. | "No Beginner" (featuring Willie Taylor) | K. Johnson; S. Johnson | 4:27 |
| 8. | "Boom" | K. Johnson; S. Johnson | 3:57 |
| 9. | "If You Need to Know" | K. Johnson; S. Johnson; Henry | 3:55 |
| 10. | "Perfectly Worthless" | Medor; S. Johnson; Chase; Bing | 3:54 |
| 11. | "Silence" | K. Johnson; S. Johnson; Henry | 5:07 |
| 12. | "Unstoppable" | Medor; S. Johnson | 3:39 |
| 13. | "I Cut My Hair" | S. Johnson | 5:28 |
| Total length: | | | 56:38 |

== Charts ==
| Chart (2014) | Peak position |
|---|---|
| US Billboard 200 | 197 |
| US Independent Albums (Billboard) | 38 |
| US Top R&B/Hip-Hop Albums (Billboard) | 29 |
