= Chapter 4: Labor Pains =

Studio album by Syleena Johnson
- Released: December 23, 2008 (Digital); January 13, 2009 (Official)
- Length: 62:22
- Label: Aneelys
- Producers: Donald Alford; Steven Dukes; Darren "Limitless" Henson; DeMone Hobbs; C.J. Johnson; Nate Q; Jason Orr; Keith Pelzer; Redstorm; Toxic

Syleena Johnson chronology
Chapter 3: The Flesh (2005)	Chapter 4: Labor Pains (2008)	Chapter 5: Underrated (2011)

Singles from Chapter 4: Labor Pains
- 1. "It Is True" Released: June 24, 2008

Chapter 4: Labor Pains is the fourth studio album by American singer Syleena Johnson. It was released digitally on December 23, 2008, and physically on January 13, 2009, on Johnson's own label, Aneelys Entertainment, after her departure from longtime record company Jive Records. Distribution was handled by Universal Music Group and Federal Distribution. Upon its release, Chapter 4 entered the US Billboard Top R&B/Hip-Hop Albums chart at number forty-two. Chapter 4's lead single was "It Is True", which was made available on iTunes on June 24, 2008, and impacted radio on July 1.

== Critical reception ==
Professional ratings
Review scores
Source	Rating
About.com	3.5/5 stars
AllMusic	3.5/5 stars

AllMusic editor James Steiner found that Chapter 4: Labor Pains was "Johnson's first attempt to grapple with the towering legacy of her father, Syl Johnson. While Syleena's previous albums featured smartly produced, forward-looking R&B, the retro flourishes of Chapter 4's "Shoo Fly," with its slow burning wah wah guitar, and Syleena's incredible interpretation of her father's gut-wrenching signature hit "Is It Because I'm Black," mark a fascinating and rewarding change of direction for this talented singer." Mark Edward Nero of About.com awarded Chapter 4: Labor Pains three-and-a-half out of five stars, praising Johnson's "strong, soulful" vocal performances and the album's exploration of love, life, and relationships. While he felt the album lost momentum toward the end, Nero concluded that it was "a strong album worth hearing" and a clear "labor of love" for the singer.

== Track listing ==
No.	Title	Writer(s)	Producer(s)	Length
1.	"Intro"	Syleena Johnson; K. Garris; DeMone Hobbs; C.J. Johnson; Jason Orr	C.J. Johnson; Hobbs; Orr	1:35
2.	"Labor Pains"	Syleena Johnson; Hobbs; C.J. Johnson; Orr	C.J. Johnson; Hobbs; Orr	4:11
3.	"Where's the Love" (featuring Teefa)	Syleena Johnson; Lateefa Harland; Hobbs; C.J. Johnson; Orr	C.J. Johnson; Hobbs; Orr	4:10
4.	"Freedom"	Syleena Johnson; Byron Bowies; William Keyes; Syleecia Thompson	Frederick "Toxic" Taylor	4:49
5.	"Is It Because I'm Black"	Syl Johnson; James L. Jones; Glenn Watts	Nate Q	4:57
6.	"Be Me"	Syleena Johnson; Taylor	Toxic; Donald Alford	4:26
7.	"Interlude: Redstorm's Domestic Lesson"	Syleena Johnson; Redstorm	Redstorm	2:15
8.	"You Let Me Down"	Syleena Johnson; Taylor	Toxic; Steven Dukes	4:09
9.	"Shoo Fly"	Syleena Johnson; Hobbs; C.J. Johnson; Orr	C.J. Johnson; Hobbs; Orr	4:19
10.	"Maury Povich" (featuring Cold Hard)	Syleena Johnson; Corey Johnson; Taylor	Toxic	4:15
11.	"It Is True"	Syleena Johnson; Taylor; Curtis Mayfield	Toxic; Anthony Burg^{[a]}	3:45
12.	"Your Love"	Syleena Johnson; Hobbs; C.J. Johnson; Orr	C.J. Johnson; Hobbs; Orr	4:15
13.	"My First"	Syleena Johnson; Hobbs; C.J. Johnson; Orr	C.J. Johnson; Hobbs; Orr	3:53
14.	"Personal Trainer"	Syleena Johnson; Darren "Limitless" Henson; Keith Pelzer	Henson; Pelzer	3:50
15.	"Go Home"	Syleena Johnson; Taylor	Toxic; Dukes	4:14
16.	"Go"	Syleena Johnson; Taylor	Toxic	3:16
17.	"Outro"	Syleena Johnson; Garris; Hobbs; C.J. Johnson; Orr	C.J. Johnson; Hobbs; Orr	1:04
Total length:				62:22

Notes

- ^{^[a]} denotes additional producer

Sample credits

- "Freedom" contains a sample of "Talkin Bout Freedom" as performed by Syl Johnson.
- "Is It Because I'm Black" contains a sample of the same-titled song as performed by Syl Johnson.
- "It Is True" contains elements of "Sparkle" as performed by Aretha Franklin.

== Personnel ==
Credits adapted from the liner notes of Chapter 4: Labor Pains.

- flytedesign – art direction
- Syleena Johnson – A&R
- Steven Ledell – photography
- Slavic Livins – engineer, mixing, recording
- Herb Powers – mastering
- Chris Steinmetz – mixing
- Frederick "Toxic" Taylor – engineer, recording
- Syleecia Thompson – A&R

== Charts ==
Chart (2009)	Peak position
US Top R&B/Hip-Hop Albums (Billboard)	42

== Release history ==
Chapter 4: Labor Pains release history
Region	Date	Format	Label	Ref(s)
United States	December 23, 2008	Digital download	Aneelys	
United States	January 13, 2009	CD	Aneelys	
