= Joel Kipnis =

American musician

Joel Kipnis is a producer, writer, soul/R&B guitarist and owner of New York City recording studio, Pulse, Joel has written and produced records with Herbie Hancock, John Forte (Fugees producer), Soul II Soul, The Temptations, Jennifer Love Hewitt, Syleena Johnson, Pete Belasco and others.
