= Syleena Johnson =

American singer-songwriter (born 1976)

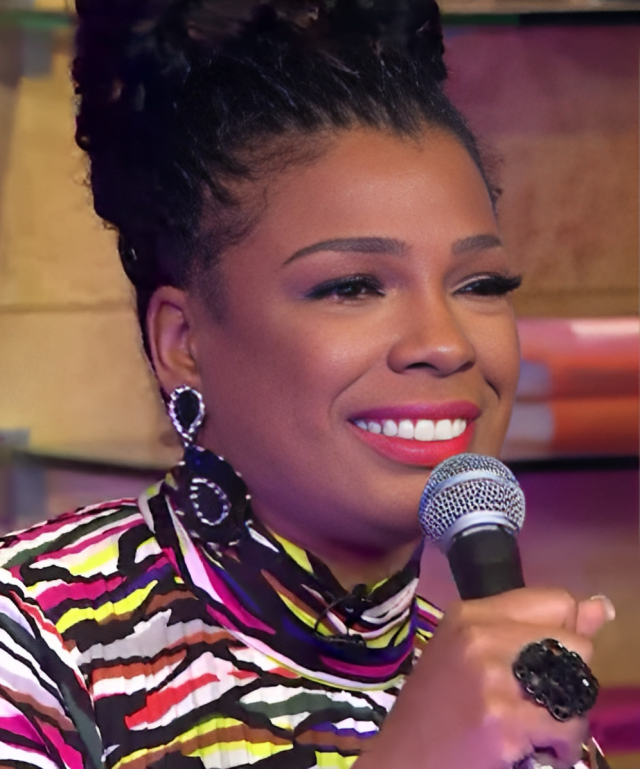
- Johnson in 2020

Background information
- Born: Syleena Thompson; September 2, 1976 (age 50); Harvey, Illinois, U.S.
- Origin: Chicago, Illinois, U.S.
- Genres: R&B; soul
- Occupations: Singer-songwriter; actress; television personality
- Years active: 2001–present
- Labels: Shanachie; E1; Aneelys; Blackbyrd; Jive
- Spouses: Marcus Betts (m. 2000, divorced); Kiwane Garris (m. 2007)
- Website: www.syleenamusic.com

Syleena Johnson (née Thompson; born September 2, 1976) is an American R&B and soul singer-songwriter and actress. She is best known for her guest appearance on Kanye West's 2004 single "All Falls Down", which peaked at number seven on the Billboard Hot 100. She signed with Jive Records to release three albums: Chapter 1: Love, Pain & Forgiveness (2001), Chapter 2: The Voice (2002), and Chapter 3: The Flesh (2005), each of which received critical acclaim and modest commercial reception. She returned to work with West for his tenth album, Donda (2021), where she performed on the spoken-word song "Donda Chant".

== Early life ==
Johnson, born on September 2, 1976, is the daughter of R&B Hi Records singer Syl Johnson (1936–2022) and Brenda Thompson, who was the first black female police commissioner of Harvey, Illinois. Johnson has two older sisters, Syleecia and Sylette.

== Music career ==
In 1998, Johnson released her demo, Love Hangover, and her debut studio album, Chapter 1: Love, Pain, and Forgiveness, in 2001. Her debut single, "I Am Your Woman", co-written by American former singer-songwriter R. Kelly, charted at number 43 on Billboard's Hot R&B/Hip-Hop Songs chart.

In 2004, Johnson was featured as a vocalist on Kanye West's single "All Falls Down", from his debut album, The College Dropout, after West was unable to use the original sample recorded by Lauryn Hill during her 2002 MTV unplugged performance. A year later, she guest appeared on Cuban Link's album Chain Reaction, on the track "Life Goes On".

In 2005, Johnson released her third album Chapter 3: The Flesh, which became her highest-charting album on Billboard. Chapter 4: Labor Pains was released on January 13, 2009. In 2009, Johnson appeared on a single with KRS-One, Twista and Crucial Conflict titled "Self Destruction". Johnson starred in TV One reality series R&B Divas: Atlanta from 2012 to 2014; lasting three seasons. As of 2012, she was managed by DYG Management. On September 23, 2013, Johnson and Musiq Soulchild released a duet album titled 9ine.

Johnson was featured on "Donda Chant", the opening track to Kanye West's tenth album Donda, released in August 2021.

== Personal life ==
In August 2000, Johnson married former Illinois State University college basketball player Marcus Betts. Betts graduated in December 2000 and became her manager for her first two albums.

On July 1, 2007, she married Kiwane Garris. Garris, a fellow Chicagoan, is a worldwide journeyman basketball player, having played for various NBA and EuroLeague teams. On August 1, 2007, after forty-eight hours of labor, their son Kiwane Garris Jr. was born. On February 6, 2011, she gave birth to their second son Kingston.

Johnson is a member of Zeta Phi Beta sorority. In June 2015, Johnson graduated from Drake University, where she received her bachelor's degree in nutrition science, summa cum laude, 21 years after she enrolled. She was also inducted into the Alpha Beta Kappa honors society for her academic achievements.

== Discography ==
=== Studio albums ===
- Chapter 1: Love, Pain & Forgiveness (2001)
- Chapter 2: The Voice (2002)
- Chapter 3: The Flesh (2005)
- Chapter 4: Labor Pains (2009)
- Chapter 5: Underrated (2011)
- Chapter 6: Couples Therapy (2014)
- Rebirth of Soul (2017)
- Woman (2020)
- Legacy (2024)

== Awards and nominations ==
Year	Award
2001	Billboard Music Video Award nomination for Best Adult Contemporary New Artist Clip of the Year ("I Am Your Woman").
2004	BET Award nomination for Viewers Choice Award for "All Falls Down" (shared nomination with Kanye West).
2004	Vibe Award nomination for Reelest Video for "All Falls Down" (shared nomination with Kanye West).
2004	MTV Video Music Award nomination for Best Breakthrough Video for "All Falls Down" (shared nomination with Kanye West).
2004	MTV Video Music Award nomination for Best Male Video for "All Falls Down" (shared nomination with Kanye West).
2004	MTV Video Music Award nomination for Best New Artist for "All Falls Down" (shared nomination with Kanye West).
2004	MTV Video Music Award nomination for Best Hip-Hop Video for "All Falls Down" (shared nomination with Kanye West).
2005	Grammy Award nomination for Best Rap/Sung Collaboration for "All Falls Down"
2005	Chicago Music Award win for Best Female Vocalist
2005	Truth Award win for Top Single for "Hypnotic"
2022	Grammy Award nomination for Album of the Year (Donda)
