= The Prerequisite =

Demo recordings by Kanye West

- Unofficial cover art commonly associated with the demo recordings.

Demo album by Kanye West
- Released: 2001 (private distribution); April 20, 2013 (surfaced online)
- Recorded: 2000–2001
- Genre: Hip-hop
- Length: 47:40
- Label: Roc-A-Fella
- Producer: Kanye West

Kanye West chronology
The Prerequisite (2001)	Get Well Soon (2002)

The Prerequisite is the commonly used name for a collection of demo recordings created by American rapper Kanye West, distributed privately to record labels and industry insiders in 2001. The full set of recordings surfaced online on April 20, 2013. The demo album contains songs like "Home (Windy)" and "Jesus Walks" that were reworked and released on future albums, such as Graduation and The College Dropout, with instrumentals from other tracks being given to artists such as Common.

== Background ==
Unlike West's other mixtapes, The Prerequisite contains mostly original songs as he performs in each track of the mixtape.

The most notable tracks are "Jesus Walks" and "Dream Come True" (later renamed "All Falls Down"), both of which released on West's debut studio album The College Dropout (2004); "Hey Mama", which released on West's second studio album, Late Registration (2005); and "Home (Windy)", which had its lyrics reused for "Homecoming" from West's third studio album, Graduation (2007). The track "Wow" was later referenced by West on The College Dropout's final track, "Last Call". Tracks that appear on later albums have varying levels of mixing changes, with "Dream Come True" having a direct sample of the song "Mystery of Iniquity" by Lauryn Hill, rather than an interpolation.

The mixtape surfaced online on April 20, 2013.

== Track listing ==
No.	Title	Length
1.	"Home (Windy)" (with John Legend)	2:52
2.	"Jesus Walks" (with Rhymefest)	2:19
3.	"Have It Your Way"	3:38
4.	"Out of Your Mind" (with John Legend)	3:25
5.	"Wow"	2:25
6.	"I Need to Know"	3:44
7.	"Gotta Pose" (snippet, with Solomon Burke)	1:26
8.	"Never Letting Go (The Stalker Song)"	4:01
9.	"Hey Mama"	4:24
10.	"Know the Game"	2:58
11.	"Family Business" (with Larry Wade and Terry Callier)	4:10
12.	"Dream Come True"	3:54
13.	"That Nigga Jigga" (with DJ Boom)	2:20
14.	"I Met Oprah"	2:45
15.	"Heartbeat" (instrumental)	3:19
Total length:		47:40

Notes

- John Legend is credited under his legal name, John Stephens, on "Home (Windy)" and "Out of Your Mind".
