= Kanye West albums discography =

Recording collections by American rapper

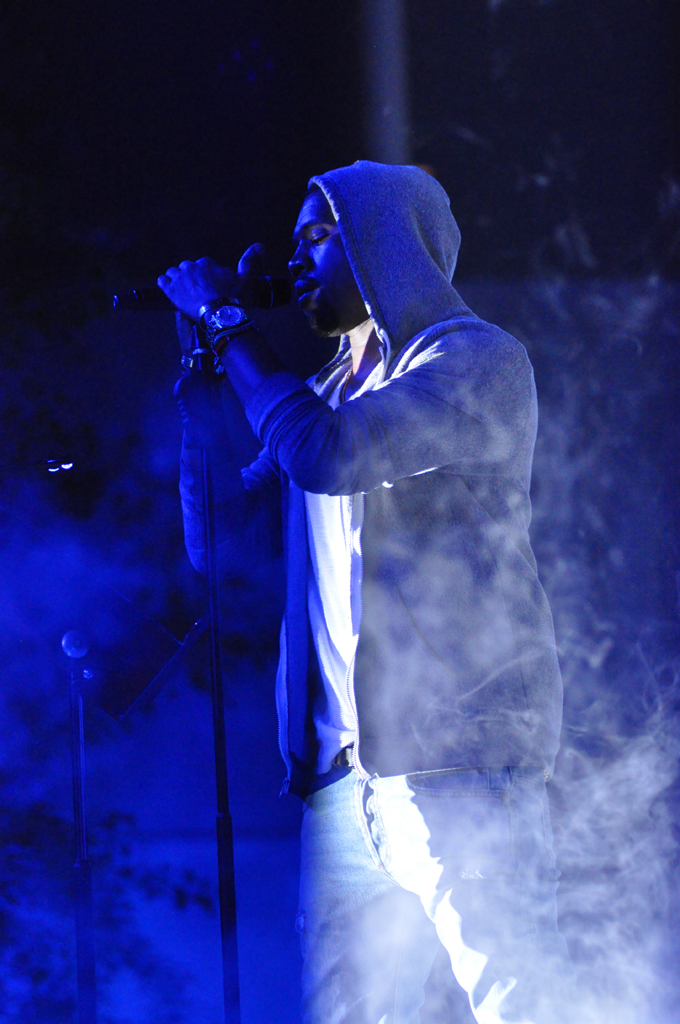
- West performing in 2011
- Studio albums: 12
- Mixtapes: 12
- Live albums: 2
- Compilation albums: 1
- Video albums: 1
- Collaborative albums: 4

American rapper, singer, songwriter, and record producer Kanye West has released twelve solo studio albums, four collaborative studio albums, one compilation album, two live albums, one video album, and twelve mixtapes. Ten of his studio albums have been certified at least platinum in the United States. As of July 2026, West has certified 37 million equivalent solo albums units in the United States, placing him amongst the highest-certified music artists in the United States.

West's debut studio album, The College Dropout (2004), debuted at number two on the US Billboard 200, and was certified double-platinum by the Recording Industry Association of America (RIAA) in June 2004. West's second studio album, Late Registration (2005), debuted at number one on the Billboard 200, with first-week sales of 860,000 copies. The album was the ninth best-selling album of 2005 in the United States. West's third studio album, Graduation (2007), debuted at number one on the Billboard 200, selling 957,000 units in its first week, becoming the fastest-selling album in the US since Late Registration, and breaking the record for most digital albums sold in a week. West's fourth studio album, 808s & Heartbreak (2008), became his third consecutive number one release on the Billboard 200.

West's fifth studio album, My Beautiful Dark Twisted Fantasy (2010), debuted at number one on the Billboard 200, with the fourth-highest digital first-week sales ever. Watch the Throne (2011), a collaborative album with fellow American rapper Jay-Z, broke the US iTunes first-week sales record. The compilation album, Cruel Summer (2012), released with his label GOOD Music, debuted atop the Top R&B/Hip-Hop Albums chart. West's sixth studio album, Yeezus (2013), debuted at number one in the United States, United Kingdom, Canada, Australia, and New Zealand.

West's seventh studio album, The Life of Pablo (2016), made history by becoming the first album to top the Billboard 200, predominantly from streaming, while also having the second-highest total of first-week streams for an album. In June 2018, West released both his eighth studio album, Ye (2018), and his second collaborative album, Kids See Ghosts (with Kid Cudi). His ninth studio album, Jesus Is King (2019), became West's first to top the Top Christian Albums, and Top Gospel Albums charts. His tenth studio album, Donda (2021), recorded the second-biggest first week performance in Spotify's history. Donda 2 (2022), his eleventh studio album, was released in February 2022 via the Stem Player. In February 2024, he released his third collaborative album Vultures 1 (2024) with Ty Dolla Sign, which became his 11th consecutive album to debut at number one on the Billboard 200, the most of any artist. In August 2024, he followed up with his fourth collaborative album Vultures 2 (2024), again collaborating with Ty Dolla Sign; the album debuted at two on the Billboard 200.

West’s twelfth studio album, Bully (2026), was announced in September 2024. Several work-in-progress versions, each featuring different tracklists, were released in March 2025. During its development, West rereleased Donda 2 to streaming services in April 2025, making it commercially available for the first time. Originally scheduled for mid-2025, Bully had faced several delays, before finally being released on March 28, 2026. Bully debuted at number two on the Billboard 200.

== Albums ==
=== Solo studio albums ===
List of studio albums, with selected chart positions, sales figures and certifications
Title	Details	Peak chart positions										Sales	Certifications
Title	Details	US	US R&B	US Rap	AUS	CAN	GER	IRL	NZ	SWI	UK	Sales	Certifications
The College Dropout	Released: February 10, 2004; Label: Roc-A-Fella, Def Jam; Formats: CD, LP, digital download, streaming	2	1	5	—	38	77	13	—	96	12	US: 3,358,000	RIAA: 6× Platinum; BPI: 3× Platinum; MC: Platinum; RMNZ: 2× Platinum; IFPI DEN: 2× Platinum
Late Registration	Released: August 30, 2005; Label: Roc-A-Fella, Def Jam; Formats: CD, LP, digital download, streaming	1	1	1	14	1	14	2	11	9	2	US: 3,100,000; UK: 846,000	RIAA: 5× Platinum; ARIA: Platinum; BPI: 3× Platinum; IRMA: 2× Platinum; MC: 2× Platinum; RMNZ: 3× Platinum; IFPI DEN: Platinum; RIAJ: Gold
Graduation	Released: September 11, 2007; Label: Roc-A-Fella, Def Jam; Formats: CD, digital download, streaming	1	1	1	2	1	10	2	2	3	1	US: 2,700,000	RIAA: 8× Platinum; ARIA: 3× Platinum; BPI: 3× Platinum; BVMI: Gold; IFPI SWI: Gold; IRMA: Platinum; MC: 2× Platinum; RMNZ: 5× Platinum; IFPI DEN: 4× Platinum; RIAJ: Gold; NFPF: Gold
808s & Heartbreak	Released: November 24, 2008; Label: Roc-A-Fella, Def Jam; Formats: CD, LP, digital download, streaming	1	1	—	12	4	30	11	15	13	11	US: 1,700,000	RIAA: 4× Platinum; ARIA: Gold; BPI: Platinum; IRMA: Platinum; MC: Platinum; RMNZ: 2× Platinum; IFPI DEN: Platinum
My Beautiful Dark Twisted Fantasy	Released: November 22, 2010; Label: Roc-A-Fella, Def Jam; Formats: CD, LP, digital download, streaming	1	1	1	6	1	19	18	10	10	16	US: 1,300,000	RIAA: 5× Platinum; ARIA: 2× Platinum; BPI: 2× Platinum; BVMI: Gold; RMNZ: 4× Platinum; IFPI DEN: 2× Platinum
Yeezus	Released: June 18, 2013; Label: Roc-A-Fella, Def Jam; Formats: CD, cassette, digital download, streaming	1	1	1	1	1	15	4	1	6	1	US: 750,000	RIAA: 3× Platinum; ARIA: Gold; BPI: Gold; RMNZ: 2× Platinum; IFPI DEN: Platinum
The Life of Pablo	Released: February 14, 2016; Label: GOOD, Def Jam; Formats: Digital download, streaming	1	1	1	65	6	—	8	—	—	30	US: 30,000	RIAA: 3× Platinum; ARIA: Platinum; BPI: Platinum; RMNZ: Gold; SNEP: Gold; IFPI DEN: 3× Platinum; MC: 2x Platinum
Ye	Released: June 1, 2018; Label: GOOD, Def Jam; Format: CD, LP, digital download, streaming	1	1	1	1	1	25	1	1	7	2	US: 156,000	RIAA: Platinum; BPI: Gold; RMNZ: Platinum; IFPI DEN: Gold
Jesus Is King	Released: October 25, 2019; Label: GOOD, Def Jam; Format: CD, LP, cassette, digital download, streaming	1	1	1	1	1	19	2	1	8	2	US: 109,000	RIAA: Platinum; BPI: Silver; RMNZ: Gold; IFPI DEN: Gold
Donda	Released: August 29, 2021; Label: GOOD, Def Jam; Format: CD, LP, digital download, streaming	1	1	1	1	1	1	1	1	1	1	US: 37,000	RIAA: Platinum; BPI: Gold; IFPI DEN: Platinum; MC: Platinum; RMNZ: Platinum
Donda 2	Released: February 23, 2022; Label: YZY; Format: Digital download, streaming, Stem Player	— (Note: "Donda 2" did not enter the Billboard 200, but peaked at number 30 on the Independent Albums Chart.)	—	—	—	—	—	—	—	72	— (Note: "Donda 2" did not enter the UK Albums Chart, but peaked at number 19 on the UK Album Downloads Chart.)		
Bully	Released: March 28, 2026; Label: YZY, Gamma; Format: CD, cassette, LP, digital download, streaming	2	1	1	3	2	9	3	3	3	3	KOR: 477; US: 56,000	
"—" denotes a recording that did not chart or was not released in that territory.

=== Collaborative studio albums ===
List of collaborative studio albums, with selected chart positions, sales figures and certifications
Title	Details	Peak chart positions										Sales	Certifications
Title	Details	US	US R&B	US Rap	AUS	CAN	GER	IRL	NZ	SWI	UK	Sales	Certifications
Watch the Throne (with Jay-Z)	Released: August 8, 2011; Label: Roc-A-Fella, Roc Nation, Def Jam; Formats: CD, LP, digital download, streaming	1	1	1	2	1	2	5	4	1	3	US: 1,432,000; WW: 2,000,000	RIAA: 5× Platinum; ARIA: Platinum; BPI: Platinum; RMNZ: 2× Platinum; IFPI DEN: 2× Platinum; MC: Platinum
Kids See Ghosts (with Kid Cudi as Kids See Ghosts)	Released: June 8, 2018; Label: Wicked Awesome, GOOD, Def Jam; Format: CD, LP, digital download, streaming	2	1	1	4	3	33	2	3	12	7	US: 101,000	RIAA: Gold; BPI: Silver; RMNZ: Gold
Vultures 1 (with Ty Dolla Sign as ¥$)	Released: February 10, 2024; Label: YZY; Format: CD, LP, digital download, streaming	1	1	1	1	1	1	2	1	1	2	US: 800,000	RIAA: Gold; BPI: Gold; IFPI DEN: Gold; RMNZ: Gold
Vultures 2 (with Ty Dolla Sign as ¥$)	Released: August 3, 2024; Label: YZY; Format: Digital download, streaming	2	1	1	4	1	8	6	3	2	7	US: 60,500	

=== Compilation albums ===
List of compilation albums, with selected chart positions, sales figures and certifications
Title	Details	Peak chart positions										Sales	Certifications
Title	Details	US	US R&B	AUS	CAN	DEN	NED	FRA	GER	SWI	UK	Sales	Certifications
Cruel Summer (as GOOD Music)	Released: September 14, 2012; Label: GOOD, Def Jam; Formats: CD, digital download, streaming	2	1	7	4	12	10	30	74	10	2	US: 1,000,000	RIAA: Platinum

=== Live albums ===
List of live albums, with selected chart positions and certifications
Title	Details	Peak chart positions		Certifications
Title	Details	IRL	UK	Certifications
Late Orchestration	Released: April 24, 2006; Label: Mercury; Formats: CD, LP, digital download, streaming	46	59	BPI: Gold
VH1 Storytellers	Released: January 5, 2010; Label: Roc-A-Fella, Def Jam; Formats: CD, DVD	—	—	
"—" denotes a recording that did not chart or was not released in that territory.

=== Video albums ===
List of video albums, with selected chart positions and certifications
Title	Details	Peak chart positions	Certifications
Title	Details	US Video	Certifications
The College Dropout Video Anthology	Released: March 22, 2005; Label: Roc-A-Fella, Def Jam; Formats: DVD	6	RIAA: Gold

== Mixtapes ==
List of mixtapes
Title	Details
Get Well Soon	Released: December 14, 2002; Label: Roc-A-Fella; Formats: CD
Akademiks: Jeanius Level Musik	Released: December 20, 2002; Label: Roc-A-Fella; Formats: CD
Behind the Beats (Hosted by Plain Pat and Ferris Bueller)	Released: 2003; Label: Self-released; Formats: CD
I'm Good...	Released: August 2003; Label: Roc-A-Fella; Formats: CD
Akademiks: Jeanius Level Musik Vol. 2	Released: October 23, 2003; Label: Roc-A-Fella; Formats: CD
Kon the Louis Vuitton Don	Released: January 24, 2004; Label: Self-released; Formats: CD
Kanye: The Essentials Collection (Note: Although people claim that this mixtape is a bootleg, West provides exclusive interludes, where he also confirms his involvement in the mixtape.) (Hosted by Mick Boogie)	Released: March 2004; Label: The League Crew; Formats: CD
Second Semester: Kanye Essentials 2 (Hosted by Mick Boogie)	Released: 2005; Label: Self-released; Formats: CD
Welcome to Kanye's Soul Mix Show (with A-Trak)	Released: September 5, 2006; Label: Tube; Formats: CD
Can't Tell Me Nothing	Released: May 27, 2007; Label: RGS; Formats: CD, digital download
The Graduate (Note: Although people claim that this mixtape is a bootleg, West promoted this mixtape on his own website.) (with Mick Boogie, Terry Urban, and 9th Wonder)	Released: October 18, 2007; Label: Self-released; Formats: Digital download
Sky High: A We Got the Remix Special Edition (with DJ Benzi and Plain Pat)	Released: November 20, 2008; Label: Self-released; Formats: Digital download

== See also ==
- Kanye West singles discography
- Kanye West production discography
