= Sun Coming Down =

Studio album by Ought
- Released: 18 September 2015
- Studio: Hotel2Tango
- Genre: Indie rock
- Length: 40:28
- Label: Constellation Records
- Producer: Radwan Ghazi Moumneh

Ought chronology
| More Than Any Other Day (2014) | Sun Coming Down (2015) | Room Inside the World (2018) |

Sun Coming Down is the second studio album by indie rock band Ought, released on 18 September 2015 by Constellation Records. The album was written and recorded over a two-month period in the Montreal studio Hotel2Tango and produced by Radwan Ghazi Moumneh. Upon release, Sun Coming Down received generally positive reviews from music critics, with praise directed to lead singer Tim Darcy's vocal delivery and the album's socially aware and emotionally sincere lyrics. Several critics named the album as one of the best of the year and its song Beautiful Blue Sky as one of the best of the decade.

== Background and recording ==
Sun Coming Down was conceived following touring for the band's previous album, More Than Any Other Day, released in 2014. The album was written and recorded over a two-month period in the Hotel2Tango studio in Montreal, and produced by Radwan Ghazi Moumneh, with the band's recording routine undertaken on a "strict schedule" in contrast to the recording process for its predecessor. Lead Tim Darcy stated the songs developed "in a vacuum" and without "pre-determination", mostly created in the studio during recording sessions, and developed collaboratively and with an openness to exploring the extremes of "loud and fast" and "quieter" directions for songs. Darcy stated that his speak-singing vocal delivery on the album was borne from losing his voice when yelling, and the delivery allowed him to more clearly enunciate his lyrics. The band trialled songs for the album in live shows from April 2015.

== Release and promotion ==
Sun Coming Down was announced by the band in July 2015, announcing a North American tour and releasing the songs Beautiful Blue Sky and Men for Miles. The album was made available for streaming on 11 September, and released on 18 September. A music video for the title track, Sun's Coming Down, directed by Aaliyeh Afshar and Max Taeuschel, was released on the same day. The band toured the album in North America over August to October 2015, including at the Pitchfork Music Festival in Chicago.

== Critical reception ==
Professional ratings
Aggregate scores
| Source | Rating |
|---|---|
| Metacritic | 80% |
Review scores
| Source | Rating |
| Consequence | B |
| Drowned in Sound | 8/10 |
| Mojo | 3/5 stars |
| MusicOMH | 5/5 stars |
| Pitchfork | 8.0 |
| Rolling Stone | 4/5 stars |
| SPIN | 8/10 |
| The Guardian | 4/5 stars |
| The Line of Best Fit | 8/10 |
| Uncut | 7/10 |

According to 'review aggregator Metacritic, Sun Coming Down received "generally favorable" reviews from critics, and named as an album of the week for SPIN and The Line of Best Fit. The publications PopMatters, The Skinny and Far Out stated that the album was one of the best of 2015.

Many critics praised the album's sound as an improvement over its predecessor, More Than Any Other Day. Guia Cortassa of The Quietus considered it to be a "natural continuation" and "valuable step forward" on its predecessor due to the album's "sharp and witty" lyrics and sincere focus on "the frantic bewilderment of solitude and despair of our times". Magic stated that the album was "more eclectic and experimental" than its predecessor. Similarly, Kevin Korber of PopMatters found the album to be "every bit as thrilling and refreshing" as the preceding album, featuring a "newfound abstractness" and tense performance. Tom Jowett of The Line of Best Fit highlighted the album's "terse guitar work", "laconic vocal delivery" and stylistic simplicity, considering the more minimal approach provided the band room to have "greater freedom and intensity" and an "inherent naturalism". Describing the band's music as "nervous, antsy, sometimes hostile, yet intoxicatingly vibrant" Stuart Berman of Pitchfork praised Sun Coming Down as a "more aggressive" and "cryptic" album. Rob Sheffield of Rolling Stone compared the album's "abrasive guitar" to Mission of Burma and Darcy's vocal delivery to The Fall assessing the band as writing "harsh songs for harsh times". Michael Hann of The Guardian found the album to have an "engrossing" sense of "relaxed intensity", stating "the songs ebb and flow, build and release, singer Tim Darcy expressing both anxiety and acceptance."

Lead Tim Darcy's vocal delivery and lyrics were praised by critics. Harley Brown of SPIN assessed Darcy's lyrics to have a poetic quality as a "verbal acrobat", comparing the lyrics to the work of David Foster Wallace in expressing "self-awareness balancing between celebrating and eviscerating the mundane". Similarly, Juan Edgardo Rodriguez of No Ripcord considered the album to bridge "caustic irony and blunt sincerity", noting that whilst Darcy was a "particularly unflattering vocalist", his "amusing and stimulating one-liners", "frantic irreverence" and "feral intelligence" were engrossing. Tristan Bath of Drowned in Sound commended the album's balance of "schizophrenic, paranoid, patchwork songwriting" with its "wit and emotional complexity", considering the album's uneasiness to be offset by an "implicit sense of hope and understanding we get from these songs". Describing the album as "loose and taut in equal measure", Katie Hawthorne of The Skinny focused on the pathos of Darcy's delivery and "socially acute lyricism". Robert Christgau stated that Darcy "fuses the detachment of a lecturer with the morality of a prophet", highlighting the "constriction and unresolved tension of the music".

The song Beautiful Blue Sky received specific praise. Rob Sheffield of Rolling Stone named the song as the second-best song of the decade, commending its "life affirming" nature and describing it as an uplifting song "that can catch you in a bleak moment and remind you it's not over yet". Far Out also named the song as one of the best of the decade, stating it "defined the band's career" and was the centrepiece of "one of the decade's finest albums". Scott Russell of Paste retrospectively named the song as the best released by the band, highlighting it as the "apex of their sound" for its "utterly mesmerizing post-punk construction" and capacity to "rescue meaning from life's exhausting churn". Martin Young of MusicOMH described the song as a "defining moment" and "epiphany" about "the futility of modernity and mundanity" and evidence of the "transcendent and moving" potential of indie rock. Stereogum described the song as a "perfect happy-sad song" and "multi-layered critique of development and unending consumerism". DIY stated that Beautiful Blue Sky featured "raw and inspiring verses" and an "almightily uplifting refrain that's full of expectation, wonder and a hospitable intimacy in its tone".

== Track listing ==
Sun Coming Down track listing
| No. | Title | Length |
|---|---|---|
| 1. | "Men for Miles" | 5:45 |
| 2. | "Passionate Turn" | 5:18 |
| 3. | "The Combo" | 3:35 |
| 4. | "Sun Coming Down" | 5:03 |
| 5. | "Beautiful Blue Sky" | 7:44 |
| 6. | "Celebration" | 3:12 |
| 7. | "On the Line" | 5:04 |
| 8. | "Never Better" | 4:47 |
| Total length: | | 40:28 |

== Personnel ==
- Tim Darcy - vocals, guitar
- Tim Keen - drums, violin
- Matt May - keyboard
- Ben Stidworthy - bass
