= Family Business (song) =

2004 song by Kanye West

Song by Kanye West

from the album The College Dropout
- Released: February 10, 2004
- Recorded: 2000–2003
- Studio: The Record Plant; Larrabee Sound North (Los Angeles)
- Genre: Hip-hop
- Length: 4:38
- Label: Roc-A Fella; Def Jam
- Songwriter: Kanye West
- Producer: Kanye West

"Family Business" is a song by American rapper Kanye West from his debut studio album, The College Dropout (2004). The song features additional vocals from Thomasina Atkins, Linda Petty, Beverly McCargo, Lavel Mena, Thai Jones, Kevin Shannon, and Tarrey Torae. It was written and produced by West, who had assistance from Torae in penning the lyrics about her family rather than his. A soulful number, the song interpolates "Fonky Thang" by the Dells and relies on a piano loop. Lyrically, it sees West discussing the pleasures and problems in family life.

The song received positive reviews from music critics, who mostly praised the family theme. Some described it as authenticity, while a few critics commended the composition. The song was certified gold in the United States by the Recording Industry Association of America. Chance the Rapper performed a version of the song under the title of "Family Matters" at the Summer Ends Music Festival in September 2015, before recording a studio version that was accompanied by a clip.

== Background and composition ==
"Family Business" was solely written and produced by Kanye West. Tarey Torae recorded on a number of tracks for The College Dropout in 2004, including additional vocals for the song. Torae explained that after West wanted the song to be about "real-life family", she helped him write it and the lyrics were set around her family. As the oldest among 48 grandchildren from her mother's side of the family and in the middle of the 36 on her father's side, Torae offered him much material. Torae informed West about the likes of bathing with her cousins, six people having slept together, and her auntie's notorious poor cooking. In February 2014, West's 2001 demo tape The Prerequisite experienced an internet leak, including the original version of the song. "Family Business" was recorded at the Record Plant and Larrabee Sound North studios during the album's sessions in Los Angeles, which ran from West's car accident in 2002 until December 2003.

"Family Business" is a soulful number. It contains samples of the Dells' "Fonky Thang", as written by Terry Callier and Charles Stepney. The song relies on Josh Zandman's looped piano and features additional instrumentation that was contributed by Ken Lewis. West delves into the pleasures and problems of family life in its lyrics, addressing life outside of the hip hop community. He discusses childhood embarrassments, including sharing baby baths with cousins as kept in scrapbooks and arguing with family members in the holidays. Towards the end, Torae sings "They don't mean a thang". Additional vocals are also featured from Thomasina Atkins, Linda Petty, Beverly McCargo, Lavel Mena, Thai Jones, and Kevin Shannon. Torae utters "Let's get Stevie out of jail" on the outro, referencing his godbrother.

== Release and reception ==
On February 10, 2004, West's debut studio album The College Dropout was released by Roc-A Fella and Def Jam, including "Family Business" as the 20th and penultimate track. The song was met with positive reviews from music critics, with general praise for its theme. Sal Cinquemani of Slant Magazine and Dave Heaton of PopMatters considered it to be authentically touching, with the latter calling the family tribute sweet and soulful. The New York Times journalist Kelefa Sanneh glorified the song for paying tribute to "the pleasures and frustrations of family life" as it effortlessly utilizes a "wistful piano loop", which is followed up with the "kick in the teeth" of West uttering for Stevie to leave jail. Writing for Blender, Jon Pareles commented that the song offers a reminder of life outside of hip hop from the childhood embarrassments and jailed cousin, feeling West has not managed to fall "into a fantasy world yet". Josh Love from Stylus Magazine hailed the song's nostalgia and identified it as a "domestic utopia", communicating yearning in the vein of "the heavenly pleas" of the single "Jesus Walks" (2004).

In May 2022, "Family Business" received a gold certification from the Recording Industry Association of America for selling 500,000 certified units in the United States.

== Legacy ==
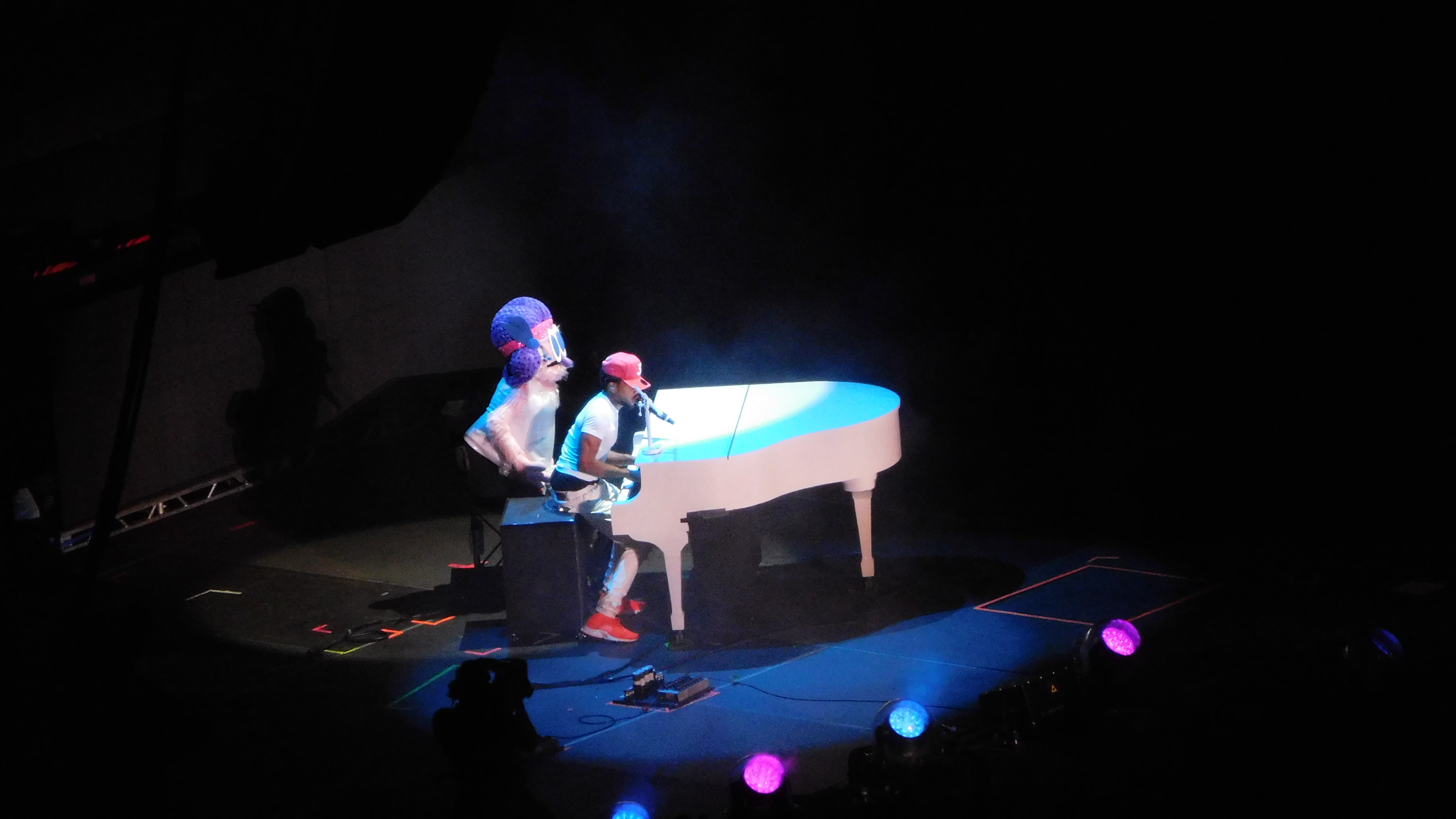
Chance the Rapper performed his version of the song at the 2015 Summer Ends Festival and subsequently released a studio edit under the title of "Family Matters", incorporating a horn section and piano.

In September 2015, West's protégé Chance the Rapper performed his version of the song at the Summer Ends Music Festival and referenced his newborn daughter by referring to himself as "Chance the Daddy". The following month, Chance the Rapper shared a studio version entitled "Family Matters" that includes a horn section and piano. The release was accompanied by a clip that incorporates footage of his Family Matters tour and Pitchfork Music Festival 2015 set, behind-the-scenes shots of his live show, and old home films.

Justin Tinsley of Andscape identified "Family Business" as West's most personal song on the 20th anniversary of The College Dropout in 2024, citing his self-awareness of subjects like bathing with cousins and sleeping with them alongside siblings. The meaning of the song in Tinsley's life started during his final months of high school as an 18-year-old and continued five years later when he listened on the way to the Washington Metro, later using it to help cope with a friend's suicide and his mother's Alzheimer's disease. Hip-hop historian and Chicago native Andrew Barber told Tinsley that the song makes him feel emotional on every listen in a way none of West's albums do and while people may change, it "was Kanye's make-or-break moment" and he does not seem to remain the same person.

== Credits and personnel ==
Credits are adapted from the album's liner notes.

Recording

- Recorded at The Record Plant (Los Angeles, CA) and Larrabee Sound North (Los Angeles)
- Mixed at Larrabee Sound North (Los Angeles)

Personnel

- Kanye West – songwriter, production
- Jacob Andrew – recording
- Rabeka Tunei – recording
- Manny Morro – mix engineer
- Thomasina Atkins – additional vocals
- Linda Petty – additional vocals
- Beverly McCargo – additional vocals
- Lavel Mena – additional vocals
- Thai Jones – additional vocals
- Kevin Shannon – additional vocals
- Tarey Torae – additional vocals
- Josh Zandman – piano
- Ken Lewis – additional instrumentation

== Certifications ==
Certifications for "Family Business"
Region	Certification	Certified units/sales
New Zealand (RMNZ)	Gold	15,000^{‡}
United Kingdom (BPI)	Silver	200,000^{‡}
United States (RIAA)	Gold	500,000^{‡}
^{‡} Sales+streaming figures based on certification alone.
