= The Gloss =

2024 album by Cola

Studio album by Cola
- Released: June 14, 2024
- Genre: Alternative rock; post-punk
- Length: 39:50
- Label: Fire Talk Records

Cola chronology
Deep in View (2022)	The Gloss (2024)	Cost of Living Adjustment (2026)

The Gloss is the second studio album by Canadian post-punk band Cola. It was released on June 14, 2024, via Fire Talk Records.

The Gloss received positive acclaim upon its release, with a Metacritic score of 79/100, indicating "generally favorable reviews". Critics praised the album's blend of '80s and '90s melody, rhythm, and straightforward production, while less favorable evaluations decried the record's lack of progression beyond the band's established songwriting sensibilities.

== Background ==
On April 4, 2023, Cola released the song "Keys Down If You Stay", the group's first studio release since their debut record, Deep in View. The song was released as a single without an accompanying album announcement.

Another single, "Bitter Melon", followed nearly a year later on March 13, 2024, but The Gloss wasn't formally announced until the release of "Pallor Tricks", a third single, on April 9. "Albatross" followed on May 9, with "Pulling Quotes" serving as the final pre-album single before the record's release on June 14.

=== Composition and songwriting ===
Band members Tim Darcy, Ben Stidworthy, and Evan Cartwright characterized the songwriting process for The Gloss as a product, in part, of their experiences making Deep in View. "A band's first record is always going to be an experiment," Cartwright said. "You bring things to the table without knowing what the band sounds like yet. Once you play the material, tour, and record, you realize what the band actually sounds like. [The second record] is always more relaxed because you know what you're writing for."

Darcy contextualized the record's contrast to not only Cola's previous record, but to his and Stidworthy's previous work with Montreal post-punk band Ought: "Ought songs used to be carved out of these gargantuan jams ... Cola is a refreshing change of pace. To go into a room together and have the songs already be fairly apparent was great."

Stidworthy spoke to a similar pursuit of directness in contributing to The Gloss, which he jokingly referred to as a "rustic" quality arising in part from the pentatonic scales around which he crafts his bass parts. "Speaking for myself, I wanted at times – because I was comfortable with my role as a bassist – for my musical voice to be heard more," Stidworthy said. "Specifically with this record, I tried hard to make the bass more interesting, which I know sounds like a big statement. … So I decided to do something even more simple … although 'simple' is in this case quite a loaded word."

== Critical reception ==
Professional ratings
Aggregate scores
Source	Rating
Metacritic	79/100
Review scores
Source	Rating
AllMusic	4/5 stars
Under the Radar	8.5/10
Rolling Stone	80/100
DIY	4/5 stars
Pitchfork	7.6/10
Exclaim!	60/100
The Line of Best Fit	70/100

The Gloss received modest acclaim upon its release. On Metacritic, which assigns a normalized score out of 100 to ratings from publications, the album received a mean score of 79 based on 9 reviews, indicating "generally favorable reviews".

Rolling Stone's Jon Dolan called the album "top-shelf minimalist guitar racket," highlighting its "propulsive and jumpy" rhythm and the "self-interrogating attitude" of its lyrics: "Laying bright, bracing guitars over taut, tetchy, minimalist drums and bass, their sound brings to mind Wire and the very earliest Cure and Echo and the Bunnymen. Yet where those bands had the decaying post-industrial England of the 1970s as a backdrop, Cola are products of our own more ambiently dehumanized times."

Writing for Pitchfork, Stuart Berman called the album "a model of focus, precision, and economy — the sound of players who know exactly who they are and what they want to do" and praised its "nervous, claustrophobic tension". Matt Young's 7/10 review for The Line of Best Fit indicated assent, highlighting "a mix of winsome romanticism and righteous anger" he noticed on The Gloss — but admitting that within that interplay, "it's occasionally difficult to see which are tongue-in-cheek or genuine."

=== Year-end lists ===
Select year-end rankings for The Gloss
Publication	Accolade	Rank	Ref.
Pitchfork	The 30 Best Rock Albums of 2024	20	
Rolling Stone	The 50 Best Indie Rock Albums of 2024	29	

== Track listing ==
All tracks are written by Timothy Darcy, Ben Stidworthy, and Evan Cartwright.

No.	Title	Length
1.	"Tracing Hallmarks"	3:58
2.	"Pulling Quotes"	4:42
3.	"Pallor Tricks"	3:57
4.	"Albatross"	3:26
5.	"Down To Size"	3:22
6.	"Keys Down If You Stay"	3:46
7.	"Reprise"	2:57
8.	"Nice Try"	3:59
9.	"Bell Wheel"	3:30
10.	"Bitter Melon"	6:09
Total length:		39:50

== Personnel ==
=== Musicians ===
- Tim Darcy – lead vocals, guitar
- Ben Stidworthy – bass, guitar (track 3), Mellotron (track 3), organ (track 2)
- Evan Cartwright – drums, supercollider (track 7, track 9), lead guitar (track 9)

=== Technical ===
- Valentin Ignat – recording and mixing
- Nezar Keplatskyy – assistant engineering
- Steph Dutton – cover artwork and design
