= Cola (band) =

Post-punk band from Montreal, Quebec

- Origin: Montreal, Quebec, Canada
- Genres: Art punk; post-punk; noise rock
- Years active: 2020–present
- Label: Fire Talk
- Spinoff of: Choir! Choir! Choir!; Ought; U.S. Girls
- Members: Tim Darcy; Ben Stidworthy; Evan Cartwright
- Website: cola.band

Cola is a post-punk band from Montreal, Quebec, Canada. The band consists of Tim Darcy (vocals, guitar), Ben Stidworthy (bass), and Evan Cartwright (drums).

== History ==
The band's roots trace back to late 2019, when members of Ought, Tim Darcy and Ben Stidworthy, began writing music with Evan Cartwright of U.S. Girls. Darcy and Sidworthy were in Montreal at the time, while Cartwright was in Toronto. After informal writing and music sessions, the members began exchanging lyrics and song ideas into 2020 and 2021. In November 2021, the band Ought announced their disbandment, and announced the band, Cola the same day. With the announcement of the band was the release of their debut single, "Blank Curtain". The song was met with critical praise, with Rob Sheffield of Rolling Stone describing the song having a "gorgeously obsessive guitar groove". The band told Destroy Exist that the song, "is a quarter note kick drum pushing 240 bpm, a drone-like chord progression, and declarative vocals cutting through the haze. If you could invert the color of the Blank Curtain, you might have something like a Chicago house track that sounds like a band in a room."

On February 22, 2022, the band announced their debut studio album, Deep in View. The album was released on May 20, 2022.

In April 2024, Cola announced their sophomore record, The Gloss, and released the record on June 14, 2024, through Fire Talk Records.

On February 18, 2026, the band announced their third record, Cost of Living Adjustment, alongside the first single "Hedgesitting." Cost of Living Adjustment released on May 8 on Fire Talk Records.

== Band members ==
- Tim Darcy – guitars, vocals
- Ben Stidworthy – bass
- Evan Cartwright – drums

== Discography ==
=== Studio albums ===
- Deep in View (2022)
- The Gloss (2024)
- Cost of Living Adjustment (2026)

=== Singles ===
- "Blank Curtain" (2021)
- "So Excited" (2022)
- "Water Table" (2022)
- "Degree" (2022)
- "Fulton Park" (2022)
- "Keys Down If You Stay" (2023)
- "Bitter Melon" (2024)
- "Pallor Tricks" (2024)
- "Albatross" (2024)
- "Pulling Quotes" (2024)
- "Mendicant" (2025)
- "Hedgesitting" (2026)
- "Conflagration Mindset" (2026)
- "Skywriter's Sigh" (2026)
- "Haveluck Country" (2026)
