= Homecoming (Kanye West song) =

2008 single by Kanye West featuring Chris Martin

Single by Kanye West featuring Chris Martin

from the album Graduation
- B-side: "Good Night"
- Released: February 2, 2008
- Recorded: 2006
- Studio: Fever Recording (North Hollywood); Abbey Road (London); Sony Music (NYC); Record Plant; Ocean Way Recording (Hollywood)
- Genre: Hip hop; pop
- Length: 3:23
- Label: Roc-A-Fella; Def Jam
- Songwriters: Kanye West; Chris Martin; Warryn Campbell
- Producers: Kanye West; Warryn Campbell

Kanye West singles chronology
"Flashing Lights" (2007)	"Homecoming" (2008)	"Finer Things" (2008)

Music video
- "Homecoming" on YouTube

"Homecoming" is a song by American rapper Kanye West from his third studio album, Graduation (2007). The song was written by West and Warryn Campbell, who served as the producers, along with English singer Chris Martin of Coldplay, who makes a guest appearance. Martin came up with the concept during a jam session with West at Abbey Road Studios in February 2006. It was a re-working of West's 2001 recording "Home (Windy)", which was inspired by Common's "I Used to Love H.E.R.". The recording featured John Legend and a different beat, with a theme around West's hometown of Chicago that was maintained for the final version.

On February 2, 2008, "Homecoming" was released in the United Kingdom by Roc-A-Fella Records and Def Jam Recordings as the album's fifth and final single. It is a hip hop song with elements of gospel and pub rock, accompanied by Martin's arena rock piano. The singer also performs the chorus, questioning returning home and adding a hint of reggae. In the lyrics of the song, West delivers an ode to Chicago and narrates his relationship with the city. He personifies Chicago as a childhood sweetheart named Wendy, expressing his guilt and rejection from her after leaving for fame.

"Homecoming" received mixed reviews from music critics, who were mostly divided in their responses to Martin's feature. Some praised West's lyricism and emotional impact, while a few critics identified the song as a highlight of Graduation. It was later ranked as among West's best songs by numerous publications, including The Jamaica Observer and CraveOnline. The song charted at number 69 on the US Billboard Hot 100, while reaching number 15 on the Hot Rap Songs chart. It was more successful in Europe, peaking within the top 10 of Ireland and the United Kingdom. The song attained top 40 positions in 11 other countries, including Norway and Denmark. In the United States, the song was certified triple platinum by the Recording Industry Association of America (RIAA). It was certified platinum in Denmark by IFPI Danmark and in the UK by British Phonographic Industry.

An accompanying black-and-white music video was filmed in Chicago during November 2007 and released in April 2008. The video features a montage of West traversing the streets of the city and showcases its landmarks, alongside cameos from his friends and rap acts there. It was nominated for Best Hip Hop Video at the 2008 MTV Video Music Awards. West delivered a live performance of "Homecoming" at The Box nightclub in August 2010, accompanied by Legend at the grand piano. The rapper performed the song at the Global Gathering in 2008 and Coachella in 2011. Dave delivered a piano cover of it live in April 2022.

== Background ==
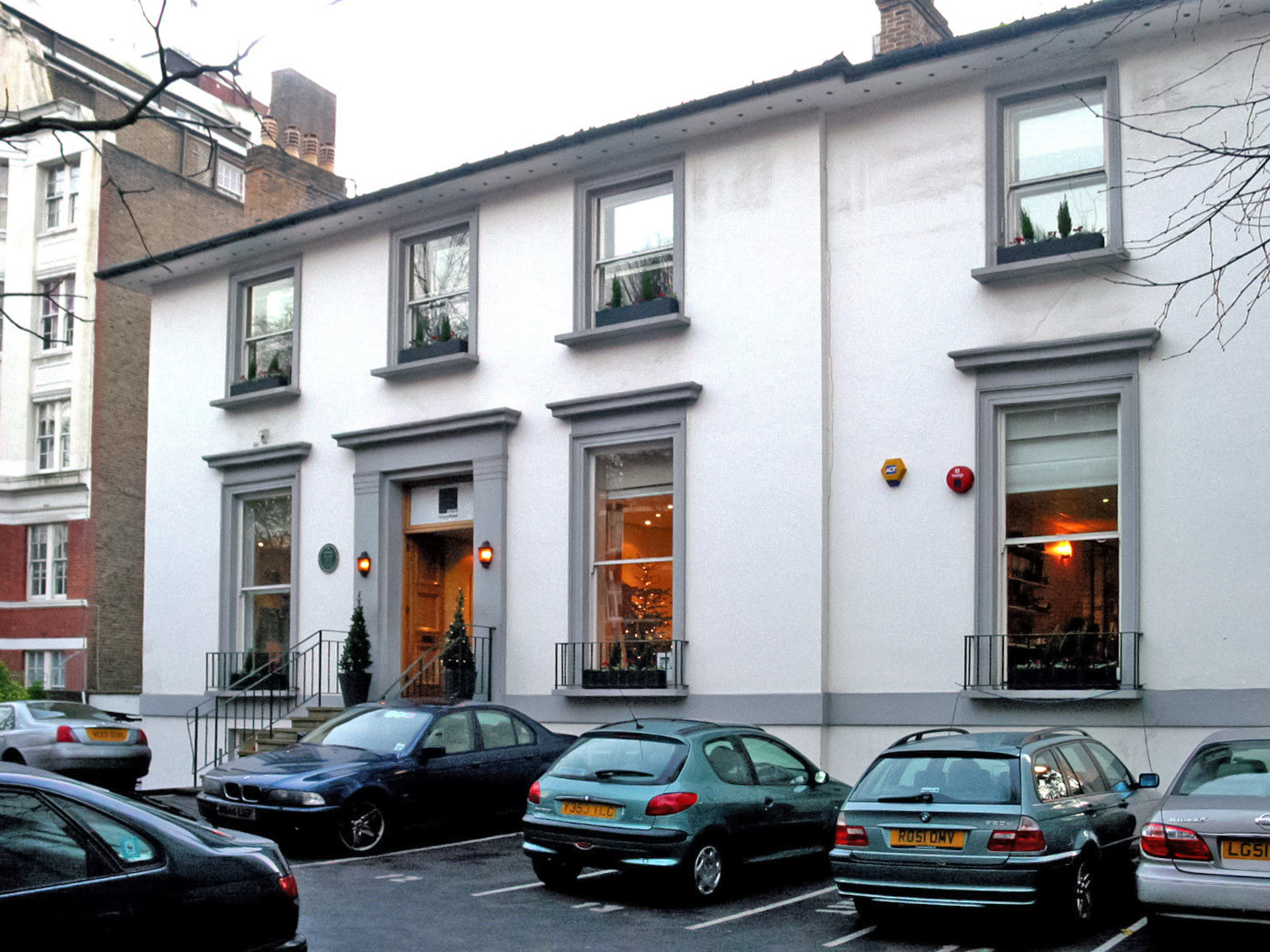
The façade of Abbey Road Studios, where the song was recorded and West first met Martin by chance.

"Homecoming" was produced by West and record producer Warryn Campbell, who served as co-writers with Coldplay's lead vocalist Chris Martin. On February 13, 2006, Coldplay played a live show for BBC Radio 2 at London's Abbey Road Studios, where West was in attendance. West had wanted an appearance from Martin on "Homecoming" to crossover to working with the member of a mainstream band; they collaborated on the song after the show. The rapper felt them being in the same place showed the collaboration was meant to be and brought by God, saying he "serve[d] as a vessel". After fellow rapper Jay-Z heard the song himself, he decided to invite Martin to make a guest appearance on one of his songs. The collaborators worked on "Beach Chair", released before Graduation on Jay-Z's Kingdom Come in 2006. On fellow album track "Big Brother", West references the tension that came from Jay-Z having a feature from Martin after he told him of their collaboration. West recalled that he was initially reluctant for their collaboration due to his competitive nature, later regretting this. In December 2008, West praised Coldplay's for their consistent musicality and representing British stadium music.

"Homecoming" was a reworking of West's track known as "Home (Windy)" that was recorded for a demo tape in 2001; the term "Windy" in its original title referred to Chicago's nickname of Windy City. The track relied on a looped sample of harmonious vocals from Patti LaBelle and the BlueBelles's 1963 cover of the show tune "You'll Never Walk Alone", accompanied by West's boom bap production. It featured a hook from singer John Legend under his real name of John Stephens, singing about soldiers who did not make it back home. "Home (Windy)" circulated under the new title "Home" on numerous mixtapes that West released over the years, including Get Well Soon... in 2003. "Home" was also available on an advance copy of West's debut studio album The College Dropout (2004), the same year that Legend released his debut Get Lifted with the rapper's production. However, this version was never released due to a leak months before its intended initial release date of August 12, 2003. West used the opportunity to refine The College Dropout, as the project was significantly remixed, remastered, and revised prior to being released. In the end, "Home" and a number of original album tracks were retracted. West revised or reused lyrics from his early demo and mixtape tracks, such as basing "Homecoming" on "Home".

== Writing and development ==
An entirely new beat was made for "Homecoming", even though it used verses from "Home", while Legend's hook was replaced by a chorus from Martin. The song served as a loving, emotional ode to Chicago. West expresses a metaphoric narrative with a feminized personification of Chicago, depicting the city as a childhood sweetheart. The rapper kept most of his lyrics from the original, which were inspired by his labelmate and fellow Chicago rapper Common's "I Used to Love H.E.R." (1994) and he changed certain ones as Martin requested him to. He led Martin to forgo his typical midtempo balladry in favor of flashier, inspirational piano work. Martin's pounding piano was looped to begin off-beat for a raw, hip-hop sound, which displays a gospel influence recurrent in West's productions.

The song was described as "very emotional" by West during an interview with Concrete Loop on October 5, 2007. Inspired by his worldwide stadium tour with Irish rock band U2 from 2005 to 2006, he redesigned the song for it to be chanted. During the recording and production of Graduation, West was listening to other bands like Keane, the Killers, and Radiohead for heavy inspiration. Accordingly, the new composition features sharp piano flourishes placed over booming, stadium music to accompany a sing-along pop chorus. Meanwhile, the piano accompaniment is laden with energetic minor chords and results in arena rock.

== Recording ==
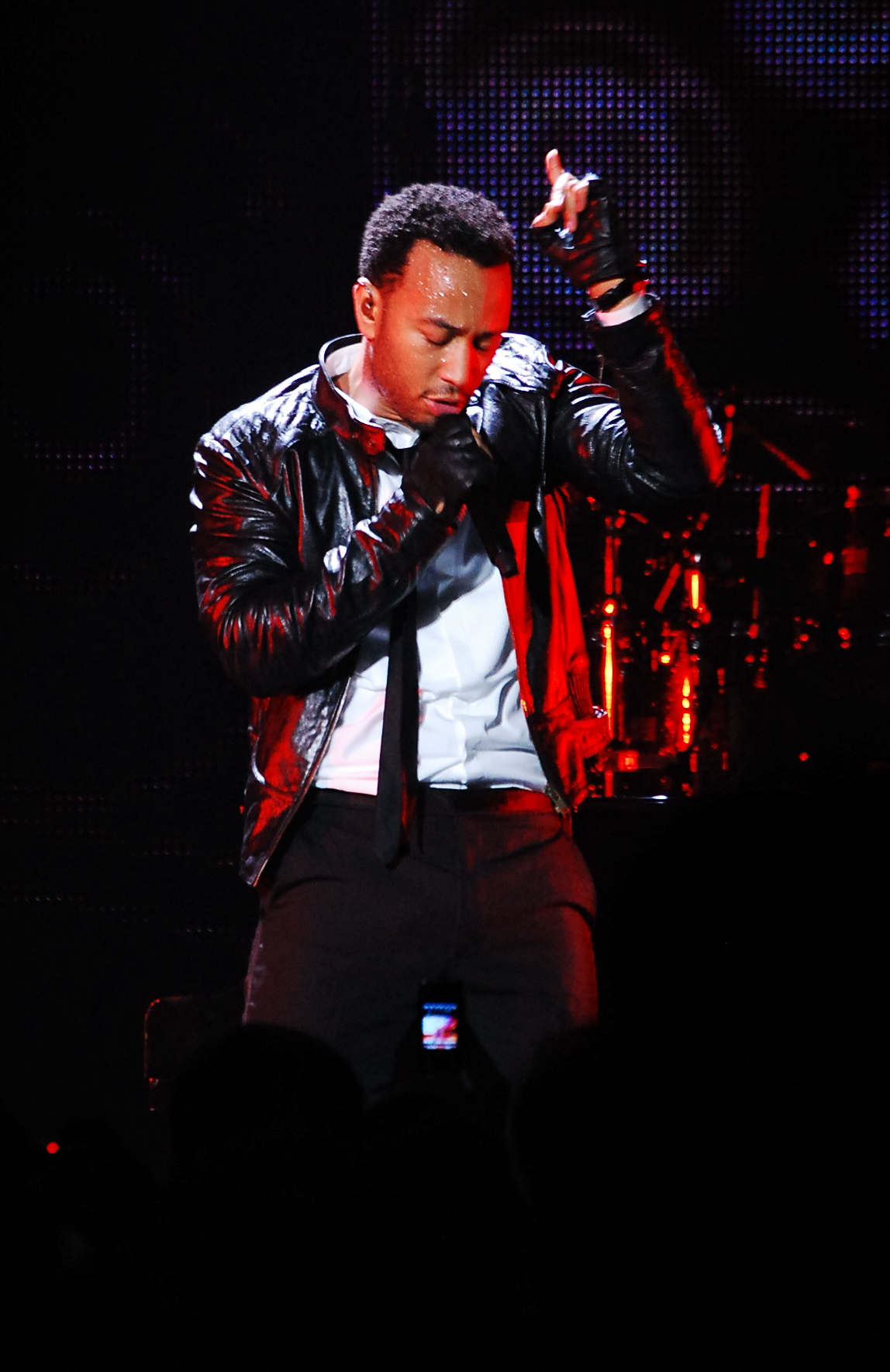
The original incarnation of the song featured a different chorus sung by John Legend.

West and Martin met each other for the very first time when Coldplay played a show at Abbey Road on February 13, 2006. The rapper originally spent a one-day session in the venue's Studio Two recording strings, then booked the Studio Three for the week's remainder. Engineer Mirek Stiles spent this time working with different vocals takes and loops alongside the production team of West, who was then joined by Martin in the control room. West and Martin engaged in an impromptu jam session that included Martin singing into a Neumann U 47 and resulted in "Homecoming"; the singer came up with the concept. A beat was played to Martin from West intended for his 2005 single "Heard 'Em Say", to which he responded by suggesting it should be "more like a homecoming or something". Studio Two, used for an initial session, was the same studio the Beatles recorded in and West later had his photo on the wall of Abbey Road alongside the band in 2021. At the time of recording, West was traveling around the world to meet collaborators. This was a different approach to his later years when people visited him to collaborate, and he frequented the Record Plant in Hollywood with percussionist Jon Brion. West also traveled to the Sony Music Studios in New York City (NYC), the Fever Recording Studio in North Hollywood, Los Angeles, and Ocean Way Recording in Hollywood to record "Homecoming". The song was mixed at Chalice Recording Studios in Hollywood and Chung King Studios in NYC.

West retracted the original vocal sample of "You'll Never Walk Alone" for "Homecoming" and replaced it with a looped piano riff, which he decorated over a stadium-friendly beat. Much of Graduation contained glossy, synthesizer-based productions influenced by West's experimentation with electronic music. He opted for a contrasting style on "Homecoming", with a more stripped-down and piano-based instrumental to complement the introspectiveness of its lyrics.

== Composition and lyrics ==
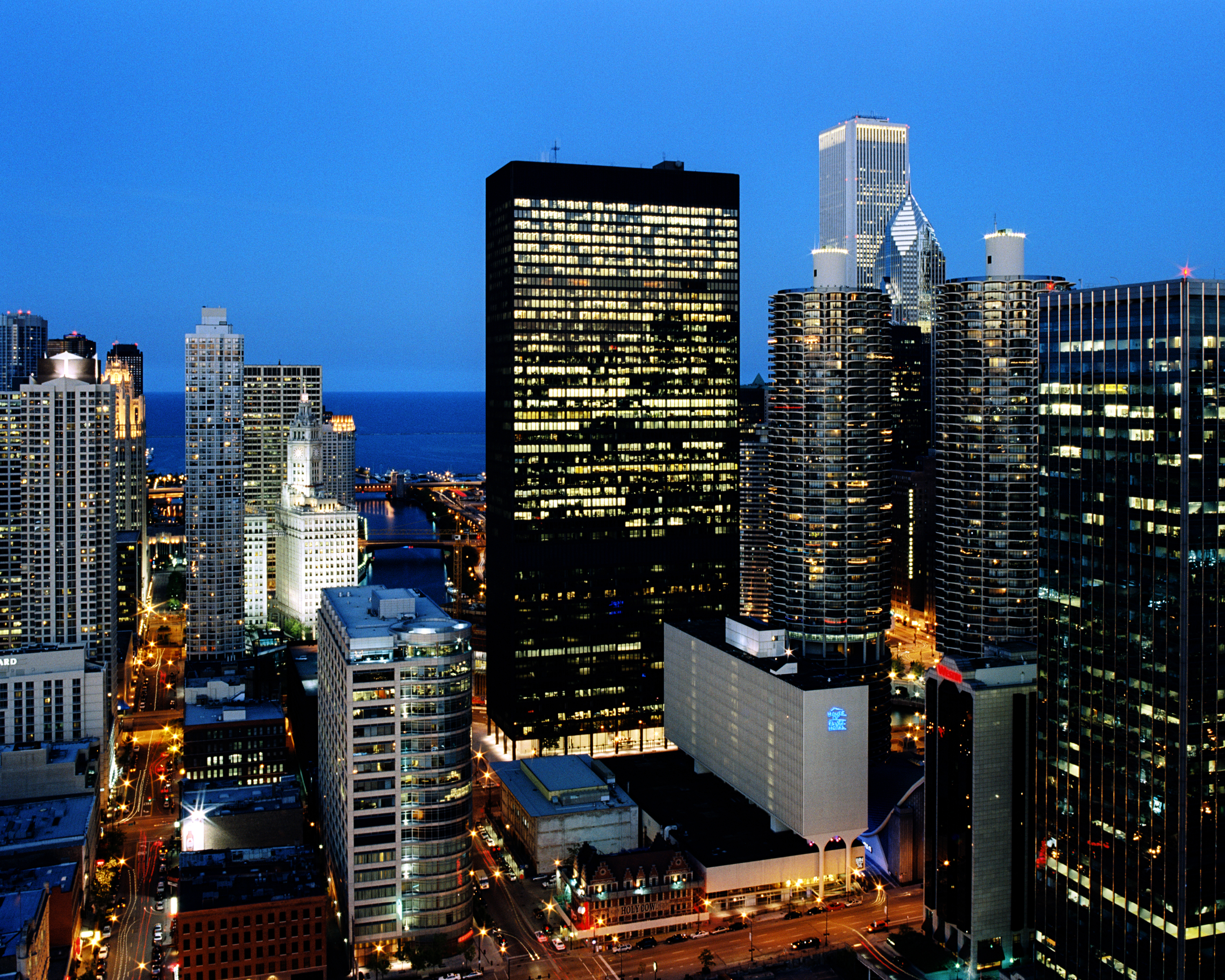
The song was originally known as "Home", with its theme of a tribute to West's hometown of Chicago maintained.

Musically, "Homecoming" is an upbeat hip-hop song, with a duration of three minutes and twenty-six seconds (3:26). The track is a gospel-inflected jam, featuring an anthemic stadium beat and elements of pub rock. The song includes a raw, arena rock piano riff from Martin, which is looped. Martin plays an energetic piano, adding gospel elements. The instrumental of the song relies on the piano, as do the energetic minor chords. Its instrumentation also consists of percussion and heavy drums.

According to the sheet music published at Musicnotes.com by EMI Music Publishing, the song is set in common time, with a moderate tempo of 88 beats per minute. "Homecoming" is written in the key of E minor, and Martin's vocal range spans from a low of D_{4} to a high of E_{5}. The musical composition uses four-measure phrases, which follow a basic chord progression of Em–D/F♯–Em/G–G–Am7–D/C–Cmaj7–Bm7. Opening on a hammering E minor triad, the song's piano arrangement begins off-beat and incorporates flourishes. Throughout the track, the noise of a cheering crowd can be heard faintly in the background.

"Homecoming"
A 20-second sample of West rapping the first verse to "Homecoming". West personifies his hometown of Chicago as a childhood sweetheart called Wendy that he identifies as "Windy", narrating their bittersweet relationship as he regrets leaving her and mentions how she rejects him. His performance is accompanied with an instrumentation driven by Martin's looped raw piano riff, alongside heavy drums, percussion, and the faint background noise of a cheering crowd.

Lyrically, "Homecoming" serves as a love ode to Chicago from West and Martin. West uses introspection in a narrative that follows his bittersweet relationship with Chicago as his hometown across the song's two verses, personifying the city as a childhood sweetheart named Wendy. The rapper identifies her as "Windy" in the lyrics, mentioning that she "likes to blow trees". He acknowledges that the childhood sweetheart slipped away and expresses guilt over having left her for fame, not being able to feel at home after leaving despite rejection from her. The lyrics reference Common's "I Used to Love H.E.R.", a rap song that similarly tells of a metaphoric relationship with a woman. After each verse, Martin sings a smooth, sing-along pop chorus that poses the question of "Do you think about me now and then? / 'Cause I'm coming home again". His vocals were compared by The Observer and Digital Spy to that of musician and singer-songwriter Sting, frontman of the British post-punk band the Police. Despite being from Devon, United Kingdom, Martin sings of a memory of fireworks at Lake Michigan, one of the North American Great Lakes. The singer also croons on the chorus and he delivers the line "e-yo-oh-oh" in a reggae style, evoking Jamaican musician Bob Marley.

== Promotion and release ==
In January 2007, West told Billboard that he was considering releasing the song as the lead single for Graduation. "Homecoming" was first previewed when the digital radio station BBC Radio 1Xtra hosted an "Audience With Kanye West" event at the BBC Radio Music Theatre in London on August 13. West guided a specially selected audience through Graduation, playing the album on his MacBook Air laptop via a speaker system. "Homecoming" was one of the tracks that West played during a listening session for Graduation at the New World Stages in Manhattan, NY on August 28, 2007. Inside an auditorium, West revealed his influences and aspirations. West played the songs from start-to-finish uninterrupted, with special programs of the lyrics handed out. When an audience member asked West why "Home" became "Homecoming" with a new beat, he replied that he believed the original would not suit stadiums, but that the lyrics were too good to not use.

On September 11, 2007, Graduation was released, including "Homecoming" as the twelfth track. West subsequently imparted that it was among his three favorite songs from the album. On February 2, 2008, the song was released for digital download in the UK by West's labels Roc-A-Fella and Def Jam as the fifth and final single from the album. The labels later issued it on a maxi-single in Germany on May 9, with "Good Night" serving as the B-side. Four days later, the song was serviced to US rhythmic contemporary radio stations. On July 1, 2008, the song was released on a CD single through Universal.

== Critical reception ==
"Homecoming" was met with mixed reviews from music critics. Giving the song four out of five stars in Digital Spy, Nick Levine described it as the "emotional centrepiece" of Graduation, commenting that West shows his humanity and Martin provides "a pomp-filled piano riff" with undertones of English singer and composer Elton John. Levine noted how the song could have ended up becoming "a crass exercise in mutual back-slapping", thanking Martin for managing to bring out West's softness that marked "the bragging rapper's most affecting moment to date". Jackie Im of Treblezine declared that the song exceeded his expectations, praising Martin's vocals on the hook for their heavy catchiness and his piano as reminiscent of Elton John, summarizing it as a "nice little pop song that leads into Kanye's most earnest moment". Pitchfork's Mark Pytlik wrote that the song seemingly "hits all the right notes", aided by Martin. Vadim Rizov from Slant Magazine said the song is among West's strongest rapping on the album and quipped that in contrast to Jay-Z's collaboration with Martin on "Beach Chair", West may be able to "make Coldplay acceptable for the cool kids again". Ann Powers, for the Los Angeles Times, also held the belief that West bests Jay-Z's utilization of Martin's "reedy pipes". Paste reviewer Ross Bonaime wrote that West's usage of Martin is the most successful and they are a "undeniably pretty great" duo, although found it weird hearing the singer sing of Chicago as home. Writing for NME, Louis Pattison was satisfied with the song, but questioned the decision for Martin to appear after he worked with Jay-Z.

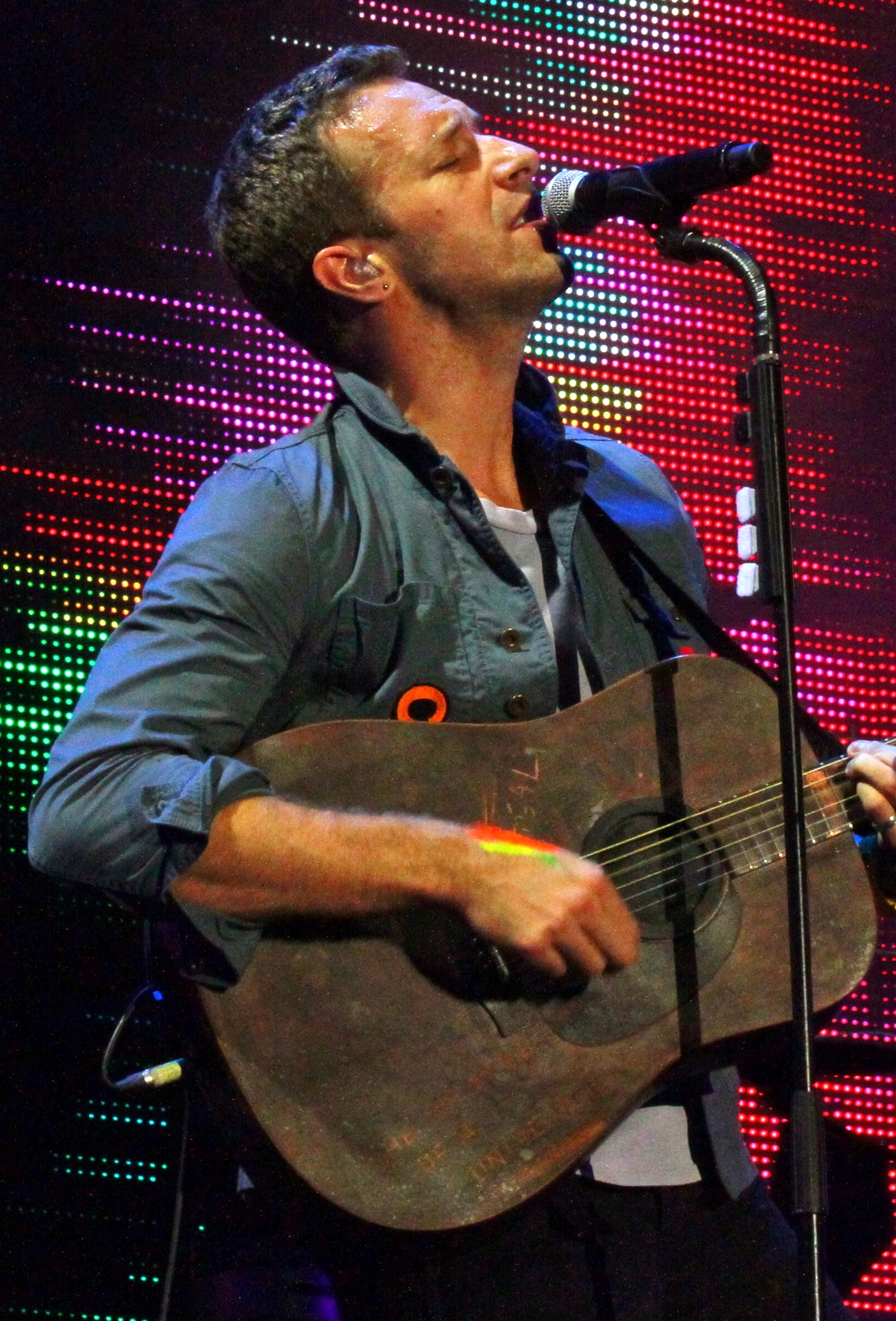
Music critics were split in their feelings towards Martin's appearance. Some praised his vocal performance, while others were unsure of the decision to feature him on the song as a British singer.

Several music journalists questioned the authenticity of Martin's appearance on "Homecoming". Dorian Lynskey of The Guardian paid attention to its flaws, advising against guesting Martin on a song about Chicago due to his Devon nativity and thought even his emotion cannot make being "moved by the memory" of Lake Michigan fireworks convincing. Nathan Rabin from The A.V. Club viewed the collaboration as showing West's "broad musical palette that occasionally gets him into trouble", feeling Martin to be unsuitable for representing Chicago's strong musical heritage. Exclaim!'s Del Cowie remarked that "Homecoming" lacks the level of emotion that a "hometown ode should elicit", attributing this to Martin's "yodelling soccer yob". Labeling the track as one of the album's transgressions, Noah Love of Chart Attack stated that it would be better without the singer's crooning and considered West was still finding his lyrical potential. Chicago Tribune music critic Greg Kot dismissed Martin's vocals and the "cornball piano riff", feeling that the song fails and results in the album's biggest misstep.

Some reviews of the song were not focused on Martin's vocals. While he upheld the belief that Graduation did not meet its expectations, Kyle Ryan of The A.V. Club wrote that the song is an example of "its usual share of West gold". NOW Magazine editor Jason Richards labeled the song as the highlight of the album. At Stylus Magazine, Jayson Greene expressed that the usage of "Home" for the song is the album's prime example of West's "narrow lyrical focus" of reiterating his older works and strongly demonstrates he has not left his defining moment, despite "a big, stadium-ready beat". On a similar note, The Boston Globe's Julian Benbow criticized West for the awkwardness of combining "a song from a four-year-old mix-tape" with heavy drums and piano.

=== Accolades ===
Despite receiving mixed reviews, "Homecoming" appeared on several retrospective lists of West's best songs. In 2016, Complex listed the song at number 38 among West's 100 best songs. Also in this year, Jeva Lange of The Week identified the song as West's best track and was impressed by his personification of Chicago that showed a deep love, praising its evolution for the original too. To honor West's 39 birthday in June, The Jamaica Observer composed a list of his top 10 best songs and placed "Homecoming" 10th. In 2017, CraveOnline ranked "Homecoming" as West's best song; the staff summarized that the instrumentation is the highlight and combined with the topic of his love for Chicago, makes for a "high point". Highsnobiety cited "Homecoming" as the 40th best West song six years later, with Donovan Barnett referring to it as a "classic Kanye cut" for the piano instrumentation, ode to the city, and Martin's chorus.

"Homecoming" was declared the 50th greatest Chicago rap song by Complex. For Chart Attack's list of Kanye West's 10 Most Stripped-Down, Minimal Songs, head writer Jordan Darville ranked it at number four. Discussing the track's lyricism, he mentioned it is among the introspectiveness of Graduation that is "much more deeply felt". Billboard cited "Homecoming" as among West's 10 most romantic songs; Jason Lipshutz stated that it marked one of rap's most loving hometown tributes. "Homecoming" received a nomination for Best R&B/Hip-Hop Track at the 2008 Teen Choice Awards.

== Music video ==
=== Background ===
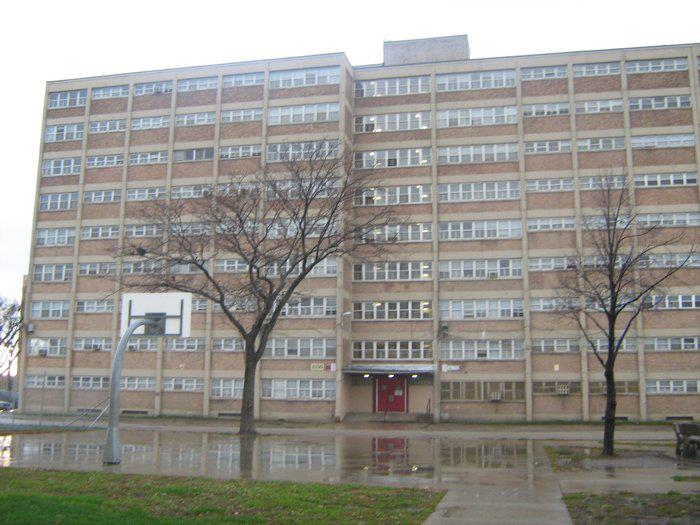
Harold L. Ickes Homes was one of the housing projects that West visited for the video's various filming locations.

The accompanying music video was shot by the acclaimed director Hype Williams on location in Chicago on November 6, 2007. Williams and West had previously worked together on several music videos, including fellow album tracks "Can't Tell Me Nothing" and "Stronger". The music video was filmed entirely in black-and-white, with Williams taking a simplistic visual approach. West dressed in a patchwork shirt with a keffiyeh that had contrasting patterns.

Prior to its premiere, West posted screenshots of the music video to his blog on March 6, 2008. He also made exclusive behind-the-scenes images from the shoot available. Additional behind-the-scenes footage was later obtained and release by Channel Zero in December 2010. The footage showed West on set with rappers Bump J, Wildstyle of Crucial Conflict, and Malik Yusef. Cameos were featured from Don C, Virgil Abloh, Ibn Jasper, Morocco Vaughn, and Orr Academy High School students. On April 1, 2008, the music video was released on West's blog.

=== Synopsis and reception ===
A screenshot of West standing in front of the Cloud Gate (The Bean) sculpture at Millennium Park in the black-and-white video.

The music video features a monochromatic montage of West rapping in a truck, wandering throughout many different areas of Chicago. The montage features slow-motion shots and angles highlighting the streets, buildings, monuments and citizens. The various locations and landmarks include the Cloud Gate sculpture at Millennium Park, DuSable Museum of African American History, Tribune Tower, Jay Pritzker Pavilion, the Sears Tower, and the Cabrini–Green and Harold L. Ickes housing projects. Some of West's early friends follow him around Chicago, including a young girl that repeatedly makes appearances. Cameos are also made by local hip-hop acts like L.E.P. Bogus Boys and Common, whose work is referenced in the song. Throughout the video, these scenes are interspersed with animated silhouette outlines and shots of West rapping the song's verses. He is surrounded by reflective mirrors on top of a moving vehicle and Martin singing the chorus while playing an upright piano.

The music video was listed at number 84 on BET's Notarized: Top 100 Videos of 2008 countdown. On their 2013 list of West's 42 best music videos, Complex placed the visual at number 32; the writers praised the montage of West's revisit to the city with the accompaniment of friends and rap acts. VH1 ranked the music video as the fifth greatest clip filmed in an artist's hometown a year later, with Lucelenia Amparo hailing the shots of Chicago and "the perfect touch" from Martin. It received a nomination for Best Hip Hop Video at the 2008 MTV Video Music Awards.

== Commercial performance ==
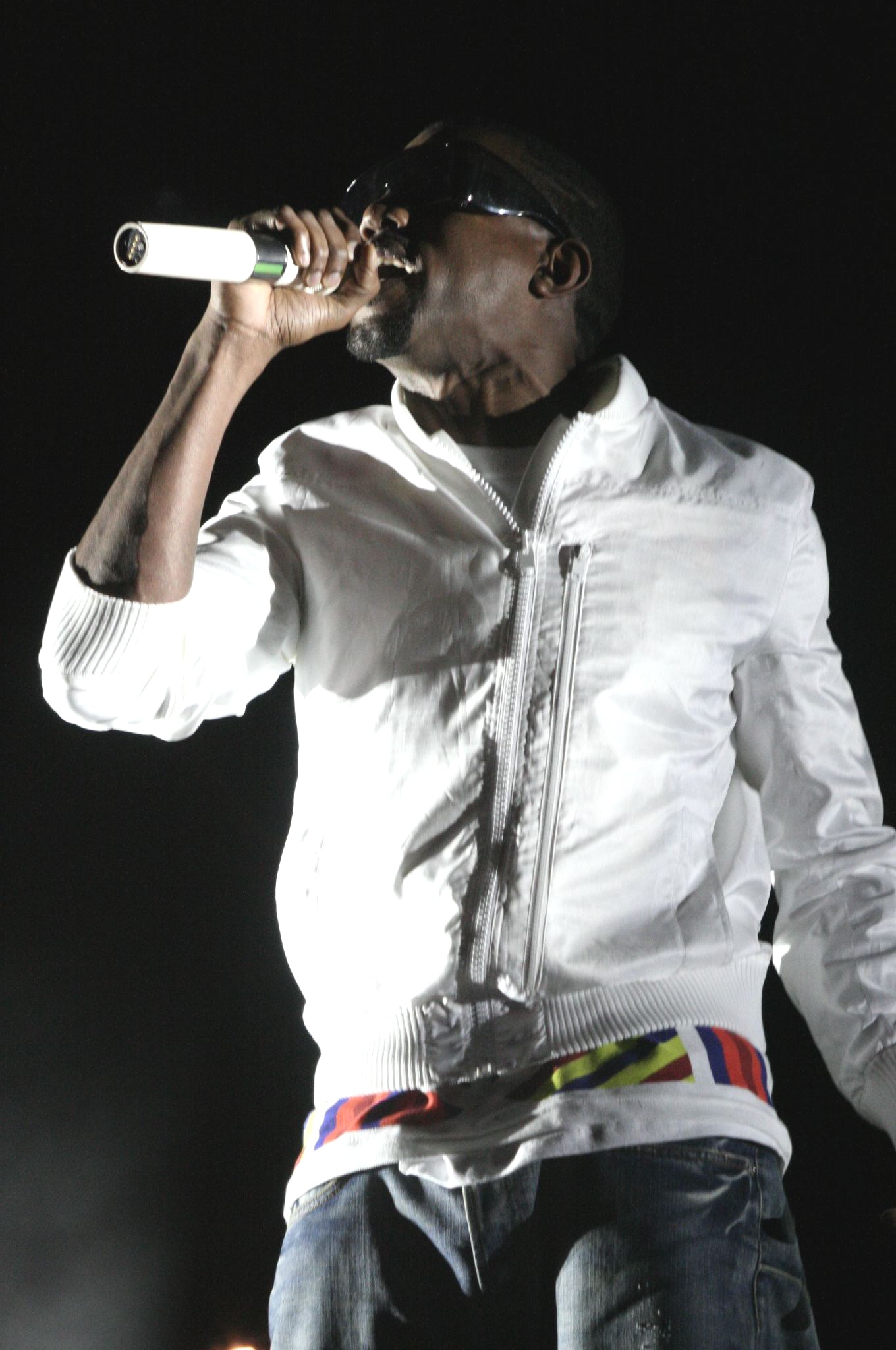
"Homecoming" was most successful in Europe, charting highest in Ireland at number five and also becoming West's eighth top-10 single in the United Kingdom.

"Homecoming" debuted at number 96 on the US Billboard Hot 100 for the issue dated June 7, 2008. The next week, it rose to number 83 on the Hot 100. The track then moved up 12 spaces, a week before peaking at number 69 on the chart. It lasted for seven weeks on the Hot 100. "Homecoming" entered the US Billboard Hot R&B/Hip-Hop Songs chart at number 68 on the issue dated May 22, 2008, standing as the highest debut of the week. Thereafter, the track peaked at number 33 on the chart issue dated June 14. That very same week, it debuted at number 19 on the US Hot Rap Songs chart. Around a month later, the track reached its peak position of number 15 on the Hot Rap Songs chart issue dated July 12, 2008. By August 2015, "Homecoming" had been certified platinum by the Recording Industry Association of America (RIAA) for amassing 1,000,000 certifiable units in the United States, standing as one of West's 10 platinum singles in the country for 2015. It was later awarded a triple platinum certification by the RIAA for reaching 3,000,000 certified units in the US on August 8, 2023.

"Homecoming" was commercially successful across Europe. The track debuted at number 19 on the Irish Singles Chart for January 10, 2008, marking the week's highest entry. Two weeks later, it peaked at number five on the chart. The track debuted at number 77 on the UK Singles Chart for the issue date September 29, 2007. It then exited the chart, re-entering at number 69 on December 30. The track peaked at number nine on the UK Singles Chart on January 20, 2008. It became West's eighth top-10 track in the UK and his seventh as a solo artist, while lasting for 20 weeks on the chart. At the end of 2008, the track ranked as the 91st most successful release on the UK Singles Chart. The track stands as West's 20th biggest hit of all time in the UK up to August 5, 2021. On September 9, 2022, "Homecoming" received a platinum certification from the British Phonographic Industry (BPI) for selling 600,000 units in the country. The track debuted at number 11 on Norway's Topp 40 Singles chart, while it entered the Finnish Singles Chart at number 17 and peaked four positions higher after fluctuating for a few weeks. "Homecoming" charted at numbers 15 and 16 in Denmark and Turkey, respectively. The track further attained top 40 positions in Germany, Sweden, the Netherlands, Austria, and Switzerland. On October 17, 2023, the track was awarded a platinum certification from IFPI Danmark for shipments of 90,000 units in Denmark. In Oceania, the track reached number 22 on the New Zealand Singles Chart. "Homecoming" further peaked at number 32 on the ARIA Singles Chart in Australia, where it was certified gold by the Australian Recording Industry Association (ARIA) for shipping 35,000 copies on December 31, 2015.

== Live performances ==
West included "Homecoming" as one of the closing performances from the setlist on his Glow in the Dark Tour, which began on April 16, 2008, at the KeyArena in Seattle, Washington. It was one of the various songs taken from West's first three studio albums that he utilized for his conceptual concert. The songs served to form a space opera storyline, telling the tale of how a stranded space traveler struggles for over a year making attempts to escape from a distant planet while on a mission to bring creativity back to Earth. West walked across the stage rocking a white jacket and large eyewear while performing "Homecoming" on the final night of Lollapalooza 2008 in August, co-headlining the festival in Chicago. The song was performed by West during his 90-minute headlining set for the annual dance music festival Global Gathering at Long Marston Airfield near Stratford-upon-Avon, Warwickshire, on July 25, 2008. West was the first hip-hop artist to headline the festival and he was accompanied by lighting and smoke effects, alongside backup singers.

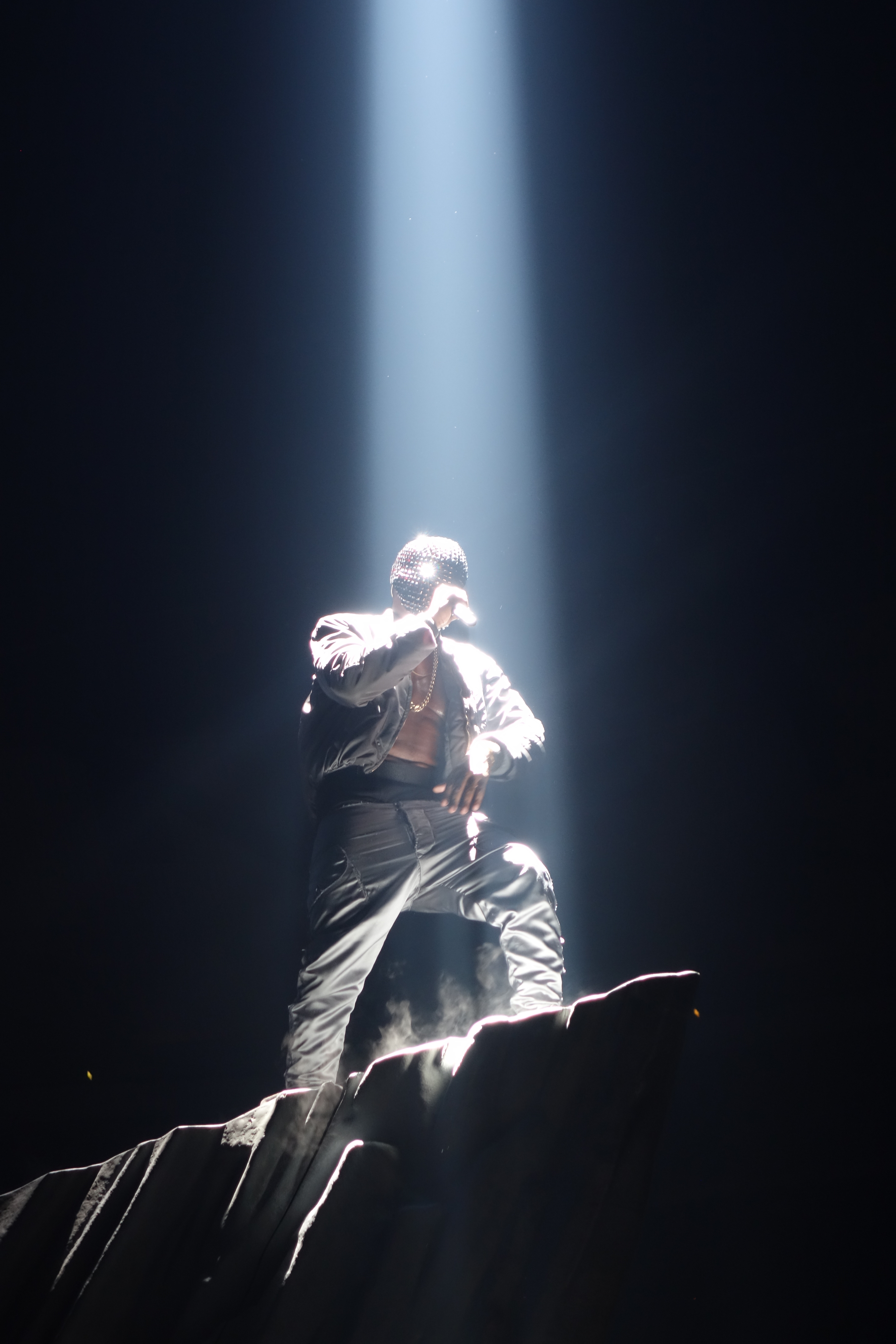
West performed the song on the second of his two nights at Chicago's United Center for The Yeezus Tour in December 2013, with the crowd re-citing its lyrics.

West performed the song during his show for VH1 in February 2009, although the performance was not originally broadcast. It was later included as the tenth performance on the DVD of his second live album VH1 Storytellers on January 5, 2010, being added as a bonus clip. West performed "Homecoming" to an audience of 3,000 students from six different Chicago public schools for his second annual free Stay In School benefit concert at the Chicago Theatre on June 11, 2009, generating excitement amongst the audience. The concert was organized through West's charity foundation to help raise awareness of it, and he later partnered with Fuse for the show's television broadcast on July 25. On August 12, 2010, West and Legend performed the song to open their secret black-tie show at The Box nightclub on Chrystie Street in Manhattan, NYC, held for around 200 select attendees over 90 minutes. West dubbed the function "Rosewood" and used a stage set-up including a Roland TR-808 drum machine, a keyboard, and two microphones, with one utilized solely for Auto-Tune. Legend sat at the set-up's baby grand piano for the performance, which was accompanied by a red backdrop. On December 31, 2010, West made a surprise appearance during Jay-Z and Coldplay's co-headlining set at the Marquee Nightclub for the grand opening of the luxury resort casino and hotel Cosmpolitan on the Las Vegas Strip of Paradise, Nevada, performing the song with Martin for the first time. West performed the song live for his headlining set at the 2011 Coachella Festival. On December 18, 2013, West performed the song towards the close of his second show at Chicago's United Center on The Yeezus Tour (2013–14). The performance was the first one of "Homecoming" on the tour and saw the crowd chanting the lyrics back to West.

== Appearances in media ==
A remix of "Homecoming" by DiscoTech was included as the 17th track of Sky High on November 17, 2008. The mixtape consisted of remixes of various tracks that West originally produced and was compiled by DJ Benzi with the rapper's associate Plain Pat. The project was commissioned by West and his team in the lead-up to his fourth studio album 808s & Heartbreak, with each remix experiencing at least five reiterations before release; they are mostly club-friendly dance-themed numbers. Leo Flynn produced a Rockabye Baby! CD that consisted of instrumental lullaby renditions of West's tracks and was released on May 18, 2010, including "Homecoming" as the 12th and final track. On June 7, 2012, producer Carlos Serrano shared his mashup of "Homecoming" and singer-songwriter Lana Del Rey's "Born to Die" (2011), layering West and Martin's vocals over the instrumentation of the latter song. Production duo Urban Noize included a re-imagined version of the song on their remix EP Mr. West on July 20, which consisted of remixes of eight tracks across West's career chosen by the duo.

On October 3, 2016, Jeff Kirshman published his ode to "Homecoming" in Brooklyn Magazine, writing that it reminds him of living in Wyoming due to invoking his memories of images and knowledge. Kirshman particularly enjoyed the song when listening to Graduation in high school and first performed it at a dilapidated Hollywood-themed Karen & Jim's venue, affirming his view of his rap skills as basic from the crowd's negative reactions. He was compelled to perform the song again and did this at a bar while drinking warm beer by a row of dim lights, onlooked by a mounted head of the Star Wars character Admiral Ackbar. On April 29, 2022, British rapper Dave played a section of the song on piano for his We're All Alone in This Together tour's show at the Riviera Theatre in Chicago, serving as a tribute to West.

== Track listing ==
- German digital download
1. "Homecoming" (featuring Chris Martin)
2. "Stronger" (Ad Remix – Main)
- German Maxi-single
1. "Homecoming" (featuring Chris Martin)
2. "Good Night" (featuring Mos Def and Al Be Back)
- Japanese 12" vinyl
1. "Homecoming" (featuring Chris Martin)
2. "Stronger" (Ad Remix – Main)

== Credits and personnel ==
Information taken from Graduation liner notes.

Recording

- Recorded at Fever Recording Studios (North Hollywood, CA), Abbey Road Studios (London), Sony Music Studios (NYC), and Record Plant and Ocean Way Recording (Hollywood)
- Mixed at Chalice Studios (Hollywood) and Chung King Studios (NYC)

Personnel

- Kanye West – songwriter, producer
- Warryn Campbell – songwriter, producer
- Chris Martin – songwriter, additional vocals
- Andrew Dawson – recorder, mix engineer
- Bruce Buechner – recorder
- Anthony Kilhoffer – recorder
- Greg Koller – recorder
- Mike Dean – mix engineer
- Matty Green – assistant mix engineer
- Anthony Palazzole – assistant mix engineer
- Andy Marcinkowski – assistant mix engineer
- Jon Brion – percussionist
- Sean Cooper – sound design
- DJ "Reflex" – project coordinator
- Sandra Campbell – project coordinator

== Charts ==
=== Weekly charts ===
Chart performance for "Homecoming"
Chart (2008)	Peak position
Australia (ARIA)	32
Austria (Ö3 Austria Top 40)	27
Belgium (Ultratop 50 Flanders)	17
Belgium (Ultratop 50 Wallonia)	35
Canada Hot 100 (Billboard)	79
Denmark (Tracklisten)	15
Finland (Suomen virallinen lista)	13
Germany (GfK)	17
Ireland (IRMA)	5
Netherlands (Dutch Top 40)	26
Netherlands (Single Top 100)	39
New Zealand (Recorded Music NZ)	22
Norway (VG-lista)	11
Romania (Romanian Top 100)	77
Russia (Tophit)	219
Sweden (Sverigetopplistan)	19
Switzerland (Schweizer Hitparade)	38
Turkey (Billboard Türkiye)	16
UK Singles (Official Charts)	9
US Billboard Hot 100	69
US Hot R&B/Hip-Hop Songs (Billboard)	53
US Hot Rap Songs (Billboard)	15
US Pop 100 (Billboard)	50
US Rhythmic Airplay (Billboard)	27

2026 chart performance for "Homecoming"
Chart (2026)	Peak position
US Hot R&B/Hip-Hop Songs (Billboard)	16

=== Year-end charts ===
2008 year-end chart performance for "Homecoming"
Chart (2008)	Peak position
Australia Urban (ARIA)	35
Belgium (Ultratop Flanders)	85
UK Singles (OCC)	91

== Certifications ==
Certifications for "Homecoming"
Region	Certification	Certified units/sales
Australia (ARIA)	Gold	35,000^{‡}
Denmark (IFPI Danmark)	Platinum	90,000^{‡}
Germany (BVMI)	Gold	150,000^{‡}
New Zealand (RMNZ)	4× Platinum	120,000^{‡}
United Kingdom (BPI)	2× Platinum	1,200,000^{‡}
United States (RIAA)	3× Platinum	3,000,000^{‡}
^{‡} Sales+streaming figures based on certification alone.

== Release history ==
Release dates and formats for "Homecoming"
Region	Date	Format	Label(s)	Ref.
United Kingdom	February 2, 2008	Digital download	Roc A Fella; Def Jam	
United Kingdom	February 18, 2008	12" vinyl	Roc A Fella; Def Jam	
Germany	May 9, 2008	Maxi-single	Roc A Fella; Def Jam	
United States	May 13, 2008	Contemporary hit radio; Rhythmic contemporary radio	Roc A Fella; Def Jam	
Japan	May 19, 2008	12" vinyl	Mercury	
Various	July 1, 2008	CD single	Universal	

== See also ==
- List of UK top-ten singles in 2008

== Bibliography ==
- Beaumont, Mark (2015). Kanye West: God & Monster. London, England: Omnibus Press. ISBN 978-1-783-23394-6.
