= Room Inside the World =

Studio album by Ought
- Released: February 16, 2018
- Genres: Post-punk; art punk; punk rock
- Length: 40:05
- Label: Merge
- Producer: Nicolas Vernhes

Ought chronology
Sun Coming Down (2015)	Room Inside the World (2018)

Singles from Room Inside the World
- 1. "These 3 Things" Released: November 1, 2017; 2. "Disgraced In America" Released: January 16, 2018; 3. "Desire" Released: February 6, 2018

Room Inside the World is the third and final studio album by Canadian art punk band, Ought. The album was released on February 16, 2018, through Merge Records.

== Critical reception ==
Professional ratings
Aggregate scores
Source	Rating
AnyDecentMusic?	7.9/10
Metacritic	81/100
Review scores
Source	Rating
AllMusic	4/5 stars
The A.V. Club	B+
DIY	4/5 stars
Exclaim!	7/10
Mojo	4/5 stars
Pitchfork	7.1/10
PopMatters	8/10
Q	4/5 stars
The Skinny	5/5 stars
Uncut	7/10

Room Inside the World received critical acclaim upon its release. At Metacritic, which assigns a normalized rating out of 100 to reviews from mainstream publications, the album received an average score of 81, based on 19 reviews, indicating "universal acclaim".

== Track listing ==
All lyrics are written by Timothy Darcy, Timothy Keen, Matthew May, and Ben Stidworthy; all music is composed by Ought.

No.	Title	Length
1.	"Into the Sea"	3:40
2.	"Disgraced In America"	4:22
3.	"Disaffectation"	4:35
4.	"These 3 Things"	3:46
5.	"Desire"	5:19
6.	"Brief Shield"	4:33
7.	"Take Everything"	5:10
8.	"Pieces Wasted"	4:39
9.	"Alice"	4:00
Total length:		40:05

== Personnel ==
The following individuals were credited on the album:

- Greg Calbi – mastering
- Choir! Choir! Choir! – vocals
- Eamon Cuinn – clarinet
- Tim Darcy – composition, guitar, vocals
- Erin Lawlor – artwork
- Steve Fallone – mastering
- James Goddard – saxophone
- Tim Keen – composition, drums, synthesizer, vibraphone, viola
- Matt May – composition
- Matt May – guitar, keyboards, synthesizer
- Daniel Murphy – design
- Ben Stidworthy – bass, composition
- Nicolas Vernhes – guitar, keyboards, mixing, noise, production
- Gabe Wax – engineering

== Charts ==
Chart (2018)	Peak position
US Independent Albums (Billboard)	31

== Accolades ==
Publication	Country	Accolade	Year	Rank
Paste	US	The 50 Best Albums of 2018	2018	27
