= Deep in View =

2022 debut album by Cola

Studio album by Cola
- Released: May 20, 2022
- Genre: Alternative rock; post-punk
- Length: 34:24
- Label: Fire Talk Records

Cola chronology
| Deep in View (2022) | The Gloss (2024) |

Deep in View is the debut studio album by Canadian post-punk band Cola. It was released on May 20, 2022, via Fire Talk Records.

The album was written by former Ought members Tim Darcy and Ben Stidworthy, who collaborated with Toronto-based drummer Evan Cartwright. Deep in View received positive acclaim upon its release, with a Metacritic score of 81/100, indicating "universal acclaim". Critics praised the album's melody, energy, and the band's subtle experimentation, describing it as a new path rather than a continuation of Ought's work.

== Background ==
In 2019, Darcy and Stidworthy started collaborating with Toronto-based drummer Evan Cartwright, whom they met frequently on tour. In 2020, during the COVID-19 pandemic, the band wrote a collection of songs that would eventually become Deep in View. In November 2021, on the same day Ought announced its disbandment, Darcy, Stidworthy, and Cartwright revealed their new band, Cola, and released a new single, "Blank Curtain". In February 2022, Fire Talk Records formally announced Deep in View, providing the full tracklist and releasing a second single, "So Excited". The label said the album takes its name from a 1965 anthology of interviews with British philosopher Alan Watts.

Deep in View was officially released on May 20, 2022.

== Critical reception ==
Professional ratings
Aggregate scores
| Source | Rating |
|---|---|
| Metacritic | 81/100 |
Review scores
| Source | Rating |
| AllMusic | 4/5 stars |
| Exclaim! | 8/10 |
| Loud and Quiet | 8/10 |
| Pitchfork | 7.3/10 |
| Uncut | 8/10 |

Deep in View received positive acclaim upon its release. On Metacritic, which assigns a normalized score out of 100 to ratings from publications, the album received a mean score of 81 based on 4 reviews, indicating "universal acclaim".

Chris Gee, writing for Exclaim!, praised the album's "willingness to lean into [the band's] instinct for melody." He added that, compared to Ought's "sprawling abandon and explosive spontaneity, Cola keep it more succinct and lock in their adrenaline right from the get-go."

Daniel Dylan Wray, of Uncut Magazine, also praised the album, calling the album's single, "Blank Curtain", an "infectious opener, as punchy as it is loosely unfurling, with rolling bass, gentle licks of melody and layered guitar coalescing into a radiating hum."

AllMusic's Fred Thomas wrote the album is "a sturdy, engaging, and highly listenable debut that feels less like a continuation of Ought and more like a new path branching off some of their best work."

Pitchfork's Jesse Locke scored the album a 7.3 out of 10, writing the band "haven't reinvented the wheel, but these subtle experiments suggest they still have boundaries to push."

== Track listing ==
All tracks are written by Timothy Darcy and Ben Stidworthy.

| No. | Title | Length |
|---|---|---|
| 1. | "Blank Curtain" | 04:31 |
| 2. | "So Excited" | 03:00 |
| 3. | "At Pace" | 03:07 |
| 4. | "Met Resistance" | 03:12 |
| 5. | "Degree" | 02:51 |
| 6. | "Water Table" | 04:03 |
| 7. | "Gossamer" | 03:18 |
| 8. | "Mint" | 03:23 |
| 9. | "Fulton Park" | 02:41 |
| 10. | "Landers" | 04:18 |
| Total length: | | 34:24 |

== Personnel ==
=== Musicians ===
- Tim Darcy – lead vocals, guitar
- Ben Stidworthy – bass, guitar, keyboard
- Evan Cartwright – drums, supercollider, guitar

=== Technical ===
- Valentin Ignat – recording
- Gabe Wax – mixing
- Harris Newman – mastering
- Katrijn Oelbrandt – artwork and layout
