= I'm Good (mixtape) =

Mixtape by Kanye West
- Released: August 1, 2003
- Recorded: 2003
- Genre: Hip-hop
- Length: 1:19:58
- Label: Roc-A-Fella Records
- Producer: Kanye West

Kanye West chronology
Get Well Soon (2002)	I'm Good (2003)	Kon the Louis Vuitton Don (2004)

I'm Good (stylized as I'm Good...) is the second mixtape by American rapper Kanye West, released on August 1, 2003. It was most likely named after West's car accident that inspired the creation of his first single called "Through the Wire".

== Background ==
The mixtape was released on CD by West's then-record label Roc-A-Fella Records on August 1, 2003. The mixtape is composed of snippets of tracks as well as finished songs that would later end up on Kanye's debut studio album The College Dropout, such as "Jesus Walks" and "Two Words". Multiple original Kanye West songs that are on the mixtape have not been released on streaming services, and tracks from other rappers that Kanye produced but did not perform are on the mixtape.

== Track listing ==
No.	Title	Producers	Length
1.	"Intro" (featuring John Legend)	Kanye West	0:51
2.	"Heavy Hitters" (featuring GLC)	Kanye West	3:01
3.	"Excuse Me Miss Again (Remix)" (by Jay-Z featuring Kanye West)	Kanye West	3:24
4.	"Jesus Walks" (snippet)	Kanye West	0:49
5.	"Two Words" (featuring Freeway, Yasiin Bey and The Boys Choir of Harlem)	Kanye West	4:25
6.	"Used to Love U" (by John Legend)	John Legend, Kanye West	2:35
7.	"Get By (Remix)" (by Talib Kweli featuring Yasiin Bey, Kanye West, Busta Rhymes, Jay-Z)	Kanye West	5:43
8.	"In Cold Blood (Remix)" (by Scarface featuring Lloyd Banks, 50 Cent)	Kanye West	2:38
9.	"Philly Niggas"" (by Beanie Sigel featuring Freeway)	Brian Miller, Kanye West	3:03
10.	"You're Not Ready" (by 50 Cent featuring Tony Yayo and Lloyd Banks) (snippet)	Kanye West	1:11
11.	"Drop Dead Gorgeous"	Kanye West	2:14
12.	"When I Die" (by Shyne featuring Foxy Brown)	Brian Miller, Kanye West	2:58
13.	"Digital Thugz" (featuring Mikkey Halsted and k-os)	Kanye West	2:23
14.	"Poppin' Tags (Remix)" (by Jay-Z featuring Twista, Ludacris, Kanye West)	Kanye West	3:07
15.	"Badonkadonk" (by Twista featuring Jazze Pha)	Jazze Pha	2:45
16.	"Half Price"	Kanye West	2:38
17.	"Heartbreaker" (by Lil' Kim)	Kanye West, Deric D-Dot Angelettie	1:15
18.	"03 Electric Relaxation" (featuring Consequence)	A Tribe Called Quest	3:33
19.	"Out the Game" (by Consequence featuring John Legend, Kanye West)	Kanye West	3:07
20.	"GLC the Knockout King"	Keezo Kane	3:07
21.	"Muzik" (by Knoc-Turn'al featuring Samuel Christian)	Kanye West	0:56
22.	"Freewest" (by Freeway featuring Kanye West)	Kanye West	1:33
23.	"Hear the Song" (by Freeway)	Kanye West	1:35
24.	"Blueprint Compilation"	Kanye West	3:20
25.	"Girls, Girls, Girls (Remix)" (by Jay-Z featuring Kanye West)	Kanye West	3:12
26.	"Bonnie & Clyde Freestyle"	Kanye West	2:32
27.	"Stir Crazy" (by The Madd Rapper featuring Eminem)	Kanye West	3:09
28.	"Deja Vu (Remix)" (by Made Men featuring Mase, Cardan and Big Pun)	Deric D-Dot Angelettie and Kanye West	1:43
29.	"Olskoolicegre" (by Olskool Ice-Gre featuring Kanye West)	Devo Springsteen	2:08
30.	"Get By (Remix)" (by Snoop Dogg feat. Mr. Cheeks)	Kanye West	1:05
31.	"Through the Wire"	Kanye West	3:32
Total length:			1:19:58
