= Kon the Louis Vuitton Don =

Mixtape by Kanye West
- Released: January 24, 2004
- Recorded: 2004
- Genre: Hip-hop
- Length: 1:13:44
- Label: Roc-A-Fella
- Producers: Kanye West; Alicia Keys; A-Plus; Arrowstar; Baby Paul; Bang; the Neptunes

Kanye West chronology
I'm Good (2003)	Kon the Louis Vuitton Don (2004)	The College Dropout (2004)

Kon the Louis Vuitton Don is the third mixtape by American rapper Kanye West, and the last project before the release of his debut studio album The College Dropout. The mixtape is named after "the Louis Vuitton Don", a moniker West used to refer to himself as, and was released on January 24, 2004.

== Background ==
The mixtape had a relatively big release at the time in comparison with West's other mixtapes having both a CD and a vinyl. It was released on January 24, 2004 as an independent release by West. The mixtape is composed of tracks that West produced but did not perform, as well as multiple original Kanye West songs. Many have not yet been released on streaming services.

Various online communities speculated that the mixtape was fanmade, because unlike other early West mixtapes, the project did not have the Roc-A-Fella logo on it. This was later proven false after West confirmed the mixtape's existence in an interview with Complex.

== Reception ==
Professional ratings
Review scores
Source	Rating
Prefix	70/100

The mixtape did not gather much critical recognition, but received a 70/100 rating from the publication Prefix Magazine.

== Track listing ==
No.	Title	Producer	Length
1.	"Intro (Kon The Louis Vuitton Don) (performed by Jay-Z)"	Kanye West	1:00
2.	"Better Than Yours (performed by Kanye West featuring Common)"	The Neptunes	2:59
3.	"Chase the Devil (performed by Lee “Scratch” Perry)"	Kanye West	1:55
4.	"Chase You Outta Here (performed by 50 Cent)"	Kanye West	1:46
5.	"Lucifer (performed by Jay-Z)"	Kanye West	3:05
6.	"Encore (performed by Jay-Z)"	Kanye West	4:05
7.	"You Don’t Know My Name (performed by Alicia Keys)"	Kanye West, Alicia Keys	4:23
8.	"Slow Jamz (performed by Twista featuring Kanye West, Jamie Foxx)"	Kanye West	3:52
9.	"Knock Knock Remix (performed by Kanye West featuring Monica)"	Kanye West	3:52
10.	"Wouldn’t You Like to Ride (performed by Malik Yusef featuring Kanye West, Common, JoVaughn Clark)"	Kanye West	3:29
11.	"Me Against The Music (performed by Britney Spears featuring Madonna, Kanye West)"	Kanye West	3:41
12.	"No More For Me (performed by Kanye West featuring Mark Spitz)"	Kanye West	3:59
13.	"Throw Ya Hands (performed by Kanye West)" (Not in the CD or the vinyl but it is credited on the back of the CD's case)	Kanye West	3:57
14.	"Keep the Receipt (performed by Ol’ Dirty Bastard featuring Kanye West)"	Kanye West	3:29
15.	"Jay-Z freestyle (performed by Jay-Z)"	Kanye West	1:27
16.	"Stand Up (Remix) (performed by Ludacris featuring Kanye West, Shawnna)"	Kanye West	4:21
17.	"Dogs Out (performed by DMX)"	Kanye West	3:18
18.	"Doin' My Job (performed by T.I.)"	Kanye West	2:24
19.	"Turn Ya Self In (by Consequence featuring Kanye West)"	Baby Paul	3:16
20.	"’03 Til Infinity (by Consequence featuring Kanye West)"	A-Plus	4:18
21.	"Defense (performed by GLC featuring Meka)"	Kanye West, Arrowstar	3:28
22.	"Through the Wire (Remix) (performed by Kanye West)"	Kanye West	4:01
23.	"You (performed by Kanye West featuring Mela)"	Kanye West	3:53
24.	"Certified Gangstas (performed by Jim Jones featuring Bezel, Cam’ron)"	Bang	3:00
Total length:			74:44
