= Pitchfork Music Festival 2015 =

Music festival

- Dates: July 17–19, 2015
- Locations: Union Park, Chicago, United States
- Website: pitchforkmusicfestival.com

The Pitchfork Music Festival 2015 was held on July 17 to 19, 2015 at the Union Park, Chicago, United States. The festival was headlined by Wilco, Sleater-Kinney and Chance the Rapper.

== Lineup ==
Headline performers are listed in boldface. Artists listed from latest to earliest set times.

Green
Friday, July 17	Saturday, July 18	Sunday, July 19
**Wilco**; Panda Bear iLoveMakonnen	**Sleater-Kinney**; The New Pornographers; Kurt Vile and the Violators; Future Brown; Jimmy Whispers	**Chance the Rapper**; Caribou; Courtney Barnett; Waxahatchee; Bitchin Bajas

Red
Friday, July 17	Saturday, July 18	Sunday, July 19
Chvrches; Mac DeMarco; Natalie Prass	Future Islands; Parquet Courts; Ex Hex; Protomartyr	Run the Jewels; Jamie xx Madlib & Freddie Gibbs; Viet Cong

Blue
Friday, July 17	Saturday, July 18	Sunday, July 19
Ought; Iceage; Tobias Jesso Jr. Steve Gunn; Jessica Pratt; Ryley Walker	Vic Mensa; Towkio (Note: Sophie was set to perform but cancelled due to heavy rain. Then, she was replaced by Towkio.); Shamir; ASAP Ferg; Ariel Pink; ~~Vince Staples~~ (Note: Vince Staples was set to perform but cancelled due to flight delay.); Mr Twin Sister; Bully	Todd Terje & The Olsens; A. G. Cook; Clark; How to Dress Well; Perfume Genius; The Julie Ruin; Mourn; Single Mothers
