= Ought (band) =

Post-punk band from Montreal, Quebec

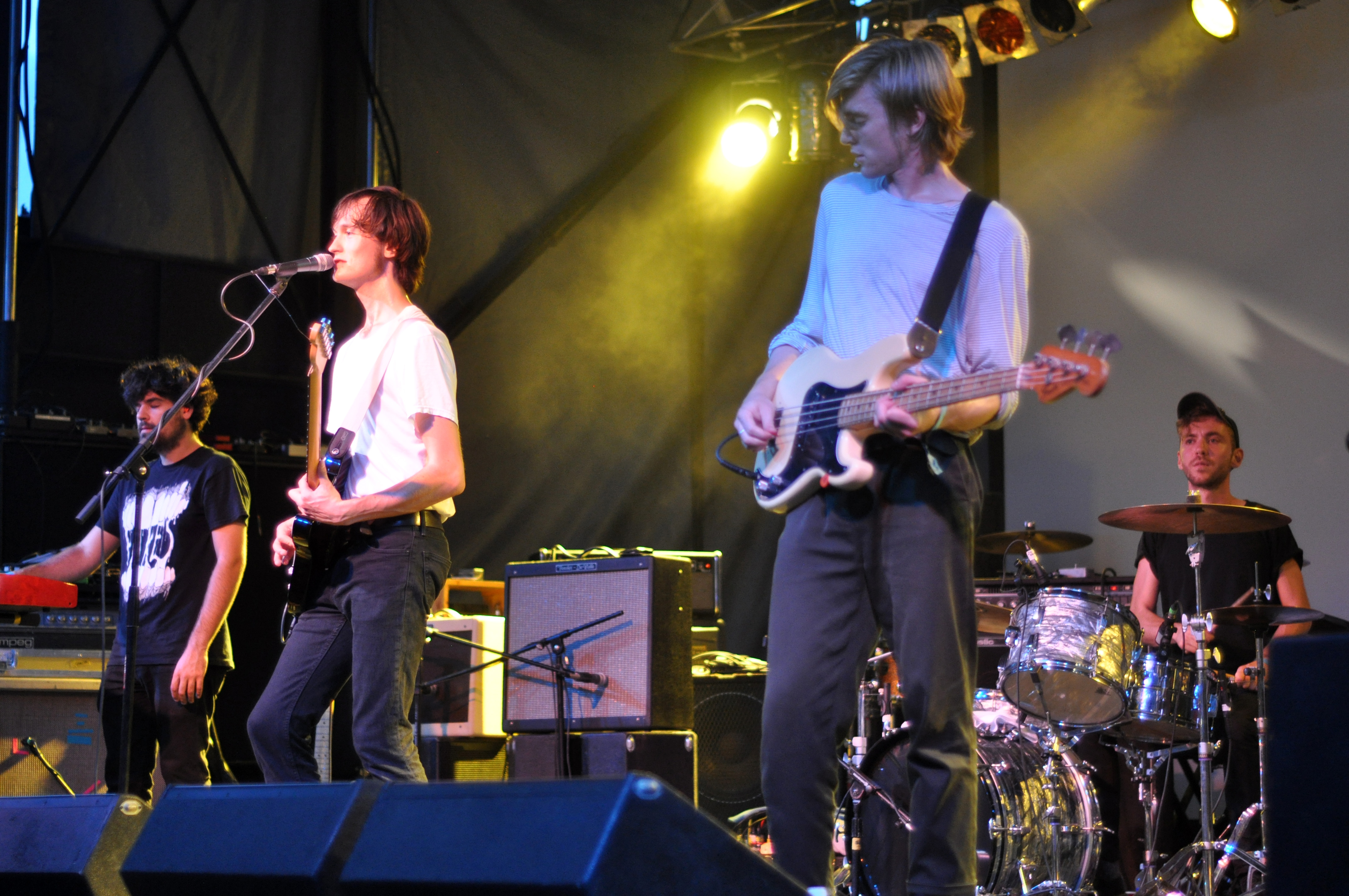
- Ought, 2015

Background information
- Origin: Montreal, Quebec, Canada
- Genres: Art punk; post-punk; indie rock; noise rock
- Years active: 2011–2021
- Labels: Constellation Records, Merge Records
- Spinoffs: Cola
- Past members: Tim Darcy; Matt May; Ben Stidworthy; Tim Keen

Ought was a post-punk band from Montreal, Quebec, Canada, formed in 2011. The band consisted of Tim Darcy (vocals, guitar), Ben Stidworthy (bass guitar), Matt May (keyboards), and Tim Keen (drums).

The band released three full-length studio albums across its ten-year career: More than Any Other Day (2014), Sun Coming Down (2015) and Room Inside the World (2018). The band quietly disbanded in 2021, with Darcy and Stidworthy going on to announce a new project Cola that same year.

== History ==
Ought was formed in 2011 when its members began living together in a communal band practice space and recorded their earliest material. The band's first EP, New Calm, was released in 2012. After signing with Constellation Records, a full-length album, More than Any Other Day, was released in 2014. The album achieved critical acclaim, including a Best New Music accolade from Pitchfork Media. It was noted in numerous year-end lists for 2014 including Rolling Stone, Pitchfork, Drowned In Sound, Loud and Quiet, Exclaim!, The Crack, and Paste. The album reached #20 on the Billboard Heatseekers chart in the United States.

In October 2014, the band released Once More with Feeling, an EP of B-sides from More Than Any Other Day and re-recordings of earlier songs. Sun Coming Down, the band's second full-length album, was released in September 2015.

The band worked with the French producer Nicolas Vernhes on its third studio album, Room Inside the World, which was released on 16 February 2018.

=== Break-up and formation of Cola ===
Ought announced its disbandment in November 2021. A new band with Darcy and Stidworthy as members, Cola, was announced on the same day, along with the release of its first single "Blank Curtain". Cola has gone on to release three studio albums: Deep in View (2022), The Gloss (2024) and Cost of Living Adjustment (2026).

Regarding the possibility of an Ought reunion, vocalist and guitarist Tim Darcy stated in May 2026: "I definitely think of the bands as two very distinct projects despite overlap in personnel. I'm always as stoked to meet Ought fans as I am people who only know Cola. We love playing [Cola] songs so obviously we lead with that, but we have played "Beautiful Blue Sky" a few times (with Matt from Ought as in the case of London) which was very special. All I can say is that if it feels right... we might do it again? It's not a hard rule."

== Side projects ==
Darcy released his first solo album, Saturday Night, in 2017.

== Members ==
- Tim Darcy – guitars, vocals
- Matt May – keyboards
- Ben Stidworthy – bass guitar
- Tim Keen – drums, violin

== Discography ==
Studio albums

- More than Any Other Day (Constellation Records, 2014)
- Sun Coming Down (Constellation Records, 2015)
- Room Inside the World (Merge Records / Royal Mountain Records, 2018)

EPs

- New Calm (self-released, 2012)
- Once More With Feeling EP (Constellation Records, 2014)
- Four Desires (Merge Records, 2018)
