= Get Well Soon (mixtape) =

Mixtape by Kanye West
- Released: December 14, 2002
- Recorded: 2002
- Genre: Hip-hop
- Length: 78:52
- Label: Roc-A-Fella Records
- Producer: Kanye West

Kanye West chronology
| The Prerequisite (2001) | Get Well Soon (2002) | I'm Good (2003) |

Get Well Soon (stylized as Get Well Soon...) is the debut mixtape by American rapper Kanye West, released on December 14, 2002. It is believed that the mixtape is named after West's car accident that inspired the creation of his debut single, "Through the Wire".

== Background ==
The mixtape was released on CD by West's then-record label Roc-A-Fella Records on December 14, 2002. The mixtape is composed of snippets of tracks as well as finished songs that would later end up on Kanye's debut studio album The College Dropout (2004), such as "Jesus Walks" and "Two Words". Multiple original songs featured on the mixtape have not been released on streaming services, and tracks from other rappers that West produced for but did not perform on are included.

== Track listing ==
| No. | Title | Length |
|---|---|---|
| 1. | "Intro" (performed by Free of 106 and Park) | 0:28 |
| 2. | "Live from Irving Plaza, New York" (featuring Talib Kweli and Mos Def) | 3:48 |
| 3. | "Guess Who's Back?" (freestyle) (performed by 50 Cent) | 1:38 |
| 4. | "Jesus Walks" (snippet) | 0:35 |
| 5. | "Through the Wire" (featuring Chaka Khan and Elton John) | 4:01 |
| 6. | "Two Words" | 4:26 |
| 7. | "Show Go On" (performed by Freeway featuring Twista) | 2:23 |
| 8. | "Champions" (performed by Damon Dash featuring Kanye West, Young Chris, Beanie Sigel, Cam'ron and Twista) | 6:09 |
| 9. | "Live From Tweeter Center, LA" (featuring Jay‐Z) | 0:32 |
| 10. | "The Bounce" (performed by Jay‐Z featuring Kanye West) | 4:18 |
| 11. | "Poppin' Tags" (performed by Jay‐Z featuring Twista and OutKast) | 2:26 |
| 12. | "A Million" (freestyle) | 1:19 |
| 13. | "'03 Bonnie & Clyde" (performed by Jay‐Z featuring Beyoncé) | 1:15 |
| 14. | "B R Right" (performed by Trina featuring Ludacris) | 4:09 |
| 15. | "Brown Sugar" (performed by Mos Def) | 3:55 |
| 16. | "Good To You" (performed by Talib Kweli) | 4:32 |
| 17. | "The Good, The Bad, The Ugly" (with Consequence) | 2:16 |
| 18. | "Dead Or Alive" (performed by Cam'ron) | 4:07 |
| 19. | "Takeover" (performed by Cam'ron) | 2:02 |
| 20. | "Got Nowhere" (performed by State Property) | 1:11 |
| 21. | "Poppa Was a Player" (performed by Nas) | 2:34 |
| 22. | "Home" | 4:02 |
| 23. | "Reebok Commercial" (performed by Scarface) | 0:58 |
| 24. | "Heaven" (performed by Scarface featuring Kelly Price)) | 3:14 |
| 25. | "In Cold Blood" (performed by Scarface) | 3:19 |
| 26. | "My Way" | 3:03 |
| 27. | "You Made Me" (performed by Harlem World Crew featuring Carl Thomas and Nas) | 2:43 |
| 28. | "My Life" (performed by Foxy Brown) | 2:01 |
| 29. | "Ghetto" (performed by The Madd Rapper featuring Raekwon and Carl Thomas) | 5:44 |
| 30. | "The Truth" (performed by Beanie Sigel) | 4:09 |
| 31. | "This Can't Be Life" (performed by Jay-Z) | 4:48 |
| 32. | "Nothing Like It" (performed by Beanie Sigel featuring The Harlem Boys Choir) | 3:19 |
| 33. | "Izzo (H.O.V.A.)" (unplugged version) (performed by Jay-Z) | 1:19 |
| 34. | "Heart Of The City (Ain't No Love)" (unplugged version) (performed by Jay-Z) | 3:47 |
| 35. | "Never Change" (performed by Jay-Z featuring Kanye West) | 1:12 |
| 36. | "My Life, My Love" (performed by GLC) | 3:45 |
| Total length: | | 1:28:52 |
